= List of high schools in New York (state) =

This is a list of high schools in the state of New York. It contains only schools currently open. For former schools, see List of closed secondary schools in New York and Category:Defunct schools in New York (state).

Unless otherwise indicated, all schools are public (government funded) and do not serve any grades lower than fifth grade.

== Albany County ==
=== Public ===
- Albany High School, Albany
- Berne-Knox-Westerlo Secondary School, Berne
- Bethlehem Central High School, Delmar
- Clayton A. Bouton High School, Voorheesville
- Cohoes High School, Cohoes
- Colonie Central High School, Colonie
- Green Tech Charter High School, Albany
- Guilderland High School, Guilderland Center
- Heatly Junior-Senior High School, Green Island
- Ravena-Coeymans-Selkirk High School, Ravena
- Shaker High School, Latham
- Watervliet Junior-Senior High School, Watervliet

=== Private ===
- Academy of the Holy Names, Albany
- The Albany Academy, Albany
- Albany Academy for Girls, Albany
- Bishop Maginn High School, Albany
- Christian Brothers Academy, Colonie
- La Salle School, Albany
- Latham Christian Academy (PK-12), Latham
- Loudonville Christian School (PK-12), Loudonville
- Mount Moriah Christian Academy (PK-12), Glenmont
- Saint Anne Institute (PK-12), Albany

== Allegany County ==
=== Public ===
- Alfred-Almond Junior-Senior High School, Almond
- Andover Central School, Andover
- Belfast Central School, Belfast
- Bolivar-Richburg Middle/High School, Bolivar
- Canaseraga School, Canaseraga
- Cuba-Rushford High School, Cuba
- Fillmore Central School, Fillmore
- Friendship Central School, Friendship
- Genesee Valley Central School, Belmont
- Scio Central School, Scio
- Wellsville High School, Wellsville
- Whitesville Central School, Whitesville

=== Private ===
- Houghton Academy, Houghton

== Broome County ==
=== Public ===
- Binghamton High School, Binghamton
- Chenango Forks High School, Binghamton
- Chenango Valley High School, Binghamton
- Harpursville Junior-Senior High School, Harpursville
- Johnson City High School, Johnson City
- Maine-Endwell High School, Endwell
- Susquehanna Valley High School, Conklin
- Union-Endicott High School, Endicott
- Vestal High School, Vestal
- Whitney Point High School, Whitney Point
- Windsor High School, Windsor

=== Private ===
- Central Baptist Christian Academy, Binghamton
- Ross Corners Christian Academy, Vestal
- Seton Catholic Central High School, Binghamton

== Cattaraugus County ==
=== Public ===
- Allegany-Limestone High School, Allegany
- Ten Broeck Academy, Franklinville
- Cattaraugus-Little Valley High School, Cattaraugus
- Ellicottville Middle School High School, Ellicottville
- Gowanda High School, Gowanda
- Hinsdale Middle/High School, Hinsdale
- Olean High School, Olean
- Pioneer High School, Yorkshire
- Portville Central School High School, Portville
- Randolph Academy, Randolph
- Randolph Junior/Senior High School, Randolph
- Salamanca Junior/Senior High School, Salamanca
- West Valley Central School, West Valley

=== Private ===
- Archbishop Walsh High School, Olean
- Central Baptist Christian School, Yorkshire
- New Life Christian School, Olean

== Cayuga County ==
=== Public ===
- Auburn High School, Auburn
- Cato-Meridian High School, Cato
- Moravia High School, Moravia
- Southern Cayuga High School, Poplar Ridge
- Union Springs High School, Union Springs
- Weedsport Junior/Senior High School, Weedsport
- Dana L. West Junior/Senior High School, Port Byron

=== Private ===
- Tyburn Academy of Mary Immaculate, Auburn
- Union Springs Academy, Union Springs

== Chautauqua County ==
- Bethel Baptist Christian Academy (private K-12), Jamestown
- Brocton Middle School/ High School, Brocton
- Cassadaga Valley Middle High School, Sinclairville
- Chautauqua Lake Secondary School, Mayville
- Clymer Central School, Clymer
- Dunkirk High School, Dunkirk
- Falconer Middle/High School, Falconer
- Forestville Middle/High School, Forestville
- Fredonia High School, Fredonia
- Frewsburg Middle School/High School, Frewsburg
- Gustavus Adolphus Learning Center, Jamestown
- Jamestown High School, Jamestown
- Maple Grove Junior-Senior High School, Bemus Point
- Panama Central School, Panama
- Pine Valley Central Junior/Senior High School, South Dayton
- Ripley Central School, Ripley
- Sherman Central School, Sherman
- Silver Creek High School, Silver Creek
- Southwestern Central High School, Jamestown
- Westfield Academy and Central School, Westfield

== Chemung County ==
- Thomas A. Edison High School, Elmira Heights
- Elmira High School, Elmira
- Horseheads High School, Horseheads
- Notre Dame High School (private), Elmira
- Southside High School, Elmira
- Twin Tiers Christian Academy (private), Breesport

== Chenango County ==
- Afton Middle School High School, Afton
- Bainbridge-Guilford High School, Bainbridge
- Greene High School, Greene
- Norwich High School, Norwich
- Otselic Valley Central School, South Otselic
- Oxford Academy High School, Oxford
- Sherburne-Earlville Central School, Sherburne
- Unadilla Valley High School, New Berlin
- Valley Heights Christian Academy (private PK-12), Norwich

== Clinton County ==
- AuSable Valley High School, Clintonville
- Beekmantown High School, West Chazy
- Chazy Central Rural Junior/Senior High School, Chazy
- Northeastern Clinton High School, Champlain
- Northern Adirondack Middle/High School, Ellenburg Depot
- Peru High School, Peru
- Plattsburgh High School, Plattsburgh
- Saranac High School, Saranac
- Seton Catholic Central High School, Plattsburgh

== Columbia County ==
- Berkshire Junior/Senior High School, Canaan
- Brookwood Secure Center (OCFS), Claverack
- Chatham High School, Chatham
- Columbia Christian Academy (private K-12), Ghent
- Ichabod Crane High School, Valatie
- Darrow School (private), New Lebanon
- Germantown Central School, Germantown
- Hawthorne Valley Waldorf School (private PK-12), Ghent
- Hudson High School, Hudson
- New Lebanon Junior/Senior High School, New Lebanon
- Taconic Hills High School, Craryville

== Cortland County ==
- Cincinnatus Junior/Senior High School, Cincinnatus
- Cortland Christian Academy (private PK-12), Cortland
- Cortland Junior Senior High School, Cortland
- Homer Senior High School, Homer
- Marathon Christian Academy (private PK-12), Marathon
- Marathon High School, Marathon
- McGraw High School, McGraw

== Delaware County ==
- Andes Central School (PK-12), Andes
- Charlotte Valley Central School (PK-12), Davenport
- Delaware Academy (PK-12), Delhi
- Deposit Central School (PK-12), Deposit
- Downsville Central School (K-12), Downsville
- Franklin Central School (PK-12), Franklin
- Hancock Middle/High School, Hancock
- Margaretville Central School (PK-12), Margaretville
- O'Neill (Walton) High School, Walton
- Roxbury Central School (PK-12), Roxbury
- Sidney High School, Sidney
- South Kortright Central School (PK-12), South Kortright
- Stamford Central School (PK-12), Stamford

== Dutchess County ==
=== Public ===
- Arlington High School, LaGrangeville
- Beacon High School, Beacon
- Dover High School, Dover Plains
- John Jay High School, Hopewell Junction
- Roy C. Ketcham High School, Wappingers Falls
- Millbrook High School, Millbrook
- Orchard View Alternative High School, Wappingers Falls
- Pawling High School, Pawling
- Poughkeepsie High School, Poughkeepsie
- Red Hook High School, Red Hook
- Rhinebeck High School, Rhinebeck
- Franklin Delano Roosevelt High School, Hyde Park
- Spackenkill High School, Poughkeepsie
- Stissing Mountain High School, Pine Plains
- Webutuck High School, Amenia

=== Private ===
- Duane Lake Academy, Pawling
- Millbrook School, Millbrook
- Oakwood Friends School, Poughkeepsie
- Our Lady of Lourdes High School, Poughkeepsie
- Poughkeepsie Day School (PK-12), Poughkeepsie
- Trinity-Pawling School, Pawling
- Upton Lake Christian School (K-12), Clinton Corners

== Erie County ==
=== Public ===
- Akron High School, Akron
- Alden High School, Alden
- Alternative Learning Center, West Seneca
- Amherst Central High School, Amherst
- Bennett High School, Buffalo
- Buffalo Academy of Science Charter School, Buffalo
- Buffalo Academy for Visual and Performing Arts (5-12), Buffalo
- Burgard Vocational High School, Buffalo
- Charter School For Applied Technologies (K-12), Buffalo
- Cheektowaga Central High School, Cheektowaga
- City Honors School, Buffalo
- Clarence High School, Clarence
- Cleveland Hill High School, Cheektowaga
- Depew High School, Depew
- East Aurora High School, Aurora
- East High School, Buffalo
- Eden Junior/Senior High School, Eden
- PS 302 Emerson School Of Hospitality, Buffalo
- Frontier Central High School, Hamburg
- Global Concepts Charter High School, Lackawanna
- Grand Island High School, Grand Island
- Hamburg High School, Hamburg
- PS 84 Health Care Center for Children at ECMC, Buffalo
- Holland Junior/Senior High School, Holland
- Hopevale School, Hamburg
- Hutchinson Central Technical High School, Buffalo
- The International Preparatory School, Buffalo
- Iroquois High School, Elma
- Kenmore East High School, Tonawanda (Town)
- Kenmore West Senior High School, Kenmore
- John F. Kennedy High School, Cheektowaga
- Lackawanna High School, Lackawanna
- Lafayette High School, Buffalo
- Lake Shore High School, Angola
- Lancaster High School, Lancaster
- Leonardo da Vinci High School, Buffalo
- Maryvale High School, Cheektowaga
- Math, Science, Technology Preparatory School, Buffalo
- McKinley Vocational High School, Buffalo
- North Collins Junior/Senior High School, North Collins
- PS 42 Occupational Training Center, Buffalo
- Oracle Charter School, Buffalo
- Orchard Park High School, Orchard Park
- PS 208 Riverside Academy, Buffalo
- Riverside Institute of Technology, Buffalo (closed)
- South Park High School, Buffalo
- Springville-Griffith Institute, Springville
- Sweet Home High School, Amherst
- Tapestry Charter School, Buffalo
- Tonawanda High School, Tonawanda
- West Seneca East Senior High School, West Seneca
- West Seneca West Senior High School, West Seneca
- Western New York Maritime Charter School, Buffalo
- Williamsville East High School, East Amherst
- Williamsville North High School, Williamsville
- Williamsville South High School, Williamsville

=== Private ===
- Baker Hall School, Lackawanna
- Baker Victory Services (PK-12), Lackawanna
- The Baptist School (PK-12), Tonawanda
- Bishop Timon – St. Jude High School, Buffalo
- Buffalo Academy of the Sacred Heart, Amherst
- Buffalo Seminary, Buffalo
- Canisius High School, Buffalo
- Cardinal O'Hara High School, Tonawanda
- Center Road Christian Academy (1-12), West Seneca
- Christian Central Academy (K-12), Williamsville
- Gateway-Longview Lynde School (PK-12), Williamsville
- Gow School, South Wales
- Mount Mercy Academy, Buffalo
- Mount St. Mary Academy, Kenmore
- Nardin Academy, Buffalo
- Nichols School, Buffalo
- The Park School of Buffalo (PK-12), Snyder
- St. Francis High School, Athol Springs
- St. Joseph's Collegiate Institute, Buffalo
- St. Mary's High School, Lancaster
- St. Mary's School For The Deaf (PK-12), Buffalo
- West Seneca Christian School (PK-12), West Seneca

== Essex County ==
- Crown Point Central School (PK-12), Crown Point
- Elizabethtown-Lewis Central School (K-12), Elizabethtown
- Keene Central School (K-12), Keene Valley
- Lake Placid Middle/High School, Lake Placid
- Minerva Central School (PK-12), Olmstedville
- Moriah Junior/Senior High School, Port Henry
- Mountainside Christian Academy (private PK-12), Schroon Lake
- National Sports Academy (private), Lake Placid
- Newcomb Central School (PK-12), Newcomb
- Northwood School (private), Lake Placid
- Schroon Lake Central School (K-12), Schroon Lake
- Ticonderoga High School, Ticonderoga
- Westport Central School (K-12), Westport
- Willsboro Central School (PK-12), Willsboro

== Franklin County ==
- Brushton-Moira High School, Brushton
- Chateaugay High School, Chateaugay
- Franklin Academy (New York), Malone
- Saint Regis Falls Central School, St. Regis Falls
- Salmon River High School, Fort Covington
- Saranac Lake High School, Saranac Lake
- Tupper Lake Middle-High School, Tupper Lake

== Fulton County ==
- Broadalbin-Perth High School, Broadalbin
- Gloversville High School, Gloversville
- Johnstown High School, Johnstown
- Mayfield Central School, Mayfield
- Northville High School, Northville
- Perth Bible Christian Academy (private PK-12), Amsterdam

== Genesee County ==
- Alexander Middle-High School, Alexander
- Batavia High School, Batavia
- Byron-Bergen Junior/Senior High School, Bergen
- Elba Junior/Senior High School, Elba
- Le Roy Junior/Senior High School, Le Roy
- Notre Dame High School, Batavia
- Oakfield-Alabama Middle/High School, Oakfield
- Pavilion Middle/High School, Pavilion
- Pembroke Junior/Senior High School, Corfu

== Greene County ==
- Cairo-Durham High School, Cairo
- Catskill High School, Catskill
- Coxsackie-Athens High School, Coxsackie
- Grapeville Christian School (private K-12), Climax
- Greenville High School, Greenville
- Hunter-Tannersville Middle / High School, Tannersville
- Windham-Ashland-Jewett Central School (K-12), Windham

== Hamilton County ==
- Indian Lake Central School (PK-12), Indian Lake
- Long Lake Central School (PK-12), Long Lake
- Wells School (PK-12), Wells

== Herkimer County ==
- Central Valley Academy, Ilion
- Dolgeville Jr./Sr. High School, Dolgeville
- Frankfort-Schuyler High School, Frankfort
- Herkimer High School, Herkimer
- Little Falls High School, Little Falls
- Mohawk Valley Christian Academy (private K-12), Little Falls
- Mount Markham High School, West Winfield
- Poland Central School, Poland
- Town of Webb School, Old Forge
- West Canada Valley Middle/High School, Newport
- Owen D. Young Central School (K-12), Van Hornesville

== Jefferson County ==
- Alexandria Central School, Alexandria Bay
- Belleville-Henderson Central School (PK-12), Belleville
- Carthage Senior High School, Carthage
- Faith Fellowship Christian School (private PK-12), Watertown
- General Brown Junior-Senior High School, Dexter
- Immaculate Heart Central High School (private), Watertown
- Indian River High School, Philadelphia
- LaFargeville Central School (PK-12), LaFargeville
- Lyme Central School (PK-12), Chaumont
- Sackets Harbor Central School (K-12), Sackets Harbor
- South Jefferson High School, Adams
- Thousand Islands High School, Clayton
- Watertown High School, Watertown

== Lewis County ==
- Beaver River Central School, Beaver Falls
- Copenhagen Central School (PK-12), Copenhagen
- Harrisville Junior/Senior High School, Harrisville
- Lowville Academy, Lowville
- River Valley Mennonite School (private K-12), Castorland
- South Lewis High School, Turin

== Livingston County ==
- Avon High School, Avon
- Caledonia-Mumford High School, Caledonia
- Dansville 7-12 School, Dansville
- Geneseo Middle/High School, Geneseo
- Lima Christian School (private K-12), Lima
- Livonia High School, Livonia
- Mount Morris Junior/Senior High School, Mount Morris
- Nunda Middle & High School, Nunda
- York Middle/High School, Retsof

== Madison County ==
- Brookfield Central School (PK-12), Brookfield
- Canastota High School, Canastota
- Cazenovia High School, Cazenovia
- Chittenango High School, Chittenango
- DeRuyter Central School, DeRuyter
- Hamilton Junior/Senior High School, Hamilton
- Madison Central School (PK-12), Madison
- Morrisville-Eaton Central School, Morrisville
- New Life Christian School (private PK-12), Hamilton
- Oneida Senior High School, Oneida
- Stockbridge Valley Central School (PK-12), Munnsville

== Monroe County ==
=== Public (Rochester City School District) ===
Note that as of 2013 this district is changing school names, campuses and functions rapidly, so the information here may be out of date. Due to these rapid changes, NCES identifiers and data are not available for many schools since that data lags by a year or two.

- All City High
- Charlotte High School
- Douglass Campus
  - Northeast College Preparatory School
  - Northwest College Preparatory School
- East High School
- Edison Campus
  - Robert Brown High School of Construction and Design
  - Leadership Academy for Young Men
  - Rochester STEM High School
- Franklin High School, Rochester
  - Integrated Arts and Technology High School
  - Vanguard Collegiate High School
- Thomas Jefferson High School
  - Rochester International Academy
- James Monroe High School
- School of the Arts
- School Without Walls
- Wilson Magnet High School

=== Schools in other public districts ===
- Arcadia High School, Greece
- Brighton High School, Brighton
- Brockport High School, Brockport
- Churchville-Chili High School, Churchville
- East Rochester Junior-Senior High School, East Rochester
- Eastridge High School, Irondequoit
- Fairport High School, Fairport
- Gates-Chili High School, Gates
- Greece Athena High School, Greece
- Greece Olympia High School, Greece
- Hilton High School, Hilton
- Honeoye Falls–Lima High School, Honeoye Falls
- Irondequoit High School, Irondequoit
- Odyssey Academy, Greece
- Penfield High School, Penfield
- Pittsford Mendon High School, Pittsford
- Pittsford Sutherland High School, Pittsford
- Rochester Academy Charter School, Rochester
- Rush–Henrietta Senior High School, Henrietta
- Spencerport High School, Spencerport
- Webster Schroeder High School, Webster
- Webster Thomas High School, Webster
- Wheatland Chili High School, Scottsville

=== Private ===
- Allendale Columbia School (PK-12), Brighton
- Aquinas Institute, Rochester
- Archangel School (K-12), Rochester
- Cornerstone Christian Academy (K-12), Brockport
- Charles Finney School (K-12), Penfield
- The Harley School (PK-12), Brighton
- Hillside Children's Center - Andrews Trahey Campus (2-12), Rochester
- Hillside Children's Center - Halpern Education Center (6-12), Webster
- The Norman Howard School (4-12), Rochester
- Bishop Kearney High School, Irondequoit
- Lake Ontario Baptist Academy (K-12), Hilton
- Lakeside Alpha / Lakeside Learning (3-12), Webster (also see Talk)
- McQuaid Jesuit High School, Brighton
- Nazareth Academy, Rochester
- Northstar Christian Academy (K-12), Rochester
- Ora Academy, Rochester
- Our Lady of Mercy School for Young Women, Brighton
- Rochester Seventh-day Adventist Academy (PK-12), Scottsville
- Saint Joseph's Villa, Rochester
- Southeast Christian Academy (1-12), Penfield
- Talmudical Institute of Upstate New York, Rochester
- Webster Christian School (PK-12), Webster

== Montgomery County ==
- Amsterdam High School, Amsterdam
- Canajoharie High School, Canajoharie
- Faith Bible Academy (private K-12), Sprakers
- Fonda-Fultonville High School, Fonda
- Fort Plain Junior/Senior High School, Fort Plain
- Oppenheim-Ephratah-St. Johnsville High School, St. Johnsville
- Victory Christian Academy (private PK-12), Fort Plain

== Nassau County ==
=== Public ===
- Baldwin Senior High School, Baldwin
- Bethpage High School, Bethpage
- Castleton Academy High School of Oceanside, Oceanside
- Carle Place Middle/High School, Carle Place
- Division Avenue High School, Levittown
- East Meadow High School, East Meadow
- East Rockaway High School, East Rockaway
- Elmont Memorial Junior – Senior High School, Elmont
- Farmingdale High School, Farmingdale
- Floral Park Memorial High School, Floral Park
- Freeport High School, Freeport
- Garden City High School, Garden City
- Glen Cove High School, Glen Cove
- Great Neck North High School, Great Neck
- Great Neck South High School, Great Neck
- H. Frank Carey Junior-Senior High School, Franklin Square
- Harriet Eisman Community School, Long Beach
- Hempstead High School, Hempstead
- Herricks High School, New Hyde Park
- George W. Hewlett High School, Hewlett
- Hicksville High School, Hicksville
- Island Trees High School, Levittown
- Jericho High School, Jericho
- John F. Kennedy High School, Bellmore
- Lawrence High School, Cedarhurst
- Locust Valley High School, Locust Valley
- Long Beach High School, Long Beach
- Lynbrook Senior High School, Lynbrook
- General Douglas MacArthur High School, Levittown
- Malverne High School, Malverne
- Manhasset Secondary School, Manhasset
- Massapequa High School, Massapequa
- Wellington C. Mepham High School, Bellmore
- Mineola High School, Garden City Park
- New Hyde Park Memorial High School, New Hyde Park
- North Shore High School, Glen Head
- Oceanside High School, Oceanside
- Oyster Bay High School, Oyster Bay
- Paul D. Schreiber Senior High School, Port Washington
- Plainedge High School, Massapequa
- Plainview – Old Bethpage John F. Kennedy High School, Plainview
- Roosevelt High School, Roosevelt
- Roslyn High School, Roslyn Heights
- Sanford H. Calhoun High School, Merrick
- Seaford High School, Seaford
- Sewanhaka High School, Floral Park
- South Side High School, Rockville Centre
- Syosset High School, Syosset
- Uniondale High School, Uniondale
- Valley Stream Central High School, Valley Stream
- Valley Stream North High School, Franklin Square
- Valley Stream South High School, Valley Stream
- Village School, Great Neck
- W. Tresper Clarke High School, Westbury
- Wantagh Senior High School, Wantagh
- West Hempstead High School, West Hempstead
- Westbury High School, Old Westbury
- The Wheatley School, Old Westbury

=== Private ===
- Stella K. Abraham High School for Girls, Hewlett Bay Park
- Chaminade High School, Mineola
- Crescent School (K-12), Hempstead
- Harriet Eisman Community School, Long Beach
- Friends Academy (PK-12), Locust Valley
- Grace Christian Academy (K-12), Merrick
- Harmony Heights School (8-12), East Norwich
- Hebrew Academy of the Five Towns and Rockaway, Cedarhurst
- Hebrew Academy of Long Beach, Long Beach
- Hebrew Academy of Nassau County (7-12), Uniondale
- Holy Trinity Diocesan High School, Hicksville
- Kellenberg Memorial High School (6-12), Uniondale
- Lawrence Woodmere Academy (PK-12), Woodmere
- Long Island Lutheran Middle and High School (6-12), Brookville
- Mesivta Ateres Yaakov, Lawrence
- Mesivta School of Long Beach (AKA Torah High School), Long Beach
- Midreshet Shalhevet High School For Girls, North Woodmere
- Mill Neck Manor School For The Deaf (PK-12), Mill Neck
- New Jerusalem Christian Academy (1-12), Farmingdale
- North Shore Hebrew Academy, Great Neck
- Our Lady of Mercy Academy, Syosset
- Portledge School (PK-12), Locust Valley
- Rambam Mesivta, Lawrence
- Sacred Heart Academy, Hempstead
- Schechter School of Long Island (K-12), Williston Park
- St. Dominic High School, Oyster Bay
- St. Mary's High School, Manhasset
- Valley Stream Christian Academy (K-12), Valley Stream
- Vincent Smith School (4-12), Port Washington
- Henry Viscardi School (PK-12), Albertson
- The Waldorf School Of Garden City (PK-12), Garden City
- Westbrook Preparatory School, Westbury
- Woodward Mental Health Center (K-12), Freeport

== Niagara County ==
- Barker Junior/Senior High School, Barker
- Christian Academy of Western New York (private PK-12), North Tonawanda
- Henrietta G Lewis Campus School (private 2-12), Lockport (town)
- Lewiston-Porter High School, Youngstown
- Lockport High School, Lockport (city)
- Newfane High School, Newfane
- Niagara Falls High School, Niagara Falls
- Niagara-Wheatfield High School, Sanborn
- North Tonawanda High School, North Tonawanda
- Royalton-Hartland Junior/Senior High School, Middleport
- Starpoint High School, Pendleton
- Wilson High School, Wilson

== Oneida County ==
=== Public ===
- Adirondack High School, Boonville
- Camden High School, Camden
- Clinton High School, Clinton
- Holland Patent High School, Holland Patent
- New Hartford Senior High School, New Hartford
- New York Mills Junior/Senior High School, New York Mills
- Oriskany Junior/Senior High School, Oriskany
- Thomas R. Proctor High School, Utica
- Remsen Junior/Senior High School, Remsen
- Rome Free Academy, Rome
- Sauquoit Valley High School, Sauquoit
- Vernon-Verona-Sherrill High School, Verona
- Waterville Central Jr./Sr. High School, Waterville
- Westmoreland High School, Westmoreland
- Whitesboro High School, Marcy

=== Private ===
- Faith Christian School (2-12), Bridgewater (village)
- Holy Cross Academy, Vernon (Oneida mailing address)
- Notre Dame Junior Senior High School, Utica
- Rome Catholic Junior/Senior High School, Rome
- Tilton School (1-12), Utica
- Tradewinds Education Center (K-12), Utica

== Onondaga County ==
- Bishop Ludden Junior/Senior High School, Syracuse
- Charles W. Baker High School, Baldwinsville
- Christian Brothers Academy, DeWitt
- Cicero–North Syracuse High School, Cicero
- Corcoran High School, Syracuse
- East Syracuse-Minoa Central High School, East Syracuse
- Fabius-Pompey High School, Fabius
- Faith Heritage School, Syracuse
- Fayetteville–Manlius High School, Manlius
- George Fowler High School, Syracuse
- Henninger High School, Syracuse
- Institute of Technology at Syracuse Central, Syracuse
- Jamesville-DeWitt High School, DeWitt
- Jordan-Elbridge High School, Jordan
- LaFayette Junior/Senior High School, LaFayette
- Liverpool High School, Liverpool
- Living Word Academy, East Syracuse
- Manlius Pebble Hill School, DeWitt
- Marcellus High School, Marcellus
- Nottingham High School, Syracuse
- Onondaga Junior/Senior High School, Nedrow
- Skaneateles High School, Skaneateles
- Solvay High School, Solvay
- Tully Junior Senior High School, Tully
- West Genesee High School, Camillus
- Westhill Senior High School, Syracuse

== Ontario County ==
- Bloomfield High School, Bloomfield
- Canandaigua Academy, Canandaigua
- Geneva High School, Geneva
- Honeoye High School, Richmond
- Midlakes High School, Clifton Springs
- Naples High School, Naples
- Red Jacket High School, Shortsville
- Victor Senior High School, Victor
- Marcus Whitman High School, Rushville

== Orange County ==
- George F. Baker High School, Tuxedo Park
- John S. Burke Catholic High School, Goshen
- Canterbury Brook Academy of the Arts, Newburgh
- Chester Academy, Chester
- Cornwall Central High School, New Windsor
- Goshen Central High School, Goshen
- Middletown High School, Middletown
- Minisink Valley High School, Slate Hill
- Monroe-Woodbury High School, Central Valley
- New York Military Academy (residential), Cornwall-on-Hudson
- Newburgh Free Academy, Newburgh
- James I. O'Neill High School, Fort Montgomery
- Pine Bush High School, Pine Bush
- Port Jervis High School, Port Jervis
- S. S. Seward Institute, Florida
- Storm King School, Cornwall-on-Hudson
- Valley Central High School, Montgomery
- Warwick Valley High School, Warwick
- Washingtonville High School, Washingtonville
- United States Military Academy Preparatory School, West Point

== Orleans County ==
- Albion High School, Albion
- Holley Junior/Senior High School, Holley
- Kendall Junior/Senior High School, Kendall
- Medina High School, Medina
- L.A. Webber High School, Lyndonville

== Oswego County ==
- Altmar-Parish-Williamstown High School, Parish
- John C. Birdlebough High School, Phoenix
- G. Ray Bodley High School, Fulton
- Hannibal High School, Hannibal
- Mexico High School, Mexico
- Paul V. Moore High School, Central Square
- Oswego High School, Oswego
- Pulaski Junior/Senior High School, Pulaski
- Sandy Creek High School, Sandy Creek

== Otsego County ==
- Cherry Valley-Springfield Junior/Senior High School, Cherry Valley
- Cooperstown Junior/Senior High School, Cooperstown
- Edmeston Middle & High School, Edmeston
- Franklin Junior/Senior High School, Franklin
- Gilbertsville-Mount Upton Junior/Senior High School, Gilbertsville
- Laurens Junior/Senior High School, Laurens
- Milford Junior/Senior High School, Milford
- Morris Junior/Senior High School, Morris
- Oneonta High School, Oneonta
- Schenevus Junior/Senior High School, Schenevus
- Unatego Junior/Senior High School, Otego
- Worcester Junior/Senior High School, Worcester

== Putnam County ==
=== Public ===
- Brewster High School, Brewster
- Carmel High School, Carmel
- Haldane High School, Cold Spring
- Mahopac High School, Mahopac
- Putnam Valley High School, Putnam Valley

=== Private ===
- Longview School, Brewster (PK-12)

== Rensselaer County ==
- Averill Park High School, Averill Park
- Berlin Central High School, Berlin
- Columbia High School, East Greenbush
- Hoosac School, Hoosick
- Hoosic Valley High School, Schaghticoke
- Hoosick Falls High School, Hoosick Falls
- La Salle Institute, Troy
- Lansingburgh High School, Troy
- Maple Hill High School, Castleton
- Rensselaer High School, Rensselaer
- Tamarac Secondary School, Troy
- Tech Valley High School, Rensselaer
- Troy High School, Troy
- Vanderheyden School, Wynantskill
- Emma Willard School, Troy

== Rockland County ==
- Albertus Magnus High School, Bardonia
- Bais Yaakov of Ramapo School, Monsey
- Bais Yaakov of Spring Valley School, Monsey
- Bat Torah Academy, Suffern
- Clarkstown High School North, New City
- Clarkstown High School South, West Nyack
- Congregation Mesifta Ohr Hatal School, Monsey
- Mesivta Beth Shraga School, Monsey
- Mesivta Ohr Naftoli School, Monsey
- Nanuet Senior High School, Nanuet
- North Rockland High School, Thiells
- Nyack High School, Upper Nyack
- Pearl River High School, Pearl River
- Ramapo High School, Town of Ramapo
- Shaarei Torah School of Rockland, Suffern
- Spring Valley High School, Spring Valley
- Suffern High School, Suffern
- Summit Children's Residence Center, Nyack
- Tappan Zee High School, Orangeburg
- Yeshiva Ahavath Israel-Bnos Visnitz, Monsey
- Yeshiva Gedola School of South Monsey, Monsey
- Yeshiva High School of Monsey, Monsey
- Yeshiva Ohr Reuven School, Suffern
- Yeshiva Ohel Torah School, Monsey
- Yeshiva Shaar Ephraim School, Monsey

== St. Lawrence County ==
- Brasher Falls Middle/Senior High School, Brasher Falls; district known locally known as St. Lawrence Central (see below)
- Clifton-Fine Junior/Senior High School, Star Lake
- Colton-Pierrepont Junior/Senior High School, Colton
- Edwards-Knox Junior/Senior High School, Russell
- Edwin Gould
- Gouverneur Junior/Senior High School, Gouverneur
- Hammond Junior/Senior High School, Hammond
- Heuvelton Junior/Senior High School, Heuvelton
- Hermon-Dekalb Junior/Senior High School, Dekalb Junction
- Lisbon Junior/Senior High School, Lisbon
- Madrid–Waddington Central School, Madrid
- Massena Central High School, Massena
- Morristown Junior/Senior High School, Morristown
- Norwood-Norfolk Junior/Senior High School, Norwood
- Ogdensburg Free Academy, Ogdensburg
- Parishville-Hopkinton Junior/Senior High School, Parishville
- Potsdam High School, Potsdam
- St. Lawrence High School, Brasher Falls
- H.C. Williams High School, Canton

== Saratoga County ==
- Ballston Spa High School, Ballston Spa
- Burnt Hills-Ballston Lake High School, Burnt Hills
- Corinth High School, Corinth
- Galway High School, Galway
- Mechanicville High School, Mechanicville
- Saratoga Central Catholic High School, Saratoga Springs
- Saratoga Springs High School, Saratoga Springs
- Schuylerville Junior/Senior High School, Schuylerville
- Shenendehowa High School, Clifton Park
- South Glens Falls High School, South Glens Falls
- Stillwater CSD High School, Stillwater
- Waterford High School, Waterford

== Schenectady County ==
- Duanesburg High School, Delanson
- Mohonasen High School, Rotterdam
- Notre Dame-Bishop Gibbons High School, Schenectady
- Niskayuna High School, Niskayuna
- Oak Hill School , Glenville
- Schalmont High School, Rotterdam
- Schenectady Christian School, Scotia
- Schenectady High School, Schenectady
- Scotia-Glenville High School, Scotia

== Schoharie County ==
- Cobleskill-Richmondville High School, Richmondville
- Gilboa-Conesville Central School, Gilboa
- Middleburgh High School, Middleburg
- Schoharie High School, Schoharie

== Schuyler County ==
- Odessa-Montour Junior/Senior High School, Odessa
- Watkins Glen Central High School, Watkins Glen

== Seneca County ==
- Mynderse Academy, Seneca Falls
- Romulus Junior/Senior High School, Romulus
- South Seneca Junior/Senior High School, Ovid
- Waterloo High School, Waterloo

== Steuben County ==
- Addison High School, Addison
- Arkport Central, Arkport
- Bradford Central School, Bradford
- Campbell-Savona Middle High School, Campbell
- Canisteo Junior/Senior High School, Canisteo
- Corning-Painted Post East High School, Corning
- Corning-Painted Post West High School, Painted Post
- Hammondsport Junior/Senior High School, Hammondsport
- Haverling High School, Bath
- Hornell High School, Hornell
- Jasper-Troupsburg Junior/Senior High School, Jasper
- Prattsburgh Central School, Prattsburgh
- Wayland-Cohocton High School, Wayland

== Suffolk County ==
- Academy of Saint Joseph's High School, Brentwood
- Amityville Memorial High School, Amityville
- Babylon Junior/Senior High School, Babylon
- Bay Shore High School, Bay Shore
- Bayport-Blue Point High School, Bayport
- Bellport High School, Brookhaven
- Brentwood High School, Brentwood
- Bridgehampton School, Bridgehampton
- Center Moriches High School, Center Moriches
- Centereach High School, Centereach
- Central Islip Senior High School, Central Islip
- Cold Spring Harbor Jr./Sr. High School, Cold Spring Harbor
- Commack High School, Commack
- Comsewogue High School, Port Jefferson Station
- Connetquot High School, Bohemia
- Deer Park High School, Deer Park
- East Hampton High School, East Hampton
- East Islip High School, Islip Terrace
- Eastport South Manor Junior-Senior High School, Manorville
- John Glenn High School, Elwood
- Fishers Island School, Fishers Island
- Greenport High School, Greenport
- Half Hollow Hills High School East, Dix Hills
- Half Hollow Hills High School West, Dix Hills
- Hampton Bays High School, Hampton Bays
- Harborfields High School, Greenlawn
- Hauppauge High School, Hauppauge
- Huntington High School, Huntington
- Islip High School, Islip
- Kings Park High School, Kings Park
- The Knox School, Saint James
- Lake Grove School, Lake Grove
- Lindenhurst Senior High School, Lindenhurst
- Longwood High School, Middle Island
- Mattituck-Cutchogue Junior/Senior High School, Mattituck
- Mercy High School, Riverhead
- Miller Place High School, Miller Place
- Mount Sinai High School, Mount Sinai
- Newfield High School, Selden
- North Babylon High School, North Babylon
- Northport High School, Northport
- Patchogue-Medford High School, Medford
- Pierson High School, Sag Harbor
- Riverhead High School, Riverhead
- Rocky Point High School, Rocky Point
- Ross School, East Hampton
- Sachem High School East, Farmingville
- Sachem High School North, Lake Ronkonkoma
- St. Anthony's High School, South Huntington
- St. John the Baptist Diocesan High School, West Islip
- Sappo School, Medford
- Sayville High School, West Sayville
- Shoreham-Wading River High School, Shoreham
- Smithtown Christian School, Smithtown
- Smithtown High School West, Smithtown
- Smithtown High School East, Saint James
- Southampton High School, Southampton
- Southold Junior/Senior High School, Southold
- The Stony Brook School, Stony Brook
- Torah Academy of Suffolk County, Commack
- Earl L. Vandermeulen High School, Port Jefferson
- Walter G. O'Connell Copiague High School, Copiague
- Ward Melville High School, Setauket
- West Babylon High School, West Babylon
- West Islip High School, West Islip
- Westhampton Beach High School, Westhampton Beach
- Walt Whitman High School, Huntington Station
- William Floyd High School, Mastic Beach
- Wyandanch Memorial High School, Wyandanch

== Sullivan County ==
- Eldred Junior/Senior High School, Eldred
- Fallsburg Jr./Sr. High School, Fallsburg
- Liberty High School, Liberty
- Monticello High School, Monticello
- Rockland Middle/High School, Livingston Manor
- Sullivan West Central School, Lake Huntington
- Tri-Valley Central School, Grahamsville

== Tioga County ==
- Candor Junior/Senior High School, Candor
- Newark Valley High School, Newark Valley
- Owego Free Academy, Owego
- Spencer-Van Etten Middle/High School, Spencer
- Tioga High School, Tioga Center
- Waverly High School, Waverly

== Tompkins County ==
- Charles O. Dickerson High School, Trumansburg
- Dryden High School, Dryden
- Groton High School, Groton
- Ithaca High School, Ithaca
- Lansing High School, Lansing
- Lehman Alternative Community School
- Newfield High School, Newfield
- George Junior Republic School, Freeville

== Ulster County ==
- Ellenville High School, Ellenville
- Highland High School, Highland
- Highland Residential Center, Highland
- Kingston High School, Kingston
- Marlboro High School, Marlboro
- New Paltz High School, New Paltz
- Onteora High School, Boiceville
- Rondout Valley High School, Accord
- Saugerties High School, Saugerties
- Wallkill Senior High School, Wallkill
- Woodstock Day School, Saugerties

== Warren County ==
- Bolton Central School District, Bolton
- Glens Falls High School, Glens Falls
- Hadley-Luzerne High School, Lake Luzerne
- Lake George Junior-Senior High School, Lake George
- North Warren Central School, Chestertown
- Queensbury High School, Queensbury
- Warrensburg Junior/Senior High School, Warrensburg

== Washington County ==
- The Adirondack School of Northeastern New York, Greenwich
- Argyle High School, Argyle
- Cambridge Junior/Senior High School, Cambridge
- Granville Junior/Senior High School, Granville
- Greenwich Junior/Senior High School, Greenwich
- Hudson Falls High School, Hudson Falls
- Salem High School, Salem
- Whitehall Junior/Senior High School, Whitehall

== Wayne County ==
- Clyde-Savannah High School, Clyde
- James A. Beneway High School, Ontario Center
- Lyons High School, Lyons
- Marion Junior/Senior High School, Marion
- Newark High School, Newark
- North Rose-Wolcott High School, Wolcott
- Palmyra-Macedon High School, Palmyra
- Red Creek High School, Red Creek
- Ruben A. Cirillo High School, Walworth
- Sodus High School, Sodus
- Williamson Senior High School, Williamson

== Westchester County ==
- Archbishop Stepinac High School, White Plains
- Ardsley High School, Ardsley
- Blessed Sacrament-St. Gabriel High School, New Rochelle
- Blind Brook High School, Rye Brook
- Briarcliff High School, Briarcliff Manor
- Bronxville High School, Bronxville
- Byram Hills High School, Armonk
- Croton-Harmon High School, Croton-on-Hudson
- Dobbs Ferry High School, Dobbs Ferry
- Early College High School, Yonkers
- Eastchester High School, Eastchester
- Edgemont Junior – Senior High School, Greenburgh
- Fox Lane High School, Bedford
- Gorton High School, Yonkers
- Horace Greeley High School, Chappaqua
- Greenburgh Eleven High School, Dobbs Ferry
- Alexander Hamilton Jr./Sr. High School, Elmsford
- Harrison High School, Harrison
- Hastings High School, Hastings-on-Hudson
- Hawthorne-Cedar Knolls High School, Hawthorne
- Hendrick Hudson High School, Montrose
- High School of Travel & Tourism, Yonkers
- Iona Preparatory School, New Rochelle
- Irvington High School, Irvington
- Ives School, Lincolndale
- John Jay High School, Cross River
- Karafin School, Mount Kisco
- Keio Academy of New York, Purchase
- John F. Kennedy Catholic Preparatory School, Somers
- Martin Luther King High School, Hastings-on-Hudson
- Lakeland High School, Shrub Oak
- Lincoln High School, Yonkers
- Linden Hill Residential Treatment Facility, Hawthorne
- Mamaroneck High School, Mamaroneck
- Nelson Mandela Community High School, Mount Vernon
- Maria Regina High School, Hartsdale
- Mount Vernon High School, Mount Vernon
- New Rochelle High School, New Rochelle
- North Salem Middle/High School, North Salem
- Ohr Hameir Boys Yeshiva School, Peekskill
- Ossining High School, Ossining
- Our Lady of Victory Academy, Dobbs Ferry
- Palisade Preparatory School, Yonkers
- Walter Panas High School, Cortlandt Manor
- Park Street School, Peekskill
- Peekskill High School, Peekskill
- Pelham Memorial High School, Pelham
- Phoenix High School, Shrub Oak
- Pleasantville High School, Pleasantville
- Port Chester High School, Rye Brook
- Riverside High School for Engineering and Design, Yonkers
- Roosevelt High School, Yonkers
- Rye High School, Rye
- Rye Neck High School, Mamaroneck
- Sacred Heart High School, Yonkers
- Salesian High School, New Rochelle
- Saunders Trades and Technical High School, Yonkers
- Scarsdale High School, Scarsdale
- Sleepy Hollow High School, Sleepy Hollow
- Solomon Schechter School of Westchester, Hartsdale
- Somers High School, Somers
- Tuckahoe High School, Eastchester
- The Ursuline School, New Rochelle
- Valhalla High School, Valhalla
- Westchester Hebrew High School, Mamaroneck
- Westlake High School, Thornwood
- White Plains High School, White Plains
- Woodlands High School, Hartsdale
- Yonkers High School, Yonkers
- Yonkers Montessori Academy, Yonkers
- Yorktown High School, Yorktown Heights

Additional schools

== Wyoming County ==
- Attica High School, Attica
- Letchworth High School, Gainesville
- Perry High School, Perry
- Warsaw Junior/Senior High School, Warsaw

== Yates County ==
- Dundee Junior/Senior High School, Dundee
- Penn Yan Academy, Penn Yan

== See also ==
- List of school districts in New York
