= New York State Public High School Athletic Association =

Governing body of interscholastic sports

- Abbreviation: NYSPHSAA
- Formation: 1923
- Legal status: Association
- Purpose: Athletic/Educational
- Headquarters: 8 Airport Park Blvd. Latham, New York 12110, United States
- Region served: New York
- Members: 768 high schools
- Executive Director: Dr. Robert J. Zayas
- Affiliations: National Federation of State High School Associations
- Staff: 9
- Website: Official website

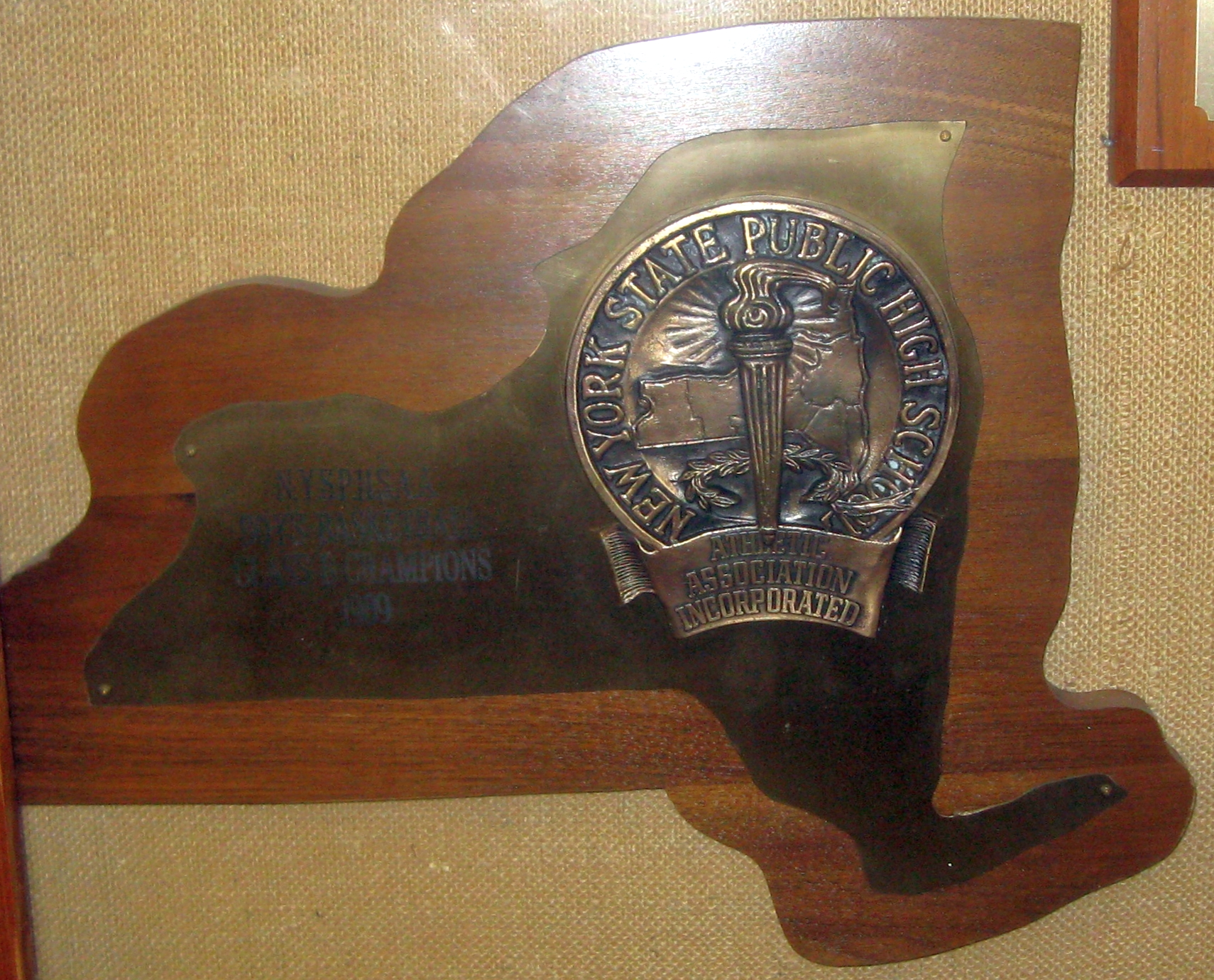
1989 basketball championship trophy in East Hampton, New York

The New York State Public High School Athletic Association (NYSPHSAA) is the governing body of interscholastic sports for most public schools in the U.S. state of New York, outside of New York City. The organization was created in 1923, after a predecessor organization called the New York State Public High School Association of Basketball Leagues began in 1921 to bring consistency to eligibility rules and to conduct state tournaments. It consists of 768 member high schools from the state divided into 11 geographic sections.

While as its name suggests the vast majority of its members are public, it does include a number of private and Catholic high schools. Most of these are located in Central New York and the Capital District, where parallel sanctioning bodies for private schools (like the MMAA in Western New York, the CHSAA in Metropolitan New York, or various leagues in and around New York City) do not exist. It is a member of the National Federation of State High School Associations as well as the New York State Federation of Secondary School Athletic Associations.

== NYSPHSAA sports ==
The NYSPHSAA acknowledges 23 sports and holds over 30 championship events throughout 3 seasons: Fall, Winter and Spring.

Fall Sports

- Boys Cross Country
- Girls Cross Country
- Field Hockey
- Football
- Boys Gymnastics (Regional)
- Girls Gymnastics
- Boys Soccer
- Girls Soccer
- Game Day Cheer
- Girls Swimming and Diving
- Girls Tennis
- Boys Volleyball
- Girls Volleyball

Winter Sports

- Boys Basketball
- Girls Basketball
- Boys Bowling
- Girls Bowling
- Competitive Cheer
- Boys Ice hockey
- Boys Indoor Track and Field
- Girls Indoor Track and Field
- Rifle
- Boys Nordic Skiing
- Girls Nordic Skiing
- Boys Alpine Skiing
- Girls Alpine Skiing
- Boys Swimming and Diving
- Boys Volleyball (Regional)
- Girls Volleyball (Regional)
- Wrestling

Spring Sports

- Baseball
- Boys Golf
- Girls Golf
- Boys Lacrosse
- Girls Lacrosse
- Softball
- Boys Tennis
- Boys Outdoor Track and Field
- Girls Outdoor Track and Field
- Flag Football

== Sections ==
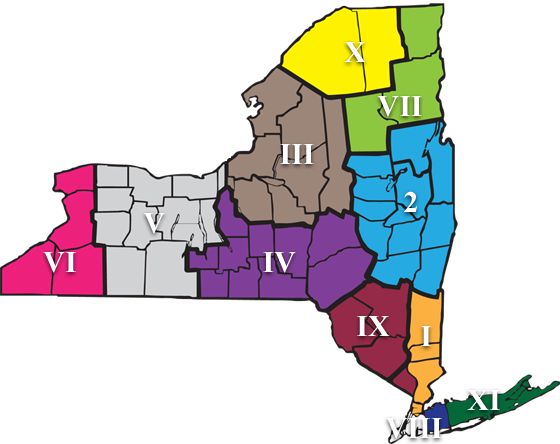
Map of NYSPHSAA sections

The NYSPHSAA is divided into eleven sections by geographical areas. The official membership list is at the NYSPHSAA site.

Each section is further divided into classes, by school enrollment size. The classes are, from largest schools to smallest, AAA, AA, A, B, C, and D, though the classifications and enrollment numbers for each classification vary by sport.

Schools will sometimes compete with other schools outside of the section in tournaments or invitationals. The section is further divided into leagues based on mostly location but also the size of the school. The schools in the section compete with each other over the course of three seasons, fall, winter, and spring.

Typically, each section holds a sectional championship tournament in each sport and class. The sectional champions then meet first in regional competition, then in state competition, to determine the state champion in each class.

=== Section 1 ===
==== Overview ====
Location: Dutchess, Putnam, Rockland, Westchester Counties
Section 1 offers "modified athletics" administration covering grades 7-9 middle school competition in area middle schools (grade 9 is officially part of the high school level).

==== Schools ====
- Albertus Magnus High School
- Alexander Hamilton
- Ardsley High School
- Arlington High School
- Barack Obama School for Social Justice
- Blind Brook High School
- Brewster High School
- Briarcliff High School
- Bronxville High School
- Byram Hills High School
- Carmel High School
- Clarkstown High School North (New City, New York)
- Clarkstown High School South (West Nyack, New York)
- Croton-Harmon High School
- Dobbs Ferry High School
- Eastchester High School
- Edgemont Junior – Senior High School
- Fox Lane High School
- Gorton
- Greenburgh-New Castle High School
- Haldane High School
- Harrison High School
- Hastings High School
- Hendrick Hudson High School
- Horace Greeley High School
- Irvington High School
- John Jay High School
- John Jay Senior High School
- Keio
- Lakeland High School
- Leffel
- Lincoln
- Mahopac High School
- Mamaroneck High School
- Mt Vernon High School
- Nanuet Senior High School
- New Rochelle High School
- North Rockland High School
- North Salem High School
- Nyack High School
- Ossining High School
- Pawling High School
- Pearl River High School
- Peekskill High School
- Pelham Memorial High School
- Pleasantville High School
- Port Chester High School
- Poughkeepsie High School
- Putnam Valley High School
- Ramapo High School
- Riverside
- Roosevelt
- Ketcham High School
- Rye High School
- Rye Neck High School
- Saunders
- Scarsdale High School
- Sleepy Hollow High School
- Somers High School
- Spring Valley High School
- Suffern High School
- Tappan Zee High School
- Tuckahoe High School
- Ursuline
- Valhalla High School
- Walter Panas High School
- Westlake High School
- White Plains High School
- Woodlands Senior High School
- Yonkers MS/HS
- Yonkers Montessori Academy
- Yorktown High School

=== Section 2 ===
==== Overview ====
Location: Capital District
Section 2 is made up of high schools from around New York's Capital Region. The section is made up of 9 leagues mostly based on location but also based on size to ensure fair competition. Schools mostly compete with the other schools in their league but will sometimes compete with schools outside of it. This usually happens during the championship season when teams are competing for the section or state title.

==== Leagues ====
Adirondack League

- Argyle High School
- Bolton High School
- Corinth High School
- Fort Ann High School
- Fort Edward High School
- Granville High School
- Hadley-Luzerne High School
- Hartford High School
- Johnsburg High School
- Lake George High School
- North Warren High School
- Salem High School
- Warrensburg High School
- Whitehall High School

Colonial Council

- Academy of the Holy Names
- The Albany Academies
- Catholic Central School (Latham, New York)
- Cobleskill-Richmondville High School
- Cohoes High School
- Ichabod Crane High School
- Lansingburgh High School
- La Salle Institute
- Mohonasen High School
- Ravena-Coeymans-Selkirk High School
- Schalmont High School
- Troy High School
- Voorheesville High School

Foothills Council

- Amsterdam High School
- Broadalbin-Perth High School
- Glens Falls High School
- Gloversville High School
- Hudson Falls High School
- Queensbury High School
- Schuylerville High School
- Scotia-Glenville High School
- South Glens Falls Senior High School

Patroon Conference

- Albany Leadership Charter High School for Girls
- Cairo-Durham High School
- Catskill High School
- Chatham High School
- Coxsackie-Athens High School
- Germantown High School
- Green Tech Charter High School
- Greenville High School
- Hudson High School
- Maple Hill High School
- Rensselaer High School
- Taconic Hills High School
- Watervliet High School

Suburban Council

- Albany High School
- Averill Park High School
- Ballston Spa High School
- Bethlehem High School
- Burnt Hills-Ballston Lake High School
- Christian Brothers Academy
- Colonie High School
- Columbia High School
- Guilderland High School
- Niskayuna High School
- Saratoga Springs High School
- Schenectady High School
- Shaker High School
- Shenendehowa High School

Wasaren

- Berlin High School
- Cambridge High School
- Emma Willard School
- Greenwich High School
- Hoosic Valley High School
- Hoosick Falls High School
- Mechanicville High School
- New Lebanon High School
- Saratoga Central Catholic High School
- Stillwater High School
- Tamarac High School
- Waterford-Halfmoon High School

Western Athletic Conference

- Berne-Knox-Westerlo High School
- Canajoharie High School
- Duanesburg High School
- Fonda-Fultonville High School
- Fort Plain High School
- Galway High School
- Mayfield High School
- Johnstown High School
- Mekeel Christian Academy
- Middleburgh High School
- Northville High School
- Notre Dame-Bishop Gibbons High School
- Oppenheim-Ephratah-St.Johnsville High School
- Schoharie High School

Independents

- Doane Stuart School
- Heatly High School
- Hawthorne Valley
- KIPP Capital Region Charter School
- Loudonville Christian School

=== Section 3 ===
==== Overview ====
Location: Central New York Section 3 comprises seven leagues, some of which are further broken down into smaller groups. The following is the list of leagues with their member schools in order of size, from largest to smallest, based on the number of schools in the league.

==== Leagues ====
===== Onondaga High School League =====
The OHSL divides itself into three conferences based mostly on the size of the school. It is not exact, however, because of reclassifications. The Freedom Conference comprises Class A schools, the Liberty Conference comprises Class B schools, and the Patriot Conference comprises Class C and D schools.

Freedom Conference

- Chittenango High School
- Cortland High School
- East Syracuse-Minoa High School
- George Fowler High School
- Fulton High School
- Jamesville-Dewitt High School
- Mexico High School
- Phoenix High School

Liberty Conference

- Cazenovia High School
- Christian Brothers Academy
- Hannibal High School
- Homer High School
- Jordan-Elbridge High School
- Marcellus High School
- Skaneateles High School
- Solvay High School
- Westhill High School

Patriot Conference

- Bishop Grimes High School
- Bishop Ludden High School
- Cato-Meridian High School
- Fabius-Pompey High School
- Faith Heritage School
- Institute of Technology
- Lafayette High School
- Manlius Pebble Hill School
- Onondaga High School
- Port Byron High School
- Pulaski High School
- Syracuse Academy of Science
- Tully High School
- Weedsport High School

===== Center State Conference =====
The Center State Conference is broken up into four divisions.

Division I

- Adirondack Central High School
- Canastota High School
- Central Valley High School
- Clinton High School
- Holland Patent Central High School
- Mount Markham High School
- Sherburne-Earlville High School

Division II

- Dolgeville Central High School
- Frankfort-Schuyler High School
- Herkimer High School
- Little Falls High School
- West Canada Valley Central High School

Division III

- Cooperstown Central High School
- Hamilton Central School
- Morrisville-Eaton High School
- Sauquoit Valley Central School
- Waterville Central School
- Westmoreland High School

Division IV

- New York Mills High School
- Oriskany High School
- Owen D Young High School
- Poland Central High School
- Remsen Central School
- Rome Catholic
- Town of Webb School District

===== Frontier =====
Frontier is divided into four divisions.

A Division

- Carthage High School
- Immaculate Heart Central
- Indian River High School
- Watertown High School

B Division

- Altmar-Parish-Williamstown
- General Brown
- Lowville High School
- South Jefferson High School

C Division

- Beaver River High School
- Sandy Creek High School
- South Lewis High School
- Thousand Islands High School

D Division

- Alexandria High School
- Belleville-Henderson High School
- Copenhagen High School
- Lafargeville High School
- Lyme High School
- Sackets Harbor High School

===== CNYCL =====
The CNYCL is broken into five sections.

National

- Charles W. Baker High School
- Cicero-North Syracuse High School
- Henninger High School
- Liverpool High School
- West Genesee High School

American

- Auburn High School
- Central Square High School
- Corcoran High School
- Fayetteville-Manlius High School
- Nottingham High School
- Oswego High School

Tri-Valley

- New Hartford High School
- Notre Dame High School
- Oneida High School
- Rome Free Academy
- Utica Proctor
- Whitesboro High School

Central Counties

- Brookfield High School
- Cincinnatus High School
- DeRuyter High School
- Madison High School
- McGraw High School
- Otselic Valley High School
- Stockbridge Valley High School

Independents

- Blessed Virgin Mary High School
- Camden High School
- Living Word Academy
- Tyburn Academy
- Vernon-Verona-Sherrill High School

=== Section 4 ===
==== Overview ====
Location: Southern Tier

=== Section 5 ===
==== Overview ====
Location: Allegany, Cayuga, Genesee, Livingston, Monroe, Ontario, Orleans, Seneca, Steuben, Wayne, Wyoming, and Yates counties; Genesee Valley

==== Leagues ====
Section V is composed of 5 Athletics Leagues. As of the Spring 2025 Baseball and Softball season, schools were distributed among leagues in the following ways with two schools participating as independents.

Allegany County
- Andover Central School
- Bolivar-Richburg High Schoo
- Cuba-Rushford High School
- Fillmore Central School
- Genesee Valley Central School/Belfast Central School Unified Athletics
- Hinsdale High School
- Scio Central School/Friendship Central School Unified Athletics

Finger Lakes

- Bloomfield High School
- Midlakes High School
- Mynderse Academy
- Newark Valley High School
- Palmyra-Macedon High School
- Penn Yan Academy
- Waterloo High School
- Wayne Senior High School
- Geneva High School
- Dundee Senior High School/Bradford Central School Unified Athletics
- The Harley School/Allendale Columbia School Unified Athletics
- Honeoye High School
- Marcus Whitman High School
- Naples High School
- Red Jacket High School
- Romulus Senior High School/South Seneca Senior High School Unified Athletics

Genesee Region

- Alexander High School
- Attica High School
- Byron–Bergen High School
- Elba Senior High School
- Holley Senior High School
- Lyndonville
- Notre Dame High School
- Oakfield-Alabama High School
- Pembroke Senior High School
- Wheatland-Chili High School

Livingston County

- Avon High School
- Caledonia-Mumford High School
- Dansville 7-12 School
- Geneso High School
- Haverling High School
- Hornell High School
- Keshequa Secondary School
- Le Roy Senior High School
- Letchworth High School
- Livonia High School
- Mount Morris Central School
- Pavilion High School
- Perry High School
- Warsaw Senior High School
- Wayland-Cohocton High School
- York High School

Monroe County

- Batavia High School
- Brighton High School
- Brockport High School
- Canandaigua Academy
- Churchville-Chili High School
- Eastridge High School
- Fairport High School
- Gates Chili High School
- Greece Athena/Greece Olympia Combined Team
- Hilton High School
- Honeoye Falls–Lima High School
- Irondequoit High School
- Penfield High School
- Pittsford Mendon High School
- Pittsford Sutherland High School
- Rush–Henrietta Senior High School
- Spencerport High School
- Victor Senior High School
- Webster Schroeder High School
- Webster Thomas High School

Private Parochial

- The Aquinas Institute of Rochester
- Bishop Kearney High School
- The Charles Finney School
- Eugenio Maria DeHostos Charter School
- Lima Christian School
- Our Lady of Mercy School for Young Women
- Northstar Christian Academy
- Young Women's College Prep Charter School

Rochester City Athletic Conference

- James Monroe High School/School Without Walls/East High School Combined Team
- Padilla High School/World of Inquiry School/Northeast College Preparatory High School Combined Team
- School of the Arts
- Wilson Magnet High School/Rochester Early College International High School Combined Team
- Edison Campus Combined Team

Steuben County

- Addison High School
- Alfred-Almond Senior High School
- Arkport Canaseraga High School
- Avoca Central School/Prattsburgh Central School Combined Team
- Dundee High School/Bradford Central School Combined Team
- Campbell-Savona Central School
- Canisteo-Greenwood High School
- Hammondsport Senior High School
- Jasper-Troupsburg Senior High School

Wayne County

- Clyde-Savannah High School
- East Rochester Senior High School
- Marion Senior High School/Ruben A. Cirillo High School
- Lyons High School
- North Rose-Wolcott High School
- Red Creek High School
- Sodus High School
- Williamson Senior High School

Independents

- Wellsville High School
- McQuaid Jesuit High School

=== Section 6 ===
==== Overview ====
Location: Western New York

=== Section 7 ===
==== Overview ====
Location: Champlain Area

==== Schools ====
- AuSable Valley High School
- Beekmantown High School
- Boquet Valley High School
- Crown Point Central School
- Indian Lake Central School
- Keene Central School
- Lake Placid Middle/High School
- Indian Lake Central School
- Lake Pleasant Central School
- Long Lake Central School
- Minerva Central School
- Moriah Junior/Senior High School
- Newcomb Central School
- Northeastern Clinton High School
- Northern Adirondack Middle/High School
- Peru High School
- Plattsburgh High School
- Saranac High School
- Schroon Lake Central School
- Seton Catholic Central High School
- Ticonderoga High School
- Wells Central School

=== Section 8 ===
==== Overview ====
Location: Nassau County Section 8 is also known as the Nassau County Public High School Athletic Association. It is divided into eight leagues.

==== Leagues ====
A A

- Farmingdale High School
- Freeport High School
- Hempstead High School
- Massapequa High School
- Oceanside High School
- Syosset High School
- Uniondale High School

A

- Baldwin Senior High School
- East Meadow High School
- General Douglas Macarthur High School
- Herricks High School
- Hicksville High School
- John F Kennedy High School, Plainview
- Paul D. Schreiber Senior High School

B A

- Calhoun High School
- Great Neck South High School
- H. Frank Carey Junior-Senior High School
- John F Kennedy High School, Bellmore
- Long Beach High School
- Valley Stream Central High School
- WC Mepham High School

B

- Division Avenue High School
- Elmont Memorial High School
- Garden City High School
- George W. Hewlett High School
- Jericho High School
- New Hyde Park Memorial High School
- Roslyn High School

C A

- Lawrence High School
- Plainedge High School
- Sewanhaka High School
- South Side High School
- Wantagh High School
- West Hempstead High School
- Westbury High School

C

- Bethpage High School
- Floral Park Memorial High School
- Glen Cove High School
- Great Neck North High School
- Island Trees High School
- Lynbrook Senior High School
- Valley Stream South High School

D A

- Locust Valley High School
- Manhasset High School
- Mineola High School
- North Shore High School
- Roosevelt High School
- Seaford High School
- Valley Stream North High School
- W T Clarke High School

D

- Carle Place High School
- Cold Spring Harbor High School
- East Rockaway High School
- Friends Academy
- Malverne High School
- Oyster Bay-East Norwich High School
- The Wheatley School

=== Section 9 ===
==== Overview ====
Location: Orange, Sullivan, Ulster Counties

==== Leagues ====
Class AA

- Kingston High School
- Middletown High School
- Monroe-Woodbury High School
- Newburgh Free Academy
- Pine Bush High School
- Valley Central High School

Class A

- Beacon High School
- Cornwall Central High School
- Franklin Delano Roosevelt High School
- Goshen Central High School
- Minisink Valley High School
- Monticello High School
- Our Lady of Lourdes High School
- Wallkill Senior High School
- Warwick Valley High School
- Washingtonville High School

Class B

- John S. Burke Catholic High School
- Liberty High School
- Marlboro High School
- New Paltz High School
- Port Jervis High School
- Red Hook High School
- Rondout Valley High School
- Saugerties High School

Class C

- Chester Academy
- Dover High School
- Highland High School
- James I. O’Neill High School
- Spackenkill High School

Class D

=== Section 10 ===
==== Overview ====
Location: St. Lawrence and Franklin Counties

=== Section 11 ===
==== Overview ====
Location: Suffolk County

== See also ==
- New York State Public High School Athletic Association Boys Basketball Championships
- Public Schools Athletic League
- New York state high school boys basketball championships
