= Jennifer Bernhard =

American electrical engineer

- Born: 1966 (age 59–60); Poland, Herkimer County, New York
- Spouse: Bill Bernhard

Academic background
- Education: BS, Electrical Engineering, 1988, Cornell University; MS, 1990, Ph.D. Electrical Engineering, 1994, Duke University
- Thesis: Waveguides and cavities with dielectric slab-loading that support uniform TEM modes (1994)
- Website: antennas.ece.illinois.edu

Jennifer Lyn Truman Bernhard (born 1966) is an American electrical engineer. She is the Department Head of Electrical and Computer Engineering at the University of Illinois Urbana-Champaign. In 2010, Bernhard was elected a Fellow of the Institute of Electrical and Electronics Engineers (IEEE) for her development of multifunctional, reconfigurable, and integrated antennas.

== Early life and education ==
Bernhard was born in 1966 and attended Poland Central School in Poland, Herkimer County, New York. After graduating in 1984, she enrolled at Cornell University for her undergraduate degree in electrical engineering. Following this, she earned her Master's degree and PhD at Duke University.

== Career ==
Upon completing her PhD, Bernhard remained at Duke for a nine-month post-doctoral position and was immediately hired as an assistant professor in the Electrical and Computer Engineering Department at the University of New Hampshire (UNH). She was the only woman among the 14 faculty members in the department. In 1998, she was honored for excellence for college teaching. Bernhard remained at UNH for three years before joining her husband at the University of Illinois Urbana-Champaign (U of I).

=== University of Illinois ===
Bernhard joined the faculty at U of I in 2000 and received a National Science Foundation CAREER Award for her project "Intelligent Portable Antenna Systems for High-Speed Wireless Communication." In 2003, Bernhard was promoted to the rank of associate professor on indefinite tenure in the Department of Electrical and Computer Engineering. In 2010, Bernhard was elected a Fellow of the Institute of Electrical and Electronics Engineers (IEEE) for her development of multifunctional, reconfigurable, and integrated antennas. Following this, she was selected to serve as editor for Artech House's Antennas and Propagation Series.

Bernhard oversaw the first demonstration of 3D printed antennas on curvilinear surfaces. Later that year, she co-developed a silver-inked rollerball pen capable of writing electrical circuits and interconnects on paper, wood, and other surfaces. In recognition of her academic achievements, Bernhard was named the Associate Dean for Research in the College of Engineering in 2012.

In 2016, Bernhard was awarded the Donald Biggar Willett Professorship of Engineering to continue her research into "applications-oriented electromagnetic problems with an emphasis on theoretical analysis and experimental investigation." She was later announced as one of the 2018-19 President's Executive Leadership Fellows and named as the interim director of the Applied Research Institute.

Bernhard was appointed Department Head of Electrical and Computer Engineering on August 13, 2024.

== Personal life ==
Bernhard and her husband Bill Bernhard have two children together.
