= Marathon High School =

Marathon High School may refer to:

- Marathon High School (New York)
- Marathon School (Texas) - See Marathon Independent School District
- Marathon High School (Wisconsin)
- Marathon High School (Florida)
