= Northeast College Preparatory School =

Location
- 940 Fernwood Park; Rochester, (Monroe County), New York 14609; United States
- Coordinates: 43.1800°N 77.5643°W

Information
- School type: Public school (government funded), combined middle and high school
- School district: Rochester City School District
- NCES District ID: 3624750
- CEEB code: 334841
- NCES School ID: 362475005856
- Principal: Breon "BB" Johnson
- Faculty: 35.17 (on an FTE basis)
- Grades: 7–12
- Gender: Coeducational
- Enrollment: 472 (2010-2011 school year)
- Student to teacher ratio: 13.42
- Campus: City: Midsize
- Mascot: Panther

Northeast College Preparatory School is a public high school located in Rochester, Monroe County, New York, U.S.A., and is one of eighteen high schools operated by the Rochester City School District. It shares the Douglass Campus with the Northwest College Preparatory School.

The Douglass Campus was formerly the Frederick Douglass Preparatory School before it was forced to be closed by the state due to poor performance. In September 2007, the Northeast and Northwest schools opened at the campus.
