= Charles O. Dickerson High School =

Location
- 100 Whig St; Trumansburg, New York 14886; United States; 42°32′12.14″N 76°39′29.14″W

Information
- Type: Public
- School district: Trumansburg Central School District
- NCES School ID: 362898003921
- Principal: Hilary Ewing
- Teaching staff: 32.50 (on an FTE basis)
- Grades: 9-12
- Enrollment: 282 (2023-2024)
- Student to teacher ratio: 8.68
- Campus: Rural
- Colors: Blue and Gold
- Mascot: Blue Raiders
- Yearbook: Tru-ce
- Website: www.tburgschools.org/page/high-school-home

Charles O. Dickerson High School is a public high school in Trumansburg, New York, United States. It is part of the Trumansburg Central School District, and has an enrollment of approximately 485 students. The principal is Megan Conaway.

Charles O. Dickerson High School is also commonly known as Trumansburg High School, or TCS (for Trumansburg Central School). Its sports mascot is the Blue Raider and the school's colors are Blue & Gold.

== 2014 Capital Project ==
The school recently underwent a capital project, in which several aspects of the school were remodeled and revamped, such as the water systems and roof. The most notable aspect of this undertaking was the creation of a new rubber outdoor track, which replaced an old, cracked asphalt track and rutted football field.

Unfortunately, the budget for the project did not extend to new outdoor bathrooms by the track; to build these, the sports boosters club has held fundraisers to gather the money and the building is being built almost entirely by volunteers. As of January 2017, they are not completed yet.

== See also ==
- List of high schools in New York (state)
