= Schuylerville High School =

High school in New York, United States

Location
- 14 Spring Street; Schuylerville, Saratoga County, New York 12871; United States
- Coordinates: 43.1060°N 73.5816°W

Information
- School type: Public high school
- NCES District ID: 3626160
- CEEB code: 335140
- NCES School ID: 362616003602
- Principal: Mark Brooks
- Teaching staff: 46.72 (FTE)
- Grades: 9–12
- Enrollment: 474 (2023–2024)
- Student to teacher ratio: 10.15
- Colors: Orange and black
- Nickname: Black Horses
- Website: https://www.schuylervilleschools.org/high-school/

Schuylerville High School is located in Schuylerville, New York. The school teams are known as the Black Horses. The school colors are orange and black. It is a high school serving grades K-12. Schuylerville is a member of the New York State Public High School Athletic Association (NYSPHSAA) and competes as a Class B school in Section II with a league affiliation in the Foothills Council.

Schuylerville encompasses parts of seven townships: Easton, Fort Edward, Greenwich, Northumberland, Saratoga, Stillwater and Wilton. It is in the Hudson Valley of upstate New York, 10 miles east of Saratoga Springs and 40 miles north of Albany. The area's first schools to the late 1700s and by the late 1800s there were 12 different districts within the town. New schools were continually built to accommodate a growing population. Schuylerville High School opened in 1926 at the corner of Spring Street and Broadway. It cost $225,000. General Stark's house was moved from the site to make way for the school. Additions were added in 1938 and 1947.

The Schuylerville Central School District was formed in 1946 and the Jr.-Sr. High School was constructed in 1955 followed by an elementary school in 1966. Additions, renovations and upgrades followed.

In 1990, a lawsuit arose between the Schuylerville school board and a local Jewish family, over the removal of a painting depicting the crucifixion of Christ from public display in the school auditorium. This lawsuit, which the school lost, was said to have prompted a visit to Schuylerville by a Ku Klux Klan member. At the same time, the Reverend Al Sharpton staged a counter-protest over the presence of the Klan.
