= Williamson Central School District =

School district in New York, United States

Address
- 4184 Miller Street Williamson, New York, 14589; United States
- Coordinates: 43°13′15″N 77°10′55″W

District information
- Type: Public
- Grades: PK–12
- Established: 1895; 131 years ago
- Superintendent: E. Bridget Ashton
- School board: Williamson Board of Education; Jamie Sonneville, President
- NCES District ID: 3631440

Students and staff
- Enrollment: 1,064 (2020-2021)
- Staff: 125 faculty 19 professional 59 paraprofessionals
- Student–teacher ratio: 11.20
- Athletic conference: New York State Public High School Athletic Association; Section V
- District mascot: Marauder
- Colors: Red and White

Other information
- Rival Schools: Marion Central School District; Sodus Central School District
- Athletic Teams: basketball, baseball, cheerleading, cross-country, golf, soccer, softball, tennis, track, volleyball, wrestling
- Website: www.williamsoncentral.org

The Williamson Central School District is a public school district that serves the residents of the Town of Williamson, New York, USA. It has three campuses: an elementary/primary school serving grades pre-kindergarten–4; a middle school for grades 5–8; and a senior high school comprising grades 9–12 (Williamson Senior High School). The system had 1,336 students in Kindergarten–12 and a senior class of 99 during the school year 2004/5. There were 125 teachers and 78 other professional and paraprofessional staff.

== Profile ==
=== Governance & administration ===
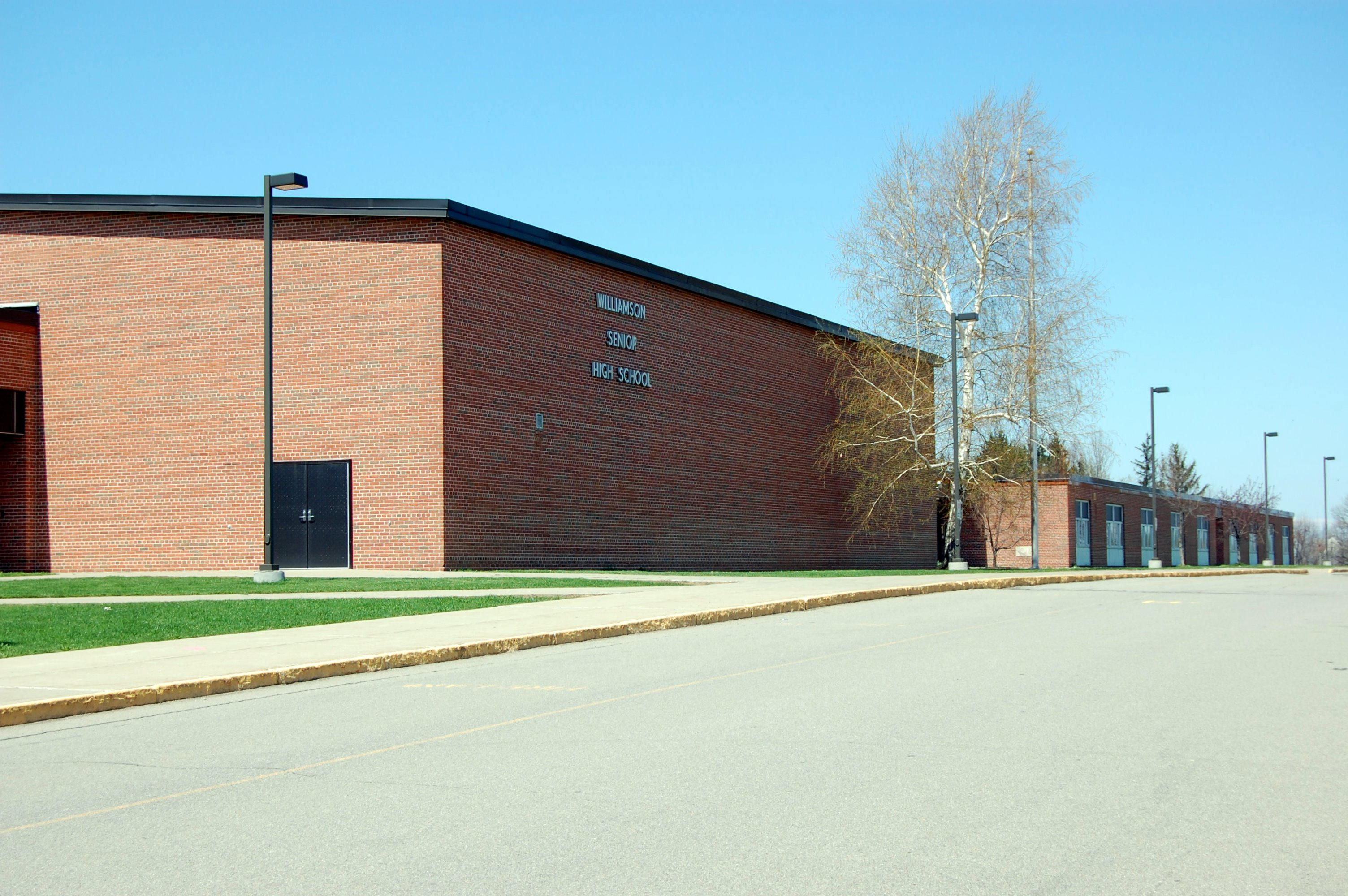
Williamson Senior High School 2007

The school system is governed by an elected board of education and administered by a school superintendent.

==== Board of education ====
The Board of Education consists of five members elected to three-year terms by voters living in the school district. The Board is generally responsible for:

- selection and evaluation of the district superintendent
- employment policies and compensation
- general scope and nature of curriculum, and textbook selection
- budget development/administration and other financial issues
- physical plant
- public/community relations
- pupil issues: entrance age, graduation requirements, health & safety issues, lunch services, discipline, and non-resident tuition

The Board also appoints certain staff positions: District Clerk, Clerk of the Board, School District Treasurer, Tax Collector, Independent Auditor, School Activities Treasurer, School Attorney, School Physician. The Board members for SY-2006/7 are: Linda Moll (president), Michael Collins (vice-president), William Herbert, Richard Jordan, and Patrick Wright.

==== Administration ====
The Superintendent of Schools is E. Bridget Ashton. The administrative team also includes an assistant superintendent, a business administrator and principals/assistant principals for each of the three school campuses. In school-year (SY) 2003/4 the district expended $11,604 per pupil. This is an increase of 21% from SY1999/2000 when it was $9,584 per pupil.

=== Academic performance & achievement ===
During SY-2004/5 Williamson offered 153 core classes of which 98% were taught by Highly Qualified Teachers. The district graduated 88 students, of which 74 (84%) attained Regents Diplomas. Eighty-two percent continued on to post-secondary education, 5% into the military, and 11% directly on to employment. Eighteen students (3.9%) did not graduate, either dropping out or entering the GED program.

==== Standardized & achievement testing ====
===== Regents exams =====
Like all New York State high schools, students at Williamson take the New York Regents Examinations. MAPS testing is also required for underclassmen, as well as pre- and post-assessments for the entire student body.

=== Demographics ===

As of the latest reporting (SY-2004/5) the racial/ethnic breakdown for district students is: 1.5% American Indian/Asian/Pacific Islander; 6.3% Black; 3.5% Hispanic; and 88.7% White (non-Hispanic).

==== Enrollment history ====
District enrollment has generally held steady in recent years.

Year	District	Elementary School	Middle School	High School
2006/7	1,336			
2005/6				
2004/5	1,336	464	428	444
2003/4	1,371	482	440	449
2002/3	1,373	499	435	439
2001/2	1,425	498	498	429
2000/1	1,406	503	458	445
1999/0	1,406	505	455	446
1998/9	1,372	503	445	434

== Competitive & artistic activities ==
=== Athletics ===
Williamson High School is a member of the New York State Public High School Athletic Association (NYSPHSAA) and is part of its Section V (Genesee Valley) area. Its size places it among the Association's Class B schools. The school sponsors teams in basketball, cheerleading, cross-country, golf, soccer, softball, tennis, track, volleyball, wrestling.

=== Creative & performing arts ===
The District has always enjoyed a strong music education and performance program, particularly in the band area. Both the middle and high schools traditionally stage musicals each year.

== Scholarships (post-graduation) ==
Williamson Central offers a broad range of scholarship opportunities to graduating seniors. Some of the scholarships honor notable educators and other members of the community: Lee & Berneice Lawrence Rotary Scholarship (elementary teacher); Dr. Ludwig L. Bergner Memorial (prominent physician); Josephine Catchpole (educator); Charles J. Dittmar (attorney); Theodore E. Piddock Science Award (science teacher); James Todd Art Award (art, speech and drama teacher); Frank C. Van Vleet Award (educator); Jeannette Steinbeck Award (social studies teacher); Carl Cook Memorial Scholarship (athletics coach and physical education teacher); Richard V. Milks Memorial (teacher); and Robert DeVoogt Scholarship Award (athletics coach and physical education teacher).

== History ==
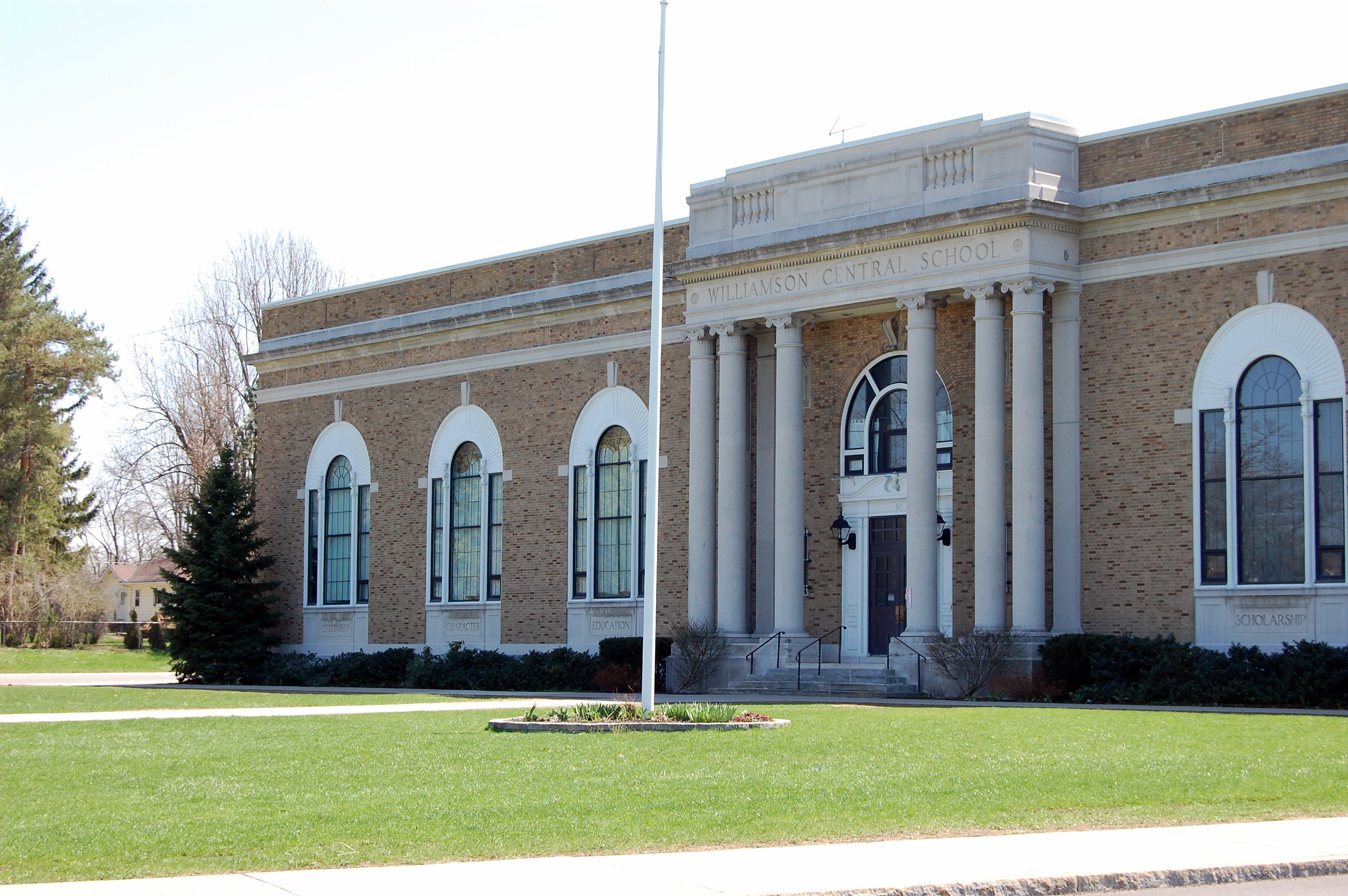
Williamson Middle School 2007

The development of public education in Williamson paralleled that of the growth of schools in other parts of New York State. In contrast to other states, such as Virginia, most school systems in New York are town-centric, rather than county-centric (the exceptions being districts serving large metropolitan areas). In the late 18th and early 19th centuries, "one-room schools" sprang up across New York, often many to a town since attendance was determined by how far a child could walk. By the middle of the 19th century, there were over 10,000 of these "Common Districts" in the State and the multiple Districts in each town combined resources to support a town high school to serve the needs of older students and a growing focus on post-secondary education and other opportunities.

It was at this time (1854) that the state authorized one or more common districts to form a "union free school district", thus formalizing the structure that is in place today. This law permitted the new districts to establish "academic departments," or high schools, which were to be overseen by both the Regents and the Superintendent of Public Instruction. Boards of education managed the property and finances of the city and union free districts, and hired superintendents to administer systems with several schools. Most of the union free districts later became the cores of central school districts.

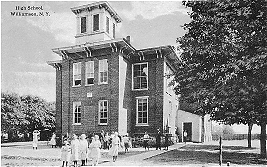
Williamson Union School in 1908 Maple & Miller Streets

Williamson's first school was formed in Pultneyville in 1806, just 12 years after the first white settler arrived and four years after the town was formed from neighboring Sodus. This became District Number One when a second school was opened in 1811 in the Village of Williamson four miles to the south. Williamson eventually had 13 such districts and did not "centralize" until 1930, placing them into a single administrative unit with the exceptions of the districts in Pultneyville, East Williamson and Benton (these villages/hamlets decided to maintain their own schools). By 1948, however, all school districts in the town were consolidated under the Williamson Central Schools name.

In 1931, WCS held its commencement exercises for its senior class in its newly constructed classroom building, which replaced a school that had served, initially District 2 and then the central district, since 1876. It was located at Maple and Miller Streets and now serves as the system's middle school. When it opened in the fall of 1931 it had 600 students, 32 teachers and five buses. By 1954 the ranks of the students had swelled to 1,000 and the number of faculty was 51. This necessitated expansion and in 1956 a primary school was opened on land to the south-east of the high school campus; it served students in grades kindergarten through third.

The final growth spurt of the school system came during the 1960s as the town population grew. Much of this growth occurred as Williamson's demographic character changed from primarily agricultural to that of a bedroom community for neighboring Monroe County, New York to the west. As employment with companies such as Eastman Kodak and Xerox grew, so did the population of Williamson. Consequently, the need for a high school was recognized and initially it appeared that Williamson would open a combined facility with the Marion district just to the south. Sentiment was so strong against this move, however, and Williamson residents were able to secure their own senior high school, which opened on October 13, 1969. Ironically, the subsequent Marion Senior High School is located only three miles from Williamson's.

=== Timeline ===
1802 - The Town of Williamson is founded from land split from the Town of Sodus.

1808 - The first school in Williamson is built in Pultneyville, a one-room building with Mr. Morrison as the teacher.

1811 - Pultneyville becomes District One when a second school house is built in the Village of Williamson on East Main Street (Williamson becomes District Two); Mr. John Lambert is the teacher. The structure burns down at some point, but is immediately replaced by another that serves District Two until the mid-1850s (when it, too, burns down).

1850 - District Number Eleven opens in "Koetsville", at the north-east corner of Shepard and Stoney Lonesome Roads.

1853 - A state law authorized one or more common districts to form a "union free school district". This law permitted the new districts to establish "academic departments," or high schools.

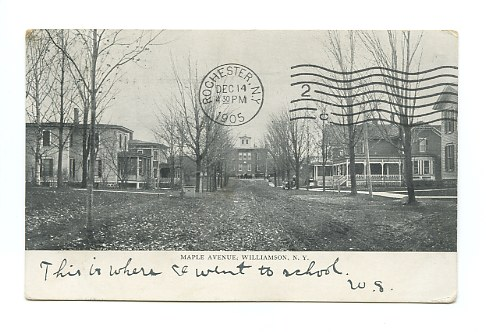
Williamson Union School in 1905 As viewed along Maple Avenue (postcard)

1855 - A Cobblestone school building is constructed for District Two, located on the corner of East Main and present-day Locust Street

1876 - District Two is enlarged and a new, larger school building is built on Miller Street, on what is now the front lawn of the Middle School. D.D. Warne is the principal of this two-story structure, which has two classrooms on the first floor and the town's first auditorium on the second. Maple Avenue is created to provide access to the school. While the school serves primarily District Two children, children from some of the other 12 districts in Williamson attend as well (thanks to tuition paid by their respective districts).

1895 - The Williamson Union School is registered by the State of New York

1902 - The "academic department" of Williamson Union School is registered as a New York State High School.

1907 - The school is enlarged, doubling its size.

1914 - 1918 - Formation of central rural school districts was first authorized by a 1914 law. In 1917 the Legislature abolished all the thousands of common school districts and formed them into "township units." Across the state, school taxes shot up, taxpayers protested, and a year later the township system was abandoned.

1922 - District 2 overcrowding prompts additional space for teaching grades 1 – 5 to be rented in the Grange Hall.

1924 - Portable classroom building rented and placed on present-day Middle School tennis courts location.

1930 - On April 25 Williamson voters decide to “Centralize” its school system, creating Williamson Central School from 8 of the town’s 13 Districts (Pultneyville, East Williamson and Benton are opposed to centralization and decide to maintain their own District schools).

1931 - In June the WCS Class of 1931 holds its commencement exercises in the newly completed school building (built at a cost of $375,000). The new school is dedicated on September 27 and officially opened. It has 600 students, a staff of 32 teachers and five buses.

1937 - The "Little Red School House," a 50-year-old structure on Townline Road—"after a storm of protests"— is saved from closing despite serving only one student, six-year-old Miriam Cole. The following September, she is joined by a family of four other children who move into the district from Pennsylvania; the other 21 children in the district either are pre-school age or attend Williamson Central School.

1941 - Enrollment drops from 650 to 607 almost overnight due to World War II enlistments.

1947 - After four to five years of declining enrollment due to WWII enlistments, the student population sharply increases due to resumption of interrupted educations and the dissolution of the East Williamson District.

1948 - The Benton District dissolves as well, further swelling the student body.

1949 - Board of Education purchases land to the south-east of the school for future expansion.

1950 - Enrollment increases to 850. New wing added to school building comprising 6 classrooms and a cafeteria.

1954 - School District has over 1,000 students and a faculty of 51.

1956 - Primary school for grades K – 3 constructed on land purchased in 1949. Board of Cooperative Educational Services (BOCES) created.

1964 - The need for further expansion is recognized, but plans for a new high school building are complicated by the state’s “Master Plan” for education requirements that would mandate Williamson to combine with Marion.

1966 - Disregarding its own Master Plan, New York State approves financial aid for a Williamson-only high school. Construction begins.

1969 - The Williamson Senior High School is officially opened on October 13.

1970 - Student enrollment reaches 1,792.

=== Past administrators ===
Year	Superintendent	Elementary School Principal 1956 – 2017	Middle School Principal 1895 – 2017	High School Principal 1969 – 2017
1876/77		D.D. Warne		
1955/56		Frank Van Vleet (acting)		
1956/57		Dana Wilbur		Frank Van Vleet
1962/63		Richard W. Ferrell		
1963/64			Robert Horr	
1969/70				Robert Horr
1970/71				Robert Horr
1971/72				Robert Horr
1972/73				Robert Horr
1973/74				Robert Horr
1974/75				Robert Horr
1975/76				Robert Horr
1976/77				Robert Horr
1977/78				Robert Horr
1978/79				Robert Horr
1979/80				Robert Horr
1980/81	Dana Wilber			Robert Horr
1981/82		Carl Kieper	Mr. DeHond	Robert Horr
1982/83				Robert Horr
1984/85	Gary J. Buehler			Charles Monsees
1985/86	Gary J. Buehler			Charles Monsees
1986/87	Gary J. Buehler			Charles Monsees
1987/88	Gary J. Buehler			Charles Monsees
1988/89	Gary J. Buehler			Charles Monsees
1998/99		Anne Ressler	Patrick Wright	Daniel Starr
1999/00		Anne Ressler	Patrick Wright	Daniel Starr
2000/01	H. Barry Spink	Anne Ressler	Patrick Wright	Daniel Starr
2001/02	Maria Ehresman	Anne Ressler	Russell Kissinger	Daniel Starr
2002/03	Maria Ehresman	Anne Ressler	Russell Kissinger	Daniel Starr
2003/04	Maria Ehresman	Anne Ressler	John E. Fulmer	Douglas Lauf
2004/05	Maria Ehresman	Anne Ressler	John E. Fulmer	Douglas Lauf
2005/06	Maria Ehresman	Anne Ressler	John E. Fulmer	Douglas Lauf
2006/07	Maria Ehresman	Anne Ressler	John E. Fulmer	Douglas Lauf
2007/08		Anne Ressler	John E. Fulmer	
2008/09		Anne Ressler	John E. Fulmer	
2009/10		Anne Ressler	John E. Fulmer	
2010/11		Ellen Saxby	John E. Fulmer	
2011/12		Ellen Saxby	John E. Fulmer	
2012/13		Ellen Saxby	John E. Fulmer	
2013/14		Ellen Saxby	John E. Fulmer	
2014/15		Ellen Saxby	John E. Fulmer	
2015/16		Ellen Saxby	John E. Fulmer	
2016/17		Ellen Saxby	John E. Fulmer	

== References & sources ==
=== Sources ===
- Guide to the Reorganization of School Districts in New York State. New York State Education Department. Last accessed December 10, 2006.
- L. Hoffman (April 21, 2002). "Koetsville: The Epicenter of a Community (Williamson, One-Room Schoolhouse, Dist. 11)" (PDF). www.co.wayne.ny.us. Archived from the original (PDF) on January 17, 2006.
- J. VanDeusen (1965). "Education in Williamson". www.co.wayne.ny.us.
