= Lancaster County Christian School =

School in Lancaster, Pennsylvania, United States

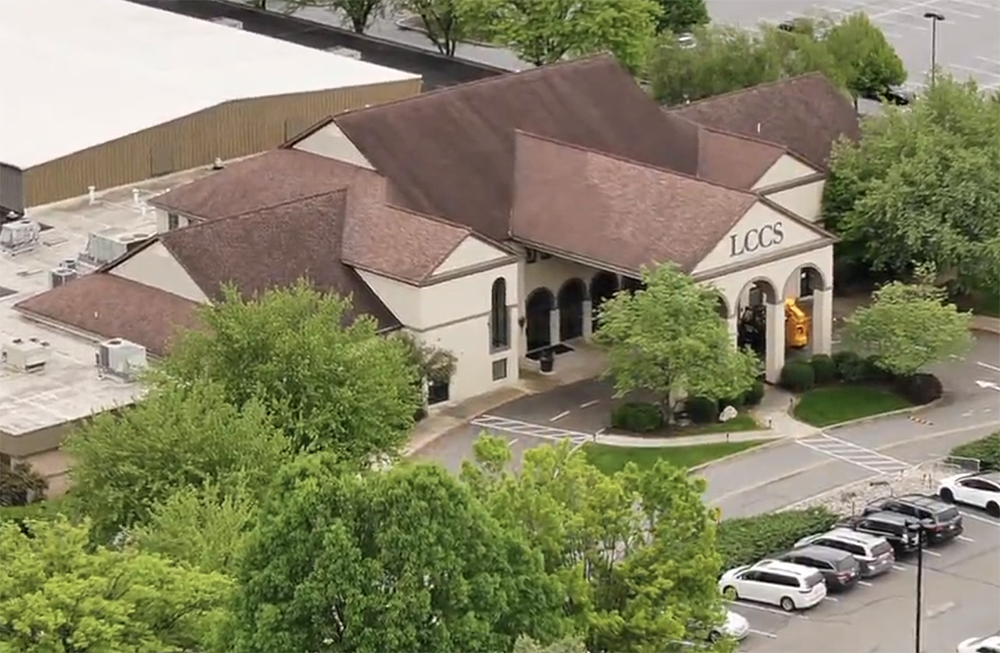

Location
- 2390 New Holland Pike; 2390 New Holland Pike, Lancaster, PA, USA; Lancaster, Lancaster County, Pennsylvania 17601; United States
- 40°4′58″N 76°13′38″W

Information
- Type: Private, coeducational
- Religious affiliation: Christianity
- Founded: 2010
- Administrator: Nate Long
- Early Childhood & Lower School Principal: Elijah Platchek
- Grades: Preschool - 12th grade
- Enrollment: 522 students
- Colors: Navy blue, orange, and Carolina blue
- Athletics: Yes
- Athletics conference: Commonwealth Christian Athletic Conference Pennsylvania Interscholastic Athletic Association
- Sports: Boys: soccer, basketball, baseball, golf, track & field; Girls: soccer, basketball, golf, track & field, volleyball
- Mascot: Lion
- Team name: Lions
- Accreditation: Association of Christian Schools International Middle States Association of Colleges and Schools; Mid-Atlantic Christian Schools Association; National Association of University-Model Schools Cognia (education)
- Affiliation: Education Records Bureau College Board; Christian School Management Independent School Management
- Website: lccs.cc

Lancaster County Christian School (LCCS) is a private, non-denominational Christian school offering preschool-12th grade transformational education to families in Lancaster County, Pennsylvania, United States. It exists to glorify God as a community of faith and learning dedicated to forming disciples of Jesus Christ. This mission is expressed concretely through four core values of faith, scholarship, virtue, and community.

Lancaster County Christian School is owned and governed by a board of directors using Policy Governance. The board of directors is composed of parents, alumni, and alumni parents. Management of the school is handled by the head of school and administrative team.

The centrality of Christ provides the framework for the educational process at Lancaster County Christian School. All subjects are viewed through the lens of Scripture because all truth is God's truth. This learning platform leads to a broad understanding of God's purposes and enables students to properly integrate knowledge and conduct.

Lancaster County Christian School welcomes families from diverse evangelical backgrounds and does not promote denominational distinctives. School families represent nearly 100 evangelical churches throughout the area.

== History ==
LCCS has an abundant history steeped in strong foundations that were built on the Word of God. Its values and heritage were established long ago as Lancaster Christian School (founded in 1954) and Living Word Academy (founded in 1981). These two cornerstone schools merged in 2010 to become Lancaster County Christian School. LCCS has continued this God-honoring, Christian education with more than 90 combined years of bountiful heritage.

== Athletics ==
LCCS provides a high-quality athletic program that provides student-athletes every opportunity to reach their potential in the sports arena and as individuals. We expect players to work to the limits of their ability to attain high skill levels, agility and mental understanding of the game, as well as maintain Godly character in every situation. They offer team sports in soccer, basketball, volleyball, track & field, baseball, and golf. In 2015, the boy's varsity baseball team won the Class A State Championship, defeating Eisenhower (Russell, PA), 8-0.
