= Mount Morris Junior/Senior High School =

Location
- 30 Bonadonna Ave; Mount Morris, New York 14510; United States
- Coordinates: 42.7129°N 77.8745°W

Information
- Type: Public
- School district: Mount Morris Central School District
- Superintendent: Greg Bump
- NCES School ID: 362001004344
- Principal: Jesse Hamilton
- Teaching staff: 31.05 (on an FTE basis)
- Grades: 7-12
- Gender: Co-ed
- Enrollment: 219 (2023-2024)
- Student to teacher ratio: 7.05
- Campus: Rural: Distant
- Color(s): Navy Blue and White
- Mascot: Blue Devils
- Yearbook: The Heights
- Website: www.mtmorriscsd.org

Mount Morris Junior/Senior High School is a public high school located in Mount Morris, Livingston County, New York, U.S.A., and is the only high school operated by the Mount Morris Central School District.
