= Alisa M. Flatow Yeshiva High School =

Coordinates: 41.111475°N 74.129088°W

Bat Torah – The Alisa M. Flatow Yeshiva High School

Information
- Type: Private
- Religious affiliation: Jewish
- Established: 1978
- Status: Closed
- Principal: Miriam S. Bak
- Faculty: 14.1 (on FTE basis)
- Grades: 9 to 12
- Gender: Girls
- Enrollment: 77 (2005-06)
- Student to teacher ratio: 5.5
- Affiliations: National Society of Hebrew Day Schools
- Also called: Bas Torah; Bat Torah Academy
- Website: www.battorah.org

Bat Torah - The Alisa M. Flatow Yeshiva High School was a private Jewish day school located in Suffern, New York. In May 2011, the school had planned to move to the Teaneck Jewish Center. On July 25, 2011, it was reported that the school would not be opening for the 2011–2012 academic year. Mrs. Miriam Bak, the principal, cited an unexpected drop in 11th grade enrollment and higher-than-expected moving costs as the reasons for closing.

Bas Torah, as it was originally called, opened in 1978. Miriam Bak became head of the school in 1981 and renamed the school to Bat Torah Academy. In 2000, The school was renamed to Bat Torah - The Alisa M. Flatow Yeshiva High School after Alisa Flatow, a New Jersey student killed in the Egged bus 36 bombing in 1995.
