= Averill Park =

Urban park in San Pedro, Los Angeles, California

- Interactive map of Averill Park
- Type: Urban park
- Location: San Pedro, Los Angeles (Los Angeles City Council District 15)
- Nearest city: Los Angeles, California
- Coordinates: 33°43′57″N 118°18′38″W
- Operator: Los Angeles County Department of Parks and Recreation
- Status: Open

Averill Park is an urban park located in San Pedro, Los Angeles, California. It features barbecue pits, a gazebo and an artificial pond with a waterfall. There are numerous resident ducks, turtles, bees and various bird species. The land for the 10.55-acre (4.27 ha) park was donated by Averill-Weymouth Co. in 1920. The park was dedicated March 4, 1921. Playground equipment was installment in 1997. Averill Park sometimes refers to the neighborhood surrounding the park proper.
