= Woodstock Day School =

Location
- 1430 Glasco Turnpike; Saugerties, New York; United States; 42.0501°N 74.0589°W

Information
- Type: Private
- Established: 1973
- Faculty: 22* (on FTE basis)
- Grades: Nursery School to 12 grade
- Enrollment: 126* (2007–08)
- Student to teacher ratio: 5.7:1*
- Colors: blue & White
- Mascot: Wolf
- Nickname: WDS
- Team name: Woodstock Wolves
- Website: www.woodstockdayschool.org

Woodstock Day School is an independent co-educational school serving students from nursery to high school in Saugerties, New York, United States. It is about 3 1/2 miles east to the town of Woodstock.
