= Westbrook Preparatory School =

Special school in New York, United States

Coordinates: 40.857506°N 73.618395°W

Westbrook Preparatory School was New York State's first co-ed private residential school for 24 middle and high school students with high-functioning autism. It was established after intense lobbying by parents, with the aim of bringing special education students back from out-of-state private schools, through creating publicly financed alternatives closer to home. The school was originally scheduled to open in late fall 2010 and eventually opened in February 2011.

== Academics ==
Westbrook Preparatory School offered an eight-hour school day that provides a state Regents course load and was taught by New York State Certified teachers and teacher's assistants. In addition to courses required for graduation as well as a focus on the arts, students were supposed to have a structured evening that would include homework, meal preparation and chores.

== Disagreement regarding location ==
Officials at SCO (a social services organization) have proposed placing the school in a residential neighborhood which residents have objected. Some of the arguments made on the behalf of the residents were the close proximity of the school to the young children of other schools nearby. They held false stereotypes, assuming that "some autistic people can easily become violent, aggressive and defiant."

The school eventually closed in late 2023 after its staff led to a near-death of a young teen who was told to take a bottle of pills. Staff appears to have not called an ambulance for the teen, but rather drove them to several clinics before driving them to a hospital. Parents of all students were notified in late September 2023 that the school was closing. No reasons were provided for students/families. The school was permanently closed around December 2023. The parent company of Westbrook School is SCO Family of Services.
