= South Seneca School District =

School district in the U.S. state of New York

Coordinates: 42.6723°N 76.8214°W

South Seneca Central Schools
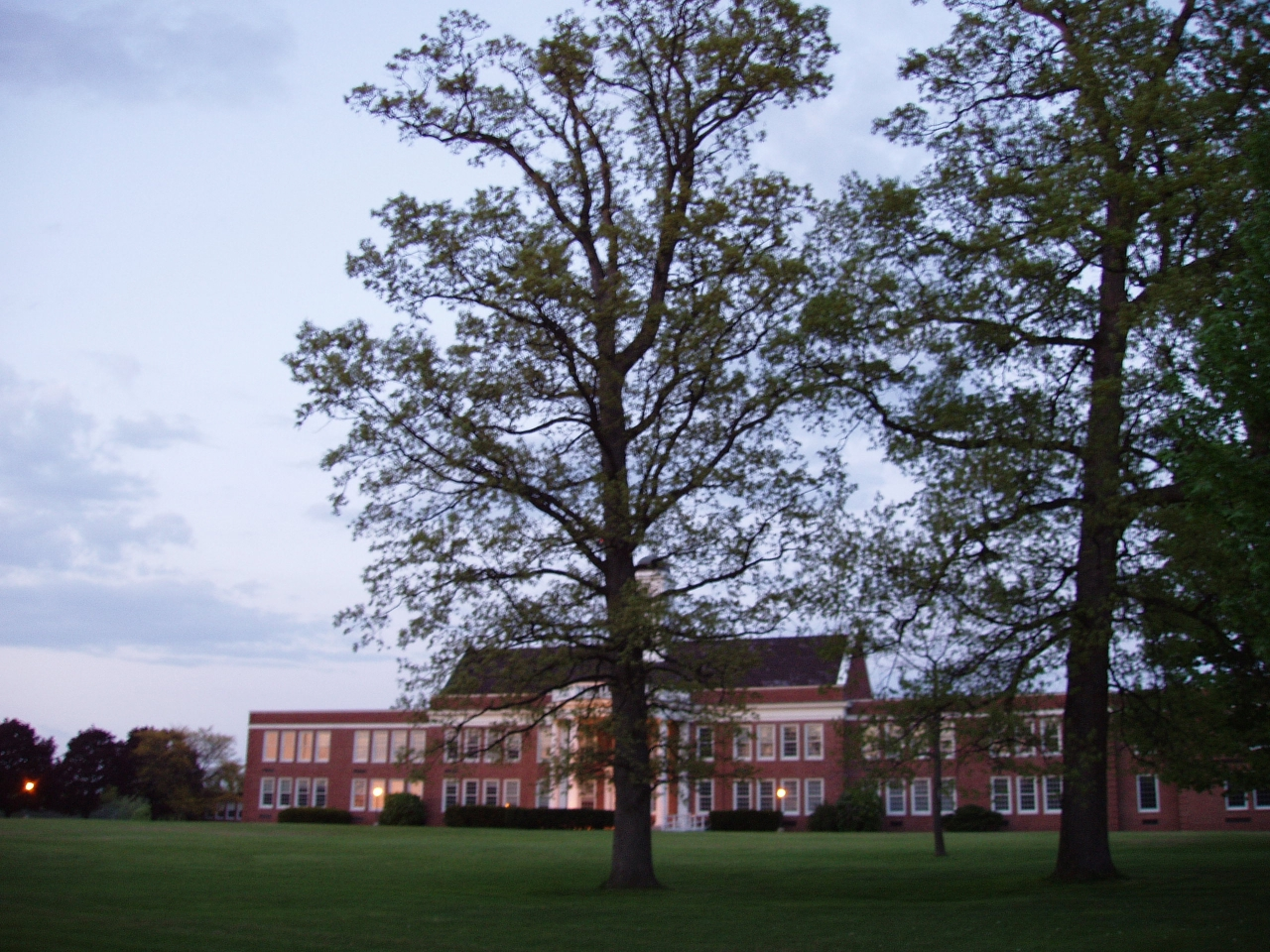

Location
- Ovid, Seneca County, New York; United States

District information
- Type: Public

Students and staff
- District mascot: Falcon
- Colors: Black and Gold

Other information
- Website: www.southseneca.org

South Seneca Central Schools provide primary and secondary education for the towns of Ovid, Interlaken and Lodi in New York. In 1969 the new district was created by consolidating the Interlaken and Ovid school districts. The former Interlaken school now serves as the district's elementary school. The middle and high schools are located at the Ovid campus.

South Seneca is part of the Tompkins-Seneca-Tioga (TST) BOCES district.

South Seneca is also part of Section 5 sports and is part of the Wayne-Fingerlakes League.

The superintendent is Stephen Parker Zielinski.

The current enrollment (2016–17) is 672 students. According to the 2009-2010 New York State report card, the average class size is 19 students. 46 percent of student qualify for free or reduced lunch. The student population is 96 percent white, 2 percent black, and 2 percent Latino. There are 87 teachers in the district, 25 percent of whom have a master's degree plus 30 hours or a doctorate. The report card document is downloadable from the NY State Education Department.
