= Weedsport Junior/Senior High School =

Location
- 2821 E Brutus St; Weedsport, New York 13166; United States; 43.0492°N 76.5536°W

Information
- Type: Public
- Established: 1957
- School district: Weedsport Central School District
- Superintendent: Shawn O'Connor
- NCES School ID: 363042004095
- Principal: Brett Fingland
- Teaching staff: 39.61 (on an FTE basis)
- Grades: 6-12
- Enrollment: 391 (2021-2022)
- Student to teacher ratio: 9.87
- Campus: Rural: Fringe
- Colors: Green and White
- Sports: 15 varsity sports
- Mascot: Wolverines
- Newspaper: The Johnny Green
- Yearbook: Sparks
- Website: www.weedsport.org/weedsport-jr-sr-high-school/

Weedsport Junior/Senior High School is a public, secondary school located in Weedsport, New York, Cayuga County. The facility was constructed in 1957 and then expanded in 1967 to include a new cafeteria, swimming pool, and additional classrooms.

== Student body ==
Approximately 96% of the student population is white/non-Hispanic, with 1% Asian, 1% Black/non-Hispanic, <1% Hispanic, and <1% American Indian.

== Faculty and staff ==
In the Weedsport Central School District, the student-teacher ratio is 13:1. 78% of the teachers in the school district hold a Master's degree and 22% hold a Bachelor's degree. The average teaching experience is 15 years.

== Academic performance ==
During the 2004-05 school year, student attendance was 96%, which was 3% higher than the New York State average for that school year.

The proportion of Weedsport High School students who pass New York State Regents Exams is generally higher than the statewide averages. In 2005, the following percentage of students passed the given regents exams (New York state averages are listed in parentheses):

- Mathematics A - 93% (78%)
- Mathematics B - 64% (66%)
- English - 98% (77%)
- Living Environment - 95% (76%)
- Physics - 88% (81%)
- Chemistry - 84% (72%)
- Earth Science - 72% (72%)

== Athletics ==
Weedsport is known for having a prestigious athletic program, especially their football program. The Weedsport Varsity Football team won the 2004 New York State Class D Championship 22-21 over Tuckahoe. Their main athletic rival is Port Byron.

== The Johnny Green ==
The Johnny Green is the student newspaper. Named in honor of legendary coach John Skvorak, The Johnny Green moved to an online format in Fall 2012.
