= Northwest College Preparatory School =

Coordinates: 43°10′47.25″N 77°33′50.11″W

Northwest College Preparatory High School

Location
- 940 Fernwood Park Rochester, New York 14609; Rochester, New York; USA

Information
- Type: Public middle school and high school
- Established: 2006
- School district: Rochester City School District
- Principal: Rodney Moore
- Grades: 7-12
- Enrollment: 346
- Campus: urban
- Color(s): Navy and Gold
- Website: www.rcsdk12.org/nw

Northwest College Preparatory High School, sometimes referred to as Northwest or just NWCP, is a public high school in Rochester, New York. It is in the Rochester City School District.

== History ==
In September 2007 the Northwest College Preparatory High School moved to the Frederick Douglass Campus.

== Sports ==
Northwest College Prep shares its athletic teams with the Northeast College Preparatory High School making the teams that are housed on the Douglass Campus. Several of the Varsity Teams are combined with the Franklin Campus. The name of their sports team is the College Prep Panthers.

== See also ==
- Rochester City School District
