= Andover Central School =

Andover School

Location
- 31-35 Elm Street; Andover, (Allegany County), New York 14806; United States
- Coordinates: 42.1591°N 77.7915°W

Information
- School type: Public school (government funded), combined elementary, middle and high school with Pre-kindergarten
- School district: Andover Central School District
- NCES District ID: 3603030
- Superintendent: Jennifer Joyce
- CEEB code: 330185
- NCES School ID: 360303000077
- Principal: Molly Turner
- Faculty: 32.00 (on an FTE basis)
- Grades: PK–12
- Gender: Coeducational
- Enrollment: 255 (2023-2024)
- Student to teacher ratio: 7.97
- Campus: Rural: Distant
- Colors: Purple and White
- Mascot: Panthers

Andover School is a public combined elementary, middle and high school with Pre-kindergarten located in Andover, Allegany County, New York, U.S.A., and is the only school operated by the Andover Central School District.
