= Indian River Central High School =

Indian River High School

Location
- 32925 US Route 11; Philadelphia, New York 13673
- Coordinates: 44.1436°N 75.7137°W

Information
- Type: Public Secondary
- Principal: Morgan Pratt Neaves
- Teaching staff: 75.41 (FTE)
- Grades: 9–12
- Enrollment: 795 (2023-2024)
- Student to teacher ratio: 10.54
- Campus: Rural
- Colors: Navy Blue, Columbia Blue and White
- Nickname: Wolves
- Rival: Carthage Central School
- Website: ircsd.org

Indian River High School is a high school in the Indian River Central School District in Philadelphia, New York. The High School opened in 1959 as a grade 7–12 facility; currently it serves grades 9–12. The school's students live in several towns and villages located in northern Jefferson County, New York.
