= Sackets Harbor Central School District =

School in Sackets Harbor, New York, United States

Address
- 215 South Broad Street Sackets Harbor, New York, 13685; United States
- Coordinates: 43.943905°N 76.121237°W

District information
- Grades: K-12
- Superintendent: Jennifer L. Gaffney
- Chair of the board: Dale Phillips

Students and staff
- District mascot: Patriot
- Colors: Maroon and White

Other information
- Website: www.sacketspatriots.org

Sackets Harbor Central School District is an elementary and secondary school district located in Sackets Harbor, New York. It is a small, single-building preschool-12 school of approximately 475 students.
