= Immaculate Heart Central High School (Watertown, New York) =

Immaculate Heart Central Junior/Senior High School
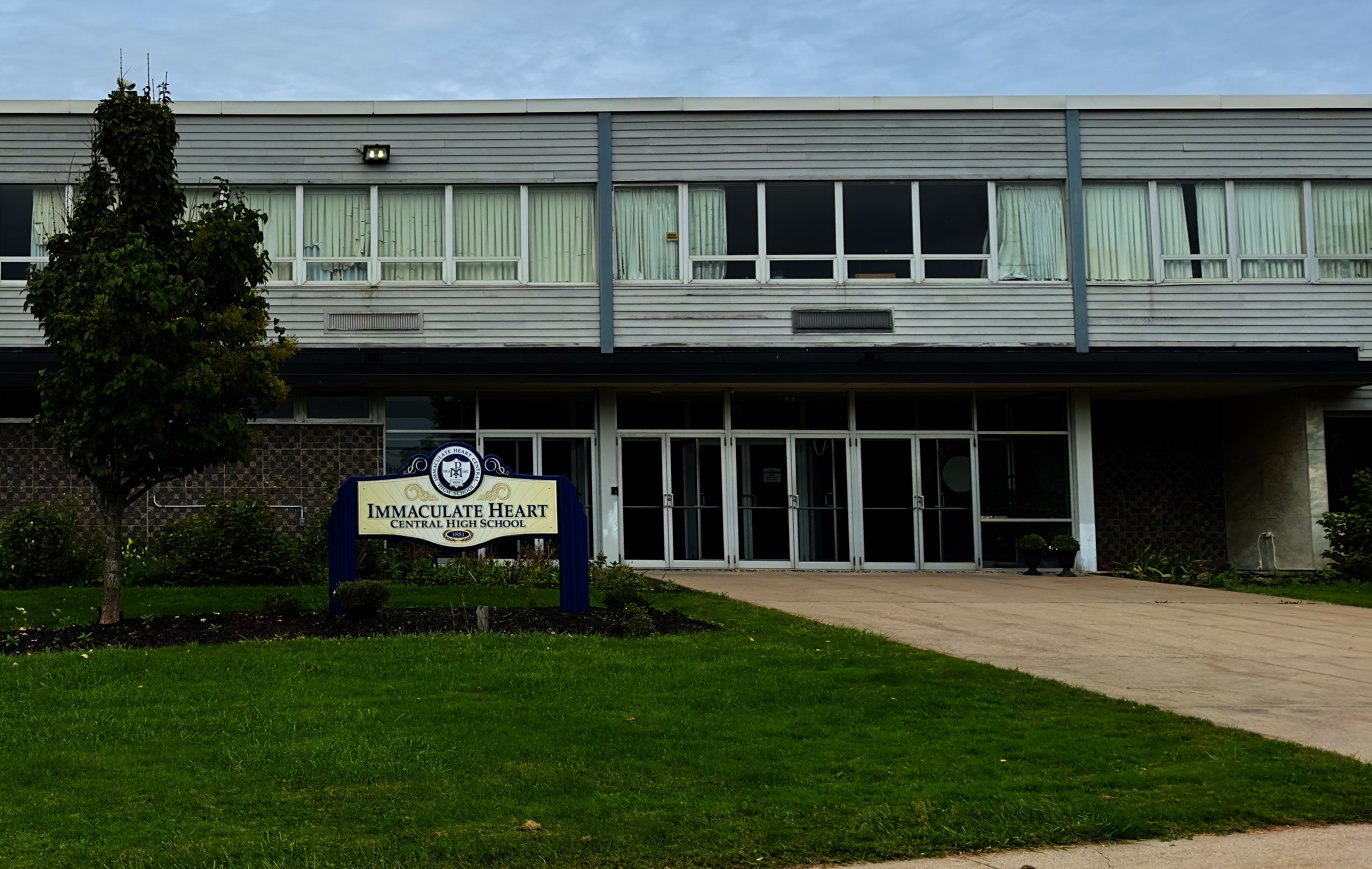

Location
- 1316 Ives Street; Watertown, (Jefferson County), New York 13601; United States; 43°57′32″N 75°56′0″W

Information
- Type: Private, Coeducational
- Religious affiliations: Roman Catholic; Sisters of St. Joseph
- Established: 1881
- Dean: John Montondo
- Principal: Daniel Charlebois
- Grades: 6-12
- Average class size: 13
- Colors: Royal Blue and White
- Team name: Cavaliers
- Accreditation: Middle States Association of Colleges and Schools
- Tuition: $3,800/$5,250 (2009-2010)
- Website: www.ihcschool.org

Immaculate Heart Central High School is a private, Roman Catholic high school in Watertown, New York. It is located within the Roman Catholic Diocese of Ogdensburg.

== Background ==
Immaculate Heart was established in 1881 by the Sisters of St. Joseph as Immaculate Heart Academy, a co-educational private prep academy. The original campus was located at 362 West Main Street in Watertown, New York. The current location is on 1316 Ives St in Watertown, NY. IHC has a well documented reputation in Upstate New York concerning academics. IHC has dominated other schools in the local area concerning academics, as it has out performed, and maintained a higher average on standardized tests than any other local district. To continue their reputable education standards, 65% of IHC graduates earn a New York State Regents Diploma with Advanced Designation or Advanced Designation with Honors, and an impressive 100% Graduation and College Matriculation rate. IHC serves about 500 students in the Jefferson County and Fort Drum area. With such close proximity to Fort Drum, about 30% of students that attend IHC are active duty military affiliated.
