= Cuba-Rushford High School =

High school in Cuba, New York, United States

Location
- 5476 State Route 305 North; Cuba, (Allegany County), New York 14727; United States; 42.2367°N 78.2703°W

Information
- School type: Public school (government funded), high school
- School district: Cuba-Rushford Central School District
- NCES District ID: 3632010
- Superintendent: Carlos Gildemeister
- CEEB code: 331560
- NCES School ID: 363201000050
- Principal: Katie Ralston, Christopher Fee
- Teaching staff: 27.61 (on an FTE basis)
- Grades: 9–12
- Gender: Coeducational
- Enrollment: 206 (2023-2024)
- Student to teacher ratio: 7.46
- Campus: Rural: Distant
- Colors: Cranberry, Royal Blue and Silver
- Mascot: The Rebel

Cuba-Rushford High School is a public high school located in Cuba, Allegany County, New York, United States, and is the only high school operated by the Cuba-Rushford Central School District.
