= York Middle/High School =

Location
- 2578 Genesee St; Retsof, New York 14533; United States; 42.8301°N 77.8934°W

Information
- Type: Public
- Established: 1938
- School district: York Central School District
- Superintendent: Jesse Hamilton
- NCES School ID: 363195004279
- Principal: Charles Passarell
- Teaching staff: 51.88 (on an FTE basis)
- Grades: 6-12
- Gender: Co-ed
- Enrollment: 381 (2021-2022)
- Student to teacher ratio: 7.34
- Campus: Rural: Distant
- Colors: Purple and Gold
- Mascot: Golden Knight
- Yearbook: Shaft
- Website: mshs.yorkcsd.org/o/ymhs

York Middle/High School is a public high school located in the Hamlet of Retsof, Livingston County, New York, United States, and is the only high school operated by the York Central School District. The York Central School District recently hired two new administrators, Middle/high school Principal Charles Passarell in September 2025, and Superintendent Jesse Hamilton in July 2026.
