= Fillmore Central School =

School district in New York, United States

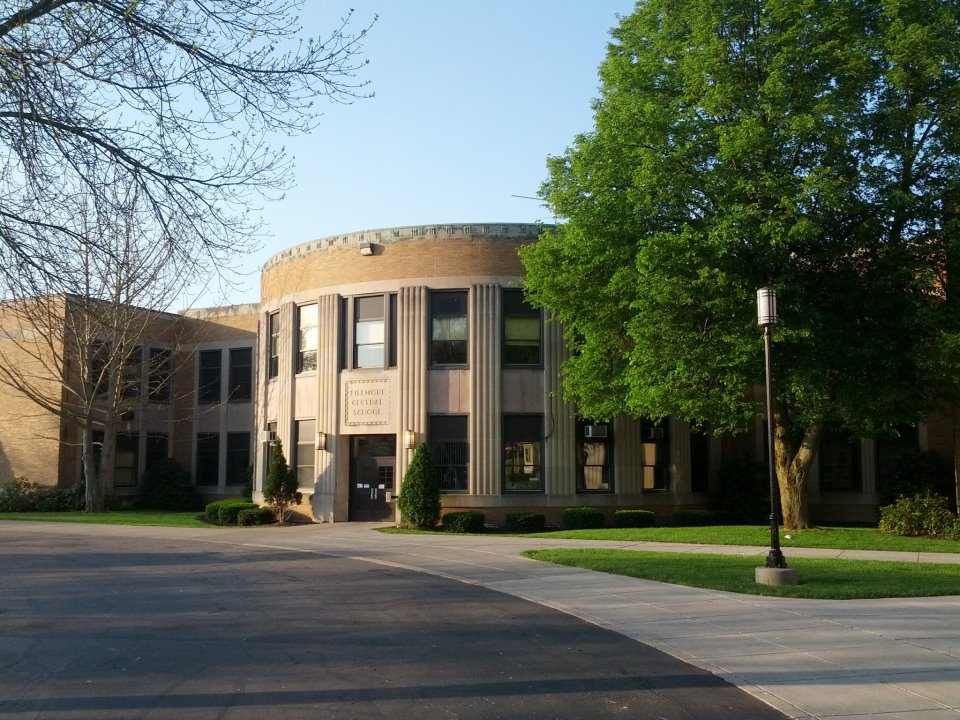

Location
- 104 Main St; Fillmore, (Allegany County), New York 14735; United States; 42.4655°N 78.1187°W

Information
- School type: Public school (government funded), combined elementary, middle and high school with Pre-kindergarten
- Motto: "Enter to Learn, Go Forth To Serve"
- School district: Fillmore Central School District
- NCES District ID: 3611070
- Superintendent: Michael Dodge
- CEEB code: 331900
- NCES School ID: 361107004552
- Principal: Eric Talbot
- Faculty: 57.03 (on an FTE basis)
- Grades: PK–12; Ungraded
- Enrollment: 709 (2010-2011 school year)
- Average class size: 16
- Student to teacher ratio: 12.43
- Campus: Rural: Remote
- Colors: Green and White
- Athletics: Soccer, Tennis, Volleyball, Skiing, Basketball, Wrestling, Softball, Baseball, Track and Field, Golf
- Mascot: Eagles
- Yearbook: The Crest

Fillmore Central School is a public school in Fillmore, Allegany County, New York, U.S.A. that serves grades pre-K to grade 12, and is the only school operated by the Fillmore Central School District. Its superintendent is Michael Dodge. Its principal is Eric Talbot.
