= Marathon High School (New York) =

Combined middle and high school in Marathon, New York, United States

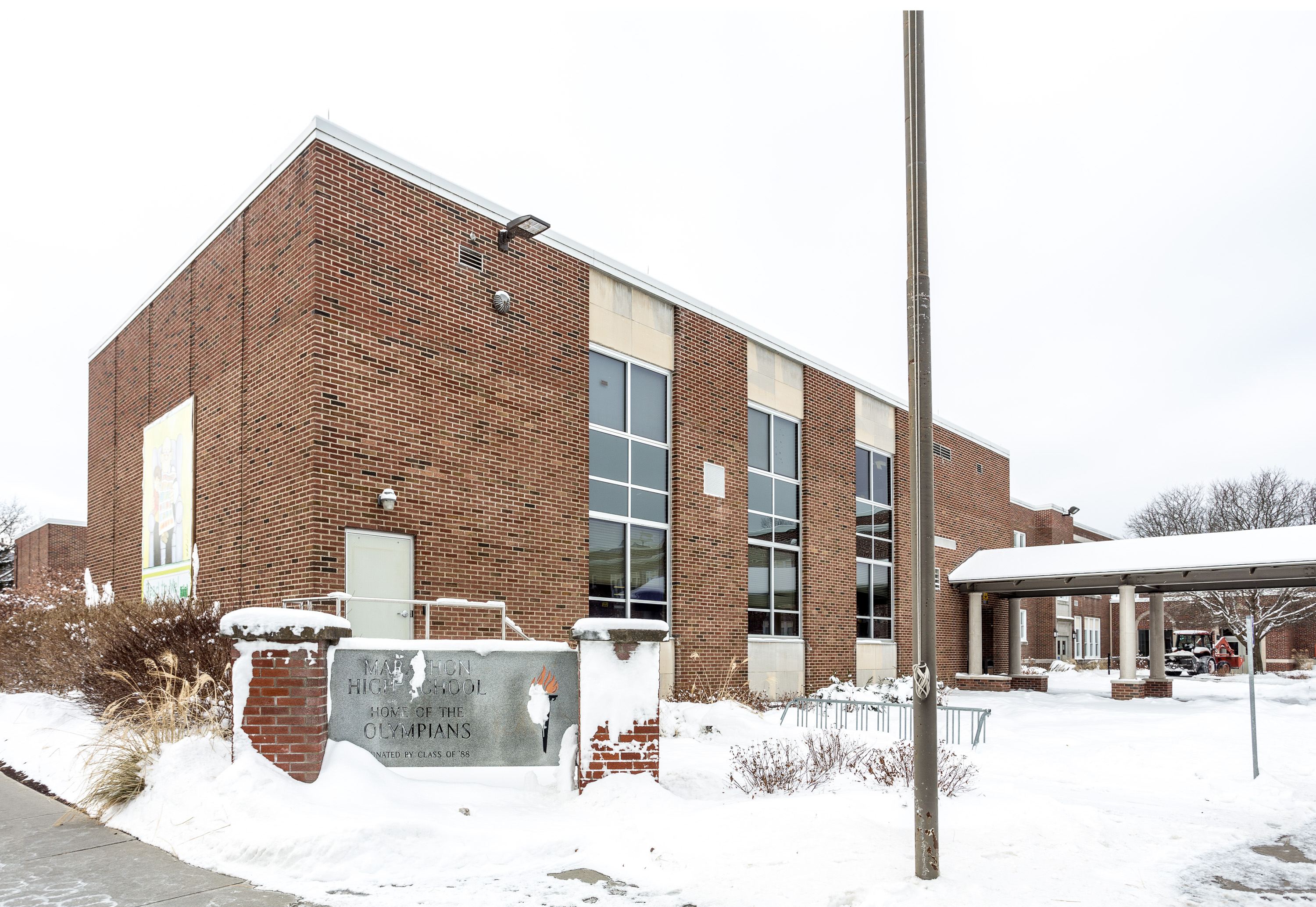

Location
- 1 East Main St; Marathon, (Cortland County), New York 13803; United States; 42.4414°N 76.0344°W

Information
- School type: Public school (government funded), combined middle and high school
- School district: Marathon Central School District
- NCES District ID: 3618450
- Superintendent: Rebecca Stone
- CEEB code: 333035
- NCES School ID: 361845001661
- Principal: Holly Marcolina
- Teaching staff: 33.04 (on an FTE basis)
- Grades: 7–12
- Gender: Coeducational
- Enrollment: 319 (2023-2024)
- Student to teacher ratio: 9.65
- Campus: Rural: Distant
- Colors: Black and Orange
- Mascot: Olympians

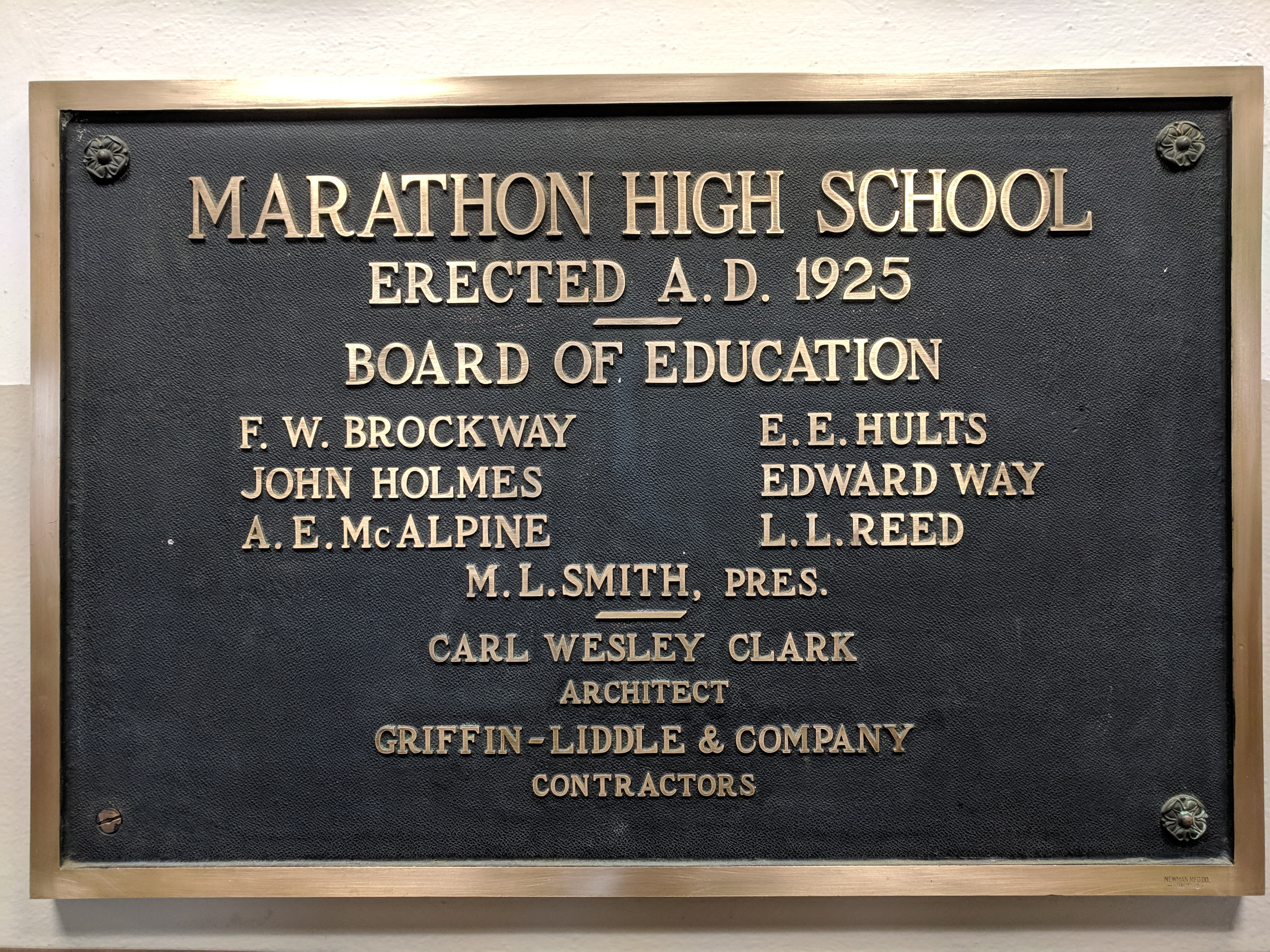
Plaque

Marathon High School is a public high school located in Marathon, Cortland County, New York, U.S.A., and is the only high school operated by the Marathon Central School District.
