= Notre Dame High School (Batavia, New York) =

Location
- 73 Union Street; Batavia, (Genesee County), New York 14020; United States; 43°0′26″N 78°11′48″W

Information
- Type: Private, Coeducational
- Motto: Vita Dulcedo Spes (Life, Sweetness, Hope)
- Religious affiliation: Roman Catholic Church
- Established: 1951
- Status: Open; rolling admission
- CEEB code: 330335
- Administrator: Tom Rapone
- Principal: Lindsay Warner
- Teaching staff: 33 (2024)
- Grades: 7-12
  - Grade 9: 37
  - Grade 10: 31
  - Grade 11: 36
  - Grade 12: 36
- Average class size: 40
- Student to teacher ratio: about 9:1
- Colors: Navy and Gold
- Fight song: Notre Dame Victory March
- Athletics: Cross Country (Boys' & Girls'), Football, Volleyball (Girls'), Soccer (Girls'), Fall Cheerleading, Basketball (Boys' & Girls'), Winter Cheerleading, Ice Hockey, Swimming (Boys' & Girls'), Baseball, Golf, Softball, Tennis, Track & Field (Boys' & Girls'),
- Athletics conference: Genesee Region Section V
- Mascot: Leprechaun
- Team name: Fighting Irish
- Newspaper: NODAHI
- Yearbook: Mater Dei
- Tuition: $8,950 per student (2016/2017)
- Feeder schools: St. Joseph School, Batavia NY
- Website: www.ndhsbatavia.com

Notre Dame High School is a private, Roman Catholic high school in Batavia, New York within the Diocese of Buffalo.

== Background ==
Notre Dame was established in 1951. Notre Dame is the only Catholic high school between Buffalo and Rochester. The school serves 7-12 grades in a college prep curriculum.
