= Alfred-Almond Junior-Senior High School =

Location
- 6795 Route 21; Almond, (Allegany County), New York 14804; United States
- 42.295381°N 77.748625°W

Information
- School type: Public school (government funded), combined middle and high school
- School district: Alfred-Almond Central School District
- NCES District ID: 3602700
- Superintendent: Brett Dusinberre
- CEEB code: 330135
- NCES School ID: 360270000046
- Principal: Melissa Rivers
- Teaching staff: 29.00 (on an FTE basis)
- Grades: 7–12
- Enrollment: 243 (2023-2024)
- Student to teacher ratio: 8.38
- Campus: Rural: Distant
- Colors: Blue and Gold
- Mascot: Eagles
- Newspaper: Observer

Alfred-Almond Junior-Senior High School is a small public high school in Almond, New York, United States. It is the only high school operated by the Alfred-Almond Central School District.

== Notable alumni ==
- John Tuttle, class of 1977, olympian
