= Lima Christian School =

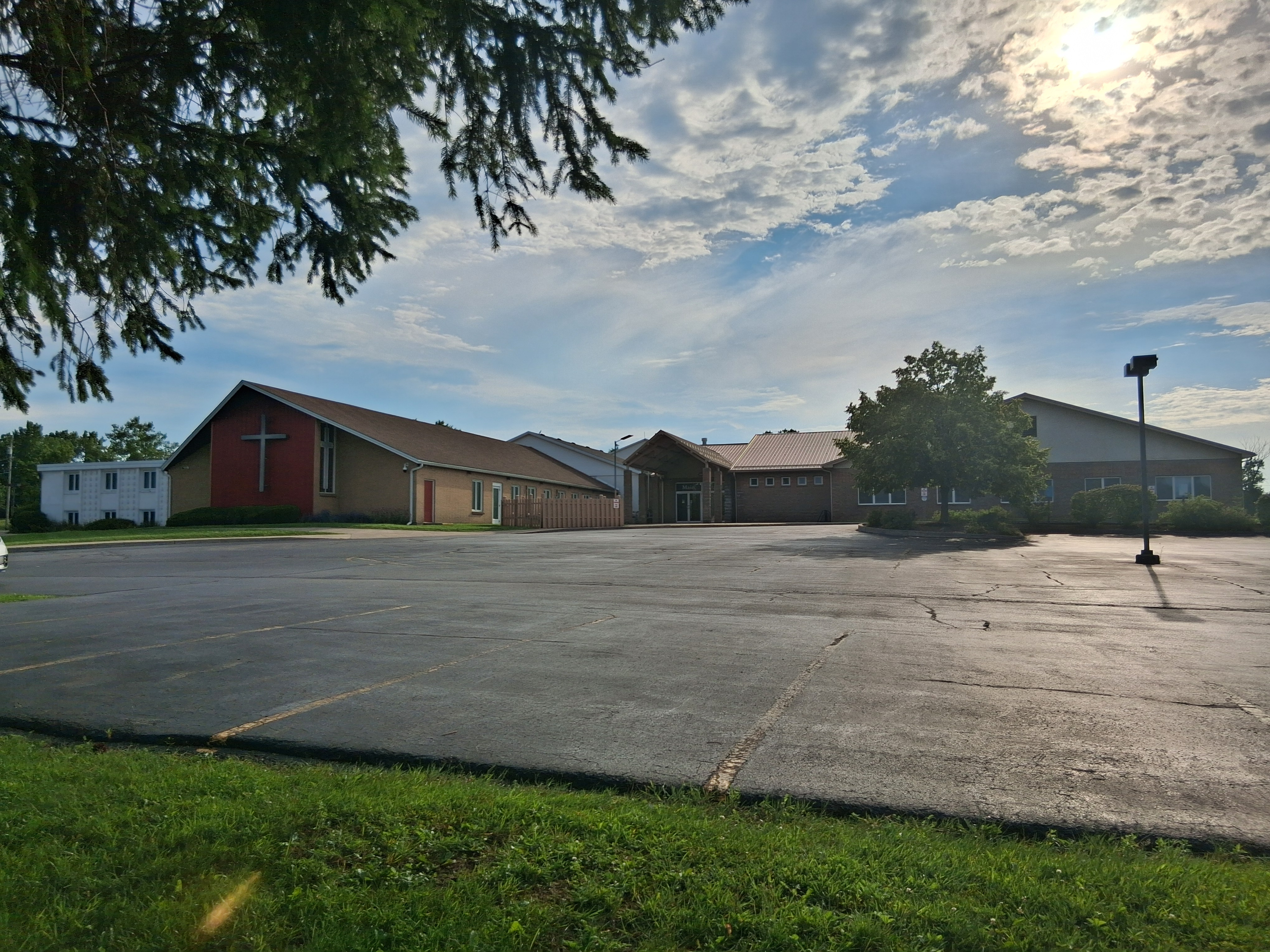
- Front of school

Location
- 1574 Rochester Street; Lima, New York 14485; United States; 42.9162°N 77.6130°W

Information
- Website: http://www.limachristian.org/

Lima Christian School is a private Christian school located in Lima, New York. It serves grades kindergarten through 12.

The school was founded in 1974 by Lima Baptist Church Pastor Noah Stoltzfus.

== Current ==
Lima Christian School, affectionately called LCS by alumni and current enrollees, is a ministry of the connected Church, Crossroads Church. There are very few students currently enrolled (2025, around 100 students).
