= Crown Point Central School =

School district in New York, United States

Location
- 2758 Main St; Crown Point, New York 12928; United States; 43°57′7.03″N 73°25′44.25″W

Information
- Type: Public
- School district: Crown Point Central School District
- NCES District ID: 3608610
- Superintendent: Shari Brannock
- NCES School ID: 360861000661
- Principal: Tara Celotti
- Teaching staff: 22.88 (on an FTE basis)
- Grades: PK-12
- Enrollment: 310 (2024-2025)
- Student to teacher ratio: 13.55
- Campus: Rural: Remote
- Colors: Black and Gold
- Mascot: Panthers
- Website: cpcsteam.org

Crown Point Central School is a school in Essex County, New York, that serves grades Pre-K to Grade 12. The superintendent is Ms. Shari Brannock, and the principal is Ms. Tara Celotti.

== Administration ==
=== School officials ===
- Ms. Shari Brannock – superintendent
- Ms. Tara Celotti – principal
- Ms. Margot Anello – school psychologist
- Ms. Jill Spring – district tax collector
- Ms. Victoria Tuthill-Russell – district treasurer

=== Board of education ===
- Mr. Mitch St Pierre – president
- Ms. Jacalyn Popp – vice president
- Ms. Julie Budwick
- Ms. Kimberly Woods
- Mr. Kevin Gadway
- Mr. Kenneth LaDeau
- Ms. Sharon Reynolds

== History ==
=== Selected former superintendents ===
Previous assignment and reason for departure noted in parentheses

- Mr. A. Jack Roberts
- Mr. Boyd McKendrick – ?-2003
- Mr. James M. Bier – 2003-2004

=== Selected former principals ===
- Mr. Michael Stuart
