= Skaneateles High School =

Location
- 49 E Elizabeth St; Skaneateles, New York 13152; United States; 42°57′04.9″N 76°25′15.8″W

Information
- Type: Public
- Motto: The Laker Way
- School district: Skaneateles Central School District
- NCES School ID: 362694003668
- Principal: Michael Caraccio
- Teaching staff: 43.15 (on an FTE basis)
- Grades: 9-12
- Enrollment: 409 (2023-2024)
- Student to teacher ratio: 9.48
- Campus: Rural
- Colors: Navy Blue and Vegas Gold
- Mascot: Lakers
- Yearbook: Comet
- Website: www.skanschools.org/highschool

Skaneateles Senior High School is a public high school in Onondaga County, New York, United States and is the highest level of the Skaneateles Central School District.

== Skaneateles Central School District ==
Belle H. Waterman Elementary School serves students from grades Kindergarten through second grade. State Street Elementary School serves third grade through fifth grade students. Skaneateles Middle School, adjacent to the high school, serves grades sixth through eighth, and Skaneateles High School serves ninth through twelfth.

== Curriculum ==
Skaneateles High School offers more than 130 different courses in English, Social Studies, mathematics, science, foreign language, art, business, health, home economics, technology education, music, and physical education. Additional vocational training opportunities are available to Skaneateles students through the Cayuga-Onondaga BOCES.
