= Morrisville-Eaton Central School District =

School district in the U.S. state of New York

Coordinates: 42.912°N 75.688°W

Location
- Morrisville, New York United States

District information
- Grades: 6-12
- Superintendent: Gregory Molloy

Students and staff
- Students: Approx. 500

Other information
- Website: www.m-ecs.org

Morrisville-Eaton Central School District is located in Morrisville, New York, U.S.A. It is located in Madison County, in the center of New York State. It is a small rural village roughly 30 miles southeast of Syracuse and 30 miles southwest of Utica. Morrisville had a population of 2,148 for the 2000 census. The school district consists of the Edward R. Andrews Elementary School and Morrisville-Eaton Junior/Senior High School. Grades K-5 attend the elementary school, while 6-12 attends the Jr./Sr. High School. The Morrisville-Eaton Central School District serves approximately 15,190 residents in seven townships which are: Eaton, Fenner, Lebanon, Lincoln, Nelson, Smithfield, and Stockbridge. The elementary and high school are host to about 450 students apiece.

The elementary school was built in 1935 with a large addition added in 1955. The high school was constructed in 1967 and was first used in March, 1968. In May 1999, voters approved an $11,600,000 renovation project for the high school, in which a large portion of this project included adding onto the school for more classroom space. It also added a track and new football field. This project was completed in 2004.

== Athletics ==
The high school offers a wide range of extra activities for its students. Fall sports include field hockey, boys and girls soccer, and football. Winter sports include a wrestling team, boys and girls basketball, volleyball, and a cheerleading squad. Spring sports include track, baseball, softball, and tennis. Morrisville is probably most recognized for their field hockey team, coach Patti Vaughan is currently 4th on New York State's All-Time wins list. The school's mascot is the Warrior and the school colors are white and scarlet.
