= Heatly Junior-Senior High School =

Heatly School

Location
- 171 Hudson Ave; Green Island, (Albany County), New York 12183; United States; 42.746092°N 73.690241°W

Information
- School type: Public school (government funded), elementary school
- School district: Green Island Union Free School District
- NCES District ID: 3612660
- Superintendent: Kimberly Ross
- CEEB code: 332180
- NCES School ID: 361266001043
- Principal: Erin Peteani
- Faculty: 32.50 (on an FTE basis)
- Grades: K–5
- Enrollment: 267 (2018-19)
- Student to teacher ratio: 8.22
- Campus: Suburb: Large
- Colors: Green and White
- Mascot: Hornets

Heatly School is a public elementary school located in Green Island, Albany County, New York, U.S.A., and its high school students now are going to Watervliet City School District. The school is named after James Heatly, who was the Superintendent of Schools from 1880 to 1924. Heatly School was renovated in the 1950s and an addition, including a new gymnasium, laboratories, additional classrooms and other renovations were built beginning in 2006.
