= Canastota High School =

Canastota Junior-Senior High School

Location
- 120 Roberts Street; Canastota, New York 13032; United States
- Coordinates: 43°4′59″N 75°44′41″W

Information
- School district: Canastota Central School District
- Superintendent: Shawn Bissetta
- Principal: Robert Carter
- Teaching staff: 45.96 (FTE)
- Grades: 7-12
- Gender: CO-ED
- Enrollment: 556 (2023–2024)
- International students: Foreign Exchange through Canastota Rotary Club
- Student to teacher ratio: 12.10
- Schedule: 9 Period 6 day rotational schedule
- Hours in school day: 6
- Colors: Maroon, Gold, White
- Mascot: Raiders

Canastota High School is a secondary school located on Roberts Street in Canastota, New York, United States. It is operated by Canastota Central School District, also known as Canastota Central Schools.

U.S. News and World Report ranks the school as #9836 nationally, with an overall score of 44.29/100.

In April 2023, the school received a "swatting" threat by email.

The school was scheduled to host a Special Olympics Spring Games in May 2023.
