= Beaver River Central School =

School district in New York, United States

Address
- 9508 Artz Rd Beaver Falls, New York, 13305; United States
- Coordinates: 43.8808°N 75.4371°W

District information
- Type: Public
- Grades: K-12
- Established: 1954
- Superintendent: Todd Green
- NCES District ID: 3604200

Students and staff
- Enrollment: 851 (2021-2022)
- Teachers: 63.96 (on an FTE basis)
- Staff: 99.50 (on an FTE basis)
- Student–teacher ratio: 13.31
- District mascot: Beavers
- Colors: Green, Orange and White

Other information
- Website: www.brcsd.org

Beaver River Central School is a small K-12 school in Beaver Falls in northern Lewis County. As of 2011, it had a total enrollment of 893 and a graduating class of 66. In 2011, 68% of graduates went on to two-year colleges, technical schools, or four-year colleges.

The superintendent is Todd Green, and the high school principal is Daniel Rains.

== History ==
The school district was centralized in 1954 and has an enrollment of 900 students, all in one building. In 1968 they added a high school gymnasium and a pool. In 1996 they added six classrooms to the middle school wing. Then in 2002 a $16.5 million Capital Project greatly enhanced the facilities. It added an elementary gym and locker rooms, six elementary classrooms and six high school class rooms. They also did renovations to the Library and Home Economics rooms. The District Office, Business Office, and Superintendent Office were moved downstairs in new offices.

== Sports ==
Beaver River is in section 3 of New York State and is part of the Frontier League. It offers fall, winter and spring sports. Fall sports are girls' swimming, football, cross-country, boys' and girls' soccer and girls tennis. Winter sports are boys' swimming, wrestling, boys' and girls' basketball and volleyball. Spring sports are baseball, softball, and track and field. Beaver River has won 22 New York State class championships in cross country running: 4 girls and 18 boys as of 2019. Beaver River also boasts a small, but still thriving Musical Program that enlists a various amounts of Musicals including everything from Alice in Wonderland to Little Shop of Horrors.
