= Sodus Central School District =

School district in New York, United States

Address
- 6375 Robinson Road Sodus, New York, 14551; United States

District information
- Type: Public
- Grades: PreK–12
- NCES District ID: 3627120

Students and staff
- Students: 1,029 (2020–2021)
- Teachers: 113.8 (on an FTE basis)
- Staff: 101.3 (on an FTE basis)
- Student–teacher ratio: 9.04:1

Other information
- Website: www.soduscsd.org

The Sodus Central School District is a public school district in New York, United States. It serves approximately 1400 students in the town of Sodus in Wayne County, and has a staff of 200.

The average class size is 20 students (all grades). The student-teacher ratio is 13:1 (elementary), 17:1 (middle-high school).

The district motto is "Excellence in Education". The school's mascot is the Sodus Spartan. Sodus has modified, junior varsity, and varsity sports, based on three sport seasons. Fall sports include soccer for boys and girls, cross country, and girls' tennis. Winter sports include wrestling (coached by Dastyck), co-ed swimming, indoor track, basketball, and skiing. Spring sports include track and field, boys' tennis, softball, and baseball.

The school has a weight room, a pool (Olympic length but 12 1/2 feet at its deepest spot, with diving boards), three gyms in the high-middle school complex, and a playground at the middle school next to the administrative offices. The primary school has a gym, a playground and a large field with a softball field. Near the track is the main softball field, and the baseball field is near that.

The school teaches all courses which are standard in New York, plus Spanish, technical courses and parenting classes, plus accelerated courses. Sodus has student teachers that come in for about one quarter of the year. The school also has a science teacher who has her doctorate.

Nelson Kise is the Superintendent of the school district as of 2018.

== Board of education ==
The Board of Education consists of seven members who serve rotating three-year terms. Elections are held each May for board members and to vote on the school district budget.

Current board members (2021-2022) are:

- Laura Steffler-Alampi-President
- Jason Walters
- Alden Atkins
- Tony Cincinello
- Jeff Martinez
- Brian Wagner
- Sarah Williams

== Schools ==
The district's middle and high schools are located on a common campus on Mill Street, with the elementary school nearby on Route 88, in the town of Sodus.

=== Elementary schools ===
- Sodus Elementary School (PK-3)

=== Middle school ===
- Sodus Middle School (4-6)

=== High school ===
- Sodus High School (7-12)

== Performance ==
The district's 90% graduation rate exceeds the state standard of 55%.

== Sports ==
Sodus won the boys New York state class C basketball championship in 2005 led by Gregg Logins Jr Sodus won the boys Section V championship in soccer in class C1 2018
