= Poland Central School =

Poland Central. School

Location
- 74 Cold Brook Street; Poland, New York 13431; United States; 43°13′42″N 75°03′24″W

Information
- Superintendent: Laura Dutton
- Principal: Gregory Cuthbertson (high school, elementary and middle school principal)
- Budget: $12,460,905 (2008-2009)
- Website: http://www.polandcs.org/

Poland Central School is a K-12 (primary and secondary) school in Poland, New York, United States, located in Herkimer County. It is part of the Poland Central School District.

== Overview ==
Total enrollment (Pre-K through 12) for the 2007-08 school year was 697 students.

The current school building was originally constructed in 1936, with expansions in 1957, 1962, and 1976.

In May 2008, voters approved a budget of $12,460,905.

== Sports ==
The boys baseball team won the 1990 State Championship.

In 2012 and 2020, the Girls Varsity Soccer team won the Class D New York State Championship.
