= Elizabeth Page =

Elizabeth Page may refer to:

- Elizabeth Page (novelist) (1889–1969), American author
- Elizabeth Page (screenwriter), American writer, director, and filmmaker
- Elizabeth Fry Page, American author and editor
- Molly Stark (born Elizabeth Page; 1737–1814), American Revolutionary War figure
