= William F. Durand =

American mechanical engineer (1859–1958)

William Frederick Durand
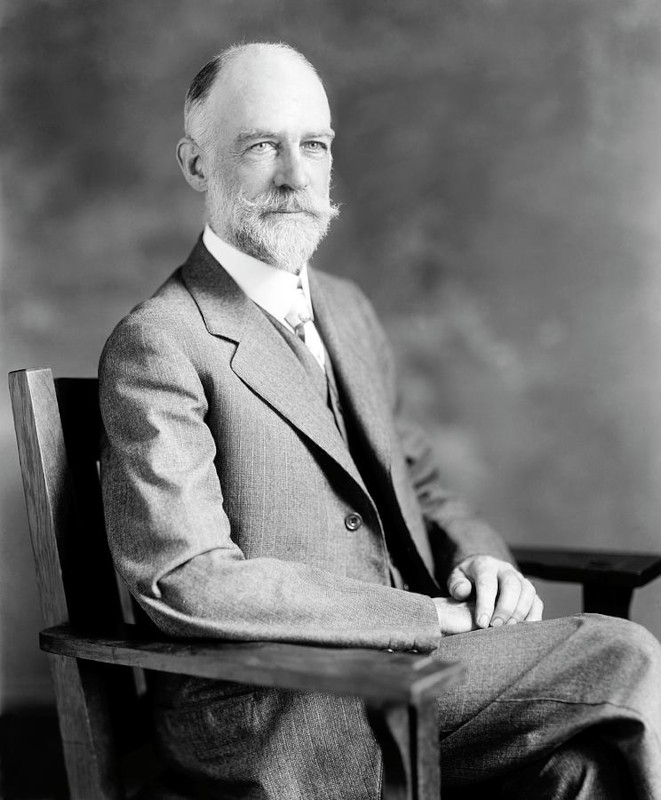
- Born: March 5, 1859; Beacon Falls, Connecticut, US
- Died: August 9, 1958 (aged 99)
- Scientific career
- Known for: pioneering research in aeronautics and propellers
- Awards: Daniel Guggenheim Medal (1935); John Fritz Medal (1936); ASME Medal (1945); Medal for Merit (1946)
- Fields: Aeronautics
- Workplaces: National Advisory Committee for Aeronautics; National Academy of Sciences; National Research Council; National Bureau of Standards; American Society of Mechanical Engineers; Royal Aeronautical Society; Stanford University; Cornell University; Michigan State University; Worcester Polytechnic Institute; Lafayette College; United States Naval Academy Lafayette College
- Thesis: Graphical representation of optical laws (1888)
- Military career
- Allegiance: United States
- Branch: United States Navy
- Service years: 1876–1887
- Rank: Assistant Engineer

Chairman of the NACA
- In office 1916–1918
- President: Woodrow Wilson
- Preceded by: George P. Scriven
- Succeeded by: John R. Freeman

William Frederick Durand (March 5, 1859 – August 9, 1958) was a United States naval officer and pioneer mechanical engineer. He contributed significantly to the development of aircraft propellers. He was the first civilian chair of the National Advisory Committee for Aeronautics, the forerunner of NASA.

A native of Connecticut, he was a member of the first graduating class of Birmingham High School in Derby, Connecticut (now Derby High School) in 1877. He graduated second in his class at the United States Naval Academy at Annapolis and received his Ph.D. from Lafayette College. He went on to teach at the Michigan State College, Cornell University and Stanford University, teaching that school's first course in aeronautics, the second offered by any school in the country (the first was offered by the Massachusetts Institute of Technology). He helped rebuild Stanford after the 1906 earthquake, and the department of Aeronautical and Astronautical Engineering building bears his name. A memorial there reads: "His first professional assignment in 1880 was on the USS Tennessee, a full rigged wooden ship with auxiliary steam power. His last, 1942–46 was as chairman of the National Aeronautical Commission for the development of jet propulsion for aircraft." He died in 1958 at the age of 99.

== Biography ==
=== Early life ===
William Frederick Durand was born on March 5, 1859, in Beacon Falls, Connecticut. He was the fourth and youngest child and second son to William Leavenworth Durand and Ruth née Coe. When Durand was one year old his family moved to Derby, Connecticut. During high school Durand showed an aptitude in mathematics; he took extra curricular studies from the principal in analytic geometry and worked as a surveyor's assistant. Durand's brother strongly recommended that he take engineering at the United States Naval Academy. The Academy's entrance exams at the time tested for familiarization with machine tools, so Durand dropped attendance in the spring semester of high school in 1876 to work in the tool room of a factory in Ansonia, Connecticut. Durand was one of five to graduate in the first high school graduating class.

To further prepare for the Navy Academy entrance exams, Durand attended a summer course at the Maryland Agricultural College taught by a retired American Civil War naval veteran. Travelling to Maryland for the classes, Durand stopped at the Centennial Exposition where the Corliss steam engine made a lifelong impression.

=== Naval career ===
In 1876, Durand was one of 80 applicants testing for 25 openings at the academy. His first examination was in elementary mechanics, presided over by A. A. Michelson. Durand placed tenth in the exams and was admitted into the academy. During summers Durand cruised on board USS Mayflower.

At the time graduates of the U. S. Naval Academy did not receive commission upon graduation but were required to serve two years of sea duty before being eligible. Durand graduated in 1880 from the academy with the rank of cadet engineer and was assigned to USS Tennessee, flagship of the North Atlantic Squadron. Also assigned to Tennessee was Durand's classmate Midshipman W. S. Sims. After two years at sea Durand was given a week-long oral exam by the Naval Examining Board. Durand passed the exam and was commissioned as Assistant Engineer.

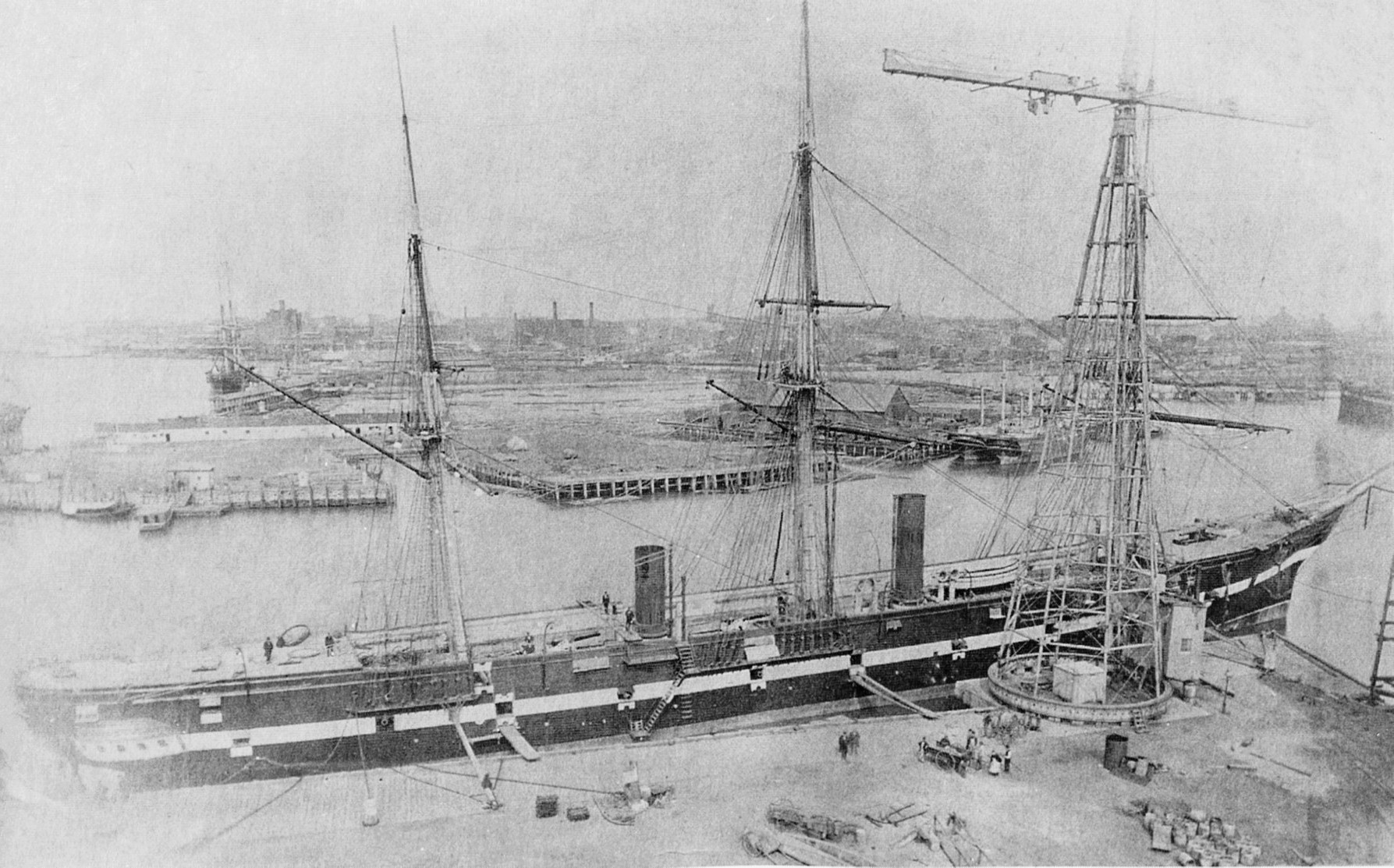
Tennessee at Brooklyn Navy Yard in 1875.

Durand continued to serve on Tennessee until June 1883, when he was transferred to the Bureau of Steam Engineering. There Durand was assigned to work on the design of the engines for USS Chicago. While there an Act of Congress titled "To Promote a Knowledge of Steam Engineering and Iron Shipbuilding Act" provided officers of the Engineer Corps of the Navy as instructors to scientific and technical institutions in the United States. Durand requested a tour of duty at Lafayette College in Easton, Pennsylvania. While there Durand married Charlotte Kneen on October 23, 1883, and had a son on June 14, 1885. Durand earned a Ph.D. in engineering from Lafayette while there.

In autumn 1885 Durand was transferred to the Morgan Iron Works as an inspector on the engines for USS Boston and USS Atlanta. In November 1885 Durand received a telegram ordering him to the Brooklyn Navy Yard to participate in sea trials of USS Dolphin. The recently completed Dolphin had received an adverse report from the Board of Inspection and Survey. Among the findings was a claim of structural weakness. Captain R. W. Meade suggested to Secretary of Navy William C. Whitney that he take Dolphin to sea in search of a storm. Dolphin was outfitted at Newport, Rhode Island, and in late November the ship sailed for Cape Hatteras, where a storm of strong wind and heavy seas was known to be. The test plan consisted of: two hours of steaming under full power directly into the storm, two hours steaming with the wind 45 degrees off the bow, two hours with the wind amidships, two hours off the quarter, and two hours with the storm astern. Dolphin passed the storm test and sailed to the Norfolk Navy Yard.

Durand requested and received duty as a naval engineering instructor at Worcester Polytechnic Institute in Worcester, Massachusetts, arriving in March 1887.

=== Honors ===
- Member of the American Philosophical Society (1917)
- Member of the United States National Academy of Sciences (1917)
- Fellow of the Royal Aeronautical Society (1918)
- Fellow of the American Academy of Arts and Sciences (1921)
- LL.D. (Honorary) University of California (1924)
- LL.D. (Honorary) University of Utah (1927)
- Honorary Member of the American Society of Mechanical Engineers (1934)
- Daniel Guggenheim Medal (1935)
- Franklin Medal (1938)
- D.Eng. (Honorary) Worcester Polytechnic Institute (1938)
- John J. Carty Award of the National Academy of Sciences (1945)
- American Society of Mechanical Engineering Medal (1945)
- Presidential Medal for Merit (1946)
- Wright Brothers Memorial Trophy (1948)
- Durand Building at Stanford University
- Durand Road near Moffett Federal Airfield

== Work ==
=== Michigan State and Cornell ===
While in Worcester Durand was approached by a member of the board of trustees of Michigan State College. Michigan State was looking for someone to create and head a mechanical engineering program. Durand accepted the position and resigned his commission with the US Navy effective 15 September 1887.

Durand worked at Michigan State in Lansing, Michigan, for four years, creating the Department of Mechanical Engineering.

In late Spring 1891 Durand accepted the chair of mechanical engineering at Purdue University in Lafayette, Indiana. Later in the summer Durand learned that Robert H. Thurston, Director of Sibley College at Cornell University, was looking for someone to lead a planned post-graduate school of the College in Naval Architecture and Marine Engineering. Thurston agreed to hire Durand, and the administrators at Purdue agreed to let him go if he could find a suitable replacement for Purdue. Professor John Joseph Flather of the University of Minnesota accepted the position at Purdue, and Durand went to Cornell. Shortly after arriving Durand became the secretary of the Sibley faculty.

In 1892, Durand was elected a member of Sigma Xi, an engineering honors fraternity that started at Cornell in 1886. Durand would later become National President of the Society in 1936.

=== Logarithm paper, radial planimeter, and marine propeller research ===
Three accomplishments Durand thought noteworthy during his years at Cornell were the development of logarithmic paper, developing theoretically and mechanically an averaging radial planimeter, and research on marine propellers.

In 1893, Durand developed and introduced Logarithmic graph paper, where the logarithmic scale is marked off in distances proportional to the logarithms of the values being represented. Keuffel and Esser Company listed logarithmic paper in their general catalog as "Durand's Logarithmic Paper" as late as 1936.

In 1893, Durand published a paper mathematically describing a radial planimeter for averaging values plotted in polar coordinates. Originally a radial planimeter was of academic interest only, but ten years later clock driven recording instruments started being used. Durand created working device based on his theory. He patented the device and received royalties from a scientific instrument company making the devices until the patent expired.

Durand conducted research on the theory of operation of marine screw propellers while at Cornell. Using funding from the Carnegie Institute, a concrete canal was built in the Hydraulic Laboratory for the study of propellers. Approximately forty-nine twelve inch diameter model propellers with varying pitch and proportion were tested over the course of several years.

On October 25, 1903, Robert Thurston died and Durand became acting Director of Sibley College while Cornell searched for a permanent replacement. When A. W. Smith of Stanford University became Director David Starr Jordan, president of Stanford, offered Durand a position at Stanford to replace the vacancy created by the leaving of Smith. Durand accepted the offer and moved to Stanford in August 1904.

=== Stanford (1904–1917) ===
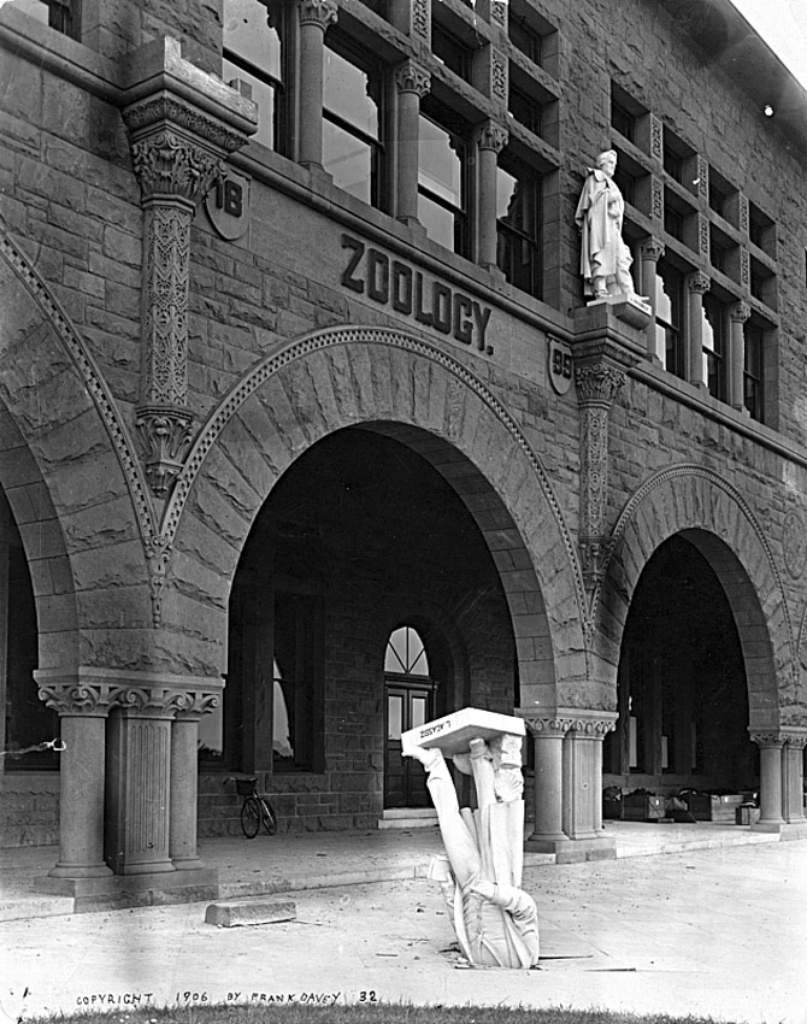
A statue of geologist Louis Agassiz was toppled from a Stanford University facade.

Durand was the director of the mechanical engineering department and acting director of the electrical engineering department. Durand recruited H. J. Ryan from Cornell to be director of electrical engineering, a position Ryan held from 1905 until his death in 1934.

At 5:20 AM on April 20, 1906, Durand was awakened by the 1906 San Francisco earthquake. A marble statue of Louis Agassiz fell headfirst, piercing the concrete sidewalk. University president Jordan commented "Agassiz was always a hard-headed scientist." Durand was appointed to a Board of Engineers tasked with clearing the ruins and making temporary repairs allowing the university to reopen in the fall. Stanford reopened in September for fall semester, and reconstruction was not completed until 1908.

In 1912 Durand chaired the Committee of Management in preparation for the Engineering Congress held in conjunction with the 1915 Panama–Pacific International Exposition. George Washington Goethals was Honorary President of the Congress. Afterwards Durand compiled and edited the papers read before the congress into 18 volumes, mailing them to subscribers.

=== The NACA ===
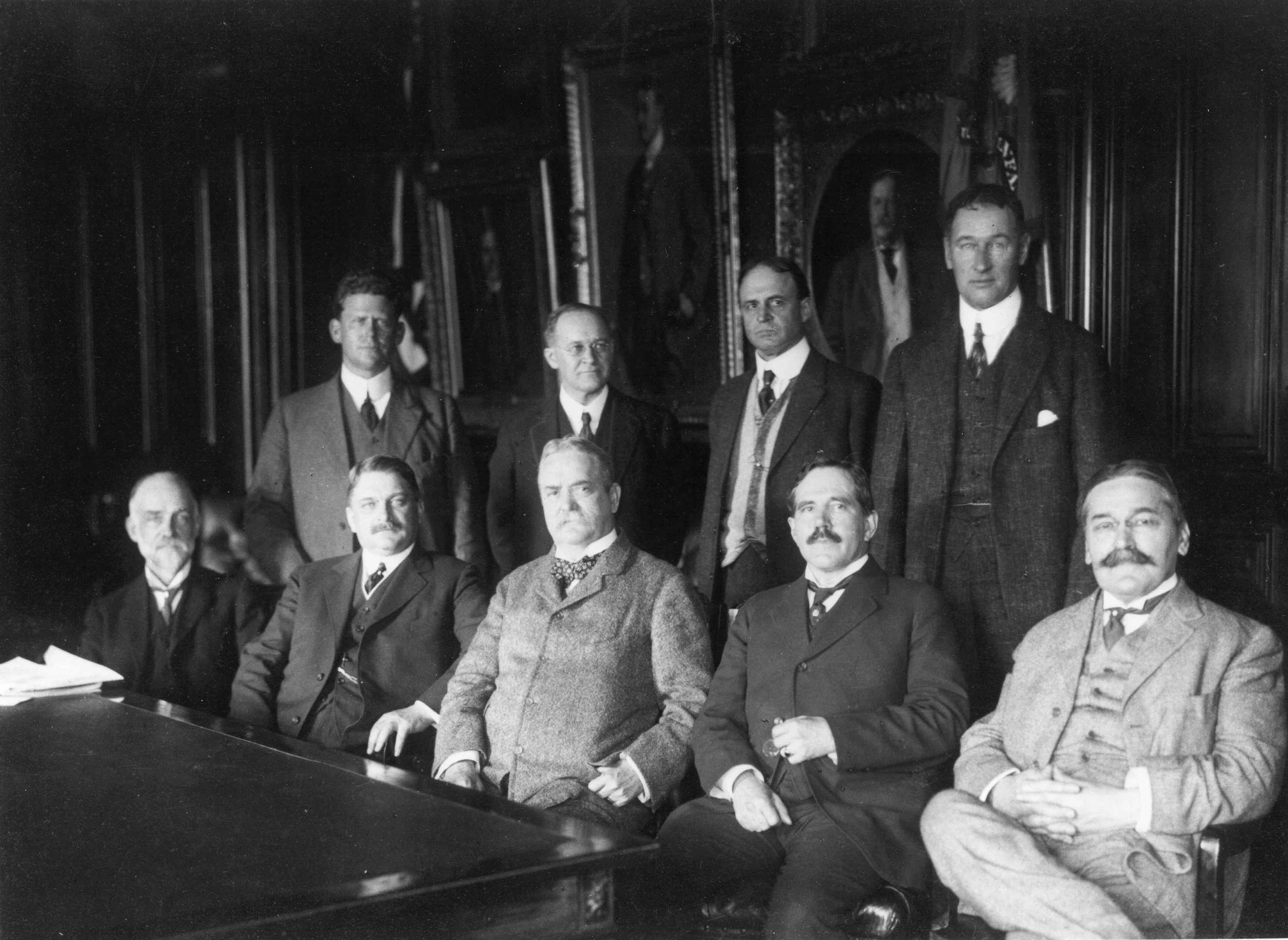
The first meeting of the NACA in 1915. Durand is seated far left

In 1914 Durand attended a conference convened by Charles Doolittle Walcott, secretary of the Smithsonian Institution in Washington, D.C., for the purpose of stimulating interest in aeronautic science, and its relation to the U. S. government. The conference led to an act of congress organizing an Advisory Committee for Aeronautics (later the National Advisory Committee for Aeronautics) "to supervise and direct the scientific study of the problems of flight with a view to their practical solution." This committee was composed of twelve members, two each from the Army and Navy, one each representing the Smithsonian Institution, the Weather Bureau, and the National Bureau of Standards. Five additional members were chosen "who shall be acquainted with the needs of aeronautical science, either civil or military, or skilled in aeronautical engineering or its allied sciences." Brigadier General George P. Scriven, Chief Signal Officer of the Army, was chairman of the committee, Walcott was elected chairman of the Executive Committee. President Woodrow Wilson appointed Durand as one of the civilian members of the Committee.

Durand became Chairman of the NACA in the fall of 1916 at the second meeting of the full committee.

Durand proposed to the NACA the need for research on aircraft propellers, modeled on the work he had done on marine propellers at Cornell. The Committee agreed and Stanford University was contracted to perform the testing. Working with Professor Edward P. Lesley, Durand conducted the air propeller research for the following twelve or fifteen years. Test results were published to the Committee and annually in reports.

=== World War I ===
The United States declared war on Germany in April, 1917. Durand obtained a leave of absence from Stanford to devote working full-time at the NACA. The United States concentrated on developing training, reconnaissance, and bomber airplanes while relying on the British and French for fighters. The NACA directed the development of the Liberty aeronautical engine.

An impediment early in the war to rapidly improving aircraft were concerns about aircraft patents. To address this a conference of the leaders of the aircraft industry was convened. After several sessions a cross-license agreement was arranged calling for the common use of all important aircraft patents for the duration of the war.

Durand worked to create aviation ground schools at between six and ten universities for the creation of aviation ground schools. The ground school curricula included aircraft control, flight theory, science, and meteorology.

Durand first flew in an airplane in 1917. That year the Italian government was showcasing a large triplane built in the city of Genoa to U. S. Government officials hoping for sales. A party of four or five officials took a trip from Langley Field to Washington, D.C., a distance of 120 miles, lasting over an hour.

In 1917 Durand, metallurgist Dr. Henry M. Howe, and Dr. John J. Carty, Chief Engineer of the American Telephone and Telegraph Company were elected to the National Academy of Sciences to form the nucleus of an engineering section of the academy.

In autumn of 1917 Durand initiated the development of the airplane turbosuperchargers. The NACA had received incomplete reports that a French engineer named Auguste Rateau was attempting to develop engines for high altitudes using a turbo-driven air compressor. Remembering a graduate student named Sanford A. Moss who worked on gas driven turbo engines twenty years earlier at Cornell before starting a career at the gas turbine division of General Electric, Durand wrote to the president of GE, Mr. E. W. Rice requesting Dr. Moss' services. After this turbochargers became Moss' life work.

On May 11, 1918, President Woodrow Wilson signed an Executive Order creating the National Research Council, the working arm of the National Academy of Sciences. Durand was appointed head of the Engineering Division. Both the NACA and the NRC had offices in the Munsey Trust Building in Washington separated by two floors. Durand climbed stairs or rode the elevator several times a day between the two.

In December 1917 Durand, accompanied by his chief assistant Karl T. Compton and two others, traveled to Paris maintain continuous and close contact with developments in the applications of science in warfare. Upon arriving Durand was given the title Scientific Attaché to the U. S. Embassy, though he worked independently of Ambassador William Graves Sharp. He did take advantage of the embassy's diplomatic bag to send reports back to Washington.

In March 1918 Durand experienced the shelling of Paris by the German Paris gun. After an early morning air raid alarm was sounded Durand walked to the Place de la Concorde to witness the raid. Upon arriving at the obelisk he heard an explosion but was unable to see any airplanes. While searching the sky another explosion occurred. The bombardment continued throughout the day, with a shell landing every 15 to 20 minutes. One landed quite close to Durand, hitting the Tuileries Garden.

In June 1918 Durand traveled from Paris to London to give the annual Wilbur & Orville Wright Named Lecture of the Royal Aeronautical Society. Before an audience of 2000 people Durand give a lecture addressing the problems of aircraft design, construction and operation as factors in a war effort. On the occasion of his talk Durand was elected a Fellow of the society.

With the Armistice World War I ended on November 11, 1918. Durand returned to Stanford on February 22, 1919, and resumed teaching.

=== Retirement from Stanford, ASME, Bureau of Standards, U.S. Naval Academy ===
In 1924 Durand reached Stanford's mandatory retirement age of 65 and became Professor Emeritus. Durand continued testing model aircraft propellers, research that had begun under the NACA in 1915.

In fall 1924 Durand was elected to a one-year term as President of the American Society of Mechanical Engineers for 1925-26. Durand had been a continuous member of the society since joining while serving on board the USS Tennessee in 1883. To be near the society headquarters, Durand lived in Brooklyn, New York, during his term in office.

On September 10, 1924 Secretary of Commerce Herbert Hoover asked Durand to become a member of the Board of Visitors of the Bureau of Standards. The board visited the Bureau several times over the course of a year to confer and advise the Director and be a conduit between the Bureau and outside entities. Durand was a member of the board for several years.

In spring of 1925 Durand was appointed by President Calvin Coolidge to the Board of Visitors of the United States Naval Academy. The board visits the academy to attend classes, attend classes, observe drills and exercises and observe the overall performance of the institution.

=== Morrow Board ===
On September 3, 1925, the US Navy dirigible USS Shenandoah crashed in southeastern Ohio. US Army general Billy Mitchell accused the War and Navy Departments of causing the accident through "criminal negligence." The army brought court-martial charges against Mitchell. Due to public pressure President Coolidge created a Board of Aeronautic Inquiry chaired by Dwight Morrow.

On September 11, 1925, Durand learned over the radio that Coolidge had appointed him to the board. The board was tasked to study aeronautics in relation to national defense and advise the president on policy to develop aircraft in time of war. The board was composed of Morrow as chairman, U. S. Judge Arthur C. Denison as vice chairman, Durand as secretary, Hiram Bingham, James S. Parker, Carl Vinson, Maj. Gen. James G. Harbord (ret.), Rear Admiral Frank F. Fletcher (ret.), and Howard E. Coffin.

The first meeting of the board was held at the White House where Durand was chosen to be secretary of the board. After weeks of meetings receiving expert testimony and conferring the board submitted a report to the President recommending a near term development plan for military and naval aircraft. The report further recommended the creation of the offices of Assistant Secretary for Military and for Naval aircraft within the War and Navy Departments.

=== Continuing propeller research ===
In 1926 Durand and E. P. Lesley reported on comparisons of propeller efficiency in a wind tunnel versus free flight. Lesley tested seven propellers with a VE-7. Durand's wind tunnel model showed similar efficiency to Lesley's measurements, but lagged by 6% to 10% in thrust developed and power absorbed.

=== Guggenheim Fund ===
In 1926 or 1927 Durand was invited by Daniel Guggenheim to join the Board of Trustees of the Daniel Guggenheim Fund for the Promotion of Aeronautics. The board asked Durand to make recommendations on the proposal of creating an encyclopedia of aeronautics. Durand determined quickly that the overall field of aeronautics was still developing very rapidly and an encyclopedic overview would rapidly become obsolete. He recommended instead that fluid mechanics theory and its application to aeronautics was mature and stable enough for an encyclopedia. The board agreed, tasking Durand to direct and supervise the effort. Durand worked on the encyclopedia full-time for the next six years. He sailed to Europe and met Theodore von Kármán of Aachen University to find the best qualified authors. Twenty five authors wrote twenty divisions in six volumes for a total of 2200 pages. No American publisher was willing to print the encyclopedia due to concern of the number of potential sales. Springer & Co. of Berlin agreed to publish the volumes in English.

The final volume was published in 1936.

During World War II there was renewed demand for the encyclopedia and a second printing was made by photo-offset printing at the California Institute of Technology.

=== Colorado River, Special Committee on Airships, ===
In 1927 Durand became a member of a board of advisers to the Secretary of Work of the United States Department of the Interior. The board was tasked to survey the Colorado River to find solutions to annual flooding, silting, the development of hydroelectric power, and water usage for irrigation and by cities such as Los Angeles, California.

On 12 February 1935 The US Navy rigid airship USS Macon crashed in a storm off Point Sur, California. Investigations were conducted by a Naval Board of Inquiry and a scientific review board. Science Advisory Board Chairman Karl T. Compton appointed a Special Committee on Airships at the request of Secretary of the Navy Claude Swanson. Members of the committee were Robert A. Millikan and Theodore von Kármán of Caltech, William Hovgaard of M.I.T., Durand and Stephen Timoshenko of Stanford, Frank B. Jewett of Bell Telephone Laboratories, and Charles F. Kettering of General Motors. Durand was the chairman.

=== Ship stabilization ===
Upon request of the United States Department of the Navy, the National Academy of Sciences established a committee chaired by Durand to investigate anti-rolling devices on ships. The ability to stabilize a ship such as an aircraft carrier would be extremely useful during the landing of airplanes. The committee established an experimental laboratory at the Brooklyn Navy Yard. Dr. Nicolas Minorsky worked on roll stabilization of ships for the navy from 1934 to 1940, designing in 1938 an activated-tank stabilization system into a 5-ton model ship. A full-scale version of the system was tested in USS Hamilton but exhibited control stability problems. Very promising results were beginning to appear when the outbreak of the Second World War interrupted further development as the Hamilton was called to active duty and the 5 ton model was put into storage.

=== World War II ===
In March 1941 Chairman of the NACA Vannevar Bush asked the then 82-year-old Durand to head a committee to study and develop jet propulsion for aircraft. The committee was composed of members from General Electric, Westinghouse, and Allis-Chalmers. The committee agreed early that the three companies would work separately developing jet engines to promote diversity in design.

Chief of the Air Corp Henry H. Arnold obtained a Whittle jet engine from England which was turned over to the gas turbine division of GE in Lynn, Massachusetts, for test and copy. General Electric developed this into the J31. Durand witnessed a static test of the engine in Lynn, Massachusetts on July 13, 1942, alongside Sanford A. Moss, the engineer Durand had requested from General Electric for the development of turbosuperchargers during World War I. Moss had retired from GE but worked as a consultant on the jet engine. Durand and Moss spoke to each other of the early development of the turbosupercharger as the manager of the facility recorded their conversation. On October 2, 1941, Durand witnessed the first official flight of the J31 equipped Bell P-59 Airacomet at Muroc Army Air Field (today, Edwards Air Force Base). Westinghouse developed the J30 engine from this effort. Durand led the jet engine effort from April 2, 1941, to July 7, 1945, at which time Durand was 86 years old

Also beginning in early spring 1941 Durand chaired the Engineering Division of the National Research Council. Durand split his work days, mornings at the NACA, afternoons at the NRC. Durand was greatly helped by the NRC Division Executive Secretary William H. Kenerson of Brown University.

== Research resources ==
- Dams, Papers Concerning Design and Construction, 1903-1956 (3 linear ft.) are housed in the Department of Special Collections and University Archives at Stanford University Libraries
- William F. Durand Papers, 1893-1979 (1.25 linear ft.) are housed in the Department of Special Collections and University Archives at Stanford University Libraries
