= Linda Gist Calvin =

41st President General of the Daughters of the American Revolution

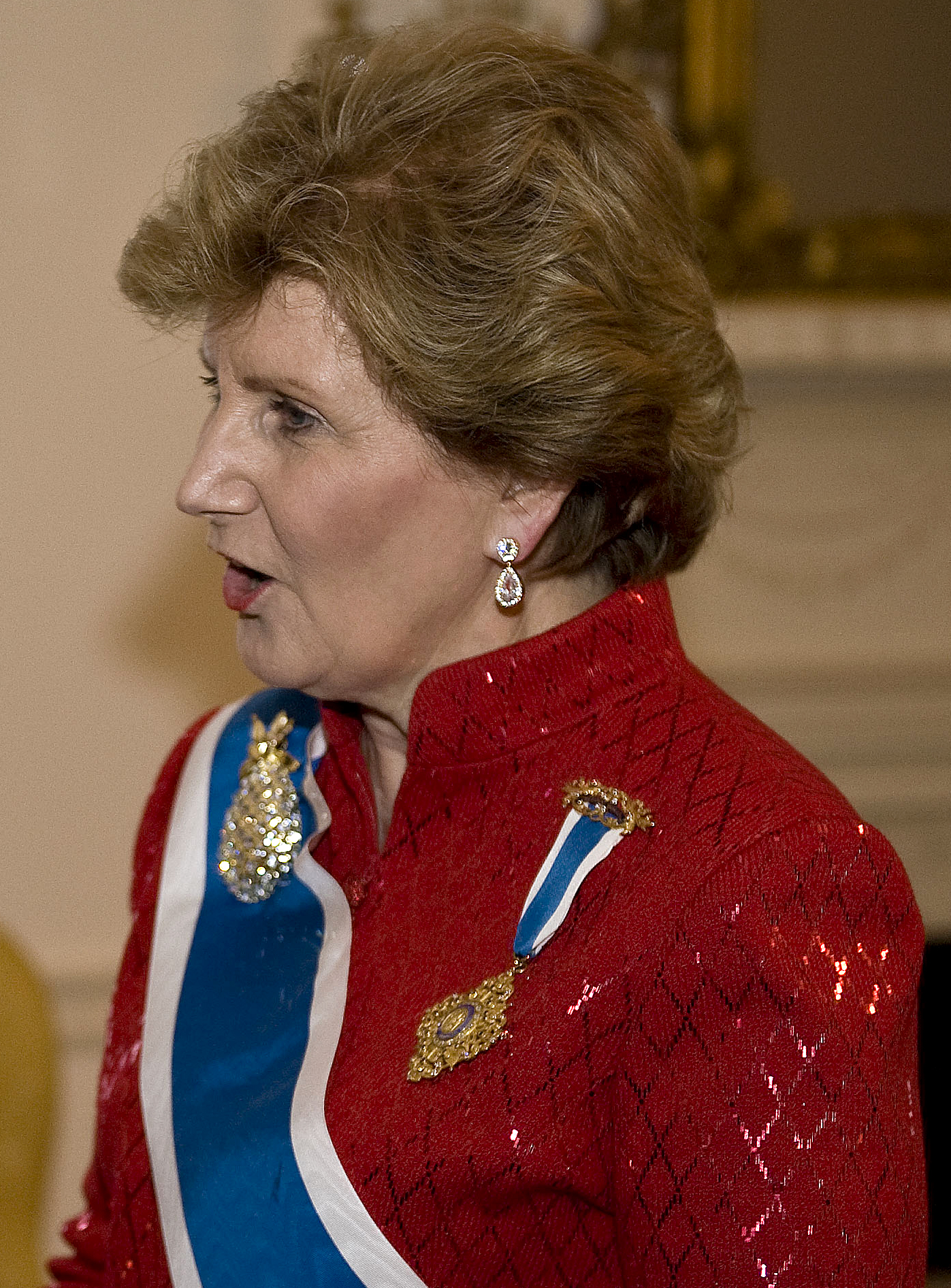
- Calvin in 2008

41st President General of the National Society Daughters of the American Revolution
- In office 2007–2010
- Preceded by: Presley Merritt Wagoner
- Succeeded by: Merry Ann Thompson Wright

Personal details
- Born: Visalia, California, U.S.
- Spouse: Jerry Calvin
- Children: 2
- Education: College of the Sequoias
- Occupation: secretary, businesswoman

Linda Gist Calvin is an American businesswoman who served as the 41st president general of the National Society Daughters of the American Revolution.

== Early life and education ==
Calvin was born and raised in Visalia, California. She attended College of the Sequoias and completed the business curriculum at Central Valley School of Business.

== Career ==
Calvin was the executive secretary to the director of human resources and labor relations at Schenley Industries. She is the president and managing partner of multiple family-owned businesses.

=== Daughters of the American Revolution ===
Calvin is the third generation of her family to join the Daughters of the American Revolution. Her mother, Peggy Gist, and her sisters, Barbara Gist Jaggers and Carol Gist Reeder, were also members. She served as a chapter regent and as Director of California District V. She and her sisters served as pages at the state and national level, were California Outstanding Juniors, and served as National Chairwomen of the Guest Hospitality Committee.

From 2000 to 2002, she served as the State Regent of California. From 2004 to 2007, she served as Recording Secretary General. From 2007 to 2010, she served as president general.

On July 11, 2008, she hosted Robert M. Gates, the United States Secretary of Defense, at the national society's National Defense Night during their Continental Congress at DAR Constitution Hall in Washington, D.C.

As president general, she was a proponent of celebrating Constitution Week. She attended the Missouri State Society Daughters of the American Revolution 110th State Conference in April 2009 in Jefferson City. In May 2009, she attended the Oklahoma Society Daughters of the American Revolution's 100th anniversary celebration at their state conference in Midwest City.

== Personal life ==
Calvin is married to Jerry Calvin, with whom she has two sons. She is a Pentecostal Christian and attends Calvary Chapel Church of Visalia.

She is a member of the National Society of the Dames of the Court of Honor, First Families of Tennessee, the National Assistance League, and the National Gavel Society.
