= Michael Goddard =

Australian academic

Mike Goddard
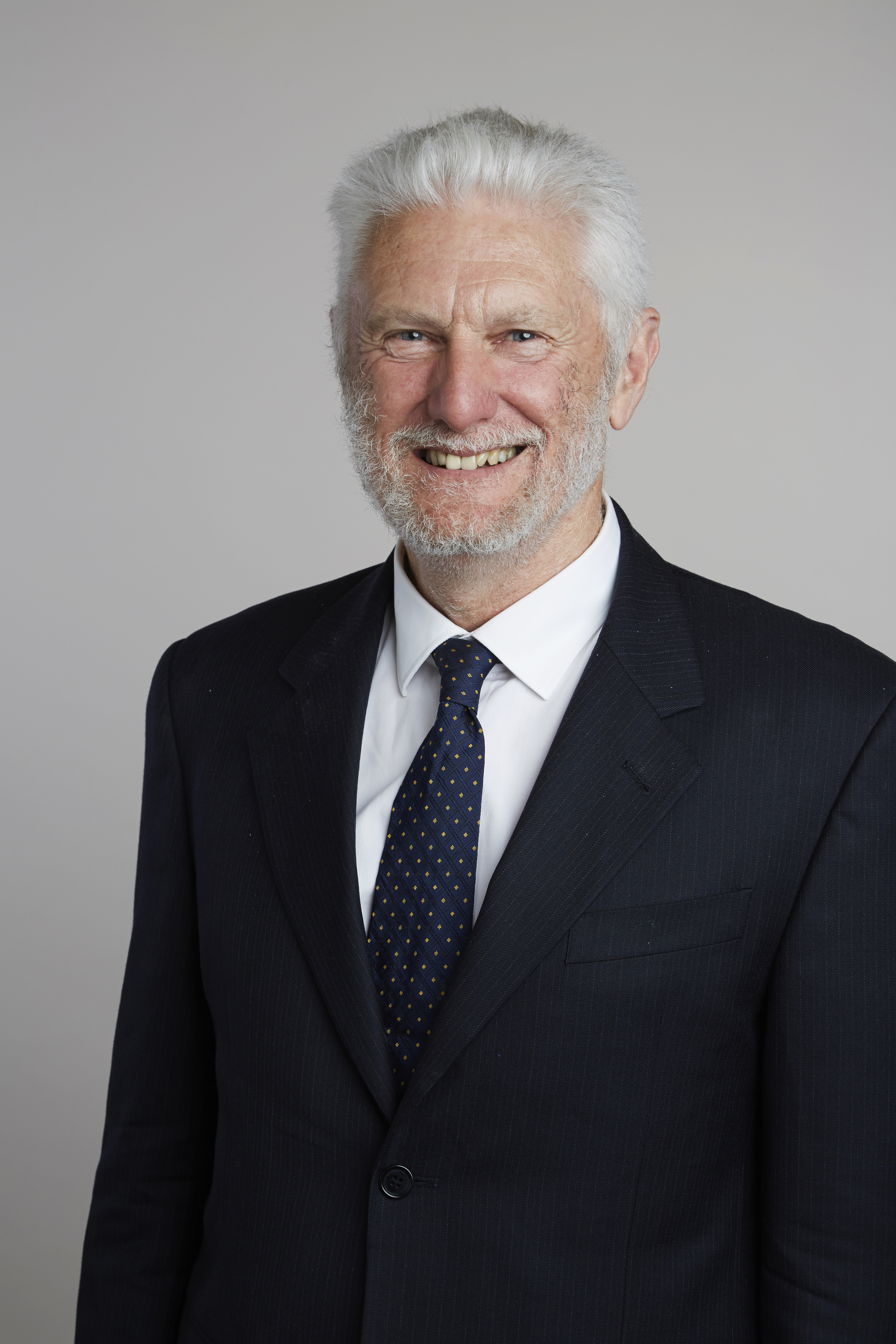
- Michael Goddard in 2015, portrait via the Royal Society
- Born: Michael Edward Goddard
- Education: University of Melbourne (BVSc(Hons), PhD)
- Awards: FAA (2011); FAAABG (2013); FRS (2015)
- Scientific career
- Fields: Genetics; Animal breeding
- Workplaces: University of Melbourne; James Cook University; University of Guelph; University of New England
- Thesis: Development of a breeding programme for guide dogs (1979)
- Website: findanexpert.unimelb.edu.au/display/person3714

Michael Edward "Mike" Goddard FAA FRS is a professorial fellow in animal genetics at the University of Melbourne, Australia.

== Education ==
Goddard was educated at the University of Melbourne where he was awarded Bachelor of Veterinary Science (BVSc) and PhD degrees.

== Awards and honours ==
Goddard was elected a Fellow of the Australian Academy of Science (FAA) in 2011.

He was elected a Fellow of the Royal Society (FRS) in 2015. His certificate of election reads:

Michael Goddard is distinguished for his research into quantitative genetics and the genetic improvement of livestock, in particular by incorporation of molecular genetic data. He co-proposed and developed 'genomic selection' in which dense molecular markers are fitted to quantitative data by using linkage disequilibrium with QTL, thereby enabling more accurate selection decisions, including among animals without phenotypic records. Within a decade, it is being used world wide in animal improvement programmes and has potential in plant breeding and prediction of risk of genetic disease in humans. Goddard has made other major contributions to understanding the genetic basis of quantitative genetic variation, showing that common SNPs can collectively account for much of the heritability, and to inferences on population history.

In 2018 he won the John J. Carty Award for the Advancement of Science.

== Selected publications ==
- Goddard, M. E.; Whitelaw, E. (2014). "The use of epigenetic phenomena for the improvement of sheep and cattle". Frontiers in Genetics. 5: 247. doi:10.3389/fgene.2014.00247. PMC 4139735. PMID 25191337.
- Goddard, M. E.; Hayes, B. J. (2009). "Mapping genes for complex traits in domestic animals and their use in breeding programmes". Nature Reviews Genetics. 10 (6): 381–391. doi:10.1038/nrg2575. PMID 19448663. S2CID 2111050.
- Speliotes, E. K.; Willer, C. J.; Berndt, S. I.; Monda, K. L.; Thorleifsson, G; Jackson, A. U.; Lango Allen, H; Lindgren, C. M.; Luan, J; Mägi, R; Randall, J. C.; Vedantam, S; Winkler, T. W.; Qi, L; Workalemahu, T; Heid, I. M.; Steinthorsdottir, V; Stringham, H. M.; Weedon, M. N.; Wheeler, E; Wood, A. R.; Ferreira, T; Weyant, R. J.; Segrè, A. V.; Estrada, K; Liang, L; Nemesh, J; Park, J. H.; Gustafsson, S; et al. (2010). "Association analyses of 249,796 individuals reveal 18 new loci associated with body mass index". Nature Genetics. 42 (11): 937–48. doi:10.1038/ng.686. PMC 3014648. PMID 20935630.
- Yang, J; Benyamin, B; McEvoy, B. P.; Gordon, S; Henders, A. K.; Nyholt, D. R.; Madden, P. A.; Heath, A. C.; Martin, N. G.; Montgomery, G. W.; Goddard, M. E.; Visscher, P. M. (2010). "Common SNPs explain a large proportion of the heritability for human height". Nature Genetics. 42 (7): 565–9. doi:10.1038/ng.608. PMC 3232052. PMID 20562875.
- Lango Allen, H.; Estrada, K.; Lettre, G.; Berndt, S. I.; Weedon, M. N.; Rivadeneira, F.; Willer, C. J.; Jackson, A. U.; Vedantam, S.; Raychaudhuri, S.; Ferreira, T.; Wood, A. R.; Weyant, R. J.; Segrè, A. V.; Speliotes, E. K.; Wheeler, E.; Soranzo, N.; Park, J. H.; Yang, J.; Gudbjartsson, D.; Heard-Costa, N. L.; Randall, J. C.; Qi, L.; Vernon Smith, A.; Mägi, R.; Pastinen, T.; Liang, L.; Heid, I. M.; Luan, J. A.; et al. (2010). "Hundreds of variants clustered in genomic loci and biological pathways affect human height". Nature. 467 (7317): 832–838. Bibcode:2010Natur.467..832L. doi:10.1038/nature09410. PMC 2955183. PMID 20881960.
- Yang, J; Lee, S. H.; Goddard, M. E.; Visscher, P. M. (2011). "GCTA: A tool for genome-wide complex trait analysis". The American Journal of Human Genetics. 88 (1): 76–82. doi:10.1016/j.ajhg.2010.11.011. PMC 3014363. PMID 21167468.
- Hayes, B. J.; Bowman, P. J.; Chamberlain, A. J.; Goddard, M. E. (2009). "Invited review: Genomic selection in dairy cattle: Progress and challenges". Journal of Dairy Science. 92 (2): 433–43. doi:10.3168/jds.2008-1646. PMID 19164653.
- Meuwissen, T. H.; Hayes, B. J.; Goddard, M. E. (2001). "Prediction of total genetic value using genome-wide dense marker maps". Genetics. 157 (4): 1819–29. doi:10.1093/genetics/157.4.1819. PMC 1461589. PMID 11290733.
