= Daughters of the King =

Anglican lay religious order

The Order of the Daughters of the King is an Anglican lay religious order for women founded in New York City in 1885. The Order of the Daughters of the King is ecumenical in nature, having members from a number of Christian denominations, especially those of the Anglican/Episcopal, Evangelical-Lutheran, and Roman Catholic traditions.

It is a sister organization to the Brotherhood of St. Andrew, a comparable men's organization affiliated with the Episcopal Church. Its constitution was said to be a close copy of that of the Brotherhood.

In 2012, the order had over 25,000 members from the Anglican/Episcopal, Evangelical-Lutheran and Roman Catholic churches.

== History ==
The order was founded in 1885 by Margaret J. Franklin and her Bible study class at the Church of the Holy Sepulcher in New York. It is considered "an order rather than an organization" because its members commit to a Rule of Life, which includes a Rule of Prayer and a Rule of Service.

There were 5,000 members as of 1923 and its headquarters were at 84 Bible House, New York City.

The order marked its quasquicentennial or 125 years of existence in 2010.

== Membership and organization ==
The order was originally only open to female members of the Episcopal Church. That rule has since changed to also allow "laywomen...of churches in communion with the Episcopal Church or of churches who are in the Historic Episcopate".

The order has chapters both in the United States and in Augsburg, Germany, Rome, Italy, and Mostoles, Brazil, Cuba, Mexico, Spain.

Members take lifelong vows to follow a "Rule of Life", including a "Rule of Prayer" and a "Rule of Service". Members also commit to praying daily for their clergy and offering assistance in building up the spiritual life of the parish.

=== Notable members ===
- Elizabeth Fry Page
- Merry Ann Thompson Wright

== Symbols ==
The order's emblem is a modified Greek cross inscribed with FHS, meaning “For His Sake”; the order's watchword is Magnanimiter Crucem Sustine, meaning “With heart, mind and spirit uphold and bear the cross".

== Motto ==
"For His Sake...
I am but one, but I am one.
I cannot do everything, but I can do something.
What I can do, I ought to do.
What I ought to do, by the grace of God I will do.
Lord, what will you have me do?"
