= Florence Hardeman =

American violinist

- Born: October 26, 1886; Covington, Kentucky, U.S.
- Died: January 15, 1972 (aged 85); Woodstock, New York, U.S.
- Other name: Florence Hardeman Heckman
- Occupation: Violinist
- Relatives: Mary Florence Taney (aunt)

Florence E. Hardeman Heckman (October 26, 1886 – January 15, 1972) was an American violinist who toured the United States with John Philip Sousa's Marine Band, and accompanied Sarah Bernhardt and Ernestine Schumann-Heink.

== Early life and education ==
Hardeman was born in Covington, Kentucky, the daughter of Thomas Whyte Hardeman and Elizabeth Taney Hardeman. Her aunt Mary Florence Taney was a prominent Kentucky clubwoman and writer.

Hardeman graduated from LaSalette Academy in Kentucky in 1902, and earned a degree from the Cincinnati College of Music in 1908. Before World War I she also studied in Europe with Leopold Auer, and in New York with Arrigo Serato. She was the first music student supported by the American Criterion Society.

== Career ==
Hardeman debuted as a violin soloist with the Cincinnati Symphony Orchestra, and toured with Sousa's Marine Band for several years. She played an Amati violin once owned by Ole Bull, and accompanied Sarah Bernhardt on her American tour. In the 1920s, she accompanied contralto Ernestine Schumann-Heink on tour and on radio broadcasts. In 1931, she gave a recital at New York's Town Hall venue, and was a soloist at a performance of the New York Matinee Musicale, marking George Washington's bicentennial. In the 1940s she played in a trio with Vladimir Padwa and Engelbert Röntgen.

== Personal life ==
Hardeman married artist and art professor Albert William Heckman in 1922. Her husband died in 1971, and she died in 1972, at the age of 85, in Woodstock, New York.
