= Robert H. Burris =

American biochemist (1914–2010)

- Born: April 13, 1914; Brookings, South Dakota, U.S.
- Died: May 11, 2010 (aged 96)
- Education: South Dakota State University
- Known for: Enzyme mechanisms in relation to Nitrogen fixation
- Awards: National Medal of Science (1979); John J. Carty Award (1984); Wolf Prize in Agriculture (1985)
- Scientific career
- Fields: Biochemistry
- Workplaces: University of Wisconsin-Madison

Robert H. Burris (April 13, 1914 – May 11, 2010) was a professor in the Biochemistry Department at the University of Wisconsin-Madison. He was elected to the National Academy of Sciences in 1961. Research in Burris's lab focused on enzyme reaction mechanisms, and he made significant contributions to our knowledge of nitrogen fixation.

== Education ==
Born in Brookings, South Dakota, Burris earned his B.S. degree in chemistry at South Dakota State University in 1936 and his Ph.D. from the University of Wisconsin-Madison in 1940.

== Career ==
He did postdoctoral research with Harold Urey at Columbia University, and later moved back to Madison, eventually becoming a professor in the biochemistry department. He was chairman of the department from 1958 to 1970. He retired from active research in 1984, having trained more than 70 doctoral research students.

He died in 2010 aged 96.

== Awards and distinctions ==
- 1961 – Elected to the National Academy of Sciences
- 1975 – Fellow of the American Academy of Arts and Sciences
- 1979 – Member of the American Philosophical Society
- 1979 – National Medal of Science
- 1984 – John J. Carty Award of the National Academy of Sciences in agricultural science
- 1985 – Wolf Prize in Agriculture
- 1989 – Kenneth A. Spencer Award for Meritorious Achievement in Agricultural and Food Chemistry
- Recognized as a Pioneer Member of the American Society of Plant Biologists.
