= Brotherhood of St. Andrew =

International Christian organization

- Abbreviation: BSA
- Formation: November 30, 1883; 142 years ago
- Type: Anglican fraternal service organization
- Founder: James Lawrence Houghteling
- Website: brothersandrew.net

The Brotherhood of St. Andrew is an international lay Christian religious organization with historical roots in the Episcopal Church in the United States of America.

The objectives of the organization focus on prayer, Bible study and service to the community with an emphasis on evangelism through fraternal outreach and "the spread of Christ's Kingdom among men."

== History ==
The Brotherhood was first organised on St. Andrew's Day, 30 November 1883, as a prayer and Bible study group at St. James Church in Chicago. Initially led by James Lawrence Houghteling, a Yale graduate, local YMCA President, and son of a prominent Chicago business family, the organization grew rapidly. Its mission (the average age of the dozen founding members was about 17 years old) was similar to the older YMCA, and would be similar to Mott's Student Volunteer Movement (1888) and World Student Christian Federation (1895) – in that all sought to evangelize the laity by the laity. By 1887, the Brotherhood had 115 chapters and a total membership of more than two thousand men and boys. By a decade later, chapters had been added in England, Japan and China.

By 1906, two years after Robert Hallowell Gardener had succeeded Houghteling as President, the BSA had grown to about 17,000 young men and boys in more than 1200 brotherhoods, with the American brotherhoods served by four (soon to be five) traveling secretaries. The organization was incorporated by an Act of the United States Congress and signed by President Theodore Roosevelt on May 30, 1908. That Act states, “The sole object of said corporation shall be the spread of Christ’s Kingdom among men”.

== Current activities ==
Operationally independent, but a similar organization was formed in the Scottish Episcopal Church. Active chapters of the Brotherhood exist in Anglican provinces of Australia, Canada, Brazil, Korea, and Japan.

Daughters of the King is a sister lay Anglican religious organization to the Brotherhood affiliated with the Episcopal Church.

Today, the organization continues its mission to bring others closer to Christ through regular study of the Scriptures (Bible) and bring others to the Church. Many Episcopalian chapters perform charitable works in their communities, raising funds and supplies for charitable organizations as part of Church outreach and aiding members and their families within the community with prayer and support. Additionally, chapters may hold events to raise funds and increase outreach for their parent churches.
