= Franklin Medal =

American science award

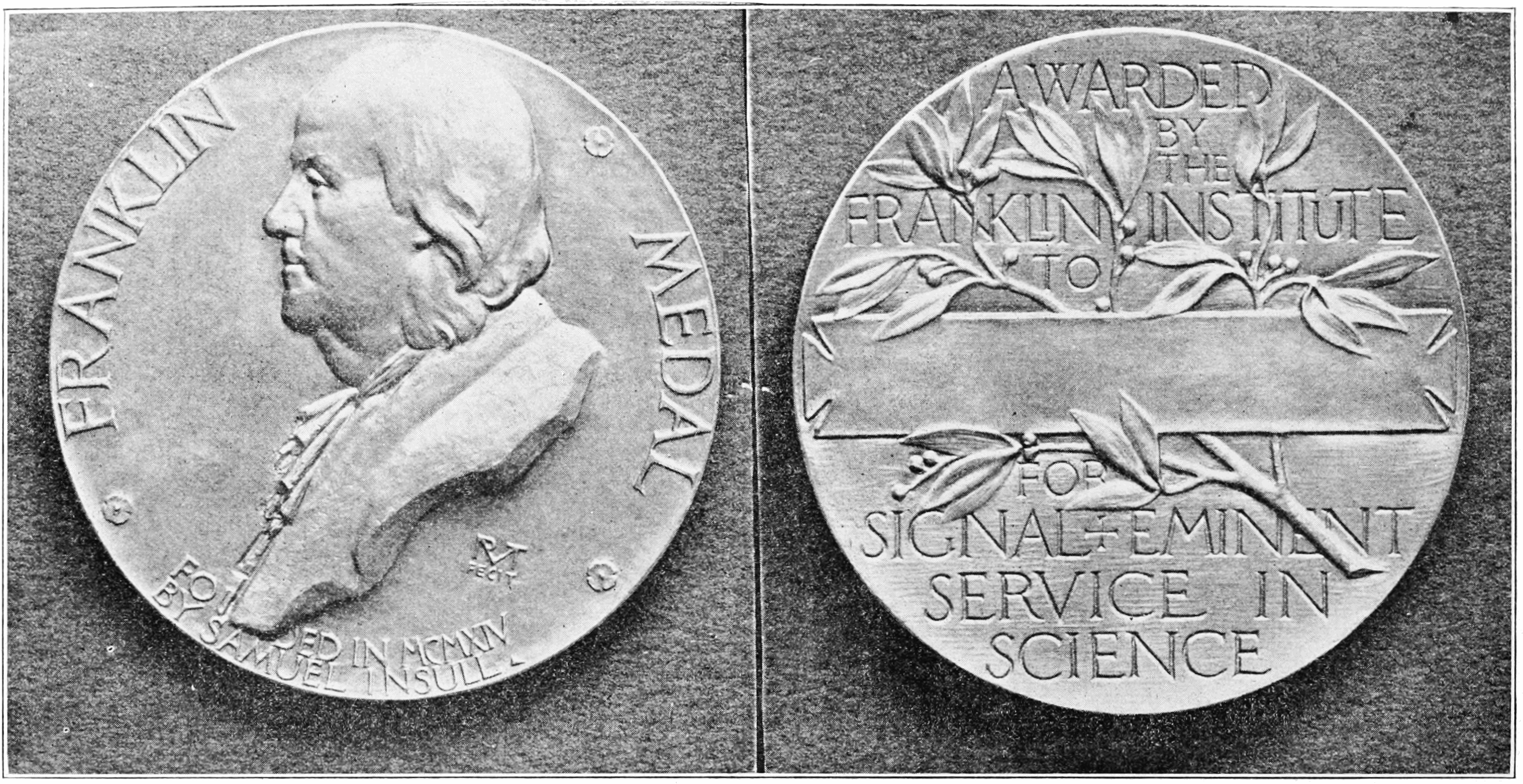
The Franklin Medal, "founded in 1914 by Samuel Insull … awarded by the Franklin Institute for signal and eminent service in science"

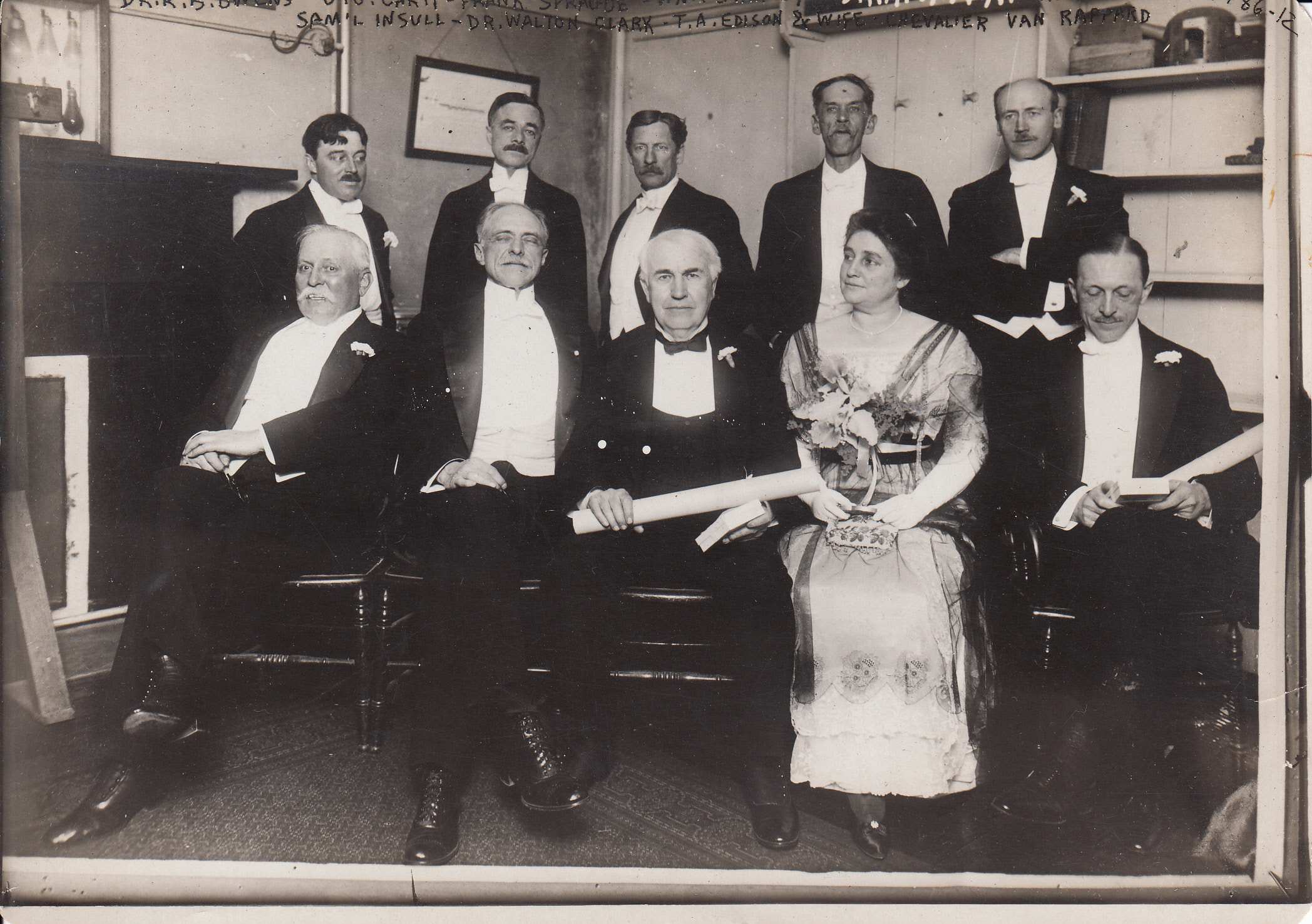
Presentation of the first Franklin Medal in Philadelphia on May 19, 1915. Front row: Samuel Insull, Walton Clark, recipient Thomas Edison and his wife Mina Miller, Chevalier Van Rappard, accepting the award for Heike Kamerlingh Onnes. Back row: Robert Bowie Owens, John J. Carty, Frank J. Sprague, William Stanley, R. Tait McKenzie.

The Franklin Medal was a science award presented from 1915 until 1997 by the Franklin Institute located in Philadelphia, Pennsylvania, U.S. It was founded in 1914 by innovator Samuel Insull, and it was the most prestigious of the various awards presented by the Franklin Institute. Together with the other eight historical awards, it was merged into the Benjamin Franklin Medal, initiated in 1998.

== Laureates ==
Recipients are listed in a database on The Franklin Institute website.

| Year | Country | Recipient | Discipline | Notes |
|---|---|---|---|---|
| 1915 | United States | Thomas Edison | Engineering | |
| 1915 | Netherlands | Heike Kamerlingh Onnes | Physics | |
| 1916 | United States | John J. Carty | Engineering | |
| 1916 | United States | Theodore William Richards | Chemistry | |
| 1917 | Netherlands | Hendrik Lorentz | Physics | |
| 1917 | United States | David W. Taylor | Engineering | |
| 1918 | Italy | Guglielmo Marconi | Engineering | |
| 1918 | United States | Thomas Corwin Mendenhall | Physics | |
| 1919 | Great Britain | James Dewar | Physics | |
| 1919 | United States | George Owen Squier | Engineering | |
| 1920 | Sweden | Svante Arrhenius | Chemistry | |
| 1920 | Great Britain | Charles Algernon Parsons | Engineering | |
| 1921 | France | Charles Fabry | Physics | |
| 1921 | United States | Frank J. Sprague | Engineering | |
| 1921 | Poland | Ralph Modjeski | Engineering | |
| 1922 | Great Britain | J. J. Thomson | Physics | |
| 1923 | France | Gustave-Auguste Ferrié | Engineering/Computer and Cognitive Science | |
| 1923 | United States | Albert A. Michelson | Physics | |
| 1924 | Great Britain | Ernest Rutherford | Chemistry | |
| 1924 | United States | Edward Weston | Engineering | |
| 1925 | United States | Elihu Thomson | Engineering | |
| 1925 | Netherlands | Pieter Zeeman | Physics | |
| 1926 | Denmark | Niels Bohr | Physics | |
| 1926 | United States | Samuel Rea | Engineering | |
| 1927 | United States | George Ellery Hale | Physics | |
| 1927 | Germany | Max Planck | Physics | |
| 1928 | United States | Charles F. Brush | Engineering | |
| 1928 | Germany | Walther Nernst | Chemistry | |
| 1929 | United States | Emile Berliner | Engineering | |
| 1929 | Great Britain | Charles Thomson Rees Wilson | Physics | |
| 1930 | Great Britain | William Henry Bragg | Physics | |
| 1930 | United States | John Frank Stevens | Engineering | |
| 1931 | Great Britain | James Hopwood Jeans | Physics | |
| 1931 | United States | Willis R. Whitney | Engineering | |
| 1932 | Germany | Philipp Lenard | Physics | |
| 1932 | United States | Ambrose Swasey | Engineering | |
| 1933 | France | Paul Sabatier | Chemistry | |
| 1933 | United States | Orville Wright | Engineering | |
| 1934 | United States | Irving Langmuir | Chemistry | |
| 1934 | United States | Henry Norris Russell | Physics | |
| 1935 | Switzerland (Note: Einstein acquired Swiss citizenship in 1901 and held it for the rest of his life. A German until shortly before emigrating to the United States and becoming affiliated with the Institute for Advanced Study at Princeton in 1933, he surrendered his passport and formally renounced his German citizenship on March 28 of that year, in response to Adolf Hitler's rise to power. In 1935, he decided to remain in the U.S. permanently and became an American citizen in 1940.) | Albert Einstein | Physics | |
| 1935 | Great Britain | John Ambrose Fleming | Engineering | |
| 1936 | United States | Frank B. Jewett | Engineering | |
| 1936 | United States | Charles F. Kettering | Engineering | |
| 1937 | United States | Peter Debye | Chemistry | |
| 1937 | United States | Robert Andrews Millikan | Physics | |
| 1938 | United States | William F. Durand | Engineering | |
| 1938 | United States | Charles A. Kraus | Chemistry | |
| 1939 | United States | Edwin Hubble | Physics | |
| 1939 | Belgium | Albert Sauveur | Engineering | |
| 1940 | Belgium | Leo Baekeland | Engineering | |
| 1940 | United States | Arthur Compton | Physics | |
| 1941 | United States | Edwin H. Armstrong | Engineering | |
| 1941 | India | C. V. Raman | Physics | |
| 1942 | United States | Jerome Clarke Hunsaker | Engineering | |
| 1942 | United States | Paul Dyer Merica | Engineering | |
| 1943 | United States | G. W. Pierce | Engineering | |
| 1943 | United States | Harold Urey | Physics | |
| 1944 | United States | William D. Coolidge | Engineering | |
| 1944 | Soviet Union | Peter Kapitza | Physics | |
| 1945 | United States | Harlow Shapley | Physics | |
| 1946 | United States | Henry Clapp Sherman | Life Science | |
| 1946 | Great Britain | Henry Tizard | Engineering | |
| 1946 | United States | Enrico Fermi | Physics | |
| 1947 | Great Britain | Robert Robinson | Chemistry | |
| 1948 | United States | Wendell Meredith Stanley | Life Science | |
| 1948 | United States | Theodore von Kármán | Engineering | |
| 1949 | Sweden | Theodor Svedberg | Life Science | |
| 1950 | United States | Eugene Wigner | Physics | |
| 1951 | Great Britain | James Chadwick | Physics | |
| 1952 | Austria | Wolfgang Pauli | Physics | |
| 1953 | United States | William Francis Gibbs | Engineering | |
| 1954 | Great Britain | Kenneth Mees | Engineering | |
| 1955 | Sweden | Arne Tiselius | Life Science | |
| 1956 | Great Britain | Frank Whittle | Engineering | |
| 1957 | Great Britain | Hugh Stott Taylor | Chemistry | |
| 1958 | United States | Donald Wills Douglas | Engineering | |
| 1959 | United States | Hans Bethe | Physics | |
| 1960 | United States | Roger Adams | Engineering | |
| 1961 | United States | Detlev Bronk | Life Science | |
| 1962 | Great Britain | G. I. Taylor | Life Science | |
| 1963 | United States | Glenn T. Seaborg | Physics | |
| 1964 | United States | Gregory Breit | Physics | |
| 1965 | United States | Frederick Seitz | Engineering | |
| 1966 | United States | Britton Chance | Life Science | |
| 1967 | United States | Murray Gell-Mann | Physics | |
| 1968 | United States | Marshall Warren Nirenberg | Life Science | |
| 1969 | United States | John Archibald Wheeler | Physics | |
| 1970 | Germany | Wolfgang K. H. Panofsky | Physics | |
| 1971 | Sweden | Hannes Alfvén | Physics | |
| 1972 | United States | George Kistiakowsky | Chemistry | |
| 1973 | United States | Theodosius Dobzhansky | Life Science | |
| 1974 | Soviet Union | Nikolay Bogolyubov | Physics | |
| 1975 | United States | John Bardeen | Physics | |
| 1976 | United States | Mahlon Hoagland | Life Science | |
| 1977 | United States | Cyril M. Harris | Engineering | |
| 1978 | United States | Elias James Corey | Chemistry | |
| 1979 | Great Britain | G. Evelyn Hutchinson | Life Science | |
| 1980 | United States | Avram Goldstein | Life Science | |
| 1980 | United States | Lyman Spitzer | Physics | |
| 1981 | Great Britain | Stephen Hawking | Physics | |
| 1982 | Argentina | César Milstein | Life Science | |
| 1982 | United States | Kenneth G. Wilson | Physics | |
| 1984 | United States | Verner E. Suomi | Engineering | |
| 1985 | United States | George C. Pimentel | Physics | |
| 1986 | United States | Benoît Mandelbrot | Physics | |
| 1987 | United States | Stanley Cohen | Life Science | |
| 1988 | United States | Donald Knuth | Computer and Cognitive Science | |
| 1990 | Great Britain | Hugh Huxley | Life Science | |
| 1990 | United States | David Turnbull | Physics | |
| 1992 | United States | Frederick Reines | Physics | |
| 1995 | Netherlands | Gerard 't Hooft | Physics | |
| 1996 | United States | Richard Smalley | Chemistry | |
| 1997 | Italy | Mario Capecchi | Life Science | |
