= Brigadier General George P. Scriven House =

Mansion in Washington, D.C.

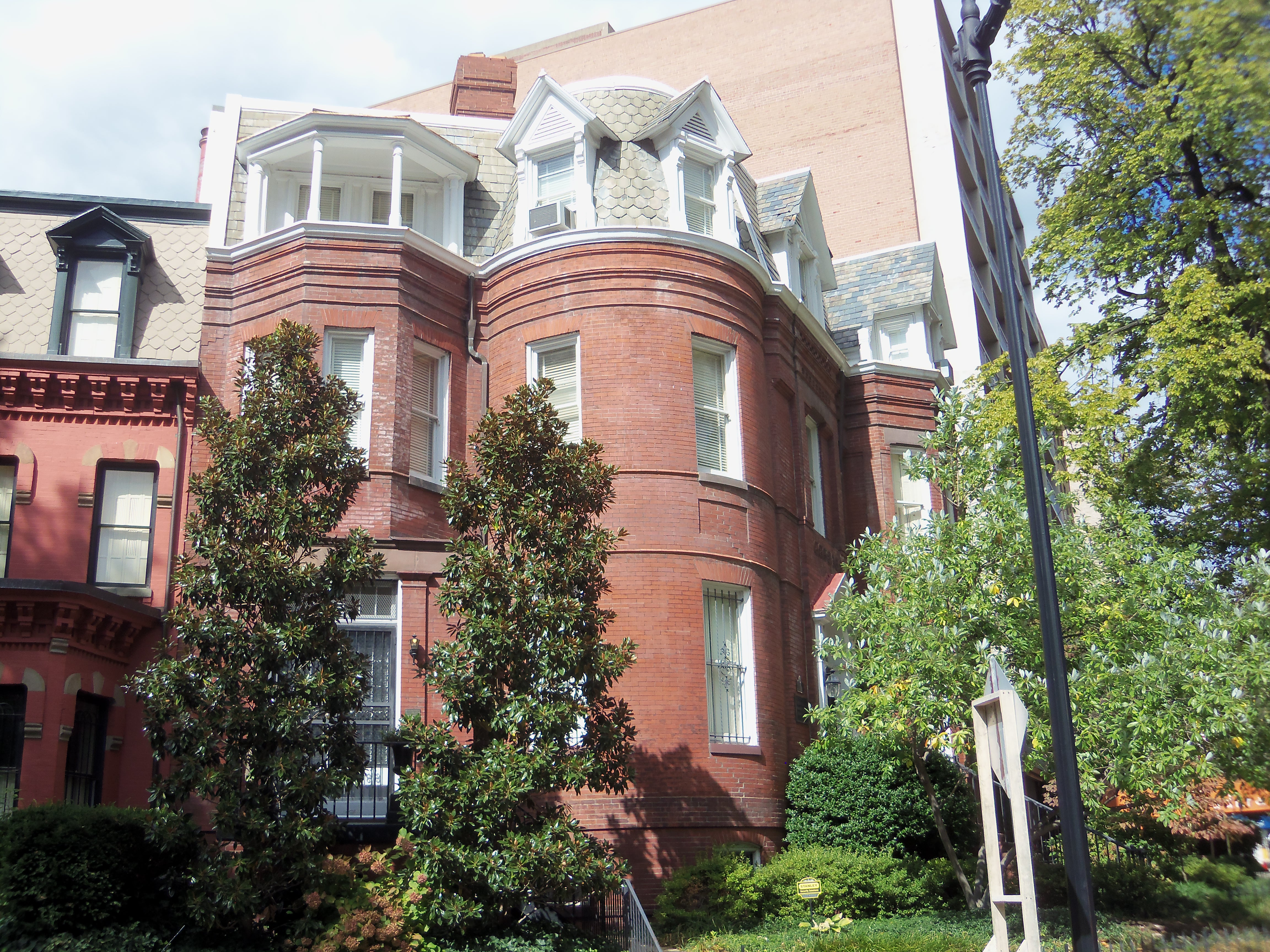
- The house in 2013.

- Location within the United States
- 38.90749°N 77.04585°W
- Location: 1300 New Hampshire Avenue; Washington, D.C., U.S.

History
- Built: 1884

Site notes
- Architect: George Whiting
- Architectural style: Victorian
- Owner: George P. Scriven (previously); National Society Colonial Dames XVII Century

U.S. National Register of Historic Places
- Designated: August 27, 2013
- Reference no.: 13000620

The Brigadier General George P. Scriven House is a historic Victorian mansion in Washington, D.C. It was formerly the home of Brigadier General George P. Scriven, the Chief Signal Officer of the United States Army. Since 1957, it has served as the national headquarters for the National Society Colonial Dames XVII Century. The house was listed on the National Register of Historic Places on August 27, 2013.

== History ==
The mansion was built as a townhouse in Dupont Circle by the architect George Whiting in 1884. It includes twenty-three rooms and five bathrooms.

Brigadier General George P. Scriven was the third owner of the house. He and first wife, Bertha Bragg Scriven, purchased the property in 1893 and lived there with their two daughters, Elizabeth and Katherine, there. In 1901, Scriven hired the architect Henry Simpson and the builder Charles A. Langley to build an addition at the north side of the house. The addition included a two-story ballroom for entertaining. Following Bertha's death in 1914, Scriven married Elizabeth McQuade in 1915. They remained in the house until 1918, when they began leasing the property. Scriven sold the home in 1928.

The house later belonged to the Veterans of Foreign Wars.

On May 15, 1957, the house was purchased by the National Society Colonial Dames XVII Century to serve as their national headquarters. It also houses the society's national library and archives.

It was added to the National Register of Historic Places on August 27, 2013.
