= National Society of the Dames of the Court of Honor =

Lineage society

- Founded: May 15, 1921
- Founder: Mary Florence Taney
- Founded at: Covington, Kentucky
- Type: Non-profit, lineage society
- Purpose: Historic preservation, education, patriotism
- President General: Brenda M. Hamilton
- Website: nsdch.org

The National Society of the Dames of the Court of Honor is a lineage society. Founded in 1921, the society accepts women who are lineal descendants from a commissioned officer of one or more early American wars between the 1607 and 1865. Membership is also extended to female descendants of Colonial governors who served between 1607 and 1775.

== History ==
The National Society of the Dames of the Court of Honor was founded by Mary Florence Taney, and thirteen associate members, in Covington, Kentucky, on May 15, 1921.

Membership is extended to women, at least sixteen years old, who are lineal descendants from a commissioned officer of one or more early American wars between the 1607 and 1865, including the Colonial Wars, the American Revolutionary War, the War of 1812, the Mexican–American War, and the American Civil War. Membership is also extended to women who descend from a Colonial Governor who served in the Colonial Period of 1607 to 1775.

The society was incorporated in Ohio in 1928. During World War II, the national society was inactive. Following the war, it was reorganized by Mrs. Kirby-Smith Anderson on May 15, 1946, in Atlanta.

In May 1965, the Virginia Society of the Dames of the Court of Honor held a meeting, in honor of Mary Florence Taney, at the home of Mrs. Samuel Thorne Patterson in Danville, Virginia.

In May 1982, the Virginia State Society held a founders day celebration in Altavista, Virginia, cohosted by Virginia State President Mrs. Paul E. Cocke and Mrs. Robert B. Carpenter Jr.

In 1985, it was registered as a nonprofit organization.

== Notable members ==
- Linda Gist Calvin, 41st president general of the Daughters of the American Revolution
- Mary Florence Taney, clubwoman, writer, and socialite
