= George P. Scriven =

United States Army general

George Percival Scriven
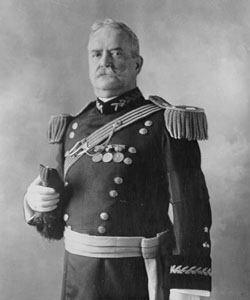
- Born: February 21, 1854; Philadelphia, Pennsylvania, U.S.
- Died: March 7, 1940 (aged 86); Southern Pines, North Carolina, U.S.
- Burial place: United States Military Academy Post Cemetery
- Spouses: Bertha Bragg; (m. 1891; died 1914); Elizabeth McQuade; (m. 1915; died 1968)
- Children: Katherine Colman (Marthinson)^{(b. 1893; died 1924)}; Cornelia Elizabeth Scriven^{(b. 1894; died 1965)}; Percival Rochester Scriven^{(b. 1898; died 1899)}
- Military career
- Allegiance: United States of America
- Branch: United States Army
- Service years: 1874–1917
- Rank: Brigadier General
- Commands: U.S. Signal Corps
- Awards: Silver Star (2); Spanish–American War; Philippine–American War; China Relief Expedition; Cuban Occupation; Mexican Expedition; Foreign Service (1917–1918); Grand Officer of the Crown of Italy (1918)

Chairman of the NACA
- In office April 23, 1915 – 1916
- President: Woodrow Wilson
- Preceded by: -
- Succeeded by: William F. Durand

George Percival Scriven (February 21, 1854 – March 7, 1940) was the seventh Chief Signal Officer of the United States Army (1913–1917). In this position he commanded the Aeronautical Division (1913–1914), and later the Aviation Section (1914–1917) of U.S. Signal Corps, the forerunner of the United States Air Force.

Scriven was first Chairman of the National Advisory Committee for Aeronautics (1915–1916), the forerunner of NASA.

== Military career ==
George Percival Scriven was born on February 21, 1854, in Philadelphia, Pennsylvania. He attended the University of Chicago for one year, studied civil engineering for two years at Rensselaer Polytechnic Institute, then enrolled at the United States Military Academy. Scriven graduated fifth in his class in 1878.

Scriven was commissioned a second Lieutenant on June 14, 1878, and served with the Eighth Infantry, then returned to teach modern languages at West Point. In 1885, Scriven was promoted to first lieutenant and assigned to the Third Artillery. Delegated to the Adjutant General's Office, in 1890, Scriven was placed on duty with the State Department within the Army's Signal Corps.

In 1894, Scriven was promoted to captain and directed to serve as military attaché in the U.S. legation in Mexico. Later that year, he was appointed as military attaché in Rome, Italy. In 1896, Secretary of War Daniel S. Lamont directed Maj. Gen. Alexander McDowell McCook (ret.), and Scriven to be the official US delegates to the coronation of Nicholas II of Russia. In April, 1897 Scriven requested to observe the Turkish army in their war with Greece. Where he was soon appointed military attaché to the US Embassy I'm Constantinople. In May 1898, Scriven was promoted to major. Later, in 1898, Scriven was named Chief Signal Officer of the Gulf during the Spanish–American War. He served in numerous military posts and roles over the next decade, including Chief Signal Officer and Military Secretary in Cuba in 1899; Chief Signal Officer as part of the China Relief Expedition from August to November 1900;

In 1902, Scriven, acting as Chief Signal Officer of the Army, contracted the Marconi's Wireless Telegraph Company for the September Long Island army navy maneuvers, setting up wireless telegraphy stations at Block Island, Gardiner's Island, and Army headquarters at Fort Trumbull, Connecticut. Scriven was Chief Signal Officer of the Department of the East from 1904 to 1909; and as Chief Signal Officer of the Philippines Division from 1909 to 1911. In January 1913, Colonel Scriven was promoted to brigadier general and appointed as the seventh Chief Signal Officer of the Army by President William Howard Taft. At the time of the appointment, it was noted that Scriven "has had a career of remarkable activity, having been attached at different times to three branches of the military service, and having seen service in all parts of the world and participated in the front of every campaign which has been waged since his graduation from the Military Academy ... "

He held the position of chief signal officer until 1917. During this period, Scriven was also appointed chairman of the newly formed National Advisory Committee for Aeronautics in 1915 and served until 1916.

In February 1917, after 42 years of service, Brigadier General Scriven retired from the Army. He was asked to continue service under the status of "active service in case of war." Accordingly, in September 1917 after the United States had entered World War I, Scriven was assigned to the embassy in Rome as military attaché by direct appointment of the Secretary of War and Secretary of State. While in Rome, he served as military advisor to the Italian army.

Scriven received multiple honors throughout his career, including recognition for gallantry in action against Chinese Boxer forces at Yang Tsun on August 6, 1900, and at Peking on August 14–15, 1900. He also received badges for his service during the Spanish–American War, the Philippines Invasion, the Army of Cuban Occupation, the China Relief Expedition, and the Mexican Expedition. In 1918, he was awarded the decoration of Grand Officer Crown of Italy for his service during World War I.

== George P. Scriven and Aviation in the United States ==
=== Aeronautical Division U.S. Army Signal Corps ===
Wilbur and Orville Wright's first successful airplane flight on December 17, 1903, at Kitty Hawk, North Carolina, generated tremendous public enthusiasm for aeronautics. Following this event, though, aviation pursuits in the United States centered on recreational exhibition meets, at the cost of serious aeronautical research. In research, the United States lagged far behind Europe, where many countries recognized the importance of concentrated research and continued development in the field of aeronautics. While national aeronautical libraries existed throughout the European continent by the turn of the twentieth century, university research in the United States "was virtually non-existent."

Additionally, the U.S. military delayed in taking aviation seriously as an increasingly important military field. Aviation's military applications were regarded as limited to reconnaissance and other passive support functions, and the federal government did not consider making significant military appropriations for aviation research. The first major advance in military aeronautics in the United States came on August 1, 1907, when the Chief Signal Officer of the Army announced the creation of an Aeronautical Division within the Army's Signal Corps, which had been created in 1891. Particularly well suited to promote the study of aeronautics, the Division was charged with responsibility for all issues related to "military ballooning, air machines, and all kindred subjects."

The Division was the first heavier-than-air military aviation organization in the world and the precursor to the United States Air Force. Led by Captain Charles deForest Chandler, a Signal Corps officer with interest in military aeronautics, the Division was established with three officers and ten enlisted men, all from the Signal Corps. It soon became clear that the newly formed Aeronautical Division was limited by both a lack of funding and inadequate staffing. In the Division's first year, the War Department submitted a request to Congress for a $200,000 appropriation for aeronautical equipment and instruction, but the item was struck from the final bill. The Board of Ordnance and Fortifications stepped in, appropriating enough funding for the War Department to purchase an airplane from A.M. Herring of New York, and another from the Wright Brothers. The first regular appropriation for aeronautics in the military services was not made until 1911, and while annual reports of the Chief Signal Officer repeatedly stated that funding was insufficient to keep pace with aeronautical development in other countries, appropriations granted by Congress remained small. Another major problem facing the Aeronautical Division was a lack of personnel within the Signal Corps devoted to aeronautics. Between 1908 and 1910, repeated attempts were made to secure legislation that would authorize a personnel increase, but none were successful.

These issues received more serious and focused discussion with the introduction of a bill to create an Aviation Corps within the Army. Introduced by Representative James Hay (Virginia) on February 11, 1913, the Hay Bill (H.R. 28728) ultimately failed to pass, but it succeeded in instigating serious and necessary discussion regarding the current and future state of aeronautics within the U.S. military. It was the first bill to propose separating aviation from the Signal Corps, and it engendered serious debate due to that provision. The House Committee on Military Affairs held lengthy hearings on the Hay Bill beginning on August 12, 1913. The bill was opposed both by the War Department and by most Signal Corps officers called to speak before the Committee. Among the most vocal were Acting Secretary of War Henry Breckinridge, General Billy Mitchell, and Chief Signal Officer Brigadier General Scriven, who had recently been promoted to his position.

These men welcomed the attention finally being paid to the issue of military aeronautics, but Scriven in particular believed strongly that it would be a mistake to remove aviation from the Signal Corps, because it had the technical information and machinery necessary to perform the work, as well as experienced personnel.

He noted the scientific progress made by the Corps and stated that such knowledge was more valuable to aviation than pure flying experience. Scriven argued that personnel numbers should be increased and that aviation should be assigned permanently to the Signal Corps.

In the fall of 1913, while the House Committee on Military Affairs continued with its consideration of the Hay Bill, Brigadier General Scriven continued his campaign to both promote aviation and to keep it within the Signal Corps. Scriven released a public statement on the topic in 1913. The New York Times published the piece, entitled "Asks Trained Men for Army Aviation; Head of the Signal Corps Appeals for a Strengthening of That Branch of the Service." Describing the statement as "in a way an appeal to Congress," the article noted that "it is rather bluntly stated that the flying situation in the United States viewed strictly from a military standpoint, is in a critical condition." Emphasizing that aerial navigation was on the verge of assuming significant consequence, Scriven stated" ... aviation, which may be considered a sport by the people of the country at large, is to the army a vital necessity. The time for serious effort in this new military science is at hand." Scriven, noting the situation as "critical," called for an increase in funding to support trained personnel for aeroplane and reconnaissance work. Acknowledging the efforts of the Signal Corps in compiling data and information on the strength of materials, the use of radio-telegraphy in aeronautics, and other topics, Scriven concluded that "the Signal Corps officials give the opinion that the work of aeronautics in the United States Army should be carried out along its present lines of development, and that the work should receive every reasonable aid and encouragement by Congress."

His outspoken views on aviation would establish the Signal Corps' policy in the crucial years before World War I. As a result of the hearings and the work of interested men including Scriven, several revisions were made to the Hay Bill in the following months. Finally, the House Military Affairs Committee substituted a new bill, H.R. 5304, which, instead of creating an aviation corps within the Army, established an Aviation Division within the Signal Corps, with 60 officers and 260 enlisted men. In presenting the bill to Congress, the Military Affairs Committee recommended a $300,000 appropriation for the Aviation Section, stating that while it would not try to place the Aviation Service on the same plane as those found in European countries, it would try to put U.S. aviation in a position to "enable it to keep up with the experiments being made in aviation." On July 12, 1914, the Senate Military Affairs Committee agreed, stating "If this branch of the military service is to be made effective every opportunity must be given for its development."

The bill passed on July 18, 1914. It created the Aviation Section of the Signal Corps, eliminating the Aeronautical Division, and with that major organization change also increased the budget and personnel numbers. In addition it provided for training of aviation students, additional pay for flying duty and payment of benefits to the widows of servicemen killed in the line of duty. As Chief Signal Officer of the Signal Corps, Scriven spent the following months working in support of the new Division. A Washington Post article published in September 1914 stated that he was "making every effort to improve and extend the aviation work of the military service and to perfect the organization of the aviation section of the Signal Corps in accordance with the act of July 18, last." Noting that the army "for the first time" had adequate organization for aviation work, the article stated that authorities including Scriven hoped "that they may do something to cover the ground lost by almost complete inaction for the last few years in the matter of mechanical flight."

A month later, the Post wrote that the "government has made tremendous strides in the improvement of its aeroplane arm of the military service."

Furthermore, the article noted that Scriven, along with Representative Hay, "deserve the lion's share of the credit for the fact that the aviation squadron is now a real and efficient engine of war. These two men, it was pointed out yesterday by the army officers, are the ones who made the long fight for the recognition of aviation as a necessity for the army." Although the creation of the Signal Corps' Aviation Division helped to advance the aviation program within the military, progress in support of concentrated aeronautical research was stalled. The primary issue remained the establishment of a central aeronautical research laboratory that could compete with those found throughout Europe. While the American public for the most part continued to view airplanes as a recreational fad, sentiment in favor of a research center was growing among a small group of scholars and military men, including Brigadier General Scriven.

=== The National Advisory Committee for Aeronautics ===
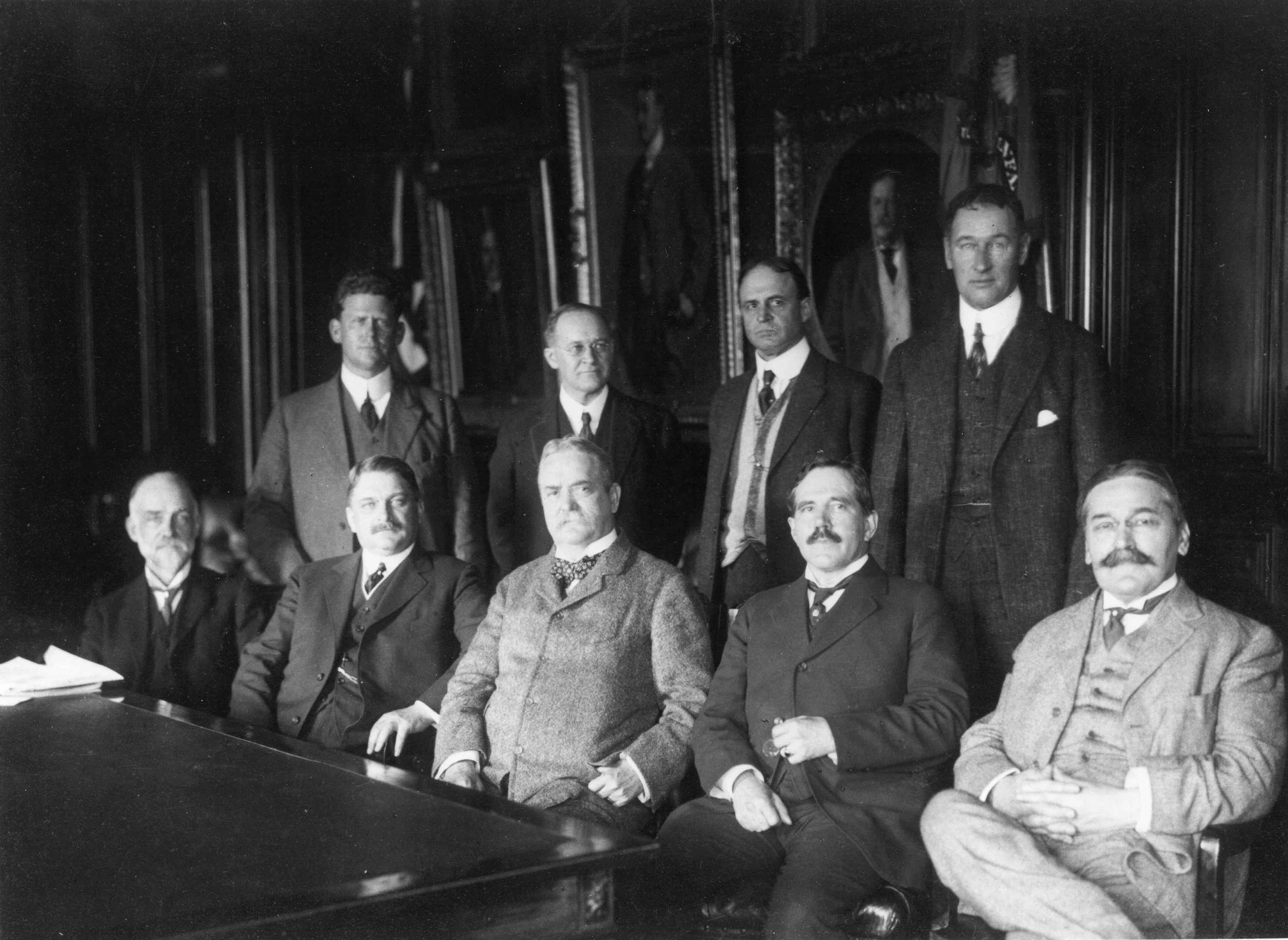
The first meeting of the NACA in 1915. Scriven is seated center

Charles Walcott, secretary of the Smithsonian Institution, supported a fact-finding tour abroad. The resulting report, published in 1914, "emphasized the galling disparity between European progress and American inertia."

The outbreak of war in Europe that same year further served as a catalyst for the creation of an American agency, as the technology employed in combat there emphasized the shortcomings of the American aviation program. In 1915, utilizing reports by American attachés and other observers, Brigadier General Scriven published a report on the new status of aviation in Europe. He noted that airplanes were not only used for information-gathering activities but also now conducted attacks on enemy personnel and material.

Walcott, Scriven, and other like-minded men pushed for legislative action to provide for an advisory committee for aeronautics that would concentrate on research. Finally, on March 3, 1915, Congress passed a Smithsonian-backed proposal to create such a committee. Thanks to a friendly House Committee on Naval Affairs, the enabling legislation for the National Advisory Committee of Aeronautics (NACA) was attached as a rider to a naval appropriation bill, and was easily approved as part of the larger legislation. The legislation gave the committee a $5,000 annual budget and authorized the U.S. President to appoint twelve members to the NACA's main committee. The committee was to include two members from the War Department, two from the Navy, one member each from the Smithsonian Institution, the Weather Bureau and the Bureau of Standards, and then five additional members "who shall be acquainted with the needs of aeronautical science, either civil or military, or skilled in aeronautical engineering or its applied sciences." The committee members were directed with the purpose "to supervise and direct the scientific study of the problems of flight, with a view to their practical solutions." On April 23, 1915, the main committee of the NACA met in the Office of the Secretary of War. The Committee chose Brigadier General Scriven to serve as the NACA's first Chairman. Aeronautical historian Michael Gorn states that the committee "chose well" as Scriven "brought a wealth of experience and know-how to the job. He applied his knowledge deftly, enabling the Army and the NACA to serve their mutual interests."

Scriven accomplished this by striking a bargain with the NACA committee, promising that if its members supported the Aviation Division's spending requests to Congress for training, aircraft purchases and a research center, that he would do his part to support an expanded NACA budget. He stated his belief that "nothing will better advance the cause of aeronautics in the United States than for this Advisory Committee to recommend and urge with all its authority the appropriations for the Army ..." The Committee's most significant work during Scriven's period as chairman was the promotion of an aeronautical research laboratory, which had been a primary goal of aviation experts for years. Scriven's proposal for a research laboratory was endorsed by the executive committee of the NACA at a meeting on October 14, 1915, and by the main committee the following day.

In 1916, he proposed for the following year's budget an $85,000 appropriation for the "equipment of a flying field together with aeroplanes and suitable testing gear" as well as a "well-equipped laboratory specially suited to the solving of those problems [in aeronautics] which are sure to develop ..."

On August 29, 1916, Congress appropriated $87,000, of which $53,580 was earmarked for the construction of a research laboratory. Scriven "shrewdly linked the NACA's need for land to the Army's need to find a home for its own aeronautical research center, a measure also approved by Congress."

He appointed a board of officers, including four members of the Signal Corps' Aviation Division, to review fifteen possible locations. The board ultimately chose a 1, 650-acre parcel of land in Elizabeth City County (now Hampton), Virginia, which the Army and the NACA agreed to share as the site of a future laboratory. While General Scriven served as Chairman of the NACA only for a short period in 1915 and 1916, "his brief period there proved to be pivotal." On June 11, 1920, the Langley Memorial Aeronautical Laboratory was formally dedicated and opened for research.

== Family life ==
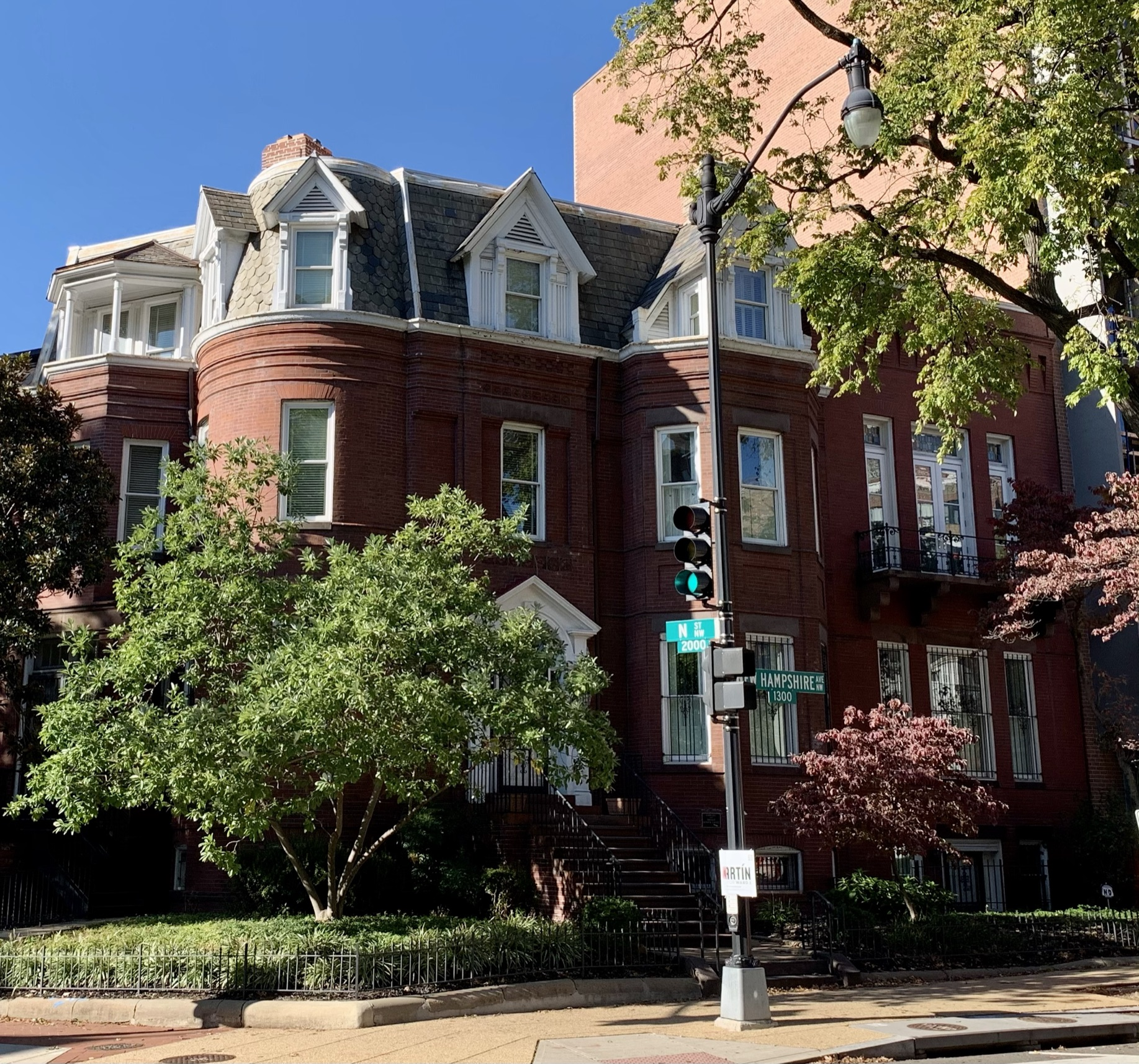
The Brigadier General George P. Scriven House in Washington, D.C.

George P. Scriven married Bertha Bragg on February 7, 1891. Mrs. Scriven was born on July 29, 1863, in Fond du Lac, Wisconsin, to Cornelia Coleman and Edward Stuyvesant Bragg. Union Brigadier General Bragg had become famous during the Civil War for his command of the 6th Infantry, which was known as the "Iron Brigade." George and Bertha Scriven had two daughters, Cornelia, born January 1892, and Katherine, born February 1893. Bertha Scriven died at the age of 50 on February 4, 1914, after an illness of several months, and was interred at Arlington National Cemetery.

The following year, on October 6, 1915, Scriven married Elizabeth McQuade (b. September 20, 1876, d. December 3, 1968) of Staten Island, New York. His daughter Betty Scriven was maid of honor, Brig. Gen. Hugh L. Scott, Chief of Staff of the U.S. Army, was best man. While Scriven spent significant time traveling abroad for his military assignments, he always maintained a permanent residence in Washington, where his family lived full-time and where he entertained guests when at home. He owned 1300 New Hampshire Avenue, N.W., from 1893 to 1928, and maintained it as his family's primary residence from 1893 until 1918, when he entered a lease agreement with the American Red Cross Woman's Club. He and his second wife, Elizabeth, moved to 2241 Bancroft Place, N.W., Washington, D.C., by the early 1930s, where Scriven spent his retirement years.

Brigadier General Scriven died at the age of 86 on March 7, 1940, and was buried at West Point.

== Bibliography ==
Scriven wrote a number of significant publications throughout his career, which strongly influenced military and aviation policy.

In the 1893, he received a gold medal and life membership to the Military Service Institution for his contribution to military literature for an essay entitled "The Nicaraguan Canal in its Military Aspects."

A review of the nature, use, field of service, and organization of the Signal corps of the Army, with an outline of its methods and technical apparatus, and notes on the service of information and the organization of the aviation service of the leading foreign armies in 1915; Scriven, George P. (1908). The transmission of military information: an outline of the service of a corps of intelligence, or of a signal corps, under modern conditions affecting the transmission of military information to troops in the field, and to the coast defense. W.H. Crawford. p. 153.

In 1910, while serving as Chief Signal Officer of the Philippines, he published a report analyzing the vulnerability of Corregidor Island to aerial surveillance and attack. According to historian Herbert A. Johnson, this "report ranks as one of the most farsighted staff studies of its day."

Scriven, George P. (October 1918). "Italy, Our Ally; Her Great Part In The War". American Bar Association Journal. 4 (4). American Bar Association: 620–639. JSTOR 25700572.

Scriven, George P. (August 1919). "The Awakening of Albania". Geographical Review. 8 (2). American Geographical Society: 73–83. doi:10.2307/207631. JSTOR 207631.

Scriven, George P. (March 1920). "The Future of Albania". The North American Review. 211 (772). University of Northern Iowa: 332–339. JSTOR 25120469.

Scriven, George P. (April 1921). "Some Highways of Albania and a Forgotten Riviera". Geographical Review. 11 (2). American Geographical Society: 198–206. doi:10.2307/207325. JSTOR 207325.

Scriven, George P. (1929). The Story of the Hudson's Bay Company. St. Anselm's Priory. ASIN B00DQ4XBKS.

== General George P. Scriven House ==
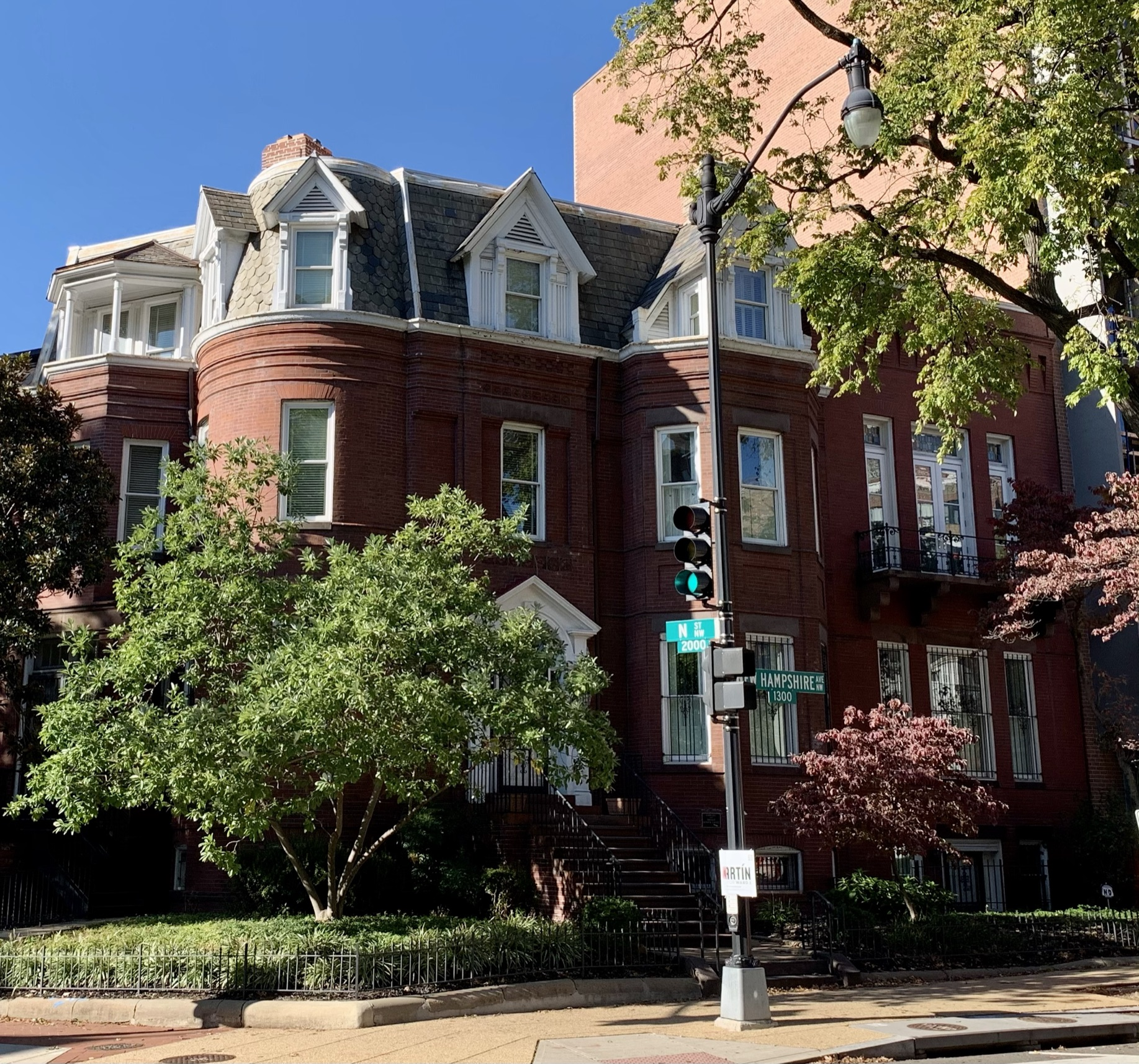
Brigadier General George P. Scriven House in Washington, D.C.

The house Scriven inhabited was added to the National Register of Historic Places on August 27, 2013, as "Property is associated with the lives of persons significant in our past." The Brigadier General George P. Scriven House is located at 1300 New Hampshire Avenue, N.W., in Washington, D.C. The single-family dwelling is located at the northwest corner of the intersection of New Hampshire Avenue and N Street. The building occupies historic Lot #56, Square 97 in the DuPont Circle neighborhood. The original permit to build, which was issued on May 15, 1884, noted George B. Whiting as architect and builder. The permit was for a three-story pressed brick building, with a flat roof embellished with a slate mansard and brick cornice. The plan of the house was to include a bow window, one bay window and a tower projection. The house as it appears today includes each of these specifications, as well as an addition at the north elevation, made under the design of architect Henry Simpson and the supervision of builder Charles A. Langley in 1901. While visually distinct, the design of the two-story addition complements the main building, featuring pressed brick, a flat roof, and matching double-hung windows and brownstone sills. The division between the main building and the addition is more prominent at the interior, where elaborate Colonial Revival decorative details such as Doric style pilasters and dentil molding sets the addition apart.

In June 1928 Scriven sold the house to the Club of Colonial Dames for District of Columbia. In 1957 the building was purchased by the National Society Colonial Dames XVII Century, the current owners.
