= Merry Ann Thompson Wright =

42nd President General of the Daughters of the American Revolution

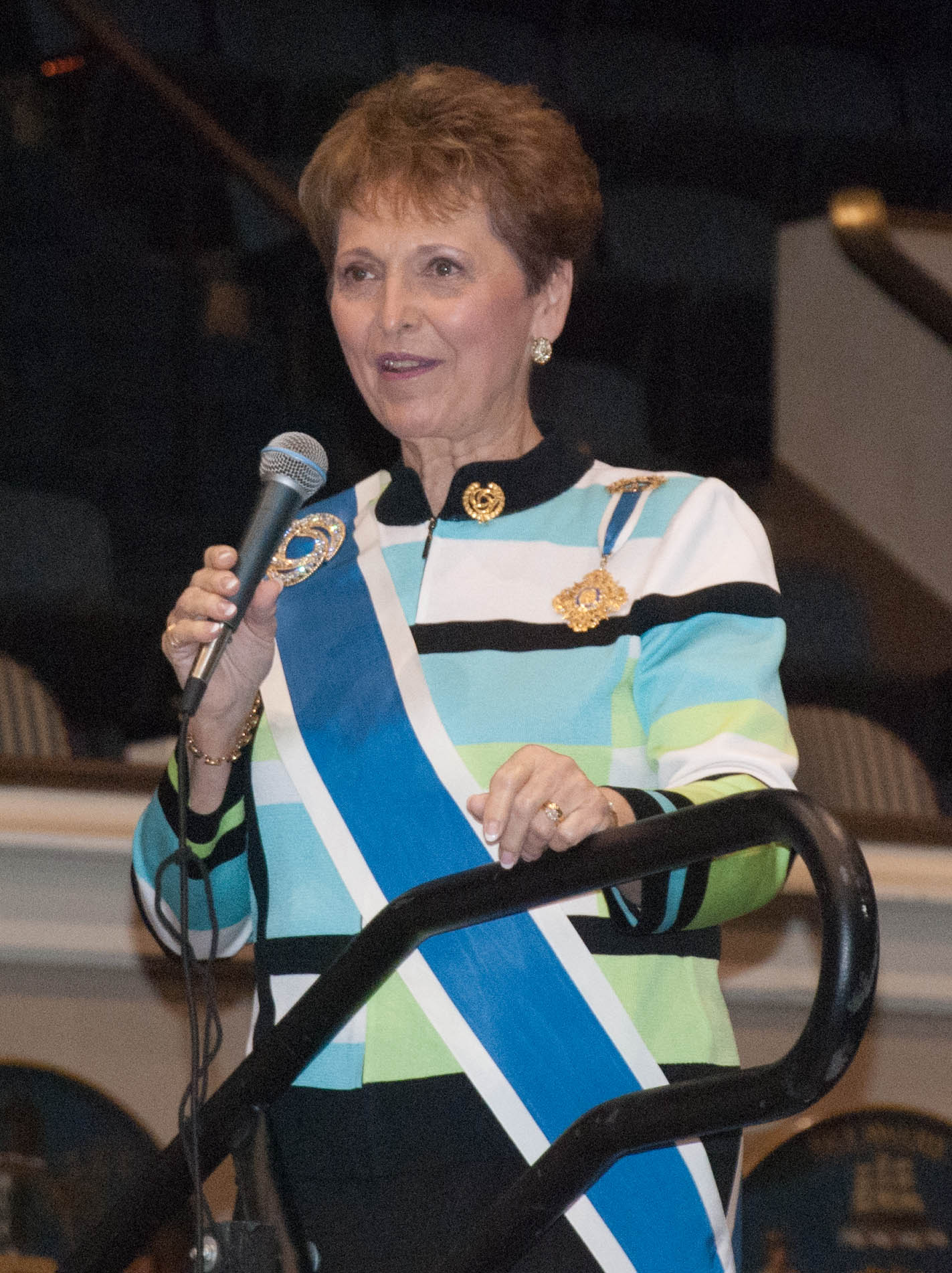
- Wright in 2012

42nd President General of the National Society Daughters of the American Revolution
- In office 2010–2013
- Preceded by: Linda Gist Calvin
- Succeeded by: Lynn Forney Young

Personal details
- Born: February 25, 1943 Syracuse, New York, U.S.
- Died: December 18, 2022 (aged 79) Wilmington, North Carolina, U.S.
- Spouse: Lawrence F. Wright
- Education: Franklin College; University of the South
- Occupation: businesswoman

Merry Ann Thompson Wright (February 25, 1943 – December 18, 2022) was an American businesswoman who served as the CEO of the American Lung Association of Central New York and as the 42nd president general of the National Society Daughters of the American Revolution.

== Early life and education ==
Wright was born Merry Ann Thompson on February 25, 1943, in Syracuse, New York to Audrey Thompson and Pearl Thompson. She grew up in New Woodstock, New York and graduated in 1961 from Cazenovia High School, where she was head majorette, a member of the National Honors Society, yearbook staff, and the League of Women Voters.

She attended Franklin College and the University of the South and was a member of Kappa Delta Pi.

== Career ==
Wright served as the chief executive officer of the American Lung Association of Central New York.

Wright joined the Colonel Marinus Willet Chapter of National Society Daughters of the American Revolution as a Junior member in 1967. She twice served as the New York State society's Outstanding Junior, in 1974 and 1979, and was the Northeastern Division Outstanding Junior in 1979. She served as Chief Personal Page to President General Jeannette Osborn Baylies. She went on to serve as the New York state regent from 1989 to 1992, the NSDAR director of development from 1998 to 2007, as vice president general, recording secretary general, and as first vice president general. From 2010 to 2013, she served as the 42nd president general of the Daughters of the American Revolution. After leaving office, she was elected honorary president general.

== Personal life ==
Wright was married to Lawrence F. Wright.

She retired in 2007 and moved to Leland, North Carolina. She was a member of St. Paul's Episcopal Church in Wilmington, serving as a senior warden, as a member of the church's book club, and an active member of Daughters of the King. Wright was also a member of the Rotary Club, the Association of Fundraising Professionals, the National Gavel Society, and the National Society Daughters of Founders and Patriots.

She died on December 18, 2022. Her funeral was held at St. Paul's Episcopal Church on January 7, 2023.
