= Mary Florence Taney =

American clubwoman

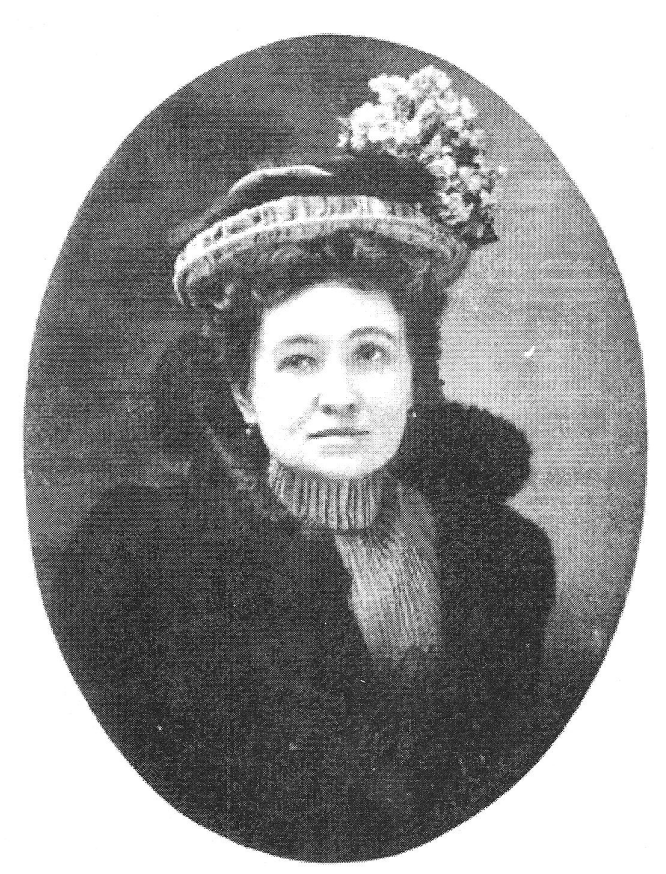

President General, National Society of the Dames of the Court of Honor

President General, National Society Colonial Dames XVII Century

Kentucky Notary Public
- Governor: Simon Bolivar Buckner

Personal details
- Born: May 15, 1856 Newport, Kentucky, U.S.
- Died: October 9, 1936 (aged 80) Covington, Kentucky, U.S.
- Resting place: Saint Mary's Cemetery; Fort Mitchell, Kentucky, U.S.
- Relatives: Roger B. Taney (granduncle); Florence Hardeman (niece)
- Occupation: Clubwoman, writer, public official, socialite

Mary Florence Taney (May 15, 1856 – October 9, 1936) was an American socialite, clubwoman, suffragist, civic leader, and writer. She was the first woman to serve as a Notary Public in Kentucky. She wrote the lyrics for the Kentucky State Song and authored Kentucky Pioneer Women. Taney founded the National Society Colonial Dames XVII Century in 1915 and the National Society of the Dames of the Court of Honor in 1921.

== Early life and education ==
Taney was born on May 15, 1856, in Newport, Kentucky to Peter Taney and Catherine Alphonse Taney. Her father was the nephew of Chief Justice Roger B. Taney. Her family had deep roots in the United States, as her ancestors sailed with Lord Baltimore, landing in Maryland in 1632. She was also related to Francis Scott Key.

She graduated with honors from Immaculata Academy, a Catholic school run by the Sisters of Nazareth.

== Career ==
Taney began writing in her youth, often publishing under the pen name "Frederick Stanhope Grant", appearing in the Free Press and the Cincinnati Commercial Gazette when she was a teenager. Taney wrote a biography on her granduncle, Chief Justice Taney. She was appointed to write poems for the World's Fair. One of her most famous poems was titled The Morning Glory. In 1893, she published Prose Sketches of Noted Pioneer Women, including a commemorative poem following each sketch. Her lyrics for the Kentucky State Song were set to music by Andrew J. Boex at "Kentucky Day" on November 10, 1895, during the Cotton States and International Exposition in Atlanta.

In 1889, Taney was appointed by Governor Simon Bolivar Buckner as the first woman Notary Public in Kentucky. She was later employed as the private secretary to the Collector of Kentucky Internal Revenue, for which she was paid $1,200 annually. She also worked as a teacher, singer, newspaper correspondent, and as assistant editor of the Women's Club Magazine.

She was a prominent society figure and was active in many social, civic, patriotic, and charitable activities. She and her sister, Elizabeth Taney Hardeman, attended parties hosted by Cornelius Vanderbilt and Nicholas Longworth and were guests of President William Howard Taft and First Lady Helen Herron Taft at the White House. She participated in Kentucky's centennial celebrations and supported women's suffrage. She was the founder and organizer of the Kenton County Audubon Society and served as president of the MacDowell Society and the Covington Art Club. She was also a member of the Keturah Moss Taylor Chapter of the Daughters of the American Revolution. In 1907, she founded the Colonial Daughters of America. In 1915, she founded the National Society Colonial Dames XVII Century. In 1921, she led the creation of the National Society of the Dames of the Court of Honor.

== Personal life and death ==
Taney never married and lived most of her adult life at her Covington mansion at 312 Garrard Street.

Taney died on October 9, 1926, at St. Elizabeth Hospital in Covington, following a long period of illness.

On October 11, 1936, the Catholic Ladies of Columbia held services for Taney at a local funeral home. A requiem high mass was sung for Taney at on St. Mary's Cathedral on October 12, 1936, followed by a burial in St. Mary's Cemetery.
