= Cazenovia High School =

Public high school in New York, United States

Location
- 31 Emory Ave; Cazenovia, NY 13035; United States
- Coordinates: 42.9340°N 75.8584°W

Information
- Type: Public High School
- Motto: "A Tradition of Excellence and Equity"
- School district: Cazenovia Central School District
- Superintendent: Chris DiFulvio
- Principal: Molly Hagan
- Teaching staff: 48.70 (FTE)
- Grades: 8–12
- Enrollment: 560 (2024–2025)
- Student to teacher ratio: 11.50
- Colors: Blue and Gold
- Athletics conference: New York State Public High School Athletic Association (NYSPHSAA)
- Mascot: Lakers
- Rival: Skaneateles High School
- Newspaper: The Cazenovia Current
- Website: cazenoviacsd.com

Cazenovia High School is a public high school located in Cazenovia, New York. It is operated by Cazenovia Central School District.

== Notable alumni ==
- Gennaro DiNapoli, former NFL player
- Steve Suhey, former NFL player
- Merry Ann Thompson Wright, CEO of the American Lung Association of Central New York and 42nd President General of the Daughters of the American Revolution
