= John J. Carty Award for the Advancement of Science =

Science award given by U.S. National Academy of Sciences

The John J. Carty Award for the Advancement of Science is awarded by the U.S. National Academy of Sciences "for noteworthy and distinguished accomplishments in any field of science within the charter of the Academy". Established by the American Telephone and Telegraph Company (AT&T) and first awarded in 1932, the medal has been awarded in specific fields since 1961. The recipient is awarded a $25,000 prize.

It is named after John J. Carty, an American electrical engineer who worked at AT&T.

== Recipients ==
Source: National Academy of Sciences

- 2022 Barney S. Graham For his groundbreaking work on vaccine and monoclonal antibody development for COVID-19, respiratory syncytial virus, influenza, HIV, and other emerging viruses.
- 2020 Carolyn R. Bertozzi For her invention of bioorthogonal chemistry—a broadly applicable class of processes for scalable production of novel biomaterials. Her innovative technologies have been extensively translated to commercial settings for therapeutic and diagnostics discovery. She also employs these tools for glycobiology studies and tuberculosis research.
- 2018 David M. Kreps, Paul Milgrom, and Robert B. Wilson (economics), For making fundamental advances to game theory by showing how incomplete information alters equilibrium outcomes
- 2016 Michael Goddard and Theodorus Meuwissen (agricultural sciences), For the development of genomic selection - uniting quantitative genetic theory with genomics technology - revolutionizing the genetic improvement of livestock and crops. Their research also invigorated genomic prediction, which has far ranging implications for fields from human medicine to conservation biology
- 2014 Joseph DeRisi (genome biology), for pioneering efforts to develop new genomic technologies and using the technologies to make discoveries in virology that are of fundamental and practical importance
- 2012 Michael I. Posner ( cognitive science), for outstanding contributions to the understanding of spatial attention and for pioneering investigations of the neural basis of cognition using non-invasive functional brain imaging methods.
- 2010 Andre Geim (physics), for his experimental realization and investigation of graphene, the two-dimensional form of carbon.
- 2009 Joseph Felsenstein (evolution), for revolutionizing population genetics, phylogenetic biology, and systematics by developing a sophisticated computational framework to deduce evolutionary relationships of genes and species from molecular data.
- 2008 Thomas Eisner (ecology), for pathbreaking studies of the myriad ways that organisms utilize chemistry to mediate ecological interactions and providing a foundation for the field of chemical ecology.
- 2007 Joseph R. Ecker (plant science), for contributions in the areas of ethylene signal transduction and Arabidopsis genomics that have paved the way for a revolution in modern agriculture.
- 2006 Russell F. Doolittle (computational science), for contributing seminal insights and methods for using computers as an aid to characterizing protein function, in comparing amino acid sequences, and for phylogenetic reconstructions.
- 2005 Robert J. Cava (materials), for his outstanding contributions in the synthesis and characterization of many new materials that display interesting and important superconducting, dielectric, magnetic, or thermal properties.
- 2004 Elinor Ostrom (social/political science), for her exceptional contributions to the study of social institutions, research that has greatly advanced our understanding of resource management, and the governance of local public economies.
- 2003 David A. Freedman (statistics), for his profound contributions to the theory and practice of statistics, including rigorous foundations for Bayesian influence and trenchant analysis of census adjustment.
- 2000 Donald Lynden-Bell (astronomy/astrophysics), for his outstanding work in theoretical astrophysics, and especially for the originality of his contributions to our understanding of the collective dynamic effects within stellar systems.
- 1997 Patrick V. Kirch (anthropology), for the unique breadth of his distinguished anthropological accomplishments, spanning many Pacific islands and joining their archeology with ethnobotany, ethnobiohistory, historical linguistics, and human biology.
- 1994 Marina Ratner (mathematics), for her striking proof of the Raghunathan conjectures.
- 1992 Joseph H. Taylor, Jr. (physics), for developing pulsar timing experiments with exquisite accuracy to make fundamental studies of gravitation, including gravitational radiation and high-order tests of general relativity.
- 1987 Motoo Kimura (evolutionary biology), "for demonstrating the role of stochastic processes in inducing and maintaining most allelic diveristy [sic] in nature, thereby unifying molecular biology with evolutionary theory, strengthening both fields".
- 1984 Robert H. Burris (agricultural sciences), for his penetrating studies of the biochemistry of nitrogen fixation have enriched the agricultural sciences by deed and example.
- 1981 Shing-Tung Yau (mathematics)
- 1978 John N. Mather (pure mathematics)
- 1975 J. Tuzo Wilson (earth science)
- 1971 James D. Watson (molecular biology)
- 1968 Murray Gell-Mann (theoretical physics)
- 1965 Alfred H. Sturtevant (biochemistry)
- 1963 Maurice Ewing (geophysics)
- 1961 Charles H. Townes (physics)
- 1953 Vannevar Bush
- 1950 Irving Langmuir
- 1947 Ross G. Harrison
- 1945 William F. Durand
- 1943 Edwin G. Conklin
- 1939 Sir William Bragg
- 1936 Edmund B. Wilson
- 1932 John J. Carty

== See also ==
- List of general science and technology awards
- List of awards named after people
