= To Promote a Knowledge of Steam Engineering and Iron Shipbuilding Act =

- Long title: An act to promote a knowledge of steam-engineering and iron-ship building among the students of scientific schools or colleges in the United States.
- Enacted by: the 45th United States Congress
- Effective: February 26, 1879

Citations
- Statutes at Large: 20 Stat. 322

Legislative history
- Introduced in the House as H.R. 3055 by Lorenzo Danford on June 28, 1878; Committee consideration by House Committee on Naval Affairs; Passed the House on; Passed the Senate on; Signed into law by President Rutherford B. Hayes on February 26, 1879

The To Promote a Knowledge of Steam Engineering and Iron Shipbuilding Act was a United States federal law (20 Stat. 322) that was passed on February 26, 1879.

Chap. 105. - An act to promote a knowledge of steam-engineering and iron-ship building among the students of scientific schools or colleges in the United States.

Be it enacted by the Senate and House of Representatives of the United States of America in Congress assembled, That for the purpose of promoting a knowledge of steam-engineering and iron-ship building among the young men of the United States, the President may, upon the application of an established scientific school or college within the United States, detail an officer from the Engineer Corps of the Navy as professor in such school or college: Provided, That the number of officers so detailed shall not at any time exceed twenty-five, and such details shall be governed by rules to be prescribed from time to time by the President: And provided further, That such details may be withheld or withdrawn whenever, in the judgement of the President, the interests of the public service shall so require.

Approved, February 26, 1879.

== Professors of Steam Engineering and Iron Shipbuilding ==
- Mortimer E. Cooley, University of Michigan, starting in 1881. This led to the creation of the Department of Naval Architecture and Marine Engineering.
- William F. Durand, Lafayette College, in Easton, Pennsylvania during the early 1880s.
- Henry K. Ivers, Washington University in St. Louis, 1882–1883.
