= Elizabeth Fry Page =

American writer (1865-1943)

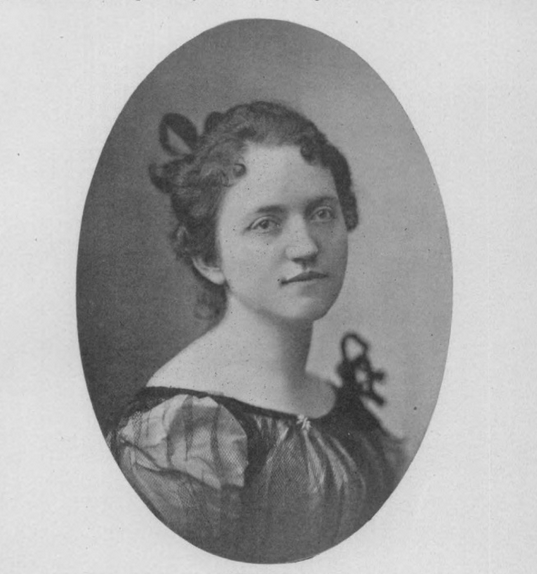
- Born: Elizabeth Fry; 1865; Hillsville, Virginia, U.S.
- Died: September 3, 1943 (aged 77–78); Nashville, Tennessee, U.S.
- Resting place: Forest Hill Cemetery, Chattanooga, Tennessee, U.S.
- Occupations: author, magazine editor, poet, journalist
- Spouse: David Samuel Page (m. 1898)
- Writing career
- Genres: essays, short stories, poetry

Elizabeth Fry Page (née, Fry; 1865 – September 3, 1943) was an American author and editor associated with the South. A co-founder of the Tennessee Woman's Press and Authors' Club, she served as the Poet Laureate of the Tennessee division of the Daughters of the American Revolution (D.A.R.) and that of the Tennessee Division, United Daughters of the Confederacy (UDC). She lectured on literary, musical and philosophical subjects. Coming from a long line of literary ancestors, Page's journalistic life began early, and she worked in many branches of her profession, as a journalist, magazine editor, essayist, short story writer and a producer of verse. Among her published works can be counted Vagabond Victor: Or, The Downfall of a Dog; a True Story (1908), Edward MacDowell, his work and ideals (1910), The romance of Southern journalism (1910), and A garden fantasy (1923). Page was also a veteran clubwoman.

== Early life and education ==
Elizabeth Fry was born in Hillsville, Virginia, 1865. She was a daughter of Col. George Thompson Fry (1843-1897), civil war veteran, and Mary A. A. (Cooley) Fry. She was of revolutionary ancestry. Her siblings included, brothers George and Henry, and a sister, Mary.

Page was educated at Girls' High School, Atlanta, Georgia, and by private tutors in English, music and philosophy. Page began her writing career by providing feature articles for newspapers in Atlanta.

== Career ==
Her first attempts at writing were girlish epistles written for the Sunny South's letter box.

She was a special writer for the Chattanooga Times, 1891-44. Next, she edited the Southern Florist and Gardener, 1894–97, resigning on account of ill-health. It was while editing the Southern Florist and Gardener that a pink chrysanthemum was named after her -the Elizabeth Fry- which attracted considerable attention, and proved a prize winner on several occasions. She was an associate editor at American Homes, 1895-96.

In Chattanooga, Tennessee, on January 12, 1898, she married David Samuel Page, a pharmacist. They resided for a bit in Louisville, Kentucky.

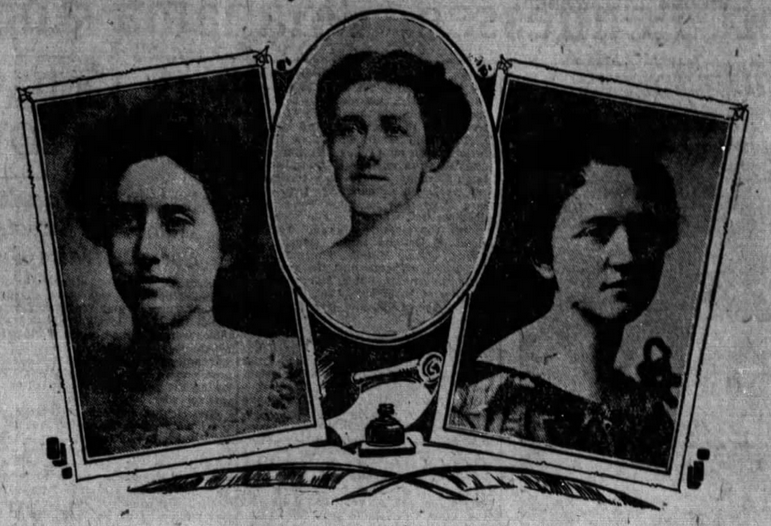
Ernestine Noa, Louise Munford Peeples, Elizabeth Fry Page (l-r), co-founders, Tennessee Woman's Press and Authors' Club, 1899

In 1899, with Ernestine Noa and Louise Munford Peeples, she co-founded the Tennessee Woman's Press and Authors' Club. Page held several office within the organization, including president.

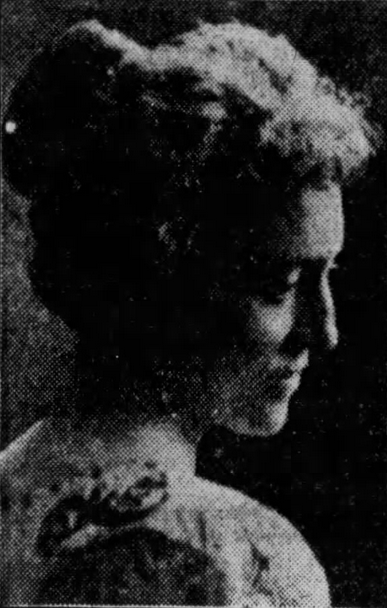
1911

Page was the author of, Vagabond Victor (juvenile), 1908, and Edward MacDowell—His Work and Ideals (Dodge and Co., N. Y.,). She wrote many stories, essays and poems in magazines. Many of her lyrics were set to music. She was the recipient of several prizes after participating in essay and poetry contests. She as associate editor of Taylor-Trotwood Magazine, Nashville, April–September, 1910. Page served as Poet Laureate of the Tennessee D.A.R., 1912–13, and of the Tennessee Division, UDC, 1913. She was a lecturer on literature and philosophical subjects.

Page was very involved in religious work of the Episcopal church. For seventeen years, in Nashville, she taught the adult Women's Bible class in Christ Church. She also taught a religious class for women in the Tennessee state prison. From 1925 to 1927, Page resided in Tampa, Florida. During part of that time, she served as religious educational secretary to Rev. Willis G. Clark, St. Andrew's Episcopal Church. From 1929 to 1935, she resided in Canyon, Texas, serving as Episcopal student counselor at the West Texas State Teachers College (now West Texas A&M University) and resident hostess at the Episcopal Diocese of Texas' "Little House of Fellowship". In 1931, along with 6,000 others, she attended the General Convention of the Episcopal Church at Denver, Colorado, as a representative of four organizations: the Daughters of the King (District of North Texas), the West Texas State Teachers College, the United Thank Offering, and the Woman's Auxiliary.

Page was a member of the D.A.R., U.D.C., Nashville Centennial Club, Nashville Story Tellers' League and the Southern Writers' League, as well as a sustaining member of the Nashville YWCA. She was the organizer and served as president of the Nashville Metaphysical Club. Page favored woman suffrage, and was a charter member of the Nashville Equal Suffrage League.

== Personal life ==
In December 1935, Page returned to Nashville, After an illness lasting two years, she died in Nashville, September 3, 1943. Burial was at Forest Hill Cemetery, Chattanooga.

== Selected works ==
- Vagabond Victor: Or, The Downfall of a Dog; a True Story, 1908
- Edward MacDowell, his work and ideals, by Elizabeth Fry Page, with poetical interpretations by the author., 1910
- The romance of Southern journalism, 1910
- A garden fantasy, 1923
- Lookout Mountain
