= John J. Carty =

American electrical engineer

- Born: April 14, 1861; Cambridge, Massachusetts
- Died: December 27, 1932 (aged 71); Baltimore, Maryland
- Awards: Edward Longstreth Medal (1905); Franklin Medal (1916); IEEE Edison Medal (1917); John Fritz Medal (1928)
- Scientific career
- Fields: Electrical engineering

Signature
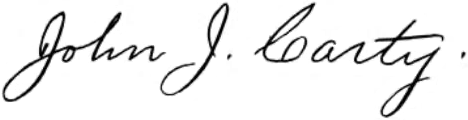

John Joseph Carty (April 14, 1861 – December 27, 1932) was an American electrical engineer and a major contributor to the development of telephone wires and related technology. He was a recipient of the Edison Medal. As Chief Engineer of AT&T, he was instrumental in the development of the first transcontinental telephone line. Carty was president of the American Institute of Electrical Engineers from 1915 to 1916.

He died at Johns Hopkins Hospital in Baltimore on December 27, 1932.

== Honors ==
- Edward Longstreth Medal of the Franklin Institute (1905)
- Fellow of the American Academy of Arts and Sciences (1915)
- Trustee of the Carnegie Institution (1916–1932)
- Franklin Medal of the Franklin Institute (1916)
- IEEE Edison Medal (1917)
- Member of the United States National Academy of Sciences (1917)
- Member of the American Philosophical Society (1921)
- John J. Carty Award of the National Academy of Sciences (1932)(inaugural)

== See also ==
- John J. Carty Award for the Advancement of Science
