= List of school districts in New York =

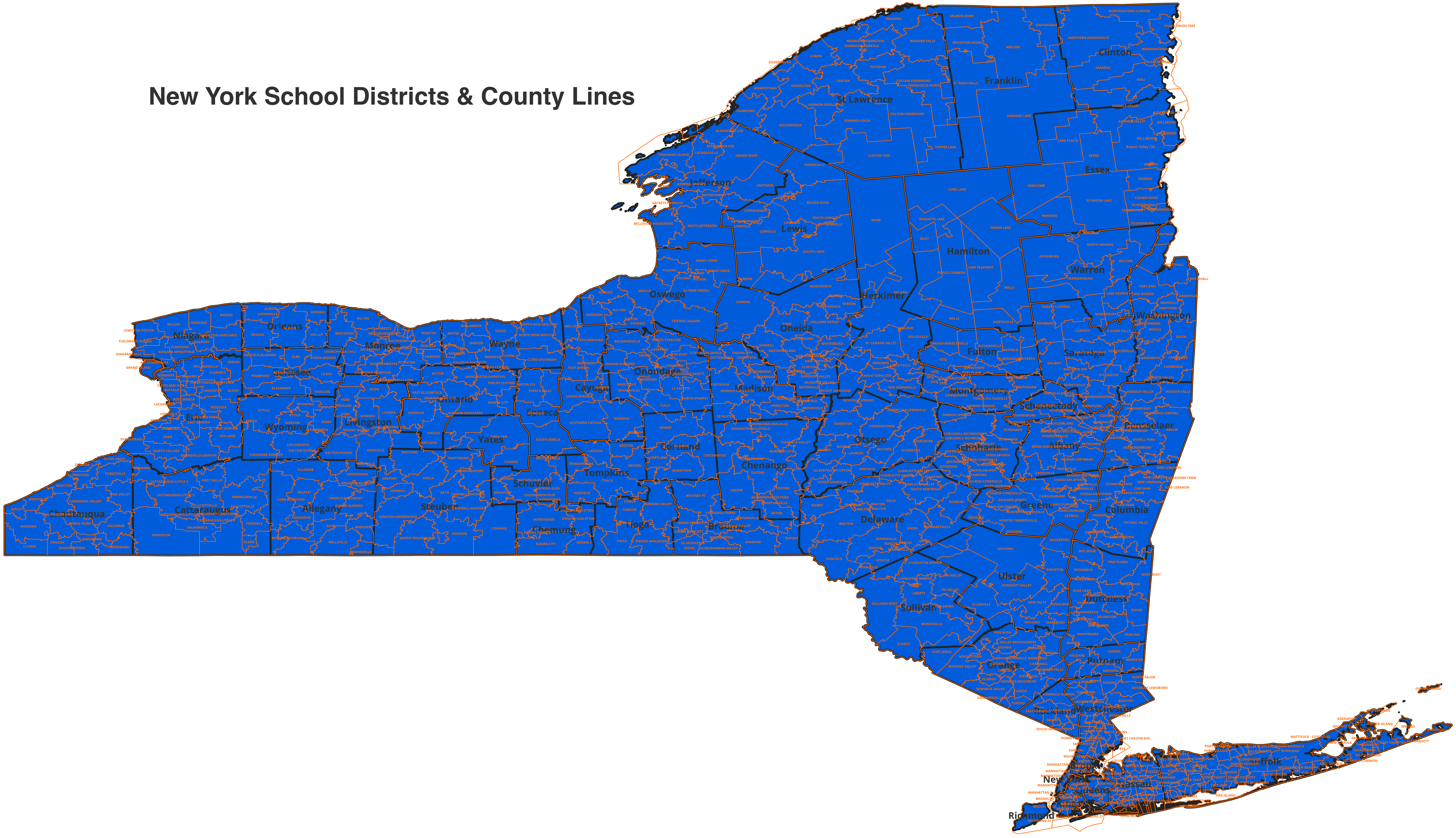
New York State School Districts and County lines: the map also shows the internal divisions of the New York City Department of Education (which the U.S. Census Bureau counts as a single school district)

The New York State Education Department (NYSED) divides the state into nine Joint Management Team (JMT) Regions, excluding New York City. Each JMT contains one or more Regional Information Centers (RIC), which contain one or more Boards of Cooperative Educational Services (BOCES), and each BOCES supports several school districts.

The majority of school districts are independent governments, and those are counted as separate governments by the U.S. Census Bureau. Five are not and are under the authority of their respective municipalities: Buffalo, New York City, Rochester, Syracuse, and Yonkers.

The table below is sorted by either the school district, number of students, county, BOCES, RIC and JMT. Some school districts are not part of BOCES; they are appended with "(not BOCES)".

School district	Students	County	BOCES	RIC	JMT
Addison Central School District #1	991	Steuben	Schuyler-Steuben-Chemung-Tioga-Allegany (Greater Southern Tier) BOCES	Greater Southern Tier RIC	Mid-South
Adirondack Central School District #1	1,146	Oneida	Jefferson-Lewis-Hamilton-Herkimer-Oneida BOCES	Mohawk RIC	Central Region
Afton Central School District #1	422	Chenango	Delaware-Chenango-Madison-Otsego BOCES	South Central RIC	Mid-South
Akron Central School District #1	1,197	Erie	Erie 1 BOCES	Erie RIC	West
Albany City School District (not BOCES)	9,228	Albany	Albany-Schoharie-Schenectady-Saratoga (Capital Region) BOCES	Northeastern RIC	Capital District/North Country
Albion Central School District #1	1,715	Orleans	Orleans-Niagara BOCES	Erie RIC	West
Alden Central School District #1	1,510	Erie	Erie 1 BOCES	Erie RIC	West
Alexander Central School District #2	725	Genesee	Genesee Valley BOCES (Genesee-Livingston-Steuben-Wyoming)	Wayne-Finger Lakes RIC	Mid-West
Alexandria Central School District #2	475	Jefferson	Jefferson-Lewis-Hamilton-Herkimer-Oneida BOCES	Mohawk RIC	Central Region
Alfred-Almond Central School District #1	476	Allegany	Schuyler-Steuben-Chemung-Tioga-Allegany (Greater Southern Tier) BOCES	Greater Southern Tier RIC	Mid-South
Allegany-Limestone Central School District #2	992	Cattaraugus	Cattaraugus-Allegany-Erie-Wyoming BOCES	Erie RIC	West
Altmar-Parish-Williamstown Central School District #2	968	Oswego	Oswego BOCES (CiTi: Center for Instruction, Technology & Innovation)	Central RIC	Mid-State
Amagansett Union Free School District #3	115	Suffolk	Eastern Suffolk (Suffolk-1) BOCES	Suffolk RIC	Long Island
Amherst Central School District #1	3,079	Erie	Erie 1 BOCES	Erie RIC	West
Amityville Union Free School District #6	2,655	Suffolk	Western Suffolk (Suffolk-3) BOCES	Suffolk RIC	Long Island
Amsterdam City School District	3,819	Montgomery	Hamilton-Fulton-Montgomery BOCES	Northeastern RIC	Capital District/North Country
Andes Central School District #2	72	Delaware	Otsego-Delaware-Schoharie-Greene (Otsego Northern Catskills) BOCES	South Central RIC	Mid-South
Andover Central School District #1	267	Allegany	Cattaraugus-Allegany-Erie-Wyoming BOCES	Erie RIC	West
Ardsley Union Free School District #5	2,268	Westchester	Westchester (Southern Westchester) BOCES	Lower Hudson RIC	Lower Hudson Valley
Argyle Central School District #1	475	Washington	Washington-Saratoga-Warren-Hamilton-Essex BOCES	Northeastern RIC	Capital District/North Country
Arkport Central School District #1	400	Steuben	Schuyler-Steuben-Chemung-Tioga-Allegany (Greater Southern Tier) BOCES	Greater Southern Tier RIC	Mid-South
Arlington Central School District #1	7,803	Dutchess	Dutchess BOCES	Mid-Hudson RIC	Mid-Hudson
Attica Central School District #1	1,116	Wyoming	Genesee Valley BOCES (Genesee-Livingston-Steuben-Wyoming)	Wayne-Finger Lakes RIC	Mid-West
Auburn City School District	3,990	Cayuga	Cayuga-Onondaga BOCES	Central RIC	Mid-State
AuSable Valley Central School District #1	1,075	Clinton	Clinton-Essex-Warren-Washington BOCES (Champlain Valley Educational Services)	Northeastern RIC	Capital District/North Country
Averill Park Central School District #2	2,567	Rensselaer	Rensselaer-Columbia-Greene (Questar III) BOCES	Northeastern RIC	Capital District/North Country
Avoca Central School District #1	379	Steuben	Schuyler-Steuben-Chemung-Tioga-Allegany (Greater Southern Tier) BOCES	Greater Southern Tier RIC	Mid-South
Avon Central School District #1	883	Livingston	Genesee Valley BOCES (Genesee-Livingston-Steuben-Wyoming)	Wayne-Finger Lakes RIC	Mid-West
Babylon Union Free School District #1	1,562	Suffolk	Western Suffolk (Suffolk-3) BOCES	Suffolk RIC	Long Island
Bainbridge-Guilford Central School District #1	760	Chenango	Delaware-Chenango-Madison-Otsego BOCES	South Central RIC	Mid-South
Baldwin Union Free School District #10	4,334	Nassau	Nassau BOCES	Nassau RIC	Long Island
Baldwinsville Central School District #1	5,420	Onondaga	Onondaga-Cortland-Madison BOCES	Central RIC	Mid-State
Ballston Spa Central School District #1	3,856	Saratoga	Washington-Saratoga-Warren-Hamilton-Essex BOCES	Northeastern RIC	Capital District/North Country
Barker Central School District #1	627	Niagara	Orleans-Niagara BOCES	Erie RIC	West
Batavia City School District	2,140	Genesee	Genesee Valley BOCES (Genesee-Livingston-Steuben-Wyoming)	Wayne-Finger Lakes RIC	Mid-West
Bath Central School District #2	1,392	Steuben	Schuyler-Steuben-Chemung-Tioga-Allegany (Greater Southern Tier) BOCES	Greater Southern Tier RIC	Mid-South
Bay Shore Union Free School District #1	5,779	Suffolk	Eastern Suffolk (Suffolk-1) BOCES	Suffolk RIC	Long Island
Bayport-Blue Point Union Free School District #5	1,850	Suffolk	Eastern Suffolk (Suffolk-1) BOCES	Suffolk RIC	Long Island
Beacon City School District	2,600	Dutchess	Dutchess BOCES	Mid-Hudson RIC	Mid-Hudson
Beaver River Central School District #1	854	Lewis	Jefferson-Lewis-Hamilton-Herkimer-Oneida BOCES	Mohawk RIC	Central Region
Bedford Central School District #2	3,440	Westchester	Putnam-Westchester (Putnam-Northern Westchester) BOCES	Lower Hudson RIC	Lower Hudson Valley
Beekmantown Central School District #1	2,071	Clinton	Clinton-Essex-Warren-Washington BOCES (Champlain Valley Educational Services)	Northeastern RIC	Capital District/North Country
Belfast Central School District #1	318	Allegany	Cattaraugus-Allegany-Erie-Wyoming BOCES	Erie RIC	West
Belleville-Henderson Central School District #9	473	Jefferson	Jefferson-Lewis-Hamilton-Herkimer-Oneida BOCES	Mohawk RIC	Central Region
Bellmore Union Free School District #7	1,173	Nassau	Nassau BOCES	Nassau RIC	Long Island
Bellmore-Merrick Central High School District #3	5,261	Nassau	Nassau BOCES	Nassau RIC	Long Island
Bemus Point Central School District #1	562	Chautauqua	Erie 2 Chautauqua-Cattaraugus BOCES	Erie RIC	West
Berkshire Union Free School District #8	0	Columbia	Rensselaer-Columbia-Greene (Questar III) BOCES	Northeastern RIC	Capital District/North Country
Berlin Central School District #1	609	Rensselaer	Rensselaer-Columbia-Greene (Questar III) BOCES	Northeastern RIC	Capital District/North Country
Berne-Knox-Westerlo Central School District #1	691	Albany	Albany-Schoharie-Schenectady-Saratoga (Capital Region) BOCES	Northeastern RIC	Capital District/North Country
Bethlehem Central School District #6	4,162	Albany	Albany-Schoharie-Schenectady-Saratoga (Capital Region) BOCES	Northeastern RIC	Capital District/North Country
Bethpage Union Free School District #21	3,065	Nassau	Nassau BOCES	Nassau RIC	Long Island
Binghamton City School District	4,615	Broome	Broome-Tioga BOCES	South Central RIC	Mid-South
Blind Brook-Rye Union Free School District #5	1,299	Westchester	Westchester (Southern Westchester) BOCES	Lower Hudson RIC	Lower Hudson Valley
Bolivar-Richburg Central School District #2	658	Allegany	Cattaraugus-Allegany-Erie-Wyoming BOCES	Erie RIC	West
Bolton Central School District #1	164	Warren	Washington-Saratoga-Warren-Hamilton-Essex BOCES	Northeastern RIC	Capital District/North Country
Boquet Valley Central School District at Elizabethtown-Lewis-Westport #1	403	Essex	Clinton-Essex-Warren-Washington BOCES (Champlain Valley Educational Services)	Northeastern RIC	Capital District/North Country
Bradford Central School District #1	231	Steuben	Schuyler-Steuben-Chemung-Tioga-Allegany (Greater Southern Tier) BOCES	Greater Southern Tier RIC	Mid-South
Brasher Falls Central School District #1	932	Saint Lawrence	Saint Lawrence-Lewis BOCES	Northeastern RIC	Capital District/North Country
Brentwood Union Free School District #12	17,947	Suffolk	Eastern Suffolk (Suffolk-1) BOCES	Suffolk RIC	Long Island
Brewster Central School District #1	2,956	Putnam	Putnam-Westchester (Putnam-Northern Westchester) BOCES	Lower Hudson RIC	Lower Hudson Valley
Briarcliff Manor Union Free School District #2	1,321	Westchester	Putnam-Westchester (Putnam-Northern Westchester) BOCES	Lower Hudson RIC	Lower Hudson Valley
Bridgehampton Union Free School District #9	171	Suffolk	Eastern Suffolk (Suffolk-1) BOCES	Suffolk RIC	Long Island
Brighton Central School District #1	3,425	Monroe	Monroe 1 BOCES	Monroe RIC	Mid-West
Broadalbin-Perth Central School District #2	1,613	Fulton	Hamilton-Fulton-Montgomery BOCES	Northeastern RIC	Capital District/North Country
Brockport Central School District #1	3,227	Monroe	Monroe 2 – Orleans BOCES	Monroe RIC	Mid-West
Brocton Central School District #1	473	Chautauqua	Erie 2 Chautauqua-Cattaraugus BOCES	Erie RIC	West
Bronxville Union Free School District #3	1,550	Westchester	Westchester (Southern Westchester) BOCES	Lower Hudson RIC	Lower Hudson Valley
Brookfield Central School District #9	169	Madison	Oneida-Herkimer-Madison BOCES	Mohawk RIC	Central Region
Brookhaven-Comsewogue Union Free School District #3	3,506	Suffolk	Eastern Suffolk (Suffolk-1) BOCES	Suffolk RIC	Long Island
Brunswick Central School District (Brittonkill) #2	1,085	Rensselaer	Rensselaer-Columbia-Greene (Questar III) BOCES	Northeastern RIC	Capital District/North Country
Brushton-Moira Central School District #1	774	Franklin	Franklin-Essex-Hamilton BOCES	Northeastern RIC	Capital District/North Country
Buffalo City School District (not BOCES)	29,859	Erie	Erie 1 BOCES	Erie RIC	West
Burnt Hills-Ballston Lake Central School District #1	3,091	Saratoga	Albany-Schoharie-Schenectady-Saratoga (Capital Region) BOCES	Northeastern RIC	Capital District/North Country
Byram Hills Central School District #1	2,335	Westchester	Westchester (Southern Westchester) BOCES	Lower Hudson RIC	Lower Hudson Valley
Byron-Bergen Central School District #1	881	Genesee	Genesee Valley BOCES (Genesee-Livingston-Steuben-Wyoming)	Wayne-Finger Lakes RIC	Mid-West
Cairo-Durham Central School District #1	1,080	Greene	Rensselaer-Columbia-Greene (Questar III) BOCES	Northeastern RIC	Capital District/North Country
Caledonia-Mumford Central School District #1	797	Livingston	Genesee Valley BOCES (Genesee-Livingston-Steuben-Wyoming)	Wayne-Finger Lakes RIC	Mid-West
Cambridge Central School District #10	746	Washington	Washington-Saratoga-Warren-Hamilton-Essex BOCES	Northeastern RIC	Capital District/North Country
Camden Central School District #1	1,918	Oneida	Madison-Oneida BOCES	Mohawk RIC	Central Region
Campbell-Savona Central School District #3	799	Steuben	Schuyler-Steuben-Chemung-Tioga-Allegany (Greater Southern Tier) BOCES	Greater Southern Tier RIC	Mid-South
Canajoharie Central School District #1	818	Montgomery	Hamilton-Fulton-Montgomery BOCES	Northeastern RIC	Capital District/North Country
Canandaigua City School District	3,172	Ontario	Ontario-Seneca-Yates-Cayuga-Wayne (Wayne-Finger Lakes) BOCES	Wayne-Finger Lakes RIC	Mid-West
Canaseraga Central School District #2	207	Allegany	Schuyler-Steuben-Chemung-Tioga-Allegany (Greater Southern Tier) BOCES	Greater Southern Tier RIC	Mid-South
Canastota Central School District #1	1,195	Madison	Madison-Oneida BOCES	Mohawk RIC	Central Region
Candor Central School District #1	681	Tioga	Tompkins-Seneca-Tioga BOCES	Central RIC	Mid-State
Canisteo-Greenwood Central School District #2	944	Steuben	Schuyler-Steuben-Chemung-Tioga-Allegany (Greater Southern Tier) BOCES	Greater Southern Tier RIC	Mid-South
Canton Central School District #1	1,067	Saint Lawrence	Saint Lawrence-Lewis BOCES	Northeastern RIC	Capital District/North Country
Carle Place Union Free School District #11	1,339	Nassau	Nassau BOCES	Nassau RIC	Long Island
Carmel Central School District #2	3,707	Putnam	Putnam-Westchester (Putnam-Northern Westchester) BOCES	Lower Hudson RIC	Lower Hudson Valley
Carthage Central School District #1	3,170	Jefferson	Jefferson-Lewis-Hamilton-Herkimer-Oneida BOCES	Mohawk RIC	Central Region
Cassadaga Valley Central School District #1	788	Chautauqua	Erie 2 Chautauqua-Cattaraugus BOCES	Erie RIC	West
Cato-Meridian Central School District #1	822	Cayuga	Cayuga-Onondaga BOCES	Central RIC	Mid-State
Catskill Central School District #1	1,211	Greene	Rensselaer-Columbia-Greene (Questar III) BOCES	Northeastern RIC	Capital District/North Country
Cattaraugus-Little Valley Central School District #2	789	Cattaraugus	Cattaraugus-Allegany-Erie-Wyoming BOCES	Erie RIC	West
Cazenovia Central School District #1	1,328	Madison	Onondaga-Cortland-Madison BOCES	Central RIC	Mid-State
Center Moriches Union Free School District #33	1,417	Suffolk	Eastern Suffolk (Suffolk-1) BOCES	Suffolk RIC	Long Island
Central Islip Union Free School District #13	7,688	Suffolk	Eastern Suffolk (Suffolk-1) BOCES	Suffolk RIC	Long Island
Central Square Central School District #1	3,349	Oswego	Oswego BOCES (CiTi: Center for Instruction, Technology & Innovation)	Central RIC	Mid-State
Central Valley Central School District at Ilion-Mohawk #1	1,979	Herkimer	Herkimer-Fulton-Hamilton-Otsego BOCES	Mohawk RIC	Central Region
Chappaqua Central School District #4	3,567	Westchester	Putnam-Westchester (Putnam-Northern Westchester) BOCES	Lower Hudson RIC	Lower Hudson Valley
Charlotte Valley Central School District #1	302	Delaware	Otsego-Delaware-Schoharie-Greene (Otsego Northern Catskills) BOCES	South Central RIC	Mid-South
Chateaugay Central School District #1	562	Franklin	Franklin-Essex-Hamilton BOCES	Northeastern RIC	Capital District/North Country
Chatham Central School District #1	884	Columbia	Rensselaer-Columbia-Greene (Questar III) BOCES	Northeastern RIC	Capital District/North Country
Chautauqua Lake Central School District #3	684	Chautauqua	Erie 2 Chautauqua-Cattaraugus BOCES	Erie RIC	West
Chazy Union Free School District #1	434	Clinton	Clinton-Essex-Warren-Washington BOCES (Champlain Valley Educational Services)	Northeastern RIC	Capital District/North Country
Cheektowaga Central School District #1	2,365	Erie	Erie 1 BOCES	Erie RIC	West
Cheektowaga-Maryvale Union Free School District #2	2,198	Erie	Erie 1 BOCES	Erie RIC	West
Cheektowaga-Sloan Union Free School District #9	1,268	Erie	Erie 1 BOCES	Erie RIC	West
Chenango Forks Central School District #1	1,269	Broome	Broome-Tioga BOCES	South Central RIC	Mid-South
Chenango Valley Central School District #1	1,625	Broome	Broome-Tioga BOCES	South Central RIC	Mid-South
Cherry Valley-Springfield Central School District #2	402	Otsego	Otsego-Delaware-Schoharie-Greene (Otsego Northern Catskills) BOCES	South Central RIC	Mid-South
Chester Union Free School District #1	933	Orange	Orange-Ulster BOCES	Mid-Hudson RIC	Mid-Hudson
Chittenango Central School District #1	1,837	Madison	Onondaga-Cortland-Madison BOCES	Central RIC	Mid-State
Churchville-Chili Central School District #1	3,790	Monroe	Monroe 2 – Orleans BOCES	Monroe RIC	Mid-West
Cincinnatus Central School District #1	460	Cortland	Onondaga-Cortland-Madison BOCES	Central RIC	Mid-State
Clarence Central School District #1	4,279	Erie	Erie 1 BOCES	Erie RIC	West
Clarkstown Central School District #1	8,052	Rockland	Rockland BOCES	Lower Hudson RIC	Lower Hudson Valley
Cleveland Hill Union Free School District #3	1,396	Erie	Erie 1 BOCES	Erie RIC	West
Clifton-Fine Central School District #1	253	Saint Lawrence	Saint Lawrence-Lewis BOCES	Northeastern RIC	Capital District/North Country
Clinton Central School District #1	1,187	Oneida	Oneida-Herkimer-Madison BOCES	Mohawk RIC	Central Region
Clyde-Savannah Central School District #1	677	Wayne	Ontario-Seneca-Yates-Cayuga-Wayne (Wayne-Finger Lakes) BOCES	Wayne-Finger Lakes RIC	Mid-West
Clymer Central School District #1	293	Chautauqua	Erie 2 Chautauqua-Cattaraugus BOCES	Erie RIC	West
Cobleskill-Richmondville Central School District #2	1,510	Schoharie	Albany-Schoharie-Schenectady-Saratoga (Capital Region) BOCES	Northeastern RIC	Capital District/North Country
Cohoes City School District	1,900	Albany	Albany-Schoharie-Schenectady-Saratoga (Capital Region) BOCES	Northeastern RIC	Capital District/North Country
Cold Spring Harbor Central School District #2	1,534	Suffolk	Western Suffolk (Suffolk-3) BOCES	Suffolk RIC	Long Island
Colton-Pierrepont Central School District #1	374	Saint Lawrence	Saint Lawrence-Lewis BOCES	Northeastern RIC	Capital District/North Country
Commack Union Free School District #10	5,650	Suffolk	Western Suffolk (Suffolk-3) BOCES	Suffolk RIC	Long Island
Connetquot Central School District #7	5,377	Suffolk	Eastern Suffolk (Suffolk-1) BOCES	Suffolk RIC	Long Island
Cooperstown Central School District #1	776	Otsego	Otsego-Delaware-Schoharie-Greene (Otsego Northern Catskills) BOCES	South Central RIC	Mid-South
Copenhagen Central School District #1	474	Lewis	Jefferson-Lewis-Hamilton-Herkimer-Oneida BOCES	Mohawk RIC	Central Region
Copiague Union Free School District #5	4,519	Suffolk	Western Suffolk (Suffolk-3) BOCES	Suffolk RIC	Long Island
Corinth Central School District #1	1,024	Saratoga	Washington-Saratoga-Warren-Hamilton-Essex BOCES	Northeastern RIC	Capital District/North Country
Corning City School District	4,365	Steuben	Schuyler-Steuben-Chemung-Tioga-Allegany (Greater Southern Tier) BOCES	Greater Southern Tier RIC	Mid-South
Cornwall Central School District #1	3,089	Orange	Orange-Ulster BOCES	Mid-Hudson RIC	Mid-Hudson
Cortland City School District	1,877	Cortland	Onondaga-Cortland-Madison BOCES	Central RIC	Mid-State
Coxsackie-Athens Central School District #1	1,109	Greene	Rensselaer-Columbia-Greene (Questar III) BOCES	Northeastern RIC	Capital District/North Country
Croton-Harmon Union Free School District #2	1,567	Westchester	Putnam-Westchester (Putnam-Northern Westchester) BOCES	Lower Hudson RIC	Lower Hudson Valley
Crown Point Central School District #3	306	Essex	Clinton-Essex-Warren-Washington BOCES (Champlain Valley Educational Services)	Northeastern RIC	Capital District/North Country
Cuba-Rushford Central School District #2	715	Allegany	Cattaraugus-Allegany-Erie-Wyoming BOCES	Erie RIC	West
Dalton-Nunda Central School District (Keshequa) #1	488	Livingston	Genesee Valley BOCES (Genesee-Livingston-Steuben-Wyoming)	Wayne-Finger Lakes RIC	Mid-West
Dansville Central School District #1	1,250	Livingston	Genesee Valley BOCES (Genesee-Livingston-Steuben-Wyoming)	Wayne-Finger Lakes RIC	Mid-West
Deer Park Union Free School District #7	4,047	Suffolk	Western Suffolk (Suffolk-3) BOCES	Suffolk RIC	Long Island
Delaware Academy Central School District at Delhi #1	730	Delaware	Delaware-Chenango-Madison-Otsego BOCES	South Central RIC	Mid-South
Depew Union Free School District #7	1,928	Erie	Erie 1 BOCES	Erie RIC	West
Deposit Central School District #1	479	Broome	Broome-Tioga BOCES	South Central RIC	Mid-South
DeRuyter Central School District #1	298	Madison	Onondaga-Cortland-Madison BOCES	Central RIC	Mid-State
Dobbs Ferry Union Free School District #3	1,443	Westchester	Westchester (Southern Westchester) BOCES	Lower Hudson RIC	Lower Hudson Valley
Dolgeville Central School District #3	748	Herkimer	Herkimer-Fulton-Hamilton-Otsego BOCES	Mohawk RIC	Central Region
Dover Union Free School District #2	1,327	Dutchess	Dutchess BOCES	Mid-Hudson RIC	Mid-Hudson
Downsville Central School District #1	220	Delaware	Delaware-Chenango-Madison-Otsego BOCES	South Central RIC	Mid-South
Dryden Central School District #1	1,318	Tompkins	Tompkins-Seneca-Tioga BOCES	Central RIC	Mid-State
Duanesburg Central School District #1	653	Schenectady	Albany-Schoharie-Schenectady-Saratoga (Capital Region) BOCES	Northeastern RIC	Capital District/North Country
Dundee Central School District #1	578	Yates	Ontario-Seneca-Yates-Cayuga-Wayne (Wayne-Finger Lakes) BOCES	Wayne-Finger Lakes RIC	Mid-West
Dunkirk City School District	2,019	Chautauqua	Erie 2 Chautauqua-Cattaraugus BOCES	Erie RIC	West
East Aurora Union Free School District #1	1,744	Erie	Erie 2 Chautauqua-Cattaraugus BOCES	Erie RIC	West
East Bloomfield Central School District #1	690	Ontario	Ontario-Seneca-Yates-Cayuga-Wayne (Wayne-Finger Lakes) BOCES	Wayne-Finger Lakes RIC	Mid-West
East Greenbush Central School District #1	4,307	Rensselaer	Rensselaer-Columbia-Greene (Questar III) BOCES	Northeastern RIC	Capital District/North Country
East Hampton Union Free School District #1	1,660	Suffolk	Eastern Suffolk (Suffolk-1) BOCES	Suffolk RIC	Long Island
East Irondequoit Central School District #1	2,744	Monroe	Monroe 1 BOCES	Monroe RIC	Mid-West
East Islip Union Free School District #3	3,518	Suffolk	Eastern Suffolk (Suffolk-1) BOCES	Suffolk RIC	Long Island
East Meadow Union Free School District #3	8,015	Nassau	Nassau BOCES	Nassau RIC	Long Island
East Moriches Union Free School District #34	676	Suffolk	Eastern Suffolk (Suffolk-1) BOCES	Suffolk RIC	Long Island
East Quogue Union Free School District #17	380	Suffolk	Eastern Suffolk (Suffolk-1) BOCES	Suffolk RIC	Long Island
East Ramapo Central School District (Spring Valley) #2	12,163	Rockland	Rockland BOCES	Lower Hudson RIC	Lower Hudson Valley
East Rochester Union Free School District #13	873	Monroe	Monroe 1 BOCES	Monroe RIC	Mid-West
East Rockaway Union Free School District #19	1,182	Nassau	Nassau BOCES	Nassau RIC	Long Island
East Syracuse Minoa Central School District #1	3,379	Onondaga	Onondaga-Cortland-Madison BOCES	Central RIC	Mid-State
East Williston Union Free School District #2	1,622	Nassau	Nassau BOCES	Nassau RIC	Long Island
Eastchester Union Free School District #1	2,961	Westchester	Westchester (Southern Westchester) BOCES	Lower Hudson RIC	Lower Hudson Valley
Eastport-South Manor Central School District #12	2,721	Suffolk	Eastern Suffolk (Suffolk-1) BOCES	Suffolk RIC	Long Island
Eden Central School District #1	1,269	Erie	Erie 2 Chautauqua-Cattaraugus BOCES	Erie RIC	West
Edgemont Union Free School District #6	1,840	Westchester	Westchester (Southern Westchester) BOCES	Lower Hudson RIC	Lower Hudson Valley
Edinburg Common School District #1	55	Saratoga	Hamilton-Fulton-Montgomery BOCES	Northeastern RIC	Capital District/North Country
Edmeston Central School District #1	393	Otsego	Otsego-Delaware-Schoharie-Greene (Otsego Northern Catskills) BOCES	South Central RIC	Mid-South
Edwards-Knox Central School District #2	452	Saint Lawrence	Saint Lawrence-Lewis BOCES	Northeastern RIC	Capital District/North Country
Elba Central School District #1	411	Genesee	Genesee Valley BOCES (Genesee-Livingston-Steuben-Wyoming)	Wayne-Finger Lakes RIC	Mid-West
Eldred Central School District #1	457	Sullivan	Sullivan BOCES	Mid-Hudson RIC	Mid-Hudson
Ellenville Central School District #2	1,386	Ulster	Ulster BOCES	Mid-Hudson RIC	Mid-Hudson
Ellicottville Central School District #1	494	Cattaraugus	Cattaraugus-Allegany-Erie-Wyoming BOCES	Erie RIC	West
Elmira City School District	5,171	Chemung	Schuyler-Steuben-Chemung-Tioga-Allegany (Greater Southern Tier) BOCES	Greater Southern Tier RIC	Mid-South
Elmira Heights Central School District #2	966	Chemung	Schuyler-Steuben-Chemung-Tioga-Allegany (Greater Southern Tier) BOCES	Greater Southern Tier RIC	Mid-South
Elmont Union Free School District #16	3,376	Nassau	Nassau BOCES	Nassau RIC	Long Island
Elmsford Union Free School District #9	1,034	Westchester	Westchester (Southern Westchester) BOCES	Lower Hudson RIC	Lower Hudson Valley
Elwood Union Free School District #1	1,995	Suffolk	Western Suffolk (Suffolk-3) BOCES	Suffolk RIC	Long Island
Evans-Brant Central School District (Lake Shore) #1	2,050	Erie	Erie 2 Chautauqua-Cattaraugus BOCES	Erie RIC	West
Fabius-Pompey Central School District #1	613	Onondaga	Onondaga-Cortland-Madison BOCES	Central RIC	Mid-State
Fairport Central School District #1	5,214	Monroe	Monroe 1 BOCES	Monroe RIC	Mid-West
Falconer Central School District #1	1,052	Chautauqua	Erie 2 Chautauqua-Cattaraugus BOCES	Erie RIC	West
Fallsburg Central School District #1	1,441	Sullivan	Sullivan BOCES	Mid-Hudson RIC	Mid-Hudson
Farmingdale Union Free School District #22	5,372	Nassau	Nassau BOCES	Nassau RIC	Long Island
Fayetteville-Manlius Central School District #1	4,199	Onondaga	Onondaga-Cortland-Madison BOCES	Central RIC	Mid-State
Fillmore Central School District #1	602	Allegany	Cattaraugus-Allegany-Erie-Wyoming BOCES	Erie RIC	West
Fire Island Union Free School District #14	41	Suffolk	Eastern Suffolk (Suffolk-1) BOCES	Suffolk RIC	Long Island
Fishers Island Union Free School District #4	56	Suffolk	Eastern Suffolk (Suffolk-1) BOCES	Suffolk RIC	Long Island
Floral Park-Bellerose Union Free School District #22	1,545	Nassau	Nassau BOCES	Nassau RIC	Long Island
Florida Union Free School District #15	677	Orange	Orange-Ulster BOCES	Mid-Hudson RIC	Mid-Hudson
Fonda-Fultonville Central School District #1	1,262	Montgomery	Hamilton-Fulton-Montgomery BOCES	Northeastern RIC	Capital District/North Country
Forestville Central School District #3	402	Chautauqua	Erie 2 Chautauqua-Cattaraugus BOCES	Erie RIC	West
Fort Ann Central School District #2	450	Washington	Washington-Saratoga-Warren-Hamilton-Essex BOCES	Northeastern RIC	Capital District/North Country
Fort Edward Union Free School District #1	357	Washington	Washington-Saratoga-Warren-Hamilton-Essex BOCES	Northeastern RIC	Capital District/North Country
Fort Plain Central School District #1	635	Montgomery	Hamilton-Fulton-Montgomery BOCES	Northeastern RIC	Capital District/North Country
Frankfort-Schuyler Central School District #2	892	Herkimer	Herkimer-Fulton-Hamilton-Otsego BOCES	Mohawk RIC	Central Region
Franklin Central School District #1	195	Delaware	Delaware-Chenango-Madison-Otsego BOCES	South Central RIC	Mid-South
Franklin Square Union Free School District #17	1,848	Nassau	Nassau BOCES	Nassau RIC	Long Island
Franklinville Central School District #1	597	Cattaraugus	Cattaraugus-Allegany-Erie-Wyoming BOCES	Erie RIC	West
Fredonia Central School District #1	1,458	Chautauqua	Erie 2 Chautauqua-Cattaraugus BOCES	Erie RIC	West
Freeport Union Free School District #9	6,095	Nassau	Nassau BOCES	Nassau RIC	Long Island
Frewsburg Central School District #1	733	Chautauqua	Erie 2 Chautauqua-Cattaraugus BOCES	Erie RIC	West
Friendship Central School District #1	265	Allegany	Cattaraugus-Allegany-Erie-Wyoming BOCES	Erie RIC	West
Frontier Central School District #4	4,427	Erie	Erie 1 BOCES	Erie RIC	West
Fulton City School District	3,082	Oswego	Oswego BOCES (CiTi: Center for Instruction, Technology & Innovation)	Central RIC	Mid-State
Galway Central School District #1	846	Saratoga	Washington-Saratoga-Warren-Hamilton-Essex BOCES	Northeastern RIC	Capital District/North Country
Gananda Central School District #2	851	Wayne	Ontario-Seneca-Yates-Cayuga-Wayne (Wayne-Finger Lakes) BOCES	Wayne-Finger Lakes RIC	Mid-West
Garden City Union Free School District #18	4,024	Nassau	Nassau BOCES	Nassau RIC	Long Island
Garrison Union Free School District #4	209	Putnam	Putnam-Westchester (Putnam-Northern Westchester) BOCES	Lower Hudson RIC	Lower Hudson Valley
Gates Chili Central School District #1	3,675	Monroe	Monroe 2 – Orleans BOCES	Monroe RIC	Mid-West
General Brown Central School District #1	1,347	Jefferson	Jefferson-Lewis-Hamilton-Herkimer-Oneida BOCES	Mohawk RIC	Central Region
Genesee Valley Central School District #2	585	Allegany	Cattaraugus-Allegany-Erie-Wyoming BOCES	Erie RIC	West
Geneseo Central School District #1	911	Livingston	Genesee Valley BOCES (Genesee-Livingston-Steuben-Wyoming)	Wayne-Finger Lakes RIC	Mid-West
Geneva City School District	1,955	Ontario	Ontario-Seneca-Yates-Cayuga-Wayne (Wayne-Finger Lakes) BOCES	Wayne-Finger Lakes RIC	Mid-West
George Junior Republic Union Free School District #27	125	Tompkins	Tompkins-Seneca-Tioga BOCES	Central RIC	Mid-State
Georgetown-South Otselic Central School District #1	254	Chenango	Delaware-Chenango-Madison-Otsego BOCES	South Central RIC	Mid-South
Germantown Central School District #2	447	Columbia	Rensselaer-Columbia-Greene (Questar III) BOCES	Northeastern RIC	Capital District/North Country
Gilbertsville-Mount Upton Central School District #2	298	Otsego	Delaware-Chenango-Madison-Otsego BOCES	South Central RIC	Mid-South
Gilboa-Conesville Central School District #1	239	Schoharie	Otsego-Delaware-Schoharie-Greene (Otsego Northern Catskills) BOCES	South Central RIC	Mid-South
Glen Cove City School District	3,043	Nassau	Nassau BOCES	Nassau RIC	Long Island
Glens Falls City School District	1,954	Warren	Washington-Saratoga-Warren-Hamilton-Essex BOCES	Northeastern RIC	Capital District/North Country
Glens Falls Common School District #18	136	Warren	Washington-Saratoga-Warren-Hamilton-Essex BOCES	Northeastern RIC	Capital District/North Country
Gloversville City School District	2,366	Fulton	Hamilton-Fulton-Montgomery BOCES	Northeastern RIC	Capital District/North Country
Gorham-Middlesex Central School District (Marcus Whitman) #1	1,032	Ontario	Ontario-Seneca-Yates-Cayuga-Wayne (Wayne-Finger Lakes) BOCES	Wayne-Finger Lakes RIC	Mid-West
Goshen Central School District #1	2,759	Orange	Orange-Ulster BOCES	Mid-Hudson RIC	Mid-Hudson
Gouverneur Central School District #1	1,408	Saint Lawrence	Saint Lawrence-Lewis BOCES	Northeastern RIC	Capital District/North Country
Gowanda Central School District #1	1,030	Cattaraugus	Erie 2 Chautauqua-Cattaraugus BOCES	Erie RIC	West
Grand Island Central School District #1	2,905	Erie	Erie 1 BOCES	Erie RIC	West
Granville Central School District #1	963	Washington	Washington-Saratoga-Warren-Hamilton-Essex BOCES	Northeastern RIC	Capital District/North Country
Great Neck Union Free School District #7	6,658	Nassau	Nassau BOCES	Nassau RIC	Long Island
Greece Central School District #1	10,000	Monroe	Monroe 2 – Orleans BOCES	Monroe RIC	Mid-West
Green Island Union Free School District #1	163	Albany	Albany-Schoharie-Schenectady-Saratoga (Capital Region) BOCES	Northeastern RIC	Capital District/North Country
Greenburgh Central School District #7	1,607	Westchester	Westchester (Southern Westchester) BOCES	Lower Hudson RIC	Lower Hudson Valley
Greenburgh Eleven Union Free School District	119	Westchester	Westchester (Southern Westchester) BOCES	Lower Hudson RIC	Lower Hudson Valley
Greenburgh-Graham Union Free School District #10	223	Westchester	Westchester (Southern Westchester) BOCES	Lower Hudson RIC	Lower Hudson Valley
Greenburgh-North Castle Union Free School District #12	470	Westchester	Westchester (Southern Westchester) BOCES	Lower Hudson RIC	Lower Hudson Valley
Greene Central School District #1	905	Chenango	Delaware-Chenango-Madison-Otsego BOCES	South Central RIC	Mid-South
Greenport Union Free School District #10	641	Suffolk	Eastern Suffolk (Suffolk-1) BOCES	Suffolk RIC	Long Island
Greenville Central School District #1	1,060	Greene	Rensselaer-Columbia-Greene (Questar III) BOCES	Northeastern RIC	Capital District/North Country
Greenwich Central School District #1	846	Washington	Washington-Saratoga-Warren-Hamilton-Essex BOCES	Northeastern RIC	Capital District/North Country
Greenwood Lake Union Free School District #11	407	Orange	Orange-Ulster BOCES	Mid-Hudson RIC	Mid-Hudson
Groton Central School District #1	773	Tompkins	Tompkins-Seneca-Tioga BOCES	Central RIC	Mid-State
Guilderland Central School District #2	4,910	Albany	Albany-Schoharie-Schenectady-Saratoga (Capital Region) BOCES	Northeastern RIC	Capital District/North Country
Hadley-Luzerne Central School District #1	622	Warren	Washington-Saratoga-Warren-Hamilton-Essex BOCES	Northeastern RIC	Capital District/North Country
Haldane Central School District #1	783	Putnam	Putnam-Westchester (Putnam-Northern Westchester) BOCES	Lower Hudson RIC	Lower Hudson Valley
Half Hollow Hills Central School District #5	7,312	Suffolk	Western Suffolk (Suffolk-3) BOCES	Suffolk RIC	Long Island
Hamburg Central School District #1	3,259	Erie	Erie 1 BOCES	Erie RIC	West
Hamilton Central School District #1	520	Madison	Madison-Oneida BOCES	Mohawk RIC	Central Region
Hammond Central School District #1	234	Saint Lawrence	Saint Lawrence-Lewis BOCES	Northeastern RIC	Capital District/North Country
Hammondsport Central School District #1	365	Steuben	Schuyler-Steuben-Chemung-Tioga-Allegany (Greater Southern Tier) BOCES	Greater Southern Tier RIC	Mid-South
Hampton Bays Union Free School District #5	1974	Suffolk	Eastern Suffolk (Suffolk-1) BOCES	Suffolk RIC	Long Island
Hancock Central School District #6	298	Delaware	Delaware-Chenango-Madison-Otsego BOCES	South Central RIC	Mid-South
Hannibal Central School District #1	1,203	Oswego	Oswego BOCES (CiTi: Center for Instruction, Technology & Innovation)	Central RIC	Mid-State
Harborfields Central School District #6	2,756	Suffolk	Western Suffolk (Suffolk-3) BOCES	Suffolk RIC	Long Island
Harpursville Central School District #1	584	Broome	Broome-Tioga BOCES	South Central RIC	Mid-South
Harrison Central School District #1	3,805	Westchester	Westchester (Southern Westchester) BOCES	Lower Hudson RIC	Lower Hudson Valley
Harrisville Central School District #1	289	Lewis	Saint Lawrence-Lewis BOCES	Northeastern RIC	Capital District/North Country
Hartford Central School District #1	330	Washington	Washington-Saratoga-Warren-Hamilton-Essex BOCES	Northeastern RIC	Capital District/North Country
Hastings-on-Hudson Union Free School District #4	1,578	Westchester	Westchester (Southern Westchester) BOCES	Lower Hudson RIC	Lower Hudson Valley
Hauppauge Union Free School District #6	3,240	Suffolk	Eastern Suffolk (Suffolk-1) BOCES	Suffolk RIC	Long Island
Haverstraw-Stony Point Central School District (North Rockland) #1	8,073	Rockland	Rockland BOCES	Lower Hudson RIC	Lower Hudson Valley
Hawthorne-Cedar Knolls Union Free School District #3	215	Westchester	Westchester (Southern Westchester) BOCES	Lower Hudson RIC	Lower Hudson Valley
Hempstead Union Free School District #1	4,676	Nassau	Nassau BOCES	Nassau RIC	Long Island
Hendrick Hudson Central School District #3	2,216	Westchester	Putnam-Westchester (Putnam-Northern Westchester) BOCES	Lower Hudson RIC	Lower Hudson Valley
Herkimer Central School District #1	1,109	Herkimer	Herkimer-Fulton-Hamilton-Otsego BOCES	Mohawk RIC	Central Region
Hermon-DeKalb Central School District #1	367	Saint Lawrence	Saint Lawrence-Lewis BOCES	Northeastern RIC	Capital District/North Country
Herricks Union Free School District #9	4,359	Nassau	Nassau BOCES	Nassau RIC	Long Island
Heuvelton Central School District #4	502	Saint Lawrence	Saint Lawrence-Lewis BOCES	Northeastern RIC	Capital District/North Country
Hewlett-Woodmere Union Free School District #14	2,653	Nassau	Nassau BOCES	Nassau RIC	Long Island
Hicksville Union Free School District #17	5,381	Nassau	Nassau BOCES	Nassau RIC	Long Island
Highland Central School District #3	1,554	Ulster	Ulster BOCES	Mid-Hudson RIC	Mid-Hudson
Highland Falls Central School District #1	867	Orange	Orange-Ulster BOCES	Mid-Hudson RIC	Mid-Hudson
Hilton Central School District #1	4,093	Monroe	Monroe 2 – Orleans BOCES	Monroe RIC	Mid-West
Hinsdale Central School District #1	326	Cattaraugus	Cattaraugus-Allegany-Erie-Wyoming BOCES	Erie RIC	West
Holland Central School District #1	740	Erie	Erie 2 Chautauqua-Cattaraugus BOCES	Erie RIC	West
Holland Patent Central School District #1	1,182	Oneida	Oneida-Herkimer-Madison BOCES	Mohawk RIC	Central Region
Holley Central School District #4	910	Orleans	Monroe 2 – Orleans BOCES	Monroe RIC	Mid-West
Homer Central School District #1	1,810	Cortland	Onondaga-Cortland-Madison BOCES	Central RIC	Mid-State
Honeoye Central School District #1	499	Ontario	Ontario-Seneca-Yates-Cayuga-Wayne (Wayne-Finger Lakes) BOCES	Wayne-Finger Lakes RIC	Mid-West
Honeoye Falls-Lima Central School District #1	2,101	Monroe	Monroe 1 BOCES	Monroe RIC	Mid-West
Hoosic Valley Central School District #1	838	Rensselaer	Rensselaer-Columbia-Greene (Questar III) BOCES	Northeastern RIC	Capital District/North Country
Hoosick Falls Central School District #1 (not BOCES)	1,082	Rensselaer	Rensselaer-Columbia-Greene (Questar III) BOCES	Northeastern RIC	Capital District/North Country
Hopevale Union Free School District at Hamburg #3	0	Erie	Erie 1 BOCES	Erie RIC	West
Hornell City School District	1,482	Steuben	Schuyler-Steuben-Chemung-Tioga-Allegany (Greater Southern Tier) BOCES	Greater Southern Tier RIC	Mid-South
Horseheads Central School District #1	3,578	Chemung	Schuyler-Steuben-Chemung-Tioga-Allegany (Greater Southern Tier) BOCES	Greater Southern Tier RIC	Mid-South
Hudson City School District	1,491	Columbia	Rensselaer-Columbia-Greene (Questar III) BOCES	Northeastern RIC	Capital District/North Country
Hudson Falls Central School District #1	2,036	Washington	Washington-Saratoga-Warren-Hamilton-Essex BOCES	Northeastern RIC	Capital District/North Country
Hunter-Tannersville Central School District #1	329	Greene	Otsego-Delaware-Schoharie-Greene (Otsego Northern Catskills) BOCES	South Central RIC	Mid-South
Huntington Union Free School District #3	4,043	Suffolk	Western Suffolk (Suffolk-3) BOCES	Suffolk RIC	Long Island
Hyde Park Central School District #1	3,416	Dutchess	Dutchess BOCES	Mid-Hudson RIC	Mid-Hudson
Indian Lake Central School District #1	126	Hamilton	Washington-Saratoga-Warren-Hamilton-Essex BOCES	Northeastern RIC	Capital District/North Country
Indian River Central School District #1	3,462	Jefferson	Jefferson-Lewis-Hamilton-Herkimer-Oneida BOCES	Mohawk RIC	Central Region
Inlet Common School District #1	0	Hamilton	Jefferson-Lewis-Hamilton-Herkimer-Oneida BOCES	Mohawk RIC	Central Region
Iroquois Central School District #1	2,049	Erie	Erie 2 Chautauqua-Cattaraugus BOCES	Erie RIC	West
Irvington Union Free School District #2	1,672	Westchester	Westchester (Southern Westchester) BOCES	Lower Hudson RIC	Lower Hudson Valley
Island Park Union Free School District #31	740	Nassau	Nassau BOCES	Nassau RIC	Long Island
Island Trees Union Free School District #26	2,342	Nassau	Nassau BOCES	Nassau RIC	Long Island
Islip Union Free School District #2	2,712	Suffolk	Eastern Suffolk (Suffolk-1) BOCES	Suffolk RIC	Long Island
Ithaca City School District	4,903	Tompkins	Tompkins-Seneca-Tioga BOCES	Central RIC	Mid-State
Jamestown City School District	4,425	Chautauqua	Erie 2 Chautauqua-Cattaraugus BOCES	Erie RIC	West
Jamesville-DeWitt Central School District #11	2,414	Onondaga	Onondaga-Cortland-Madison BOCES	Central RIC	Mid-State
Jasper-Troupsburg Central School District #2	375	Steuben	Schuyler-Steuben-Chemung-Tioga-Allegany (Greater Southern Tier) BOCES	Greater Southern Tier RIC	Mid-South
Jefferson Central School District #1	121	Schoharie	Otsego-Delaware-Schoharie-Greene (Otsego Northern Catskills) BOCES	South Central RIC	Mid-South
Jericho Union Free School District #15	3,170	Nassau	Nassau BOCES	Nassau RIC	Long Island
Johnsburg Central School District #1	232	Warren	Washington-Saratoga-Warren-Hamilton-Essex BOCES	Northeastern RIC	Capital District/North Country
Johnson City Central School District #2	2,329	Broome	Broome-Tioga BOCES	South Central RIC	Mid-South
Johnstown City School District	1,449	Fulton	Hamilton-Fulton-Montgomery BOCES	Northeastern RIC	Capital District/North Country
Jordan-Elbridge Central School District #1	1,101	Onondaga	Cayuga-Onondaga BOCES	Central RIC	Mid-State
Katonah-Lewisboro Union Free School District #1	2,792	Westchester	Putnam-Westchester (Putnam-Northern Westchester) BOCES	Lower Hudson RIC	Lower Hudson Valley
Keene Central School District #1	168	Essex	Clinton-Essex-Warren-Washington BOCES (Champlain Valley Educational Services)	Northeastern RIC	Capital District/North Country
Kendall Central School District #7	654	Orleans	Monroe 2 – Orleans BOCES	Monroe RIC	Mid-West
Kenmore-Town of Tonawanda School District #1	6,598	Erie	Erie 1 BOCES	Erie RIC	West
Kinderhook Central School District #1	1,631	Columbia	Rensselaer-Columbia-Greene (Questar III) BOCES	Northeastern RIC	Capital District/North Country
Kings Park Central School District #5	2,629	Suffolk	Western Suffolk (Suffolk-3) BOCES	Suffolk RIC	Long Island
Kingston City School District	5,865	Ulster	Ulster BOCES	Mid-Hudson RIC	Mid-Hudson
Kiryas Joel Village Union Free School District #2	622	Orange	Orange-Ulster BOCES	Mid-Hudson RIC	Mid-Hudson
La Fargeville Central School District #1	440	Jefferson	Jefferson-Lewis-Hamilton-Herkimer-Oneida BOCES	Mohawk RIC	Central Region
Lackawanna City School District	2,137	Erie	Erie 1 BOCES	Erie RIC	West
LaFayette Central School District #7	741	Onondaga	Onondaga-Cortland-Madison BOCES	Central RIC	Mid-State
Lake George Central School District #1	575	Warren	Washington-Saratoga-Warren-Hamilton-Essex BOCES	Northeastern RIC	Capital District/North Country
Lake Placid Central School District #2	573	Essex	Franklin-Essex-Hamilton BOCES	Northeastern RIC	Capital District/North Country
Lake Pleasant Central School District #1	60	Hamilton	Hamilton-Fulton-Montgomery BOCES	Northeastern RIC	Capital District/North Country
Lakeland Central School District #1	5,211	Westchester	Putnam-Westchester (Putnam-Northern Westchester) BOCES	Lower Hudson RIC	Lower Hudson Valley
Lancaster Central School District #1	5,510	Erie	Erie 1 BOCES	Erie RIC	West
Lansing Central School District #1	1,055	Tompkins	Tompkins-Seneca-Tioga BOCES	Central RIC	Mid-State
Lansingburgh Central School District #1	2,140	Rensselaer	Rensselaer-Columbia-Greene (Questar III) BOCES	Northeastern RIC	Capital District/North Country
Laurens Central School District #1	275	Otsego	Otsego-Delaware-Schoharie-Greene (Otsego Northern Catskills) BOCES	South Central RIC	Mid-South
Lawrence Union Free School District #15	2,266	Nassau	Nassau BOCES	Nassau RIC	Long Island
Le Roy Central School District #1	1,084	Genesee	Genesee Valley BOCES (Genesee-Livingston-Steuben-Wyoming)	Wayne-Finger Lakes RIC	Mid-West
Letchworth Central School District #1	838	Wyoming	Genesee Valley BOCES (Genesee-Livingston-Steuben-Wyoming)	Wayne-Finger Lakes RIC	Mid-West
Levittown Union Free School District #5	7,358	Nassau	Nassau BOCES	Nassau RIC	Long Island
Lewiston-Porter Central School District #1	1,997	Niagara	Orleans-Niagara BOCES	Erie RIC	West
Liberty Central School District #1	1,749	Sullivan	Sullivan BOCES	Mid-Hudson RIC	Mid-Hudson
Lindenhurst Union Free School District #4	5,878	Suffolk	Western Suffolk (Suffolk-3) BOCES	Suffolk RIC	Long Island
Lisbon Central School District #2	522	Saint Lawrence	Saint Lawrence-Lewis BOCES	Northeastern RIC	Capital District/North Country
Little Falls City School District	1,003	Herkimer	Herkimer-Fulton-Hamilton-Otsego BOCES	Mohawk RIC	Central Region
Little Flower Union Free School District #3	99	Suffolk	Eastern Suffolk (Suffolk-1) BOCES	Suffolk RIC	Long Island
Liverpool Central School District #1	6,868	Onondaga	Onondaga-Cortland-Madison BOCES	Central RIC	Mid-State
Livonia Central School District #1	1,324	Livingston	Genesee Valley BOCES (Genesee-Livingston-Steuben-Wyoming)	Wayne-Finger Lakes RIC	Mid-West
Lockport City School District	4,151	Niagara	Orleans-Niagara BOCES	Erie RIC	West
Locust Valley Central School District #3	1,764	Nassau	Nassau BOCES	Nassau RIC	Long Island
Long Beach City School District	3,420	Nassau	Nassau BOCES	Nassau RIC	Long Island
Long Lake Central School District #1	61	Hamilton	Franklin-Essex-Hamilton BOCES	Northeastern RIC	Capital District/North Country
Longwood Central School District #12	9,066	Suffolk	Eastern Suffolk (Suffolk-1) BOCES	Suffolk RIC	Long Island
Lowville Academy & Central School District #1	1,240	Lewis	Jefferson-Lewis-Hamilton-Herkimer-Oneida BOCES	Mohawk RIC	Central Region
Lyme Central School District #1	310	Jefferson	Jefferson-Lewis-Hamilton-Herkimer-Oneida BOCES	Mohawk RIC	Central Region
Lynbrook Union Free School District #20	2,845	Nassau	Nassau BOCES	Nassau RIC	Long Island
Lyncourt Union Free School District #4	421	Onondaga	Onondaga-Cortland-Madison BOCES	Central RIC	Mid-State
Lyndonville Central School District #1	619	Orleans	Orleans-Niagara BOCES	Erie RIC	West
Lyons Central School District #1	889	Wayne	Ontario-Seneca-Yates-Cayuga-Wayne (Wayne-Finger Lakes) BOCES	Wayne-Finger Lakes RIC	Mid-West
Madison Central School District #1	433	Madison	Madison-Oneida BOCES	Mohawk RIC	Central Region
Madrid-Waddington Central School District #1	615	Saint Lawrence	Saint Lawrence-Lewis BOCES	Northeastern RIC	Capital District/North Country
Mahopac Central School District #1	4,013	Putnam	Putnam-Westchester (Putnam-Northern Westchester) BOCES	Lower Hudson RIC	Lower Hudson Valley
Maine-Endwell Central School District #1	2,594	Broome	Broome-Tioga BOCES	South Central RIC	Mid-South
Malone Central School District #1	2,027	Franklin	Franklin-Essex-Hamilton BOCES	Northeastern RIC	Capital District/North Country
Malverne Union Free School District #12	1,799	Nassau	Nassau BOCES	Nassau RIC	Long Island
Mamaroneck Union Free School District #1 (not BOCES)	5,525	Westchester	Westchester (Southern Westchester) BOCES	Lower Hudson RIC	Lower Hudson Valley
Manchester-Shortsville Central School District (Red Jacket) #1	671	Ontario	Ontario-Seneca-Yates-Cayuga-Wayne (Wayne-Finger Lakes) BOCES	Wayne-Finger Lakes RIC	Mid-West
Manhasset Union Free School District #6	2,891	Nassau	Nassau BOCES	Nassau RIC	Long Island
Marathon Central School District #1	664	Cortland	Onondaga-Cortland-Madison BOCES	Central RIC	Mid-State
Marcellus Central School District #1	1,418	Onondaga	Onondaga-Cortland-Madison BOCES	Central RIC	Mid-State
Margaretville Central School District #1	293	Delaware	Otsego-Delaware-Schoharie-Greene (Otsego Northern Catskills) BOCES	South Central RIC	Mid-South
Marion Central School District #1	603	Wayne	Ontario-Seneca-Yates-Cayuga-Wayne (Wayne-Finger Lakes) BOCES	Wayne-Finger Lakes RIC	Mid-West
Marlboro Central School District #1	1,901	Ulster	Orange-Ulster BOCES	Mid-Hudson RIC	Mid-Hudson
Massapequa Union Free School District #23	6,497	Nassau	Nassau BOCES	Nassau RIC	Long Island
Massena Central School District #1	2,423	Saint Lawrence	Saint Lawrence-Lewis BOCES	Northeastern RIC	Capital District/North Country
Mattituck-Cutchogue Union Free School District #12	987	Suffolk	Eastern Suffolk (Suffolk-1) BOCES	Suffolk RIC	Long Island
Mayfield Central School District #1	804	Fulton	Hamilton-Fulton-Montgomery BOCES	Northeastern RIC	Capital District/North Country
McGraw Central School District #4	475	Cortland	Onondaga-Cortland-Madison BOCES	Central RIC	Mid-State
Mechanicville City School District	1,269	Saratoga	Washington-Saratoga-Warren-Hamilton-Essex BOCES	Northeastern RIC	Capital District/North Country
Medina Central School District #1	1,335	Orleans	Orleans-Niagara BOCES	Erie RIC	West
Menands Union Free School District #15	305	Albany	Albany-Schoharie-Schenectady-Saratoga (Capital Region) BOCES	Northeastern RIC	Capital District/North Country
Merrick Union Free School District #25	1,728	Nassau	Nassau BOCES	Nassau RIC	Long Island
Mexico Central School District #1	2,020	Oswego	Oswego BOCES (CiTi: Center for Instruction, Technology & Innovation)	Central RIC	Mid-State
Middle Country Central School District #11	9,187	Suffolk	Eastern Suffolk (Suffolk-1) BOCES	Suffolk RIC	Long Island
Middleburgh Central School District #1	623	Schoharie	Albany-Schoharie-Schenectady-Saratoga (Capital Region) BOCES	Northeastern RIC	Capital District/North Country
Middletown City School District	7,242	Orange	Orange-Ulster BOCES	Mid-Hudson RIC	Mid-Hudson
Milford Central School District #1	306	Otsego	Otsego-Delaware-Schoharie-Greene (Otsego Northern Catskills) BOCES	South Central RIC	Mid-South
Millbrook Central School District #1	708	Dutchess	Dutchess BOCES	Mid-Hudson RIC	Mid-Hudson
Miller Place Union Free School District #8	2,251	Suffolk	Eastern Suffolk (Suffolk-1) BOCES	Suffolk RIC	Long Island
Mineola Union Free School District #10	2,880	Nassau	Nassau BOCES	Nassau RIC	Long Island
Minerva Central School District #1	104	Essex	Washington-Saratoga-Warren-Hamilton-Essex BOCES	Northeastern RIC	Capital District/North Country
Minisink Valley Central School District #1	3,536	Orange	Orange-Ulster BOCES	Mid-Hudson RIC	Mid-Hudson
Monroe-Woodbury Central School District #1	6,243	Orange	Orange-Ulster BOCES	Mid-Hudson RIC	Mid-Hudson
Montauk Union Free School District #6	288	Suffolk	Eastern Suffolk (Suffolk-1) BOCES	Suffolk RIC	Long Island
Monticello Central School District #1	2,717	Sullivan	Sullivan BOCES	Mid-Hudson RIC	Mid-Hudson
Moravia Central School District #1	849	Cayuga	Cayuga-Onondaga BOCES	Central RIC	Mid-State
Moriah Central School District #1	633	Essex	Clinton-Essex-Warren-Washington BOCES (Champlain Valley Educational Services)	Northeastern RIC	Capital District/North Country
Morris Central School District #1	323	Otsego	Otsego-Delaware-Schoharie-Greene (Otsego Northern Catskills) BOCES	South Central RIC	Mid-South
Morristown Central School District #1	302	Saint Lawrence	Saint Lawrence-Lewis BOCES	Northeastern RIC	Capital District/North Country
Morrisville-Eaton Central School District #1	595	Madison	Madison-Oneida BOCES	Mohawk RIC	Central Region
Mount Markham Central School District #1	1,006	Herkimer	Herkimer-Fulton-Hamilton-Otsego BOCES	Mohawk RIC	Central Region
Mount Morris Central School District #1	503	Livingston	Genesee Valley BOCES (Genesee-Livingston-Steuben-Wyoming)	Wayne-Finger Lakes RIC	Mid-West
Mount Pleasant Central School District #1	2,021	Westchester	Westchester (Southern Westchester) BOCES	Lower Hudson RIC	Lower Hudson Valley
Mount Pleasant-Blythedale Union Free School District #6	137	Westchester	Westchester (Southern Westchester) BOCES	Lower Hudson RIC	Lower Hudson Valley
Mount Pleasant-Cottage Union Free School District #4	237	Westchester	Westchester (Southern Westchester) BOCES	Lower Hudson RIC	Lower Hudson Valley
Mount Sinai Union Free School District #7	1,954	Suffolk	Eastern Suffolk (Suffolk-1) BOCES	Suffolk RIC	Long Island
Mount Vernon School District	6,414	Westchester	Westchester (Southern Westchester) BOCES	Lower Hudson RIC	Lower Hudson Valley
Nanuet Union Free School District #8	2,116	Rockland	Rockland BOCES	Lower Hudson RIC	Lower Hudson Valley
Naples Central School District #1	548	Ontario	Ontario-Seneca-Yates-Cayuga-Wayne (Wayne-Finger Lakes) BOCES	Wayne-Finger Lakes RIC	Mid-West
New Hartford Central School District #1	2,413	Oneida	Oneida-Herkimer-Madison BOCES	Mohawk RIC	Central Region
New Hyde Park-Garden City Park Union Free School District #5	1,523	Nassau	Nassau BOCES	Nassau RIC	Long Island
New Lebanon Central School District #1	385	Columbia	Rensselaer-Columbia-Greene (Questar III) BOCES	Northeastern RIC	Capital District/North Country
New Paltz Central School District #1	1,684	Ulster	Ulster BOCES	Mid-Hudson RIC	Mid-Hudson
New Rochelle City School District	10,119	Westchester	Westchester (Southern Westchester) BOCES	Lower Hudson RIC	Lower Hudson Valley
New Suffolk Common School District #15	0	Suffolk	Eastern Suffolk (Suffolk-1) BOCES	Suffolk RIC	Long Island
New York City Department of Education (not BOCES)	874,471	Bronx; Kings; New York; Queens; Richmond	New York City	New York City	New York City
New York Mills Union Free School District #4	522	Oneida	Oneida-Herkimer-Madison BOCES	Mohawk RIC	Central Region
Newark Central School District #1	1,768	Wayne	Ontario-Seneca-Yates-Cayuga-Wayne (Wayne-Finger Lakes) BOCES	Wayne-Finger Lakes RIC	Mid-West
Newark Valley Central School District #2	963	Tioga	Broome-Tioga BOCES	South Central RIC	Mid-South
Newburgh City School District (not BOCES)	10,543	Orange	Orange-Ulster BOCES	Mid-Hudson RIC	Mid-Hudson
Newcomb Central School District #1	40	Essex	Washington-Saratoga-Warren-Hamilton-Essex BOCES	Northeastern RIC	Capital District/North Country
Newfane Central School District #1	1,266	Niagara	Orleans-Niagara BOCES	Erie RIC	West
Newfield Central School District #1	610	Tompkins	Tompkins-Seneca-Tioga BOCES	Central RIC	Mid-State
Niagara Falls City School District	6,494	Niagara	Orleans-Niagara BOCES	Erie RIC	West
Niagara-Wheatfield Central School District #1	3,166	Niagara	Orleans-Niagara BOCES	Erie RIC	West
Niskayuna Central School District #1	4,277	Schenectady	Albany-Schoharie-Schenectady-Saratoga (Capital Region) BOCES	Northeastern RIC	Capital District/North Country
North Babylon Union Free School District #3	4,527	Suffolk	Western Suffolk (Suffolk-3) BOCES	Suffolk RIC	Long Island
North Bellmore Union Free School District #4	2,327	Nassau	Nassau BOCES	Nassau RIC	Long Island
North Collins Central School District #1	539	Erie	Erie 2 Chautauqua-Cattaraugus BOCES	Erie RIC	West
North Colonie Central School District #23	6,188	Albany	Albany-Schoharie-Schenectady-Saratoga (Capital Region) BOCES	Northeastern RIC	Capital District/North Country
North Greenbush Common School District (Williams) #1	35	Rensselaer	Rensselaer-Columbia-Greene (Questar III) BOCES	Northeastern RIC	Capital District/North Country
North Merrick Union Free School District #29	1,346	Nassau	Nassau BOCES	Nassau RIC	Long Island
North Rose-Wolcott Central School District #1	1,065	Wayne	Ontario-Seneca-Yates-Cayuga-Wayne (Wayne-Finger Lakes) BOCES	Wayne-Finger Lakes RIC	Mid-West
North Salem Central School District #1	990	Westchester	Putnam-Westchester (Putnam-Northern Westchester) BOCES	Lower Hudson RIC	Lower Hudson Valley
North Shore Central School District #1	2,685	Nassau	Nassau BOCES	Nassau RIC	Long Island
North Syracuse Central School District #3	7,801	Onondaga	Onondaga-Cortland-Madison BOCES	Central RIC	Mid-State
North Tonawanda City School District	3,227	Niagara	Orleans-Niagara BOCES	Erie RIC	West
North Warren Central School District #2	431	Warren	Washington-Saratoga-Warren-Hamilton-Essex BOCES	Northeastern RIC	Capital District/North Country
Northeast Central School District #1	646	Dutchess	Dutchess BOCES	Mid-Hudson RIC	Mid-Hudson
Northeastern Clinton Central School District #1	1,194	Clinton	Clinton-Essex-Warren-Washington BOCES (Champlain Valley Educational Services)	Northeastern RIC	Capital District/North Country
Northern Adirondack Central School District #1	782	Clinton	Clinton-Essex-Warren-Washington BOCES (Champlain Valley Educational Services)	Northeastern RIC	Capital District/North Country
Northport-East Northport Union Free School District #4	4,315	Suffolk	Western Suffolk (Suffolk-3) BOCES	Suffolk RIC	Long Island
Northville Central School District #1	403	Fulton	Hamilton-Fulton-Montgomery BOCES	Northeastern RIC	Capital District/North Country
Norwich City School District	1,595	Chenango	Delaware-Chenango-Madison-Otsego BOCES	South Central RIC	Mid-South
Norwood-Norfolk Central School District #1	866	Saint Lawrence	Saint Lawrence-Lewis BOCES	Northeastern RIC	Capital District/North Country
Nyack Union Free School District #4	2,928	Rockland	Rockland BOCES	Lower Hudson RIC	Lower Hudson Valley
Oakfield-Alabama Central School District #1	654	Genesee	Genesee Valley BOCES (Genesee-Livingston-Steuben-Wyoming)	Wayne-Finger Lakes RIC	Mid-West
Oceanside Union Free School District #11	5,412	Nassau	Nassau BOCES	Nassau RIC	Long Island
Odessa-Montour Central School District #1	692	Schuyler	Schuyler-Steuben-Chemung-Tioga-Allegany (Greater Southern Tier) BOCES	Greater Southern Tier RIC	Mid-South
Ogdensburg City School District	1,303	Saint Lawrence	Saint Lawrence-Lewis BOCES	Northeastern RIC	Capital District/North Country
Olean City School District	1,776	Cattaraugus	Cattaraugus-Allegany-Erie-Wyoming BOCES	Erie RIC	West
Oneida City School District	1,643	Madison	Madison-Oneida BOCES	Mohawk RIC	Central Region
Oneonta City School District	1,739	Otsego	Otsego-Delaware-Schoharie-Greene (Otsego Northern Catskills) BOCES	South Central RIC	Mid-South
Onondaga Central School District #1	732	Onondaga	Onondaga-Cortland-Madison BOCES	Central RIC	Mid-State
Onteora Central School District #1	1,048	Ulster	Ulster BOCES	Mid-Hudson RIC	Mid-Hudson
Oppenheim-Ephratah-St. Johnsville Central School District #1	699	Montgomery	Hamilton-Fulton-Montgomery BOCES	Northeastern RIC	Capital District/North Country
Orchard Park Central School District #1	4,848	Erie	Erie 2 Chautauqua-Cattaraugus BOCES	Erie RIC	West
Oriskany Central School District #1	548	Oneida	Oneida-Herkimer-Madison BOCES	Mohawk RIC	Central Region
Ossining Union Free School District #1	4,848	Westchester	Putnam-Westchester (Putnam-Northern Westchester) BOCES	Lower Hudson RIC	Lower Hudson Valley
Oswego City School District	3,525	Oswego	Oswego BOCES (CiTi: Center for Instruction, Technology & Innovation)	Central RIC	Mid-State
Otego-Unadilla Central School District #1	737	Otsego	Delaware-Chenango-Madison-Otsego BOCES	South Central RIC	Mid-South
Owego-Apalachin Central School District #1	1,891	Tioga	Broome-Tioga BOCES	South Central RIC	Mid-South
Oxford Academy and Central School District #1	672	Chenango	Delaware-Chenango-Madison-Otsego BOCES	South Central RIC	Mid-South
Oyster Bay-East Norwich Central School District #6	1,354	Nassau	Nassau BOCES	Nassau RIC	Long Island
Oysterponds Union Free School District #2	84	Suffolk	Eastern Suffolk (Suffolk-1) BOCES	Suffolk RIC	Long Island
Palmyra-Macedon Central School District #1	1,630	Wayne	Ontario-Seneca-Yates-Cayuga-Wayne (Wayne-Finger Lakes) BOCES	Wayne-Finger Lakes RIC	Mid-West
Panama Central School District #1	385	Chautauqua	Erie 2 Chautauqua-Cattaraugus BOCES	Erie RIC	West
Parishville-Hopkinton Central School District #1	325	Saint Lawrence	Saint Lawrence-Lewis BOCES	Northeastern RIC	Capital District/North Country
Patchogue-Medford (Brookhaven) Union Free School District #24	7,613	Suffolk	Eastern Suffolk (Suffolk-1) BOCES	Suffolk RIC	Long Island
Pavilion Central School District #1	613	Genesee	Genesee Valley BOCES (Genesee-Livingston-Steuben-Wyoming)	Wayne-Finger Lakes RIC	Mid-West
Pawling Central School District #1	1,108	Dutchess	Dutchess BOCES	Mid-Hudson RIC	Mid-Hudson
Pearl River Union Free School District #8	2,204	Rockland	Rockland BOCES	Lower Hudson RIC	Lower Hudson Valley
Peekskill City School District	3,631	Westchester	Putnam-Westchester (Putnam-Northern Westchester) BOCES	Lower Hudson RIC	Lower Hudson Valley
Pelham Union Free School District #1	2,819	Westchester	Westchester (Southern Westchester) BOCES	Lower Hudson RIC	Lower Hudson Valley
Pembroke Central School District #2	916	Genesee	Genesee Valley BOCES (Genesee-Livingston-Steuben-Wyoming)	Wayne-Finger Lakes RIC	Mid-West
Penfield Central School District #1	4,793	Monroe	Monroe 1 BOCES	Monroe RIC	Mid-West
Penn Yan Central School District #1	1,344	Yates	Ontario-Seneca-Yates-Cayuga-Wayne (Wayne-Finger Lakes) BOCES	Wayne-Finger Lakes RIC	Mid-West
Perry Central School District #1	736	Wyoming	Genesee Valley BOCES (Genesee-Livingston-Steuben-Wyoming)	Wayne-Finger Lakes RIC	Mid-West
Peru Central School District #1	1,732	Clinton	Clinton-Essex-Warren-Washington BOCES (Champlain Valley Educational Services)	Northeastern RIC	Capital District/North Country
Phelps-Clifton Springs Central School District #1	1,446	Ontario	Ontario-Seneca-Yates-Cayuga-Wayne (Wayne-Finger Lakes) BOCES	Wayne-Finger Lakes RIC	Mid-West
Phoenix Central School District #1	1,623	Oswego	Oswego BOCES (CiTi: Center for Instruction, Technology & Innovation)	Central RIC	Mid-State
Pine Bush Central School District #1	4,617	Orange	Orange-Ulster BOCES	Mid-Hudson RIC	Mid-Hudson
Pine Plains Central School District #1	787	Dutchess	Dutchess BOCES	Mid-Hudson RIC	Mid-Hudson
Pine Valley Central School District (South Dayton) #1	524	Chautauqua	Erie 2 Chautauqua-Cattaraugus BOCES	Erie RIC	West
Piseco Common School District #1	0	Hamilton	Hamilton-Fulton-Montgomery BOCES	Northeastern RIC	Capital District/North Country
Pittsford Central School District #1	5,522	Monroe	Monroe 1 BOCES	Monroe RIC	Mid-West
Plainedge Union Free School District #18	2,965	Nassau	Nassau BOCES	Nassau RIC	Long Island
Plainview-Old Bethpage Central School District #4	5,545	Nassau	Nassau BOCES	Nassau RIC	Long Island
Plattsburgh City School District	1,780	Clinton	Clinton-Essex-Warren-Washington BOCES (Champlain Valley Educational Services)	Northeastern RIC	Capital District/North Country
Pleasantville Union Free School District #9	1,655	Westchester	Westchester (Southern Westchester) BOCES	Lower Hudson RIC	Lower Hudson Valley
Pocantico Hills Central School District #2	302	Westchester	Westchester (Southern Westchester) BOCES	Lower Hudson RIC	Lower Hudson Valley
Poland Central School District #3	496	Herkimer	Herkimer-Fulton-Hamilton-Otsego BOCES	Mohawk RIC	Central Region
Port Byron Central School District #1	811	Cayuga	Cayuga-Onondaga BOCES	Central RIC	Mid-State
Port Chester-Rye Union Free School District #4	4,291	Westchester	Westchester (Southern Westchester) BOCES	Lower Hudson RIC	Lower Hudson Valley
Port Jefferson Union Free School District #6	876	Suffolk	Eastern Suffolk (Suffolk-1) BOCES	Suffolk RIC	Long Island
Port Jervis City School District	2,325	Orange	Orange-Ulster BOCES	Mid-Hudson RIC	Mid-Hudson
Port Washington Union Free School District #4	5,272	Nassau	Nassau BOCES	Nassau RIC	Long Island
Portville Central School District #1	960	Cattaraugus	Cattaraugus-Allegany-Erie-Wyoming BOCES	Erie RIC	West
Potsdam Central School District #2	1,260	Saint Lawrence	Saint Lawrence-Lewis BOCES	Northeastern RIC	Capital District/North Country
Poughkeepsie City School District	3,692	Dutchess	Dutchess BOCES	Mid-Hudson RIC	Mid-Hudson
Prattsburgh Central School District #1	368	Steuben	Schuyler-Steuben-Chemung-Tioga-Allegany (Greater Southern Tier) BOCES	Greater Southern Tier RIC	Mid-South
Pulaski Central School District #1	904	Oswego	Oswego BOCES (CiTi: Center for Instruction, Technology & Innovation)	Central RIC	Mid-State
Putnam Central School District #1	26	Washington	Clinton-Essex-Warren-Washington BOCES (Champlain Valley Educational Services)	Northeastern RIC	Capital District/North Country
Putnam Valley Central School District #3	1,530	Putnam	Putnam-Westchester (Putnam-Northern Westchester) BOCES	Lower Hudson RIC	Lower Hudson Valley
Queensbury Union Free School District #2	3,018	Warren	Washington-Saratoga-Warren-Hamilton-Essex BOCES	Northeastern RIC	Capital District/North Country
Quogue Union Free School District #3	111	Suffolk	Eastern Suffolk (Suffolk-1) BOCES	Suffolk RIC	Long Island
Randolph Academy Union Free School District #11	151	Cattaraugus	Cattaraugus-Allegany-Erie-Wyoming BOCES	Erie RIC	West
Randolph Central School District #1	814	Cattaraugus	Cattaraugus-Allegany-Erie-Wyoming BOCES	Erie RIC	West
Raquette Lake Union Free School District #2	0	Hamilton	Franklin-Essex-Hamilton BOCES	Northeastern RIC	Capital District/North Country
Ravena-Coeymans-Selkirk Central School District #2	1,729	Albany	Albany-Schoharie-Schenectady-Saratoga (Capital Region) BOCES	Northeastern RIC	Capital District/North Country
Red Creek Central School District #3	740	Wayne	Ontario-Seneca-Yates-Cayuga-Wayne (Wayne-Finger Lakes) BOCES	Wayne-Finger Lakes RIC	Mid-West
Red Hook Central School District #1	1,563	Dutchess	Dutchess BOCES	Mid-Hudson RIC	Mid-Hudson
Remsen Central School District #1	392	Oneida	Oneida-Herkimer-Madison BOCES	Mohawk RIC	Central Region
Remsenburg-Speonk Union Free School District #1	136	Suffolk	Eastern Suffolk (Suffolk-1) BOCES	Suffolk RIC	Long Island
Rensselaer City School District	943	Rensselaer	Rensselaer-Columbia-Greene (Questar III) BOCES	Northeastern RIC	Capital District/North Country
Rhinebeck Central School District #1	924	Dutchess	Dutchess BOCES	Mid-Hudson RIC	Mid-Hudson
Richfield Springs Central School District #1	425	Otsego	Herkimer-Fulton-Hamilton-Otsego BOCES	Mohawk RIC	Central Region
Ripley Central School District #1	167	Chautauqua	Erie 2 Chautauqua-Cattaraugus BOCES	Erie RIC	West
Riverhead Central School District #2	5,427	Suffolk	Eastern Suffolk (Suffolk-1) BOCES	Suffolk RIC	Long Island
Rochester City School District (not BOCES)	22,090	Monroe	Monroe 1 BOCES	Monroe RIC	Mid-West
Rockland Central School District #3	563	Sullivan	Sullivan BOCES	Mid-Hudson RIC	Mid-Hudson
Rockville Centre Union Free School District #21	3380	Nassau	Nassau BOCES	Nassau RIC	Long Island
Rocky Point Union Free School District #9	2,575	Suffolk	Eastern Suffolk (Suffolk-1) BOCES	Suffolk RIC	Long Island
Rome City School District (New York)	5,125	Oneida	Madison-Oneida BOCES	Mohawk RIC	Central Region
Romulus Central School District #3	411	Seneca	Ontario-Seneca-Yates-Cayuga-Wayne (Wayne-Finger Lakes) BOCES	Wayne-Finger Lakes RIC	Mid-West
Rondout Valley Central School District #1	1,683	Ulster	Ulster BOCES	Mid-Hudson RIC	Mid-Hudson
Roosevelt Union Free School District #8	3,007	Nassau	Nassau BOCES	Nassau RIC	Long Island
Roslyn Union Free School District #3	3,372	Nassau	Nassau BOCES	Nassau RIC	Long Island
Rotterdam-Mohonasen Central School District #15	2,685	Schenectady	Albany-Schoharie-Schenectady-Saratoga (Capital Region) BOCES	Northeastern RIC	Capital District/North Country
Roxbury Central School District #2	209	Delaware	Otsego-Delaware-Schoharie-Greene (Otsego Northern Catskills) BOCES	South Central RIC	Mid-South
Royalton-Hartland Central School District #1	1,095	Niagara	Orleans-Niagara BOCES	Erie RIC	West
Rush-Henrietta Central School District #1	5,843	Monroe	Monroe 1 BOCES	Monroe RIC	Mid-West
Rye City School District	2,752	Westchester	Westchester (Southern Westchester) BOCES	Lower Hudson RIC	Lower Hudson Valley
Rye Neck Union Free School District #1	1,382	Westchester	Westchester (Southern Westchester) BOCES	Lower Hudson RIC	Lower Hudson Valley
Sachem Central School District #5	11,819	Suffolk	Eastern Suffolk (Suffolk-1) BOCES	Suffolk RIC	Long Island
Sackets Harbor Central School District #1	423	Jefferson	Jefferson-Lewis-Hamilton-Herkimer-Oneida BOCES	Mohawk RIC	Central Region
Sag Harbor Union Free School District #5	884	Suffolk	Eastern Suffolk (Suffolk-1) BOCES	Suffolk RIC	Long Island
Sagaponack Common School District #10	18	Suffolk	Eastern Suffolk (Suffolk-1) BOCES	Suffolk RIC	Long Island
Saint Regis Falls Central School District #1	175	Franklin	Franklin-Essex-Hamilton BOCES	Northeastern RIC	Capital District/North Country
Salamanca City School District	1,319	Cattaraugus	Cattaraugus-Allegany-Erie-Wyoming BOCES	Erie RIC	West
Salem Central School District #1	527	Washington	Washington-Saratoga-Warren-Hamilton-Essex BOCES	Northeastern RIC	Capital District/North Country
Salmon River Central School District #1	1,374	Franklin	Franklin-Essex-Hamilton BOCES	Northeastern RIC	Capital District/North Country
Sandy Creek Central School District #1	769	Oswego	Oswego BOCES (CiTi: Center for Instruction, Technology & Innovation)	Central RIC	Mid-State
Saranac Central School District #2	1,558	Clinton	Clinton-Essex-Warren-Washington BOCES (Champlain Valley Educational Services)	Northeastern RIC	Capital District/North Country
Saranac Lake Central School District #1	1,024	Franklin	Franklin-Essex-Hamilton BOCES	Northeastern RIC	Capital District/North Country
Saratoga Springs City School District	5,819	Saratoga	Washington-Saratoga-Warren-Hamilton-Essex BOCES	Northeastern RIC	Capital District/North Country
Saugerties Central School District #1	2,295	Ulster	Ulster BOCES	Mid-Hudson RIC	Mid-Hudson
Sauquoit Valley Central School District #3	876	Oneida	Oneida-Herkimer-Madison BOCES	Mohawk RIC	Central Region
Sayville Union Free School District #4	2,531	Suffolk	Eastern Suffolk (Suffolk-1) BOCES	Suffolk RIC	Long Island
Scarsdale Union Free School District #1	4,673	Westchester	Westchester (Southern Westchester) BOCES	Lower Hudson RIC	Lower Hudson Valley
Schalmont Central School District #1	1,809	Schenectady	Albany-Schoharie-Schenectady-Saratoga (Capital Region) BOCES	Northeastern RIC	Capital District/North Country
Schenectady City School District	9,096	Schenectady	Albany-Schoharie-Schenectady-Saratoga (Capital Region) BOCES	Northeastern RIC	Capital District/North Country
Schenevus Central School District #1	234	Otsego	Otsego-Delaware-Schoharie-Greene (Otsego Northern Catskills) BOCES	South Central RIC	Mid-South
Schodack Central School District #1	872	Rensselaer	Rensselaer-Columbia-Greene (Questar III) BOCES	Northeastern RIC	Capital District/North Country
Schoharie Central School District #1	843	Schoharie	Albany-Schoharie-Schenectady-Saratoga (Capital Region) BOCES	Northeastern RIC	Capital District/North Country
Schroon Lake Central School District #1	214	Essex	Clinton-Essex-Warren-Washington BOCES (Champlain Valley Educational Services)	Northeastern RIC	Capital District/North Country
Schuylerville Central School District #1	1,331	Saratoga	Washington-Saratoga-Warren-Hamilton-Essex BOCES	Northeastern RIC	Capital District/North Country
Scio Central School District #1	246	Allegany	Cattaraugus-Allegany-Erie-Wyoming BOCES	Erie RIC	West
Scotia-Glenville Central School District #2	2,054	Schenectady	Albany-Schoharie-Schenectady-Saratoga (Capital Region) BOCES	Northeastern RIC	Capital District/North Country
Seaford Union Free School District #6	2,278	Nassau	Nassau BOCES	Nassau RIC	Long Island
Seneca Falls Central School District #1	1,178	Seneca	Ontario-Seneca-Yates-Cayuga-Wayne (Wayne-Finger Lakes) BOCES	Wayne-Finger Lakes RIC	Mid-West
Sewanhaka Central High School District #2	7,460	Nassau	Nassau BOCES	Nassau RIC	Long Island
Sharon Springs Central School District #1	267	Schoharie	Albany-Schoharie-Schenectady-Saratoga (Capital Region) BOCES	Northeastern RIC	Capital District/North Country
Shelter Island Union Free School District #1	178	Suffolk	Eastern Suffolk (Suffolk-1) BOCES	Suffolk RIC	Long Island
Shenendehowa Central School District #2	9,467	Saratoga	Albany-Schoharie-Schenectady-Saratoga (Capital Region) BOCES	Northeastern RIC	Capital District/North Country
Sherburne-Earlville Central School District #1	1,210	Chenango	Delaware-Chenango-Madison-Otsego BOCES	South Central RIC	Mid-South
Sherman Central School District #1	397	Chautauqua	Erie 2 Chautauqua-Cattaraugus BOCES	Erie RIC	West
Sherrill City School District	1,789	Oneida	Madison-Oneida BOCES	Mohawk RIC	Central Region
Shoreham-Wading River Central School District #1	1,958	Suffolk	Eastern Suffolk (Suffolk-1) BOCES	Suffolk RIC	Long Island
Sidney Central School District #1	978	Delaware	Delaware-Chenango-Madison-Otsego BOCES	South Central RIC	Mid-South
Silver Creek Central School District #1	870	Chautauqua	Erie 2 Chautauqua-Cattaraugus BOCES	Erie RIC	West
Skaneateles Central School District #1	1,188	Onondaga	Cayuga-Onondaga BOCES	Central RIC	Mid-State
Smithtown Central School District #1	7,512	Suffolk	Western Suffolk (Suffolk-3) BOCES	Suffolk RIC	Long Island
Sodus Central School District #1	1,036	Wayne	Ontario-Seneca-Yates-Cayuga-Wayne (Wayne-Finger Lakes) BOCES	Wayne-Finger Lakes RIC	Mid-West
Solvay Union Free School District #2	1,274	Onondaga	Onondaga-Cortland-Madison BOCES	Central RIC	Mid-State
Somers Central School District #1	2,527	Westchester	Putnam-Westchester (Putnam-Northern Westchester) BOCES	Lower Hudson RIC	Lower Hudson Valley
South Colonie Central School District #1	5,137	Albany	Albany-Schoharie-Schenectady-Saratoga (Capital Region) BOCES	Northeastern RIC	Capital District/North Country
South Country Central School District #35	3,772	Suffolk	Eastern Suffolk (Suffolk-1) BOCES	Suffolk RIC	Long Island
South Glens Falls Central School District #1	2,773	Saratoga	Washington-Saratoga-Warren-Hamilton-Essex BOCES	Northeastern RIC	Capital District/North Country
South Huntington Union Free School District #13	5,797	Suffolk	Western Suffolk (Suffolk-3) BOCES	Suffolk RIC	Long Island
South Jefferson Central School District #1	1,743	Jefferson	Jefferson-Lewis-Hamilton-Herkimer-Oneida BOCES	Mohawk RIC	Central Region
South Kortright Central School District #2	263	Delaware	Otsego-Delaware-Schoharie-Greene (Otsego Northern Catskills) BOCES	South Central RIC	Mid-South
South Lewis Central School District #1	1,057	Lewis	Jefferson-Lewis-Hamilton-Herkimer-Oneida BOCES	Mohawk RIC	Central Region
South Mountain-Hickory Common School District at Binghamton #1	0	Broome	Broome-Tioga BOCES	South Central RIC	Mid-South
South Orangetown Central School District #1	2,740	Rockland	Rockland BOCES	Lower Hudson RIC	Lower Hudson Valley
South Seneca Central School District #1	591	Seneca	Tompkins-Seneca-Tioga BOCES	Central RIC	Mid-State
Southampton Union Free School District #6	1,157	Suffolk	Eastern Suffolk (Suffolk-1) BOCES	Suffolk RIC	Long Island
Southern Cayuga Central School District #1	635	Cayuga	Cayuga-Onondaga BOCES	Central RIC	Mid-State
Southold Union Free School District #5	632	Suffolk	Eastern Suffolk (Suffolk-1) BOCES	Suffolk RIC	Long Island
Southwestern Central School District at Jamestown #1	1,274	Chautauqua	Erie 2 Chautauqua-Cattaraugus BOCES	Erie RIC	West
Spackenkill Union Free School District #2	1,588	Dutchess	Dutchess BOCES	Mid-Hudson RIC	Mid-Hudson
Spencer-Van Etten Central School District #1	762	Tioga	Schuyler-Steuben-Chemung-Tioga-Allegany (Greater Southern Tier) BOCES	Greater Southern Tier RIC	Mid-South
Spencerport Central School District #1	3,550	Monroe	Monroe 2 – Orleans BOCES	Monroe RIC	Mid-West
Springs Union Free School District #4	660	Suffolk	Eastern Suffolk (Suffolk-1) BOCES	Suffolk RIC	Long Island
Springville-Griffith Institute Central School District #1	1,560	Erie	Erie 2 Chautauqua-Cattaraugus BOCES	Erie RIC	West
Stamford Central School District #1	232	Delaware	Otsego-Delaware-Schoharie-Greene (Otsego Northern Catskills) BOCES	South Central RIC	Mid-South
Starpoint Central School District #1	2,900	Niagara	Orleans-Niagara BOCES	Erie RIC	West
Stillwater Central School District #1	1,000	Saratoga	Washington-Saratoga-Warren-Hamilton-Essex BOCES	Northeastern RIC	Capital District/North Country
Stockbridge Valley Central School District #1	389	Madison	Madison-Oneida BOCES	Mohawk RIC	Central Region
Suffern Central School District #1	3,834	Rockland	Rockland BOCES	Lower Hudson RIC	Lower Hudson Valley
Sullivan West Central School District #2	1,030	Sullivan	Sullivan BOCES	Mid-Hudson RIC	Mid-Hudson
Susquehanna Valley Central School District #1	1,472	Broome	Broome-Tioga BOCES	South Central RIC	Mid-South
Sweet Home Central School District #7	3,754	Erie	Erie 1 BOCES	Erie RIC	West
Syosset Central School District #2	7,165	Nassau	Nassau BOCES	Nassau RIC	Long Island
Syracuse City School District (not BOCES)	19,219	Onondaga	Onondaga-Cortland-Madison BOCES	Central RIC	Mid-State
Taconic Hills Central School District #1	965	Columbia	Rensselaer-Columbia-Greene (Questar III) BOCES	Northeastern RIC	Capital District/North Country
Thousand Islands Central School District #1	790	Jefferson	Jefferson-Lewis-Hamilton-Herkimer-Oneida BOCES	Mohawk RIC	Central Region
Three Village Central School District #1	5,485	Suffolk	Eastern Suffolk (Suffolk-1) BOCES	Suffolk RIC	Long Island
Ticonderoga Central School District #1	679	Essex	Clinton-Essex-Warren-Washington BOCES (Champlain Valley Educational Services)	Northeastern RIC	Capital District/North Country
Tioga Central School District #3	833	Tioga	Broome-Tioga BOCES	South Central RIC	Mid-South
Tonawanda City School District	1,696	Erie	Erie 1 BOCES	Erie RIC	West
Town of Webb Union Free School District #1	232	Herkimer	Jefferson-Lewis-Hamilton-Herkimer-Oneida BOCES	Mohawk RIC	Central Region
Tri-Valley Central School District #1	858	Sullivan	Sullivan BOCES	Mid-Hudson RIC	Mid-Hudson
Troy City School District	3,722	Rensselaer	Rensselaer-Columbia-Greene (Questar III) BOCES	Northeastern RIC	Capital District/North Country
Trumansburg Central School District #1	959	Tompkins	Tompkins-Seneca-Tioga BOCES	Central RIC	Mid-State
Tuckahoe Common School District #13	231	Suffolk	Eastern Suffolk (Suffolk-1) BOCES	Suffolk RIC	Long Island
Tuckahoe Union Free School District #2	1,087	Westchester	Westchester (Southern Westchester) BOCES	Lower Hudson RIC	Lower Hudson Valley
Tully Central School District #2	723	Onondaga	Onondaga-Cortland-Madison BOCES	Central RIC	Mid-State
Tupper Lake Central School District #1	699	Franklin	Franklin-Essex-Hamilton BOCES	Northeastern RIC	Capital District/North Country
Tuxedo Union Free School District #3	170	Orange	Orange-Ulster BOCES	Mid-Hudson RIC	Mid-Hudson
Unadilla Valley Central School District #3	794	Chenango	Delaware-Chenango-Madison-Otsego BOCES	South Central RIC	Mid-South
Union Free School District of the Tarrytowns #1	2,754	Westchester	Westchester (Southern Westchester) BOCES	Lower Hudson RIC	Lower Hudson Valley
Union Springs Central School District #1	685	Cayuga	Cayuga-Onondaga BOCES	Central RIC	Mid-State
Union-Endicott Central School District #1	3,589	Broome	Broome-Tioga BOCES	South Central RIC	Mid-South
Uniondale Union Free School District #2	5,735	Nassau	Nassau BOCES	Nassau RIC	Long Island
Utica City School District	9,504	Oneida	Oneida-Herkimer-Madison BOCES	Mohawk RIC	Central Region
Valhalla Union Free School District #5	1,479	Westchester	Westchester (Southern Westchester) BOCES	Lower Hudson RIC	Lower Hudson Valley
Valley Central School District (Montgomery) #1	4,234	Orange	Orange-Ulster BOCES	Mid-Hudson RIC	Mid-Hudson
Valley Stream 13 Union Free School District	2,061	Nassau	Nassau BOCES	Nassau RIC	Long Island
Valley Stream 24 Union Free School District	1,040	Nassau	Nassau BOCES	Nassau RIC	Long Island
Valley Stream 30 Union Free School District	1,436	Nassau	Nassau BOCES	Nassau RIC	Long Island
Valley Stream Central High School District #1	4,454	Nassau	Nassau BOCES	Nassau RIC	Long Island
Van Hornesville-Owen D. Young Central School District #1	146	Herkimer	Herkimer-Fulton-Hamilton-Otsego BOCES	Mohawk RIC	Central Region
Vestal Central School District #1	3,607	Broome	Broome-Tioga BOCES	South Central RIC	Mid-South
Victor Central School District #1	4,211	Ontario	Ontario-Seneca-Yates-Cayuga-Wayne (Wayne-Finger Lakes) BOCES	Wayne-Finger Lakes RIC	Mid-West
Voorheesville Central School District #3	1,191	Albany	Albany-Schoharie-Schenectady-Saratoga (Capital Region) BOCES	Northeastern RIC	Capital District/North Country
Wainscott Common School District #2	17	Suffolk	Eastern Suffolk (Suffolk-1) BOCES	Suffolk RIC	Long Island
Wallkill Central School District #1	2,747	Ulster	Ulster BOCES	Mid-Hudson RIC	Mid-Hudson
Walton Central School District #1	798	Delaware	Delaware-Chenango-Madison-Otsego BOCES	South Central RIC	Mid-South
Wantagh Union Free School District #23	2,819	Nassau	Nassau BOCES	Nassau RIC	Long Island
Wappingers Central School District #1	10,234	Dutchess	Dutchess BOCES	Mid-Hudson RIC	Mid-Hudson
Warrensburg Central School District #1	600	Warren	Washington-Saratoga-Warren-Hamilton-Essex BOCES	Northeastern RIC	Capital District/North Country
Warsaw Central School District #1	742	Wyoming	Genesee Valley BOCES (Genesee-Livingston-Steuben-Wyoming)	Wayne-Finger Lakes RIC	Mid-West
Warwick Valley Central School District #1	3,743	Orange	Orange-Ulster BOCES	Mid-Hudson RIC	Mid-Hudson
Washingtonville Central School District #2	3,966	Orange	Orange-Ulster BOCES	Mid-Hudson RIC	Mid-Hudson
Waterford-Halfmoon Union Free School District #1	707	Saratoga	Washington-Saratoga-Warren-Hamilton-Essex BOCES	Northeastern RIC	Capital District/North Country
Waterloo Central School District #6	1,346	Seneca	Ontario-Seneca-Yates-Cayuga-Wayne (Wayne-Finger Lakes) BOCES	Wayne-Finger Lakes RIC	Mid-West
Watertown City School District	4,194	Jefferson	Jefferson-Lewis-Hamilton-Herkimer-Oneida BOCES	Mohawk RIC	Central Region
Waterville Central School District #2	727	Oneida	Oneida-Herkimer-Madison BOCES	Mohawk RIC	Central Region
Watervliet City School District	1,529	Albany	Albany-Schoharie-Schenectady-Saratoga (Capital Region) BOCES	Northeastern RIC	Capital District/North Country
Watkins Glen Central School District #1	909	Schuyler	Schuyler-Steuben-Chemung-Tioga-Allegany (Greater Southern Tier) BOCES	Greater Southern Tier RIC	Mid-South
Waverly Central School District #1	1,649	Tioga	Schuyler-Steuben-Chemung-Tioga-Allegany (Greater Southern Tier) BOCES	Greater Southern Tier RIC	Mid-South
Wayland-Cohocton Central School District #2	1,300	Steuben	Genesee Valley BOCES (Genesee-Livingston-Steuben-Wyoming)	Wayne-Finger Lakes RIC	Mid-West
Wayne Central School District #1	2,078	Wayne	Ontario-Seneca-Yates-Cayuga-Wayne (Wayne-Finger Lakes) BOCES	Wayne-Finger Lakes RIC	Mid-West
Webster Central School District #1	7,994	Monroe	Monroe 1 BOCES	Monroe RIC	Mid-West
Weedsport Central School District #1	685	Cayuga	Cayuga-Onondaga BOCES	Central RIC	Mid-State
Wells Central School District #1	134	Hamilton	Hamilton-Fulton-Montgomery BOCES	Northeastern RIC	Capital District/North Country
Wellsville Central School District #1	1,159	Allegany	Cattaraugus-Allegany-Erie-Wyoming BOCES	Erie RIC	West
West Babylon Union Free School District #2	3,537	Suffolk	Western Suffolk (Suffolk-3) BOCES	Suffolk RIC	Long Island
West Canada Valley Central School District #2	673	Herkimer	Herkimer-Fulton-Hamilton-Otsego BOCES	Mohawk RIC	Central Region
West Genesee Central School District #1	4,655	Onondaga	Onondaga-Cortland-Madison BOCES	Central RIC	Mid-State
West Hempstead Union Free School District #27	1,644	Nassau	Nassau BOCES	Nassau RIC	Long Island
West Irondequoit Central School District #3	3,566	Monroe	Monroe 1 BOCES	Monroe RIC	Mid-West
West Islip Union Free School District #9	3,947	Suffolk	Eastern Suffolk (Suffolk-1) BOCES	Suffolk RIC	Long Island
West Park Union Free School District #2	0	Ulster	Ulster BOCES	Mid-Hudson RIC	Mid-Hudson
West Seneca Central School District #1	5,992	Erie	Erie 1 BOCES	Erie RIC	West
West Valley Central School District #4	179	Cattaraugus	Cattaraugus-Allegany-Erie-Wyoming BOCES	Erie RIC	West
Westbury Union Free School District #1	4,235	Nassau	Nassau BOCES	Nassau RIC	Long Island
Westfield Central School District #1	580	Chautauqua	Erie 2 Chautauqua-Cattaraugus BOCES	Erie RIC	West
Westhampton Beach Union Free School District #2	1,611	Suffolk	Eastern Suffolk (Suffolk-1) BOCES	Suffolk RIC	Long Island
Westhill Central School District #1	1,744	Onondaga	Onondaga-Cortland-Madison BOCES	Central RIC	Mid-State
Westmoreland Central School District #1	798	Oneida	Oneida-Herkimer-Madison BOCES	Mohawk RIC	Central Region
Wheatland-Chili Central School District #1	655	Monroe	Monroe 2 – Orleans BOCES	Monroe RIC	Mid-West
Wheelerville Union Free School District #1	123	Fulton	Hamilton-Fulton-Montgomery BOCES	Northeastern RIC	Capital District/North Country
White Plains City School District	6,966	Westchester	Westchester (Southern Westchester) BOCES	Lower Hudson RIC	Lower Hudson Valley
Whitehall Central School District #1	627	Washington	Washington-Saratoga-Warren-Hamilton-Essex BOCES	Northeastern RIC	Capital District/North Country
Whitesboro Central School District #2	2,905	Oneida	Oneida-Herkimer-Madison BOCES	Mohawk RIC	Central Region
Whitesville Central School District #1	56	Allegany	Cattaraugus-Allegany-Erie-Wyoming BOCES	Erie RIC	West
Whitney Point Central School District #1	1,387	Broome	Broome-Tioga BOCES	South Central RIC	Mid-South
William Floyd Union Free School District #32	9,641	Suffolk	Eastern Suffolk (Suffolk-1) BOCES	Suffolk RIC	Long Island
Williamson Central School District #2	936	Wayne	Ontario-Seneca-Yates-Cayuga-Wayne (Wayne-Finger Lakes) BOCES	Wayne-Finger Lakes RIC	Mid-West
Williamsville Central School District #3	9,916	Erie	Erie 1 BOCES	Erie RIC	West
Willsboro Central School District #1	253	Essex	Clinton-Essex-Warren-Washington BOCES (Champlain Valley Educational Services)	Northeastern RIC	Capital District/North Country
Wilson Central School District #1	975	Niagara	Orleans-Niagara BOCES	Erie RIC	West
Windham-Ashland-Jewett Central School District #1	280	Greene	Otsego-Delaware-Schoharie-Greene (Otsego Northern Catskills) BOCES	South Central RIC	Mid-South
Windsor Central School District #1	1,523	Broome	Broome-Tioga BOCES	South Central RIC	Mid-South
Worcester Central School District #6	309	Otsego	Otsego-Delaware-Schoharie-Greene (Otsego Northern Catskills) BOCES	South Central RIC	Mid-South
Wyandanch Union Free School District #9	2,378	Suffolk	Western Suffolk (Suffolk-3) BOCES	Suffolk RIC	Long Island
Wynantskill Union Free School District #4	304	Rensselaer	Rensselaer-Columbia-Greene (Questar III) BOCES	Northeastern RIC	Capital District/North Country
Wyoming Central School District #2	140	Wyoming	Genesee Valley BOCES (Genesee-Livingston-Steuben-Wyoming)	Wayne-Finger Lakes RIC	Mid-West
Yonkers City School District (not BOCES)	23,373	Westchester	Westchester (Southern Westchester) BOCES	Lower Hudson RIC	Lower Hudson Valley
York Central School District #1	623	Livingston	Genesee Valley BOCES (Genesee-Livingston-Steuben-Wyoming)	Wayne-Finger Lakes RIC	Mid-West
Yorkshire-Pioneer Central School District #1	2,111	Cattaraugus	Cattaraugus-Allegany-Erie-Wyoming BOCES	Erie RIC	West
Yorktown Central School District #2	3,588	Westchester	Putnam-Westchester (Putnam-Northern Westchester) BOCES	Lower Hudson RIC	Lower Hudson Valley

== See also ==
- Boards of Cooperative Educational Services
- List of high schools in New York (state)
- List of Long Island public school districts and schools
- New York City DOE District 22, abolished in 2002

== Sources ==
The list of school districts in each BOCES area is taken from the individual BOCES website.

- New York State Education Department
- Public School District Codes
- School District Index for The NYS Administrators Listing
- List of New York School Districts websites
- School Districts in New York State
