= Dan MacNeill =

American football coach (born c. 1957)

Biographical details
- Born: c. 1957 (age 68–69); Walton, New York, U.S.
- Education: State University of New York College at Cortland (1979)

Playing career

Football
- 1975–1978: Cortland
- Positions: Linebacker, defensive tackle

Coaching career (HC unless noted)

Football
- 1980–1981: Port Byron Central HS (NY) (assistant)
- 1982: Ithaca (GA)
- 1983: Ithaca (WR)
- 1984–1987: Villanova (DE)
- 1988–1996: Villanova (DC/LB)
- 1997–2019: Cortland

Track and field
- 1980–1981: Port Byron Central HS (NY)

Head coaching record
- Overall: 155–84 (college football) (Note: Cortland was forced to vacate all seven wins from the 2009 season)
- Tournaments: 5–6 (NCAA D-III playoffs)

Accomplishments and honors

Championships
- 6 NJAC (2005–2008, 2010, 2012); 2 E8 (2015, 2019)

Awards
- 2× NJAC Coach of the Year (2008, 2012)

Dan MacNeill (born c. 1957) is an American former college football coach. He was the head football coach for State University of New York College at Cortland—now known as State University of New York at Cortland—from 1997 to 2019. He also coached for Port Byron Central High School, Ithaca, and Villanova. He played college football for Cortland as a linebacker and defensive tackle.

== Head coaching record ==
=== College football ===
Year	Team	Overall	Conference	Standing	Bowl/playoffs	D3^{#}
Cortland Red Dragons (NCAA Division III independent) (1997–1999)
1997	Cortland	8–2			L NCAA Division III Regional	
1998	Cortland	4–6				
1999	Cortland	5–5				
Cortland Red Dragons (New Jersey Athletic Conference) (2000–2014)
2000	Cortland	4–6	4–2	3rd		
2001	Cortland	5–5	3–3	4th		
2002	Cortland	9–2	4–2	T–2nd		
2003	Cortland	5–5	2–3	4th		
2004	Cortland	5–4	4–2	3rd		
2005	Cortland	7–3	5–1	T–1st	L NCAA Division III First Round	
2006	Cortland	9–2	6–1	T–1st		21
2007	Cortland	8–3	6–1	T–1st		
2008	Cortland	11–2	9–0	1st	L NCAA Division III Quarterfinal	6
2009	Cortland	0–4	0–2	N/A		
2010	Cortland	10–2	8–1	T–1st	L NCAA Division III Second Round	18
2011	Cortland	9–2	7–2	T–2nd		
2012	Cortland	9–2	7–0	1st	L NCAA Division III Second Round	24
2013	Cortland	6–5	5–2	3rd		
2014	Cortland	5–5	4–3	4th		
Cortland Red Dragons (Empire 8 Athletic Conference) (2015–2019)
2015	Cortland	9–3	6–2	T–1st	L NCAA Division III Second Round	15
2016	Cortland	5–6	3–5	T–6th		
2017	Cortland	7–4	5–2	T–2nd		
2018	Cortland	7–3	5–2	2nd		
2019	Cortland	8–3	5–1	T–1st		
Cortland:		155–84	98–37			
Total:		155–84				
National championship Conference title Conference division title or championship game berth
