= Batavia School District =

Batavia School District may refer to:

- Batavia Public School District 101 - Illinois
- Batavia City School District - New York
