= Byron–Bergen Central School District =

School district in the U.S. state of New York

Byron-Bergen Central School District

Location
- Bergen, New York Genesee County, New York United States

District information
- Motto: Challenge, Engage, and Nurture
- Grades: PreK-12
- Superintendent: Patrick McGee
- Schools: 2

Students and staff
- Athletic conference: Section V
- District mascot: Bees
- Colors: Maroon and Gray

Other information
- Website: http://www.bbschools.org

Byron–Bergen Central School District is a school district in Bergen, New York. Mr. Patrick McGee is the superintendent. The district operates two schools: Byron-Bergen Junior-Senior High School and Byron-Bergen Elementary School.

== History ==
Founded in 1955, it is the combination of two school districts in Byron and Bergen, small towns in western New York State. The District encompasses 77 square miles in a rural, agricultural area.

=== Selected former superintendents ===
Previous assignment and reason for departure denoted within parentheses

- George A. Barber
- William A. Stirling
- John Hadden [interim]–1968-1969
- Thomas Colamoncio–1969-1970
- William Hayes–1970-?
- J. Dennis Kirst–1995-2001
- Gregory C. Geer–2001–2009 (Principal - East Irondequoit Middle School, retired)
- Scott G. Martzloff–2009–2011 (Assistant Principal for Operations - Edison Technology High School, named Superintendent of Williamsville Central School District)
- Loren Penman (interim)–2011-2012 (Director of Learning - Byron–Bergen Central School District, retired)
- Casey Kosiorek–2012-2016 (Principal - Wolcott Street Elementary School, named Superintendent of Hilton Central School District)
- Jon Hunter (interim)–2016 (Superintendent - Fairport Central School District, named Interim Superintendent of West Irondequoit Central School District)
- Mickey Edwards–2016-2021 (Superintendent - Wyoming Central School, named Superintendent of Albion Central School District)
- Scott Bischoping (interim)–2021 (Interim Superintendent - Albion Central School District, named Interim Superintendent of Batavia City School District)

== Byron-Bergen Junior-Senior High School ==
Byron-Bergen Junior-Senior High School

Information
- Principal: Carol Stehm (Interim)
- Grades: 6-12
- Website: Byron-Bergen Jr./Sr. High School

Byron-Bergen Junior-Senior High School is located at 6917 West Bergen Road and serves grades 6 through 12. The current principal is Carol Stehm (Interim).

=== History ===
Byron-Bergen operated a middle school from 2003 to 2012, when it reconsolidated with the high school for budget reasons.

==== Selected Former Principals ====
Previous assignment and reason for departure denoted within parentheses

- LeRoy G. Merriam
- Norman J. Hill
- John F. Hadden–?-1968 (unknown, named Acting District Principal of Byron–Bergen Central School District)
- Udo Treiber–1968-1969 (Principal - Byron-Bergen Elementary School, returned to position)
- William Hayes–1969-1978 (unknown, named Superintendent of Byron–Bergen Central School District)
- Frank C. Ferrando–1978-1988 (Assistant Principal - Batavia High School, named Assistant Superintendent for Secondary Education of Grand Island Central School District)
- Edward F. Bishop–1988-2000 (Vice Principal - Waterloo High School, retired)
- Norman Fagnan–2000–2001
- Donna Schalge–2001–2003
- Frank Del Favero–2003-2004
- David R. Pescrillo–2004–2009 (Assistant Principal/Athletic Director - East Irondequoit High School, retired)
- Aaron Johnson–2009-2015 (Assistant Principal - Gates Chili High School, named Superintendent of Avon Central School District)
- Patrick McGee–2015-2021 (Assistant Principal - Byron-Bergen Junior-Senior High School, named Superintendent of Byron–Bergen Central School District)

== Byron-Bergen Elementary School ==
Byron-Bergen Elementary School

Information
- Principal: Kristin Loftus
- Grades: Pre-K-5
- Website: Byron-Bergen Elementary School

Byron-Bergen Elementary School is located at 6917 West Bergen Road and serves grades PreK through 5. The current principal is Kristin Loftus.
