= Owego Free Academy =

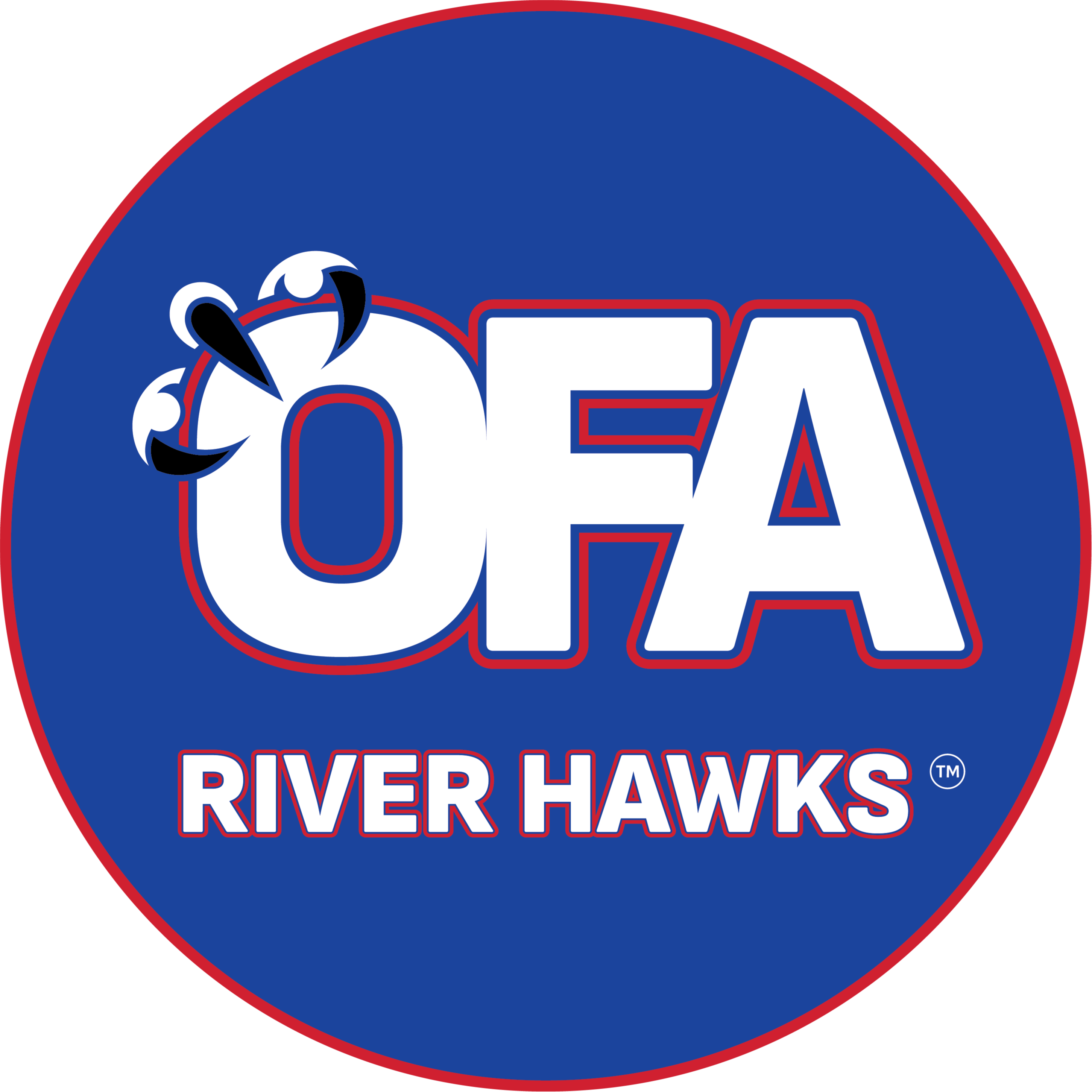

Location
- 1 Sheldon Guile Boulevard; Owego, New York 13827; United States
- Coordinates: 42°07′01″N 76°16′22″W

Information
- Type: Public
- Motto: Community, Pride, Tradition
- Established: 1828 (198 years ago)
- School district: Owego Apalachin Central School District
- Principal: Phil Schofield
- Teaching staff: 51.96 (on an FTE basis)
- Grades: 9–12
- Enrollment: 606 (2022–23)
- Student to teacher ratio: 11.66
- Campus type: Suburban
- Colors: Red and Blue
- Athletics conference: Southern Tier Athletic Conference
- Nickname: River Hawks
- Yearbook: Tom-Tom
- Website: www.oacsd.org/o/ofa

Owego Free Academy is a public high school located in Owego, New York. The school serves students in ninth through twelfth grades and is part of the Owego Apalachin Central School District.

== History ==
Owego Free Academy traces its founding to 1827, when the Owego Academy was built on a tract of land donated for that purpose by James McMaster, who was the first white settler of Owego. The original school building, which is located on Court Street, consisted of three stories and featured a steeple that housed a bell. In 1851, the academy's capacity was increased with the construction of a three-story addition in the rear of the building; however, within several years, the building's interior was gutted and the third story was removed. When the academy opened to students in April 1828, the academic year was divided into two terms consisting of two twelve-week quarters. Tuition ranged from two dollars to four dollars per quarter depending on the course of study.

In 1864, the Owego Academy was merged into the union free schools of Owego by an act of the New York Legislature, and the school was accordingly renamed Owego Free Academy.

By the 1880s, the original Academy building on Court Street was no longer suitable for the school's needs. A new building was constructed on the corner of Main and Academy Streets in 1883 at a cost of $25,000. The 1883 building was later demolished, and a larger building was constructed on the same site in the 1920s. As of 2024, this building is still in use as the Tioga County Office Building.

A new, single-story building was constructed on the north side of the village in 1958. This building later housed Owego-Apalachin Middle School from 1972 until 2005. The current Owego Free Academy was opened in 1972 and is located near the north side of the village limits. It is situated on a large campus that includes several athletic fields, as well as Owego Elementary School, Owego-Apalachin Middle School, and the Owego-Apalachin Central School District main offices. In 2005, Owego-Apalachin Middle School was opened; this building is connected to Owego Free Academy, and the schools share a music wing and a large theater.

== Education ==
Students at Owego Free Academy can earn a local diploma, as well as a Regents diploma or Regents diploma with advanced designation by passing a requisite number of Regents examinations. College credits can be earned several ways, including successful completion of Advanced Placement courses, as well as courses offered in conjunction with Tompkins Cortland Community College (TC3). Students who successfully complete a requisite number of dual-credit courses offered through TC3 can graduate from Owego Free Academy with an associate degree.

Owego Free Academy has received national recognition for its music department, and is a six-time recipient of the Best Communities for Music Education designation from the National Association of Music Merchants.

== Athletics ==
Owego Free Academy's athletics teams compete in Section IV of the New York State Public High School Athletic Association, and the school is also a member of the Southern Tier Athletic Conference.

For much of the school's history, its athletics teams were known as the Indians. In 2023, the New York State Board of Regents issued an order mandating the retirement of Native American mascots for all New York public schools by 2025. Owego Free Academy's mascot was accordingly changed to the River Hawk in September 2023.

As of 2024, Owego Free Academy teams have won NYSPHSAA championships in the following sports:

- Boys' Baseball – 1997
- Boys' Soccer – 2002
- Girls' Volleyball – 2013, 2015, 2017

== Notable alumni ==
- Washington Gladden (1854), Congregational pastor
- Doug Hurley (1984), NASA astronaut
- Thomas C. Platt (1854), United States Senator
- Raphael Pumpelly (1855), geologist
- John D. Rockefeller (attended 1851–53), founder of Standard Oil Company
- Benjamin F. Tracy (1848), United States Secretary of the Navy

== Bibliography ==
- Kingman, LeRoy (1907). Owego: Some account of the early settlement of the village in Tioga County, N.Y., called Ah-wa-ga by the Indians, which name was corrupted by gradual evolution into Owago, Owego, Owegy, and finally Owego. Owego: Owego Gazette Office.
