= Norwich High School =

Location
- 49 Midland Dr; Norwich, New York 13815; United States
- Coordinates: 42.527852°N 75.514648°W

Information
- Type: Public
- School district: Norwich City School District
- NCES School ID: 362133003039
- Principal: Jacob Roe (Current)
- Teaching staff: 45.98 (on an FTE basis)
- Grades: 9-12
- Enrollment: 516 (2023-2024)
- Student to teacher ratio: 11.22
- Campus: Rural: Distant
- Colors: Purple and White
- Athletics conference: Southern Tier Athletic Conference
- Mascot: Purple Tornadoes
- Yearbook: Archive
- Website: www.norwichcsd.org/page/norwich-high-school

Norwich High School (NHS) is a public high school located in Norwich, New York, United States. It is the only high school operated by the Norwich City School District. The school is located on Midland Drive, and is connected to the adjacent Norwich Middle School. NHS is known as the "Home of the Purple Tornado", the mascot symbol and pride of the Norwich City School District athletic teams, donning the spirit colors of purple and white. The current principal is Jacob Roe.

The NHS/NMS buildings have recently undergone renovations, as well as Ulrich Field, the school's athletic field. Another new renovation at NHS is a new parking lot. The new parking lot adds more parking space near the track and football field.

Norwich High School houses grades 9-12 with approximately 768 (2023-2024) students. Class sizes averages between 23-29 students. The high school offers a variety of courses which include Honors, Advanced Placement (English, Art, Social Studies, Science, Foreign Language) College level through Morrisville (Science and Math) and a variety of electives.

== Notable faculty ==
- John Barsha (born Abraham Barshofsky; 1898–1976), professional football player
- Gary Shapley, government official
