= Don Bosseler =

American football player (1936–2024)

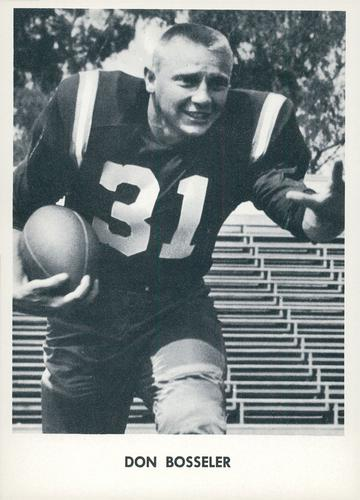
- Bosseler with the Washington Redskins in 1958

No. 31
- Position: Fullback

Personal information
- Born: January 24, 1936; Wethersfield, New York, U.S.
- Died: November 6, 2024 (aged 88); Atlanta, Georgia, U.S.
- Listed height: 6 ft 1 in (1.85 m)
- Listed weight: 212 lb (96 kg)

Career information
- High school: Batavia (Batavia, New York)
- College: Miami (FL)
- NFL draft: 1957: 1st round, 9th overall pick

Career history
- Washington Redskins (1957–1964)

Awards and highlights
- Pro Bowl (1959); 80 Greatest Redskins; First-team All-American (1956)

Career NFL statistics
- Rushing yards: 3,112
- Rushing average: 4
- Rushing touchdowns: 22
- Stats at Pro Football Reference
- College Football Hall of Fame

Donald John "The Bull" Bosseler (January 24, 1936 – November 6, 2024) was an American professional football player as a fullback in the National Football League (NFL) for the Washington Redskins from 1957 to 1964. He played college football for the Miami Hurricanes and was selected in the first round of the 1957 NFL draft with the ninth overall pick.

In 1970, Bosseler was inducted into the University of Miami Sports Hall of Fame then the College Football Hall of Fame twenty years later. He was named one of the 80 greatest players in Redskins history in 2012, when the franchise celebrated its 80th anniversary.

== Early life ==
Bosseler attended and played high school football at Batavia High School in Batavia, New York.

== College career ==
Bosseler was a four-year starter at fullback for the University of Miami. In 1956, the senior was a core player for the Hurricanes team that compiled an 8–1–1 record and ranked No. 6 in the final Associated Press poll. He was named All-America by the Associated Press and MVP in the Senior Bowl that season, which saw him gain 723 yards and four touchdowns on the ground.

Overall, Bosseler rushed for 1,642 yards on the ground, the second most in Hurricanes history at the time. The total still ranks 21st on their all-time list.

== Professional career ==
Bosseler was drafted ninth overall in the 1957 NFL draft and played for seven seasons with the Washington Redskins before retirement.

Known as The Bull for his brutish, straight-ahead style that belied his average size for the fullback position, Bossier was the top ground-gainer for the Redskins in three of his first four seasons. In 1957, the rookie amassed 825 yards from scrimmage and seven touchdowns in what would be the best campaign of his career.

Two years later, Bosseler rushed for a career-high 163 yards and two touchdowns in a 30-23 loss against the Eagles in Philadelphia. He concluded the season with 624 yards and three touchdowns on the ground, a performance that earned him a spot on the East squad in the Pro Bowl game.

Bosseler remained a starter in his final five seasons, the most productive of which came in 1962, when he rushed for 336 yards and caught a career-high 32 passes for 258 more.

== NFL career statistics ==
Legend
**Bold**	Career high

Year	Team	Games		Rushing					Receiving				
Year	Team	GP	GS	Att	Yds	Avg	Lng	TD	Rec	Yds	Avg	Lng	TD
1957	WAS	12	10	**167**	**673**	4.0	28	**7**	19	152	8.0	25	0
1958	WAS	10	4	109	475	4.4	23	4	14	101	7.2	28	0
1959	WAS	12	9	119	644	**5.4**	**41**	3	11	47	4.3	10	0
1960	WAS	11	11	109	428	3.9	29	2	13	86	6.6	50	0
1961	WAS	12	11	77	220	2.9	16	2	16	94	5.9	18	**1**
1962	WAS	14	14	93	336	3.6	15	2	**32**	258	8.1	35	0
1963	WAS	14	14	79	290	3.7	18	2	25	**289**	**11.6**	**61**	0
1964	WAS	11	3	22	46	2.1	9	0	6	56	9.3	18	0
		96	76	775	3,112	4.0	41	22	136	1,083	8.0	61	1

== Post-football career ==
After his days as a player, Bosseler briefly served as a radio analyst for Miami Dolphins radio broadcasts. He moved on to Prudential Bache in Miami in the role of vice president.

Bosseler died in Atlanta on November 6, 2024, at age 88.
