= New York City DOE District 22 =

Former school district

Coordinates: 40.615°N 73.941°W

New York City DOE District 22 was a district in New York City encompassing New York City Public Schools in Brooklyn. However, districts were abolished in 2002 when the school system was reorganized.

== Elementary ==
School name	Grades
P.S. 052 Sheepshead Bay (K052)	PK,0K,01,02,03,04,05,SE
P.S. 119 Amersfort (K119)	02,03,04,05,SE
P.S. 139 Alexine A. Fenty (K139)	PK,0K,01,02,03,04,05,SE
P.S. 193 Gil Hodges (K193)	PK,0K,01,02,03,04,05,SE
P.S. 194 Raoul Wallenberg (K194)	PK,0K,01,02,03,04,05,SE
P.S. 195 Manhattan Beach (K195)	PK,0K,01,02,03,04,05,SE
P.S. 197 Brooklyn (K197)	PK,0K,01,02,03,04,05,SE
P.S. 198 Brooklyn (K198)	PK,0K,01,02,03,04,05,SE
P.S. 203 Floyd Bennett (K203)	PK,0K,01,02,03,04,05,SE
P.S. 217 Colonel David Marcus School (K217)	PK,0K,01,02,03,04,05,SE
P.S. 222 Katherine R. Snyder (K222)	PK,0K,01,02,03,04,05,SE
P.S. 236 Mill Basin (K236)	PK,0K,01,02,03,04,05,SE
P.S. 245 (K245)	PK,0K,01,02,03,04,05,SE
P.S. 251 Paedergat (K251)	PK,0K,01,02,03,04,05,SE
P.S. 254 Dag Hammarskjold (K254)	PK,0K,01,02,03,04,05,SE
P.S. 255 Barbara Reing School (K255)	PK,0K,01,02,03,04,05,SE
P.S. 277 Gerritsen Beach (K277)	PK,0K,01,02,03,04,05,SE
P.S. 312 Bergen Beach (K312)	PK,0K,01,02,03,04,05,SE
P.S. 269 Nostrand (K269)	PK,03,04,05,SE
P.S. 326 (K326)	PK,0K,01,SE
P.S. 361 (K361)	PK,0K,01,02,SE
P.S. K134 (K134)	PK,0K,01,02,03,04,05,SE
P.S. K315 (K315)	PK,0K,01,02,03,04,05,SE
School of Science & Technology (K152)	PK,0K,01,02,03,04,05,SE
P.S. 889 (K889)	PK,0K,01,02,03,04,05,SE

- P.S. 109 (K109) Grades: 0K,01,02,03,04,05,06,07,08,SE
- P.S. 206 Joseph F Lamb (K206) Grades: PK,0K,01,02,03,04,05,06,07,08,SE
- P.S. 207 Elizabeth G. Leary (K207) Grades: PK,0K,01,02,03,04,05,06,07,SE

== High schools ==
- Midwood High School
- James Madison High School
- Sheepshead Bay High School
- Leon M. Goldstein High School for the Sciences
- Brooklyn College Academy
- South Shore High School (scheduled to close in 2010)
