= Sidney Central School District =

School district in New York, United States

Location
- Sidney, New York United States

District information
- Motto: Challenging Students To Achieve Their Greatest Potential
- Grades: PreK-12
- Superintendent: Eben Bullock
- Schools: 2

Students and staff
- District mascot: Sabers

Other information
- Website: www.sidneycsd.org

Sidney Central School District is a school district in Sidney, New York, United States. The district operates two schools: Sidney Jr. Sr. High School, and Sidney Elementary School.

== Administration ==
The district offices are located at 95 West Main Street.

== Sidney Jr. Sr. High School ==
Sidney Jr. Sr. High School

Information
- Principal: Eben Bullock
- Grades: 7-12
- Website: Sidney Jr. Sr. High School

Sidney Jr. Sr. High School is located at 95 West Main Street and serves grades 7 through 12. The current principal is Mr. Eben Bullock.

=== History ===
==== Selected former principals ====
- Mr. Timothy J. Turecek–?-2004
- Ms. Annette Hammond–2004-2010

== Sidney Elementary School ==
Sidney Elementary School

Information
- Principal: Corey Green
- Grades: K-6
- Website: Sidney Elementary School

Sidney Elementary School is located at 15 Pearl Street East and serves grades K through 6. The current principal is Mr. Corey Green.

=== History ===
==== Selected former principals ====
- Mr. Stephen C. Paranya
- Mr. Peter Stewart–?-2006
