= Owego Apalachin Central School District =

School district in the U.S. state of New York

Address
- Owego, NY 13827 United States Owego elementary school 2 Sheldon Guile Blvd Owego, NY 13827 United States District office 3 Sheldon Guile Blvd Owego, NY 13827 United States Apalachin elementary school 405 Pennsylvania Ave Apalachin, NY 13732 United States Middle/High schools 1 Sheldon Guile Blvd Owego, New York, 13827; United States

District information
- Type: Public
- Grades: PreK–12
- NCES District ID: 3622170

Students and staff
- Students: 1,934 (2020–2021)
- Teachers: 152.8 (on an FTE basis)
- Staff: 145.1 (on an FTE basis)
- Student–teacher ratio: 12.66:1

Other information
- Website: www.oacsd.org

Owego Apalachin Central School District is a school district in Owego, New York.

== List of schools ==
- High School (Grades 9–12):
  - Owego Free Academy
- Middle School (Grades 6–8):
  - Owego Apalachin Middle School
- Elementary Schools (Grades K-5):
  - Apalachin Elementary School
  - Owego Elementary School

== See also ==
- List of school districts in New York
