= Clyde–Savannah Central School District =

School district in New York, United States

Clyde-Savannah Central School District

Location
- Clyde, New York US-NY United States

District information
- Type: Public (government funded)
- Grades: Pre-K through 12
- Established: 1966
- Superintendent: Michael Hayden
- Schools: 3
- NCES District ID: 3607860

Students and staff
- Students: 870
- Teachers: 73.35
- Student–teacher ratio: 11.86:1
- District mascot: Golden Eagles
- Colors: Purple and Gold

Other information
- Website: Clyde-Savannah Central School District

Clyde–Savannah Central School District is a public school district in New York State, USA that serves approximately 870 students in the villages of Clyde and Savannah in Wayne County.

The average class size is 17 students (all grades).

Michael C. Hayden is the Superintendent of Schools.

== Former superintendents ==
- George Batterson–?-2001
- Paul R. Doyle–2001–2004
- Richard A. Drahms–2004–2006
- Marilyn Barr–2006–2009
- Theresa Pulos 2009-2014

== Performance ==
The District's 82% graduation rate exceeds the State Standard of 55%.

== Clyde-Savannah High School ==
Clyde-Savannah High School
- 215 Glasgow Street; Clyde, NY 14433

Information
- School code: 331405
- NCES School ID: 360786000559
- Principal: Craig Pawlak
- Teaching staff: 21.61
- Grades: 9-12
- Student to teacher ratio: 12.63:1
- Hours in school day: 7
- Athletics conference: NYSPHSAA
- Team name: Golden Eagles
- Website: Clyde-Savannah High School

Clyde-Savannah High School, formerly Clyde-Savannah Junior/Senior High School, is located at 215 Glasgow Street and serves grades 9 through 12. The current principal is Dr. Craig Pawlak.

=== History ===
Until fall 2011, the high school served grades 7 through 12. After the closure of the middle school building, the middle school moved to the high school building and the 7th and 8th grades were then considered to be part of the middle school.

In 2024, three varsity football players from the high school pled guilty in Wayne County Court to hazing and forcible touching of a 14-year-old teammate inside the high school locker room. They were each sentenced to two years probation for the hazing charge and a one-year conditional discharge for forcible touching.

==== Selected former principals ====
- Thomas J. Castellano–1981-1989 (Social Studies teacher - Clyde-Savannah High School, retired)
- Anthony J. Patanzo–?-2005
- Matthew Motala–2005–2006

=== Aerial View ===
- Aerial map

== Clyde-Savannah Middle School ==
Clyde-Savannah Middle School
- 215 Glasgow Street; Clyde, NY 14433

Information
- NCES School ID: 360786006290
- Principal: Justin Fries
- Teaching staff: 12.91
- Grades: 6-8
- Student to teacher ratio: 14.25:1
- Hours in school day: 7
- Website: Clyde-Savannah Middle School

Clyde-Savannah Middle School is located in the same building as the high school.

=== History ===
The Middle School, formerly known as Savannah Elementary School, originally served grades 5 and 6 and was located on School Street in Savannah, New York. The Middle School building closed in 2011, moving 5th graders to the Clyde elementary building and 6th graders to the high school building. The middle school was then redefined to consist of grades 6 through 8, and to exist within the same building as the high school. The current principal is Justin Fries.

==== Former principals ====
Reason for departure denoted in parentheses

- Lynne Baker-Osserman–?-2004 (named Director of Special Education - Waterloo Central School District)
- Belinda Crowe–2005-2014 (named Assistant Superintendent of Curriculum and Instruction)

== Clyde-Savannah Elementary School ==
Clyde Elementary
- 212 East DeZeng Street; Clyde, NY 14433

Information
- Type: Public, Coeducational
- NCES School ID: 360786000558
- Principal: Jennifer Kelsey
- Teaching staff: 32.01
- Grades: Pre-K-5
- Student to teacher ratio: 12.9:1
- Hours in school day: 6.5
- Website: Clyde-Savannah Elementary School

Clyde-Savannah Elementary School, formerly Clyde Elementary School, is located at 212 East DeZeng Street and serves grades Pre-K through 5. The current principal is Kathryn Lumb.

=== History ===
The elementary school originally served kindergarten through 4th grade. After the closure of the middle school building, 5th grade was moved to the Clyde elementary building.

==== Selected former principals ====
- James Sebring–?-2000
- William Schmidt–2000–2009
- Tom Castellano– 2009-2014

== Other information ==
In April 2008, the district won a Safety Excellence award from the school system's prime insurer, Utica National Insurance Group. Of 340 schools, 54 of them –including Clyde-Savannah– received Titanium Plus status and a $500 award. To earn the award, the district documented 124 safety-related items. Dean of Students Larry Hartwell says, "We've practiced just about everything in the emergency handbook...." The state-mandated Emergency Management Plan includes detailed procedures for bomb threats, chemical spills on the railway in Clyde and severe weather. Clyde-Savannah schools have been set up with the Red Cross to act as emergency centers. If the schools must be evacuated, the district would set up a command post in the bus garage, sending all phone lines through there. If a chemical spill were to occur, the schools can immediately close all air-circulation systems that draw in outside air.
