= Batavia High School (New York) =

Location
- 260 State St; Batavia, New York 14020; United States
- 43°00′45″N 78°10′46″W

Information
- Type: Public
- School district: Batavia City School District
- NCES School ID: 360399000156
- Principal: Jennifer Wesp
- Teaching staff: 55 (on an FTE basis)
- Grades: 9-12
- Enrollment: 646 (2024-2025)
- Student to teacher ratio: 11.75
- Colors: Royal Blue and White
- Song: Ever Batavia
- Mascot: Blue Devils
- Team name: Devils
- Yearbook: Batavian
- Feeder schools: Batavia Middle School
- Website: bhs.bataviacsd.org

Batavia High School is a public high school in Batavia, New York, US. It is the only public high school in the Batavia City School District. The school has approximately 600 students and approximately 60 teachers.

== Academics ==
Batavia High School offers multiple education programs including Advanced Placement (AP), Advanced Studies including dual enrollment college credits from Genesee Community College, Career and Technical Education Boces, and Special Education Services.

== Athletics ==
- The Batavia Indoor Track and Field Team has won a combined 33 Sectional Championships (20 girls championships, 13 for boys) and the Outdoor Track and Field team has won 19 Sectional Championships (9 girls championships, 10 for boys).

== Notable alumni ==
- Eddie Allen, former NFL fullback and college football coach
- Don Bosseler, retired NFL fullback, member of College Football Hall of Fame
- David Buckel (class of 1975), LGBT and environmental activist, self-immolated in Prospect Park to protest climate change
