= Norwich City School District =

School district in New York, United States

Location
- Norwich, New York United States

District information
- Motto: Learning...A Lifelong Experience
- Grades: K-12
- Superintendent: Scott Ryan
- Schools: 4

Students and staff
- District mascot: Purple Tornado
- Colors: Purple and White

Other information
- Website: Norwich City School District

Norwich City School District is a school district in Norwich, New York, United States. The district operates four schools: Norwich High School, Norwich Middle School, Perry Brown Intermediate School, and Stanford Gibson Primary School.

== Administration ==
The District offices are located 89 Midland Drive.

=== Administrators ===
- Scott Ryan–Superintendent

=== Board of education ===
- Christopher Olds–President
- Brian Reid–Vice President
- Brian Burton
- Roz DeRensis
- Kiernan Hamilton
- Debra Phelps
- Clyde Birch, Jr.
- Lauren Van Beers–District Clerk
- Pamela Salvati–Assistant District Clerk

=== Selected Former Superintendents ===
- Albert S. Brown
- Robert L. Cleveland–2004-2005
- William H. Kennedy–?-2004

== Norwich High School ==
Norwich High School

Location
- 89 Midland Drive; Norwich, United States, New York 13815

Information
- Principal: Scott Graham
- Teaching staff: 65
- Grades: 9-12
- Colors: Purple and White
- Mascot: Purple Tornado
- Team name: Purple Tornado
- Rival: Oneonta Yellowjackets
- Athletic Director: Joe Alger
- Website: Norwich High School

Norwich High School is located at 89 Midland Drive and serves grades 9 through 12. The current principal is The current principal is Scott Graham.

=== History ===
==== Selected former principals ====
- James B. Waters (Principal - Bainbridge-Guilford Junior/Senior High School, retired)
- John Ross–2001-2006
- Thomas Knapp–2006-2008
- Robert Cleveland

== Norwich Middle School ==
Norwich Middle School

Information
- Type: Public, Coeducational
- Principal: Terence Devine
- Teaching staff: 56
- Grades: 6-8
- Hours in school day: 6
- Slogan: PRIDE IN OUR SCHOOL...PRIDE IN OURSELVES
- Student Success Coordinator: Ellyse Powers-Leech
- Website: Norwich Middle School

Norwich Middle School is located at 89 Midland Drive and serves grades 6 through 8. The current principal is Terence Devine.

=== History ===
==== Selected former principals ====
Previous assignment and reason for departure denoted in parentheses

- Joseph Gutosky
- Kathryn Knapp–?-2004
- Edward Peters–2004-2005
- Lisa Schuchman (unknown, named Principal of Norwich High School)

== Perry Browne Elementary School ==
Perry Browne Intermediate School

Information
- Type: Public, Coeducational
- Principal: Sara Gilbeau
- Grades: 3-5
- Hours in school day: 6
- Slogan: a great place to teach, learn, lead and leave a legacy
- Website: Perry Browne School

Perry Browne Intermediate School is located at 31 Beebe Avenue and serves grades 3 through 5. The current acting principal is Sara Gilbeau.

=== History ===
==== Selected former principals ====
- Russell Perlman
- Lelan G. Brookins–?-2004
- Michelle Donlon–2004-2007
- Heather Collier–2007-2009

== Stanford J. Gibson Elementary School ==
Stanford J. Gibson Primary School

Information
- Type: Public, Coeducational
- Principal: Jennifer Oliver
- Staff: 56
- Teaching staff: 40
- Grades: K-2
- Hours in school day: 6
- Slogan: Improving Tomorrow by Learning Today
- Team name: Little Twisters
- Student Success Coordinator: Alysa Law-Shearer
- Website: Stanford Gibson Primary School

Stanford J. Gibson Primary School is located at 7 Ridgeland Road and serves grades K through 2. The current principal is Jennifer Oliver.
