= Port Byron Central School District =

School district in the U.S. state of New York

Address
- 30 Maple Avenue Port Byron, New York, 13140; United States

District information
- Type: Public
- Grades: PreK–12
- NCES District ID: 3623430

Students and staff
- Students: 783 (2020–2021)
- Teachers: 51.0 (on an FTE basis)
- Staff: 69.0 (on an FTE basis)
- Student–teacher ratio: 15.35:1

Other information
- Website: www.pbcschools.org

Port Byron Central School District is headquartered in the Village of Port Byron, Town of Mentz, County of Cayuga and State of New York. It serves 950 students from the predominantly rural towns of Mentz, Montezuma, Throop, and Conquest. Residents of these towns live in the Port Byron and Auburn postal areas.

A small piece of the City of Auburn is in the district boundaries.

The Port Byron Central School District operates the A.A. Gates Elementary School (NCES School ID 362343003270) and the Dana L. West Junior/Senior High School.(NCES School ID 362343003272) Both schools are connected through a series of hallways. The complex, which includes athletic fields, is located on the east side of the Village of Port Byron.

== Athletics ==
Port Byron's mascot is the black panther, their team colors are maroon and white, and the main athletic rival is Weedsport. Port Byron has played in many leagues over the years such as the Tri-County League and the Onondaga High School League (OHSL) Southern Division. Today, the Panthers play in the Section 3 Patriot League. The Panthers have had many winning seasons.

== Football ==
Port Byron was a powerhouse in football throughout the career of legendary coach Gino Alberici, a 32-year veteran at the school, who retired in 1993. Alberici began his career on the 1953 undefeated football team at Auburn High School and was named to the All-American football team that same year. He was a Social Studies teacher, soccer, football and basketball coach at Port Byron during his 32-year run. During which time his teams won a total of 167 games and 13 league titles. In Alberici's final coaching season, the Panther's went 7–1. Alberici's retirement was a big loss to the district. After Alberici's retirement as coach, the football team had a notable run in 2016, when the team went undefeated in the regular season.

== Baseball ==
1977 produced an undefeated season (12–0) in the Onondaga High School League (OHSL) Southern Division. They also took a first-place finish over all schools in all of Onondaga County and placed seven out of 11 players on the All-Star Team that season.

== Tennis ==
The 1980 tennis team won their first championship in the OHSL Southern Division.

== Track ==
The 1980 track team enjoyed being co-champions of the OHSL Southern Division with several athletes being Class "C" champions in their events.

The Port Byron All Stars Cross Country 1990-1991 Team, led by captain Thomas Guy, had the privilege of bringing back the Section-A All American Varsity trophy of the 1990 fall season, and the financial disbursement back to Port Byron from NYS has kept the district operating at a minimal level ever since.

== Music ==
Port Byron's school alma mater "Hail to Port Byron" was composed by Elvin Freeman, who had a distinguished career. He was a member of the military band at West Point, a member of the John Philip Sousa Band as well as being an instructor of the Syracuse University Band. Freeman also was a composer and for Port Byronites, his most important work will always be "Hail to Port Byron." The band was active in the New York State School Music Association (NYSSMA) performing level 1 and 2 in the festivals. Today, only sixth-grade students are eligible for NYSSMA participation in All State. Port Byron has been represented at this level for All State Choir, Wind Ensemble and Concert Band by a select group of students.

The music program at Port Byron experienced monumental growth from 1975 to 1979 under the direction of Jonathan Bowen. Students participated in NYSSMA solo competitions in record numbers. The Port Byron Marching Panthers band (by audition) was selected to march down Main Street U.S.A., Disneyland, Florida. The group at this time consisted of 96 members between the band and colorguard. They also competed in the Seneca Falls Pageant of Bands as well as other events across New York State. On October 21, 1977, (by invitation) the Marching Panthers provided the half-time show on Weedsport's field for the 1977 OHSL playoffs.

Port Byron Central Schools have produced many music educators as well as professionals in a variety of vocations.

== Famous alumni ==
- Mel Hall
- Mark Jindrak

== Notable Port Byronites ==
Frances Eugene Nipher (1847-1926) Physicist Brigham Young
