= Batavia City School District =

School district in the U.S. state of New York

Coordinates: 43°0′46″N 78°10′47″W

Address
- 260 State Street Batavia, Genesee County, New York, 14020; United States

District information
- Type: Public school district
- Motto: Where Education Makes a World of Difference
- Grades: K–12
- Superintendent: Jason Smith
- School board: Board of Education of Batavia City Schools
- Schools: 4
- NCES District ID: 3603990

Students and staff
- Students: 2204 (2020–2021)
- Teachers: 217
- Staff: 439
- Student–teacher ratio: 10:1

Other information
- Website: www.bataviacsd.org

Batavia City School District (BCSD) is a public school district headquartered in Batavia, New York.

== Schools ==
- Batavia High School
- Batavia Middle School
- John Kennedy Intermediate School
- Jackson Primary School

== Board of education ==
The school district is overseen by the Board of Education of Batavia City Schools, which is composed of seven duly elected members. As of 2021, the elected members of the board of education include:

Name	Position
John Marucci	President
John Reigle	Vice President
Alice Ann Benedict	Member
Barbara Bowman	Member
Jennifer Lendvay	Member
Chezeray Rolle	Member
Korinne Anderson	Member
