= Education in Westchester County, New York =

School district in New York, United States

Westchester County, New York, in the United States, contains 40 public school districts, 118 private schools, 12 colleges/universities and 3 theological seminaries. According to the 2018 rankings provided by the education website Niche, taking into account public comments, 28 of the top 100 school districts in New York State were located in Westchester County.

== Public school districts ==
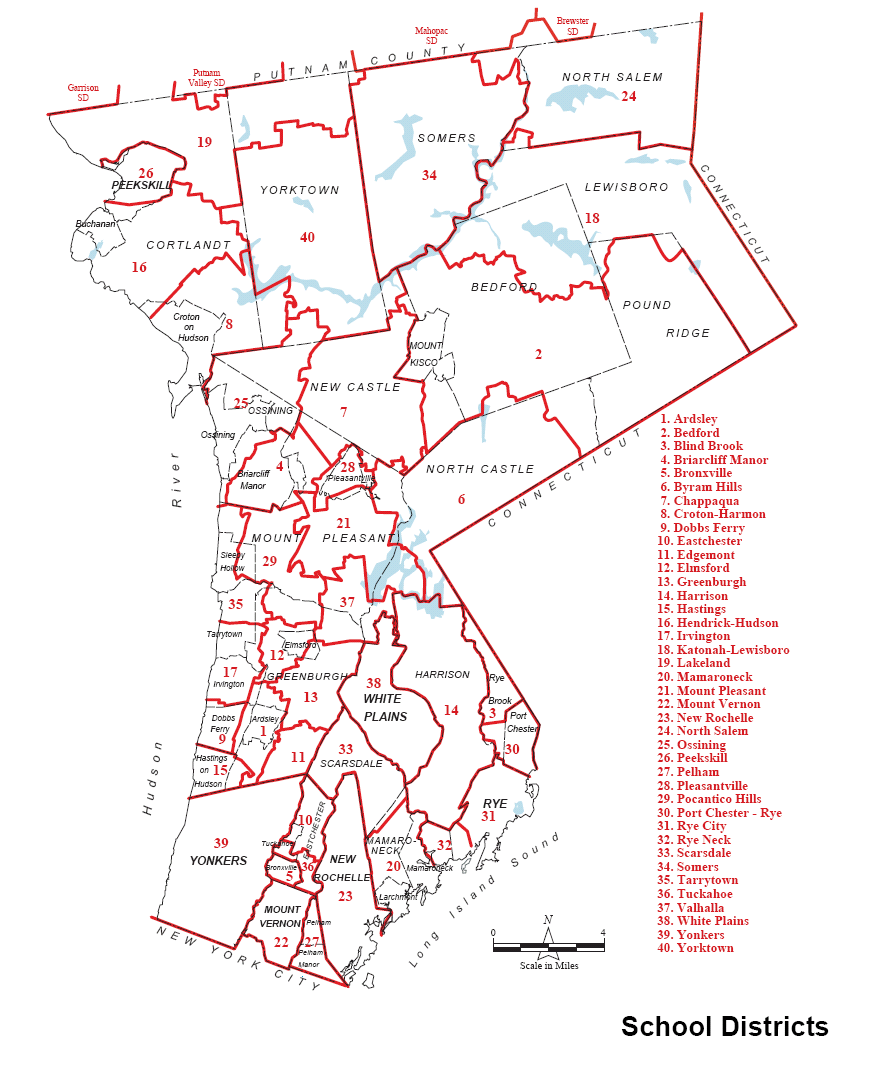
Westchester County Public School Districts

Most school district boundaries do not follow municipal boundaries, but the six city school districts in the county have the same boundaries as their cities.

The districts are as follows:

- Ardsley Union Free School District
- Bedford Central School District
- Briarcliff Manor Union Free School District
- Blind Brook-Rye School District
- Bronxville Union Free School District
- Byram Hills Central School District
- Chappaqua Central School District
- Croton Harmon Union Free School District
- Dobbs Ferry Union Free School District
- Eastchester Union Free School District
- Edgemont Union Free School District
- Elmsford Union Free School District
- Greenburgh Central School District
- Harrison Central School District
- Hastings on Hudson Union Free School District
- Hendrick Hudson Central School District
- Irvington Union Free School District
- Katonah-Lewisboro Union Free School District
- Lakeland Central School District
- Mamaroneck Union Free School District
- Mount Pleasant Central School District
- Mount Vernon City School District
- The City School District of New Rochelle
- North Salem Central School District
- Ossining Union Free School District
- Peekskill City School District
- Pelham Union Free School District
- Pleasantville Union Free School District
- Pocantico Hills Central School District
- Port Chester Rye Union Free School District
- Rye City School District
- Rye Neck Union Free School District
- Scarsdale Union Free School District
- Somers Central School District
- Tarrytown Union Free School District
- Tuckahoe Union Free School District
- Valhalla Union Free School District
- White Plains Public School District
- Yonkers Public Schools
- Yorktown Central School District

This list excludes Special Act Grade Organization districts, which overlap the districts listed above.

== Private schools ==
High Schools

- Archbishop Stepinac High School, White Plains
- Blessed Sacrament-St. Gabriel High School, New Rochelle
- Daytop Village Secondary School, Hartsdale
- French-American School of New York, Mamaroneck
- German School of New York, White Plains
- Hackley School, Tarrytown
- Hallen Center, New Rochelle
- The Harvey School, Katonah
- Iona Preparatory School (Upper School), New Rochelle
- John F. Kennedy Catholic High School, Somers
- The Karafin School, Inc., Somers
- Keio Academy of New York, Purchase
- The Leffell School, Hartsdale
- Maria Regina High School, Hartsdale
- The Masters School, Dobbs Ferry
- The Montfort Academy, Mt. Vernon
- New York School for the Deaf, White Plains
- Rye Country Day School, Rye
- Sacred Heart High School, Yonkers
- Salesian High School, New Rochelle
- School of the Holy Child, Rye
- Thornton Donovan School, New Rochelle
- The Ursuline School, New Rochelle
- Westchester Hebrew High School, Mamaroneck
- Yeshiva Farm Settlement School, Mount Kisco
- Yeshivath Ohr Hameir, Peekskill

Elementary, Junior High and Special Schools

- Academy of Our Lady of Good Counsel, White Plains
- Annunciation School, Crestwood
- Bedford Christian School, Bedford
- Bereshith Cultural School, Mount Vernon
- Berjan School, Mamaroneck
- Blessed Sacrament Elementary School, New Rochelle (closed)
- Cardinal McCloskey School, Ossining
- The Caring Place, New Rochelle
- The Chapel School, Bronxville
- Christ the King School, Yonkers
- The Clear View School, Briarcliff Manor
- Corpus Christi-Holy Rosary School, Port Chester
- Eyes & Ears World, Inc., Yonkers
- Ferncliff Manor, Yonkers
- French-American School of New York, campuses in Mamaroneck, Larchmont, and Scarsdale
- The Garden Road School, Crompond
- German International School New York, White Plains
- Hackley School, Tarrytown
- Hallen Center, New Rochelle
- Harvey School, Katonah
- Hawthorne Country Day School, Hawthorne
- Holy Name School, New Rochelle
- Holy Name of Jesus School, Valhalla
- Hudson Country Montessori School, New Rochelle
- Immaculate Conception School, Irvington
- Immaculate Conception School, Tuckahoe
- Immaculate Heart of Mary School, Scarsdale
- Immanuel Lutheran School, Mount Vernon
- Iona Preparatory School (Lower School), New Rochelle
- Jean Grey School for Higher Learning, North Salem
- Leake & Watts Children's Home School, Yonkers
- The Leffell School, Hartsdale
- Martin Luther King Child Development Ctr., New Rochelle
- Milestone School, Fleetwood
- Mohawk Country Home School, White Plains
- Mount Tom Day School, New Rochelle
- The Northern Westchester Chinese School, Yorktown
- Oakview Prep of SDA, Yonkers
- Orchard School - Andrus Child Home, Yonkers
- Our Lady of Assumption School, Peekskill
- Our Lady of Fatima School, Scarsdale
- Our Lady of Mt. Carmel School, Elmsford
- Our Lady of Sorrows School, White Plains
- Our Lady of Victory School, Mount Vernon
- Our Montessori School Yorktown, Heights
- Resurrection School, Rye
- Ridgeway Nursery School & Kindergarten, White Plains
- Rippowam Cisqua School, Bedford
- Rye Country Day School, Rye
- Sacred Heart, Yonkers
- Sacred Heart School, Hartsdale
- Sacred Heart / Mt. Carmel School - Arts, Mount Vernon
- SS John & Paul School, Larchmont
- SS Peter & Paul School, Mount Vernon
- St. Ann School, Ossining
- St. Anthony School, West Harrison
- St. Anthony School, Yonkers
- St. Augustine School, Ossining
- St. Bartholomew School, Yonkers
- St. Casimir School, Yonkers
- St. Columbanus School, Cortlandt Manor
- St. Eugene School, Yonkers
- St. Gregory the Great School, Harrison
- St. John the Baptist School, Yonkers
- St. Joseph School, Bronxville
- St. Joseph's School, Croton Falls
- St. Jude Habilitation Institute, Tarrytown
- St. Mark Lutheran School, Yonkers
- St. Mary School, Yonkers
- St. Patrick School, Yorktown Heights
- St. Peter School, Yonkers
- St. Ursula's Learning Center, Mount Vernon
- Transfiguration School, Tarrytown
- Transitional Learning Center, New Rochelle
- UCP of Westchester, New Rochelle
- Westchester Area School, New Rochelle
- Westchester Day School, Mamaroneck
- Westchester Exceptional Children School, Purdys
- Westchester School for Special Children, Yonkers
- Yeshiva Day School of Lincoln Park, Yonkers
- Yonkers Christian Academy, Yonkers

== Colleges and universities ==
- College of Westchester, White Plains
- Fordham University, West Harrison
- Iona University, New Rochelle
- Long Island University, Westchester Graduate Campus at Purchase College, Purchase
- Manhattanville University, Purchase
- Mercy University, Dobbs Ferry
- Monroe University, New Rochelle
- New York Medical College, Valhalla
- Pace University, Pleasantville and White Plains
  - Lublin School of Business
  - Pace University School of Law
- Purchase College, State University of New York, Purchase
- Sarah Lawrence College, Yonkers
- Westchester Community College, Valhalla

=== Seminaries ===
- Academy for Jewish Religion, Yonkers
- St. Joseph's Seminary and College, Dunwoodie, Yonkers
- St. Nersess Armenian Seminary, Armonk
- Saint Vladimir's Orthodox Theological Seminary, Crestwood, Yonkers

== Weekend supplementary schools ==
The Japanese Weekend School of New York, a Japanese weekend supplementary school, holds classes at Port Chester Middle School in Port Chester.

== Organizations ==
The Japanese Educational Institute of New York (JEI; ニューヨーク日本人教育審議会 Nyūyōku Nihonjin Kyōiku Shingi Kai), a nonprofit organization that operates two Japanese day schools and two weekend school systems in the New York City area, has its headquarters in Rye.
