= AHHS =

AHHS may refer to:

- Abington Heights High School, Clarks Summit, Pennsylvania, US (Scranton–Wilkes-Barre–Hazleton metropolitan area)
- Alamo Heights High School, Alamo Heights, Texas, US (San Antonio metropolitan area)
- Alexander Hamilton Historical Society
- Alexander Hamilton Jr./Sr. High School, Elmsford, New York, US (New York City metropolitan area)
- Andrew Hill High School, San Jose, California, US
- Arlington Heights High School, Fort Worth, Texas, US
