= John Donohue =

John Donohue may refer to:

- John "Chickie" Donohue, American former marine
- John J. Donohue III, American law professor and economist
- John P. Donohue, American surgeon and urologist
- John W. Donohue, American architect
