= John P. Donohue =

American physician and urologist

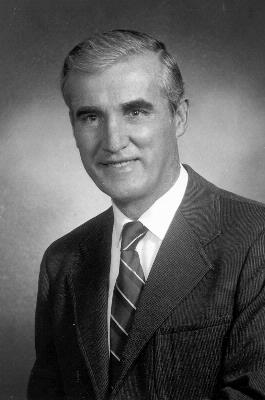
- Circa 1994
- Born: December 25, 1932; Westchester, New York, U.S.
- Died: September 4, 2008 (aged 75); Drummond Island, Michigan, U.S.
- Education: College of the Holy Cross (BA); Cornell University (MD)
- Known for: Testicular cancer treatment
- Medical career
- Profession: Surgeon
- Institutions: Indiana University School of Medicine
- Sub-specialties: Urology
- Awards: Barringer Medal (1988); Distinguished Career Award (1994); Distinguished Contribution Award (1994); I.U. President's Medal for Excellence (1996); Hugh Hampton Young Award (1998); Huggins Medal (2001); Ferdinand C. Valentine Medal; Sanctae Crucis Award (2005); Ramon Guiteras Award (2005); Keyes Medal (2008)

John P. Donohue (December 25, 1932 – September 4, 2008) was an American physician and urologist. He was the Chairman of the Urology Department and Distinguished Professor Emeritus at the Indiana University School of Medicine. He pioneered treatments for testicular cancer, including the nerve-sparing technique. His work with Lawrence Einhorn led to an increase in cure rate of testicular cancer from 5% to 90%. He studied under Wyland F. Leadbetter. He began his career as a United States Navy officer while serving as the ship's surgeon aboard the aircraft carrier USS Wasp.

== Training ==
Donohue graduated from Iona Preparatory School, New Rochelle, New York. He studied at the College of the Holy Cross in Worcester, Massachusetts, graduating in 1954. He received his medical degree from Cornell University Medical College, completed initial surgical training at the New York Hospital and received his urological training at Massachusetts General Hospital. After completing his training, he moved to Indianapolis, Indiana.

== Career ==
Donohue served in the United States Navy reserve from July 1960 to July 1962, achieving the rank of lieutenant. He served on the USS Wasp for one year and the U.S. Naval Hospital Chelsea, Massachusetts for one year. Early in his career, he was the chairman of a committee to develop new and better techniques for kidney transplants. This committee developed two highly specialized areas, one includes use of artificial kidneys and the other is based on tissue typing to match donors and recipients to reduce transplant rejection. This was on the heels of the passing of the Uniform Anatomical Gift Act, which Donohue identified as making it logistically easier to perform transplants.

In 1971, he became Professor of Urology and Chairman of the Department at Indiana University School of Medicine. While in this position, he became renown in the field of testicular tumors and renal hypertension. He authored numerous articles on testicular cancer and developed a radical surgery to treat it. He was on the team at the Indiana University Cancer Center treated cyclist Lance Armstrong for testicular cancer.

== Later years ==
Donohue retired to Melbourne Beach, Florida. He was buried at Saint Joseph Catholic Cemetery in Palm Bay, Florida.
