= Irvington High School (New York) =

Public school in Irvington, New York, US

Coordinates: 41°02′26″N 73°51′39″W

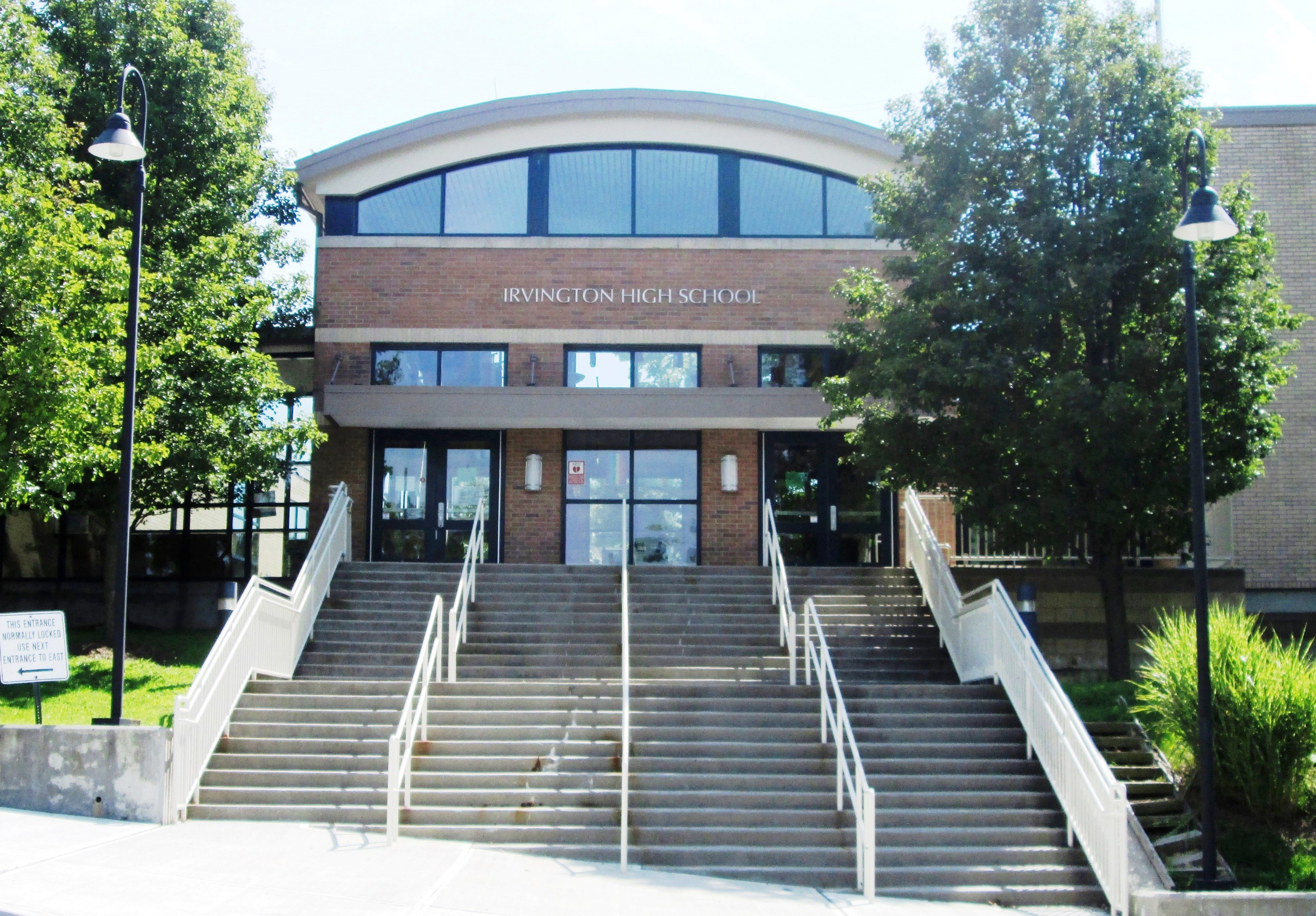
- entrance (2016)
- 40 North Broadway; Irvington, New York, U.S.

Information
- Type: Public
- Motto: Ad astra per aspera ("Through hardships, to the stars")
- School district: Irvington Union Free School District
- Principal: Jonathan Hirsch
- Teaching staff: 49 full-time
- Grades: 9–12
- Enrollment: 543 (2020–2021)
- Student to teacher ratio: 11.1
- Colors: Green and white
- Mascot: Bulldog
- Assistant Principal: Michelleann DeFilippis
- Website: www.irvingtonschools.org/ihs

Irvington High School (IHS) is a public high school in Irvington, New York, United States. It is part of the Irvington Union Free School District in Westchester County. It is on the same campus as the middle school and shares a cafeteria and library.

== Academics ==
In 2021, Irvington High School's graduation rate was 98%. Of the school body, 96% are proficient in reading, and 95% are proficient in mathematics. Of seniors, 84% had taken at least one Advanced Placement exam, and 75% had passed at least one Advanced Placement exam.

== Student body ==
In 2021, 71% of the student body was white, 11% was Asian, 7% was black, 7% was Hispanic, 4% was multiracial, and 1% was Native American. There are around 130-140 students per grade.

== Rankings ==
In 2015, U.S. News & World Report rated IHS as #32 in New York State, making it the ninth-best in Westchester.

The next year it was ranked as #198 in the United States, and #35 in New York – which was the 10th best in Westchester – with a college readiness index of 70.3, and a student-teacher ratio of 12:1. Earlier that same year, 2016, Niche.com, a rating and ranking website, listed IHS as the #83 high school in New York, and the 595th high school in the country.

In 2017, U.S. News & World Report ranked the high school as #45 in New York state, and #377 in the country, which earned it a gold medal for being in the top 500 nationally.

In 2021, U.S. News & World Report ranked Irvington High School #304 nationally and #35 in New York State.

Most recently, in 2023, the U.S. News & World Report ranked Irvington High School #271 in national ranking and #34 in New York State.

== History ==
The Irvington Union Free School District originally had three schools, the Main Street School, which accommodated all students in the area of the village of Irvington; and the Pennybridge School and East Irvington Schools, which took in students from their areas until they reached high school age. After the Dows Lane Elementary School was built, the two outlying schools were eventually closed down, and the Main Street School became the district's high school. By the 1960's the school was over-crowded, and the Irvington School Board purchased property on which to build a new, larger junior/senior high school, encompassing grades 7-12.

In 1785, an officer under General George Washington, named Captain William Dutcher, bought 215 acres of land for 646 pounds, 10 shillings. In 1837, the eastern part of the land was sold to John Ellis, a founder of a locomotive factory located in Schenectady. Ellis later sold the land to Dr. Augustus Corey Richards of Boston, who, in the 1860s, used the property to build a three-story stone cottage with a circular tower that looked like a castle, which he called Cedar Lawn. Isaac Stern, one of the founders of Stern's department store, bought the cottage and the surrounding land. A fire heavily damaged the cottage, and it was torn down in 1961. Stern's grandson sold the property to the Irvington School Board for $133,000.

The new concrete school building, designed in the Brutalist style, opened for the 1965–1966 school year, and the Main Street School – the old high school – was used by the district's fifth and sixth graders. The new school was actually two separate buildings, the academic building in which classes were held, and the activities building, which included the gym, an auditorium, and spaces for vocal music, instrumental music, and shop and health classes. The two buildings were connected by a bridge over a concrete underpass. Within a few years of the school's opening, a demographic bulge has made it necessary to add modular units, called "the Annex", in which many classes for the 7th and 8th grades were primarily held.

The school was extensively renovated in the 1980s.

Before the 2003–2004 school year, new buildings for the high school (grades 9-12) and Irvington Middle School (grades 6-8) were constructed and annexed to the existing high school building, due to the school district's growing population. The activities building was reconfigured and now houses the school's library, as well as a 2nd gym, and an arts and athletics building was constructed to the northeast of the Middle School.

In October 2016, the school dedicated a new football field and track, both named after long-time coaches. Meszaros Field is named after Harold K. Meszaros, an IHS graduate who returned to the school in the late 1950s as a physical education and health and science teacher, football coach and, from 1961, the director of athletics. Meszaros was a resident of Irvington and, for a time, a Village Trustee. He died in 1977. The Oley Track is named for Peter K. Oley, who was a track and field and cross-country coach for 50 years, beginning in 1956. He was inducted into the hall of fame of the New York State Public High School Athletic Association and the Westchester County Sports hall of fame.

== Notable alumni ==
- Ella Jane, singer and songwriter
- Brett Pesce, professional hockey player
- Richard Ackerman, Presbyterian activist and YouTuber
- Zachary Booth, actor
- Maddie Corman, actress
- Eve Marder, professor of neuroscience at Brandeis University winner of the Kavli Prize 2016
- Penny Peyser, actress and filmmaker
- Wally Pfister, cinematographer
- Ellis Pinsky, entrepreneur notable for his alleged involvement in a cryptocurrency theft case
- Jack Rovello, actor

== See also ==
- Irvington, New York
