= White Plains Public Schools =

School district in New York, United States

- White Plains, New York. New York

Information
- Established: 2016–2017
- Authority: United States Department of Education
- Superintendent: Dr. Joseph Ricca.

The White Plains Public School District is a public school district located in White Plains, New York. As of the 2016–2017 school year, the total district enrollment was 7,004 students attending 8 schools in grades Pre-K - 12. As of 2017, the district superintendent is Dr. Joseph Ricca.

== History ==
In 2013 the district began an initiative to increase numbers of racial minority and language minority students in upper division classes after the United States Department of Education concluded that not enough of those groups were present in such courses.

Joe Ricca, previously of the East Hanover School District and the Elmsford Union Free School District, became superintendent of White Plains in 2017.

By 2018 there were more African-American students in upper division courses.

== Schools ==
=== Universal PreKindergarten (grades: Pre-K) ===
For the 2018–19 school year, the White Plains Public Schools will collaborate with several White Plains early childhood agencies to provide a free universal pre-kindergarten program to four-year-olds (children born in the year 2014) who reside in the City of White Plains. Transportation is not provided.

- FSW - Great Beginnings - Universal Pre-K (UPK)
- YMCA - Universal Pre-K (UPK)

=== Elementary (grades: K-5) ===
- Ridgeway Elementary School
- Church Street Elementary School
- George Washington Elementary School
- Mamaroneck Avenue Elementary School
- Post Road Elementary School

=== Middle (grades: 6-8) ===
- White Plains Middle School
  - Eastview Campus (grades: 6th
  - Highlands Campus (grades 7–8)

=== High (grades: 9-12) ===
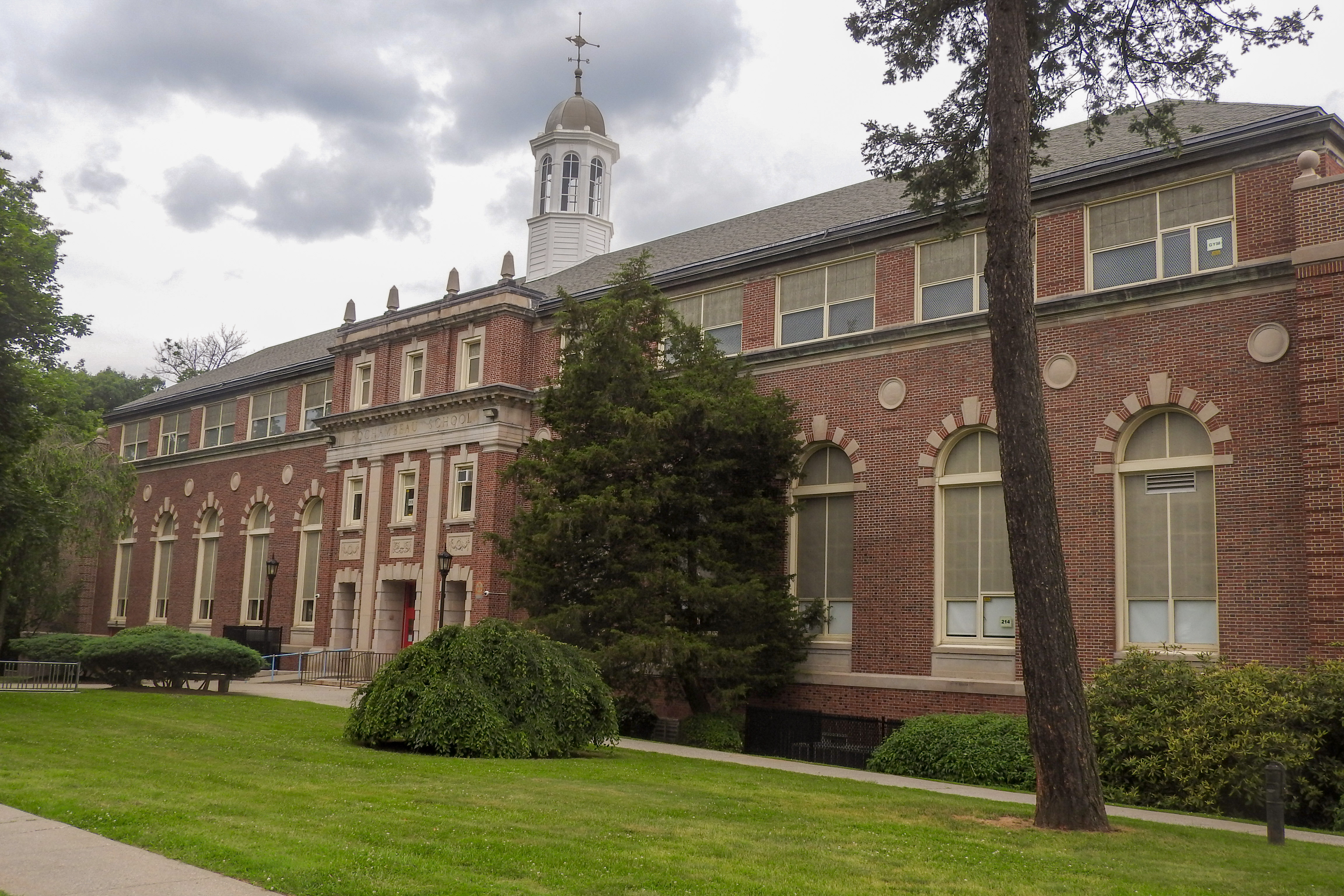
Rochambeau High School

- White Plains High School
- Rochambeau Alternative High School
