= Iona Preparatory School =

Catholic school for boys in New York, US

- logo

Location
- 255 Wilmot Road; New Rochelle, (Westchester County), New York 10804; United States; 40°57′50″N 73°47′37″W

Information
- Former name: The Iona School
- Type: Private, all-male
- Motto: Estote Firmi (Be Strong)
- Religious affiliations: Roman Catholic (Christian Brothers)
- Established: 1916 (110 years ago)
- Sister school: The Ursuline School
- President: Br. Thomas Leto, CFC
- Grades: K–12
- Gender: Male
- Enrollment: Upper School: 901; Lower School: 182 (2021)
- Campus size: Upper School: 27 acres (11 ha); Lower School: 10 acres (4 ha)
- Colors: Maroon and gold
- Team name: Gaels
- Rival: Fordham Preparatory School; Archbishop Stepinac High School
- Accreditation: Middle States Association of Colleges and Schools
- Publication: Renaissance (literary magazine)
- Newspaper: The Gael Force
- Yearbook: Saga
- Tuition: Pre-Kindergarten through third grade – $13,150 (2025-2026) Fourth grade through fifth grade – $16,000 (2025-2026) Sixth grade through eighth grade – $18,100 (2025-2026) Upper school - $21,400 (2025-2026)
- Website: ionaprep.org

Iona Preparatory School, or simply Iona Prep, is an independent, Catholic, all-male, college-preparatory school located in the north end of New Rochelle, New York, in suburban Westchester County. It consists of the Upper School for Grades 9 through 12 and the Lower School (formerly Iona Grammar School) for kindergarten to grade 8. The primary and secondary schools are located on separate and nearby campuses less than a mile apart on Stratton Road. It is a privately owned independent school without parochial affiliation and is located within the Archdiocese of New York. The school was named for the Scottish island of Iona and was founded in 1916 by the Congregation of Christian Brothers.

Iona Prep is the brother school to The Ursuline School, a local Catholic girls' school, and shares a history with nearby Iona University, which was founded 24 years after the Prep in 1940. The Prep and college shared a common campus at 715 North Avenue until the Upper School completed the move in 1968 to its fifth and current home on a 27-acre (11 ha) campus at 255 Wilmot Road. It includes the formerly separate K-8 Iona Grammar School, now the Iona Prep Lower School, which is located on a separate campus of 10 acres (4.0 ha).

As of 2021, Iona Prep had an enrollment of 1,079 students – 901 in the Upper School and 182 in the Lower School. The Upper School maintains a student dress code that includes a dress shirt and tie with a blazer and dress slacks.

== History ==
=== Founding ===
Upon invitation by Judge Martin J. Keogh, Iona Prep was founded in 1916 by the Congregation of Christian Brothers as The Iona School. Br. Joseph Ignatius Doorley – an educator from County Carlow, Ireland – served as the school's first principal. The institution was established as a Catholic school operated by the Irish Christian Brothers (as they were then known) to educate elementary and secondary school students. The founder of the Order of Christian Brothers, Edmund Ignatius Rice, remained a prominent figure in the school's educational vision. The fledgling Iona School was located at the Stern Estate on Webster Avenue in New Rochelle and rented a facility to accommodate its class of 37 students. It derived its name from the small Scottish island of Iona, known for its Gaelic monasticism that dates back to the arrival in AD 563 of missionary and abbot St. Columba, an important individual in the Christian Brothers' guiding mission.

After three years, the school had outgrown the rather modest capacity of the single building on the estate, and Iona moved to a new 18-acre (7.3 ha) location. The land, which abuts the Beechmont section of New Rochelle and is bounded by North Avenue, was purchased by Br. Doorley from retired Presbyterian minister Rev. Thomas Hall for $85,000 in 1919. This land today is owned and operated by Iona College.

=== Expansion ===
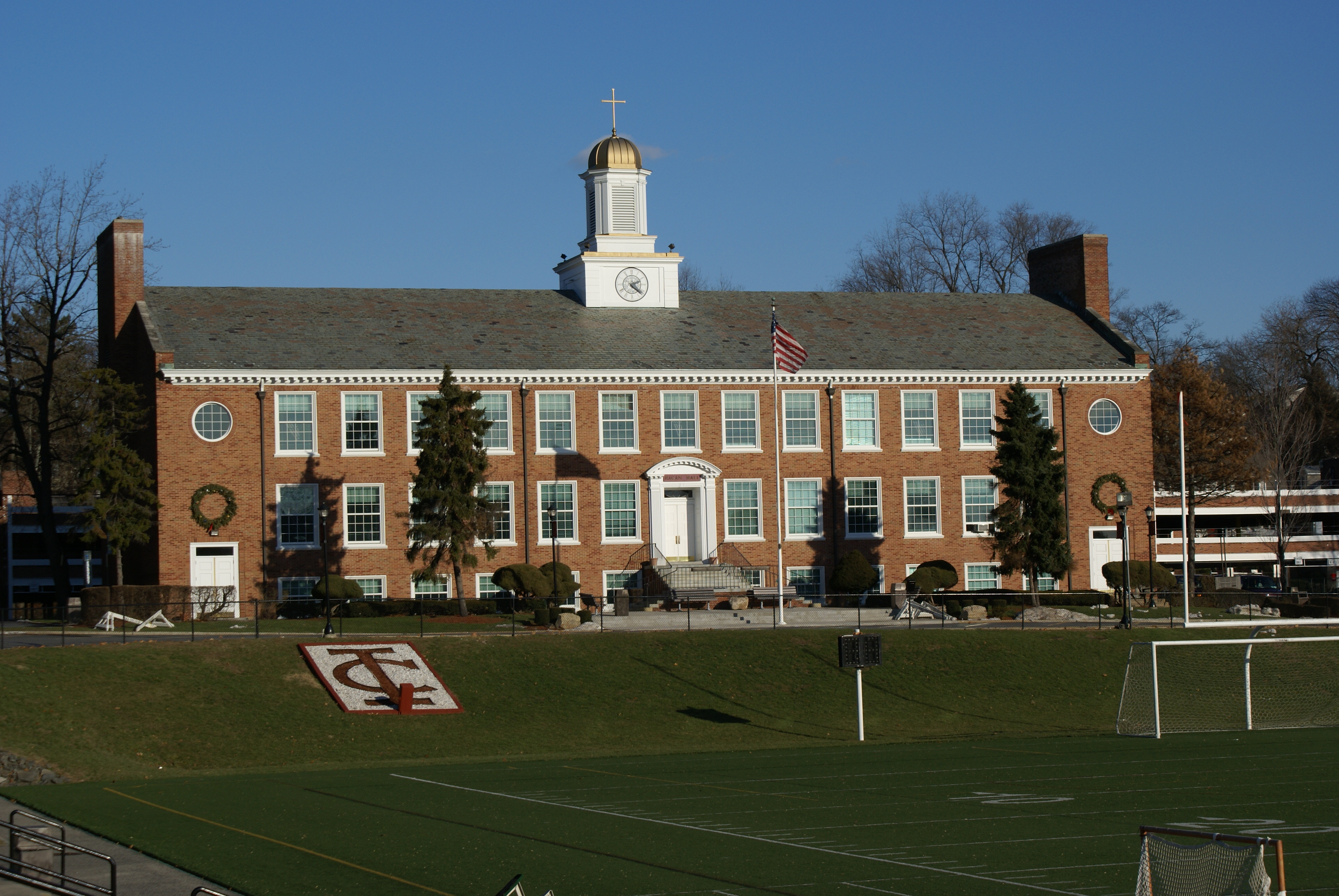
Iona Prep's fourth location is now home to Iona College's LaPenta School of Business

The Iona School again moved to a new home in 1950, albeit this time the move was across its own campus. Its center became the building that is now Hagan Hall, home to Iona College's business school, and remained so for 17 years.

=== 1950s to present ===
In February 1955, Iona Grammar School, serving pre-kindergarten through eighth grade students, relocated to its present campus on Stratton Road, the former home and estate of Harry M. Stevens, a food concessionaire who is sometimes attributed with the invention of the hot dog.

With Iona College requiring increasing space and Iona Prep undergoing continual growth, the Prep saw the need for a campus of its own. After acquiring the 27-acre (11 ha) Matthew Carney Estate on Stratton Road, which was a third of a mile from the Iona Grammar School campus and three miles north of Iona College, Iona Prep broke ground on January 2, 1965, on the present-day campus. By 1968, the move to its current location was complete.

Due to the shared history, name, and cordial relations between the two schools, Iona Grammar was subsumed into Iona Preparatory. The combined Iona Preparatory School now operates under a unified administration across its two campuses called the Iona Prep Lower School and the Iona Prep Upper School.

== Academics ==
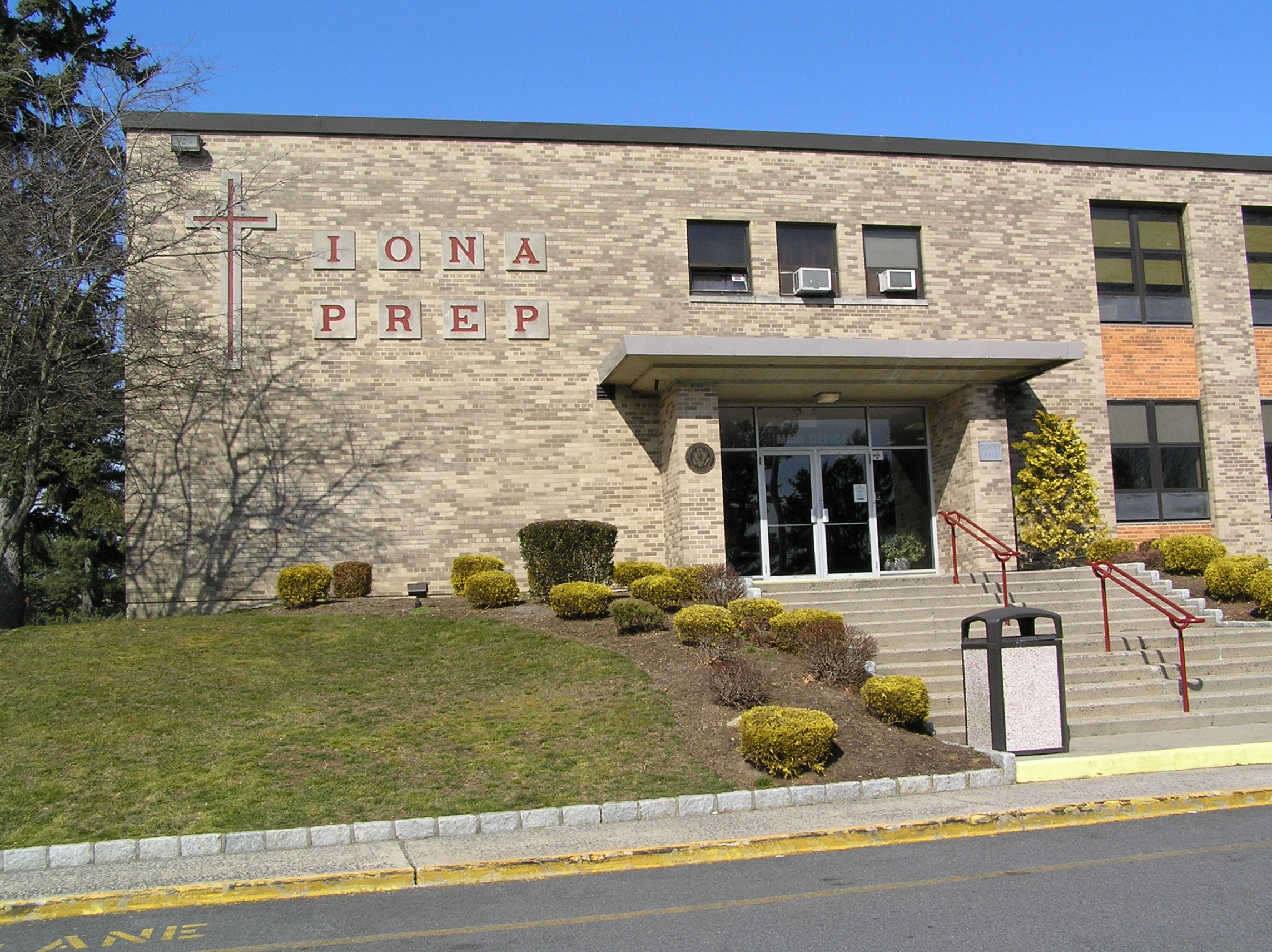
Main entrance to the Iona Prep Upper School, 2012.

Beginning in junior year, students have a number of electives from which they may choose. Additionally, each Upper School student must engage in community service throughout all four years as a requisite for graduation.

Iona Prep was named a National Blue Ribbon School by the U.S. Department of Education in 2001 and 2002, which is considered "the highest honor an American school can achieve".

The school annually produces many National Merit Scholars and AP Scholars.

Technology is integrated inside and outside the classroom. Since 2007, Iona Prep has used Edline to inform parents of student performance through bimonthly updates. Students can also monitor academic progress and receive and submit assignments electronically. All classrooms are equipped with Smart Board interactive whiteboard technology.

The biology, chemistry, and physics laboratories were renovated in 2011 and 2013 with state-of-the-art instruments and technology specific to each science.

Iona Prep has three tiers of academics: core, honors, Advanced Placement and a superior talent enrichment program (STEP). The following 14 Advanced Placement courses are offered annually: Biology, Chemistry, Physics, Calculus AB, Psychology, Statistics, English Language and Composition, English Literature and Composition, European History, United States History, World History, US Government and Politics, Italian Language, and Spanish Language.

In addition to the core and honors curricula, Iona offers STEP. STEP is a rigorous two-year program for the most highly qualified freshmen and sophomore students that involves a more intensive study of Latin and mandatory AP and STEP-specific classes in English and history. Advanced-level classes in science, mathematics, and foreign languages are also expected.

Typically, 100% of Iona Prep's graduates go on to attend a four-year higher education institution, ranging from liberal-arts colleges to research universities and from public universities to Ivy League schools.

== Service ==
In addition to a number of service programs in local communities, Iona Prep has several areas of interest throughout the United States and in foreign countries. One of the largest programs is the annual service trip to Lima, Peru in which students and faculty work to better the lives of disadvantaged denizens. Iona Prep also has missions in New Orleans, Washington, DC, Florida, New York City, the Dominican Republic, and at the US-Mexico border in Texas.

== Extracurricular activities ==
=== Speech and debate ===
Iona Prep is known for its speech and debate (forensics) team. In 1999, Iona Prep was the National Forensics League Champion and had multiple national champions in multiple events. The team has experienced continual success, being periodically ranked as first in New York State and among top schools in the United States in the National Speech and Debate Association and National Catholic Forensic League. It has produced many national finalists, particularly from 2011 to 2015.

== Athletics ==
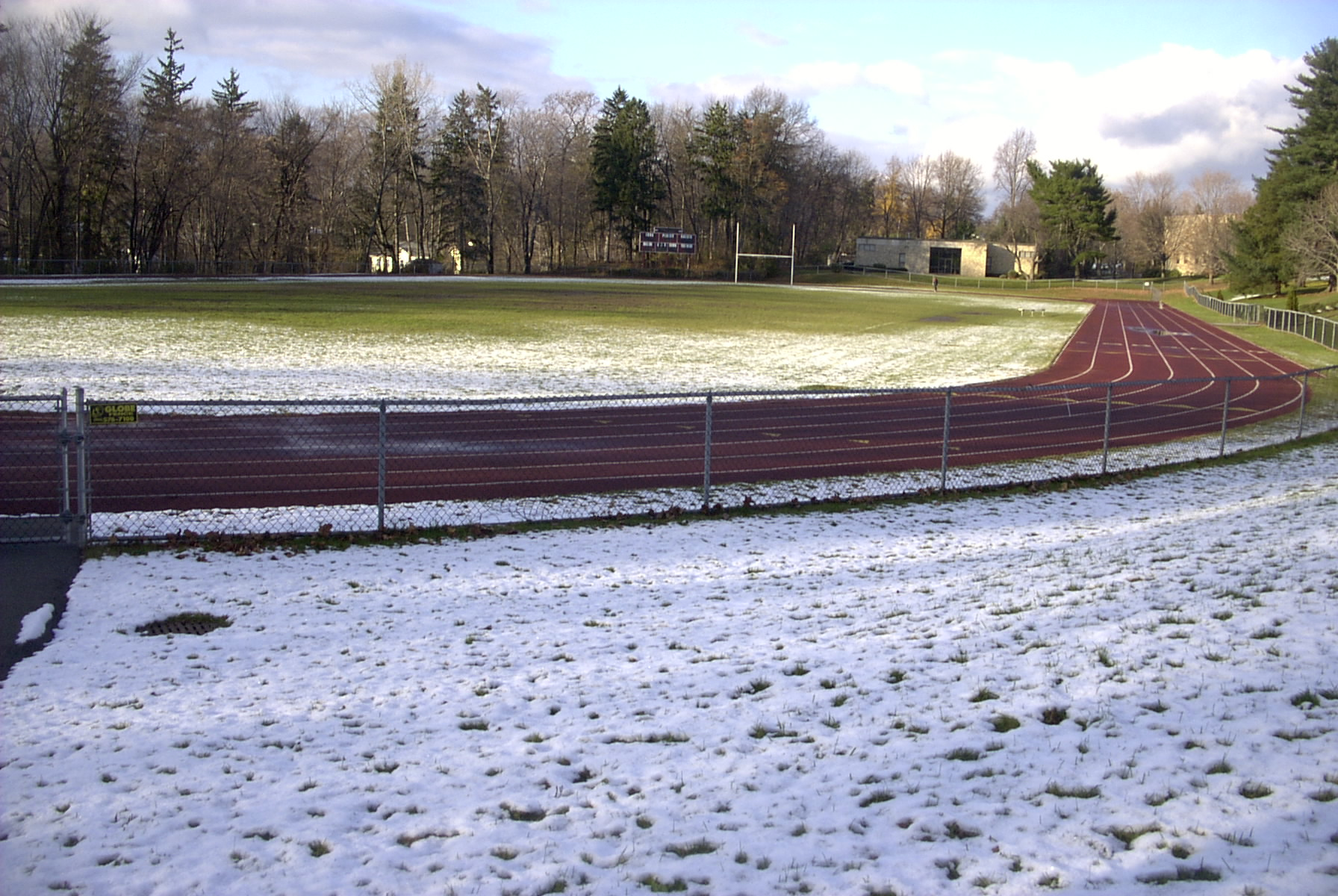
Field and track in early winter

Iona Prep has an array of varsity and junior varsity athletic teams along with intramural teams. A member of the Catholic High School Athletic Association, the Iona Prep Gaels compete against schools from surrounding Westchester, New York City, Long Island, and Connecticut as well as against schools across New York State and the country in iterations of elimination rounds and championships.

The many sports facilities are shared by various teams. The main artificial turf field is used for competition by several of the school's teams including football and lacrosse. It is enclosed by a 400-meter track equipped with steeplechase and long jump areas as well as an electronic scoreboard and a two-story press box. The rear of the school contains an updated baseball field, tennis courts, and areas for field sports. A fitness and weights room was recently renovated for use by athletes.

The sports offered by Iona Prep include:

- Football
- Baseball
- Tennis
- Basketball
- Soccer
- Golf
- Swimming & diving
- Lacrosse
- Rowing
- Ice hockey
- Ultimate frisbee
- Wrestling
- Cross country
- Track
- Field sports

- Shot put
- Javelin throw
- Hammer throw
- Discus throw
- Pole vault

- Volleyball
- Bowling

=== Football ===
Football has long been a tradition within Iona Prep's athletics. Competition with rivals including Archbishop Stepinac High School and Saint Anthony's has driven the school's football ambitions. Dating back to coach Renzie Lamb's undefeated 1967 football team, football has been a major focus of the school's athletic spirit.

Iona Prep played New Rochelle High School annually on Thanksgiving Day in a rivalry game called the "Turkey Bowl". This tradition ended with the 2002 game (when Ray Rice was a sophomore at NRHS), due to the advent of a postseason tournament in the Catholic High School Football League and the New York State Public High School Championships.

Iona Prep football team
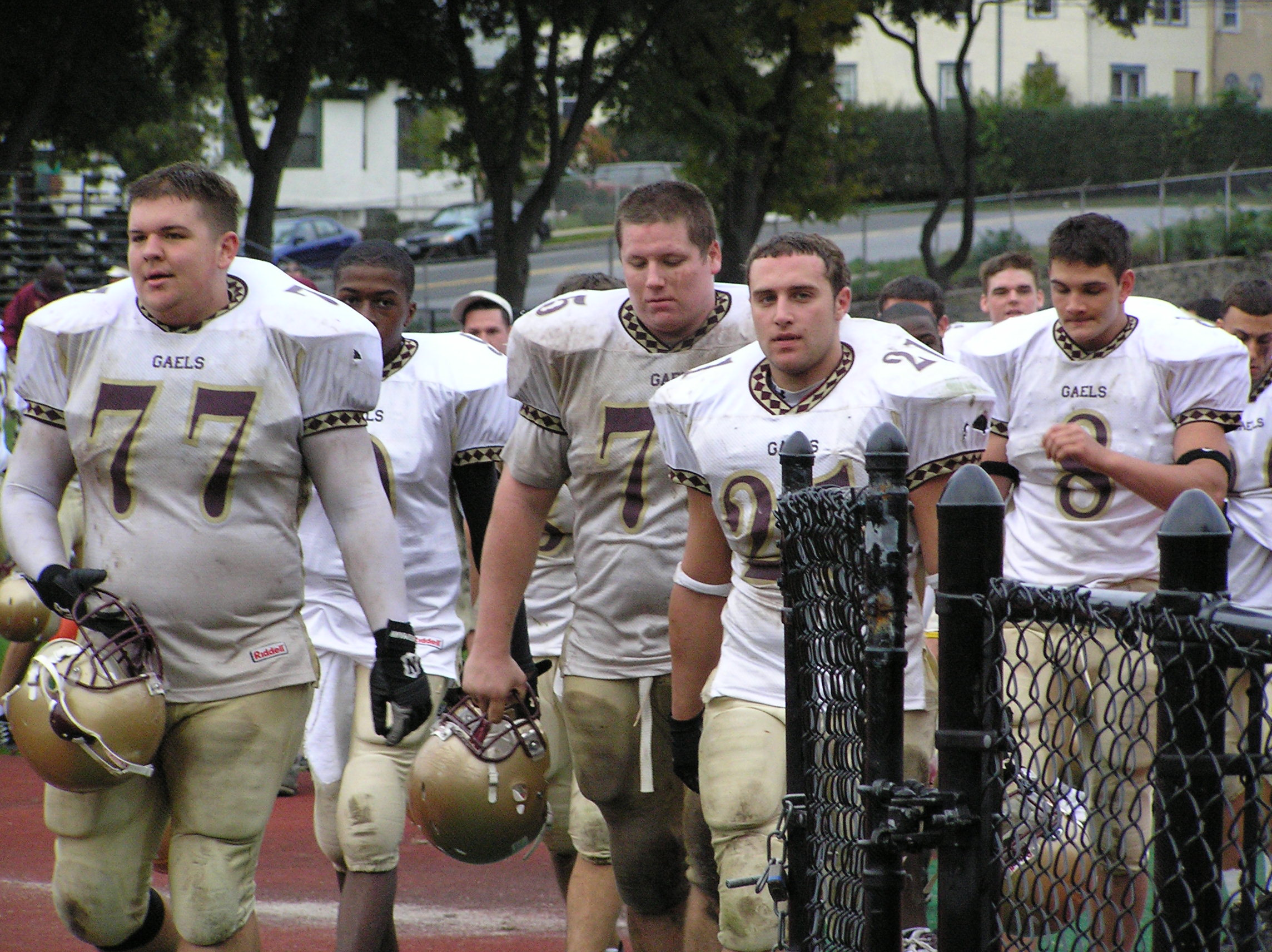
The Gaels leave the field following a victory over Mount St. Michael in October 2004

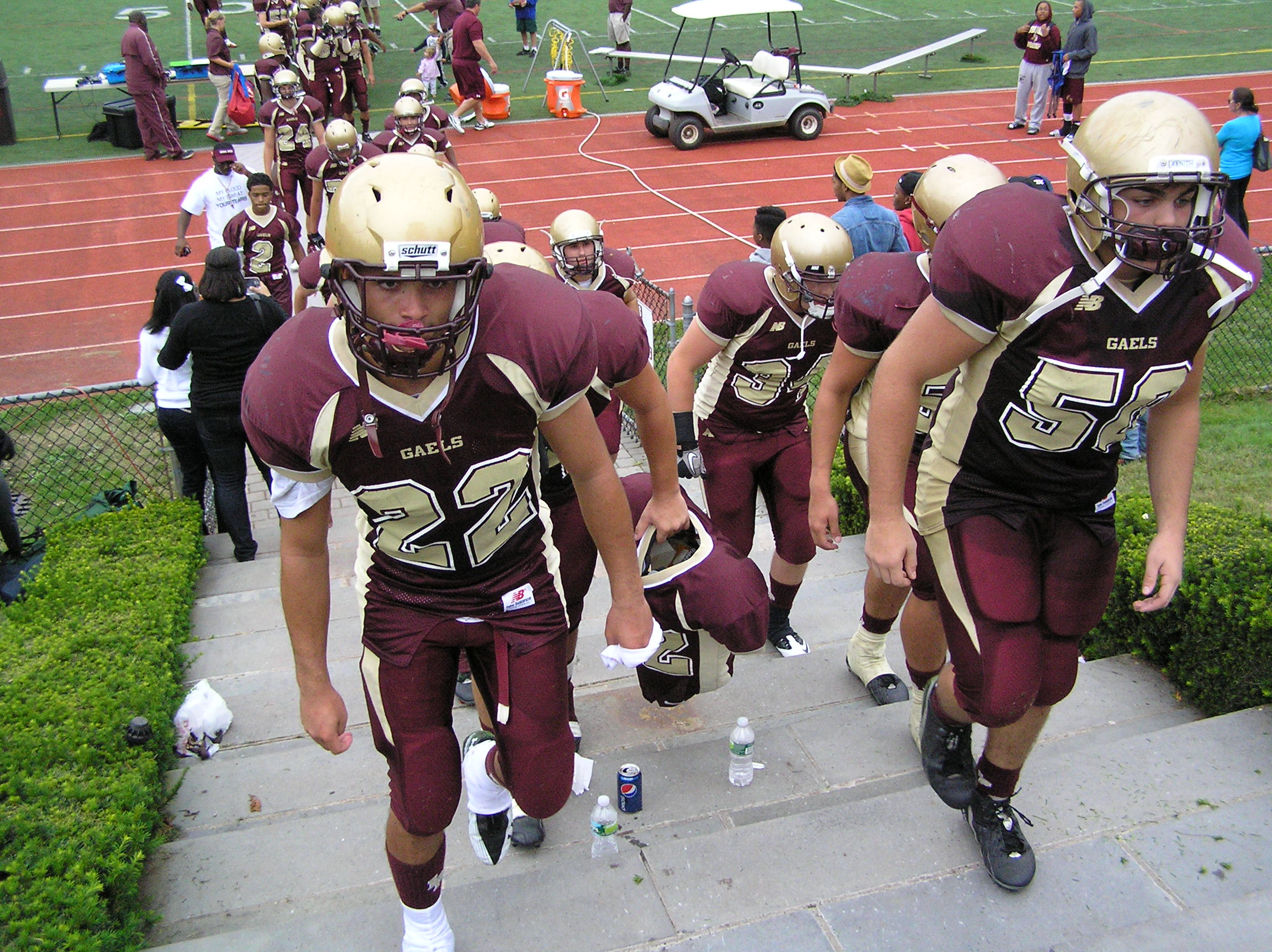
2011 squad leaving the field

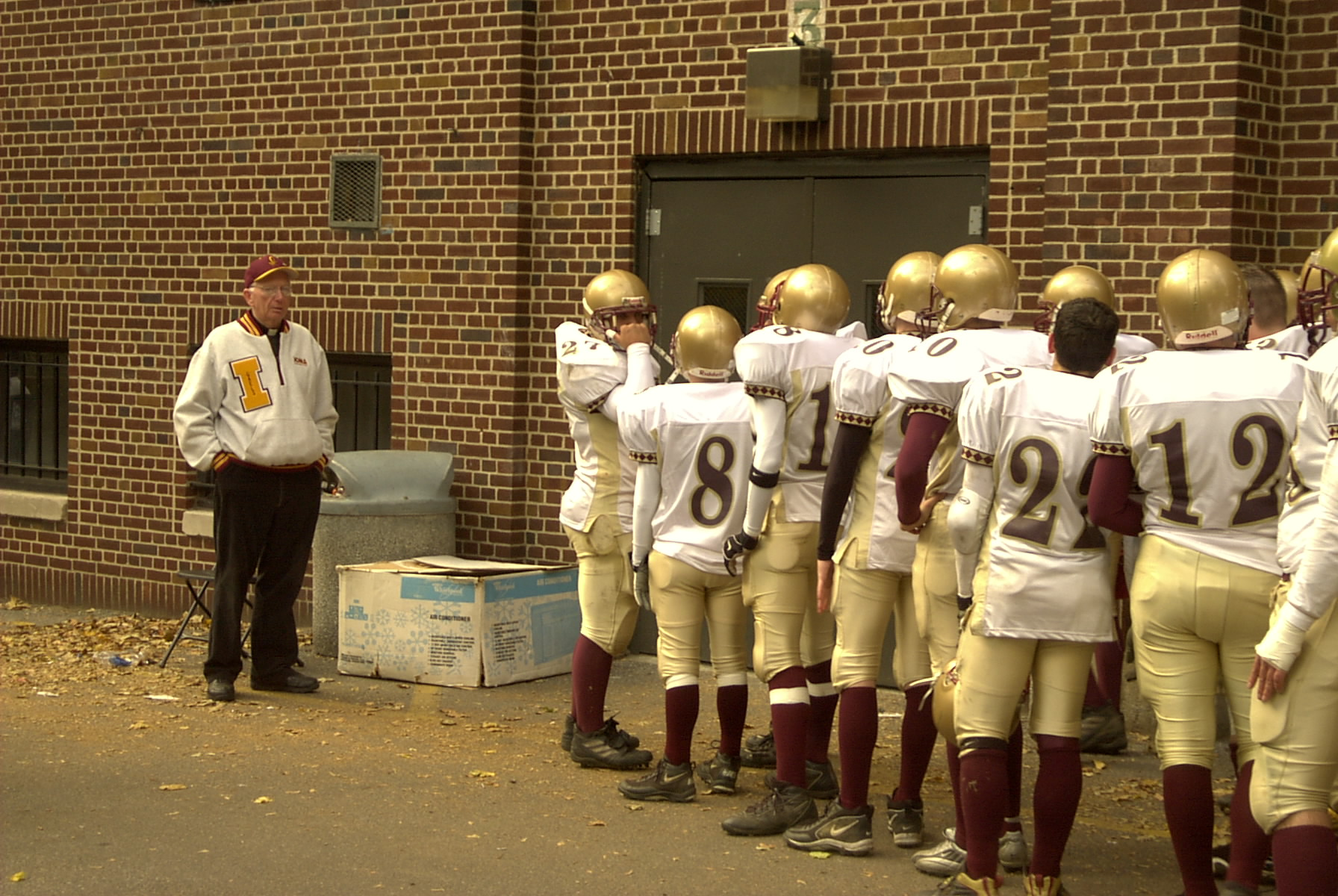
Brother Gaffney with the 2002 team

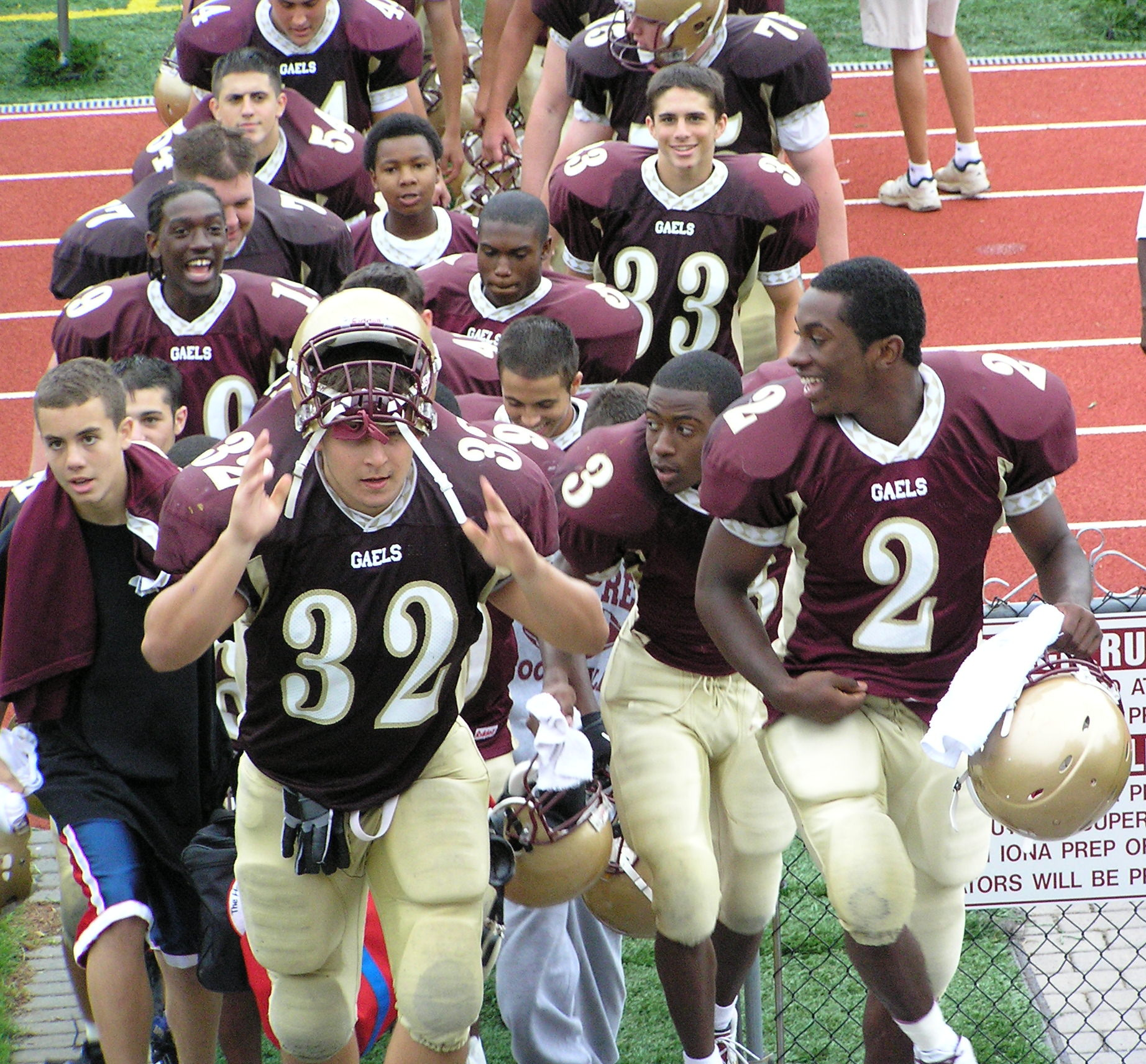
Gaels after a 2004 win

Undefeated and one-loss seasons

- 1931: 8-0
- 1932: 9-1
- 1943: 5-0-2
- 1944: 6-0-2
- 1945: 7-1
- 1946: 8-0
- 1947: 8-0
- 1948: 6-1-1
- 1953: 6-1-1
- 1954: 7-1
- 1967: 8-0
- 1971: 7-1
- 2008: 12-0

CHSFL Championships

- 1954: 7-1
- 1967: 8-0
- 1971: 7-1 (Metropolitan Champion)
- 2000: AA Champion
- 2008: 12-0 (AAA Champion)
- 2016: AA Champion
- 2024: AAA Champion
- 2025: AAA Champion

=== Wrestling ===
Iona Prep Wrestling had been around since 2006 when it was started by the current head coach Thomas Straehle. Since the inception of the program the Gaels have been Westchester County Champions, NYC Divisional Champion, 4x NYC Divisional runner up, 3x CHSAA State runner up and 4x JV City Champions. Iona has had 190 Sectional qualifiers, 65 Sectional place winners, 11 Section Champions, 5 NYSPHSAA State place winner and 2 NYSPHSAA Champion. The program currently has 3 other assistant coaches, John Degl who joined the Iona Prep staff in 2017, Nick Cipriano who joined the Iona Prep staff in 2019, and Eric Fama.

=== Other sports ===
The 2009 varsity basketball team finished with a 26–2 record. Head coach Victor Quirolo, who was also Iona's varsity football coach, a team that went a perfect 12-0 and won the CHSFL AAA Championship, led his squad to victory in the City Catholic High School and the State Catholic High School Championships.

== Notable alumni ==
- Frank Abagnale (1966) - perpetrator of bank fraud in the late 1960s, portrayed by Leonardo DiCaprio in the movie Catch Me If You Can.
- Dick Ambrose (1971) - NFL Player, Cleveland Browns
- Mark Berardo (1986) - singer-songwriter
- James William Colbert Jr. (1938) - physician and academic vice president of the Medical University of South Carolina
- Bud Cort (1966) - actor, best known for Harold and Maude
- Tommy Dreamer (1988) - WWE & ECW pro wrestler
- John P. Donohue, M.D. (1950) - pioneered the development of chemotherapy and nerve sparing surgical techniques for testicular cancer
- Gerard Finneran (1955) – Member of the first United States Air Force Academy graduating class; later worked as investment banker on Wall Street but best known for involvement in 1995 air rage incident.
- Pete Gaudet (1960) - former head basketball coach at Army, former assistant basketball coach at Duke University under Mike Krzyzewski
- Nick Gregory (1978) - television weatherman on Fox 5 News in New York
- Butch Harmon - well-known golf instructor who coached Tiger Woods, attended Iona Prep for one year (1958-'59), before he transferred to New Rochelle High School the following year
- Ty Jerome (2016) - NBA point-guard for the Memphis Grizzlies, won a national championship in 2019 with the University of Virginia
- Justin Joly (2022) – college football tight end for the NC State Wolfpack
- Chris Kerson - film, television, and theater actor, best known for his role in True Detective
- Don McLean (1963) - musician, best known for the 1971 song, "American Pie"
- John Mara (1972) - co-owner of NFL's New York Giants
- Bob Mayo (1969) - keyboardist on Frampton Comes Alive
- L. J. Mazzilli (transferred) - professional baseball player
- Brian Moran (2006) - professional baseball player
- Colin Moran (2010) - professional baseball player
- Tommy Mottola (1966) - Sony executive, ex-husband of Mariah Carey
- Leo J. O'Donovan, S.J. (1952) - former President of Georgetown University
- Lee Patton, Iona Prep coach and hall of fame basketball coach at West Virginia University
- Patrick Pizzella (1972) - Deputy Secretary of Labor (2017–2021) and acting Secretary of Labor (2020), appointee in Reagan, George H. W. Bush, George W. Bush, Obama & Trump administrations
- Alex Raymond (1927) - creator of Flash Gordon comic strip
- Bill Reilly (c. 1956) - founder and chairman of Primedia (now Rent Group).
- Matt Ryan (2015) - American professional basketball player for the New Orleans Pelicans and Minnesota Timberwolves
- Konrad Sheehan - actor and stuntman
- Brian Slocum (1999) - major league baseball player, pitches for the Pittsburgh Pirates
- Donald Spoto (1959) - celebrity biographer and historian

== See also ==
- Catholic Schools in the United States
- List of Christian Brothers schools
- Congregation of Christian Brothers
- Iona College (New York)
- Education in Westchester County
