= Westchester Hebrew High School =

Private Jewish high school in New York, US

Location
- 856 Orienta Avenue, Mamaroneck, New York; United States
- Coordinates: 40.9352°N 73.7254°W

Information
- Other name: WHHS
- Type: Non-public
- Religious affiliation(s): Modern Orthodox Judaism
- Established: 1971
- Head teacher: Jeffrey Beer
- Grades: 9 – 12
- Gender: Mixed
- Language: English; Hebrew
- Campus type: Estate
- Team name: Wolverines
- Website: whhsny.org

Westchester Hebrew High School (WHHS) is a private Modern Orthodox Jewish high school in Mamaroneck, a village in Westchester County, New York, United States.

== History ==
Westchester Hebrew High School (WHHS) was established in 1971 on part of (together with Westchester Day School) the 26 acres (11 ha) Waytes Court estate at 856 Orienta Avenue in Mamaroneck, New York.

The property originally belonged to the de Lancey family. James Fenimore Cooper, who married into the family, made use of the estate as the backdrop for some of his better-known novels. From 1890 to 1945 Waytes Court was so named and occupied by Edwin Henry Weatherbee and his wife Amy Henrietta Constable, who inherited the property from her father James Mansell Constable (August 19, 1812 – May 12, 1900), a founding partner of the high-end Arnold Constable & Company department store. The three-story stone mansion had thirty-one rooms, and was described by The New York Times as "one of the largest on the [Long Island] Sound". The estate was purchased in 1948 by the Westchester Religious Institute of Mamaroneck for the purpose of setting up a school dedicated to Jewish education.

In 1988, WHHS students participated in a Washington, D.C. lobbying effort sponsored by the Student Struggle for Soviet Jewry which sought to bring attention to the plight of refuseniks. In the aftermath of the killing of the infant Yehuda Shoham in the West Bank, WHHS raised money to plant a forest in his memory after his mother delivered a speech at the school. In March 2004, WHHS students joined with others from twenty-nine Westchester County high schools in conducting mock trials, which took place at the Richard J. Daronco Courthouse in White Plains.

== Description ==
WHHS is the only co-educational Modern Orthodox Jewish high school in Westchester County. Both Judaic and New York Board of Regents-accredited general studies are included in the school's curriculum. Modern Hebrew is used in Judaic studies instruction, and is also taught as a conversational language. The State of Israel is a focal point for the school, as is Poland, with senior trips regularly organized for travel to both countries. While many students go on to study in American universities such as Brandeis, Columbia, University of Pennsylvania and Brown, others continue their studies in Israel, or move there.

As a private school, WHHS has benefited from its association with the Partnership for Excellence in Jewish Education, a fundraising organization dedicated to defraying part of the cost of tuition. Parents are encouraged to make additional payments when they can, which are added to a fund designed to help other parents who struggle to make their own tuition payments.

== Enrollment ==
In 2009, WHHS had an enrollment of one hundred students who were raised in Centrist Orthodox families from the U.S. states of New York and New Jersey, along with Fairfield County, Connecticut. Within New York State, students originate from Westchester and Rockland counties, as well as New York City (including the Riverdale area of the Bronx, and Queens).

== Leadership ==
Jeffrey Beer is the current head of school. In the past, Bernard (Baruch) Majerowicz served as headmaster at WHHS, and Joseph Rafalowicz was the school's co-president and treasurer.

== Athletics ==
The school's team—the Westchester Wolverines—is a member of the Metropolitan Yeshiva High School Athletic League. It takes part in various junior varsity and varsity team sports which include basketball, baseball, volleyball, softball, soccer, wrestling, hockey and golf.

== See also ==
- Education in Westchester County
- The Leffell School (formerly Solomon Schechter School of Westchester), a K-12 Jewish day school affiliated with the Conservative Movement
