= Brett Pesce =

American ice hockey player (born 1994)

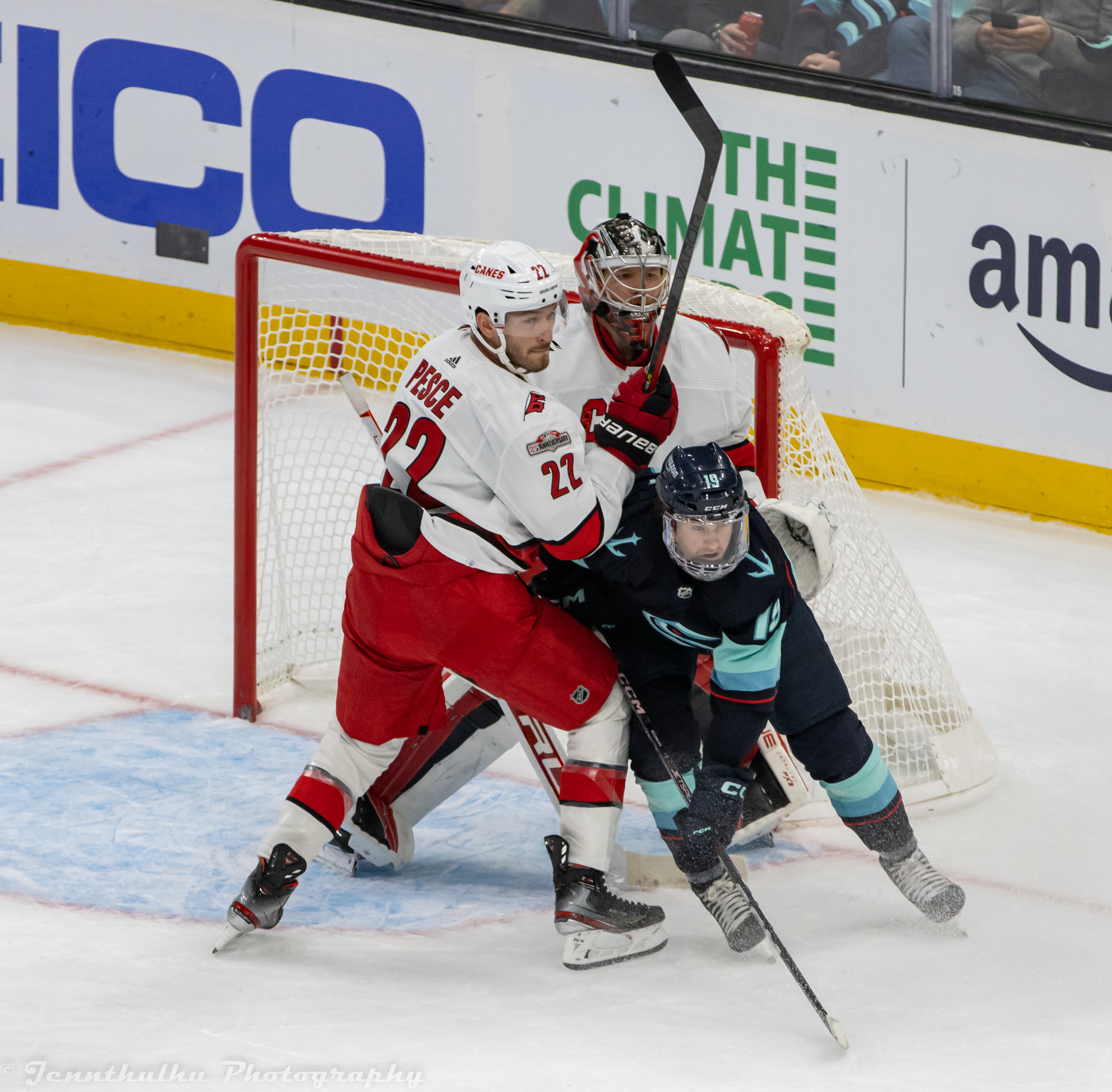
- Pesce in 2022
- Born: November 15, 1994 (age 31) Tarrytown, New York, U.S.
- Height: 6 ft 3 in (191 cm)
- Weight: 200 lb (91 kg; 14 st 4 lb)
- Position: Defense
- Shoots: Right
- NHL team Former teams: New Jersey Devils; Carolina Hurricanes
- NHL draft: 66th overall, 2013; Carolina Hurricanes
- Playing career: 2015–present

Brett Alex Pesce (born November 15, 1994) is an American professional ice hockey player who is a defenseman for the New Jersey Devils of the National Hockey League (NHL). He was drafted 66th overall by the Carolina Hurricanes in the 2013 NHL entry draft.

== Playing career ==
Pesce attended Irvington High School in New York, and played varsity on a joint Irvington-Sleepy Hollow hockey team, graduating in June 2012. He also played his amateur youth ice hockey within New Jersey, eventually playing with the New Jersey Hitmen of the Eastern Junior Hockey League (EJHL). He committed to play collegiate ice hockey with the University of New Hampshire of the Hockey East. After his freshman season with the New Hampshire Wildcats, Pesce was selected by the Carolina Hurricanes in the third round of the 2013 NHL entry draft. In his sophomore season in 2013–14, Pesce set a personal best seven goals and 21 points in 41 games with New Hampshire. In his junior season, Pesce ranked second amongst Wildcats on the blueline in scoring with 16 points in 31 games.

Having played 109 games with the Wildcats, Pesce opted to forgo his final year of eligibility signing a three-year, entry-level contract with the Carolina Hurricanes on March 27, 2015. He was signed to an amateur try-out contract with the Hurricanes' American Hockey League (AHL) affiliate, the Charlotte Checkers, and made his professional debut on April 2, against the Oklahoma City Barons. He appeared in the Checkers' final four homes games to conclude the 2014–15 regular season.

After attending the Hurricanes' 2015 training camp, Pesce was re-assigned to begin his rookie 2015–16 season with the Checkers. On October 14, 2015, Pesce received his first NHL recall by Carolina and was a healthy scratch. He was returned to the Checkers, however during his second recall to the Hurricanes made his NHL debut in a 5–2 loss against the San Jose Sharks on October 24. On November 22, he scored his first NHL goal, and had an assist, to get the Hurricanes a 4–3 win over the Los Angeles Kings.

In the 2019–20 season, Pesce was used in a top-four role with the Hurricanes, posting four goals and 18 points in 61 games from the blueline. On February 22, 2020, Pesce suffered a right shoulder injury against the Toronto Maple Leafs, and was later ruled out for the remainder of the campaign undergoing season-ending surgery.

On July 1, 2024, as an unrestricted free agent, Pesce signed a six-year, $33 million dollar contract with the New Jersey Devils.

== Personal life ==
Pesce is of Italian descent.

== Career statistics ==
=== Regular season and playoffs ===
			Regular season					Playoffs
Season	Team	League	GP	G	A	Pts	PIM	GP	G	A	Pts	PIM
2011–12	New Jersey Hitmen	EJHL	17	1	5	6	18	—	—	—	—	—
2011–12	U.S. NTDP U18	USDP	6	0	0	0	2	—	—	—	—	—
2012–13	University of New Hampshire	HE	38	1	5	6	10	—	—	—	—	—
2013–14	University of New Hampshire	HE	41	7	14	21	6	—	—	—	—	—
2014–15	University of New Hampshire	HE	31	3	13	16	32	—	—	—	—	—
2014–15	Charlotte Checkers	AHL	4	0	1	1	6	—	—	—	—	—
2015–16	Charlotte Checkers	AHL	3	1	2	3	0	—	—	—	—	—
2015–16	Carolina Hurricanes	NHL	69	4	12	16	16	—	—	—	—	—
2016–17	Carolina Hurricanes	NHL	82	2	18	20	20	—	—	—	—	—
2017–18	Carolina Hurricanes	NHL	65	3	16	19	18	—	—	—	—	—
2018–19	Carolina Hurricanes	NHL	73	7	22	29	24	15	0	6	6	0
2019–20	Carolina Hurricanes	NHL	61	4	14	18	27	—	—	—	—	—
2020–21	Carolina Hurricanes	NHL	55	4	21	25	20	11	2	3	5	2
2021–22	Carolina Hurricanes	NHL	70	7	21	28	39	14	1	2	3	6
2022–23	Carolina Hurricanes	NHL	82	5	25	30	43	15	2	4	6	12
2023–24	Carolina Hurricanes	NHL	70	3	10	13	20	2	0	1	1	2
2024–25	New Jersey Devils	NHL	72	3	14	17	29	5	0	3	3	2
2025–26	New Jersey Devils	NHL	37	1	6	7	6	—	—	—	—	—
NHL totals			736	43	179	222	262	62	5	19	24	24

=== International ===
Year	Team	Event	Result	GP	G	A	Pts	PIM
2011	United States	IH18	5th	4	0	1	1	0
Junior totals				4	0	1	1	0
