= United Airlines Flight 976 =

1995 air-rage incident

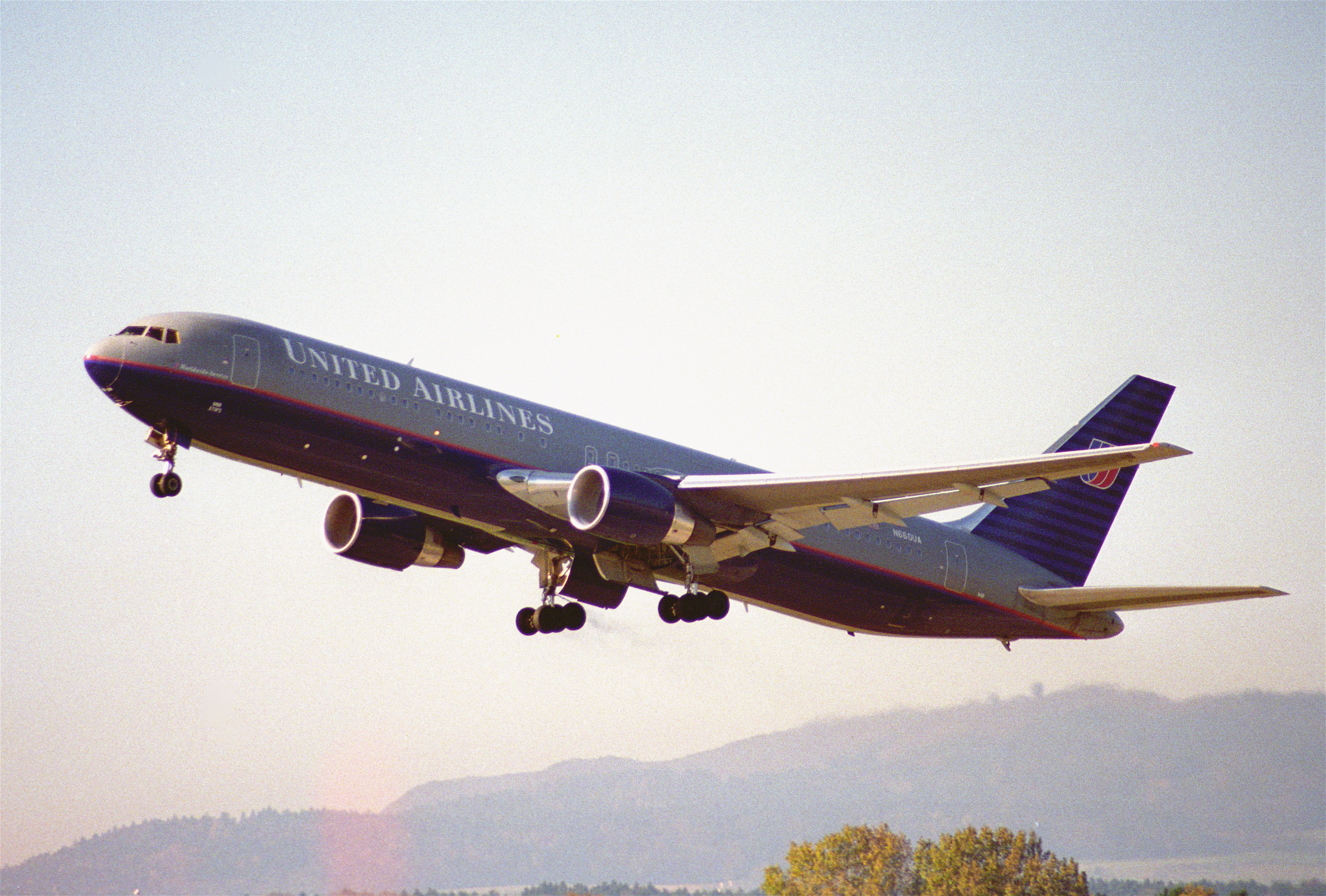
- A United Airlines Boeing 767-300ER similar to the one involved in the incident

Incident
- Date: 20 October 1995
- Summary: Air rage

Aircraft
- Aircraft type: Boeing 767-300ER
- Operator: United Airlines
- Call sign: UNITED 976
- Flight origin: Ministro Pistarini International Airport, Buenos Aires
- Destination: John F. Kennedy International Airport, New York

United Airlines Flight 976 was a regularly scheduled flight from Ministro Pistarini International Airport in Buenos Aires to John F. Kennedy International Airport in New York City on October 19–20, 1995. Upon landing, one passenger, Gerard Finneran, was arrested by the FBI and charged with interfering with a flight crew and threatening a flight attendant.

During the flight, Finneran, a Wall Street investment banker, had been refused further alcoholic beverages when cabin crew determined he was intoxicated. After they thwarted his attempt to pour himself more, Finneran threatened one flight attendant with violence and attacked another one. He then went into the first-class compartment, which was also carrying Portuguese president Mário Soares and Argentinian foreign minister Guido di Tella and their security details. There, he climbed on a service trolley and defecated, using linen napkins to wipe himself, and later tracked and smeared his feces around the cabin.

Food service was canceled due to the unsanitary conditions, and the crew sprayed perfume all over the cabin instead to suppress the smell of feces. The pilots tried to divert to Luis Muñoz Marín International Airport in San Juan, Puerto Rico but were refused since the presence of foreign dignitaries on board created a security risk. Finneran had by then calmed down and returned to his seat.

Finneran's attorneys claimed he had been suffering from a severe case of traveler's diarrhea and had been prevented from using the first-class toilet near his seat just outside that section by Soares's security. He pleaded guilty and was fined $5,000 ($9,000 in 2024), with two years' probation; he had also agreed to perform community service and pay $48,000 ($90,000 in 2024) to reimburse United's cleanup costs and the other passengers for their airfare. The incident has been recalled as the worst case of air rage ever.

== Flight ==
Finneran was a Wall Street investment banker who was then managing director of the Trust Company of the West (TCW). A member of the first graduating class of the U.S. Air Force Academy where he was an athlete, he later got an M.B.A. from University of Michigan's Ross School of Business. He had worked at Citibank and Drexel Burnham Lambert before TCW, becoming an expert on Third World debt, particularly in Latin America. He was returning to his home in Greenwich, Connecticut, near his native Larchmont, New York, where he had graduated from Iona Preparatory School.

Sharon Manskar, one of the flight attendants, recalled that Finneran, seated in first class, had become disruptive even before takeoff from Ministro Pistarini International Airport. After having two glasses of champagne, he demanded to be moved into the row reserved for crewmembers, so they can rest on long international flights, complaining that otherwise he was in the smoking section. Finneran began walking around the cabin, threatening crewmembers (at one point shoving Manskar) and pouring himself more champagne from bottles in the galley, against regulations.

As takeoff approached, Manskar was able to take the champagne bottle away from Finneran and persuade him to return to his seat. After the plane was airborne, Finneran was served another two glasses of red wine. Another crewmember again found him in the galley pouring himself more wine, whereupon he took the bottle back to his seat and secured it between his legs. A male flight attendant approached him and told him "we're going to take a little break from drinking now" to which Finneran responded by later getting out of his seat and threatening to assault the man (in the process delaying the attendant from bringing a first aid kit to another passenger who had complained of illness). After the crew supervisor intervened, Finneran was returned to his seat and appeared to calm down.

A meal was served, after which the crew began drawing the curtains across the entrance to first class. Manskar was taking a break when she felt her seat shake. When she got up, Finneran pushed her through the curtains, then entered the first class galley. He found a drinks cart, climbed atop it, crouched down, lowered his pants and underwear, and defecated on the floor behind it, in full view of other passengers, using the linen napkins to wipe himself.

Tracking his excrement on his shoes, and further wiping the soiled napkins on the walls, Finneran then locked himself in the lavatory. With Manskar's help, his business partner and traveling companion, Susan Bergan, was able to open the lock and returned Finneran to his seat, where they both fell asleep after the crew put a blanket on Finneran to cover the odor of his soiled clothing. The crew sprayed Karl Lagerfeld perfume throughout the aisles of the plane to further mask the smell of feces; food service was also canceled due to the unhygienic conditions. Crew rest periods were suspended to attend to Finneran.

By this point, the plane had reached the Caribbean. The pilots sought to divert to Luis Muñoz Marín International Airport in the hopes of having Finneran taken off the flight. Controllers there refused permission since among the other passengers in first class were Portuguese president Mário Soares and Argentinian foreign minister Guido di Tella and their security details, traveling to New York for the United Nations' 50th anniversary celebrations. Emergency landings with foreign dignitaries aboard, unless the aircraft is malfunctioning, are discouraged due to security risks.

== Arrest and trial ==
After the flight landed at Kennedy in the early morning hours of October 20, Finneran was taken into custody by Port Authority police and arrested by the FBI. He was charged with interfering with a flight crew and assaulting and intimidating a flight attendant and released after pleading not guilty and posting $100,000 bond. Ten days later federal magistrate Joan Azrack granted the prosecution's request to amend the terms of Finneran's bail to require that he attend an alcohol counseling program and not fly anywhere without the court's permission.

Finneran's attorney, Charles Stillman, denied both in court and out that his client's alcohol consumption had anything to do with the incident. "It's all totally false, a horrible lie", he told the New York Daily News. Finneran had been experiencing a severe and acute case of traveler's diarrhea, he said, but Soares' security would not let him use the first-class lavatory even though Finneran himself was in that section. "My client was suffering from a dire medical emergency" which the airline should have attended to.

In February 1996 Finneran pleaded guilty to threatening a flight attendant. He told magistrate judge Steven M. Gold of the Eastern District of New York that he had been angry when the crew stopped serving him alcohol. "I became annoyed and said words that implied a physical threat," which he confirmed were, specifically, "I will bust your ass!" Finneran told Gold that he hoped he was sober in court and had not had any alcohol in the previous 24 hours save a glass of wine with his dinner the night before.

At that hearing Stillman told the court that his client had agreed to reimburse the airline $1,000 for its cleaning costs, as well as every other passenger's airfare, which came to $48,000 ($90,000 in 2024), and do 300 hours of community service. In May he was sentenced to two years' probation and fined $5,000 ($9,000 in 2024). Gold further ordered him to get counseling and not drink when flying.

== Aftermath and legacy ==
Finneran's arrest and the details of the incident made national news and were fodder for popular comedy. A week afterwards, David Letterman read off the "Top Ten Gerard Finneran Excuses", such as "You try drinking for 14 hours and see if you can tell the difference between a food cart and a bathroom" and "Thought he heard somebody yell, 'We're going to crash!' and that was just something he always wanted to do before he died." Spy ranked the incident as No. 22 for 1995 in its annual "Spy 100" list of the least likable things about each year; as a mitigating factor it noted that Finneran's behavior was more entertaining than any in-flight movie would have been.

At the end of 2004, Finneran died of Alzheimer's disease. In the later years of his life, he volunteered with the South Forty Corporation, a not-for-profit organization that helps convicts find employment and housing after their sentences end.

In the years since, the incident has been recalled as the worst case of air rage ever, particularly when compared to other incidents that have made the news. "It'll be hard to ever top that nasty bit of air rage, at least short of an actual act of terrorism", Forbes wrote in 2015 after an incident involving hotel heir Conrad Hilton III on a flight from London to Los Angeles. Writing in The Wall Street Journal in 2006, Eric Felten described the incident as the "nadir" of drunken misbehavior on a flight.

== See also ==
- List of air rage incidents
