= Elmsford Union Free School District =

School district in the U.S. state of New York

Elmsford UFSD

Location
- 98 South Goodwin Avenue, Elmsford (Westchester County) New York 10523 United States
- Coordinates: 41.049826°N 73.816978°W

District information
- Type: Public
- Motto: Dedicated to Excellence
- Grades: PK-12
- Schools: 3
- Budget: $33,482,155 (2016-2017 school year)
- NCES District ID: 3610650.

Students and staff
- Students: 1,117 (PK-12)
- Teachers: 90 (on an FTE basis)
- Staff: 29 (on an FTE basis)
- Student–teacher ratio: 12.41
- Athletic conference: Section 1, Class C
- Colors: Red, Black and White

Other information
- Website: https://www.eufsd.org/

The Elmsford School District, officially known as the Elmsford Union Free School District, is a public school district that serves approximately 980 students in Elmsford, New York in Westchester County.

== History ==
In 2017, the district had 900 students. Joseph Ricca, previously of the East Hanover School District, was superintendent until July 1, 2017, upon becoming superintendent of White Plains Public Schools. Marc Baiocco replaced him in that role.

== Board of education ==
The Elmsford Board of Education is legally responsible for establishing and overseeing the goals and objectives of the school district. The Board is composed of five members, who are residents of the school district, elected to three-year terms. The school board elections are held each May. Included in its general powers are the following: observing and enforcing federal and state education laws and local school board policies, appointing personnel upon the Superintendent's recommendation, appraising programs and services, and adopting the annual school budget. Regular meetings of the Board of Education are held on the first Wednesday of every month.

== Schools ==
The Elmsford School District houses 3 schools across the district.

=== The Carl L. Dixson Primary School ===
The Carl L. Dixson Primary School has seen many changes since it was built, and now serves grades Pre- Kindergarten to 1st grade. The building opened in 1894 as the Hillside Avenue School.

=== Alice E. Grady Elementary School ===
Alice E. Grady Elementary School houses grades 2nd through 6th. The building is named after lifelong village resident, Alice Grady.

An addition was built to Alice E. Grady Elementary School, along with several renovations, in 2000. Included in the project were 4 classrooms, a new library, a new computer lab, an art room, a gazebo, a new gymnasium, and a renovated cafeteria and music room.

=== Alexander Hamilton Jr./Sr High School ===
Alexander Hamilton Jr./Sr. High School (AHHS) contains the district's 7th through 12th grade population. The building is named after the first United States Secretary of the Treasury, Alexander Hamilton.
