= St. Joseph's Catholic Church (Palm Bay, Florida) =

Historic church in Florida, United States

- U.S. National Register of Historic Places
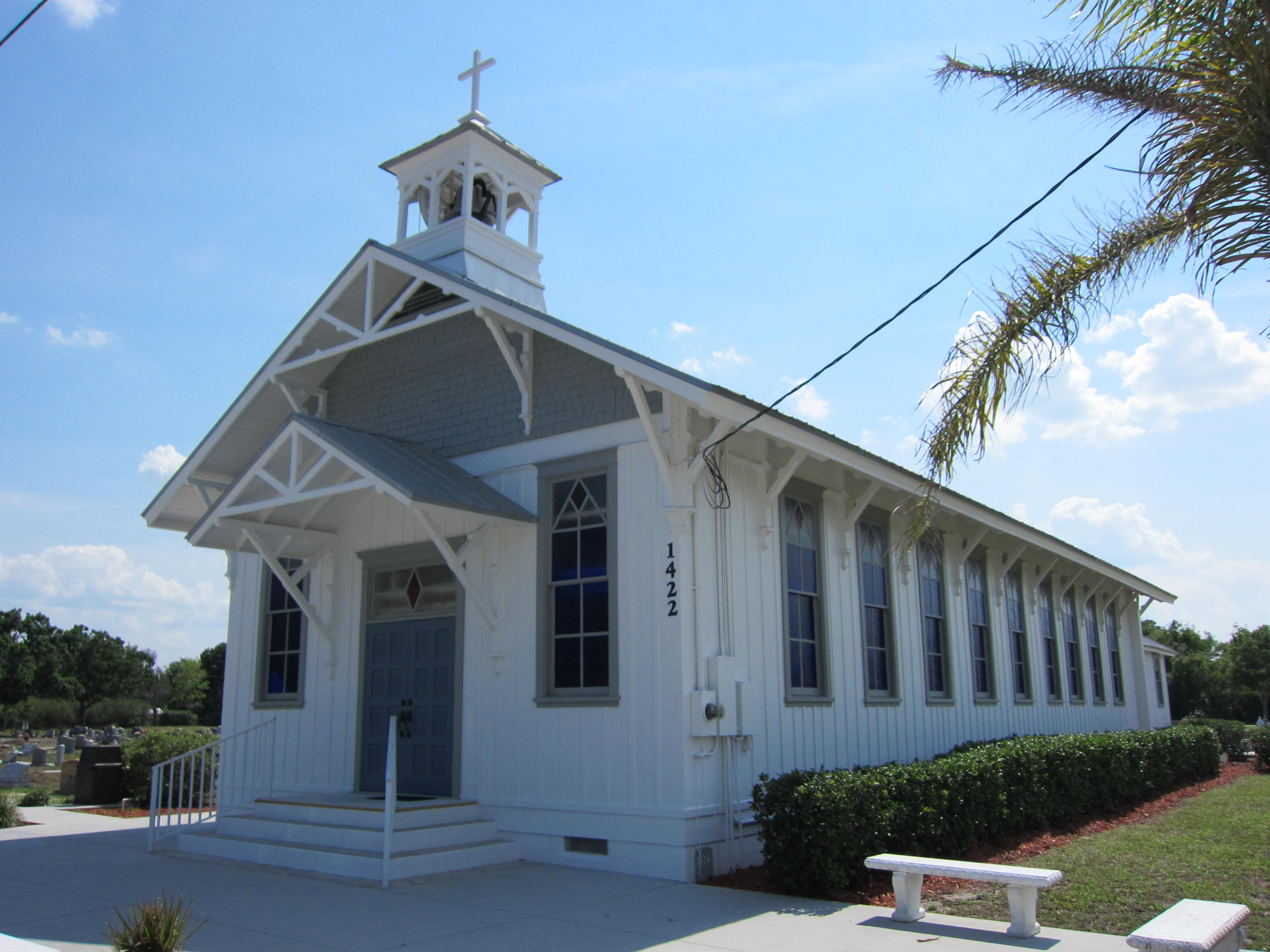

- Location within Florida Location within the United States
- Location: 1422 Northeast Miller Street; Palm Bay, Florida
- Coordinates: 28°2′0″N 80°35′12″W
- Architectural style: Stick-Eastlake
- NRHP reference No.: 87000816
- Added to NRHP: December 3, 1987

St. Joseph's Catholic Church, also known as St. Joseph Miller Street Catholic Church, is a historic wooden Roman Catholic church located at 1422 Northeast Miller Street in Palm Bay, Florida, United States.

== Description ==
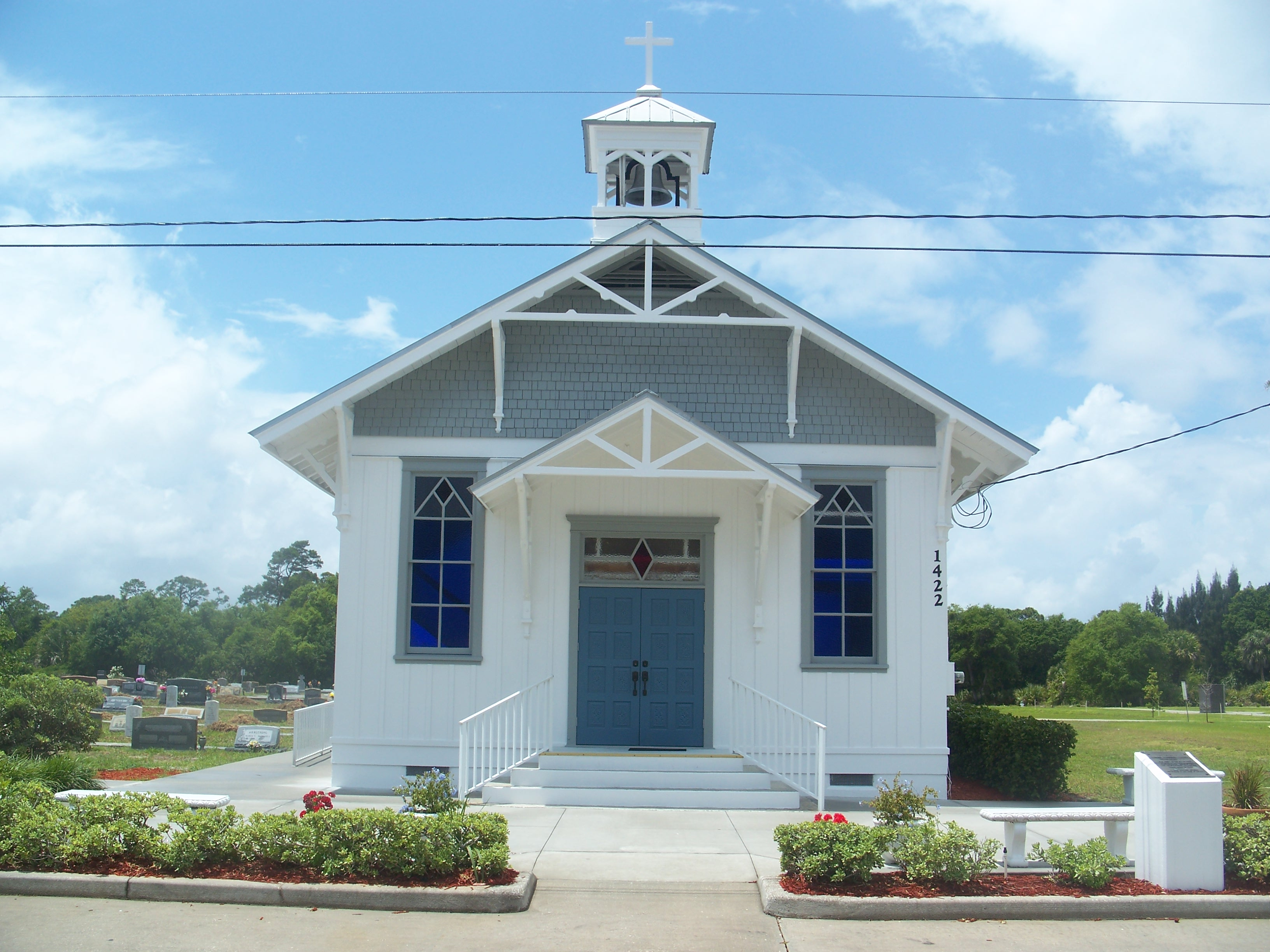
St. Joseph Miller Street Catholic Church and Cemetery

Adjacent to the church is historic Saint Joseph Catholic Cemetery.

On December 3, 1987, the church building was added to the U.S. National Register of Historic Places.

Saint Joseph Catholic Community is still an active parish in Palm Bay. Its main church building is located at 5530 Babcock Street, Northeast. The Miller Street Church continues in use the chapel for the cemetery, which is still active.

== References and external links ==
- Brevard County listings at National Register of Historic Places
- Florida's Office of Cultural and Historical Programs
  - Brevard County listings
  - St. Joseph's Catholic Church
