= Alexander Hamilton Jr./Sr. High School =

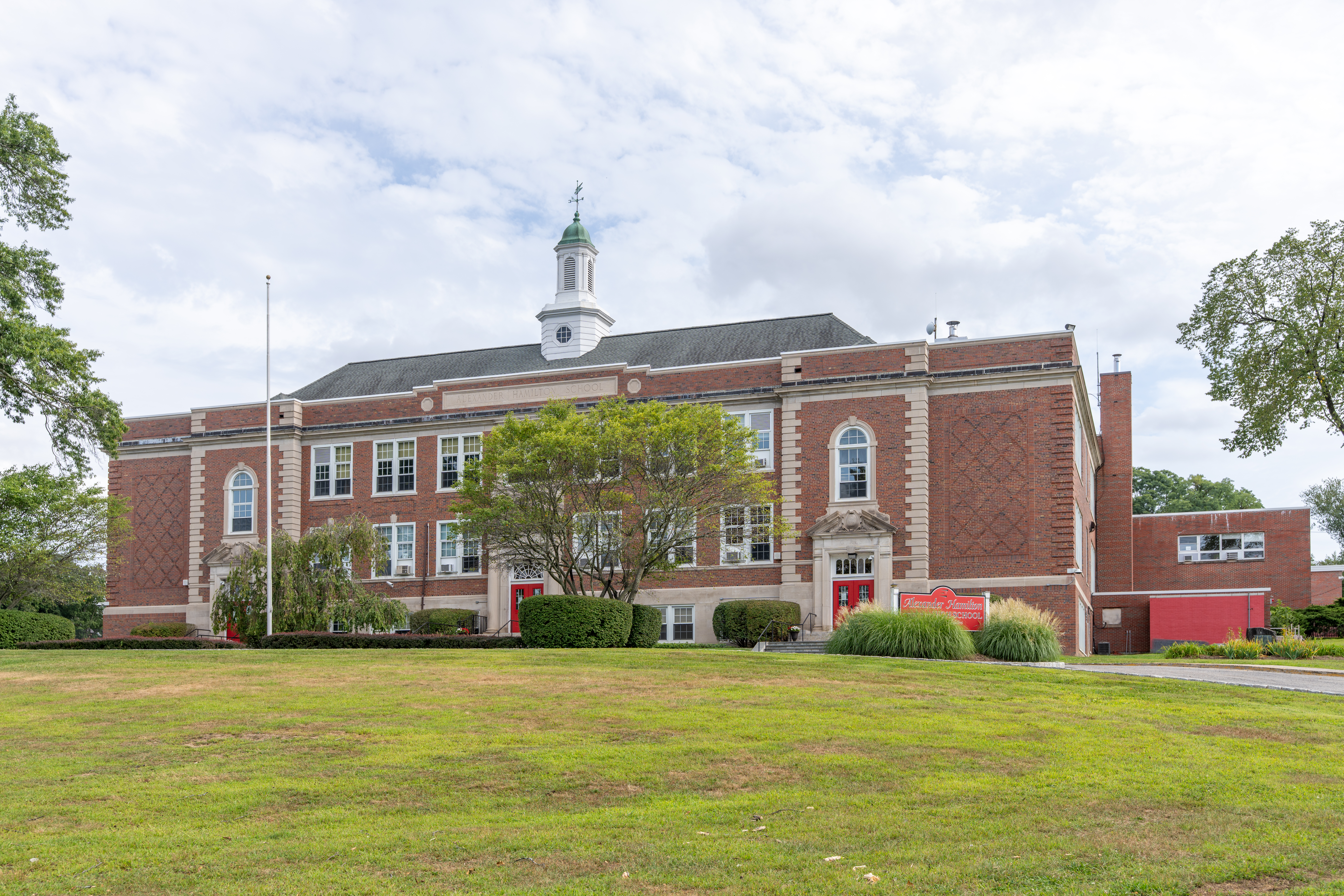
- Alexander Hamilton Jr./Sr. High School

Location
- 98 South Goodwin Avenue; Elmsford, New York; Elmsford, (Westchester County), New York 10523; United States; 41°02′58.35″N 73°49′01.47″W

Information
- Type: Public
- Established: 1929
- School district: Elmsford Union Free School District
- Superintendent: Ronald Gonzalez
- Principal: Jeffery Capuano
- Staff: 37.21 (FTE)
- Grades: 7–12
- Student to teacher ratio: 12.31
- Colors: Red, black, and white
- Athletics conference: NY Section 1, Class "C"
- Mascot: The Red Raider
- Team name: The Red Raiders
- Accreditation: Middle States Association of Colleges and Schools
- Newspaper: The Raider Reporter
- Yearbook: The Statesman
- Website: ahhs.eufsd.org

Alexander Hamilton Jr./Sr. High School (AHHS) is a public, six-year middle and secondary school in Elmsford, New York, United States. It is the only public junior and senior high school in the Elmsford School District.

== Demographics ==
The makeup of the school is 36% African American, 45% Hispanic or Latino, 11% White, and 9% Asian or Native Hawaiian/other Pacific Islander. 57 percent of the teachers have either a master's degree plus 30 credits or a doctoral degree.

== Honors and distinctions ==
In 1993 the school was selected as a United States Blue Ribbon School of Excellence, and in 1996 it was named one of the nation's 150 outstanding high schools by Redbook magazine.

== Extracurricular activities ==
The school has the following clubs:

- Academic Challenge
- Art Club
- Audio/Visual Club
- Band
- Chess Club
- Chorus
- The Hamilton Players theatre company
- Key Club
- Literary magazine
- Marching band
- Mock trial team
- National Honor Society
- Princeton Model Congress
- The Raider Reporter (school newspaper)
- Raiders Against Destructive Decisions (RADD)
- Science Olympiad
- The Statesman (school yearbook)
- Student Government
- Varsity Athletes Against Substance Abuse (VAASA)
- Vocal Club

== Athletics ==
Alexander Hamilton competes in Section 1 (NYSPHSAA) of the New York State Public High School Athletic Association.

Sport	Level	Season	Gender
Cross-Country	V	Fall	Co-ed
Soccer	V, JV, Mod	Fall	Boys', girls'
Volleyball	V, JV, Mod	Fall	Girls'
Bowling	V	Winter	Boys', girls'
Track and field	V	Winter	Co-ed
Basketball	V, JV, M	Winter	Boys', girls'
	V	Spring	Co-ed
Baseball	V, M	Spring	Boys'
Softball	JV, M	Spring	Girls'

V = Varsity, JV = Junior varsity, Mod = Modified
