= The Ursuline School =

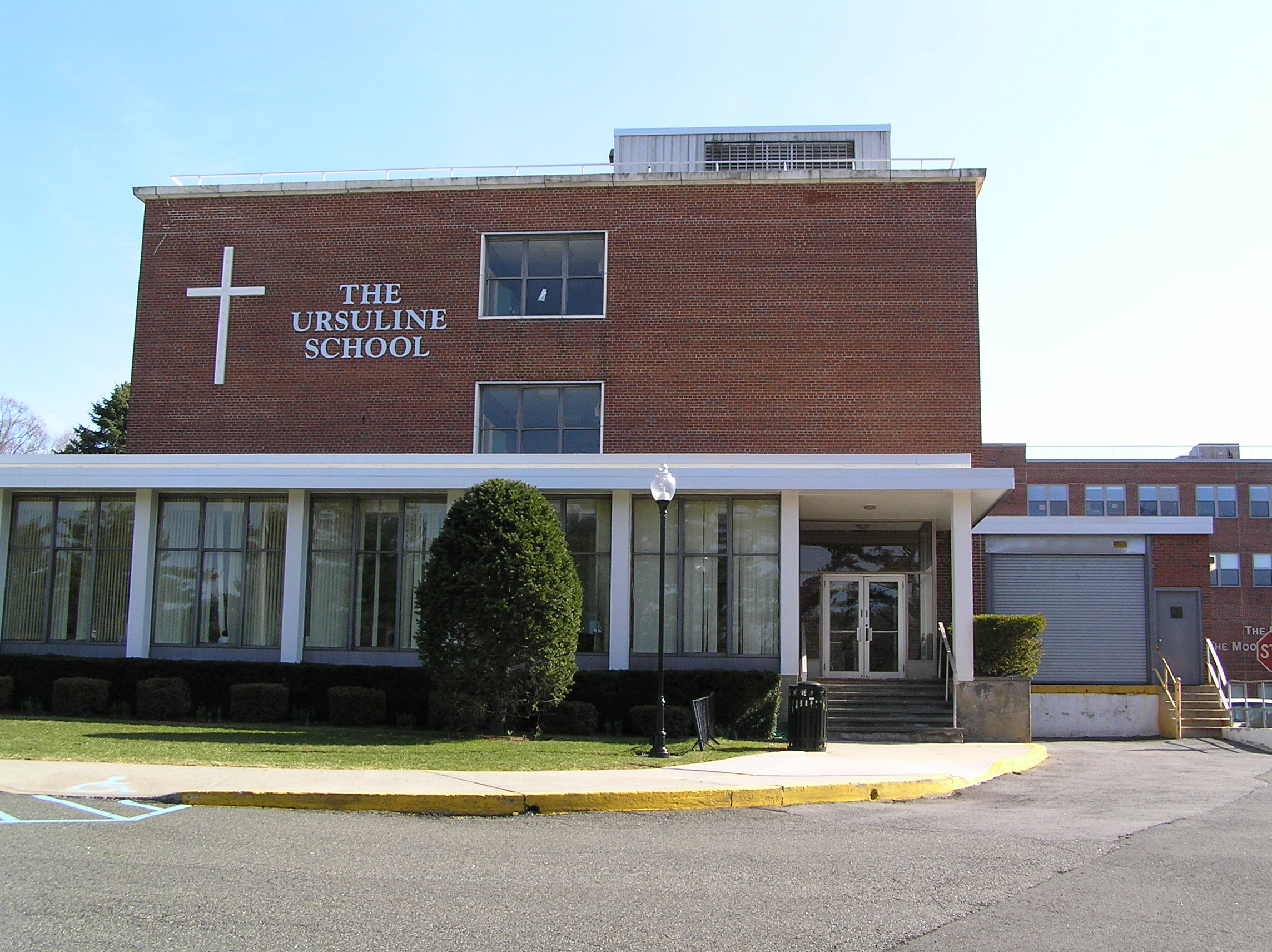

Location
- 1354 North Avenue; New Rochelle, (Westchester County), New York 10804; United States; 40°56′53.5″N 73°47′51″W

Information
- Former name: Ursuline Seminary for Girls
- Type: Private, all-female
- Motto: Serviam ("I will serve")
- Religious affiliation: Roman Catholic
- Established: 1897 (129 years ago)
- Founder: Ursuline Sisters
- School code: 21
- Principal: Robyn Summa (Interim)
- Faculty: 82
- Grades: 6–12
- Campus size: 13-acre (53,000 m^{2})
- Campus type: Suburban
- Colors: Blue and white
- Athletics: Member, New York State Public High School Athletic Association; fields 33 interscholastic teams
- Mascot: Koala
- Nickname: TUS
- Team name: Koalas
- Accreditation: New York State Association of Independent Schools
- Publication: Pegasus (literary magazine)
- Newspaper: Unison
- Yearbook: Eidolon
- Tuition: $22,650
- Website: ursulinenewrochelle.org

The Ursuline School is an American all-girls', independent, private, Roman Catholic middle and high school located on a 13-acre (53,000 m^{2}) campus in New Rochelle, New York, in Westchester County.

The school was founded in 1897 by the Order of St. Ursula. The school is part of a network of 15 Ursuline schools in North America and many around the world.

The school has approximately 800 students, grades 6 through 12, that come from throughout the metropolitan area, including the Bronx, Westchester County, Rockland County, Manhattan and Connecticut.

Ursuline's brother school is Iona Preparatory School, also located in New Rochelle.

== History ==
The school began as the Ursuline Seminary for Girls in September 1897, operating out of Leland Castle at the now-closed College of New Rochelle. As registration increased, a wing was added to the southern end of the castle and the College of New Rochelle was founded.

By 1929, The Ursuline School, then a kindergarten through twelfth grade day school, moved to its present location at 1354 North Avenue. The North Building was added in 1960, the gym in 1981, the Chapel of St. Angela in 1986, The Mooney Hancock Arts Center in 2002 and the Lobby and Welcome Center in 2021.

== Academics ==
Students must complete 24 specified credits in order to graduate, including four years of English, social studies, and religion; three years of science, mathematics, and a foreign language; a year of Latin or art/music; and a semester of computer applications and health. Physical education is also a requirement. More than 90 percent of students take four or more years of science, math, and a foreign language.

The traditional college-preparatory program includes three modern foreign languages (French, Spanish, and Italian), five years of Latin, a year of classical Greek, a broad range of fine arts courses, computer courses, and a variety of electives.

Honors courses are available in all disciplines, and Advanced Placement courses are offered in art, Spanish, Latin, Italian, English, calculus, biology, environmental science, physics, and European, U.S. history and U.S. government.

The school also offers an Authentic Science Research program through which, in addition to their regular science courses, students engage in three years of directed independent study. Seventh- and eighth-grade students have the opportunity to earn high school credit in a foreign language, mathematics, and science.

=== Clubs and organizations ===
Leadership, service and spiritual:

- Animal Rights Club
- Breast Cancer Awareness
- Cantors
- Doctors without Borders
- Heart Club
- STEMinist club
- Key Club
- National Art Society
- National Honors Society
- National Junior Honors Society
- National Italian Honors Society
- O Ambassadors
- Operation Smile
- SADD
- Social Action
- Teen Angels
- Tutorial

Co-curricular clubs:

- Art and Photography
- Book Club
- Physics Club
- Environmental Club
- Forensics and Speech Teams
- Math Club
- Model UN
- Poetry Club
- Let's Talk Politics! Club
- Diversity Alliance
- Koalas Who Code

Other activities:

- Women for Women International

Publications:

- Eidelon (yearbook)
- Pegasus (literary magazine)
- Unison (newspaper)
- TUS Webs (student-run "eMagazine")

Language and culture clubs:

- Asian Society
- French Club
- Gaelic Society
- Italian Club
- Japanese Anime Club
- Latin Club
- Linguistics/NACLO Club
- Spanish Circle

Performance:

- Choral
- Student-Run Charity Cabaret
- Dance Club
- Band
- Orchestra
- Choreographic Workshop
- Spectrum Club
- Stage Crew
- Tech Crew
- Drama

=== Accomplishments ===
- In 2007, 80 percent of the school's 133 Advanced Placement students who took 191 AP exams in June earned college qualifying scores of at least a 3. Over 50 percent earned the highest scores of 4 or 5.
- 16 members of the class of 2007 were named AP Scholars, 3 with Honor and 7 with Distinction. The awards are based on successful performance on Advanced Placement Exams, the number of exams taken and the grades earned on those tests. Scholars earned an average composite score of 3.79 (out of 5); the Scholars with Honor 3.92 (out of 5) and the Scholars with Distinction 4.49 (out of 5). The school AP grade average is 4.21 out of 5.

== Athletics ==
The school belongs to the New York State Public High School Athletic Association, with 30 interscholastic teams in swimming, tennis, field hockey, soccer, volleyball, cross-country, cheer leading, basketball, softball, lacrosse, golf, and indoor and outdoor track.

Athletic facilities include a full-size gymnasium, a multi-sport playing field, and three tennis courts. The swim team had been undefeated for eight years as of 2013.

Fall:

- tennis – varsity, junior varsity
- swimming
- crew
- cross country
- volleyball – varsity, junior varsity, 7th–8th
- field hockey – varsity, junior varsity
- cheerleading – varsity, junior varsity
- soccer – varsity, junior varsity

Winter:

- basketball – varsity A, varsity B, junior varsity, 9th, 7th–8th, 6th
- cheerleading – varsity, junior varsity
- crew
- indoor track and field

Spring:

- lacrosse – varsity, junior varsity, 7th–8th
- golf
- crew
- softball – varsity, junior varsity, 7th–8th, 6th/7th
- outdoor track and field

=== Accomplishments ===
- The varsity cheerleaders place first at the 2022 UCA National Cheerleading Competition
- The varsity cheerleaders placed second and junior varsity cheerleaders placed first at the 2020 UCA National Cheerleading Competition.
- In 2007, the golf team placed second in the league.
- Also in 2007; junior varsity tennis (10–0) and junior varsity soccer (13–0) finished on top of their leagues; varsity volleyball was undefeated in league play; the swim ream was undefeated in Division 1, the strongest league in the section, capturing their third consecutive Division Title; varsity cross country finished second in both league and county championships; junior varsity cross country won the county championships; freshmen cross country finished third in the county championships.

== Notable alumni ==
- Sonia Citron (2021), basketball player for the Notre Dame Fighting Irish
