= College of Westchester =

Private for-profit university in New York

The College of Westchester
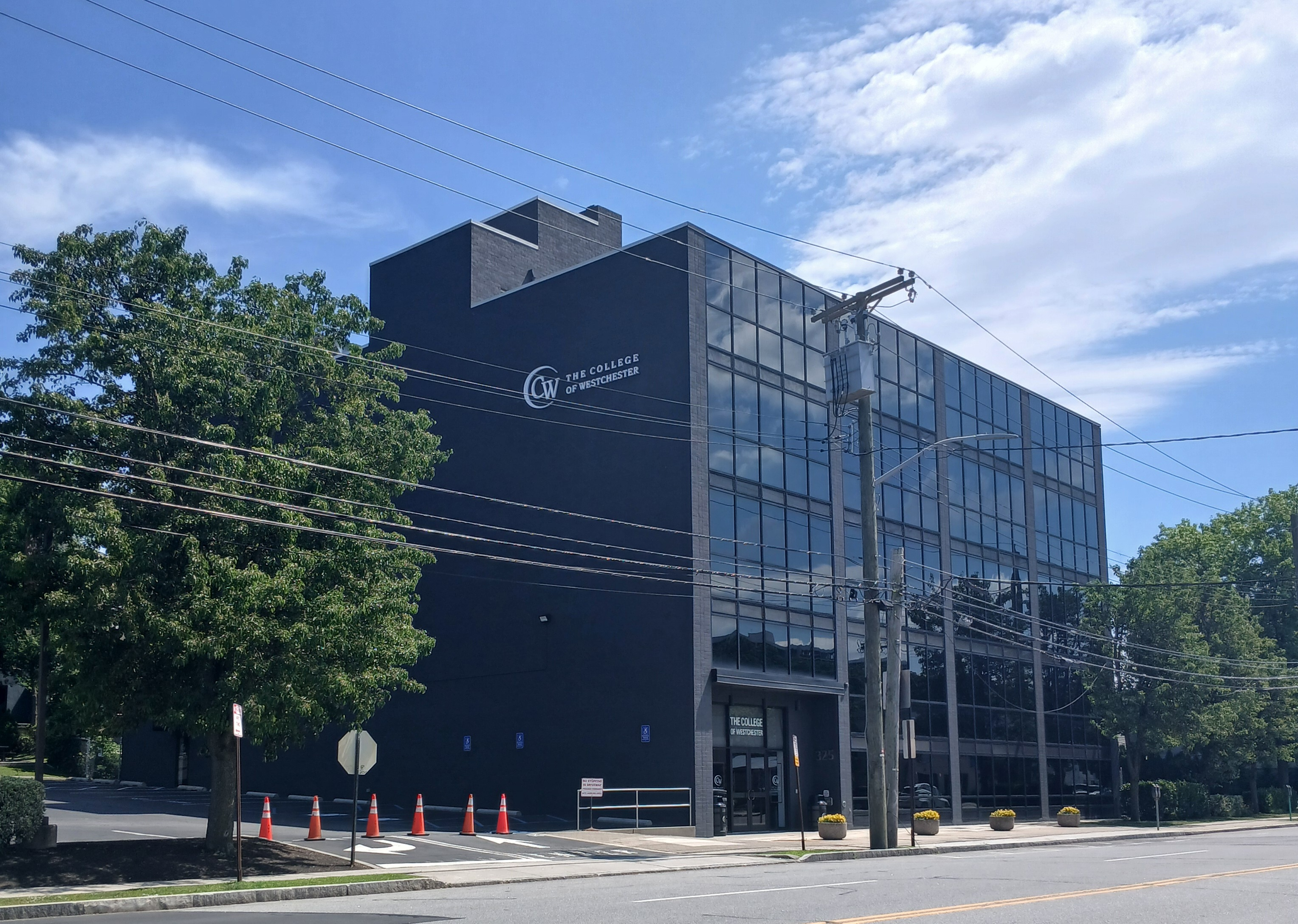
- Motto: Education That Works
- Type: For-profit university
- Established: 1915
- President: Karen J. Smith
- Academic staff: 18 FT/ 55 PT (2023)
- Students: 891
- Location: White Plains, New York, U.S. 41.0338°N 73.7846°W
- Campus: Suburban
- Colors: Maroon and Black
- Website: www.cw.edu

The College of Westchester (CW) is a private for-profit college in White Plains, New York.

== History ==
The College of Westchester (CW) was founded in 1915 in New Rochelle, New York as Westchester Commercial School. Its original focus was on business and secretarial studies, offering both day and evening classes.

The school expanded in 1959, and moved to White Plains, New York, first located at 16 Bank Street. In 1973, it changed its name to Westchester Business School and earned its first formal accreditation. In 1975, the New York State Board of Regents authorized the institution, by then known as The Westchester Business Institute, to offer the Associate in Occupational Studies degree.

In 1985, the college moved from Bank Street to its current location at 325 Central Avenue.

In 2003, the college changed its name to The College of Westchester and was granted accreditation by Middle States Commission on Higher Education, in March of that same year.

In 2008, the New York State Board of Regents authorized the college to award its first bachelor's degree, a Bachelor of Business Administration (BBA) in Management.
