= French-American School of New York =

Location
- HQ and Grades 9-12: 320 East Boston Post Road; Mamaroneck, NY 10543 Nursery-Grade 3: 111 Larchmont Avenue; Larchmont, NY 10538 Grades 4-8: 145 New Street; Mamaroneck, NY 10543

Information
- Type: Private, International, and bilingual school
- Opened: 1980
- Founders: Katherine Watkins and Sylvette Maschino
- Grades: Nursery-Grade 12
- Enrollment: 780 students
- Colors: Blue and white
- Team name: Sharks
- Website: fasny.org

The French-American School of New York (also known as the Lycée Franco-Américain de New York, or FASNY) is a bilingual independent school located in suburban Westchester County, New York. It was founded in 1980 and has more than 780 students. The school offers education from Nursery (three years old) to 12th grade at three campuses in Larchmont and Mamaroneck. FASNY is accredited by the New York State Association of Independent Schools, the International Baccalaureate Organization, and the French Ministry of Education. 69% of the students are of French origin, 21% are American, and 10% hail from countries in the francophone world.

== History ==
=== Early history ===
The French-American School of New York was founded in 1980 to provide a bilingual education to students. Located in the building of a former Catholic school in Larchmont, New York, the school employed two teachers and provided education at the nursery school, kindergarten, and first grade level, with the intent to add one grade per year as the time progressed. In November 1980, the then-nineteen-student school received a provisional charter from the New York State Regents. The school's original students included students of American, French, Canadian, Chinese, and Vietnamese descent.

Enrollment in the French-American School of New York expanded rapidly in its first several years. While the school started with sixteen students on its rolls, the school had enrolled twenty-six students by the end of its first academic year. The school expanded rapidly going into its second academic year, enrolling forty-nine students at it onset and adding a second grade classroom. By January 1982, the school had seventy students on its rolls and announced plans to add both a third and fourth grade classroom by the onset of its fourth academic year. By the end of its third academic year, the school had increased its enrollment to 128 students. The size of its student population further increased by the start of its fourth academic year to about 185 students.

== Controversy about Ridgeway Country Club ==
Purchasing Ridgeway Country Club's 129-acre campus in 2011, FASNY went on to plan construction on the property, which is located in White Plains.

== Campuses ==
- Manor (Nursery-Grade 3) – 111 Larchmont Avenue, Larchmont, NY
- Village (Grades 4–8) – 145 New Street, Mamaroneck, NY
- Harbor (Grades 9–12 and Administrative Offices) – 320 East Boston Post Road, Mamaroneck, NY
