= Irvington Union Free School District =

School district in the U.S. state of New York

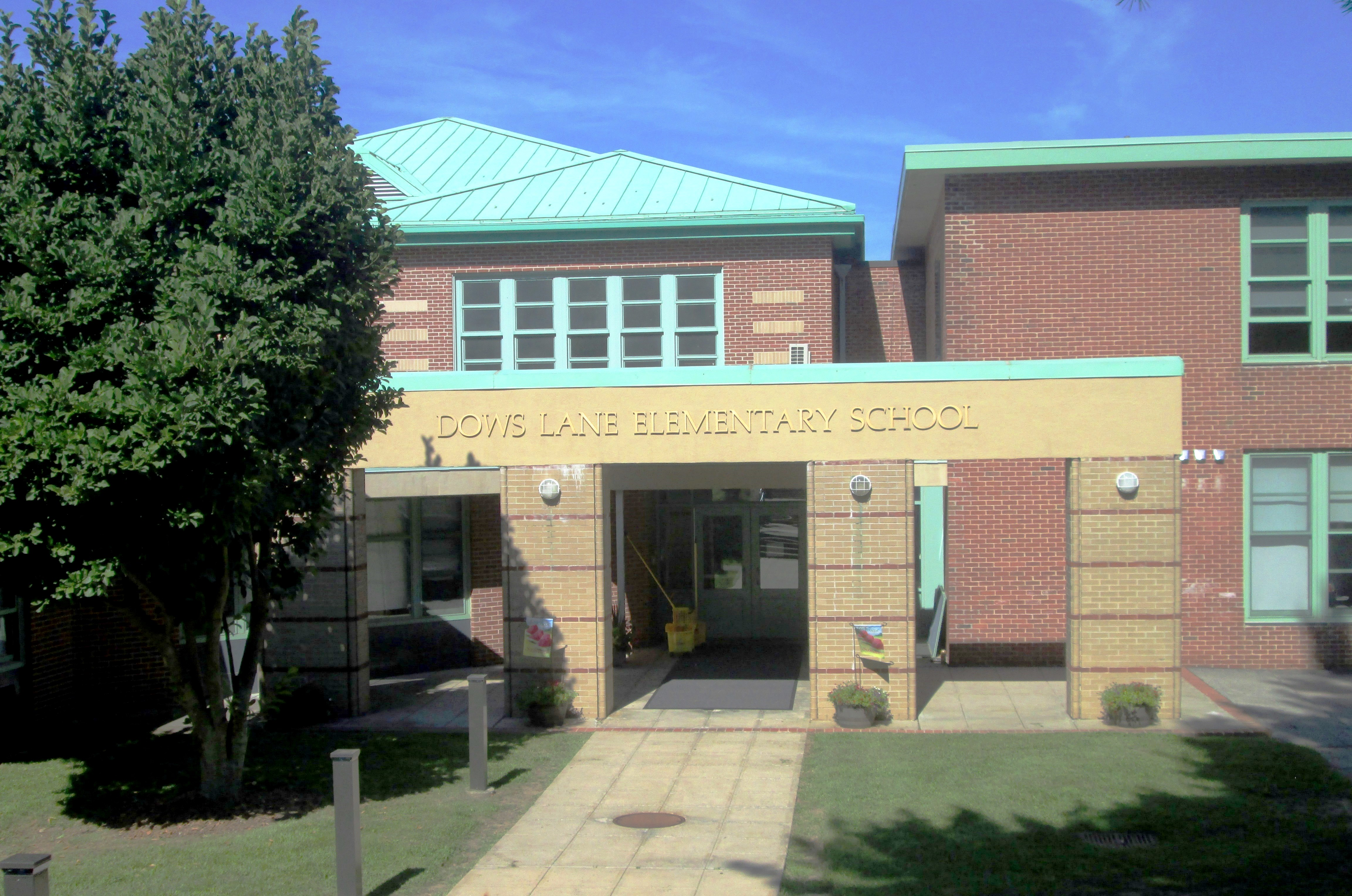
- east entrance to Dows Lane Elementary School (2016)

Location
- 6 Dows Lane; Irvington, New York 10533

District information
- Superintendent: Dr. Kristopher Harrison

Students and staff
- Students: 1,779
- Faculty: 209

Other information
- Website: https://www.irvingtonschools.org/

Irvington Union Free School District is a school district encompassing Irvington, New York and some surrounding neighborhoods. The district also includes East Irvington, an unincorporated area of the Town of Greenburgh, and the Pennybridge section of Tarrytown, Irvington's northern neighbor.

The schools are Dows Lane Elementary School (K-3); the Main Street School (4&5), which at one time was a K-12 school, then the district's high school, and later the middle school; Irvington Middle School (6-8); and Irvington High School (9-12). The Middle School and High School are sited together on a combined campus on Heritage Hill Road off of North Broadway, on the site where the Stern castle, "Greystone", once stood. Stern purchased the property from Augustus C. Richards in the late nineteenth century.

== History ==
The district originally had three schools, the Main Street School, which accommodated all students in the area of the village of Irvington; and the Pennybridge School and East Irvington Schools, which took in students from their areas until they reached high school age. After the Dows Lane School was built, the two outlying schools were eventually closed down, and the Main Street School became the district's high school. Overcrowding was a problem, and when Greystone burned down, a new high school, accommodating students from grade 7 to 12, was built on the grounds around 1966. The Main Street School then became a middle school for grades 5 and 6. Shortly, the new high school proved to be less space then needed, and a temporary pre-fabricated unit, called "the Annex", was sited on the grounds south of the high school, This was used primarily for junior high school students (grades 7 and 8). Many decades later, the high school's activities building was torn down and replaced and additional space was added for academics – the original high school building was retained. As part of this overall project, a new middle school was built to the east of the high school.

== Students and ratings ==
The school system – the student population of which was around 1,900 in 2013 and 1,775 in 2018 – is known for its small class size and emphasis on academics; and about 98% of graduates go on to higher education. In 2012, the average SAT scores were 571 (reading), 583 (math) and 573 (writing), compared to the statewide averages of 496. 514 and 488, and 74.7 percent of fourth grade students met state standards in English, and 66.1 percent in math, compared to statewide averages of 30.3 and 36.3 percent. In 2017, 74% of the school system's fourth graders met state-wide English standards, and 80% met the standards for math, as opposed to 41% and 43% for the state as a whole. In the high school, the mean SAT scores were 619 for "evidence-based reading and writing" and 625 in math, compared to 523 and 528 for the state.

In 2015, U.S. News & World Report rated Irvington High School as number 32 in New York State, making it the ninth-best in Westchester, while the next year it was ranked as #198 in the United States, and #35 in New York, with a college readiness index of 70.3, and a student-teacher ratio of 12:1. In 2016, Niche.com, a rating and ranking website, listed Irvington High School as the #83 high school in New York, and #595 in the country. The next year, in 2017, U.S.News ranked the high school as #45 in New York state, and #377 in the country, which won it a gold medal for being in the top 500 nationally.

In June 2016, Niche rated the Irvington school district as #42 in New York State. In October of that year, Niche also listed Irvington as New York State's #16 best school district to teach in. In January 2017, Niche rated the Irvington school system as #29 among all the public school systems in New York state.

The Irvington School system was voted "Best of" Westchester Public Schools in 2016, 2017, and 2018 by readers of Westchester Magazine.

== Controversy ==
In 2019, it came to light that the school district's Director of Technology, Jesse Lubinsky, was paid by the district to attend seminars to earn credits to maintain his state teaching license, but that Lubinsky actually taught many of those seminars in his position as a contractor for EdTechTeam, a Google contractor. Further, Lubinsky was paid a higher rate for this work by the district than other teachers receive, or than is required by union contract. Investigation showed that the district's chief administrator accommodated Lubinsky's "double-dipping", and that Lubinsky's rise through the district's bureaucracy was rapid, having started in 2005 as a teacher, and becoming a Tech Coordinator in 2006, the Tech Coach and Chief Information Officer in 2009, a Program Chair in 2013, and an Administrator in 2017. He started working with EdTechTeam in 2014. When Lubinsky became an Administrator, the school district's spending on Google products increased from $43,000 in 2016-2017 to $129,000 in 2017-2018. Lubinsky has resigned.

Lubinsky denied all of the claims and, subsequently, filed two separate defamation suits. The first was against Della Marie Lenz, an Irvington UFSD parent who spearheaded the effort to make the allegations against Lubinsky public through the press and who allegedly targeted Lubinsky for failing to provide a district contract for her husband’s technology company, OLAFE Incorporated. Lenz filed counterclaims and a motion to dismiss against Lubinsky. The counterclaims were dismissed and the motion to dismiss was partially denied. The case is currently pending trial.

The second suit was filed against David McKay Wilson, the Journal News reporter who published articles on the issue, as well as the newspaper’s publisher, Gannett Incorporated. The reporter and publisher also filed a motion to dismiss which was partially denied. In the decision, the judge noted that “Defendant Wilson's statements that Plaintiff was ineligible to receive payments in the summer of 2017, that Plaintiff had his administrative appointment moved so he could get paid as a teacher in the summer of 2017, stating there was a discrepancy in the vacation days charged to Plaintiff for days he worked for EdTech, and that EdTech paid Lubinsky's travel expenses for the EDU Think Tank, which was part of school business, are refuted by the documentary evidence submitted in support of the present motion,” that “the response by IUFSD to Defendant Wilson's FOIL request, rather than establishing the truth of the statements regarding Plaintiff's ineligibility to receive payment over the summer of 2017, establishes the falsity of the statements.” and that “the statements were made, at a minimum, with reckless disregard of whether the statements were false.“ The defendants have appealed and the case is currently before the Second Department.
