= East Hanover School District =

School district in Morris County, New Jersey, US

Address
- 20 School Avenue East Hanover Township, Morris County, New Jersey, 07936; United States
- Coordinates: 40.826507°N 74.356985°W

District information
- Grades: Pre-K to 8
- Superintendent: Natalee Bartlett
- Business administrator: Carol Delsandro
- Schools: 3

Students and staff
- Enrollment: 1,003 (as of 2023–24)
- Faculty: 106.0 FTEs
- Student–teacher ratio: 9.5:1

Other information
- District Factor Group: GH
- Website: www.easthanoverschools.org
Ind.	Per pupil	District spending	Rank (*)	K-8 average	%± vs. average
1A	Total Spending	$18,877	70	$18,891	−0.1%
1	Budgetary Cost	15,187	66	14,159	7.3%
2	Classroom Instruction	9,539	72	8,659	10.2%
6	Support Services	1,967	36	2,167	−9.2%
8	Administrative Cost	1,898	76	1,547	22.7%
10	Operations & Maintenance	1,622	51	1,612	0.6%
13	Extracurricular Activities	118	63	104	13.5%
16	Median Teacher Salary	66,315	73	61,136
Data from NJDoE 2014 Taxpayers' Guide to Education Spending. *Of K-8 districts with more than 750 students. Lowest spending=1; Highest=84

The East Hanover School District is a community public school district that serves students in pre-kindergarten through eighth grade from East Hanover Township, in Morris County, in the U.S. state of New Jersey.

As of the 2023–24 school year, the district, comprised of three schools, had an enrollment of 1,003 students and 106.0 classroom teachers (on an FTE basis), for a student–teacher ratio of 9.5:1.

In 2020, the district was classified as a high performing school according to the State Department of Education's NJQSAC monitoring process.

The district had been classified by the New Jersey Department of Education as being in District Factor Group "GH", the third-highest of eight groupings. District Factor Groups organize districts statewide to allow comparison by common socioeconomic characteristics of the local districts. From lowest socioeconomic status to highest, the categories are A, B, CD, DE, FG, GH, I and J.

Students in ninth through twelfth grades for public school are served by the Hanover Park Regional High School District, attending Hanover Park High School in East Hanover, together with students from Florham Park. The district also serves students from the neighboring community of Hanover Township at Whippany Park High School in the Whippany section of Hanover Township. As of the 2023–24 school year, the high school had an enrollment of 713 students and 72.3 classroom teachers (on an FTE basis), for a student–teacher ratio of 9.9:1.

== Schools ==
The schools in the district (with 2023–24 enrollment data from the National Center for Education Statistics) are:

Elementary schools

- Frank J. Smith Elementary School with 328 students in grades PreK–2
  - Matthew Tuorto, principal
- Central Elementary School with 347 students in grades 3–5
  - Melissa V. Falcone, principal

Middle school

- East Hanover Middle School with 319 students in grades 6–8
  - Stacie Costello, principal

== Administration ==
Core members of the district's administration are:

- Natalee Bartlett, superintendent
- Carol Delsandro, business administrator and board secretary

== Board of education ==
The district's board of education, comprised of seven members, sets policy and oversees the fiscal and educational operation of the district through its administration. As a Type II school district, the board's trustees are elected directly by voters to serve three-year terms of office on a staggered basis, with either two or three seats up for election each year held (since 2012) as part of the November general election. The board appoints a superintendent to oversee the district's day-to-day operations and a business administrator to supervise the business functions of the district.
