= Temple Building (Rochester, New York) =

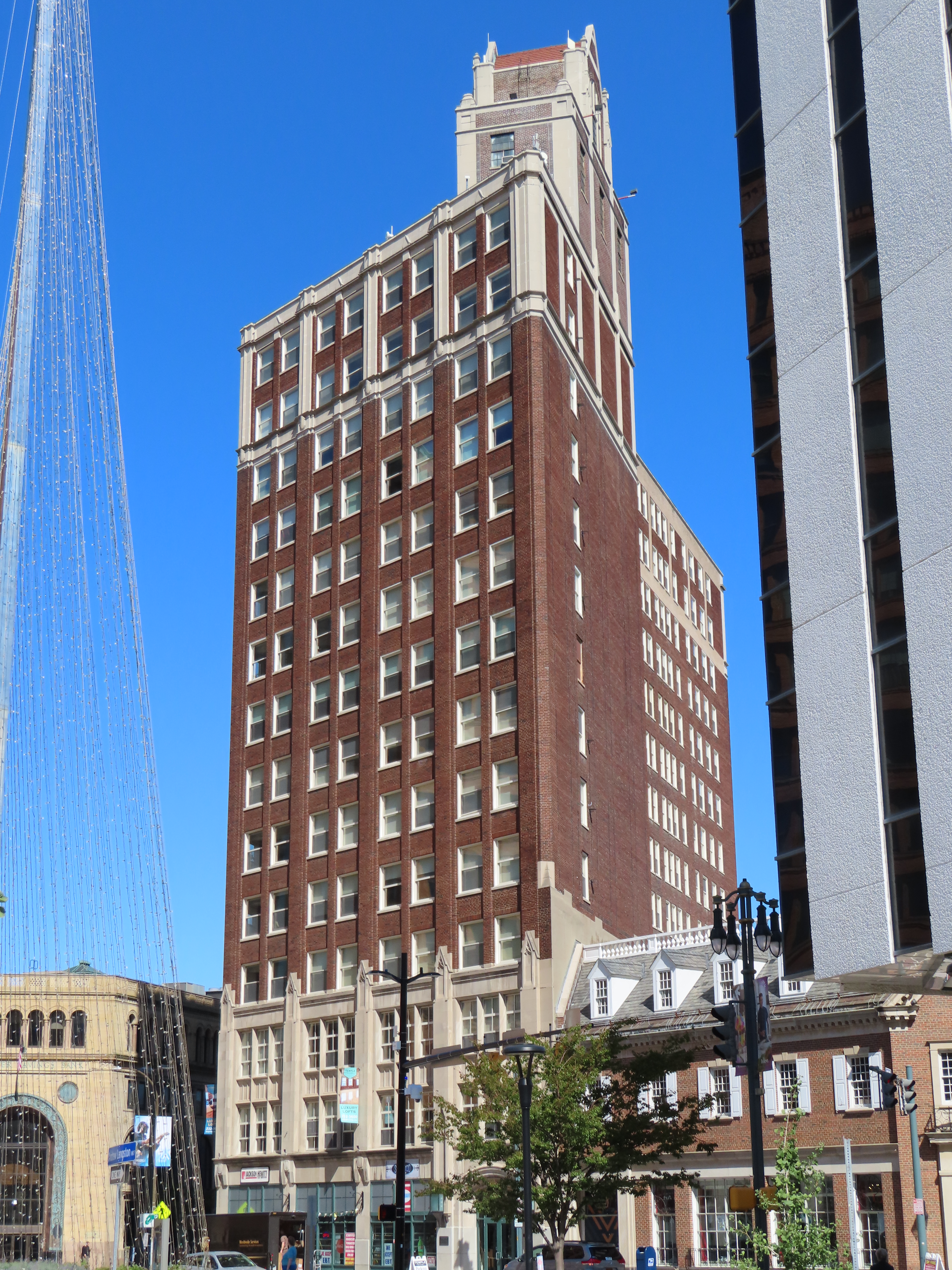
- Interactive map of the Temple Building area

General information
- Status: Completed
- Type: Commercial office space loft apartments
- Location: 14 Franklin Street; Rochester, New York, U.S.
- Coordinates: 43.1583°N 77.6045°W
- Completed: 1925
- Opening: September 7, 1925

Height
- Top floor: 218 feet (66 m)

Technical details
- Floor count: 14

Design and construction
- Architects: Carl Traver; Gordon & Kaelber Architects

Website
- www.templebuilding.com

The Temple Building is a high-rise building located in Rochester, New York, United States. Standing at 218 feet (66 m), it is the eleventh-tallest building in Rochester. In the early 1920's, Reverend Clinton Wunder, Pastor of the Second Baptist Church of Rochester, NY, convinced his congregation to build the Temple Building. The parish had outgrown their existing church. Wunder thought that a nine-story building would become an economic engine for the Church's mission. Eventually the plans changed to a fourteen-story building. Many in the congregation thought that it was unwise to build a fourteen-story "Skyscraper Church."

Wunder prevailed and a building committee, headed by William Hartman, was established. Originally the committee decided to build a hotel with the new church. They changed direction and decided an office building instead of a hotel would be better suited for the needs of the church and also more profitable. Hartman died suddenly in July 1923, but not before every penny of the estimated $1,900,000 needed for construction had been raised to build the Temple Building. The existing church was quickly demolished, and construction began in 1924. Until the Temple Building was complete, the congregation would temporarily worship in the old Lyceum Theater. Arthur Castle, the new chairman of the building committee was determined to finish construction within one year, and very nearly succeeded. Despite many trying circumstances, the new Temple Building was dedicated on September 7, 1925.

During the early years of its use, the building’s auditorium was frequently filled to capacity, and it was not uncommon to turn folks away. Wunder had strong oratorical skills and unusual advertising and promotional abilities to promote the Temple Building. Each year more than 100,000 people would walk through the Temple doors to attend worship services or an occasional debate. In 1926, Wunder invited Clarence Darrow to Rochester for a debate at the Temple Building with him on the topic "Has Life A Purpose?" Darrow's argument was based on his bold agnostic theories. The Church prospered and the Temple Building became one of Rochester's most famous landmark destinations.

== Baptist Temple ==
The Second Baptist Church of Rochester was started March 17, 1834 and formally organized Sept. 26, 1836. It was originally located at the northeast corner of and Clinton Avenue. It moved to North Street and Franklin Street by 1870.

In 1917, Park Avenue Baptist Church of Rochester merged with Second Baptist, calling the new merged church East Avenue Baptist, as they planned on building a church on East Avenue and Goodman St. In 1921 this plan was abandoned and the church voted to change its name to the Baptist Temple.

In 1922 the Baptist Temple announced plans on building a new church and office building at North and Franklin.

in 1924 the cornerstone of new church was laid and a copper box with historic documents laid inside. The new Baptist Temple Church inside the Temple Building was dedicated September 27, 1925.

In 1961, The Baptist Temple sold the church and office building to Milton Berger and Milton Karz for $1.6 Million (USD), with the Baptist retaining use of the sanctuary for an additional three years while they worked on relocating. In 1962 the Baptist Temple Church announced plans to move to a new location in Brighton, New York at Clover Street and Highland Avenue. Ground was broken for the new church in December 1963 and the new church opened in 1965.

== See also ==
- List of tallest buildings in Rochester, New York
