= List of tallest buildings in Upstate New York =

Upstate New York, broadly defined as part of New York north of New York City and Westchester County, which immediately borders New York City, is home to several skyscrapers and high-rises. The tallest building in New York State is the 104-story One World Trade Center, which was completed in 2014 and rises to 1,776 feet (541 m) in Lower Manhattan, New York City. New York City, the largest city in the United States, is home to the vast majority of the skyscrapers in New York; outside the city, most of the state's skyscrapers are concentrated in Albany, Buffalo and Rochester. The tallest building in Upstate New York is the 44-story Erastus Corning Tower, which rises 589 feet (180 m) in Albany, the state's capital city. Although the building is the tallest in the upstate region by a significant margin, it does not appear in the 100-tallest buildings in New York state when New York City skyscrapers are included in the ranking.

== Tallest buildings ==
Was the tallest building in Upstate New York upon completion

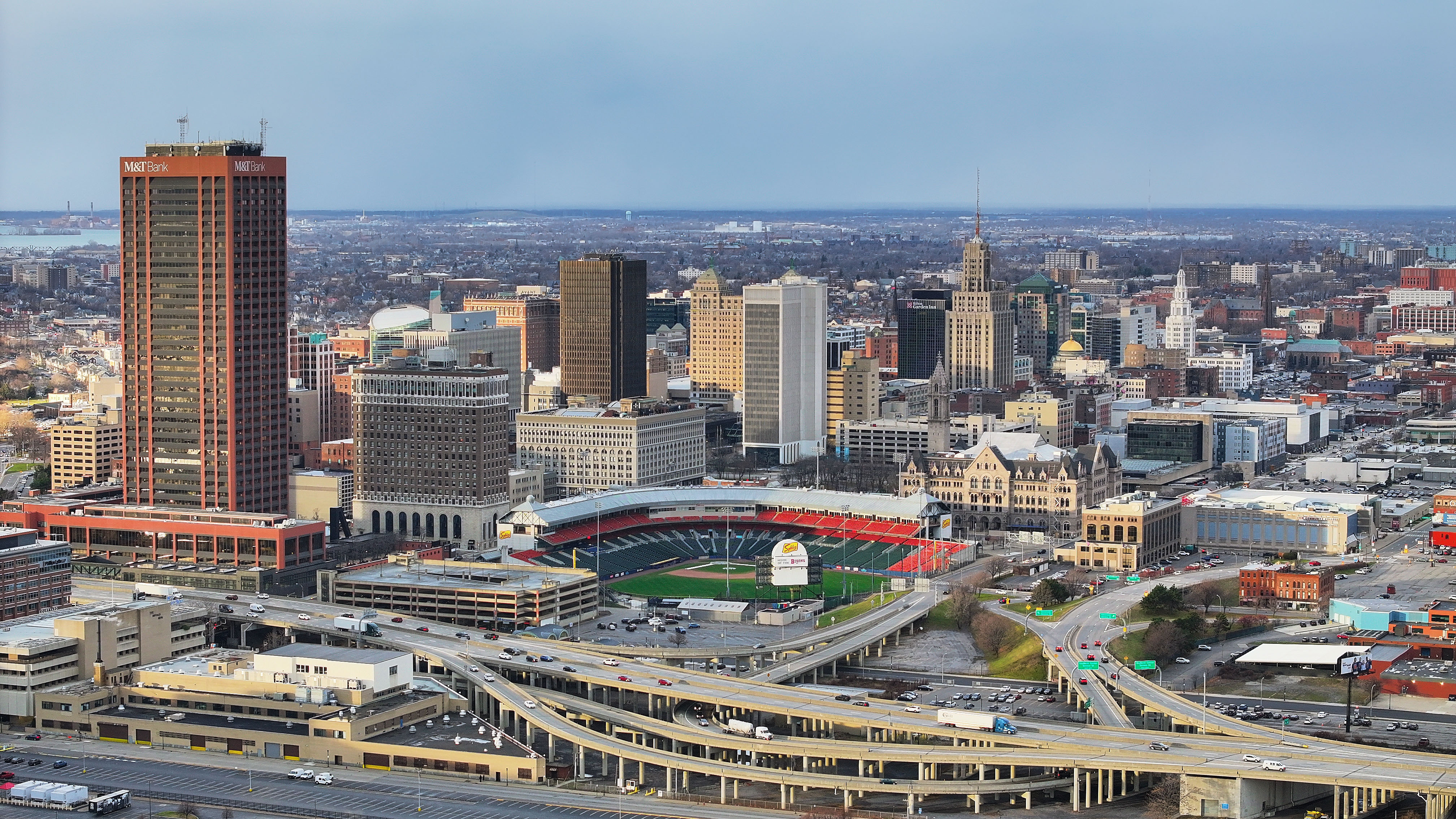
Skyline of Buffalo

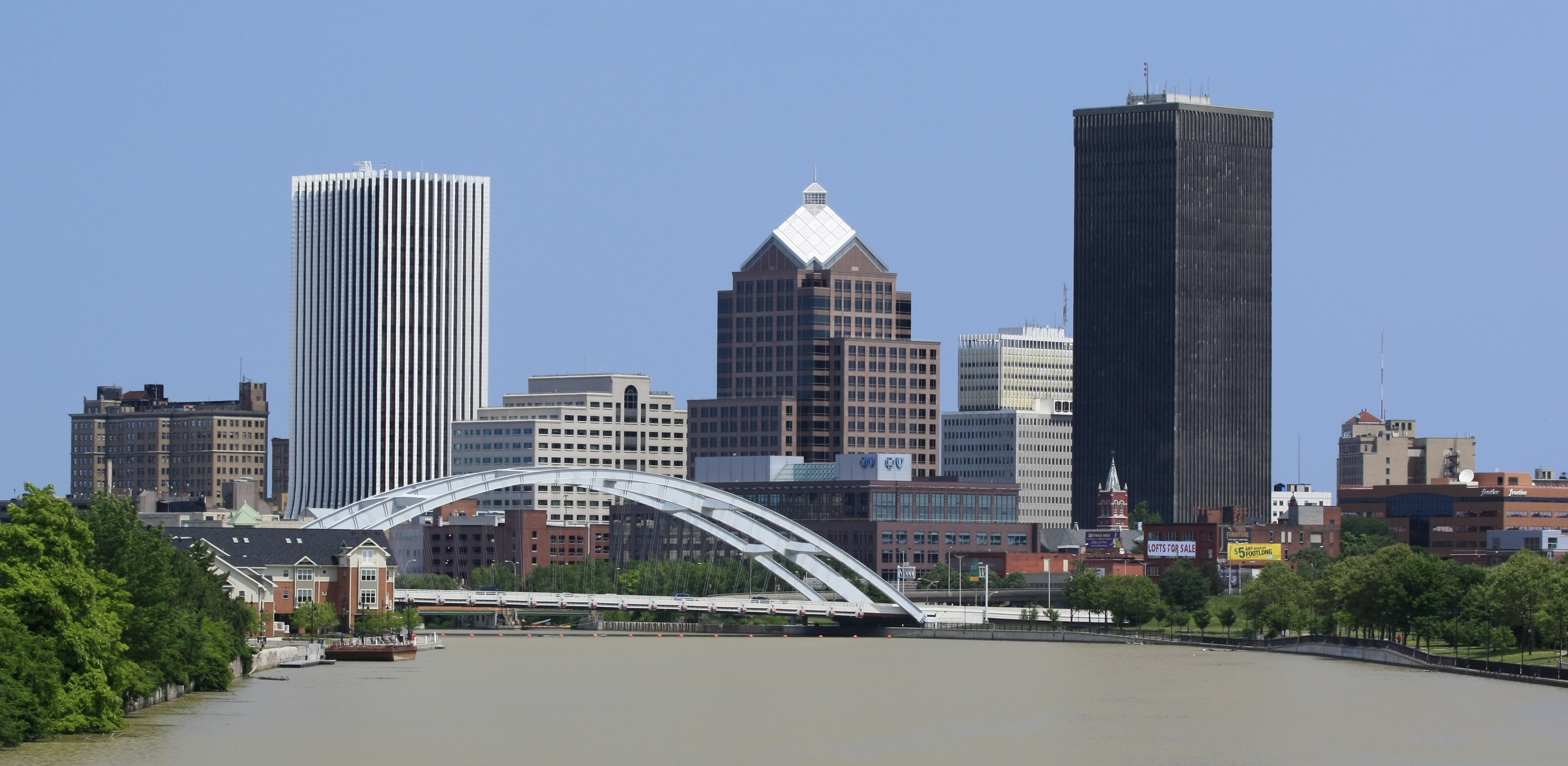
Skyline of Rochester

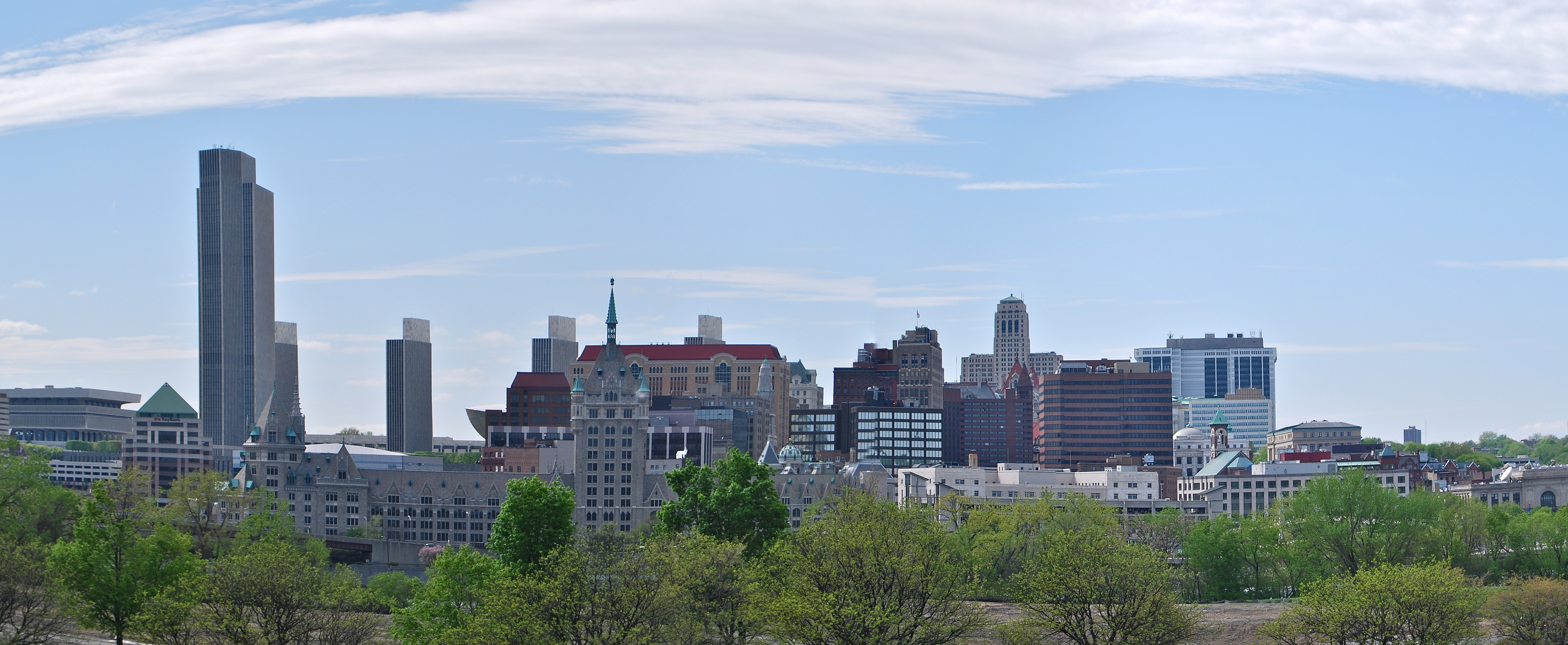
Skyline of Albany

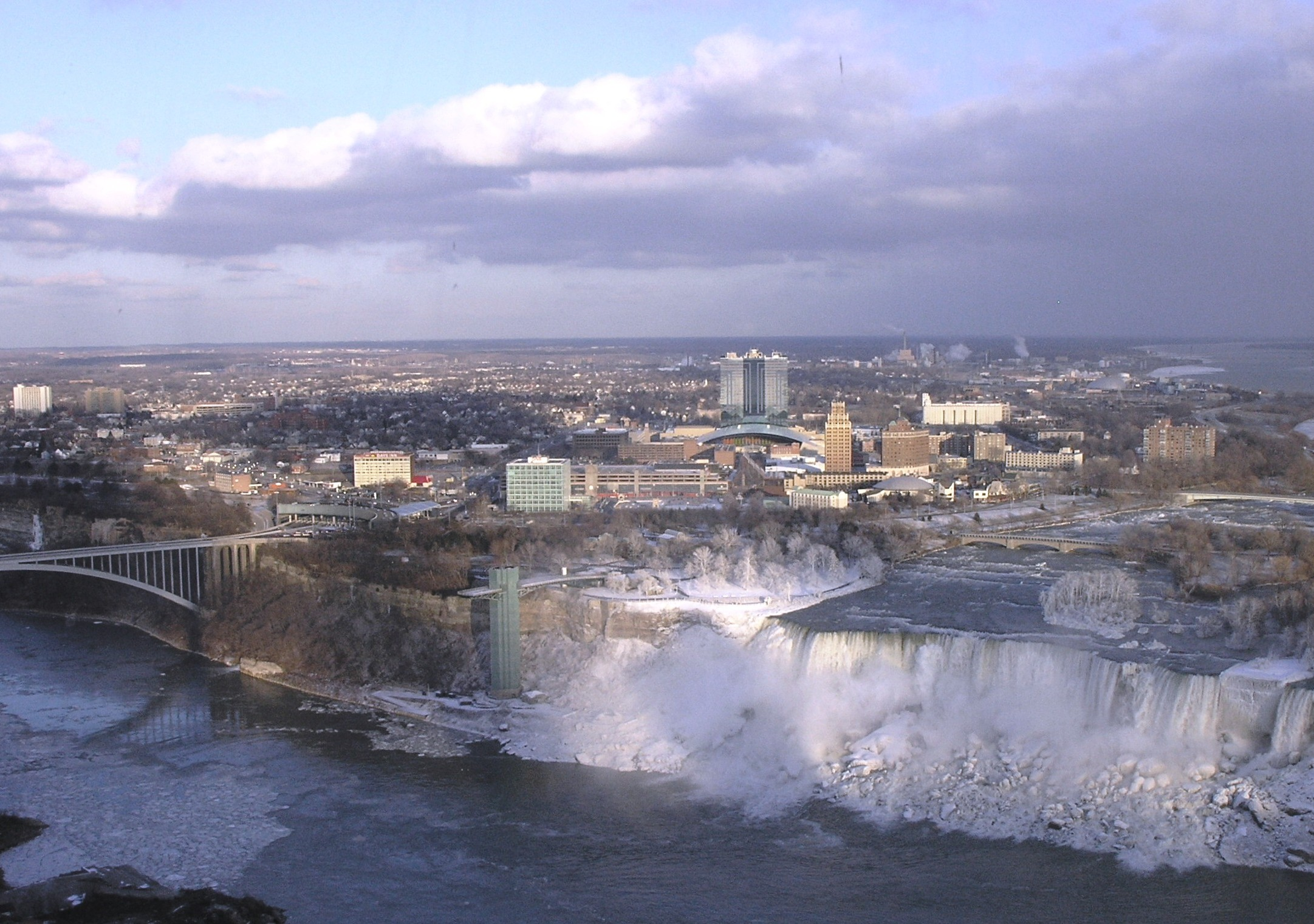
Skyline of Niagara Falls

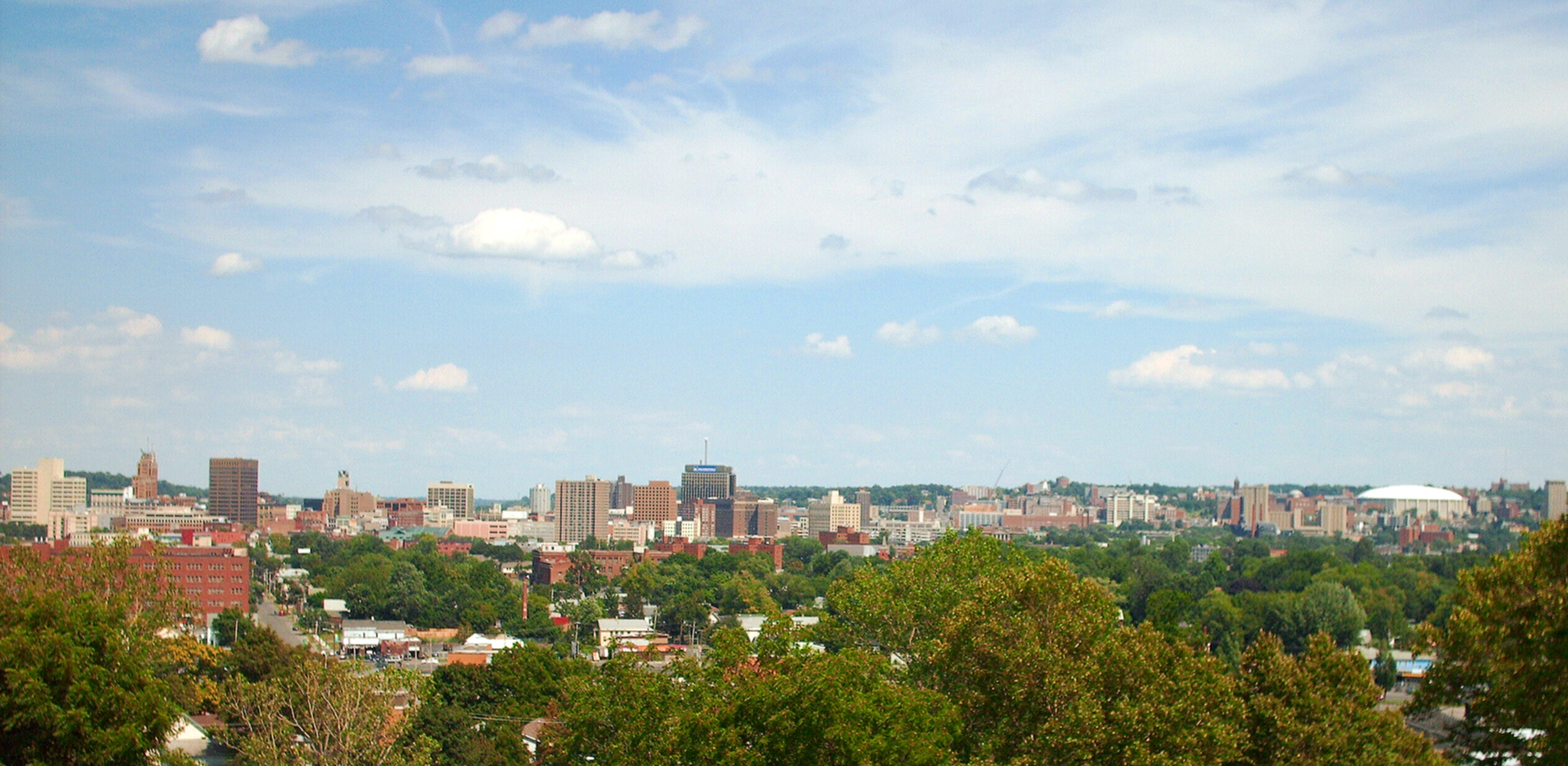
Skyline of Syracuse

This list ranks completed skyscrapers in Upstate New York that stand at least 290 feet (88 m) tall, based on standard height measurement. This includes spires and architectural details but does not include antenna masts. The "Year" column indicates the year in which a building was completed.

Rank	Name	Image	Height ft / m	Floors	Year	City	Notes
1	Erastus Corning Tower		589 / 180	44	1973	Albany	Tallest building in Albany and Albany County; Tallest building in Upstate New York constructed in the 1970s.
2	Seneca One Tower		529 / 161	40	1972	Buffalo	Tallest building in Buffalo and Erie County
3	Innovation Square		443 / 135	30	1968	Rochester	Tallest building in Rochester and Monroe County Tallest building in Upstate New York constructed in the 1960s.
4	Legacy Tower		401 / 122	20	1995	Rochester	Tallest building in Upstate New York constructed in the 1990s.
5	Buffalo City Hall		398 / 121.3	32	1931	Buffalo	Tallest building in Upstate New York constructed in the 1930s.
6	The Metropolitan		392 / 119	27	1973	Rochester	
7	Rand Building		391 / 119	29	1929	Buffalo	Tallest building in Upstate New York constructed in the 1920s.
8	Alfred E. Smith Building		388 / 118	34	1928	Albany	
9	Kodak Tower		360 / 110	19	1914	Rochester	Expanded from 16 to 19 floors in 1930 Tallest building in Upstate New York constructed in the 1910s.
10	Seneca Niagara Casino Tower		358 / 109	26	2006	Niagara Falls	Tallest building in Niagara Falls and Niagara County Tallest building in Upstate New York constructed in the 2000s.
11	Main Place Tower		350 / 107	26	1969	Buffalo	
12	Liberty Building		345 / 105	23	1925	Buffalo	333 feet (101 meters) to the roof
13	One M&T Plaza		317 / 97	21	1966	Buffalo	
14	State Tower Building		312 / 95.4	23	1927	Syracuse	Tallest building in Syracuse and Onondanga County
15 (tied)	1, 2, 3, and 4 Empire State Plaza		310 / 94	23	1966	Albany	Also known as the Agency Buildings
19	First Federal Plaza		309 / 94	21	1976	Rochester	Top was formerly a revolving restaurant
20	Electric Tower		294 / 90	14	1912	Buffalo	Also known as the Niagara Mohawk Building.

== Timeline of tallest buildings ==
This section lists buildings that once held the title of tallest building in Upstate New York. Saint Paul's Episcopal Cathedral held the title twice, both before the construction and after the demolition of the original Electric Tower, which was designed as a temporary building that would only last the length of the Pan-American Exposition.

Years as tallest	Name	City	Image	Height ft / m	Floors	Notes
1851–1901	Saint Paul's Episcopal Cathedral	Buffalo		275 / 84	N/A	
1901–1902	Electric Tower (Pan-American Exposition)	Buffalo		389 / 119	N/A	Demolished shortly after the close of the Pan-American Exposition. Not to be confused with the present-day Electric Tower at Washington and East Huron Streets, listed below. Second-tallest building in New York State at the time of its construction, only two feet (61 cm) shorter than the Park Row Building in New York City. Tallest building ever destroyed in Upstate New York. Tallest building ever destroyed in the world until 1965
1902–1912	Saint Paul's Episcopal Cathedral	Buffalo		275 / 84	N/A	
1912–1914	Electric Tower	Buffalo		294 / 90	14	
1914–1925	Kodak Tower	Rochester		unknown	16	Expanded from 16 to 19 floors in 1930. Exact pre-1930 height unknown.
1925–1928	Liberty Building	Buffalo		345 / 105	23	
1928–1929	Alfred E. Smith Building	Albany		388 / 118	34	
1929–1931	Rand Building	Buffalo		391 / 119	29	First building to exceed the height of the original Electric Tower, demolished 27 years earlier.
1931–1972	Buffalo City Hall	Buffalo		398 / 121	32	
1972–1973	Seneca One Tower	Buffalo		529 / 161	40	Originally known as One Marine Midland Center.
1973–present	Erastus Corning Tower	Albany		589 / 180	44	

== See also ==
=== List of tallest buildings by city ===
- List of tallest buildings in New York City
  - List of tallest buildings in Brooklyn
  - List of tallest buildings in Queens
- List of tallest buildings in Albany, New York
- List of tallest buildings in Buffalo, New York
- List of tallest buildings in Rochester, New York
- List of tallest buildings in Syracuse, New York
