= Legacy Tower (Rochester, New York) =

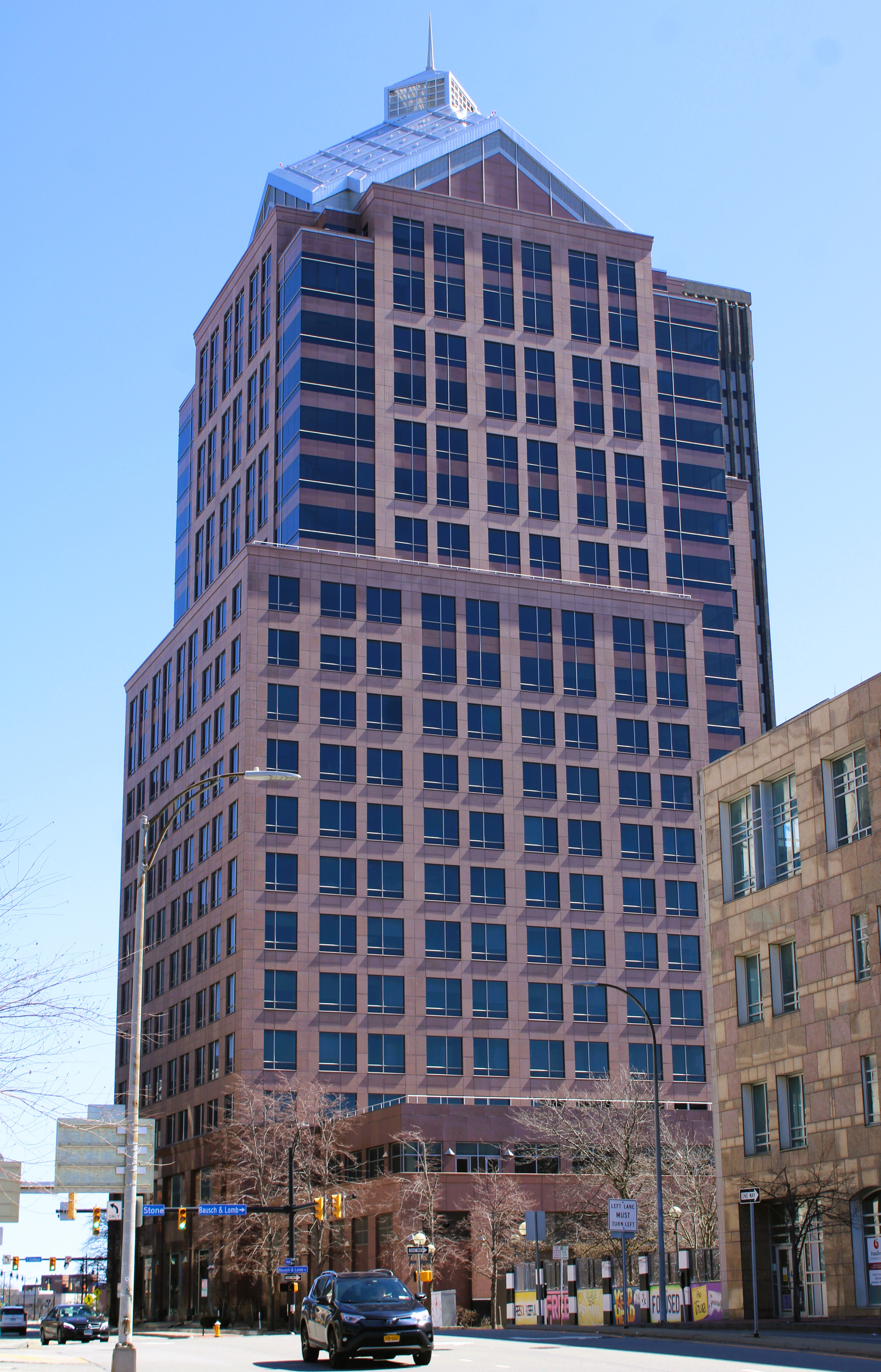

General information
- Status: Completed
- Type: Office
- Location: 1 Bausch and Lomb Place, Rochester, New York
- Coordinates: 43°9′17.2″N 77°36′21″W
- Opening: October 17, 1995 (31 years ago)
- Owner: Buckingham Properties, Robert C. Morgan & Cos., and Flaum Management Co.

Height
- Antenna spire: 401 ft (122 m)

Technical details
- Floor count: 20
- Floor area: 460,000 sq ft (43,000 m^{2})

Design and construction
- Architect: Fox & Fowle Architects, P.C.

Website
- https://www.buckprop.com/listing/legacy-tower-2/

Legacy Tower (formerly Bausch & Lomb Place) is a skyscraper located in Rochester, New York. It is the second tallest building in Rochester, standing at 401 feet (122 meters) with 20 floors. It was constructed in 1994, making it the latest skyscraper of Rochester, New York, and was the world headquarters for the Rochester-based eye care company Bausch & Lomb until 2014. When they moved out and sold it to 2 local developers, Robert C. Morgan & Cos and Buckingham Properties. That same year, the building was renamed Legacy for the legacy of Bausch and Lomb and the building's former owner Larry Glazer, and his wife Jane, both of whom died in a plane crash. From November 2003 to November 2004, the number 150 was on the sides of the building, in celebration of the company's 150th anniversary.

== See also ==
- List of tallest buildings in Rochester, New York
- List of tallest buildings in Upstate New York
