= Kodak Tower =

Skyscraper in Rochester, New York

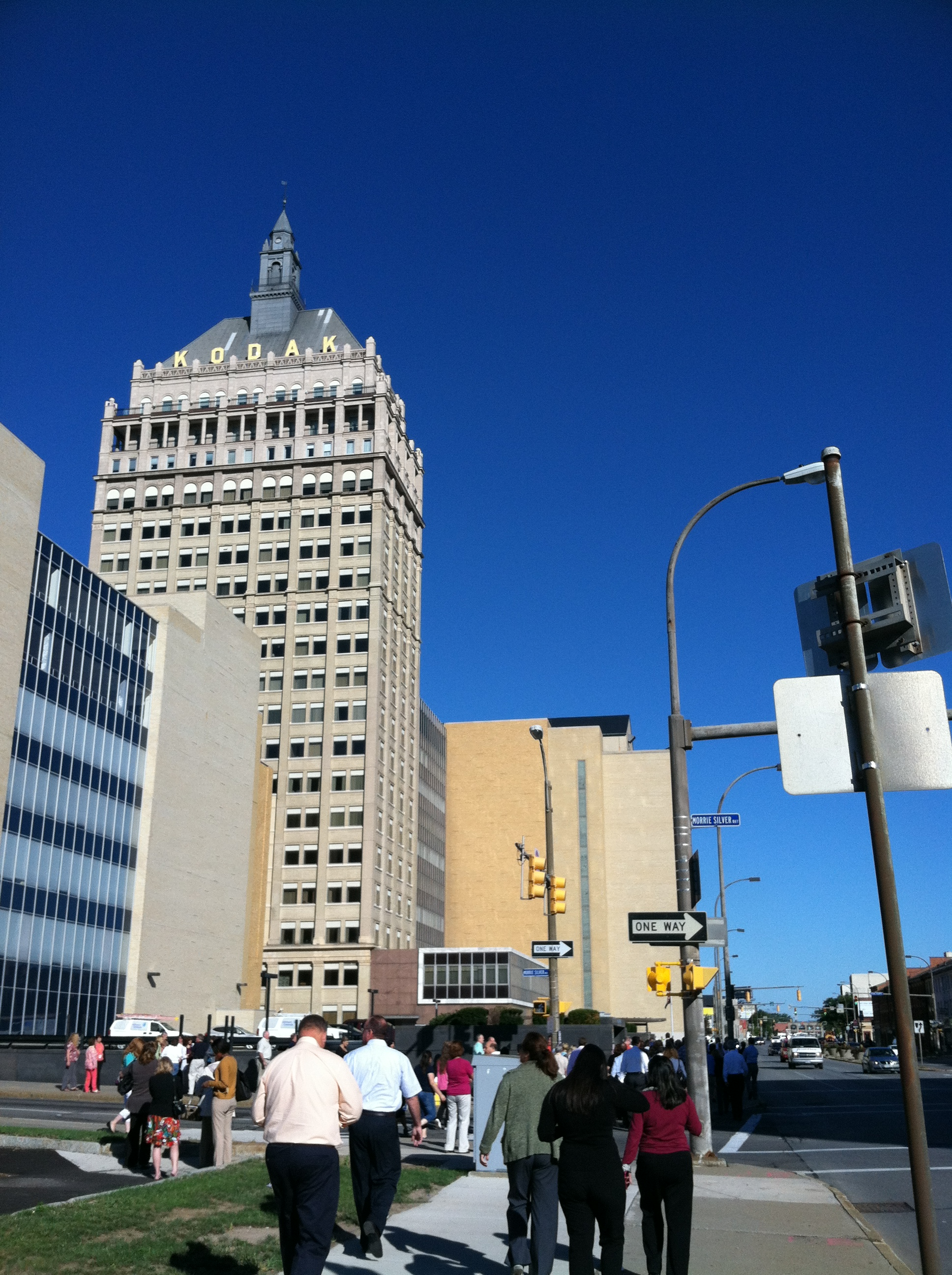
- Kodak Tower as seen from Morrie Silver Way
- Interactive map of the Kodak Tower area
- Alternative names: Kodak Office Tower; Building 7

Record height
- Tallest in Rochester, NY from 1914 to 1968^{[I]}
- Preceded by: Saint Michael's Church
- Surpassed by: Xerox Tower (1968–present)

General information
- Type: Office
- Location: 343 State St; Rochester, New York
- Coordinates: 43°9′39″N 77°37′11″W
- Current tenants: Eastman Kodak Company
- Construction started: 1912
- Completed: 1914
- Opening: 1914
- Renovated: 1935, 2008
- Owner: Eastman Kodak Company
- Operator: Eastman Kodak Company

Height
- Antenna spire: 360 feet (110 m)
- Roof: 340 feet (100 m)
- Top floor: 260 feet (79 m)

Technical details
- Floor count: 19
- Lifts/elevators: 5

Design and construction
- Architects: Gordon & Kaelber Architects, Howard Wright Cutler

Kodak Tower is a 19-story skyscraper in the High Falls District of Rochester, New York, and is part of the Eastman Kodak Headquarters complex. It has a roof height of 340 ft (103.6 m) and stands 366 ft (111.6 m) with its antenna spire included. It was Rochester's tallest building for over 50 years from its completion in 1914 until the Xerox Square Tower surpassed it in the late 1960s. Today, it is the 4th tallest building in Rochester and is the 9th tallest building in New York state outside New York City.

The Kodak Tower has long been recognized as a landmark in the Rochester skyline, and an icon in the world of film photography. The building has also been called the "nerve center of photography".

The Eastman Kodak Company owns the skyscraper, and it remains the company's headquarters. In 2008, Kodak undertook work to repair and restore the exterior of the building.

== History ==
The Kodak Tower was constructed on the site of a former factory next to several seven-story Camera Works buildings that clustered around the site. Construction began in 1912 and was completed in 1914 with Kodak founder George Eastman presiding over the project. Upon its completion in 1914, the tower held the title of the tallest building in Rochester, New York until the 1960s.

=== Design and construction ===
Kodak Tower was designed by Howard Wright Cutler and Gordon & Kaelber Architects with a French Renaissance style. When construction began in 1912, the building was designed as a 16-story high-rise with a steel skeleton faced with terra cotta. The building overtook the Powers Building to become the tallest building in the city upon its completion in 1914.

=== Spire Addition ===
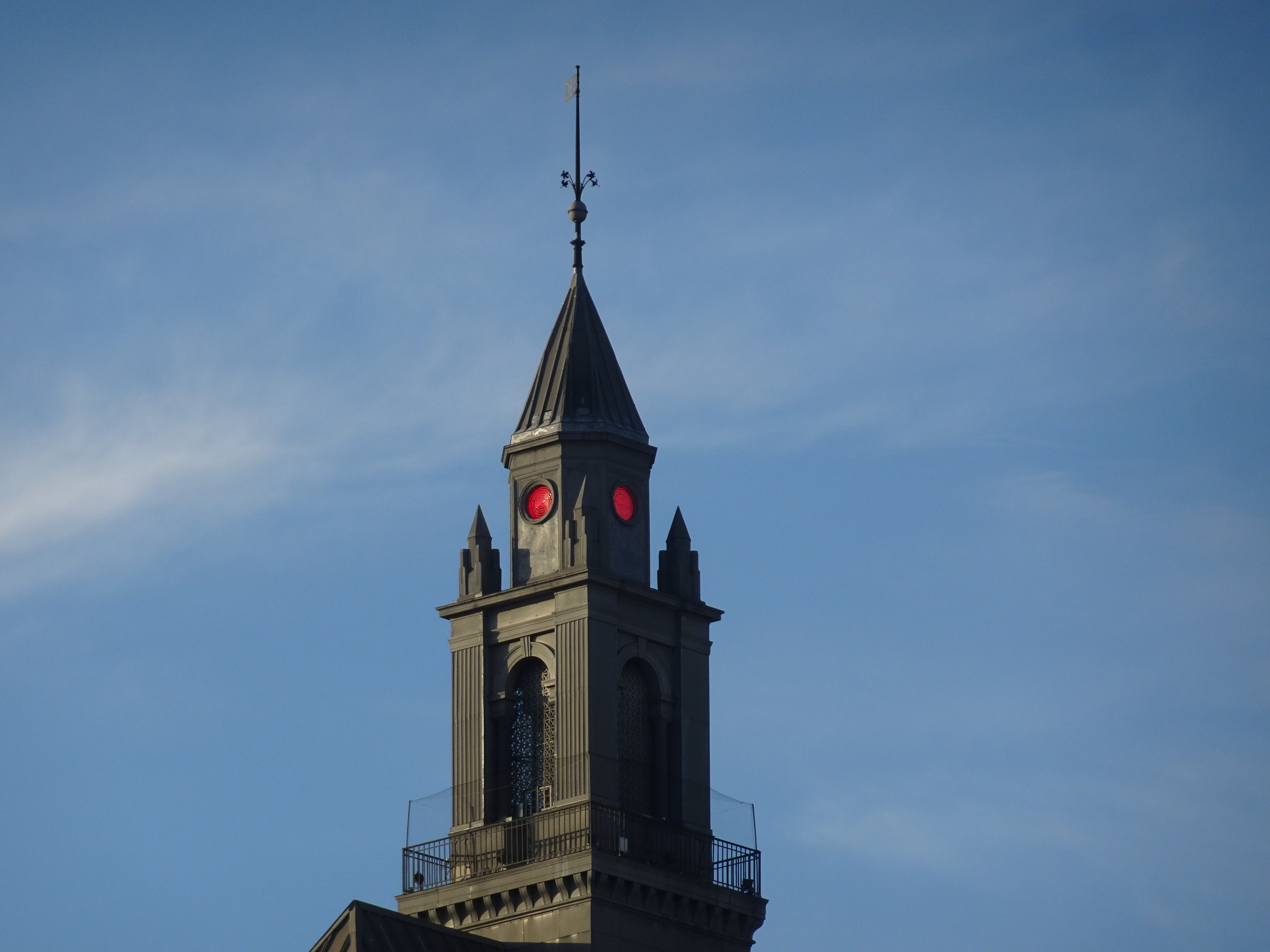
Spire detail

In the late 1920s, the architects of the Genesee Valley Trust building announced plans to mount an architectural feature that would threaten the Kodak Tower's status as the city's tallest building. Following the announcement Eastman Kodak hired an architect to construct 3 more floors on the building with a mansard roof and aluminium tower bringing the tower to a height of 366 ft (111.6 m) feet in 1935.

=== Peregrine Falcon Webcam ===
In 1994 Dennis Money, the founder of the Rochester Peregrine Falcon Project, received permission from Kodak to install a nest box on the spire of the Kodak Office Tower. The nest box was installed as part of an effort to reintroduce peregrine falcons to eastern North America after the species was listed on the U.S. Endangered Species list.

In 1998 a pair of peregrine falcons known to the public as Mariah & Cabot-Sirocco began nesting in the nest box. The reintroduction effort became popular over the web after Brad Carney, an IT Consultant at Eastman Kodak, coordinated an effort to install web cams around the nest and made the web cam imagery available online for the public to view. The web cam quickly became a popular attraction on the Kodak website.

Mariah hatched 43 falcon chicks at the top of the Kodak Tower until the nest box was relocated to the Times Square Building in 2008 when Eastman Kodak announced plans to do extensive restoration work on the Tower.

== Architecture ==
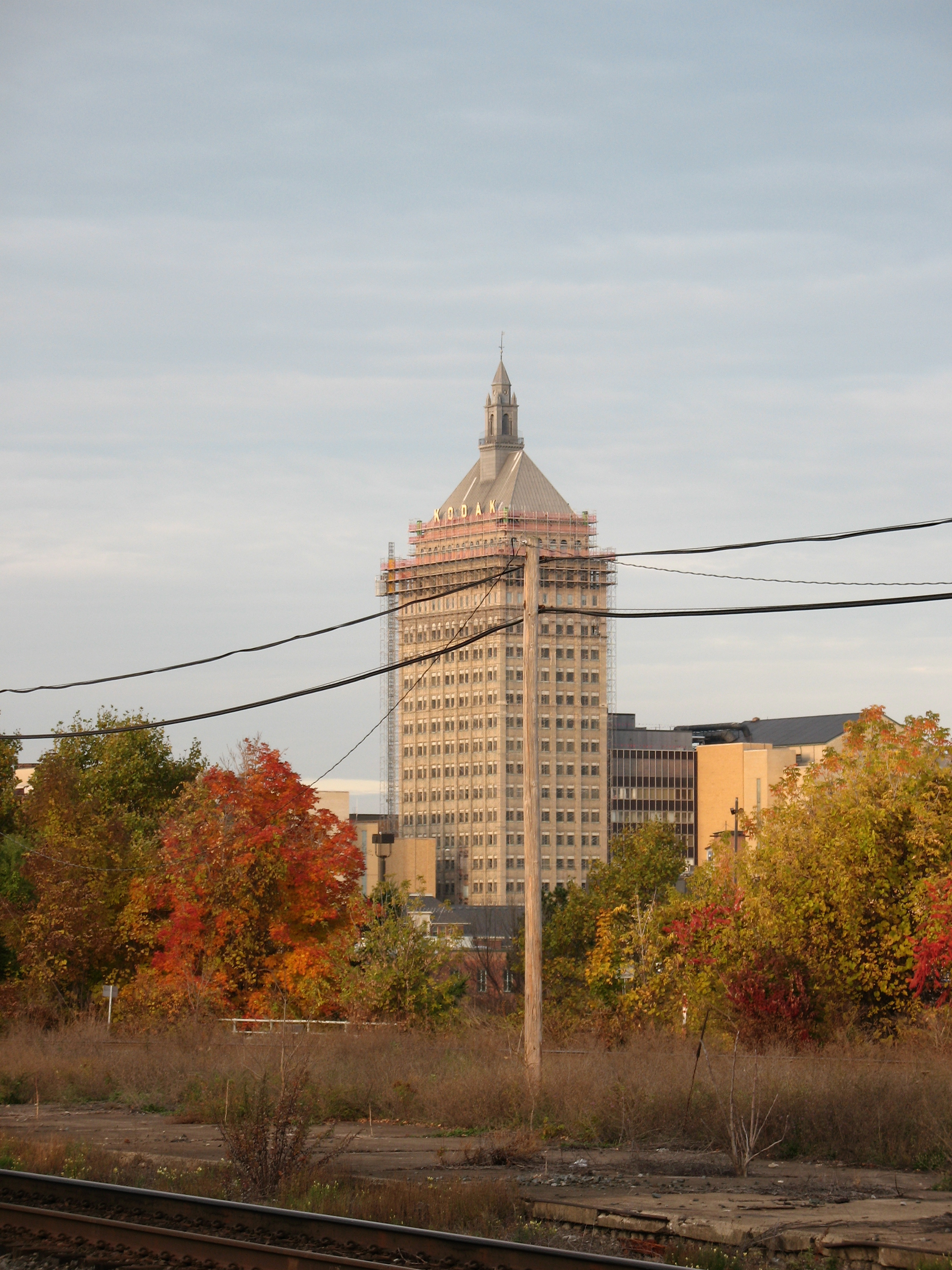
Kodak Tower Under Renovation in 2008

Kodak Tower is 340 ft (103.6 m) tall to its roof and reaches a full height of 366 ft (111.6 m) tall. The building has 19 floors of commercial office space occupied exclusively by the Eastman Kodak Company. Atop the building is an 18th and 19th floor balcony with a steep gothic steeple and a lightning rod with the initials EK for Eastman Kodak at the very top of the building.

=== Signage and Lights ===
A block letter sign that spells out the company name KODAK is displayed at the roof level of the north and the south sides of the tower. Throughout the night the sign is lit up with red neon lights. In addition to the sign, the tower's 18th and 19th balcony facade is lighted during special occasions such as sporting events and holidays.

=== Restoration ===
On June 13, 2008, Eastman Kodak announced that it would repair and restore the tower's exterior. The building needed urgent repairs due to deterioration in the masonry in many locations on the tower which threatened the building's safety and integrity. The restoration was completed in 2010.

== Gallery ==
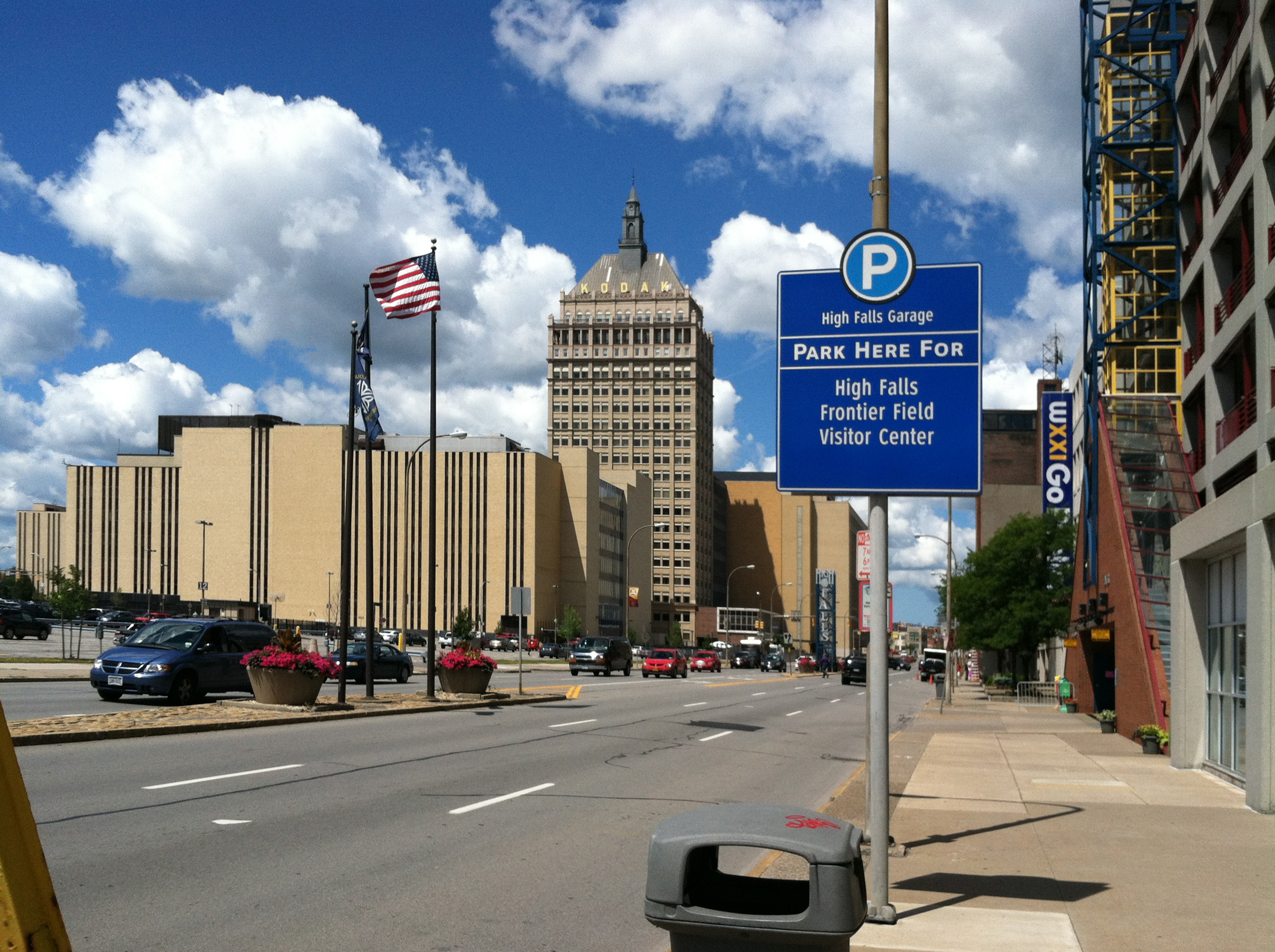
Kodak Tower from Commercial Street

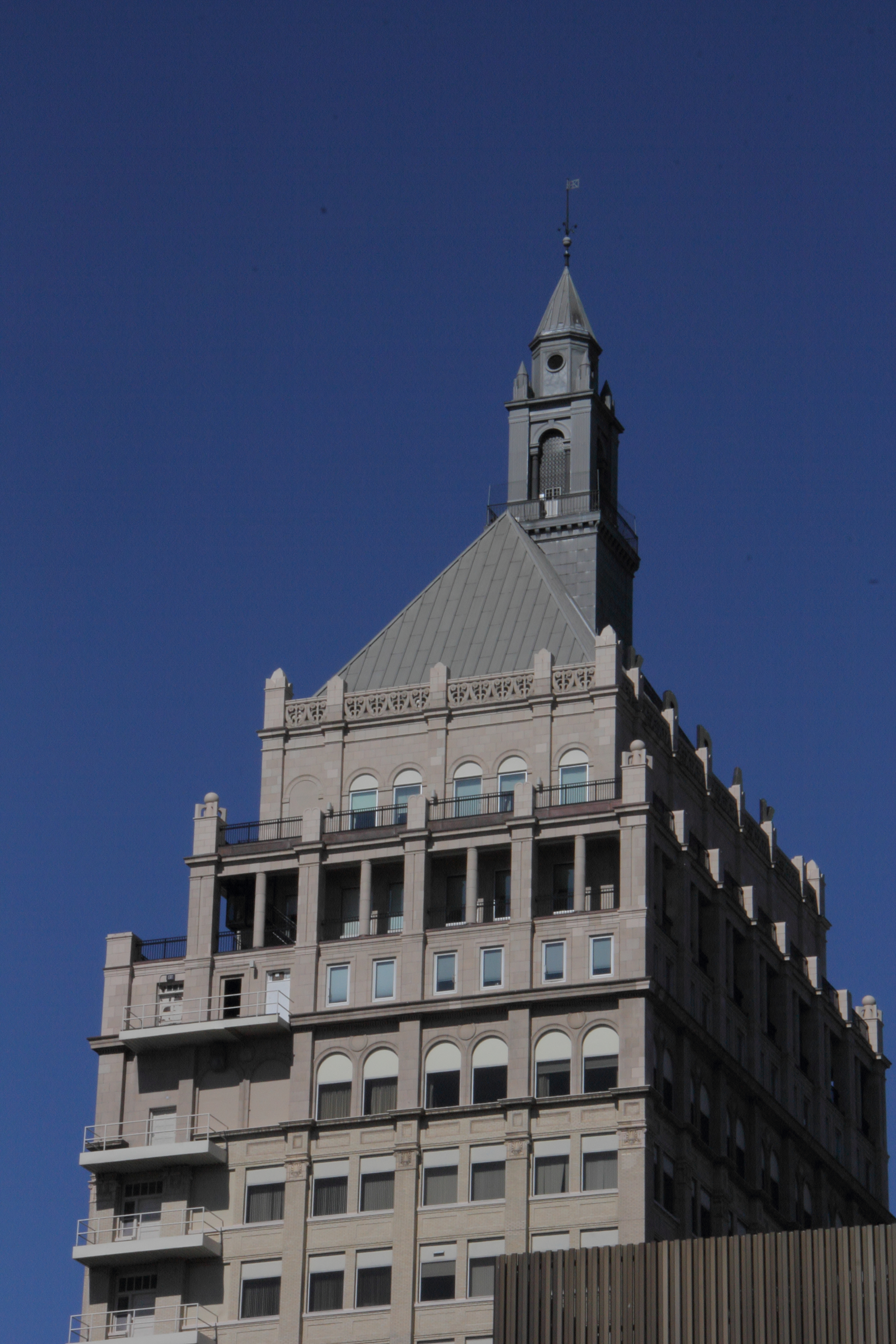
Kodak Tower Balcony & Spire

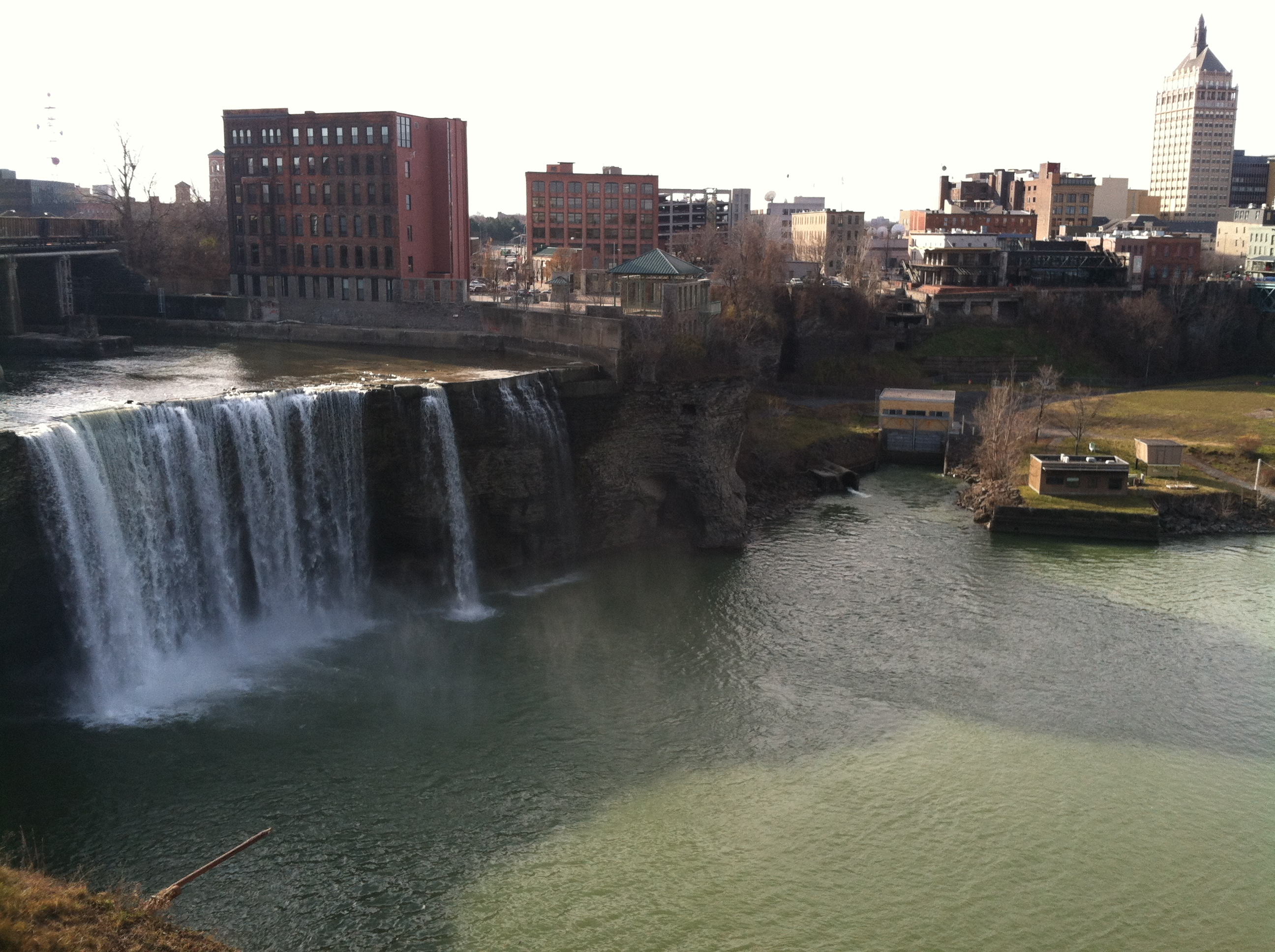
Kodak Tower from High Falls

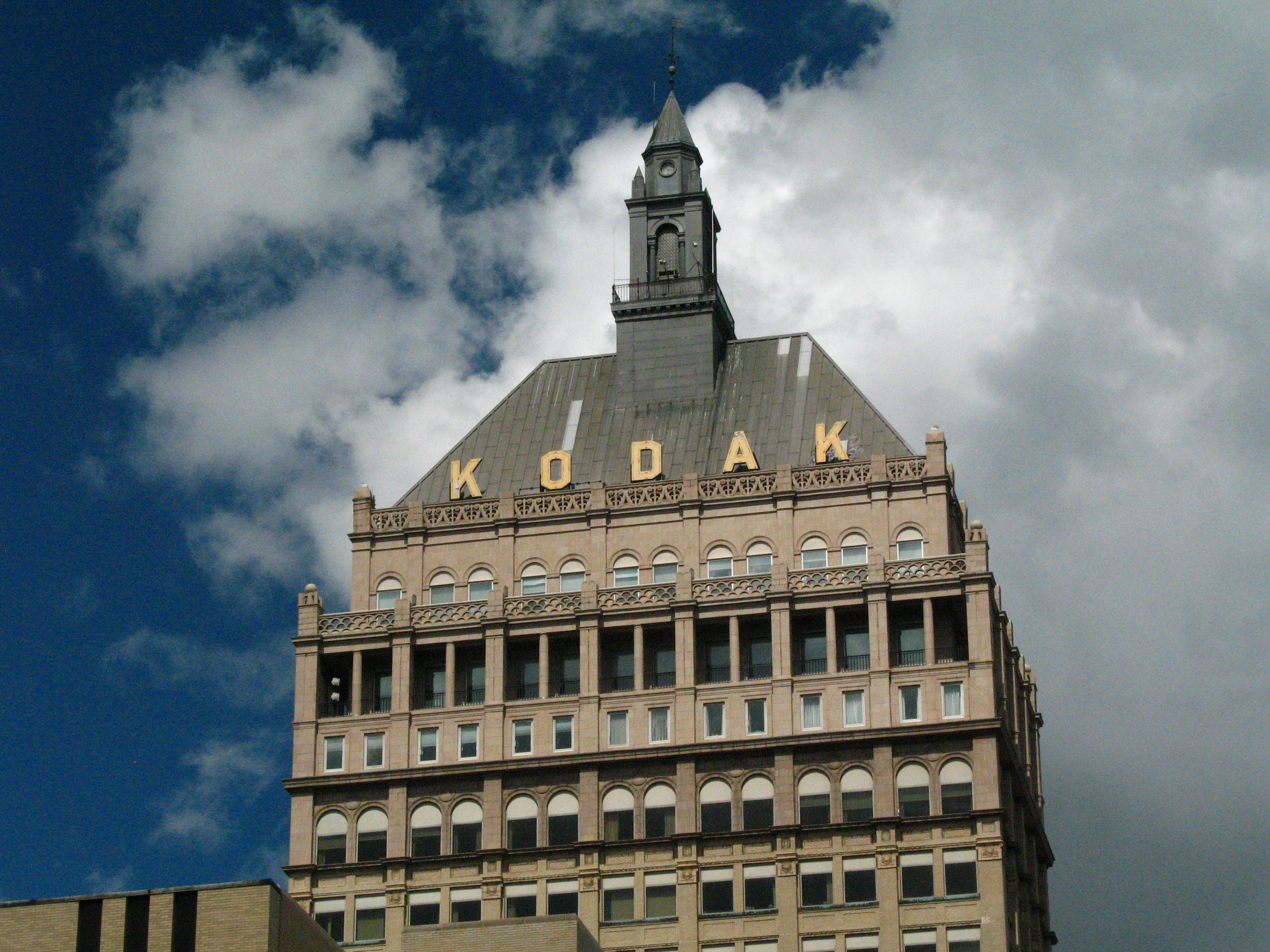
The top of the Kodak Tower, August 2008

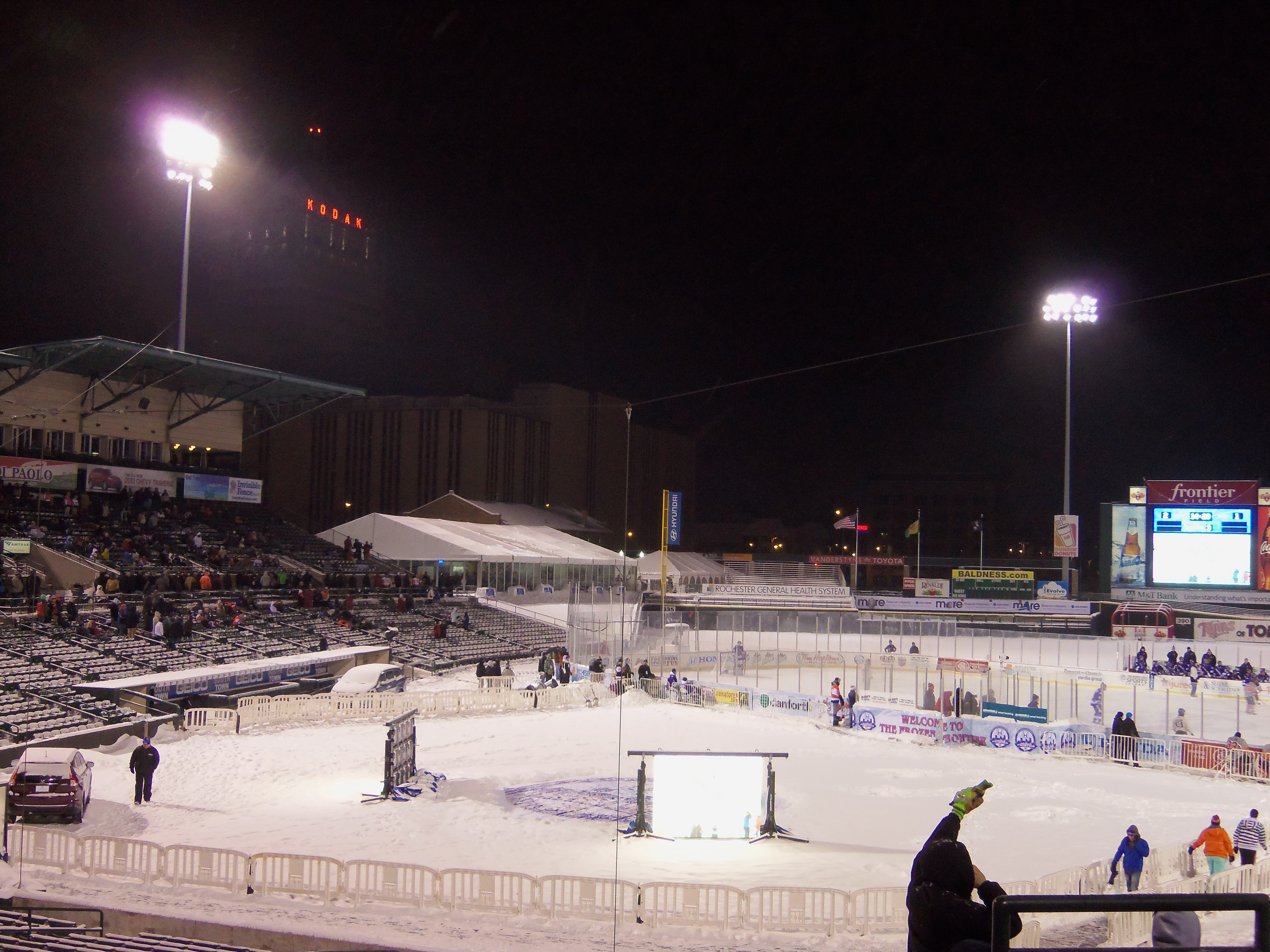
Kodak Tower from Frontier Field during an outdoor hockey game.

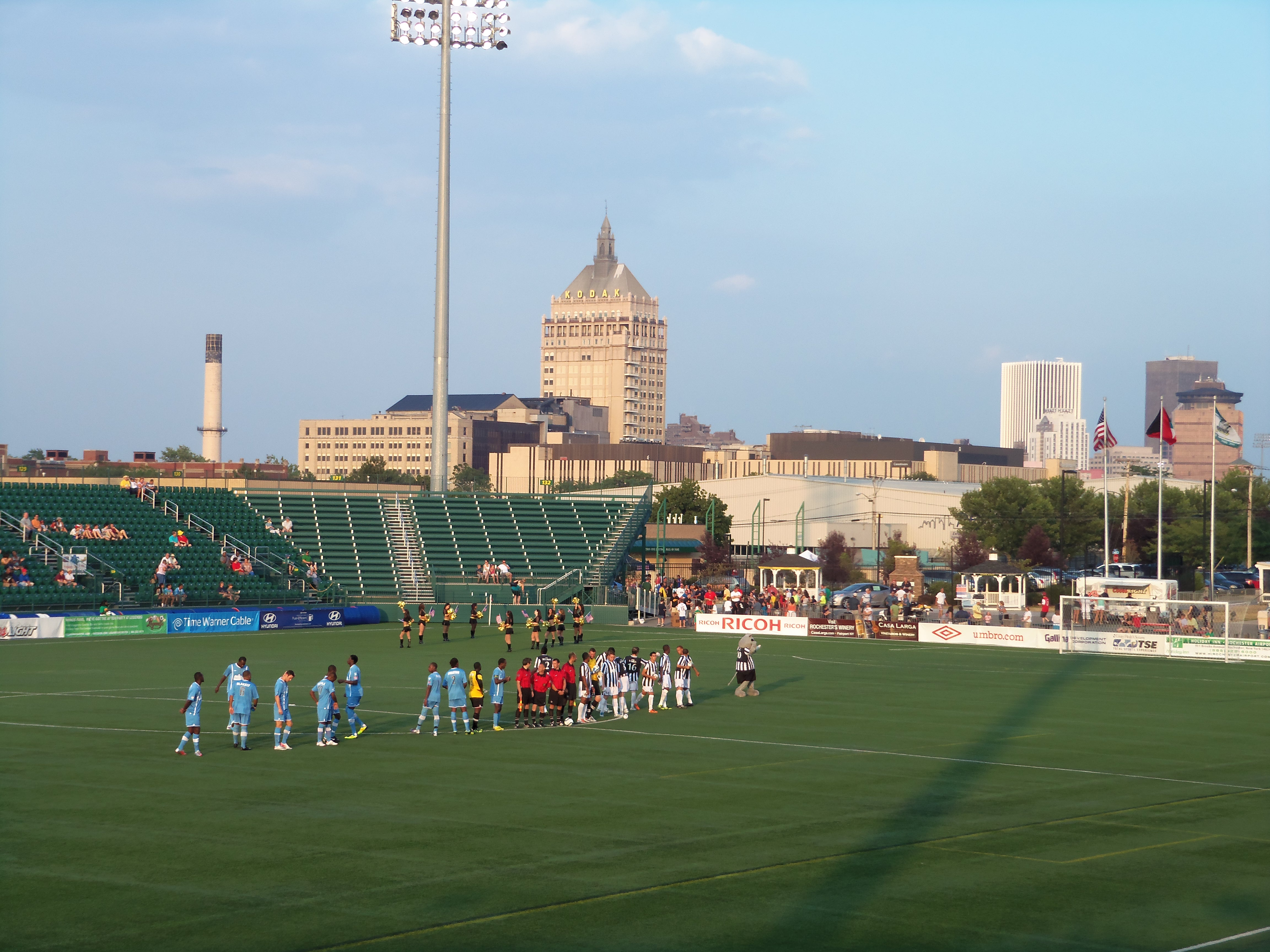
Kodak Tower from Rochester Community Sports Complex Stadium

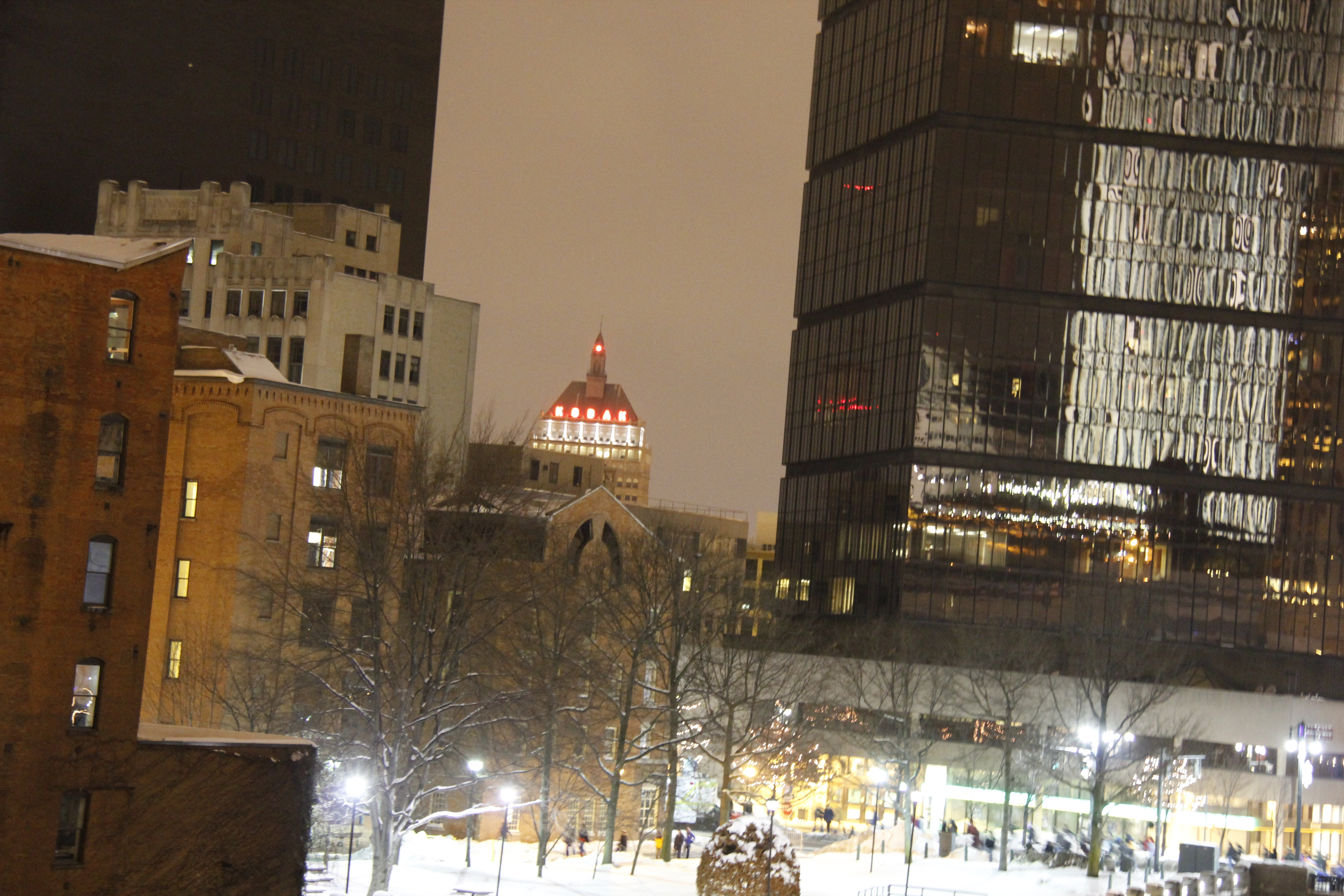
Kodak Tower from Broad Street

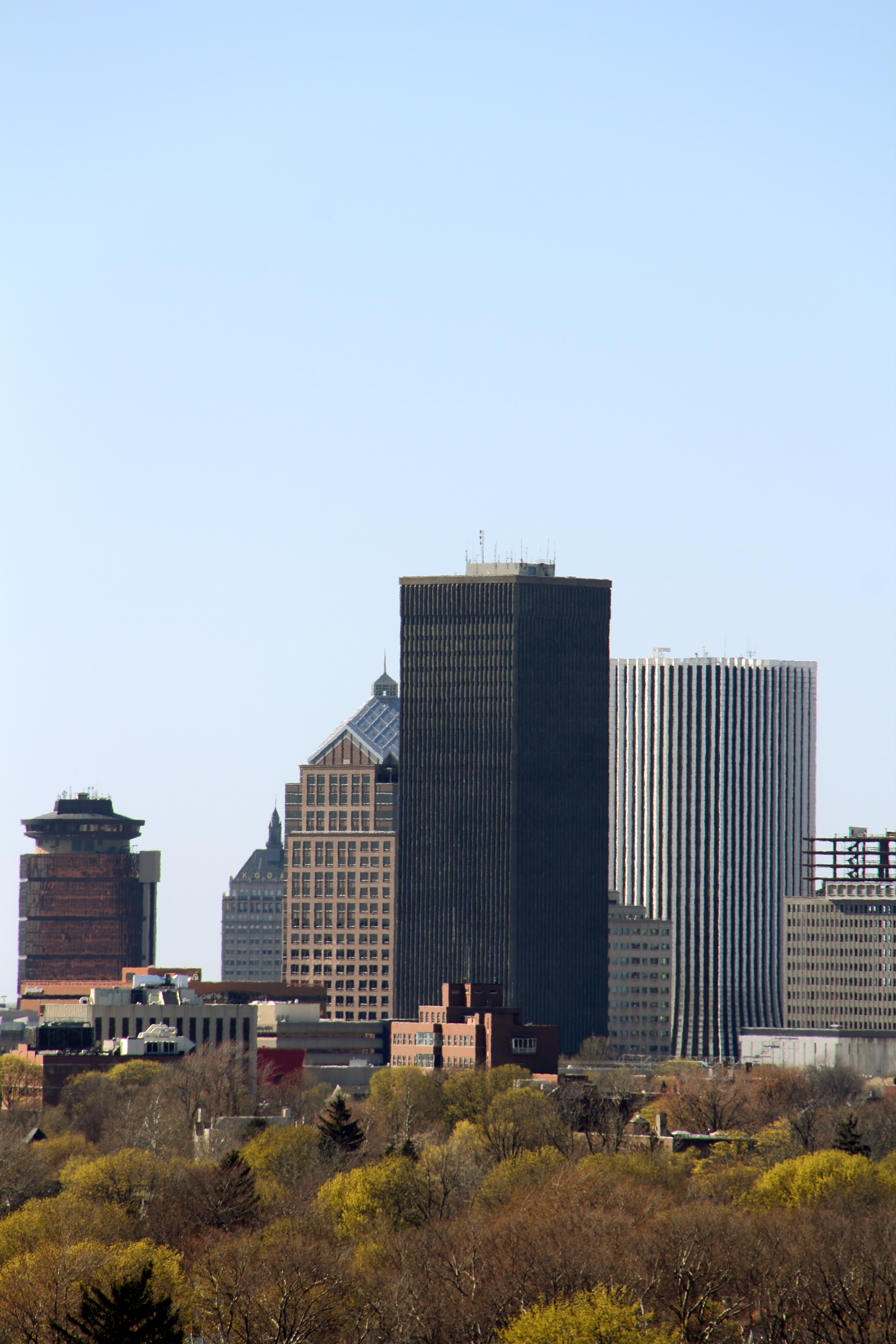
Rochester, NY Skyline With Kodak Tower in the Background

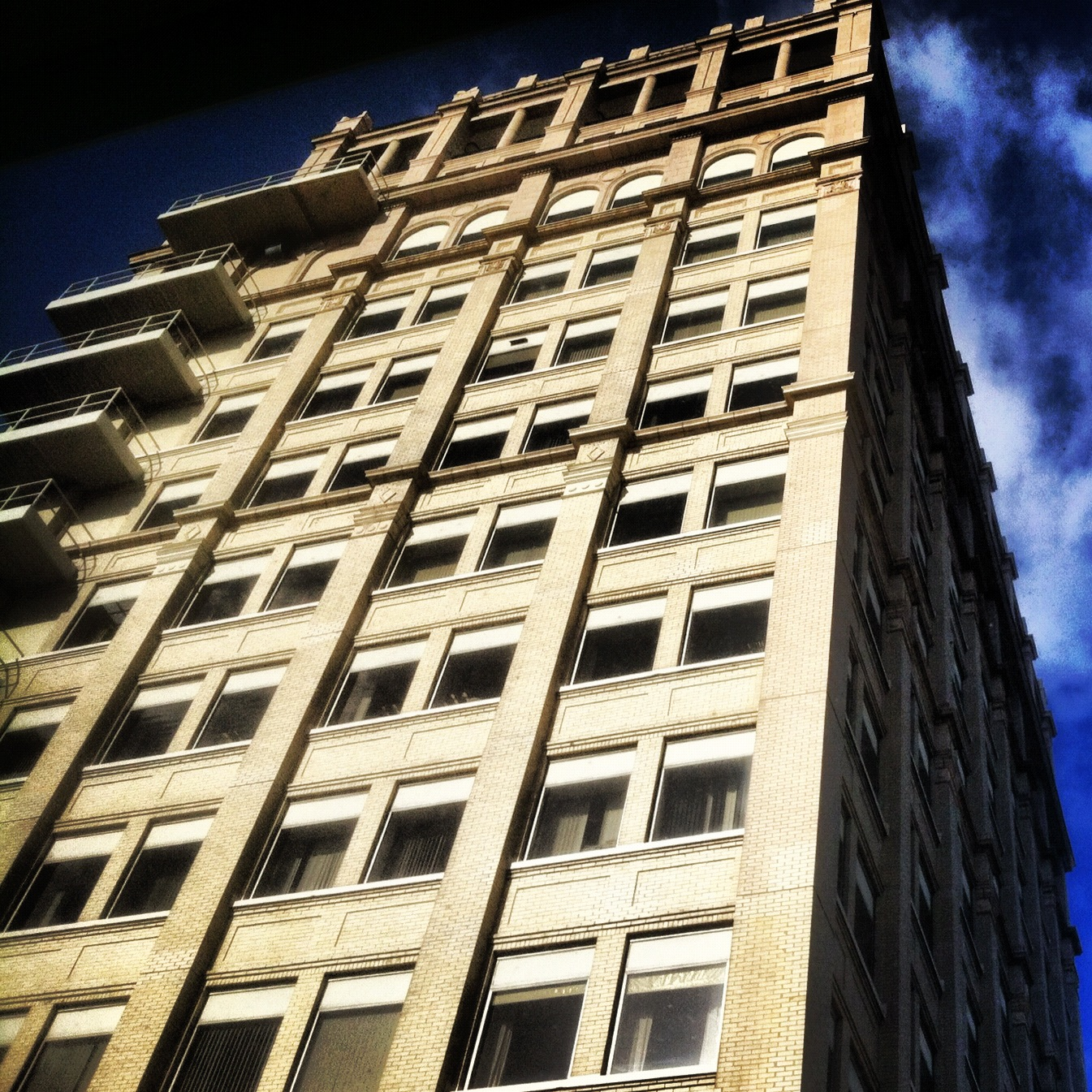
Exterior Facade of Kodak Tower

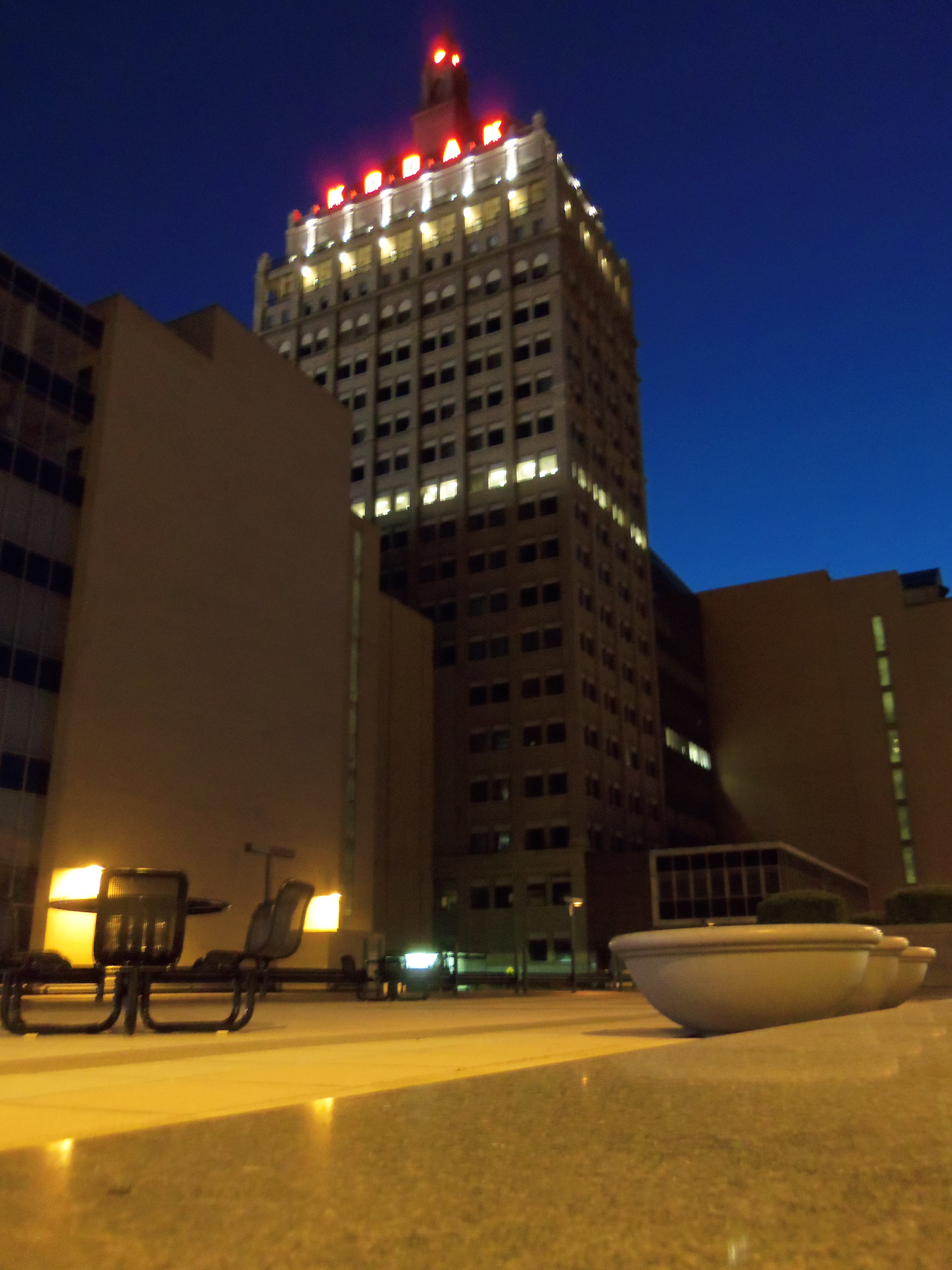
Kodak Tower Lighting at Night

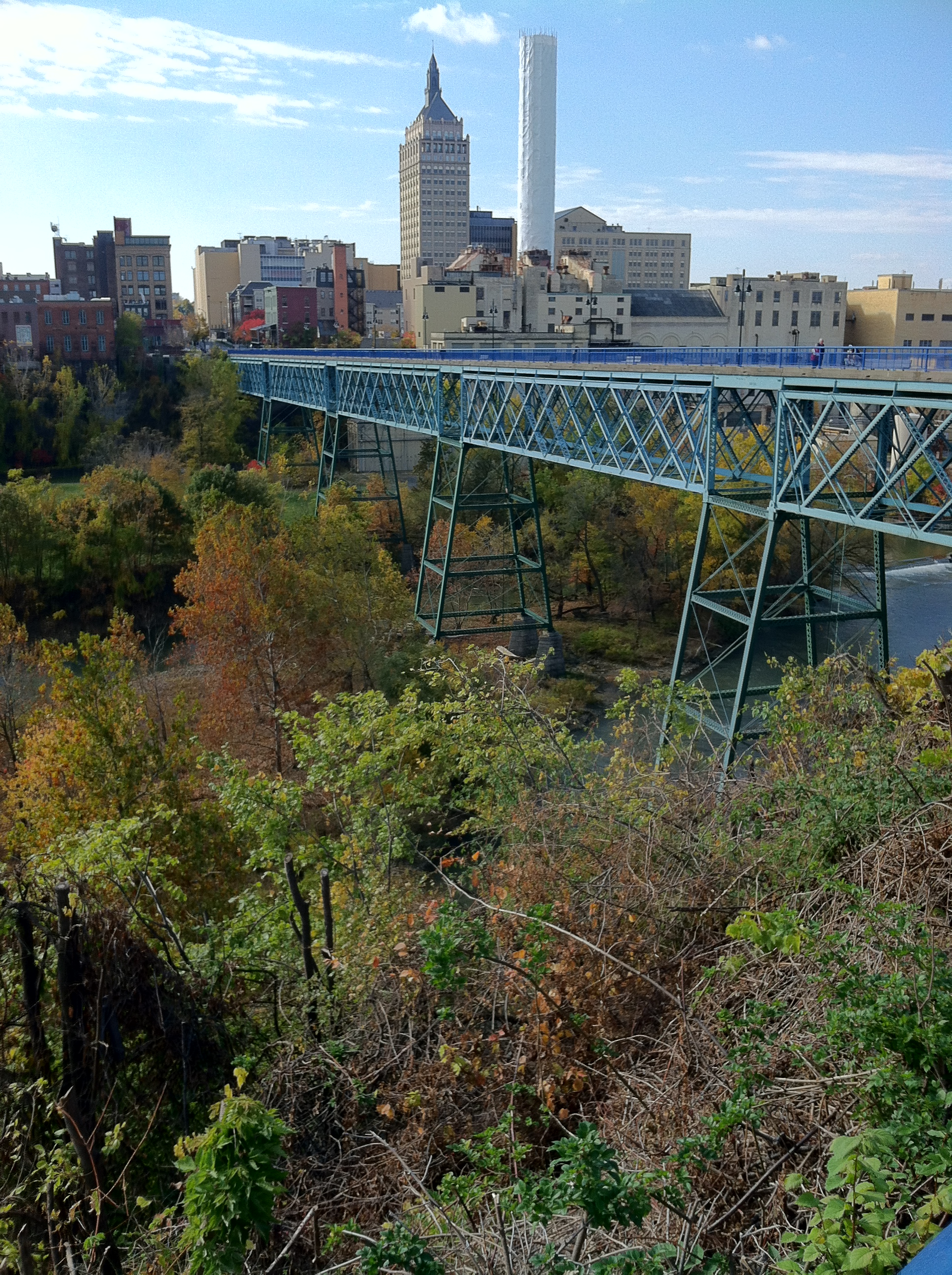
Kodak Tower From High Falls With Pont De Rennes bridge

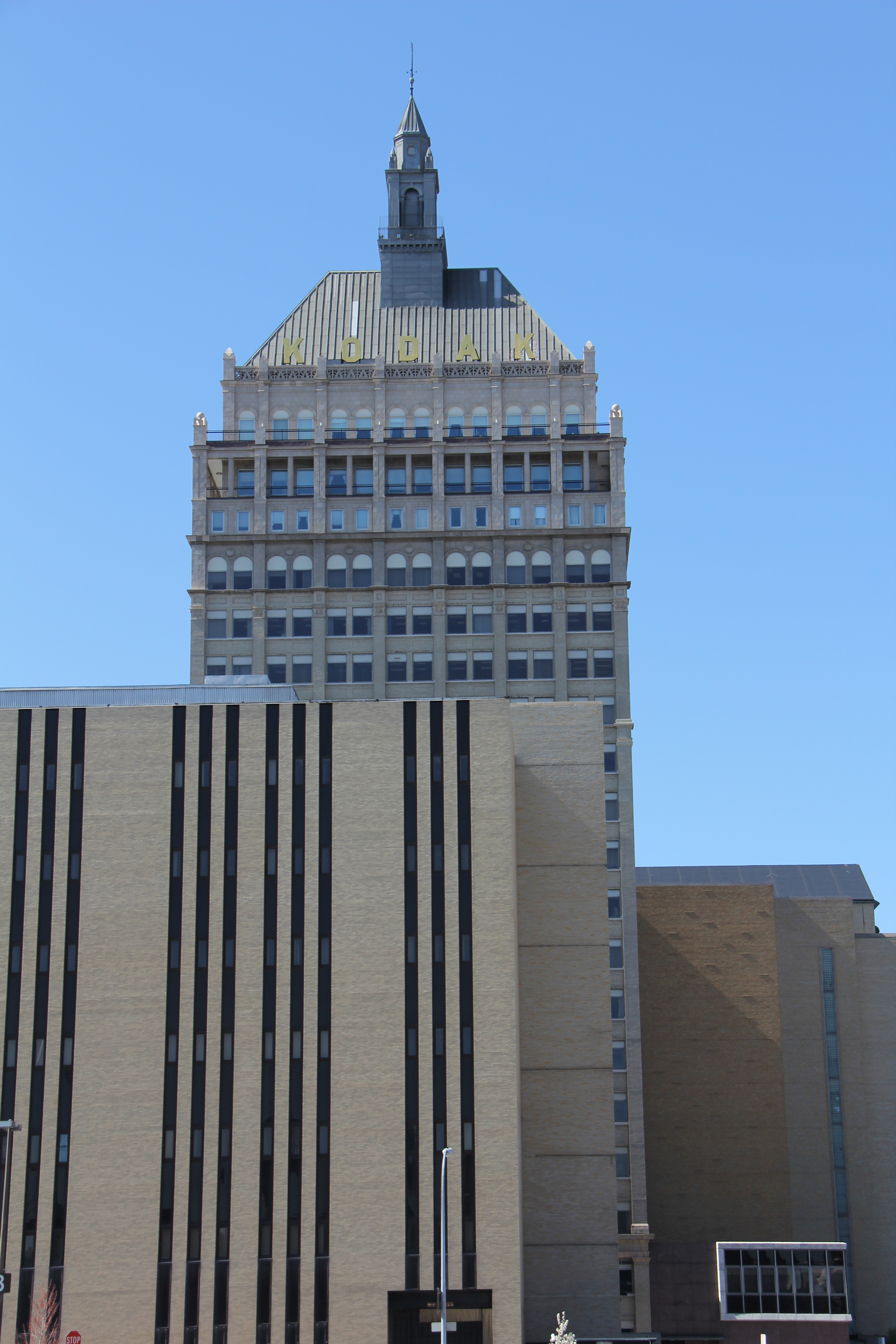
Kodak Tower From South

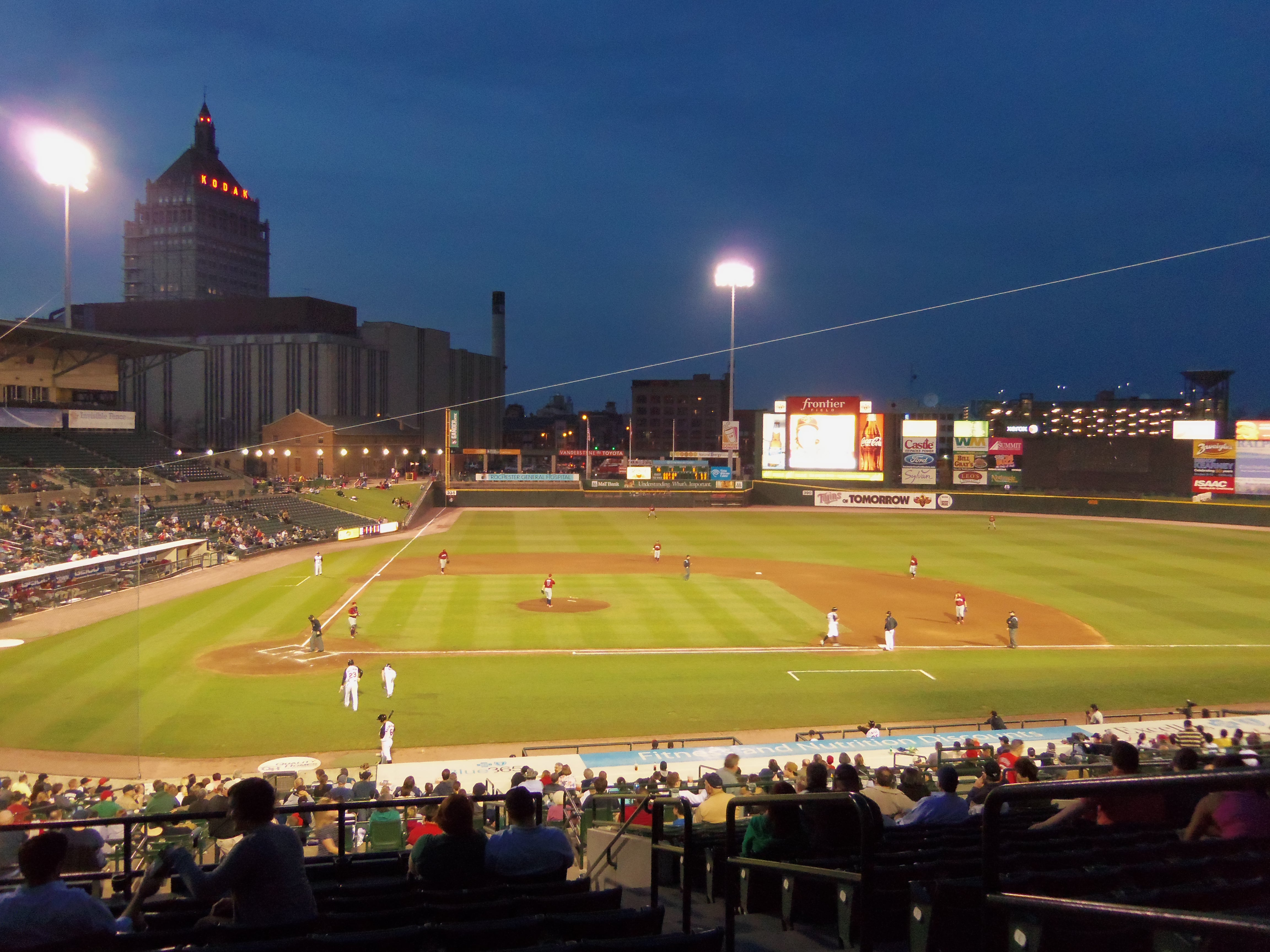
Kodak Tower From Frontier Field During a summer baseball game.
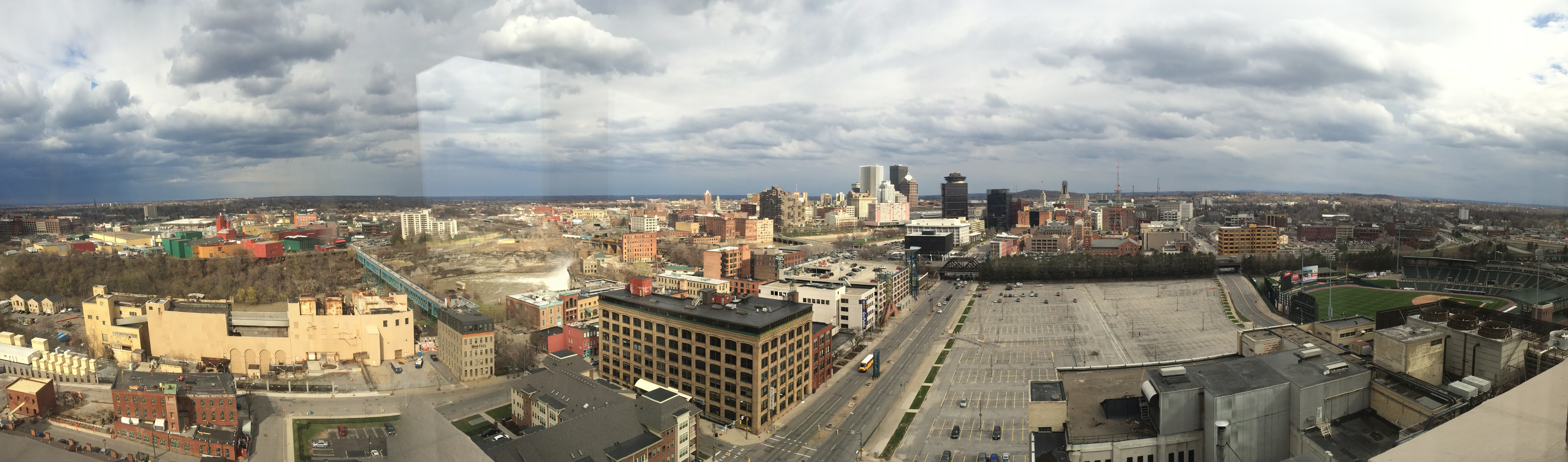
Panorama of Rochester skyline as seen from Kodak Tower

== See also ==
- Eastman Kodak Company
- George Eastman
- List of tallest buildings in Rochester, New York
- List of tallest buildings in Upstate New York
- Peregrine falcon

Records
Preceded by Saint Michael's Church	Tallest building in Rochester, NY; 366 feet (112 m); 1914–1968	Succeeded by Xerox Tower
