= List of tallest buildings in Rochester, New York =

Skyline of Rochester
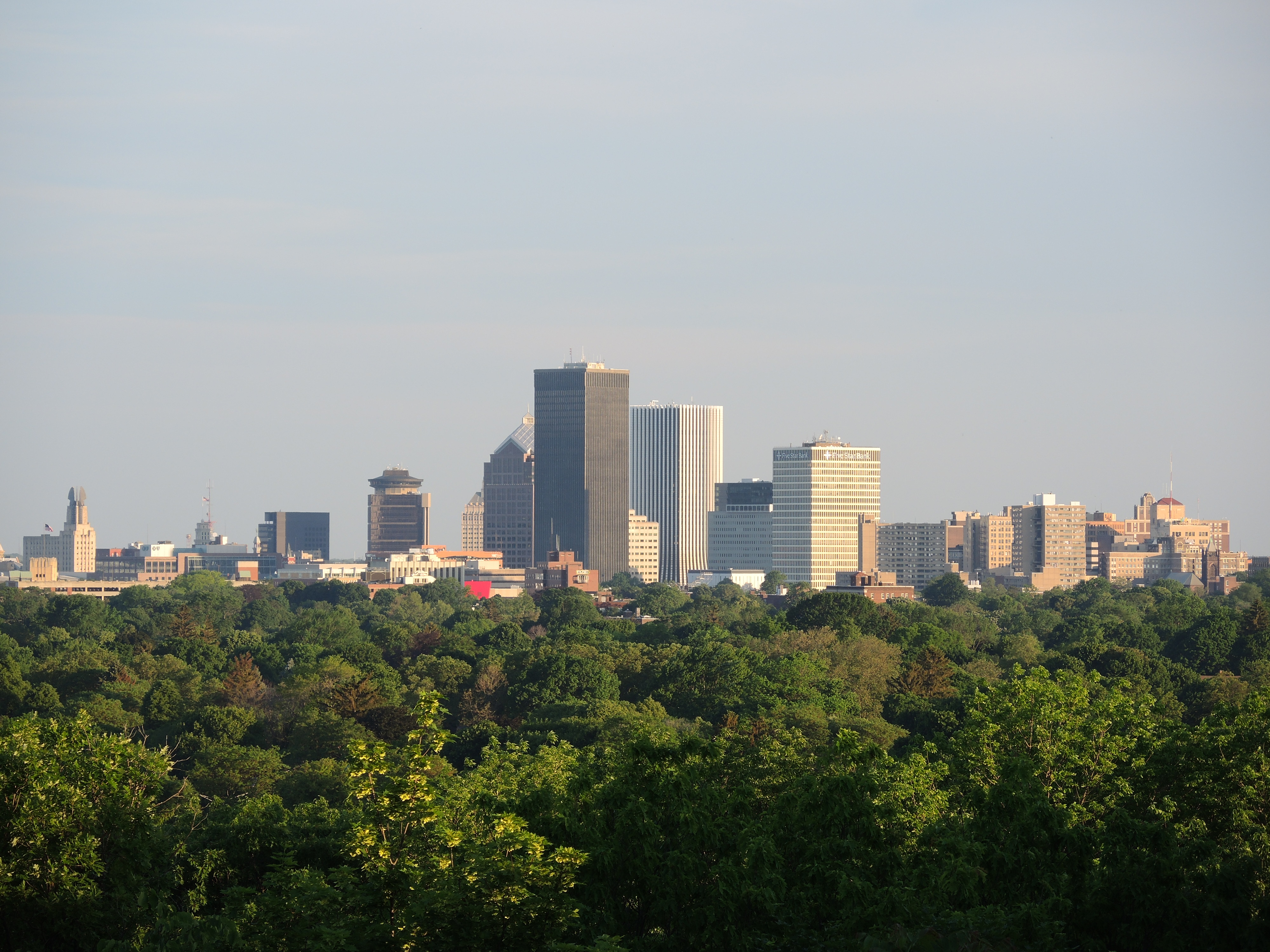
- View of Rochester from Cobbs Hill
- Tallest building: Innovation Square (1967)
- Tallest building height: 443 feet (135 m)

Number of tall buildings (2025)
- Taller than 100 m (328 ft): 4

Number of tall buildings — feet
- Taller than 300 ft (91.4 m): 5

This list of tallest buildings in Rochester ranks high-rise buildings in the U.S. city of Rochester, New York by height. The tallest building in the city is Innovation Square, formerly known as the Xerox Tower, which rises 443 feet (135 m) and was completed in 1968.

== Tallest buildings ==
Was the tallest building in Rochester, New York upon completion

This lists ranks Rochester skyscrapers that stand at least 200 feet (61 m) tall, based on standard height measurement. This includes spires and architectural details but does not include antenna masts. Existing structures are included for ranking purposes based on present height.

Rank	Name	Image	Height ft / m	Floors	Year	Notes
1	Innovation Square		443 / 135	30	1968	Formerly known as Xerox Tower. Third tallest building in New York outside of New York City
2	Legacy Tower		401 / 122	20	1995	Formerly known as Bausch & Lomb Place. Only the spire makes it taller than The Metropolitan
3	The Metropolitan		392 / 119	27	1973	Formerly known as Chase Tower and Lincoln First Bank, renamed and partially converted to residential.
4	Kodak Tower		360 / 110	19	1914	Expanded in 1930 from 16 to 19 stories. Tallest building in Upstate New York 1914–1925. Alternatively known as Kodak Office Tower Building 7
5	First Federal Plaza		309 / 94	21	1976	
6	Five Star Bank Plaza		284 / 87	21	1970	Formerly known as One HSBC Plaza and Marine Midland Plaza
7	Hyatt Regency Hotel		271 / 83	25	1990	
8	Andrews Terrace Apartments		269 / 82	24	1975	
9	Times Square Building		260 / 79	14	1930	Originally the Genesee Valley Trust Building
11	Tower 280		251 / 77	18	1962 / 2015	Once part of Midtown Plaza. Refitted into offices and residential units
10	Saint Michael's Church		256 / 78	1	1890	
12	Midtown Manor Apartments		236 / 72 (estimated)	21	1973	
13	Temple Building		218 / 66	14	1925	
14	Crossroads Building	Upload image	215 / 66	15	1969	
15	Eastman School of Music Student Living Center		213 / 65	14	1990	
16	Seneca Towers Apartments	Upload image	212 / 65	22	1968	
17	Sibley's, Lindsay and Curr Building		203 / 62	12	1926	
18	Clinton Square Building		200 / 61	14	1990	

== Tallest proposed, approved, under construction, or cancelled ==
This lists buildings that are under construction, approved for construction or proposed for construction in Rochester and are planned to rise at least 250 feet (76 m), but are not yet completed structures. Under construction buildings that have already been topped out are also included.

The demolition of Midtown Plaza was completed in 2011. Paetec was bought by Windstream and they housed their regional offices in a renovated 3 story portion of the former Seneca Building, rather than build a new tower.

Name	Height* ft / m	Floors*	Year* (est.)	Status	Notes
Paetec Tower	722 feet (220 m) (Estimated)	40	2012	Cancelled	
Midtown Lofts	236 feet (72 m) (Estimated)	13	2018	Cancelled	Was going to be connected to the cancelled Golisano Center For Performing Arts.

== Timeline of tallest buildings ==
Name	Years as tallest	Height ft / m	Floors
Powers Building	1869–1890	165 / 50	9
Saint Michael's Church	1890–1914	246 / 75	1
Kodak Tower	1914–1968	360 / 110	19
Innovation Square	1968-	443 / 135	30

== Notes ==
A. New York has 206 existing and under construction buildings over 500 feet (152 m), Chicago has 107, Miami has 37, Houston has 30, Los Angeles has 22, Dallas has 19, Atlanta has 19, San Francisco has 18, Las Vegas has 17, Boston has 16, Seattle has 14, Philadelphia has 10, Pittsburgh has 10, Jersey City has 9, Minneapolis has 9, Denver has 8, Detroit has 7, Charlotte has 6 and Columbus has 5. Cleveland, New Orleans, Tulsa and Tampa are tied, with 4 each. Source of Skyline ranking information: SkyscraperPage.com: New York, Chicago, Miami, Houston, Los Angeles, Dallas, Atlanta, San Francisco, Las Vegas, Boston, Seattle, Philadelphia, Pittsburgh, Jersey City, Minneapolis, Denver, Detroit, Charlotte, Columbus, Tulsa, Cleveland, New Orleans, and Tampa.

== See also ==
- List of tallest buildings in Upstate New York
