= Innovation Square =

Skyscraper in Rochester, New York

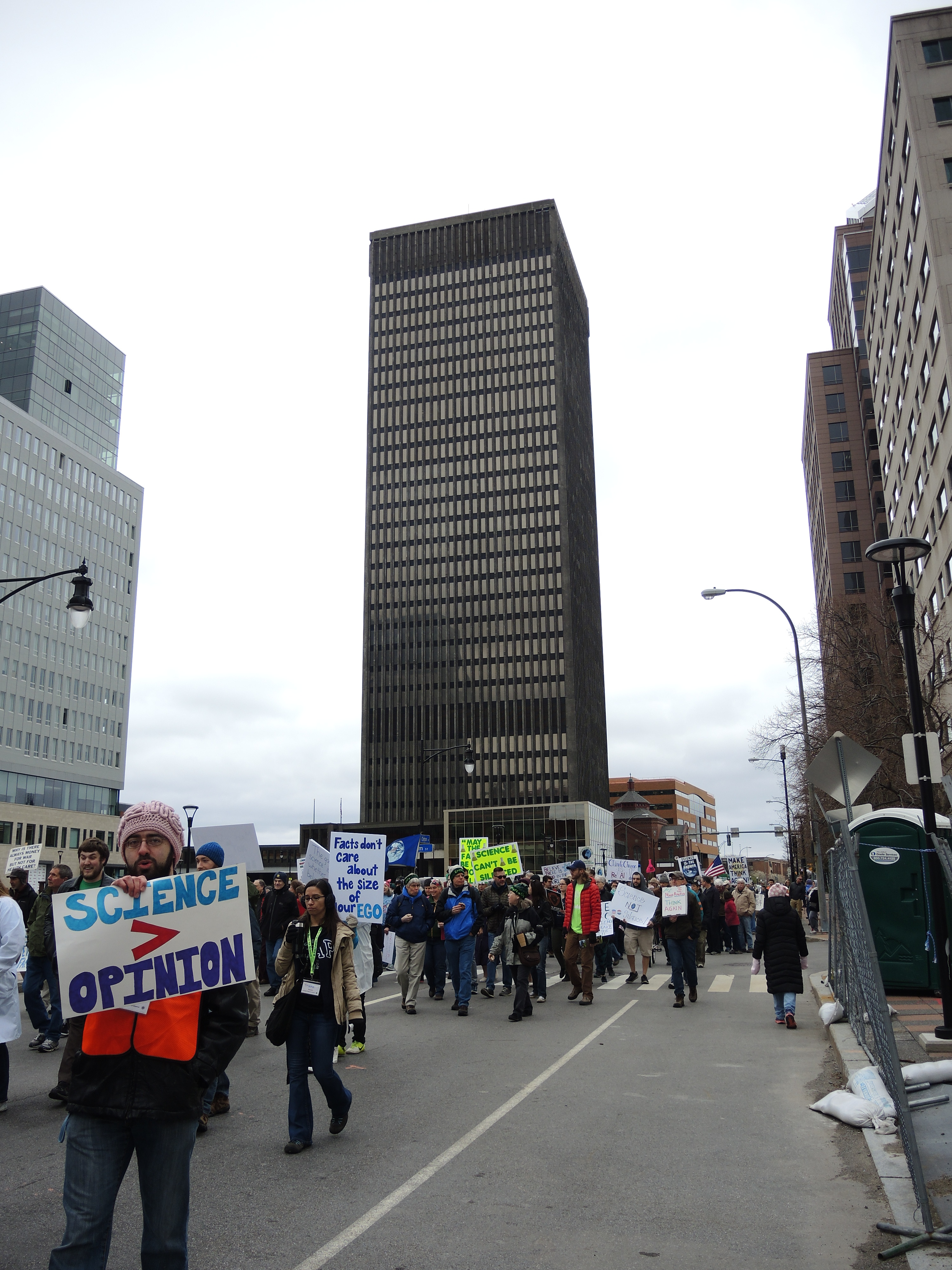
- Former names: Xerox Square

Record height
- Tallest in Rochester, New York since 1967^{[I]}
- Preceded by: Kodak Tower

General information
- Type: Office, Residential, and College Dormitories
- Location: 100 Clinton Avenue South; Rochester, New York
- Coordinates: 43.15455°N 77.60477°W
- Current tenants: Innovation Square
- Construction started: June 28, 1965
- Completed: 1967
- Opening: 1968 (As Xerox Tower) Summer 2021 (As Innovation Square)
- Cost: US$27 million
- Owner: Gallina Development
- Operator: Gallina Development

Height
- Top floor: 443 feet (135 m)

Technical details
- Floor count: 30
- Floor area: 519,994 square feet (48,309.0 m^{2})

Design and construction
- Architects: Welton Becket and Associates
- Developer: Central City Holding Corporation, Weidlinger Associates, Inc., Joseph R. Loring & Associates, Raisler Corporation
- Main contractor: Turner Construction Company

Website
- Official Website

Innovation Square, formerly Xerox Tower, is a skyscraper in downtown Rochester, New York, standing at 443 feet (135 m) tall. The tower is the centerpiece of a roughly 2.7 acres (1.1 ha) complex named Xerox Square. When it was built in 1967, it was the tallest building made of poured-in-place exposed aggregate concrete. It is the tallest building in Rochester, as well as the third tallest building in Upstate New York. It was initially used as the headquarters of Xerox Corporation.

The "Digital X" Xerox logo at the top of the building was removed in 2005 with Xerox's new positioning away from "The Document Company" signature and the related logo in use since 1994.

On April 18, 2009, Xerox announced their wish to sell the tower and other buildings in Xerox Square, and lease back the office space. In August 2013 the property was sold to Buckingham Properties for $40 million. Under the terms of the sale Xerox continued to lease space in the building for eight years, with an option to renew. Between the Summer and Autumn of 2015, a multi-color light display was added to all four corners of the tower roof.

The complex formerly featured an outdoor skating rink, and an English pub-style restaurant called The Shakespeare, both of which operated until the late 1970s or 1980s before being converted to a private outdoor lounge for Xerox employees.

On January 26, 2018, Xerox has announced that it would vacate the entire building to move all its local employees to Webster.

Consulting and accounting firm EFPR was the first commercial tenant in February 2020, occupying the 14th and 15th floors of the tower.

More recently, it was sold to Gallina Development. Gallina announced that it would rename the complex "Innovation Square" and retrofit it with housing, commercial, and college student living space. The auditorium (formerly known as Xerox Auditorium), which was kept, reopened as a performing arts center in September 2021. In 2023, the YMCA opened a branch in the building.

== Gallery ==
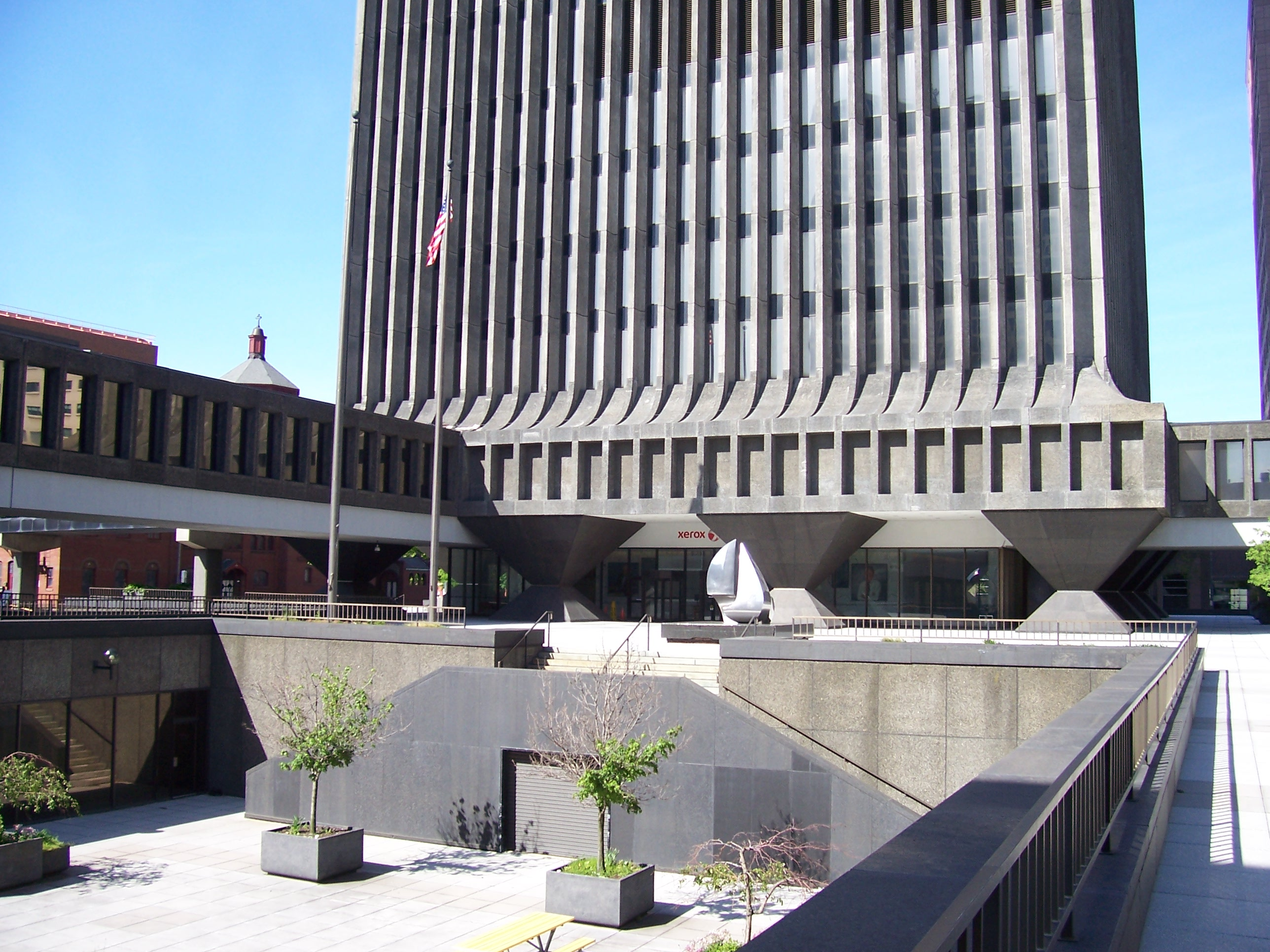
East entrance, showing plaza

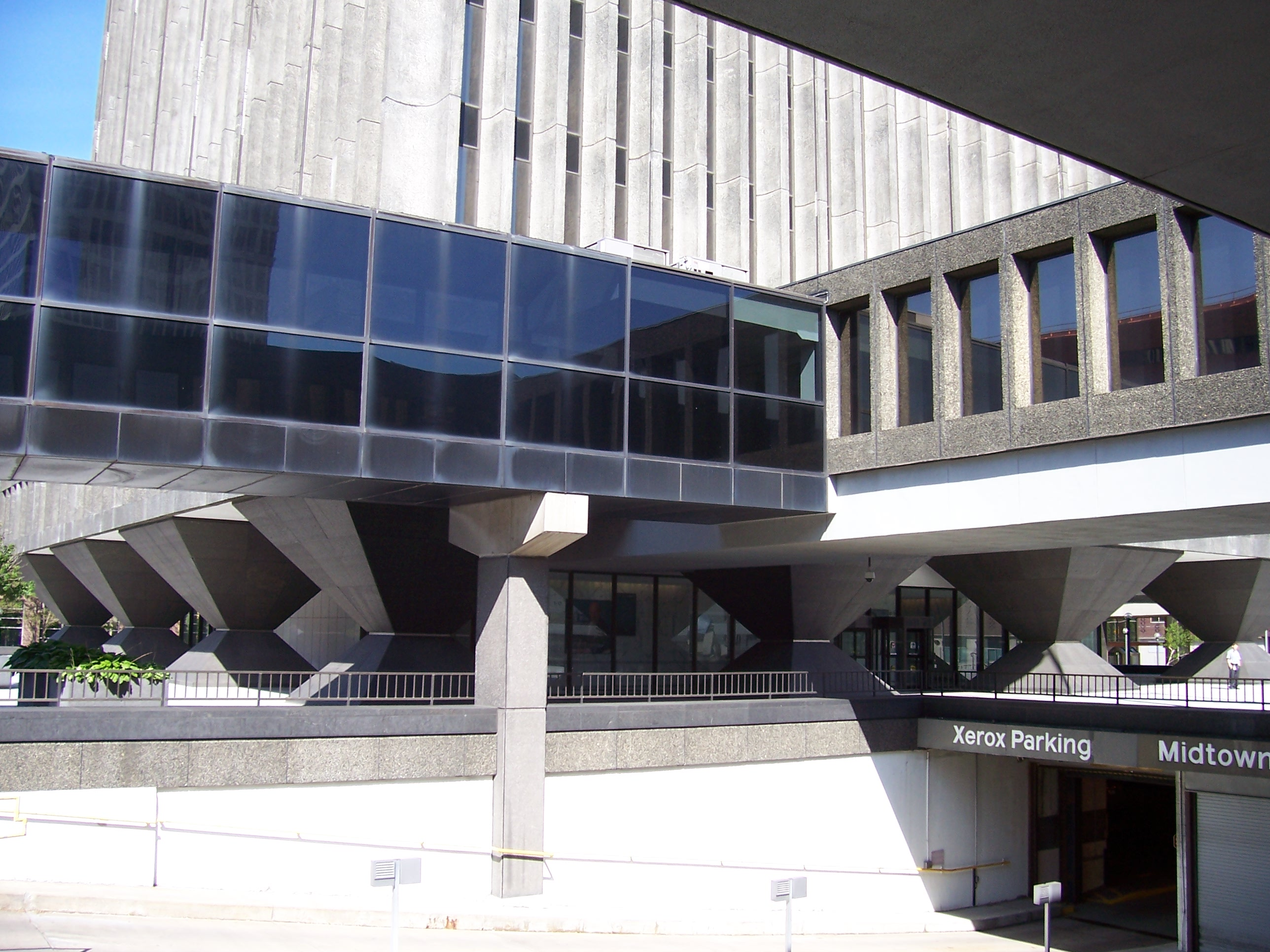
Parking garage entrance

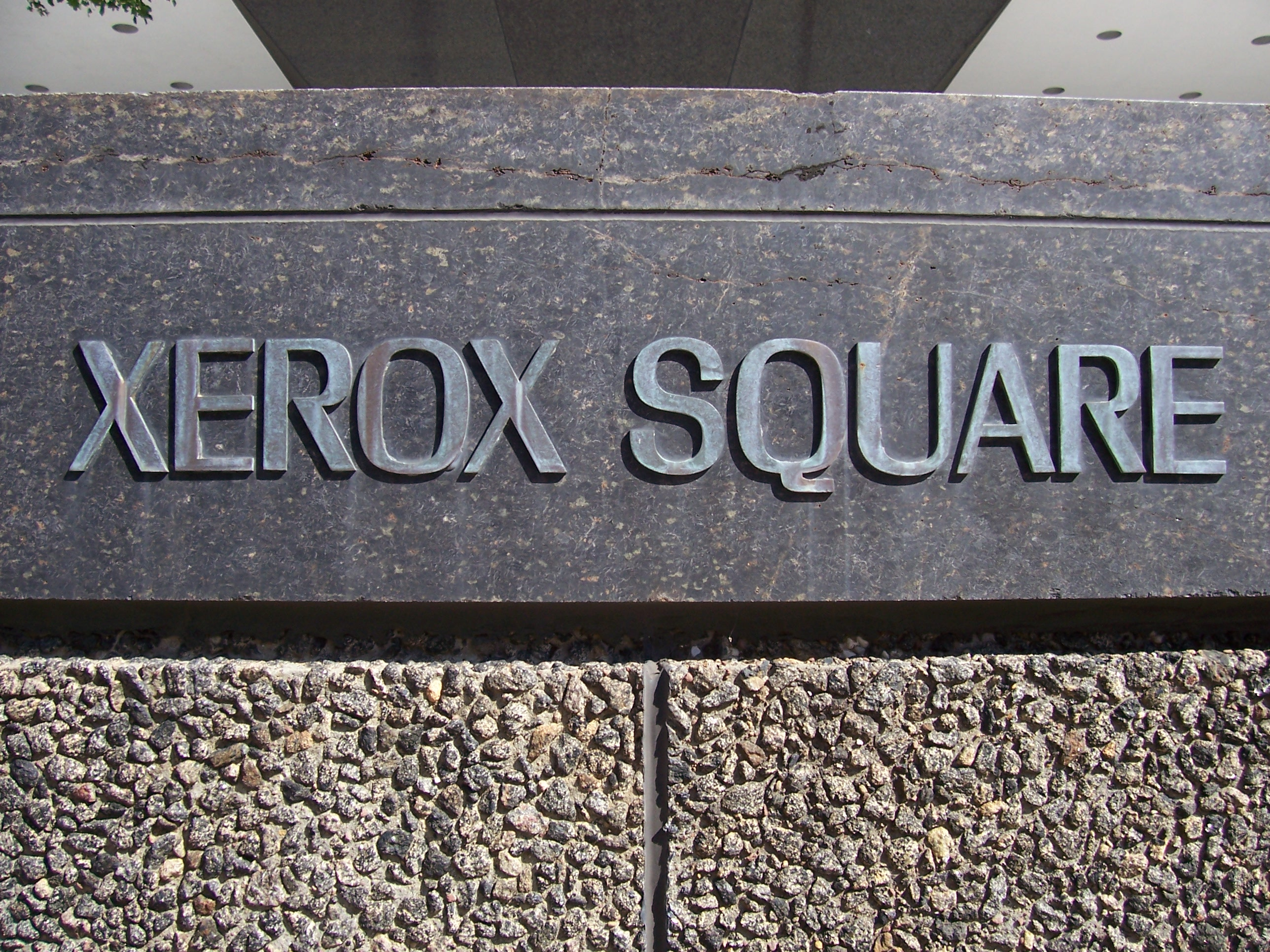
Plaque before it became Innovation Square

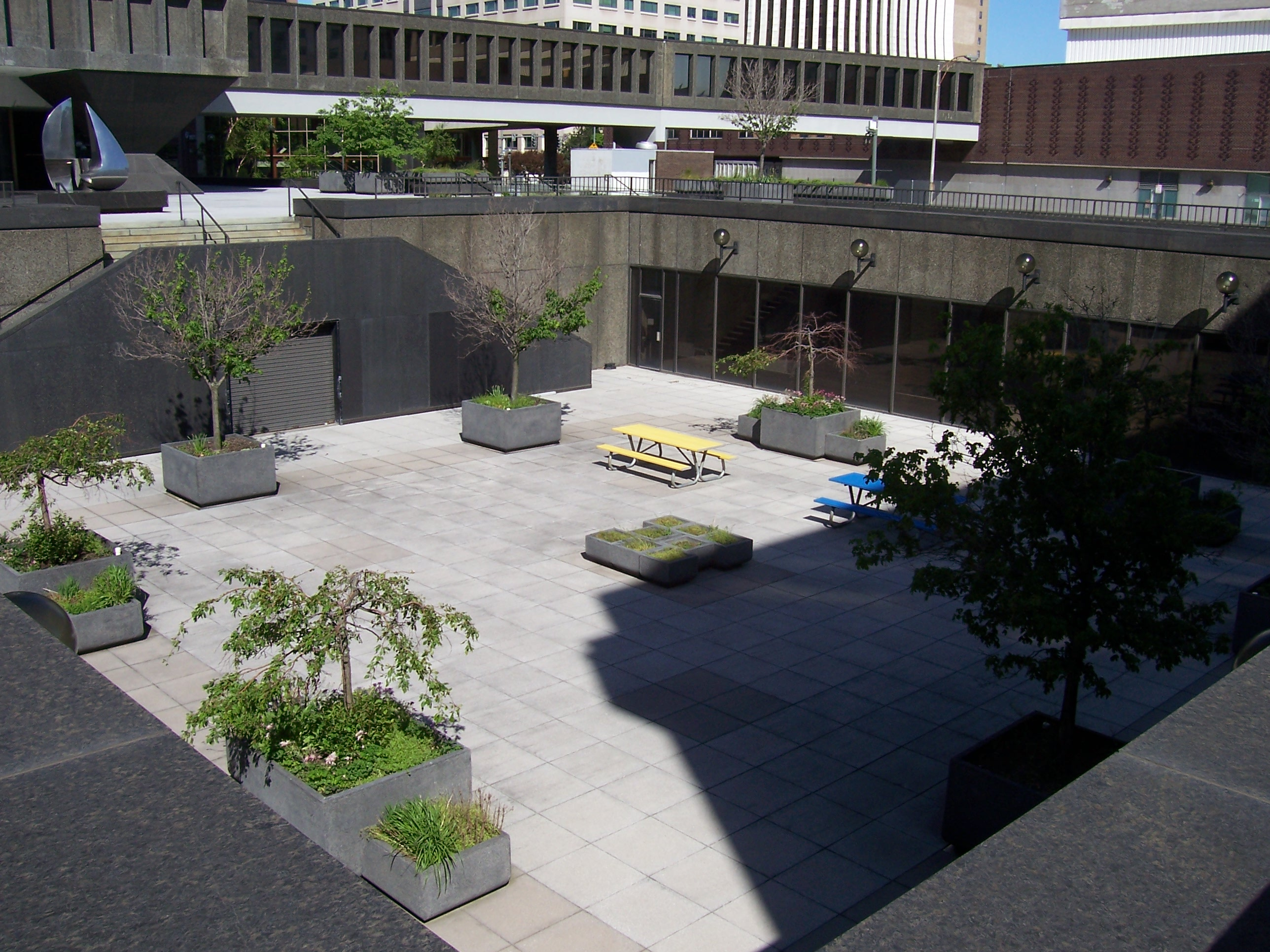
Plaza. Formerly an ice skating rink

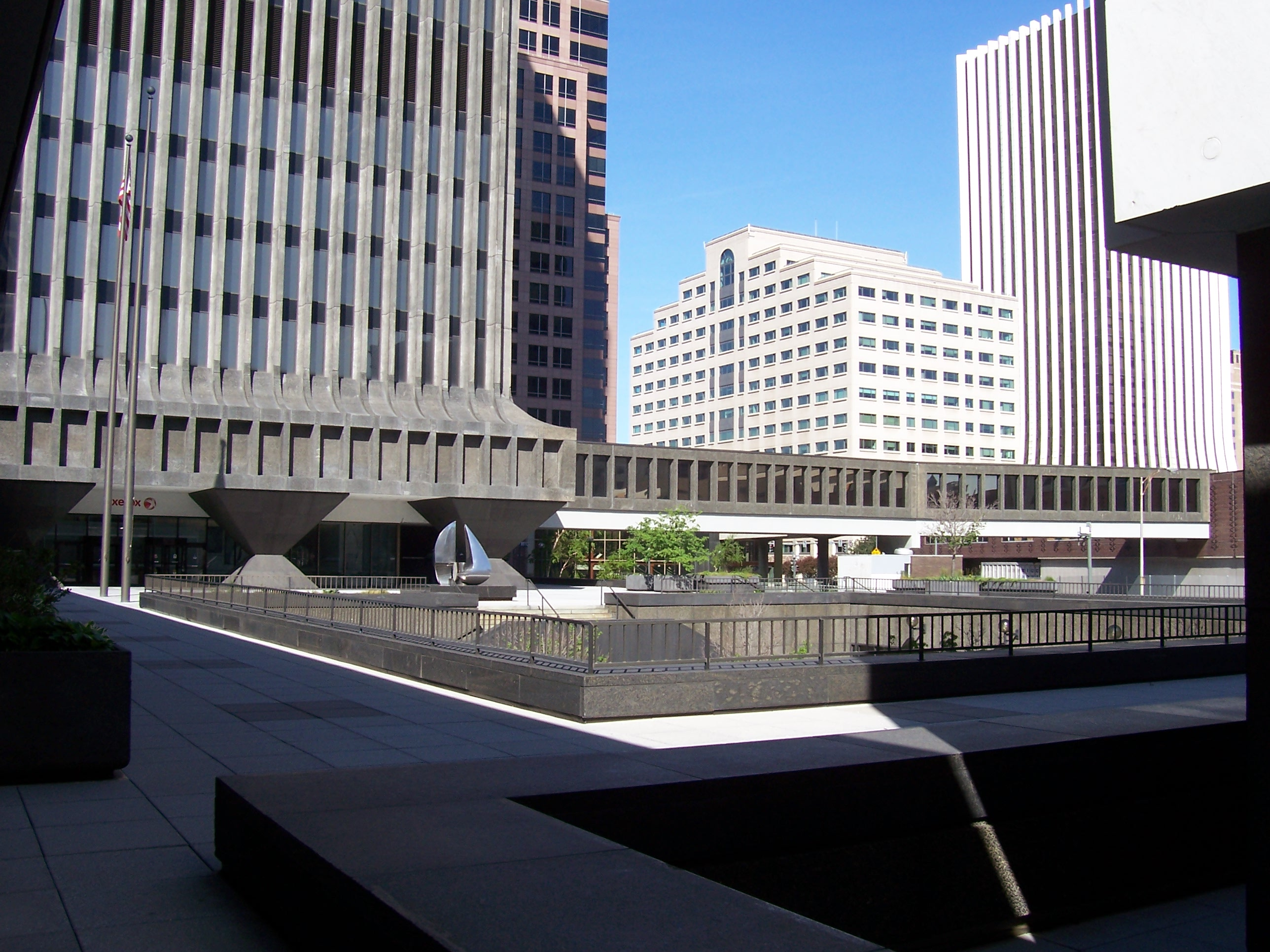
Former skyway to the former Midtown Plaza

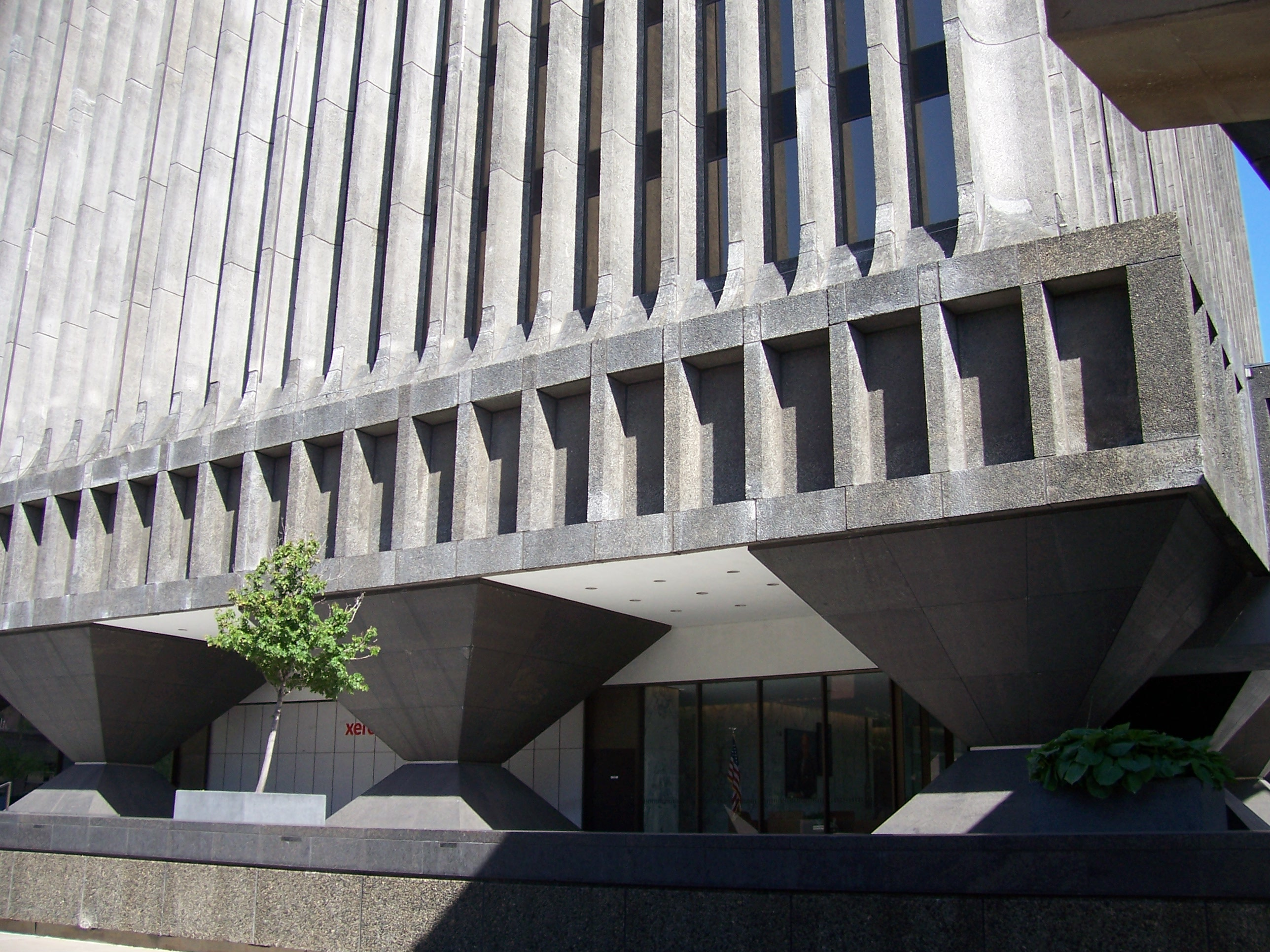
Base

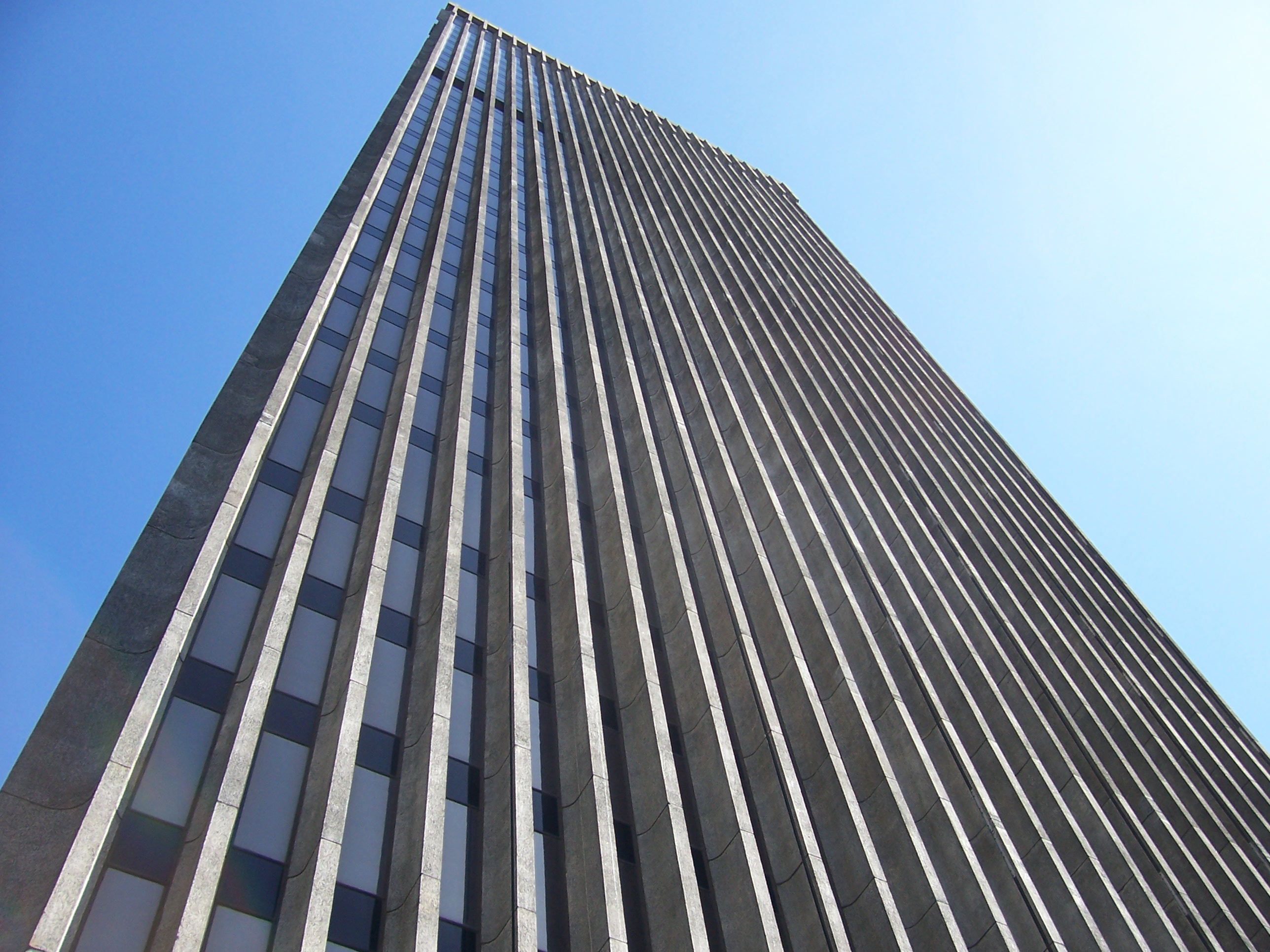
Façade, south side

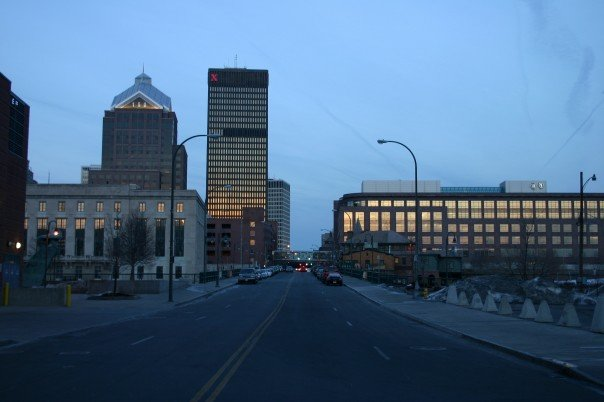
Xerox Tower before the "X" was removed

Records
Preceded by Kodak Tower	Tallest building in Rochester, NY; 443 feet (135 m); 1968–present	Succeeded by Incumbent
