= List of people from Rochester, New York =

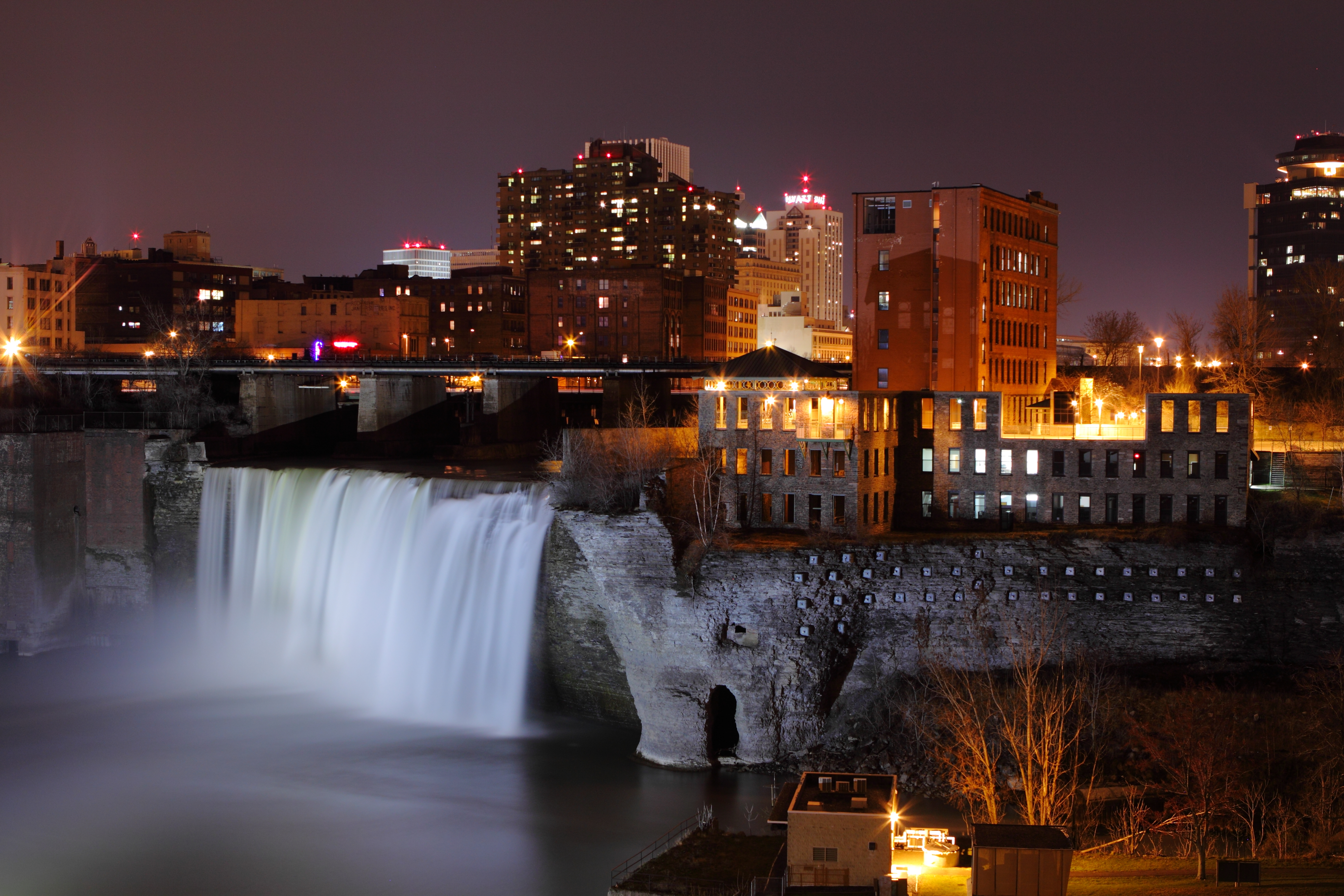
Downtown Rochester

Rochester, New York in the United States, and its suburbs, is or has been home to many famous individuals. They include businessmen, civil rights activists, politicians, entertainers, educators, and athletes. Prominent Rochesterians in the national consciousness include abolitionist Frederick Douglass, suffragist Susan B. Anthony, and inventor-philanthropist George Eastman.

== Academics ==
- Martin Brewer Anderson, first president of University of Rochester
- Richard N. Aslin, developmental psychologist at the University of Rochester
- Dave Bayer (b. 1955), mathematician at Barnard College, Columbia University
- Boris Bittker, legal academic
- Catherine Crary (1909–1974), historian of the American Revolution
- Harry Gideonse (1901–1985), president of Brooklyn College, and chancellor of the New School for Social Research
- Willie Gilchrist, chancellor of Elizabeth City State University
- Hilda Conrady Kingslake, optics engineer
- Rudolf Kingslake, optics engineer
- Sylvy Kornberg (1917–1986), biochemist who discovered and characterized polyphosphate kinase
- Joy Ladin, professor, poet, and theologian
- Edgar Lane (1923–1964), professor of political science
- Michael A. Marletta, biochemist, MacArthur Fellow, former CEO of Scripps Research Institute
- E. C. Mills, educator
- H. Allen Orr, evolutionary biologist, winner of the Darwin-Wallace Medal
- Robert Putnam, Harvard professor
- Richard W. Rahn, economist
- Kenneth Rogoff, Harvard professor
- Joel Seligman, former president of the University of Rochester
- Eugene H. Spafford, Purdue University professor
- Ching W. Tang, 2011 recipient of the Wolf Prize in Chemistry
- Carroll L. Wilson, MIT professor and first General Manager of the U.S. Atomic Energy Commission, recipient of the Tyler Prize for Environmental Achievement
- Robert E. Wright, Nef Family Chair of Political Economy, Augustana College, South Dakota

== Architects and designers ==
- Thomas Wilson Boyde Jr., architect
- Claude Fayette Bragdon, architect
- Harvey Ellis, architect
- Robert Trent Jones, golf course architect
- Ramón Santiago, artist
- Fletcher Steele, landscape designer
- Clarence Stein, urban planner, architect and writer who advocated for the Garden City Movement
- John Rochester Thomas, architect
- Andrew Jackson Warner, architect
- J. Foster Warner, architect

== Athletes ==
Like most cities, Rochester has its share of famous athletes. Among the biggest names are Walter Hagen in golf, Johnny Antonelli in baseball, Brian Gionta and Ryan Callahan in hockey, Abby Wambach in soccer, and Jon "Bones" Jones in mixed martial arts.

=== Baseball ===
- Johnny Antonelli, MLB
- Ross Barnes, hit the first recorded home run in professional baseball
- Bernie Boland
- Chris Bostick, Indianapolis Indians, Pittsburgh Pirates
- Ernie Clement, Utility player for the Cleveland Guardians and Toronto Blue Jays
- Cito Culver, 2010 first-round draft pick
- Heinie Groh, MLB
- Mike Jones, MLB
- Bob Keegan, MLB
- Michael King, pitcher for the New York Yankees and San Diego Padres
- Danny Mendick, infielder for the Chicago White Sox
- Andy Parrino, MLB
- Charley Radbourn, MLB
- Tim Redding, MLB
- George Selkirk, MLB

=== Basketball ===
- Joe Arlauckas
- Joe Binion
- Thomas Bryant, NBA
- Al Butler, NBA
- Marty Byrnes, NBA
- Emma Cannon, WNBA
- Al Cervi, NBA player and coach
- Les Harrison, NBA player and coach
- Mark Jones, NBA
- Anthony Lamb, NBA
- Jack Leasure
- Art Long, NBA
- Mauro Panaggio
- Ryan Pettinella
- Robert Rose, NBA and NBL (Australia) player; won the NBL MVP award (1993, 2001), NBL champion 1992
- Isaiah Stewart, NBA
- Jeff Van Gundy, NBA coach
- Stan Van Gundy, NBA coach
- Bernie Voorheis, NBL
- John Wallace, NBA
- Nate Williams, NBA

=== Combat sports ===
- Carmen Basilio, champion boxer
- Yianni Diakomihalis, folkstyle and freestyle wrestler, four-time NCAA wrestling champion at Cornell, 2022 World silver medalist
- Gregor Gillespie, lightweight fighter in the UFC, also known as "The Gift"
- Desmond Green, featherweight fighter in UFC
- Jon "Bones" Jones, former UFC Light Heavyweight Champion, former UFC Heavyweight Champion
- Willie Monroe, Jr., middleweight boxer
- Charles "The Natural" Murray, light welterweight boxer
- Hanna Thompson, fencer, 2008 Olympic silver medalist (team foil)
- Frank Trigg, welterweight fighter in the UFC
- Bobby Weaver, freestyle wrestler, 1984 Olympic gold medalist
- Felicia Zimmerman, fencer, 1996 and 2000 Olympics
- Iris Zimmerman, fencer, 2000 Olympics

==== Professional wrestling ====
- Johnny Barend
- Dalton Castle
- Colin Delaney, WWE
- Jonathan Huber, ring names Luke Harper and Brodie Lee
- Joanie "Chyna" Laurer
- Gorilla Monsoon
- The Roadblock

=== Football ===
- Branden Albert, NFL
- Joe Bachmaier, NFL
- Kevin Concepcion, Kevin Concepcion
- Cris Crissy, NFL
- Don Davey, NFL
- Greg Dortch, NFL
- Quentin Gause, NFL
- Tony Green, NFL
- Don Holleder, West Point football star and Vietnam War hero
- Ernest Jackson, CFL
- T. J. Jackson, NFL
- Arthur Jones, NFL
- Chandler Jones, NFL
- Tony Jordan, NFL
- Jim Kane, NFL
- Pat Kelly, NFL
- Rob Konrad, NFL
- Brian Kozlowski, NFL
- Leo Lyons, founder of the NFL's Rochester Jeffersons
- Kevin McMahan, NFL
- Seth Payne, NFL (Victor)
- Adam Podlesh, NFL
- Ryan Poles, NFL
- A. J. Terrell, NFL
- Robert R. Thomas, chief justice of the Supreme Court of Illinois and former NFL player
- David Walker, NCAA coach
- Roland Williams, NFL
- Marcus Wilson, NFL
- Alan Zemaitis, NFL

=== Golf ===
- Don Allen, championship amateur golfer
- Terry Diehl, PGA Tour
- Danielle Downey, LPGA player
- Walter Hagen, PGA legend
- Calvin Peete, African-American PGA Tour pioneer
- Jeff Sluman, PGA Tour and Champions Tour
- Sam Urzetta, 1950 U.S. Amateur Champion and professional golfer

=== Hockey ===
- Scott Bartlett, ECHL
- Mike Battaglia, ECHL
- Jason Bonsignore, NHL
- Ryan Callahan, NHL
- Adam Clendening, NHL
- Chris Collins, AHL
- Dan Conway, floor hockey professional, retired
- David Farrance, NHL
- Rory Fitzpatrick, NHL
- Brian Gionta, NHL
- Stephen Gionta, NHL
- Kim Insalaco, Olympic medalist
- Connor Knapp, NHL
- Matt Lane
- Phil Lane, AHL, EURO
- Shane Prince, NHL
- Marty Reasoner, NHL
- David Shields, AHL
- Francis Spain, 1936 Winter Olympic bronze medalist
- Lyndsay Wall, Olympic medalist
- Derek Whitmore, NHL
- Haley Winn, PWHL

=== Lacrosse ===
- Paul Cantabene
- Grant Catalino, MLL
- Dan Conway, Greece Athena HS, retired
- Pat Cougevan, NLL
- Sean Doyle, MLL
- Shawn Nadelen, NLL and MLL
- Brett Queener, NLL and MLL
- Chris Schiller, NLL and MLL
- Tim Soudan
- Joe Walters, NLL and MLL

=== Soccer ===
- Jordan Allen, midfielder
- Brian Bliss, defender and coach
- Mike Britton, defender/midfielder and coach
- Dema Kovalenko, midfielder
- Kathryn Nesbitt, assistant referee
- Angelo Panzetta, defender and coach
- Mike Reidy, midfielder/forward
- Dave Sarachan, forward and coach
- Lydia Vandenbergh, midfielder

=== Swimming and diving ===
- Kara Lynn Joyce, Olympic medalist
- Ryan Lochte, 11-time Olympic medalist
- Richard Saeger, 1984 Olympic gold medalist
- Vincent Ward, Paralympic medalist
- Wendy Wyland, 1984 Olympic medalist, diving

=== Other athletes ===
- Kim Batten, track and field, 1996 Olympic silver medalist in triple jump
- Dick Buerkle, athlete, former world-record holder, indoor mile
- Paige Conners, Olympic ice dancer for Israel
- William Cox, athlete, 1924 Olympic medalist
- Irving Crane, billiards, six-time world champion, Billiard Congress of America Hall of Famer
- Louis Fox, 1865 national billiards champion
- Doug Kent, professional bowler, 2006–07 PBA Player of the Year
- A.J. Kitt, downhill skier, 1988–98 Olympics
- Jason McElwain, basketball personality
- Elmer Musclow, hall of fame auto racing driver
- Danny Padilla, bodybuilder, "The Giant Killer"
- Stacey Pensgen, figure skater and meteorologist
- Pete Pfitzinger, marathoner, 1984 and 1988 U.S. Olympics
- Frank Ritter Shumway, figure skater
- Mike Sigel, billiards, Billiard Congress of America Hall of Famer
- Jenn Suhr (née Stuczynski), 2012 Olympic gold medalist, pole vault
- Maynard Troyer, NASCAR
- Cathy Turner, Olympic gold medalist, short-track speed skating
- Jason Turner, 2008 Olympic medalist, air pistol
- Elsa von Blumen (Caroline Roosevelt), early endurance cyclist

=== Coaches ===
- Joe Altobelli, baseball manager
- Richard Callaghan, figure skater and coach
- Jason Kinzler, manager of the Seattle Mariners
- Dave Sarachan, soccer player and coach
- Megan Shoniker, college basketball coach

=== Officials ===
- Nick Bremigan, MLB umpire
- Maia Chaka, first black woman hired as NFL official
- Jimmy Debell, NFL official
- Ken Kaiser, MLB baseball umpire
- Bill Klem, umpire in Baseball Hall of Fame; umpired in a record 18 World Series
- Silk O'Loughlin, MLB baseball umpire

=== Executives ===
See #Sports executives, below

=== Broadcasters ===
See #Sport broadcasters, below

== Businessmen ==
Rochester's history of innovation and progress is reflected in the long list of notable businessmen who founded their companies here. Eastman Kodak, Bausch + Lomb, Xerox, Gannett Company, and Western Union all trace their roots to Rochester.

- Charles August, co-founder of Monro Muffler Brake
- John Jacob Bausch, co-founder of Bausch & Lomb
- Thasunda Duckett, CEO of Teachers Insurance and Annuity Association of America and former JPMorgan Chase executive
- Thomas B. Dunn, founder of perfume manufacturer T.B. Dunn, and inventor of Sen-Sen breath candy
- George Eastman, Eastman Kodak founder
- Charles J. Folger, lawyer, jurist and statesman
- Frank Gannett, founder of Gannett newspapers; presidential candidate
- Malcolm Glazer, CEO of First Allied; owner of Tampa Bay Buccaneers and Manchester United
- Kate Gleason, first female mechanical engineer
- Tom Golisano, Paychex founder, philanthropist, gubernatorial candidate; owner of NHL's Buffalo Sabres (2003–2010)
- Martha Matilda Harper, hair care entrepreneur
- Leonard Jerome, financier, "King of Wall Street"; grandfather of Sir Winston Churchill
- David T. Kearns, Xerox CEO and Deputy Secretary of Education
- Henry Lomb, co-founder of Bausch & Lomb
- Ralph Peo, inventor, founder of Frontier Industries, CEO and chairman of Houdaille Industries
- Arthur Rock, venture capitalist
- James Satloff, founder of Liberty Skis
- Hiram Sibley, Western Union co-founder
- Henry A. Strong, Eastman Kodak co-founder and president
- Hulbert Harrington Warner, patent medicine sales
- Don Alonzo Watson, Western Union co-founder
- Robert Wegman, Wegmans Food Markets
- Henry Wells, founder of American Express and co-founder of Wells Fargo
- Joseph C. Wilson, founder of Xerox Corporation
- Luke Wood, president of Beats Electronics

=== Computing and Internet ===
- Eric Bauman, founder of eBaum's World
- Paul Buchheit, creator of Gmail and AdSense; founder of FriendFeed
- Burnie Burns, co-founder of Rooster Teeth, an online video production company
- Diane Greene, founder of VMware

=== Inventors ===
- William Seward Burroughs I
- Matthew Ewing, carpenter and inventor
- Marcian E. Hoff, Jr., inventor of the microprocessor
- James Caleb Jackson, Granula
- Daniel Myron LeFever, gun maker and inventor of the hammerless shotgun
- C. J. Rapp, Jolt Cola
- John Samuel Rowell, agricultural inventor and manufacturing industrialist
- Steve Sasson, demonstrated first digital electronic camera
- George B. Selden, automotive pioneer
- S. Donald Stookey, inventor of CorningWare

=== Sports executives ===
- Steve Donner, hockey
- Bryan Glazer, part owner of the Tampa Bay Buccaneers and Manchester United F.C.
- Kim Pegula, co-owner and president, Buffalo Sabres, Buffalo Bills, Buffalo Bandits, Rochester Americans
- Morrie Silver, minor-league baseball

== Criminals (suspected or convicted) ==
- The Alphabet Killer, cold case
- Kenneth Bianchi, one of the Hillside Stranglers
- Angelo Buono, Jr., one of the Hillside Stranglers
- Joseph Naso, serial killer
- Arthur Shawcross, serial killer
- Francis Tumblety, one of the Jack the Ripper suspects

== Entertainers ==
=== Actors and models ===
- Tyson Beckford, fashion model and television personality
- John Bolton, actor, A Christmas Story: The Musical
- Pandora Boxx, drag queen, Rupaul's Drag Race Season 2, All Stars 1, All Stars 6
- Peter Breck, actor, The Big Valley Western series, Thunder Road movie, guest starred in many TV shows and acted in theater productions
- Louise Brooks, actress of 1920s and 30s, essayist of the 1960s and 70s
- Burnie Burns, voice actor, Red Vs. Blue; co-founder of Rooster Teeth
- Donna Lynne Champlin, Broadway actress
- Julie Lynn Cialini, Playboy model
- Jordan Clarke, actor, Guiding Light
- Jennifer Cody, dancer and actress
- Mrs. Kasha Davis, drag queen, Rupaul's Drag Race season 7
- Taye Diggs, actor, Rent, Private Practice
- Pete Duel, actor, Alias Smith and Jones
- Winston Duke, actor, Black Panther
- Marilyn Erskine, actress
- Dan Finnerty, singer and actor
- Nicole Fiscella, actress, Gossip Girl
- Robert Forster, Oscar-nominated actor, Jackie Brown
- Susan Gibney, actress, Crossing Jordan
- Rachel Hilbert, model, Victoria's Secret
- Che Holloway, actor, Dark Justice
- Philip Seymour Hoffman, Oscar-winning actor
- Tom Keene, western actor
- Mimi Kennedy, actress and activist
- Norman Kerry, silent film actor
- Darienne Lake, drag queen, Rupaul's Drag Race season 6
- Hudson Leick, actress, Xena: Warrior Princess
- Kara Lindsay, actress, Newsies
- John Lithgow, Oscar, Tony and Emmy-nominated actor
- Rick Lyon, Broadway puppeteer and puppet designer
- Ann Mahoney, actress, The Walking Dead, Olivia
- Vincent Martella, actor, Everybody Hates Chris, Phineas and Ferb
- Timothy Mitchum, actor, The Lion King
- Audrey Munson, early 20th-century model
- Paul Napier, television and commercial actor, SAG leader
- Hugh O'Brian, actor, films and Wyatt Earp television series
- Michael Park, actor, As the World Turns
- Chris Perfetti, actor, Abbott Elementary
- Richard Ryder, actor, Forever Young
- Keesha Sharp, actress, director
- Brennan Swain, contestant, The Amazing Race
- Joy Tanner, actress
- Tom Villard, actor, We Got it Made
- Gloria Votsis, actress
- Jimmy Wallington, actor and radio personality
- Kristen Wiig, comedian and actress, Saturday Night Live

=== Comedians ===
- Jenna Marbles
- Foster Brooks
- Jay Jason
- Pete Correale

=== Dancers and choreographers ===
- Aesha Ash, ballet dancer
- Garth Fagan, choreographer, considers Rochester home base
- Sybil Shearer

=== Musicians ===
==== Classical music ====
- David Diamond, composer
- Renée Fleming, soprano
- Adolphus Hailstork, composer
- Howard Hanson, composer and conductor
- David Hochstein, virtuoso violinist
- Claire Huangci, pianist
- Daniel Katzen
- Gregory Kunde, tenor
- Ward Stare, conductor and trombonist
- Jeff Tyzik, conductor and jazz trumpeter
- William Warfield, bass-baritone
- Alec Wilder, composer
- Zvi Zeitlin, violinist and teacher

==== Jazz, big bands, and blues ====
- Cab Calloway, bandleader
- Chet Catallo, guitarist, Spyro Gyra, Chet Catallo and the Cats
- Hank D'Amico, clarinetist
- JT Bowen, R&B singer
- Steve Gadd, drummer
- Michael Hashim, saxophonist
- Son House, bluesman
- Vijay Iyer, jazz pianist
- Nancy Kelly, jazz singer
- Chuck Mangione, smooth jazz flugelhornist
- Gap Mangione, bandleader
- Roy McCurdy, drummer
- Mitch Miller, bandleader
- John Mooney, Bluesiana
- Famoudou Don Moye, drummer, Art Ensemble of Chicago
- Gerry Niewood, saxophonist
- Joe Romano, jazz saxophonist
- Frank Strazzeri, jazz pianist
- John Viavattine, Mambo Kings

==== Popular music ====
Lou Gramm, lead singer of Foreigner, and Gene Cornish of The Rascals might be the best-known pop musicians from Rochester. Gary Lewis (of Gary Lewis and the Playboys) came to the area late in life but now calls it home. Notable bands whose members are largely or entirely Rochesterians include Gym Class Heroes, Joywave, Rustix, SNMNMNM, and The Sunstreak. In 2024, RXK Nephew was recognized by Pitchfork for his song "American TTerroristt" (2020), which ranked #2 on the list of "The Hundred Best Songs of the 2020s So Far".

- Steve Alaimo, teen idol pop singer, hosted and co-produced Dick Clark's Where the Action Is
- Gene Cornish, The Rascals
- Brann Dailor, Mastodon
- Steve Decker, Gym Class Heroes
- Joe English, drummer for Wings and Sea Level
- Teddy Geiger
- Kim Gordon, Sonic Youth
- Lou Gramm, Foreigner
- DJ Green Lantern, rapper
- Mick Guzauski, mixer
- Davey Havok, AFI and Blaqk Audio
- Peter Hughes, former bassist of the Mountain Goats
- Duke Jupiter
- Bill Kelliher, Mastodon
- Gary Lewis, Gary Lewis and the Playboys
- Disashi Lumumba-Kasongo, Gym Class Heroes (From nearby Ithaca, NY)
- Lydia Lunch
- Travis McCoy, Gym Class Heroes (From nearby Geneva, NY)
- Matt McGinley, Gym Class Heroes (From nearby Geneva, NY)
- Bob Nastanovich, Pavement
- RXK Nephew, rapper
- Mike Piano, The Sandpipers
- Danielle Ponder
- Don Potter
- Bobby Orlando, producer
- Emilio Rojas, rapper
- Peter Shukoff ("NicePeter")
- Joyce Sims
- Jacob Stanczak, better known as Kill the Noise, Disk Jockey and producer
- William Tell, Something Corporate
- Tweet, born Charlene Keys
- Virus, aka Andre Karkos, Device, Big & Rich, Dope, Lords of Acid
- Leehom Wang, C-pop
- Wendy O. Williams, Plasmatics
- Tim Yeung, Divine Heresy, Morbid Angel

==== Others ====
- Rick Beato, musician, music educator, YouTuber
- Robert Bernhardt, symphony conductor
- The Campbell Brothers, instrumental gospel quartet
- James Ferraro, musician
- Thomas Keene, folk singer/Bloomberg radio host
- Christine Lavin, folk singer/songwriter
- Julia Nunes, folk ukelelist and singer/songwriter
- Lauren O'Connell, folk singer/songwriter
- Lesley Riddle, 'human tape recorder' during A.P. Carter's song collecting excursions
- Wooli, DJ and electronic music producer

=== Other ===
- Raul daSilva, author, filmmaker
- Thérèse DePrez, production designer
- Andrea Nix Fine, Oscar-winning documentary producer, Inocente
- Jason Hawes, founder of the Atlantic Paranormal Society and Sci Fi Channel series Ghost Hunters
- Jenna Mourey, YouTube personality, screen name "Jenna Marbles"
- Jim Pabian, animator
- Andrew Rea, YouTuber and chef
- James Sibley Watson, doctor and filmmaker

== Government ==
=== Politicians and leaders ===
- Parmenio Adams, U.S. representative
- Nathaniel Allen, U.S. representative
- Fernando C. Beaman, U.S. representative
- Charles Billinghurst, U.S. representative from Wisconsin
- Harmon P. Burroughs, Illinois state representative
- Angus Cameron, U.S. senator from Wisconsin
- Sanford E. Church, lieutenant governor of New York, New York State Comptroller, and Chief Judge of New York State Court of Appeals
- Edward Colman, Wisconsin state senator
- Cornplanter, leader of the Seneca
- Robert Duffy, former Rochester police Chief, Rochester's 65th mayor, NYS lieutenant governor, president and CEO of the Greater Rochester Chamber of Commerce
- Marion B. Folsom, Secretary of Health, Education and Welfare
- John Rankin Gamble, U.S. representative from South Dakota
- John W. Gunning, Wisconsin state assemblyman
- Leopold Hammel, Wisconsin state assemblyman
- Elizur K. Hart, U.S. representative and founder of Rochester Post-Express newspaper
- David J. Hayes, Deputy Secretary of the Interior
- Charles H. Holmes, U.S. representative
- Kenneth Keating, U.S. representative, senator, and ambassador to Israel
- Robert L. King, state assemblyman, county executive, and chancellor of the State University of New York
- Brian Kolb, Minority Leader of the New York State Assembly
- Charles H. Nesbitt, assemblyman and assembly minority leader
- Bill Nojay, assemblyman, public authority leader, and radio talk show host
- William F. Quinn, governor of Hawaii
- John Raines, state senator
- Adolph J. Rodenbeck, mayor of Rochester, New York State assemblyman, Court of Claims judge, and New York Supreme Court justice
- Eliakim Sherrill, politician and brigade commander in Union Army during Civil War
- Louise Slaughter, U.S. representative, chairperson of House Rules Committee
- Ellicott R. Stillman, Wisconsin State Assemblyman
- Thomas Benton Stoddard, first mayor of La Crosse, Wisconsin, and state assemblyman
- James W. Symington, chief of protocol of the United States (1966–68) and U.S. representative (1969–77)
- John Todd Trowbridge, Wisconsin territorial legislator and sea captain
- Tom Warner, representative in Florida State Legislature

=== Judges and lawyers ===
- Benjamin Cunningham, Supreme Court justice
- Robert Khuzami, deputy U.S. attorney
- Donald Mark, New York Supreme Court justice
- Robert R. Thomas, chief justice of the Supreme Court of Illinois and former NFL player

=== Military personnel ===
Military personnel best known as astronauts are listed below under "Scientists".

- Brigadier General John F. Albert, deputy chief of chaplains of the U.S. Air Force
- Sgt. Gary B. Beikirch, Medal of Honor-winning combat medic during the Vietnam War
- Major General Joseph L. Biehler, commander of the 42nd Infantry Division
- Corporal Richard Brookins, the "American St. Nick" of World War II
- Pfc. Raymond J. Bowman
- Brigadier General Frank Merrill Caldwell, brigade commander in World War I
- Major General Mary E. Clarke, director of the Women's Army Corps; first woman to attain the rank of major general in the US Army
- Lieutenant Colonel Elmer W Heindl, WWII chaplain
- General Francišak Kušal, commander of the Byelorussian Home Defence
- John S. Lanning (aka John S. Lann), Union Navy sailor and Medal of Honor recipient for his actions in the American Civil War
- Major General Harold J. Lavell, born in Rochester
- George Lennon, Irish Republican Army leader during the Irish War of Independence and the Irish Civil War
- Brigadier General William F. Lynch, born in Rochester
- Major General Daniel McCallum, head of the United States Military Railroad
- Major General William Augustus Mills, served during the defense of the Niagara frontier in the War of 1812
- Colonel Patrick O'Rorke

== Media ==
=== Authors and writers ===
- Isabella Macdonald Alden, author
- John Ashbery, poet
- Natallia Arsiennieva, poet
- Nicholson Baker, author
- Andrea Barrett, short-story writer
- Philip Barry, playwright
- Richard Brookhiser, biographer
- Marcia Brown, Caldecott-winning author
- Rob Byrnes, writer, Lambda Literary Award winner
- Ron Carlivati, head writer of One Life to Live, General Hospital
- Tom Chiarella, writer for Esquire
- Francis Pharcellus Church, publisher and editor
- Henry W. Clune, journalist and novelist
- Sheila Connolly, mystery writer
- Cornelius Eady, poet
- Thomas Fenton, screenwriter, Saw IV
- Edith Willis Linn Forbes, poet and writer
- Joseph Fornieri, historian, political scientist
- Dana Fox, screenwriter, The Wedding Date
- Geoffrey Giuliano, biographer
- Anna Sanborn Hamilton (1848–1927), co-founder, president, League of American Pen Women
- Virginia Haviland, librarian and writer
- Edward D. Hoch, mystery writer
- Mary Jane Holmes, 19th-century author
- Marie Howe, poet
- David Hudson, lawyer and writer
- Charles R. Jackson, author of The Lost Weekend
- Shirley Jackson, author, "The Lottery"
- David Cay Johnston, Pulitzer Prize winner, reporter for New York Times
- Ilya Kaminsky, Ukrainian-American poet
- Garson Kanin, playwright and screenwriter
- Mollie Katzen, chef and cookbook author
- Stanton Davis Kirkham, naturalist
- Michael Muhammad Knight, novelist
- Helen Aldrich De Kroyft (1818–1915), author
- Sonja Livingston, author
- Jerre Mangione, writer
- Minerva Brace Norton, educator and author
- Linda Sue Park, Newbery Medal winner
- Jane Marsh Parker, author, historian and clubwoman
- Herbie J Pilato, writer
- Marjorie Kinnan Rawlings, author, Pulitzer Prize winner for The Yearling
- David Oliver Relin, journalist and author, Three Cups of Tea
- Julia Sauer, librarian and author
- David Schickler, author, Kissing in Manhattan and Sweet and Vicious
- Emma Augusta Sharkey, writer
- Mark Shulman, children's author
- Joe Simon, comic book writer, co-creator of Captain America
- Lura Eugenie Brown Smith (1864–?), journalist, newspaper editor, author
- Thomas Thackeray Swinburne (1865–1926), poet
- Chris Van Etten, TV writer and author
- Amelia Kempshall Wing (1837–1927), author and philanthropist

=== Broadcasters and journalists ===
- Don Alhart, television journalist
- Mark Ames, journalist and podcaster
- Ralph Bown, radio pioneer
- Richard Ben Cramer, journalist and author, Pulitzer Prize winner
- Frederick Douglass, editor of The North Star (anti-slavery newspaper)
- Jean Giambrone, journalist, first woman credentialed for Masters golf
- Sean Lahman, sports statistician and newspaper journalist
- John Machacek, Pulitzer Prize winner (1972, spot reporting)
- Don Martin, Calgary Herald columnist
- Anne Montgomery, WROC sports reporter and ESPN broadcaster
- Henry Jarvis Raymond, journalist and founder of New York Times
- Neil Rogers, radio host
- Martin Sargent, professional "nerd" and host of TWIF
- Steve Scully, C-SPAN host; reporter and anchor at WHEC-TV in Rochester
- Jimmy Wallington, radio personality
- Irv Weinstein, television journalist
- Ken Boddie, television journalist

==== Sport broadcasters ====
- Mike Catalana, Rochester television executive
- Lanny Frattare, Pittsburgh Pirates
- Hank Greenwald, San Francisco Giants
- Josh Lewin, Los Angeles Chargers and Texas Rangers
- Clem McCarthy, sportscaster and newsreel narrator
- Nick Nickson, Jr., Los Angeles Kings
- Bill Stern, sportscaster in National Radio Hall of Fame
- Jeff Van Gundy, pro basketball
- Pete Van Wieren, Atlanta Braves

=== Photographers and artists ===
Metalwork sculptor Albert Paley, although originally from Philadelphia, has lived and worked in Rochester for over four decades; he is probably the region's most prominent artist. Like many other artists, he came to Rochester because of RIT's School for American Crafts.

- Alfred Agate, painter
- Frederick Styles Agate, painter
- Harry Bliss, cartoonist
- Wendell Castle, wood furniture sculptor
- Arthur Dove, abstract painter
- Emil Gruppe, impressionist painter
- Nicholas Gurewitch, creator of The Perry Bible Fellowship
- Peter Hannan, creator of CatDog
- James D. Havens, woodcut artist; early insulin recipient
- Maud Humphrey, commercial illustrator, suffragist; mother of actor Humphrey Bogart
- Jeannette Klute, photographer
- Marilyn Leavitt-Imblum, needlework designer
- Albert Paley, metalwork sculptor
- Manuel Rivera-Ortiz, photographer

=== Other ===
- Larry Ashmead, book editor

== Religion and philosophy ==
- Reverend Francis Bellamy, wrote the Pledge of Allegiance
- Antoinette Brown Blackwell, first female minister
- James Callan, former Catholic priest
- Hiram Edson, pioneer of the Seventh-day Adventist Church
- Kate, Leah, and Margaret Fox, spiritualists
- Philip Kapleau, brought Zen Buddhism to western mainstream 1964; founded Rochester Zen Center
- Max Landsberg (1845–1927), rabbi of B'rith Kodesh
- Bishop Bernard John McQuaid
- Carolyn Merchant, philosopher and historian
- Fridolin Pascalar, pastor at St. Michael's Church (1874–1896)
- Walter Rauschenbusch, theologian
- Abraham Resnick, rabbi in Ashgabat, Kokand, Moscow, Quincy MA, Lowell MA and Rochester
- Benjamin Titus Roberts, founder, Free Methodist Church
- Bishop Fulton Sheen, archbishop and television personality
- Joseph Smith, founder of Latter Day Saint movement
- Paul J. Swain, Roman Catholic bishop
- Reverend Dr. Howard Thurman
- William C. White, Seventh-day Adventist minister

== Scientists ==
Pioneering physician Elizabeth Blackwell, pioneering astronaut Pamela Melroy, and naturalist Henry Augustus Ward are the most notable scientists to come from the Rochester area. Acclaimed surgeon Seymour I. Schwartz also made Rochester his home.

- James C. Adamson, astronaut
- John Auer, physiologist and pharmacologist credited with the discovery of Auer rods
- Elizabeth Blackwell, first woman to become qualified as a medical doctor
- Esther M. Conwell, physicist, 1997 recipient of the IEEE Edison Medal
- Frank J. Duarte, laser physicist and author
- Grove Karl Gilbert, geologist
- David Lipman, bioinformaticist
- Edward Tsang Lu, space shuttle astronaut, International Space Station resident
- Pamela Melroy, astronaut
- Lewis Henry Morgan, anthropologist
- Arthur Caswell Parker, archaeologist, historian, expert on Native Americans, and director of the Rochester Museum of Arts and Sciences
- John Wesley Powell, geologist
- Mark Rosenzweig, research psychologist
- Seymour I. Schwartz, author of Schwartz's Principles of Surgery, the "Surgeon's Bible"
- Lewis A. Swift, astronomer
- Ching W. Tang, chemist, physicist, inventor of OLED
- Henry Augustus Ward, naturalist and geologist, founder of Ward's Natural Science
- John Ralston Williams, medical pioneer
- Carroll L. Wilson, MIT professor and first General Manager of the U.S. Atomic Energy Commission, recipient of the Tyler Prize for Environmental Achievement
- Herbert York, nuclear physicist

== Social reformers ==
No list of notable Rochesterians could ever omit Susan B. Anthony and Frederick Douglass, but the area has a long history of progressive social reformers. Anarchist Emma Goldman lived there for a time.

- Terry A. Anderson, former hostage and humanitarian
- Susan B. Anthony, women's rights leader
- Walter Cooper, research scientist, urban education reformer and civil rights activist
- Frederick Douglass, abolitionist
- Lavantia Densmore Douglass (1827–1899), social reformer
- Emma Goldman, anarchist
- George W. Goler, pioneer in pasteurisation
- Shields Green, escaped slave who participated in John Brown's raid on Harpers Ferry
- Jean Brooks Greenleaf (1832–1918), woman suffragist
- Antoinette Arnold Hawley, temperance activist
- Hester C. Jeffrey, suffragist
- Clarissa Caldwell Lathrop, asylum reform advocate and autobiographer
- Helen Barrett Montgomery, social reformer and women's activist
- Helen Pitts, abolitionist and feminist
- Amy and Isaac Post, abolitionists and women's rights advocates
- Joy Powell, social reformer, political prisoner and anti-violence activist
- Mabel Sine Wadsworth, birth control activist
- Lillian Wald, public health nurse and social worker
- Samuel Ringgold Ward, African-American pastor and abolitionist
- Frances Willard, suffragist and temperance reformer
- Fannie Barrier Williams, black social reformer

== Others ==
- Josh Arieh, 2005 World Series of Poker champion
- Timothy Blodgett, sergeant at arms of the U.S. House of Representatives as of January 2021
- Mabel Boll, socialite, the "Queen of Diamonds"
- Douglas Brei, sports historian
- Obadiah Bush, ancestor of the Bush financial and political family
- Elizabeth Eden, figure in the Dog Day Afternoon bank heist
- Ed Edmondson, chess arbiter
- Jon Finkel, Magic: The Gathering champion
- Jerome Fuller, jurist
- Eugene Genovese, historian
- Mike Goodman, professional gambler, casino pit boss, and author
- Gideon Granger, U.S. Postmaster General under Thomas Jefferson
- Seth Green, pioneer in fish farming
- Mary Jemison, the White Lady of the Genesee
- Lincoln Kirstein, writer, ballet impresario, art connoisseur, and one of the Monuments Men
- Thomas Krens, former director, current senior adviser, at the Solomon R. Guggenheim Museum
- Increase A. Lapham, "father" of the United States Weather Service
- Christopher Lasch, historian
- Belva Ann Lockwood, first female attorney to practice before the Supreme Court
- Shawn Rabideau, event planner, TV personality
- Nathaniel Rochester, city founder
- Blanche Stuart Scott, first American woman aviator
- Jane Teller, sculptor

== Fictional Rochesterians ==
- Luke and Joanne Collins, and son Dennis Collins, Heroes Reborn
- Rosalie Hale, vampire, Twilight
- Scott Hunter, Hockey Player, in Game Changers by Rachel Reid (author) and portrayed in Heated Rivalry the TV Series

== Sources ==
- Bragdon, George Chandler (1902). Notable men of Rochester and vicinity : XIX and XX centuries. Rochester, NY: D.J. Stoddard.
