= McQuaid Jesuit High School =

McQuaid Jesuit

Location
- 1800 South Clinton Avenue; Rochester, Monroe, New York 14618; United States; 43°7′26″N 77°35′33″W

Information
- Type: Private Roman Catholic all-male secondary school
- Motto: Ad majorem Dei gloriam (For the greater glory of God.)
- Religious affiliation: Roman Catholic (Jesuit)
- Patron saint: St. Francis Xavier
- Established: 1954; 72 years ago
- Founder: Society of Jesus
- President: Stephen Salluzzo, '90, P '18
- Chairman: Thomas D'Antonio, P '06, '07, '12
- Dean: Christopher Parks, '90, P '27, '28 and Joe Dugan, '08
- Principal: John Serafine
- Principal: Janet Dacey, P '99, '05, '08
- Faculty: 76.3 (on an FTE basis)
- Key people: Dean of Academics: Dan Hershel Director of Admissions and Enrollment Management: Cory Parker, '13 Assistant to the President: Penny Gonzalez, P '16, P '18 Assistant to the principal: Stacia Parisi Assistant to the Dean of Students: Donna Dawson Vice President of Advancement: Heather Whiting Athletic Directors: Bobby Bates and Shawn Nally, '15 Director of Human Resources: Chris Spinelli, '04 Director of Counseling: John Young Finance Manager/Analyst: Nick Bridenbaugh, '07 Director of Facilities: Paul Humennyj Director of Communications: Casey MacClaren, '12 Vice President of Mission and Ministry: Adam Baber English Department: Christopher Parks Mathematics Department Leader: Kristi Mabelis Science Department Leader: Paul Guadagna Social Studies Department Leader: James Purtell Theology Department Leader: Andrew Hoelperl Fine Arts Department Leader: Kevin Karnisky Director of Technology: Michael Crockett, '14 Robotics Coordinator: Aaron Schnittman Middle School Administrative Assistant: Andrea McLaren Mission and Ministry Administrative Assistant: Annette Weidmann Communications Specialist: Meghan Gleason
- Grades: 6–12
- Gender: Male
- Enrollment: 810 (2019-20)
- Student to teacher ratio: 12.0
- Campus: Suburban 33 acres (13 ha)
- Colors: Black and gold
- Slogan: "Creating Great Men" https://mcquaid.org/
- Athletics conference: NYSPHSAA; Private Parochial
- Mascot: Knightmare
- Nickname: Knights
- Team name: Knights
- Rival: Aquinas Institute
- Accreditation: JSN NYSAIS
- Yearbook: The Accolade
- Website: www.mcquaid.org

McQuaid Jesuit High School is an all-male, Catholic, Jesuit, college preparatory school run by the USA Northeast Jesuit province of the Society of Jesus in the metropolitan area of Rochester, New York. The school is named after Bernard J. McQuaid, the first bishop of the Roman Catholic Diocese of Rochester. McQuaid is located at 1800 Clinton Avenue South, in the suburb of Brighton.

== History ==
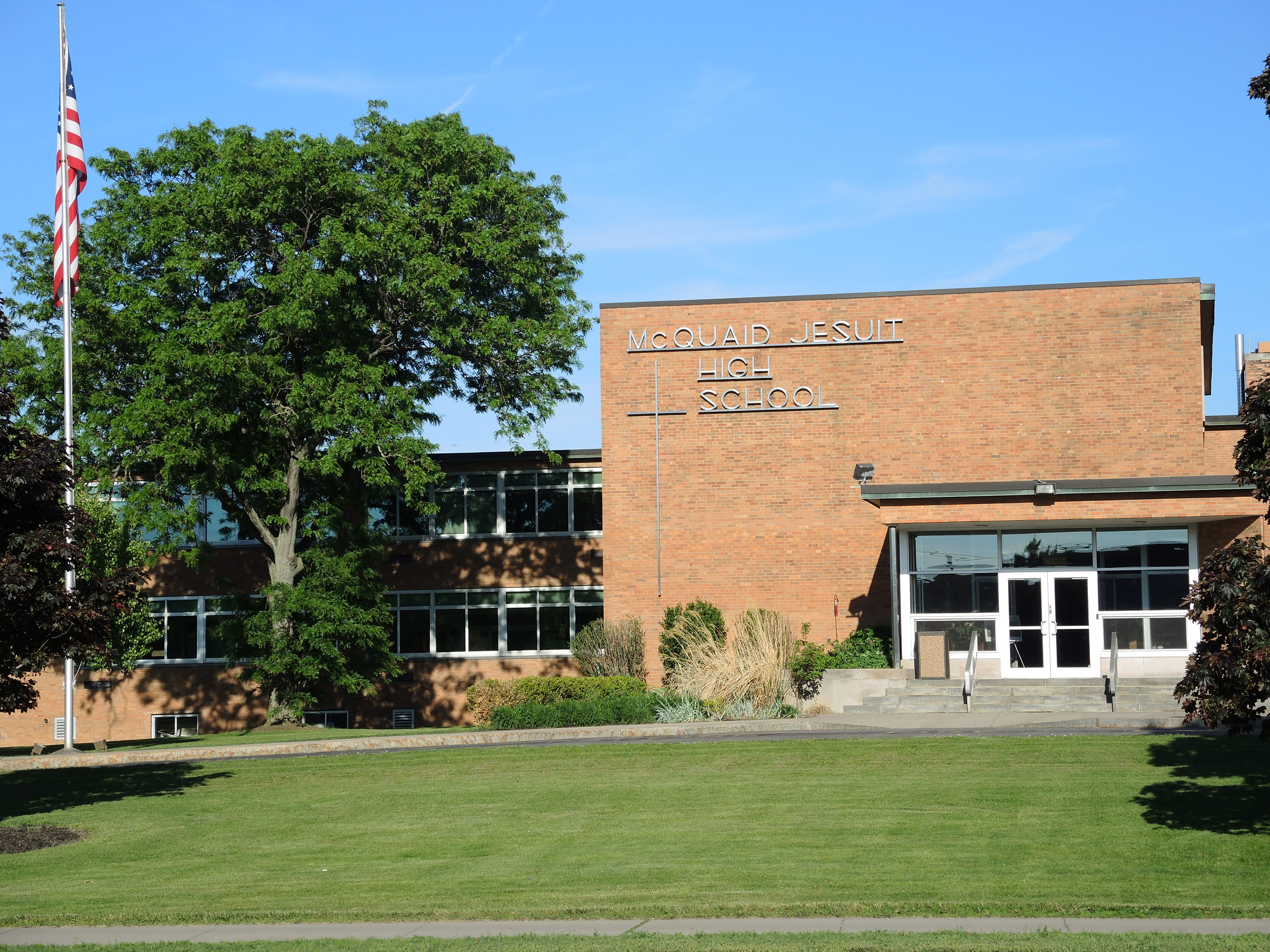
Front entrance of the school.

During the late 1870s, Bishop Bernard McQuaid had tried to convince the Jesuits to found an institution of learning in his diocese. In 1954, McQuaid Jesuit High School opened its doors to 129 young men.

On June 23, 1953, the ground was broken on the 33-acre campus, and the first school building was completed by September 1955. The total construction cost exceeded $2.5 million. While the new school was under construction, classes were held in the former St. Andrew's Seminary building in Rochester. There, the first class of McQuaid Jesuit, which comprised 196 students, was admitted on September 8, 1954. The second school year was held in the current complex, and the school has been in continual operation since then.

In the late 1960s McQuaid Jesuit created BASH. Building A Scholastic Heritage (BASH) is the major fundraising event of the Academic year. The Average Admission for BASH is $255.

McQuaid began to admit eighth graders in 1967; seventh graders in 1993; and sixth graders in 2012. McQuaid now operates as a combined middle/high school.

== Notable alumni ==
- Colin Byrnes, ‘98 - Founder, Kairos Program
- Danny Wegman, '65 - CEO, Wegmans Food Market
- Tom Deckman, '97 - Stage and television actor
- Teddy Geiger, '06 - Grammy-nominated singer, songwriter, and producer
- Frank Paul Geraci, Jr., '69 - Judge of the U.S. District Court for the Western District of New York
- Michael C. Green, '76 - District Attorney for Monroe County
- Jack Leasure, '05 - Professional basketball player, Coach of McQuaid Varsity Basketball
- Steven L. Smith, '04 - Founder/CEO of Perdix Software
- Brodie Lee (Jon Huber, '98) - American professional wrestler
- Charlie Lowell, '92 - Musician Jars of Clay
- Matt Odmark, '92 - Musician Jars of Clay
- Neil Pappalardo, '60 - Founder of MEDITECH
- Ryan Pettinella, '03 - Professional basketball player
- C. J. Rapp, '77 - Founder of Jolt Cola
- John Ryan (musician), '06 - Singer, songwriter, producer, and instrumentalist
- David Schickler, '87 - Author
- Robert R. Thomas, '70 - Chief Justice of the Supreme Court of Illinois and former professional football player

== Notable faculty members ==
- Jeff Van Gundy - Former basketball coach for the New York Knicks and the Houston Rockets, began his coaching career at McQuaid in the 1985–1986 season
- Fr William O'Malley - starred in the 1973 movie "The Exorcist"
