= Albert Paley =

American modernist metal sculptor

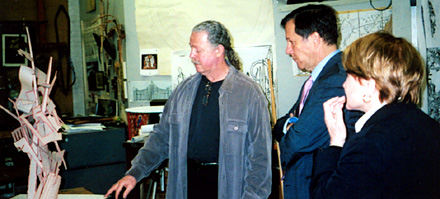
- Paley (left) shows off his studio in 2006 to Dana Gioia and Louise Slaughter.
- Born: Philadelphia, Pennsylvania, United States
- Education: Temple University
- Known for: Sculpture
- Spouse: Frances Paley
- Website: albertpaley.com

Push Plate, a bronze sculpture by Albert Paley, 1981, Metropolitan Museum of Art

Albert Paley (born 1944) is an American modernist metal sculptor. Initially starting out as a jeweler, Paley has become one of the most distinguished and influential metalsmiths in the world. Within each of his works, three foundational elements stay true: the natural environment, the built environment, and the human presence. Paley is the first metal sculptor to have received the Lifetime Achievement Award from the American Institute of Architects. He lives and works in Rochester, New York with his wife, Frances.

== Early life and education ==
He was born in Philadelphia, Pennsylvania during World War II. While his father fought in the Burma Campaign, Albert and his mother lived with his maternal grandparents. Most of Paley's free-time in his young years became occupied by model-kits and the outdoors. At around age 8, Paley joined the Boy Scouts of America, and even became a face for a billboard for the Boy Scouts. At 16, he dropped out of school with no intention of going to college — he planned to work jobs and support his mother after his father developed arthritis.

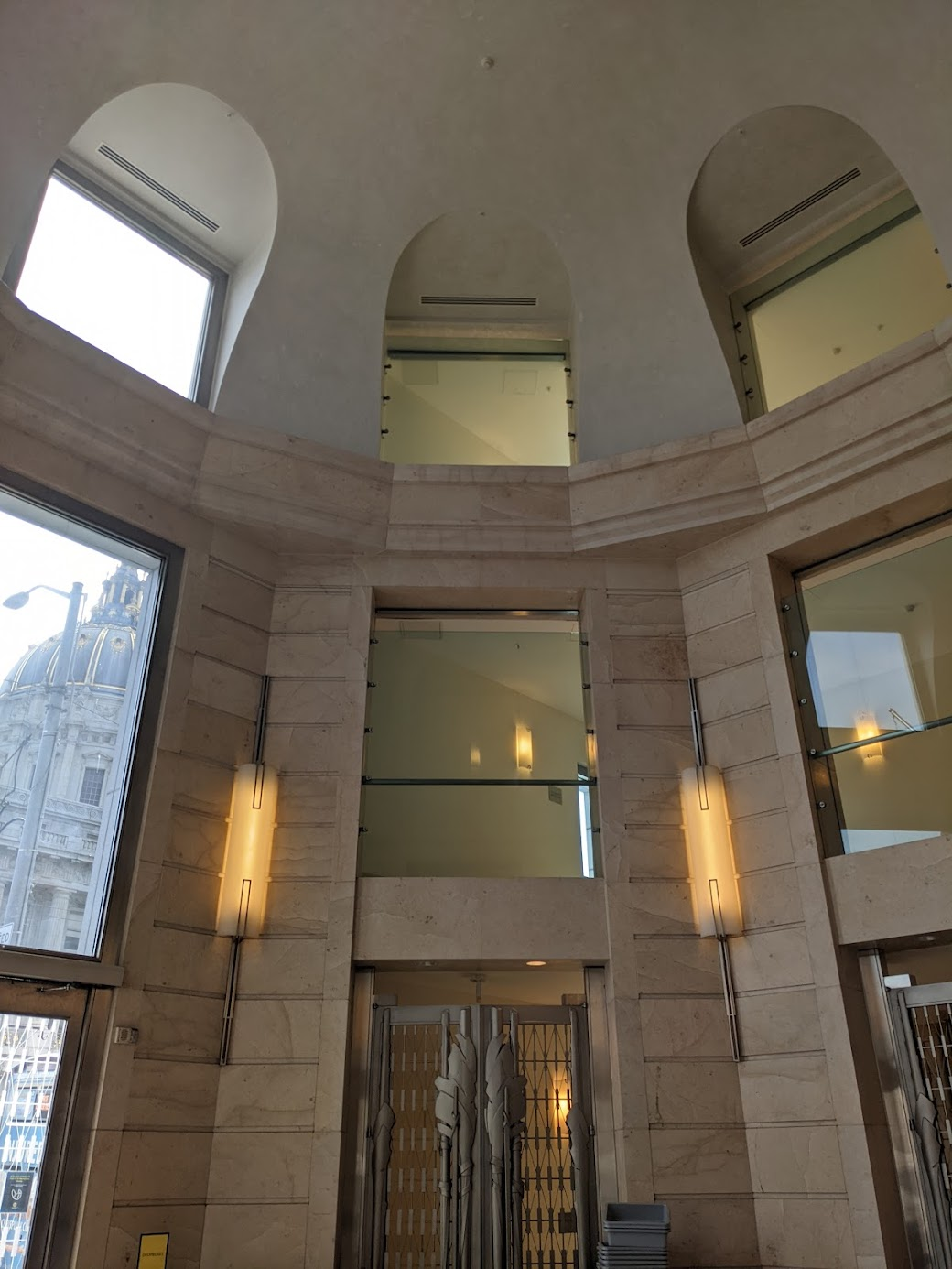
Paley was commissioned to create a series of exterior and interior doors for the San Francisco County Superior Court, located in San Francisco, CA.

It wasn't until a girlfriend took him to the Tyler School of Art that Paley found a blossoming passion for the arts. After excelling in a first semester at Tyler, Albert was accepted into the selective honors program where he had a free selection of classes. During his second year at Tyler, Paley became interested in jewelry-making. He became a studio assistant in the school's metal-shop under the supervision of Stanley Lechtzin, who was a strong influence for Paley.

Paley earned his Bachelor of Fine Arts in sculpting with a minor in metalsmithing in 1966. After receiving his BFA, Paley was torn between sculpting and metalwork for a master's degree, but eventually settled and earned his Master of Fine Arts in goldsmithing. Paley taught full-time while a graduate student, and had stopped experimenting in sculpture, focusing all his time and energy into jewelry work. He received both diplomas from the Tyler School of Art, a part of Temple University, in Philadelphia. He moved to Rochester, New York in 1969 to teach at the Rochester Institute of Technology, where he now holds an endowed chair. He taught goldsmithing until 1972, when he decided to focus solely on his own work.

== Career ==
=== Jewelry ===
After receiving his MFA from the Tyler School of Art, Paley worked with metal as a jewelry designer. He became well known for his style and scale. His jewelry was often big and unique, described by Paley himself for “a certain kind of personality that could carry it...for a strong woman rather than someone who was repressed”. Despite his movement toward forging iron and away from jewelry in the 70's, Paley still continued to make jewelry during the beginning of his career in metalworking. Much of his jewelry was made for private commissions, keeping the pieces solely between him and his clients. He eventually stopped making jewelry completely, collecting any pieces in the possession of galleries, and selling all his tools. Since 1965, Paley's jewelry and metal work have been in over one hundred and fifty national and international exhibitions.

Portal Gates, gate commission for the Renwick Gallery by Albert Paley, 1974, Renwick Gallery

=== Gates and functional objects ===
During his last year in the Philadelphia area, Paley began experimenting with metal again, specifically forging iron. He and Lechtzin pulled together a small workshop for forging in the garage of Lechtzin's home, and spent the summer of 1969 reading about forging and learning how to work with different tools. Paley's big breakthrough was in 1973, when he was awarded a commission from the Smithsonian to design the portal gates for the Renwick Gallery in Washington, D.C. In order to build the gates, Paley found a space to rent and filled it with machinery. He hired a past student, Richard Palmer, as a full-time assistant, and they spent a year creating the famous Portal Gates for the Renwick. After the Portal Gates, Paley's career in metalworking took off, with a focus in functional design: tables, lamps, and other usable forms of sculpture. Paley had created an array of decorative objects before the Renwick Gates, using his garage-shop. But after the gates were finished for the Renwick, Paley was left with a much larger work-space, in addition to a full-time assistant, supplies, and machinery. Paley already had another museum commission from the Hunter Museum of American Art in Tennessee for an 85-foot long ornamental . Since then, Paley has done many private commissions for driveway, garden, and fence gates in addition to his numerous public commissions. Some of his gates to note are the Portal Gates for the New York State Senate Chamber of the State Capitol (1980); the Victoria and Albert Gates for the Victoria and Albert Museum (1982); and the Animals Always Gateway Sculpture for the St. Louis Zoo (2006), currently the largest sculpture at any zoo in the U.S.

=== Large-scale sculpture ===
Paley's first major public sculpture was his Sculpture for the Strong Museum in 1982. It was his first piece that showed a transition from smaller-scale work to his monumental sizes. Paley did several other large-scale sculptures in the 80's which share similarities in their simplicity of form with basic elements. Over time, his sculptures have moved away from simple forms, increasing in both complexity and color. In the summer of 2013, Paley was the featured artist on Park Avenue. Thirteen sculptures were installed for exhibition between 52nd and 67th Streets in New York City. This collection of sculptures was one of Paley's larger projects for one exhibition. Craft in America featured Paley as the final Forge artist in Season 5, aired on PBS. Paley's career move from Goldsmith to Metal Sculptor is well explained in an interesting interview by Cathleen McCarthy.

=== Glass and steel ===
In 1998, Paley was invited to the Pilchuck Glass School for a summer residency. While there, Paley created a mass of glass elements that would be used in later sculptures in Rochester. Paley did another glass residency in 2014 with the Corning Museum of Glass located in Corning, New York. He worked there for a year, where he practiced furnace-working and cast Corning Code 7056, a specific type of glass that can form bonds with a metal alloy called Kovar. Paley chose this specific glass blend because of its similar properties to that of Kovar, which allowed him to create pieces that fused the glass and metal with each other. The first exhibition to focus on Paley's combining of glass and steel, Complementary Contrasts: The Glass and Steel Sculptures of Albert Paley at Museum of Glass will take place during the 2017 - 2018 season, and will display a collection of pieces spanning Paley's work with glass.

=== Major architectural commissions ===
Listed below are some of Albert Paley's major architectural commissions during his career.

- 2013: Park Avenue Sculpture Series
- 2009: Clay Center for the Arts and Sciences, Charleston, West Virginia. entrance sculpture
- 2006: St. Louis Zoological Park, St. Louis, Missouri. Animals Always Sculpture, exterior plaza sculpture
- 2003: Rochester Institute of Technology, Rochester, New York. Sentinel exterior sculpture
- 2000: Naples Museum of Art, Naples, Florida. Portal Gates
- 1996: Sony Pictures Entertainment, Culver Studios, Culver City, California. Primordial Reflections, exterior sculpture
- 1990: Birmingham Museum of Art, Birmingham, Alabama. Confluence, exterior sculpture
- 1987: Wortham Center for the Performing Arts, Houston, Texas. Eight stairway sculptures
- 1981: Pennsylvania Avenue Redevelopment Corporation, Washington, D.C. Tree Grates & Benches for Pennsylvania Avenue
- 1974: Smithsonian Institution, Renwick Gallery, National Museum of American Art, Washington, D.C.Portal Gates

== Awards ==
- 2010: American Craft Council Gold Medal Award for consummate craftsmanship
- 1998: received the Artist of the Year Award of the Arts & Cultural Council for Greater Rochester.
- 1997: Smithsonian Institution, Masters of the Medium Award, Washington, D.C.
- 1995: American Institute of Architects (AIA), Institute Honors Recipient, Lifetime Achievement Award
  National Association of Schools of Art and Design, Citation for Distinguished Service in the Visual Arts
- 1994: American Craft Council, Inducted to the College of Fellows
- 1982: American Institute of Architects (AIA), Award of Excellence

== Bibliography ==
- Kuspit, Donald Burton (2006). Albert Paley, Sculpture. Milan, Italy: Skira.
- Lucie-Smith, Edward (1996). The Art of Albert Paley, Iron, Bronze, Steel. New York: H.N. Abrams.
- Norton, Deborah L. (1991) Albert Paley, Sculptural Adornment. Washington, D.C.: Renwick Gallery of the National Museum of American Art, Smithsonian Institution in association with the University of Washington Press.

== See also ==
- Stanley Lechtzin
- Martin Blank
- Site-specific art
- Jack E. Anderson
- List of American artists 1900 and after
- List of people from Rochester, New York
- List of sculptors
- List of Temple University people
- Visual art of the United States
- Walenty Pytel
