= Foreign Exchange (album) =

Studio album by Rx Papi and Gud
- Released: November 19, 2021
- Genre: Hip-hop
- Length: 19:20
- Label: Year0001
- Producer: Gud

Rx Papi chronology
So Icey Boyz (2021)	Foreign Exchange (2021)	Dope Deals and Record Sales, Vol. 2 (2022)

Gud chronology
Beautiful, Wonderful (2014)	Foreign Exchange (2021)

Foreign Exchange is a collaborative studio album by the American rapper Rx Papi and the Swedish record producer Gud. It was released by Year0001 on November 19, 2021. Gud contacted Rx Papi to collaborate on an album by sending him beats, and Rx Papi recorded the raps over the course of a month.

Foreign Exchange is a hip-hop album that uses breathless and direct raps over synthesizer-driven production. The album explores strained family relationships, the emotional impact of street life, and missed opportunities; Rx Papi also compares himself to notable criminals in its lyrics. The song "12 Stout Street" saw virality on the social platform TikTok. The album received positive reviews from music critics, many of whom enjoyed the contrast between Rx Papi's rapping and Gud's production and felt the collaboration was unexpected. Pitchfork included it in their mid-decade list of the best albums of the 2020s.

== Background and recording ==
Throughout 2021, the American rapper Rx Papi gained attention by releasing the mixtapes 100 Miles & Walk'in and Pap vs. the World. Gud is a Swedish record producer who primarily produces for the hip-hop groups Sad Boys and Drain Gang. He has also produced for musicians such as Halsey, Travis Scott, and Quavo, among others. Gud directly contacted Rx Papi to collaborate because of his appreciation for Rx Papi's work. Gud sent Rx Papi a collection of beats. Rx Papi described the beats as unique and "raw", saying that he recorded his raps to match that rawness. He recorded raps individually when he was inspired by a strong feeling or emotional low point. "12 Stout Street" was recorded at around 2:30 a.m. in his kitchen; he stated that "the beat just said some shit to [him]". Rx Papi referred to the way Gud sent the beats as "the perfect setup". The album was recorded over the course of a month.

== Music and lyrics ==
=== Overview ===
Foreign Exchange is a hip-hop album that does not use common song structures, hooks, or verses; Pitchfork described the result as "a relentless direct address". The production is generally driven by synthesizers and a moody sonic palette, incorporating sound effects such as "claps, rim shots, chimes and hi-hats", according to Sputnikmusic's Benjamin Jack. The lyrics cover topics such as strained relationships with family, the emotional impact of street life, and missed opportunities. In several lines, Rx Papi compares himself to notable crime figures. Rx Papi said the album "was just set up like a book" with different chapters; he described "12 Stout Street" as "real shit", "Teflon Don" as "turnt shit", and "Rahkel" as a "song for shawties".

=== Songs ===
"12 Stout Street"
The lyrics of "12 Stout Street" discuss criminal behavior, Rx Papi addressing his mother, and unwanted lifestyles atop a simple melody.

The opening track of Foreign Exchange is "12 Stout Street", an introspective track which uses a simple melody and a buzz of sustain on every note to emphasize Rx Papi's personal lyricism. The lyrics revolve around themes of criminal behavior, drug use, and legal problems alongside references to future goals. Additionally, Rx Papi addresses his mother, stepfather, and being exiled from his house, alongside the fact that he did not want to live the lifestyle he lives. They also express what is going on in his mind: "For so many years, I held it down / I never in my life wanted to sell drugs / I would've been cool with playing games and shit / But instead I'm running with the gang and shit." Jack said the confessional lyrics make the song sound like "an exaggerated memoir" and a "template for emotional realisation". Millan Verma of Pitchfork called the track "haunting".

The following track, "N.L.M.B.", displays Rx Papi screaming the line "I grew up around fucking dead bodies!" atop a piano line reminiscent of ballads by New Edition or Ready for the World, according to Nadine Smith of Pitchfork. "Teflon Don", a song about aspirations and status, opens with soft keys and a breathless flow. Its instrumental is built around gentle chimes and deep bass, which Jack felt gave the song a more emotional feel. The instrumental emphasizes Rx Papi's rapping; its atmospheric sound contrasts with the song's strong themes. "Albino Steve" features overlapping lines, which Jack viewed as creating the impression of Rx Papi "arguing with himself, or finishing his own sentences through a second persona". The production, which revolves around a looping synthesizer and 808 drums, creates a tense and disturbing atmosphere. "Split Decision" is driven by synthesizers. "Still in da Hood" makes references to popular culture in its lyrics: "Drako sound like Boomhauer" and "Spike Dudley with the leg drop." Smith viewed these lines as "small comforts" in a world containing constant threats of death. Jack called the song "relatively simple yet vicious". The penultimate track, "Rahkel", was written about Rx Papi's girlfriend. Using a simple and atypical soundscape, it is built around distorted synthesizers and themes of optimism. The closing track, "Liar", concludes with the line: "I walk in this bitch, I don't want to". Jack viewed this ending as a callback to the lines where Rx Papi compares himself to notable criminals, reworked to show a new sense of heavy consequences. He described it as a "sober ending" in which "both ego and conscience present themselves for a final curtain call".

== Release and reception ==
Professional ratings
Review scores
Source	Rating
laut.de	4/5 stars
Pitchfork	7.4/10
Sputnikmusic	4.5/5

Foreign Exchange was released by Year0001 on November 19, 2021. The album was released while Rx Papi was in prison; he was not aware of the album's success while incarcerated. People would send him articles about the album, which he said "just felt like any other regular shit [he] did". "12 Stout Street" saw virality on the social media platform TikTok. BET stated that "Still in da Hood" appealed to listeners that consider themselves "misfits".

Upon its release, Foreign Exchange received a positive review from Pitchfork. Smith called it "tight and cohesive", which she attributed to Gud's "experienced pop precision". She also called it "more direct than Gud's work with Sad Boys" due to Rx Papi's flow, further stating that Gud's production "emphasizes the grit and pain inherent in [Rx Papi's] voice" even when his lyrics are not "transparently emotional". Alphonse Pierre of the same website considered it Rx Papi's best release. Sputnikmusic also reviewed the album positively; Jack highlighted the oddity of the collaboration and called the album a "thing of beauty". He enjoyed the boldness of the album's "creative hip-hop", "abrasive" lyricism, and instrumentals. He described "Liar" as "the perfect conclusion to Foreign Exchange in many respects", highlighting its final line.

In a positive review of the album for laut.de, Gölz praised the contrast between Rx Papi's "grim street aesthetic" (Note: This quote is a translation of the original text: "grimmige Straßenästhetik") and Gud's psychedelic production for making the music sound raw. He further expressed that Rx Papi can speak "so unfiltered that it can sometimes be uncomfortable", (Note: This quote is a translation of the original text: "so filterlos, dass es teils unangenehm berühren kann") citing "12 Stout Street" as an example. He concluded his review by stating that "even though this coming together of two weirdos is far too niche to be a major success", (Note: This quote is a translation of the original text: "auch, wenn diese Zusammenkunft zweier Weirdos viel zu nischig für einen großen Wurf sein wird") it "still feels somewhat groundbreaking". (Note: This quote is a translation of the original text: "doch irgendwie wegweisend an") Gölz also wrote that several songs "sound like emotional outbursts in a therapy session, rhymed only by chance". (Note: This quote is a translation of the original text: "Mehrmals bekommen wir Songs zu hören, die klingen, wie Gefühlsausbrüche in einer Therapiesitze, die nur zufällig gereimt wurden.") In October 2024, Pitchfork included Foreign Exchange in its mid-decade list of the best albums of the 2020s. Verma called it Rx Papi's opus and "his best and most fully realized project". He lauded the contrast between Gud's "dreamscapes" and Rx Papi's "grating verses about rocky family relationships". Several critics felt the collaboration between Rx Papi and Gud was unexpected.

== Track listing ==
All tracks are written by Chester Roscoe (Rx Papi) and Carl-Mikael Berlander (Gud). All tracks are produced by Gud.

Foreign Exchange track listing
No.	Title	Length
1.	"12 Stout Street"	1:58
2.	"N.L.M.B."	2:04
3.	"Teflon Don"	2:12
4.	"Albino Steve"	2:12
5.	"Split Decision"	2:27
6.	"Still in da Hood"	3:08
7.	"Rahkel"	2:13
8.	"Liar"	3:06
Total length:		19:20

== Personnel ==
Credits are adapted from Year0001's website and Tidal.

- Rx Papi – writer
- Gud – writer, producer, mixing, master
