= C. J. Rapp =

American beverage inventor

C.J. Rapp is an American beverage inventor best known for inventing and marketing high-caffeine Jolt Cola.

In 1985, C. J. Rapp developed Jolt Cola, which contains 72 milligrams of caffeine, which is the maximum amount permitted by the US Food and Drug Administration. He attended McQuaid Jesuit High School in Rochester, New York. As a sociology major at SUNY Potsdam, Rapp noticed that students concocted beverages to help them stay awake to finish term papers, complete research projects, pledge in Greek life or study for exams.

At a time when beverage producers were promoting the idea that less is better – that they contained either zero or less caffeine, sugar, or calories – Rapp promoted his cola by emphasizing that it had twice the caffeine found in other colas. In the mid-1980s, the slogan on every bottle and can of Jolt read "Twice the Caffeine."

The approach worked and gave the new product high visibility. Jolt soon appeared on Late Night with David Letterman, Good Morning America and CNN. The maverick cola quickly found its niche market.

Rapp slowly began expanding his product line, which now includes Blu Botl, DNA, Martinelli's, Pirate's Keg, First Tee, and XTC. His company, Wet Planet Beverages, markets ten beverage brands in 22 countries. The company tends to use creative packaging.

== See also ==
- Red Bull

== Other sources ==
- Beer You Can Bet On
- Klineman, Jeffrey (March 16, 2015). "Still Infused with Faith". BevNet. Archived from the original on December 20, 2015.
- Astor, Will (November 10, 2009). "Jolt founder sues private-equity firm for $31 million". Rochester Business Journal. Archived from the original on March 4, 2016.
- Yogachandra, Natascha (August 27, 2009). "Pittsford-based Karma Culture launches national distribution". Brighton-Pittsford Post. Archived from the original on January 11, 2016.
- Stone, Mary (September 8, 2011). "Jolt Cola founder launches new line of nutrient-enhanced drinks". Rochester Business Journal. Archived from the original on August 12, 2016.
- Danna, Nicole (August 17, 2012). "Orange Julius: It Lives! (Dairy Queen is Reviving the Brand) and Three Other Drinks That Should Have Survived the '80s". Broward Palm Beach New Times. Archived from the original on March 5, 2016.
- Capps, Brook (April 16, 2007). "Jolt Wakes Up to Keyed-Up Category". Ad Age. Archived from the original on September 22, 2015.
