= Rx Papi =

American rapper (born 1995)

- Also known as: DrugRixh Papi; Lil Fleechy; YR; Big Belly Fred; Marlo; SouthSide Mike; Cartier Jigg
- Born: Chester Author Roscoe; May 17, 1995 (age 30)
- Origin: Rochester, New York
- Genres: Hip-hop; cloud rap; trap; plugg
- Occupations: Rapper, songwriter

Chester Author Roscoe (born May 17, 1995), known professionally as Rx Papi (formerly DrugRixh Papi and Lil Fleechy), is an American rapper from Rochester, New York. He is best known for his collaborative album Foreign Exchange, as well as his work with fellow Rochester rapper RXKNephew.

== Musical style and influences ==
Rx Papi's music mostly persists of lyrics about street life and personal strife rapped over modern trap and plugg instrumentals. Influences including real-life and fictional gangsters, musicians like DJ Screw, and different drugs of choice can be heard throughout his music. Fans and critics note the undertones of comedy and tragedy in his most famous songs.

== Discography ==
- Trimothy Jones (2025)
- Sexy Wave For You Girls 2 (2025)
- Be Quiet Im Tryna Record (2025)
- The Johnny Sparks Story (2025)
- Sorry I Been Ballin (2025)
- D.A.W.G Pt. 2 (2024)
- For The Bros & The 304's (2024)
- Made Man (2024)
- Raheem Dead, Somebody Shot Em (2024)
- My Name Is My Name (2023)
- Dawg Storm (2023)
- Marlo (2023)
- Pack A Punch (2022)
- First Week Out EP (2022)
- Dope Deals and Record Sales, Vol. 2 (2022)
- Foreign Exchange (2021)
- So Icey Boyz (2021)
- D.A.W.G. (2021)
- Pap Vs. The World (2021)
- Dope Deals And Record Sales (2021)
- 100 Miles & Walk'in (2021)
- Mood (2020)
- The Real Dominic Toretto (2020)
- Cartier Jigg 2 (2020)
- Voices in My Head 2 (2020)
- SpeedBump Curt (2020)
- In So Many Words (2020)
- Cartier Jigg (2020)
- Traumatized (2020)
- Numbers Tell a Different Story (2020)
- Sexy Wave for You Girls (2020)
- Santeria (2020)
- .556 (2019)
- Slithavel (2019)
- Vigilante Papi (2019)
- Broken Pots (2019)
- Voices In My Head (2019)
- Hood Hoes an Stoves (2019)
- Papi Montana (2019)
