= Wet Planet Beverages =

American beverage company

Wet Planet Beverages, of Pittsford, New York, was the company which produced Jolt Cola, Napa Valley Soda, Thornwood Estates, Autumn Frost, and DNA. They were also a distributor for Martinelli's Sparkling Cider.

== History ==
On September 28, 2009, The Jolt Company, Inc. filed Chapter 11 proceedings in the United States Bankruptcy Court in Rochester, New York and simultaneously filed a motion to permit sale of the company's assets through a court-approved sale. It declared bankruptcy after failing to meet the demands from Rexam to fulfill an agreement over buying resealable cans.

Eight years later, Jolt Cola returned to the market through an exclusive agreement with Dollar General Stores. Wet Planet Beverages no longer owns the Jolt Cola name; the current revival is credited to Manhattan-based ECC Jolt, LLC.
