= American TTerroristt =

2020 song by RXKNephew

Song by RXKNephew

from the album Crack Therapy 3
- Released: December 22, 2020
- Genre: Trap
- Length: 9:45
- Songwriter: Kristopher Kevon Williams
- Producer: BossUp

"American TTerroristt" is a song by American rapper RXKNephew released on December 22, 2020. Pitchfork ranked "American TTerroristt" number two on their "Best Songs of the 2020s So Far" list in 2024.

== Music and lyrics ==
The instrumental consists of a trap-based loop. The ten-minute track showcases an unorthodox stream-of-consciousness lyrical style, touching on topics primarily related to conspiracy theories and 21st-century political commentary.

On "American TTerroristt", RXKNephew assails the general mentality and state of the American public. In succession on the song, Nephew attacks the lessons of the Bible, organized religion, thanataphobia, Benjamin Franklin, Christopher Columbus, race in America, quality of education, Santa Claus, the Jehovah's Witnesses denomination he was raised in, Simon Cowell, the treatment of prisoners, snitching, fortune-telling, Will Smith, SpongeBob SquarePants, Lil' Kim, Cardi B, and Migos.

== Reception ==
Pitchfork ranked "American TTerroristt" the forty-fourth best song of 2021 as well as the second "best [song] of the 2020s so far" as of 2024. Rolling Stone described the song as capturing "the free-floating energy of right now. Call him hip-hop's Kerouac".
