= Dan Conway =

English cricketer

Personal information
- Full name: Danny Oliver Conway
- Born: 1 May 1985 (age 41); Stockton-on-Tees, County Durham, England
- Batting: Right-handed
- Bowling: Right-arm medium

Domestic team information
- Years: Team
- 2013–present: Herefordshire
- 2010–2012: Oxford MCCU
- 2008–2010: Cumberland

Career statistics
Competition	First-class
Matches	7
Runs scored	43
Batting average	10.75
100s/50s	–/–
Top score	20
Balls bowled	1,116
Wickets	18
Bowling average	38.00
5 wickets in innings	–
10 wickets in match	–
Best bowling	4/48
Catches/stumpings	2/–
- Source: Cricinfo, 25 May 2013

Danny Oliver Conway (born 1 May 1985) is an English cricketer. Conway is a right-handed batsman who bowls right-arm medium pace. He was born in Stockton-on-Tees, County Durham.

Conway made his debut for Cumberland in the 2008 Minor Counties Championship debut against Norfolk. He made has made seven further appearances to 2010. His MCCA Knockout Trophy debut for Cumberland also came in 2008 against Shropshire, with Conway making eight further appearances in that competition to 2010. He left Cumberland at the end of the 2010 season, joining Herefordshire two years later, making his debut for his new county against Wiltshire in the 2012 Minor Counties Championship.

In the 2010 season, he made his first-class debut for Oxford MCCU against Northamptonshire at the University Parks, making two further first-class fixtures in that season against Hampshire and Middlesex. He made a further three first-class appearances in 2011, before making a final appearance in 2012 against Glamorgan. In his seven first-class matches for Oxford MCCU, Conway took 18 wickets at an average of 38.00, with best figures of 4/48. With the bat, he scored 43 runs at an average of 10.75, and a high score of 20.
