= Dark Justice (American TV series) =

American Television Series

Dark Justice is an American comedy television series created and written by Mike Gerbino. Che Holloway stars as the first Officer of color to work in a small town police department. The series premiered January 10, 2016. The first season had six episodes. Dark Justice has won multiple awards such as Best Web Series at the ROC Awards in Rochester, New York and Best Web Series at the New York Web Festival in New York City.

== Cast and characters ==
- Che Holloway as Amir Johnson, the first officer of color to work in an all white police department
- Tim O'Connor as Stanton, Amir Johnson's police partner
- Jon Cesar as Reverend Charles X. Maxton
- Mooney Faugh as the Chief of Police
- Page O'Neil as Grace, the first female lieutenant of color
- Elaine Cost as a follower of Maxton
- Crescenzo Scipione as a follower of Maxton

== Production ==
The series was co produced by Travis Cannan and Mike Gerbino. The series was filmed in various locations including Rochester, New York and Buffalo, New York. Cinematography by Travis Cannan. The sound department for Dark Justice Show was a collaborative effort by Elisa Peebles, Benjamin Jura, Zahra, Alzubaidi, Michael McFadden, Adam Bloch and Wes Ranson. Brian Varney served as Head of the Art Department. The opening score for Dark Justice Show is "I Think I'm Gonna Get Arrested" written and performed by We Stole The Show.
