= Martin Blank (artist) =

American glass artist (born 1962)

'Drinking from the Cup #2' by 'Martin Blank, 2001, Honolulu Museum of Art

Martin Blank (born August 29, 1962), is an American glass artist. He received a BFA degree from the Rhode Island School of Design in 1984 with a major in glass. He studied with Dale Chihuly and by the 1990s was working independently. Blank has taught at Pilchuck Glass School in Stanwood, Washington and Pratt Fine Arts Center in Seattle, Washington. He lives and works in Seattle.

Martin Blank is known for both figurative sculptures and architectural glass installations. Drinking from the Cup #2, in the collection of the Honolulu Museum of Art, is typical of the artist's figurative work, which usually represents the human body in blown glass. The Corning Museum of Glass (Corning, New York), the Honolulu Museum of Art (Hawaii), the Krannert Art Museum (Champaign, Illinois), the Mary & Leigh Bloch Museum of Art (Northwestern University, Evanston, Illinois), the Millennium Museum (Beijing, China), the Montreal Museum of Fine Arts (Montreal, Canada), the Museum of Contemporary Art, Benzaiten Center for Creative Arts (Lake Worth Beach, Florida), the Museum of Fine Arts, Boston, Palm Beach Community College Museum (Palm Beach, Florida), the Shanghai Museum of Fine Art (China), the Tampa Museum of Art (Tampa, Florida), and the Imagine Museum (St. Petersburg, Florida) are among the public collections holding glass sculptures by Martin Blank.
