= Jolt Cola =

Carbonated soft drink

- Type: Cola; Energy drink
- Origin: United States
- Introduced: 1985; 41 years ago
- Flavour: Cola
- Website: www.joltcola.com

Jolt Cola is an American carbonated soft drink originally produced by The Jolt Company, Inc., later known as Wet Planet Beverages. The cola drink was created in 1985 by C. J. Rapp as a highly caffeinated beverage. It was targeted towards students and young professionals, stressing its use as a stimulant in a similar manner as energy drinks. Its original slogan read "All the sugar and twice the caffeine!"

== History ==
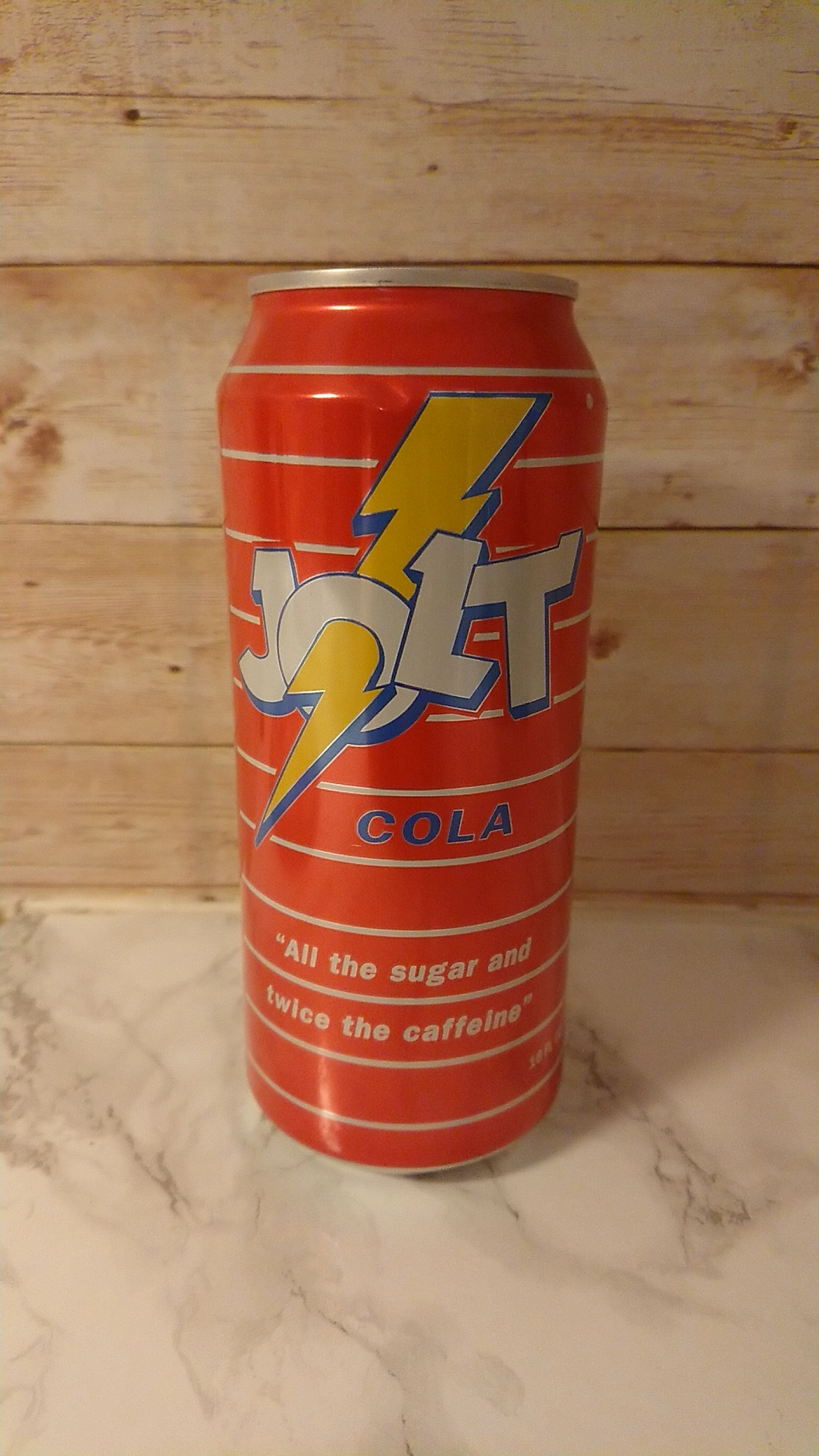
A can of Jolt Cola

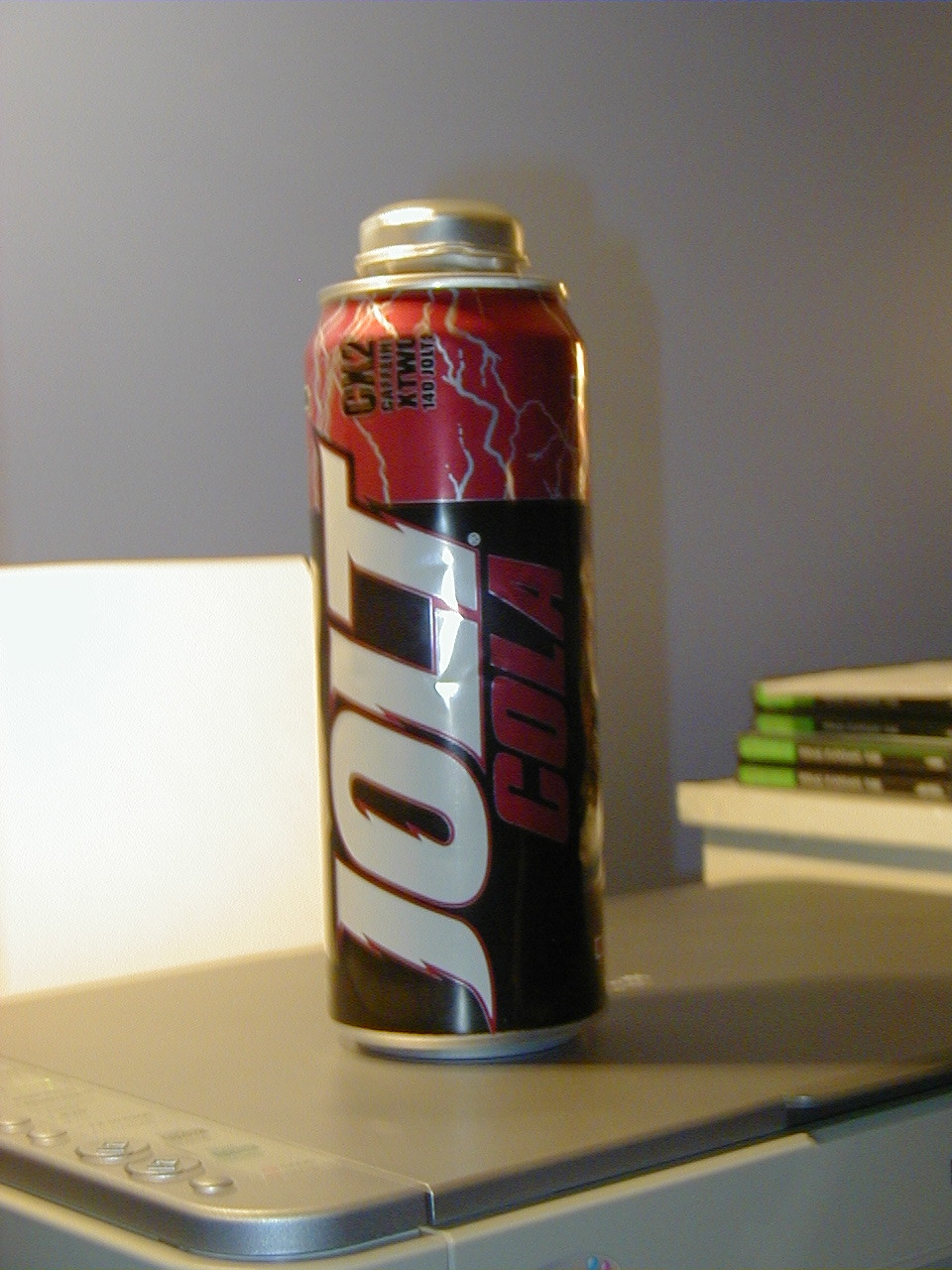
A "battery bottle"

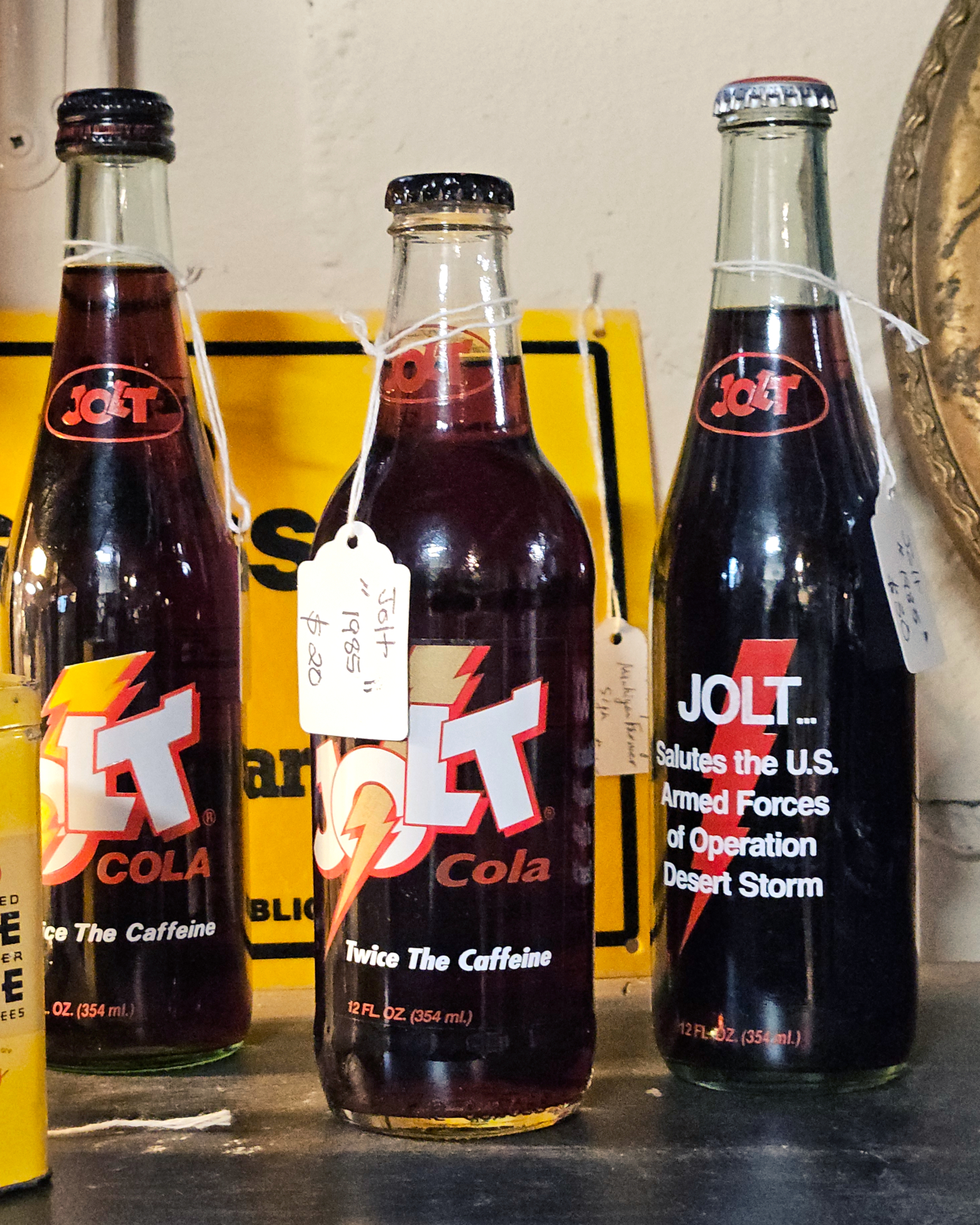
Jolt Cola in glass bottles, ca. 1985–1991

Jolt Cola was a beverage originally made by The Jolt Company, Inc., of Rochester, New York. From the outset, Jolt's marketing strategy centered on the caffeine content, billing the drink as a means to promote wakefulness. The initial slogan was "All the sugar and twice the caffeine."

In the summer of 1987, the company began marketing a low calorie version, called Jolt 25, which was sweetened with a mixture of sugar and NutraSweet (a brand of aspartame), with 25 calories per 12 US fl oz (350 ml) can. Jolt Cola later diversified into additional flavors named Cherry Bomb, Citrus Climax, Orange Blast, White Lightning (grape), Red Eye, and Electric Blue.

In 2003, the name was licensed to a Hackensack, New Jersey, company named GumRunners, Inc., which manufactures a line of caffeinated gum and mints bearing the Jolt label and the slogan "Chew More, Do More." The gum came in two flavors: Spearmint and Icy Mint.

In 2006, Jolt Cola revamped its product line to Jolt Energy and changed its logo and packaging, called "Jolt battery bottles", resembling the shape of an AA battery and which make a loud popping sound when opened. The cans were 23.5 US fl oz (695 ml) resealable aluminum bottles, with a body similar to that of a standard aluminum beverage can. The top had a twist-off aluminum cap with a plastic gasket liner.

They also offered smaller "Quick Fix" 8.5 US fl oz (250 ml) single-use pull-tab aluminum cans, similar to those used for Red Bull and "battery cans" (16 US fl oz (473 ml) resealable aluminum cans with the same twist-off top as the battery bottles. The Jolt Cola Web site claimed that the "Quick Fix" sizes were available at establishments serving "adult beverages", for use as a mixer. The flavors of Jolt were changed. Flavors were Cola, Blue Raspberry, Cherry Bomb (cherry cola), Silver (lemon-lime), Wild Grape, Orange Blast, Passionfruit (featuring a yellow can) and Ultra (a diet drink with Splenda as its artificial sweetener alongside guarana, ginseng, taurine, and vitamin B complex).

In 2008, the founder of The Jolt Company, C.J. Rapp, sold a controlling interest in the company to Emigrant Capital. In early 2009, the new owners removed Rapp as CEO of The Jolt Company. Later in 2009, the new owners filed for bankruptcy. Rapp and other shareholders had the bankruptcy filings overturned and dismissed from the courts. Rapp and another shareholder sued Emigrant Capital for breach of fiduciary responsibility. After eight years of litigation, Rapp and Emigrant reached undisclosed settlement terms.

In August 2017, Geek.com confirmed that Jolt Cola would return at Dollar General stores in September 2017. This version of Jolt Cola was produced for ECC Jolt, LLC, a New York City-based company. Jolt Cola ceased updating its international social media outlets in March 2019. Shortly thereafter, Dollar General stopped selling the product. It is still being manufactured for the domestic market in Australia.

In October 2024, the sports supplement company Redcon1 announced an upcoming release of a sugar-free energy drink with Redcon1 and Jolt Cola co-branding.

== Jolt Energy ==
Beginning in 2006, Jolt Cola and related flavors were rebranded as Jolt Energy. Jolt Energy Drinks were produced in multiple flavors: Power Cola, Orange Burst, Wild Grape, Blue Bolt (blue raspberry), Blue Zero Carb, Cherry Bomb, Ultra, and Silver. The company manufactured and marketed a line of caffeinated chewing gums in various flavors under the brand-name Jolt Energy Gum.

== Worldwide ==
Jolt Cola is manufactured under license in Australia and Sweden, and formerly (and briefly) in the United Kingdom and the Philippines. The German and Swedish supplier uses the old logos, branding and formulation, and only sells the original flavor. Jolt Cola is available in the Netherlands and Finland. Jolt Cola Netherlands is a subsidiary of Jolt Cola Germany.

In Ireland, Jolt Cola was sold in 500 ml (17 US fl oz) bottles in most Eurospars and Dunnes Stores.

In Sweden and the Netherlands, Jolt Cola is heavily associated with LAN parties. In 2010, desperate fans of the drink paid 37.50 kr (over US$4.00) per can when it was thought that Jolt would be discontinued .

In Australia ("bottled under the authority of the Jolt Company Inc. by Jolt Corporation Australia Pty Ltd, 1 Barrpowell Street Welland" South Australia), Jolt is sold in the traditional cola flavor, as well as lime, root beer, cream soda, black cherry and orange flavors. It generally comes in 615 ml (20.8 US fl oz) bottles, with 190 mg of caffeine (309 mg/L). In 2006, bottle capacities were reduced to 600 ml (20 US fl oz). With a caffeine concentration of 47 mg per 100 ml, these bottles contain 282 mg. For many years, Jolt has not been available (for example in capital cities such as Canberra or Brisbane). The Jolt Cola Australian website has a shopping section and claims to deliver to the door, primarily 330mL bottle volumes in cases of fifteen bottles.

Jolt Cola was available in Pakistan in the late 90s where it introduced several new flavors. However they were not very successful and ceased selling shortly.

Jolt Cola was available in Japan in the late 1980s and early 1990s. It was made available through the local distributorship of UCC Ueshima Coffee Co..

In the Philippines, Cosmos Bottling Corporation, makers of Sarsi and Pop Cola, entered into a licensing agreement in 1995 to manufacture and distribute Jolt Cola. The license was terminated in 2001 after Cosmos was acquired by Coca-Cola Bottlers Philippines, Inc.

Jolt was redistributed after the formula was modified by RC Cola distributor Eduardo Sanchez and Victoria Lambert.

== Legacy and influence ==
The Jolt Awards were presented annually from 1991 by Dr. Dobb's Journal until it ceased publication in 2009. The awards logo was modeled on the old Jolt Cola logo and Jolt Cola was served at the presentation ceremonies.

Dennis Nedry from the 1993 film Jurassic Park drinks Jolt Cola and has a few cans on his workspace.

Jolt Cola is featured in the 1995 motion picture Hackers. Two hosts of a pirate television broadcast claim to be sponsored by the beverage and advertise Jolt Cola as "the soft drink of the elite hacker".

Jolt makes a brief appearance in a season eight episode of Mystery Science Theater 3000, during which Mike, Tom Servo, and Crow riff upon the 1975 film The Giant Spider Invasion.

Jolt makes a brief appearance in season 3, episode 5 "Chapter Five: The Flayed" of Stranger Things. Jim Hopper, the Chief of police for the town of Hawkins, Indiana, rushes into a 7-11 convenience store with Joyce Byers, and a Russian scientist, and 2 of them, Jim and Joyce, rush to the cooler, grab two 12oz cans of Jolt, and chug as fast as they can due to being extremely parched from walking a long distance without any food or drink.

Jolt is the subject of the Warlock Pinchers song "Jolt Is" from their 1988 album Pinch a Loaf. It begins with a brief interview of teen pop star Tiffany, where she claims that she's tried Fruit Stripe Gum, but admits she never tried Jolt when asked.

Tracey Jordan demands a Jolt Cola in the 2010 episode of 30 Rock, "Reaganing", despite acknowledging that "It does not exist anymore!"
