= Fridolin Pascalar =

German priest (1841–1899)

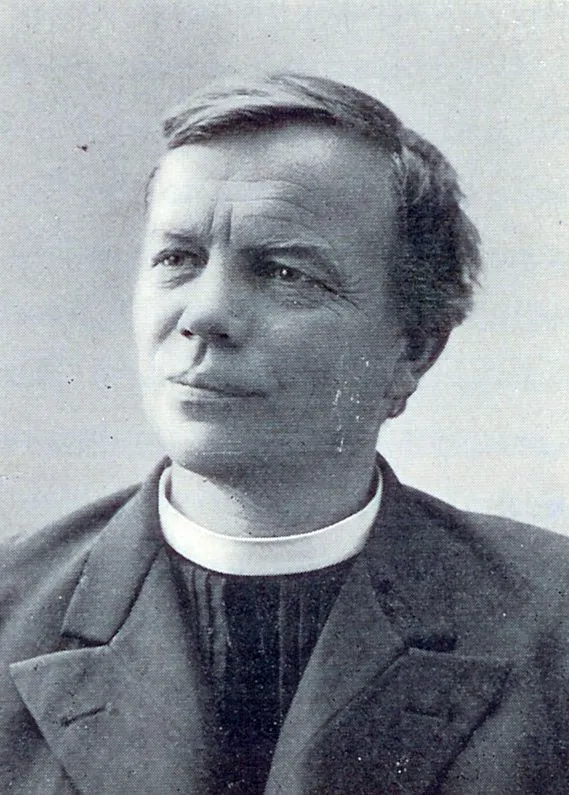
- Rev. Fridolin Pascalar, the pastor of St. Michael's Church in Rochester, New York from 1874-1896.
- Born: Fridolin Piscalar'; May 14, 1841; Stimpfach, Schwäbisch Hall, Kingdom of Württemberg
- Died: February 12, 1899 (aged 57); Untermarchtal, Alb-Donau-Kreis, Kingdom of Württemberg
- Occupations: Jesuit, Catholic priest
- Years active: 1867–1899

Fridolin Pascalar (May 14, 1841 – February 12, 1899) was a German Jesuit and Catholic priest. He served as the first permanent pastor of St. Michael's Church in Rochester, New York from November 1874 until his resignation in April 1896.

== Early life ==
Fridolin Piscalar was born on May 14, 1841, in Stimpfach, Württemberg, to Joseph Piscalar and Crescentia Greiner. He was the oldest of five children, Johannes, Karl, Klara, and Johanna. His uncle was Alois Urban Piscalar, also a German Catholic priest.

He received his primary education in the local parochial schools, and he worked as a carpenter for four years after being confirmed.

Piscalar went on a mission trip to Bombay on September 12, 1867. He returned to Wurttemberg in 1870, for he was not well-suited to India's climate. However, it was from his time in India which he wrote about the "impending angst and frustration sensed by so many Catholics" due to Otto von Bismarck trying to make the Second German Reich into a Protestant nation.

It is at the present time greatly reassuring for once to turn one's eyes away from the constant agitation against the Catholic Church, and to gaze across the Red Sea and the Indian Ocean to a heathen land, in which the fundamental principles of equity justice toward the Catholics are more familiar, at least better followed than in our modern Europe.

— Fridolin Piscalar, S. J., just before the Kulturkampf,

He was ordained on July 30, 1872, in Maria Laach Abbey.

== Priesthood ==
Piscalar arrived in the United States in November 1873, in order to become the pastor of the newly-formed St Michael's Church in Rochester, New York. The St. Michael's church was completed on March 8, 1874, and in November 1874, he was appointed to be the first resident pastor. He was the pastor and treasurer there for twenty two years until his resignation in April 1896. Early in his tenure, he assisted Polish families while overseeing the parish's construction of the church, which took two years to complete and cost $160,000 at that time. He changed his last name to Pascalar not long after his arrival.

In 1891, he was sent by Bishop Bernard McQuaid to recruit young German and Polish women for the Sisters of St. Joseph for the St. Stanislaus Kostka Church. Twenty-one young women returned with him to join, where they tutored newly arrived immigrant children in English, served as pastoral assistants, trained altar servers, instructed faith-formation classes, cleaned the church and directed the choir.

In 1892, he patented a self-filling holy water fountain to be used in churches.

Pascalar presented two young Virginia red-tailed deer to the Genesee Valley Park in 1894. At the time, it was the first and only official gift to Rochester Parks, now the Monroe County Department of Parks. One of them was fatally attacked by dogs.

== Later life and death ==
He resigned due to failing health in April 1896. He returned to Württemberg, and he died in Untermarchtal on February 12, 1899. His death was met with surprise and sadness from the attendees at St. Michael's Church. His likeness is embedded in the stained-glass window display on the church's south wall, where he is looking at Bishop McQuaid.
