= Saint Michael's Church (Rochester, New York) =

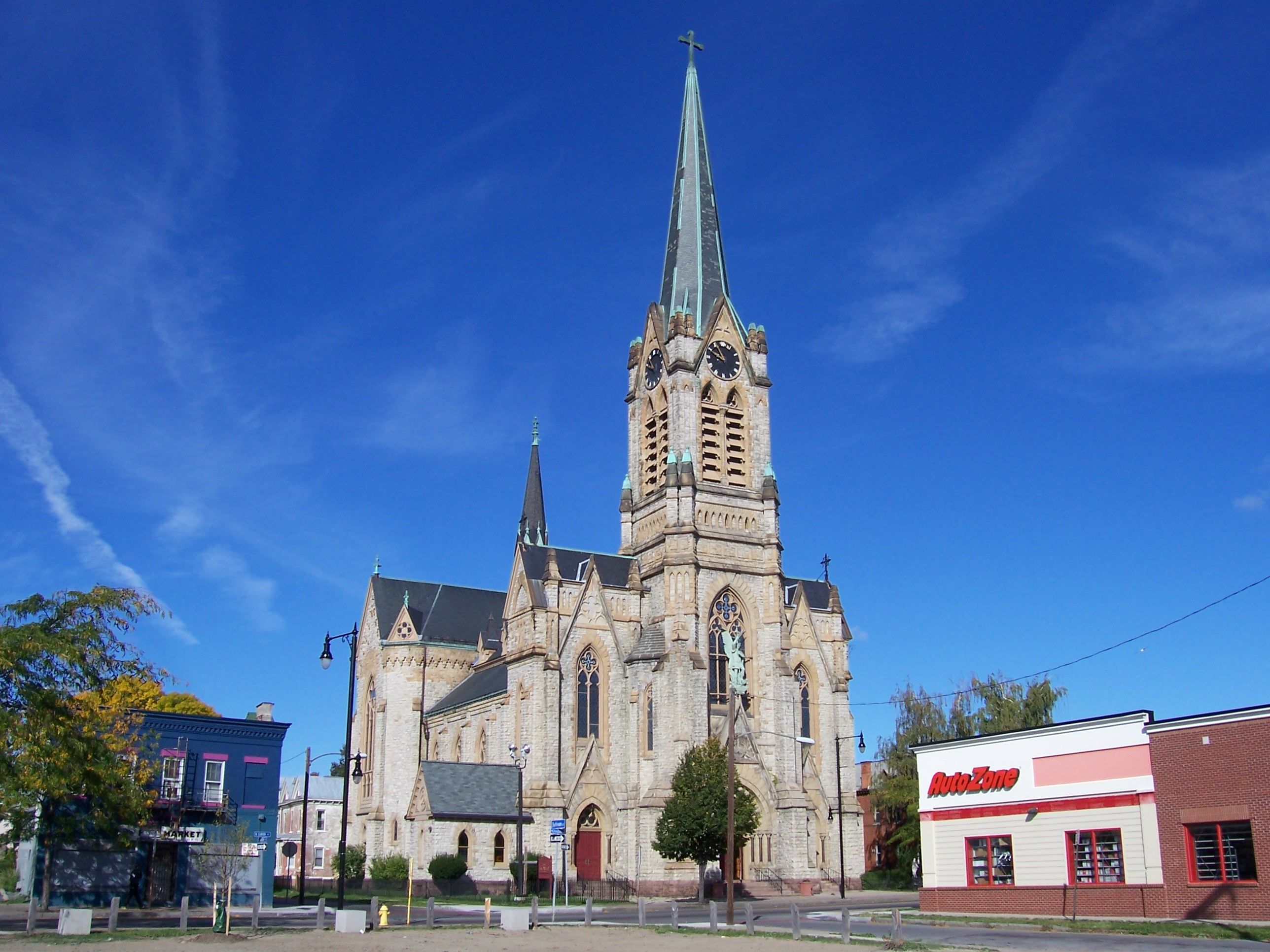
- Saint Michael's Church
- 43.174439°N 77.613142°W
- Location: 869 North Clinton Avenue, Rochester, New York
- Country: United States
- Language: Spanish
- Denomination: Roman Catholic
- Tradition: Latin Church
- Website: St. Michael's Church

History
- Status: Parish church
- Founded: 1872
- Dedicated: 1890 (present church)

Architecture
- Functional status: Active
- Architect: Adolphus Druiding
- Style: Gothic Revival
- Completed: 1890
- Construction cost: US$150,000 (1890)

Specifications
- Capacity: 1,100
- Length: 177 feet (53.9 m)
- Width: 92 feet (28.0 m)
- Height: 256 feet (78.0 m)
- Materials: Lockport sandstone, Medina brownstone

Administration
- Diocese: Roman Catholic Diocese of Rochester
- Deanery: Monroe Central Deanery
- Parish: St. Frances Xavier Cabrini Parish

Clergy
- Pastor: Rev. Fr. Daniel Ruiz-Sierra

Saint Michael's Church is a Roman Catholic church located at 869 North Clinton Avenue in Rochester, New York. Standing at 256 feet (78 m), its tower is the tallest church steeple in Rochester and the 10th tallest structure in the city. It was the tallest building in Rochester from its completion in 1890 until the construction of the Kodak Tower in 1914. The church is an active parish within the Roman Catholic Diocese of Rochester, Monroe Central Deanery, and is one of three churches that make up the Saint Frances Xavier Cabrini Parish, alongside Church of the Annunciation and Our Lady of the Americas Church. Masses at St. Michael's are currently celebrated only in Spanish. The church complex is the sole remaining example of an entirely 19th-century religious campus in Rochester.

== History ==
=== Founding and first church (1872–1887) ===
In June 1872, parishioners at St. Joseph's and Holy Redeemer Catholic parishes proposed building a new church closer to their homes in the city's northeastern section. Bishop McQuaid authorized them to purchase 2 acres (0.81 ha) of land at the corner of North Clinton and Clifford Avenues. Father A. Pingel of St. Joseph's Church was placed in temporary charge of the 80 families from St. Joseph's and the 100 families from Holy Redeemer who formed the first congregation. The new parish was formally organized on May 26, 1873, with St. Michael chosen as its patron saint.

Plans were drawn for a combination church and school building, 126 feet (38 m) long and 66 feet (20 m) wide, erected 200 feet (61 m) back from North Clinton Avenue with the expectation that a larger church would eventually be built fronting the avenue. On February 1, 1874, Father Fridolin Pascalar, a German-born Jesuit priest, was appointed pastor to succeed Father Pingel. The first church was dedicated on Sunday, March 8, 1874. In 1878, the parish erected a brick rectory with stone trim adjacent to the first church building, fronting on Evergreen Street (now housing the St. Frances Xavier Cabrini Parish offices).

The surrounding neighborhood, known locally as "Butterhole," was home to Rochester's German dairy community from the 19th century into the mid-20th century.

=== Construction of the present church (1887–1890) ===
In 1888, a petition was approved to build the present church, and the parish hired Adolphus Druiding as architect. Druiding (1838–1900) was a prominent German-born architect who studied at the Polytechnic School in Munich and trained in Berlin; his body of work, alongside that of Franz Georg Himpler, constitutes the largest collection of German Catholic ecclesiastical architecture in the United States from the post-Civil War period to 1900.

Druiding designed the church in the Gothic Revival style in the form of a Latin cross, 177 feet (54 m) long and 92 feet (28 m) wide at the transept. The most prominent feature of the façade is the grand tower, which rises 246 feet (75 m) and is surmounted by a long tapering spire topped with a gilded cross 10 feet (3.0 m) high. The façade has three front entrances, each surmounted by a gable decorated with original wrought iron crosses featuring filigree designs.

Lockport sandstone and Medina brownstone for the exterior walls were transported to Rochester by barge via the Erie Canal. The building was designed to seat 1,100 parishioners. Construction cost approximately US$150,000 (equivalent to roughly $5,375,000 in 2026). The church was completed and dedicated in 1890.

=== Later history ===
Under Pastor Pascalar, the parish also supported Rochester's growing Polish Catholic community. In 1887, the Society of St. Casimir, a group of Polish families, received permission to worship at St. Michael's while planning their own parish. Pascalar served as their treasurer and assisted in the incorporation of St. Stanislaus Kostka Church, which was dedicated on November 16, 1890. In 1891, Bishop McQuaid sent Pascalar to recruit young German and Polish women for the Sisters of St. Joseph to serve at St. Stanislaus Kostka Church. Pascalar resigned due to failing health in April 1896 and returned to Württemberg, where he died on February 12, 1899.

Beginning in the 1960s, the neighborhood around the church changed significantly due to urban renewal, urban unrest, and suburban migration. The early arrival of Hispanic residents transformed the parish's character. The first Mass in Spanish was offered in July 1967 during the pastorate of Father Benedict Ehman. Today, the North Clinton Avenue neighborhood is home to New York State's second-largest Hispanic population, and St. Michael's continues to serve this community with all Masses celebrated in Spanish.

== Architecture and interior ==
=== Stained glass ===
The church contains 15 large stained glass windows depicting scenes from the Old and New Testaments in red, blue, green, and gold. The windows were created by the Tiroler Glasmalerei (Tyrolean Glass Painting Institute) in Innsbruck, Austria, and depict angelic interventions in human life. One window, Daniel in the Lion's Den, won first prize in the Religious Stained-Glass Exhibit at the 1893 Chicago World's Fair. Another window, The Three Kings at the Nativity, includes portrait likenesses of Bishop McQuaid (as the magus in red velvet and ermine) and Father Pascalar (as the shepherd in green).

=== Bells and tower ===
The tower contains 13 bells; the largest, named "Johannes," weighs 4,800 pounds (2,200 kg), and the smallest weighs 127 pounds (58 kg). The bells were manufactured by the Meneely and Kimberly Foundry and the McShane Bell Foundry. Each bell was christened by Bishop McQuaid and assigned a specific function, such as tolling for funerals or fire emergencies. The bells were fully refurbished in 2006. All 13 are playable from a keyboard, and three can be rung by rope pullers. The tower also features a clock with four faces, which was restored in 2003.

=== Organ ===
The pipe organ was built by J. W. Steere & Son Organ Company of Springfield, Massachusetts, and contains 2,169 pipes.

=== Other features ===
Notable interior furnishings include a processional cross (refurbished in 1986) and a baptismal font featuring illustrations of the Seven Sacraments and the four Evangelists, topped by a statue of John the Baptist baptizing Jesus; the font was restored in 2003. The church also features self-supporting spiral staircases leading to the choir loft.

== Pastors ==
Pastor	Years of service
Fr. Fridolin Pascalar	1874–1896
Fr. Mathias J. Hargather	1896–1929
Fr. Frederick Schied	1929–1934
Msgr. Arthur F. Florack	1935–1961
Fr. Benedict A. Ehman	1961–1974
Fr. Anthony Valente and Fr. Paul Freemesser (co-pastors)	1974–1980
Fr. John Dillon	1980–1982
Vincent Panepinto (administrator)	1982–1991
Sr. Kay Schwenzer and Fr. Laurence C. Tracy (co-administrators)	1991–1993
Fr. Dennis J. Shaw	1993–2002
Fr. Peter Deckman	2002–2005

Source: St. Frances Xavier Cabrini Parish

== Gallery ==
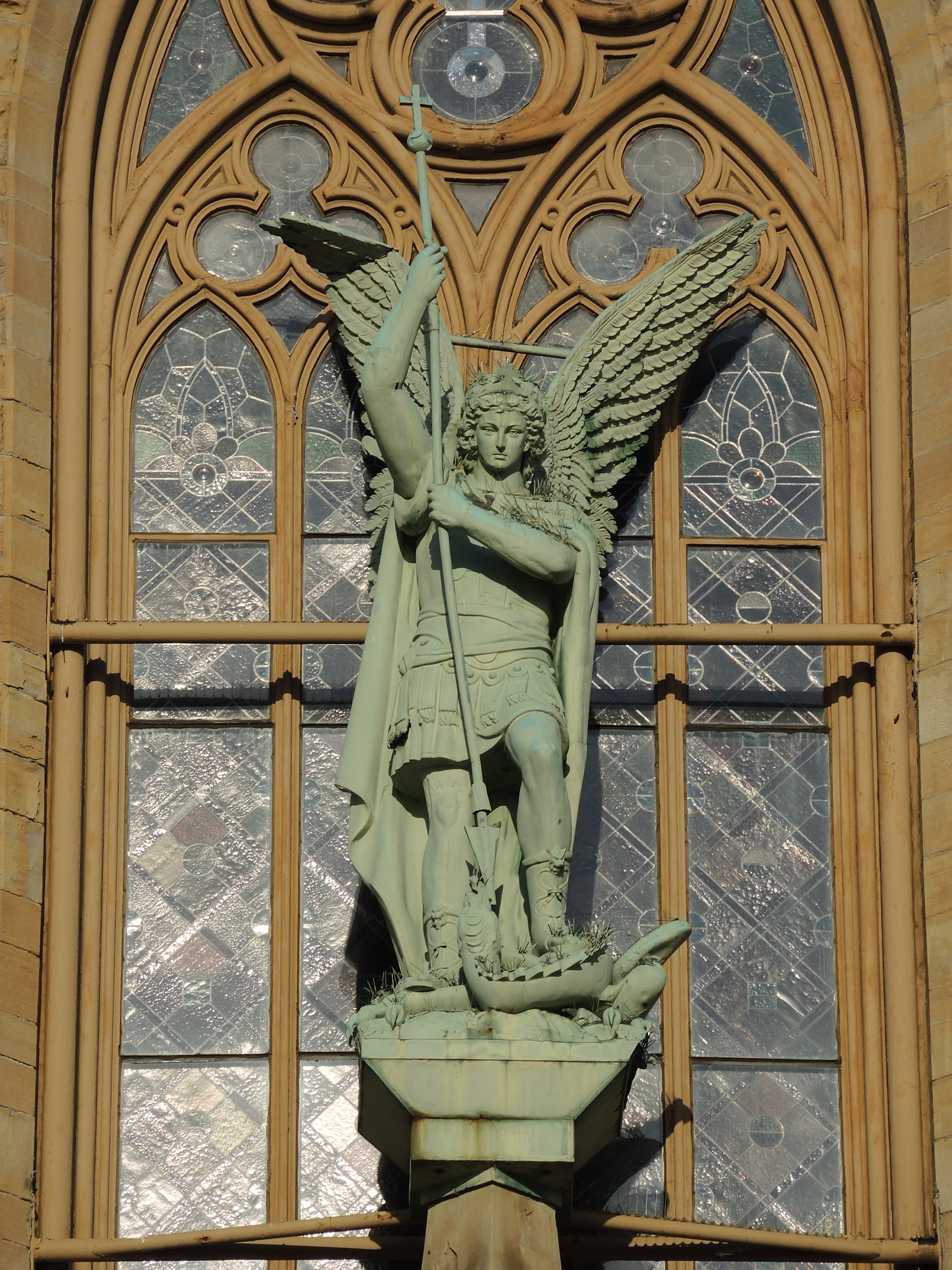

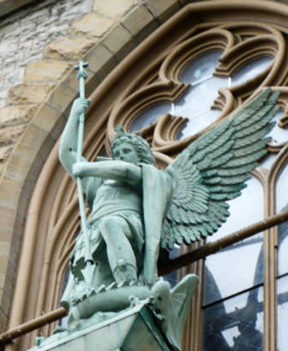

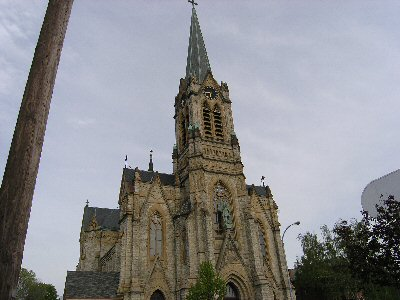

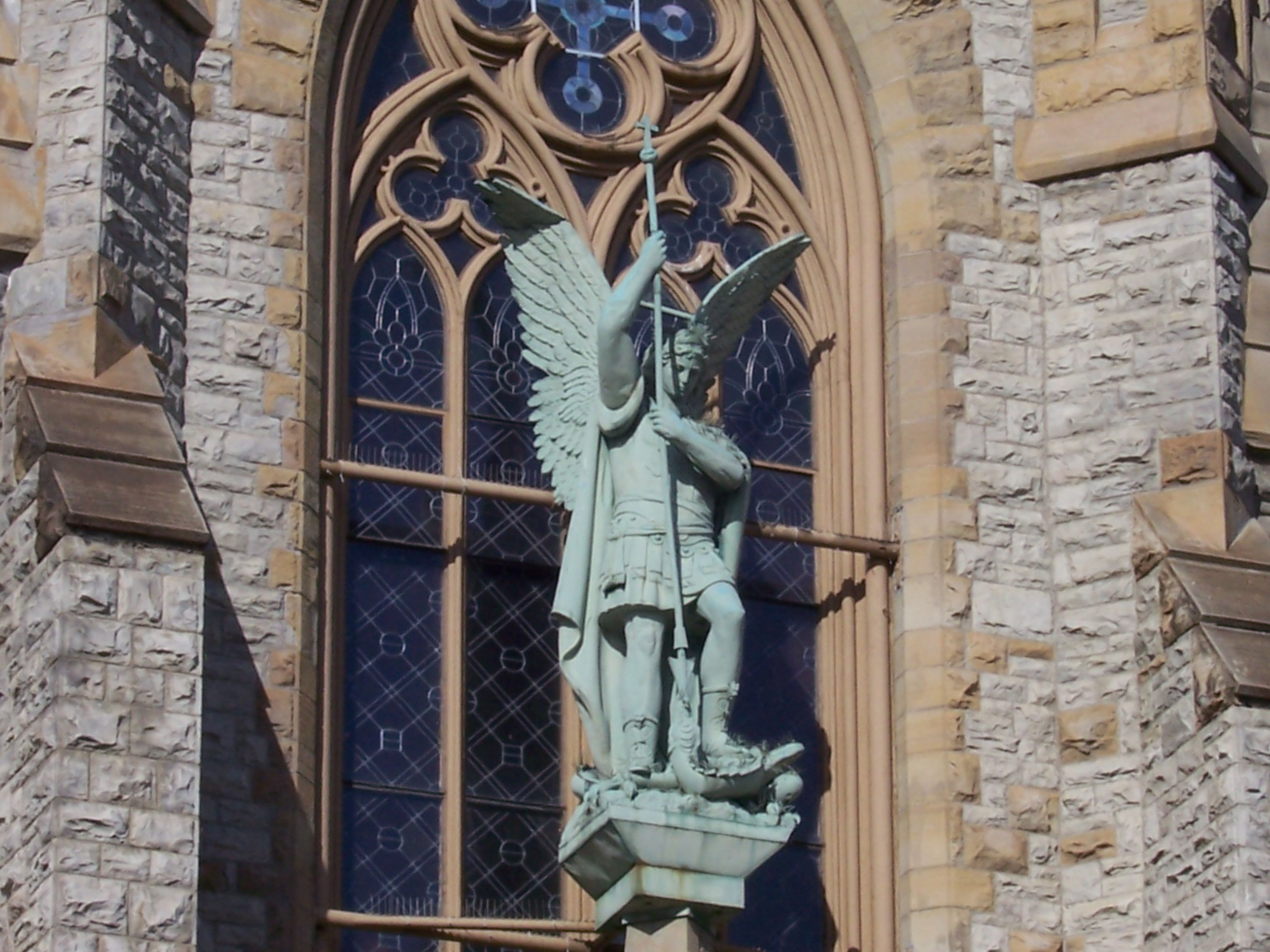

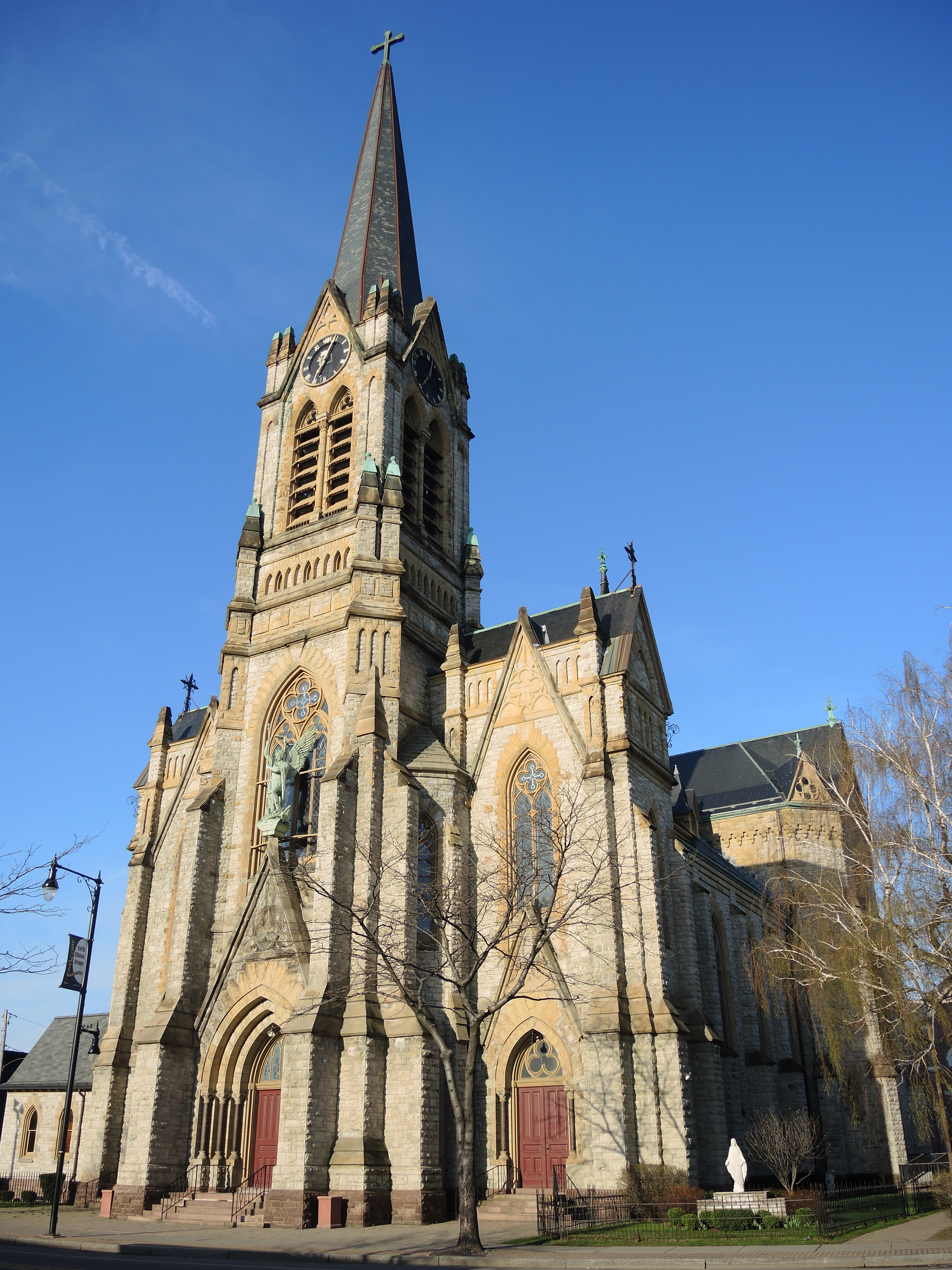

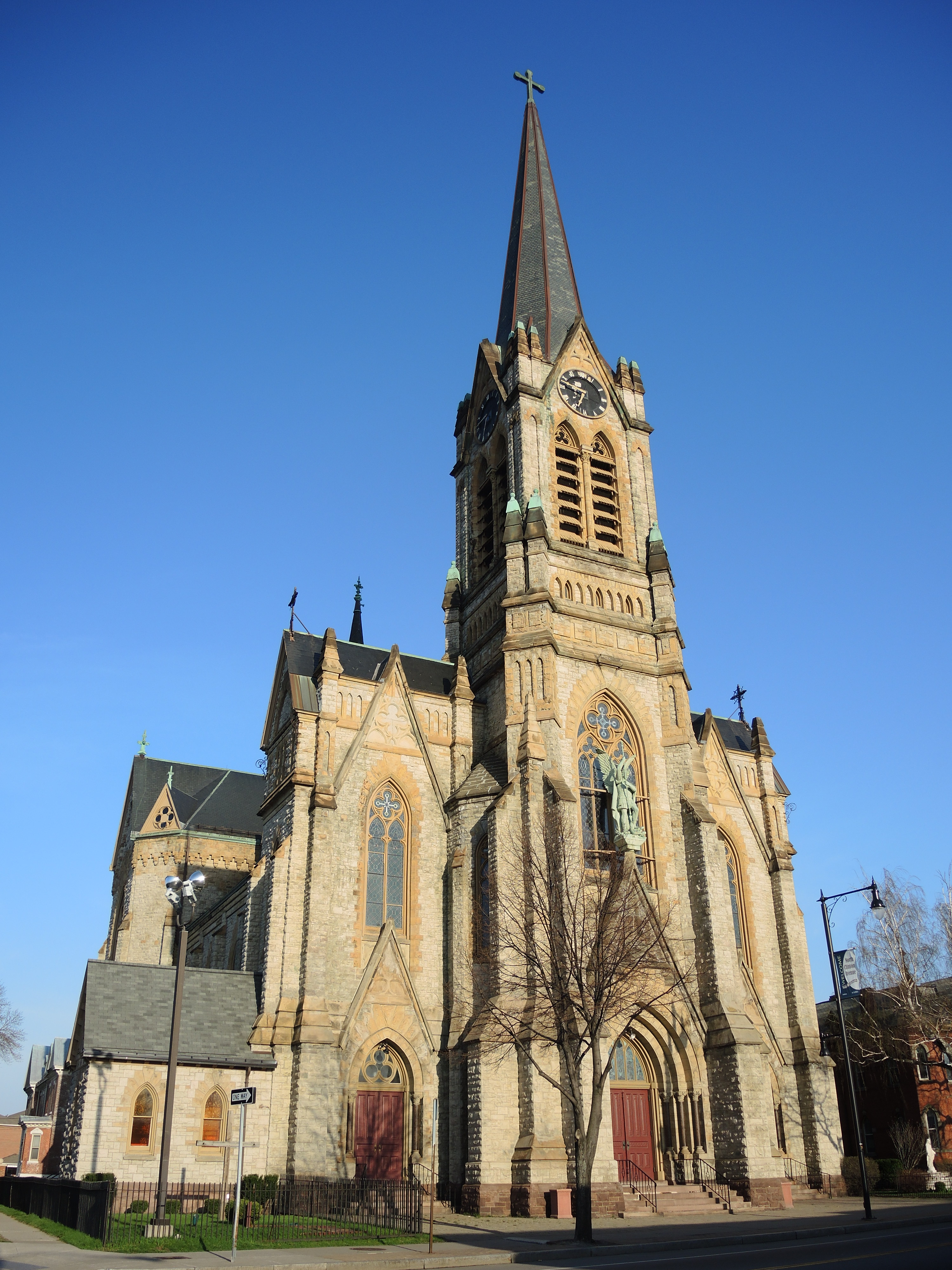

== See also ==
- List of tallest buildings in Rochester, New York
- Adolphus Druiding
- Fridolin Pascalar
- Roman Catholic Diocese of Rochester

Records
Preceded by Powers Building	Tallest building in Rochester, NY; 246 feet (75 m); 1890–1914	Succeeded by Kodak Tower
