= JT Bowen =

- Born: October 12, 1947; Rochester, New York, United States
- Origin: Crisfield, Maryland, United States
- Genres: R&B, rock and roll, soul
- Occupation: Musician
- Years active: 1960–present

JT Bowen (born John Bowen; October 12, 1947) is an American R&B singer in the style of Otis Redding and Wilson Pickett, and is best known as the lead singer of the band Clarence Clemons & The Red Bank Rockers.

== Early life ==
Born in Rochester, New York to Frank and Geneva Bowen, Bowen had spent his early childhood in the Port Norris section of Commercial Township, New Jersey, in Brielle, New Jersey and in Crisfield, Maryland. He was raised from nine months old by Delacy Justice, a Jazz singer, and Henry Ellington, a Gospel singer. He had moved from Port Norris to Brielle in 1954, and then to Crisfield, MD in 1959. He began singing at an early age, first starting out singing in local church choirs with Ellington at the age of 7 in the Port Norris area, and had continued to sing in church choirs throughout his childhood.

== Career ==
=== 1960-1980 ===
In 1960, Bowen got his start singing with a local band, The Rockets in Maryland where he had gone by the name of Little Johnny Redding, the moniker arising from his emulation of Otis Redding’s style. His adoption of this nickname was also due to him being the youngest member of the band, with all of the other members being at least ten years his senior. He stayed with The Rockets until he moved to Lakewood Township, New Jersey, in 1965. It was during his tenure with The Rockets that he met Clarence Clemons, who was attending Maryland State College and was moonlighting with the band The Vibratones. Bowen and Clemons would frequent each other's bands early on, which helped foster a 50-year musical relationship. After moving to Lakewood, New Jersey, Bowen was drafted into the US Army in December, 1966 and served on the Korean Demilitarized Zone until 1968, where he had reached the rank of SP-4.

Upon Bowen’s honorable discharge in 1968, he had started singing as lead vocalist of Soul Flame, a local Asbury Park, New Jersey West Side R&B and Soul band, from 1968 to 1970. Then, after leaving Soul Flame, Bowen became the lead vocalist of the Chosen Few, another Asbury Park West Side R&B band from 1969 to 1976. Around the period 1970-71, Clarence Clemons also played with the Chosen Few before moving on to work with Bruce Springsteen. After his time singing with the Chosen Few, Bowen joined the band Surrender in 1976 as lead vocalist until 1981.

=== 1980-1995 ===
In 1980, Bowen had been invited by Scarlet Rivera to sing vocals for the first time on a record album for the song “Lift Away”, which was on Rivera's Jerry Wexler-produced second album: Scarlet Fever. Then, upon Clemons’ opening Big Man's West, a nightclub in Red Bank, New Jersey, Bowen started working as the doorman. Around this time in 1981, Clemons had asked Bowen to join him as lead vocalist for the Red Bank Rockers, where he would sing lead on their debut album Rescue, which featured "Woman's Got the Power" and a Bruce Springsteen composition, "Savin' Up".

The Red Bank Rockers would tour extensively between 1981 and 1984, including an appearance on the Alan Thicke's late night TV show Thicke of the Night. Also during this period, Bowen lent his vocals to Little Steven & the Disciples of Souls album Men Without Women, the Bruce Springsteen-produced Gary U.S. Bonds album On the Line and the Garry Tallent of the E Street Band-produced album We've Got the Love.

One of the highlights of Bruce Springsteen's 1985 Born in the U.S.A. multi-night Meadowland's engagement at Giants Stadium was JT's appearance singing “Woman’s Got the Power” alongside Springsteen . Bowen had fronted many bands as well during this period: notably The Shore Patrol with Asbury Jukes Saxophone player Ed Manion and former E Street drummer Ernest Carter. In the early 1990s, he also had toured Japan with the band Joey Leone's Chop Shop.

=== 2010s ===
In Jan 2011, he performed at Clarence Clemons 69th Birthday Bash at the Hard Rock Cafe Seminole in Hollywood, Fla. He then reemerged on the Asbury Park Music Scene on April 3, 2011, with a sold out Stone Pony show with the Sensational Soul Cruisers. On July 17, 2011, Bowen and the Soul Cruisers were joined on stage at the Wonder Bar by Bruce Springsteen at a tribute show to Clarence Clemons. On October 22, 2011, he joined Springsteen again at the Stone Pony for the Third Annual Boston College Bar Band Bash.
