= RXKNephew =

American rapper (born 1994)

- Also known as: Rx Nephew; RXK Nephew; DrugRixh Nephew; Slitherman; Neph; Brisko Slice; Mr. Been Ballin; Too Tuff Tony; Slow Lane Larry
- Born: Kristopher Kevon Williams; February 1, 1995 (age 31)
- Origin: Rochester, New York
- Genres: Hip-hop; trap; alternative hip-hop; plugg
- Occupations: Rapper; songwriter; record producer
- Member of: Neph & Pap

Kristopher Kevon Williams, known professionally as RXKNephew (formerly DrugRixh Nephew and Rx Nephew), is an American rapper, songwriter and record producer from Rochester, New York. He is known for his prolific musical output and for his collaborations with fellow Rochester rapper Rx Papi.

== Early life ==
RXKNephew was raised in Rochester, New York. He was born when his mother was seventeen years old and raised primarily by his grandmother.

== Career ==
RXKNephew is noted for his prolific output, having released over 400 songs in 2021 alone. One of his most notable releases is the nine-minute song "American TTerroristt" (2020), which received acclaim from critics and which Pitchfork put at number 2 on their 2023 list of "The Hundred Best Songs of the 2020s So Far". His 2021 studio album Slitherman Activated also received coverage from media outlets such as Pitchfork. In June 2025, he released a diss track addressed to John Fetterman, a U.S. Senator from Pennsylvania, after being commissioned to write and record the song by Will Menaker, one of the co-hosts of the left-wing podcast Chapo Trap House.

== Music ==
RXKNephew is noted for his use of "atypical beats", incorporating influences from techno, house, hip house, and horrorcore. His lyrical content has been said to capture a sense of "omnipresent paranoia [...] undercut by a sadistically absurd sense of humour", juxtaposing imagery of death and violence (often inspired by real events of his life) with absurd punchlines. In addition, his writing is often provocative, at times "flagrantly offensive". For instance, his work contains references to controversial conspiracy theories on subjects such as the COVID-19 vaccine and the election of Joe Biden, as well as references to other rappers, such as Lil Reese, E-40, and King Von.

He has frequently been compared by critics to California rapper Lil B, with comparisons drawn between their quantity of output and stream of consciousness or "off-the-cuff" rapping style.

RXKNephew has made multiple collaborations with fellow Rx collective member Rx Papi. The duo have previously produced music under the name Neph & Pap and released a collaborative EP in 2020 entitled Oh Shit That's Nep & Pap There They Go.

== Discography ==
=== Studio albums ===
- Schizophrenia (2019)
- Rixh Nephew (2019)
- The White Room (2019)
- The Slither Man (2019)
- Rx Nephew (2019)
- Slitherman 2 (2019)
- Dominican Plug (2019)
- New Breed Trapper (2019)
- Murder Death Kill (2020)
- New Breed Trapper 1.5 (2020)
- Uncle Aron Told Me (2020)
- 2045 Quarantine (2020)
- Paranormal Traptivity (2020)
- Crack Therapy (2020)
- Slither Link Up (2020)
- Slitherman 4 President (2020)
- I Forgot What I Was Thinking (2020)
- Super Slither (2020)
- Crack Therapy 4 (2020)
- Tuff Tony (2020)
- Crack Therapy 3 (2020)
- Yay Allen (2021)
- Listen Here Are You Here to Hear Me (2021)
- Shawty Rxk Too (2021)
- Bro Ham (2021)
- Slitherman Activated (2021)
- You at Thuff Tony on a Tuesday (2021)
- Crack Dreams (2021)
- Crack Dreams 2 (2021)
- Make Drunk Cool Again (2021)
- Too Tuff Tone Tarantinno (2021)
- Slither Smoke (2021)
- Shawty Rxk Too 2 (2021)
- Transporter 4 (2021)
- On the Run from Area 51 (2021)
- Crack Dreams 3 (2022)
- My Wrist Need Rehabilitation (2022)
- On the Run from Area 51 (2022)
- Gta House in the Hills (2022)
- Welcome 2 the Queit Storm (2022)
- 2:22 (2022)
- Eternally Ballin (2022) (with FastLaneRome)
- 2:22.2, Pt. 2 (2022)
- Universal Slither (2022)
- Burberry Neph (2022)
- 1:33 (2022)
- Dirtier Than Bosstop N Dirty Dee (2022)
- Till I'm Dead (2023)
- Ready 2 Ball (2023)
- Summer in Miami (2023)
- Drunk Nights (2023) (prod. BANNED4GOOD)
- Neph Crockett (2023)
- Rxk Juice Lord (2023) (with Yung Deco)
- Shawty RXK Too 3 (2023)
- The ONEderful Nephew (2023) (with DJ Rude One)
- Certified Alcoholic (2023)
- Life After Neph (2023) (with Harry Fraud)
- Born 2 Die (2024)
- Mind Yo Fucking Business (2024)
- Till I'm Dead 2 (2024)
- Slitherman for President (2024)
- Always Remember Me (2024)
- Dead Fresh (2024)
- S.C.O.D. (2024) (with Big Emm)
- Beat Placement Warrior (2025)
- Slither Not Slime (2025)
- My Side Bitch Beat My Main Bitch Up Now My Side Bitch Is My Main Bitch (2025)
- My Side Bitch Beat My Main Bitch Up Now My Side Bitch Is My Main Bitch Pt. 2 (2025)
- This Ain’t For The Kids (2025)
- Glocks In Ohio (2025) (with G Malio)
- I Am Not Myself (2025)
- Trap One Day (2025)
- From Da 99 2 dA 2000's (2025)
