= Ryan Pettinella =

American-Italian basketball player

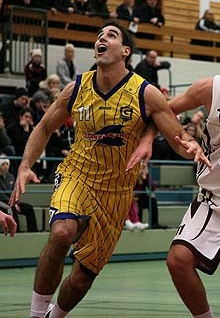

Personal information
- Born: July 12, 1984 (age 42) Rochester, New York
- Listed height: 6 ft 9 in (2.06 m)
- Listed weight: 245 lb (111 kg)

Career information
- High school: McQuaid Jesuit (Rochester, New York)
- College: Penn (2003–2005); Virginia (2006–2008)
- NBA draft: 2008: undrafted
- Playing career: 2008–2014
- Position: Power forward

Career history
- 2008–2009: Sutor Montegranaro
- 2009: Prima Veroli
- 2009–2010: Vigo Básquet
- 2010–2013: UMF Grindavík
- 2013–2014: Recanati

Career highlights
- Icelandic League champion (2012, 2013)

Ryan Pettinella (born July 12, 1984) is a retired American-Italian professional basketball player. He stands 6'9" tall, weighs 245 lbs, and played as a forward-center. He played in the Italian Lega Basket Serie A with Premiata Montegranaro and was a two-time national champion with Icelandic club UMF Grindavík.

== High school ==
Pettinella graduated in 2003 from McQuaid Jesuit High School. He earned New York All-State selections for basketball in both his junior and senior year. During his senior season Pettinella led McQuaid Jesuit to the New York Class A State Championship, a 27-1 record, and a third ranking nationally in the USA Today poll.

== College ==
Upon graduation, Pettinella enrolled at The Wharton School, University of Pennsylvania where he played two years for head coach Fran Dunphy before transferring to the University of Virginia. At Penn he helped lead the Quakers to an Ivy League Championship in 2005. The following year Pettinella transferred to Virginia where he played his final two seasons with the Cavaliers. In 2007 the Cavaliers won the ACC Regular Season Championship. Pettinella achieved a degree in political science and foreign affairs.

== Professional career ==
After graduating from Virginia in 2008, Pettinella signed with Premiata Montegranaro of the Italian Lega Basket Serie A. The following season, Ryan played in Spain for Ciudad de Vigo Básquet.

In 2010 Pettinella signed with UMFG Grindavík of the Icelandic Úrvalsdeild karla. He continued the following two seasons with Grindavik winning back to back national championships.

In August 2013, Pettinella returned to Italy joining Basket Recanati of the Italian Serie A2 Basket.
