= Che Holloway =

American actor

- Born: Chequan Tyreek Holloway; August 5, 1990 (age 35); Rochester, New York City, U.S.
- Occupation: Actor
- Years active: 2012–present

Chequan Tyreek Holloway (born August 5, 1990) is an American actor known for his three-season stint as Officer Amir Johnson in the comedy web series Dark Justice.

== Early life and education ==
Holloway was born August 5, 1990, in the city of Rochester, New York.

In his teen years, Holloway majored in acting at Rochester's School of The Arts and attended the Geva Theatre Center's Summer acting academy for two sessions in 2007 and 2009. As a college student, he attended New York City's American Musical and Dramatic Academy from 2010-2011.

== Acting career ==
Holloways break role happened in 2012 when he co-starred in an episode of the Oprah Winfrey Network show Unfaithful: Stories of Betrayal, where he played Kacey, half of a married couple struggling to save their relationship after it's jeopardized by infidelity. Afterward, Holloway appeared on stage in roles such as that of Tom Robinson in a stage adaptation of Harper Lee's classic To Kill A Mockingbird at the Bristol Valley Theatre in Naples, New York. Holloway has starred in multiple web series including his role as a reformed criminal forced to keep his family afloat by taking on a potentially fatal last job in the 2014 crime drama short PRESSURE, directed by Reginald Altidor.

In 2016, Holloway started the first of a three-season run on the social issues-focused satire Dark Justice, written and created by Mike Gerbino where he appeared as Amir Johnson, who as the only Black cop on an all-white local police force deals with its inherent racial discrimination while trying to serve and protect his community. Holloway's performance in the series earned him a nomination for Best Actor at the ROC Awards.
