= Stingray (film) =

1978 film by Richard Taylor

- U.S. theatrical poster by John Solie
- Directed by: Richard Taylor
- Written by: Richard Taylor
- Produced by: Bill L. Bruce; Donald R. Ham
- Starring: Christopher Mitchum; Les Lannom; William Watson; Sherry Jackson
- Cinematography: Frank Miller
- Edited by: Richard Taylor
- Music by: J. A. C. Redford; Byron Berline; Murray MacLeod
- Production company: International Cinema
- Distributed by: AVCO Embassy Pictures
- Release date: June 30, 1978
- Running time: 105 minutes
- Country: United States
- Language: English
- Budget: $1 million
- Box office: $1.1 million

Stingray is a 1978 action comedy film written and directed by Richard Taylor and starring Christopher Mitchum, Les Lannom, William Watson and Sherry Jackson. The plot concerns two buddies who buy a Corvette Stingray from a used car lot, and must fend off the criminals who stashed their loot inside. Along with Corvette Summer, it was one of two films centered around the Stingray to be released in June 1978, and was the subject of a feud with MGM over the use of the title. For some ancillary markets, it was re-titled Abigail: Wanted.

== Plot ==
Murray Lonigan and Tony Agrosio are two drug dealers en route to a sale. After finding out that the two buyers planted a "homer" tracking device inside the briefcase containing their $1,000,000 payment, they gun both of them down. The commotion attracts the attention of the police Desperate, they store both the money and drugs inside a Corvette Stingray on a used car lot. Police lieutenant Herschel, who suspects Murray and Tony, has them taken to his precinct for questioning. Without proof, he has to let them go but orders his partner Sgt. Murphy to follow them. Soon after, Murray and Tony are joined by their boss Abigail Bratowski, a wanted woman disguised as a nun, and Rosco, another of Abigail's men. The three head manage to lose Murphy and head to the car lot.

Much to their dismay, they find out that the car is being bought by two buddies, Al and Elmo. The gang gives chase, but Al mistakes them for street racers and quickly gets pulled over by two patrolmen for speeding. Fearing that the cops may find the illegal cargo, Abigail opens fire, killing the cops, but Al and Elmo escape. Lonigan decides to purchase a tracker so they can geolocate the homer inside the Stingray. When they catch up with them again, along with Herschel and Murphy in a police car, another chase ensues, which ends with Herschel's car getting disabled by a fallen ladder and Abigail demanding Lonigan to pull over so she can change out of her nun costume. Thinking that they lost them, Al and Elmo pull the car into a service station. Elmo notices bags of heroin in the backseat and persuade him that they should peddle the heroin for money themselves. As they begin to leave, Abigail and her crew arrive. Al immediately peels out of the station with Lonigan and Tony in tow, leaving Elmo to flee through nearby woods with Abigail and Rosco on his tail.

Following another chase, Al loses his pursuers in a construction site by temporarily disabling Lonigan's car with a bulldozer. Meanwhile, in the woods, Elmo narrowly escapes Abigail, who mistakenly kills Rosco with her machine gun. Elmo steals a motorcycle from a couple. Abigail takes their other one, but crashes and loses Elmo once more. She eventually meets up with Lonigan and Tony at the construction site. She frees the car from the bulldozer and the chase resumes. As night falls, Al decides stop a stop at a bar called Ronnie B's, where Elmo joins him. But Abigail, Lonigan, and Tony track them down thanks to the homer. Abigail violently rebuffs a patron who hit on her, triggering an all-out brawl. This allows Al and Elmo to steal a machine gun from her, sneak out and escape in the Corvette once more. Exasperated, Tony and Murray turn on Abigail and try to run her over, but get chased away by her gunfire. Shortly after, Herschel and Murphy arrive in the bar and the former orders an APB be put out on Abigail and her gang.

The next day, Al and Elmo drive back into the city and pick up a hitchhiking girl. Elmo decides that the only way to lay low is to change the car's color. Meanwhile, Abigail carjacks an Austin-Healey and shoots the driver dead. She finds Lonigan and Tony, and stabs the former to death. She spares Tony, provided that he will share the million dollars with her. Al and Elmo accidentally pull the Corvette into a car wash, causing the new paint job to wash away. Abigail and Tony show up for another chase, which concludes in a dead end. A three-way gun battle ensues, during which Tony turns on Abigail, intending to keep the money for himself, but gets shot dead. Abigail tries to bolt out in the Corvette but she is accidentally killed when her own gun, stolen by Al and left in the door, accidentally discharges. Herschel and Murphy arrive on the scene while the girl manages to hide the drugs briefcase from them. Later on, Al and Elmo find the case gone, stolen by a bum. They chase after him, but Al falls into the river and sinks. Elmo blames himself for being too greedy and causing his friend's death, just as he notices Al's body floating over to the shore. He runs over and discovers Al was only playing dead. After debating what they should do with the money, they decide on a vacation to Bolivia.

== Cast ==
- Christopher Mitchum as Al
- Les Lannom as Elmo
- William C. Watson as Lonigan
- Sherry Jackson as Abigail Bratowski
- Cliff Emmich as Roscoe
- Bert Hinchman as Tony
- Sondra Theodore as Girl
- Richard Cosentino as Lt. Herschel
- Harry Gorsuch as Sgt. Murphy
- Morgan Hatch as Slim
- Steve Snyder as Bug
- Anthony Miller as Krueger

John Carl Buechler has a cameo as a bar patron who gets his crotch set on fire by Abigail. Future Playboy Playmate Ruth Guerri also appears uncredited.

== Production ==
=== Development ===
The film was the directorial debut of Richard Taylor, who ran the motion picture production department at Southern Illinois University in Edwardsville. He had directed shorts and worked second unit on several features. Taylor left his faculty position when his involvement with the film meant that he could not do both. This script, written three years prior, was his first to get made after some twenty attempts. At the time, the titular Corvette Stingray was built at a plant on St. Louis' Union Boulevard. The film was conceived as a serious road thriller, rather than the satire it became. It was extensively rewritten when Hollywood actors were hired. Headlining the local cast was Burt Hinchman, a stage actor who parlayed this role into a career as a small-part film player.

Then St. Louis resident Peter Maris came across the script in January 1977. Although uncredited, he served as the movie's producer. It was made under the banner of Stingray Productions, a subsidiary of International Cinema Ltd., a fledgling outfit financed by real estate developers Bill Bruce and Donald Ham, and based inside Bruce's offices in Clayton. One source indicates that co-star Sherry Jackson served as a production consultant to the film's inexperienced staff. They hired veteran stunt driver Carey Loftin of Bullitt and The French Connection fame as stunt coordinator, beating MGM's competing project for his services. Noted special effects artist John Carl Buechler, who had done the make-up on Taylor's short film That Thing in the Basement, made his feature debut on Stingray.

=== Filming ===
Photography started on August 1, 1977, and wrapped up on October 7. The film was budgeted at slightly less than $1 million, but ended up getting into the seven figures. While the production staff was mostly local, much of the technical crew was imported from Los Angeles. The dailies were sent to Los Angeles and back, which made it longer to notice where pick-ups were needed. In addition to all his other duties, Taylor acted as sound engineer. Most of the film was shot in Edwardsville, Illinois, including the rock concert scene which took place at City Park. The nearby towns of Wood River and Alton were also visited. Alton was supposed to be the prime location due to hilly terrain that lent itself to driving stunts, but the mayor refused. One car jump was shot in St. Charles, and the bulldozers were shot at West Lake Quarry. The finale was filmed in East St. Louis. Filming was scheduled to last six weeks, but suffered several delays.

The early part of the shoot was impacted by bad weather. The first two weeks, later expanded to three, were dedicated to stunts that did not require the cast's principals. Although they were described as "second unit lensing" by Variety, most were directed by Taylor himself. Some of the most complex scenes were shot at that time, such as the final plunge from the Eads Bridge into the Mississippi River. Former competitive diver Bobby Sargent, Burt Reynolds' double in Smokey and the Bandit, performed the drop. It was captured from four angles, although coverage is more limited in the final cut. The rock concert was mimed by members of the production staff. The unpaid extras were hard to come by, and the most committed to being in the movie—pensioners and children's parents—were not always the most responsive, causing crowd filming to stretch over eight hours. To get the stampede right, Taylor fired an unannounced blank shot, which got the desired reaction.

The leads were then flown in for main photography, now rescheduled across five weeks. To mitigate the weather, they focused on interiors first, but the script had few of them. Then, another three-week delay was incurred when Mitchum had to be rushed back home to be with his wife as she gave birth to his daughter. The producers told the actors to play it straight, as they wanted the film to be a deadpan spoof of the genre. Lannom had to make a visit to the hospital after he was blinded by gravel from an explosion. The titular car was a customized 1964 model. While the film did not benefit from the collaboration of General Motors, St. Louis-based distillery Anheuser-Busch "endorsed" the bar brawl featured in the film, and provided Budweiser labels for the candy glass bottles.

=== Post production ===
Taylor's first edit clocked in at nearly three hours before being brought down to a more conventional length, although the final shot selection sometimes came down to mistakes made during filming rather than artistic choices. After MPAA review, the film was further cut to secure a PG rating, mostly during graphic death scenes. A few conversations were trimmed late as well.

== Conflict with MGM ==
The project drew the hire of MGM, which was planning its own road movie based on the Stingray, and wanted the title for itself. Theirs was also officially sanctioned by General Motors. MGM had filed for the Stingray moniker with the MPAA. However, this was not a true trademark system, but a gentlemen's agreement to which only the five majors were signatories. While it meant that the film could not gain distribution with any of them, it was not binding to any independent outfit. Taylor insisted that he had settled on the name Stingray for his screenplay years before MGM did, and the producers retained the services of a Los Angeles law firm to defend their interests. They also offered to buy the title from MGM, to no avail. The studio vouched to use its marketing power to cement its claim in the public eye, while the independent Stingray hoped to beat its rival to the theaters. In the end, MGM released its film first, but changed its title to Corvette Summer.

== Release ==
=== Theatrical ===
Stingray was quick to find a domestic distributor in AVCO Embassy Pictures. The film had its world premiere at fourteen St. Louis area theaters on June 30, 1978. A parade of fifteen historic Stingray models, attended by co-stars Les Lannom and Sondra Theodore, took place at one of the locations. On the eve of the opening, a free Corvette race and a Miss Stingray contest were organized in partnership with radio KSLQ at St. Louis International Raceway. In drive-ins, the film headlined double or triple bills with other youth-oriented AVCO films, like Sidewinder 1 or The Chicken Chronicles.

==== Director's cut ====
A director's cut was released through the efforts of Skipper Martin, a colorist who grew up a fan of the film. Taylor lent his personal copy to the restoration effort, which still featured the violent footage cut before its original run. It premiered on April 20, 2019, at Edwardsville's Wildey Theatre.

=== Television ===
The film had its domestic TV premiere on premium cable channel HBO on May 8, 1979.

=== Home video ===
Stingray arrived on U.S. videotape courtesy of Magnetic Video Corporation. A retailer's advertisement dated June 17, 1979, mentions it in a list of "brand new video films." Some VHS re-issues in the U.S., U.K. and Australia have used the title Abigail: Wanted. Severin Films was mentioned as a possible distributor for the film's director's cut, but it was eventually released on Blu-ray by Dark Forces Entertainment on November 23, 2021.

== Reception ==
Stingray has received mixed reviews. Michael Blowen of The Boston Globe summed up Stingray as "a lemon." He complained that "Richard Taylor's direction is mundane. He relies on slow motion gimmickry, facile sight gags," while "the dialogue is always punctuated with bullet holes." John M. McGuire of the St. Louis Post-Dispatch assessed that the film only worked as a regional travelogue, having "all the qualities of a home movie" and the kind of dialogue he had not heard "since eighth grade recess." He concluded that "there is nothing we can do about it except pray that there is not a Stingray 2."

Joe Baltake of the Philadelphia Daily News dismissed it as "this week's car movie", finding the casting of Sherry Jackson as the villainess to be "a nice twist" in a tale otherwise steeped in a "banal, youth-oriented atmosphere." Kenneth Shorey of the Birmingham News praised Mitchum and Lannom's "appealing twosome" and the "bright and breezy" soundtrack, but felt that the action was "not lighthearted enough", as mean-spirited touches made the film "curiously offensive." Perry Stewart of the Fort Worth Star-Telegram found that although some aspects of the narrative were "done-to-death," "at times Stingray is an entertaining little movie." However, he noted that film was "at its best when it's being funny," and found it jarring to see people "getting 'smoked' so casually" in other scenes.

Chris Gladden of The Roanoke Times & World-News called the film "a bizarre send up of chase movies that may well become some kind of classic." He deemed that although "Taylor's direction bears the stamp of an amateur, it nonetheless propels the film with a crude vitality that not even some truly abysmal acting can bog down." He also praised "perversely humorous vignettes and a refreshing amorality at a time when many films built on sensation try to justify themselves with a message." Geoff Dale of The Hamilton Spectator found that "miracle of miracles, this comic little actioner rises above many of its competitors of the B-movie genre." While conceding that "the car chases at times seem to drag on and as always there is too much gratuitous violence," he commanded the "crisp, fast-paced direction" and "fine acting touches from some of the leads."

== Related works ==
1982's Mad Foxes was marketed by Swiss producer/distributor Erwin C. Dietrich as Stingray 2 to cash in on this film, but they have no connection to one another, other than the car the hero drives.
