= Harry Gorsuch =

American actor

- Occupation: Actor

Harry Gorsuch is an American stage and film actor who appeared in films from the late 1970s through to the mid-1980s.

== Film ==
Two films that he appeared in he played policemen. One was as Sergeant Murphy in Stingray with Christopher Mitchum and the other was as Capt. Hearn in the Peter Maris directed Delirium that starred Turk Cekovsky and Barron Winchester. Other films he appeared in were A Pleasure Doing Business that starred Conrad Bain and as Harry in On the Right Track with Norman Fell and Gary Coleman in 1981.

== Stage ==
Among his stage work, along with Jonnie King he appeared as Stosh in a 1967 stage production of Stalag 13.

== Roles ==
=== Film ===
- 1978 Stingray as Sergeant Murphy
- 1979 A Pleasure Doing Business as Mailman
- 1979 Delirium
- 1981 On the Right Track as Harry

=== Television ===
- 1980 Life on the Mississippi as Harry
- 1986 Jake and Mike as Manny Pinero
