= The Aquinas Institute of Rochester =

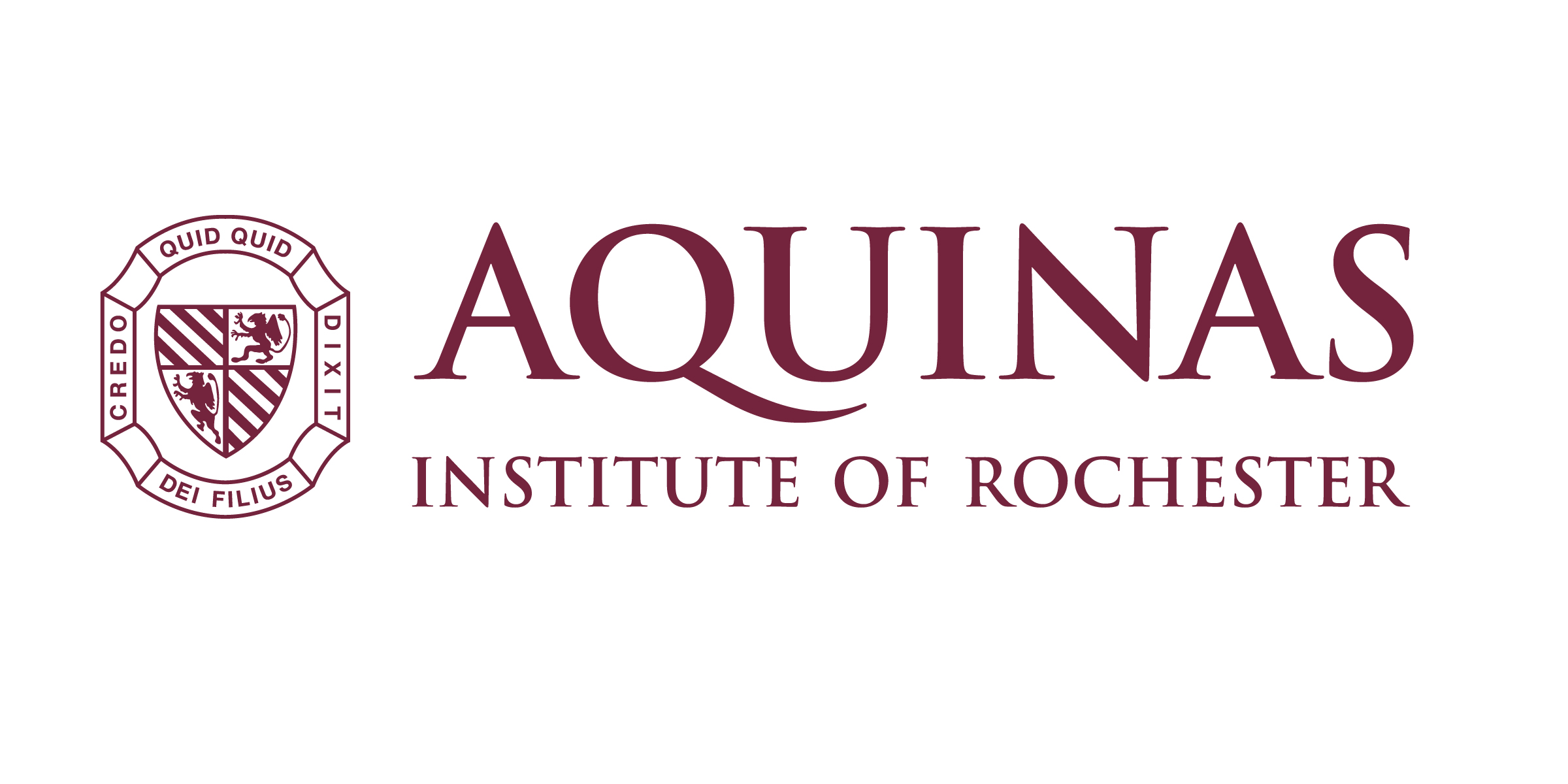

Location
- 1127 Dewey Avenue; Rochester, (Monroe County), New York 14613; United States; 43°11′15″N 77°38′23″W

Information
- Type: Private, Coeducational
- Motto: Credo Quid Quid Dixit Dei Filius. (I believe whatever the son of God has said)
- Religious affiliations: Roman Catholic, Basilian
- Established: 1902; 124 years ago
- President: David Eustis
- Principal: Theodore Mancini '88
- Staff: 51
- Faculty: 68
- Grades: 6-12
- Average class size: 25
- Student to teacher ratio: 15:1
- Colors: Maroon and White
- Mascot: Li'l Irish
- Rival: McQuaid Jesuit High School
- Accreditation: Middle States Association of Colleges and Schools
- Newspaper: Maroon & White
- Yearbook: Arete
- Endowment: ~$27 Million
- Tuition: $12,685 (Grades 9-11); $9,580 (Grades 6–8)
- Alumni: 19,000+
- Website: aquinasinstitute.com
- The Aquinas Institute of Rochester
- U.S. National Register of Historic Places
- Area: 13 acres (5.3 ha)
- Architect: J. Foster Warner
- Architectural style: Late 19th And 20th Century Revivals, Italian Renaissance
- NRHP reference No.: 89000464
- Added to NRHP: June 8, 1989

The Aquinas Institute of Rochester is a Catholic, private, college-preparatory, co-educational school educating in the Basilian tradition. The school is located in Rochester, New York, and was established in 1902. The Aquinas Institute was founded as the co-educational Cathedral Business School and in 1913 became Rochester Catholic High School, an all-male high school which it remained until 1982 when, after the closure of St. Agnes (an all girls school), Aquinas once again became co-ed. It is located within the City of Rochester. It has stood at its current location on Dewey Avenue since 1925. Over 19,000 have graduated since the school opening.

== Buildings on campus ==
The main school building is listed on the National Register of Historic Places.

The Wegman – Napier Building, an extension of the main school building, houses science labs for biology and chemistry classes, as well as a renovated gym. Aquinas' biology labs were refurbished in 2007, and a 30,000 sq ft (2,800 m^{2}) field house was built in 2008.

Aquinas constructed an on-campus stadium in 2005, sponsored by and named the Wegmans Sports Complex. The new stadium was built twenty years after its previous football stadium Holleder Memorial Stadium was demolished in 1985.

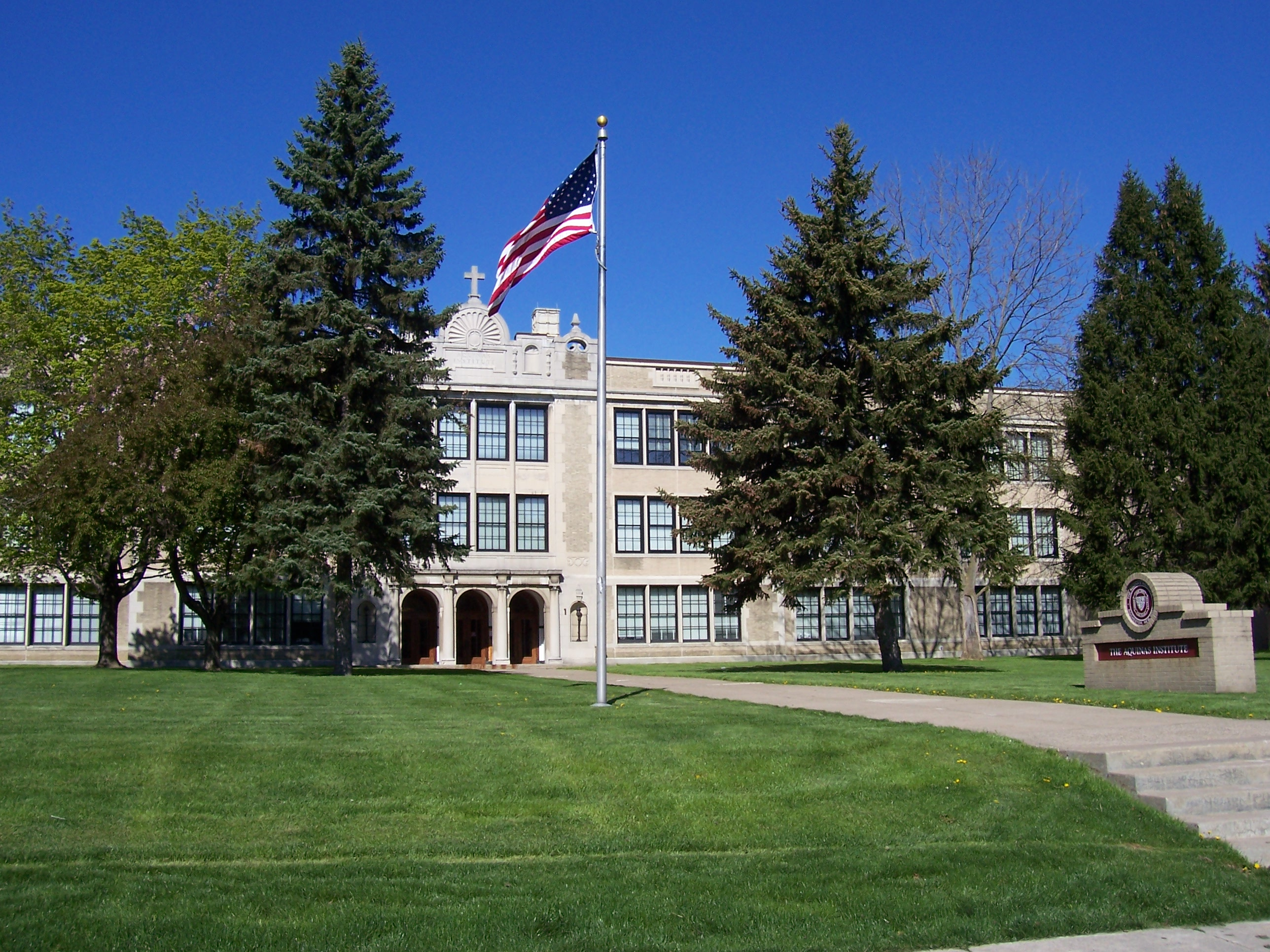
Front

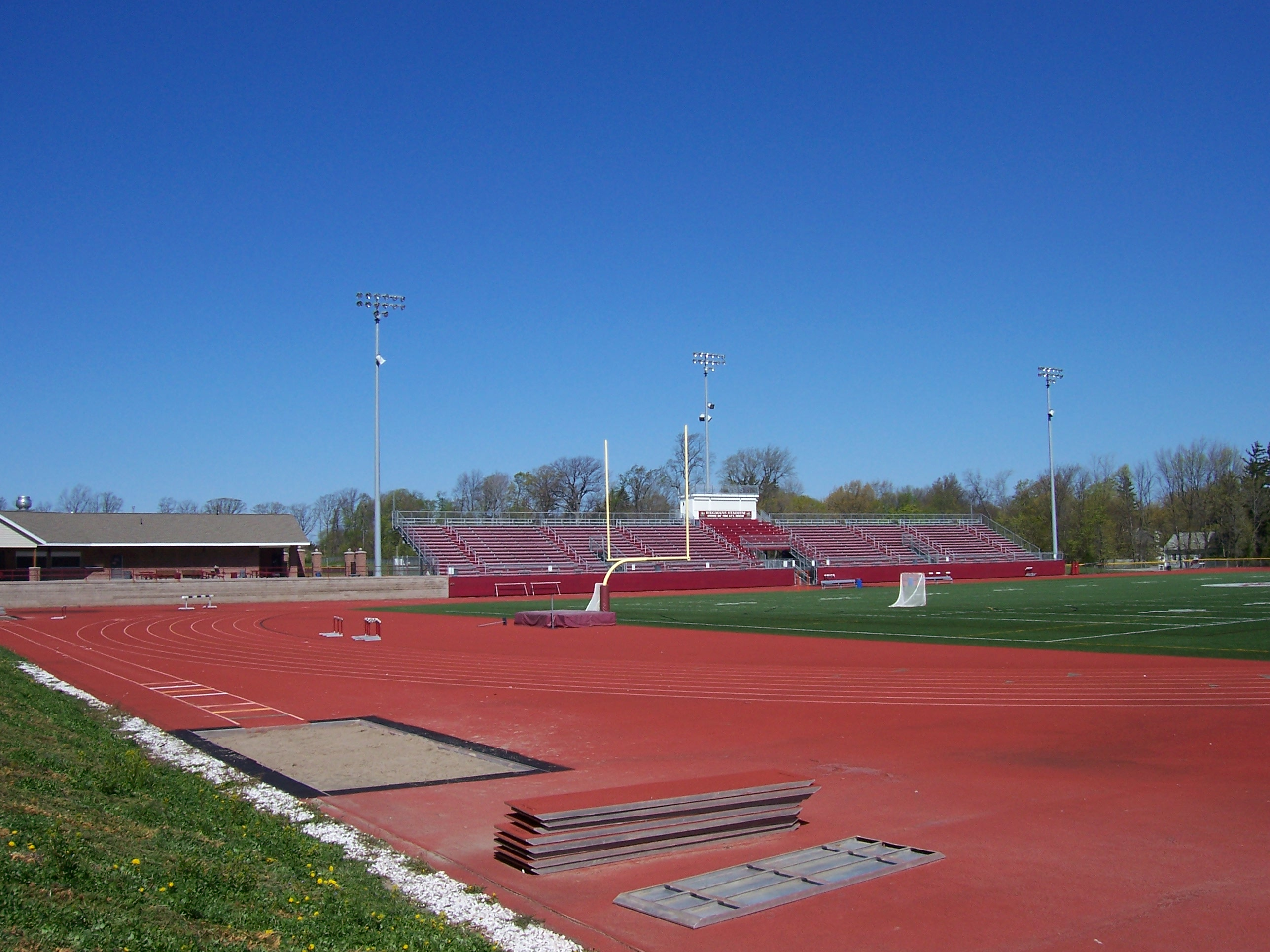
Track

== Notable alumni ==
- Bud Wiser, American director, producer and screenwriter.
- Chris Bostick, former professional baseball player
- Dick Buerkle, former world record holder in the Indoor 1 mile
- Robert Duffy, former New York Lieutenant Governor and former mayor and police chief of Rochester, New York
- Brian Gionta, former professional hockey player
- David J. Hayes, American attorney and legal scholar
- Don Holleder, West Point football star and Vietnam War hero
- Frank Judge, Editor & publisher, poet, translator, educator and arts administrator
- Nicholas Kehoe, President of the Congressional Medal of Honor Foundation
- Jamir Jones, Professional Football Player
- Kevin McMahan, former professional football player
- Donald Mark, New York Supreme Court Justice
- Jalen Pickett, professional basketball player
- John Porcari, former deputy secretary of transportation
- Vincent Ward, paralympic swimmer
- Robert Wegman, former CEO of Wegmans Food Markets
- Paul Napier, former American actor and board member of the Screen Actors Guild (SAG) who helped form the Screen Actors Guild Awards show first held in 1995
