= Les Lannom =

American actor and musician (born 1946)

- Born: Leslie Thomas Lannom; November 4, 1946 (age 79); Johnston City, Illinois, U.S.
- Education: Southern Illinois University
- Occupations: Actor, musician
- Years active: 1972–present
- Children: 1

Leslie Thomas "Les" Lannom (born November 4, 1946, Johnston City, Illinois) is an American voice artist and musician, and retired film and television actor. He is perhaps best known for playing Lester Hodges in the American private detective television series Harry O from 1974 to 1976, and his role as Sergeant Casper in the 1981 film Southern Comfort.

== Family ==
Les Lannom was born in Johnston City, Illinois in 1946, the only child of Dora (née Stout; 1922–2005) and Leslie Deneen Lannom (1922–1949) After his father's death, his mother married Edgar H. Roach on December 31, 1950. Edgar Roach died on November 3, 1989.

Les Lannom has one son, Leslie D. "Honcho" Lannom, and a granddaughter, Riley Lannom.

== Career ==
Lannom played Larry Penzoss in the 1985 television miniseries Space and played Bufe Coker in the 1978 television miniseries Centennial. Both miniseries were based on James A. Michener novels. He appeared in part V of the miniseries Roots: The Next Generations as Jake, a gas station operator. He also appeared in the film Silkwood (1983). Lannom portrayed Sergeant Casper in Walter Hills Southern Comfort.

He made guest appearances on such series as Columbo, Scarecrow and Mrs. King, CHiPs, Benson, Knots Landing, The Waltons, The Streets of San Francisco, The Six Million Dollar Man, Cannon,The Hardy Boys/Nancy Drew Mysteries, Judging Amy, The X Files, ER, NYPD Blue, and The Larry Sanders Show, among others.

From 2002 to 2006, he appeared onstage as Det. Brent Randall in Dark Legends in Blood. In 2007, he lent his considerable talent to the students of the Speech & Acting Team at his hometown high school in Johnston City, Illinois, acting as a volunteer assistant coach. In April 2008, he returned to the high school stage as "Vince Fontaine" in Grease.

An accomplished musician, Lannom plays bagpipes, guitar, trumpet, harmonica, and is a singer. He is currently enjoying semi-retirement in Johnston City, playing the pipes and teaming up with music partner, Holly Kee, to create the unique sound of ROISIN DUBH. Les and Holly teamed up as Narrator and Executive Producer of audiobooks for the Benjamin Tucker Mystery Series by author Harry James Krebs. The duo began a similar relationship with author Michael Phelps to produce audio versions for Phelps' two books about Lannom's friendship with Harry O co-star David Janssen for television director and producer, Jerry Thorpe. Most recently, he has been a voice actor to a website avatar, "Sport", on Pinnacle Sports.

== Filmography ==
Film
Year	Film	Role	Notes
1972	Prime Cut	O'Brien	
1975	Framed	Gary	
1978	Stingray	Elmo	Alternative title: Abigail Wanted
1981	Southern Comfort	Sgt. Casper	*it is Lannom's 'Casper' on the film's British DVD box cover; see IMDb
1983	Silkwood	Jimmy	
1987	Like Father Like Son	Coach Ellis	
1988	Shoot to Kill	Sheriff Dave Arnett	Alternative title: Deadly Pursuit
1997	The Pest	Bagpipe player	

Television
Year	Title	Role	Notes
1972–74	Cannon		2 episodes
1973	Kung Fu		1 episode
1973	The Rookies	Gifford	1 episode
1973–76	Harry O	Lester Hodges	6 episodes
1974	Chase	Ron Whitsett	1 episode
1974	Hitchhike!	Tim Moore	Television film
1975	The Streets of San Francisco	Off. Kevin Bryce	1 episode
1975	Someone I Touched	Frank	Television film
1975	Death Scream	Mr. Daniels	Television film
1976	Jeremiah of Jacob's Neck	Max	Television film
1976	Most Wanted		1 episode
1977	Baa Baa Black Sheep		1 episode
1977	The Hardy Boys/Nancy Drew Mysteries	George Tompkins	1 episode
1977	The Six Million Dollar Man		1 episode
1978	Lacy and the Mississippi Queen	Webber	Television film
1978	Zuma Beach	Stan	Television film
1978	Centennial	Bufe Coker	Miniseries
1978	Pearl	Chief Looper	Miniseries
1979	Elvis	Sonny West	Television film
1979	Roots: The Next Generations	Jake	Miniseries
1979	The Waltons	Sweet Billy	2 episodes
1980	Knots Landing	Music	1 episode
1980	The Chisholms	Jerry O'Neal	1 episode
1980	Benson	Bulldog	1 episode
1980	Gideon's Trumpet	Bobby Earle	Television film
1981	CHiPs	Janos	1 episode
1984	The Yellow Rose	Earl Yates	1 episode
1985	Space	Larry Penzos	Miniseries
1985	Scarecrow and Mrs. King	Russell Towne	1 episode
1987	Houston Knights		2 episodes
1988	Tour of Duty	SSG Exley	1 episode
1988	Police Story: Gladiator School	Mullins	Television film
1990	Columbo: Columbo Goes to College	Malloy	Television film
1991	Sons and Daughters	Bill Sanders	1 episode
1993	Johnny Bago	Donovan Brother #1	1 episode
1993	The Larry Sanders Show	Tech Guy, Stage hand	2 episodes
1996	Lois & Clark: The New Adventures of Superman	Rod Clemons	1 episode
1997	JAG	Dart Thrower	1 episode
1997	Beyond Belief: Fact or Fiction		1 episode
1997	NYPD Blue		1 episode
1999	Purgatory	Bartender	Television film
1999	ER	Neslen	1 episode
1999	Dr. Quinn Medicine Woman: The Movie	Ed Gordon	Television film
1999	The X-Files	Deputy Foster	episode: "Rush"
2000	Judging Amy	David Chaskin	1 episode
