= Admiral's Row =

Buildings in Brooklyn, New York

Coordinates: 40.6984°N 73.9794°W

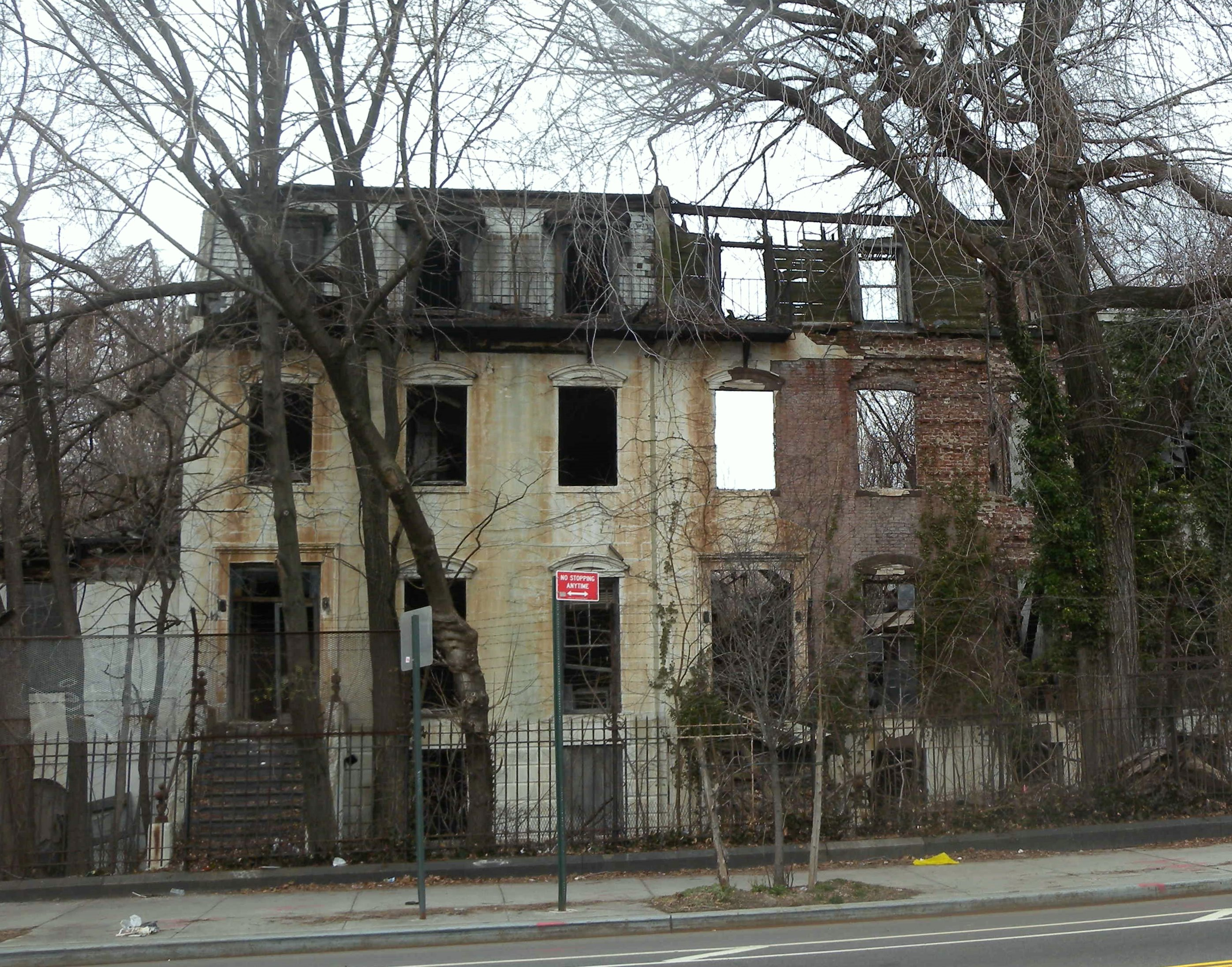
A decayed house on Admirals Row, before demolition (2012)

Admiral's Row was a row of ten homes formerly used by naval officers in the New York City borough of Brooklyn at the Brooklyn Navy Yard, and owned by the National Guard of the United States. The houses were built between 1864 and 1901.

Although the U.S. Navy closed the original Navy Yard in the mid-1960s, it continued to house some personnel in the officers' houses until the mid-1970s. Afterward, many of the buildings in Admiral's Row deteriorated to the point of collapse. Most of Admiral's Row was demolished in 2016 as part of a redevelopment of Brooklyn Navy Yard; only one house and a timber shed remain from the original row. A supermarket and an office building are being developed on the site of Admiral's Row.

== Designations ==
The property on which the row stood encompassed approximately 8 acres (32,000 m^{2}) and was located on Flushing Avenue near Navy Street, near the southwest corner of the yard.

Admiral's Row featured ten homes in various architectural styles (namely the Greek Revival, Italianate, and French Empire styles). They served as residences to high-ranking Navy Yard officers. The property also contained a timber shed, parade ground, tennis courts, and garages attached to each house. Each house contained a brick and stone cladding. A finished basement was located underneath each building, and the first floor of each structure was raised several feet above the ground, accessed by a stoop. Some of the houses had mansard roofs. Some of the residences were townhouses, divided into two or three units. The designations of the buildings, along Flushing Avenue from west (Navy Street) to east, were:

1. A timber shed
2. Quarters K, Quarters L
3. Quarters H, Quarters C
4. Quarters B
5. Quarters D
6. Quarters E, Quarters F, Quarters G
7. Quarters I

Also on the grounds were:

- A tennis court on the northeast end
- A parade ground on the northwest end
- A greenhouse
- Garages for each resident
- Quarters J, the groundskeeper's house, located near the northwestern boundary of the Row

Quarters A, the Commandant's residence, was not located on the Row. Of the structures on the Row, Quarters B is the most intricately styled and is in the best condition of any of the residences. Quarters B was the home of Admiral Matthew C. Perry while he was the commandant (titled Commodore) of the New York Navy Yard.

== History ==
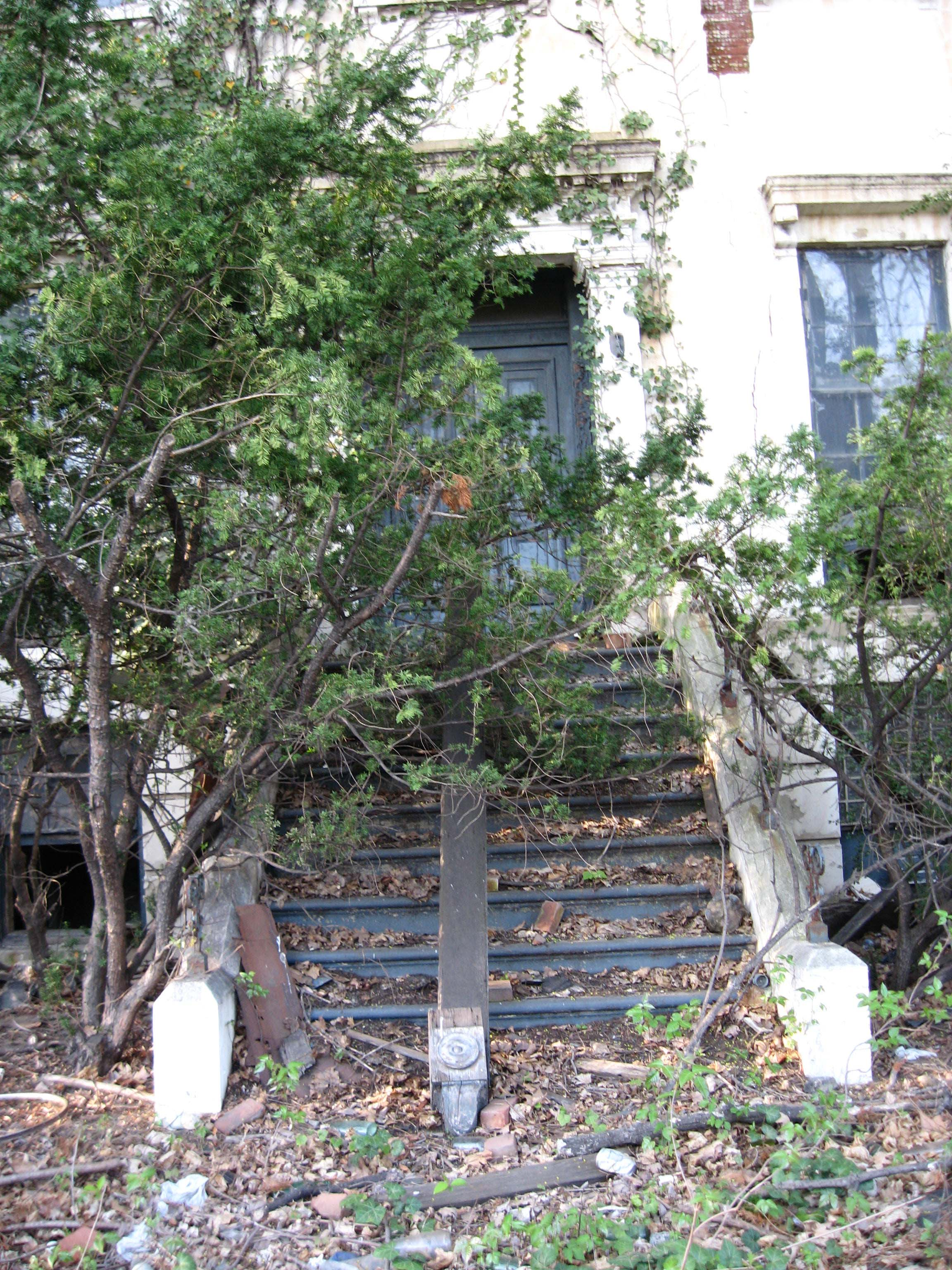
Front stoop (2010)

Admiral's Row was built on the site of a mill pond that existed early in the history of Brooklyn Navy Yard. The majority of the residences, comprising Quarters B through G, were built before 1873. The first houses, the French Empire-style Quarters E, F, and G, began construction in 1864 on the site of the Remsens' mill pond. Quarters E served as the naval constructor's residence, while Quarters F was the chief engineer's residence, and Quarters G was the surgeon's residence. Each structure had six to seven bedrooms and three bathrooms. To the west was Quarters B, the captain's residence, which was likely constructed in 1872 and was the largest house in Admiral's Row. The following house was Quarters D, the ordnance officer's residence, was probably built the following year. To the west of Quarters D was Quarters C, the equipment officer's residence, a French Second Empire building built in 1872.

Quarters H, the general storekeeper's residence, was built as an annex to Quarters C in 1881. Quarters I, a freestanding building to the east of Quarters E/F/G, was built around 1889. Quarters K and L, two attached houses, were built in 1901 to the west of Quarters C. All of these structures were designed in the French Empire style. The row was abandoned in 1966 when the Navy Yard was decommissioned.

== Redevelopment ==
The property was set to undergo a Section 106 review (under the National Historic Preservation Act of 1966) by the National Guard. In April 2008, it launched a website in order to invite public involvement in the proceedings. An open meeting was held in July 2008, where the public was asked to weigh in on the preservation of the structures. The results of that meeting were published on the National Guard website, as well as considered in the Alternatives Report for the site.

After a long period of deterioration, Admiral's Row was approved for demolition in 2009. In 2010, the administration of former New York City Mayor Michael Bloomberg proposed to revitalize the row. Two developers attempted to revitalize the row, but one was accused of bribery and another could not pay insurance after 2012's Hurricane Sandy.

Although Brooklyn Navy Yard Development Corporation president Andrew Kimball has claimed that the residences have been damaged beyond repair by the elements, the report prepared by the United States Army Corps of Engineers refuted this claim, suggesting that the residences are not only excellent candidates for rehabilitation, but meet all eligibility requirements for inclusion on the National Register of Historic Places, both individually and as a district. The New York State Department of Parks, Recreation and Historic Preservation agreed with this assessment and suggested that alternatives to demolition, including adaptive reuse, must be considered.

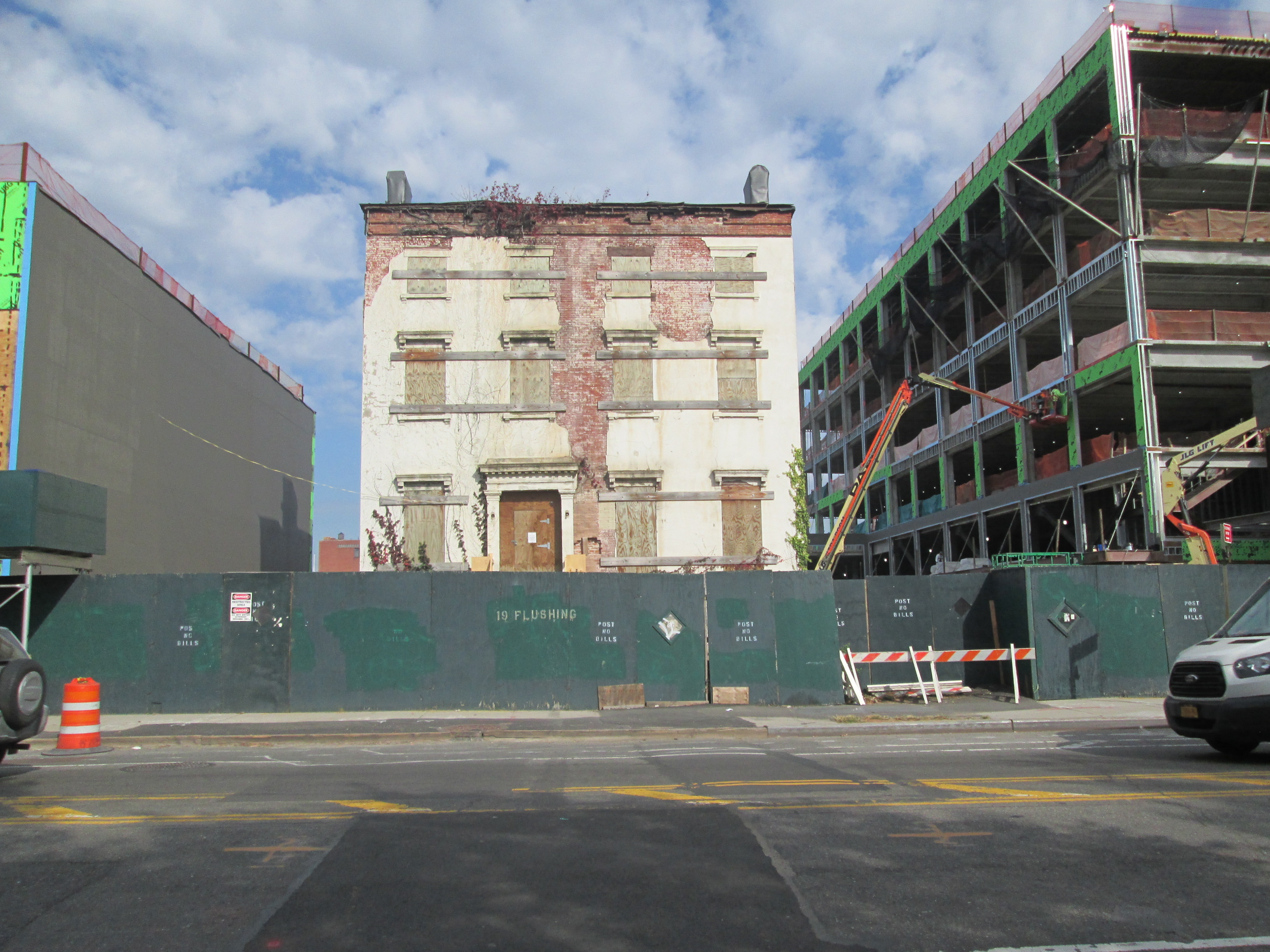
Quarters B, the sole remaining structure on Admiral's Row (2018)

The Brooklyn Navy Yard Development Corporation wanted to save the row's timber shed and Quarters B, renovating the two buildings at a cost of $70 million and demolishing the remaining buildings in Admiral's Row. The Army National Guard, which owned Admiral's Row, initially did not want to renovate the two buildings, because the entire complex was about to collapse. In November 2011, the New York City Council approved a plan to rehabilitate the more stable buildings for retail space, and demolish the unstable ones. Only Quarters B and the Timber Shed would be saved. In January 2012, the property was demilitarized and transferred to the Brooklyn Navy Yard Development Corporation.

The redevelopment of Admiral's Row was approved in 2015. Most of the buildings would be demolished; a 74,000-square-foot (6,900 m^{2}) Wegmans supermarket, the city's first, is being built on the site. The site would also be occupied by manufacturing complex at 399 Sands Street, to be developed by Steiner NYC, which already operated Steiner Studios at Brooklyn Navy Yard. To make way for these buildings, Admiral's Row was demolished in 2016. Preservationists and community members criticized the demolition of the houses. Construction on 399 Sands started in June 2018 and was completed in 2020. The adjacent Wegmans supermarket opened in 2019, as well as part of 399 Sands' parking lot. The Admiral's Row redevelopment would include 360,000 square feet (33,000 m^{2}) of light industrial and office space and 165,000 square feet (15,300 m^{2}) of retail space. In 2024, Steiner NYC refinanced the Admiral's Row development with a $148.5 million loan.

== See also ==
- List of American houses
