= Robert Wegman =

Retail executive (1918–2006)

Robert Bernard Wegman (October 14, 1918 – April 20, 2006) was an American retail executive, associated with the one-stop shopping concept. He was the son of Wegmans Food Markets co-founder Walter Wegman. From 1969 until his death in 2006 at age 87, he was the chairman of Wegmans. In over half a century under his leadership, the family grocery business grew into one of the largest private companies in the United States.

In 2005, when the company ranked #1 on Fortune magazine's list of best companies to work for, Robert Wegman is known to have said:

"This is the culmination of my life's work."

He and his wife, Peggy, grew up attending Rochester Catholic schools. He was a major benefactor of the local high school he attended, Aquinas Institute, as well as other Catholic education at Niagara University. At the collegiate level, significant gifts from Robert Wegman to St. John Fisher College helped create the Wegmans School of Pharmacy and the Wegmans School of Nursing.

Mr. Wegman was inducted into the Junior Achievement U.S. Business Hall of Fame in 2004.
