= Donald Mark =

American judge (1926–2018)

Donald J. Mark (March 31, 1926 – February 10, 2018) was an American judge.

Mark was born in Rochester, New York. He went to St. Andrew School and the Aquinas Institute in Rochester. Mark served in the United States Marine Corps during World War II and the Korean War. He also served as a colonel in the New York National Guard. Mark went to Syracuse University, Cornell Law School, and was admitted to the New York bar in 1953. From 1964 to 1973, he served as the Penfield Town Court justice. Mark then served as the Monroe County judge from 1974 to 1983. Mark served on the New York Supreme Court from 1983 to 1997.
