= Harry O =

American detective television series (1974–1976)

- Title screen
- Also known as: Harry-O
- Genre: Detective fiction
- Created by: Howard Rodman
- Written by: Robert C. Dennis; Robert Dozier; Larry Forrester; Herman Groves; Stephen Kandel; Joanna Klasson; John Meredyth Lucas; Howard Rodman; Michael Sloan; Norman Strum; Gene Thompson
- Directed by: Richard Benedict; Daryl Duke; Harry Falk; Richard Lang; Jerry London; Joseph Manduke; Russ Mayberry; John Newland; Jerry Thorpe; Paul Wendkos; Don Weis
- Starring: David Janssen; Henry Darrow; Anthony Zerbe; Paul Tulley; Farrah Fawcett-Majors; Les Lannom; Tom Atkins; Bill Henderson
- Theme music composer: Billy Goldenberg
- Composers: Billy Goldenberg; Kim Richmond; J. J. Johnson; John Rubinstein
- Country of origin: United States
- Original language: English
- No. of seasons: 2
- No. of episodes: 44

Production
- Executive producer: Jerry Thorpe
- Producers: Alex Beaton; Robert Dozier; Buck Houghton; Robert E. Thompson
- Running time: 60 mins. (approx)
- Production company: Warner Bros. Television

Original release
- Network: ABC
- Release: September 12, 1974 – April 29, 1976

Related
- Such Dust as Dreams Are Made On (1973) Smile Jenny, You're Dead (1974)

Harry O, sometimes spelled Harry-O, is an American private detective series that aired for two seasons on ABC from 1974 to 1976. The series starred David Janssen, and Jerry Thorpe was executive producer. Harry O followed the broadcast of two pilot films: first Such Dust as Dreams Are Made On (which aired on March 11, 1973) and second (with noticeable retooling) Smile Jenny, You're Dead (which aired on February 3, 1974), both starring Janssen.

== Synopsis ==
David Janssen starred as the title character Harry Orwell, a San Diego cop forced into retirement when he is shot in the back. To support himself, he sets up a private investigation practice out of his beach house on Coronado Island, in San Diego. Henry Darrow (formerly of the 1967–71 NBC hit Western series The High Chaparral) originally starred as Lt. Manny Quinlan, Harry's friend and police contact.

For the second half of the first season, the series was retooled, with the location of the series shifted to Los Angeles, California, due to the high production costs of filming in and around San Diego. The retooling consisted of more than just a location change; a revised theme song and incidental music were composed and new supporting characters were added, notably the irascible Lt. Trench of the Santa Monica Police Department, who became Orwell's new foil/contact. (Henry Darrow's character, Lt. Quinlan, was killed off in a crossover episode.) Most noticeably, a lighter tone for the scripts and acting was adopted. Harry still lived in a beach cottage−this time at Paradise Cove, just south but in sight of the trailer used in The Rockford Files.

The second season had a further reworking of the opening credits and theme song, and recurring characters were added. Anthony Zerbe, who played Lt. Trench, won a Primetime Emmy Award for his role on the series. Recurring characters included Farrah Fawcett-Majors, as Harry's next-door neighbor and sometime girlfriend Sue Ingram/Ingham; Paul Tulley as Sgt. Roberts, Lt. Trench's assistant; Les Lannom as Lester Hodges, a bumbling private-eye wannabe; Tom Atkins as Sgt. Frank Cole; and Bill Henderson as Spencer Johnson, Harry's frustrated car mechanic.

Harry's small Austin-Healey, which spent almost all of the first season in non-running condition, later had more time on the road as the series progressed, though it was never entirely reliable. Also, in the San Diego episodes, the bullet in Harry's back noticeably impeded his ability to get around; by the second season, though the bullet's existence was mentioned in passing, Harry was miraculously able to run, jump, and engage in strenuous physical activity with seemingly no issues.

== Reception and cancellation ==
Ratings for the series were initially fair, and they received a boost after the series was retooled in January 1975. Harry O was picked up for a second season and continued to gain viewership and critical acclaim. Then-ABC president Fred Silverman, though, decided to take the network in a different direction and cancelled the series in favor of Charlie's Angels. Farrah Fawcett-Majors, supporting player to Janssen's Harry O, was selected as one of the three stars of that new series.

The last original episode aired on April 29, 1976. The series' cancellation greatly disenchanted its star Janssen, who had found and shaped probably his most ideal character ever in Harry Orwell; he thus vowed never again to participate in another television series, though he later appeared in the miniseries The Word (1978) and Centennial (1978–79).

== Syndication ==
The show was rerun late at night on CBS during 1979–1980 as part of The CBS Late Movie. It was run in syndication in the late 1980s on a few stations around the U.S. and had a short-lived run on GoodLife TV Network in the early 2000s. The first pilot movie still receives occasional airings.

The series was occasionally presented in weekend binges on the OTA television network Decades (now Catchy Comedy) and previously aired weekdays on MeTV+. The series began airing on MeTV in January 2025, following Janssen's previous series The Fugitive late night Sundays.

== Episodes ==
=== Pilot movies ===
Both pilot movies are set and were shot in Los Angeles.
With the exception of Harry Orwell, none of the recurring characters who would feature in the series appear in the pilot movies. The pilot movies also contain some details of Harry's backstory that clash with the character as established in the series.
Two of the actors who would feature in the series play different roles in Such Dust as Dreams are Made On; Les Lannom (who played Lester Hodges in the series) plays a student, while Mel Stewart (seen as Harry's mechanic Roy in the series) plays Harry's police contact, Sgt. Granger.
In the second pilot movie, Smile Jenny, You're Dead, Barbara Leigh (who appeared as Gina in the series) plays a character called Mildred. A character called Mildred also appeared in the first pilot movie, played by Marianna Hill.

| No. overall | No. in season | Title | Directed by | Written by | Original release date |
|---|---|---|---|---|---|
| Pilot | 1 | "Such Dust as Dreams are Made On" | Jerry Thorpe | Howard Rodman | March 11, 1973 |
Harlan Garrison (Martin Sheen), a member of the gang that shot Harry in a drugstore robbery four years earlier, hires Harry to find Garrison's two accomplices. It stars Sal Mineo, Will Geer, Margot Kidder and Mel Stewart. Portions of this movie were re-edited and reused (in a very different context) in the first-season episode "Elegy For A Cop"; the two stories are not compatible within the same series continuity.
| Pilot | 2 | "Smile Jenny, You're Dead" | Jerry Thorpe | Howard Rodman | February 3, 1974 |
Harry is hired to protect Jennifer English (Andrea Marcovicci), a model being tailed by a deranged stalker who also appears to have murdered her estranged husband. It stars Jodie Foster as Liberty Cole (a homeless girl who takes up residence in Harry's boat), Clu Gulager, and Zalman King.

=== Season 1: The San Diego episodes ===
Episodes 1–13 are set and were shot in San Diego.

The supporting cast for the San Diego episodes includes:

- Henry Darrow as Lt. Manny Quinlan, Harry's sometimes antagonistic police contact
- Tom Atkins as Sgt. Frank Cole, Quinlan's none-too-bright assistant (five episodes)
- David Moses as Officer Billings, a patrolman often seen performing crime-scene duties (four episodes)
- G. W. Bailey as Officer Remsen, a patrolman also often seen at crime scenes (three episodes)
- Mel Stewart as Roy Bardello, Harry's sarcastic mechanic (seen in two episodes, referenced in others)

| No. overall | No. in season | Title | Directed by | Written by | Original release date |
|---|---|---|---|---|---|
| 1 | 1 | "Gertrude" | Jerry Thorpe | Howard Rodman | September 12, 1974 |
The sister of a sailor absent without leave, Gertrude (Julie Sommars) hires Harry to find him, and the only clue is that his left shoe was mailed to her. However, another clue then arrives in the form of two fake shore patrol officers. Les Lannom, later a series regular in the role of Lester Hodges, plays the AWOL sailor. Henry Darrow debuts as Lt. Quinlan.
| 2 | 2 | "The Admiral's Lady" | Paul Wendkos | Del Reisman | September 19, 1974 |
Harry is hired to find an admiral's wife, who is presumed dead by the police, but who turns out to be alive and in genuine danger. With Leif Erickson and Sharon Acker
| 3 | 3 | "Guardian at the Gates" | Jerry Thorpe | Stephen Kandel | September 26, 1974 |
Harry must protect an obnoxious, self-centered architect (Barry Sullivan), who witnessed a murder and is oblivious to attempts on his own life. This was the first episode filmed for the regular series. With Linda Evans, Anne Archer, Richard Kelton and Gordon Jump
| 4 | 4 | "Mortal Sin" | Paul Wendkos | T : Stephen Kandel; S/T : Robert Malcolm Young | October 3, 1974 |
A man confesses to murder to a priest, and Harry is brought in to help stop the man from killing again. With Laurence Luckinbill
| 5 | 5 | "Coinage of the Realm" | Richard Lang | Elroy Schwartz | October 10, 1974 |
Harry must find a man who is needed to donate a kidney to his daughter (played by Dawn Lyn), and who also has two hired killers on his trail. With Kenneth Mars, Joan Darling, and Florence Stanley
| 6 | 6 | "Eyewitness" | Richard Lang | Herman Groves | October 17, 1974 |
A blind teenager is the only witness to a murder. It stars James McEachin and Rosalind Cash. Margaret Avery, later a series regular in a different role, plays the teenager's elder sister. Both Hal Williams and Bill Henderson, who later play Harry's mechanics in the Los Angeles episodes, also appear in this episode as different characters.
| 7 | 7 | "Shadows At Noon" | Paul Wendkos | Robert Dozier | October 24, 1974 |
Harry infiltrates a mental hospital that holds people as prisoners, and then finds that he cannot get out, either. With Diana Ewing and Guy Stockwell, it aired one year before the movie One Flew Over the Cuckoo's Nest, but 12 years after the eponymous novel that inspired the movie.
| 8 | 8 | "Ballinger's Choice" | Jerry Thorpe | Gene Thompson | October 31, 1974 |
Harry is hired to track down a wealthy missing pal with a penchant for extramarital affairs, but the investigation soon reveals a number of sordid -- and deadly -- details. With Juliet Mills, Paul Burke, and Lisa Gerritsen
| 9 | 9 | "Second Sight" | John Newland | T : Gene Thompson; S/T : Barry Trivers | November 7, 1974 |
Fay Conners (Stefanie Powers), an apparent psychic, predicts a series of murders that all come true amid Harry's search for a missing psychiatrist. Also starring Robert Doyle.
| 10 | 10 | "Material Witness" | Barry Crane | Richard Danus | November 14, 1974 |
Dr. Noelle Kira witnesses the killing of a witness to crimes by one Joe Kiley. SDPD Captain Pete Jaklin, because of the killing of other witnesses, hires Harry to protect Kira. She dislikes Harry, but when they are followed to a beach house, Harry realizes a mole is in the department, so Jaklin and he have to find the mole. With Barbara Anderson, James Olson, and Mike Farrell
| 11 | 11 | "Forty Reasons to Kill (Part 1)" | Daryl Duke | Stephen Kandel | December 5, 1974 |
A friend of Harry's is framed for drug dealing when he tries to purchase a parcel of land. With Joanna Pettet, Broderick Crawford, Craig Stevens, and Paul Benedict
| 12 | 12 | "Forty Reasons to Kill (Part 2)" | Daryl Duke | Stephen Kandel | December 12, 1974 |
Harry finds himself framed for murder as his investigation of a 40-acre purchase continues. With Joanna Pettet, Craig Stevens and Bill Quinn
| 13 | 13 | "Accounts Balanced" | Robert Michael Lewis | T : Herman Groves; S/T : Michael Winder | December 26, 1974 |
Harry is hired by a woman who believes her husband is having an affair. With Linda Marsh, Robert Reed, Gerrit Graham, and Jerry Hardin, this was the last episode shot in San Diego, and the final episode for Lt. Quinlan as a regular.

=== Season 1: The Los Angeles episodes ===
Beginning with episode 14, a change in format was made. Behind the scenes, new production staff members were brought in, and on-camera, the entire supporting cast was dropped. Filming moved from San Diego to Los Angeles.
Episode 14 was a stand-alone story that sent Harry out to perform his investigations in a remote desert location.
From episode 15, Harry relocated to Los Angeles -- within the series continuity, initially only with the intention of staying temporarily. As of episode 17, Harry moves his permanent residence to the same location seen in the second pilot movie.

The supporting cast for the Los Angeles episodes (from episode 15) includes:

- Anthony Zerbe as Lt. K.C. Trench, Harry's new police contact
- Paul Tulley as Sgt. Roberts, Trench's quiet assistant
- Hal Williams as Clarence, Harry's new mechanic (three episodes)
- Kathrine Baumann as Betsy, one of a group of friendly stewardesses who live next door to Harry (three episodes)
- Farrah Fawcett-Majors as Sue Ingram, another stewardess-next-door seen after Betsy leaves to marry her boyfriend (three episodes)

- Sue's huge dog Grover appears in two episodes, as Harry is often forced to look after him while Sue is away.
- Betsy's massive boyfriend Walter is often mentioned, but never seen

Seen in one episode each were two characters who would become recurring players in season two: Les Lannom as amateur criminologist Lester Hodges, and Margaret Avery as friendly informant Ruby Dome. Henry Darrow also returned for one episode ("Elegy for a Cop") as Manny Quinlan.

| No. overall | No. in season | Title | Directed by | Written by | Original release date |
|---|---|---|---|---|---|
| 14 | 14 | "The Last Heir" | Richard Lang | Gene Thompson | January 9, 1975 |
Harry is hired to smoke out a killer of a woman's heirs. With Jeanette Nolan, Clifford David, and Whit Bissell
| 15 | 15 | "For the Love of Money" | John Newland | S : Skip Webster; T : David P. Harmon | January 16, 1975 |
A woman helps her boyfriend steal $25,000 and now the boyfriend has disappeared. This is the first episode with Anthony Zerbe as Lt. Trench and Paul Tulley as Sgt. Roberts, and the first episode actually set in Los Angeles. The opening theme song is also completely reworked for this and all future season-one episodes. With Mariclare Costello, Bernie Kopell, Sabrina Scharf, and Sharon Farrell
| 16 | 16 | "The Confetti People" | Richard Lang | T : Herman Groves; S/T : Mann Rubin | January 23, 1975 |
An arthritic painter and his wife frame his brother, a mental patient, for murder, until the plan goes awry and the painter is shot dead by the brother. With Diana Hyland, Scott Hylands, John Rubinstein, and Marsha Hunt
| 17 | 17 | "Sound of Trumpets" | John Newland | T : Larry Forrester; S/T : Robert Pirosh | January 30, 1975 |
A recently released jazz trumpeter is pursued by a vengeful record executive who has a left-handed knife killer take the trumpeter's daughter hostage. With Julius Harris, Brenda Sykes, Jim Backus, and jazz legend Cab Calloway
| 18 | 18 | "Silent Kill" | Richard Lang | S : John Meredyth Lucas; T : Steven Kandel | February 6, 1975 |
A deaf-mute janitor is framed for arson. With Kathleen Lloyd, Gail Strickland, Lawrence Pressman, and Jack Riley
| 19 | 19 | "Double Jeopardy" | John Newland | M. Gluck | February 13, 1975 |
A former crime boss mistakenly believes Todd Conway, an aspiring actor, killed the man's daughter, and Harry smokes out the real killer when the girl was found to be pregnant. With Kurt Russell, Will Kuluva and Ben Piazza, Linda Dano appears very briefly as the murder victim. This is also the first episode with Farrah Fawcett-Majors, who plays the semiregular role of Orwell's neighbor, Sue.
| 20 | 20 | "Lester" | Richard Lang | Robert C. Dennis | February 20, 1975 |
A college student who wants to be a detective becomes a suspect in the murder of two female students. With Richard Schaal and Scott Newman, Les Lannom's character of Lester Hodges, who became a recurring character in the series' second season, makes his debut.
| 21 | 21 | "Elegy for a Cop" | Jerry Thorpe | Howard Rodman | February 27, 1975 |
Harry pursues the killer of his former police friend, Manny Quinlan. About 15 minutes of this episode (all contained in the show's second half) consists of reused and repurposed footage from the pilot film Such Dust as Dreams are Made On. Kathleen Lloyd and Sal Mineo appear in both newly shot and recycled footage; Henry Darrow receives "Special Guest Star" billing for his reprisal of the role of Lt. Quinlan (all in newly-shot footage). Also in newly-shot footage, Margaret Avery debuts as Ruby Dome, who will become a recurring character in season 2.
| 22 | 22 | "Street Games" | Richard Lang | Herman Groves | March 2, 1975 |
The mother of a teenaged girl who is an addict hires Harry to find her after her boyfriend is murdered by a narcotics dealer. With Maureen McCormick and Philip Sterling

=== Season 2 ===
Season two remained in Los Angeles. Some changes were made to the supporting cast, and the theme was given a second radical rearrangement.

The season-two supporting cast includes:

- Anthony Zerbe as Lt. K.C. Trench, Harry's police contact
- Paul Tulley as Sgt. Roberts, Trench's assistant
- Farrah Fawcett-Majors as Sue Ingham, Harry's neighbor (five episodes)
- Bill Henderson as Spencer Johnson, Harry's frustrated mechanic (four episodes)
- Richard Stahl as Dr. Carl Samuelson, a police pathologist (four episodes)
- Les Lannom as Lester Hodges, an amateur criminologist who gets mixed up in Harry's cases (three episodes)
- Margaret Avery as Ruby Dome (or Ruby Lawrence'), an informant with whom Harry is friendly (three episodes)
- Susan Adams as Jean Parnell, a police laboratory technician (three episodes)
- Barbara Leigh as Gina Walters, Harry's contact at the DMV (seen in two episodes, referenced in others)

| No. overall | No. in season | Title | Directed by | Written by | Original release date |
|---|---|---|---|---|---|
| 23 | 1 | "Anatomy of a Frame" | Jerry Thorpe | S : Herman Groves; T : John Meredyth Lucas | September 11, 1975 |
An informant for Lt. Trench is murdered; Trench himself is implicated and must hire Harry Orwell to clear his name. With René Auberjonois, James McEachin, Gordon Jump, James Hong, Harold J. Stone, and an unbilled Gary Sandy
| 24 | 2 | "One for the Road" | Harry Falk | Norman Strum | September 18, 1975 |
An alcoholic lawyer subject to memory blackouts hires Harry to investigate a hit-and-run incident, though she is aware that she may well have been the driver behind the wheel. With Carol Rossen, Larry Hagman, and Robert Loggia
| 25 | 3 | "Lester Two" | Richard Lang | Robert C. Dennis | September 25, 1975 |
Lester Hodges gets mixed up with Harry when diamond smugglers kidnap Harry's neighbor Sue Ingham. With Ina Balin and—extremely briefly—Loni Anderson
| 26 | 4 | "Shades" | Richard Lang | S : Eugene Crisci, Ron Jacoby; T : Michael Sloan | October 2, 1975 |
A housekeeper is accused of killing a small-time hood; Harry is hired to clear her name and must work with the hood's ex-partner to find the real killer. With Lou Gossett, Jr., Linden Chiles and Anjanette Comer. G.W. Bailey, seen occasionally as Officer Remsen during the San Diego episodes, also plays a police officer in this episode, identified in the credits as "Garner".
| 27 | 5 | "Portrait of a Murder" | Richard Lang | Robert C. Dennis | October 9, 1975 |
Harry attempts to clear a developmentally disabled young man accused of a series of murders he says were committed by "a lion"—a clue to the murderer's actual identity. With Adam Arkin and Katherine Helmond
| 28 | 6 | "The Acolyte" | Harry Falk | T : Larry Forrester; S/T : Robert Blees, Dorothy Robinson | October 16, 1975 |
Harry must rescue a woman taken in by a religious cult. With Bettye Ackerman, Severn Darden, Barry Atwater, Clyde Kusatsu, and Sam Jaffe
| 29 | 7 | "Mayday" | Jerry London | John Meredyth Lucas | October 23, 1975 |
A pilot friend of Harry's dies in a plane crash, and Harry discovers he was involved in an attempted murder. With Bruce Kirby, Maggie Blye, Linda Kelsey, and Geoffrey Lewis
| 30 | 8 | "Tender Killing Care" | Richard Lang | Norman Strum | October 30, 1975 |
Harry investigates the shady nursing home where Spencer's parents live, while Sue has Harry look for the missing father of three children who have just arrived from Hong Kong. With Kenneth Mars, Howard Hesseman, Jester Hairston, and Robert Ito
| 31 | 9 | "APB Harry Orwell" | Richard Lang | S : Alfred Brenner; T : William R. Stratton | November 6, 1975 |
Harry is framed for murder, and must escape his cell to find the real guilty party. With Lesley Ann Warren, and Michael C. Gwynne
| 32 | 10 | "Group Terror" | Russ Mayberry | Dennis Landa | November 13, 1975 |
A psychiatrist hires Harry to pose as a patient, to help smoke out a killer among the members of her therapy group. With Joanna Pettet and Linda Lavin
| 33 | 11 | "Reflections" | Richard Lang | Michael Sloan | November 20, 1975 |
Harry is forced to relive his bitter divorce when his ex-wife is involved in a murder. With Felicia Farr, Andrew Robinson, and Peter Donat
| 34 | 12 | "Exercise In Fatality" | Russ Mayberry | Kenneth Realman | December 4, 1975 |
A hotheaded policeman is accused of murder when the boyfriend who fathered his daughter's unborn child is found dead; making it worse for Harry, a former lover returns to his life and gets swept into the case. With Ralph Meeker
| 35 | 13 | "The Madonna Legacy" | Richard Bennett | Michael Sloan | December 11, 1975 |
One of Harry's former police colleagues is killed while reinvestigating an old murder, and Harry learns that a violent man convicted of the murder was recently released. With John Colicos, Christine Belford, and Jack Riley
| 36 | 14 | "Mister Five and Dime" | Richard Lang | Robert C. Dennis | January 8, 1976 |
Harry, Lester, and Lt. Trench run into repeated cases of mistaken identity as they pursue a gang of armored-car thieves. Harry mentions Lester's mentor Dr. Creighton Fong for the first time in the series. With Glynnis O'Connor, Michael McGuire, J. Pat O'Malley, and Michael Pataki
| 37 | 15 | "Book of Changes" | Russ Mayberry | T : Michael Sloan; S/T : Michael Adams | January 15, 1976 |
A witness to the murder of a gambling club owner hires Harry to find the club owner's book of clients, which has been stolen by extortionists. With Barbara Rhoades and Barbara Cason
| 38 | 16 | "Past Imperfect" | Richard Lang | Stephen Kandel | January 22, 1976 |
A con artist takes his ex-partner and Harry hostage to get back a suitcase he claims contains several thousand dollars, and they are themselves pursued by two mob hitmen. With Susan Strasberg, Tim McIntire, Granville Van Dusen, and David Opatoshu
| 39 | 17 | "Hostage" | Jerry London | Michael Sloan | February 19, 1976 |
Lt. Trench is called to a hostage situation at a local liquor store, and soon calls on Harry to act as the nonpolice intermediary the hostage-taker has demanded. With John Rubinstein, George Murdock, Quinn Redeker, Colleen Camp, and Tim Thomerson. Guest star Rubinstein also composed the score for this episode.
| 40 | 18 | "Forbidden City" | Richard Lang | Robert C. Dennis | February 26, 1976 |
Harry investigates the killing of a private detective in Chinatown. With Tina Chen, Ramon Bieri, Benson Fong, James Hong, and Jerry Hardin
| 41 | 19 | "Victim" | Richard Lang | T : Michael Sloan; S/T : John Meredyth Lucas | March 4, 1976 |
A rape victim hires Harry. With Eugene Roche, Michael Lerner, and Cynthia Avila, this was the last episode of the series to be filmed.
| 42 | 20 | "Ruby" | Richard Lang | S : Susan Glasgow; S/T : Michael Sloan | March 11, 1976 |
Harry must help one of his informants after a youth gets mixed up in a car theft that results in the death of a policeman. With Joe Ruskin
| 43 | 21 | "The Mysterious Case of Lester and Dr. Fong" | Jerry Thorpe | Robert Dozier | March 18, 1976 |
Lester Hodges and his mentor, Dr. Creighton Fong (Keye Luke), work together to find the murderer of members of Lester's family. Harry is seen only in a supporting role, and is absent for long stretches of screen time, as this episode was a backdoor pilot intended to launch a spin-off series titled Fong and Hodges. With Anne Archer, Barry Atwater, Sorrell Booke, Dean Jagger, and Roddy McDowall
| 44 | 22 | "Death Certificate" | Russ Mayberry | John Meredyth Lucas | April 29, 1976 |
Harry investigates a doctor suspected by two women of fatal malpractice. With Ruth Roman and Kiel Martin

== Awards and nominations ==
| Year | Award | Category | Nominee(s) | Result | Ref. |
|---|---|---|---|---|---|
| 1975 | Edgar Allan Poe Awards | Best Episode in a TV Series | Howard Rodman (for "Gertrude") | Nominated | |
| 1976 | Primetime Emmy Awards | Outstanding Continuing Performance by a Supporting Actor in a Drama Series | Anthony Zerbe | Won | |

== Home media ==
On July 11, 2012, Warner Bros. released Harry O: The Complete First Season on DVD in region 1 via their Warner Archive Collection. This is a manufacture-on-demand (MOD) release, available exclusively through Warner's online store and only in the US. The 6-disc set features all 22 episodes of the season as well as the original pilot tele-film Such Dust as Dreams Are Made On. The second and final season was released by Warner Archive on February 5, 2013.
