= Diplomatic Immunity (1991 American film) =

1991 film directed by Peter Maris

- Directed by: Peter Maris
- Screenplay by: Randall Frakes; Jim Trombetta; Richard Donn
- Based on: The Stalker by Theodore Taylor
- Produced by: Peter Maris; William J. Males; Harry Shuster; Sonny Vest
- Starring: Bruce Boxleitner; Billy Drago; Fabiana Udenio; Tom Bresnahan; Meg Foster; Robert Forster; Robert DoQui; Ken Foree; Paul Napier
- Cinematography: Gerald B. Wolfe
- Edited by: Michael J. Sheridan; Jack Tucker
- Music by: John Massari
- Release date: 1991
- Country: United States
- Language: English

Diplomatic Immunity is a 1991 American action thriller film directed by Peter Maris, it is based on the novel The Stalker by Theodore Taylor.

== Plot ==
U.S. Marine Cole Hickel (Boxleitner) vows revenge on the evil psychopath Klaus Hermann (Bresnahan), who has killed his daughter. Hermann has an obsession with murdering people and photographing their dead bodies. He also has diplomatic immunity as his mother, Gerta (Foster), is the President of Paraguay, and therefore he cannot be prosecuted by conventional means. Hickel travels to Paraguay and teams up with a smuggler named Cowboy (Drago) to take his own revenge. In the end, Hickel and Cowboy track Hermann to the presidential palace. Gerta fatally shoots Cowboy and gives the pistol to her son to kill Hickel. Cowboy, with his last breath, kills Gerta with a spear gun. Hermann flees and Hickel gives chase, killing many of Hermann's henchmen in the process. After CIA agents show up and stop Hickel, Hermann goes back to his mother's dead body to photograph her, only to be blown up by C-4 explosives hidden inside his camera by Hickel. At the airport, Paraguay officials try to arrest Hickel, but in a twist of irony, the CIA agent claims diplomatic immunity for Hickel.

== Cast ==
- Bruce Boxleitner as Cole Hickel
- Billy Drago as "Cowboy"
- Tom Bresnahan as Klaus Hermann
- Christopher Neame as Stefan Noll
- Meg Foster as Gerta Hermann
- Robert Forster as Stonebridge
- Robert DoQui as Ferguson
- Ken Foree as Del Roy Gaines
- Paul Napier as Kinnick
- Sharon Case as Ellen Hickel
- Fabiana Udenio as Teresa Escobal
- Matthias Hues as Gephardt
- Kenneth Kimmins as Wyler
- Lee de Broux as McManus
- Victor Mohica as Customs Officer

== Production ==
=== Development ===
Diplomatic Immunity is based on the 1987 novel The Stalker by Theodore Taylor (who was mainly known as a children's author). One of the changes in the movie is the location of the action, which takes place in Europe in the book, but is moved to Paraguay for the movie.

It was produced, and released by the Fries Distribution Company, as well as Filmkompaniet Distribution in Norway; Highlight Video in Germany; Home Cinema Group in Australia; and Scanbox Norge in Norway.
