= Ministry of Vengeance =

- Directed by: Peter Maris
- Written by: Mervyn Emeryys; Brian D. Jeffries; Ann Narus
- Story by: Randal Patrick
- Produced by: Brad Krevoy; Steven Stabler
- Starring: John Schneider; Ned Beatty; George Kennedy; James Tolkan; Apollonia; Yaphet Kotto
- Cinematography: Mark Morris
- Edited by: Michael Haight
- Music by: Scott Roewe
- Production company: Motion Picture Corporation of America
- Distributed by: Concorde Pictures
- Release date: November 3, 1989 (Los Angeles)
- Running time: 96 minutes
- Country: United States
- Languages: English; Italian

Ministry of Vengeance is a 1989 American action thriller film directed by Peter Maris and starring John Schneider, Ned Beatty, George Kennedy, Apollonia Kotero, Yaphet Kotto and James Tolkan.

== Cast ==
- John Schneider as David Miller
- Ned Beatty as Rev. Bloor
- James Tolkan as Col. Freeman
- Yaphet Kotto as Mr. Whiteside
- Apollonia Kotero as Zarah
- George Kennedy as Rev. Hughes
- Robert Miano as Ali Aboud
- Maria Richwine as Fatima
