= Terror Squad (film) =

1987 film by Peter Maris

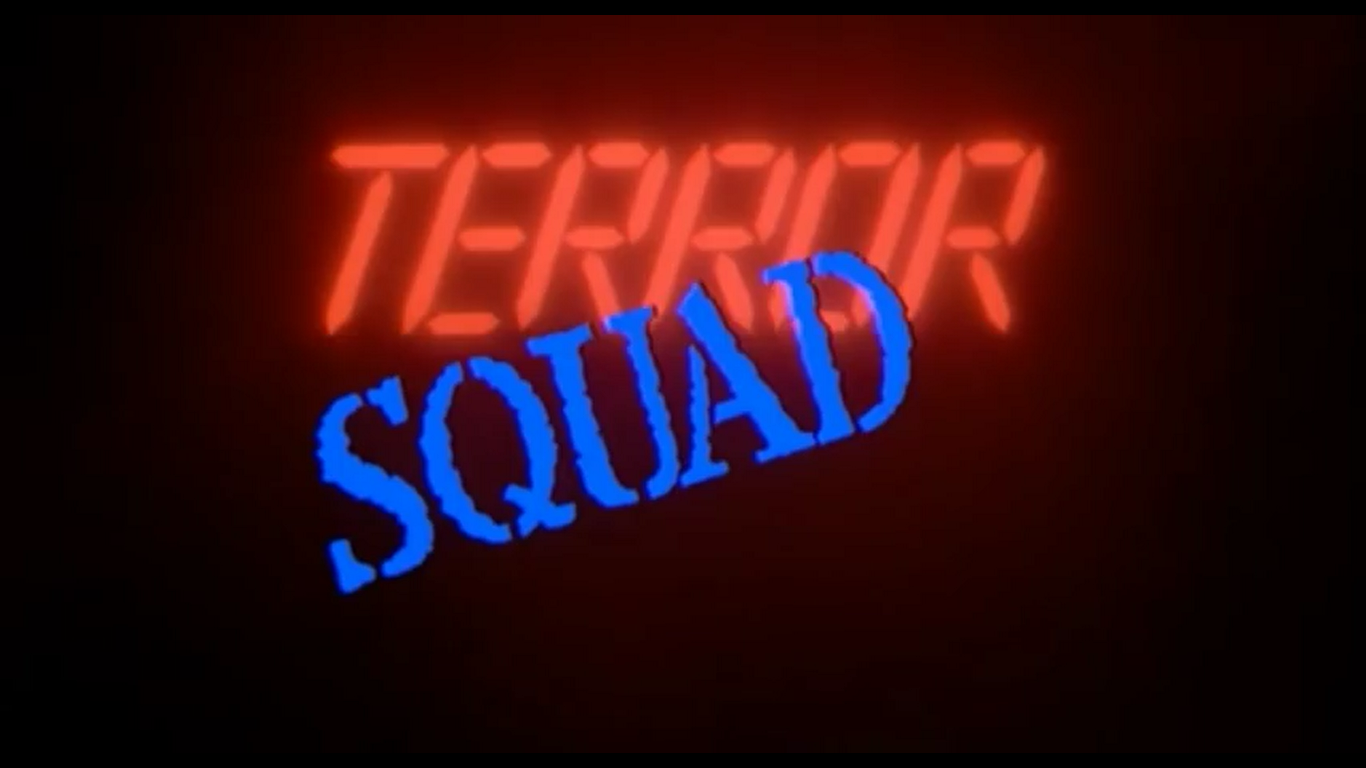
- Directed by: Peter Maris
- Screenplay by: Chuck Rose
- Story by: Mark Verheiden
- Produced by: Peter Maris
- Starring: Chuck Connors
- Cinematography: Peter Jensen; Jeff Johnson
- Edited by: Jack Tucker
- Music by: Chuck Cirino
- Production company: Matterhorn Group
- Distributed by: Manson International
- Release date: 1987
- Running time: 92 minutes
- Country: United States
- Language: English

Terror Squad is a 1987 action film directed by Peter Maris. The film stars Chuck Connors.

== Plot ==
In 1987 in Libya, a crowd is rallying at an anti-American speech. The crowd excitedly waves rifles and banners, while burning an American effigy. The movie then cuts to Kokomo, Indiana, showing a regular day at the old Kokomo High School (now Central Middle School). Several students are stuck in detention after school.

Four terrorists cross the Canada–US border, and they attempt to attack the Blackriver Nuclear Power Plant (a fictitious power plant in Howard County, Indiana) with a car bomb. After this fails, the remaining three escape, pursued by several police cruisers. Chief Rawlings (Chuck Connors), the Kokomo Police Department chief, is radioed, and he and the other officers join the chase. Two terrorists manage to survive and escape to Kokomo High School, where they hold the detention's students and teacher hostage. The Kokomo SWAT team surrounds the school, and Chief Rawlings attempts to negotiate the release of the hostages. Meanwhile, the terrorists kill several hostages that attempt to resist them. Chief Rawlings agrees to the terrorists' demand for a bus so they can get to an airport. The two terrorists drag a girl out with them, and they board the school bus. In the process, a boy running along the roof manages to jump on top of the school bus and tries to get in the bus as the terrorists lead the police on a high-speed car chase.

Eventually, the bus tips over. The lone surviving terrorist attempts to kill himself and the girl by pulling the pin on a grenade. The boy knocks him out, and he and the girl manage to escape from the bus before the grenade explodes.

== Production ==
The majority of the film was shot in Kokomo, Indiana, with a few parts shot in Michigan City, Indiana and Laurel, Indiana and the opening scene shot in Istanbul). Although most of the major characters were professional actors, many residents of Kokomo were hired to work as extras or assistants on the set. Kokomo residents will notice that the paths of the car chases do not make sense; as in most films, scenes were stitched together after filming.

== Cast ==
- Chuck Connors as Chief Rawlings
- Brodie Greer as Captain Steiner
- Bill Calvert as Johnny
- Kerry Wall as Jennifer
- Kavi Raz as Yassir
- Joseph Nasser as Gamal
- Budge Threlkeld as Mr. Nero
- Dennis Moynahan as Norman
- Ken Foree as Deputy Brown
- Nathan Dyer as Doug
- Lisa Beth Ross as Larissa
- Baggie Hardiman as Gus
- Jill Sanders as Mary Lynn
- Marco Kyris as Hassan
- Nicholas Celozzi as Moammar
- Scott St. James as News Reporter
- Jeffrey B. Mallian as Policeman #1
- Randy Roberts as Policeman #2

== Reception ==
The film received mixed reviews. Variety considers the movie interesting, despite its absurd plot. Dennis Schwartz criticized the movie for being clumsily made, with poor production and one-dimensional characters.
