= Delirium (1979 film) =

1979 American thriller film by Peter Maris

- Theatrical release poster
- Directed by: Peter Maris
- Written by: Peter Maris; Richard Yalem
- Story by: Eddie Krell; Jim Loew
- Produced by: Peter Maris; Sonny Vest
- Cinematography: Bill Mensch
- Edited by: Dan Perry
- Music by: David C. Williams
- Release date: July 1979
- Country: United States
- Language: English

Delirium (also known as Psycho Puppet) is a 1979 American thriller film directed by Peter Maris and written by Maris and Richard Yalem. The film is one of the infamous "Video Nasties".

== Plot ==
Charlie Gunther, a psychotic former soldier, is employed by a vigilante council led by a bald badass, Eric Stem, to eradicate the city's vagrants until Gunther takes it too far.

== Cast ==
- Turk Cekovsky as Paul Dollinger
- Debi Chaney as Susan Norcross
- Terry TenBroek as Larry Mead (credited as Terry Ten Broek)
- Barron Winchester as Eric Stem
- Bob Winters as Donald Andrews
- Garrett Bergfeld as Mark
- Nick Panouzis as Charlie Gunther
- Harry Gorsuch as Captain Hearn
- Chris Chronopolis as Detective Parker
- Lloyd Schattyn as Detective Simms
- Jack Garvey as Devlin
- Mike Kalist as Specter
- Myron Kozman as Wells
- Pat Knapko as Jenny Thompson
- Letty Garris as Hitchhiker
- Charlotte Littrel as Vietnamese Prostitute
- Richard L. Jones as Grocery Delivery Boy

== Release ==
Delirium was released in July 1979 in the United States.

== Critical reception ==
TV Guide's review was generally unfavorable, criticising the film's use of Vietnam War flashbacks to explain the killer's motivations.
