= Bob Winters =

American actor

- Occupations: Actor, comic, juggler
- Years active: 1949–1979

Bob Winters was a comic juggler and occasional actor who appeared on Toast of the Town from 1949 to 1953.

== Career ==
As a juggler, among some of the venues he appeared in the 1940s and 1950s were the Art Linkletter show at the New York State Fair and the Empire Room, Palmer House in Chicago. He also had some acting roles in television and film, appearing as a Juggler in a Gomer Pyle episode Sing a Song of Papa that starred Anthony Caruso, as a Juggler in Doctor Dolittle and as Donald Andrews in the 1979 thriller Delirium.

== Film and television ==
=== Roles ===
- 1967 Gomer Pyle, Episode: Sing a Song of Papa as Juggler
- 1967 Doctor Dolittle as Juggler
- 1979 Delirium as Donald Andrews

=== Himself ===
As Bobby Winters:

- 1949 Toast of the Town – Episode # 3.9
- 1950 Toast of the Town - Episode # 3.33
- 1951 Toast of the Town - Episode # 5.6
- 1953 Toast of the Town – Episode # 6.52
- 1953 The George Jessel Show – Episode # 1.4
- 1966 The Hollywood Palace – Episode # 3.29
- 2006 I'm Henpecked - Episode # 4
