= Paul Napier =

American actor

- Born: March 10, 1930; Rochester, New York, United States
- Died: February 21, 2015 (aged 84); Sherman Oaks, Los Angeles, California, United States
- Occupation: Actor
- Spouse: Marie Bonady Napier (m. 1957–2015)

Paul Vincent Napier (March 10, 1930 – February 21, 2015) was an American actor. He had small roles in multiple television series, but was known mostly for his roles in over 400 advertisements, especially for General Motors' Certified Service program.

== Biography ==
Napier was born in Rochester, New York. He attended the Aquinas Institute and later graduated from Cornell University. Before his acting career, he worked for the Rochester Americans hockey team as promotions director and was the sports announcer for WBBF. He moved to California in 1960. Napier began serving the Screen Actors Guild (SAG) as a board member in 1979, and helped establish the Screen Actors Guild Awards show first held in 1995. He was named the 2010 recipient of SAG Hollywood's Ralph Morgan Award. Napier coached high school sports around Los Angeles schools during his acting career for over 50 years. Napier died in 2015 and was posthumously honored with the Aquinas Institute's Distinguished Alumnus Award that year.

== Filmography ==
Year	Title	Role	Notes
1966	Fireball 500		
1967	The Born Losers		
1968	The Secret Life of an American Wife	Herb Steinberg	
1977	The Hazing	Detective Henderson	
1986	Getting Even	Reynolds	
1991	Diplomatic Immunity	Kinnick	
2002	Time Changer	Dr. Butler	
