= Wegmans =

Supermarket chain in the United States

Wegmans Food Markets, Inc.

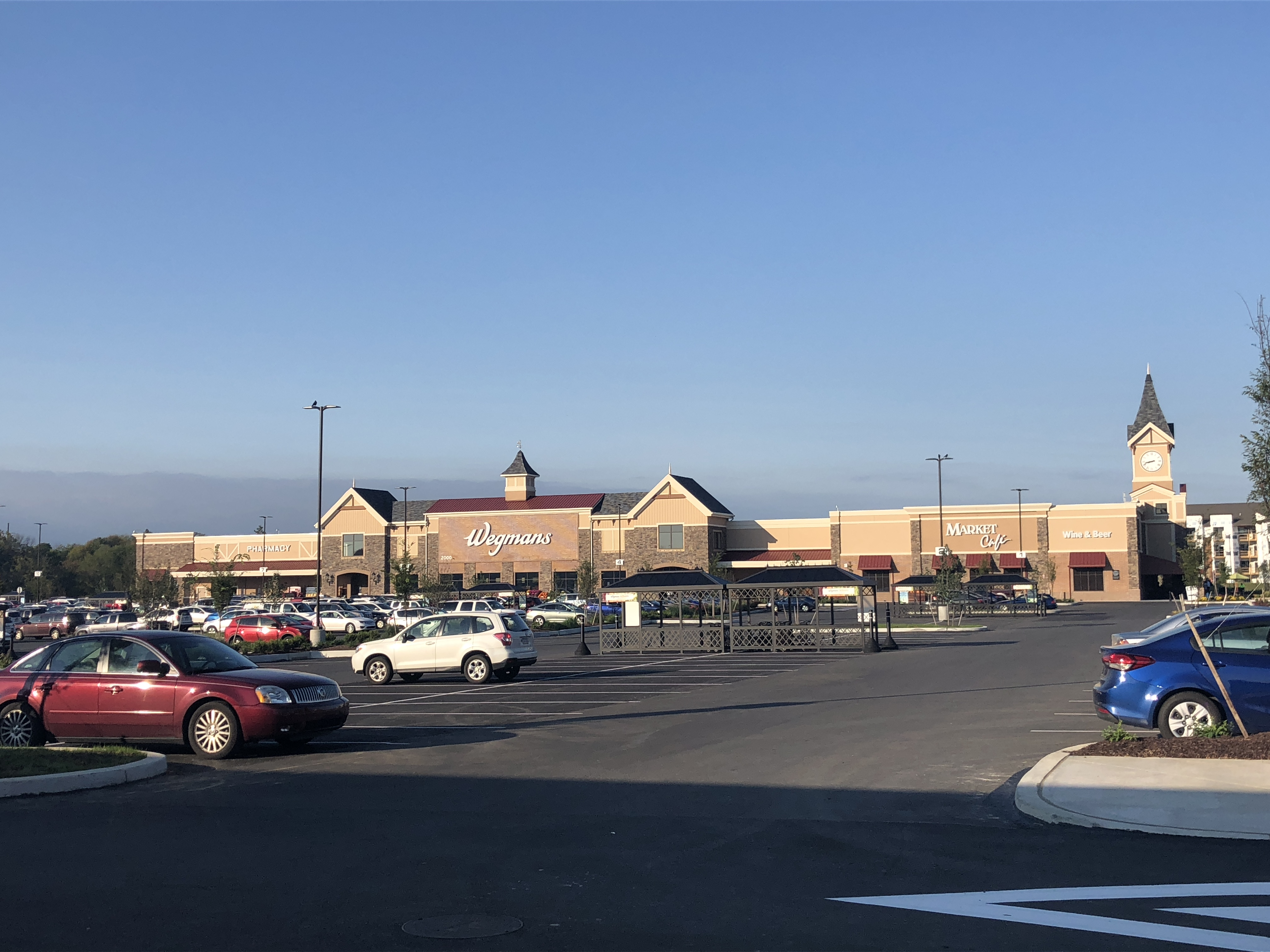
- The exterior of a typical Wegmans, pictured in 2018 in Lancaster, Pennsylvania (Store #135).
- Formerly: Rochester Fruit and Vegetable Company (1916–1930)
- Type: Private
- Industry: Retail (Grocery)
- Founded: January 30, 1916; 110 years ago in Rochester, New York, U.S.
- Founder: John Wegman; Walter Wegman
- Headquarters: Gates, New York, U.S.
- Number of locations: 114 (2026)
- Area served: Connecticut; Delaware; Maryland; Massachusetts; New Jersey; New York; Pennsylvania; Virginia; North Carolina; District of Columbia
- Key people: Colleen J. Wegman (president and CEO); Nicole Wegman (SVP); Danny Wegman (chairman)
- Products: Bakery, delicatessen, dairy, grocery, frozen foods, organic foods, bulk foods, meat, produce, seafood, wine, beer, spirits, floral products, pet supplies, general merchandise, prepared foods, coffee
- Services: Pharmacy, Catering, Coffee Shop, Restaurants
- Revenue: ▲$11.2 billion (2020)
- Owner: Wegman Enterprises, Inc.
- Number of employees: 54,000+ (2026)
- Website: wegmans.com

Wegmans Food Markets, Inc. is a privately held American supermarket chain. As of early 2026, Wegmans had 114 stores in nine states (New York, Pennsylvania, New Jersey, Maryland, Massachusetts, Virginia, North Carolina, Connecticut, and Delaware) and the District of Columbia.

It is headquartered in Gates, New York, and was founded on January 30, 1916, in Rochester, New York. Wegmans has appeared on Fortune's annual "100 Best Companies to Work For" list since the list first appeared in 1998. The company has been listed among the top four on the "100 Best Companies to Work For" list since 2016, but as of 2022, the company was listed among the top six.

== History ==
Wegmans is a privately owned company, founded in 1916 by brothers John and Walter Wegman as the Rochester Fruit and Vegetable Company. Originally started as a produce cart, the first store opened in 1917 at 72 West Main St. in Rochester, New York. Wegmans is headquartered in the Rochester suburb of Gates. Danny Wegman is the chairman. His daughter, Colleen Wegman, has been president and CEO since 2017; his other daughter, Nicole Wegman, is senior vice president. Danny's father, Robert Wegman, who died in 2006, was the previous chairman, and was the son of co-founder Walter. Robert Wegman was a pioneer in the retail food business, as well as a generous donor to educational institutions and other charities. On January 30, 2016, Wegmans celebrated its one hundredth anniversary.

The Wegmans are a Roman Catholic family and have been active in donating to Roman Catholic causes. Robert B. Wegman and Peggy Wegman have donated millions of dollars to Roman Catholic schools in the Diocese of Rochester. The National Catholic Register has praised Wegmans for being one example of "a cadre of privately held companies that have put into practice the Catholic social vision" that human dignity is of greater importance than private profit, claiming that the Wegmans business philosophy "came from the lesson the Sisters of Mercy taught [Robert B. Wegman] as a boy in Catholic elementary school." John H. Garvey, former president of the Catholic University of America, delivered a speech about the Catholic origins of Wegmans at the Religious Freedom & Business Foundation's 2022 gala.

Wegmans eliminated plastic bags from all of its locations by the end of 2022, with paper bags available for a charge of five cents per bag.

Since 2024, Tesla Supercharger electric vehicle fast charging stations have been built at seven Wegmans locations.

=== Expansion ===
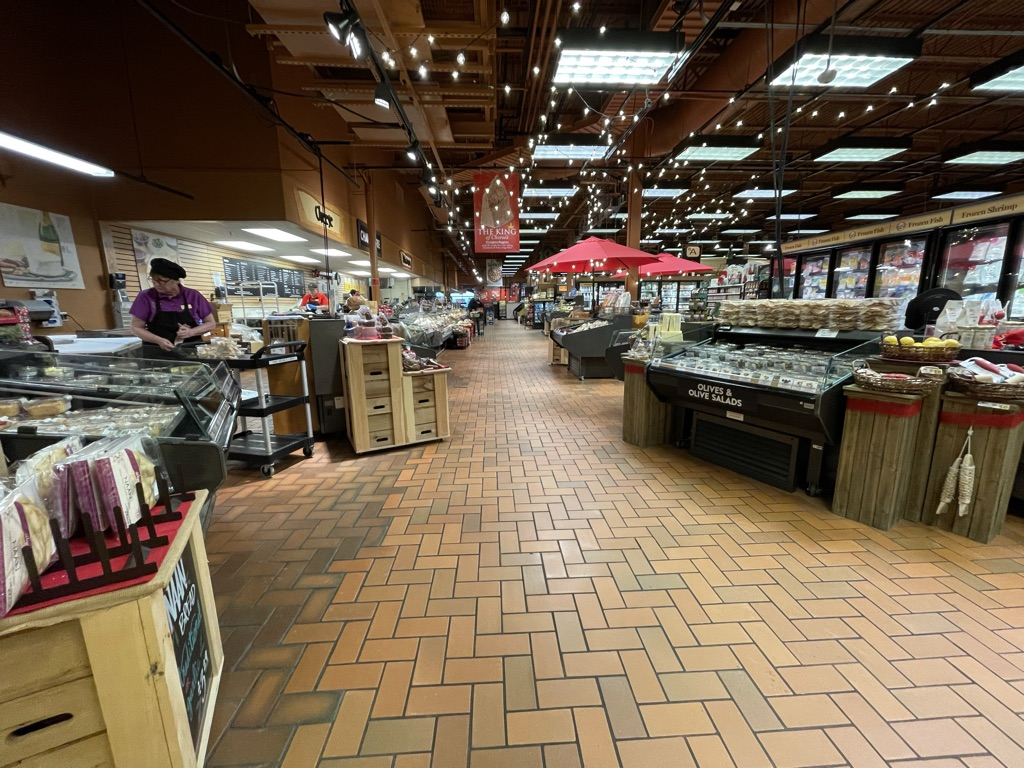
Wegmans interior in Jamestown, New York

In 1965, the chain expanded beyond the Rochester area, with a store in Hornell in the Southern Tier of New York State, then in 1968 in Syracuse, and again in 1977 with its first Buffalo store. The first store outside New York opened in 1993 in Erie, Pennsylvania, and the expansion continued with a store in New Jersey in 1999, Virginia in 2004, Maryland in 2005, Massachusetts in 2011, North Carolina in 2019, and Washington, D.C. and Delaware in 2022. As a part of the company's continued expansion efforts, Wegmans opened its fifth Maryland location in Columbia on June 17, 2012. Its sixth Maryland location opened in Crofton on October 28, 2012, followed by a Germantown location on September 15, 2013. Wegmans opened a store at the Montgomery Mall in North Wales, Pennsylvania, on November 3, 2013, the first store to be part of a shopping mall since the closing of the Midtown Plaza store in Rochester.

Wegmans, having long planned to expand into New England, opened its first store in that region in Northborough, Massachusetts, on October 16, 2011. Wegmans opened two more Massachusetts stores in 2014, in Newton, Chestnut Hill, on April 27, and in Burlington on October 26. Its fourth Massachusetts store opened in Westwood on October 11, 2015. The eighth Maryland store opened in Owings Mills, Maryland, in September 2016. In late 2016, Wegmans opened Virginia stores in Short Pump (August), Midlothian, and Charlottesville (November). The Hanover Township, New Jersey, location opened in July 2017. The Montvale, New Jersey, location opened in September 2017. The Medford, Massachusetts, location opened on November 5, 2017. The Natick, Massachusetts, location opened on April 29, 2018. The Chantilly, Virginia, location opened on June 3, 2018. The Lancaster, Pennsylvania, location opened on September 23, 2018. The Virginia Beach, Virginia, location opened on April 28, 2019. The chain's first store in North Carolina, located in Raleigh, opened on September 29, 2019. It was also the chain's 100th store. The chain's first location in New York City and on Long Island, at Admiral's Row in Brooklyn's Navy Yard, opened on October 27, 2019.

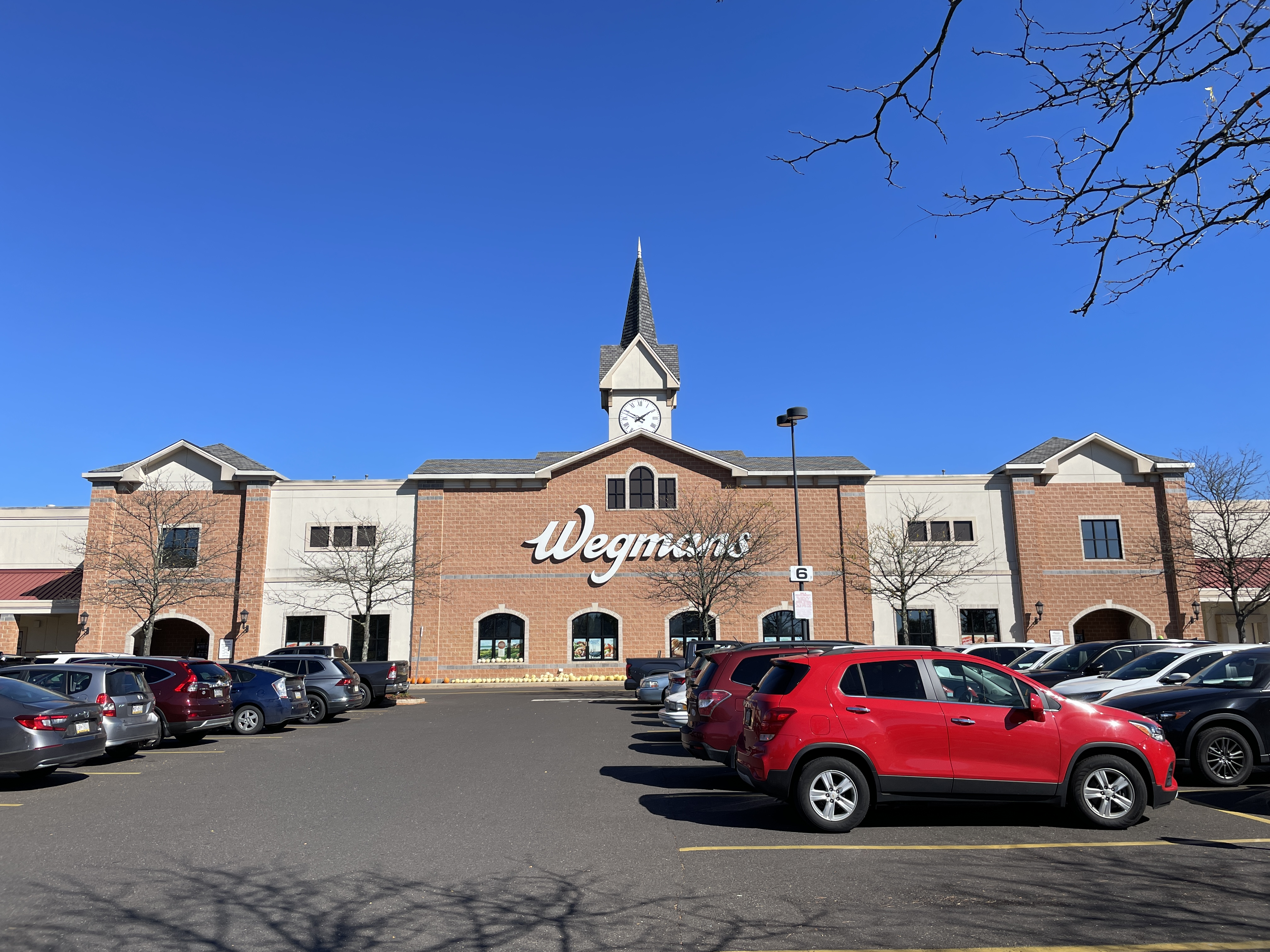
Wegmans store in Warrington, Pennsylvania

The West Cary, North Carolina, location opened on July 29, 2020. The Harrison, New York, location, in Westchester County, opened on August 5, 2020. The Tysons, Virginia, location opened on November 4, 2020. The Chapel Hill, North Carolina, location opened on February 24, 2021. The Wake Forest, North Carolina, location opened on May 19, 2021. The Carlyle, Virginia, location opened on May 11, 2022. The City Ridge, Washington, D.C., location opened on July 13, 2022. The Wilmington, Delaware, location, the chain's first location in that state, opened on October 26, 2022. The Reston, Virginia, location opened on February 1, 2023.

In July 2021, Wegmans announced it would launch the company's first Manhattan store in 2023. The store opened on October 18, 2023, at 770 Broadway, the site of a former Kmart and the historic Wanamaker's department store. In April 2022, Wegmans announced it would open its first Long Island location outside of New York City, located in Lake Grove. The Lake Grove location opened on February 26, 2025. On June 1, 2023, the Natick store (#132), which was located in the Natick Mall, was announced to be closed later that summer. On July 23, 2023, the Natick store closed.

On April 15, 2024, Wegmans announced that they would open their first store in Charlotte, North Carolina, located in the Ballantyne neighborhood, in 2026. The Wegmans in the Ballantyne neighborhood of Charlotte opened on October 14, 2026. On January 13, 2025, Wegmans announced plans for a location in Cranberry Township, Pennsylvania, its first location in the Pittsburgh area. On June 25, 2025, Wegmans opened in Rockville, Maryland. Wegmans opened a store in Norwalk, Connecticut, on July 23, 2025, their first location in Connecticut. A location in Holly Springs, North Carolina was announced in 2019 and is still in development.

Wegmans has previously scrapped plans to build new stores in Annapolis, Maryland; Middletown, New Jersey; Arcola, Virginia; and a second store in Cary, North Carolina.

=== Chase-Pitkin Home and Garden Centers ===
Wegmans was the parent company of Chase-Pitkin, a regional home improvement retailer. On October 4, 2005, Wegmans announced that it would close all Chase-Pitkin stores by early 2006 and focus on its supermarket operations. The decision to exit the home improvement business was reportedly due to the increasing dominance of national chains such as Lowe's and The Home Depot. Chase-Pitkin stores were closed individually at various times throughout March 2006.

=== Discontinuation of tobacco products ===
In January 2008, Wegmans announced that it would no longer sell tobacco products, due to tobacco's negative effects on human health and the environment, and would offer smoking cessation programs to all employees. The decision drew praise from the American Lung Association of New York State, which presented Wegmans with the Lung Champion Award.

== Stores ==
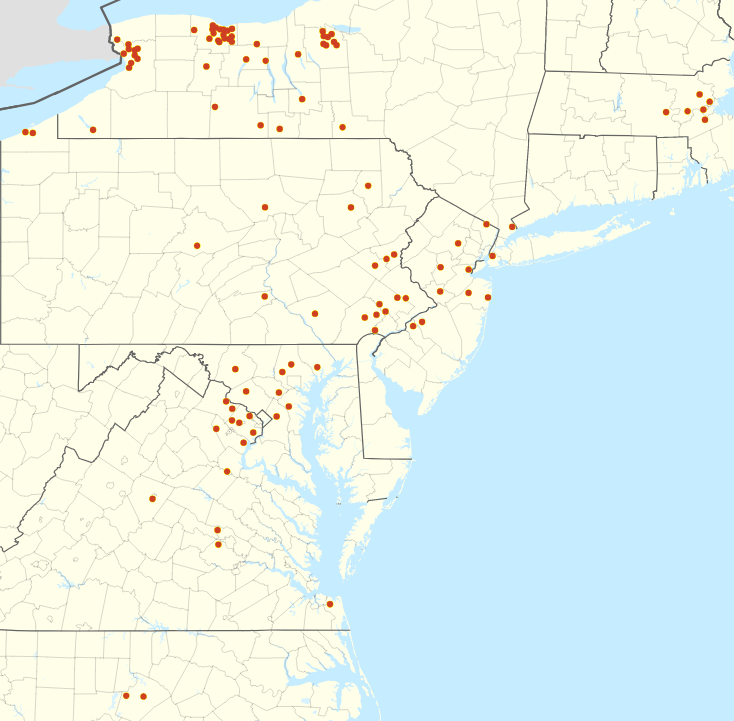
Map of Wegmans stores, as of 2020

Number of Wegmans locations by state
State	No. of locations
Connecticut	1
Delaware	1
District of Columbia	1
Massachusetts	5
Maryland	9
New Jersey	9
New York	50
North Carolina	5 (will be 6)
Pennsylvania	19 (will be 20)
Virginia	15
Total	115 (will be 117)

As of October 2026, Wegmans had 115 stores in operation along the East Coast of the United States.

There are four regions within Wegmans Food Markets, Inc.

- New York: Rochester, Southern Tier, Finger Lakes, Buffalo, and Syracuse
- Pennsylvania/Delaware
- Virginia/North Carolina/Washington D.C. and Maryland
- New Jersey/Metro NY and New England

== Operations ==
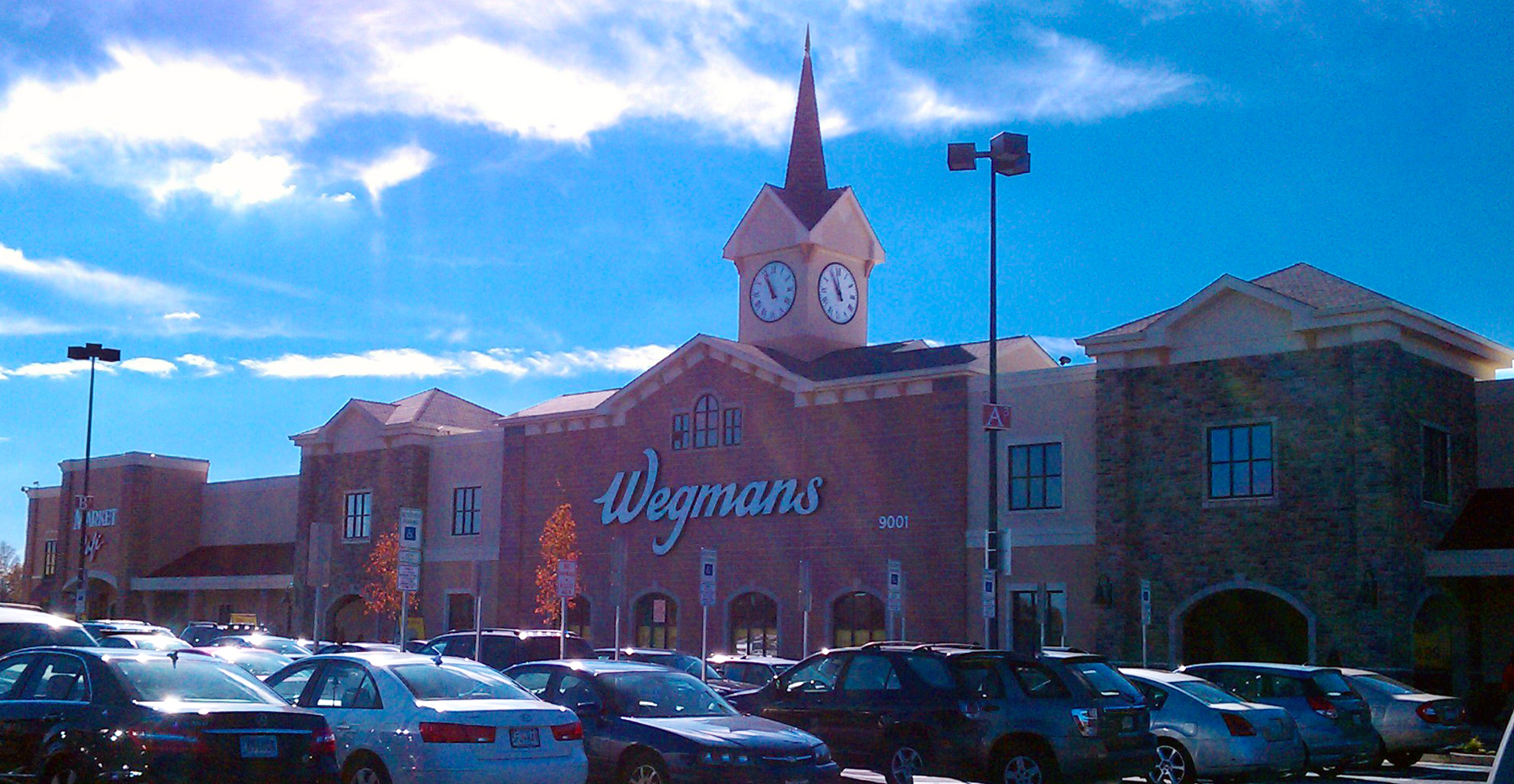
A modern Wegmans storefront circa 2010 (referred to as the "Woodmore" store—store #40). This Wegmans is in Lanham, Maryland (a Washington, D.C., suburb), the second Wegmans in Maryland

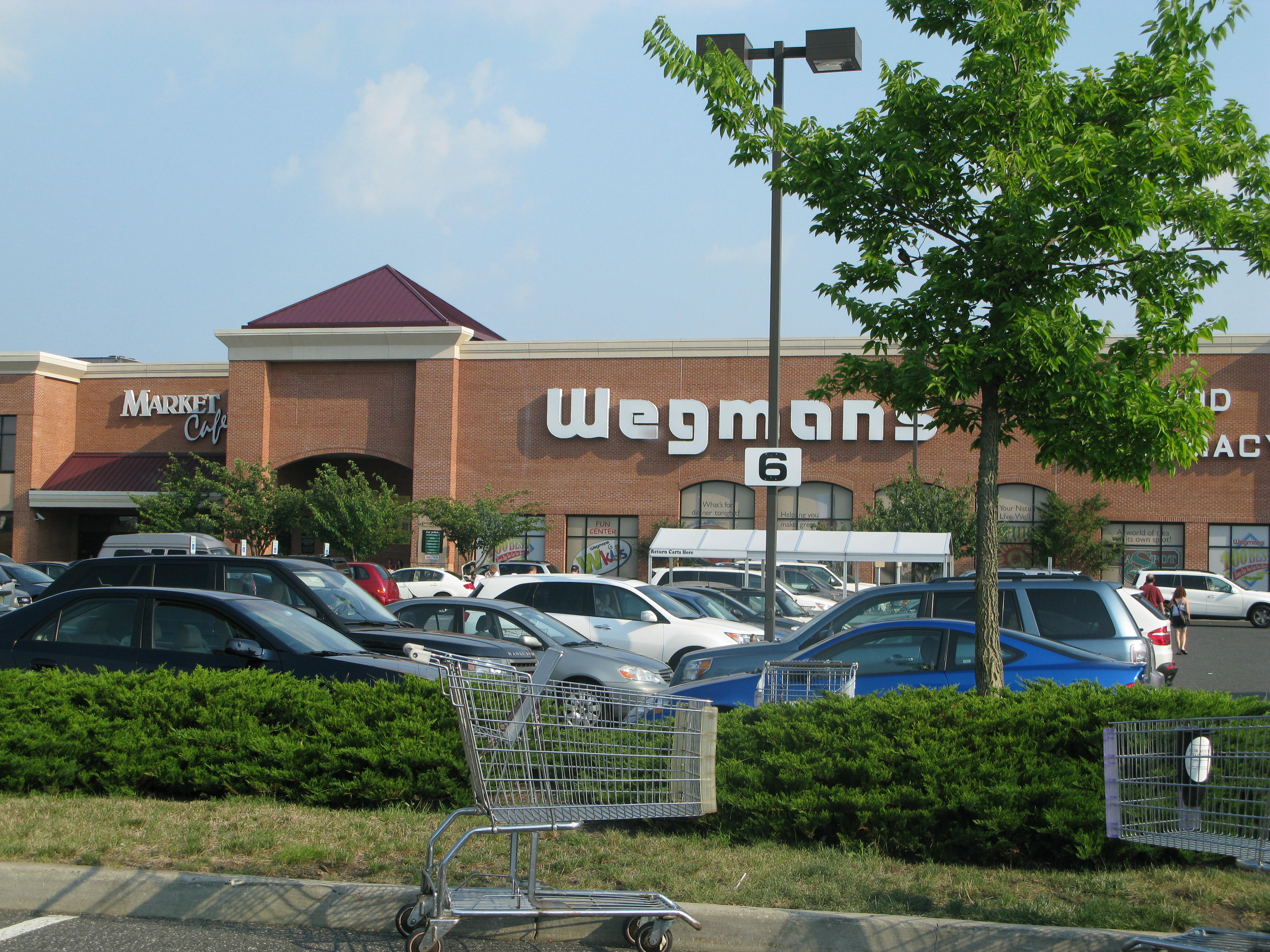
A Wegmans store in Manalapan, New Jersey, in 2009 (Store #95)

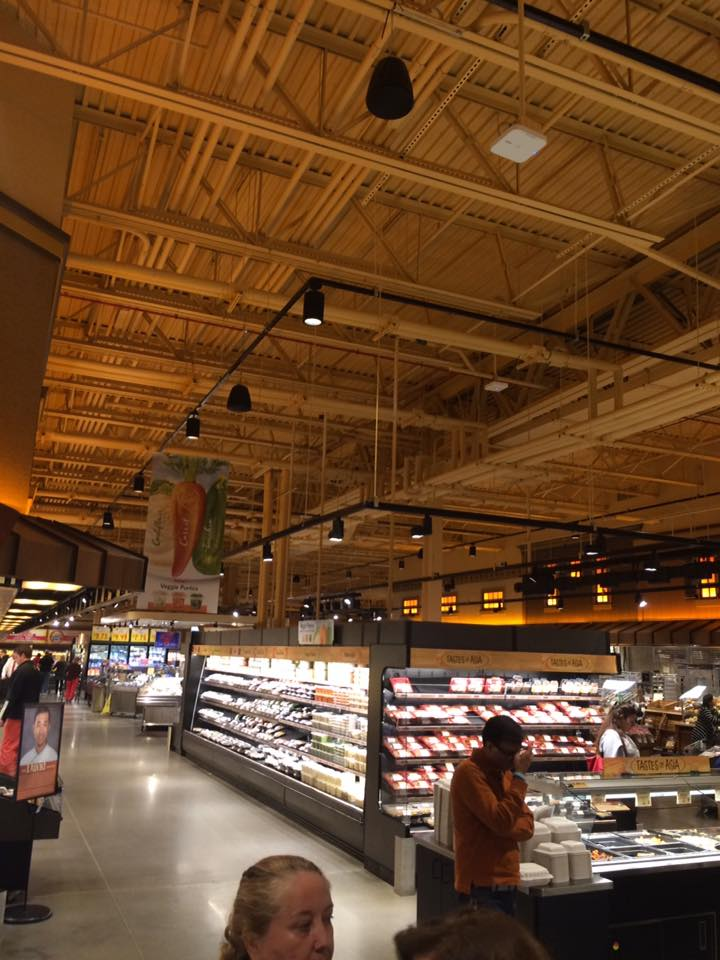
The interior of the Wegmans store in Montvale, New Jersey, 2017 (Store #105)

Wegmans is ranked 29th on the Supermarket News list of the Top 75 North American Food Retailers based on sales volume. In 2009, Stores Magazine showed it to be the 74th-largest retailer in the United States with estimated revenues of $4.67 billion. As of 2006, it was the 66th largest privately held company, as determined by Forbes. On Forbes's 2005 list, Wegmans ranked 54th.

Most of Wegmans' newer stores are of the superstore or megamarket type, with a large area, a variety of foods aimed at an upscale clientele, and, in many stores, Market Café in-store dining areas. From 2002 to 2009, Wegmans owned and operated Tastings, a full-service restaurant at its Pittsford, New York, store. Tastings was replaced by The Food Bar, a "seafood shack"-styled restaurant in the same space; and later by The Burger Bar, serving hamburgers. Along with the Burger Bar, Wegmans offers many other food options. This includes a Sub Shop, Sushi Bar, Pizza Shop, and a Salad Bar – all of which offer quick, prepackaged items for one's convenience. Next Door by Wegmans, a stand-alone restaurant operated by Wegmans, opened across the street from the Pittsford store in 2009.

In January 2007, Wegmans announced two business ventures: (1) opening a 19,000 sq ft (1,800 m^{2}) liquor store in Pittsford (adding to its two existing wine centers, in Virginia and New Jersey); and (2) the creation of a $28 million Culinary Innovation Center in Chili, New York, a corporate research-and-development facility, including a new central kitchen, replacing some of the operations at its meat center. The liquor store opened in April 2008 as Century Pittsford Wines. The store is 45,000 sq ft (4,200 m^{2}). This business model has been replicated at three other New York Wegmans locations: in Buffalo, DeWitt, and Johnson City. Ownership of each liquor store is held by a different member of the Wegman family, due to New York State regulations prohibiting individuals or corporations from owning multiple liquor stores.

After Wegmans updated its logo to a script font, in November 2010, Walgreens filed a trademark infringement lawsuit against Wegmans, claiming the "W" in the Wegmans logo was too similar to that of Walgreens. The lawsuit was settled in April 2011, with Wegmans agreeing to discontinue use of its "W" logo by June 2012, although the supermarket retains the right to use the "Wegmans" name in script. According to Jo Natale, Wegmans director of media relations, "The cost of making relatively minor changes to a limited number of products was much less than the cost of litigating this case to the end."

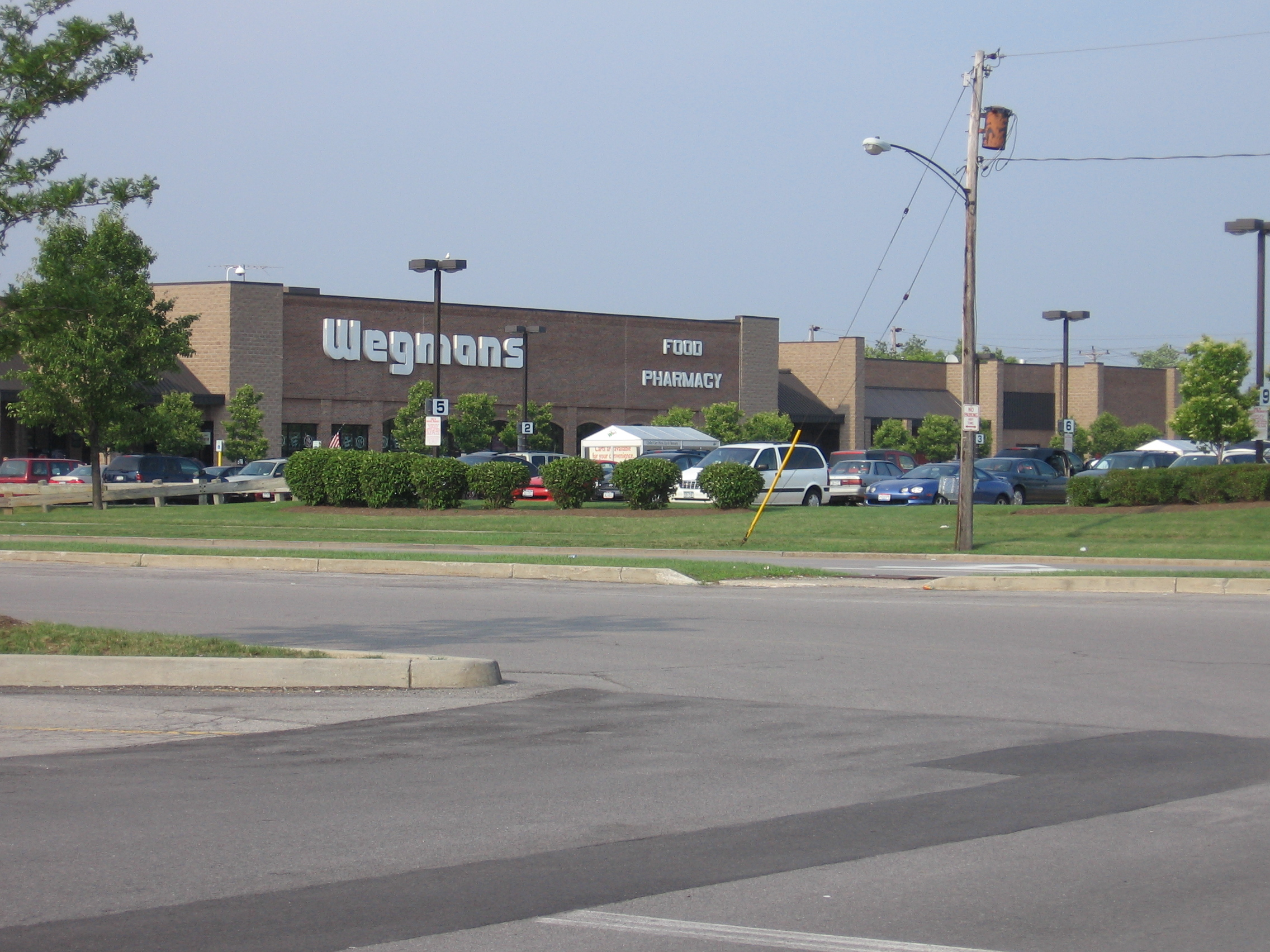
Exterior of a Wegmans store in Amherst, New York, known as the "Alberta Drive" location (Store #82), in 2006, in the style common in the late 1990s

Wegmans offers a pick-up service called "personal shopping" at selected locations. In June 2017, Wegmans partnered with Instacart to provide home delivery service. In February 2020, Wegmans announced that its Brooklyn store would offer grocery delivery to Manhattan residents as an expansion to its Instacart partnership. Delivery fees start at $3.99, and Manhattan customers are given a two- to five-hour delivery window.

In April 2020, in response to the COVID-19 outbreak, Wegmans began limiting the number of people in its stores, provided its employees with masks, and installed plexiglass shields at all checkout areas.

In 2024, the supermarket chain was sued in New York County Supreme Court by Japanese restaurant owner Yuji Haraguchi for stealing “trade secrets, practices, and financial information” after Wegman employees were trained at his East Village sushi restaurant Okasana. Wegmans allegedly broke a non-disclosure agreement and a non-compete agreement and never got back to Haraguchi after opening a sushi section, Sakanaya, in their Astor Place location.

== Wegmans brand ==
In 1979, Wegmans began offering their own house brand of some products. These Wegmans brand products are typically those that get discounted under their rewards program. The Wegmans brand has gradually expanded. In 1992, it began another line of products, "Food You Feel Good About", which contain no artificial colors, flavors, or preservatives. The next sub-brand to be launched was Italian Classics in 1995, which introduced pastas, canned tomatoes, and olive oils imported from Italy. In 2002, Wegmans launched a line of organic products.

== Accolades ==
Food Network recognized it with its award for Best Grocery Store in 2007. Consumer Reports subscribers voted Wegmans the top grocery store in 2017; it has held the top spot since 2006. It was also profiled as part of the "Here Are The Jobs" segment on MSNBC's PoliticsNation in 2012. In 2016, Market Force surveyed over 10,000 grocery store shoppers nationwide, and Wegmans was rated "America's favorite grocery store". Wegmans has also been featured in Fortune magazine as one of the top 25 companies to work with.
