= Peter Maris =

American film director

- Occupations: Director, Producer, editor
- Years active: 1979–2007

Peter Maris is a film director, producer and editor and has over 30 films to his credit. He has also connected with SAGIndie and the Fresno Film Commission.

== Background ==
Maris was born in Greece and has lived in California for many years. At present he lives in Fresno.

== Film work ==
Among his early work was the cult film Delirium in 1979 that starred Turk Cekovsky and Barron Winchester. In 1988 he directed Terror Squad.

== Filmography ==
=== Director ===
- Zombie Hunters - 2007
- The Survivor - 2006
- Finish Line: A Cruise Down Memory Lane - 2005
- Warpath - 2000
- Alien Species - 1996
- The Killer Inside - 1996
- Phantasmagoria - 1995 (video game)
- Can It Be Love - 1992
- Diplomatic Immunity - 1991
- Hangfire - 1991
- Ministry of Vengeance - 1989
- Viper - 1988
- Terror Squad - 1988
- Land of Doom - 1986
- Curse of the Red Butterfly - 1982
- Delirium - 1979
