= Alfred E. Smith Building =

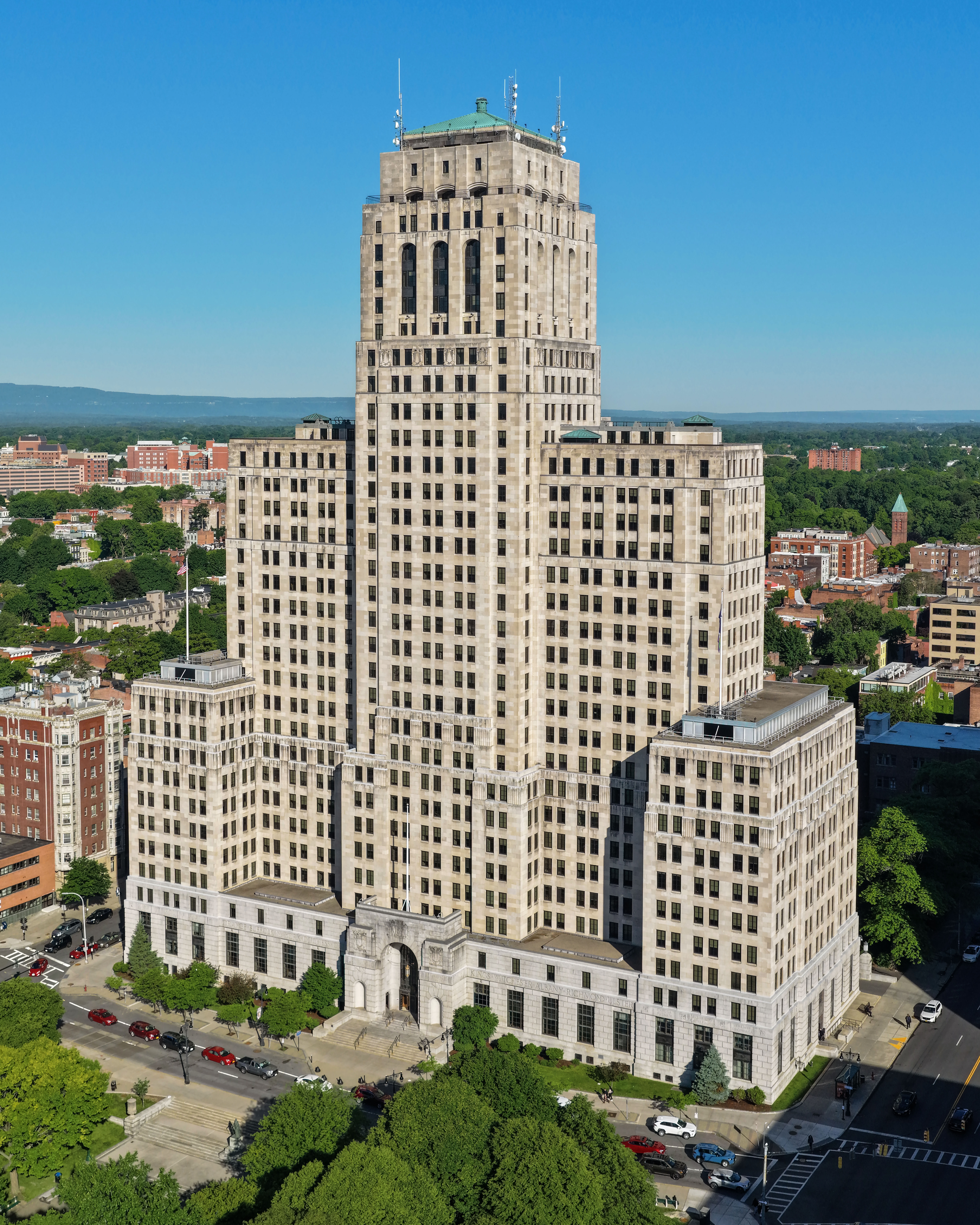
- Alfred E. Smith Building viewed from the east
- Interactive map of the Alfred E. Smith Building area
- Former names: State Office Building

General information
- Type: Office building
- Architectural style: Art Deco
- Location: Albany, New York, United States
- Coordinates: 42.653986°N 73.75993°W
- Construction started: 1927
- Completed: 1930
- Opened: 1931

Height
- Height: 387 ft (118 m)

Technical details
- Floor count: 34

Design and construction
- Architects: William E. Haugaard and Sullivan W. Jones

The Alfred E. Smith Building, known officially as the Alfred E. Smith State Office Building (formerly the State Office Building) and sometimes called simply the Smith Building, is a structure located in downtown Albany, New York across the street from the New York State Capitol and One Commerce Plaza. The building's namesake, Alfred Emmanuel Smith, was a four-term governor of New York and the Democratic Party's nomination for the 1928 presidential election. The Art Deco skyscraper has 34 stories and as of December 2024, is Albany's second tallest structure (after the Erastus Corning Tower) at 388 feet (118 m). Completed in 1930, it houses offices of the New York State government.

== History ==
In 1926, the New York State Legislature allocated $1 million to purchase the site for a new government office building at Swan Street between Washington Avenue and State Street in Albany, New York. Subsequently, buildings at the site were demolished to make way for the new office building. This would have included the 8-story Fort Frederick Apartments. The apartment, however, was moved to the adjacent plot at State Street using railroad tracks in late 1926. The relocation project was managed by John Eichleay Jr. Company of Pittsburgh.

Construction of the Smith Building began in 1927. It was designed by William E. Haugaard and Sullivan W. Jones.

The office building was completed in 1930. Upon its completion, it became the tallest building in Albany. It was then opened to the public in 1931. At the time of its opening, the building was called the "State Office Building". The State Legislature later renamed it to "Alfred E. Smith State Office Building" in 1945.

It was built originally with an open-air observation deck on the 31st floor, 350 feet (110 m) above the ground; this deck was closed in 1976 when the enclosed Corning Tower Observation Deck on the 42nd floor, 589 feet (180 m) up, was opened.

An extensive renovation of the building began in 2002. The project was managed by BBL Construction Services and URS. This modernization, which cost at least $103 million, was completed in 2006.

== Design ==
The Alfred E. Smith Building has several distinctive features. These include the engraving of the names of all 62 New York State counties around the street-level facade and an Art Deco lobby with a mural depicting famous New Yorkers. A tunnel connects the building to the Capitol. The skyscraper is constructed of limestone and granite, and has views of Albany and the nearby landscape.

== Tenants ==
Prior to reconstruction, the building was home to the state Comptroller's Office. With the renovation complete, the new tenants include the New York State Department of Civil Service, Department of State, New York State Banking Department, New York State Liquor Authority, and Division of the Budget.

== Gallery ==
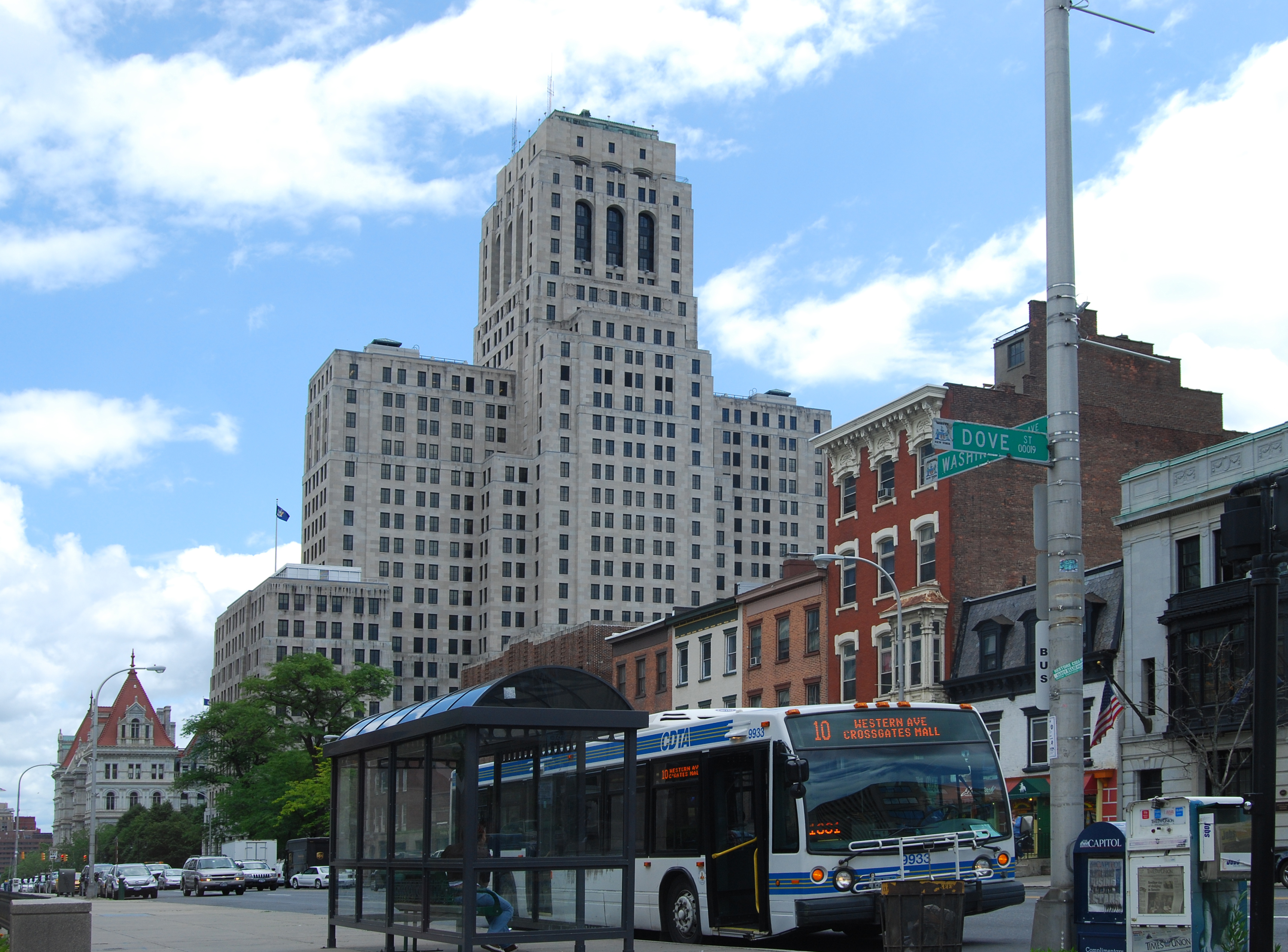
View of the northwest façade

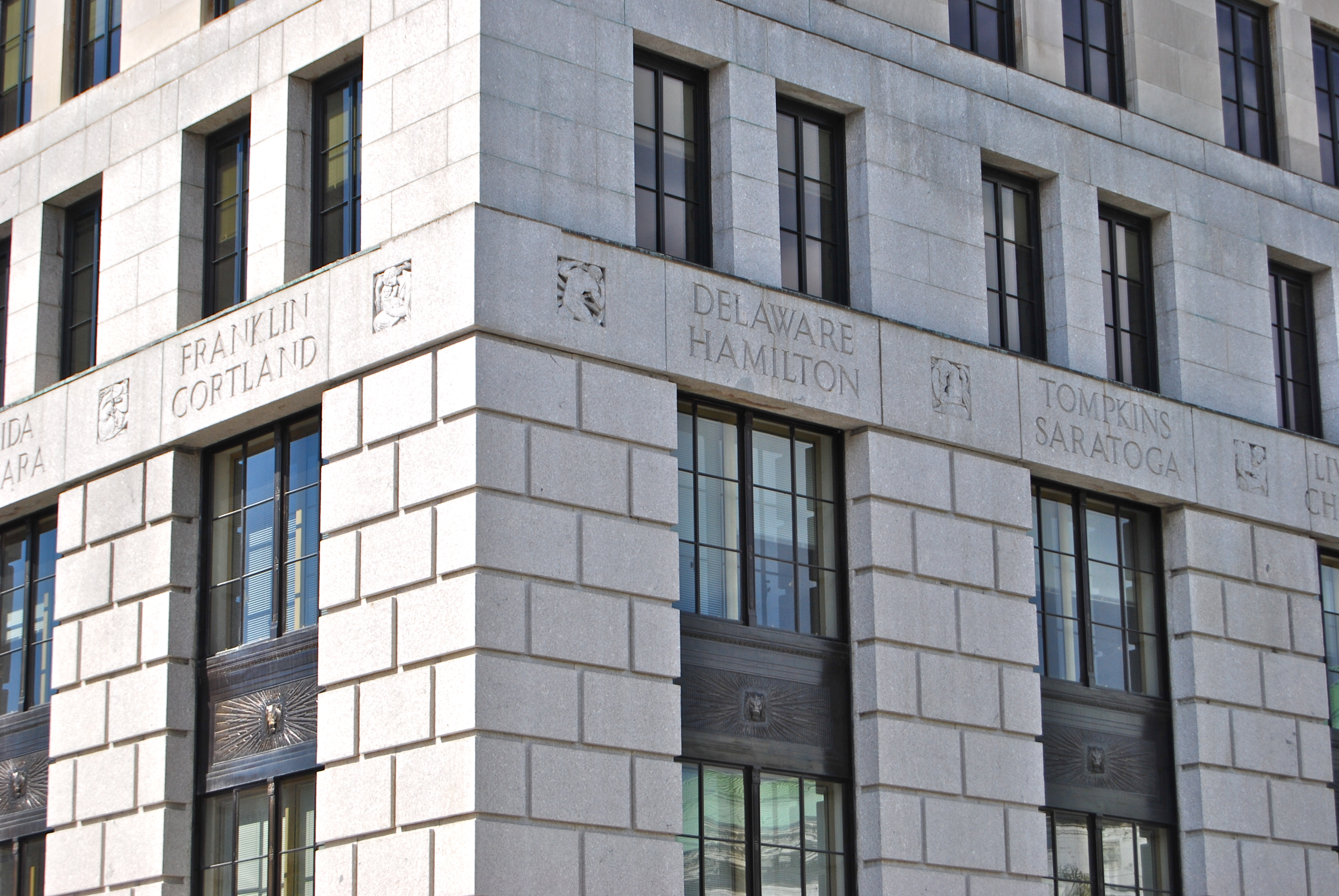
Each county is inscribed in the building

== See also ==
- List of tallest buildings in Albany, New York
