= List of tallest buildings in Albany =

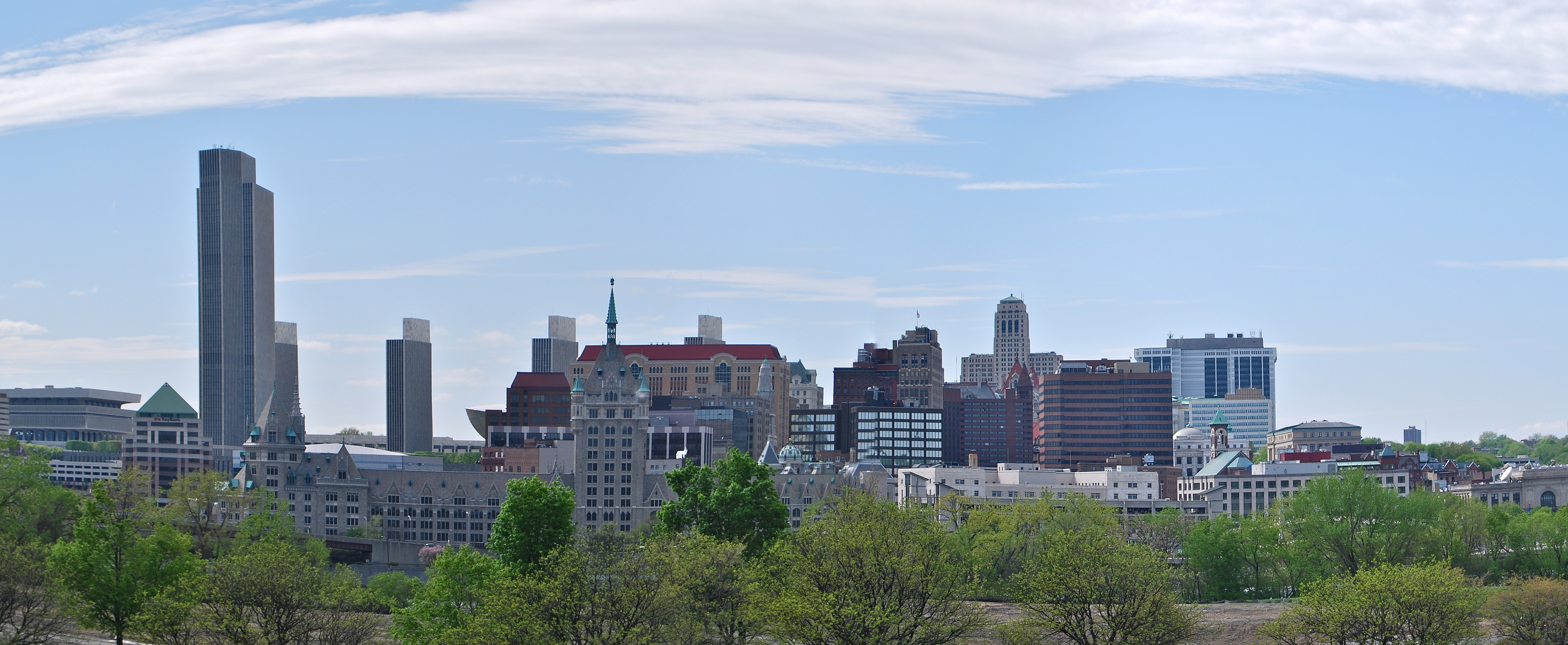
Skyline of Albany

The city of Albany, in the U.S. state of New York is the site of 56 high-rises, 19 of which stand taller than 150 ft (46 m). The tallest building in the city is the 44-story Erastus Corning Tower, which is 610 ft (186 m) tall. Completed in 1973, it is the tallest building in New York state outside New York City. The second-tallest building is the Alfred E. Smith State Office Building, which stands 387 ft (118 m). Four buildings tie for third-tallest in Albany at 310 ft (94 m), all of which belong to the Empire State Plaza.

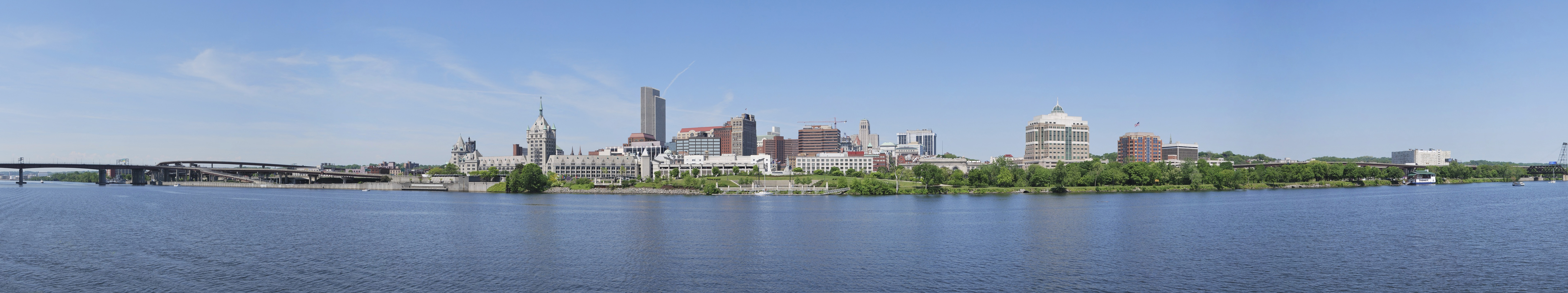
Panorama of Albany from across the Hudson River

== Tallest buildings ==
Was the tallest building in Albany upon completion

Rank	Name	Image	Height	Floors	Use	Built	Notes
1	Erastus Corning Tower, Empire State Plaza		589 feet (180 m)	44	Governmental office	1973	Also the tallest building in Upstate New York. Also known as the Mayor Erastus Corning 2nd Tower, and the Corning Tower
2	Alfred E. Smith State Office Building		388 feet (118 m)	34	Governmental office	1930	Was the tallest building in Upstate New York until completion of Buffalo City Hall the following year. Officially known as the Alfred E. Smith State Office Building. Formerly known as the State Office Building and Simply known as the Smith Building.
3, 4, 5, 6	1, 2, 3, and 4 Empire State Plaza		310 feet (94 m)	23	Governmental office	1973	Also known as the Agency Buildings, Governor Nelson A. Rockefeller Empire State Plaza, South Mall or Albany Mall
7, 8, 9	Eastman, Livingston, and Stuyvesant Towers, University at Albany		286 feet (87 m)	22	Student residence halls	1967	Albany's city line runs directly through the university campus. A fourth residence hall of identical height (Mohawk Tower) also exists but lies within the unincorporated Town of Guilderland.
10	New York State Comptroller's Headquarters		270 feet (82 m)	15	Governmental office	2001	
11	Home Savings Bank Building		267 feet (81 m)	19	Commercial office	1927	
12	Albany City Savings Bank Building		265 feet (81 m)	11	Commercial office	1903	Also known as Home and the City Savings Bank Building. Formerly known as the City and County Savings Bank Building.
13	One Commerce Plaza		252 feet (77 m)	20	Commercial office	1971	Also known as the Twin Towers
14	New York State Department of Environmental Conservation Headquarters		225 feet (69 m)	13	Governmental office	2001	
15	New York State Capitol		220 feet (67 m)	5	Capitol	1899	
16	69 State Street		213 feet (65 m)	17	Commercial office	1927	
17	90 State Street		212 feet (65 m)	14	Apartment building	1930	
18=	Cathedral of the Immaculate Conception		210 feet (64 m)	1	Church	1853	
18=	Albany City Hall		210 feet (64 m)	11	City Hall	1883	
20	Capitol Green Apartments		207 feet (63 m)	23	Apartment building	1973	
21	40 North Pearl Street		204 feet (62 m)	16	Commercial office	1976	

== See also ==
- List of tallest buildings in Upstate New York
