= New York State Capitol =

Legislative building in Albany, New York, U.S.

Coordinates: 42.652553°N 73.757323°W

- The New York State Capitol viewed from the southwest

General information
- Architectural style: Romanesque Revival, Neo-Renaissance
- Location: Albany, New York, United States
- Construction started: 1867; 159 years ago
- Completed: 1899; 127 years ago
- Cost: $25 million
- Client: State of New York

Design and construction
- Architects: Thomas Fuller; Leopold Eidlitz; Henry Hobson Richardson; Isaac G. Perry
- New York State Capitol
- U.S. National Register of Historic Places
- U.S. National Historic Landmark
- U.S. Historic district – Contributing property
- New York State Register of Historic Places
- Interactive map of New York State Capitol
- Part of: Lafayette Park Historic District (ID78001837)
- NRHP reference No.: 71000519
- NYSRHP No.: 00140.000311

Significant dates
- Added to NRHP: February 18, 1971
- Designated NHL: January 29, 1979
- Designated CP: November 15, 1978
- Designated NYSRHP: June 23, 1980

The New York State Capitol, the seat of the New York state government, is located in Albany, the capital city of the U.S. state of New York. The capitol building is part of the Empire State Plaza complex on State Street in Capitol Park. Housing the New York State Legislature, the building was completed in 1899 at a cost of US$25 million (equivalent to $794 million in modern dollars), making it the most expensive government building of its time. It was listed on the National Register of Historic Places in 1971, then included as a contributing property when the Lafayette Park Historic District was listed in 1978. The New York State Capitol was declared a National Historic Landmark in 1979.

== History ==
The Old State Capitol, in use from 1812 to 1879

Legislative sessions had been held at different buildings in different places before Albany was declared the State capital in 1797. From that time until 1811, the State Legislature met at the Old Albany City Hall. The first State Capitol was designed by Albany native Philip Hooker, started in 1804, inaugurated in 1812 and remained in use until 1879 when the current building was inaugurated.

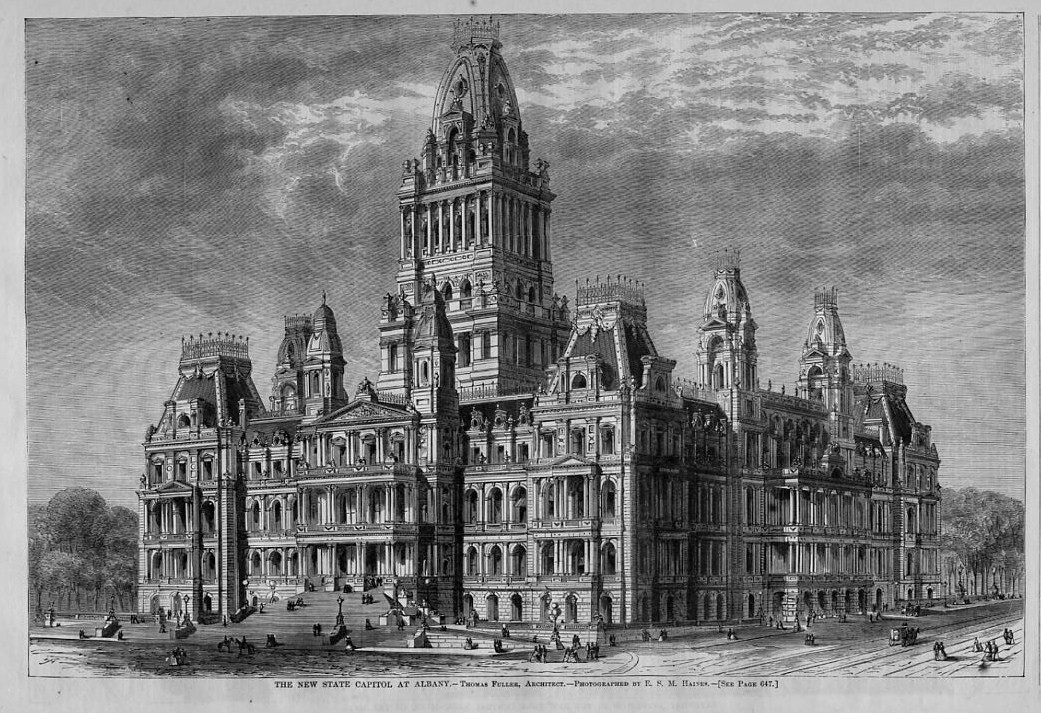
Interim plan for the Capitol by Thomas Fuller

The present Capitol was built between 1867 and 1899. Three teams of architects worked on the design of the Capitol during the 32 years of its construction, managed by: Thomas Fuller (1867–1875), Leopold Eidlitz and Henry Hobson Richardson (1875–1883), and Isaac G. Perry (1883–1899). Fuller, the initial architect, was an Englishman who also designed the Canadian Parliament buildings of Parliament Hill, Ottawa.

The state capitol's ground floor was built in the Classical/Romanesque style. Lieutenant Governor William Dorsheimer then dismissed Fuller in favor of Eidlitz and Richardson who built the next two floors in a Renaissance Classical style, noticeable on the exterior two floors as light, open column work. The increasing construction costs became an ongoing source of conflict in the legislature, and it was difficult to secure the necessary funding. Eidlitz and Richardson were dismissed by Grover Cleveland upon his election to governorship and his review of the increasing costs of construction. He hired Perry to complete the project. The legislative chambers, the fourth floor and roof work were all finished in Victorian-modified Romanesque that was distinctively Richardson's design. It "was Richardson who dominated the final outcome of the grand building, which evolved into his distinguished Romanesque style" (which came to be known as Richardsonian Romanesque). It is claimed Richardson was imitating the Hôtel de Ville (City Hall) in Paris, France. The Chazy limestone for its construction was quarried at the Clark Quarry in Essex County, New York.

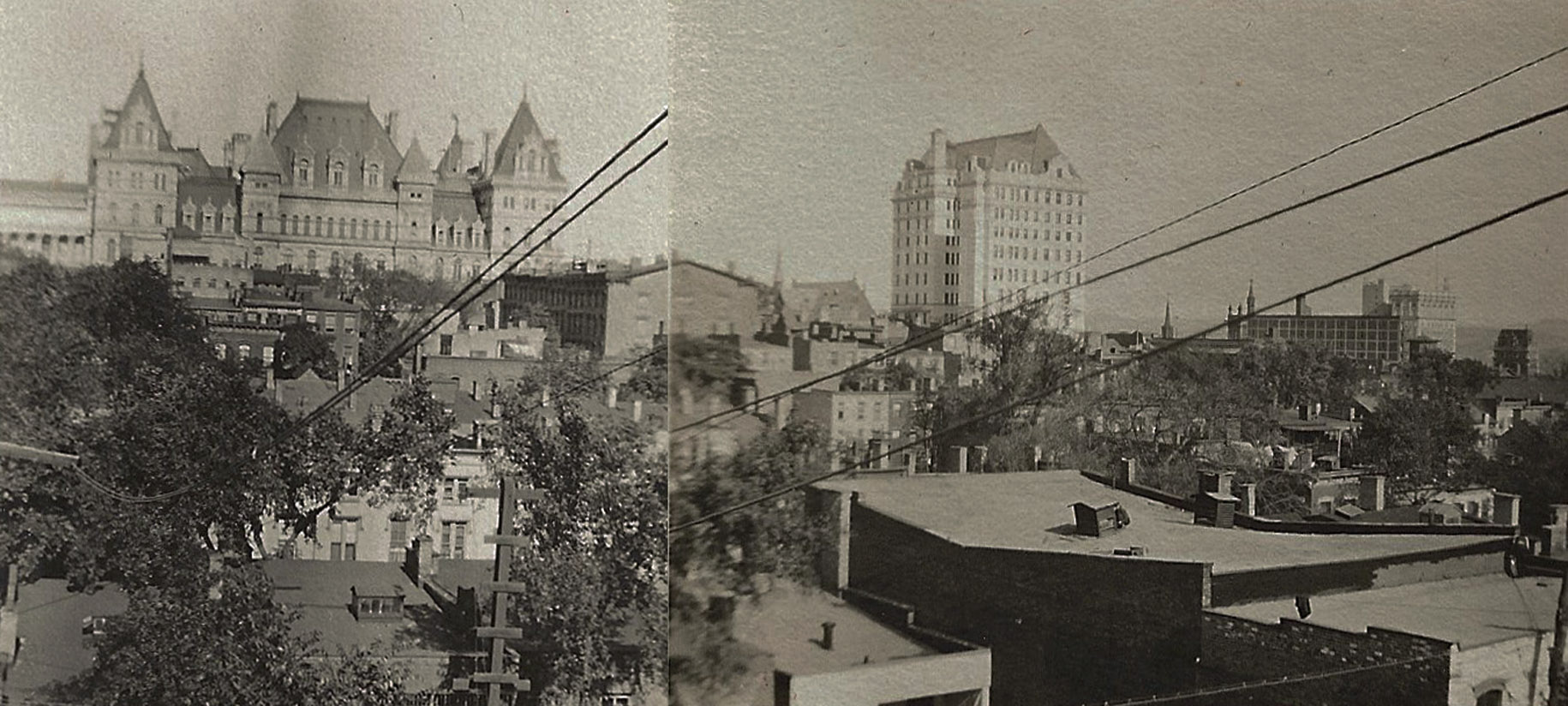
Capitol building in 1919, photograph taken from Madison Avenue, southwest on hill

The central open court is dominated by a shaft intended to support a massive dome. The dome and tower were never completed, as it was found the building's weight was causing stress fractures and making the building shift downhill toward State Street. To stop this movement, a large, 166-foot (51 m) long exterior Eastern Staircase was added to support the front facade. The Capitol exterior is made of white granite from Hallowell, Maine, and the building incorporates Westchester marble cut by state prisoners at Sing Sing. The granite structure is 220 feet (67 m) tall at its highest point, and it is one of eleven U.S. state capitols that does not have a domed roof. Tunnels connect it to the Empire State Plaza and Alfred E. Smith Building. The building's exterior underwent restoration from 2000 until fall 2014, and significant historical details were restored. A previously covered skylight over the Great Western Staircase was uncovered and restored to functionality, and the Ludowici tile on the roof was replaced with new material from the original producer.

The Assembly Chamber was built with the world's largest open arched span. However, this produced very inconvenient acoustic results. A more serious problem was the structure's shifting foundations that made the vaults unstable. A lower false ceiling was introduced to prevent rock shards from the vaults from falling to the Assembly floor.

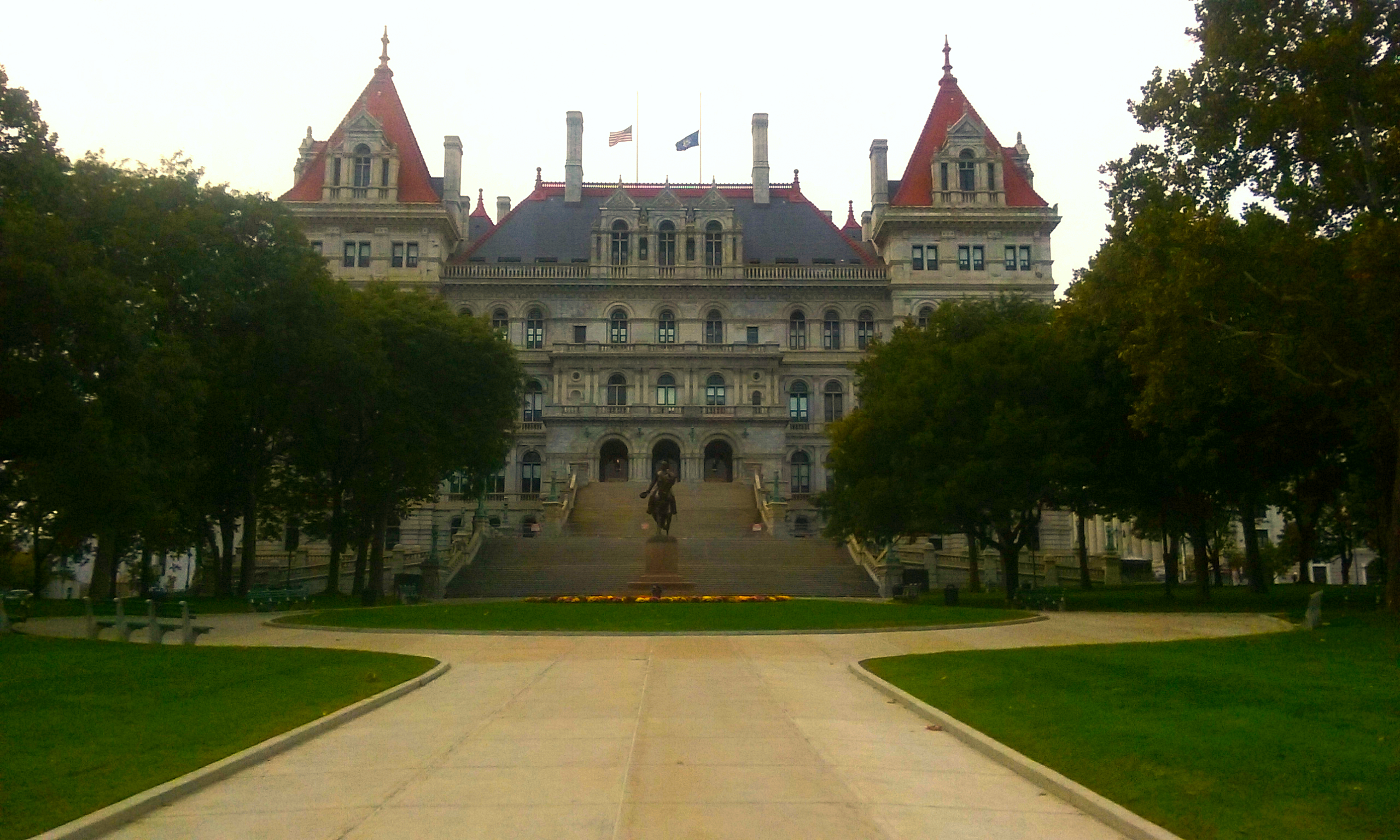
New York State Capitol Building in 2018

The Capitol initially featured two large murals by Boston artist William Morris Hunt painted directly on to the Assembly Chamber's sandstone walls. The two enormous works, named The Flight of Night and The Discoverer, each some 45-feet long, were later covered when the Assembly's vaulted ceiling proved unstable and the ceiling was lowered four feet below the murals. Earlier, the murals had been damaged by moisture in the building and had begun to flake. Plans for later murals by Hunt were abandoned due to lack of funding, and some people have speculated the resulting depression experienced by the artist may have contributed to his suicide.

The ceiling murals of battle scenes in the Governor's Reception Room, also known as the War Room, are the work of William de Leftwich Dodge.

In front of the Capitol is an equestrian sculpture of Civil War General Philip Sheridan, designed by John Quincy Adams Ward and Daniel Chester French and completed in 1916.

== 1911 fire ==
In the early morning hours of March 29, 1911, four days after the Triangle Shirtwaist Factory fire in Manhattan killed 165 garment workers, a disaster that led to the state being the first to establish a state Department of Labor, a fire started in the Assembly library. Its cause has never been established; theories suggest either an electrical problem or a dropped cigar. A night watchman was the only fatality, but thousands of volumes in the state library, almost its entire collection, and many documents and artifacts in the state museum's collections, then housed in the building, were destroyed. The flames reached 200 feet (61 m) at one point, requiring the evacuation of nearby homes; the fire took 125 firefighters to extinguish.

Heat from the fire was intense enough to twist framing in a skylight above the building's western stairs and melt their sandstone filigree. The building's southwest corner was devastated. It took three months to clear the rubble and then a year to rebuild it, at a cost of $5 million ($117 million today).

== Visiting and tours ==
External videos
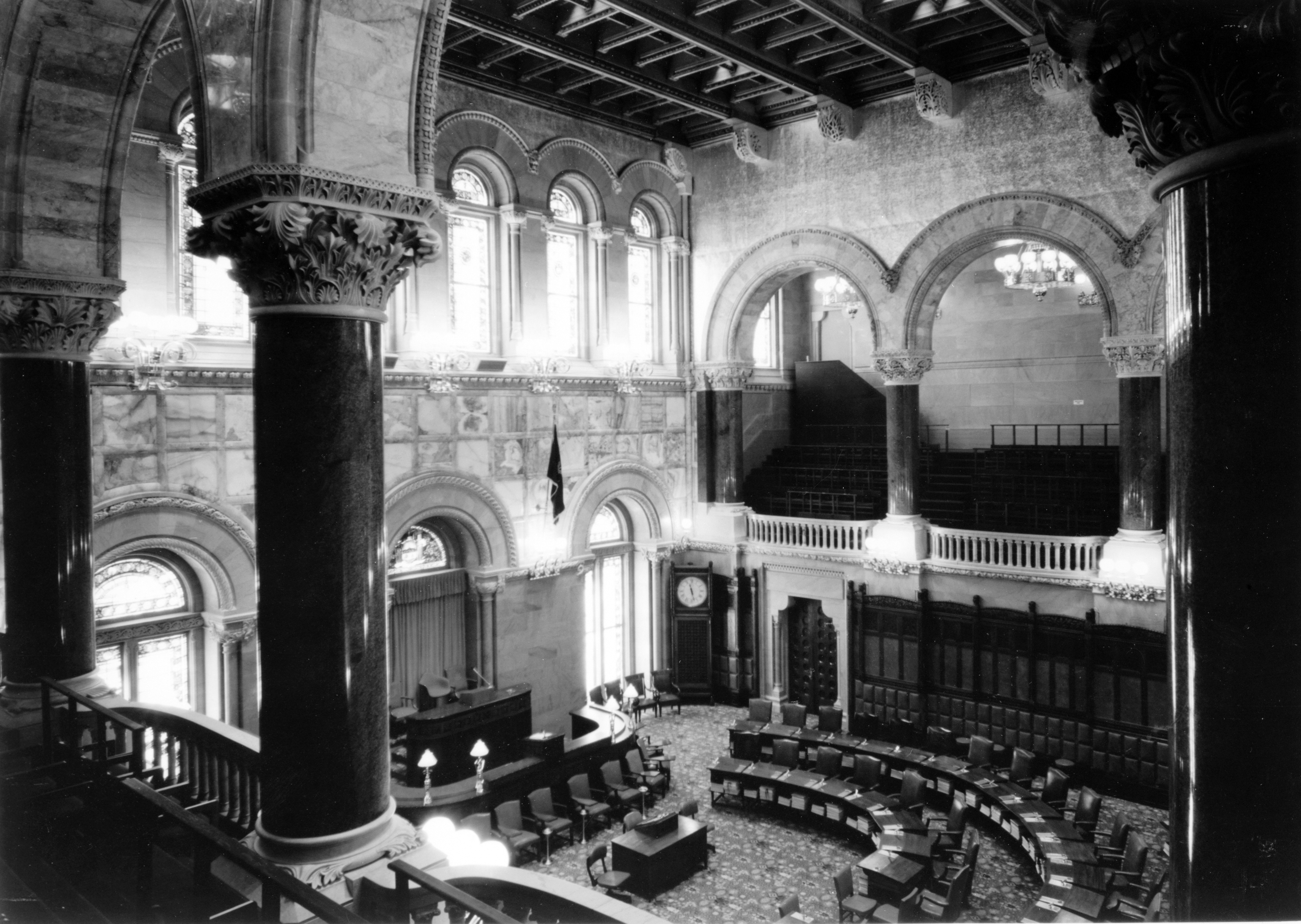
- New York State Capitol (12:35), C-SPAN

The New York State Capitol is open Monday through Friday from 7 a.m. until 7 p.m. The building is closed most weekends and holidays. Official guided tours of the Capitol are offered at various times beginning at the Information Desk located in the State Street Lobby. There is a Visitor Center for the New York State Capitol and Empire State Plaza, located on the Concourse Level of the Plaza near the underground entrance to the Capitol.

== Gallery ==
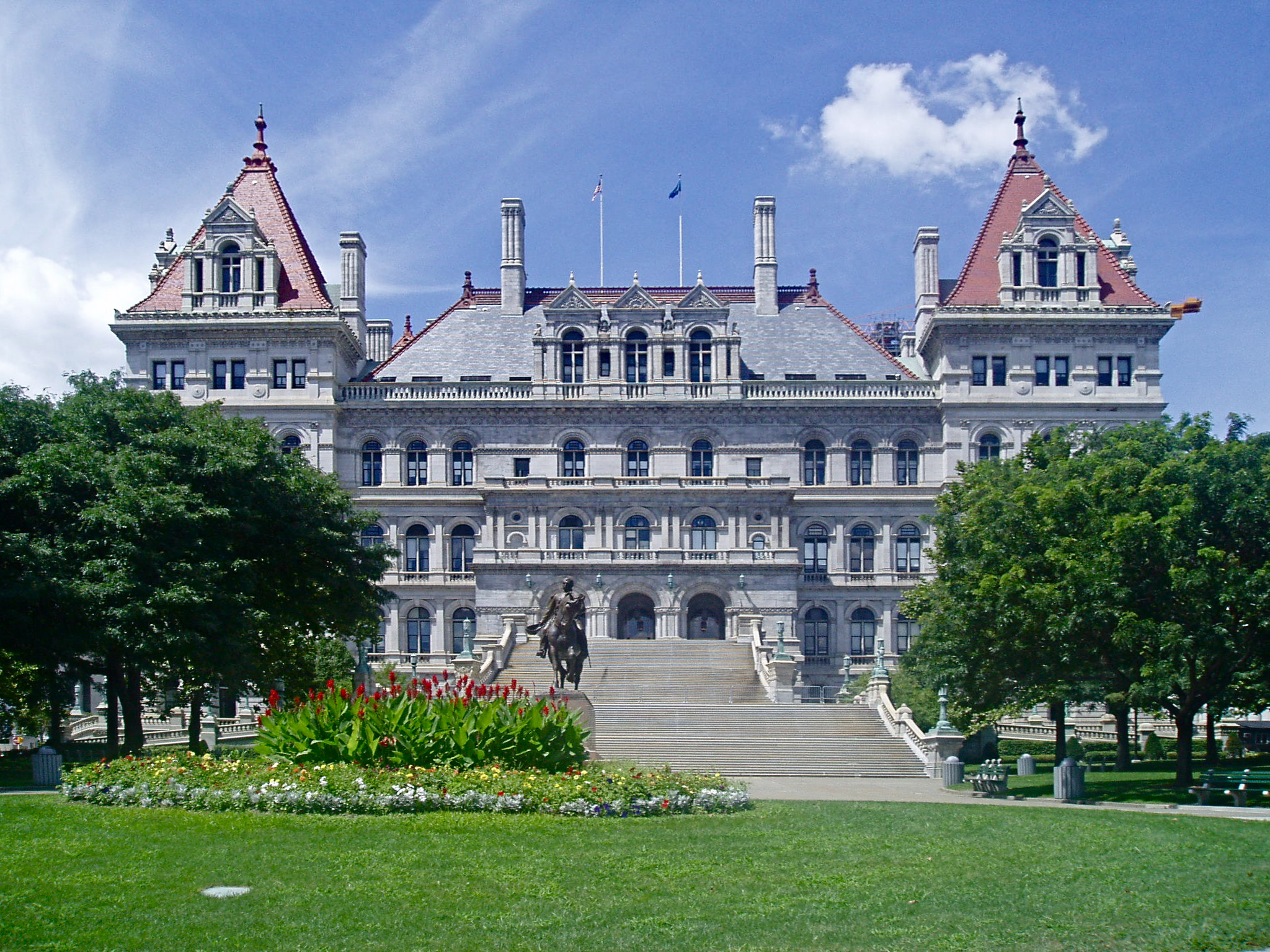
View from the southeast

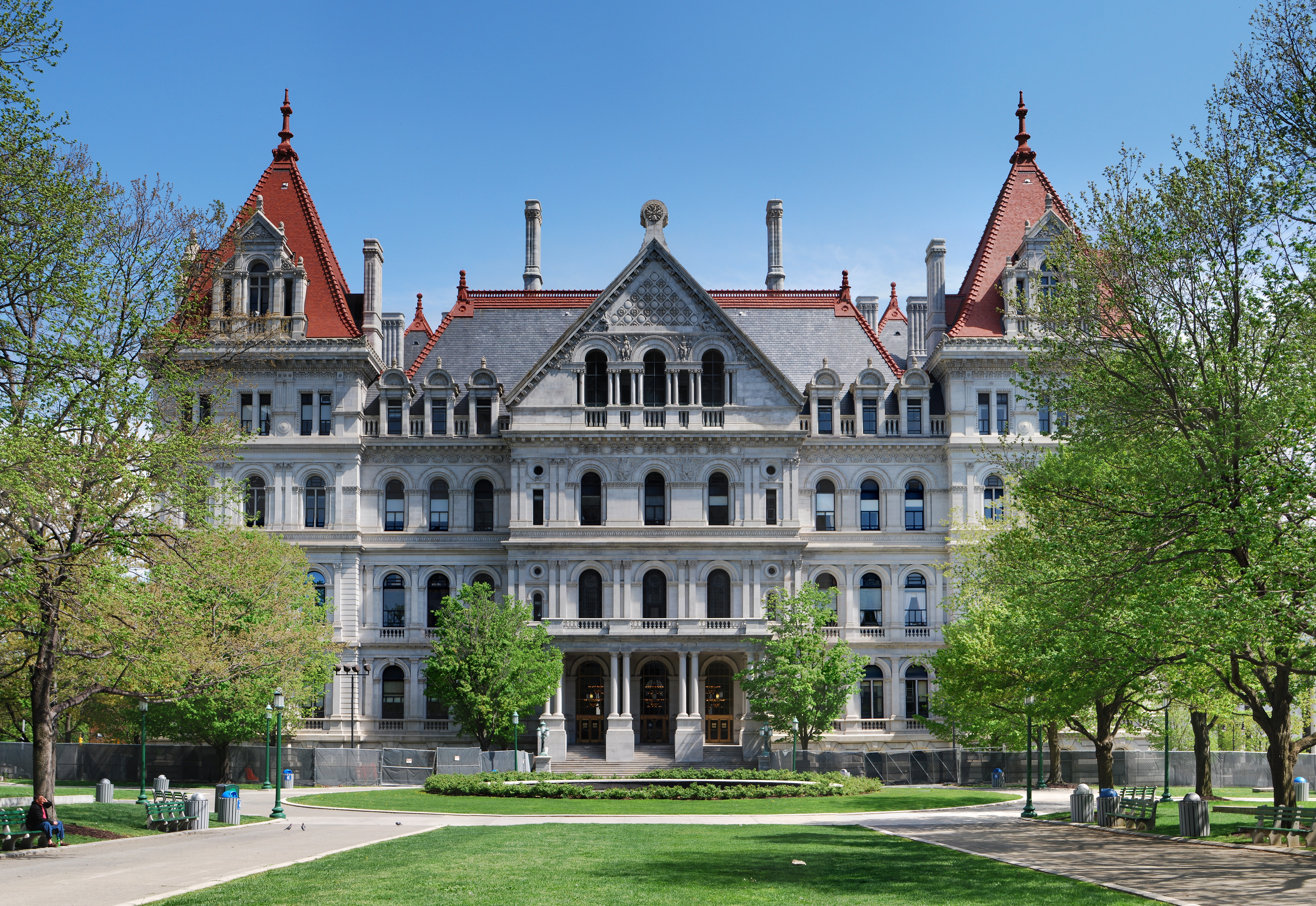
The Capitol viewed from the west

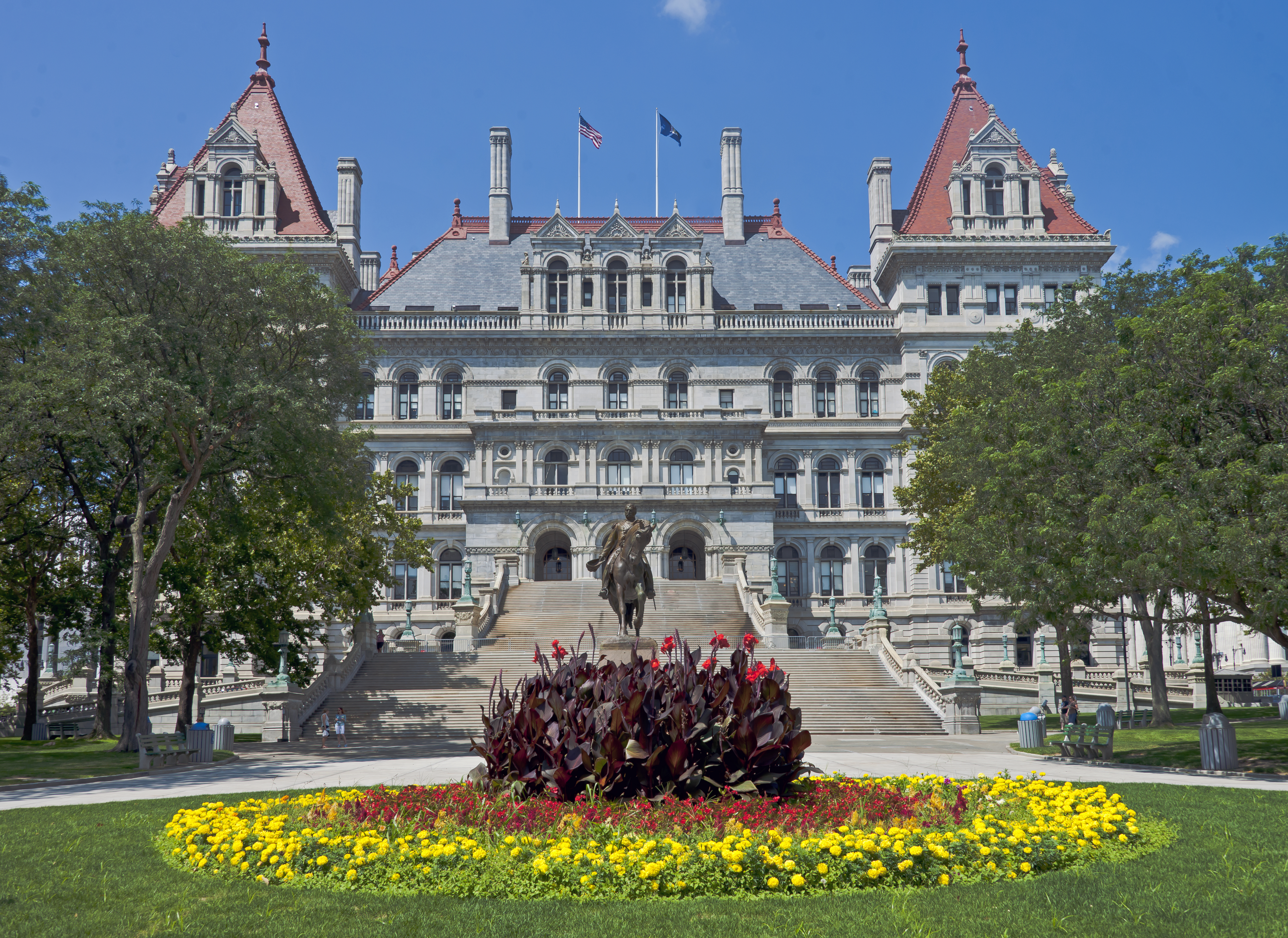
View of the Main (east) facade

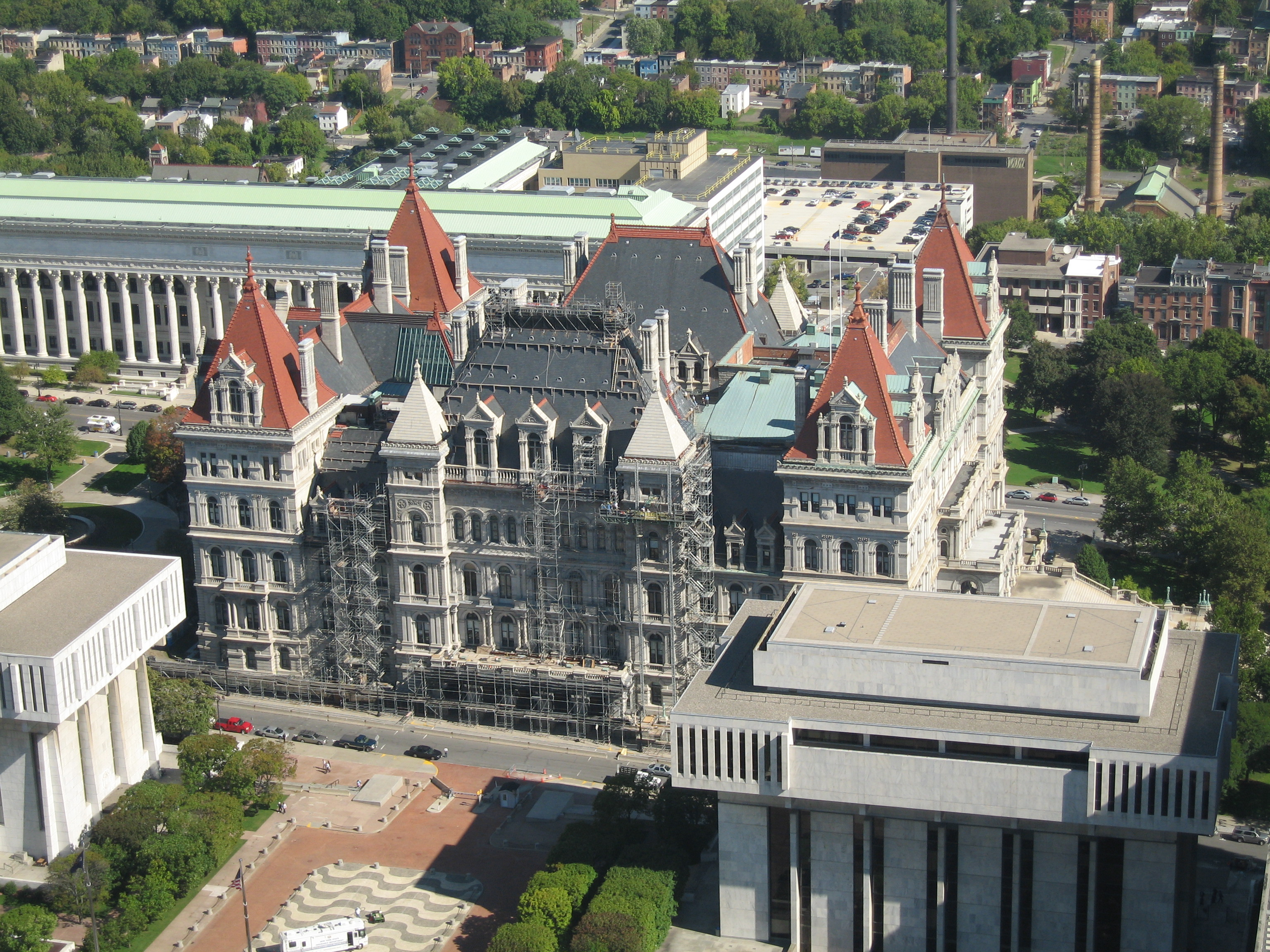
The Capitol viewed from the Corning Tower

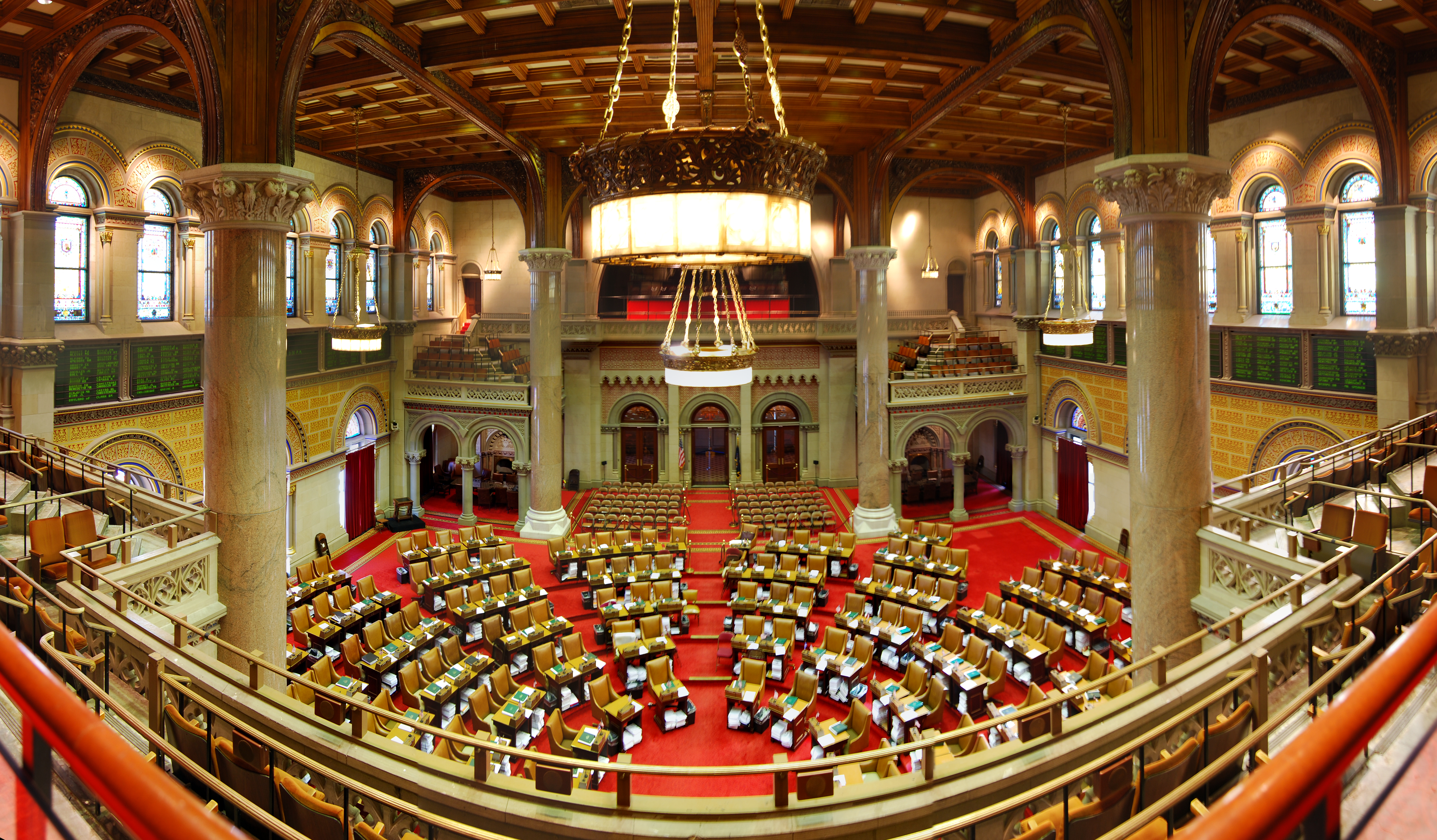
Panorama of the New York State Assembly Chamber

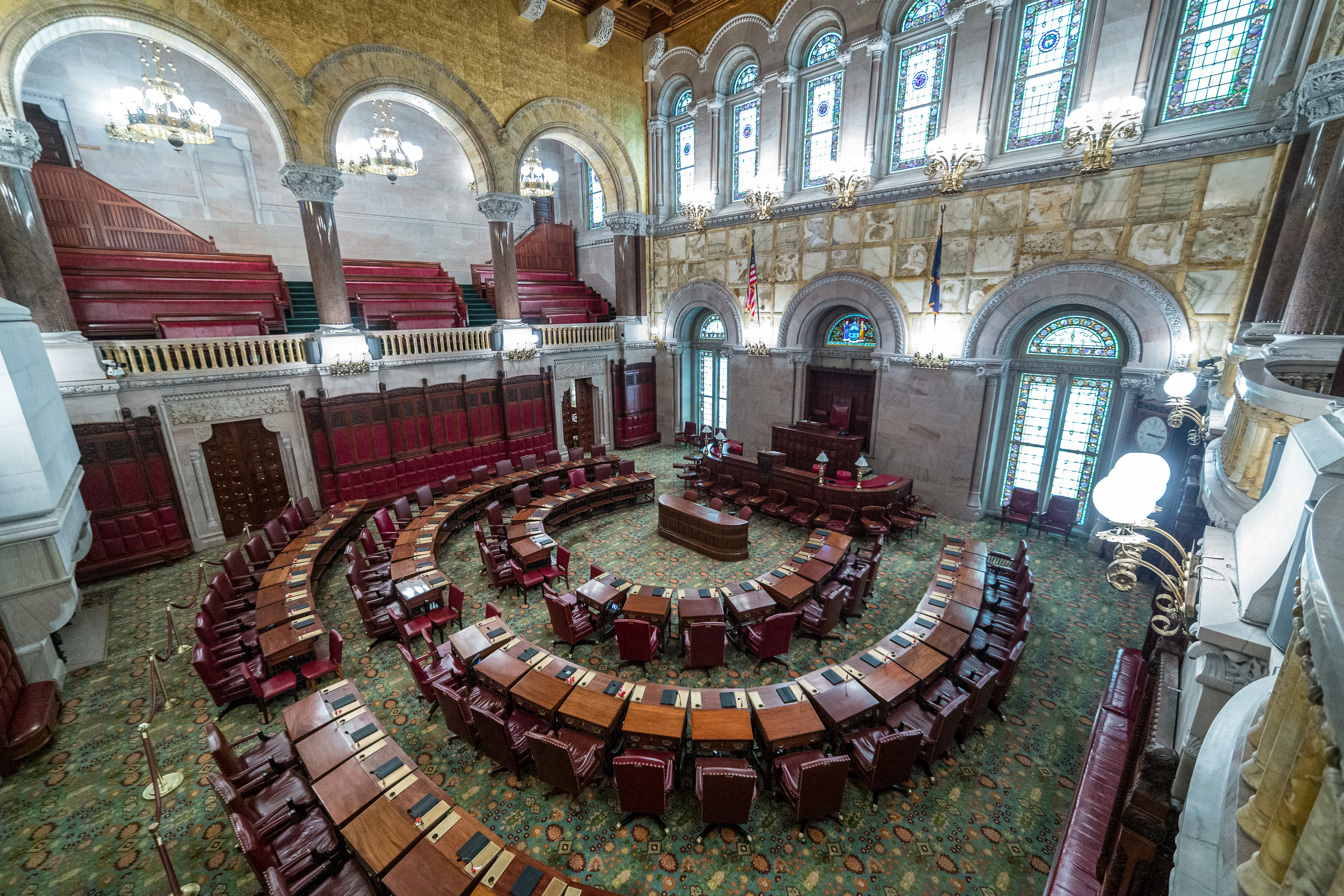
Panorama of the New York State Senate Chamber

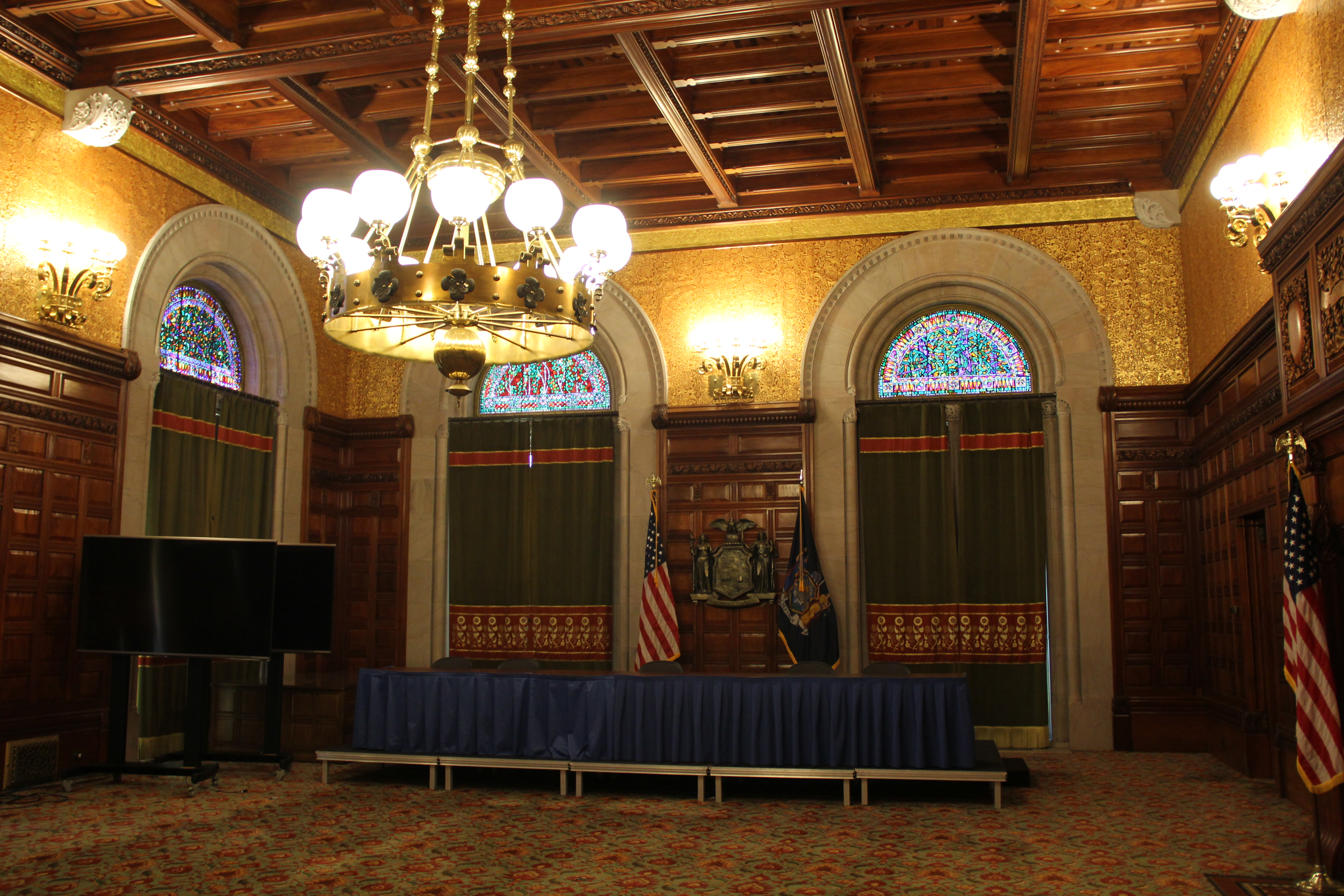
The Governor's Executive Chamber

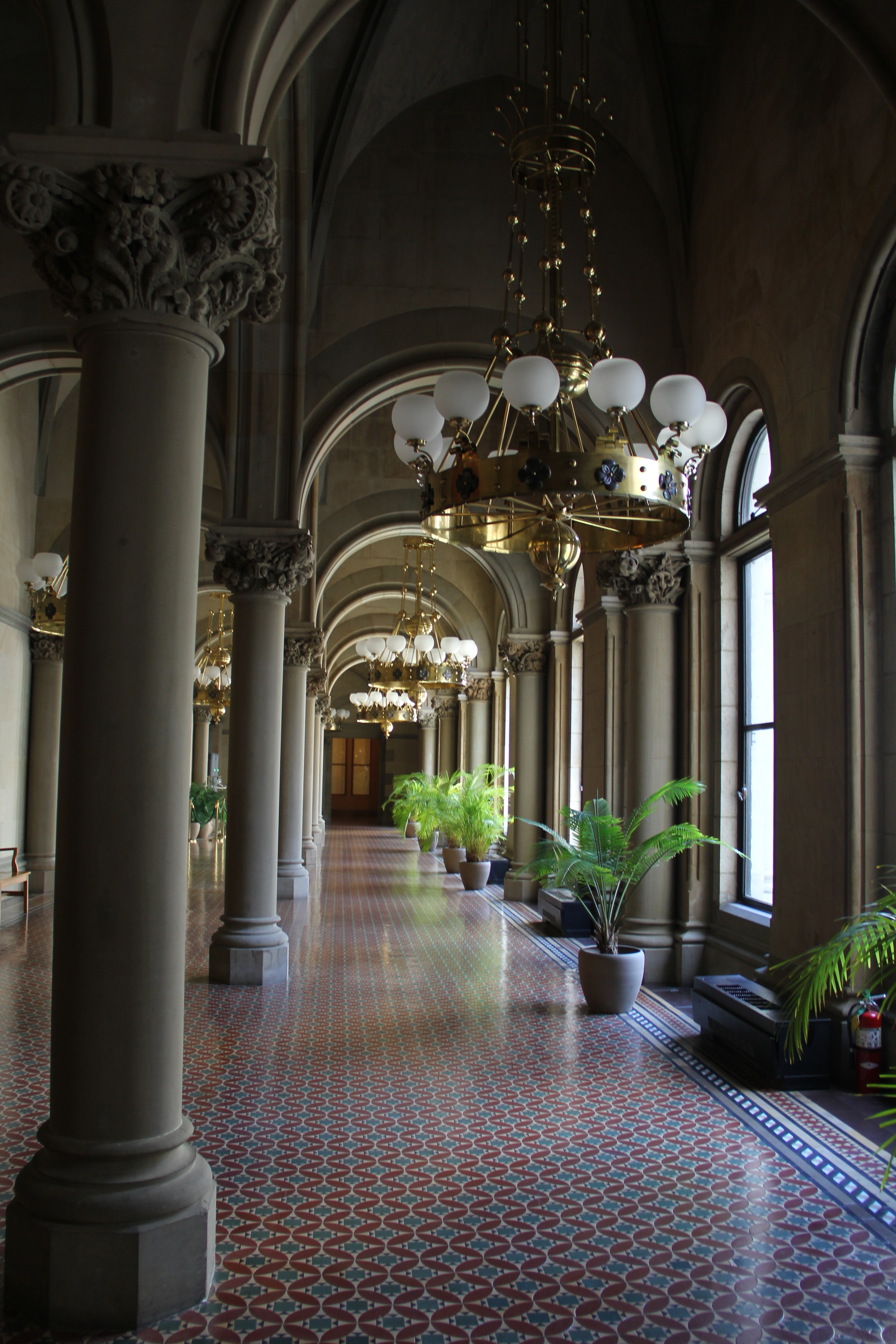
Outside the New York State Senate viewing gallery

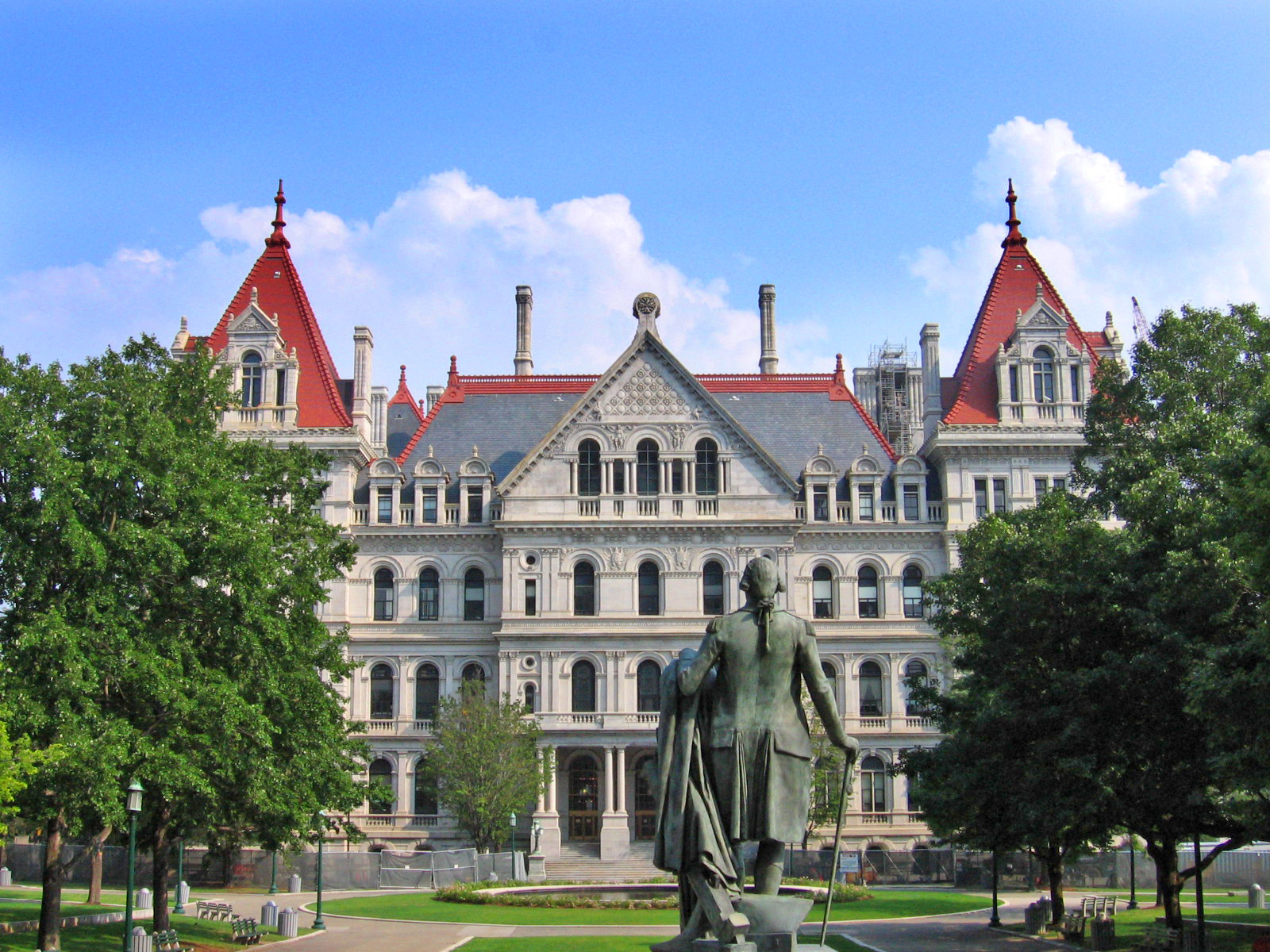
A statue of George Washington northwest of the capitol

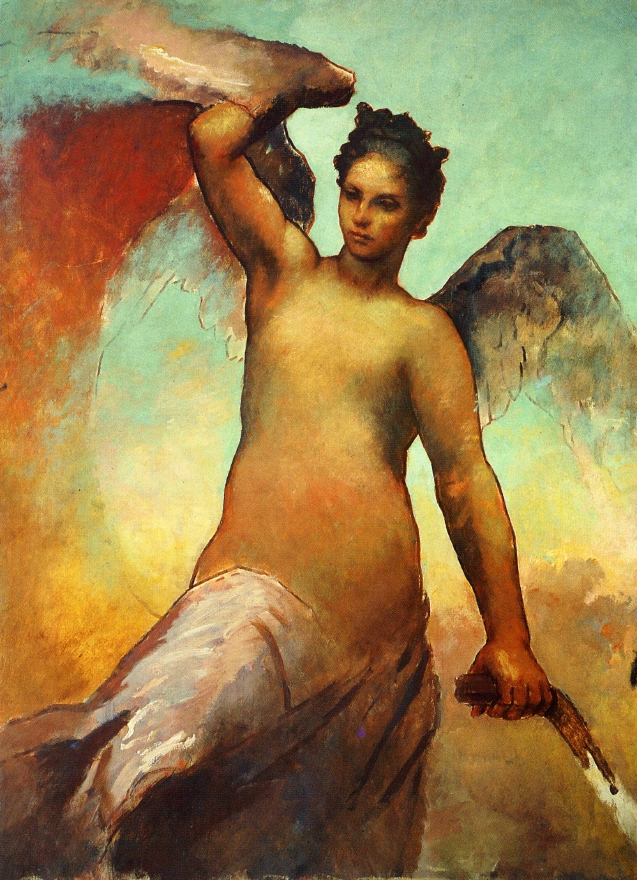
Study for Fortune, a figure in the now-obscured William Morris Hunt murals

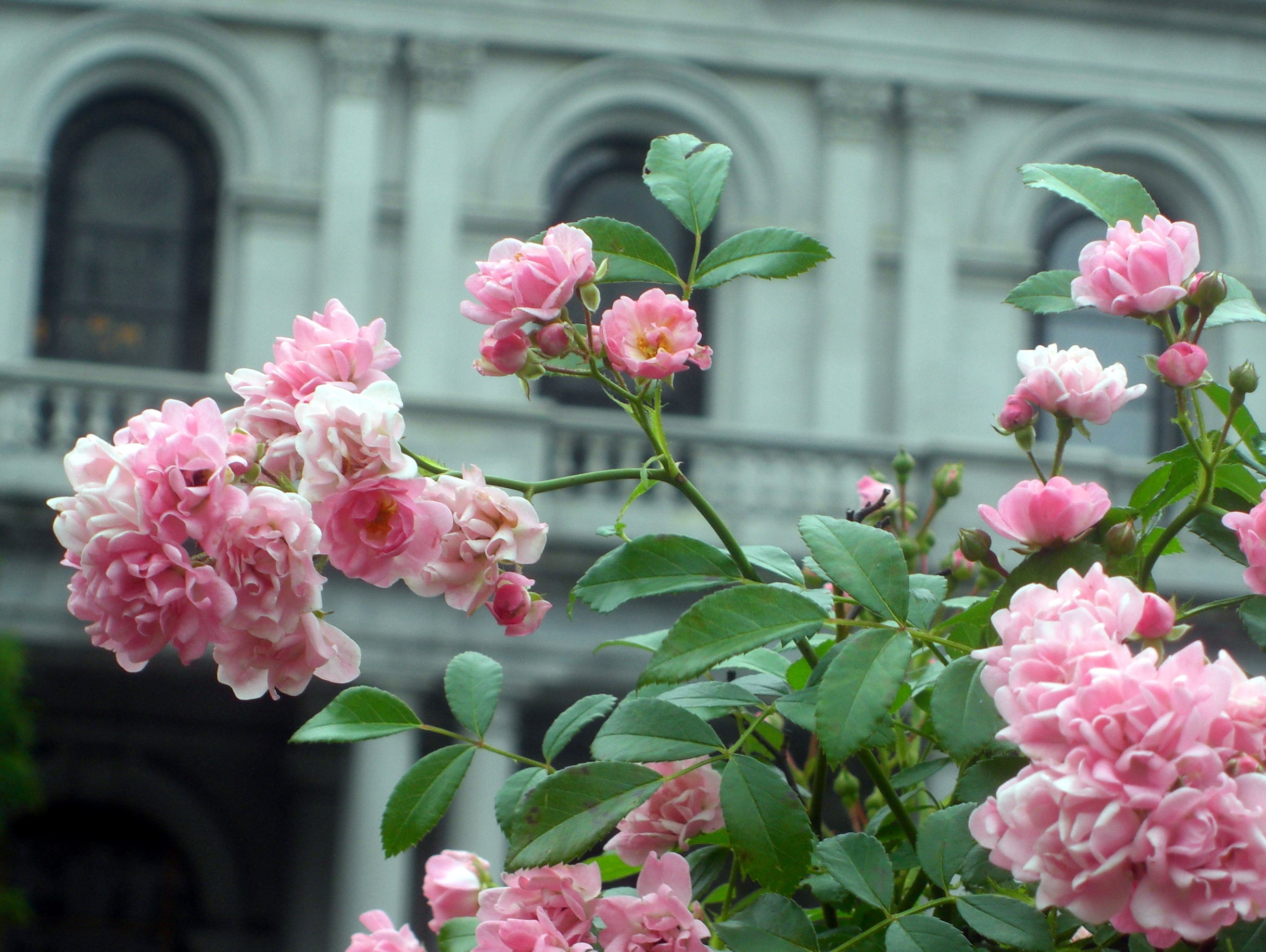
Flowers outside the capitol building

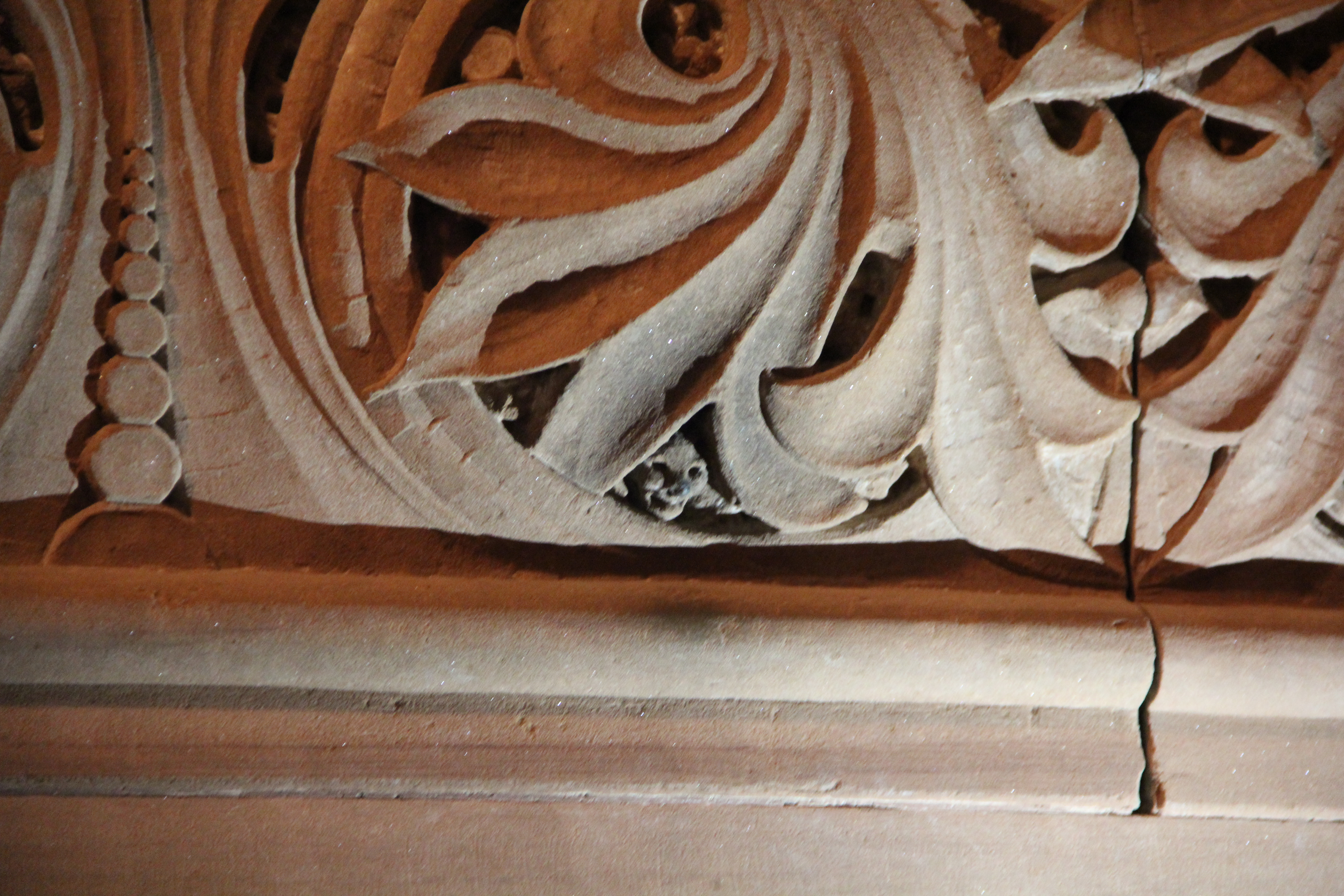
The NYS Capitol "Demon"

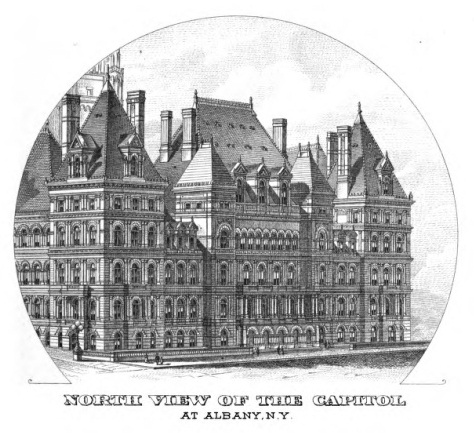
The Capitol in 1879

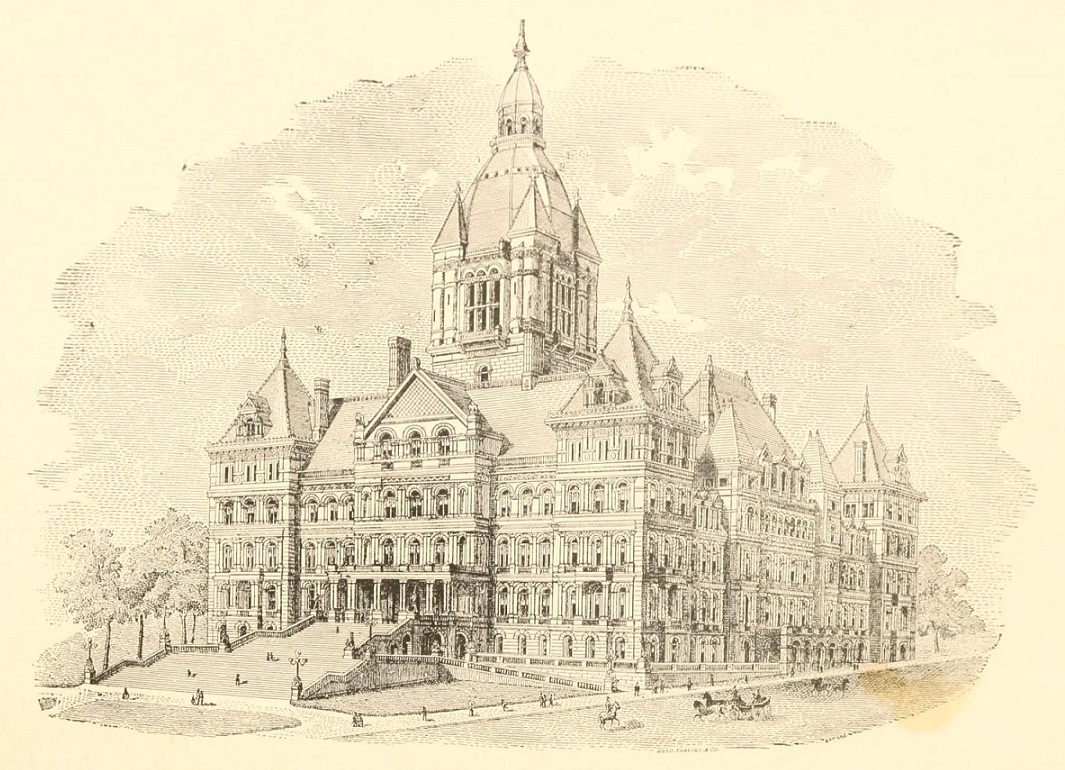
A rendering of the 1892 plan of the Capitol

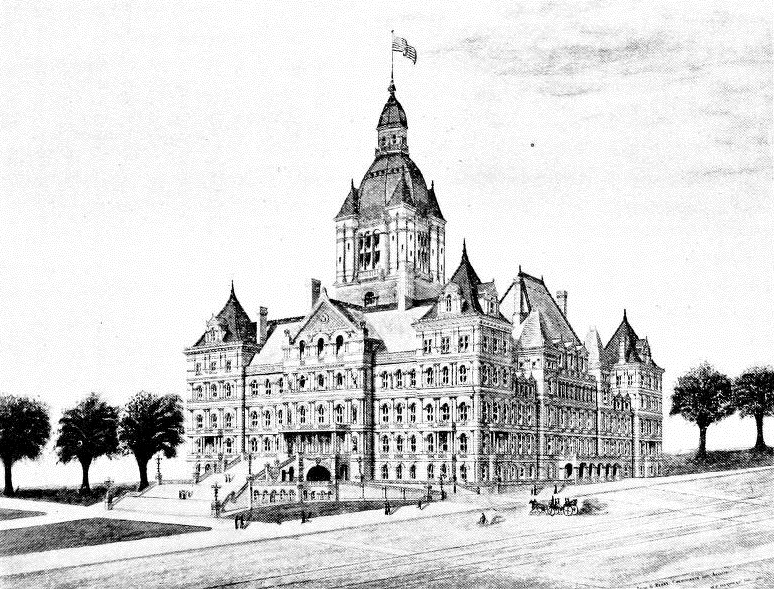
A rendering of the 1893 plan for the Capitol

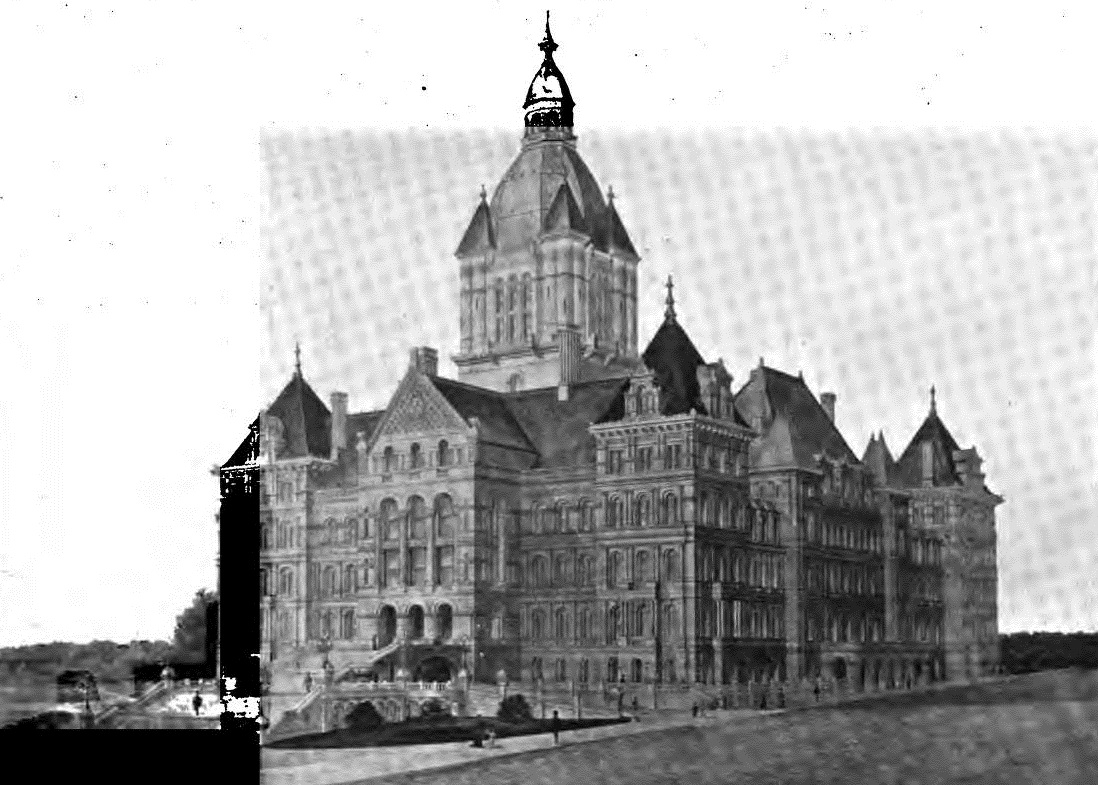
A rendering showing 1897 plan changes

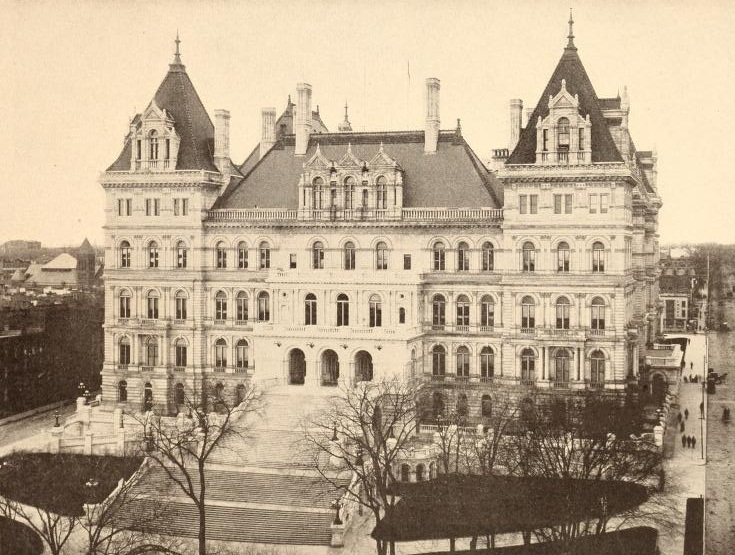
The Capitol in 1900

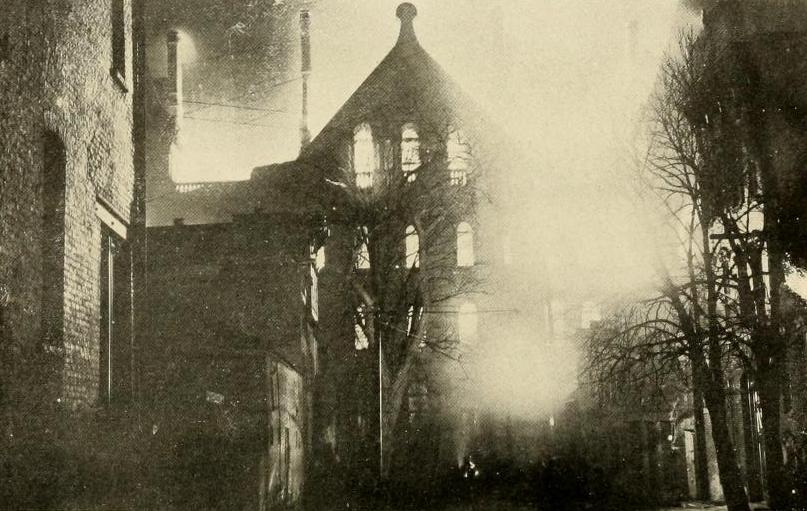
The Capitol on fire in 1911

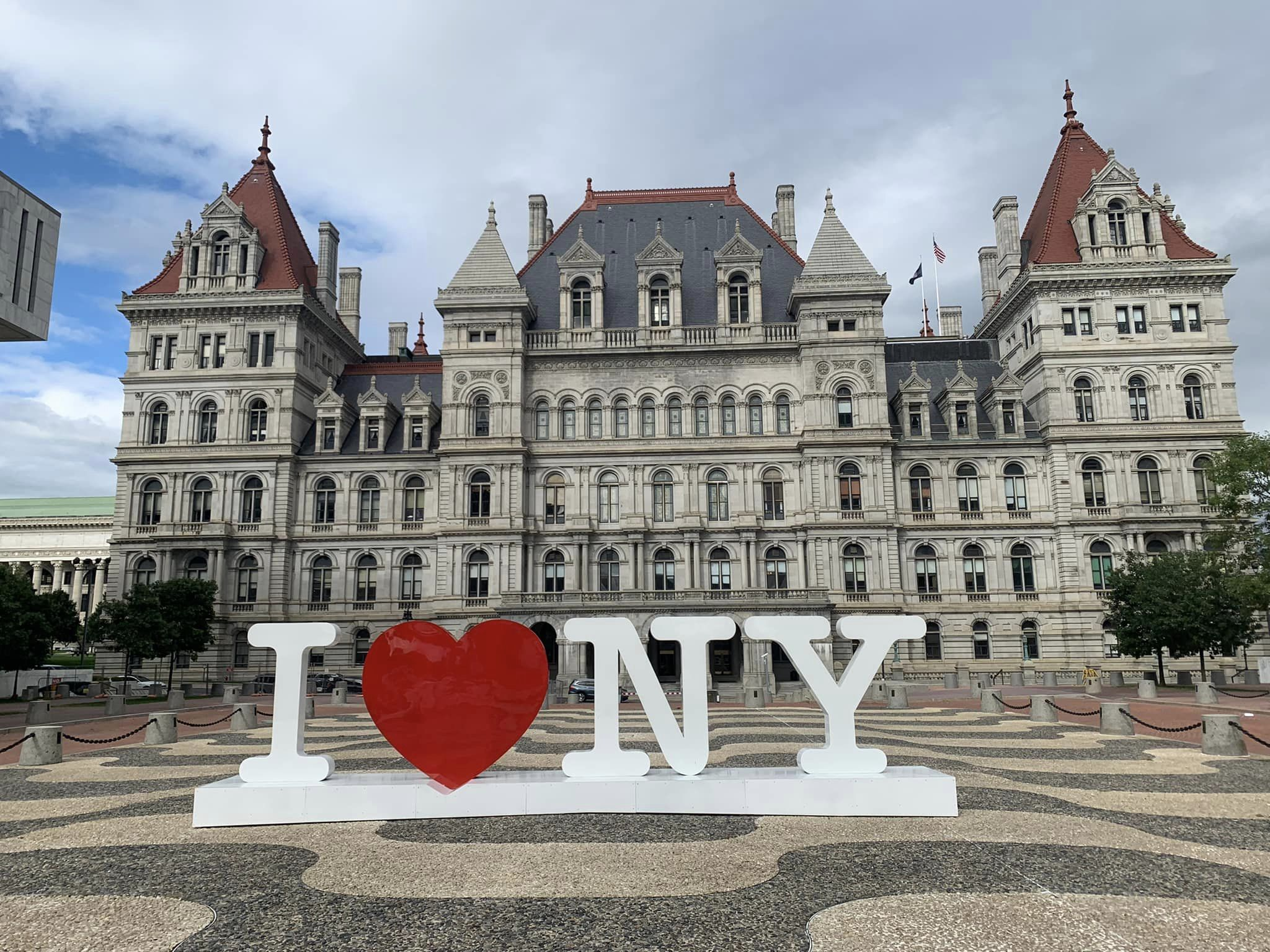
View of the exterior, September 2022

== See also ==
- List of New York State legislatures
- List of National Historic Landmarks in New York
- List of tallest buildings in Albany, New York
- National Register of Historic Places listings in Albany, New York
- List of state and territorial capitols in the United States
