= Erastus Corning Tower =

Skyscraper in Albany, New York

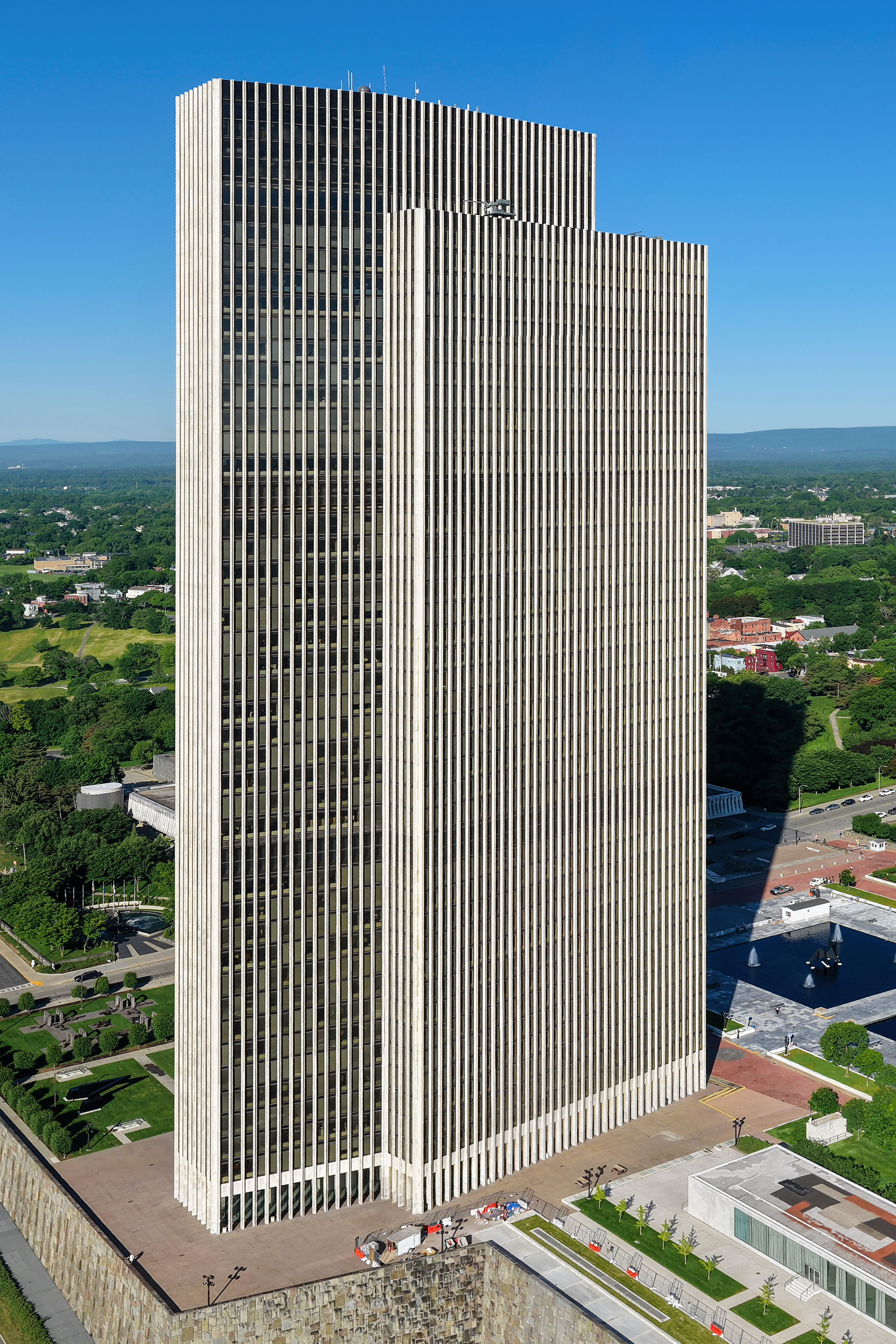
- A view of the Corning Tower from the north

General information
- Type: Offices
- Location: Albany, New York, United States
- Coordinates: 42.648997°N 73.759836°W
- Completed: 1973

Height
- Roof: 589 ft (180 m)

Technical details
- Floor count: 42

Design and construction
- Architects: Wallace Harrison and Max Abramovitz

Website
- empirestateplaza.ny.gov/corning-tower-observation-deck

The Erastus Corning Tower, also known as the Mayor Erastus Corning 2nd Tower or simply the Corning Tower, is a skyscraper located in downtown Albany, New York. Completed in 1973 and sided with Vermont Pearl marble and glass, the state office building is part of the Empire State Plaza. At 589 feet (180 m) and 44 stories in height, it is the tallest skyscraper in the state of New York outside of New York City. Erastus Corning 2nd, the building's namesake, was the mayor of Albany for over 40 years from 1941 to 1983. The tower was dedicated to him in March 1983 during his hospitalization. Before that dedication, it was known as the "Tower Building".

The Corning Tower houses the New York State Department of Health and the New York State Office of General Services. Two New York State Department of Transportation traffic cameras are located on the building to monitor nearby traffic conditions. From 2000 to 2004, it was the tallest structure in the World Almanac's list of "Other Tall Buildings in North American Cities".

== Observation deck ==
An observation deck is located on the Corning Tower's 42nd floor. It offers expansive views of Albany, the Hudson River, and the surrounding area. Panels below the windows give information about the visible landmarks. The observation deck, however, does not feature a 360-degree view because it has no windows on the west side. A nonstop elevator to the 42nd floor reaches a speed of 26 km/h (16 MPH). The deck is open to the public for free Monday through Friday from 10:00 a.m. to 4:00 p.m. Visitors can access the observation deck via the plaza or concourse levels. Upon taking office in 2010, Governor Andrew Cuomo eliminated a photo ID requirement.

== Gallery ==
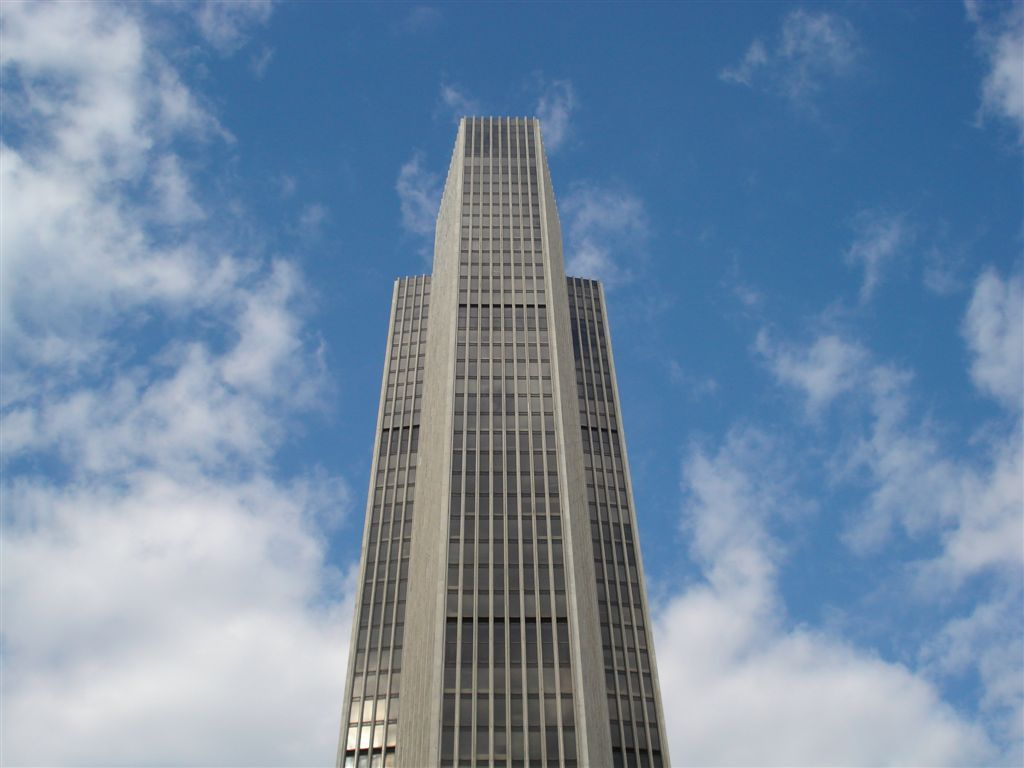
The Corning Tower viewed from Eagle Street.

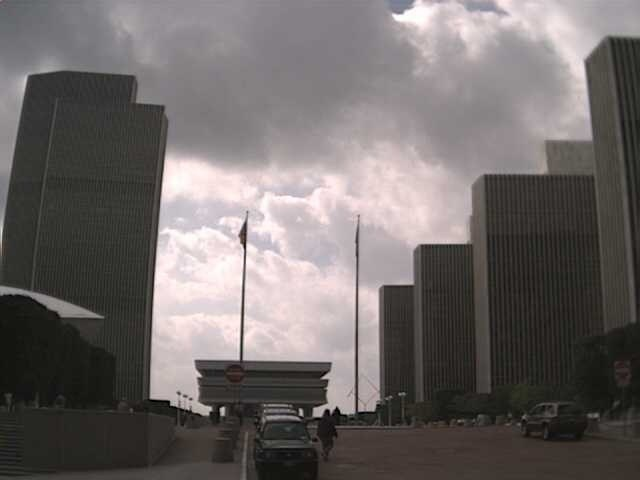
The Empire State Plaza, with the Corning Tower on the left.

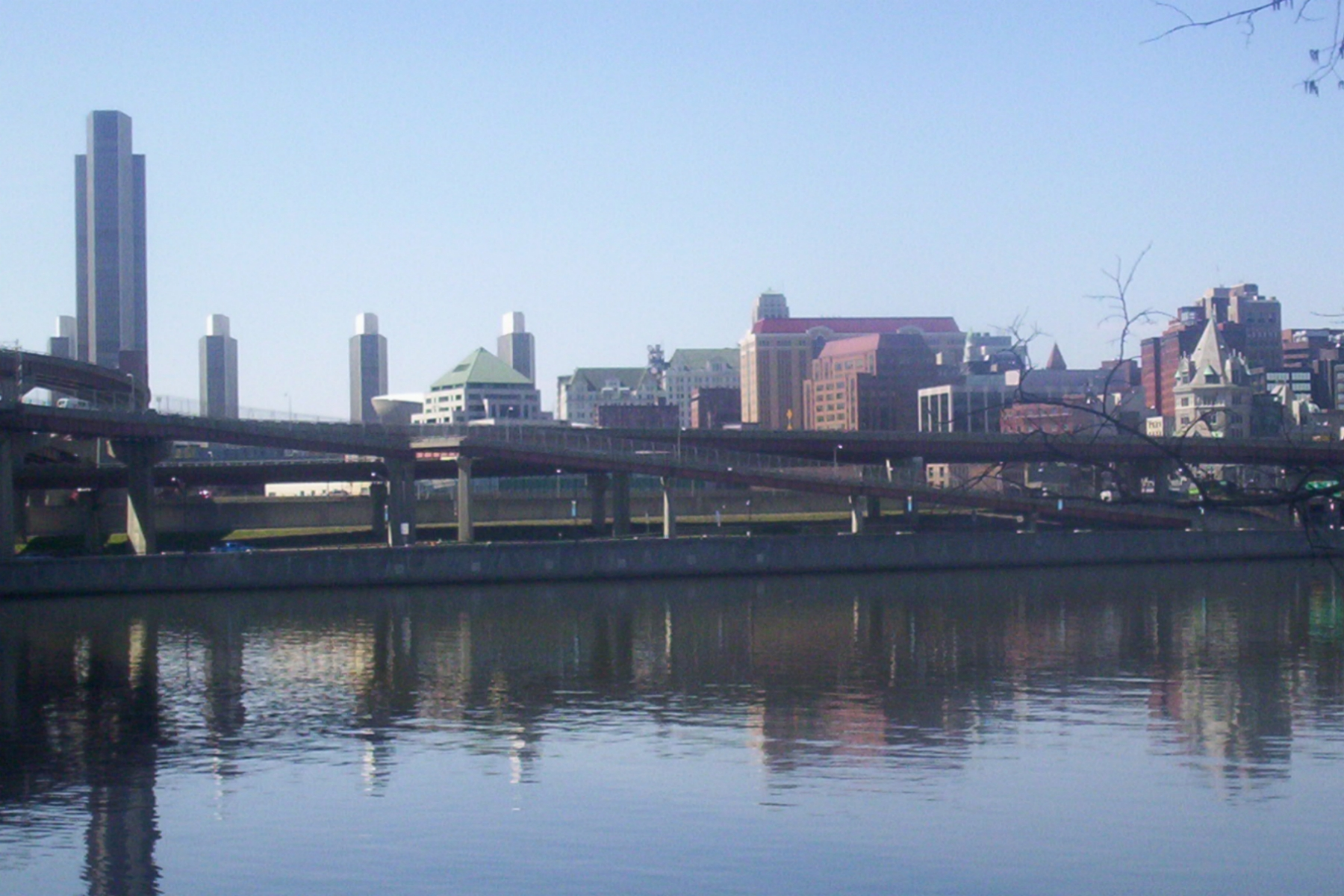
The Albany skyline. The Corning Tower is on the far left.

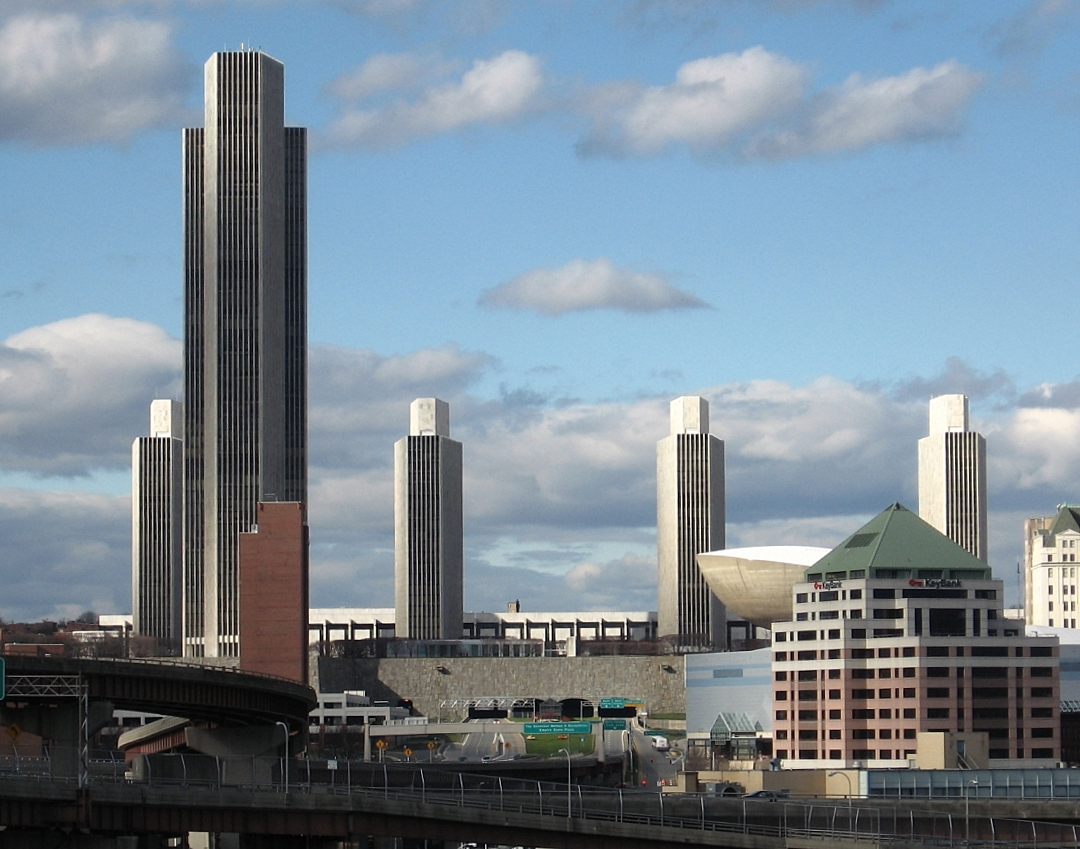

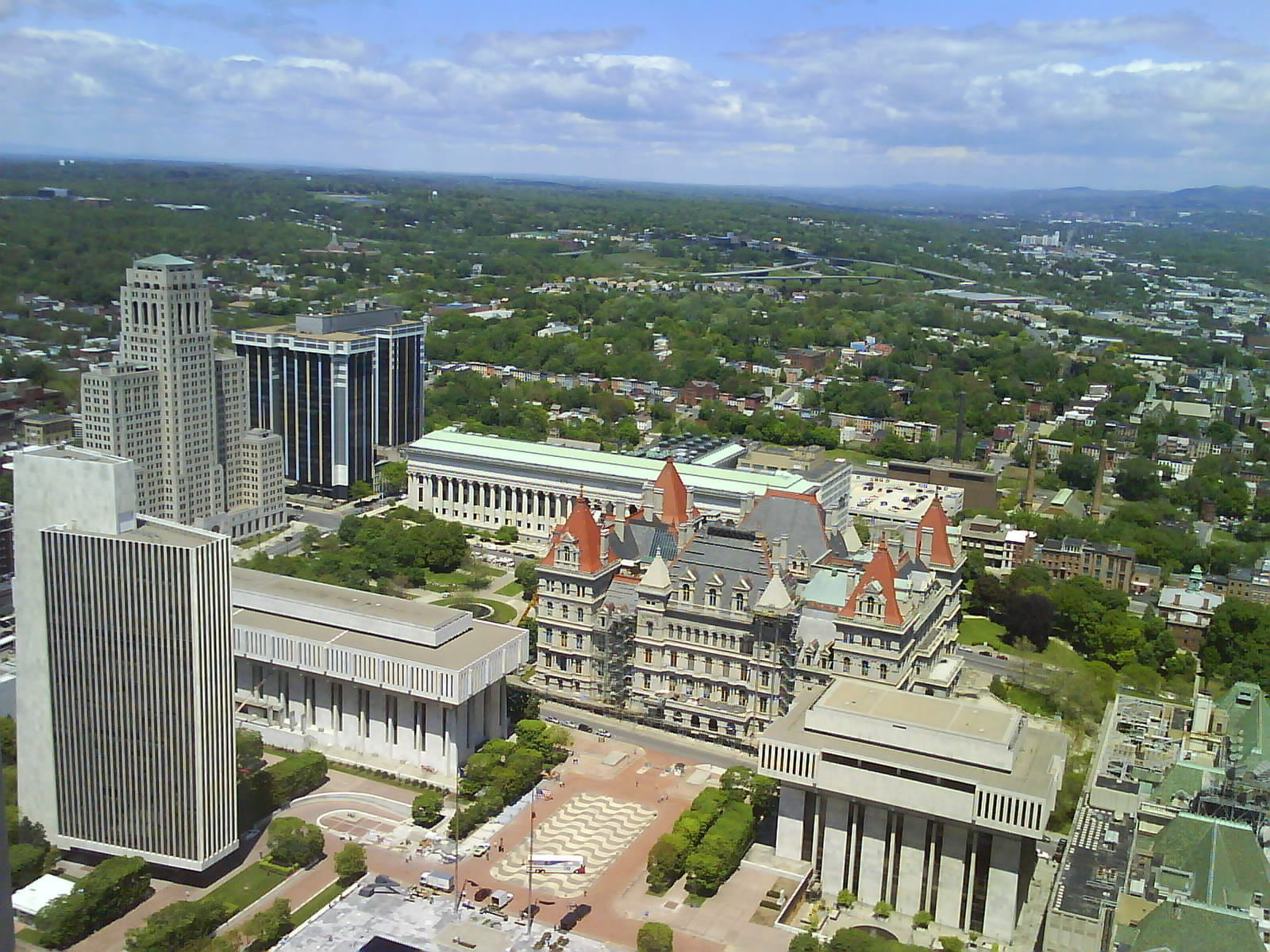
A view from the 42nd floor observation deck.

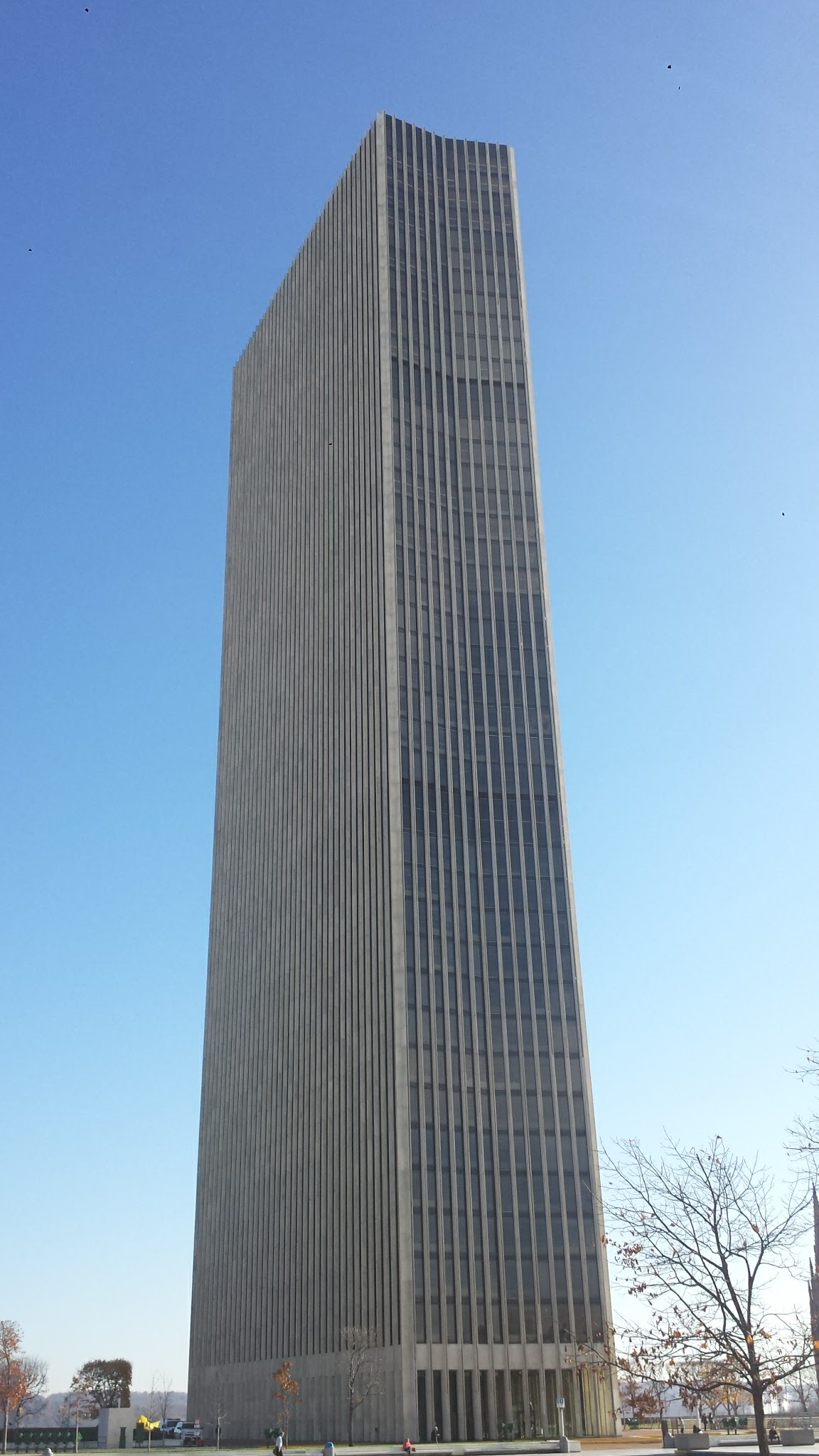
Erastus Corning Tower as seen from Empire State Plaza.

== Nearby attractions ==
- Empire State Plaza
- New York State Capitol Building
- New York State Museum
- The Egg
- Cathedral of the Immaculate Conception

== See also ==
- List of tallest buildings in Albany, New York
- List of tallest buildings in Upstate New York
