= One Commerce Plaza =

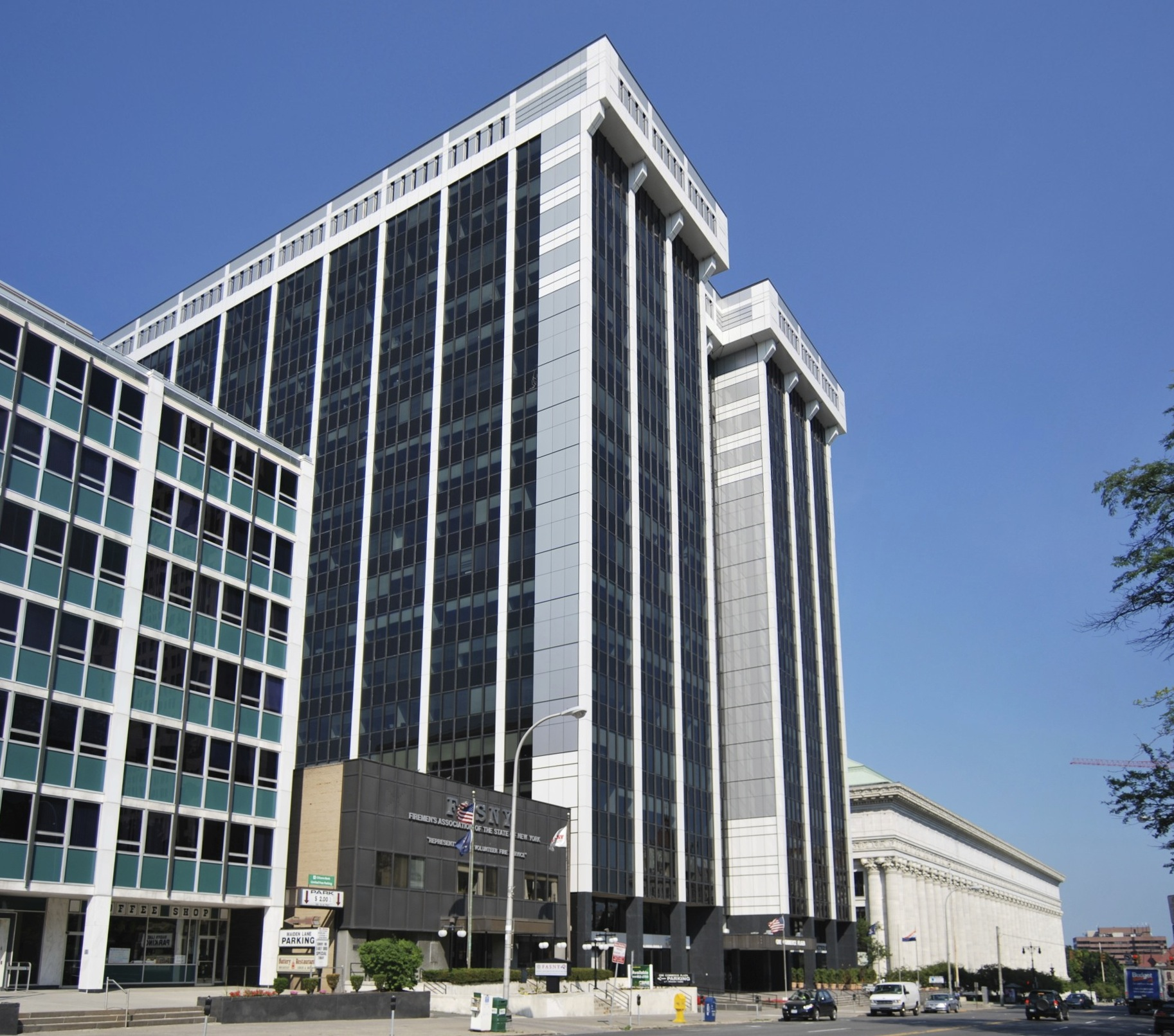
- One Commerce Plaza, 2010
- Interactive map of the One Commerce Plaza area
- Alternative names: Twin Towers

General information
- Status: Completed
- Type: Office
- Architectural style: Modernism
- Location: 99 Washington Avenue Albany, New York 12210, Albany, New York, United States
- Coordinates: 42°39′18″N 73°45′33″W
- Construction started: 1970
- Completed: 1971
- Renovated: 2007

Height
- Height: 252 feet (76.8 m)

Technical details
- Floor count: 20

Design and construction
- Architect: Julius Tauss

One Commerce Plaza, also known as the Twin Towers, is an office building located at 99 Washington Avenue in downtown Albany, New York. At 20 floors and 252 feet (77 meters), it is the thirteenth tallest structure in Albany. Although it is a privately owned office tower, much of the building is occupied by New York State government offices. Its lobby features several restaurants.

One Commerce Plaza was completed in 1971 and was designed by Julius Tauss in the Modernist style. It originally had a black glass and white marble exterior. For a few years in the 2000s, the building was draped in white plastic sheathing. This preceded an exterior renovation, when the marble panels of the original facade were replaced with metal composite ones because the marble was too thick for exterior use.

On April 30, 2007, a chunk of marble fell off One Commerce Plaza, injuring three people. It was reported that high wind gusts were responsible for the chunk letting loose from the building, which was under renovation at the time.

== See also ==
- List of tallest buildings in Albany, New York
