= New York State Field Band Conference =

The New York State Field Band Conference (NYSFBC) is a local circuit for marching band competitions, based in the U.S. state of New York. Championships are held at the JMA Wireless Dome in Syracuse, New York each year in the last week of October or first week of November. The conference was created in February 1972 to standardize rules and provide constructive feedback at competitions.

== Mission ==
=== Purpose ===
The New York State Field Band Conference, Inc. was formed on Feb. 6, 1972 for the purpose of regulating and scheduling field band events in New York State, and for the enhancement of school field band competitions. It is the aim of the New York State Field Band Conference to encourage participation in such events.

=== Philosophy ===
It shall be the philosophy of the New York State Field Band Conference to encourage and provide the most positive experience possible for all participants. The Conference will address this need through procedures it implements regarding competition.

== History ==
Eleven bands participated in the first championship in 1974 which was held at MacArthur Stadium in Syracuse, New York. The conference has grown to over 50 bands in recent years and has seen participation from outside the state of New York with bands from Connecticut, New Jersey, and Pennsylvania.

The championship competition moved from various Syracuse area schools, as well as Cornell University in Ithaca, to the JMA Wireless Dome in 1980 and has been held in that venue ever since.

== Classifications ==
The NYSFBC has gone through two major methods of classification for the bands that participate in sponsored competitions. The current system of classes was created in 1999, with the exception of the National Class, which was created in 1989.

This system consists of 2 major classifications with smaller classes within each of the two major classes.

Classification	
Small School	<4000 Students K-12
Large School	>4000 Students K-12

== Past champions ==
=== Classification system (1974–1981) ===
Year	—	B	A	—
1974 (1st)		Canandaigua Academy; Canandaigua, NY	West Genesee HS; Camillus, NY	
1975 (2nd)		Holley Central (Holley, NY)	West Genesee HS ^{(2)} Camillus, NY	
Year		B	A	AA
1976 (3rd)		Haverling HS (Bath, NY)	Holley Central (Holley, NY)	West Genesee HS; Camillus, NY
1977 (4th)		Jordan-Elbridge HS; Jordan, NY	Canandaigua Academy; Canandaigua, NY	West Genesee HS ^{(2)} Camillus, NY
Year	Novice	B	A	AA
1978 (5th)	Le Roy Jr/Sr HS (Le Roy, NY)	Haverling HS ^{(2)} (Bath, NY)	Canandaigua Academy ^{(2)} Canandaigua, NY	Cicero HS; Cicero, NY
1979 (6th)	Cassadaga Valley HS (Sinclairville, NY)	Marcus Whitman HS (Rushville, NY)	East Syracuse-Minoa HS (East Syracuse, NY)	West Genesee HS ^{(3)} Camillus, NY
1980 (7th)	Academy HS (Erie, PA)	Jordan-Elbridge HS ^{(2)} Jordan, NY	East Syracuse-Minoa HS^{(2)} (East Syracuse, NY)	West Genesee HS ^{(4)} Camillus, NY
1981 (8th)	Mohawk HS (Mohawk, NY)	Jordan-Elbridge HS ^{(3)} Jordan, NY	Marcus Whitman HS ^{(2)} (Rushville, NY)	West Genesee HS ^{(5)} Camillus, NY

=== Classification system (1982–1988) ===
Year	Novice	A	A Open	AA	AA Open	Open
1982 (9th)	Keystone Jr/Sr HS (Knox, PA)	Medina HS (Medina, NY)		New Hartford HS (New Hartford, NY)		West Genesee HS; Camillus, NY
1983 (10th)	Horseheads HS (Horseheads, NY)	Montrose Area Jr/Sr HS (Montrose, PA)		Jordan-Elbridge HS; Jordan, NY		West Genesee HS ^{(2)} Camillus, NY
1984 (11th)	Aquinas Institute (Rochester, NY)	Gloversville HS (Gloverville, NY)		Canandaigua Academy; Canandaigua, NY		West Genesee HS ^{(3)} Camillus, NY
1985 (12th)	Phoenix HS (Phoenix, NY)	Eastridge HS (Rochester, NY)	Jordan-Elbridge HS; Jordan, NY	Bishop Kearney HS (Rochester, NY)	Liverpool HS (Liverpool, NY)	
1986 (13th)	Falconer HS (Falconer, NY)	Mohawk HS (Mohawk, NY)	Jordan-Elbridge HS ^{(2)} Jordan, NY	Baldwinsville HS (Baldwinsville, NY)	West Genesee HS; Camillus, NY	
1987 (14th)	Orchard Park HS (Orchard Park, NY)	Bishop Kearney HS (Rochester, NY)	Jordan-Elbridge HS ^{(3)} Jordan, NY	Central Square HS (Central Square, NY)	Cicero-North Syracuse HS (Cicero, NY)	
1988 (15th)	No Champion	Southwestern HS (Jamestown, NY)	Jordan-Elbridge HS ^{(3)} Jordan, NY	Union-Endicott HS (Endicott, NY)	Liverpool HS (Liverpool, NY)	

=== Classification system (1989–1998) ===
Year	A	A-2	AA	AAA	AAAA	National
1989 (16th)	Victor HS (Victor, NY)		Medina HS (Medina, NY)	Webster (Webster, NY)		West Genesee HS; Camillus, NY
1990 (17th)	Victor HS ^{(2)} (Victor, NY)		New Hartford HS ^{(2)} (New Hartford, NY)	Webster ^{(2)} (Webster, NY)		West Genesee HS ^{(2)} Camillus, NY
1991 (18th)	East Syracuse-Minoa HS ^{(3)} (East Syracuse, NY)		New Hartford HS ^{(3)} (New Hartford, NY)	Jamestown HS (Jamestown, NY)		West Genesee HS ^{(3)} Camillus, NY
1992 (19th)	East Syracuse-Minoa HS ^{(4)} (East Syracuse, NY) Tie Jordan-Elbridge HS (Jordan, NY)	Mahopac HS (Mahopac, NY)	Eastridge HS (Rochester, NY)	Horseheads HS (Horseheads, NY)		West Genesee HS ^{(4)} Camillus, NY
1993 (20th)	Orchard Park HS (Orchard Park, NY)		East Syracuse-Minoa HS (East Syracuse, NY)	Eastridge HS (Rochester, NY)		West Genesee HS ^{(5)} Camillus, NY
1994 (21st)	Phoenix HS (Phoenix, NY)		Baldwinsville HS (Baldwinsville, NY)	Eastridge HS (Rochester, NY)		West Genesee HS ^{(6)} Camillus, NY
1995 (22nd)	Southwestern HS ^{(2)} (Jamestown, NY)		Jordan-Elbridge HS (Jordan, NY)	Medina HS (Medina, NY)		West Genesee HS ^{(7)} Camillus, NY
1996 (23rd)	Greater Johnstown HS (Johnstown, NY)		Copiague HS (Copiague, NY)	Jordan-Elbridge HS (Jordan, NY)	New Hartford HS ^{(3)} (New Hartford, NY)	West Genesee HS ^{(8)} Camillus, NY
1997 (24th)	Marcus Whitman HS (Rushville, NY)		Central Square HS ^{(2)} (Central Square, NY) tie Sachem Central (Lake Ronkonkoma, NY)	Orchard Park HS (Orchard Park, NY)	Medina HS (Medina, NY)	West Genesee HS ^{(9)} Camillus, NY; Tie; Norwalk HS (Norwalk, CT)
1998 (25th)	Marcus Whitman HS ^{(2)} (Rushville, NY)		Phoenix HS (Phoenix, NY)	Jordan-Elbridge HS ^{(2)} (Jordan, NY)	Eastridge HS (Rochester, NY)	West Genesee HS ^{(10)} Camillus, NY

=== Current classification system (1999–present) ===
Year	Small School 3	Small School 2	Large School 3	Large School 2	Small School 1	National
1999 (26th)	Northwestern HS (Albion, PA)	Phoenix HS (Phoenix, NY)	Sachem Central (Lake Ronkonkoma, NY)	Horseheads HS (Horseheads, NY)	Eastridge HS (Rochester, NY)	West Genesee HS ^{(11)} Camillus, NY
2000 (27th)	Northwestern HS^{(2)} (Albion, PA)	Victor HS (Victor, NY)	Baldwinsville HS (Baldwinsville, NY)	Orchard Park HS (Orchard Park, NY)	Medina HS (Medina, NY)	West Genesee HS ^{(12)} Camillus, NY
2001 (28th)	Falconer HS (Falconer, NY)	Victor HS^{(2)} (Victor, NY)	Baldwinsville HS ^{(2)} (Baldwinsville, NY)	Orchard Park HS ^{(2)} (Orchard Park, NY)	Medina HS ^{(2)} (Medina, NY)	West Genesee HS ^{(13)} Camillus, NY
2002 (29th)	Falconer HS ^{(2)} (Falconer, NY)	Norwich HS (Norwich, NY)	Copiague HS (Copiague, NY)	Jamestown HS (Jamestown, NY)	Medina HS ^{(3)} (Medina, NY)	West Genesee HS ^{(14)} Camillus, NY
2003 (30th)	Marcus Whitman HS (Rushville, NY)	Norwich HS ^{(2)} (Norwich, NY)	Copiague HS ^{(2)} (Copiague, NY)	Horseheads HS^{(2)} (Horseheads, NY)	New Hartford HS (New Hartford, NY)	West Genesee HS ^{(15)} Camillus, NY
2004 (31st)	Le Roy Jr/Sr HS (Le Roy, NY)	Phoenix HS ^{(2)} (Phoenix, NY)	Huntington HS (Huntington, NY)	Baldwinsville HS (Baldwinsville, NY)	Norwich HS (Norwich, NY)	Arlington HS (LaGrangeville, NY)
2005 (32nd)	Le Roy Jr/Sr HS ^{(2)} (Le Roy, NY)	Northwestern HS (Albion, PA)	Sachem Central ^{(2)} (Lake Rokonkoma, NY)	Copiague HS (Copiague, NY)	Medina HS ^{(4)} (Medina, NY)	Norwalk HS ^{(2)} (Norwalk, CT)
2006 (33rd)	Melverne HS (Melverne, NY)	Northwestern HS^{(2)} (Albion, PA)	Brentwood HS (Brentwood, NY)	Copiague HS ^{(2)} (Copiague, NY)	Victor HS (Victor, NY)	West Genesee HS ^{(16)} (Camillus, NY)
2007 (34th)	Johnson City HS (Johnson City, NY)	Northwestern HS^{(3)} (Albion, PA)	Brentwood HS ^{(2)} (Brentwood, NY)	Central Square HS (Central Square, NY)	New Hartford HS ^{(2)} (New Hartford, NY)	Orchard Park HS (Orchard Park, NY)
2008 (35th)	Wellsville HS (Wellsville, NY)	Le Roy Jr/Sr HS (Le Roy, NY); Tie; Mohonasen HS (Schenectady, NY)	Sachem Central ^{(3)} (Lake Rokonkoma, NY)	Central Square HS ^{(2)} (Central Square, NY)	Medina HS ^{(5)} (Medina, NY)	West Genesee HS ^{(17)} (Camillus, NY)
2009 (36th)	Johnson City HS^{(2)} (Johnson City, NY)	Mineola HS (Garden City Park, NY)	West Seneca West HS (West Seneca, NY)	Baldwinsville HS ^{(2)} (Baldwinsville, NY)	Medina HS ^{(6)} (Medina, NY)	West Genesee HS ^{(18)} (Camillus, NY)
2010 (37th)	Melverne HS^{(2)} (Melverne, NY)	Mohonasen HS ^{(2)} (Schenectady, NY)	West Seneca HS ^{(2)} (West Seneca, NY)	Brentwood HS (Brentwood, NY)	Medina HS ^{(7)} (Medina, NY)	Victor HS (Victor, NY)
2011 (38th)	Westmoreland HS (Westmoreland, NY)	Melverne HS (Melverne, NY)	West Seneca HS ^{(3)} (West Seneca, NY)	Lancaster HS (Lancaster, NY)	Medina HS ^{(8)} (Medina, NY)	West Genesee HS ^{(19)} (Camillus, NY)
2012 (39th)	Westmoreland HS ^{(2)} (Westmoreland, NY); Tie; Marcus Whitman HS ^{(2)} (Rushville, NY)	Jordan-Elbridge HS (Jordan, NY)	Kingston HS (Kingston, NY)	Baldwinsville HS ^{(3)} (Baldwinsville, NY)	Medina HS ^{(9)} (Medina, NY)	West Genesee HS ^{(20)} (Camillus, NY)
2013 (40th)	Westmoreland HS ^{(3)} (Westmoreland, NY)	Corning East HS (Note: [a] Merged with Corning High School West in 2014 to become Corning-Painted Post HS) (Corning, NY)	West Seneca HS ^{(4)} (West Seneca, NY)	Lancaster HS ^{(2)} (Lancaster, NY)	Medina HS ^{(10)} (Medina, NY)	West Genesee HS ^{(21)} (Camillus, NY)
2014 (41st)	Union-Endicott HS (Endicott, NY)	Phoenix HS ^{(3)} (Phoenix, NY)	Huntington HS ^{(2)} (Huntington, NY)	Jamestown HS ^{(2)} (Jamestown, NY)	New Hartford HS ^{(3)} (New Hartford, NY)	West Genesee HS ^{(22)} (Camillus, NY)
2015 (42nd)	Roslyn HS (Roslyn Heights, NY)	Central Square HS (Central Square, NY)	West Seneca HS ^{(5)} (West Seneca, NY)	Jamestown HS ^{(3)} (Jamestown, NY)	East Syracuse-Minoa HS (East Syracuse, NY)	Victor HS ^{(2)} (Victor, NY)
2016 (43rd)	Vestal HS (Vestal, NY)	Northwestern HS^{(4)} (Albion, PA)	West Seneca HS ^{(6)} (West Seneca, NY)	Cicero-North Syracuse HS (Cicero, NY)	New Hartford HS ^{(3)} (New Hartford, NY)	Arlington HS ^{(2)} (LaGrangeville, NY)
2017 (44th)	Roslyn HS ^{(2)} (Roslyn Heights, NY)	Phoenix HS ^{(3)} (Phoenix, NY)	Corning-Painted Post HS ^{(2)} (Corning, NY)	Cicero-North Syracuse HS ^{(2)} (Cicero, NY)	East Syracuse-Minoa HS ^{(2)} (East Syracuse, NY)	Arlington HS ^{(3)} (LaGrangeville, NY)
2018 (45th)	Jordan-Elbridge HS (Jordan, NY)	Mineola HS ^{(2)} (Garden City Park, NY)	Sachem Central ^{(4)} (Lake Rokonkoma, NY)	Jamestown HS ^{(4)} (Jamestown, NY)	Melverne HS (Melverne, NY)	Arlington HS ^{(4)} (LaGrangeville, NY)
2019 (46th)	Midland Park HS (Midland Park, NJ)	Mineola HS ^{(3)} (Garden City Park, NY)	Sachem Central ^{(5)} (Lake Rokonkoma, NY)	Horseheads HS ^{(3)} (Horseheads, NY)	Medina HS ^{(11)} (Medina, NY)	Arlington HS ^{(5)} (LaGrangeville, NY)
Season cancelled due to COVID-19 pandemic
2021 (48th)	Norwich HS (Norwich, NY); Tie; Marcus Whitman HS ^{(3)} (Rushville, NY)	Phoenix HS ^{(4)} (Phoenix, NY)	Hicksville HS (Hicksville, NY)	Webster (Webster, NY)	Medina HS ^{(12)} (Medina, NY)	Liverpool HS (Liverpool, NY)
2022 (49th)	Division Avenue HS (Levittown, NY)	Roslyn HS (Roslyn Heights, NY)	Sachem Central ^{(6)} (Lake Rokonkoma, NY)	Hicksville HS (Hicksville, NY)	Mineola HS (Garden City Park, NY)	Cicero-North Syracuse HS (Cicero, NY)
2023 (50th)	Mohonasen HS (Schenectady, NY)	Phoenix HS ^{(5)} (Phoenix, NY)	Greece (Greece, NY)	Hicksville HS ^{(3)} (Hicksville, NY)	Mineola HS ^{(2)} (Garden City Park, NY)	Cicero-North Syracuse HS ^{(2)} (Cicero, NY)
2024 (51st)	Le Roy Jr/Sr HS ^{(3)} (Le Roy, NY)	East Syracuse-Minoa HS (East Syracuse, NY)	Copiague HS ^{(3)} (Copiague, NY)	Webster ^{(2)} (Webster, NY)	Roslyn HS (Roslyn Heights, NY)	Arlington HS ^{(6)} (LaGrangeville, NY)
2025 (52nd)	Jordan-Elbridge HS^{(2)} (Jordan, NY)	Oswego HS (Oswego, NY)	Hilton HS (Hilton, NY)	Brentwood HS (Brentwood, NY)	Mineola HS ^{(3)} (Garden City Park, NY)	Liverpool HS ^{(2)} (Liverpool, NY)
2026 (53rd)	Norwich HS ^{(3)} (Norwich, NY)	Oswego HS ^{(2)} (Oswego, NY)	Walt Whitman HS (Huntington Station, NY)	Greece (Greece, NY)	Mineola HS ^{(4)} (Garden City Park, NY)	Arlington HS ^{(7)} (LaGrangeville, NY)

== Band championship count ==
	Band	Number of Total Championships	Years
1	West Genesee HS	33	1974-1977, 1979-1984, 1986, 1989-2003, 2006, 2008, 2009, 2011-2014
2	Jordan-Elbridge HS	15	1977,1980, 1981, 1983. 1985-1988, 1992, 1995, 1996, 1998, 2012, 2018, 2025
2	Medina HS	15	1982, 1989, 1995, 1997, 2000-2002, 2005, 2009-2013, 2019, 2021
3	Marcus Whitman HS	9	1980, 1981, 1996, 1997, 1998, 2003, 2005, 2012, 2021
3	Phoenix HS	9	1985, 1994, 1998, 1999, 2004, 2014, 2017, 2021, 2023
4	East Syracuse-Minoa HS	8	1978, 1979, 1991-1993, 2015, 2017, 2024
4	New Hartford HS	8	1982, 1990, 1991, 1996, 2003, 2008, 2014, 2016
4	Victor HS	8	1989, 1990, 2000, 2001, 2006, 2007, 2010, 2015
5	Arlington HS	7	2004, 2016-2019, 2024, 2026
5	Baldwinsville HS	7	1986, 1994, 2000, 2001, 2004, 2009, 2012
5	Mineola HS	7	2009, 2018, 2019, 2022, 2023, 2025-2026
6	Cicero-North Syracuse HS (Note: [b] Won as Cicero HS, merged with North Syracuse HS in 1983 to become Cicero-North Syracuse HS)	6	1978, 1987, 2016, 2017, 2022, 2023
6	Copiague HS	6	1996, 2002, 2003, 2005, 2006, 2024
6	Eastridge HS	6	1985, 1992-1994, 1998, 1999
6	Northwestern HS (PA)	6	1999,2000,2005-2007, 2016
6	Orchard Park HS	6	1987, 1993, 1997, 2000, 2001, 2007
6	Sachem Central	6	1997, 1999, 2005, 2008, 2019, 2022
6	West Seneca HS	6	2009-2011, 2013, 2015, 2016
7	Central Square HS	5	1987, 1997, 2007, 2008, 2015
7	Horseheads HS	5	1983, 1992, 1999, 2003, 2019
7	Jamestown HS	5	1991, 2002, 2014, 2015, 2018
7	Le Roy Jr/Sr HS	5	1978, 2004, 2005, 2008, 2024
7	Norwich HS	5	2002-2004, 2021, 2026
8	Brentwood HS	4	2006, 2007, 2010, 2025
8	Canandaigua Academy	4	1974, 1977, 1978, 1984
8	Liverpool HS	4	1985, 1988, 2021, 2025
8	Malverne HS	4	2006, 2010, 2011, 2018
8	Mohonasen HS	4	2006, 2008, 2010, 2023
8	Roslyn HS	4	2015, 2017, 2022, 2024
8	Webster HS	4	1989, 1990, 2021, 2024
9	Falconer HS	3	1986, 2001, 2002
9	Hicksville HS	3	2021-2023
9	Westmoreland HS	3	2011-2013
10	Bishop Kearney HS	2	1985, 1987
10	Corning-Painted Post HS	2	2013, 2017
10	Greece	2	2023, 2026
10	Haverling HS	2	1976, 1978
10	Holley Central	2	1975, 1976
10	Huntington HS	2	2004, 2014
10	Johnson City HS	2	2007, 2009
10	Lancaster HS	2	2011, 2013
10	Mohawk HS	2	1981, 1986
10	Norwalk HS (CT)	2	1997, 2005
10	Oswego HS	2	2025-2026
10	Southwestern HS	2	1988, 1995
10	Union-Endicott HS	2	1988, 2014
11	Academy HS (PA)	1	1980
11	Aquinas Institute	1	1984
11	Cassadaga Valley HS	1	1979
11	Division Avenue HS	1	2022
11	Gloverville HS	1	1984
11	Greater Johnstown HS	1	1996
11	Hilton HS	1	2025
11	Keystone HS (PA)	1	1982
11	Kingston HS	1	2012
11	Mahopac HS	1	1992
11	Midland Park HS (NJ)	1	2019
11	Montrose HS (PA)	1	1983
11	Rome Free Academy	1	2018
11	Vestal HS	1	2016
11	Walt Whitman HS	1	2026
11	Wellsville HS	1	2008

== Ties ==
=== 1999–present ===
Bands	Class	Placement	Score	Year
Phoenix HS & Westmoreland HS	SS2	2nd	88.40	2022
Cicero-North Syracuse HS & West Genesee HS	National	2nd	93.45	2021
Horseheads HS & Orchard Park HS	LS2	5th	84.90	2021
Marcus Whitman HS & Norwich HS	SS3	1st	83.75	2021
Cicero-North Syracuse HS & Baldwinsville HS	National	2nd	94.45	2018
Huntington HS & Horseheads HS	LS2	2nd	86.75	2018
Liverpool HS & Brentwood HS	National	5th	92.40	2017
Webster HS & Orchard Park HS	LS2	3rd	87.35	2017
Vestal HS & Westmoreland HS	SS2	3rd	82.40	2017
Division Ave HS & Bath-Haverling HS	SS3	3rd	76.70	2013
Marcus Whitman HS & Westmoreland HS	SS3	1st	76.60	2012
LeRoy HS & Mohonasen HS	SS2	1st	84.10	2008
Homer HS & Wellsville HS	SS3	4th	88.13	2001

=== 1972–1998 ===
Bands	Class	Placement	Score	Year
Liverpool HS & Norwalk HS (CT)	National	3rd	96.22	1998
West Genesee & Norwalk HS (CT)	National	1st	97.18	1997
Eastridge HS & Medina HS	A Open	3rd	76.40	1987
Canandaigua Academy & Horseheads HS	AA	4th	77.30	1987
Central Square HS & East Syracuse-Minoa HS	AA	4th	81.90	1985
Mexico HS & Susquehanna Valley HS	A	9th	67.40	1985
Oswego HS & Vestal HS	A	3rd	72.55	1972

Note: Many of these classes from 1972-1998 changed titles often. I.E., A class in 1972 would eventually become National
