= Masterminds (quiz bowl) =

MasterMinds
- Sport: Quiz Bowl
- Founded: 1993
- First season: 1993-1994
- Organising body: CYPRAS
- Most recent champion: Fairport (2025-2026)
- Most titles: Bethlehem (7)
- Website: http://www.nymasterminds.com

MasterMinds is an academic quiz bowl program active in Upstate New York. There are currently four regions with associated leagues: Albany, Buffalo, Rochester, and Syracuse. Some games in the Albany and Rochester regions are broadcast on public-access television.

== History ==
MasterMinds was founded by CYPRAS in 1993. The first season consisted of schools in the Rochester area. MasterMinds later expanded to schools in Buffalo (1995), Albany (1999), and Syracuse (2003).

== Rules ==
=== General ===
MasterMinds uses NAQT questions. Two teams of up to four players face off answering questions on a wide variety of topics including literature, history, science, visual and auditory arts, philosophy, social science, geography, current events, and popular culture. Each team appoints a captain, denoted by a star on their nameplate. The captain will be preferred in bonus questions, and if there is conflict will be used to clarify. All players are provided with pens and a half sheet of paper for scratch work for computational math questions.

=== Length ===
Starting in the 2023-24 season, games consist of either two seven-minute timed halves or two eight-question halves; this is decided on a league by league basis. If a tossup question or set of bonuses is in progress at the end of a timed half, that round of questioning will be allowed to finished, and if attempts at stalling are witnessed by the adjudicator the game may be nullified and the stalling team disqualified. Starting in 2020, games consisted of two halves with eight questions each, and no set timer. If there was a tie at the end of the 16 questions, more would be read until one team gains or loses points. In 2023, MasterMinds gave individual leagues the choice between timed and set-question games, decided by consensus from constituent teams.

=== Toss-Up Questions ===
Toss-Up questions are worth 10 points. They are asked, and any one person from either team can buzz in and give the answer. If they get the question correct, they earn 10 points for their team which then has the opportunity to answer a set of bonus questions. If a player interrupts the question and supplies an incorrect answer, that player's team may not answer the question again. The opposing team may wait until the question finishes to answer. There is a certain point in each tossup question, typically just before an important clue, called the "power mark". If a player rings in on a toss-up before the "power mark" and answers correctly, they earn 15 points instead of 10. If, however, a player answers incorrectly before the question is over, their team is deducted 5 points. Players may not confer with their teammates during toss-up questions by verbal or nonverbal means. After ringing in to answer a question, players must wait for the adjudicator to verbally recognize them by saying their name and school. If a player does not wait to be recognized, it is treated as an incorrect answer, and the normal procedure for incorrect answers applies.

=== Bonus Questions ===
Following a correct answer to a toss-up question, a team is entitled to a set of three bonus questions centered around a single topic. Each question is worth 10 points, for a total of 30 points. Conferring is allowed and encouraged. Any person from the team may answer a bonus question, however if there are multiple contradicting answers, the adjudicator will ask the captain for a single answer.

== Format ==
=== Regular season ===
During the Regular Season, the teams in each region are divided up into leagues. Most leagues have six teams, though some have five or up to nine. In the 2018-19 season, Albany had six leagues, Buffalo had five leagues, Rochester had ten, and Syracuse had two. The leagues are run with a double or triple round robin format, depending on the number of teams. All teams play twelve regular season games across six rotations, meaning that teams usually play two games each rotation, though they may play more if they were unable to go to an earlier one. There is generally one rotation each month, and they are held at schools in the league. Individual statistics, such as the number of questions answered correctly, the number answered incorrectly, the number of power marks or penalties earned, the number of games and halves played, and the player's average points per half, are kept.

Many participating schools also have Junior Varsity teams, which are ostensibly for students in 10th grade and below. There are generally fewer Junior Varsity teams in each league than Varsity teams, so their tournaments are often quadruple or hextuple round robin. Junior Varsity games are run on the same questions as those for the Varsity division. There are no playoffs for Junior Varsity.

=== Playoffs ===
The top half of Varsity teams (rounded up) by win–loss record from each league advance to the regional playoffs. The playoffs are run with a double elimination format. The playoffs for Albany, Buffalo, and Rochester are spread across multiple days, beginning in mid-to-late April and ending in late May. In the Albany and Buffalo playoffs, the teams that qualified for playoffs are separated into two groups, each of which plays the first four rounds of playoffs, and the teams that remain after those games (two undefeated and four once-defeated) play again at a later date to decide the regional champion. The Rochester league is similar, except that initially the teams are divided into four, and the final match takes place at a date after its competitors are determined, due to fact that there are many more teams in Rochester than in Albany or Buffalo. Correspondingly, Syracuse, the smallest region, concludes its playoffs on a single day. Individual stats are not kept in the playoffs, though an MVP and "All Tournament Team" are stated, presumably on the basis of total points obtained.

The winner of each of the Regional Championships advance to the State Championship in June. The State Championships usually take place at Le Moyne College. The State Championships are run in a round robin format: each team plays each other once, and a champion is decided based on win–loss record. Like in the regional playoffs, individual stats are not kept, but an MVP and "All Tournament Team" are named. The questions used in the regional and state playoffs are of the same difficulty as those used in the regular season.

== State Champions and Regional Winners ==
The first state tournament occurred in 2006.

Year	Albany Leagues	Buffalo Leagues	Rochester Leagues	Syracuse Leagues
2025-2026	Niskayuna	Williamsville North	**Fairport**	Fayetteville-Manlius
2024-2025	Troy	Williamsville North	**Brockport**	Skaneateles
2023-2024	Troy	Williamsville North	**Pittsford Mendon**	Skaneateles
2022-2023	Troy	Grand Island	Brockport	**East Syracuse-Minoa**
2021-2022	**Niskayuna**	Williamsville East	Pittsford Sutherland	Fayetteville-Manlius
2020-2021	Bethlehem	City Honors	Pittsford Mendon	**Bishop Ludden**
2019-2020	no tournament held			
2018-2019	**Troy**	City Honors	Brighton	Bishop Ludden
2017-2018	**Troy**	Nichols School	Victor	Fayetteville-Manlius
2016-2017	**Bethlehem**	Williamsville East	Hilton	Manlius-Pebble Hill
2015-2016	**Bethlehem**	Orchard Park	Pittsford Sutherland	Fayetteville-Manlius
2014-2015	**Bethlehem**	Williamsville East	Brighton	Christian Brothers Academy
2013-2014	**Bethlehem**	Williamsville East	Brighton	East Syracuse-Minoa
2012-2013	**Bethlehem**	Lancaster	Geneva	Fayetteville-Manlius
2011-2012	Bethlehem	St. Joseph's	McQuaid	**Fayetteville-Manlius**
2010-2011	Bethlehem	**City Honors**	McQuaid	Manlius-Pebble Hill
2009-2010	**Bethlehem**	Williamsville North	McQuaid	Jordan-Elbridge
2008–2009	**Guilderland**	Grand Island	McQuaid	Fayetteville-Manlius
2007–2008	**Guilderland**	**Williamsville East**	Fairport	Fayetteville-Manlius
2006–2007	Bethlehem	Canisius	**Irondequoit**	Manlius-Pebble Hill
2005–2006	**Bethlehem**	Williamsville East	School of the Arts	Manlius-Pebble Hill
2004–2005	Bethlehem	Clarence	Brighton	Manlius-Pebble Hill
2003–2004	Bethlehem	Clarence	Wheatland-Chili	Corcoran
2002–2003	Doane Stuart	St. Joseph's	McQuaid	
2001–2002	Niskayuna	Clarence	Geneseo	
2000–2001	Christian Brothers	Clarence	Greece Arcadia	
1999–2000	Berne-Knox-Westerlo	Canisius	School of the Arts	
1998–1999		West Seneca West	Greece Arcadia	
Winners of the State Championship are in **bold text.**

== Participating Schools ==
Albany Leagues (2025-2026)
League	Schools					
1	Broadalbin-Perth	Galway	Gloversville	Johnstown	Mayfield	-
2	Emma Willard	Holy Names	Lansingburgh	Rensselaer	Schenectady	-
3	Burnt Hills-Ballston Lake	Christian Brothers	LaSalle Institute	Niskayuna	Schalmont	-
4	Colonie	Columbia	Guilderland	Saratoga Springs	Schuylerville	Watervliet
5	Berlin	Berne-Knox-Westerlo	Bethlehem	Hoosic Valley	Tamarac	Troy
Schools in italics only participated at the Varsity level.

Buffalo Leagues (2025-2026)
League	Schools					
1	Amherst	Cardinal O'Hara	Depew	Lancaster	Williamsville East	Williamsville North
2	Cleveland Hill	Grand Island	Lew-Port	St. Mary's	-	
3	East Aurora	Iroquois	Lake Shore	Orchard Park	West Seneca East	West Seneca West
Schools in italics only participated at the Varsity level.

Rochester Leagues (2025-2026)
League	Schools					
1	Fairport*	Greece Arcadia	McQuaid Jesuit	Penfield	Spencerport	-
2	Gates Chili	Greece Olympia	Hilton	Rush-Henrietta	Webster Thomas	Wheatland-Chili*
3	Albion	Elba	Holley	Kendall	Medina	Pembroke
4	Aquinas	Brighton	Brockport	Churchville-Chili	Mercy	Webster Schroeder
5	Geneva*	Midlakes	Newark	Penn Yan	-	
6	Canandaigua	Pal-Mac	Red Jacket	Romulus	Wayne	Williamson
7	Clyde-Savannah	Lyons	Marcus Whitman	North Rose-Wolcott	Sodus	-
8	Eastridge	Pittsford Mendon	Pittsford Sutherland	Victor	-	
9	Belfast	Bloomfield	Honeoye	Keshequa	Livonia	Mt. Morris
Schools in italics only participated at the Varsity level. A (*) represents a school with more than one JV team.

Syracuse Leagues (2025-2026)
League	Schools						
1	Cato-Meridian	East Syracuse-Minoa	Fayetteville-Manlius	Jordan-Elbridge	Port Byron	Skaneateles	Weedsport
Schools in italics only participated at the Varsity level.
