= Mike Vanderjagt =

Canadian gridiron football player (born 1970)

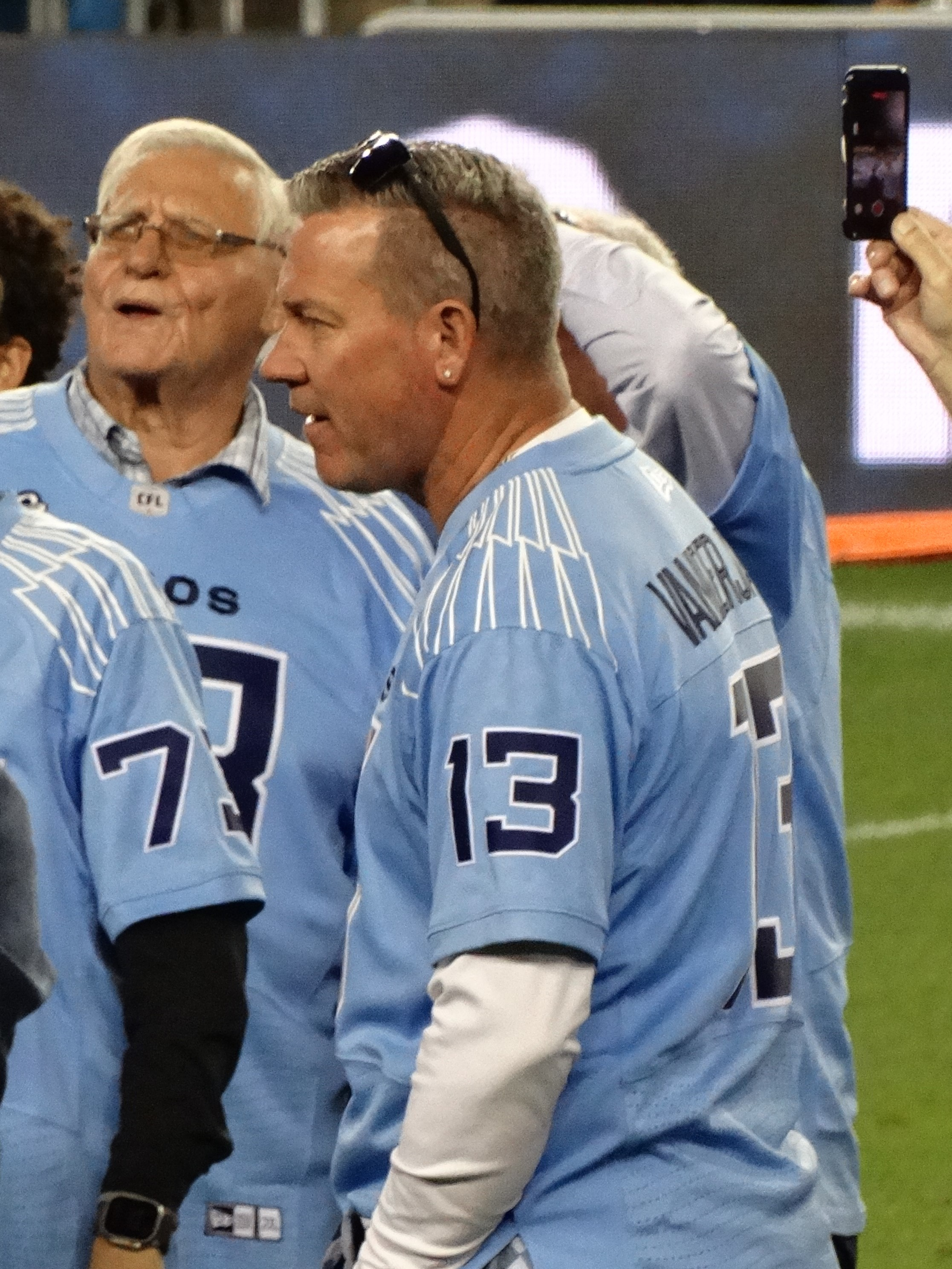
- Vanderjagt in 2023

No. 13, 12
- Positions: Placekicker, punter

Personal information
- Born: March 24, 1970 (age 56); Oakville, Ontario, Canada
- Listed height: 6 ft 5 in (1.96 m)
- Listed weight: 218 lb (99 kg)

Career information
- High school: White Oaks (Oakville, Ontario)
- College: Michigan State (1988); Allan Hancock (1989–1990); West Virginia (1991–1992)
- CFL draft: 1992: 8th round, 58th overall pick

Career history

Playing
- Saskatchewan Roughriders (1993); Hamilton Tiger-Cats (1994)*; Tampa Bay Storm (1995)*; Minnesota Fighting Pike (1996); Toronto Argonauts (1996–1997); Indianapolis Colts (1998–2005); Dallas Cowboys (2006); Toronto Argonauts (2008)
- * Offseason or practice squad member only

Coaching
- Medina Mustangs (2022–present) Special Teams Coach

Awards and highlights
- First-team All-Pro (2003); Second-team All-Pro (1999); Pro Bowl (2003); NFL scoring leader (1999); PFW Golden Toe Award (2003); PFWA All-Rookie Team (1998); 2× Grey Cup champion (1996, 1997); Dick Suderman Trophy (1996); ArenaBowl champion (IX)

Career NFL statistics
- Field goals made: 230
- Field goals attempted: 266
- Field goal %: 86.5%
- Extra points made: 377
- Extra points attempted: 379
- Extra point %: 99.5%
- Points: 1,067
- Longest field goal: 54
- Touchbacks: 11
- Stats at Pro Football Reference

Career CFL statistics
- Field goals made: 112
- Field goals attempted: 150
- Field goal %: 74.7%
- Extra points made: 136
- Extra points attempted: 136
- Extra point %: 100%
- Points: 388
- Punts: 351
- Punting yards: 10,434
- Average punt: 44.3
- Stats at CFL.ca (archived)

Career AFL statistics
- Field goals made: 2
- Field goals attempted: 6
- Field goal %: 33.3%
- Extra points made: 7
- Extra points attempted: 10
- Extra point %: 70%
- Points: 13
- Stats at ArenaFan.com

Michael John Vanderjagt (/ˈvændərˌdʒækt/ VAN-dər-jakt; born March 24, 1970) is a Canadian former professional football placekicker and punter who played in the National Football League (NFL) for nine seasons, primarily with the Indianapolis Colts. He served as the Colts' placekicker from 1998 to 2005 and was a member of the Dallas Cowboys during his final NFL season in 2006. Before the NFL, Vanderjagt played four seasons in the Canadian Football League (CFL), three with the Toronto Argonauts and one with the Saskatchewan Roughriders.

During his CFL career, Vanderjagt won two Grey Cups and received the Dick Suderman Trophy in 1996. His most successful NFL season was in 2003 when he became the first kicker to convert every field goal and point after touchdown during the regular season and playoffs, earning him Pro Bowl and first-team All-Pro honors. Vanderjagt retired as the NFL's most accurate field goal kicker at 86.5%, which ranks eighth in league history. He is also known for missing high-profile field goal attempts and provoking controversy with outspoken comments and antics.

== Early life ==
Vanderjagt attended White Oaks Secondary School, where he was a four-sport athlete (football, basketball, track, and soccer). In 1988, he accepted a scholarship from Michigan State University as a quarterback and placekicker. However, he left Michigan State for Allan Hancock College in Santa Maria, California, where he took over placekicking duties from exiting freshman Jack Garvin (who left to join UCLA).

Vanderjagt punted and played quarterback for AHC until returning to Division I football, as solely a punter and placekicker, at West Virginia University for the 1991 and 1992 seasons. As a junior, he was the team's starting punter, registering 52 punts for 2,040 yards (39.2-yard avg.). In his final season, he was switched to placekicker, ranking third in field goals made (15) and fourth in points scored (72) in the Big East Conference.

== Professional career ==
=== CFL and AFL ===
After graduating from WVU in 1993, he returned to Canada and started a career in the Canadian Football League. Between 1993 and 1996, he was cut by four different CFL teams, getting some playing time with the Saskatchewan Roughriders in 1993. Not playing in the league in 1994 or 1995, Vanderjagt played for the Tampa Bay Storm of the Arena Football League. Vanderjagt also played for the AFL's Minnesota Fighting Pike in the 1996 season before returning to the Toronto Argonauts (who had previously cut him twice) for their 1996 season.

Over the next two seasons, Vanderjagt served as their regular placekicker and punter, as Argos won the Grey Cup in both 1996 and 1997; in those two games, he was 9 of 9. For his 1996 Grey Cup efforts, he was named the game's outstanding Canadian. He also led the CFL in yardage per punt in 1997. Following the 1997 season, Vanderjagt left the Argos to become a free agent, ultimately to play in the National Football League.

=== Indianapolis Colts ===
In 1998, Vanderjagt returned to the United States to join the Indianapolis Colts of the NFL, and was the team's placekicker through the 2005 season. He led the NFL in scoring in 1999.

In a 2000 playoff game against Miami, Vanderjagt successfully converted a 50-yard field goal in the fourth quarter, but missed a 49-yard attempt in overtime. Miami scored on the next possession to win the game.

Following the Colts' elimination from the postseason in 2002, Vanderjagt made critical comments about Colts quarterback Peyton Manning and head coach Tony Dungy to a Canadian television station. Vanderjagt questioned Manning's leadership skills and criticized Dungy for being "mild-mannered". During an interview at the 2003 Pro Bowl, Manning referred to Vanderjagt as the team's "idiot kicker" and accused him of being intoxicated during the interview.

In 2003, Vanderjagt became the first kicker in the league's history to go an entire season, including the playoffs, without missing a field goal or point-after attempt. (In 1998, Minnesota kicker Gary Anderson was perfect in the regular season, but missed a field goal attempt in the playoffs.) In the process, he made his first Pro Bowl and was named first-team All-Pro. He finished the regular season 37 for 37 in field goals and 46 for 46 in PATs. He was also perfect on three field-goal attempts and 12 PATs in the postseason. He did, however, miss a potential game-tying 51-yard field goal in that season's Pro Bowl with three seconds left in a 55–52 loss to the NFC.

In 2004, he kicked 20 field goals, the lowest number of his career. But he also had considerably fewer field goal chances that season (25), as the Colts offense scored 61 touchdowns (nearly four per game), with Peyton Manning throwing a then-NFL record 49 TD passes.

Vanderjagt's streak of 42 consecutive successful field goal attempts, the second longest in NFL history (the league does not include postseason or Pro Bowl games when compiling streaks), ended on September 9, 2004, when he missed a 48-yard attempt against the New England Patriots. The game was 2004's NFL Kickoff game, which the Colts lost 27–24.

Vanderjagt indicated in a radio interview during the season that he might not return to the Colts for 2005, as his cap number was $2.8 million and the Colts might not be willing to pick up his salary for that season. He noted that he may return to the CFL, where his professional career began. However, he eventually signed a reworked deal and returned to the Colts.

In the 2005–06 NFL Playoffs, against the eventual Super Bowl XL champion Pittsburgh Steelers, Vanderjagt missed a 46-yard field goal attempt wide right with 18 seconds remaining, when the Colts were behind 21–18, costing the Colts a chance at overtime and ending the team's season. Walking off the field after the kick, he took off his helmet and threw it to the ground in anger (which cost his team a 15-yard unsportsmanlike conduct penalty). It was Vanderjagt's first field goal miss in the RCA Dome in the postseason.

Shortly thereafter, on January 19, 2006, Vanderjagt appeared on a lighthearted segment of the Late Show with David Letterman, during which he successfully kicked a 46-yard field goal, outside Letterman's Manhattan studio. Letterman, an Indiana native and Colts fan, served as the holder. The appearance was said to be one of the reasons why Vanderjagt was not re-signed in 2006.

During the 2006 offseason, Vanderjagt became a free agent and the Colts elected not to re-sign him. Instead, they signed free agent Adam Vinatieri, who had helped in the Patriots' recent Super Bowl titles. Following Vanderjagt's departure, the Colts won Super Bowl XLI that season.

=== Dallas Cowboys ===
On March 23, 2006, the Cowboys signed Vanderjagt to a three-year, $4.5 million contract that included a $2.5 million signing bonus.

Vanderjagt suffered a groin injury that kept him out of action for two weeks in the preseason. He returned for the final game against the Minnesota Vikings, but missed two field goals in overtime of 32 and 33 yards (both misses were wide right), forcing the contest to end in a tie. Rumors quickly spread that the Cowboys would release Vanderjagt before the start of the regular season, after head coach Bill Parcells was quoted saying, "I think he has been a good kicker. But he keeps telling me that I don't have to worry about him. Well, I'm worried about him now."

However, he remained on the roster when the team was forced to keep backup kicker Shaun Suisham for the first game of the season against the Jacksonville Jaguars. Vanderjagt appeared in each of the Cowboys' subsequent games through Week 12. In Week 9, his potential game-winning field goal was blocked by the Washington Redskins as time expired. In Week 11 against his former team, the Colts, he missed his only two field goal attempts (both of these misses were also wide right), making it the first time since 2001 that he had done so. The fans were so upset, they booed a commercial he appeared in on stadium monitors. After he barely made a 22-yard field goal against Tampa Bay, the Cowboys had seen enough. On November 27, he was released and replaced with Martín Gramática. During his time with the Cowboys, Vanderjagt made 13 of 18 field goal attempts and was 2-for-5 on field goals from 35 yards or more.

=== Toronto Argonauts (second stint) ===
On May 31, 2008, the Toronto Argonauts signed Vanderjagt and traded their veteran kicker Noel Prefontaine to the Edmonton Eskimos. Vanderjagt claimed he really wanted to return to Toronto and his hometown "regardless of what NFL team called" as he missed the sport, missed the area, and missed his friends and family, which include his wife Janalyn and their son Jay Michael. He was released by the Argonauts on his request on May 28, 2009.

== NFL career statistics ==
Year	Team	GP	Field goals				Extra points			Points
Year	Team	GP	FGA	FGM	Lng	Pct	XPA	XPM	Pct	Points
1998	IND	14	31	27	53	87.1	23	23	100.0	104
1999	IND	16	38	34	53	89.5	43	43	100.0	145
2000	IND	16	27	25	48	92.6	46	46	100.0	121
2001	IND	16	34	28	52	82.4	42	41	97.6	125
2002	IND	16	31	23	54	74.2	34	34	100.0	103
2003	IND	16	37	37	50	100.0	46	46	100.0	157
2004	IND	15	25	20	47	80.0	60	59	98.3	119
2005	IND	16	25	23	48	92.0	52	52	100.0	121
2006	DAL	10	18	13	50	72.2	33	33	100.0	72
Career		135	266	230	54	86.5	379	377	99.5	1,067

== Personal life ==
Vanderjagt appeared in a Walt Disney film called The Garbage Picking Field Goal Kicking Philadelphia Phenomenon, where he was the stand-in during football scenes for Tony Danza as a placekicker for the Philadelphia Eagles. He is currently the special teams coach for the Medina Mustangs in Medina, New York.
