= Victor Senior High School =

Location
- 953 High St. Victor, New York 14564; United States; 42°59′24″N 77°24′54″W

Information
- School type: Public High School
- Motto: Respecting diversity and cultivating kindness (formerly "Striving for excellence")
- School district: Victor Central School District
- Principal: Brian Siesto
- Staff: 107.70 (FTE)
- Grades: 9–12
- Enrollment: 1,310 (2023–2024)
- Classes: over 120
- Student to teacher ratio: 12.16
- Campus size: 166 acres (67 ha)
- Colors: Navy and Gold
- Mascot: Blue Devil
- Yearbook: BAGEL (Blue and Gold Ever Lasting)
- Website: vsh.victorschools.org

Victor Senior High School is a public high school located in Victor, New York, and is part of the encompassing Victor Central School District. It is a four year high school covering grades 9-12, which regularly receives both national and state recognition for excellence in education.

Classes are scheduled into 85-minute block periods and follow New York State standards in curriculum. Victor Senior High School offers students 17 Advanced Placement (AP) courses, International Baccalaureate (IB) courses, dual enrollment courses affiliated with FLCC and RIT, engineering courses that follow the Project Lead the Way (PLTW) curriculum, and technical career courses at the Finger Lakes Technical and Career Center (BOCES). On April 20, 2018 it was announced that Assistant Principal Brian Siesto would become the new principal starting in the 2018–2019 school year, as Yvonne O’Shea was to retire. The assistant principals are currently Brian Siesto, Carrie Goodell, and Amy Shannon.

== Demographics ==
Over 1,300 students are enrolled in Victor Senior High School as of 2018. It is ranked the 71st public school in New York State.

School Data
Graduation Rate	Grades Served	Setting	Type of school	Eligible for Title I Funding
97%	9-12	Large Suburb	Public	Yes

Test Scores
College Readiness Index	AP Tested	AP Passed	Mathematics Proficiency	English Proficiency
50.7	61%	78%	87%	97%

Overall Student Performance
State Performance Index	Gap Between Actual and Expected Performance Index
120.4	12.7

Population Demographics (% of total population)
Total enrollment	Male	Female	Minority	Economically Disadvantaged
1,342 students	50%	50%	9%	15%

Student Diversity
American Indian/Alaskan Native	Asian	Black	Hawaiian Native/Pacific Islander	Hispanic	White	Two or More Races
0.3%	3%	2%	0%	3%	91%	0.4%

== Regents ==
The Regents Diploma is the standard high school diploma received by students in New York State. It involves passing a series of Regents Examinations given by the New York State Department of Education. There is also a Regents Diploma with Advanced Designation for students who are willing to take slightly more courses.

== Clubs and Activities ==
Victor Senior High School offers a variety of extracurricular activities, ranging from sports to music to volunteering.

- Aquatic Leaders Club
- Art Club
- Big Time Friends
- Chess Club
- DECA
- Drama Club
- FIRST Robotics
- French Club
- Go Green Garden Team
- Global Competency Club
- International Club
- Jazz Ensemble
- Key Club
- Literary Magazine
- Marching Band
- Masterminds
- Math Academic Team
- Medical Explorers
- Mentor Program - Link Crew
- National Honor Society
- Outdoor Activities Club
- Percussion Drumline (VIPE)
- Quidditch
- S.E.A.S. Club
- Spanish Club
- Student Council
- Tri-M Music Honor Society
- Victor Cares Club
- Winterguard
- Yearbook

== The Victor Marching Blue Devils ==
The Victor Marching Blue Devils is an extra-curricular marching band program that has been a long and upstanding tradition in the Victor Central School District. The group celebrated its 25th season of involvement in the New York State Field Band Conference (NYFBC) in 2006.

The group's history includes winning six NYSFBC State Championships (including the 2006 and 2007 NYSFBC Small School Division 1 State Championships) and the 2006 USSBA Yamaha Cup Group 4 Open Championship. In 2008, they moved up to the National Class in the NYSFBC, taking second place at the State Championships at the Carrier Dome in 2009. That same year, they placed fifth on a national level at the USSBA National Championships in Group 5.

In 2010, the Marching Blue Devils placed first in the National Class at the NYSFBC Championships with a score of 97.05 following an undefeated season in New York State. The group also returned to the United States Scholastic Band Association (USSBA) National Championships in 2010 and placed fourth in Group 5. In 2011 at the USSBA National Championships in Maryland, the colorguard placed first in their caption of best colorguard, naming them the best colorguard in the nation for the 2011 season. With their 2012 show, "SPIN" they brought home third place in the National Class at the NYSFBC Championships. In 2013, the group performed a show entitled "THE HEIST" and in 2014 a show entitled "MOBY DICK" where they brought home the third-place trophy once again. In 2015, they performed the show "LIGHT TO DARK, DARK TO LIGHT" a color progression show where they took first overall and in every caption.

== Scheduling ==
Victor Senior High School utilizes a 4x4 block schedule, spanning two semesters, in which students have four, 85-minute classes each day, in unique combinations that cycle every four days. Each of the four days is identified by a letter of the alphabet; A, B, C, and D. There are essentially only two sets of classes that each student has to memorize, with the only difference being that on one of the four letter days, students either have a laboratory class or physical education. The laboratory class, which acts as just an additional science class, is required in order for students to be able to take the Regents Examinations at the end of the school year.

In the event of a snow day or any other cancellation of classes, those that were scheduled for the day of the cancellation are skipped over, ensuring that the proceeding schedule remains unaffected.

== Notable alumni ==
- Rushawn Baker, NFL running back
- Mike Novitsky, NFL center for the Seattle Seahawks
