= Regy Thorpe =

American lacrosse player & coach (born 1971)

Current position
- Title: Head coach
- Team: Syracuse Orange
- Conference: Atlantic Coast Conference

Biographical details
- Born: November 27, 1971 (age 54); Auburn, New York, U.S.
- Education: Syracuse University

Playing career
- 1990–1991: Herkimer CC (NJCAA)
- 1992–1993: Syracuse Orange (NCAA)
- 1995–2009: Rochester Knighthawks (NLL)
- 2001–2006: Rochester Rattlers (MLL)
- Position: Defense

Coaching career (HC unless noted)
- 1998: Iroquois men’s national team (assistant)
- 1999: Iroquois men’s national team U-19 (assistant)
- 2006: Rochester Knighthawks (GM)
- 2007–2009, 2014: Six Nations Arrows (OJLL)
- 2010–2019: Syracuse (women's) (assoc.)
- 2011–2012: Hamilton Nationals
- 2015: Jordan-Elbridge HS
- 2015: Haudenosaunee U-19 girls
- 2017–2018: Long Island Sound (UWLX)
- 2019, 2024: U.S. Lacrosse Indoor Box Lacrosse World Team
- 2021: New York Riptide
- 2022–2025: Florida (women's) (assoc.)
- 2025–: Syracuse (women's)
- NLL Hall of Fame; Inducted in 2021

Regy Thorpe (born November 27, 1971) is currently the head coach of the women's lacrosse team at Syracuse University, where he played the sport collegiately.

He is a former professional lacrosse player for the Rochester Knighthawks in the National Lacrosse League. He played his entire NLL career with the Knighthawks. He also played with the Rochester Rattlers of Major League Lacrosse. Currently, Thorpe is the head coach for the Hamilton Nationals of Major League Lacrosse.

== Career ==
Thorpe played for two years at Herkimer County Community College, where he earned All-America honors and was named the NJCAA Defenseman of the Year in 1991. He then enrolled at Syracuse University and helped the Orange to the national finals in 1992. In his senior season, Thorpe earned All-America honors after leading Syracuse to a national title as a team captain.

Thorpe has been a member of the Rochester Knighthawks since the team's inaugural season in 1995. He is the only member of the original team still with the Knighthawks. During the 2007 NLL season, Thorpe was named team captain, in the absence of injured Mike Hasen, and helped lead his team to the winning of the Champion's Cup.

In August 2008, Thorpe was named the new GM of the Knighthawks. It was announced at the time that he had retired from playing to take the GM job, but in November, Thorpe signed a playing contract, becoming the first player-GM in NLL history.

Thorpe gave up his front-office duties after the season, and it appeared his playing career was over as well, but in the first week of February 2010, he was re-signed to the Knighthawks roster to provide experience and physicality on the defense.

Thorpe had also played with the Rochester Rattlers for the team's initial six seasons before retiring. He was initially acquired by the Rattlers in the 10th round of the 2001 MLL Supplemental Draft.

Internationally, Thorpe represented Team USA in the 2002 and 2004 Heritage Cup, and also won a bronze medal with Team USA in the 2007 World Indoor Lacrosse Championships.

Thorpe officially retired as an active NLL player on December 4, 2010.

Thorpe is a member of the Jordan Elbridge Hall of Fame, the US Lacrosse Rochester Chapter Hall of Fame, the NJCAA Lacrosse Hall of Fame (2011), and the Rochester Knighthawks National Lacrosse League Hall of Fame.

== Coaching ==
Thorpe was a player-coach for the Rochester Rattlers in 2006, before becoming a Head Coach for the Six Nations Arrows of the Ontario Junior A Lacrosse League before the 2007 summer season. He has also coached the Jordan-Elbridge High School lacrosse team.

On February 3, 2011, Thorpe was named the head coach of the Hamilton Nationals of Major League Lacrosse.

In 2022, Thorpe was named the associate head coach at Florida and helped the Gators capture four straight conference titles.

On June 6, 2025, Thorpe was named the fourth head coach of the Syracuse Orange women's lacrosse team after Kayla Treanor's departure. He had previously worked for the Syracuse women's lacrosse team from 2010 until 2019. He served as an assistant coach, recruiting coordinator and later associate head coach on Gary Gait's staff.

== Statistics ==
=== NLL ===
| | | Regular Season | | | | | | Playoffs |
| Season | Team | GP | G | A | Pts | LB | PIM | GP | G | A | Pts | LB | PIM |
|---|---|---|---|---|---|---|---|---|---|---|---|---|---|
| 1995 | Rochester | 8 | 0 | 3 | 3 | 31 | 12 | 2 | 0 | 5 | 5 | 10 | 2 |
| 1996 | Rochester | 10 | 0 | 5 | 5 | 72 | 30 | 1 | 0 | 0 | 0 | 9 | 0 |
| 1997 | Rochester | 10 | 0 | 10 | 10 | 56 | 36 | 2 | 0 | 1 | 1 | 14 | 4 |
| 1998 | Rochester | 12 | 0 | 6 | 6 | 68 | 36 | 1 | 0 | 0 | 0 | 2 | 0 |
| 1999 | Rochester | 12 | 1 | 6 | 7 | 71 | 28 | 2 | 0 | 0 | 0 | 8 | 0 |
| 2000 | Rochester | 12 | 1 | 4 | 5 | 65 | 27 | 2 | 0 | 0 | 0 | 8 | 10 |
| 2001 | Rochester | 14 | 0 | 5 | 5 | 80 | 19 | 1 | 0 | 0 | 0 | 5 | 8 |
| 2002 | Rochester | 13 | 0 | 6 | 6 | 79 | 29 | 2 | 0 | 1 | 1 | 15 | 0 |
| 2003 | Rochester | 15 | 1 | 5 | 6 | 100 | 14 | 2 | 0 | 2 | 2 | 14 | 2 |
| 2004 | Rochester | 16 | 0 | 5 | 5 | 78 | 22 | 1 | 0 | 0 | 0 | 7 | 4 |
| 2005 | Rochester | 16 | 1 | 2 | 3 | 67 | 27 | 2 | 0 | 2 | 2 | 12 | 2 |
| 2006 | Rochester | 16 | 1 | 4 | 5 | 61 | 29 | 2 | 0 | 1 | 1 | 6 | 2 |
| 2007 | Rochester | 15 | 0 | 5 | 5 | 47 | 27 | 3 | 0 | 2 | 2 | 4 | 4 |
| 2008 | Rochester | 12 | 0 | 4 | 4 | 39 | 27 | -- | -- | -- | -- | -- | -- |
| 2009 | Rochester | 12 | 0 | 1 | 1 | 52 | 22 | 0 | 0 | 0 | 0 | 0 | 0 |
| NLL totals | | 193 | 5 | 71 | 76 | 966 | 385 | 23 | 0 | 14 | 14 | 114 | 38 |

=== MLL ===
| | | Regular Season | | | | | | | Playoffs |
| Season | Team | GP | G | 2ptG | A | Pts | LB | PIM | GP | G | 2ptG | A | Pts | LB | ! PIM |
|---|---|---|---|---|---|---|---|---|---|---|---|---|---|---|---|
| 2001 | Rochester | 13 | 0 | 0 | 0 | 0 | 24 | 6 | 1 | 0 | 0 | 0 | 0 | 2 | 1 |
| 2002 | Rochester | 14 | 0 | 0 | 0 | 0 | 42 | 7 | - | - | - | - | - | - | - |
| 2003 | Rochester | 9 | 0 | 0 | 0 | 0 | 19 | 6 | - | - | - | - | - | - | - |
| 2004 | Rochester | 12 | 0 | 0 | 1 | 1 | 17 | 7 | 1 | 0 | 0 | 0 | 0 | 3 | 1 |
| 2005 | Rochester | 4 | 0 | 0 | 0 | 0 | 6 | 5 | - | - | - | - | - | - | - |
| 2006 | Rochester | 11 | 0 | 0 | 0 | 0 | 23 | 6 | - | - | - | - | - | - | - |
| MLL Totals | | 63 | 0 | 0 | 1 | 1 | 131 | 37 | 2 | 0 | 0 | 0 | 0 | 5 | 2 |

=== NLL head coaching statistics ===
| Team | Season | Regular Season | | | | Playoffs | | | | Playoff result |
| Team | Season | GC | W | L | W% | GC | W | L | W% | Playoff result |
|---|---|---|---|---|---|---|---|---|---|---|
| New York Riptide | 2020 | 13 | 1 | 12 | .077 | – | – | – | – | Season suspended due to the COVID-19 pandemic |
| Totals:: | 1 | 13 | 1 | 12 | .077 | – | – | – | – | |
