= Ernie Clark (American football) =

American football player (1937–2024)

No. 59
- Position: Linebacker

Personal information
- Born: August 11, 1937; Arcadia, Florida, U.S.
- Died: March 10, 2024 (aged 86); Buffalo, New York, U.S.
- Listed height: 6 ft 1 in (1.85 m)
- Listed weight: 220 lb (100 kg)

Career information
- High school: Medina (Medina, New York)
- College: Michigan State
- NFL draft: 1963: 13th round, 180th overall pick

Career history
- Detroit Lions (1963–1967); St. Louis Cardinals (1968); New Orleans Saints (1969)*; Hamilton Tiger-Cats (1969)
- * Offseason or practice squad member only

Career NFL statistics
- Fumble recoveries: 7
- Interceptions: 4
- Sacks: 11.5
- Stats at Pro Football Reference

Ernest Robert Clark (August 11, 1937 – March 10, 2024) was an American professional football player who was a linebacker in the National Football League (NFL) for five seasons with the Detroit Lions and one for the St. Louis Cardinals. He played college football for the Michigan State Spartans. Clark died on March 10, 2024, at the age of 86.
