= Douglas Isaac Busch =

American photographer, inventor, teacher, and architect

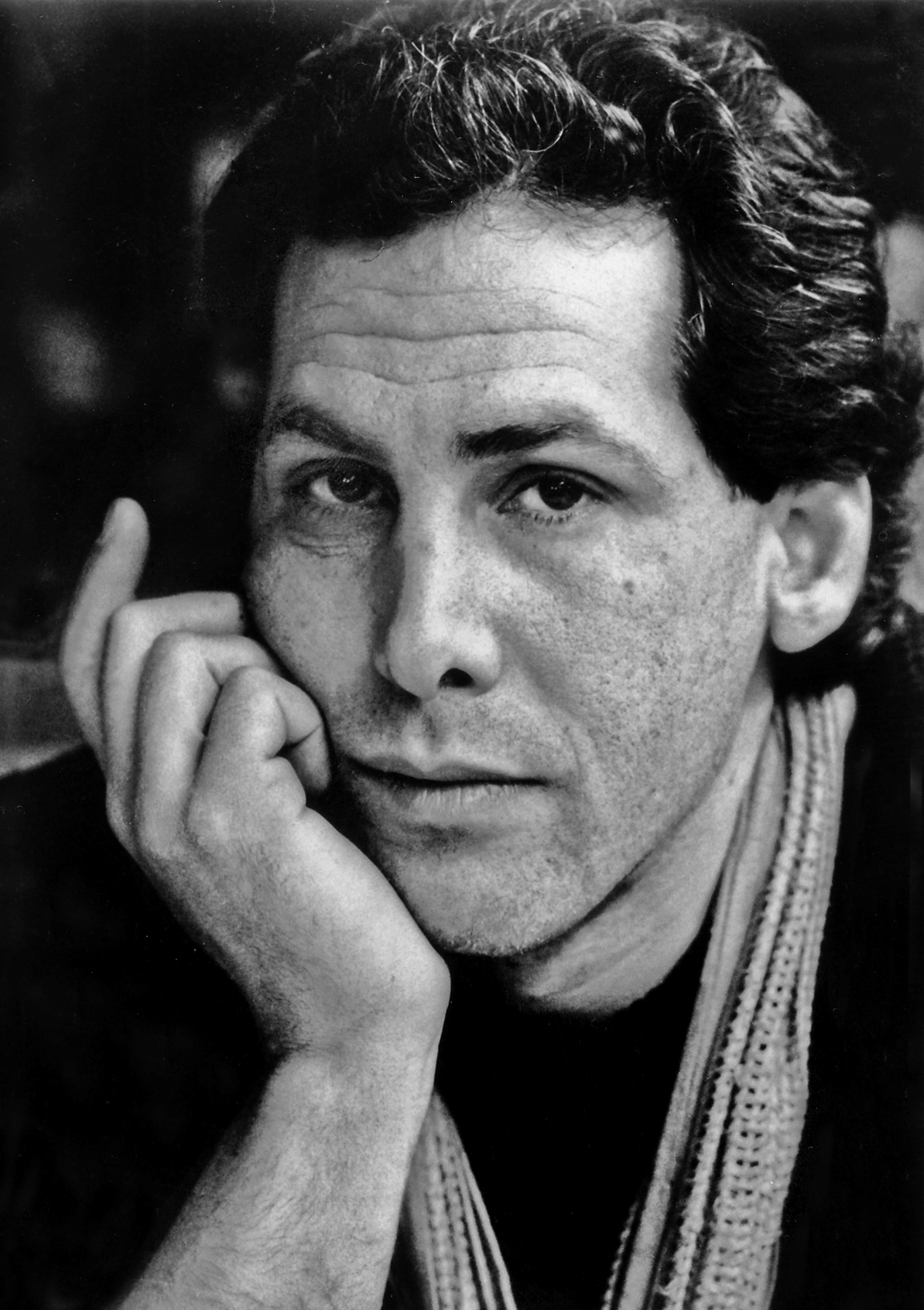

Douglas Busch (born 1951) is an American photographer, inventor, teacher, and architectural designer known for using the world's largest portable view cameras and negatives to produce the world's largest photographic contact prints. His photography encompasses an array of subjects, including landscapes, cityscapes, nudes, portraits, and color, and is in the collections of major institutions such as the J. Paul Getty Museum, the Smithsonian Institution, Los Angeles County Museum of Art, and the Museum of Contemporary Art in Los Angeles. Busch's imaginative architectural work and drought-tolerant landscape designs have attracted celebrity clientele and have been featured in the Los Angeles Times, Robb Report, Western Interiors and Design, Open House, and Distinctive Homes. His dedication to the principles of healthy design and sustainable building practices led him to launch pH Living: Healthy Housing Systems, with the goal of providing homes for people who suffer from environmental allergies and chemical sensitivities. He also developed a vertical herb and vegetable production system called Farm in a Box.

== Early life and education ==
Busch was born in Miami Beach, Florida, to Jewish parents William Goldworn and Enid Gottlieb Goldworn. He was a photographer for his high school newspaper. At the University of Illinois, he majored in cinematography, photography, and graphic design; served as president of the photo-cine co-op; and participated in a newly created independent study program.

== Career ==
After graduating from the University of Illinois in 1970, Busch moved to Carmel, California, where he worked as an assistant to Morley Baer and Al Weber. He assisted Ansel Adams on Portfolio VI, washing prints. He assisted his mentor, Al Weber, on workshops throughout the Four Corners area.

Busch took a job with Finlay Enterprises, a division of Seligman and Latz. He worked in the diamond department and then was promoted to assistant to the fine jewelry department before being placed in the Globe Store in Scranton, Pennsylvania, where he ran the leased fine jewelry department. He received his diamond degree in 1973 from the Gemological Institute of America, and moved to Rockford, Illinois, to work in the family jewelry business, Busch Jewelers.

Busch published his first photography portfolio, Portfolio I, in 1974. In 1986, he left the jewelry business to pursue photography and established De Golden Busch Inc., a design and manufacturing company of SuperLarge™ cameras, lenses, film holders, print washers, and accessories. Over the next 50 years, Busch worked on numerous photographic series.

In the 1980s, he taught at the Victor School in Victor, Colorado, and produced the Victor Portfolio of ten 12x20" photographic contact prints, the Denver Portfolio, and the North Central IL Portfolio. His work was exhibited at the Rockford Art Museum, the Fallen Angels Project, and 510 E. State Street Gallery.

Busch moved to Los Angeles in 1992. That year, he produced his first book, "In Plain Sight," which received an award for the best book of the year from a small publisher. In 1994, he returned to the University of Illinois for one year of postgraduate study of photography, during which produced the Farmlands Project. During this time Busch traveled throughout the United States and Europe, partaking in visiting artist programs, teaching workshops, and lecturing.

Busch and his wife, Lori, started the No-Strings Foundation, a 501(c)(3) grant-making organization based in Malibu, California, in May 2005. Its primary mission was to provide direct financial support to individual photographers in the United States.

Busch began to design and build houses in the mid-2000s. He has completed over 30 projects to date. In 2009, he started ecoTECH Design Studio to design and build sustainable architecture and landscapes, to educate the public through the creation of the ecoPARK "Greenposium," and to design and build sustainable low-carbon products to reduce waste and grow food.

In 2011, Busch started pH Living: Healthy Housing Systems. Working with Lawrence Gust, a certified building biologist and chairman of the board of bau-Biologie and Ecology USA, Busch developed a healthy housing system for people who suffer from environmental allergies and chemical sensitivities and as a healthier alternative for people in general. He spoke at Pratt & Whitney Rocketdyne’s international Ninth Annual Forum of the In2:InThinking Network in April 2010 on the importance of saving our planet for our children and future generations.

== Museum collections ==
- George Eastman Museum, Rochester, New York
- J. Paul Getty Museum, Los Angeles, California
- Los Angeles County Museum of Art, Los Angeles, California
- Museum of Contemporary Art of Georgia, Atlanta, Georgia
- Portland Art Museum, Portland, Oregon

== Books ==
- 2019 Appropriated Berlin: Dead Like You (Paper Mirror Press, Chicago, IL)
- 2019 China Observations: Interested Indifference (Paper Mirror Press, Chicago, IL)
- 2019 Holistic Architecture: Trancas Project (Paper Mirror Press, Chicago, IL)
- 2019 Much Ado About Nothing: Notes in Passing (Paper Mirror Press, Chicago, IL)
- 2019 Suggestive Nature (Paper Mirror Press, Chicago, IL)
- 2019 Zuma Foam, with poems by Florence Weinberger (Paper Mirror Press, Chicago, IL)
- 2012 Scene on the Street (Nazraeli Press / Santa Barbara Museum of Art, Paso Robles, CA)
- 2009 Appropriated Berlin, Limited Edition of 10 original photographs and stand
- 2008 Silent Waves, Limited Edition of 10 original photographs and stand
- 2007 Silent Waves, Limited Edition (The Photo Department, Malibu, CA)
- 2006 California Gardens (Wade Publishing, London, UK)
- 2006 Cruising Miami (Braus Editions, Germany, and Paper Mirror Press, Chicago, IL)
- 2006 Vestiges (Braus Editions, Germany, and Paper Mirror Press, Chicago, IL)
- 2006 Flesh as Canvas (Braus Editions, Germany, and Paper Mirror Press, Chicago, IL)
- 2006 Fallen Angels (Braus Editions, Germany, and Paper Mirror Press, Chicago, IL)
- 2006 Self Subject (Braus Editions, Germany, and Paper Mirror Press, Chicago, IL)
- 2006 Italian Gardens (Braus Editions, Germany)
- 2005 Retrospective: From Miami to Malibu (Braus Editions, Germany)
- 2005 Vestiges (Lindemanns Verlay, Stuttgart, Germany)
- 1994 Tides in Time (The Photo Department, Santa Monica, CA)
- 1992 In Plain Sight (The Photo Department, Rockford, IL)
