= Jordan-Elbridge Central School District =

School district in New York, United States

Location
- Jordan & Elbridge Onondaga County, New York United States
- Coordinates: 43.0689°N 76.4709°W

District information
- Type: Public
- Grades: PreK–12
- Established: 1961
- Superintendent: James R. Froio
- Schools: 3
- Budget: 2015-16 $29,198,000
- NCES District ID: 3615990

Students and staff
- Students: 1,554
- Teachers: 135.02 (on FTE basis)
- Student–teacher ratio: 11.51:1
- District mascot: Eagles
- Colors

Other information
- Website: www.jecsd.org

The Jordan-Elbridge Central School District consists of two different villages, Jordan and Elbridge both of which are in Onondaga County, New York which is located in Central New York, US. The population as of 2010 according to the U.S. Census Bureau is: the Jordan village total population, 1,368 people; the Elbridge village total population, 1,058 people; and Town of Elbridge, in Onondaga County, New York, total population 5,922 people (as of 2010 Census).

== Elbridge Elementary ==
Elbridge Elementary is home to Universal Pre-Kindergarten-3rd graders.

== Ramsdell Elementary ==
Ramsdell Elementary was originally 3-5th until the Fall of 2012 the new school year. When they had a low number of enroll mean of Students.

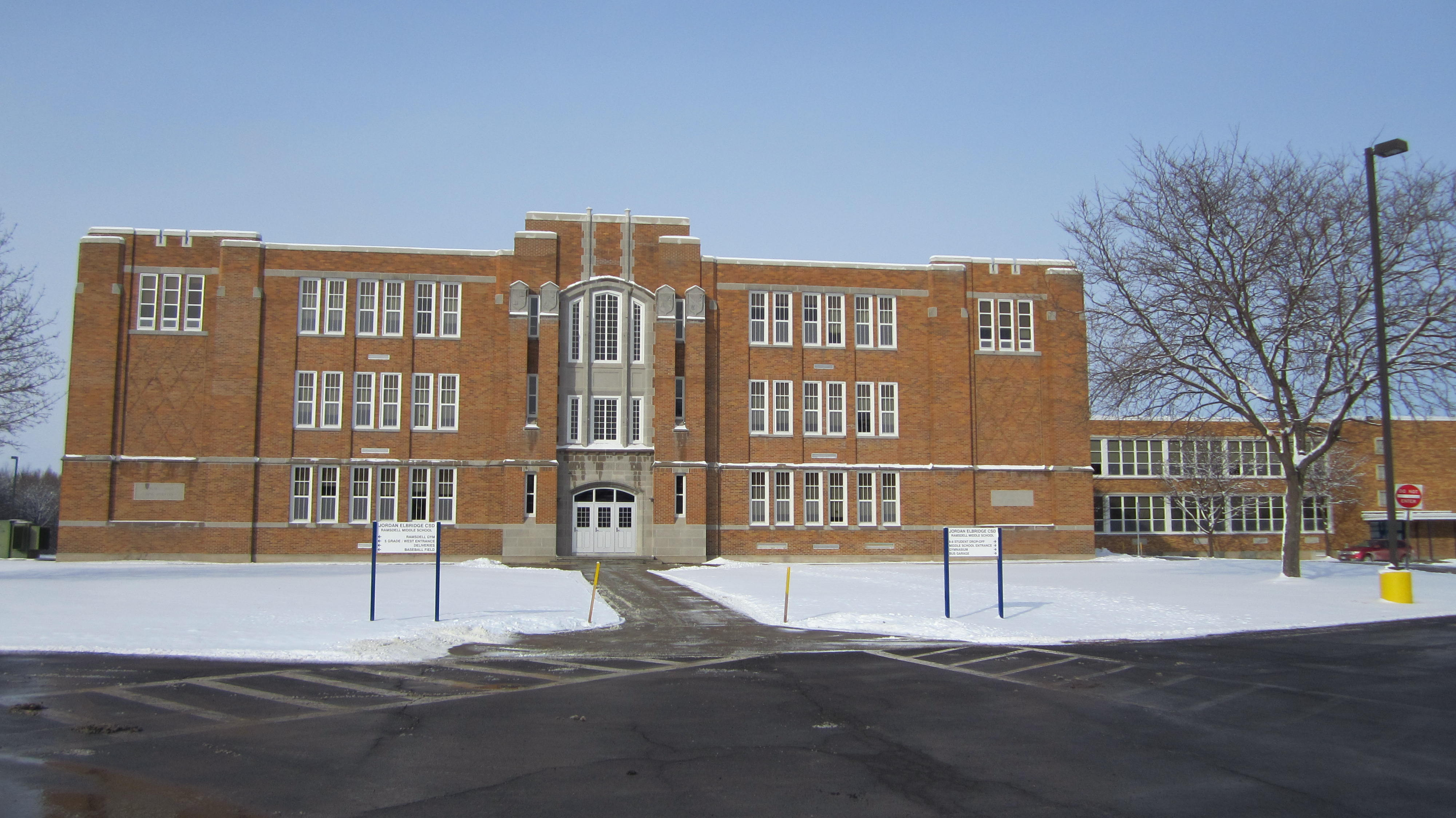
Ramsdell Elementary School 2013

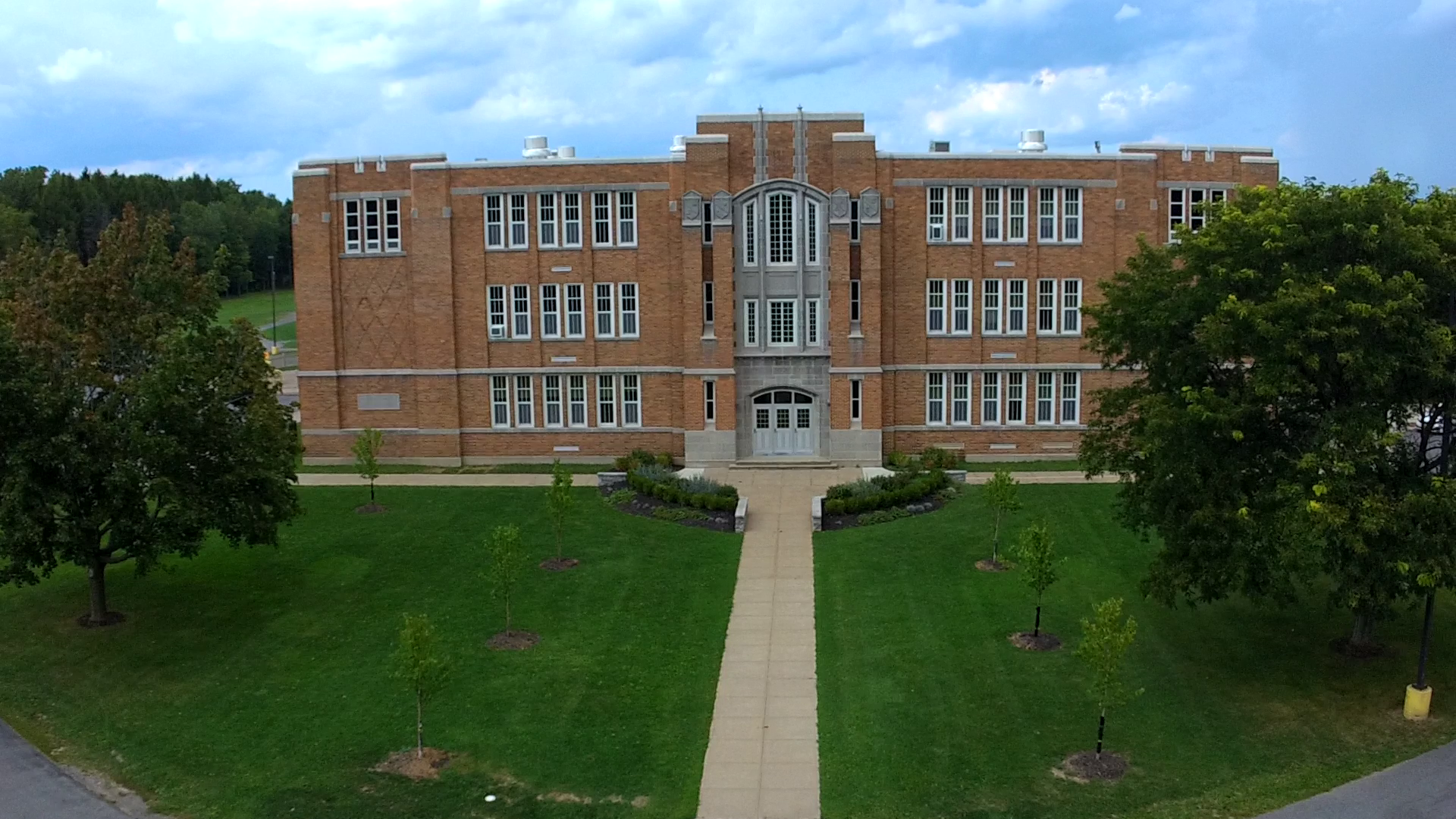
Ramsdell Remodeled Entrance Summer 2018

== Ramsdell Middle School ==
As of September 2012 to present. Ramsdell Middle School holds 5-8th grades.

== Jordan-Elbridge High School ==
Jordan-Elbridge High School teaches the 9th to 12th grades.

== Address ==
The Jordan-Elbridge School District is located in Onondaga County. Jordan-Elbridge Elementary (UPK-3) Address is "130 East Main Street, P.O. Box 170 Elbridge, NY 13060", "Jordan-Elbridge Ramsdell Middle School (4-8) Address is 9 North Chappell Street, P.O. Box 1150 Jordan, NY 13080" & "High School (9-12) Address is 5721 Hamilton Road, P.O. Box 901 Jordan, NY 13080"
