= Washington Mills, New York =

Hamlet in New York, United States

Coordinates: 43°03′00″N 75°16′23″W

Location in Oneida County and the state of New York

Washington Mills is a hamlet and census-designated place in the Town of New Hartford, a suburb of Utica, New York, United States. As of the 2020 census, Washington Mills had a population of 1,219.

Washington Mills is located off New York State Route 8.

== Education ==
The CDP is in the New Hartford Central School District.
