= Schalmont High School =

Location
- 1 Sabre Dr., Schenectady, NY 12306; Rotterdam, New York; United States
- 42.781946°N 74.016758°W

Information
- Type: Public
- School district: Schalmont Central School District
- Principal: Matthew Heckman
- Teaching staff: 49.22 (FTE)
- Grades: 9–12
- Enrollment: 541 (2023-2024)
- Student to teacher ratio: 10.99
- Colors: Green & White
- Athletics conference: Colonial Council
- Mascot: Sabre Toothed Tiger
- Website: https://www.schalmont.org/schalmont-high-school/

Schalmont High School is a public high school located in the Town of Rotterdam, New York State. It is part of the Schalmont Central School District, which serves communities in Schenectady, Albany and Montgomery Counties. The high school is attached to Schalmont Middle School.

== Course levels ==
Schalmont High School has a variety of different course levels and types to accommodate the different needs of students. Types include Advanced Placement, SUPA (Syracuse University Project Advance), Honors, and Regents courses.

== Courses in advanced study ==
Schalmont High School offers numerous Advanced Placement courses to its students. Decision to enroll in AP courses is at the discretion of the student and their guidance counselor, though teacher recommendations may also be influential. At present, the following Honors and AP courses are available to students: Algebra 2 H, AP English Literature and Composition, AP US History, AP Calculus AB, Chemistry Honors, English 10 Honors, Geometry Honors, Living Environment Honors and Pre-Calculus Honors).

== Music ==
The high school has a general band and an audition-selected band called "Concert Band" and "Wind Ensemble" respectively. There is also a general chorus and an audition-selected chorus called "Chorus" and "Concert Choir". Schalmont also offers the courses History of Rock and Roll I, II, and III, and Music Theory. The high school also has a marching band called the Schalmont Marching Sabres, and a high school jazz ensemble.

== Extracurricular activities ==
Schalmont high school offers a wide variety of extracurricular activities.

=== Student government ===
Schalmont high school has a student government system in which each class elects people to both their class government and an overall student government board. The student government meets monthly while individual class government meetings may vary. The president of the senior student government board for the high school reads the morning announcements, along with principal Matthew Heckman.

=== Sports ===
Schalmont is home of the Sabres. Its various sports teams include Cross-Country and Track, Golf, Football, Tennis, Boys and Girls Soccer, Basketball, Girls Volleyball, Baseball, Bowling, Wrestling, Softball, Girls Swimming, Boys Swimming, Modified Swimming, Ice Hockey, and Cheerleading (for both Football and Basketball).

In the 2010 season, the boys varsity football team concluded their best season in school history by reaching the Class B State Championship in the Syracuse Carrier Dome but fell to Hornell 50 - 20. The team finished with a school record 12-1 season. The current 2013 season of boys football is also reaching the Class B state championship game in the Syracuse Carrier Dome again for the 2nd time in the school's history.

=== Clubs and organizations ===
Schalmont High School sponsors many student-organizations. They include but are not limited to:

Environmental Concerned Club (ECC), International Club, Key Club, Fusion GSA, Ski Club, Student Government, National Honor Society, Science Honor Society, Tri-M Music Honor Society, TIGERS, Masterminds, and Yearbook - Le Sabre as well as many others. Some clubs in the school also have their own independent class officer positions, with their own elections, much like student council.

== Notable alumni ==
- Angelo Santabarbara (Class of 1990), Democratic member of the New York State Assembly
- Lisa Barlow (Class of 1992), businesswoman and television personality
- Dr. Shrey Patel (Class of 2015), neurosurgery resident at Northwell (Hofstra)
