= Marcus Whitman Central School District =

School district in New York, United States

Location
- Rushville, New York United States

District information
- Motto: Together We Can
- Grades: K–12
- Superintendent: Christopher Brown
- Schools: 4

Students and staff
- Athletic conference: Section V
- District mascot: Wildcats
- Colors: Blue and Gold

Other information
- Website: Marcus Whitman Central School District

The Marcus Whitman Central School District is a school district in Rushville, New York, United States, and serves Rushville, Middlesex, and Gorham. The superintendent is Dr. Christopher Brown. The district operates four schools: Marcus Whitman High School, Marcus Whitman Middle School, Gorham Elementary School, and Middlesex Valley Elementary School.

== Administration ==
The district offices are located at 4100 Baldwin Road in Rushville. The current superintendent is Dr. Christopher Brown.

=== Selected Former Superintendents ===
Previous assignment and reason for departure denoted in parentheses

- Richard A. Conover–?-1969 (Unknown, named Superintendent of Waterloo Central School District)
- William VanLare
- Charles R. Wiltse–?-2002 (Unknown, retired)
- Keith R. Eddinger–2002-2005 (Principal - Marcus Whitman Middle School, retired)
- Oren Cook–2005-2008 (Superintendent - Adriondack Central School, took leave of absence)
- Michael A. Chirco–2008-2013 (Interim Assistant Superintendent for Instructional Services - Marcus Whitman Central School District, retired)
- Jeramy M. Clingerman–2013-2019 (Principal - Waterloo High School, named Superintendent of Seneca Falls Central School District)

== Marcus Whitman High School ==
Marcus Whitman High School

Information
- Principal: Eric Pasho
- Grades: 9–12
- Website: Marcus Whitman High School

Marcus Whitman High School is located at 4100 Baldwin Road, in Rushville and serves grades 9 through 12. The current principal is Eric Pasho.

=== History ===
==== Selected former principals ====
Previous assignment and reason for departure denoted in parentheses

- Mr. Howard Shanklin–1968–1973 (unknown, named Curriculum Coordinator for Marcus Whitman Central Schools)
- Mr. Ronald A. Davis–1973–1991 (Vice Principal - Marcus Whitman High School, retired)
- Mr. Dean T. Duffy–1991–2001 (Vice Principal - Marcus Whitman High School, retired)
- Ms. Lynn Muscarella–2001-2004 (Unknown, named Principal of Oakfield Middle/High School)
- Dr. Susan H. Wissick–2004-2006 (Unknown, named Principal of Middlesex Valley Elementary School)
- Mr. Mark D. Sissell–2006-2008 (Principal - Campbell-Savona High School, named Superintendent of Westfield Academy and Central School)
- Mr. Alan R. DeGroote–2008–2012 (Principal - Marcus Whitman Middle School, retired)

== Marcus Whitman Middle School ==
Marcus Whitman Middle School
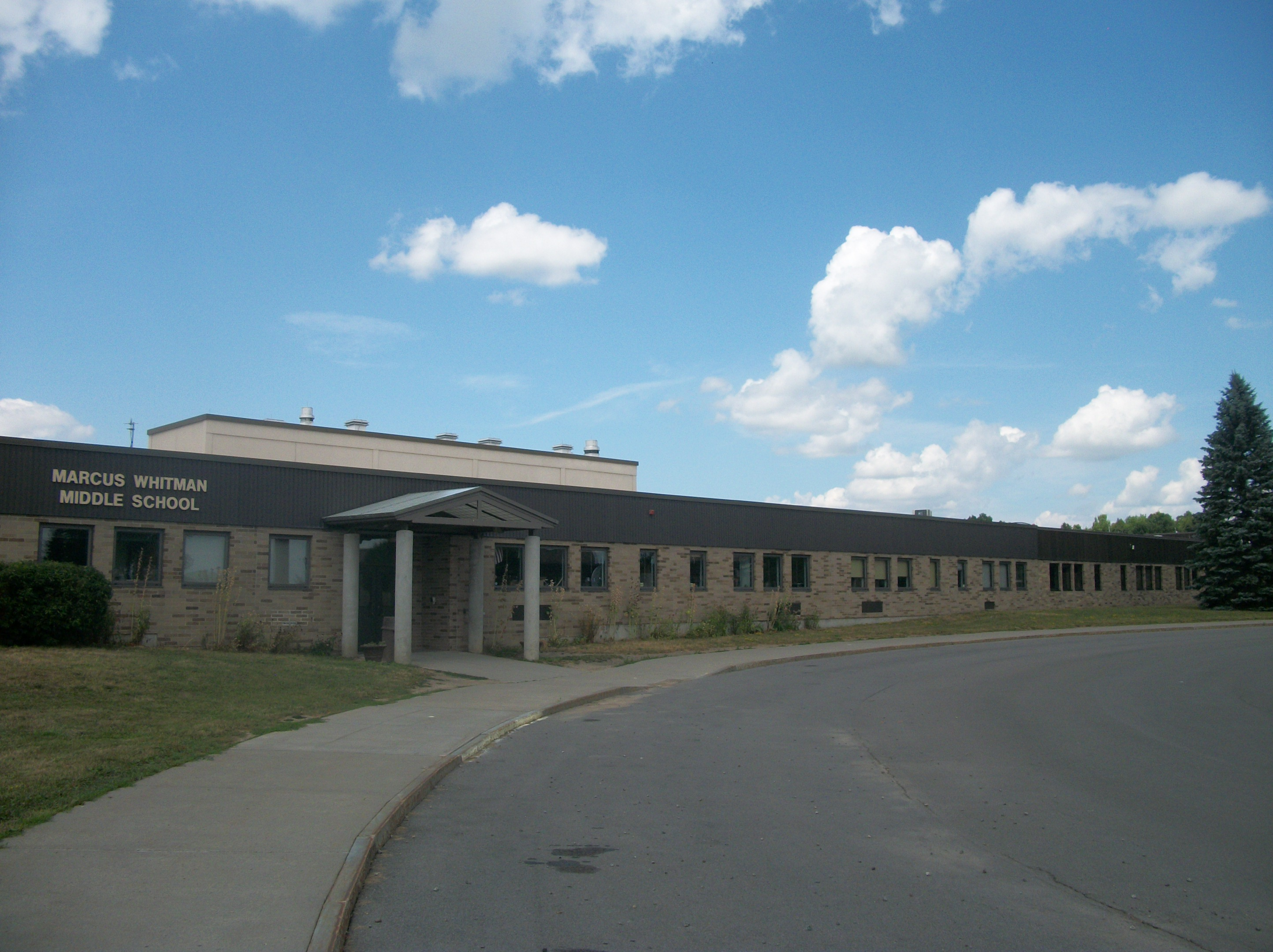

Information
- Principal: Eric Pasho
- Grades: 6–8
- Website: Marcus Whitman Middle School

Marcus Whitman Middle School is located at 4100 Baldwin Road in Rushville and serves grades 6 through 8. The current principal is Eric Pasho.

=== History ===
==== Selected former principals ====
Previous assignment and reason for departure denoted in parentheses

- James Boyle
- Henry McDougal
- Keith Eddinger–?-2002 (Guidance Counselor - Marcus Whitman High School, named Superintendent of Marcus Whitman Central District)
- William W. Rotenberg–2002-2004 (Vice Principal - Midlakes High School, named Principal of North Rose-Wolcott High School)
- Alan Degroote–2004-2007 (Social Studies teacher - Marcus Whitman High School, named Principal of Marcus Whitman High School)

== Gorham Intermediate School ==
Gorham Intermediate School
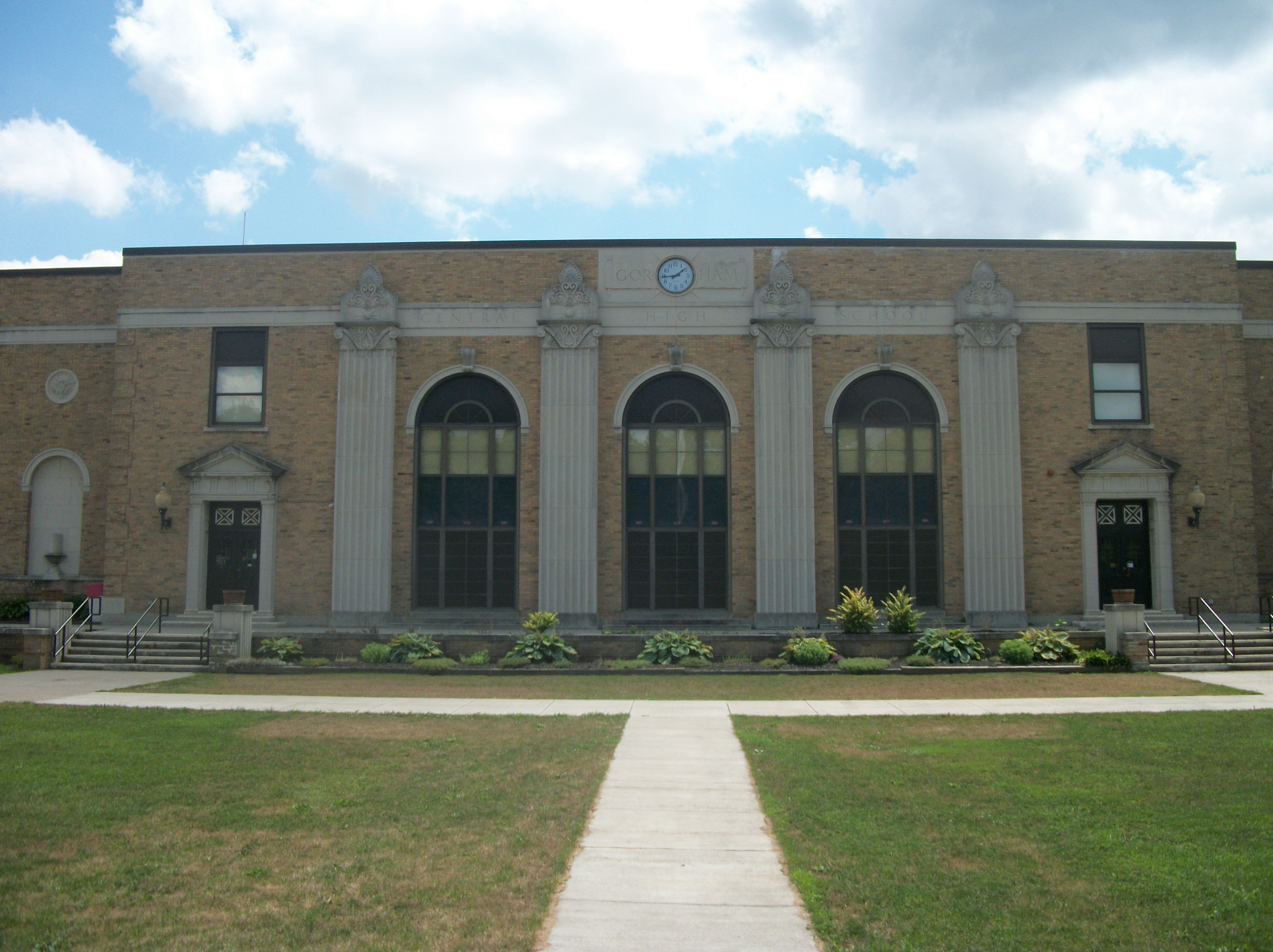

Information
- Principal: Jennifer B. Taft
- Grades: 3–5
- Website: Gorham Elementary School

Gorham Intermediate School is located at 2705 Route 245 in Stanley, New York and serves grades 3 through 5. The current principal is Jenn Taft.

=== History ===
==== Selected former principals ====
Previous assignment and reason for departure denoted in parentheses

- Eric Young
- Jacquelyn Metz–?-2004 (Unknown, retired)
- Michael L. Pullen–2004-2007 (Fourth Grade teacher - East Rochester Elementary School), named Principal of Ontario Elementary School)
- Paul J. Lahue–2007-2012 (Principal - Middlesex Valley Elementary, returned to Middlesex)

== Middlesex Valley Primary School ==
Middlesex Valley Primary School
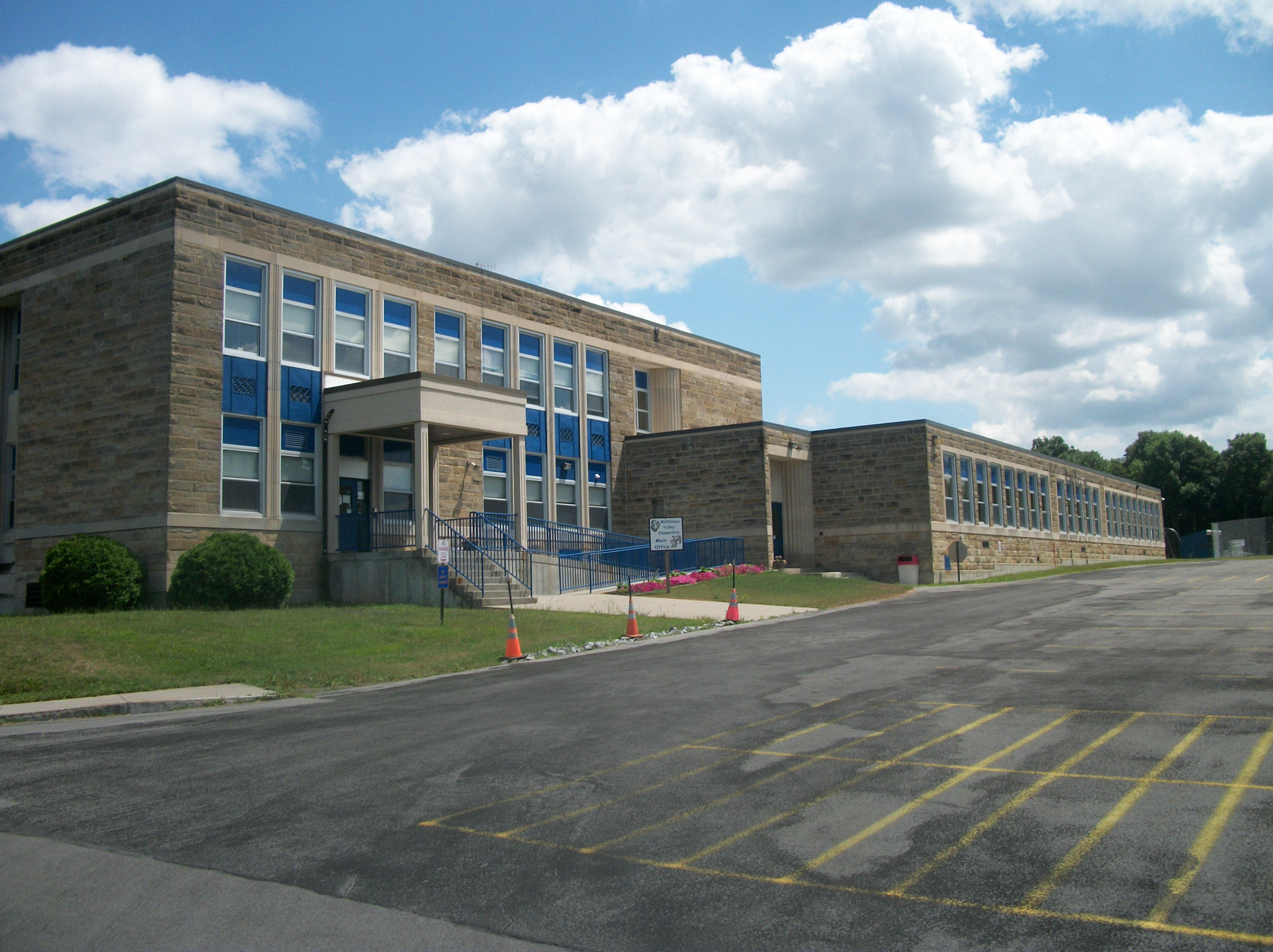

Information
- Principal: Karissa Schutt
- Grades: UPK–2
- Website: Middlesex Valley Elementary School

Middlesex Valley Primary School is located at 149 State Route 245 in Rushville and serves Grades UPK–2. The current principal is Karissa Schutt.

=== History ===
==== Selected former principals ====
- Ralph Casperson
- Cynthia Martone
- Paul Lahue–2004-2006 (Teacher - Middlesex Valley Elementary School, named principal of Gorham Elementary School)
- Susan Wissick–2006-2012 (Principal - Marcus Whitman High School, named principal of Gorham Elementary)
- Paul Lahue–2012-2014 (Principal - Gorham Elementary School, named director of athletics for Marcus Whitman Central School District)
- Dr. Bonnie Cazer–2014-2023 (Principal - Middlesex Valley Elementary School, Retired)

== Administration ==
Year	Superintendent	Middlesex Principal	Gorham Principal	Middle School Principal	High School Principal
1999–2000	Charlie Wiltse	Cynthia Martone	Jackie Metz	Keith Eddinger	Dean Duffy
2000–2001	Charlie Wiltse	Cynthia Martone	Jackie Metz	Keith Eddinger	Dean Duffy
2001–2002	Charlie Wiltse	Cynthia Martone	Jackie Metz	Keith Eddinger	Lynn Muscarella
2002–2003	Keith Eddinger	Cynthia Martone	Jackie Metz	Bill Rotenberg	Lynn Muscarella
2003–2004	Keith Eddinger	Cynthia Martone	Jackie Metz	Bill Rotenberg	Lynn Muscarella
2004–2005	Keith Eddinger	Paul Lahue	Mike Pullen	Alan Degroote	Sue Wissick
2005–2006	Oren Cook	Paul Lahue	Mike Pullen	Alan Degroote	Sue Wissick
2006–2007	Oren Cook	Sue Wissick	Paul Lahue	Alan Degroote	Mark Sissell
2007–2008	Oren Cook	Sue Wissick	Paul Lahue	Alan Degroote	Mark Sissell
2008-2009	Mike Chirco	Sue Wissick	Paul Lahue	Clay Cole	Alan Degroote
2009–2010	Mike Chirco	Sue Wissick	Paul Lahue	Clay Cole	Alan Degroote
2010–2011	Mike Chirco	Sue Wissick	Paul Lahue	Clay Cole	Alan Degroote
2011–2012	Mike Chirco	Sue Wissick	Paul Lahue	Clay Cole	Alan Degroote
2012–2013	Mike Chirco	Paul Lahue	Sue Wissick	Clay Cole	Jenn Taft
2013–2014	Jeramy Clingerman	Paul Lahue	Sue Wissick	Clay Cole	Jenn Taft
2014–2015	Jeramy Clingerman	Bonnie Cazer	Sue Wissick	Clay Cole	Jenn Taft
2015–2016	Jeramy Clingerman	Bonnie Cazer	Sue Wissick	Clay Cole	Jenn Taft
2016–2017	Jeramy Clingerman	Bonnie Cazer	Sue Wissick	Clay Cole	Jenn Taft
2017–2018	Jeramy Clingerman	Bonnie Cazer	Sue Wissick	Clay Cole	Jenn Taft
2018–2019	Jeramy Clingerman	Bonnie Cazer	Sue Wissick	Clay Cole	Jenn Taft
2019–2020	Dr. Chris Brown	Bonnie Cazer	Eric Pasho	Clay Cole	Jenn Taft
2019–2020	Dr. Chris Brown	Bonnie Cazer	Eric Pasho	Clay Cole	Jenn Taft
2020–2021	Dr. Chris Brown	Dr. Bonnie Cazer	Eric Pasho	Clay Cole	Jenn Taft
2021–2022	Dr. Chris Brown	Dr. Bonnie Cazer	Eric Pasho	Clay Cole	Jenn Taft
2022-2023	Dr. Chris Brown	Dr. Bonnie Cazer	Jenn Taft	Eric Pasho	Eric Pasho
2023-2024	Dr. Chris Brown	Karissa Schutt	Jenn Taft	Eric Pasho	Eric Pasho
