= East Irondequoit Central School District =

School district in New York, United States

- The Official EICSD Banner

Location
- 600 Pardee Rd; Rochester, NY 14609 (Headquarters built into Laurelton-Pardee Intermediate) Monroe County, New York United States
- Coordinates: 43.1873°N 77.5521°W

District information
- Type: Public
- Motto: Building a Future, One Student at a Time
- Grades: Pre-K-12 and adult education
- Established: July 1956
- Superintendent: Mary E. Grow
- Asst. superintendent(s): John Abbott (deputy)
- Accreditation: New York State Education Department
- Schools: Two primary schools (K–2); Two intermediate schools (3–5); One middle school (6–8); One senior high school (9–12)
- Budget: ▲US$86,563,388 (2021-2022)
- NCES District ID: 3609690

Students and staff
- Students: 3,600 (2014–2015)
- Student–teacher ratio: 13:1

Other information
- Unions: NYSUT, East Irondequoit Teachers' Association
- Website: www.eastiron.org

The East Irondequoit Central School District is a public school district in New York State that serves approximately 3,600 students in the eastern half of the town of Irondequoit in Monroe County. It has over 600 employees and an operating budget of $86,563,388. The average class size is 23 (K-5) and 24 (6–12) students. The student-teacher ratio is 13:1 (elementary) and 13:1 (middle-high school). Mary E. Grow is the Superintendent of Schools.

== History ==
Superintendents
Name	Tenure
Merton J. Merring	1957 – 1962
Ross J. Willink	1963 – 1969
Daniel J. Healy	1970 – 1973
Rodney Spring	1974 –
Mark Wayne	1985
Josephine S. Kehoe	1985 - 1998
Robert L. Collins	1998 – 2004
John D. Abbott	2004 - 2005
Susan K. Allen	2005 – 2018
Mary E. Grow	2019–present

== Board of education ==
Board members on the Board of Education serve rotating three-year terms. Elections are held each May for board members and to vote on the school district budget. Board members for the 2025–2026 school year are:

- Stacey Beaumont, president
- Jeffrey Petrie, vice president
- Jessica Krupa
- Kimberly Lasher
- Dan McInerney
- Jill Ricci
- Doreen Swan
- Carol Watt

== Schools ==
=== Elementary schools ===
- Helendale Road Primary School (K-2) - Principal: Jessica legere
- Ivan L. Green Primary School (K-2) - Principal: Lucas Hiley
- Durand-Eastman Intermediate School (3–5) - Principal: Timothy Roach
- Laurelton-Pardee Intermediate School (3–5) - Principal: Meghan Bello

=== Middle school ===
- East Irondequoit Middle School (6–8) -Principal: Max Zeller - assistant principal(s) - Kevin Morrissey - interim assistant principal(s) - Kelly Walker

=== High school ===
- Eastridge High School (9–12) - interim Principal: David Dunn - Assistant Principals: Sean Costello, Redia bridges, Timothy baker

== Renovations ==
During the 2006–2007 school year, the Durand-Eastman Intermediate School was being renovated. Its students were being housed at Ivan Green School (grade 3), Bishop Kearney School (grade 4) and East Irondequoit Middle School (grade 5). Now that the renovation of Durand Eastman is over, the students have returned to their "New" school. Residents of East Irondequoit Central School District voted on Tuesday, December 9, 2008, to approve the Generational Capital Project that includes construction and renovation work and purchase of buses to begin a district transportation service. There will be no tax increase for the proposed construction, however, increased taxes will be needed to pay for hiring teachers, bus drivers and maintenance for the new buses. The new district-based transportation system will reduce costs by estimated $700,000 per year, on average, through reduced expenses and new revenue. The project includes capital construction and renovation work and a district based transportation system. The proposal includes major improvements to the athletic facilities at Eastridge High School, which are more than fifty years old, along with renovation work at district elementary schools.
