= Rushawn Baker =

American football player (born 2003)

Profile
- Position: Running back

Personal information
- Born: April 17, 2003 (age 23); Farmington, New York, U.S.
- Listed height: 6 ft 0 in (1.83 m)
- Listed weight: 225 lb (102 kg)

Career information
- High school: Victor (Victor, New York)
- College: Bucknell (2021–2023); Elon (2024)
- NFL draft: 2025: undrafted

Career history
- New York Giants (2025)*; New England Patriots (2025)*; Edmonton Elks (2026)*; Montreal Alouettes (2026); Hamilton Tiger-Cats (2026)*
- * Offseason or practice squad member only
- Stats at Pro Football Reference

Rushawn Rolando Baker (born April 17, 2003) is an American professional football running back. He played college football for Bucknell and Elon. Baker has also been a member of the New York Giants and New England Patriots.

== College career ==
Baker played college football for Bucknell from 2021 to 2023 and Elon in 2024. He played in 30 games for Bucknell, rushing for 1,359 yards and 15 touchdowns. For his senior year, Baker transferred to Elon, where in 12 games, he rushed for 859 yards and nine touchdowns. He earned an All-CAA honorable mention after finishing the season with 583 rushing yards in the last four games.

== Professional career ==
Pre-draft measurables
Height	Weight	Arm length	Hand span	40-yard dash	10-yard split	20-yard split	20-yard shuttle	Three-cone drill	Vertical jump	Broad jump	Bench press
5 ft 10 7/8 in (1.80 m)	218 lb (99 kg)	32 1/4 in (0.82 m)	9 3/4 in (0.25 m)	4.52 s	1.52 s	2.56 s	4.51 s	7.07 s	38.5 in (0.98 m)	10 ft 0 in (3.05 m)	21 reps
All values from Pro Day

=== New York Giants ===
After not being selected in the 2025 NFL draft, Baker signed with the New York Giants as an undrafted free agent. He was released as waived/injured on August 4, 2025.

=== New England Patriots ===
On October 28, 2025, Baker was signed to the New England Patriots practice squad. He was released on November 28.

=== Edmonton Elks ===
On April 24, 2026, Baker signed with the Edmonton Elks of the Canadian Football League (CFL). He was released on May 31 as part of final roster cuts.

=== Montreal Alouettes ===
On July 13, 2026, Baker signed with the Montreal Alouettes. He was released on August 23.

=== Hamilton Tiger-Cats ===
On September 12, 2026, Baker signed with the Hamilton Tiger-Cats practice roster. On October 10, he was released.

== Career statistics ==
Legend
**Bold**	Career high

Year	Team	Games		Rushing				Receiving			
Year	Team	GP	GS	Att	Yds	Avg	TD	Rec	Yds	Avg	TD
2021	Bucknell	10	2	63	235	3.7	1	2	11	5.5	0
2022	Bucknell	11	**7**	154	646	4.2	7	**14**	66	4.7	**2**
2023	Bucknell	9	4	118	478	4.1	7	10	**99**	**9.9**	0
2024	Elon	**12**	5	**183**	**859**	**4.7**	**9**	8	48	6.0	0
Career		42	18	518	2,218	52.8	24	34	224	6.6	2
