= Wheatland–Chili Central School District =

School district in New York, United States

Address
- 13 Beckwith Avenue Scottsville, New York, 14546; United States

District information
- Type: Public
- Grades: PreK–12
- NCES District ID: 3631170

Students and staff
- Students: 656 (2020–2021)
- Teachers: 73.73 (on an FTE basis)
- Staff: 86.4 (on an FTE basis)
- Student–teacher ratio: 8.9:1

Other information
- Website: www.wheatlandchili.org

The Wheatland–Chili Central School District in Scottsville, NY serves approximately 700 students in the village of Scottsville and portions of the towns of Chili, Wheatland, and Brighton in Monroe County and a portion of the town of Caledonia in Livingston County, with over 160 employees. It is the smallest school district in Monroe County.

Founded in 1955, the District celebrated 50 Years of Learning in 2005.

The average class size is 17-19 students, the average grade size is approximately 60 students and the student-teacher ratio is 13:1(elementary), 13:1(middle-high school).

The District motto is "Personalized Education...Powerful Results".

Stephen Kenny is the Superintendent of Schools.

== Board of education ==
The Board of Education (BOE) consists of 7 members who serve rotating 3-year terms. Elections are held each May for board members and to vote on the School District Budget.

== Schools ==
=== Elementary school ===
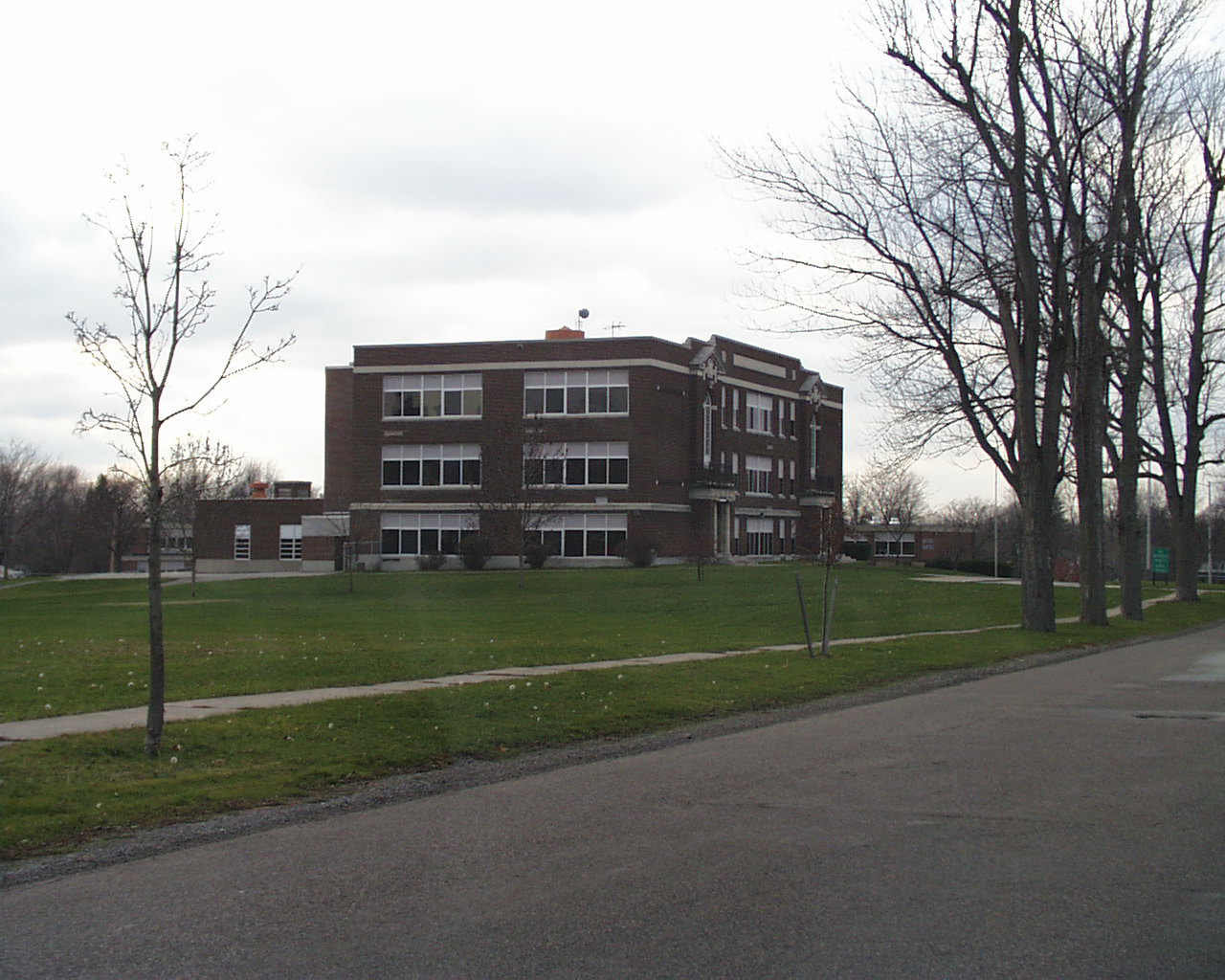
Elementary School

- TJ Connor Elementary School (K-5)

Daniel Murray, Ed.D Principal
13 Beckwith Ave. Scottsville, NY 14546

=== Middle school ===
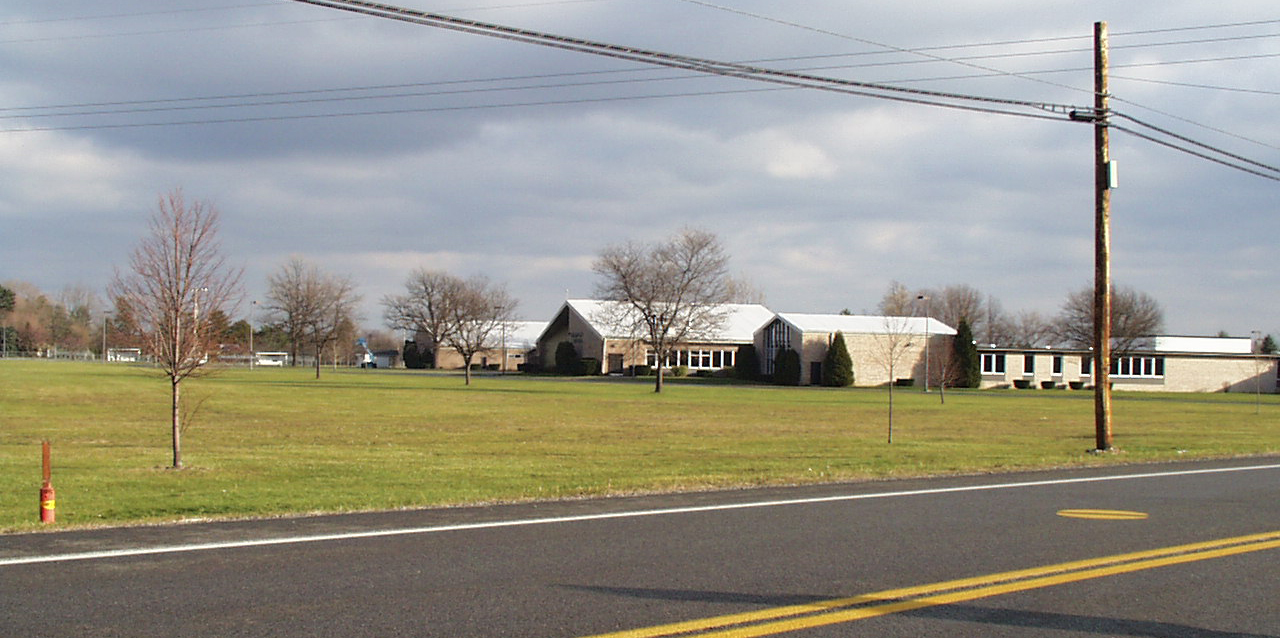
High School

- Wheatland-Chili Middle School (6-8)

Camille Zitz, Principal
940 North Rd, Scottsville, NY 14546

=== High school ===
- Wheatland-Chili High School (9-12)

Camille Zitz, Principal
940 North Rd., Scottsville, NY 14546

The school mascot was the Scotsmen until the 1990s, after which a new mascot was chosen. They have since been called the Wheatland-Chili Wildcats.

=== Alumni ===
Name	Known For	Relationship to Wheatland-Chili Central School
Brennan Swain	Amazing Race Season 1 Winner/ Actor	1989 Valedictorian

Theodore McKee A Senior Circuit Court Judge, Class of 1965
