= Eastridge High School =

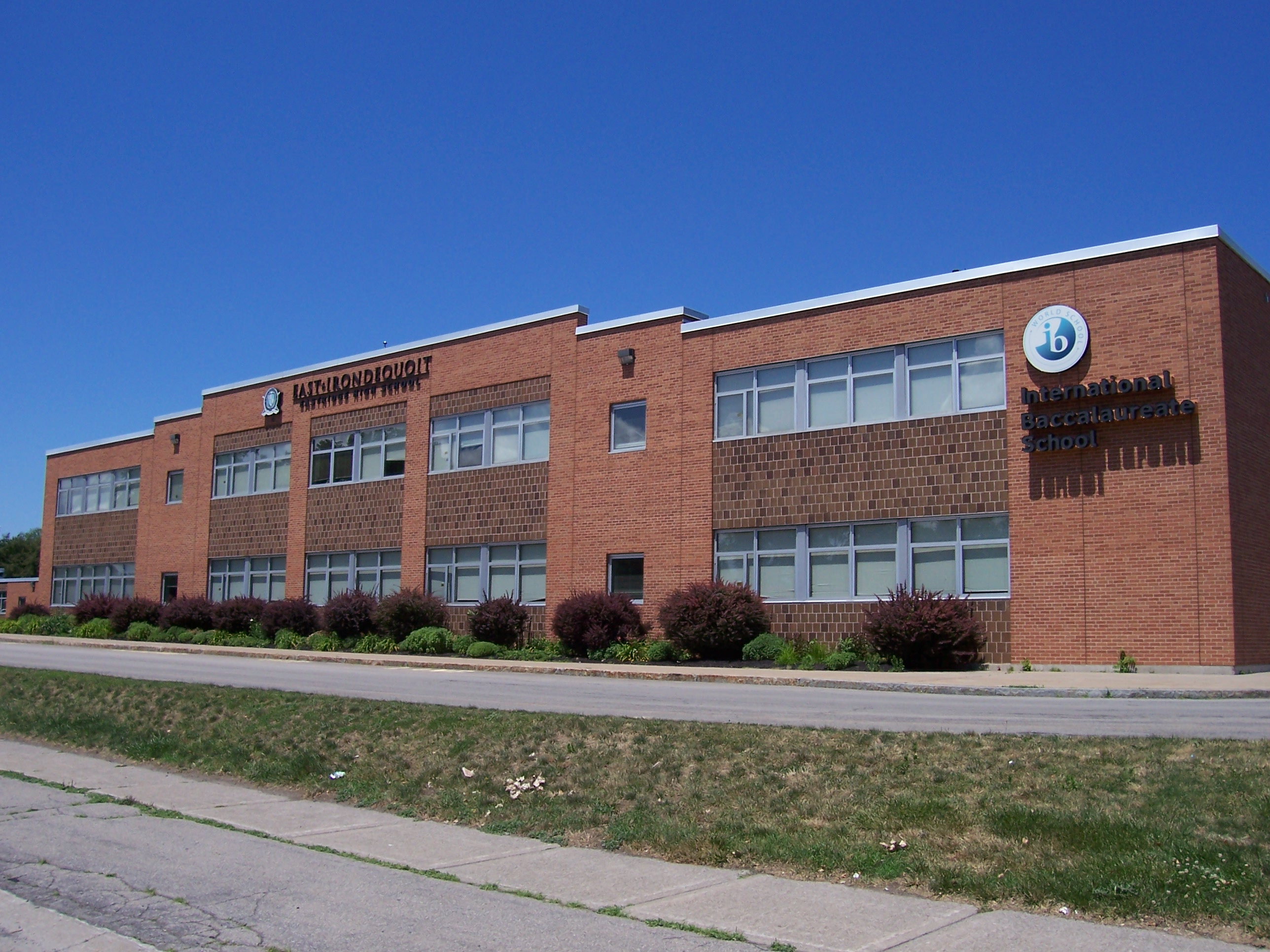
- Eastridge High School in 2012

Location
- 2350 East Ridge Road; Rochester, Monroe, New York 14622; United States; 43°12′18″N 77°33′15″W

Information
- School type: Public secondary school Public
- Motto: "Work as One Knight"
- Established: 1957
- School district: East Irondequoit Central School District
- Superintendent: Mary E. Grow
- CEEB code: 334797
- Principal: John Gammon
- Staff: 87.91 (FTE)
- Grades: 9 through 12
- Enrollment: 884 (2023-2024)
- Average class size: 30
- Student to teacher ratio: 10.06
- Language: English
- Hours in school day: 7
- Campus: Suburban
- Colors: Navy Blue, Columbia Blue and White
- Sports: Baseball, Basketball, Bowling, Cheer, Cross country, Football, Golf, Ice hockey, Indoor track and field, Lacrosse, Swimming, Tennis, Track and field, Volleyball, and Wrestling
- Nickname: Lancers
- Website: www.eastiron.org/o/eh

Eastridge High School is an American public high school located in Irondequoit, New York. The school is an IB (International Baccalaureate) world school and also offers AP classes. Its current principal is John Gammon. This is the only high school in the East Irondequoit Central School District. The school also features a robotics team, marching band, indoor percussion ensemble and drama club for yearly shows. On May 7, 2015, Eastridge High School was named one of ten schools chosen as a School of Opportunity by the National Education Policy Center (NEPC). More than 80 schools applied and four were awarded “Gold Recognition” and six earned “Silver Recognition”. Eastridge is one of the schools awarded Silver Recognition.

As of the 2025-2026 school year, the school offers many sports, including: baseball, basketball, bowling, cheer, cross country, football, flag football, golf, ice hockey, field hockey, indoor track and field, lacrosse, swimming, tennis, track and field, volleyball, and wrestling.

As of the 2025-2026 school year, Eastridge offers numerous clubs, such as: art, chess, class officers, ecology, Envirothon, e-sports, fall play, fitness, Gay/Straight Alliance, international, interscholastic and intramural, IT student help desk, jazz ensemble, Lancers Lend a Hand, Link Crew, Languages Other Than English, marching band, math league, National Honor Society, The Phoenix, Parent-Teacher-Student Association, Red Cross, ROC 2 Change, ski, slam poetry, spring musical, stage crew, step team, strategy war game, student government, student council, tabletop gaming, varsity, and yearbook.

== Band and indoor percussion ==
The East Irondequoit Lancer Marching Band has won six state championships over 35 years in the New York State Field Band Conference, in 1985, 1992, 1993, 1994, 1998, and 1999.

== Notable alumni ==
- Steve Gadd, jazz drummer
- Joseph Morelle, U.S. Congressman
- Laureen Oliver, co-founder of the Independence Party of New York
