= Central Square School District =

School district in New York, United States

Central Square Central School District

Location
- 44 School Drive Central Square, Oswego County, New York, 13036; United States
- Coordinates: 43°17′06″N 76°08′42″W

District information
- Type: Public
- Motto: "As one we rise, together we soar"
- Grades: UPK-12
- Established: 1944
- President: Randy Hoyt
- Superintendent: Mr. Thomas J. Colabufo
- Asst. superintendent(s): Miss Concetta Galvan
- Schools: 6
- Budget: $71,338,000 (2008-2009 school year)
- NCES District ID: 3606900.

Students and staff
- Students: 4,519
- Teachers: 315.19 (on an FTE basis)
- Student–teacher ratio: 14.34

Other information
- Website: cssd.org

Central Square Central School District is a school district centered in Oswego County, New York. The Superintendent of Schools is Mr. Thomas J. Colabufo. The Board of Education President is Andrew M. Martin II. School colors are maroon and white.

The district is composed of communities in parts of three counties. The district is based in Oswego County, New York, and includes all of the towns of Hastings, West Monroe, and Constantia, plus parts of the towns of Palermo, Mexico, and Parish. Portions of the Onondaga County, New York towns of Cicero and Clay and the Oneida County, New York town of Vienna are also part of the district. The villages of Central Square and Cleveland, plus the hamlets of Brewerton, Bernhards Bay, and Mallory lie within the district.

The district formerly operated its district office located at 642 S. Main Street, in the Village of Central Square, and operations have since been dispersed across the district when it was decided to close the building by the end of the 2016–2017 school year. In 1926, the former district office was the site of the original Central Square High School facility. In 1993, Central Square Middle School was constructed, incorporating a Transportation Center. This facility houses all of the districts vehicles including 85 school buses, 10 maintenance vehicles, and numerous specialty vehicles. Central Square Schools employs over 700 full-time staff members, including teachers, teaching assistants, bus drivers, and administrative staff.

The Central Square School District is more than 200 square miles in size, making it the largest school district by land size alone in the state of New York, and the largest public school district in the region.

== Schools ==
The schools served by the district are:

- Aura A. Cole Elementary School (K-5)
- Brewerton Elementary School (K-5)
- Central Square Middle School (6–8)
- Hastings-Mallory Elementary School (K-5)
- Millard Hawk Elementary School (K-5)
- Paul V. Moore High School (9–12)

=== Former ===
- Cleveland Elementary School (K-5) closed on July 1, 2014.
- Central Square Intermediate School (3–5) closed on July 1, 2017
