= New Hartford Central School District =

School district in New York, United States

New Hartford Central School District is a school district in Oneida County, New York.

It includes the majority of the Town of New Hartford plus portions of the Town of Kirkland and the Town of Paris. The district includes the Village of New Hartford and the Washington Mills census-designated place. Additionally, the district extends into Herkimer County, where it includes a section of the Town of Frankfort.

== History ==
In 2016, the border between the Utica City School District and New Hartford Central School District was identified by the non-profit EdBuild as the 12th most segregating school district borders in the United States.

Robert Nole became superintendent in 2008, and was in that capacity until April 2021. The board of trustees expressed support for and positive reception of Nole.

Cosimo Tangorra Jr. became superintendent in July 2021. In June 2024, Tangorra stated that he would resign on March 4, 2025 so he could begin retirement. After Cosimo Tangorra Jr. retired, Joseph Barretta served as acting superintendent until Joseph D'Apice, superintendent of Mount Markham Central School District, became the new superintendent on April 28, 2025.

== Schools ==
Elementary schools

- Bradley Elementary School
- E.R. Hughes Elementary School
- Robert E. Myles Elementary School

Secondary schools

- Ralph W. Perry Junior High School
- New Hartford Senior High School
