= Phoenix Central School District =

School district in the U.S. state of New York

Address
- 116 Volney Street Phoenix, New York; United States
- Coordinates: 43°14′24″N 76°17′56″W

District information
- Type: Public
- Grades: PreK–12
- Superintendent: Christopher Byrne
- NCES District ID: 3622920

Students and staff
- Students: 1,879 (2013–14)
- Faculty: 163.87 (on FTE basis)
- Student–teacher ratio: 11.47:1
- District mascot: Firebirds

Other information
- Website: www.phoenixcsd.org

Phoenix Central School District (Phoenix CSD) is a K–12 public school district in the Town of Schroeppel in Central New York. The district educates about 1,900 students.

== Schools ==
- John C. Birdlebough High School (9-12)
- Emerson J. Dillon Middle School (5-8)
- Michael A. Maroun Elementary School (K-4)
