= Victor Central School District =

School district in New York, United States

Address
- 953 High St. Victor, Ontario County, New York, 14564; United States

District information
- Type: Public
- Motto: Respecting diversity and cultivating kindness
- Grades: K–12
- Superintendent: Dr. Timothy Terranova, Ed.D.

Students and staff
- Staff: 475
- District mascot: The Blue Devils
- Colors: Blue and Gold

Other information
- Website: www.victorschools.org

The Victor Central School District is a public school district in New York State that serves approximately 4,500 students in the Village of Victor and portions of the towns of Farmington and Victor in Ontario County; portions of the town of Perinton in Monroe County; and portions of the town of Macedon in Wayne County, with an operating budget of approximately $64 million (~$9,884 per student in 2004). The average class size is 24 students (all grades), as of 2006. The student-teacher ratio is 14-15:1(elementary), 13-14:1(middle-high school). As of 2018, there are a total of 475 staff members.

== Superintendent ==
Timothy Terranova is the Superintendent of Schools, as of February 13, 2020.

== Board of education ==
The Board of Education (BOE) consists of 7 members who serve rotating 3-year terms. Elections for board members are held each year in May, along with a vote on the budget.

The current board members are:

- Tim DeLucia, President
- Christopher Parks, Vice President
- Lisa Kostecki
- Kristin Elliott
- Debbie Palumbo-Sanders
- Elizabeth Mitchell
- Trisha Turner

== Schools ==
All of the District's schools are located on a 166-acre (0.67 km^{2}) campus, which consists of four buildings surrounded by various athletic fields and playgrounds.

Although the Junior and Senior High Schools are physically the same building, they are considered separate in most other aspects.

=== Elementary schools ===
- Victor Early Childhood School (K-1)

Principal: Robert DeRose

- Victor Primary School (2-3 and K-3 Multiage)

Principal: Heidi Robb

- Victor Intermediate School (4-6)

Principal: James Mauro

=== Middle school ===
- Victor Junior High School (7-8)

Principal: Brian D. Gee

=== High school ===
- Victor Senior High School (9-12)

Principal: Brian Siesto

== Performance ==
The District's 86% graduation rate exceeds the State Standard of 55%.

For the past 12 years, the New York State Education Department (NYSED) has named the Junior High School a New York State high performing school in addition to a "School to Watch". In 2013, the NYSED named the Junior and Senior High Schools "Reward Schools" in the "High Performance" category. 98% of students from the class of 2018 graduated with a Regents Diploma, while 63% earned the higher Regents Diploma with Advanced Designation. In addition, a total of 99 students were inducted into the National Honor Society that same year.

== School buses and transportation ==
- The District employs a fleet of 78-passenger Blue Bird Puller style buses, as well as ten "short" buses and five, eight-passenger vans. The District runs on a 100,000-mile or 10-year rotation of buses, and will generally buy five new buses per year, in accordance with the budget.
- Every month, all of the buses are inspected by the New York State Department of Transportation.
