= Medina High School (New York) =

Location
- 2 Mustang Dr; Medina, New York 14103; United States
- Coordinates: 43.2097°N 78.3962°W

Information
- Type: Public
- School district: Medina Central School District
- NCES School ID: 361896001716
- Principal: Michael Cavanagh
- Teaching staff: 56.75 (on an FTE basis)
- Grades: 7-12
- Enrollment: 609 (2023-2024)
- Student to teacher ratio: 10.73
- Campus: Rural: Distant
- Color(s): Red, Blue and White
- Mascot: Mustangs
- Yearbook: Mirror
- Website: www.medinacsd.org/Domain/175

Medina High School is a public high school in Medina, New York, United States. It is a part of the Medina Central School District.

== Sports ==
Medina's athletic teams are nicknamed the Mustangs and the school's colors are red, blue and white. Medina teams compete in the following sports:

- Baseball
- Boys & girls basketball
- Boys & girls cross country
- Football
- Boys & girls golf
- Boys & girls lacrosse
- Boys & girls soccer
- Boys & girls swimming
- Boys & girls track & field
- Volleyball
- Wrestling
- Softball
- Field hockey

== Demographics ==
79% of the student population at Medina High School identify as caucasian, 9% identify as multiracial, 7% identify as Hispanic, 4% identify as African American, 0.5% identity as American Indian/Alaskin Native, 0.2% identify as Asian, and 0.2% identify as Hawaiian Native/Pacific Islander. The student body makeup is 49% male and 51% female.
