= Marcus Whitman Middle/High School =

Location
- 4100 Baldwin Rd; Rushville, New York 14454; United States; 42°46′45″N 77°13′25″W

Information
- Type: Public
- School district: Marcus Whitman Central School District
- NCES School ID: 361230000993
- Principal: Eric Pasho
- Teaching staff: 34.72 (on an FTE basis)
- Grades: 9-12
- Enrollment: 323 (2023-2024)
- Student to teacher ratio: 9.30
- Campus: Rural
- Colors: Blue and Gold
- Mascot: Wildcat
- Yearbook: Nundawagan
- Website: www.mwcsd.org/schools/high-school

Marcus Whitman High School is a middle/high-school located in Rushville, New York. It is part of the Marcus Whitman Central School District. The school was named after Marcus Whitman, the famous missionary and physician. The middle and high schools are both connected as part of the same building. Also located on the campus is the BOCES building for Wayne Finger Lakes BOCES, which is right next to the school building. Marcus Whitman is a rural school district, meaning its district includes many small towns and their outlying areas. It ranks second among school districts in New York for total area.

== History ==
Marcus Whitman Middle/High School was built in 1970, and was completed in 1971. The first graduating class was the class of '72.

In 2002, a large addition was built to the school which was to be the middle school. 2003 was the first year in which classes were held in the new building. With this setup, the schools are still connected, but are a little less integrated.

Also in 2002, a significant addition was made to the BOCES building.

== Athletics ==
The school has an athletics program that is much the same as any other school. The teams are referred to as the Wildcats, or the Whitman Wildcats. The school colors are blue and gold.

== Water tower ==
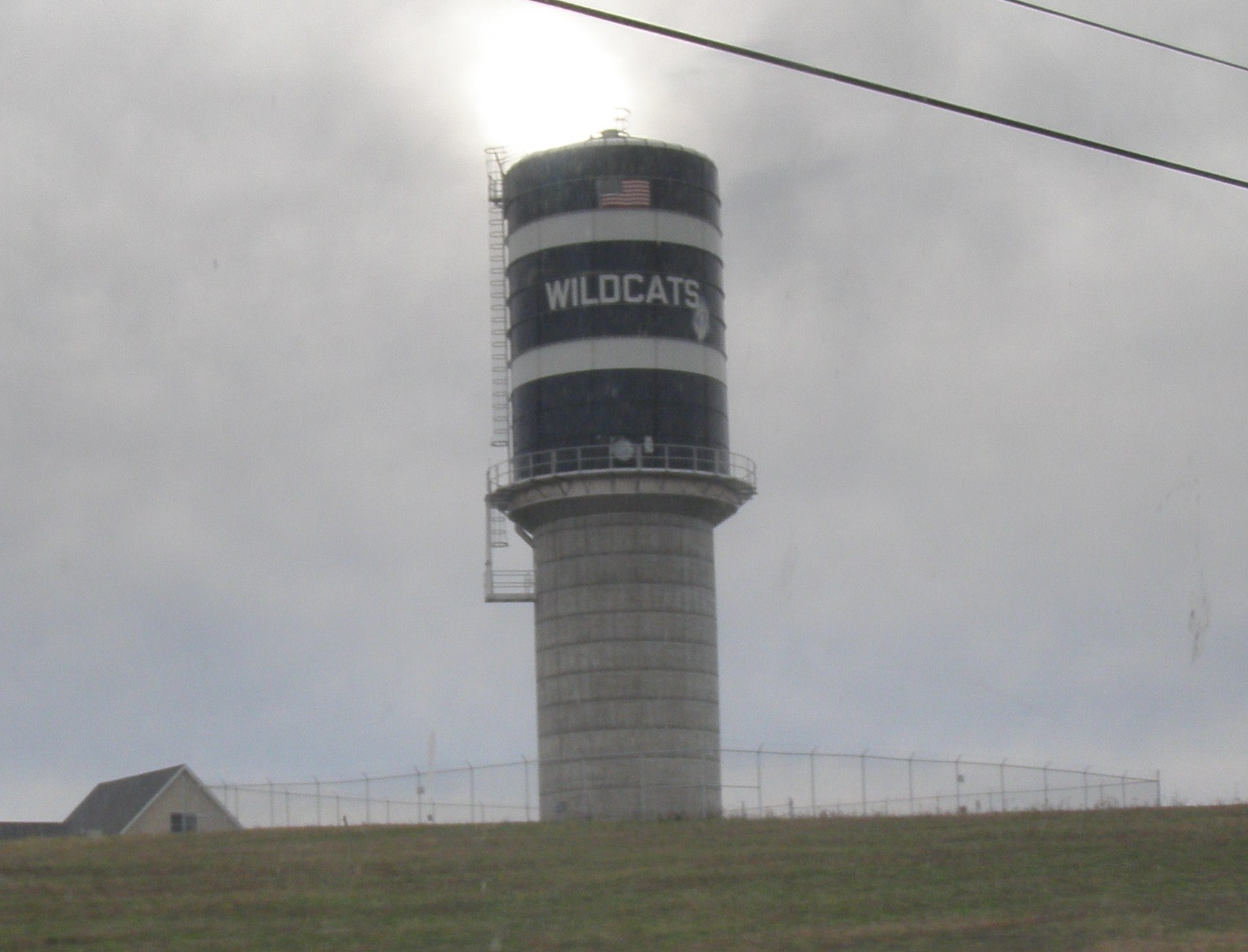
Water tower

Marcus Whitman Middle/High School is located on the top of a hill, hence the water pressure is not the best. For this reason, it was decided that a water tower should be built so that school can remain in session should the power fail, and so that more water could easily be provided in the event of a fire.

The water tower consists of blue and white steel silo sections on top of a concrete base. On the side the word "WILDCATS" is painted, referring to the mascot of the school.

The project met significant resistance among people in the area for cosmetic reasons and for the cost of the project.

== Justin Bieber show ==
On April 15, 2010, Canadian singer Justin Bieber put on a private show at the Marcus Whitman High School gymnasium as the prize for winning a fundraising contest put on by 98PXY. Whitman collected over $3,000 in pennies for the Hillside Family of Agencies. In 2009, Whitman came in second place when a concert by Donnie Klang was the prize. Justin Bieber arrived at the school 2 hours late. The 10-minute concert was held on April 15, 2010.

On April 12, 2011, Marcus Whitman High School won the 98PXY High School Challenge again, this time earning a concert by the band The Ready Set. The Ready Set played for approximately 30 minutes. The date of the concert coincided with the release of a new single by the band, which was one of the songs played during the concert.
