= Medina Central School District =

School district in New York, United States

Address
- 1 Mustang Drive Medina, New York, 14103; United States

District information
- Type: Public
- Grades: PreK–12
- NCES District ID: 3618960

Students and staff
- Students: 1,447 (2020–2021)
- Teachers: 136.11 (on an FTE basis)
- Staff: 169.89 (on an FTE basis)
- Student–teacher ratio: 10.63:1

Other information
- Website: www.medinacsd.org

Medina Central School District is a public school district that serves the village of Medina, NY as well as the towns of Ridgeway, Shelby, a small part of Barre, and a small part of Hartland which is in Niagara County. The school district consists of 1,550 students in grades PK–12. PK–3 are taught at Oak Orchard Primary School. 4–6 are taught at Clifford H. Wise Intermediate School. 7–12 are taught at Medina Junior-Senior High School. The school district is home to the Medina Mustang Marching Band, who has won fifteen state field band championships, with the most recent being in 2021. The Mustang Band has been asked to participate in Macy's Thanksgiving Day Parade and at Disney World.

Dr. Mark B. Kruzynski is superintendent.

== Board of education ==
The board is made up of seven members. Current board members are:

- Alissa Mitchell, President
- LuAnn Tierney, Vice President
- Jennifer Buondonno
- Scott Robinson
- Annette Allis
- Dr. Steven Blount
- Donnell Holloway

== Schools ==
- Oak Orchard Elementary School (PreK-2), Principal - Jennifer Stearns
- Clifford H. Wise Intermediate/Middle School (3-6), Principal - Christopher Hughes
- Medina High School (7-12), Principal - Michael Cavanagh, Assistant Principal - Mollie Mark

== Sports ==
The Mustangs compete in the Niagara-Orleans League and in Class B of Section 6 in the NYSPHSAA.

- Fall:
  - Football (Modified, Varsity)
  - Golf (Varsity)
  - Boys' Soccer (Modified, JV, Varsity)
  - Girls' Soccer (Varsity)
  - Boys' Cross Country (Modified, Varsity)
  - Girls' Cross Country (Modified, Varsity)
  - Girls' Volleyball (Modified, JV, Varsity)
  - Field Hockey (Modified, Varsity)
  - Cheerleading
- Winter:
  - Wrestling
  - Boys' Basketball (Modified, JV, Varsity)
  - Girls' Basketball (Modified, JV, Varsity)
  - Boys' Swimming (Modified, Varsity)
  - Girls' Swimming (Modified, Varsity)
  - Cheerleading
- Spring:
  - Lacrosse (Modified, JV, Varsity)
  - Baseball (JV, Varsity)
  - Softball (JV, Varsity)
  - Boys' Track and Field (Modified, Varsity)
  - Girls' Track and Field (Modified, Varsity)
  - Tennis (Varsity)
