= Jordan-Elbridge High School =

Location
- 5721 Hamilton Rd; Jordan, New York 13080; United States
- Coordinates: 43.0474°N 76.47262°W

Information
- Type: Public
- School district: Jordan-Elbridge Central School District
- NCES School ID: 361599001386
- Principal: Mark Schermerhorn
- Teaching staff: 36.05 (on an FTE basis)
- Grades: 9-12
- Enrollment: 326 (2023-2024)
- Student to teacher ratio: 9.04
- Campus: Rural: Distant
- Color(s): Blue and White
- Mascot: Eagles
- Yearbook: Per Annos
- Website: www.jecsd.org/highschool

Jordan-Elbridge High School is a high school located in Jordan, New York. It is part of the Jordan-Elbridge Central School District.
