= List of New York Yankees first-round draft picks =

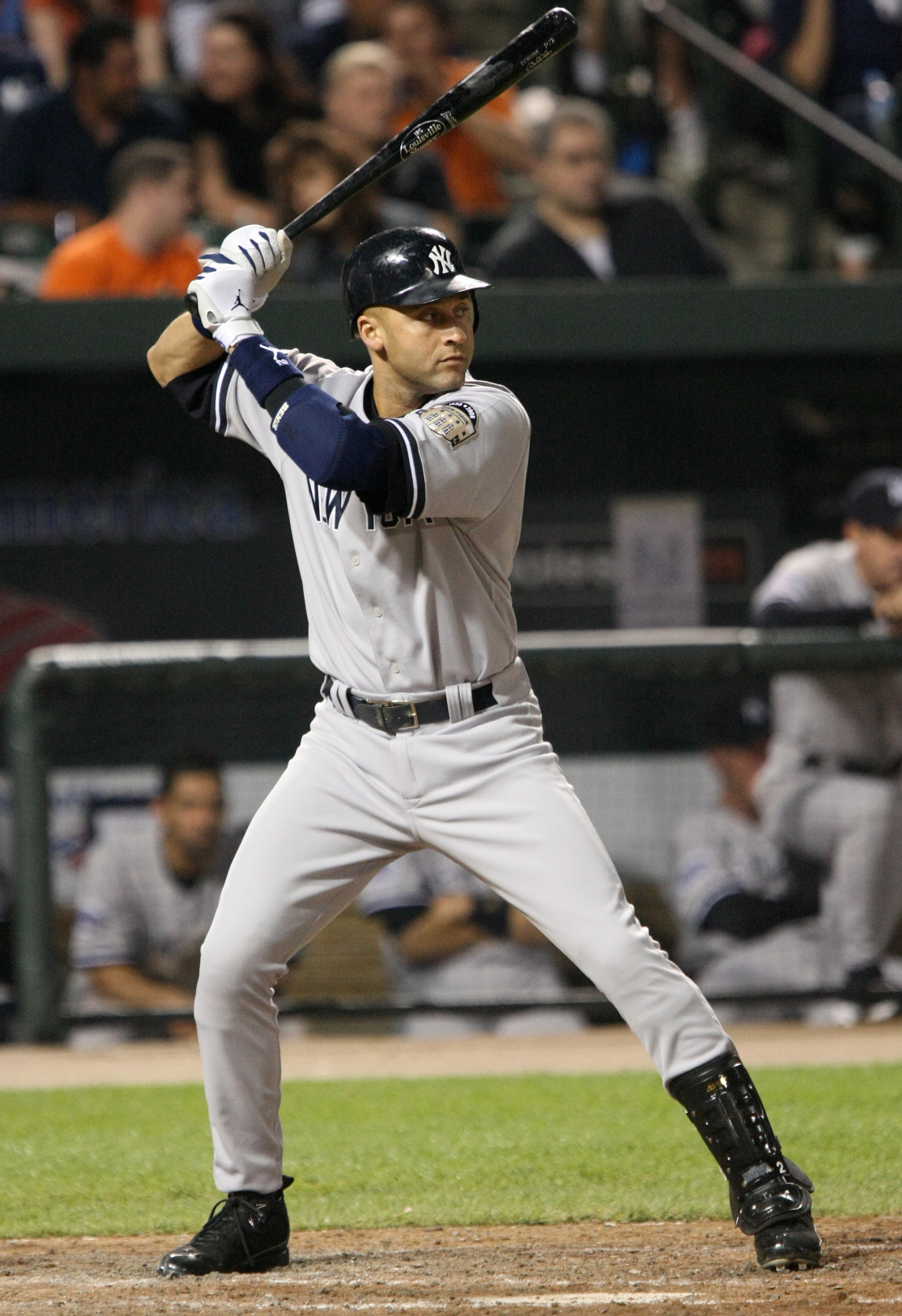
Derek Jeter (1992) has won five World Series titles with the New York Yankees, and was the Rookie of the Year in 1996.

The New York Yankees are a Major League Baseball (MLB) franchise based in The Bronx, New York. They play in the American League East division. Since the institution of Major League Baseball's Rule 4 Draft, the Yankees have selected 46 players in the first round. Officially known as the "First-Year Player Draft", the Rule 4 Draft is Major League Baseball's primary mechanism for assigning amateur baseball players from high schools, colleges, and other amateur baseball clubs to its teams. The draft order is determined based on the previous season's standings, with the team possessing the worst record receiving the first pick. In addition, teams which lost free agents in the previous off-season may be awarded compensatory or supplementary picks.

Of the 48 players the Yankees have selected in the first round, 23 were pitchers. Of these, 18 were right-handed and 5 were left-handed. The Yankees have drafted ten outfielders, six shortstops, three catchers, three first basemen, and three third basemen. The team has never drafted a player at second base. The Yankees drafted 29 players out of high school, and drafted 18 players out of college. Eleven of the players came from high schools or colleges in the state of California, and Florida follows with five players.

Four first-round picks have won championships with the franchise: Thurman Munson (1977 and 1978), Derek Jeter (1996, 1998, 1999, 2000 and 2009), Phil Hughes (2009), and Joba Chamberlain (2009). Munson and Jeter have both also served as team captains for the Yankees. Derek Jeter is the only one of the Yankees' first-round picks to have been elected to the Baseball Hall of Fame. Two of the Yankees' picks have won the MLB Rookie of the Year award; Munson won the award in 1970, and Jeter won the award in 1996.

The Yankees have made 11 selections in the supplemental round of the draft and 19 compensatory picks since the institution of the First-Year Player Draft in 1965. These additional picks are provided when a team loses a particularly valuable free agent in the previous off-season,^{[V]} or, more recently, if a team fails to sign a draft pick from the previous year. The Yankees have been awarded compensatory draft choices for failing to sign first round picks Tyrell Godwin (1997) and Gerrit Cole (2008). Though the Yankees also failed to sign Mark Prior (1998), they were not awarded a compensatory pick, as Prior was chosen with the pick received for Godwin, and compensatory rules only allow for one compensation pick for failing to sign a player. The Yankees have also surrendered 10 first round picks due to free agent signings.

== Key ==
Year	Each year links to an article about that year's Major League Baseball draft.
Position	Indicates the secondary/collegiate position at which the player was drafted, rather than the professional position the player may have gone on to play
Pick	Indicates the number of the pick within the first round
†	Member of the National Baseball Hall of Fame
*	Player did not sign with the Yankees
§	Indicates a supplemental pick

== Picks ==
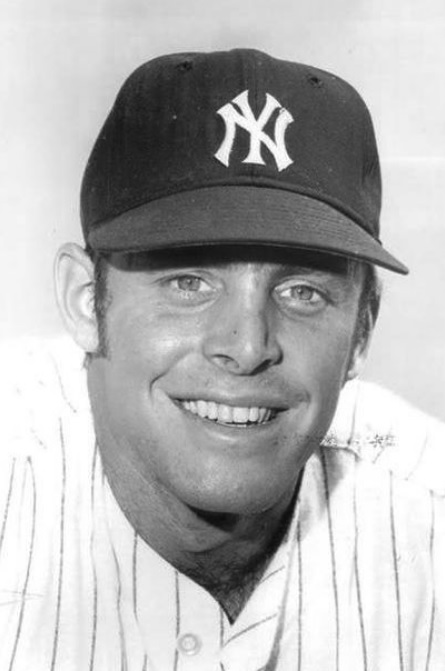
Ron Blomberg (1967) was the team's first first-overall draft pick.

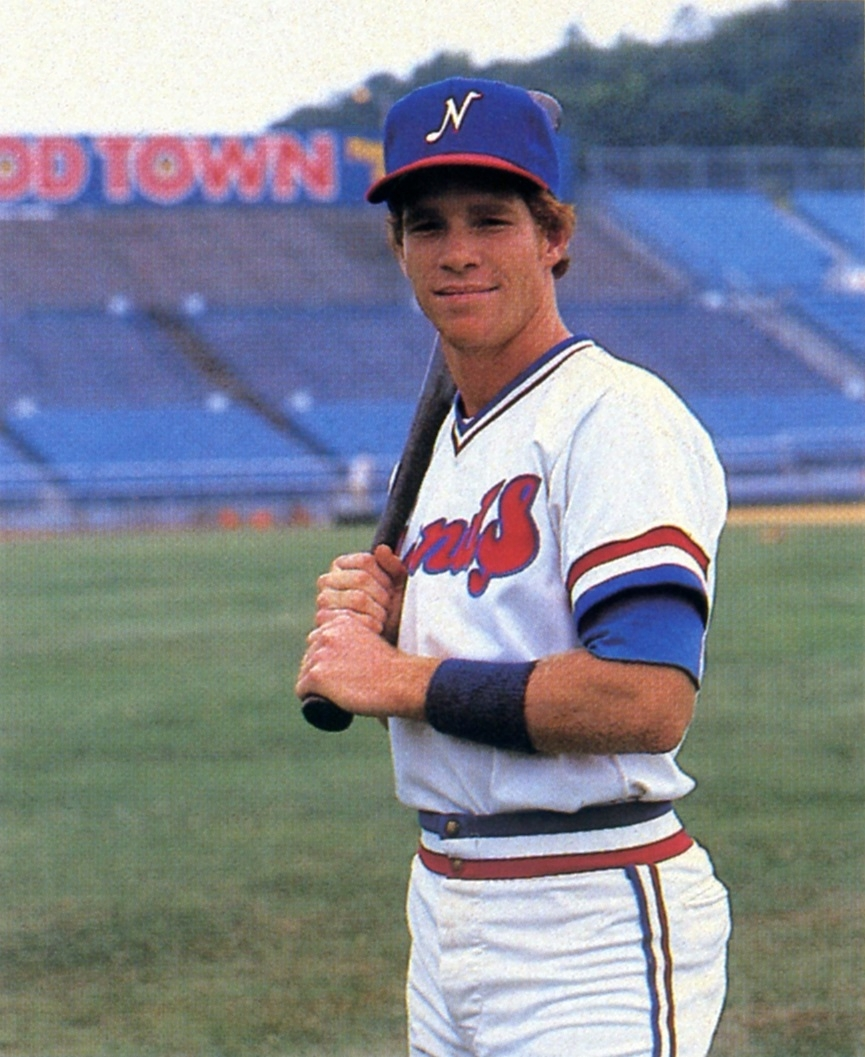
Rex Hudler (1978) was selected with the first compensatory draft pick in league history.

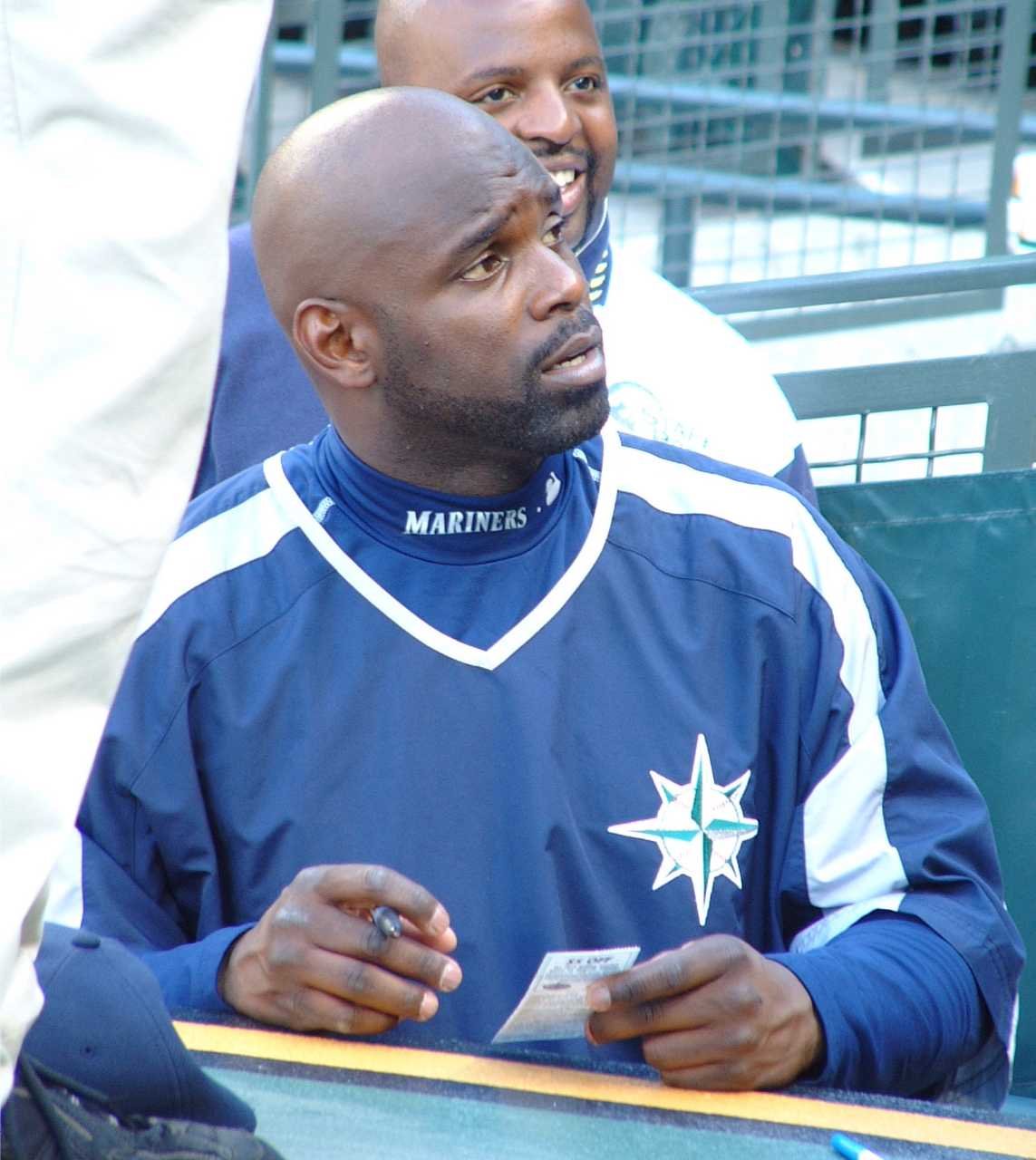
Carl Everett (1990) was the first player drafted by the Yankees in the first round since 1985.

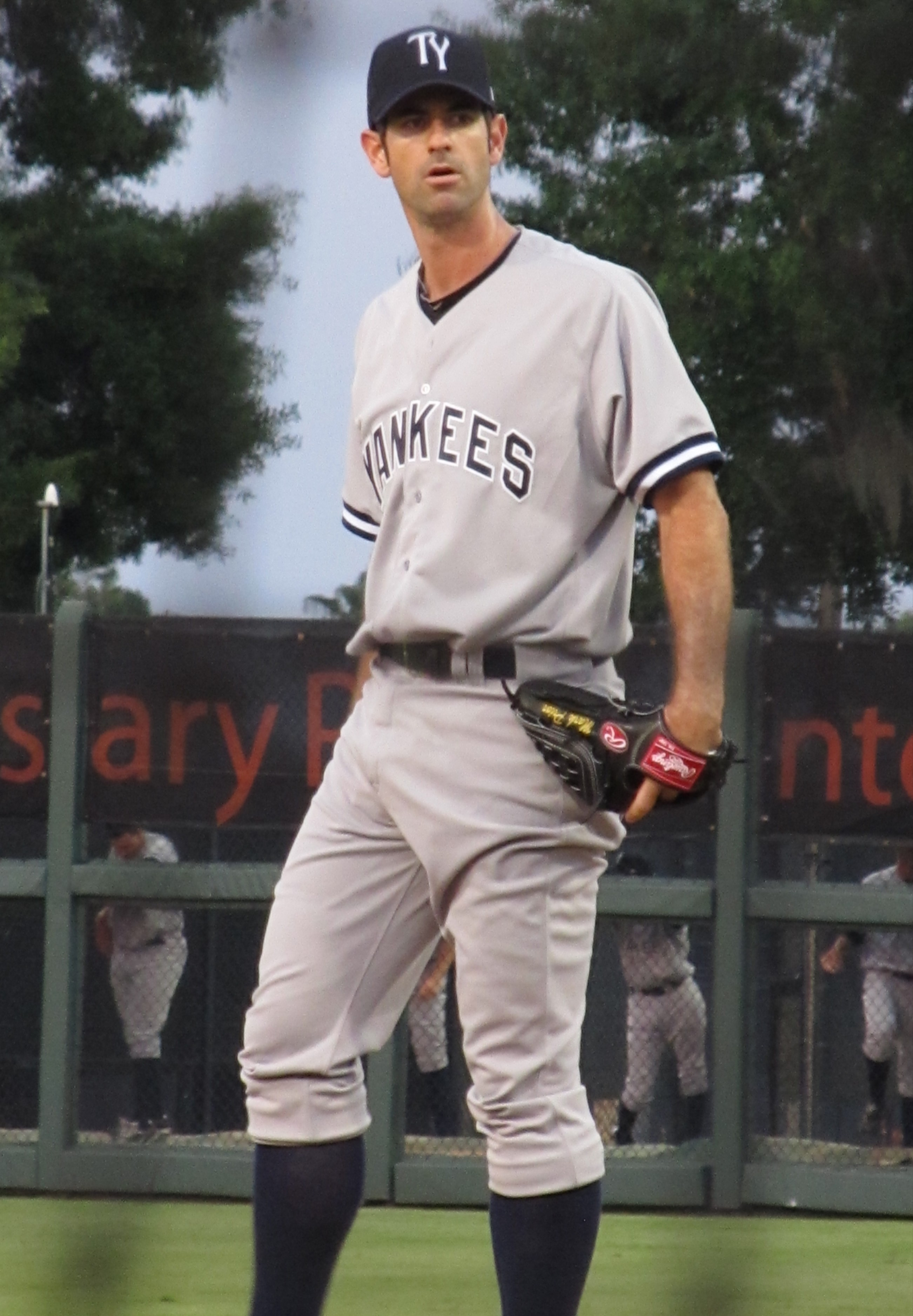
Mark Prior (1998) was one of three first-round draft picks who the Yankees did not sign.

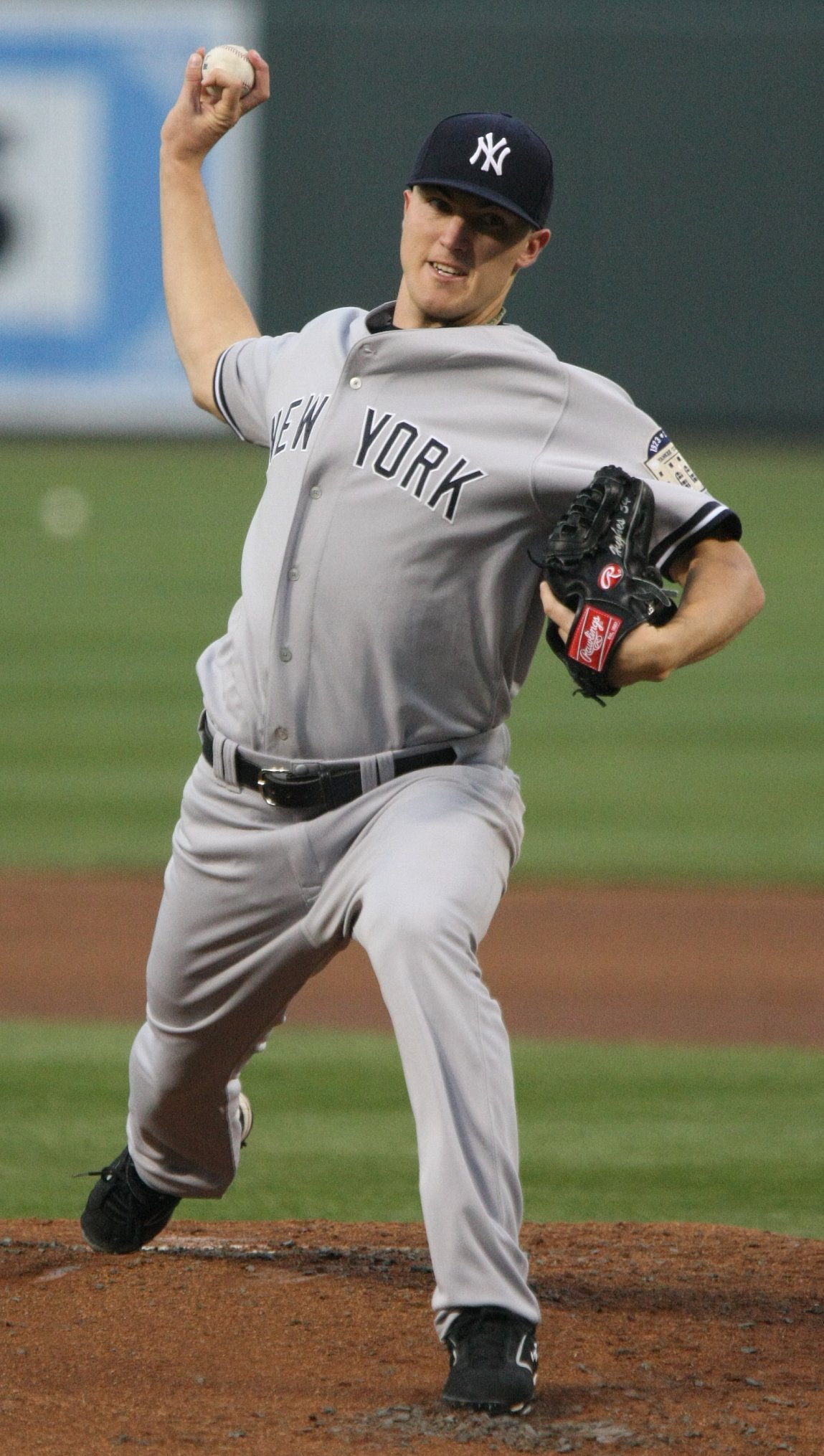
Phil Hughes (2004) was the Yankees' compensatory selection for losing Andy Pettitte to the Houston Astros.

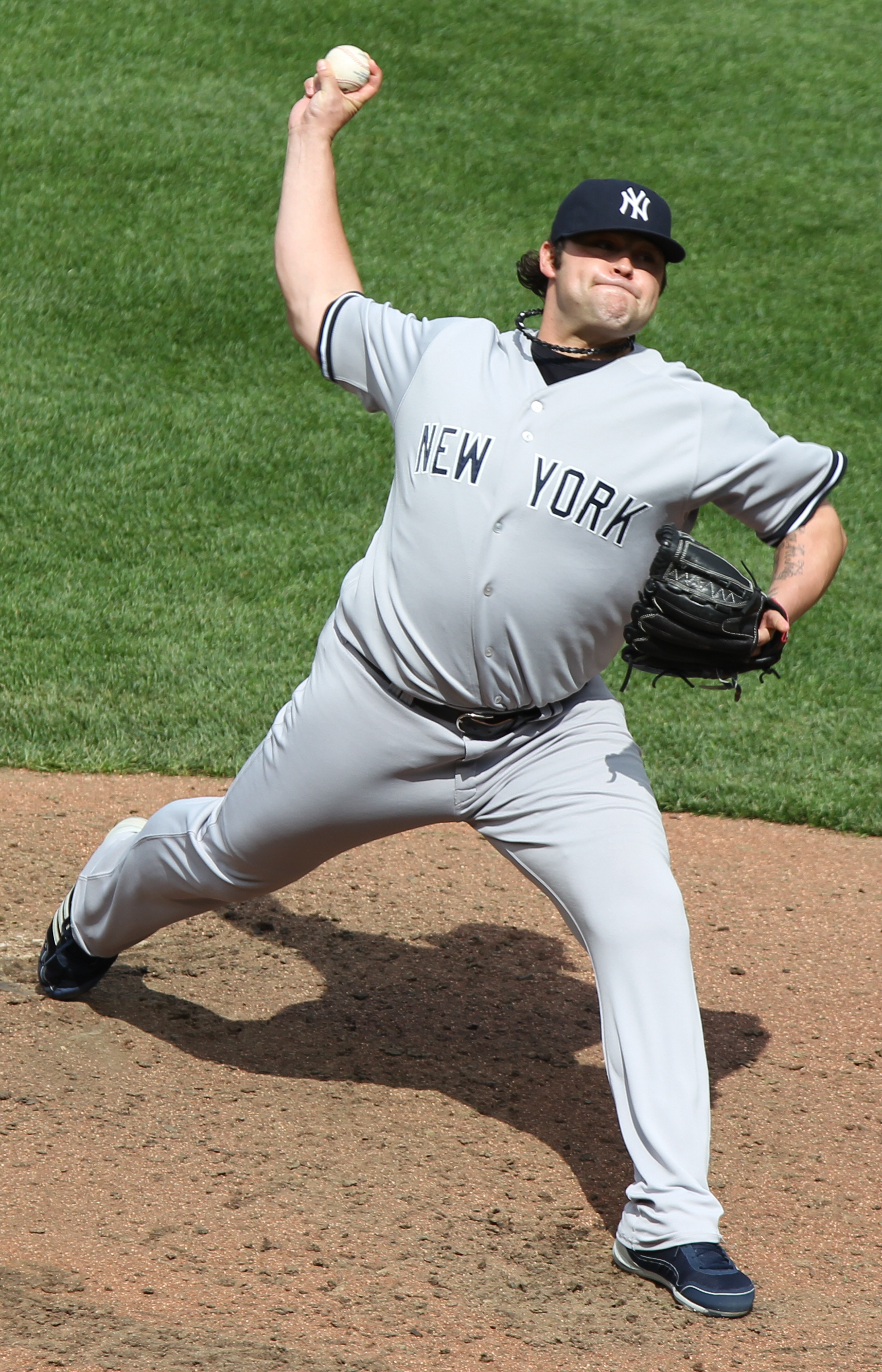
Joba Chamberlain (2006) was one of five consecutive pitchers the Yankees drafted in the first round.

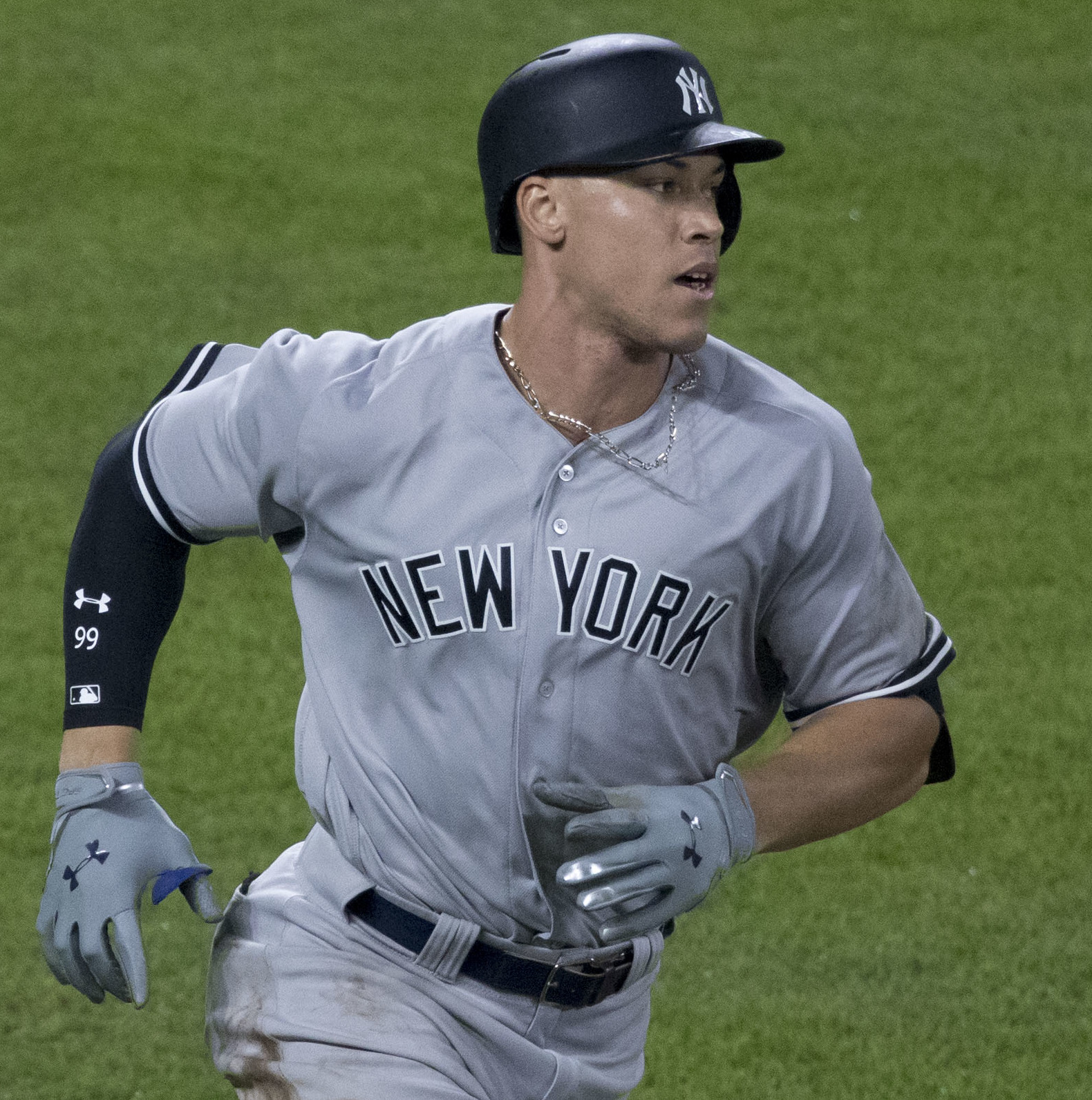
Aaron Judge (2013) was the second of the team's three first-round picks in 2013.

Year	Name	Position	School (Location)	Pick	Ref
1965	Bill Burbach	Right-handed pitcher	Wahlert High School (Dickeyville, Wisconsin)	19	
1966	Jim Lyttle	Outfielder	Florida State University (Tallahassee, Florida)	10	
1967	Ron Blomberg	First baseman	Druid Hills High School (Decatur, Georgia)	1	
1968	Thurman Munson	Catcher	Kent State University (Kent, Ohio)	4	
1969	Charlie Spikes	Third baseman	Central Memorial High School (Bogalusa, Louisiana)	11	
1970	Dave Cheadle	Left-handed pitcher	Asheville High School (Asheville, North Carolina)	12	
1971	Terry Whitfield	Outfielder	Palo Verde High School (Blythe, California)	19	
1972	Scott McGregor	Left-handed pitcher	El Segundo High School (El Segundo, California)	14	
1973	Doug Heinhold	Right-handed pitcher	Stroman High School (Victoria, Texas)	13	
1974	Dennis Sherrill	Shortstop	South Miami High School (Miami, Florida)	12	
1975	Jim McDonald	First baseman	Verbum Dei High School (Compton, California)	19	
1976	Pat Tabler	Outfielder	McNicholas High School (Cincinnati, Ohio)	16	
1977	Steve Taylor	Right-handed pitcher	University of Delaware (Newark, Delaware)	23	
1978	Rex Hudler	Shortstop	Bullard High School (Fresno, California)	18^{§}^{[a]}	
1978	Matt Winters	Outfielder	Williamsville High School (Williamsville, New York)	24^{§}^{[b]}	
1978	Brian Ryder	Right-handed pitcher	Shrewsbury High School (Shrewsbury, Massachusetts)	26	
1979	no first-round pick^{[c]}				
1980	no first-round pick^{[d]}				
1981	no first-round pick^{[e]}				
1982	no first-round pick^{[f]}				
1983	no first-round pick^{[g]}				
1984	Jeff Pries	Right-handed pitcher	University of California, Los Angeles (Los Angeles, California)	22	
1985	Anthony Balabon	Right-handed pitcher	Conestoga High School (Berwyn, Pennsylvania)	28^{§}^{[h]}	
1986	no first-round pick^{[i]}				
1987	no first-round pick^{[j]}				
1988	no first-round pick^{[k]}				
1989	no first-round pick^{[l]}				
1990	Carl Everett	Outfielder	Hillsborough High School (Tampa, Florida)	10	
1991	Brien Taylor	Left-handed pitcher	East Carteret High School (Beaufort, North Carolina)	1	
1992	Derek Jeter^{†}	Shortstop	Kalamazoo Central High School (Kalamazoo, Michigan)	6	
1993	Matt Drews	Right-handed pitcher	Sarasota High School (Sarasota, Florida)	13	
1994	Brian Buchanan	First baseman	University of Virginia (Charlottesville, Virginia)	24	
1995	Shea Morenz	Outfielder	The University of Texas at Austin (Austin, Texas)	27	
1996	Eric Milton	Left-handed pitcher	University of Maryland, College Park (College Park, Maryland)	20^{§}^{[m]}	
1997	Tyrell Godwin*	Outfielder	East Bladen High School (Elizabethtown, North Carolina)	24^{§}^{[n]}	
1997	Ryan Bradley	Right-handed pitcher	Arizona State University (Tempe, Arizona)	40^{§}^{[o]}	
1998	Andy Brown	Outfielder	Richmond High School (Richmond, Indiana)	24	
1998	Mark Prior*	Right-handed pitcher	University High School (San Diego, California)	43^{§}^{[p]}	
1999	David Walling	Right-handed pitcher	University of Arkansas (Fayetteville, Arkansas)	27	
2000	David Parrish	Catcher	University of Michigan (Ann Arbor, Michigan)	28	
2001	John-Ford Griffin	Outfielder	Florida State University (Tallahassee, Florida)	23^{§}^{[q]}	
2001	Bronson Sardinha	Shortstop	Kamehameha High School (Honolulu, Hawaii)	34^{§}^{[r]}	
2001	Jon Skaggs	Right-handed pitcher	Rice University (Houston, Texas)	42^{§}^{[s]}	
2002	no first-round pick^{[t]}				
2003	Eric Duncan	Third baseman	Seton Hall Preparatory School (West Orange, New Jersey)	27	
2004	Phil Hughes	Right-handed pitcher	Foothill High School (Santa Ana, California)	23^{§}^{[u]}	
2004	Jonathan Poterson	Catcher	Chandler High School (Chandler, Arizona)	37^{§}^{[v]}	
2004	Jeffrey Marquez	Right-handed pitcher	Sacramento City College (Sacramento, California)	41^{§}^{[w]}	
2005	Carl Henry	Shortstop	Putnam City High School (Oklahoma City, Oklahoma)	17	
2006	Ian Kennedy	Right-handed pitcher	University of Southern California (Los Angeles, California)	21^{§}^{[x]}	
2006	Joba Chamberlain	Right-handed pitcher	University of Nebraska–Lincoln (Lincoln, Nebraska)	41^{§}^{[y]}	
2007	Andrew Brackman	Right-handed pitcher	North Carolina State University (Raleigh, North Carolina)	30	
2008	Gerrit Cole*	Right-handed pitcher	Orange Lutheran High School (Orange, California)	28	
2008	Jeremy Bleich	Left-handed pitcher	Stanford University (Stanford, California)	44^{§}^{[z]}	
2009	Slade Heathcott	Outfielder	Texas High School (Texarkana, Texas)	29^{§}^{[aa]}	
2010	Cito Culver	Shortstop	West Irondequoit High School (Irondequoit, New York)	32	
2011	Dante Bichette, Jr.	Third Baseman	Orangewood Christian High School (Maitland, Florida)	51^{§}^{[ab]}	
2012	Ty Hensley	Right-handed pitcher	Santa Fe High School (Edmond, Oklahoma)	30	
2013	Eric Jagielo	Third Baseman	University of Notre Dame (South Bend, Indiana)	26	
2013	Aaron Judge	Outfielder	California State University, Fresno (Fresno, California)	32^{§}	
2013	Ian Clarkin	Left-handed pitcher	James Madison High School (San Diego, California)	33^{§}	
2014	no first-round pick				
2015	James Kaprielian	Right-handed pitcher	University of California, Los Angeles (Los Angeles, California)	16	
2015	Kyle Holder	Shortstop	University of San Diego (San Diego, California)	30^{§}	
2016	Blake Rutherford	Outfielder	Chaminade College Prep (West Hills, California)	18	
2017	Clarke Schmidt	Right-handed pitcher	University of South Carolina (Columbia, SC)	16	
2018	Anthony Seigler	Catcher	Cartersville High School (Cartersville, GA)	23	
2019	Anthony Volpe	Shortstop	Delbarton School (Morristown, NJ)	30	
2019	T. J. Sikkema	Left-handed pitcher	University of Missouri (Columbia, MO)	38^{§}	
2020	Austin Wells	Catcher	University of Arizona (Tucson, AZ)	28	
2021	Trey Sweeney	Shortstop	Eastern Illinois University (Charleston, IL)	20	
2022	Spencer Jones	Outfielder	Vanderbilt University (Nashville, TN)	25	
2023	George Lombard Jr.	shortstop	Gulliver Preparatory School (Pinecrest, Florida)	26	
2024	Ben Hess	Right-Handed Pitcher	University of Alabama (Tuscaloosa, AL)	26	
2025	Dax Kilby	Shortstop	Newnan High School (Newnan, GA)	39^{§}	
2026	Hunter Dietz	Pitcher	Arkansas (Fayetteville, AR)	35^{§}	

== Footnotes ==
- ^{V} Through the 2012 draft, free agents were evaluated by the Elias Sports Bureau and rated "Type A", "Type B", or not compensation-eligible. If a team offered arbitration to a player but that player refused and subsequently signed with another team, the original team was able to receive additional draft picks. If a "Type A" free agent left in this way, his previous team received a supplemental pick and a compensatory pick from the team with which he signed. If a "Type B" free agent left in this way, his previous team received only a supplemental pick. Since the 2013 draft, free agents are no longer classified by type; instead, compensatory picks are only awarded if the team offered its free agent a contract worth at least the average of the 125 current richest MLB contracts. However, if the free agent's last team acquired the player in a trade during the last year of his contract, it is ineligible to receive compensatory picks for that player.
- ^{a} The Yankees gained a compensatory first round pick in the 1978 draft from the Chicago White Sox for the loss of free agent Ron Blomberg.
- ^{b} The Yankees gained a compensatory first round pick in the 1978 draft from the Boston Red Sox for the loss of free agent Mike Torrez.
- ^{c} The Yankees lost their first round pick in the 1979 draft to the Los Angeles Dodgers as compensation for signing free agent Tommy John.
- ^{d} The Yankees lost their first round pick in the 1980 draft to the Montreal Expos as compensation for signing free agent Rudy May.
- ^{e} The Yankees lost their first round pick in the 1981 draft to the San Diego Padres as compensation for signing free agent Dave Winfield.
- ^{f} The Yankees lost their first round pick in the 1982 draft to the Cincinnati Reds as compensation for signing free agent Dave Collins.
- ^{g} The Yankees lost their first round pick in the 1983 draft to the Chicago White Sox as compensation for signing free agent Steve Kemp.
- ^{h} The Yankees gained a compensatory first round pick in the 1985 draft for losing Tim Belcher in the 1984 compensation draft. The Yankees lost their first round pick to the San Diego Padres as compensation for signing free agent Ed Whitson.
- ^{i} The Yankees lost their first round pick in the 1986 draft to the California Angels as compensation for signing free agent Al Holland.
- ^{j} The Yankees lost their first round pick in the 1987 draft to the Texas Rangers as compensation for signing free agent Gary Ward.
- ^{k} The Yankees lost their first round pick in the 1988 draft to the St. Louis Cardinals as compensation for signing free agent Jack Clark.
- ^{l} The Yankees lost their first round pick in the 1989 draft to the Los Angeles Dodgers as compensation for signing free agent Steve Sax.
- ^{m} The Yankees gained a compensatory first round pick in the 1996 draft from the Anaheim Angels for the loss of free agent Randy Velarde. The Yankees lost their first round pick to the Texas Rangers as compensation for signing free agent Kenny Rogers.
- ^{n} The Yankees gained a compensatory first round pick in the 1997 draft from the Texas Rangers for the loss of free agent John Wetteland. The Yankees lost their first round pick to the Baltimore Orioles as compensation for signing free agent David Wells.
- ^{o} The Yankees gained a supplemental first round pick in the 1997 draft for the loss of free agent John Wetteland.
- ^{p} The Yankees gained a compensatory first round pick in the 1998 draft for failing to sign 1997 first round pick Tyrell Godwin.
- ^{q} The Yankees gained a compensatory first round pick in the 1998 draft from the Seattle Mariners for losing free agent Jeff Nelson.
- ^{r} The Yankees gained a supplemental first round pick in the 1998 draft for losing free agent Denny Neagle.
- ^{s} The Yankees gained a supplemental first round pick in the 1998 draft for losing free agent Jeff Nelson. The Yankees lost their first round pick to the Baltimore Orioles as compensation for signing free agent Mike Mussina.
- ^{t} The Yankees lost their first round pick in the 2002 draft to the Oakland Athletics as compensation for signing free agent Jason Giambi.
- ^{u} The Yankees gained a compensatory first round pick in the 2004 draft from the Houston Astros for losing free agent Andy Pettitte.
- ^{v} The Yankees gained a supplemental first round pick in the 2004 draft as compensation for losing free agent Andy Pettitte. The Yankees lost their first round pick to the Los Angeles Dodgers as compensation for signing free agent Paul Quantrill.
- ^{w} The Yankees gained a supplemental first round pick in the 2004 draft for losing free agent David Wells.
- ^{x} The Yankees gained a compensatory first round pick in the 2006 draft from the Philadelphia Phillies for losing free agent Tom Gordon. The Yankees lost their first round pick to the Boston Red Sox as compensation for signing free agent Johnny Damon.
- ^{y} The Yankees gained a supplemental first round pick in the 2006 draft as compensation for losing free agent Tom Gordon.
- ^{z} The Yankees gained a supplemental first round pick in the 2008 draft as compensation for losing free agent Luis Vizcaíno.
- ^{aa} The Yankees gained a compensatory first round pick in the 2009 draft for failing to sign 2008 first round pick Gerrit Cole. The Yankees lost their first round pick to the Los Angeles Angels of Anaheim as compensation for signing free agent Mark Teixeira.
- ^{ab} The Yankees gained a compensatory first round pick in the 2011 draft as compensation for losing free agent Javier Vázquez. The Yankees lost their first round pick to the Tampa Bay Rays as compensation for signing free agent Rafael Soriano.

== See also ==
- New York Yankees minor league players
