= New York's 136th State Assembly district =

American legislative district

Assemblymember
Sarah Clark; D–Rochester

New York's 136th State Assembly district is one of the 150 districts in the New York State Assembly. It has been represented by Sarah Clark since 2021, succeeding Jamie Romeo.

== Geography ==
District 136 is located entirely within Monroe County. It contains outer Rochester and the nearby suburbs of Irondequoit and Brighton.

== Recent election results ==
=== 2026 ===
2026 New York State Assembly election, District 136
Party	Candidate	Votes	%
Democratic	Sarah Clark		
Working Families	Sarah Clark		
Total	Sarah Clark (incumbent)		
Republican	Clianda Florence		
Conservative	Clianda Florence		
Total	Clianda Florence		
Write-in			
Total votes			

=== 2024 ===
2024 New York State Assembly election, District 136
Party	Candidate	Votes	%
Democratic	Sarah Clark	37,039	
Working Families	Sarah Clark	3,880	
Total	Sarah Clark (incumbent)	40,919	67.4
Republican	Orlando Rivera	16,811	
Conservative	Orlando Rivera	2,958	
Total	Orlando Rivera	19,769	32.6
Write-in		32	0.0
Total votes		60,720	100.0
Democratic hold			

=== 2022 ===
2022 New York State Assembly election, District 136
Party	Candidate	Votes	%
Democratic	Sarah Clark	28,882	
Working Families	Sarah Clark	3,081	
Total	Sarah Clark (incumbent)	31,963	66.4
Republican	Orlando Rivera	13,440	
Conservative	Orlando Rivera	2,745	
Total	Orlando Rivera	16,185	33.6
Write-in		16	0.0
Total votes		48,164	100.0
Democratic hold			

=== 2020 ===
2020 New York State Assembly election, District 136
Primary election
Party	Candidate	Votes	%
Democratic	Sarah Clark	9,206	63.4
Democratic	Justin Wilcox	4,025	27.8
Democratic	Nelson Lopatin	1,275	8.8
Write-in		10	0.0
Total votes		14,516	100
General election
Democratic	Sarah Clark	40,366	
Working Families	Sarah Clark	4,669	
Total	Sarah Clark	45,035	86.7
Independence	Justin Wilcox	3,955	7.6
Libertarian	Steven Becker	2,925	5.6
Write-in		58	0.1
Total votes		51,973	100.0
Democratic hold			

=== 2018 ===
2018 New York State Assembly election, District 136
Primary election
Party	Candidate	Votes	%
Democratic	Jamie Romeo	6,621	62.3
Democratic	Jaclyn Richard	2,695	25.4
Democratic	Todd Grady	1,305	12.3
Write-in		0	0.0
Total votes		10,621	100
General election
Democratic	Jamie Romeo	34,276	
Independence	Jamie Romeo	2,022	
Working Families	Jamie Romeo	1,673	
Women's Equality	Jamie Romeo	766	
Total	Jamie Romeo	38,737	99.3
Write-in		258	0.7
Total votes		38,995	100.0
Democratic hold			

=== 2016 ===
2016 New York State Assembly election, District 136
Party	Candidate	Votes	%
Democratic	Joseph Morelle	40,441	
Independence	Joseph Morelle	5,656	
Total	Joseph Morelle (incumbent)	46,097	99.5
Write-in		248	0.5
Total votes		46,345	100.0
Democratic hold			

=== 2014 ===
2014 New York State Assembly election, District 136
Party	Candidate	Votes	%
Democratic	Joseph Morelle	22,662	
Independence	Joseph Morelle	4,499	
Total	Joseph Morelle (incumbent)	27,161	99.0
Write-in		263	1.0
Total votes		27,424	100.0
Democratic hold			

=== 2012 ===
2012 New York State Assembly election, District 136
Party	Candidate	Votes	%
Democratic	Joseph Morelle	39,488	
Independence	Joseph Morelle	4,915	
Total	Joseph Morelle (incumbent)	44,403	99.9
Write-in		66	0.1
Total votes		44,469	100.0
Democratic hold			
