= WIRQ =

- Rochester, New York; United States
- Frequency: 90.9 MHz

Programming
- Format: Alternative

Ownership
- Owner: West Irondequoit Central School District

History
- First air date: December 19, 1959
- Former frequencies: 90.9 MHz (1959–1981); 93.3 MHz (1981–1990s); 104.7 MHz (1990s–2011)
- Call sign meaning: "West Irondequoit Radio Quality"

Technical information
- Licensing authority: FCC
- Facility ID: 71611
- Class: D
- ERP: 19 watts
- HAAT: 35.0 meters (114.8 ft)
- Transmitter coordinates: 43°12′59″N 77°35′51″W

Links
- Public license information: Public file; LMS
- Website: About WIRQ

WIRQ (90.9 FM) is a non-profit radio station broadcasting an alternative format. The station is licensed to Rochester, New York, United States, and is owned by the West Irondequoit Central School District.

WIRQ began broadcasting on December 19, 1959. Originally at 90.9 MHz, the station moved to 93.3 MHz in 1981, then in the early 1990s moved to 94.3 MHz for several years before moving again to 104.7 MHz. In mid-February 2011 the station moved frequency yet again, back to its original 90.9 MHz.

March 1983 marked the beginnings of the station's alternative format. Before then, the station had been mostly block-programmed.

== Broadcasting times ==
WIRQ broadcasts their alternative format during school hours following the Irondequoit High School Morning Show (8:15 am to 3:00 pm, Monday to Friday). After 3:00 pm, the station plays music on an automated program which also runs on the weekends and during school breaks, giving WIRQ listeners 365 days of broadcast coverage.

== Station leadership ==
WIRQ is overseen by the student executive board under the guidance of faculty advisor, Mr. Richard Jones. The 2019–2020 executive board members are:

- Station manager: Lily LiPera
- Co-station manager: Rory Vancheri
- Music director: Sophia Larson
- Business director: Annabelle

== Specialty shows ==
Prior to December 2011, WIRQ DJs hosted specialty shows from 4:00 pm to 6:00 pm, but those have now been moved to the regular broadcasting hours between 8:00 am and 3:00 pm. These shows play music from a certain genre or time period, and each DJ has the opportunity to do one specialty show a week in addition to their regularly scheduled radio show.
