= Sarah Clark (politician) =

American politician

Member of the New York State Assembly from the 136th district
- Incumbent
- Assumed office November 12, 2020
- Preceded by: Jamie Romeo

Personal details
- Party: Democratic
- Education: Stony Brook University
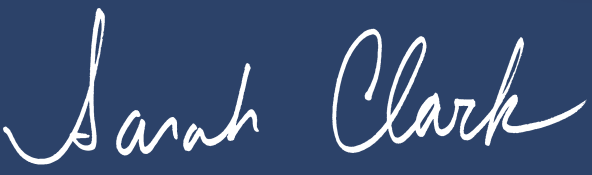
- Signature
- Website: Official website Campaign website

Sarah Clark is an American politician from the state of New York. A Democrat, Clark has represented the 136th district of the New York State Assembly, based in outer Rochester and the nearby suburbs of Irondequoit and Brighton, since November 2020.

== Early career ==
After graduating from East High School and graduating from Stony Brook University, Clark interned for then-Mayor of Rochester Bill Johnson. Clark went on to work for U.S. Senators Hillary Clinton and Kirsten Gillibrand, serving as Gillibrand's deputy state director from her appointment in 2009 onwards.

== Political career ==
In 2020, after incumbent Jamie Romeo was appointed as Monroe County Clerk, Clark announced she would run for the 136th district of the New York State Assembly. With the backing of Hillary Clinton, Kirsten Gillibrand, and the Working Families Party, Clark handily won the Democratic primary 63-28% over county legislator Justin Wilcox. Clark faced no major-party opposition in the general election, and was seated in the Assembly on November 12.

In 2022, Clark was re-elected to a second term after defeating Republican candidate, Orlando Rivera, with 64% of the vote.

== Personal life ==
Clark lives in the Maplewood neighborhood of Rochester with her husband, John, and their three children.

== Electoral history ==
=== 2020 ===
2020 New York State Assembly election, District 136
Primary election
Party	Candidate	Votes	%
Democratic	Sarah Clark	9,210	63.4
Democratic	Justin Wilcox	4,025	27.7
Democratic	Nelson Lopatin	1,277	8.8
Total votes		14,512	100.0
General election
Democratic	Sarah Clark	45,035	86.7
Independence	Justin Wilcox	3,955	7.6
Libertarian	Steven Becker	2,925	5.6
Total votes		51,915	100.0
Democratic hold			

=== 2022 ===
2022 New York State Assembly election, District 136
Party	Candidate	Votes	%
Democratic	Sarah Clark (incumbent)	31,963	66.4
Republican	Orlando Rivera	16,185	33.6
Total votes		48,184	100.0
Democratic hold			
