= People v. Gissendanner =

- Court: New York Court of Appeals
- Full case name: The People of the State of New York, Respondent, v. Vida Gissendanner, Appellant.
- Argued: November 13 1979
- Decided: December 17 1979
- Citation: 48 N.Y.2d 543

Holding
- Affirmed the judgment of conviction

People v. Gissendanner, 48 N.Y.2d 543 (1979), was an important decision by the Court of Appeals of New York that placed limits on the ability of a defendant to subpoena personnel records of police officers.

== Background ==
Undercover police officers in Irondequoit, New York, conducted a drug sting and arrested Vida Gissendanner. Gissendanner disputed the events described by officers and counsel attempted to subpoena their records for cross-examination, which the court refused to sign based on a lack of a "factual basis" since such records are considered confidential unless consent is given by the officer or a court order. A jury found Gissendanner guilty of selling cocaine and she received a one year to life sentence.

== Decision ==
The case established a burden of relevance for defendants wishing to access police records to confront witnesses and find exculpatory evidence. The court ruled that "there is no compulsion when requests to examine records are motivated by nothing more than impeachment of witnesses' general credibility".

A defense counsel request to access police records is now known as a Gissendanner motion.
