= David Walker (American football coach) =

American football coach (born 1969)

Personal information
- Born: December 4, 1969 (age 56)

Career information
- High school: Irondequoit (NY)
- College: Syracuse
- NFL draft: 1993: undrafted

Career history

Playing
- Miami Dolphins (1993)*
- * Offseason or practice squad member only

Coaching
- Miami (FL) Carol City Senior HS (1994) Assistant; Syracuse (1995–2003) Running backs coach; Pittsburgh (2004–2010) Running backs coach; Indianapolis Colts (2011–2014) Running backs coach; Carmel (IN) HS (2015) Offensive coordinator; Detroit Lions (2016–2018) Running backs coach; Chicago Bears (2022–2023) Running backs coach

Awards and highlights
- 2× First-team All-East (1990, 1991)

David Lee Walker (born December 4, 1969) is an NFL assistant coach who formerly served as the running backs coach of the Chicago Bears.

== Early life ==
Walker grew up in the Rochester, New York suburb of Irondequoit, where he was a four-time all-county football player. He was captain of an Irondequoit Indians team that won the Sectional championship in 1987, and was later selected as an inaugural member of the Section V Football Hall of Fame.

== Playing career ==
Recruited by dozens of major colleges, Walker chose to attend Syracuse University, where he became one of the most prolific running backs for a school renowned for great runners. He finished his college career with 2,643 rushing yards, which was the fourth best total in school history when he graduated. He was behind Joe Morris (4,299 yards), Larry Csonka (2,934), and Floyd Little (2,704) and ahead of Heisman Trophy winner Ernie Davis and Hall of Famer Jim Brown. Walker earned All-Big East honors twice. He captained the 1992 team, leading it to a number 6 national ranking, 10-2 overall record and 26-22 victory over Colorado in the Fiesta Bowl.

Walker was not selected in the 1993 NFL draft, but signed a free-agent contract with the Miami Dolphins. He was assigned to the team's practice squad, but was released without appearing in a regular season game.

== Coaching career ==
Walker spent the 1994 season as an assistant coach at Miami Carol City Senior High School. In 1995, he returned to his alma mater as the running backs coach for the Syracuse Orange, a position he held for ten seasons. During that time, he tutored six running backs who would go on to play in the NFL. He oversaw four consecutive 1,000-yard rushers from 2000–03, a Syracuse record. Overall, Walker coached three of the Orange's top seven all-time leading rushers.

Following the 2004 season, Walker left Syracuse to join Dave Wannstedt's staff at the University of Pittsburgh, where he remained through the 2010 season. Two of the running backs Walker coached at Pittsburgh went on to the NFL.

In January 2011, he was named running backs coach at the University of Maryland, but three weeks later he was hired to the same position by the NFL's Indianapolis Colts. Although head coach Jim Caldwell and most of his staff were fired following the 2011 season, the Colts announced that Walker would be retained. On January 26, 2015, Walker was fired by the Colts.

Walker was hired as the running backs coach of the Detroit Lions on January 23, 2016. After three seasons with the team, he announced that he was stepping away from coaching to pursue other opportunities on January 29, 2019. He returned to the NFL ranks with the Chicago Bears, named their running backs coach on February 9, 2022. On November 1, 2023, Walker was fired by the Bears over workplace behavior.
