= Jamie Romeo =

American politician (born 1984/85)

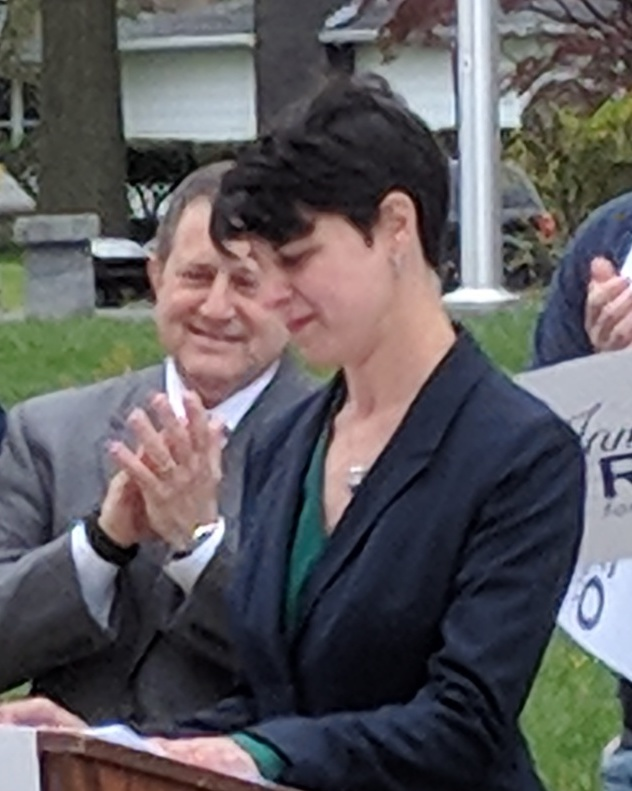
- Romeo announces her Assembly run in 2018

Monroe County Clerk
- Incumbent
- Assumed office February 6, 2020
- Preceded by: Adam Bello

Member of the New York State Assembly from the 136th district
- In office January 9, 2019 – February 6, 2020
- Preceded by: Joe Morelle
- Succeeded by: Sarah Clark

Personal details
- Born: 1984 or 1985 (age 40–41)
- Party: Democratic
- Education: St. John Fisher College (BA); SUNY Brockport (MPA)
- Website: Official website Campaign website

Jamie Romeo is an American politician from the state of New York. A Democrat, Romeo has served as Monroe County Clerk since 2020. She previously represented the 136th district in the New York State Assembly, covering parts of Rochester and its inner suburbs, from 2019 until 2020.

== Career ==
While still obtaining her MPA at SUNY Brockport, Romeo began her political career working for the Democratic legislative office in Monroe County. Afterwards, she held positions as chief of staff for State Senator Ted O'Brien and executive director of the Monroe County Democratic Committee.

== Electoral history ==
In 2018, after the death of U.S. Congresswoman Louise Slaughter, Assemblymen Joseph Morelle announced a run for her former congressional seat opening up the New York State Assembly seat in the 136th district that he occupied for the first time since 1990. Romeo ran for the seat, defeating two other candidates in the primary election and facing no opposition in the November general election. She took office on January 9, 2019.

After Monroe County Clerk Adam Bello was elected Monroe County Executive in 2019, Romeo announced her candidacy for his former office. On February 6, 2020, Governor Andrew Cuomo appointed her to the position in advance of the 2020 election.

== Personal life ==
Romeo was born and raised in Irondequoit, where she continues to live with her son, Dominic.

Political offices
Preceded by Joe Morelle	New York State Assembly, 136th District; January 1, 2019 – February 6, 2020	Succeeded by Sarah Clark
Preceded by Adam Bello	Monroe County, New York Clerk; February 6, 2020 – present	Succeeded by Incumbent
