= Slade Heathcott =

American baseball player

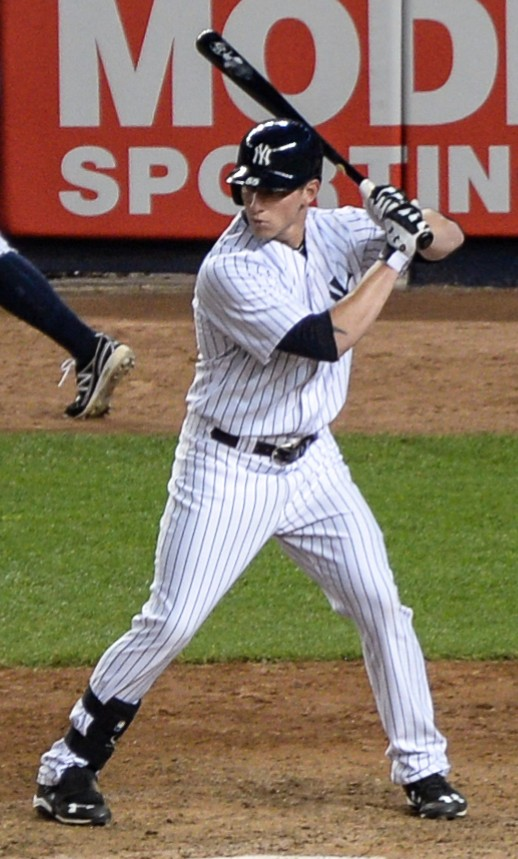
- Heathcott batting for the New York Yankees in 2015
- Outfielder
- Born: September 28, 1990 (age 35); Texarkana, Texas, U.S.
- Batted: Left Threw: Left

MLB debut
- May 20, 2015, for the New York Yankees

Last MLB appearance
- October 3, 2015, for the New York Yankees

MLB statistics
- Batting average: .400
- Home runs: 2
- Runs batted in: 8
- Stats at Baseball Reference

Teams
- New York Yankees (2015)

Zachary Slade Heathcott (born September 28, 1990) is an American former professional baseball outfielder. Heathcott was a first-round draft pick by the New York Yankees of Major League Baseball (MLB) out of Texas High School in the 2009 MLB draft. He played in 17 games for the Yankees during the 2015 season.

== Early life ==
Heathcott was born in Texarkana, Texas. His mother, Kimberly, became pregnant with him while a teenager. Her relationship with his biological father ended soon thereafter, and she married Jeff Heathcott, who adopted him. Jeff was arrested and convicted for forgery. The couple divorced while he was in high school. Kimberly relocated with Heathcott's younger brother, Zane, to Alexandria, Louisiana, while he remained in high school, attending Texas High School in Texarkana, Texas. Heathcott spent his senior year of high school living out of his truck.

At Texas High, Heathcott starred for the baseball and American football teams. An outfielder and pitcher for the baseball team, Heathcott led Texas High to the state's Class 4A baseball championship in his senior season. He appeared in the Aflac All-American Game and committed to attend Louisiana State University on a baseball scholarship. For the football team, Heathcott played linebacker.

== Professional career ==
=== New York Yankees ===
Heathcott was drafted by the New York Yankees in the first round, with the 29th overall selection, of the 2009 Major League Baseball draft. Louisiana State withdrew their scholarship to Heathcott and he signed with the Yankees, receiving a $2.2 million signing bonus. He reported to the Gulf Coast Yankees of the Rookie-level Gulf Coast League to make his professional debut. He played for the Charleston RiverDogs of the Class A South Atlantic League (SAL) during the 2010 season, where he had a modest .258 batting average and struck out 101 times. Heathcott required offseason shoulder surgery. Returning to Charleston in 2011, he improved his batting average to .297 in his first 47 games, and was named to the SAL all-star team. He was promoted to the Tampa Yankees of the Class A-Advanced Florida State League that June. He played in one game for Tampa before missing time with a shoulder injury. He had surgery, and missed the remainder of the season.

Recovering from his injury, Heathcott played for the Tampa during the 2012 season. After the 2012 season, he played in the Arizona Fall League for the Scottsdale Scorpions. He was named week four's player of the week. The Yankees invited Heathcott to spring training in 2013. Playing for the Trenton Thunder of the Class AA Eastern League in 2013, Heathcott compiled a .261 batting average, eight home runs, and 49 runs batted in (RBIs) in 103 games played.

Heathcott was added to the Yankees' 40-man roster after the 2013 season to protect him from being selected in the Rule 5 draft. He underwent knee surgery during the offseason. In 2014, Heathcott played in nine games for the Thunder before his knee injury returned, which required surgery and ended his season. During the offseason, the Yankees opted not to tender Heathcott a contract. Within two days of his non-tender, 15 teams reached out to Heathcott's agent.

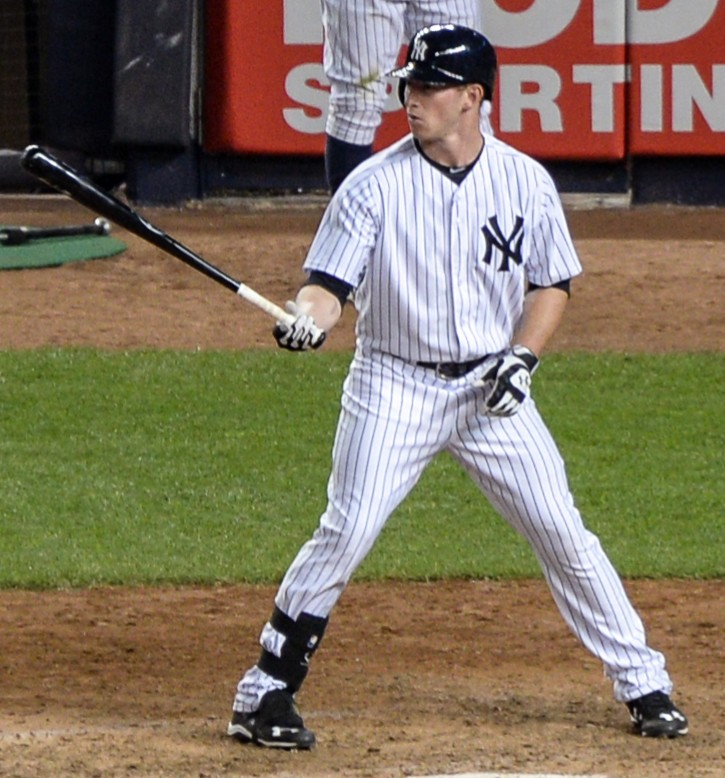
Heathcott batting for the New York Yankees in 2015

Heathcott and the Yankees agreed on a minor league contract where he would be paid $110,000 instead of the expected $72,500 salary and an opt-out set for July 1 in case the Yankees had not readded Heathcott to the 40-man roster. On January 6, 2015, the Yankees re-signed Heathcott to a minor league deal with an invitation to spring training. He won the James P. Dawson Award, given each year to the best rookie in spring training. Healthy to start the season, Heathcott was assigned to the Scranton/Wilkes-Barre RailRiders of the Class AAA International League. He batted .285 with 17 RBIs in his first 37 games. Following an injury to Yankees' center fielder Jacoby Ellsbury, the Yankees promoted Heathcott to the majors on May 20, 2015. He made his MLB debut that day, and received his first start on May 22. He hit his first MLB home run on May 25 against the Kansas City Royals' closer Greg Holland. After batting .353 (6-for-17) with a home run and three RBIs in six games for the Yankees, Heathcott went on the disabled list when an MRI diagnosed him with a strained quadriceps femoris muscle. The Yankees activated him from the disabled list and optioned him to Scranton/Wilkes-Barre on July 31. The Yankees promoted Heathcott after the end of the RailRiders' season on September 12. In his first at-bat after the promotion, Heathcott hit a game-winning home run against the Tampa Bay Rays' closer Brad Boxberger.

Heathcott began the 2016 season with Scranton/Wilkes-Barre. He batted .230 before suffering a knee injury, and went on the disabled list. As the Yankees also had left-handed outfielders Ben Gamel, Mason Williams, Jake Cave, and Dustin Fowler in their farm system, the team released Heathcott on May 26, 2016.

=== Chicago White Sox ===
On June 14, 2016, Heathcott signed a minor league contract with the Chicago White Sox. He spent the remainder of the season with the Triple–A Charlotte Knights, also playing in seven games for the rookie–level Arizona League White Sox. In 34 games for Charlotte, Heathcott batted .258/.407/.366 with two home runs and seven RBI. He elected free agency following the season on November 7.

=== San Francisco Giants ===
On March 18, 2017, Heathcott signed a minor league contract with the San Francisco Giants organization. He began the 2017 season with the Double–A Richmond Flying Squirrels of the Eastern League. and also played for the Sacramento River Cats of the Triple–A Pacific Coast League (PCL). In 119 games split between Richmond and Sacramento, he hit .267/.350/.435 with 14 home runs, 41 RBI, and 11 stolen bases. Heathcott elected free agency following the season on November 6.

=== Oakland Athletics ===
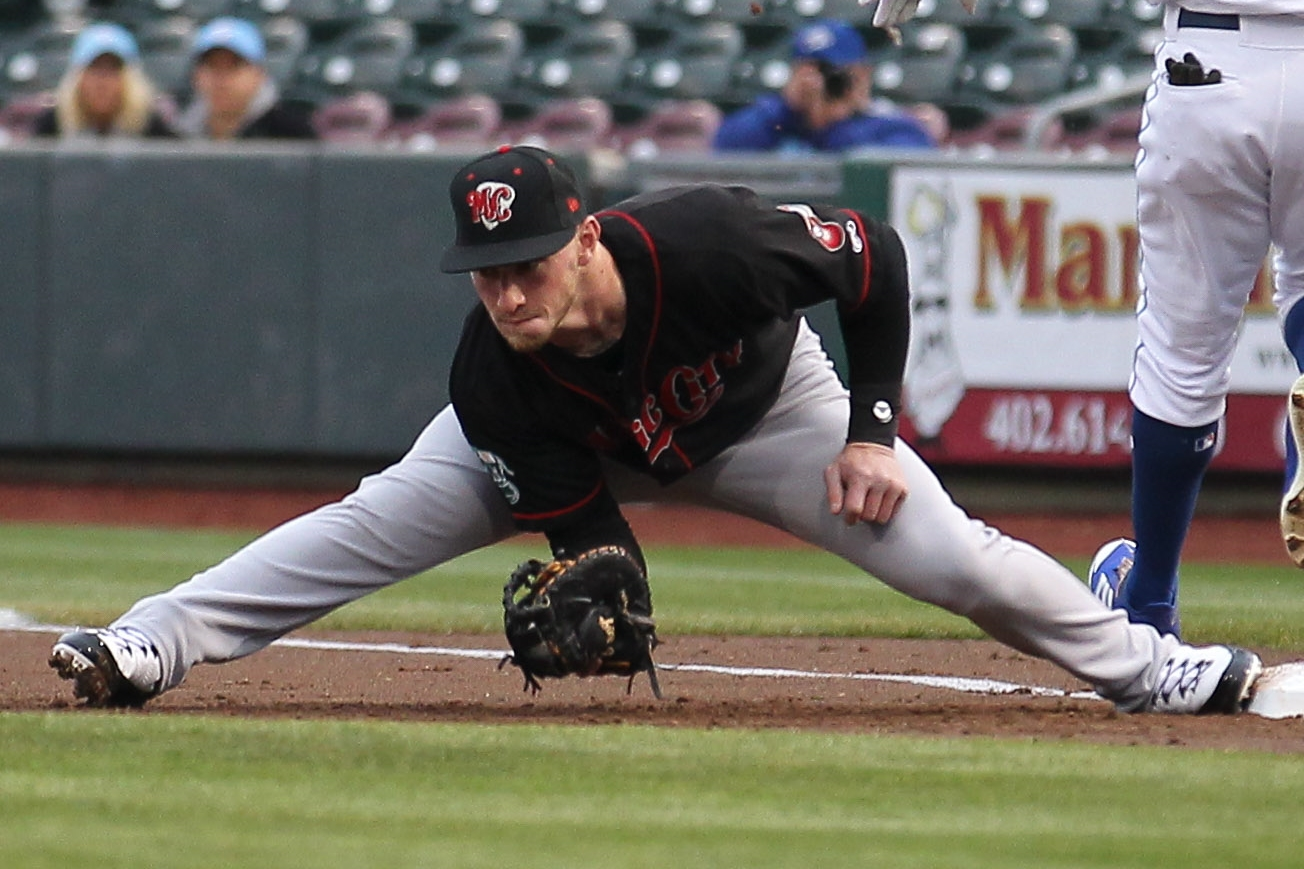
Heathcott with the Nashville Sounds in 2018

On January 8, 2018, Heathcott signed a minor league contract with the Oakland Athletics and was assigned to the Triple–A Nashville Sounds of the PCL. In 31 games for Nashville, he slashed .266/.333/.376 with one home run, nine RBI, and four stolen bases. Heathcott was released by the Athletics organization on May 15.

=== Sugar Land Skeeters ===
On July 13, 2018, Heathcott signed with the Sugar Land Skeeters of the Atlantic League of Professional Baseball. In 10 games for Sugar Land, he went 6–for–31 (.194) with three RBI and five walks. Heathcott became a free agent following the 2018 season. Heathcott announced his retirement from baseball on January 15, 2019, in order to become a commercial pilot.

== Personal life ==
During his junior year of high school, Heathcott was arrested for driving under the influence of alcohol and got kicked off the baseball team for poor academic performance. He also admitted to pointing a 12 gauge shotgun at his father during an argument.

The Yankees found out about Heathcott's alcohol problem when he blacked out and lost his passport the night before he was to fly to the Dominican Republic. They introduced him to Sam Marsonek, who took Heathcott to Alcoholics Anonymous meetings. Heathcott credits finding religion with helping him to turn around his personal life.

While at a restaurant in Tampa, Florida, Heathcott met Jessica Baumann. The two began dating, and were married in 2014. They have a son named Kysen.

== See also ==
- List of New York Yankees first-round draft picks
