= Joseph Morelle =

American politician (born 1957)

Joe Morelle
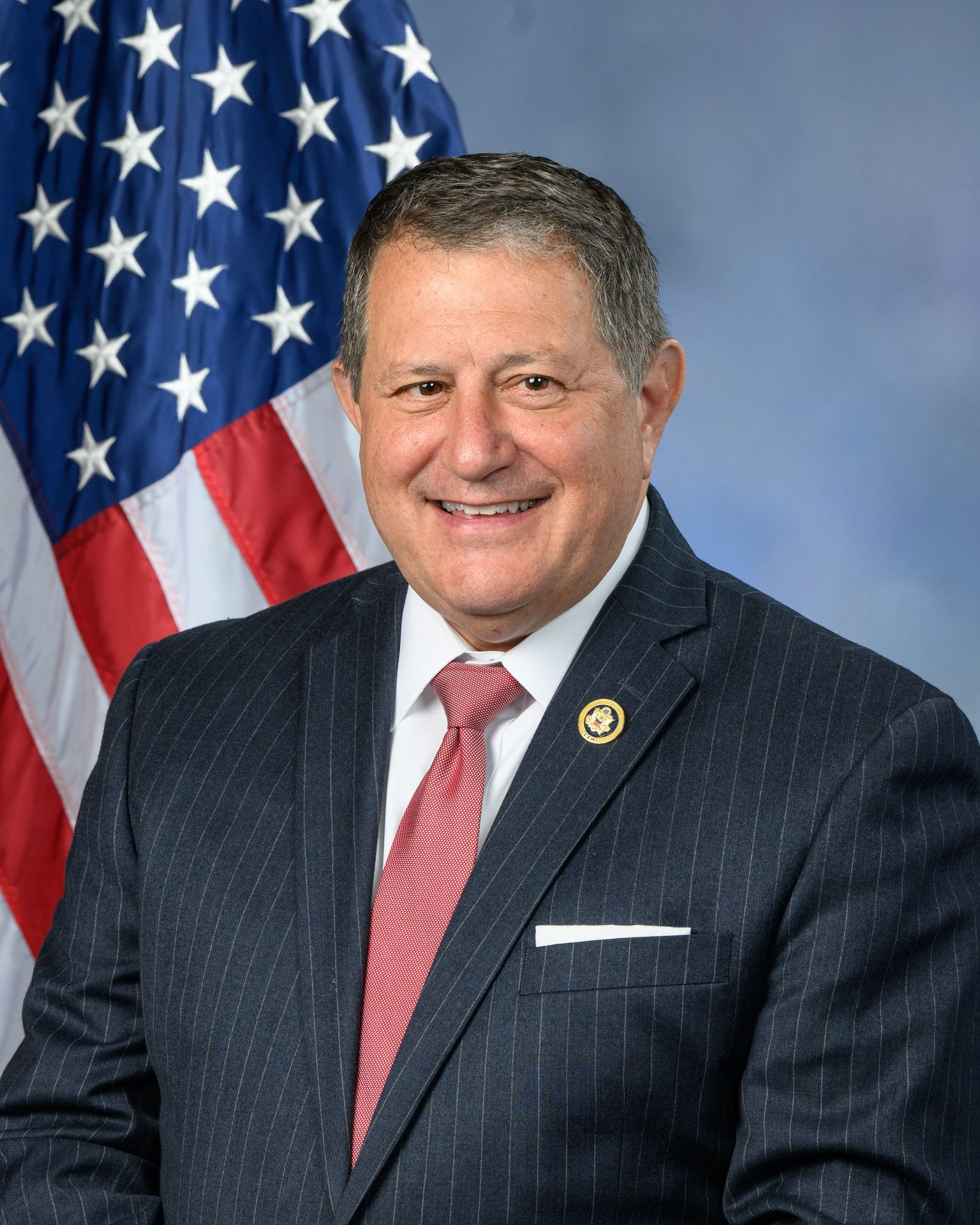
- Official portrait, 2024

Ranking Member of the House Administration Committee
- Incumbent
- Assumed office January 3, 2023
- Preceded by: Rodney Davis

Member of the U.S. House of Representatives from New York's 25th district
- Incumbent
- Assumed office November 13, 2018
- Preceded by: Louise Slaughter

Majority Leader of the New York State Assembly
- In office January 1, 2013 – November 13, 2018
- Preceded by: Ronald Canestrari
- Succeeded by: Crystal Peoples-Stokes

Speaker of the New York State Assembly Acting
- In office February 2, 2015 – February 3, 2015
- Preceded by: Sheldon Silver
- Succeeded by: Carl Heastie

Member of the New York State Assembly from the 136th district
- In office January 1, 1991 – November 13, 2018
- Preceded by: Pinny Cooke
- Succeeded by: Jamie Romeo

Personal details
- Born: April 29, 1957 (age 69) Utica, New York, U.S.
- Party: Democratic
- Spouse: Mary Bauer (m. 1984)
- Children: 3
- Education: State University of New York, Geneseo (BA)
- Website: House website Campaign website
- Morelle's voice Morelle supporting legislation to expedite the SIV program for Afghan refugees. Recorded July 20, 2021

Joseph D. Morelle (/məˈrɛli/ mə-RELL-ee; born April 29, 1957) is an American politician serving as the U.S. representative for New York's 25th congressional district since 2018. A Democrat, he was formerly a member of the New York State Assembly representing the 136th Assembly district, which includes eastern portions of the City of Rochester and the Monroe County suburbs of Irondequoit and Brighton. Speaker Sheldon Silver appointed him as majority leader of the New York State Assembly in January 2013 and Morelle served as acting speaker in the Speaker's absence. He was elected to the United States House of Representatives for New York's 25th congressional district in November 2018 following the death of longtime Representative Louise Slaughter.

== Early life and education ==
Morelle, who is of Italian American heritage, was born in Utica, New York, to Gilbert and Juliette Morelle. Gil was a Korean War veteran, a heating and cooling technician and a lifelong Plumbers and Pipefitters Union member. Joe and his three siblings grew up Catholic, on Vayo Street in Irondequoit, where he attended Eastridge High School. He received a Bachelor of Arts degree in political science from State University of New York at Geneseo in 1986.

In his early years, Morelle was a sales manager for a drycleaning and laundry business. He got his political start working for State Senator John D. Perry as a constituent services representative in Rochester and legislative aide in Albany.

== Political career ==
=== County legislature ===
Morelle, a Democrat, made his first foray into elective politics at age 24 when he ran for a seat in the Monroe County legislature. He failed to unseat the incumbent on the first try, but prevailed in the 1983 election. He was reelected once before running for the New York State legislature.

=== State legislature ===
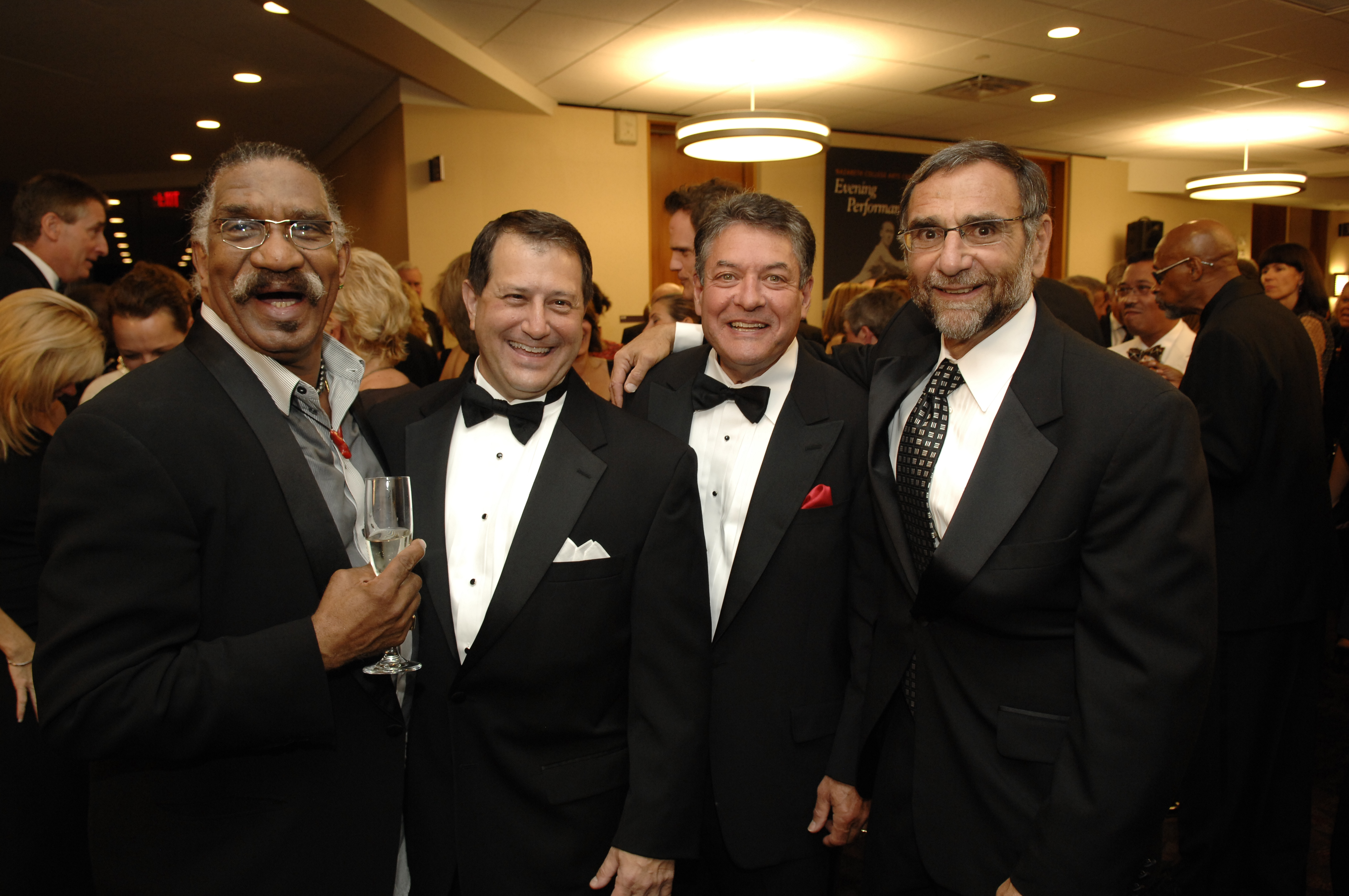
In 2009 with Garth Fagan, James Alesi, and Nazareth College president Daan Braveman

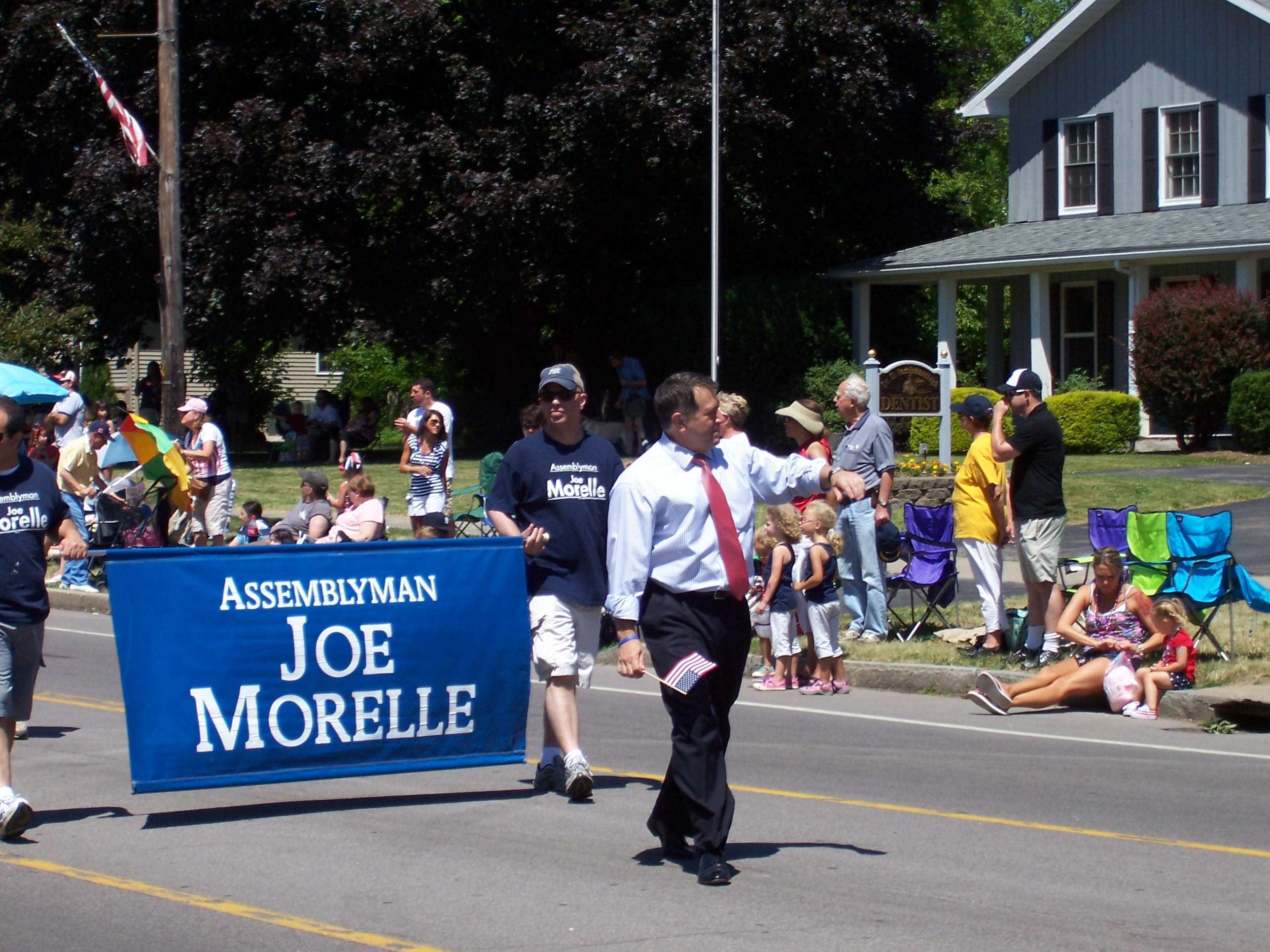
Marching on Independence Day in 2011

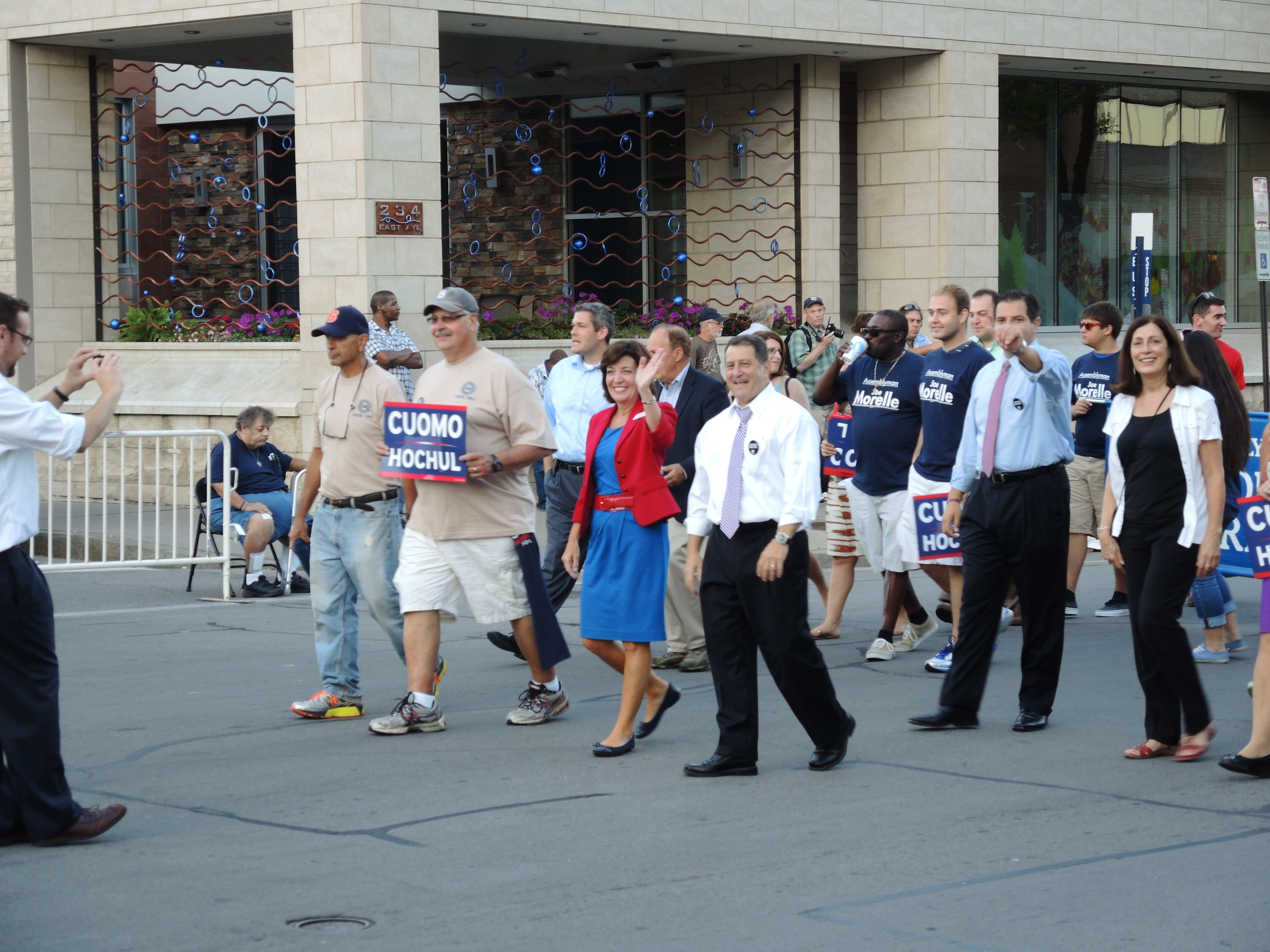
In 2014 with Kathy Hochul

Morelle was first elected to the State Assembly in 1990. He ran uncontested in the November 2008 general election and won the November 2010 general election with 61% of the vote.

While serving in the New York State Assembly, Morelle sponsored laws about public safety and how charitable organizations are regulated. A 2016 University of Rochester biography states that he wrote over 200 laws. In 2002, he introduced a law that required carbon monoxide detectors in some homes, which became Chapter 257 of the Laws of 2002. That same year, he helped pass a law to improve financial disclosure and oversight for charities, which became Chapter 43 of the Laws of 2002.

In January 2001, Morelle was appointed chair of the Assembly Standing Committee on Tourism, Arts, and Sports Development. As chair, he supported efforts to promote tourism in the Rochester region, including the development of a regional marketing campaign. He also encouraged local officials to consider converting Rochester's historic Auditorium Center into a performing arts center.

In addition to the Tourism Committee, he served on the standing committees on Economic Development, Job Creation, Commerce and Industry; Higher Education; Local Governments, and Libraries and Education Technology. He also chaired the Assembly Subcommittee on Manufacturing. In June 2005, the subcommittee participated in an Assembly roundtable examining how New York evaluated its public investments in research and development.

In 2005, Morelle was elected chair of the Monroe County Democratic Committee, and held this position until 2014.

==== Campaign violations ====
In 1990, an acting state Supreme Court justice ruled that Morelle fraudulently obtained several signatures on nominating petitions to qualify him for an independent line on the 1990 ballot (New York permits cross-filing in some circumstances) during his run for the State Assembly. Morelle remained on the ballot and won the election. He later admitted that he allowed family members to sign the petitions for the individuals whose names appeared on them and did not personally witness the signatures, both of which are illegal. In 1991 he was charged with seven misdemeanor counts of violating state election law. Morelle denied intentionally violating the law, but accepted a plea bargain in which he was found guilty of two counts of disorderly conduct. He was sentenced to 32 hours of community service and a $25 fine. Because disorderly conduct is a violation of the law, rather than a misdemeanor or felony, Morelle's plea enabled him to avoid having a permanent criminal record as a result of the incident.

== U.S. House of Representatives ==
=== Elections ===
==== 2018 ====
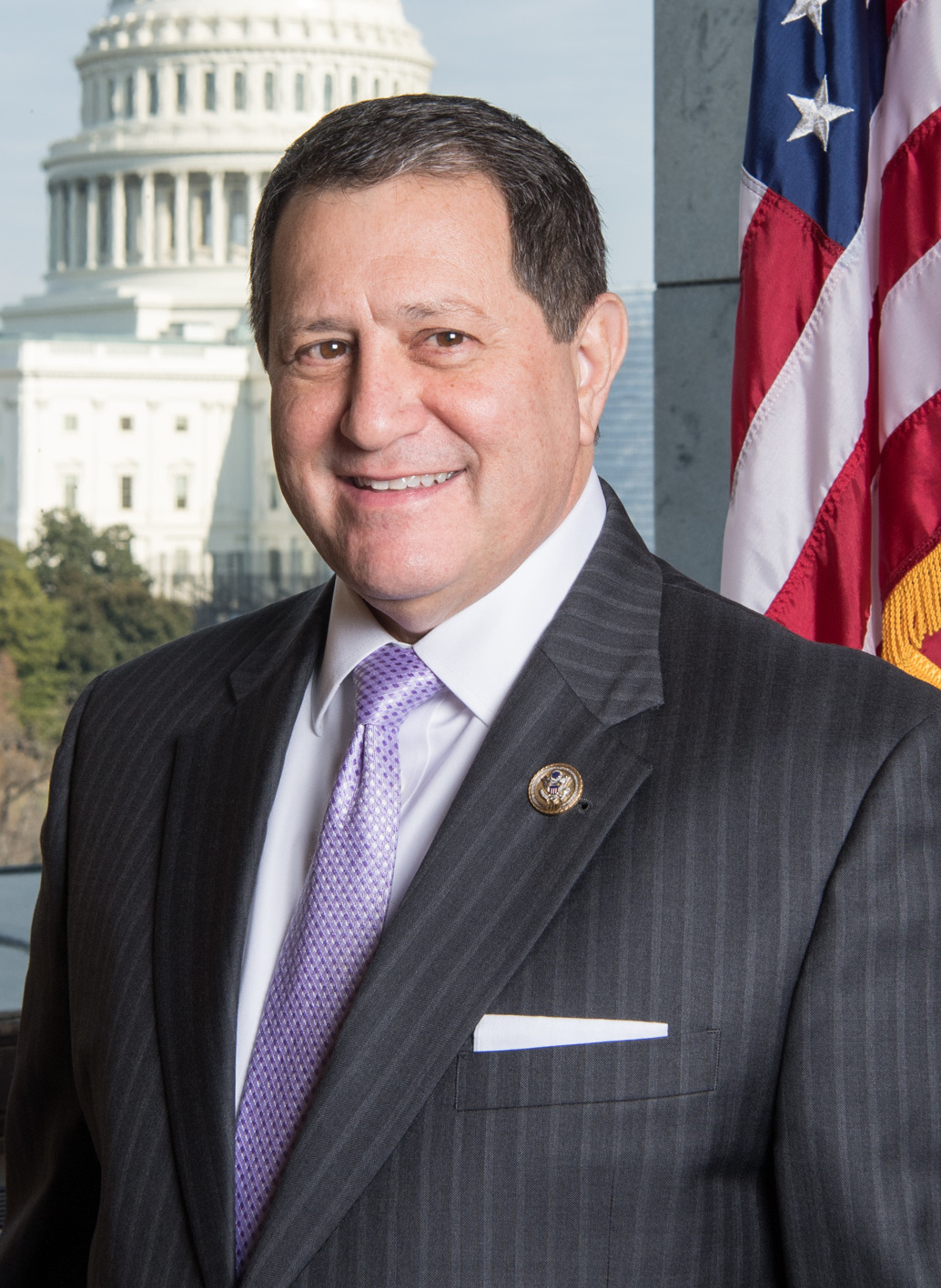
Morelle in 2018

After the death of Representative Louise Slaughter, Morelle announced his candidacy for New York's 25th congressional district; he won the Democratic Party's nomination on June 26, 2018. On November 6, he ran in two elections: a special election for the last two months of Slaughter's 16th term, and a regular election for a full two-year term. He won both, defeating Republican nominee Jim Maxwell.

==== 2020 ====
Morelle ran for reelection to a second full term, winning the Democratic primary against challenger and Brighton town councilwoman Robin Wilt. He defeated the Republican nominee, businessman George Mitris, in the general election.

==== 2022 ====
Morelle ran unopposed for reelection in the Democratic primary. He defeated Republican La'Ron Singletary in the general election, winning a third full term with 53.8% of the vote to Singletary's 46.1%.

==== 2024 ====
Morelle ran for a fourth term and defeated Republican Gregg Sadwick in the general election, winning 60.8% of the vote to Sadwick's 39.2%.

=== Tenure ===
Morelle was sworn in on November 13, 2018.

On December 2, 2024, Michael Hopkins, a congressional staffer for Morelle, was arrested after routine x-ray screens discovered 11 rounds of ammunition and several ammunition magazines in his bag. Hopkins was arrested and charged with unlawful possession of ammunition and possession of a high capacity magazine.

=== Committee assignments ===
- Committee on House Administration (Ranking member)
- Committee on Appropriations

=== Caucus memberships ===
- New Democrat Coalition
- Congressional Coalition on Adoption
- Congressional Caucus for the Equal Rights Amendment
- Congressional Equality Caucus
- Congressional Ukraine Caucus
- House Pro-Choice Caucus
- Labor Caucus
- Taiwan Caucus

== Political positions ==
Morelle voted with President Joe Biden's stated position 100% of the time in the 117th Congress, according to a FiveThirtyEight analysis.

In 2025, Morelle was one of 46 House Democrats who joined all Republicans to vote for the Laken Riley Act.

=== Leadership call to discuss Biden ===
On July 7, 2024, it was reported that Morelle had expressed interest in encouraging Biden to end his bid for re-election. This was during a call that U.S. House minority leader Hakeem Jeffries held with the committee leaders.

== Electoral history ==
Democratic primary results
Party	Candidate	Votes	%
Democratic	Joseph Morelle	16,245	45.63%
Democratic	Rachel Barnhart	7,003	19.67%
Democratic	Robin Wilt	6,158	17.30%
Democratic	Adam McFadden	6,103	17.14%

New York's 25th congressional district special election, 2018
Party	Candidate	Votes	%	±%
Democratic	Joseph Morelle	141,290	58.29%	+2.10%
Republican	Jim Maxwell	101,085	41.71%	−2.10%
Total votes		242,375	100.0	N/A
Democratic hold				

New York's 25th congressional district, 2018
Party	Candidate	Votes	%
Democratic	Joseph Morelle	147,979	54.81%
Independence	Joseph Morelle	4,585	1.70%
Working Families	Joseph Morelle	4,575	1.69%
Women's Equality	Joseph Morelle	2,105	0.78%
Total	Joseph Morelle (incumbent)	159,244	58.98%
Republican	Jim Maxwell	91,342	33.83%
Conservative	Jim Maxwell	17,781	6.59%
Reform	Jim Maxwell	1,613	0.60%
Total	Jim Maxwell	110,736	41.02%
Total votes		269,980	100.0
Democratic hold			

New York's 25th congressional district, 2020
Party	Candidate	Votes	%
Democratic	Joseph Morelle	187,503	53.89%
Working Families	Joseph Morelle	14,584	4.19%
Independence	Joseph Morelle	4,309	1.24%
Total	Joseph Morelle (incumbent)	206,396	59.32%
Republican	George Mitris	115,940	33.32%
Conservative	George Mitris	20,258	5.82%
Total	George Mitris	136,198	39.15%
Libertarian	Kevin Wilson	5,325	1.53%
Total votes		347,919	100.0
Democratic hold			

New York's 25th congressional district, 2022
Party	Candidate	Votes	%
Democratic	Joseph Morelle	136,788	48.88%
Working Families	Joseph Morelle	11,893	4.25%
Total	Joseph Morelle (incumbent)	148,681	53.13%
Republican	La'Ron Singletary	106,573	38.08%
Conservative	La'Ron Singletary	21,929	7.84%
Total	La'Ron Singletary	128,502	45.92%
Total votes		279,841	100.0

New York's 25th congressional district, 2024
Party	Candidate	Votes	%
Democratic	Joseph Morelle	200,507	55.64%
Working Families	Joseph Morelle	18,668	5.18%
Total	Joseph Morelle (incumbent)	219,175	60.82%
Republican	Gregg Sadwick	141,195	39.18%
Total votes		360,370	100.0

== Personal life ==
Morelle lives in Irondequoit with his wife, Mary Beth. They have three children.

New York State Assembly
Preceded by Ronald Canestrari	Majority Leader of the New York Assembly; 2013–2018	Succeeded by Crystal Peoples-Stokes
Political offices
Preceded by Sheldon Silver	Speaker of the New York Assembly; Acting; 2015	Succeeded by Carl Heastie
U.S. House of Representatives
Preceded by Louise Slaughter	Member of the U.S. House of Representatives from New York's 25th congressional district 2018–present	Incumbent
U.S. order of precedence (ceremonial)
Preceded by Kevin Hern	United States representatives by seniority 185th	Succeeded by Mary Gay Scanlon
