= Cito Culver =

American baseball player (born 1992)

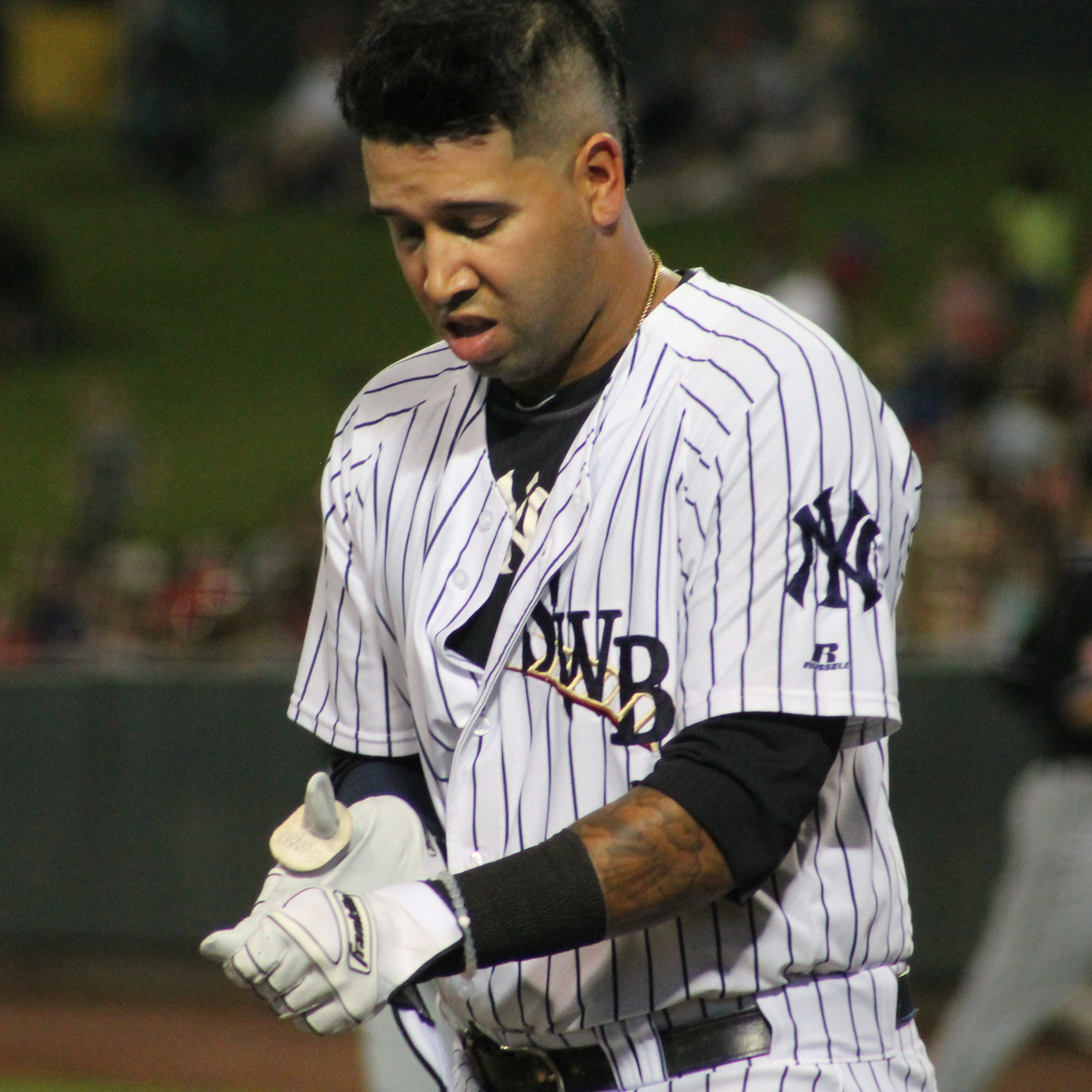
- Culver with the Scranton/Wilkes-Barre RailRiders in 2016
- Shortstop
- Born: August 26, 1992 (age 34); Rochester, New York, U.S.
- Bats: Switch Throws: Right
- Stats at Baseball Reference

Christopher S. "Cito" Culver (born August 26, 1992) is an American former professional baseball shortstop. He was drafted by the New York Yankees in the first round of the 2010 Major League Baseball draft.

== Career ==
Culver attended Irondequoit High School in Irondequoit, New York, a suburb of Rochester. He played little league for Irondequoit Athletic Association.

=== New York Yankees ===
Culver was selected by the New York Yankees with their first-round pick, 32nd overall, in the 2010 MLB draft. While he had already committed to play college baseball for the University of Maryland, he passed on his commitment and instead signed a contract reportedly worth $954,000 with the Yankees. He made his professional debut that season for the Gulf Coast Yankees. He was later promoted to the Staten Island Yankees. Overall in 56 games, Culver hit .251/.325/.330 with two home runs and 18 RBI.

Culver spent the entire 2011 season with Staten Island, posting a slash line of .250/.323/.337 with two home runs and 33 RBI in 69 games. In 2012, he played for the Charleston RiverDogs, batting .215/.321/.283 with two home runs and 40 RBI in 122 games. Culver decided to stick to batting right-handed rather than switch hitting prior to the 2013 season. He started the season back with Charleston. In August, he was promoted to the Tampa Yankees. Overall, he hit .248/.322/.362 with nine home runs and 34 RBI in 120 games. He remained with Tampa for the 2014 season and in 132 games, he batted .220/.298/.303 with five home runs, 48 RBI, and 12 steals, playing 130 of the games at shortstop while serving as the DH the other two. Culver spent 2015 with both the Trenton Thunder and the Scranton/Wilkes-Barre RailRiders, where he posted a combined .207 batting average with three home runs and 30 RBI in 114 combined games between both teams.

In 2016, Culver also split time between the Thunder and the RailRiders, where he batted .254 with four home runs and 51 RBI in 117 games. He elected free agency following the season on November 7, 2016. On December 10, 2016, Culver re–signed with the Yankees organization on a minor league contract. He played his final season in the Yankees organization in 2017, batting .224 with 12 home runs and 48 RBI in 103 games with the RailRiders. Culver elected free agency after the season on November 6, 2017.

=== Miami Marlins ===
On January 9, 2018, Culver signed a minor league contract with the Miami Marlins. He split the season between the Double–A Jacksonville Jumbo Shrimp and Triple–A New Orleans Baby Cakes, playing in 69 games and hitting .227/.299/.314 with 4 home runs and 27 RBI. Culver elected free agency following the season on November 2.

=== Sussex County Miners ===
On February 8, 2019, Culver signed with the Rockland Boulders of the independent Can-Am League. On June 14, he was claimed off waivers by the Sussex County Miners of the Can-Am League. Culver was signed to a contract extension by the Miners on January 8, 2020.

=== Fargo-Moorhead RedHawks ===
On February 21, 2020, Culver was traded to the Kansas City T-Bones of the American Association of Independent Professional Baseball. The T-Bones were not selected to compete in the condensed 60-game season due to the COVID-19 pandemic. He was later drafted by the Fargo-Moorhead RedHawks in the 2020 dispersal draft. Culver was released by the RedHawks on July 18.

=== Sussex County Miners (second stint) ===
On November 27, 2020, Culver signed with the Sussex County Miners of the Frontier League. In 2021, Culver played in 95 games for Sussex County, slashing .275/.373/.405 with 7 home runs, 45 RBI, and 5 stolen bases. He played in 50 games for the team in 2022, but struggled to a .196/.344/.294 slash with 2 home runs and 18 RBI.

=== Tri-City ValleyCats ===
On July 18, 2022, Culver was claimed off waivers by the Tri-City ValleyCats of the Frontier League. He played in 37 games for Tri-City to close out the year, hitting .329/.413/.557 with 6 home runs, 18 RBI, and 3 stolen bases.

Culver signed a contract extension with the ValleyCats before the 2023 season. In 95 games for the team in 2023, he batted .299/.402/.443 with 12 home runs, 53 RBI, and 15 stolen bases.

=== Mumbai Cobras ===
Culver was drafted in October 2023 by the Mumbai Cobras in the inaugural draft of Baseball United.

=== Hagerstown Flying Boxcars ===
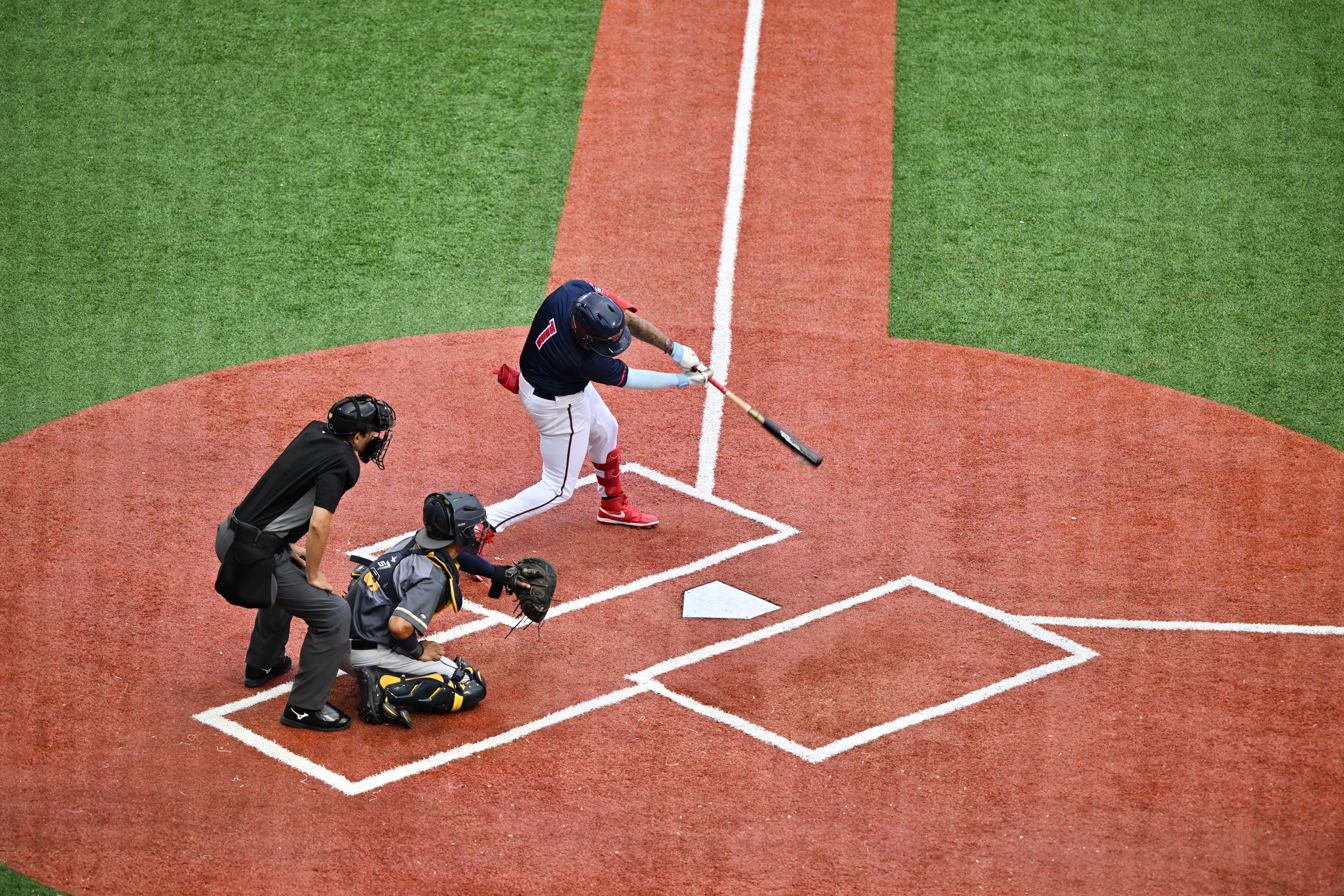
Culver with the Hagerstown Flying Boxcars in 2024

On November 17, 2023, Culver and Trey Hair were traded to the Cleburne Railroaders of the American Association of Professional Baseball in exchange for two players to be named later. On March 22, 2024, Culver officially signed with the Railroaders. However, on May 8, Culver was released by the Railroaders.

On May 15, 2024, Culver signed with the Hagerstown Flying Boxcars of the Atlantic League of Professional Baseball. In 105 games for Hagerstown, he slashed .273/.350/.421 with 14 home runs and 57 RBI. Culver became a free agent following the season.

=== Tigres de Quintana Roo ===
On January 7, 2025, Culver signed with the Tigres de Quintana Roo of the Mexican League. Culver was released by Quintana Roo on April 11. He has since announced his retirement from professional baseball after a 15-year career.

== Personal ==
Culver grew up a fan of the Yankees and Derek Jeter. His father served nine years in Attica Correctional Facility for attempting to set his family's house on fire on March 22, 2008. He was later diagnosed with bipolar disorder. By terms of the plea agreement, Culver can have no contact with his father.
