= West Irondequoit Central School District =

School district in New York, United States

Location
- 321 List Ave; Rochester, NY 14617 Rochester, New York, Monroe County, New York, 14617; United States
- Coordinates: 43.2165°N 77.5932°W

District information
- Type: Public
- Motto: Peak performance
- Grades: Pre-K-12 and adult education
- Established: July 1953
- Superintendent: Dr. Aaron Johnson
- Asst. superintendent(s): James Brennan, Dr. Brenna Farrell, Christina Miga
- Schools: Six elementary schools (K–3); Two middle schools (4–6); One junior high school (7–8); One senior high school (9–12)
- Budget: US$105.6 million (2026–2027)
- NCES District ID: 3615390

Students and staff
- Students: 3457 (2026–2027)
- Teachers: 274 (2018–2019)
- Staff: 345 (2018–2019)

Other information
- Unions: NYSUT, West Irondequoit Teachers' Association
- Website: www.westirondequoit.org

The West Irondequoit Central School District is a public school district in New York State that serves approximately 4000 students in the western half of the town of Irondequoit in Monroe County, with over 600 employees and an operating budget of $82.4 million (~$20,319 per student).

The average class size is 21 students and the student-teacher ratio is 13.6:1(elementary), 13.6:1(middle-high school).

The District motto is "Peak Performance".

Dr. Aaron Johnson is the Superintendent of Schools.

== History ==
A high school building was erected in 1924 as the Irondequoit Free Union School, District Number 3. In 1953, District Number 3 and District Number 4 combined to become the West Irondequoit Central School District.

Superintendents
| Name | Tenure |
|---|---|
| Alfred C. Hamilton | – 1944 |
| Franklyn S. Barry | 1945 – 1947 |
| Floyd B. Rasbach | 1948 – 1960 |
| Earle W. Helmer | – 1973 |
| William J. Early | |
| Joseph R. Sproule | – |
| Glenn F. Wachter | 1996 – 2003 |
| Jeffrey B. Crane | November 1, 2003 – December 31, 2018 |
| Jon Hunter (interim) | January 1, 2019 - March 5, 2019 |
| Aaron Johnson | March 6, 2019 – present |

== Board of education ==
The Board of Education (BOE) consists of 7 members who serve rotating 3-year terms. Elections are held each May for board members and to vote on the School District Budget. Student representatives, elected by the student body for 1-year terms, also attend BOE meetings; their vote is unofficial.

Current board members are:

- Matthew Sullivan, President
- Kathryn Copeland, Vice President
- Gary Adams
- Melissa Borher
- Kevin Schoepfel
- John Vay
- Tamara Wall

== Schools ==
To improve K-3 achievement, the administration of the elementary schools changed in July 2007 one principal per school to one principal for each pair of schools: Briarwood/Colebrook, Brookview/Seneca and Listwood/Southlawn.

=== Elementary school ===
- Briarwood Elementary School (K-3), Principal - Jennifer DeWitz
- Brookview Elementary School (K-3), Principal - Alicia Spitz
- Colebrook Elementary School (K-3), Principal - Jennifer DeWitz
- Listwood Elementary School (K-3), Principal - Jake Shirley
- Seneca Elementary (K-3), Principal - Alicia Spitz
- Southlawn Elementary (K-3), Principal - Jake Shirley

=== Middle school ===
- Iroquois Middle School (4-6), Principal - Christian Zwahlen
- Rogers Middle School (4-6), Principal - Nicholas DiMartino

=== High school ===
- Dake Junior High School (7-8), Principal - Tim Baker
- Irondequoit High School (9-12), Principal - Alecia Zipp-McLaughlin
