= Irondequoit High School =

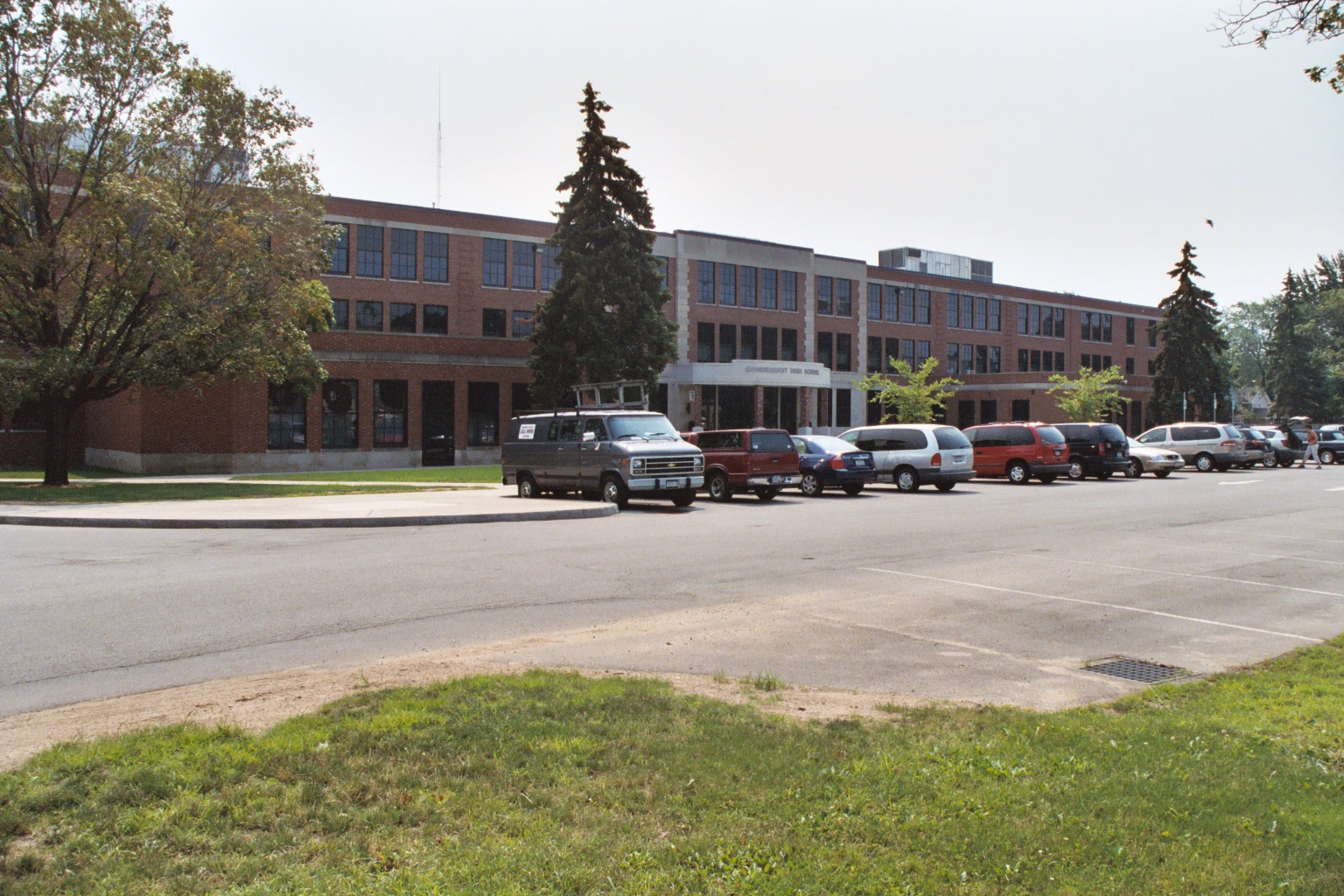
- Irondequoit High School 2006

Location
- 260 Cooper Road; Rochester, New York 14617; United States
- Coordinates: 43°13′00″N 77°35′49″W

Information
- Type: Public high school
- School district: West Irondequoit Central School District
- Principal: Alecia Zipp-McLaughlin
- Teaching staff: 99.52 (FTE)
- Grades: 9-12
- Enrollment: 1,177 (2023–2024)
- Student to teacher ratio: 11.83
- Campus: Suburban
- Colors: Blue and gold
- Nickname: Eagles
- Rival: East Irondequoit Lancers
- Newspaper: News-Rodequoit
- Yearbook: Neodaondaquat
- Website: ihs.westirondequoit.org

Irondequoit High School (IHS) is a co-educational public school in Rochester, New York in the suburb of Irondequoit, New York. It was founded in 1924 as a part of the current West Irondequoit Central School District.

== History ==
Irondequoit District Number 3 renamed their original Irondequoit Union Free School as Irondequoit High School in 1924. A larger property, the Williams farm, was bought on Cooper Road in 1927 for $72,000. By 1931 a middle school - Reuben A. Dake School - had been built on the Cooper Road site. A new high school was built just to the south in 1949-1950 for $1,000,000. The building was dedicated on October 26, 1950. The high school building was erected in 1924, as the Irondequoit Free Union School, District Number 3. This district was joined to District Number 4 in 1953 to become the West Irondequoit Central School District.

Additions:

The high school was enlarged in 1957 at a cost of $1,750,000: 25 regular classrooms were added; music rooms for band, chorus and orchestra; a library; two art rooms; a cafeteria for 500 students; a pool (and locker room); and enlarged offices. The highschool was as well involved in adding extra bathrooms. So too many were not being used at one time. In 1961 another $28,000 was spent to connect the cafeteria with the south end of the 1957 wing.

As the town continued to grow, more classrooms were needed. Twenty-six more were added, as well as a 300-student cafeteria, rooms for shop classes, and more locker rooms and shower rooms for athletics. To match this expansion in school attendance, the kitchen, library, chemistry and biology labs, and offices were expanded. All of this cost $1,602,650. The new space was occupied at the start of the 1964–1965 school year.

More recently in the summer of 2020, the district went forward with the “Capital Project”. This started with a new $9,600,000 basketball and volleyball court in the school’s gym. The school also had an upgrade to the entrance completely renovating. They made changes to the music rooms, nurse’s office, bathrooms, main office, locker rooms, roof and electrical panel. Many other changes were added across the West Irondequoit Central School District as well, more importantly to the neighbouring Dake Junior High School which was renovated as well.

== Demographics ==
Statistics from the Department of Education:

- Total Students(2004–2005): 1393
- Full-time teachers: 87.4
- Student/Teacher Ratio: 15.9
- Eligible for discounted/free lunch: 204 ( 15%)

== Athletics ==
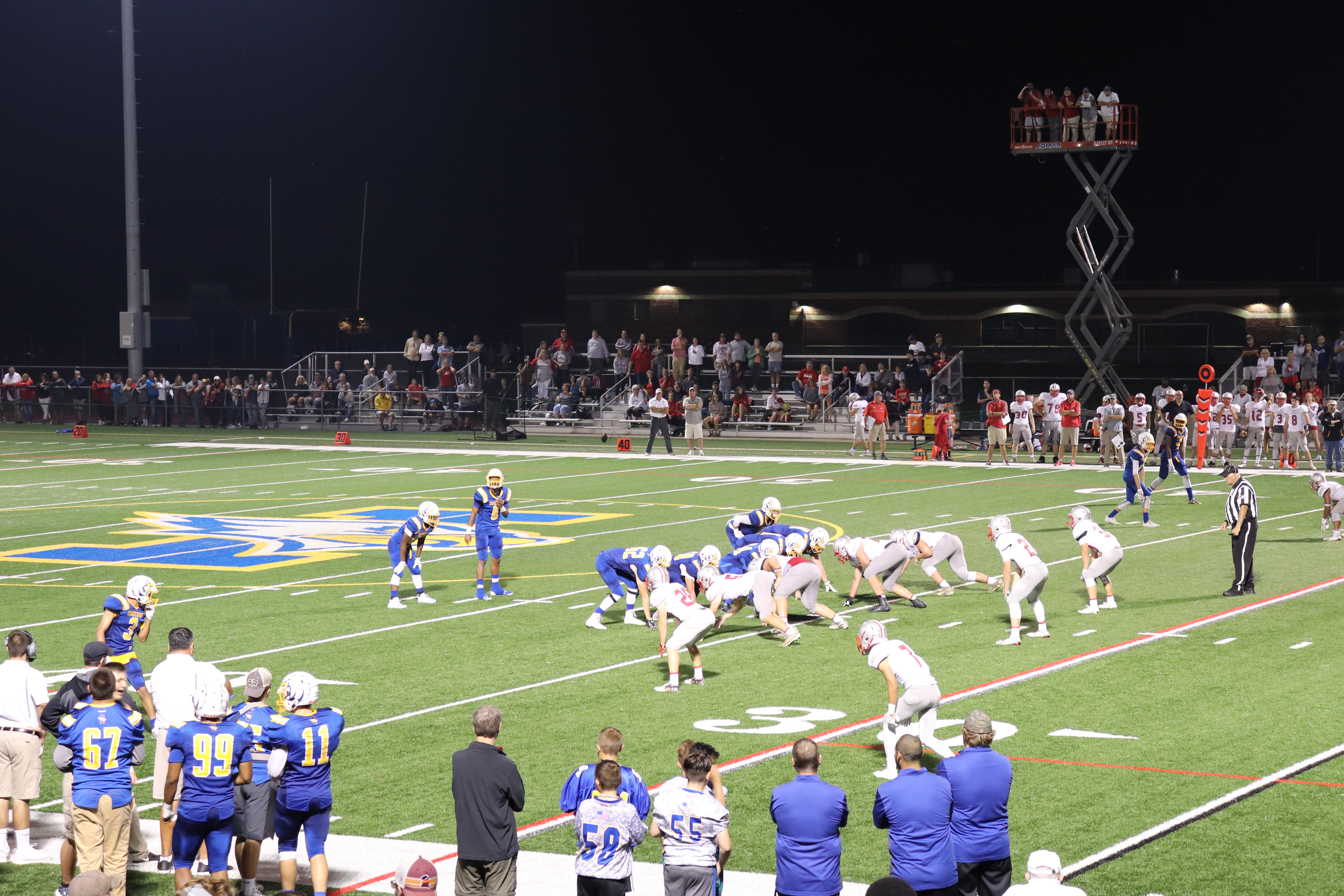
The Irondequoit High School Eagles face off against the Canandaigua Braves at Gordon Allen Field.

Irondequoit High School is a member of Section 5 of the New York State Public High School Athletic Association. The school has varsity through modified teams for the fall, winter, and spring under the nickname Irondequoit Eagles. As of 2023, Irondequoit participates in football, soccer, volleyball, tennis (for females), cross country, and field hockey in the fall; basketball, Nordic skiing, snow-sports club, bowling, ice hockey, cheerleading, swimming and diving, and indoor track and field in the winter; and lacrosse, baseball, track and field, tennis (men's), and softball in the spring.

Irondequoit is known for its lacrosse team, which has been one of the most successful programs in the state. The boys' varsity lacrosse team has had a losing record just twice (2017, 2020) in over 25 years of play.

== Notable alumni ==
- Robert H. Babcock (class of 1949), labor historian
- Richard Brookhiser (class of 1973), historian and biographer
- Paul Cantabene, professional lacrosse player and coach
- Cito Culver, first-round draft choice of the New York Yankees in 2010
- Thomas Fenton, screenwriter
- Rory Fitzpatrick, professional hockey player
- Glenn Frankel, Pulitzer Prize winning Journalist and NYT bestselling author
- Tom Golisano, founder of Paychex and a three-time New York State gubernatorial candidate
- Don Megerle, International Hall of Fame swim coach for Tufts University from 1972-2005. He swam for Irondequoit in the 1950's and then Bethany College.
- Sean Lahman, journalist and writer
- Stephen Minarik, former head of the Monroe County and New York State Republican Committees
- Mike Sigel, billiards player
- Kent Syverud, chancellor and president of Syracuse University
- David Walker, star running back at Syracuse University and assistant coach for the Chicago Bears
- Joe Walters, professional lacrosse player
- David Wiegand, journalist and writer
