= Irondequoit, New York =

Town in New York, United States

- Town
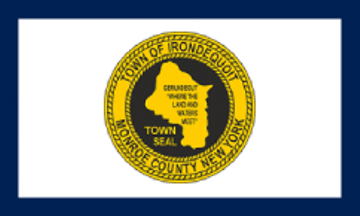
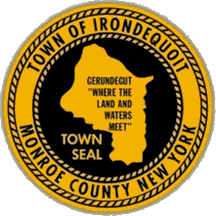
- Flag Seal
- Motto: "A Town for a Lifetime"
- Location in Monroe County and the state of New York

- Location of New York in the United States
- Coordinates: 43°12′40″N 77°34′55″W
- Country: United States
- State: New York
- County: Monroe
- Founded: March 27, 1839; 187 years ago

Government
  - Town supervisor: John Perticone (D)

Area
  - Total: 16.83 sq mi (43.6 km^{2})
  - Land: 15.02 sq mi (38.9 km^{2})
  - Water: 1.81 sq mi (4.7 km^{2})
- Elevation: 368 ft (112 m)

Population (2020)
  - Total: 51,043
  - Estimate (2024): 50,380 ▼
  - Density: 3,355.1/sq mi (1,295.4/km^{2})
- Time zone: UTC-5 (EST)
  - Summer (DST): UTC-4 (EDT)
- ZIP Codes: 14609, 14617, 14622 (Irondequoit); 14621 (Rochester)
- Area code: 585
- FIPS code: 36-055-37726
- Website: www.irondequoit.gov

Irondequoit (/ɪˈrɒndəkɔɪt/) is a town (and census-designated place) in Monroe County, New York, United States. As of the 2020 census, the coterminous town-CDP had a population of 51,043. Irondequoit is a suburb of the city of Rochester, lying just north and east of the city limits. The name is of Haudenosaunee origin and means "where the land meets the water".

== History ==
In 1687 the Marquis de Denonville led an army of French soldiers and Wyandot warriors on a punitive expedition against the Haudenosaunee through Irondequoit Bay, beginning the long enmity between the Haudenosaunee and the French.

After the American Revolution, this area was part of the Phelps and Gorham Purchase. The Town of Irondequoit was founded in 1839 when it separated from the town of Brighton.

During the last part of the 19th century, the north edge of the town was developed as a tourist and vacation area for Rochester residents, and was once known as the "Coney Island of Western New York".

After World War II, Irondequoit experienced significant population growth, with returning veterans looking for housing. Irondequoit became the first suburb in Monroe County to see substantial migration of residents from the city of Rochester, with the population growing from 23,376 in 1940 to 55,337 in 1960, an increase of 136%. Irondequoit remained the most-populated suburb in Monroe County until the 1970s, when it was surpassed by the town of Greece, a community with three times the land area of Irondequoit.

In 1965, Irondequoit became part of civil rights history by being part of the first totally voluntary desegregation program in U.S. history. The Urban Suburban Interdistrict Transfer Program, which still operates today, was begun with 25 first graders from the inner city of Rochester who embarked on their K-12 education in the West Irondequoit school district. Ultimately, 15 of the original 25 students graduated together in 1977 as part of the first graduating class ever to go through a full 12 years of voluntary desegregation. The achievement was acknowledged in a letter from the White House and a notation in the U.S. Congressional Record. The program has continued to expand and now includes additional suburban districts that are part of the Rochester metropolitan area.

In 1991, Irondequoit established a sister city relationship with Poltava, in Ukraine. Poltava is an Eastern Ukrainian city once known as "the Soul of Ukraine". The initiative was spearheaded by Irondequoit Town Supervisor Fred Lapple. His appointed committee chair, Tamara Denysenko, identified Poltava, Ukraine as Irondequoit's chosen Sister City.

== Geography ==
The town is in north-central Monroe County, lying between the Genesee River on the west and Irondequoit Bay on the east. The north border of the town is defined by the shoreline of Lake Ontario. Because it is bounded by water on three sides, it is considered a geographical headland. Irondequoit is bordered by the city of Rochester to the south and west, the town of Brighton at Irondequoit's southeast corner, and the towns of Penfield and Webster to the east. The eastern boundary of the town follows the center of Irondequoit Bay from the mouth of Irondequoit Creek north to Lake Ontario.

An unusual boundary exists between the Town of Irondequoit and the adjacent City of Rochester. On the western border of Irondequoit, the city limits include a thin strip of land that extends northward along the east bank of the Genesee River from Seneca Park to Lake Ontario, at some points less than 50 yards (46 m) from the shore. The result is that the City of Rochester claims the entire eastern shore of the Genesee, and the border of the Town of Irondequoit never reaches the river.

Similarly, the northern half of Durand-Eastman Park (including Durand Beach) is part of the City of Rochester, along with a narrow strip running along Culver Road for approximately 5 miles (8.0 km) southward to Norton Street, where it connects to the main part of Rochester. This leads to much confusion, even among long-term residents, about whether places such as Seneca Park or Durand Park lie within the Town of Irondequoit or the City of Rochester. Seneca Park was annexed by the City of Rochester in 1891, and Durand Eastman Park was given to the city in 1908.

According to the U.S. Census Bureau, the town of Irondequoit has a total area of 16.8 sq mi (44 km^{2}), of which 15.0 sq mi (39 km^{2}) are land and 1.8 sq mi (4.7 km^{2}), or 10.75%, are water.

== Demographics ==
Historical population
Census	Pop.	Note	%±
1840	1,252		—
1850	2,397		91.5%
1860	3,547		48.0%
1870	3,990		12.5%
1880	1,986		−50.2%
1890	2,415		21.6%
1900	2,863		18.6%
1910	3,526		23.2%
1920	5,123		45.3%
1930	18,024		251.8%
1940	23,376		29.7%
1950	34,417		47.2%
1960	55,337		60.8%
1970	64,897		17.3%
1980	57,648		−11.2%
1990	52,377		−9.1%
2000	52,354		0.0%
2010	51,692		−1.3%
2020	51,043		−1.3%
2024 (est.)	50,380	▼	−1.3%
U.S. Decennial Census

As of the census of 2020, there were 51,043 people, 22,471 households, and 17,752 families residing in the coterminous town-CDP. The population density was 3,355.1 inhabitants per square mile (1,295.4/km^{2}). There were 23,502 housing units at an average density of 1,564.71 per square mile (604.14/km^{2}). The racial makeup of the town was 76.30% White (74.10% Non-Hispanic white), 8.40% Black or African American, 0.21% Native American, 3.10% Asian, 0.0% Pacific Islander, 2.9% other races, and 9.05% from two or more races. Hispanic or Latino of any race were 11.20% of the population.

There were 22,471 households, out of which 57.9% were married couples living together, 16.5% had a female householder with no husband present, 4.7% had a male householder with no wife present, and 20.9% were non-families. The average household size was 2.22.

In the town, the population was spread out, with 19.9% under the age of 18, 7.6% from 15 to 24, 27.2% from 25 to 44, 25.4% from 45 to 64, and 22.6% who were 65 years of age or older. The median age was 43.3 years. For every 100 females, there were 88.1 males. For every 100 females age 18 and over, there were 83.1 males.

The median income for a household in the town was $79,162, and the median income for a family was $103,916. Males had a median income of $64,933 versus $50,069 for females. The per capita income for the town was $44,541. About 5.3% of families and 9.2% of the population were below the poverty line, including 14% of those under age 18 and 9% of those age 65 or over.

== Government ==
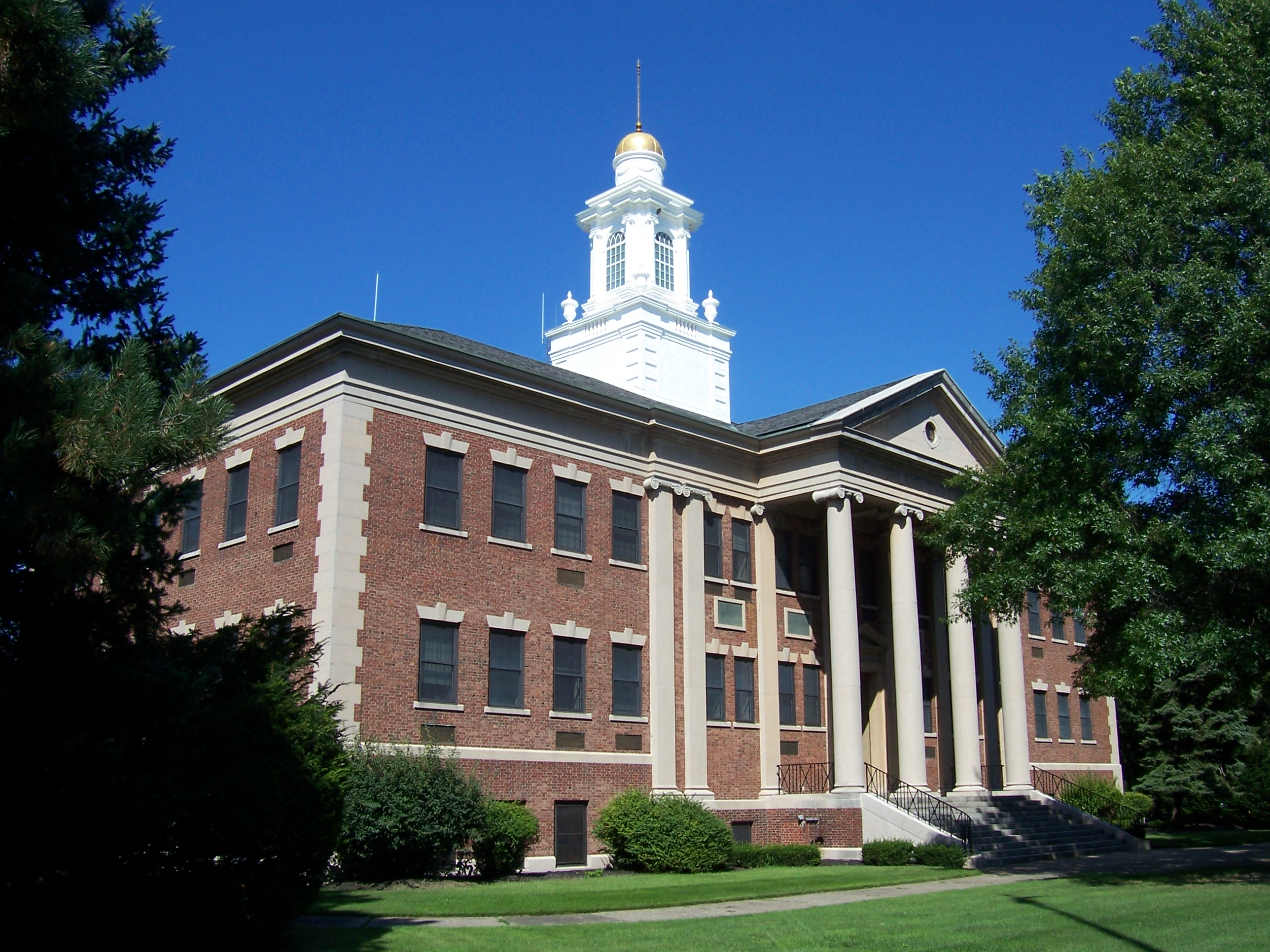
Irondequoit town hall

Irondequoit is governed by a Town Board consisting of a Supervisor and four councilpersons. All members of the Town Board serve the entire town, and are elected at-large by voters. The Supervisor serves a two-year term, while councilpersons serve a four-year term.

Irondequoit is known for its colonial-style Town Hall, built in 1951. It was completed with funds that had been previously set aside for two decades. It was listed on the historical registry in 2010 by the Irondequoit Historical Preservation Commission.

Current members of the Town Board

- Supervisor: John Perticone (Democrat)
- Councilperson: Ann Cunningham (Democrat)
- Councilperson: Peter Wehner (Democrat)
- Councilperson: Grant Malone (Democrat)
- Councilperson: Vacant

Supervisors
Name	Tenure	Name	Tenure
William Shepherd	1839 – 1840, 1842	Joseph Aman	September 24, 1900 – 1905
William Blossom	1841	Chauncey W. Porter	1906 – 1909, 1920 – 1925
Jonah Brown	1843 – 1844	Louis Dubelbeiss	1910 – 1919
John McGonegal	1845 – 1846	William S. Titus	1926 – 1927
James Mandeville	1847	Thomas E. Broderick	1928 – October 1, 1949
James Swayne	1848 – 1849, 1856 – 1857	Frederick Hussey	October 2, 1949 – December 31, 1949, 1958 – 1959
Benjamin Wing	1850	Walter G. Lauterbach	1950 – 1957
Samuel W. Bradstreet	1851 – 1852	Harold L. Knauf	1960 – May 23, 1967, 1968 – 1969
John Smyles	1853, 1858 – 1859	Julian Underhill	May 24, 1967 – December 31, 1967, 1970
James Sherry	1854 – 1855, 1863	Donald A. Deming	1972 – 1979
George McGonegal	1860 – 1861	Stephen R. Johnson	1980 – 1983
Jedediah White	1862	Eugene C. Mazzola, Jr.	1984 – 1989
Albert C. Hobbie	1864 – 1866	Frederick W. Lapple	1990 – 1993
Richard D. Cole	1867 – 1870	Suzanne Masters	1994–1995
Samuel Dubelbeiss	1871 – 1872	William S Dillon	1996 – 1997
Henry Walzer	1873 – 1876	David W. Schantz	1998–2005
Alexander H. Wilson	1877	Mary Ellen Heyman	2006 – 2009
Winfield R. Wood	1878 – 1879	Mary Joyce D'Aurizio	2010 – 2014
John Evershed	1880 – 1882	Adam Bello	2014 - 2016
Richard Hill	1883 – 1884	David Seeley	2016 – 2022
William H. Sours	1885 – 1891	Rory Fitzpatrick	2022 – 2023
John D. Whipple	1892 – 1897	Andraé Evans	2024 – 2025
Rudolph Dubelbeiss	1898 – September 11, 1900	John Perticone	2026-

== Notable people ==
The following notable people were either born in Irondequoit or were long-time residents:

- Richard Brookhiser, historian and biographer of various American founding fathers; 1973 graduate of Irondequoit High School
- Cito Culver, first-round draft pick for the New York Yankees in 2010
- Steve Gadd, drummer who has played with Paul Simon, Eric Clapton, Frank Sinatra, and others
- Tom Golisano, founder of Paychex, three-time New York State gubernatorial candidate, and owner of the Buffalo Sabres hockey team from 2003 to 2011; graduate of Irondequoit High School
- Joseph Morelle, U.S. congressman, former Majority Leader and Speaker of the New York State Assembly
- Kent Syverud, 12th chancellor and president of Syracuse University
Monument to the 100 years of Ukrainian settlement in the area – located on the grounds of the Irondequoit Town Hall

== Education ==
Irondequoit is served by the West Irondequoit and East Irondequoit central school districts.

Additionally, there are several schools with religious affiliations:

- Archangel School (Roman Catholic) operated by private individuals
- Bay Knoll School operated by the Seventh-day Adventists
- Derech Hatorah for Jewish education
- Bishop Kearney High School (independently owned) but affiliated with the Diocese of Rochester.
- Two schools operated by the Roman Catholic Diocese of Rochester:
  - Saint Kateri School
  - Saint Ambrose Academy

Irondequoit is also the home of satellite campuses of two institutions of higher learning:

- Empire State University's Genesee Valley Learning Center
- Everest Institute's Rochester campus
