= Gates-North Gates, New York =

- Former CDP
- Location within the state of New York
- Coordinates: 43°09′59″N 077°41′54″W
- Country: United States
- State: New York
- County: Monroe County
- Town: Town of Gates

Area (2000 Census)
  - Total: 4.695 sq mi (12.16 km^{2})
  - Land: 4.654 sq mi (12.05 km^{2})
  - Water: 0.041 sq mi (0.11 km^{2})

Population (2000)
  - Total: 15,138
- Time zone: UTC-5 (Eastern (EST))
  - Summer (DST): UTC-4 (EDT)
- ZIP Code: 14606, 14624
- Area code: 585
- FIPS code: 36-28458

Gates-North Gates was a census-designated place (CDP) in the Town of Gates, in Monroe County, New York, United States. The population was 15,138 at the 2000 census. For the 2010 census, the CDP was split into two separate entities: Gates (pop. 4,910) and North Gates (pop. 9,512).

== Geography ==
Gates-North Gates was located at 43°9′59″N 77°41′54″W (43.166295, -77.698275).

According to the 2000 United States census, the CDP had a total area of 4.695 square miles (12.16 km^{2}), of which 4.654 square miles (12.05 km^{2}) was land and 0.041 square miles (0.11 km^{2}), or 0.87%, was water.

== Demographics ==
Historical population
Census	Pop.	Note	%±
1980	15,244		—
1990	14,995		−1.6%
2000	15,138		1.0%

As of the census of 2000, there were 15,138 people, 6,202 households, and 4,142 families residing in the CDP. The population density was 3,252.5 inhabitants per square mile (1,255.8/km^{2}). There were 6,361 housing units at an average density of 1,366.7 per square mile (527.7/km^{2}). The racial makeup of the CDP was 87.86% White, 6.14% African American, 0.17% Native American, 2.81% Asian, 0.03% Pacific Islander, 1.46% from other races, and 1.53% from two or more races. Hispanic or Latino of any race were 3.28% of the population.

There were 6,202 households, out of which 28.5% had children under the age of 18 living with them, 51.1% were married couples living together, 11.5% had a female householder with no husband present, and 33.2% were non-families. 28.6% of all households were made up of individuals, and 12.7% had someone living alone who was 65 years of age or older. The average household size was 2.44 and the average family size was 3.00.

In the CDP, the population was spread out, with 22.9% under the age of 18, 7.0% from 18 to 24, 29.6% from 25 to 44, 23.1% from 45 to 64, and 17.5% who were 65 years of age or older. The median age was 39 years. For every 100 females, there were 91.5 males. For every 100 females age 18 and over, there were 87.3 males.

The median income for a household in the CDP was $42,010, and the median income for a family was $51,661. Males had a median income of $37,791 versus $29,248 for females. The per capita income for the CDP is $20,027. About 5.5% of families and 6.8% of the population were below the poverty line, including 7.6% of those under the age of 18 and 7.0% of those ages 65 or older.
