= New York State Route 33 =

State highway in western New York, US

New York State Route 33
- Map of western New York with NY 33 highlighted in red and associated reference routes in blue

Route information
- Maintained by NYSDOT and the cities of Batavia and Rochester
- Length: 69.26 mi (111.46 km)
- Existed: mid-1920s–present

Major junctions
- West end: NY 5 in Buffalo
- NY 198 in Buffalo; I-90 / New York Thruway in Cheektowaga; NY 5 / NY 63 / NY 98 in Batavia; I-490 / NY 531 in Gates
- East end: NY 31 in Rochester

Location
- Country: United States
- State: New York
- Counties: Erie, Genesee, Monroe

Highway system
- New York Highways; Interstate; US; State; Reference; Parkways
← NY 32B	→ NY 33A

New York State Route 33 (NY 33) is an east–west state highway in western New York in the United States. The route extends for just under 70 miles (113 km) from NY 5 in Buffalo in the west to NY 31 in Rochester in the east. It is the only state highway that directly connects both cities, although it is rarely used today for that purpose. The westernmost 10 miles (16 km) of NY 33 in Buffalo and the neighboring town of Cheektowaga have been upgraded into the Kensington Expressway. This section of NY 33 is one of several freeways leading out of downtown and serves as a main route to the Buffalo Niagara International Airport.

On the Rochester end, NY 33 primarily serves as a paralleling local route to Interstate 490 (I-490), of less importance to the area's traffic patterns. Between the two cities, it is mostly a rural two-lane highway. The largest location on this stretch is the Genesee County city of Batavia, where NY 33 reconnects to NY 5 and crosses NY 63 and NY 98, two regionally important north–south highways. NY 33 overlaps with all three routes at one point or another as it traverses Batavia. A southerly alternate route, designated NY 33A, leaves NY 33 northeast of Batavia in Bergen and rejoins its parent in Rochester.

NY 33 was assigned in the mid-1920s, but only to the portion of its modern routing between Batavia and Rochester. It was extended on both ends—to Buffalo in the west and Marion in the east—as part of the 1930 renumbering of state highways in New York; however, the eastern extension was eliminated in 1949. In Buffalo, NY 33 was moved onto the Kensington Expressway in the mid-1960s, and its former surface routing along Genesee Street subsequently became the short-lived New York State Route 33B. Smaller realignments in the years since have moved NY 33's western terminus from the heart of downtown Buffalo to the northern fringe of the city's center.

== Route description ==
Most of NY 33, including the entirety of the highway in Erie County, is state-maintained; however, two sections—from NY 5 to the eastern Batavia city line and all of NY 33 within the city of Rochester—are maintained by the cities of Batavia and Rochester, respectively.

=== Kensington Expressway ===
The Kensington Expressway was constructed in 1958, in the place of the Humboldt Parkway, and radically changed the nature of majority-Black neighborhoods on the east-side of Buffalo.

Names of Humboldt Parkway residents in 1940, 1950, 1960, 1970, and 1980 are available tracing the demographics of the parkway in federal censuses, pre and post highway.

The highway begins as two one-way streets, Goodell Street (traveling west) and East Tupper Street (traveling east). Both intersect with NY 5 (Ellicott Street) in Buffalo, from where they serve as a one-way couplet for three blocks before they merge to become the Kensington Expressway, a freeway. It initially travels through dense urban areas by way of a cut, in which both roadways are separated only by a Jersey barrier. The expressway runs past the Buffalo Museum of Science, located at Martin Luther King, Jr. Park, and through the middle of Humboldt Parkway in Buffalo, where the Scajaquada Expressway (NY 198) leaves at the former exit for Main Street. The section of the expressway between the Scajaquada and Harlem Road (NY 240) just outside the city limit is the busiest on all of NY 33, handling in excess of 100,000 vehicles per day in areas.

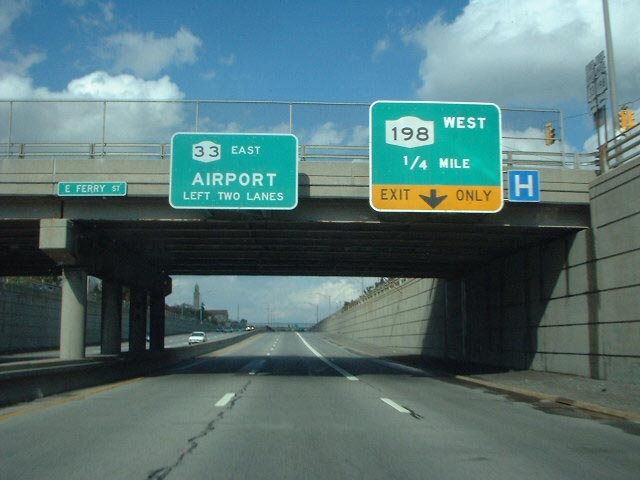
Approaching NY 198 on NY 33 eastbound in Buffalo

East of NY 198, the road becomes more open as it passes through neighborhoods with a more suburban residential feel to them. Along this stretch, NY 33 connects to several streets, including Bailey Avenue (U.S. Route 62 or US 62) and Harlem Road (NY 240). Past Harlem Road, the expressway makes a slight curve to the south as it prepares to meet a toll-free section of the New York State Thruway (I-90) at a cloverleaf interchange. Beyond I-90, the expressway veers to the south again, traversing an S-curve before connecting to Union Road (NY 277) by way of a partial interchange. After another 0.5 miles (0.8 km), NY 33 curves south under Genesee Street before joining it at a traffic light in front of the Buffalo Niagara International Airport.

=== Buffalo Airport to Batavia ===
Now returning to its pre-Kensington route, NY 33 follows a six-lane, divided Genesee Street past the airport on one side and numerous associated businesses such as hotels and fast food restaurants on the other. The large aerospace contractor Calspan has its headquarters here, and Westinghouse once operated a large industrial lathe plant on the airport side of the road (it was torn down when the airport was rebuilt in the late 1990s). Beyond the airport, the divider ends, the travel lanes are reduced to four and, after a short curve and minimal descent, NY 33 intersects Transit Road (NY 78) and enters the town of Lancaster. After this junction, the highway becomes a two-lane route once again through the small hamlet of Bowmansville, where it crosses Ellicott Creek near some rapids.

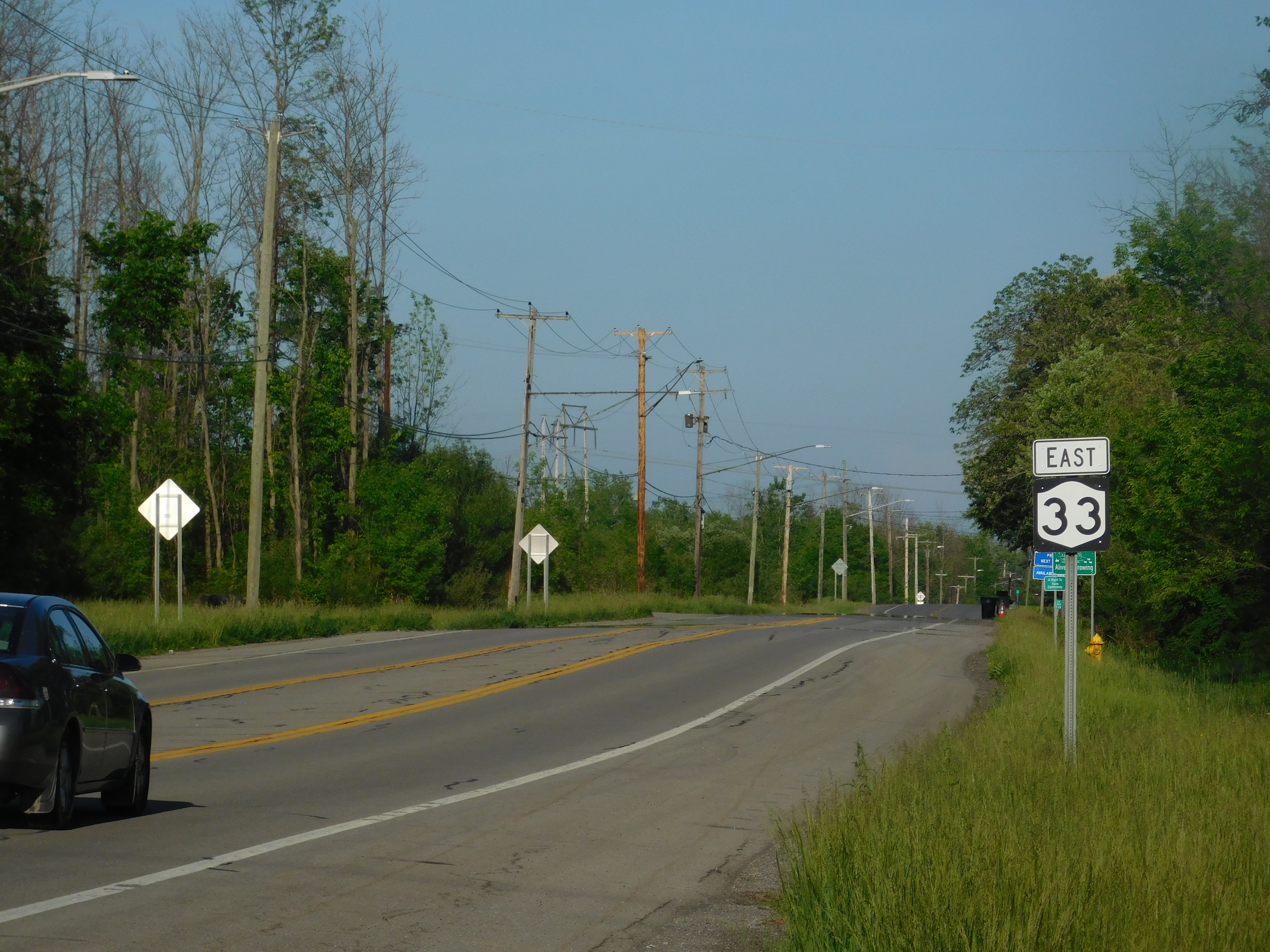
NY 33 at the Lancaster–Alden town line

For the next several miles, NY 33 runs parallel to the Thruway and very close to it, with both roads visible from the other. Much of this section of Lancaster has remained rural in character; however, that began to change in the mid-1990s when Tops Friendly Markets, the regional supermarket chain headquartered in nearby Williamsville, chose a site near the Gunnville Road intersection for a major distribution center. It necessitated the widening of the highway and construction of a traffic light and turn lanes at its entrance.

NY 33 becomes a two-lane route once again as it heads out into Alden and eventually joins another state-maintained street radiating out from the city, Walden Avenue, unsigned NY 952Q. NY 33 and the Genesee Street name take over Walden's straight, slightly north-trending course as it leaves Erie County for Genesee County. In the latter, it intersects with NY 77 in the center of the first community it encounters, the small village of Corfu. At the Batavia town line, it becomes Pearl Street, a name it keeps until it reaches NY 98 within the city of Batavia.

=== Batavia to Bergen ===
In the knot of highways that is the Genesee County seat, NY 33 crosses and briefly overlaps with not only NY 5, the other east–west route in town, but both north–south routes, NY 63 and NY 98. While concurrent with NY 98 on Oak Street Extension, NY 33 passes over Tonawanda Creek, which travels through Batavia on a roughly northwest–southeast alignment. The brief overlap with NY 98 ends at Main Street, which carries NY 5 and NY 63 through the western portion of the city. NY 33 turns east here, overlapping with NY 5 and NY 63 for five blocks along the four-lane, mostly commercial Main Street. NY 63 leaves in downtown Batavia at Ellicott Street; however, NY 5 and NY 33 continue to follow Main Street through much of the city's eastern half.

At the eastern fringe of Batavia, NY 33 splits in a northeast direction from NY 5, becoming Clinton Street, and, once outside the city limits, Clinton Street Road. In the town of Batavia, the highway passes through a residential area on its way to a junction with Batavia–Stafford Town Line Road, a county road providing access to Genesee Community College, located about 1 mile (1.6 km) to the north of NY 33. The route continues on a northeastward course into the town of Stafford, where it crosses over the CSX Transportation-owned Rochester Subdivision railroad line and the Thruway by way of overpasses less than 1 mile (1.6 km) apart. Unlike in Buffalo, there is no connection between NY 33 and the Thruway at this point.

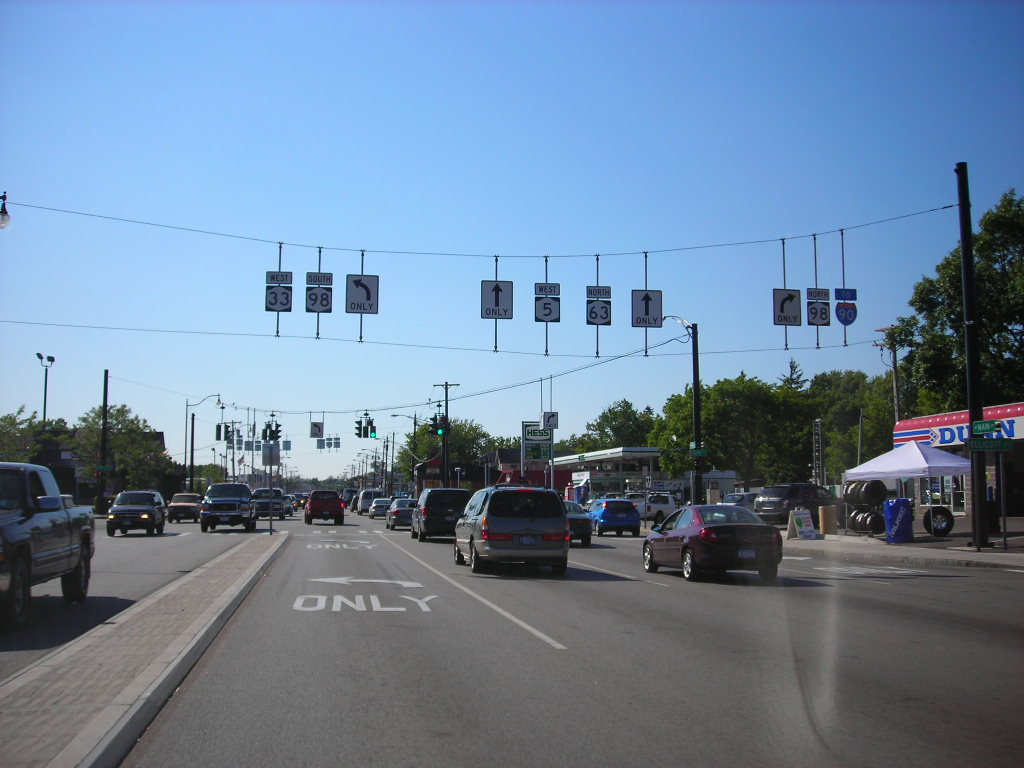
Main Street westbound at NY 98 in Batavia

It remains close to the Interstate Highway for about 4 miles (6 km), intersecting NY 237 less than a mile (1.6 km) north of the overpass taking that highway over the Thruway, but leaves it behind for good shortly thereafter as it turns even more to the north, taking it into the town of Bergen and the small village of the same name in the county's northeast corner. Here, NY 33 crosses NY 19, a long north–south route. Shortly afterward, NY 33A begins to the east while the main route turns to the north yet again and becomes Buffalo Road. Just east of this point, NY 33A connects to I-490, which briefly runs along the Monroe County line through this area. From the west end of NY 33A to the county line, NY 33 and I-490 follow virtually identical northeasterly alignments.

=== Monroe County ===
Once across the county line, NY 33 crosses over the Rochester Subdivision rail line for a second time before returning to a more easterly orientation. It parallels the CSX main line and I-490—both located a short distance to the south of NY 33—into the village of Churchville, where the route has a brief concurrency with NY 36. Farther east, NY 33 intersects NY 259 at North Chili and picks up another short concurrency with NY 386 as the suburbs begin at Gates. Here, NY 33 finally has a direct exit with I-490. Also directly accessible from this junction is NY 531, which begins about 0.75 miles (1.21 km) to the north. At this point, I-490 trades positions with NY 33 as it continues to parallel the latter, but now to the north instead.

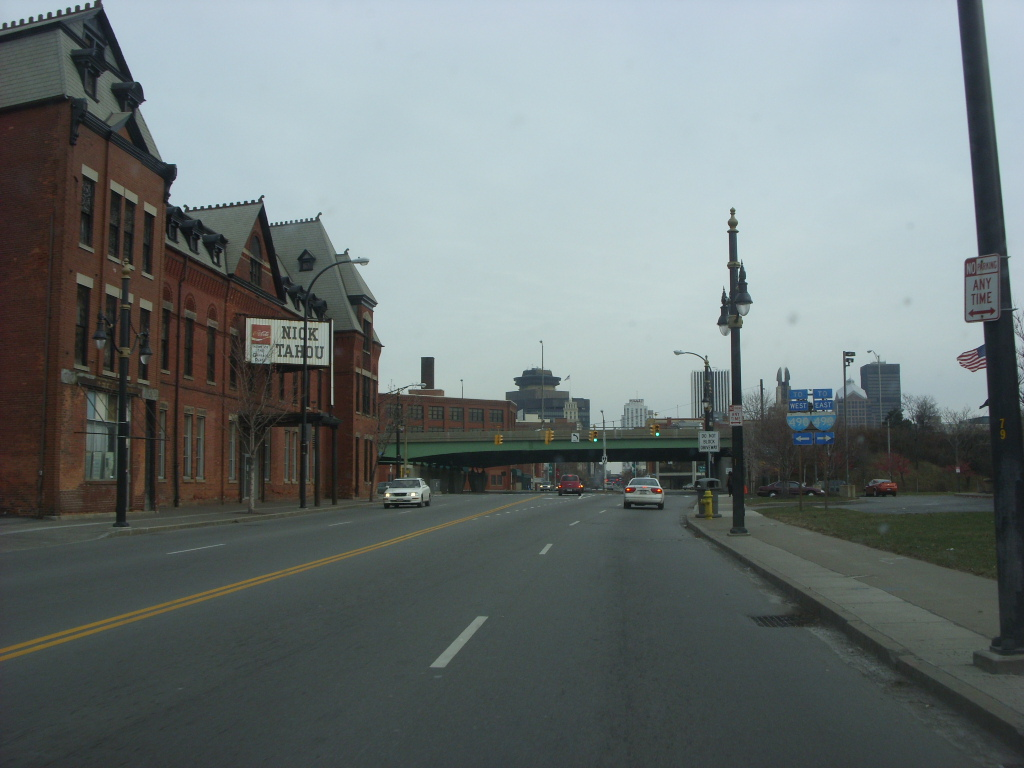
Passing Nick Tahou Hots as NY 33 approaches its eastern terminus at NY 31 in Rochester

The route continues another 1.5 miles (2.4 km) to Gates Center, meeting Howard Road (formerly part of NY 47 and still state-maintained as unsigned NY 940L) and crossing over, but not connecting to I-390. A crossing of the Erie Canal soon follows, bringing the route into the city of Rochester. Across the city line, NY 33 runs along the Rochester Subdivision rail line for about 1 mile (1.6 km), serving an industrial area built up along the north side of the railroad. It connects to Mount Read Boulevard by way of a roundabout before abruptly turning southward to pass under the tracks and meet up with West Avenue.

At West Avenue, NY 33 turns east into the densely populated western portion of the city, taking on the West Avenue name for 0.75 miles (1.21 km) to a junction with Chili Avenue, which carries NY 33A into the city. Here, NY 33A completes its southern loop and NY 33 picks up its final designation as West Main Street. NY 33 travels east-northeast along Main Street to the junction of West Main and West Broad Streets adjacent to where I-490 passes over the former. NY 33 ends here, giving way to NY 31, which enters from the north on Broad Street and continues to the east on Main Street. Nick Tahou Hots, a local restaurant, is located on the northwest corner of the junction.

== History ==
=== Designation ===
NY 33 was assigned in the mid-1920s to the portion of its modern alignment east of NY 5 in Batavia. West of Batavia, what is now NY 33 was unnumbered and only partially state-maintained. At the time, state maintenance of this segment began at the Buffalo city line and ended at current NY 77 in Corfu. The Corfu–Batavia segment was taken over by the state of New York in the late 1920s, and NY 33 was extended west over the now entirely state-maintained Genesee Street to Main Street (NY 5) in downtown Buffalo as part of the 1930 renumbering of state highways in New York.

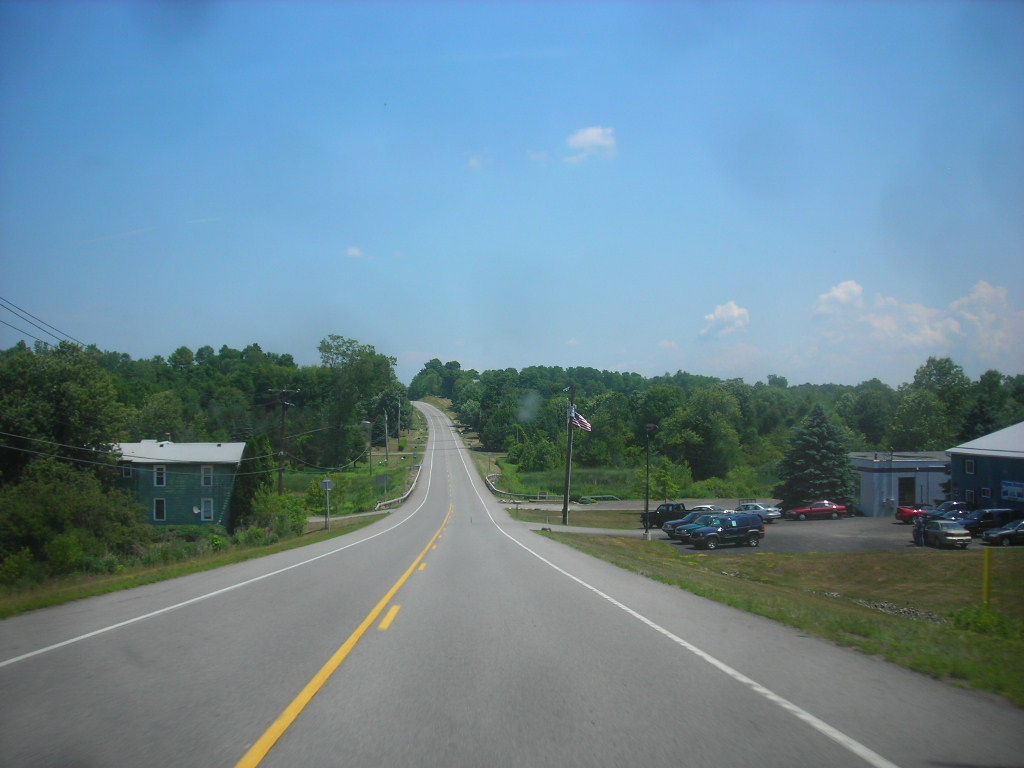
Eastbound on Walworth–Marion Road (former NY 33) near Walworth

At the same time, the route was extended east through Rochester to the Wayne County town of Marion 20 miles (32 km) to the east. It was routed along West Main Street and East Avenue from NY 31 in Rochester to Penfield Road in Brighton, overlapping NY 15 (now NY 96) from downtown Rochester to Brighton. NY 33 broke from NY 15 at Penfield Road and continued generally eastward on Penfield, Walworth–Penfield, and Walworth–Marion Roads through Brighton, Penfield and Walworth to Marion, where it ended at an intersection with NY 21. The route was cut back to its current eastern terminus at the end of a brief over lap of NY 31 in downtown Rochester on January 1, 1949, at which time the portion of NY 33's former routing east of NY 96 in Brighton was redesignated as NY 441.

=== Buffalo area ===
Construction began c. 1961 on the Kensington Expressway, a freeway connecting downtown Buffalo to the Buffalo Niagara International Airport. The first section of the expressway was completed between 1962 and 1964 and extended from Michigan Avenue (Harriet Tubman Way) to Best Street. The remainder of the highway was completed c. 1965, at which time NY 33 was realigned to follow the new expressway from Michigan Avenue to the airport. Its former routing on Genesee Street became NY 33B. There were once plans to extend the Kensington Expressway west to I-190 at exit 8; however, this extension was never built.

The western end of NY 33 has been located in downtown Buffalo since 1930; however, the exact location of its terminus has varied over time. In the mid-1970s, the northbound and southbound directions of NY 5 were split and rerouted to follow a series of streets through downtown Buffalo. Northbound NY 5 left the southbound direction at the north end of the Skyway and followed Church, South Division, Ellicott, and Chippewa Streets around downtown to Main Street, where both directions converged and continued north on Main Street. As a result, NY 33 was truncated eastward to the junction of Genesee and Ellicott Streets. At some point between 1979 and 1985, a pair of ramps were constructed between the west end of the Kensington Expressway and Oak and Elm Streets, a pre-existing one-way couplet one block to the west of Michigan Avenue. NY 33 initially followed the new ramps to Genesee Street; however, the route was altered in the latter half of the 1980s to connect to Ellicott Street (by this point part of NY 5 north) by way of Goodell and East Tupper Streets, another pre-existing one-way couplet.

In January 2022, Governor of New York Kathy Hochul announced that $1 billion was set aside for the construction of a 0.75-mile (1.21 km) long cover over the Kensington Expressway, reconnecting parts of Humboldt Parkway disconnected by the highway. This new cover would stretch from Dodge Street to Sidney Street in Buffalo. With construction of the cover, Humboldt Parkway would be rebuilt with 11 acres (4.5 ha) of trees and grass. It would also include 9 miles (14 km) of streets near Humboldt parkway being upgraded with new signage, sidewalks and curbs. Despite local opposition, Hochul announced on February 16, 2024 that the United States Government agreed to the project. The project is slated to begin at the end of 2024 with a projected completion date of 2028. Update: As of October 31, 2024, a New York Supreme Court decision has placed an extended Temporary Restraining Order on the NY 33 Kensington Expressway Project, after East Side Parkways Coalition, and over 60 Humboldt Parkway Neighborhood plaintiffs, and several other petitioners, including Citizens For Regional Transit, WNY Youth Climate Council, and the New York Civil Liberties Union, filed for an Injunction. The goal of the court action, is to require New York State Department of Transportation, the co-lead agency of the project, to furnish an Environmental Impact Statement or EIS, fully exploring alternate approaches to the expressway project, and addressing widespread complaints that NY Route 33 Kensington Expressway is responsible for inflicting pervasive air and noise pollution that has adversely impacted the health of countless Kensington Expressway Corridor neighborhood residents. A decision is expected to be rendered on Monday, November 18, 2024.

== Suffixed routes ==
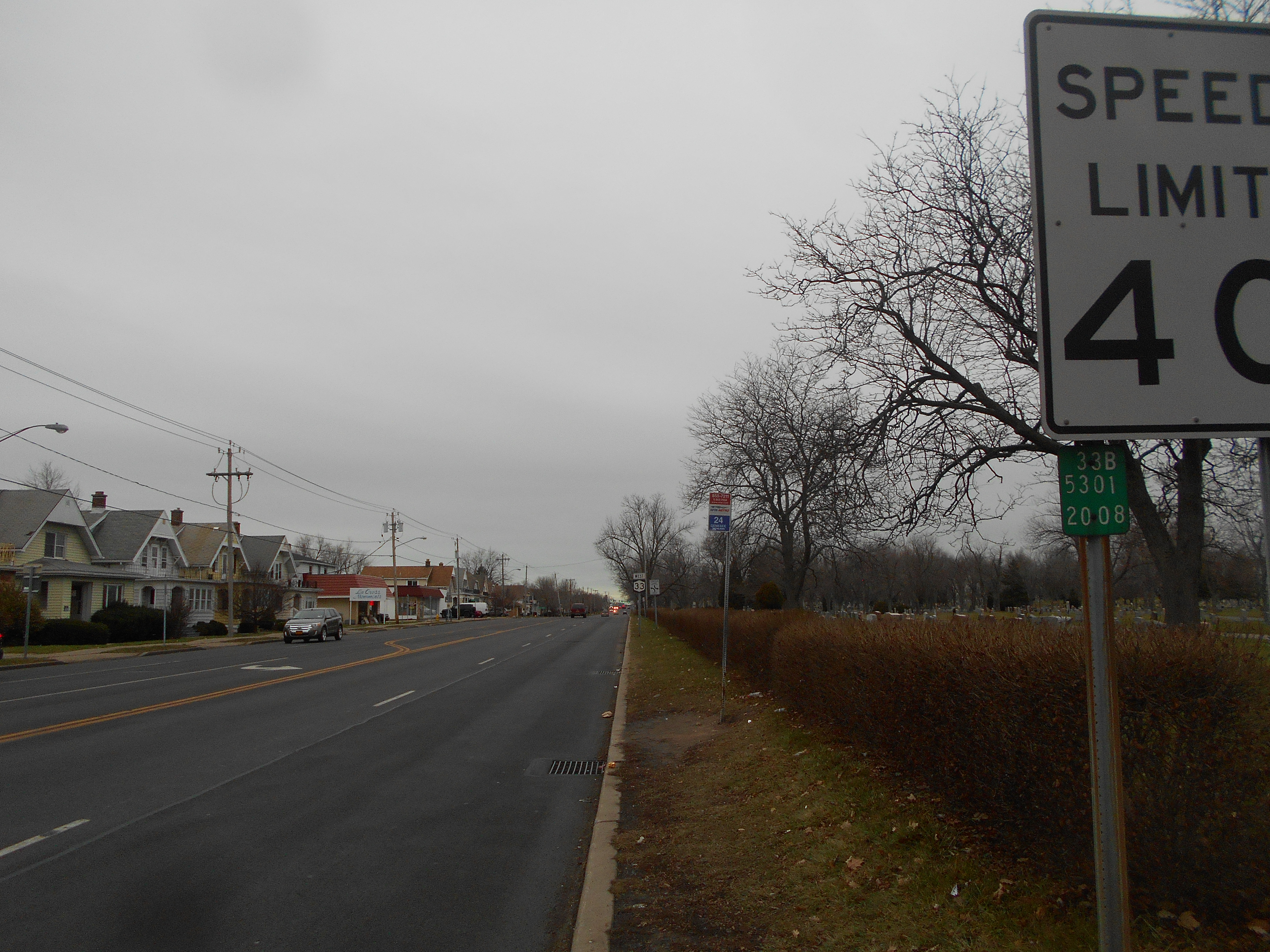
NY 33B reference marker on Genesee Street in Cheektowaga, erroneously signed as NY 33 in the distance

NY 33 has one current alternate route and one former spur designation that has been reused multiple times.

- NY 33A (17.15 miles or 27.60 kilometres) is an alternate route in the Rochester area that was assigned as part of the 1930 renumbering of state highways in New York.
- NY 33B is a designation that has been used for three different routes since the 1930s.
  - The original NY 33B was an alternate route of NY 33 through eastern Monroe and western Wayne counties. It was assigned c. 1931 and mostly renumbered to NY 31F when NY 33 was truncated to Rochester in 1949.
  - The second NY 33B was assigned to Brooks Avenue and Genesee Park Boulevard between NY 33A and NY 383 in Gates and Rochester. It was assigned c. 1962 and removed c. 1965. The Gates portion of its former routing is now part of NY 204.
  - The third alignment was a spur in the Buffalo area that followed NY 33's pre-Kensington Expressway routing on Genesee Street. It was assigned c. 1965 and removed on July 1, 1974. The section of former NY 33B between current NY 33 and the Buffalo city line is now NY 952A, an unsigned reference route.

== Major intersections ==
County	Location	mi	km	Destinations	Notes
Erie	Buffalo	0.00	0.00	NY 5 east (Ellicott Street)	Western terminus; at-grade intersection
Erie	Buffalo	0.20	0.32	Elm Street / Oak Street	Westbound exit and eastbound entrance
Erie	Buffalo	0.61	0.98	Locust Street – Buffalo Niagara Medical Campus	Westbound exit and eastbound entrance
Erie	Buffalo	0.87	1.40	Jefferson Avenue	Westbound exit and eastbound entrance
Erie	Buffalo	1.50	2.41	Best Street – Science Museum	
Erie	Buffalo	2.52	4.06	Humboldt Parkway	
Erie	Buffalo	2.81	4.52	NY 198 west (Scajaquada Expressway)	Eastern terminus of NY 198
Erie	Buffalo	3.72	5.99	Grider Street / Deerfield Avenue	
Erie	Buffalo	4.30	6.92	Olympic Avenue	Eastbound exit and westbound entrance
Erie	Buffalo	4.57	7.35	US 62 (Bailey Avenue)	Eastbound exit and westbound entrance
Erie	Buffalo	4.74	7.63	Suffolk Street	
Erie	Buffalo–Cheektowaga line	5.32	8.56	Eggert Road	
Erie	Cheektowaga	6.07	9.77	NY 240 (Harlem Road)	
Erie	Cheektowaga	6.97	11.22	I-90 / New York Thruway to I-290 west – Albany, Erie, Niagara Falls	Exits 51W-E on I-90 / Thruway
Erie	Cheektowaga	7.64	12.30	NY 277 (Union Road)	Eastbound exit and westbound entrance
Erie	Cheektowaga	8.18	13.16	Dick Road / Cayuga Road	Eastbound exit and westbound entrance
Erie	Cheektowaga	8.52	13.71	Eastern end of freeway section	
Erie	Cheektowaga	8.52	13.71	Genesee Street (NY 952A west) – Buffalo Niagara International Airport	Former NY 33B
Erie	Cheektowaga–Lancaster line	10.73	17.27	NY 78 (Transit Road) to I-90 / New York Thruway	
Erie	Town of Alden	19.52	31.41	Walden Avenue (NY 952Q west) – Lancaster	
Genesee	Corfu	25.88	41.65	NY 77	
Genesee	City of Batavia	37.05	59.63	NY 98 south (South Main Street)	Western terminus of NY 98 overlap
Genesee	City of Batavia	37.13	59.75	NY 5 west / NY 63 north / NY 98 north to I-90 / New York Thruway	Western terminus of NY 5/NY 63 overlap; eastern terminus of NY 98 overlap
Genesee	City of Batavia	37.40	60.19	NY 63 south (Ellicott Street)	Eastern terminus of NY 63 overlap
Genesee	City of Batavia	38.60	62.12	NY 5 east (East Main Street)	Eastern terminus of NY 5 overlap
Genesee	Town of Stafford	44.14	71.04	NY 237 – Stafford, Holley	
Genesee	Village of Bergen	50.97	82.03	NY 19 – Bergen, Brockport	
Genesee	Village of Bergen	51.34	82.62	NY 33A east to I-90 / New York Thruway / I-490 – Rochester	Western terminus of NY 33A
Monroe	Churchville	55.00	88.51	NY 36 south to I-490	Western terminus of NY 36 overlap
Monroe	Churchville	55.83	89.85	NY 36 north	Eastern terminus of NY 36 overlap
Monroe	Town of Chili	59.20	95.27	NY 259	Hamlet of North Chili
Monroe	Town of Gates	63.14	101.61	NY 386 south	Western terminus of NY 386 overlap
Monroe	Town of Gates	63.34	101.94	NY 386 north	Eastern terminus of NY 386 overlap
Monroe	Town of Gates	64.09	103.14	I-490 / NY 531 west – Spencerport	Eastern terminus of NY 531; exits 7A-B on I-490
Monroe	Town of Gates	65.51	105.43	Howard Road (NY 940L)	Hamlet of Gates Center
Monroe	Rochester	67.13	108.04	Mount Read Boulevard (NY 940K north)	
Monroe	Rochester	68.34	109.98	NY 33A west	Eastern terminus of NY 33A
Monroe	Rochester	69.26	111.46	NY 31	Eastern terminus
1.000 mi = 1.609 km; 1.000 km = 0.621 mi: Concurrency terminus; Incomplete access
