= Adams-Ryan House =

- U.S. National Register of Historic Places
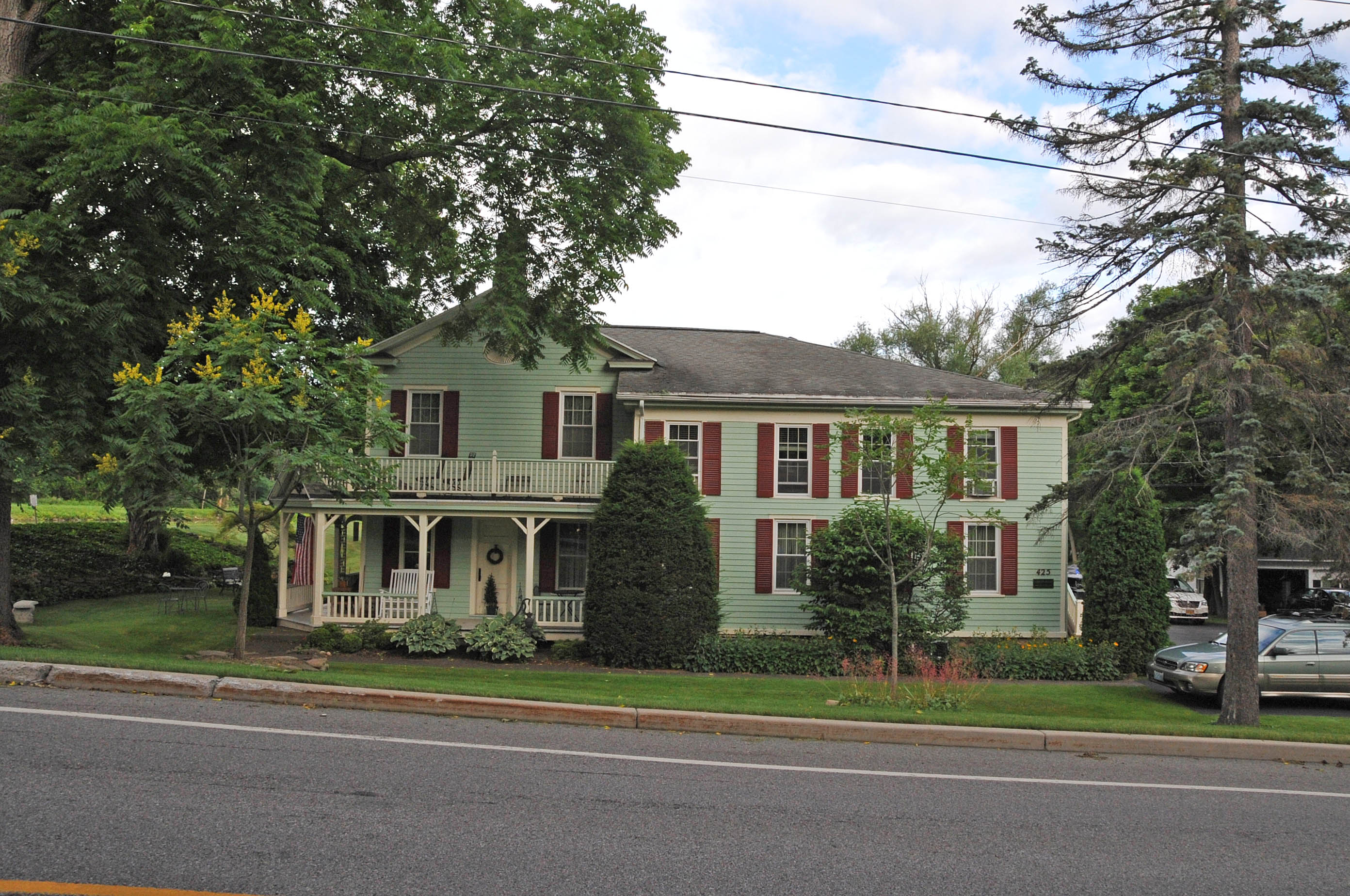

- Location within New York Location within the United States
- Location: 425 Washington St., Adams Basin, New York
- Coordinates: 43°11′46″N 77°51′17″W
- Area: 0.5 acres (0.20 ha)
- Built: 1825
- Architectural style: Federal, Vernacular Federal
- NRHP reference No.: 85001957
- Added to NRHP: September 5, 1985

Adams-Ryan House is a historic home located at Adams Basin in the town of Ogden in Monroe County, New York. It was constructed about 1825 and is a rare surviving example of an inn that operated along the towpath of the Erie Canal. The original structure reflects a vernacular Federal style. Later alterations added vernacular Greek Revival style details. Throughout the 19th century there were several additions to the original structure and in 1912 it underwent further alterations and remodeling. It ceased operating as an inn in 1916 and was virtually abandoned between 1939 and 1972. Also on the property are a contributing barn and privy. It operated as a bed and breakfast until it was sold as a private residence in 2018.

It was listed on the National Register of Historic Places on September 5, 1985.
