= New York State Route 531 =

Highway in Monroe County, New York

New York State Route 531
- Spencerport Expressway
- Map of the Rochester area with NY 531 highlighted in red and service roads in blue

Route information
- Maintained by NYSDOT
- Length: 8.02 mi (12.91 km)
- Existed: 1984–present

Major junctions
- West end: NY 31 / NY 36 in Ogden
- East end: I-490 / NY 33 in Gates

Location
- Country: United States
- State: New York
- Counties: Monroe

Highway system
- New York Highways; Interstate; US; State; Reference; Parkways
← I-495	→ I-587

New York State Route 531 (NY 531) is an east–west freeway located in Monroe County, New York, United States. The route extends for 8.02 miles (12.91 km) from the far northwestern suburbs of Rochester to the town of Gates located just west of the city. The western terminus of the route is at an intersection with NY 31 and NY 36 west of the village of Spencerport in the town of Ogden, while the eastern terminus of NY 531 is at Interstate 490 (I-490) exit 8 2 miles (3.2 km) west of the Rochester city limits. NY 531 is the primary route between Rochester and the village of Brockport, located 5 miles (8 km) northwest of NY 531's west end.

The expressway was constructed in three sections, the first of which opened in the 1960s as New York State Route 940P, an unsigned reference route, and extended from I-490 to Elmgrove Road. An extension of NY 940P to Manitou Road was completed in 1984, at which time the expressway was redesignated as NY 531. The final section between NY 36 and Manitou Road opened to traffic in 1995. NY 531 is officially designated the Senator Ralph Quattrociocchi Memorial Highway in honor of Ralph E. Quattrociocchi, a New York State Senator who played a large role in making the second extension of NY 531 possible. The road is also known as the Spencerport Expressway, named for the village near the highway's western terminus.

In the mid-2000s, a number of grants were given by various agencies to the New York State Department of Transportation (NYSDOT) to finance research and planning for a potential extension of NY 531 westward to Redman Road in Brockport. A 2007 meeting between residents of Brockport and officials from NYSDOT revealed three options that were under consideration: an extension of NY 531 to Redman Road, the widening of NY 31 through the towns of Ogden and Sweden, and keeping the status quo. Ultimately, the first two options were ruled out in 2009, at which time NYSDOT announced only small-scale projects to alleviate areas of traffic congestion will be considered.

The NYSDOT began a multi-year project in 2017 to upgrade the western terminus of NY 531 at NY 36 and to expand and improve a three-mile corridor of NY 31 from Adams Basin west to the Sweden town line. The work is intended to improve capacity and safety of the busy main corridor from Brockport to the city of Rochester.

== Route description ==
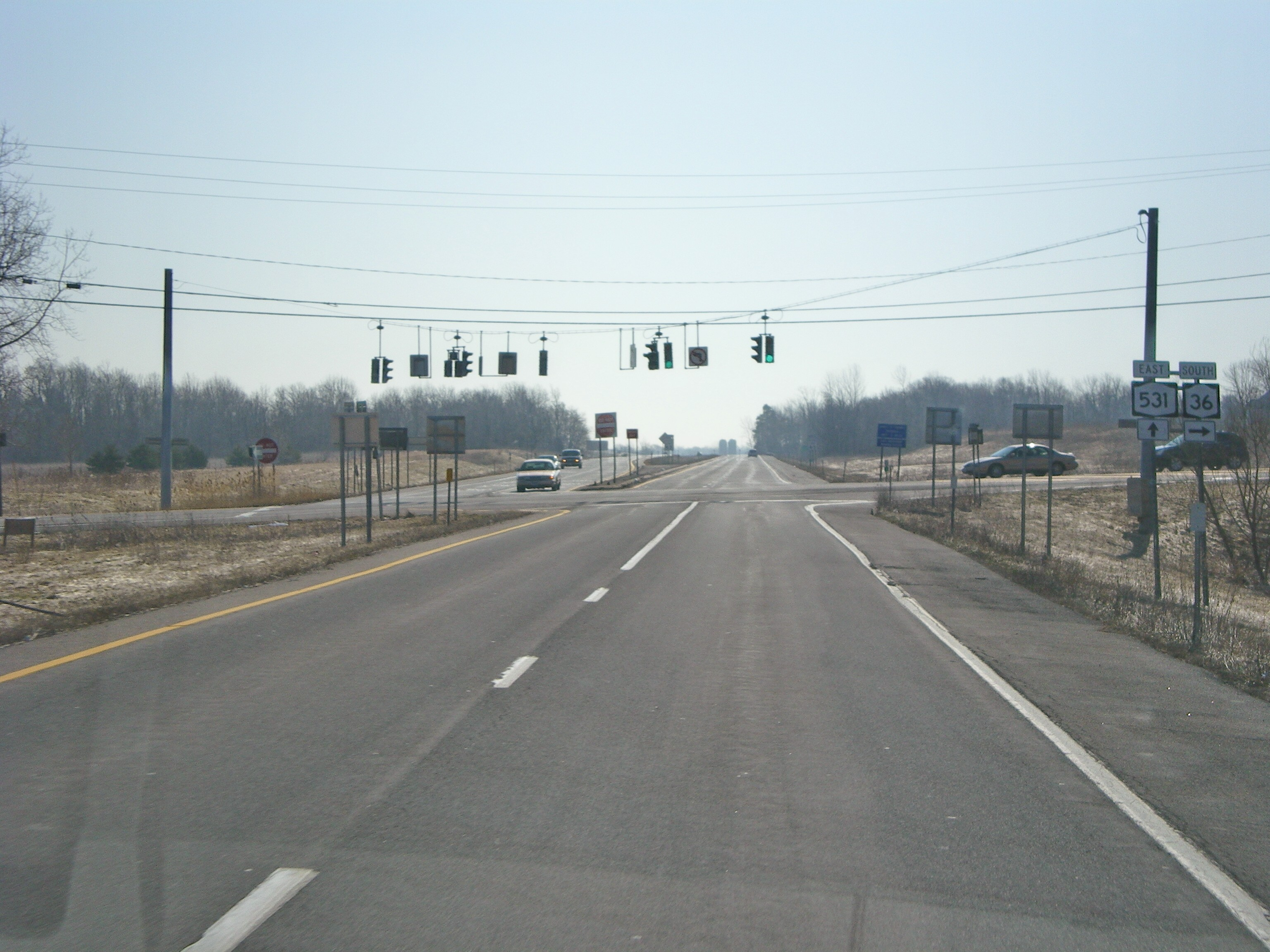
NY 531's western terminus at NY 36 prior to completion of its reconstruction in 2018

NY 531 begins at NY 31 a half-mile (0.8 km) west of the northern terminus of NY 36. NY 31 and NY 531 then turn southwest and widens to four lanes shortly before intersecting with Washington Street (NY 36) at an at-grade intersection. At NY 36 intersection, NY 31 briefly follows the right of way of NY 36, before continuing west on Brockport-Spencerport Road. Past the junction with NY 36, NY 531 becomes a four-lane limited-access highway, passing through open fields as it heads east through rural Ogden.

Directly south of Spencerport, NY 531 encounters South Union Street (NY 259) by way of a diamond interchange bordered on both sides by small housing tracts. The roadway continues eastward, reentering open and mostly undeveloped areas of the town. It heads past farmland for 2 miles (3.2 km) before turning southward a short distance east of an overpass carrying Gillett Road. NY 531 proceeds due south for 0.75 miles (1.21 km), passing over Lyell Road at the midpoint of the segment, before returning to an east–west alignment just ahead of the Manitou Road exit, where NY 531 crosses into the town of Gates.

Between Manitou Road and Elmgrove Road (NY 386), NY 531 is flanked on both sides by frontage roads 1.08-mile (1.74 km) in length. NY 531 eastbound connects to Manitou Road, NY 386, and the Rochester Tech Park solely by way of the south frontage road, designated NY 946E, while the north frontage road, designated NY 946F, acts as a collection road for the separate ramps to NY 386 and Manitou Road from NY 531 westbound. Both frontage road designations are unsigned reference routes; in fact, reference markers along the two roads display "531" for the route number instead of their respective designations. The westbound exit to the Rochester Tech Park, a standalone two-lane ramp that splits from NY 531 a short distance west of the NY 386 overpass, has no connection to the north frontage road.

West of NY 386, the expressway expands to three lanes eastbound as it leaves the heavily commercialized and industrialized area around Elmgrove and Manitou Roads and enters a narrow, wooded area bordered by homes to the north. Not far to the east, NY 531 comes to an end at a slightly modified directional T interchange with I-490. Heading eastbound, the two leftmost lanes connect NY 531 to I-490 eastbound while the right lane links to I-490 westbound 0.25 miles (0.40 km) north of I-490's modified cloverleaf interchange with NY 33.

== History ==
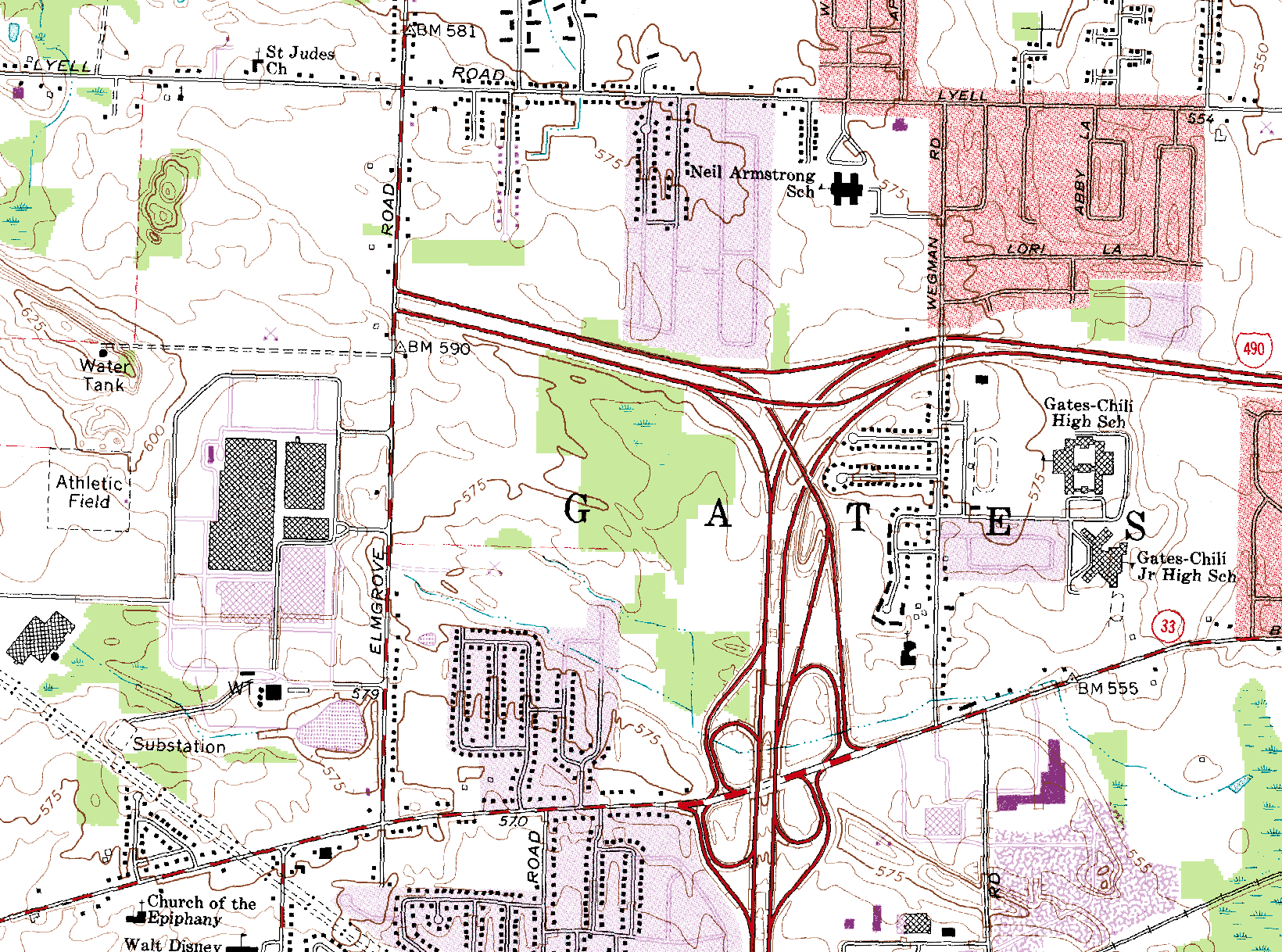
1978 United States Geological Survey topographic map of Gates, showing the entirety of then-NY 940P from Elmgrove Road to I-490

The Spencerport Expressway was conceived as part of a plan to link Rochester and Buffalo with a limited-access, toll-free highway. Although this plan was ultimately scrapped, the first segment of the expressway from I-490 west to Elmgrove Road in Gates was built in the early 1960s and completed by 1964. When it opened, it was designated as NY 940P, an unsigned reference route designation. In 1984, the expressway was extended westward to Manitou Road and was redesignated as the signed NY 531.

In April 1987, plans to extend the expressway further westward to NY 36 in Ogden were set in motion. At that time, New York State Senator Ralph E. Quattrociocchi and State Assemblyman Steve Hawley introduced legislation requesting $15 million (equivalent to $41.5 million in 2024) for the extension of NY 531 west to Washington Street (NY 36). The money would be appropriated to NYSDOT. More money was devoted to the project as part of a $3 billion (equivalent to $7.98 billion in 2024) bond issue dubbed "Rebuild New York" that was presented to voters during the November 1988 elections. The measure was approved with 55% of the vote. The money assigned to NY 531 went toward 2.3 miles (3.7 km) of the route's extension.

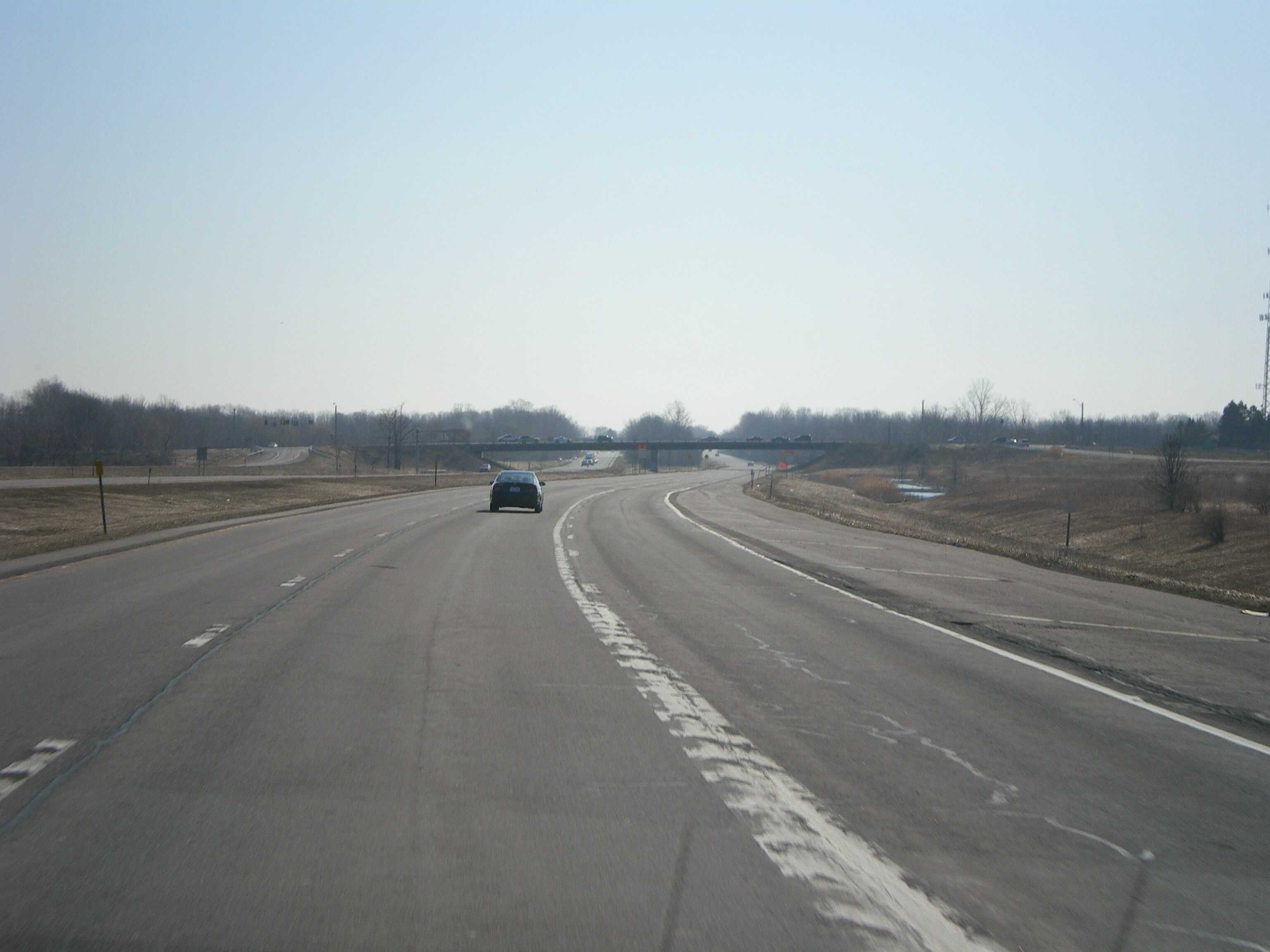
NY 531's interchange with NY 386. Until 1984, this interchange was the expressway's western terminus.

Despite the presence of funding, construction was delayed on the extension until 1993 due to opposition from residents of the communities surrounding NY 531's future routing—namely Gates, Spencerport and Ogden. The new segment of NY 531 opened to traffic in 1995. The entirety of NY 531 is dedicated the "Senator Ralph Quattrociocchi Memorial Highway" by NYSDOT in honor of Quattrociocchi and his role in making the second extension possible. The highway ended at NY 36.

=== Proposed extension and improvements ===
In July 2004, the Genesee Transportation Council added $5.8 million to its Transportation Improvement Program aimed at stimulating the effort to extend NY 531 westward toward Brockport. The money went to NYSDOT for engineering and environmental studies, which began that year. Later, in September 2005, another $5.92 million was secured by Monroe County through efforts coordinated by then-United States Representative Tom Reynolds. The amount was put toward the completion of the planning phase of the project.

On January 10, 2007, NYSDOT held a meeting in Brockport to discuss the future of NY 531. Three options were considered at the event. The first option advocated status quo, keeping the western terminus of NY 531 at NY 36. The second, most expensive option, would result in the extension of NY 531 along a new right-of-way to Redman Road, 1 mile (1.6 km) west of NY 19, southwest of Brockport at a cost of $94 million. The third option would be to upgrade NY 31 between NY 36 and Redman Road at an expense of $41 million. The second option, if chosen, would have been difficult to implement due to its cost. As the annual budget of all of NYSDOT Region 4 equates to $90 million, the project would have to be constructed as financing became available. Two more meetings were planned in 2008 and 2009, and a request for approval of the completed design was scheduled for late 2009.

On March 26, 2009, NYSDOT announced that they were no longer considering extending NY 531 to Redman Road. The state cited the project's price tag, which had risen to $125 million, and the existing road infrastructure in the area, which the state deemed satisfactory and as not in need of an extension of NY 531. Also ruled out by the DOT was the widening of NY 31 through Ogden and Sweden. Instead, NYSDOT shifted its focus to alleviating traffic issues at the junction of NY 531 and NY 36. Improvements considered by NYSDOT include constructing bridges for NY 531 over NY 31 and/or NY 36, converting the at-grade intersection between NY 36 and NY 531 into a diamond interchange, or some combination of those and other, unnamed options. These smaller-scale projects, termed "spot improvements" by the DOT, range in cost from $12 million to $20 million.

On June 8, 2017, Governor of New York Andrew Cuomo announced the NYSDOT would upgrade the intersection of NY 531, NY 31 and NY 36. The terminus of NY 531 was reconstructed to add a direct connection to NY 31, with improvements to the interchange of NY 36 and NY 531. NY 531 now feeds directly into NY 31, turning into a two lane roadway 400 feet west of Washington Street (NY 36). A 1.5 mile section NY 31 west of 531 saw the addition of a central turning lane, and a center median from Gallup Road west to 531. These improvements are designed to improve capacity and safety standards on the heavily utilized NY 31/NY 531 corridor from NY 260 to Adams Basin. The new traffic configuration was opened to traffic in August 2018.

== Exit list ==
The entire route is in Monroe County. All exits are unnumbered.

Location	mi	km	Destinations	Notes
Ogden	0.00	0.00	NY 31 / NY 36 south – Adams Basin	Western terminus; northern terminus of NY 36; at-grade intersection
Ogden	2.61	4.20	NY 259 (Union Street) – Spencerport	
Ogden–Gates town line	5.89	9.48	Manitou Road	
Gates	6.37	10.25	Rochester Tech Park	
Gates	6.99	11.25	NY 386 (Elmgrove Road)	Westbound exit and eastbound entrance
Gates	8.02	12.91	I-490 / NY 33 – Rochester, Buffalo	Eastern terminus; exits 7B-8 on I-490
1.000 mi = 1.609 km; 1.000 km = 0.621 mi: Incomplete access

== See also ==
- Route 531 Terminus Improvement Project
