= Franklin Hinchey House =

Historic house in New York, United States

- U.S. National Register of Historic Places
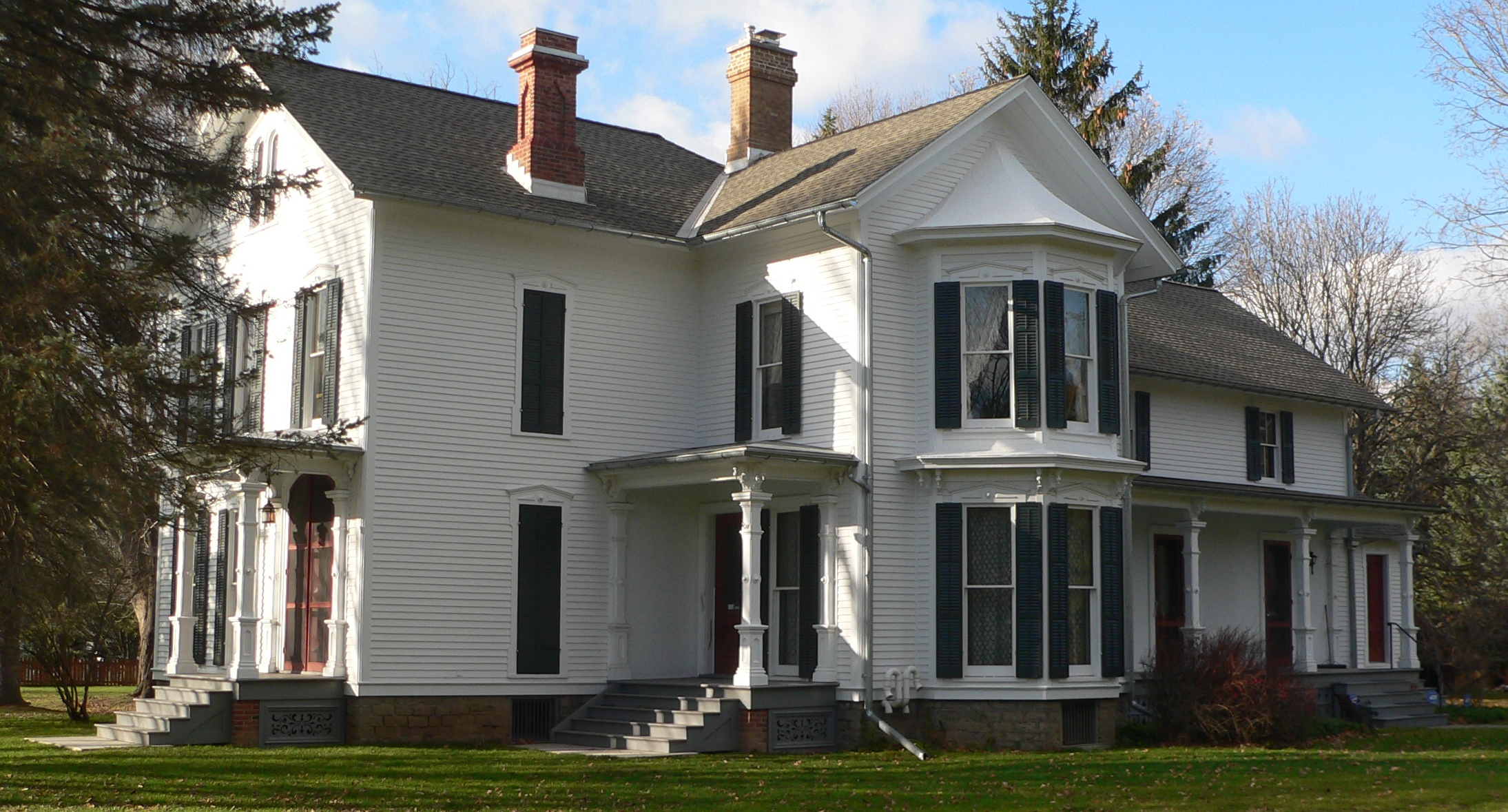
- Franklin Hinchey House, seen from the southeast

- Location within New York Location within the United States
- Location: 634 Hinchey Rd., Gates, New York
- Coordinates: 43°8′21″N 77°41′18″W
- Area: 3.1 acres (1.3 ha)
- Built: 1870
- Architect: Cummings, James; Fitzsimmons, Patrick
- Architectural style: Gothic Revival
- NRHP reference No.: 83004045
- Added to NRHP: November 10, 1983

Franklin Hinchey House is a historic home located at Gates in Monroe County, New York. It is a 2 1/2-story wood-frame cruciform structure constructed in 1870 in the Gothic Revival style with picturesque Italianate elements. The property includes three acres of farmland, cabbage barn, and incubator house.

It was listed on the National Register of Historic Places in 1983.
