= North Gates, New York =

- Census-designated place
- Location in Monroe County and the state of New York

- Location of New York in the United States
- Coordinates: 43°10′27″N 77°42′25″W
- Country: United States
- State: New York
- County: Monroe County
- Town: Gates

Area
  - Total: 2.69 sq mi (6.96 km^{2})
  - Land: 2.66 sq mi (6.89 km^{2})
  - Water: 0.027 sq mi (0.07 km^{2})
- Elevation: 545 ft (166 m)

Population (2020)
  - Total: 9,458
  - Density: 3,554.8/sq mi (1,372.52/km^{2})
- Time zone: UTC-5 (Eastern (EST))
  - Summer (DST): UTC-4 (EDT)
- ZIP Codes: 14606 (Gates); 14626 (Greece)
- Area code: 585
- FIPS code: 36-52040

North Gates is a census-designated place (CDP) in the town of Gates, Monroe County, New York, United States. The population was 9,458 at the 2020 census. The census area was part of Gates-North Gates CDP from 1980 thru 2000.

== Geography ==
North Gates is in the northeastern part of the town of Gates; it is bordered to the east by the city of Rochester, to the north by the town of Greece, and to the south by the Gates CDP. New York State Route 31 (Spencerport Road) passes through North Gates, leading east-southeast 5 miles (8 km) to downtown Rochester and west the same distance to Spencerport.

According to the U.S. Census Bureau, the North Gates CDP has a total area of 2.69 square miles (7.0 km^{2}), of which 0.03 square miles (0.08 km^{2}), or 0.97%, are water. The Erie Canal passes through the northeast corner of the community.

== Demographics ==
Historical population
Census	Pop.	Note	%±
2010	9,512		—
2020	9,458		−0.6%
U.S. Decennial Census

=== 2020 census ===
As of the 2020 census, North Gates had a population of 9,458. The median age was 44.4 years. 17.5% of residents were under the age of 18 and 21.0% of residents were 65 years of age or older. For every 100 females there were 93.0 males, and for every 100 females age 18 and over there were 90.3 males age 18 and over.

100.0% of residents lived in urban areas, while 0.0% lived in rural areas.

There were 4,448 households in North Gates, of which 21.8% had children under the age of 18 living in them. Of all households, 34.3% were married-couple households, 23.3% were households with a male householder and no spouse or partner present, and 34.8% were households with a female householder and no spouse or partner present. About 39.4% of all households were made up of individuals and 18.3% had someone living alone who was 65 years of age or older.

There were 4,621 housing units, of which 3.7% were vacant. The homeowner vacancy rate was 1.1% and the rental vacancy rate was 4.1%.

Racial composition as of the 2020 census
Race	Number	Percent
White	6,561	69.4%
Black or African American	1,297	13.7%
American Indian and Alaska Native	21	0.2%
Asian	498	5.3%
Native Hawaiian and Other Pacific Islander	4	0.0%
Some other race	305	3.2%
Two or more races	772	8.2%
Hispanic or Latino (of any race)	898	9.5%

=== 2010 census ===
As of the census of 2010, there were 9,512 people, 4,214 households, and 2,460 families residing in the CDP. The population density was 3,573.3 per square mile. There were 4,467 housing units at an average density of 1,654.4/sq mi. The racial makeup of the CDP was 80.8% White, 10.3% African American, 0.3% Native American, 4.4% Asian, 0.0% Pacific Islander and 2.6% from two or more races. Hispanic or Latino of any race were 6.6% of the population.
