= Adams Basin, New York =

Hamlet in the state of New York, United States

- Hamlet
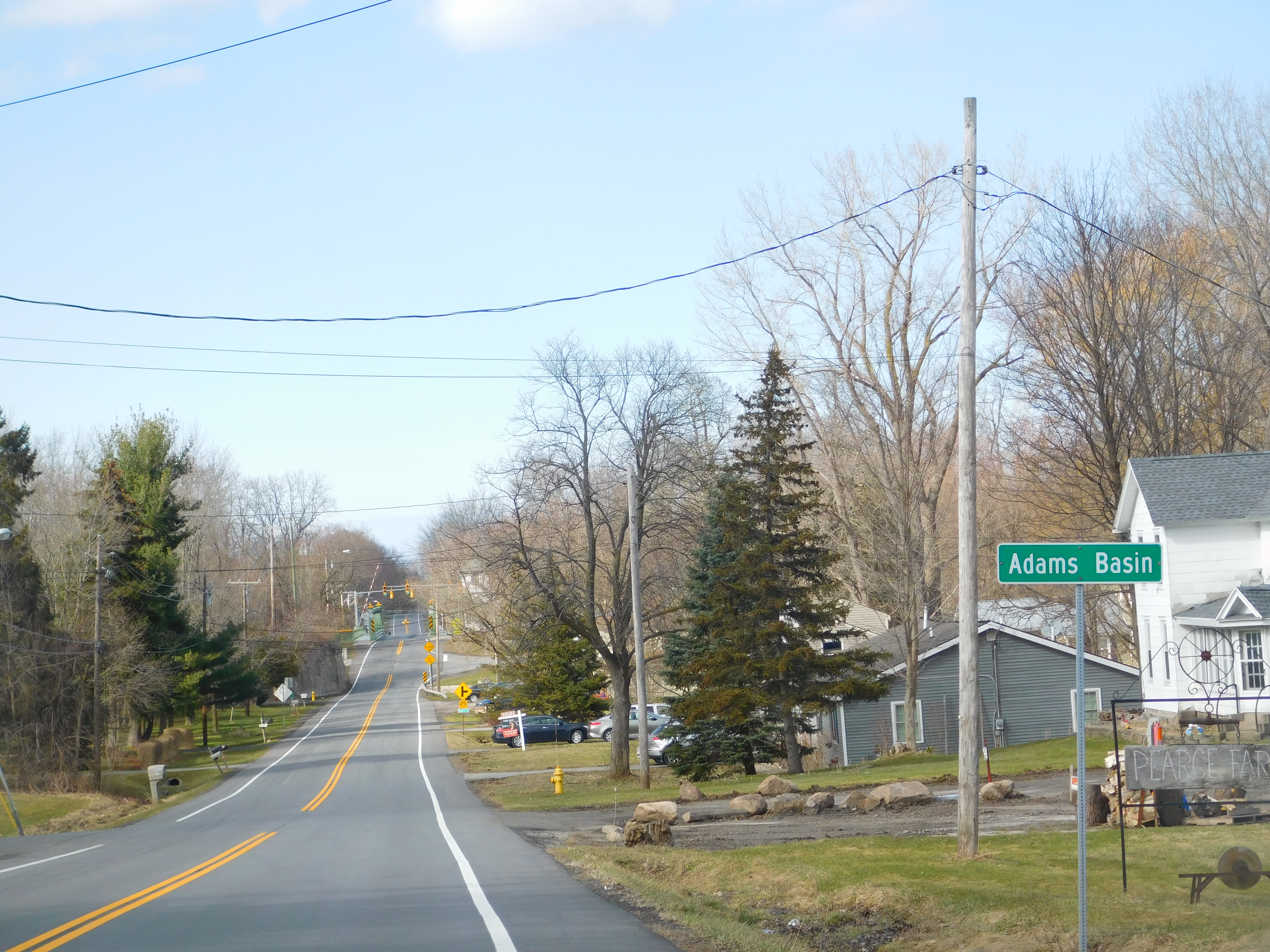
- The hamlet of Adams Basin along CR 212

- Location within New York Location within the United States
- Coordinates: 43°11′50.84″N 77°51′14.01″W
- Country: United States
- State: New York
- County: Monroe
- Town: Ogden
- Elevation: 502 ft (153 m)
- Time zone: UTC-5 (Eastern (EST))
  - Summer (DST): UTC-4 (EDT)
- ZIP Code: 14410
- Area code: 585
- GNIS feature ID: 942160

Adams Basin is a hamlet in Monroe County, New York, United States. The hamlet is the location of the Adams-Ryan House, a historic Erie Canal inn listed on the National Register of Historic Places in 1985 and was operated as a bed and breakfast.

Adams Basin is located in the northwestern corner of the town of Ogden. Though fully surrounded by the Spencerport zip code of 14559, the hamlet has its own post office with zip code 14410. Adams Basin is within the Brockport Central School District.
