= Gates, New York =

- Town
- Location in Monroe County and the state of New York

- Location of New York in the United States
- Coordinates: 43°08′59″N 77°41′49″W
- Country: United States
- State: New York
- County: Monroe
- Established: 1813

Government
  - Town Supervisor: Cosmo Giunta (R) Appointed November 7, 2018
  - Town Council: List: Stephen Tucciarello (R); Christopher B. DiPonzio (R); Lee Cordero (R); Andrew Loughlin (R)

Area
  - Total: 15.28 sq mi (39.58 km^{2})
  - Land: 15.20 sq mi (39.37 km^{2})
  - Water: 0.081 sq mi (0.21 km^{2})
- Elevation: 575 ft (175 m)

Population (2020)
  - Total: 29,167
  - Density: 1,919/sq mi (741/km^{2})
- Time zone: UTC-5 (EST)
  - Summer (DST): UTC-4 (EDT)
- ZIP Codes: 14624, 14606 (Gates); 14559 (Spencerport)
- Area code: 585
- FIPS code: 36-055-28442
- Website: www.townofgatesny.gov

Gates is a town in Monroe County, New York, United States. The town is named after General Horatio Gates. The population was 29,167 at the 2020 census. Gates and North Gates are census-designated places within the town. It is a suburb of Rochester.

== History ==
The town of Gates was organized in 1797 as "Northampton" in Ontario County. In 1808 the town was subdivided, and the part still called Northampton was renamed "Gates" and incorporated on April 1, 1813, in honor of General Horatio Gates. In 1821 Monroe County was formed, including the town of Gates. Parts of the town were later detached to form the city of Rochester and the town of Greece, both of which now border the town.

The Franklin Hinchey House was listed on the National Register of Historic Places in 1983.

== Geography ==
Gates is in central Monroe County. It is bordered to the east by Rochester, the county seat. Interstate 390, part of the Rochester Outer Loop, curves through the eastern side of the town. Interstate 490 intersects I-390 and passes through the center of the town, leading east into downtown Rochester and southwest 17 miles (27 km) to the New York State Thruway. The New York State Route 531 freeway branches off I-490 and leads northwest 5 miles (8 km) to Spencerport.

According to the U.S. Census Bureau, the town of Gates has a total area of 15.3 square miles (40 km^{2}), of which 15.2 square miles (39 km^{2}) are land and 0.08 square miles (0.21 km^{2}), or 0.54%, are water.

Within the Town of Gates is the geographic center, also called the centroid, of Monroe County. The exact spot within Gates of the centroid is latitude and longitude 43° 8′ 46.37″ N 77° 41′ 45.44″ W which is in a small wooded area 500 feet southwest of Gates Town Hall.

== Government ==
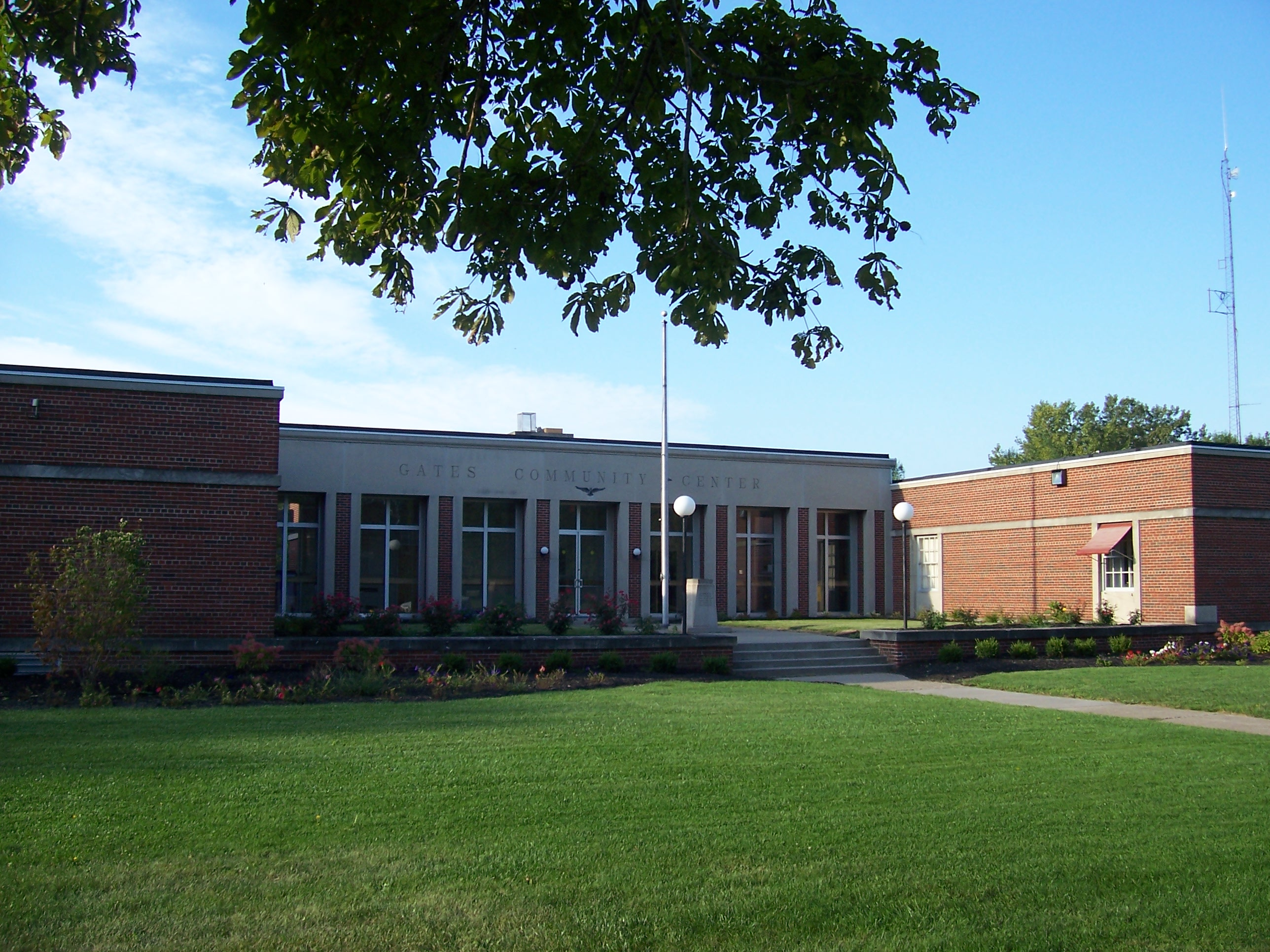
Gates community center, which houses the town offices

The legislative branch of the government of the town is a four-member town council whose members are elected every four years. As of 2025, the members of the town council are Chris B. Diponzio, Steve Tucciarello, Andrew Loughlin and Lee Cordero. The Executive branch of the town government is the Town Supervisor, who is elected every two years. The current town supervisor is Cosmo Giunta, who was appointed town supervisor on November 7, 2018.

== Economy ==
Wegmans Food Markets has its headquarters in the town. Rochester Tech Park, the former site of a Kodak manufacturing plant that is now home to companies such as Kodak Alaris, Pepsi Bottling Group, Citigroup, and Maximus Inc., is located within the town as well.

== Demographics ==
Historical population
Census	Pop.	Note	%±
1820	2,643		—
1830	7,772		194.1%
1840	1,728		−77.8%
1850	2,005		16.0%
1860	2,710		35.2%
1870	3,541		30.7%
1880	1,988		−43.9%
1890	2,910		46.4%
1900	3,468		19.2%
1910	4,862		40.2%
1920	1,419		−70.8%
1930	3,634		156.1%
1940	4,965		36.6%
1950	7,925		59.6%
1960	13,755		73.6%
1970	26,442		92.2%
1980	29,756		12.5%
1990	28,583		−3.9%
2000	29,275		2.4%
2010	28,400		−3.0%
2020	29,167		2.7%
U.S. Decennial Census

As of the census of 2000, there were 29,275 people, 11,730 households, and 8,046 families residing in the CDP. The population density was 1,921.8 inhabitants per square mile (742.0/km^{2}). There were 12,049 housing units at an average density of 791.0 per square mile (305.4/km^{2}). The racial makeup of the CDP was

- 88.62% White,
- 6.38% African American,
- 0.17% Native American,
- 2.36% Asian,
- 0.04% Pacific Islander,
- 1.09% from other races, and 1.35% from two or more races.
- Hispanic or Latino of any race were 2.92% of the population.

There were 11,730 households, out of which 28.6% had children under the age of 18 living with them, 53.8% were married couples living together, 10.7% had a female householder with no husband present, and 31.4% were non-families. 26.5% of all households were made up of individuals, and 12.1% had someone living alone who was 65 years of age or older. The average household size was 2.48 and the average family size was 3.01.

In the CDP the population was spread out, with 22.6% under the age of 18, 6.9% from 18 to 24, 28.9% from 25 to 44, 24.2% from 45 to 64, and 17.4% who were 65 years of age or older. The median age was 40 years. For every 100 females, there were 92.4 males. For every 100 females age 18 and over, there were 88.5 males.

The median income for a household in the CDP was $45,709, and the median income for a family was $53,964. Males had a median income of $38,815 versus $29,024 for females. The per capita income for the CDP was $21,353. About 4.3% of families and 5.6% of the population were below the poverty line, including 5.2% of those under age 18 and 6.8% of those age 65 or over.

== Education ==
Gates is served by the Gates Chili Central School District and the Spencerport Central School District.

== Notable person ==
- Henry G. Danforth, former US congressman

== Communities and locations in Gates ==
- Elmgrove - a hamlet on Routes 386 and 31.
- Gates – a census-designated place in the eastern part of the town.
- Gates Center – a hamlet in the eastern part of the town, mostly within the Gates CDP, at the junction of NY 33 and Howard Road.
- North Gates – a hamlet (and census-designated place) in the northeastern part of the town on Long Pond Road.
- Tressmar - a hamlet on the conjoined NY 33A (Chili Avenue) and NY 204.
