= Gates Center, New York =

- Hamlet
- Location within New York Location within the United States
- Coordinates: 43°9′12″N 77°41′28″W
- Country: United States
- State: New York
- County: Monroe
- Town: Gates
- Time zone: UTC-5 (Eastern (EST))
  - Summer (DST): UTC-4 (EDT)
- ZIP Codes: 14624, 14606 (Gates)
- Area code: 585

Gates Center is a hamlet within the town of Gates in Monroe County, New York, United States. It occupies the southern part of the census-designated place (CDP) of Gates.

The hamlet of Gates Center is served by Gates-Chili Central School District.
