= Gates (CDP), New York =

Gates, New York
- Census-designated place
- Location in Monroe County and the state of New York

- Location of New York in the United States
- Coordinates: 43°9′20″N 77°41′27″W
- Country: United States
- State: New York
- County: Monroe
- Town: Gates

Area
  - Total: 1.99 sq mi (5.16 km^{2})
  - Land: 1.98 sq mi (5.13 km^{2})
  - Water: 0.012 sq mi (0.03 km^{2})
- Elevation: 555 ft (169 m)

Population (2020)
  - Total: 4,956
  - Density: 2,503.8/sq mi (966.72/km^{2})
- Time zone: UTC-5 (Eastern (EST))
  - Summer (DST): UTC-4 (EDT)
- ZIP Codes: 14606, 14624
- Area codes: 518/838
- FIPS code: 36-28453
- GNIS feature ID: 2584259

Gates is a census-designated place in the town of Gates, Monroe County, New York, United States. As of the 2020 census, it had a population of 4,956, out of 29,167 in the entire town of Gates.

The CDP is in central Monroe County, in the eastern part of the town of Gates. It is bordered to the east by the city of Rochester and to the north by the North Gates CDP. Interstate 490 passes through the center of the Gates CDP and intersects Interstate 390 in the eastern part of the CDP. New York State Route 33 (Buffalo Road) forms the southern edge of the community, and State Route 31 (Lyell Avenue) forms part of the northern edge. Downtown Rochester is 6 miles (10 km) to the east.

The hamlet of Gates Center occupies the southern half of the CDP (south of I-490), and Gates Chili High School is in the western part of the CDP.

== Demographics ==
Historical population
Census	Pop.	Note	%±
2010	4,910		—
2020	4,956		0.9%
U.S. Decennial Census
