= Monroe County, New York =

County in New York, United States

- County
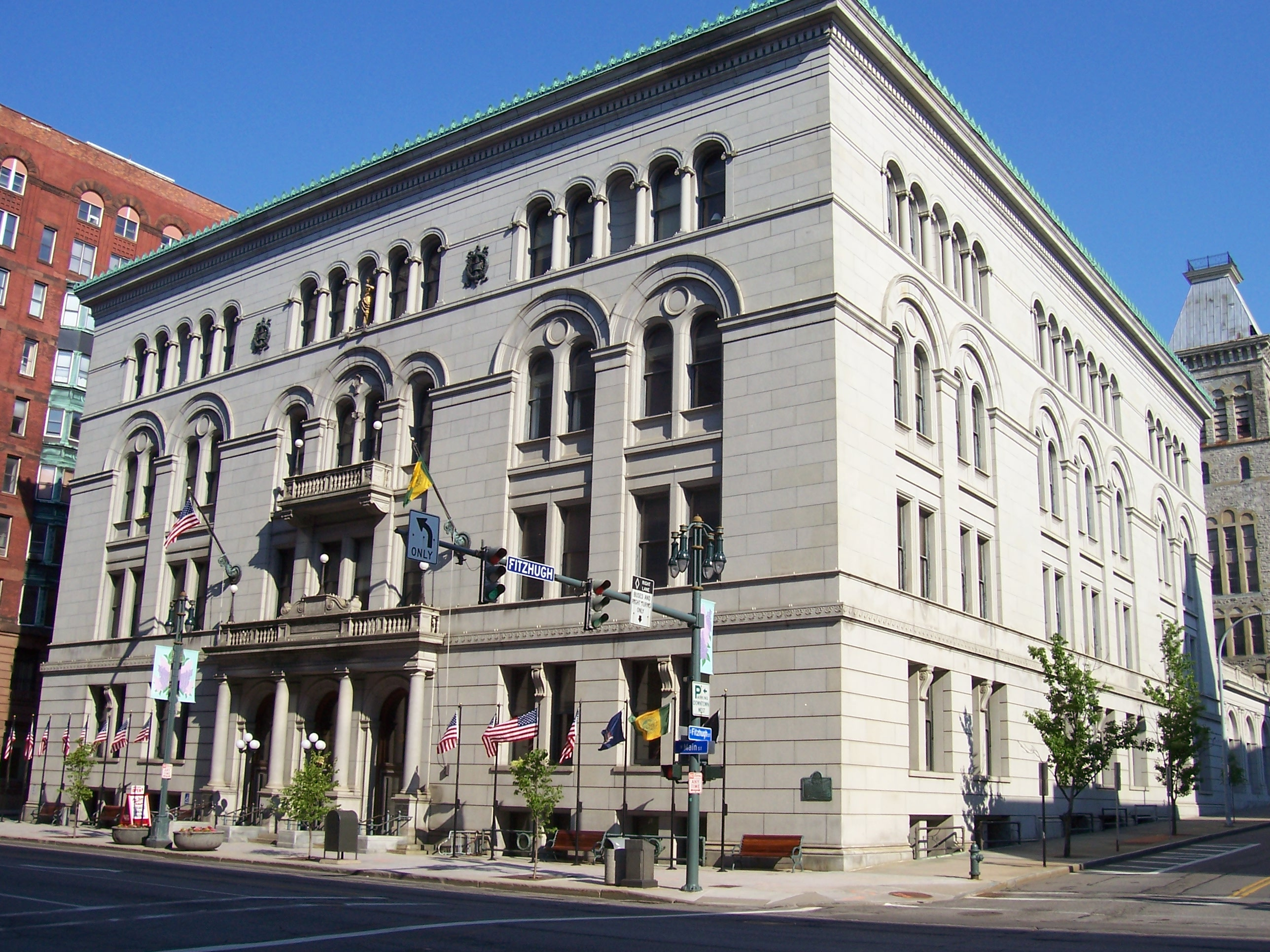
- Monroe County Gordon A. Howe Office Building on Main and Fitzhugh street in Rochester

- Flag Seal

- Location within the U.S. state of New York
- Coordinates: 43°18′N 77°41′W
- Country: United States
- State: New York
- Founded: February 23, 1821; 205 years ago
- Named for: James Monroe
- Seat: Rochester
- Largest city: Rochester

Government
  - County executive: Adam Bello (D)

Area
  - Total: 1,367 sq mi (3,540 km^{2})
  - Land: 657 sq mi (1,700 km^{2})
  - Water: 710 sq mi (1,800 km^{2}) 52%

Population (2020)
  - Total: 759,443
  - Estimate (2025): 750,506 ▼
  - Density: 1,160/sq mi (446/km^{2})
- Time zone: UTC−5 (Eastern)
  - Summer (DST): UTC−4 (EDT)
- Congressional district: 25th
- Website: www.monroecounty.gov

Monroe County is a county in the U.S. state of New York, located along Lake Ontario's southern shore. As of 2025, the population was 750,506, according to Census Bureau estimates. Its county seat and largest city is Rochester. The county is named after James Monroe, the fifth president of the United States. Monroe County is part of the upstate Rochester, NY Metropolitan Statistical Area. The county is part of the Finger Lakes region of the state.

== History ==
When counties were established in the province of New York in 1683, the present Monroe County was part of Albany County. This was an enormous county, including the northern part of the State of New York as well as all of the present State of Vermont and, in theory, extending westward to the Pacific Ocean. This county was reduced in size on July 3, 1766, by the creation of Cumberland County, and further on March 16, 1770, by the creation of Gloucester County, both containing territory now in Vermont.

On March 12, 1772, what was left of Albany County was split into three parts, one remaining under the name Albany County. One of the other pieces, Tryon County, contained the western portion (and thus, since no western boundary was specified, theoretically still extended west to the Pacific). The eastern boundary of Tryon County was approximately five miles west of the present city of Schenectady, and the county included the western part of the Adirondack Mountains and the area west of the West Branch of the Delaware River. The area then designated as Tryon County now includes 37 counties of the State of New York. The county was named for William Tryon, colonial governor of New York.

In the years prior to 1776, most of the Loyalists in Tryon County fled to Canada. In 1784, following the peace treaty that ended the American Revolutionary War, the name of Tryon County was changed to Montgomery County in order to honor the general, Richard Montgomery, who had captured several places in Canada and died attempting to capture the city of Quebec, replacing the name of the hated British governor.

In 1789, Ontario County was split off from Montgomery. The actual area split off from Montgomery County was much larger than the present county, also including the present Allegany, Cattaraugus, Chautauqua, Erie, Genesee, Livingston, Monroe, Niagara, Orleans, Steuben, Wyoming, Yates, and part of Schuyler and Wayne counties.

Genesee County was created by a splitting of Ontario County in 1802. This was much larger than the present Genesee County, however. It contained the present Allegany, Cattaraugus, Chautauqua, Erie, Niagara, Orleans, Wyoming, and portions of Livingston and Monroe counties.

Finally, Monroe County was formed from parts of Genesee and Ontario counties in 1821.

Development of the City of Rochester and the towns of Monroe County from the towns of Genesee and Ontario Counties

== Geography ==
According to the U.S. Census Bureau, the county's total area is 1,367 square miles (3,540 km^{2}), of which 657 square miles (1,700 km^{2}) is land and 710 square miles (1,800 km^{2}) (52%) is water.

Monroe County is in Western State of New York's northern tier, northeast of Buffalo and northwest of Syracuse. The northern county line is also the state line and the border of the United States, marked by Lake Ontario. Monroe County is north of the Finger Lakes.

=== Adjacent counties ===
- Wayne County - east
- Ontario County - southeast
- Livingston County - south
- Orleans County - west
- Genesee County - southwest

=== Major highways ===
- I-90 Toll / New York Thruway
- I-390
- I-490
- I-590
- New York State Route 15
- New York State Route 15A
- New York State Route 18
- New York State Route 19
- New York State Route 31
- New York State Route 31F
- New York State Route 33
- New York State Route 33A
- New York State Route 36
- New York State Route 64
- New York State Route 65
- New York State Route 96
- New York State Route 104
- New York State Route 153
- New York State Route 250
- New York State Route 251
- New York State Route 252
- New York State Route 259
- New York State Route 286
- New York State Route 390
- New York State Route 404
- New York State Route 441
- New York State Route 531
- New York State Route 590
- Lake Ontario State Parkway

== Government and politics ==
Monroe County was chartered as a municipal corporation by the New York State Legislature in 1892 and rechartered under New York's Municipal Home Rule Law in 1965.

From 1856 to 1932, Monroe County voters voted for the Republican candidate in every presidential election apart from 1912. Democratic candidate Woodrow Wilson was able to win the county in 1912 when the Republican vote was divided between then incumbent president William Howard Taft and former president Theodore Roosevelt. Monroe County voted for incumbent Democratic presidents Franklin D. Roosevelt (1936, 1940, 1944) and Harry S. Truman (1948). From 1952 to 1976, Monroe County voted for the Republican candidate in all presidential elections except for Lyndon B. Johnson's Democratic landslide in 1964. In 1980, incumbent Democratic president Jimmy Carter won Monroe County, despite having lost in the county to Republican Gerald Ford in 1976. Monroe County went back to voting Republican in 1984 and 1988, but has voted for the Democratic presidential candidate every time from 1992 onwards, including the 2024 election. In 2020, Joe Biden received the highest percentage of the vote for a Democrat since Lyndon Johnson's 1964 landslide.

In recent years, the urban area's traditional partisan dynamic appears to have begun shifting in the Democratic Party's favor at the local level. A Democrat won the 2017 race for county sheriff for the first time in decades, in 2019 Democrat Adam Bello was elected county executive after over 30 years of Republican control, in 2020 democrats Samra Brouk and Jeremy Cooney flipped state senate districts long held by the GOP, and the traditionally Republican county legislature is now split 18-11 in favor of the Democratic Party. This matches a broader national trend of increased Democratic success in suburban areas.

United States presidential election results for Monroe County, New York
Year	Republican / Whig		Democratic		Third party(ies)	
Year	No.	%	No.	%	No.	%
1828	4,694	59.88%	3,145	40.12%	0	0.00%
1832	4,906	58.65%	3,459	41.35%	0	0.00%
1836	4,887	55.41%	3,932	44.59%	0	0.00%
1840	6,468	56.84%	4,835	42.49%	77	0.68%
1844	6,873	53.22%	5,611	43.45%	430	3.33%
1848	6,539	51.53%	1,443	11.37%	4,708	37.10%
1852	7,467	51.29%	6,314	43.37%	776	5.33%
1856	7,584	49.45%	4,683	30.53%	3,070	20.02%
1860	10,808	59.72%	7,291	40.28%	0	0.00%
1864	10,203	52.84%	9,107	47.16%	0	0.00%
1868	11,682	53.83%	10,019	46.17%	0	0.00%
1872	13,033	58.44%	9,261	41.52%	9	0.04%
1876	14,738	52.71%	13,127	46.95%	93	0.33%
1880	17,102	54.87%	13,742	44.09%	327	1.05%
1884	18,325	54.89%	13,249	39.68%	1,812	5.43%
1888	21,650	54.55%	16,677	42.02%	1,361	3.43%
1892	21,327	51.41%	17,706	42.68%	2,455	5.92%
1896	26,288	58.66%	17,158	38.28%	1,372	3.06%
1900	26,691	54.62%	19,611	40.13%	2,568	5.25%
1904	30,772	60.27%	16,544	32.41%	3,737	7.32%
1908	33,250	56.69%	22,704	38.71%	2,695	4.60%
1912	16,880	33.99%	17,863	35.97%	14,919	30.04%
1916	39,393	61.68%	21,782	34.11%	2,688	4.21%
1920	73,809	63.78%	28,523	24.65%	13,389	11.57%
1924	80,577	57.09%	28,956	20.52%	31,595	22.39%
1928	99,803	55.73%	73,759	41.19%	5,516	3.08%
1932	95,964	51.60%	83,208	44.75%	6,788	3.65%
1936	93,055	44.20%	114,286	54.29%	3,182	1.51%
1940	114,383	48.45%	120,613	51.09%	1,099	0.47%
1944	111,725	48.10%	119,672	51.52%	876	0.38%
1948	109,608	48.12%	110,641	48.57%	7,544	3.31%
1952	159,172	58.89%	110,723	40.97%	370	0.14%
1956	183,747	66.83%	91,161	33.16%	23	0.01%
1960	148,423	51.19%	141,378	48.76%	147	0.05%
1964	80,099	28.05%	205,226	71.86%	257	0.09%
1968	143,233	48.27%	141,437	47.66%	12,085	4.07%
1972	196,579	61.95%	120,031	37.83%	695	0.22%
1976	167,303	55.14%	134,739	44.40%	1,392	0.46%
1980	128,615	41.93%	142,423	46.43%	35,695	11.64%
1984	182,696	57.76%	132,109	41.77%	1,472	0.47%
1988	155,271	49.85%	153,650	49.33%	2,545	0.82%
1992	134,021	39.38%	141,502	41.57%	64,846	19.05%
1996	115,694	37.32%	164,858	53.18%	29,442	9.50%
2000	141,266	44.45%	161,743	50.89%	14,816	4.66%
2004	163,545	47.67%	173,497	50.57%	6,022	1.76%
2008	144,262	40.47%	207,371	58.18%	4,791	1.34%
2012	133,362	39.95%	193,501	57.97%	6,950	2.08%
2016	136,582	39.27%	188,592	54.23%	22,616	6.50%
2020	145,661	38.23%	225,746	59.25%	9,582	2.52%
2024	145,940	40.01%	214,757	58.87%	4,084	1.12%

=== Executive branch ===
The county's executive branch is headed by the county executive, Adam Bello. The executive's office is on the first floor of the county office building on West Main Street in Rochester. The county clerk is Jamie Romeo, a Democrat.

The county was exclusively governed by a board of supervisors for the first 114 years of its history. In 1935, the position of county manager, appointed by the board, was approved by popular referendum. In 1983, the position was replaced by a county executive, directly elected by popular vote, with expanded powers (e.g., veto). In 1993, the legislature enacted term limits for the executive office of 12 consecutive years to start in 1996.

Monroe county executives
Name	Title	Party	Term
Clarence A. Smith	county manager	Republican	January 1, 1936 – December 31, 1959
Gordon A. Howe	county manager	Republican	January 1, 1960 – December 31, 1971
Lucien A. Morin	county manager county executive	Republican	January 18, 1972 – December 31, 1982; January 1, 1983 – December 31, 1986
Thomas R. Frey	county executive	Democratic	January 1, 1987 – December 31, 1991
Robert L. King	county executive	Republican	January 1, 1992 – January 14, 1995
John D. "Jack" Doyle	county executive	Republican	January 14, 1995 – December 31, 2003
Maggie Brooks	county executive	Republican	January 1, 2004 – December 31, 2015
Cheryl L. Dinolfo	county executive	Republican	January 1, 2016 – December 31, 2019
Adam J. Bello	county executive	Democratic	January 1, 2020 –

==== Sheriff ====
The Monroe County Sheriff's office (MCSO) provides law enforcement and has the constitutional authority to operate the county jail and provide civil functions. As with most counties in New York, the MCSO also performs a range of police services and provides physical and operational security to the courts. The MCSO is led by a sheriff who is elected by the residents of Monroe County, serving a 4-year term. The sheriff is considered the highest police official in the county, followed by an appointed undersheriff and subordinate chief deputy. The Monroe County Sheriff is Todd K. Baxter, a Democrat.

Organizationally, the office is composed of numerous bureaus, each responsible for a given scope of functional operations. The jail bureau is the largest component of the sheriff's office, overseeing an inmate population of around 1,000. Under the New York State Constitution, the sheriff is the warden of the county jail.

The police bureau of the sheriff's office operates a sizable road patrol force which serves municipalities within Monroe County that do not independently enforce traffic. They are also responsible for primary police patrols at the Greater Rochester International Airport and parks throughout the county. Deputies assigned to the marine unit patrol the coastline of Lake Ontario as well as Irondequoit Bay. The police bureau further employs a mounted unit, bomb squad, SWAT team, hostage recovery, criminal investigations, scuba, and canine units. The court security bureau provides security at the Hall of Justice as well as at the state appellate court building.

In 2011, the uniforms were named the 2011 Public Safety Uniform Award in the County Sheriff's/Police Department category by the North American Association of Uniform Manufacturers and Distributors (NAUMD).

=== Legislative branch ===
The county's legislative branch consists of a 29-member county legislature which replaced the earlier 43-member board of supervisors on January 1, 1967. Members meet in the legislative chambers on the fourth floor of the county office building. All 29 members of the legislature are elected from districts. There are 16 Democrats and 13 Republicans. The president of the legislature is Yversha Román, a Democrat. In 1993, the legislature enacted term limits of 10 consecutive years to start in 1996. Legislators can return to the office after not being in the legislature for a term. Since the enacting of term limits, as of 2024 four legislators (Stephanie Aldersley, Karla Boyce, Calvin Lee Jr., and Robert Colby) returned after previously leaving due to the term limit; Boyce was reelected again three times; Lee and Colby were appointed to fill vacancies before subsequently being reelected themselves; and Aldersley was appointed before being defeated for reelection.

Monroe County Legislature
District	Area	Legislator	Party	Residence	Tenure began
1	Parma, Greece	G. Blake Keller	Republican	Parma	2021
2	Hamlin, Clarkson, Sweden	Jackie Smith, Assistant Republican Leader	Republican	Clarkson	2020
3	Chili	Marvin Stepherson	Democratic	Chili	2026
4	Gates, Greece	Virginia McIntyre	Republican	Gates	2024
5	Henrietta, Mendon, Pittsford, Rush, Perinton	Richard B. Milne	Republican	Mendon	2022
6	Greece	Sean McCabe, Republican Leader	Republican	Greece	2022
7	Greece	Kirk Morris	Republican	Greece	2022
8	Webster	Mark C. Johns	Republican	Webster	2022
9	Penfield	Paul Dondorfer, Deputy Republican Leader	Republican	Penfield	2020
10	Brighton, Pittsford	Howard Maffucci	Democratic	Pittsford	2018
11	Perinton, East Rochester	John B. Baynes	Democratic	Perinton	2020
12	Henrietta, Riga, Wheatland	Nazish Jeffery	Democratic	Henrietta	2026
13	Henrietta, Pittsford	Michael Yudelson, Majority Leader	Democratic	Henrietta	2020
14	Brighton, Penfield	Susan Hughes-Smith	Democratic	Brighton	2022
15	Penfield, Webster	Frank Ciardi	Republican	Webster	2024
16	Irondequoit, Rochester	Dave Long	Democratic	Irondequoit	2022
17	Irondequoit, Rochester	Rachel Barnhart	Democratic	Rochester	2019
18	Perinton	Lystra Bartholomew McCoy	Democratic	Perinton	2024
19	Greece	Tom Sinclair	Republican	Greece	2024
20	Greece, Ogden, Sweden, Chili	Robert Colby	Republican	Ogden	2020
21	Rochester, Irondequoit	Santos Cruz	Democratic	Rochester	2024
22	Rochester	Mercedes Vazquez-Simmons, Vice President	Democratic	Rochester	2022
23	Rochester	Linda Hasman	Democratic	Rochester	2020
24	Rochester, Brighton	Albert Blankley, Assistant Majority Leader	Democratic	Rochester	2022
25	Rochester	Carolyn Delvecchio Hoffman, Assistant Majority Leader	Democratic	Rochester	2022
26	Rochester, Greece, Irondequoit	Yversha M. Román, President of the Legislature	Democratic	Rochester	2020
27	Rochester, Gates	Rose Bonnick	Democratic	Rochester	2024
28	Rochester	Ricky Frazier	Democratic	Rochester	2022
29	Rochester	William Burgess, Deputy Majority Leader	Democratic	Rochester	2022

=== Judicial branch ===
- Monroe County Court
- Monroe County Family Court, for matters involving children
- Monroe County Surrogates Court, for matters involving the deceased

=== Representation at the federal level ===
After redistricting based on the 2020 United States census, New York's 27th district was eliminated and Monroe County went from being split between two congressional districts to being wholly contained in one:

District	Areas of Monroe County	Congressperson	Party	First took office	Residence
New York's 25th congressional district	All of Monroe County	Joseph D. Morelle	Democratic	2018	Irondequoit, Monroe County

=== Representation at the state level ===
==== New York State Senate ====
After redistricting based on the 2020 United States census, Monroe County was split among four state senate districts:

District	Areas of Monroe County	Senator	Party	First took office	Residence
54	Chili, Mendon, Rush, Wheatland, Riga	Pam Helming	Republican	2017	Canandaigua, Ontario County
55	Irondequoit, Penfield, Perinton, Pittsford, East Rochester, Webster, East part of the City of Rochester	Samra Brouk	Democratic	2021	Rochester, Monroe County
56	Greece, Gates, Brighton, Henrietta, West part of the City of Rochester	Jeremy Cooney	Democratic	2021	Rochester, Monroe County
62	Clarkson, Hamlin, Parma, Ogden, Sweden	Robert Ortt	Republican	2015	North Tonawanda, Niagara County

==== New York State Assembly ====
After redistricting based on the 2020 United States census, Monroe County was split among eight state assembly districts:

District	Areas of Monroe County	Assemblyperson	Party	First took office	Residence
130	Webster	Brian Manktelow	Republican	2019	Lyons, Wayne County
133	Rush, Wheatland	Andrea Bailey	Republican	2025	Geneseo, Livingston County
134	Greece, Ogden, Parma	Josh Jensen	Republican	2021	Greece, Monroe County
135	East Rochester, Mendon, Penfield, Perinton, Pittsford	Jennifer Lunsford	Democratic	2021	Webster, Monroe County
136	Brighton, Irondequoit, northwest portion and easternmost tip of the City of Rochester	Sarah Clark	Democratic	2021	Rochester, Monroe County
137	Gates, center of the City of Rochester	Demond Meeks	Democratic	2021	Rochester, Monroe County
138	Chili, Henrietta, Riga, parts of the City of Rochester	Harry B. Bronson	Democratic	2011	Rochester, Monroe County
139	Clarkson, Hamlin, Sweden	Stephen M. Hawley	Republican	2006	Batavia, Genesee County

==== Courts ====
Monroe County is part of

- The 7th Judicial District of the New York Supreme Court.
- The 4th Division of the New York Supreme Court, Appellate Division

==== Law enforcement ====
Monroe County has eleven police forces, with residents of a number of towns relying on the county sheriff for law enforcement duties.

Agency Name	Location	Website	DCJS Accreditation	CALEA Accreditation	Relative Size
Brighton Police Department	2300 Elmwood Ave, Rochester, NY 14618	https://www.townofbrighton.org/198/Police-Department	Yes	No	Medium
Brockport Police Department	1 Clinton St, Brockport, NY 14420	https://www.brockportny.org/departments-services/police	Yes	No	Small
East Rochester Police Department	317 Main St, East Rochester, NY 14445	https://www.eastrochester.org/Police-Department	Yes	No	Small
Fairport Police Department	31 S Main St, Fairport, NY 14450	https://fairportny.com/police-department	Yes	No	Small
Gates Police Department	1605 Buffalo Rd, Rochester, NY 14624	https://www.townofgates.org/departments/police-department/	Yes	No	Medium
Greece Police Department	6 Vince Tofany Blvd, Greece, NY 14612	https://www.greecepolice.org/	Yes	Yes	Large
Irondequoit Police Department	1300 Titus Ave, Rochester, NY 14617	https://www.irondequoit.org/government/police-department/	Yes	No	Medium
Monroe County Sheriff's Office	130 S Plymouth Ave, Rochester, NY 14614	https://www.monroecounty.gov/sheriff	Yes	No	Largest in the county
Ogden Police Department	269 Ogden Center Rd, Spencerport, NY 14559	https://www.ogdenny.com/161/Police-Department	Yes	No	Small
Rochester Police Department	185 Exchange Blvd, Rochester, NY 14614	https://www.cityofrochester.gov/rpd/	Yes	Yes	Largest municipal agency
Webster Police Department	1000 Ridge Rd, Webster, NY 14580	https://www.ci.webster.ny.us/150/Police	Yes	No	Medium

== Economy ==
Monroe County is a home to a number of international businesses, including Eastman Kodak, Paychex, and Pictometry International, all of which make Monroe County their world headquarters. While no longer headquartered in Rochester, Xerox has its largest manufacturing facilities in Monroe County, and Bausch and Lomb was headquartered in Rochester until it was acquired by Valeant Pharmaceuticals. Monroe County is also home to regional businesses such as Wegmans, Roberts Communications, Inc., Holding Corp., and major fashion label Hickey Freeman.

=== High technology ===
Tech Valley, the technologically recognized area of eastern New York State, has spawned a western offshoot into the Rochester, Monroe County, and Finger Lakes areas of New York State. Since the 2000s, as the more established companies in Rochester downsized, the economy of Rochester and Monroe County has been redirected toward high technology, with new, smaller companies providing the seed capital necessary for business foundation. The Rochester and Monroe County area is important in the field of photographic processing and imaging as well as incubating an increasingly diverse high technology sphere encompassing STEM fields, in part the result of private startup enterprises collaborating with major academic institutions, including the University of Rochester and Cornell University. Given the high prevalence of imaging and optical science among the industry and the universities, Rochester is known as the world capital of imaging. The Institute of Optics of the University of Rochester and the Rochester Institute of Technology in nearby Henrietta both have imaging programs.

=== Major employers ===
Several industries occupy a major portion of the jobs located regionally, with health care comprising a significant portion of jobs in Monroe County. The University of Rochester (including its numerous hospitals) is the largest employer regionally with over 27,000 workers; Rochester Regional Health (parent company of Rochester General and Unity hospitals) is the second largest consisting of over 15,000. Wegmans is third with about 13,000 local employees.

== Demographics ==
Historical population
Census	Pop.	Note	%±
1830	49,855		—
1840	64,902		30.2%
1850	87,650		35.0%
1860	100,648		14.8%
1870	117,868		17.1%
1880	144,903		22.9%
1890	189,586		30.8%
1900	217,854		14.9%
1910	283,212		30.0%
1920	352,034		24.3%
1930	423,881		20.4%
1940	438,230		3.4%
1950	487,632		11.3%
1960	586,387		20.3%
1970	711,917		21.4%
1980	702,238		−1.4%
1990	713,968		1.7%
2000	735,343		3.0%
2010	744,344		1.2%
2020	759,443		2.0%
2025 (est.)	750,506	▼	−1.2%
U.S. Decennial Census; 1790-1960 1900-1990; 1990-2000 2010-2020

=== 2020 census ===
Monroe County, New York – Racial and ethnic composition Note: the US Census treats Hispanic/Latino as an ethnic category. This table excludes Latinos from the racial categories and assigns them to a separate category. Hispanics/Latinos may be of any race.
Race / Ethnicity (NH = Non-Hispanic)	Pop 1980	Pop 1990	Pop 2000	Pop 2010	Pop 2020	% 1980	% 1990	% 2000	% 2010	% 2020
White alone (NH)	606,442	589,723	566,763	542,034	506,153	86.36%	82.60%	77.07%	72.82%	66.65%
Black or African American alone (NH)	69,929	82,876	98,174	107,448	112,710	9.96%	11.61%	13.35%	14.44%	14.84%
Native American or Alaska Native alone (NH)	1,657	1,924	1,645	1,589	1,320	0.24%	0.27%	0.22%	0.21%	0.17%
Asian alone (NH)	5,397	12,421	17,772	24,023	32,294	0.77%	1.74%	2.42%	3.23%	4.25%
Native Hawaiian or Pacific Islander alone (NH)	x	x	166	182	181	x	x	0.02%	0.02%	0.02%
Other race alone (NH)	2,075	574	863	1,101	2,958	0.30%	0.08%	0.12%	0.15%	0.39%
Mixed race or Multiracial (NH)	x	x	10,895	13,962	31,082	x	x	1.48%	1.88%	4.09%
Hispanic or Latino (any race)	16,738	26,450	39,065	54,005	72,745	2.38%	3.70%	5.31%	7.26%	9.58%
Total	702,238	713,968	735,343	744,344	759,443	100.00%	100.00%	100.00%	100.00%	100.00%

As of the census of 2020, there were 759,443 people, 301,948 households, and 232,500 families residing in the county. The population density was 1,155 inhabitants per square mile (446/km^{2}). There were 330,247 housing units at an average density of 502 units per square mile (194 units/km^{2}). The county's racial makeup was 68.6% White, 15.7% African American, 0.3% Native American, 4.3% Asian, 0.01% Pacific Islander, 4.0% from other races, and 7.1% from two or more races. Hispanic or Latino of any race were 9.6% of the population. 18.6% were of Italian, 15.3% German, 11.3% Irish and 8.3% English ancestry according to Census 2000. In 2007, 4.64% of the population reported speaking Spanish at home, while 1.43% spoke Italian.

There were 301,948 households, out of which 54% were married couples living together, 18% had a female householder with no husband present, 6% had a male householder with no wife present, and 23% were non-families. The average household size was 2.37.

In the county, the population was spread out, with 21% being 18 or younger, 15% from 19 to 29, 13% from 30 to 39, 11% from 40 to 49, 14% from 50 to 59, 12% from 60 to 69, and 13% who were 70 years of age or older. The median age was 39 years. 52% of the population was Female, and 48% was Male

The median income for a household in the county was $62,103. The per capita income for the county was $35,797. About 12.7% of the population were below the poverty line, including 19.0% of those under age 18 and 8.0% of those age 65 or over. 90.4% of those 25 years or over was a High school graduate or higher, and 38.6% of those 25 years or over had a Bachelor's degree or higher.

According to the U.S. Religion Census of 2020, 380,869 county residents, 50.2% of the county population, adhere to a Religion. Of the 50.2% of Religious adherents, 27.5% (209,584) are Catholic, 9.4% (71,670) are Protestant, 6.0% (46,140) are Nondenominational Christians, 2.4% (18,648) are Muslim, 1.2% (9,054) are Hindu, 1.1% (8,562) are Jewish, 0.6% (5,230) are Jehovah's Witnesses, 0.6% (4,912) are Mormon, 0.5% (4,474) are Buddhist, and 0.3% (2,595) are Eastern Orthodox.

== Education ==
=== Primary and secondary education ===
The public school systems educates the overwhelming majority of Monroe County's children. The schools operated by the Roman Catholic Diocese of Rochester or Roman Catholic religious orders educate the next largest segment of children, although collectively, they are a distant second.

==== Public schools ====
There are some 25 public school districts that serve Monroe County, including the Rochester City School District, 10 suburban school districts in Monroe #1 BOCES, seven in Monroe #2–Orleans BOCES, and several primarily serving other counties (Avon, Byron–Bergen, Caledonia–Mumford, Holley, Wayne, Williamson and Victor central school districts).

Public school districts in 2016–2017
Name	BOCES	Established	District population	Professional staff	Support staff	Median teacher salary	Enrollment	Budget	Per pupil cost
Avon Central School District	?	?	?	?	?	?	?	?	?
Brighton Central School District	Monroe #1	1966	26450	372	293	$63580	3681	$74.0 million	$18444
Brockport Central School District	Monroe #2–Orleans	1927	30000	356	362	$59971	3411	$78.9 million	$23128
Byron-Bergen Central School District	?	?	?	?	?	?	?	?	?
Caledonia-Mumford Central School District	?	?	?	?	?	?	?	?	?
Churchville-Chili Central School District	Monroe #2–Orleans	1950	30000	350	322	$59752	3845	$82.6 million	$21523
East Irondequoit Central School District	Monroe #1	1956	27000	335	352	$56447	3145	$76.3 million	$24257
East Rochester Union Free School District	Monroe #1	1920	8200	125	91	$53829	1179	$27.4 million	$23282
Fairport Central School District	Monroe #1	1951	40000	645	516	$65630	5905	$123.3 million	$20874
Gates Chili Central School District	Monroe #2–Orleans	1956	35000	451	402	$61423	4123	$100.8 million	$24459
Greece Central School District	Monroe #2–Orleans	1928	96000	1127	1249	$72100	11094	$221.2 million	$19941
Hilton Central School District	Monroe #2–Orleans	1949	25323	421	367	$60407	4452	$80.0 million	$17965
Holley Central School District	Monroe #2–Orleans	1949	7774	125	87	$53366	1051	$24.4 million	$23216
Honeoye Falls-Lima Central School District	Monroe #1	1969	10500	219	205	$62074	2212	$48.5 million	$19542
Kendall Central School District	Monroe #2–Orleans	1957	3000	86	76	$53551	704	$17.4 million	$22269
Penfield Central School District	Monroe #1	1948	31000	438	477	$61612	4564	$93.3 million	$20445
Pittsford Central School District	Monroe #1	1946	33000	575	656	$67848	5685	$125.5 million	$22280
Rochester City School District	None	1841	209000	5786 (total)	5786 (total)	$61617	30217	$864.7 million	$21546
Rush-Henrietta Central School District	Monroe #1	1947	46000	613	603	$63344	5247	$119.9 million	$22838
Spencerport Central School District	Monroe #2–Orleans	1949	23000	408	351	$62348	3584	$77.1 million	$21521
Victor Central School District	?	?	?	?	?	?	?	?	?
Webster Central School District	Monroe #1	1948	54093	801	631	$66408	8549	$163.9 million	$19167
West Irondequoit Central School District	Monroe #1	1953	23754	344	258	$59855	3568	$71.2 million	$19916
Wheatland–Chili Central School District	Monroe #2–Orleans	1955	5100	80	63	$54967	691	$17.8 million	$23837

==== Private schools ====
There are three private schools that serve more than 200 students each:

- Allendale Columbia School, a college preparatory school in Pittsford
- The Harley School, a college preparatory school in Brighton
- Mary Cariola Children's Center serving children with multiple, complex disabilities in the city

There is one small, but historically significant school: Rochester School for the Deaf in the city

==== Parochial schools ====
- There are three small Judaic schools and two small Islamic schools.
- There are about ten primary schools operated by the Roman Catholic Diocese of Rochester.
- There are four senior high schools (or combined junior/senior high schools) operated by or in the tradition of a Roman Catholic religious order:

School	Founding religious order	Location	Established	Grades
Aquinas Institute	Basilian	City of Rochester	1902	6–12
Bishop Kearney High School	Christian Brothers, Sisters of Notre Dame	Irondequoit	1962	6–12
McQuaid Jesuit High School	Jesuits	Brighton	1954	6–12
Our Lady of Mercy School for Young Women	Sisters of Mercy	Brighton	1928	6–12

- There are more than two dozen schools operated by various sects of Christianity, two of which serve more than 200 students:

School	Religious affiliation	Location	Established	Grades
The Charles Finney School	Non-denominational Christian	Penfield	1992	K–12
Northstar Christian Academy	Baptist	Gates	1972	K–12

=== Colleges and universities ===
The county is home to nine colleges and universities:

- Bryant & Stratton College in Greece and Henrietta
- Colgate Rochester Crozer Divinity School in the city
- Monroe Community College in Brighton with a campus in the city
- Nazareth University in Pittsford
- Roberts Wesleyan College in Chili
- Rochester Institute of Technology in Henrietta
- St. Bernard's School of Theology and Ministry in Pittsford
- St. John Fisher University in Pittsford
- SUNY Brockport (also known as the State University of New York Brockport) in Brockport with a campus in Rochester
- University of Rochester in Rochester

Additionally, three colleges maintain satellite campuses in Monroe County:

- The Cornell University School of Industrial and Labor Relations maintains an office in the city
- Empire State College maintains the Genesee Valley Learning Center in Irondequoit
- Ithaca College's Department of Physical Therapy leases part of the Colgate Rochester Crozer Divinity School facility for teaching and research

== Parks and recreation ==
=== County parks ===
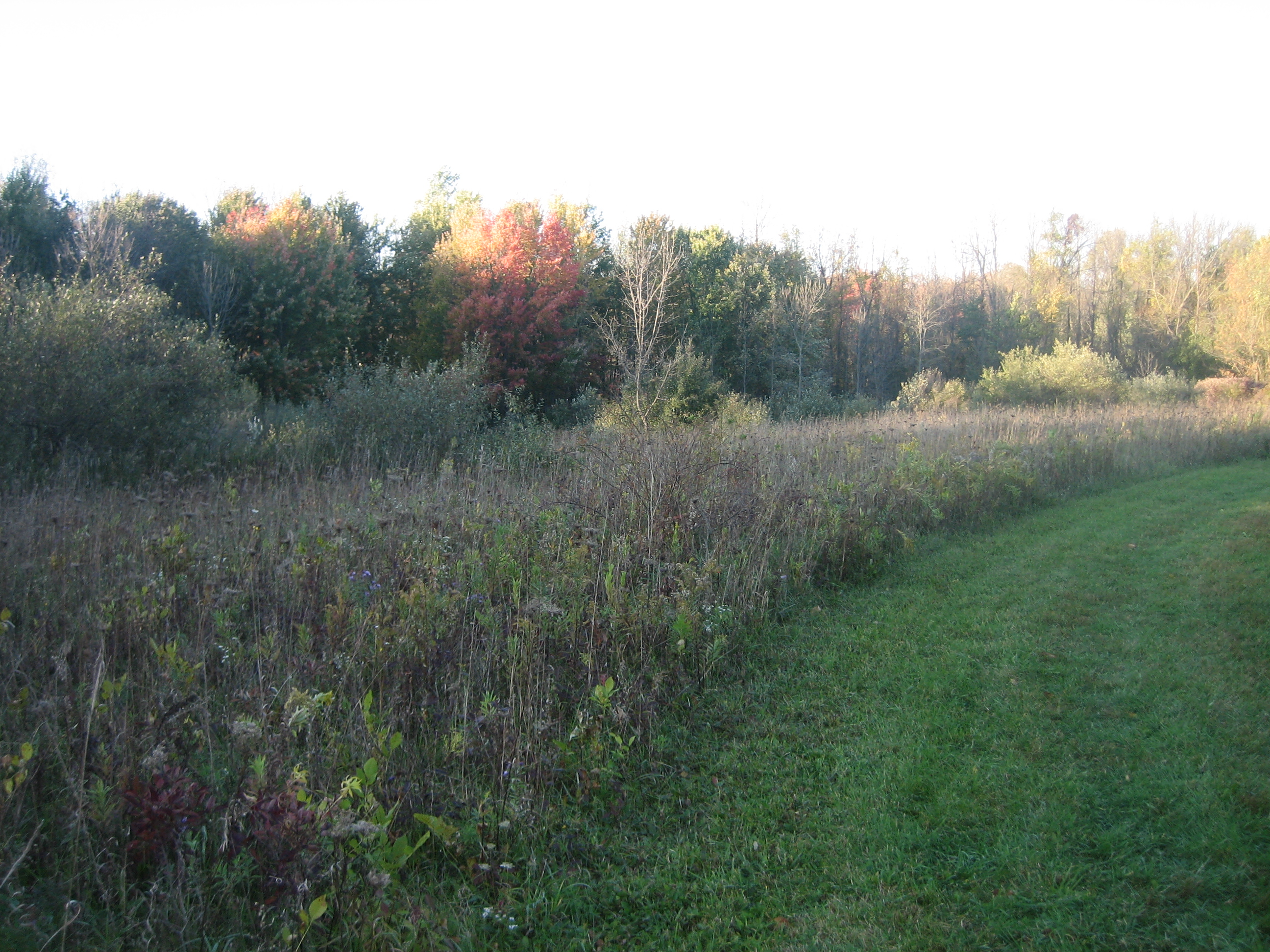
Wetlands Trail in Black Creek Park

The following is a list of parks owned and maintained by Monroe County:

- Abraham Lincoln Park
- Black Creek Park
- Churchville Park
- Devil's Cove Park
- Durand Eastman Park
- Ellison Park
- Genesee Valley Park
- Greece Canal Park
- Highland Park
- Irondequoit Bay Park West
- Lehigh Valley Trail Park
- Lucian Morin Park
- Mendon Ponds Park
- Northampton Park
- Oatka Creek Park
- Ontario Beach Park
- Powder Mills Park
- Seneca Park
- Seneca Park Zoo
- Tryon Park
- Webster Park

=== State parks ===
The following is a list of parks owned and maintained by New York State:

- Hamlin Beach State Park
- Irondequoit Bay State Marine Park

=== Golf courses ===
- Arrowhead Golf Course & Marina
- Deerfield Golf & Country Club
- Durand Eastman Golf Course
- Genesee Valley Golf Course
- Majestic Hills Golf Course
- Mill Creek Golf Club
- Morgan's Crossing
- Monroe Golf Club
- Shadow Lake Golf & Racquet Club
- Timber Ridge Golf Club
- White Birch Golf Course

== Communities ==
The town, village, and city borders

=== Larger settlements ===
#	Location	Population	Type	Area
1	Rochester	211,328	City	Inner Rochester
2	Irondequoit	51,692	Town/CDP	Inner Rochester
3	Brighton	37,137	Town	Inner Rochester
4	Greece	96,926	Town	Inner Rochester
5	Gates	29,167	Town	Inner Rochester
6	North Gates	9,512	CDP	Inner Rochester
7	Brockport	8,366	Village	West
8	Rochester Institute of Technology	7,322	CDP	Inner Rochester
9	East Rochester	6,587	Town/village	Inner Rochester
10	Hilton	5,886	Village	West
11	Hamlin	5,521	CDP	West
12	Webster	5,399	Village	Inner Rochester
13	Fairport	5,353	Village	Inner Rochester
14	Gates	4,910	CDP	Inner Rochester
15	Clarkson	4,358	CDP	West
16	Spencerport	3,601	Village	West
17	Honeoye Falls	2,674	Village	Southeast
18	Scottsville	2,001	Village	Southwest
19	Churchville	1,961	Village	Southwest
20	Nazareth College	1,182	CDP	Inner Rochester
21	Pittsford	1,355	Village	Inner Rochester
22	St. John Fisher University	1,307	CDP	Inner Rochester

=== Towns ===
- Brighton
- Chili
- Clarkson
- East Rochester
- Gates
- Greece
- Hamlin
- Henrietta
- Irondequoit
- Mendon
- Ogden
- Parma
- Penfield
- Perinton
- Pittsford
- Riga
- Rush
- Sweden
- Webster
- Wheatland

=== Hamlets ===
In New York, the term hamlet, while not defined in law, is used to describe an unincorporated community and geographic location within a town. The town in which each hamlet is located is in parentheses.

- Genesee Junction (Chili)
- Egypt (Perinton)
- Adams Basin (Ogden)
- Bushnell's Basin (Perinton)
- Gates Center (Gates)
- Garbutt (Scottsville)
- Mumford (Wheatland)
- Union Hill (Webster)
- Mendon Center (Mendon)
- Seabreeze (Irondequoit)
- Summerville (Irondequoit)
- Parma Center (Parma)
- Riga Center (Riga)
- Sweden Center (Sweden)
- West Webster (Webster)
- North Chili (Chili)
- Clarkson Corners (Clarkson)
- Clifton (Chili)
- Industry (Rush)
- Belcoda (Wheatland)
- Coldwater (Gates)
- Barnard (Greece)
- Beattie Beach (Greece)
- Braddock Bay (Greece)
- Braddock Heights (Greece)
- Elmgrove (Greece)
- Grandview Heights (Greece)
- Grand View Beach (Greece)
- North Greece (Greece)
- Ridgemont (Greece)
- West Greece (Greece)

== See also ==
- List of people from Rochester, New York
- Monroe County, New York Sheriff's Office
- National Register of Historic Places listings in Monroe County, New York
