= Mason House =

Mason House may refer to:

- Mason House (Bradford, Arkansas), listed on the NRHP in White County, Arkansas
- Walt Mason House, in Emporia, Kansas, listed on the NRHP in Lyon County, Kansas
- Peter Mason House, in Danville, Kentucky, listed on the NRHP in Boyle County, Kentucky
- Sue Shelby Mason House, in Lancaster, Kentucky, listed on the NRHP in Garrard County, Kentucky
- Mason House (Richmond, Kentucky), listed on the NRHP in Madison County, Kentucky
- Haynes Mason House, in Upton, Kentucky, listed on the NRHP in Hardin County, Kentucky
- Mason House (Shreveport, Louisiana), listed on the NRHP in Caddo Parish, Louisiana
- Dr. Moses Mason House, in Bethel, Maine, listed on the NRHP in Oxford County, Maine
- John Mason House (Lexington, Massachusetts), NRHP-listed
- John Mason House (Winchester, Massachusetts), NRHP-listed
- Josiah Mason Jr. House, in Cambridge, Massachusetts, NRHP-listed
- N. S. Mason House, in Taunton, Massachusetts, NRHP-listed
- W. A. Mason House, in Cambridge, Massachusetts, NRHP-listed
- William P. Mason House, in Swansea, Massachusetts, NRHP-listed
- John W. Mason House, in Fergus Falls, Minnesota, listed on the NRHP in Otter Tail County, Minnesota
- Mason House (Dublin, New Hampshire), NRHP-listed
- Mason–Watkins House, in Surry, New Hampshire, NRHP-listed
- George G. Mason House, in Webster, New York, NRHP-listed
- Mason–Lloyd–Wiley House, Chapel Hill, North Carolina, historic house, home of Thomas F. Lloyd
- John A. Mason House, in Farrington, North Carolina, listed on the NRHP in Chatham County, North Carolina
- Mason–Hardee–Capel House, in Garysburg, North Carolina, listed on the NRHP in Northampton County, North Carolina
- Frank H. Mason House, in Akron, Ohio, listed on the NRHP in Summit County, Ohio
- John Wesley Mason Gothic Cottage, in Braceville, Ohio, listed on the NRHP in Trumbull County, Ohio
- Mason House (Coal Run, Ohio), NRHP-listed
- James Mason House, in Mentor, Ohio, listed on the NRHP in Lake County, Ohio
- Israel B. Mason House, Providence, Rhode Island, NRHP-listed
- Charles T. Mason House, in Sumter, South Carolina, listed on the NRHP in Sumter County, South Carolina
- Mason–Hughes House, in San Angelo, Texas, listed on the NRHP in Tom Green County, Texas
- Mason House (Guilford, Virginia), listed on the NRHP in Accomack County, Virginia
- Mason–Tillett House, in Valentines, Virginia, NRHP-listed
- Mason–Drennen House, in Drennen, West Virginia, NRHP-listed
- James Mason House and Farm, in Hedgesville, West Virginia, NRHP-listed

== See also ==
- John Mason House (disambiguation)
