= John Mason House =

John Mason House may refer to:

- John Mason House (Lexington, Massachusetts), listed on the NRHP in Massachusetts
- John Mason House (Winchester, Massachusetts), listed on the NRHP in Massachusetts
- John W. Mason House, in Fergus Falls, Minnesota, listed on the NRHP in Otter Tail County, Minnesota

== See also ==
- Mason House (disambiguation)
