= Brian Kozlowski =

American football player (born 1970)

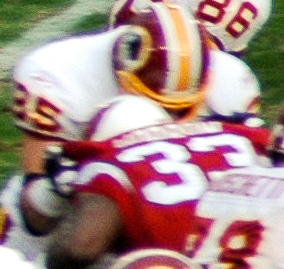
- Kozlowski (85) with the Redskins in 2005

No. 85, 82, 86, 41
- Position: Tight end

Personal information
- Born: October 4, 1970 (age 56); Rochester, New York, U.S.
- Listed height: 6 ft 3 in (1.91 m)
- Listed weight: 265 lb (120 kg)

Career information
- High school: Webster (Webster, New York); Fork Union Military Academy (Fork Union, Virginia)
- College: UConn
- NFL draft: 1993: undrafted

Career history
- New York Giants (1993–1996); Atlanta Falcons (1997–2003); Washington Redskins (2004–2007)

Awards and highlights
- 2× Second-team All-Yankee Conference (1990, 1992)

Career NFL statistics
- Receptions: 85
- Receiving yards: 978
- Receiving touchdowns: 8
- Stats at Pro Football Reference

Brian Scott Kozlowski (born October 4, 1970) is an American former professional football player who was a tight end in the National Football League (NFL). He was originally signed by the New York Giants as an undrafted free agent in 1993. He played college football for the Connecticut Huskies.

== Early life ==
As a high schooler, Kozlowski was team MVP and an All-County pick on offense for his high school, Webster High School. He also got second-team honors for defense plus he played lacrosse.

== College career ==
In college, Kozlowski was known for being consistent as he started at tight end for 43 straight games. In the second game of his career as a freshman, he won the starting job. He caught 43 passes for 526 yards with a touchdown in 1992, his final college season. He was part of the group of receivers that set a school record for most receptions by three different receivers in 1991 with 207. He is one of only four true freshmen at the University of Connecticut to earn a varsity letter. Kozlowski's best game as a college player came against Villanova as the sophomore caught ten passes. The Brian Kozlowski Award is given annually in honor of Kozlowski for his hard work, effort and dedication to the game. In college, Brian achieved notoriety in college by dating Rebecca Lobo. The couple were awarded the "Husky" couple award in 1991.

== Professional career ==
Kozlowski was signed as an undrafted free agent by the New York Giants in May 1993. He played three years with the Giants. After becoming a free agent, Kozlowski signed with the Atlanta Falcons. Most of his career productivity came playing for the Falcons. Playing for the Falcons, he went to Super Bowl XXXIII, caught one pass for five yards but ended up losing 34–19 to the Denver Broncos. At the end of the 2000 season, Kozlowski re-signed with the Falcons. He did the same thing at the end of the 2001 and 2002 seasons. He declared free agency after the 2003 season and signed with the Washington Redskins only to be cut in October 2004. Kozlowski appeared in all 16 games for the Washington Redskins in 2005 with two receptions for 26 yards. After Clinton Portis broke his hand in a Week 10 loss to the Philadelphia Eagles and was placed on the injured reserve for the remainder of the 2006 season, the Redskins re-signed Kozlowski to use him mostly as a blocker and on special teams. Kozlowski finished his career with 85 receptions for 978 yards and eight touchdowns.

== Personal life ==
Kozlowski has a wife, Ellen and two daughters, Paris and Shea. They currently reside in California.
