= Webster (village), New York =

Webster, New York
- Village
- Location in Monroe County and the state of New York

- Location of New York in the United States
- Coordinates: 43°12′43″N 77°25′38″W
- Country: United States
- State: New York
- County: Monroe
- Town: Webster
- Incorporated: 1905; 121 years ago

Government
  - Mayor: Darrell Byerts

Area
  - Total: 2.20 sq mi (5.71 km^{2})
  - Land: 2.20 sq mi (5.71 km^{2})
  - Water: 0 sq mi (0.00 km^{2})
- Elevation: 442 ft (135 m)

Population (2020)
  - Total: 5,651
  - Density: 2,565.4/sq mi (990.52/km^{2})
- Time zone: UTC-5 (EST)
  - Summer (DST): UTC-4 (EDT)
- ZIP Code: 14580
- Area code: 585
- FIPS code: 36-78960
- Website: www.villageofwebsterny.gov

Webster is a village in Monroe County, New York, United States. The population was 5,651 at the time of the 2020 census. The village and town are named after orator and statesman Daniel Webster. The village was incorporated in 1905.

== History ==
The village of Webster has historically served as the core of the town of Webster. The commercial section of the village dates back to 1812, when the first two buildings were constructed near the present four corners. One of these buildings was a store and the other a tavern. From this modest beginning, the community and its center began to grow, becoming the commercial, social, and educational center of the town.

The history of the village center reflects the changing economy of the community. The village core was originally an agricultural center and distribution point for the town. The junction of Ridge Road and Webster Nine-Mile Point Road, which connected shipping points on the Erie Canal and the New York Central Railroad with a small port on Lake Ontario, was referred to as "the Village" because of a concentration of population and businesses. The railroad at the north end of the village attracted dried or evaporated apple businesses and small wood-working industries. The village continued to be the shipping center for the area's dried apple industry until well after World War I. The village also had the world's largest basket factory and was the center for the canning industry in Monroe County.

At the beginning of the 1900s, several events significantly influenced the development of the village and its downtown core. The first bank since the Civil War era was established in the core area, and the Rochester-Sodus Bay Trolley connected Webster to Rochester, leading to a major expansion of the village residential area. In 1905, the village was incorporated, followed by municipal infrastructure improvements and services including fire protection, water service and sewage disposal.

As the primary commercial hub of the area, the village of Webster became the focus of the community's social life. The presence of the post office, library, banks, and government offices all served to bring people into the area. Further, commercial buildings had several functions, providing retail space on the ground floor and offices or residential apartments on the upper floors. These tenants provided sufficient rental income for property owners to make a profit and properly maintain their buildings.

After World War II, there were striking changes that transformed Webster's character. First, the agricultural nature of the area has seen major encroachment by suburban growth moving outward from Rochester. The town of Webster became one of the major suburban residential areas in Monroe County, with its population more than doubling between 1950 and 1960. Substantial residential development has continued to the present. As a consequence, the agricultural industry that made the village center a market point and an administrative, social, and institutional center has diminished. Secondly, decisions made in the 1950s and 1960s by the former Haloid Company, now Xerox, to invest in major office, research and manufacturing facilities to be located in the village and the town of Webster brought about extensive changes in population growth trends in the area. The construction of Route 104 also contributed greatly to the area's growth as access to the metropolitan area was vastly improved. Along with population growth, there has been significant commercial expansion in the village.

The Jayne and Mason Bank Building, William C. Jayne House, George G. Mason House, and Webster Baptist Church are listed on the National Register of Historic Places.

== Geography ==
Webster is located in northeastern Monroe County at 43°12′43″N 77°25′38″W (43.212113, -77.427292). It is in the southeastern part of the town of Webster and is 12 miles (19 km) east-northeast of downtown Rochester. New York State Route 104 passes through the northern part of the village as a four-lane expressway, leading west into Irondequoit and the northern part of Rochester and east, mostly as a two-lane highway, 19 miles (31 km) to Sodus. State Route 404 passes through the center of Webster along Ridge Road, running parallel to Route 104 and leading 3 miles (5 km) east to Union Hill and west 7 miles (11 km) to State Route 590 just outside of Rochester. State Route 250 passes through Webster as North Avenue and South Avenue, leading north 3.5 miles (5.6 km) to its terminus at Lake Ontario and south 8 miles (13 km) to Fairport.

According to the U.S. Census Bureau, the village of Webster has a total area of 2.2 square miles (5.7 km^{2}), all land.

== Demographics ==
Historical population
Census	Pop.	Note	%±
1870	291		—
1880	381		30.9%
1890	634		66.4%
1910	1,032		—
1920	1,247		20.8%
1930	1,552		24.5%
1940	1,680		8.2%
1950	1,773		5.5%
1960	3,060		72.6%
1970	5,037		64.6%
1980	5,499		9.2%
1990	5,464		−0.6%
2000	5,216		−4.5%
2010	5,399		3.5%
2020	5,651		4.7%
U.S. Decennial Census

As of the census of 2000, there were 5,216 people, 2,231 households, and 1,345 families residing in the village. The population density was 2,376.2 inhabitants per square mile (917.5/km^{2}). There were 2,304 housing units at an average density of 1,049.6 per square mile (405.3/km^{2}). The racial makeup of the village was 89.07% White, 4.10% Black or African American, 0.31% Native American, 3.66% Asian, 0.81% from other races, and 2.05% from two or more races. Hispanic or Latino of any race were 2.09% of the population.

There were 2,231 households, out of which 32.1% had children under the age of 18 living with them, 42.3% were married couples living together, 14.8% had a female householder with no husband present, and 39.7% were non-families. 34.2% of all households were made up of individuals, and 10.8% had someone living alone who was 65 years of age or older. The average household size was 2.30 and the average family size was 2.98.

In the village, the population was spread out, with 26.3% under the age of 18, 7.3% from 18 to 24, 32.6% from 25 to 44, 19.8% from 45 to 64, and 14.1% who were 65 years of age or older. The median age was 35 years. For every 100 females, there were 88.4 males. For every 100 females age 18 and over, there were 83.5 males.

The median income for a household in the village was $38,651, and the median income for a family was $49,471. Males had a median income of $39,613 versus $25,446 for females. The per capita income for the village was $21,317. About 8.3% of families and 11.9% of the population were below the poverty line, including 12.5% of those under age 18 and 6.5% of those age 65 or over.

== Parks ==
There are five parks within the village of Webster comprising over 24 acres (97,000 m^{2}) of parkland which provide a variety of facilities, the including tennis courts, baseball diamonds, playground equipment, and picnic areas. These include the Schantz Village Manor Park, the Milton R. Case Memorial Park, the Wilmorite Playground, the Veterans Memorial Park on North Avenue, and Harmony Park at the corner of Foster Drive and Phillips Road. The Veterans Memorial Park contains a large gazebo which is the location of the 9/11 commemoration, the Veterans Day service, the summer Friday night concert series, and the summer Movies in the Park series. The Village Days Festival takes place each year in August along Main Street and in the Veterans Memorial Park. The Village Band Shell is at Harmony Park. The band plays concerts in the band shell on most Thursday evenings throughout the summer.

The town of Webster's North Ponds Park is located just north of the village boundary and has facilities for hiking, picnicking, and fishing. A paved bike path located adjacent to the expressway is easily accessible to village residents. The town of Webster parks and recreation center is located adjacent to the village on Chiyoda Drive. This department offers recreational activities as well as hot meals during the week for all town and village senior citizens.

== Government ==
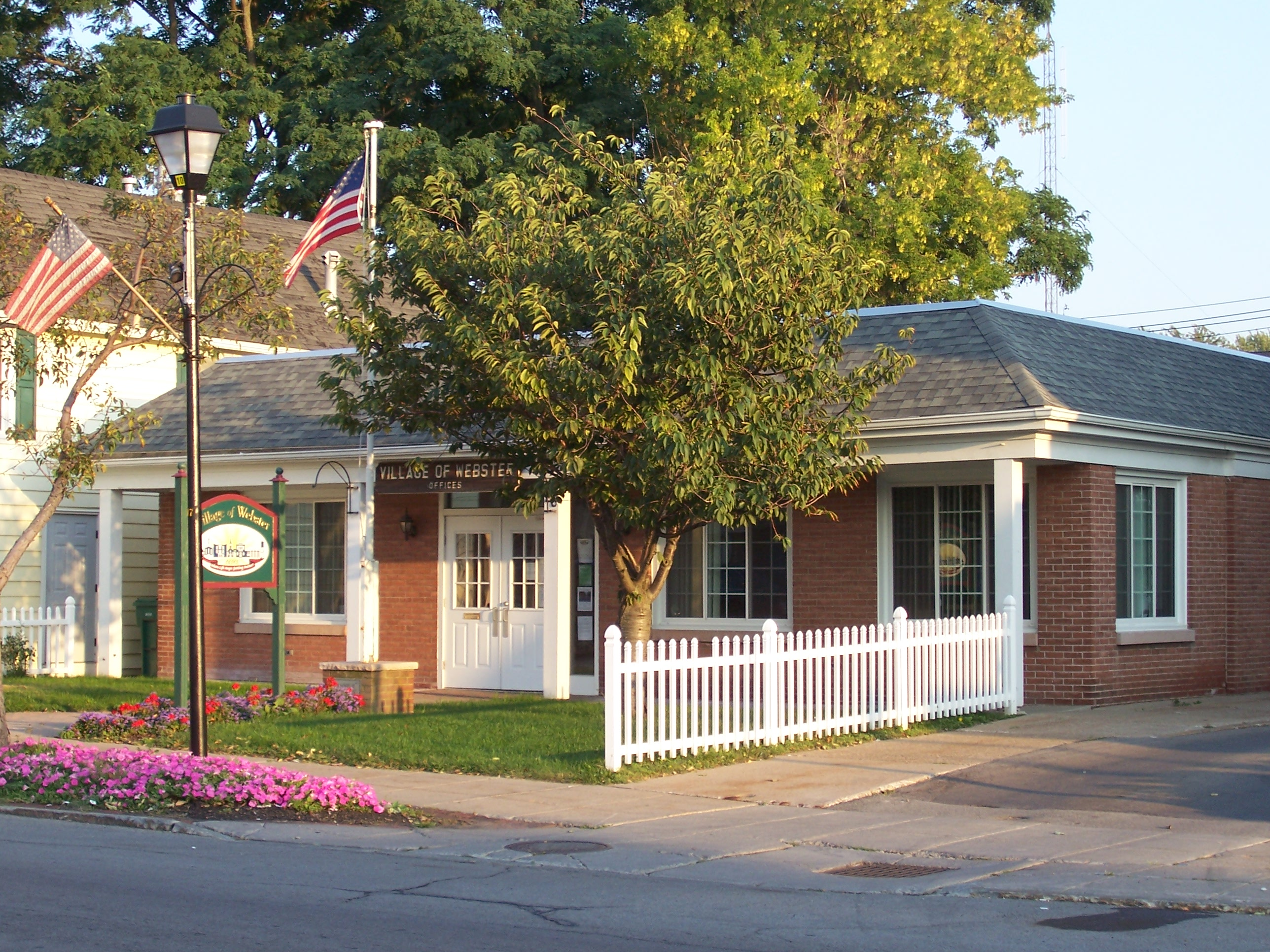
The Webster village hall

The village is governed by Mayor Darrell Byerts and four trustees. The village board meets on the second and fourth Thursdays of each month at 7:00 PM. The village of Webster has a planning board and zoning board of appeals, which normally meet on the first and third Thursdays of the month, respectively. The village board has established numerous residents' committees including an historic preservation committee, a parks and recreation committee, a senior and disabled committee, and a water committee. Two members of the village board, the mayor and a trustee, are members of the business improvement district board of directors and the farmers market committee. The mayor is a member of the Webster Community Coalition for Economic Development board of directors.

== Services ==
Water is provided by the Monroe County Water Authority. The village's public works department personnel plow the streets and sidewalks during the winter and maintain the roads and parks during the summer. Also once a month tree limbs are picked up year around, and in the fall leaves are picked up and composted by village employees.
