= Webster Baptist Church =

Webster Baptist Church may refer to:

- Webster Baptist Church (Webster, New York), listed on the National Register of Historic Places (NRHP)
- Webster Baptist Church (Webster, North Carolina), also NRHP-listed
