= Webster Public Library =

Library in Monroe County, New York

Coordinates: 43°12′40″N 77°27′34″W

The Webster Public Library is a public library building located in the Town of Webster, Monroe County, New York, United States, just outside Rochester, New York.

== History ==
The first public library in Webster, New York was built in 1929. At that time it was housed in a single room of the high school, and had a collection of 657 books. In 1957 the library was moved to the Emil Reitz building on Main Street in the Village of Webster and in 1959 the library relocated, once again, to a new facility in a wing of the Town Hall on Ridge Road. The library was moved again in 1975 to 1 Van Ingen Drive, which is located behind the current Town Hall complex. The Webster Public Library moved to 980 Ridge Road in the old Ames building which was across the street from the library's old Van Ingen Drive building. In 2016, the entrance moved from the south side to the north side of the Webster Plaza. It is now accessible from Van Ingen Drive. The address has stayed the same.

== Current information ==
The Webster Public Library is a member of the Monroe County Library System and has free wi-fi. The library employs seven full time librarians, one full-time network administrator, one full-time clerk, and approximately fifty-two part-time library assistants, clerks and pages. The library also offers regular adult, teen, and children's programs. The library has a large community room and three smaller study rooms. When not scheduled for use by the library, the community room is available for use by local non-profit groups.

== Collection information ==
The library's collection consists of over 241,000 items including: books, magazines, CDs, DVDs, Blu-rays, books on CDs, Playaways, video games (WiiU, Xbox One, PS4, Switch, PS5), experience kits, wi-fi hotspots, kindle fires, empire passes, VIP passes, light therapy lamps, CD players, DVD players, and e-books and e-audiobooks.
