= Shipbuilder's Creek =

Location
- Country: United States
- State: New York

Physical characteristics
- Mouth: Lake Ontario
  - location: Webster, New York, United States
  - coordinates: 43.2494169°N 77.5024771°W
- Length: 20.3 m (67 ft)
- Basin size: 8.25 mi^{2} (21.4 km^{2})

Shipbuilder's Creek is a small stream in Penfield and Webster, Monroe County, New York flowing roughly south to north, it is 20.3 miles (32.7 km) in length before emptying into Lake Ontario in the Webster hamlet of Forest Lawn.

The creek is so named because it was the site of boat construction for the War of 1812.

In 2007, aquatic life and recreational uses were thought to be impaired. A restoration project was begun in 2018 to restore the water quality of the creek. The Vosburg Hollow Nature Trail in Webster provides access to the lower section of the creek.
