= Pat Kelly (American football) =

American football player (1965–2003)

No. 86, 87, 47, 82
- Position: Tight end

Personal information
- Born: October 29, 1965; Rochester, New York, U.S.
- Died: March 27, 2003 (aged 37); Charlottesville, Virginia, U.S.
- Listed height: 6 ft 6 in (1.98 m)
- Listed weight: 252 lb (114 kg)

Career information
- High school: R.L. Thomas (Webster, New York)
- College: Syracuse
- NFL draft: 1988: 7th round, 174th overall pick

Career history
- Denver Broncos (1988–1989); New York Jets (1990–1991)

Awards and highlights
- Second-team All-East (1987); Syracuse Zunic Award

Career NFL statistics
- Receptions: 4
- Receiving yards: 17
- Return yards: 4
- Stats at Pro Football Reference

Patrick Joseph Kelly II (October 29, 1965 – March 27, 2003) was an American professional football tight end who played for the Denver Broncos (1988–1989) and New York Jets (1990–1991) of the National Football League (NFL). He was selected by the Broncos in the seventh round of the 1988 NFL draft with the 174th overall pick. He played in 44 games over 4 seasons, starting only the 1988 AFC Championship due to an injury to starter Clarence Kay. Kelly also played in Super Bowl XXIV. He died of cancer on March 27, 2003.

== Early life ==
Kelly attended R. L. Thomas High School in Webster, New York, before heading to Syracuse, New York to play with the Syracuse Orange football team. Head Coach Greg Robinson said of him,

...There was Pat Kelly. Pat Kelly – what a character. This guy was as bright as they came. He was at the Jets, and at the Broncos, went on and was doing a wonderful job on Wall Street. Pat was the kind of guy who he could turn a locker room because of the way he could disrupt it with his sense of humor. He could take over a whole football team. He was a guy who everybody not only remembered as a player, but also as a person. Sadly, we lost Pat not too long ago. He is always remembered for what he was – a special person.

Kelly also won the Zunic Award, which is given annually to anyone who exhibits the courage and spirit of Mike and Judy Zunic. More specifically, it usually signifies overcoming a severe injury.

== After football ==
After leaving the NFL, Kelly became a successful businessman. This led to him co-creating the Joshua Frase Foundation in the fall of 1996, a foundation devoted to raising funds for research into Centronuclear myopathy and related congenital myopathies, with friend and former Syracuse/New York Jets teammate Paul Frase. Frase's son Joshua, whom the foundation is named for, suffered from centronuclear myopathy and died on December 24, 2010, at the age of 15. Kelly also created the JFF Muscle Dream Team Gala and helped raise millions of dollars for the foundation.
