= Xceed Financial Credit Union =

Defunct American credit union (1964–2021)

- Company type: Credit union
- Industry: Financial services
- Founded: 1964
- Defunct: April 1, 2021
- Fate: Merged with Kinecta Federal Credit Union
- Successor: Kinecta Federal Credit Union
- Headquarters: El Segundo, California, U.S.
- Key people: Teresa Freeborn, President and Chief Executive
- Total assets: $1B under management USD (2016)
- Number of employees: 200+
- Website: xfcu.org (Archived)

Xceed Financial Credit Union was a federally chartered credit union and financial institution that served Xerox, OfficeMax, Seneca Park Zoo, Heal the Bay, Webster Public Library, Alorica, and more than 300 additional select employer groups (SEGs), organizations, and communities nationwide. It operated Financial Centers and sales offices in five states.

As a federally chartered credit union, Xceed Financial Credit Union was governed by the National Credit Union Administration (NCUA), the federal agency responsible for regulating federal credit unions.

== History ==
Xceed Financial Credit Union started in 1964 as Scientific Data Systems Credit Union and became Xerox Federal Credit Union in 1970. In April, 2008, the credit union changed its name to Xceed Financial Credit Union, and was typically referred to as Xceed or Xceed Financial. It had nearly $1 billion in assets under management and 70,000 members.

In April 2021 Xceed merged into Kinecta Federal Credit Union.

== Products and services ==
Xceed Financial offered the following:

- Share accounts (checking, savings, money market, certificate, individual retirement accounts, health savings accounts)
- New and used consumer loans (auto, boat, recreational vehicle, motorcycle)
- Real estate (fixed- and adjustable-rate mortgages, home equity loan)
- Insurance services (personal and home)
- Electronic services (online banking, mobile banking, electronic bill payment, electronic statements)
- Investment, insurance, and financial planning services through LPL Financial
- Business banking (share accounts and loans)

== Locations ==
California

- El Segundo
- Menlo Park
- San Jose

New Jersey

- Parsippany

New York

- Pittsford (town)
- Rochester
- Webster (town)
