= Union Hill, New York =

Hamlet in Monroe & Wayne County, New Yourk

Coordinates: 43°13′22″N 77°22′18″W

Union Hill is a hamlet on the border of the town of Ontario in Wayne County and the town of Webster in Monroe County, New York, United States.

The primary cross roads where the hamlet is located are N.Y. Route 404, Ridge Road (CR 103), and County Line Road (CR 100).

A post office is located in Union Hill with a ZIP Code of 14563.

The Union Hill Fire Department ceased operations on January 1, 2020, after 76 years of continuous operation. The Union Hill Volunteer Ambulance closed three months later.
