= Jayne and Mason Bank Building =

Historic commercial building in New York, United States

- U.S. National Register of Historic Places
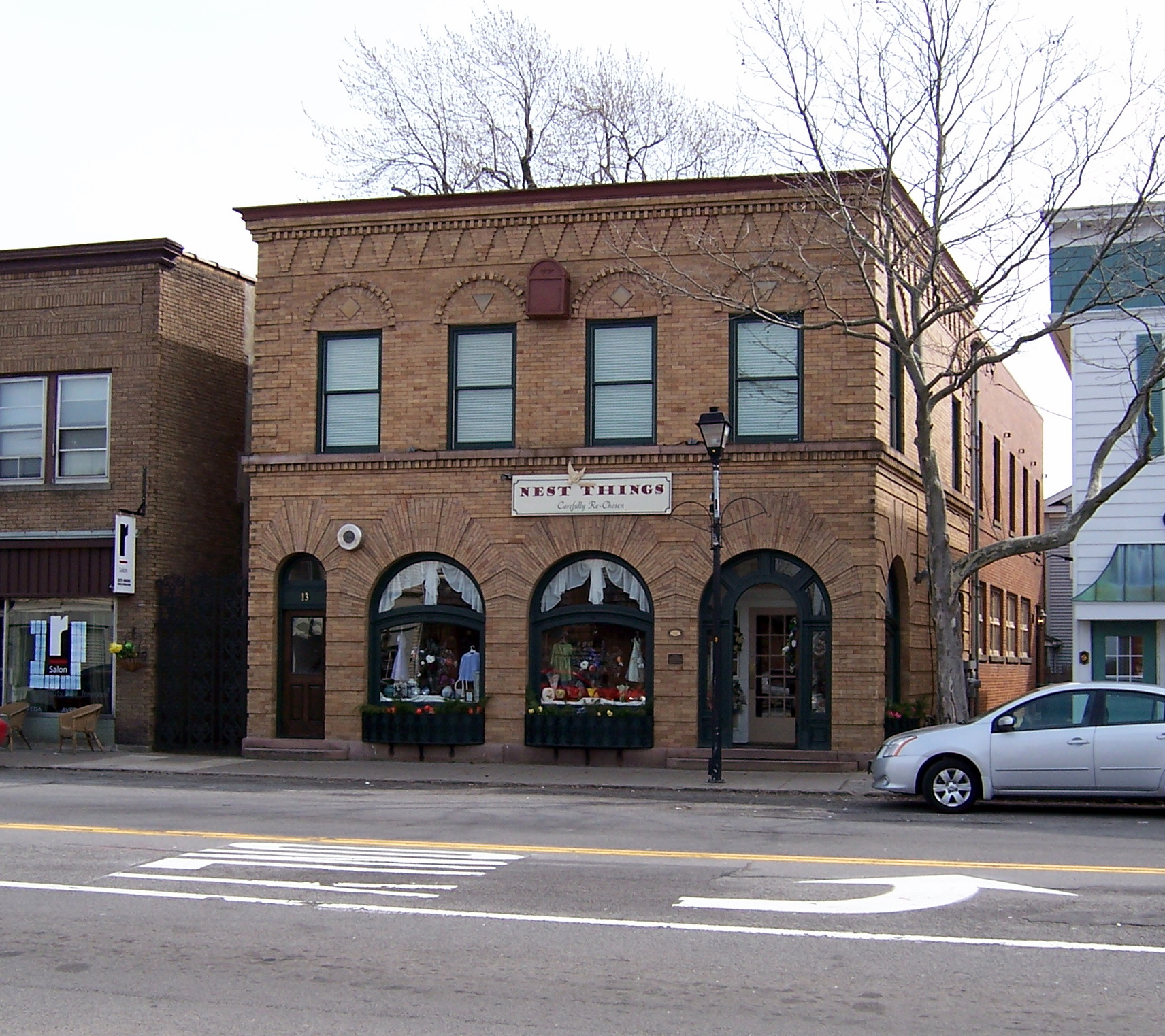
- Bank Building, April 2010

- Location within New York Location within the United States
- Location: 11 E. Main St., Webster, New York
- Coordinates: 43°12′50″N 77°25′47″W
- Area: less than one acre
- Built: 1906
- Architectural style: Beaux Arts
- NRHP reference No.: 06000970
- Added to NRHP: November 01, 2006

Jayne and Mason Bank Building is a historic bank building located at Webster in Monroe County, New York. It is a Beaux Arts style structure built in 1906 to house the Jayne and Mason Bank.

It was listed on the National Register of Historic Places in 2006. Joining it on the Register is the home of one of the bank's owners, the William C. Jayne House, located less than one half mile east.
