= Kinecta Federal Credit Union =

Credit union headquartered in California

- Type: Credit union
- Industry: Financial services
- Founded: 1940
- Headquarters: Manhattan Beach, California, United States
- Area served: California, New York
- Key people: Keith Sultemeier, President and CEO
- Total assets: $6.5B (2021)
- Number of employees: 800+
- Website: kinecta.org

Kinecta Federal Credit Union is a federally chartered credit union based in Manhattan Beach, California. Originally chartered in 1940, Kinecta has over 275,000 members and assets in excess of $6.5 billion (as of 2021). The credit union offers financial products and services for businesses and individuals, include checking and savings accounts; auto loans, RV and boat loans; credit cards; mortgage loans; home equity loans and lines of credit; business accounts, loans, and credit cards.

== History ==
Kinecta was originally known as the Hughes Aircraft Employees Federal Credit Union (HAEFCU). HAEFCU was formed in 1940 by twelve Hughes Aircraft engineers with total assets of $60. In 2001, HAEFCU changed its name to Kinecta Federal Credit Union after Raytheon Corporation's 1997 acquisition of Hughes Aircraft Company.

In April 2021 Kinecta and Xceed Financial Credit Union merged.

Tiger Federal Credit Union merged into Xerox Federal Credit Union in October 2007. Xerox Federal Credit Union was later renamed Xceed Financial Credit Union in 2008.

Tiger Federal Credit Union was founded in 1961 in Los Angeles to serve employees connected with the aviation legacy of the Flying Tigers, particularly those associated with The Flying Tiger Line cargo airline.

== Products and services ==
Kinecta provides products and services to individuals and businesses. For individual members, there are checking accounts, long or short-term savings options including CDs and IRAs; mortgage, auto, and equity loans; lines of credit for debt consolidation; and investment planning options.

== Locations ==
Kinecta has 23 branches in two states: California and New York.
