= Webster Central School District =

School district in New York, United States

Location
- 119 South Ave; Webster, NY 14580 Monroe County, New York United States
- Coordinates: 43.2082°N 77.4310°W

District information
- Type: Public
- Grades: Pre-K-12 and adult education
- Established: July 1948
- Superintendent: Brian Neenan
- Schools: Seven elementary schools (K–5); Two middle schools (6–8); Two senior high schools (9–12)
- Budget: ▲US$140.6 million (2011–2012)
- NCES District ID: 3630360

Students and staff
- Students: 8,806 (2011–2012)
- Teachers: 785 (2011–2012)
- Staff: 553 (2011–2012)

Other information
- Unions: NYSUT, Webster Teachers' Association
- Website: www.websterschools.org

The Webster Central School District is a public school district in New York State that serves approximately 8,800 students in the town and village of Webster and portions of Penfield in Monroe County and portions of Ontario and Walworth in Wayne County with about 1,350 employees and an operating budget of $140.6 million (~$15,964 per student).

The average class size is 20 for grades K–2, 21 for grades 3–5, and 26 for grades 6–8, and 25 for grades 9–12.

Brian Neenan is the Superintendent of Schools.

== Curriculum ==
Webster Central School District's curriculum includes an Advanced Placement program where students are offered a variety of courses for secondary students in which they may receive college credit. Students also have the option to enroll in numerous dual credit courses available through the district's partnership with Monroe Community College, the Rochester Institute of Technology and the College Level Examination Program (CLEP). These opportunities aim to allow students to save money in their future endeavors of pursuing higher level collegiate education.

Webster Central School District's students have the opportunity to enhance their learning through the 1:1 student device initiative, Transforming Learning Through Technology. Through this initiative, students have access to their own electronic device, either a Dell Chromebook or iPad. The district strives to combine technology savvy learning. The program also offers students the opportunity to work as customer service and technology repair representatives for their peers as part of the Webster Technical Internship program. Students may also receive certification from Dell as part of their training.

== Fine Arts ==
Beginning in kindergarten, students participate in an outstanding music and fine arts curriculum, optionally joining concert band beginning in third grade. The National Association of Music Merchants Foundation honors the Webster Central School District as one of the Best Communities for Music Education in the United States. Secondary-level students have the opportunity to perform in yearly theater productions as well.

== Athletics ==
Secondary-level student athletes may choose from a broad range of nearly 20 different interscholastic sports in which they may participate at the modified, junior varsity and varsity levels. Webster Central School District's varsity level student athletes regularly achieve New York State's Scholar Athlete recognition that requires a team GPA of 90% or higher. Student athletes participate in special presentations about social media use and drug abuse as well.

== Organization ==
The Board of Education (BOE) consists of 6 members who reside in the Webster School District. Members serve rotating 3-year terms. Elections are held each May for board members and to vote on the School District Budget.

Current board members are:

- Mike Suffoletto: President
- Sue Casey: Vice President
- Ann Carmody
- Linda Dioguardi
- Mike Dedee
- Tammy Gurowski
- Mike Gustin

Superintendents
Name	Tenure
Wallace W. Rayfield	1934 – December 31, 1949
Lester B. Foreman	January 1, 1950 –
Robert L. Thomas	– March 31, 1959
Herbert W. Schroeder	March 31, 1959 – 1969
Ross J. Willink	1969 – August 1981
Daniel J. McGuire	August 1981 - August 1987
K. Jack Syage	August 1987 - 1992
Philip A. Chirico	July 1992 - June 1994
Lawrence Pereira	August 1994 – July 1999
Thomas J. Strining	July 1999 – July 2006
Adele A. Bovard	July 2006 – July 31, 2014
Carmen Gumina	August 1, 2014 – April 29, 2021
Brian Neenan	April 29, 2021 – Present

== Schools ==
=== Primary schools ===
- DeWitt Road Elementary School, built in 1962, is a two-story elementary (K-5) school serving approximately 500 students. The school is back to back with the retired Bay Road School. The principal is Mark Schichtel.
- Klem North Elementary School, built in 1965, is a one-story elementary (K-5) building, across from Klem South Elementary School, that serves approximately 500 students. The principal is Laura Ballou.
- Klem South Elementary School, built in 1971, is a one-story elementary (K-5) building, across from Klem North Elementary School, that serves approximately 500 students. The principal is Martha End.
- Plank Road North Elementary School, built in 1959, is a one-story elementary (K-5) building composed of 3 wings, across from Plank Road South Elementary School, and serves approximately 500 students. The Principal is Craig Bodensteiner.
- Plank Road South Elementary School, built in 1970, is a one-story elementary (K-5) building, across from Plank Road North Elementary School, and serves approximately 500 students. The principal is Jill Doyle.
- Schlegel Road Elementary School, built in 1972, is a one-story elementary (K-5) building that offers 27 full-sized classrooms and serves approximately 500 students. The principal is Kate Hesla.
- State Road Elementary School, built in 1963, is a one-story elementary (K-5) building with two main wings that serve approximately 500 students. The principal is Christine Noeth-Abele.

=== Secondary schools ===
- Willink Middle School, the district's newest school (Built in 2001 and opened on September 7, 2001) is a 6-8 school serving approximately 1,000 students every day. The building is split up into three halls, or houses: Red, Green and Blue. The school offers cafeteria and gymnasium facilities. The principal is Brian Powers.
- Spry Middle School, located in the Village of Webster, serves approximately 1,000 students in the district's oldest building, originally built and opened in 1925 (dedicated on September 17, 1925) as Webster High School. It is split up into three houses: Red, White, and Blue. The principal is Christopher Callahan.
- Webster Thomas High School, located down the road from Willink Middle School, is a 9-12 school that has served approximately 2,069 students every day since its opening on September 5, 1962. The school features an auditorium and more recently constructed sports facilities. The school team is the Thomas Titans. The principal is Glenn Widor.
- Webster Schroeder High School was constructed in 1968 and serves approximately 2,000 students each day. With a new Aquatics Center, it is the district's largest building. The school team is the Webster Warriors. The principal is Paul Benz.
