= Webster Schroeder High School =

Location
- 875 Ridge Road; Webster, (Monroe County), New York 14580; United States
- Coordinates: 43.2037°N 77.4700°W

Information
- School type: Public school (government funded), high school
- Established: 1968
- Status: Currently Operational
- School district: Webster Central School District
- NCES District ID: 3630360
- Superintendent: Brian Neenan
- CEEB code: 335853
- NCES School ID: 363036004087
- Principal: Paul Benz
- Faculty: 107.73 (on an FTE basis)
- Grades: 9–12
- Gender: Coeducational
- Enrollment: 1286 (2021–2022 school year)
- Student to teacher ratio: 11.94
- Hours in school day: 7 Hours
- Campus: Suburb: Large
- Colors: Royal Blue and Notre Dame Gold
- Slogan: –
- Team name: Warriors

Webster Schroeder High School is a public high school located in Webster, Monroe County, New York, U.S.A., a suburb of Rochester, and is one of two high schools operated by the Webster Central School District.

== History ==
In Fall 1972, the school was split from the existing high school in the Webster Central School District. Originally named Herbert W. Schroeder High School, after Webster Schools Superintendent, 1959–1969. The first graduating class was in 1973. At that time the school mascot was the Schroeder Lion. In Fall 1984, the two high schools were reorganized as a junior and senior high school. In Fall 2002, they were again reorganized into two high schools, the other being Webster Thomas High School.

== Extracurricular activities ==
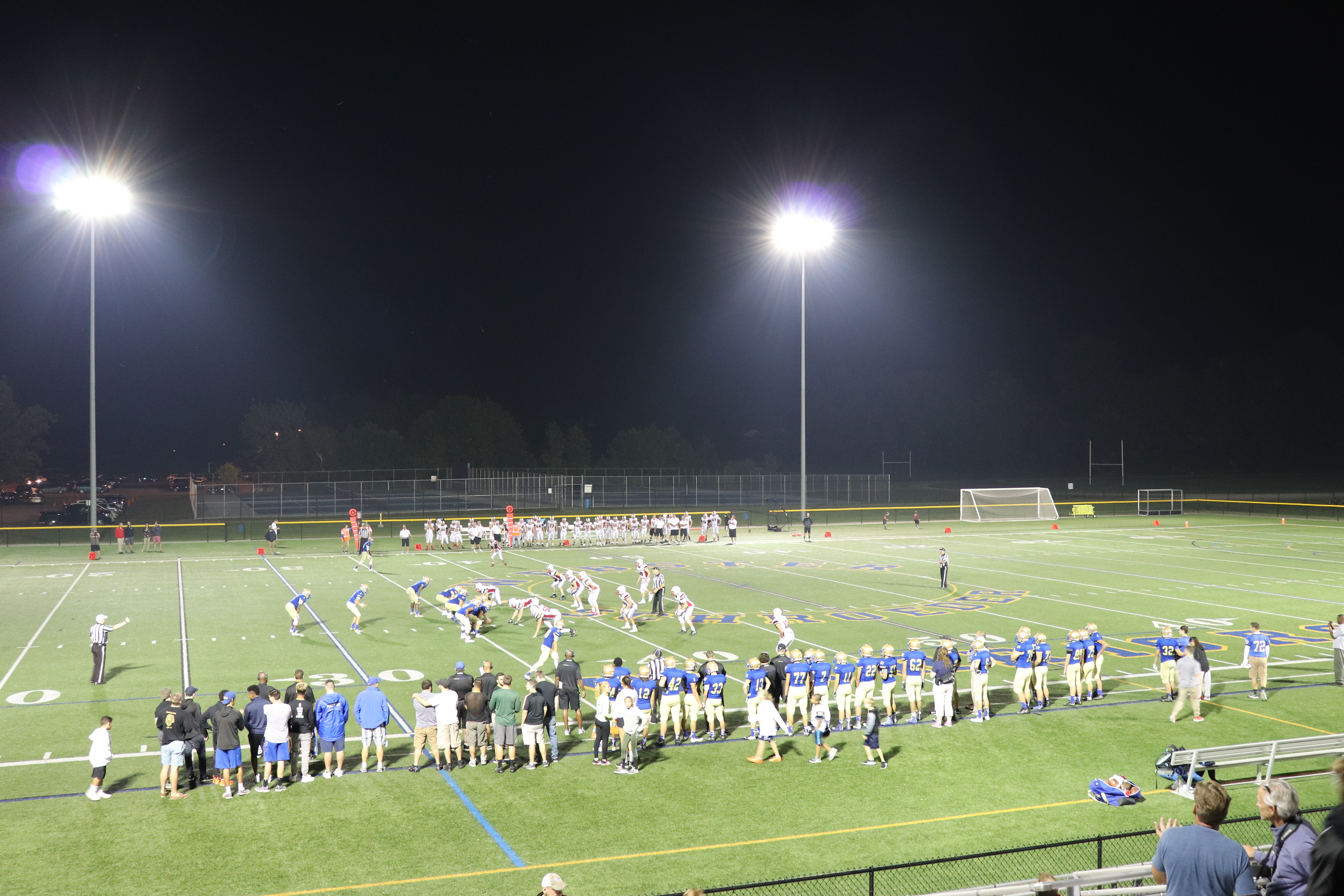
The Webster Warriors face off against the Hilton Cadets at Schroeder Stadium

The school's Science Olympiad team has existed since 2002 when it split from a joint team between Schroeder and Webster Thomas High School. Since then the team has participated in the state tournament multiple times, the highest award achieved was 6th place overall in New York state in 2004, 2014 and 2015.

The school's FIRST Robotics team was founded as a joint team with Webster Thomas High School, known as Team 1126 - SparX. The team qualified for participation in the FIRST Championship in 2003, 2004, 2005, 2006, 2007, 2008, 2010, 2012, 2014, and 2016.

== Notable alumni ==
- Susan Gibney, Class of 1979, television and motion picture actor
- Johnny Palermo, Class of 2000, television actor
- Gregor Gillespie, Class of 2005, 2x State Champion wrestler; professional Mixed Martial Artist in the UFC
- Chris Perfetti, Class of 2007, actor, notably in Crossbones, Looking, and Abbott Elementary
- Kate Lee Gurnow, Class of 2010, fiddler and singer, member of Grammy Award-winning group O'Connor Family Band
- Brian Bliss, Former footballer for the US National Team
- Grant Catalino, Professional lacrosse player for the Long Island Lizards
