= Grant Catalino =

American lacrosse player

Personal information
- Nationality: American
- Born: 03/07/1989
- Height: 6 ft 5 in (196 cm)
- Weight: 225 lb (102 kg; 16 st 1 lb)

Sport
- Position: Attack
- NLL draft: 49th overall, 2011; Rochester Knighthawks
- MLL team: Rochester Rattlers
- Pro career: 2011–

Grant Catalino is an American lacrosse player from Webster, New York. He is an attackman for the Long Island Lizards of Major League Lacrosse. He played college lacrosse for the University of Maryland Terrapins.

Catalino grew up in Webster, a suburb of Rochester, where he was a team captain for the Webster Schroeder High School Warriors for two years. In his senior year, the Democrat and Chronicle made him the first-ever All-Greater Rochester Player of the Year for boys' lacrosse.

At Maryland, where he majored in personal finance, he was a three-time All-American. He finished his college career with 119 goals (good for seventh all-time at Maryland) and 66 assists for 185 points (good for tenth all-time).

He was drafted 21st overall by the Denver Outlaws in the 2011 MLL Collegiate Draft, but he was quickly traded to his hometown Rochester Rattlers. He made his pro debut for the Rattlers after the Terrapins' season ended in the NCAA championship game. In his second professional game, he tied an MLL record by scoring nine goals in one game, a Rattlers loss to the Hamilton Nationals.

He was drafted in the sixth round of the 2011 NLL Entry Draft by his hometown Rochester Knighthawks.

Catalino is now retired from pro lacrosse and is the founder/director of Harvest Lacrosse.
