= William C. Jayne House =

Historic house in New York, United States

- U.S. National Register of Historic Places
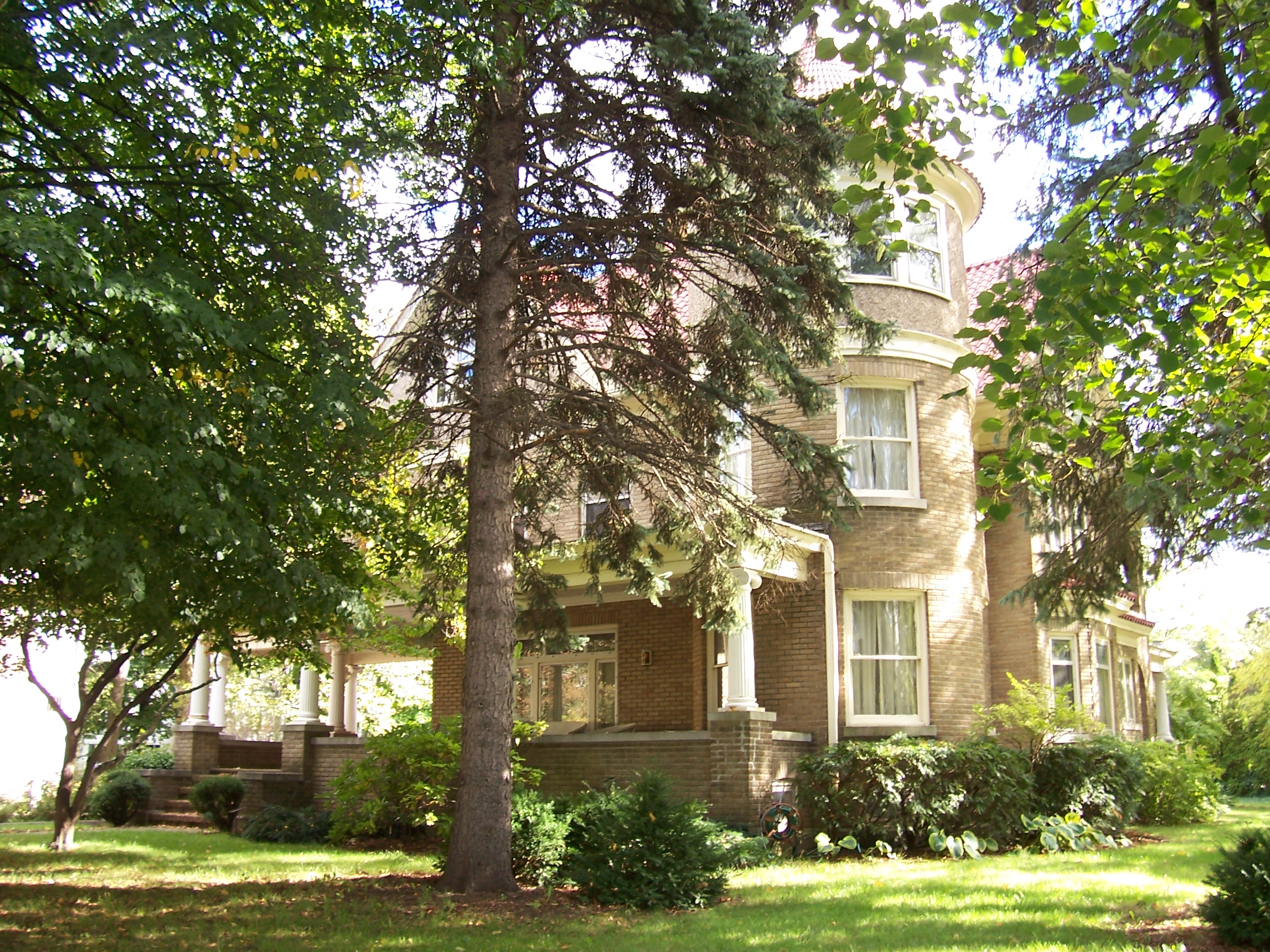
- William C. Jayne House, September 2012

- Location within New York Location within the United States
- Location: 183 E. Main St., Webster, New York
- Coordinates: 43°12′53″N 77°25′23″W
- Area: 0.6 acres (0.24 ha)
- Architect: Sharp, W.F.
- Architectural style: Queen Anne, Colonial Revival
- NRHP reference No.: 06000891
- Added to NRHP: September 28, 2006

William C. Jayne House is a historic home located at Webster in Monroe County, New York. The principal building is a large 2 1/2-story house that combines simple Queen Anne style massing and Colonial Revival style decorative features. It was built in 1917–1918, and incorporates high quality construction materials including narrow Roman brick, cast stone, stucco and wood detailing, and ceramic roof tiles.

It was listed on the National Register of Historic Places in 2006. Joining it on the Register is the Jayne and Mason Bank Building, once home to a bank co-owned by William C. Jayne, and located less than one half mile west.

== Gallery ==
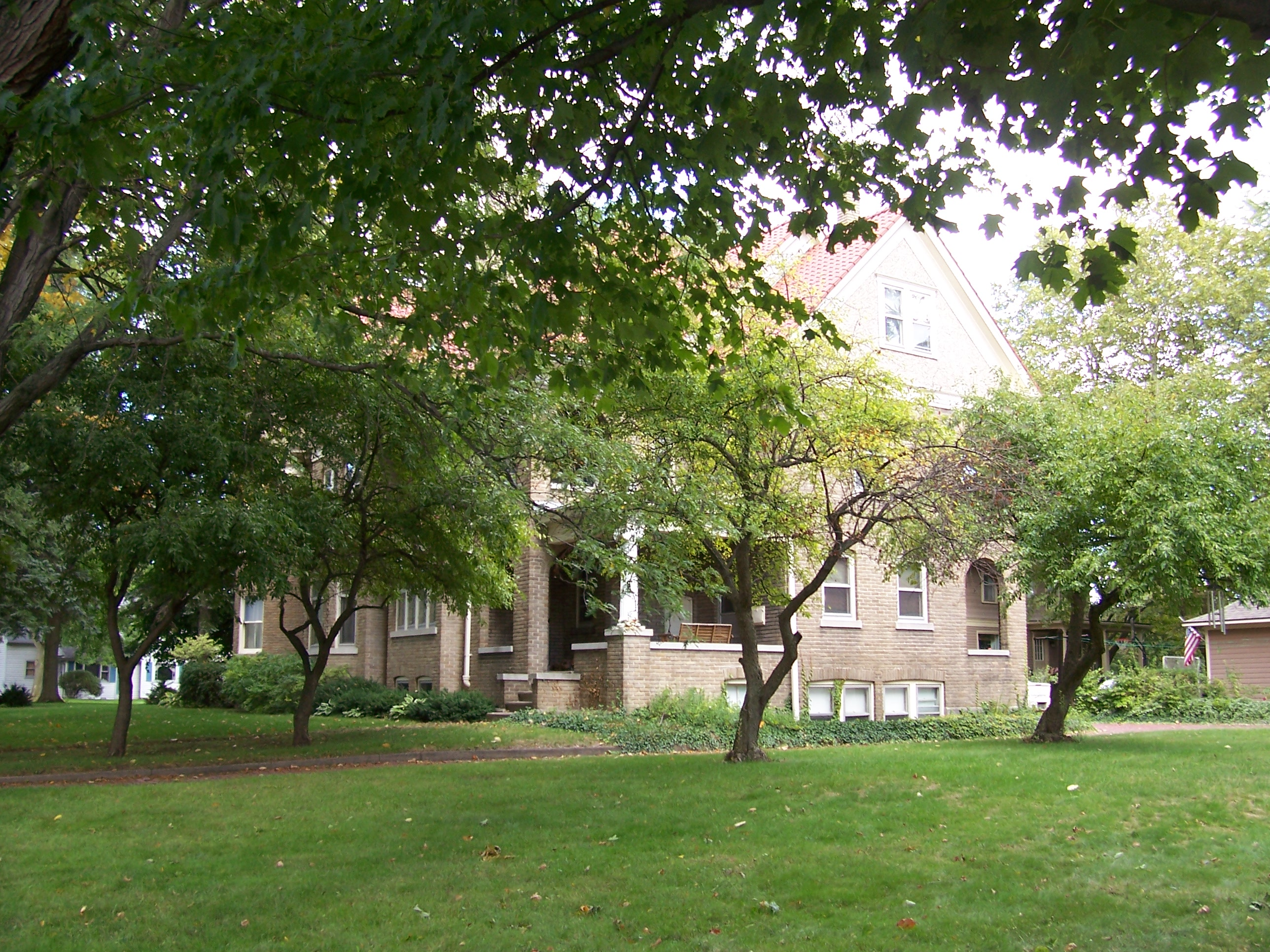

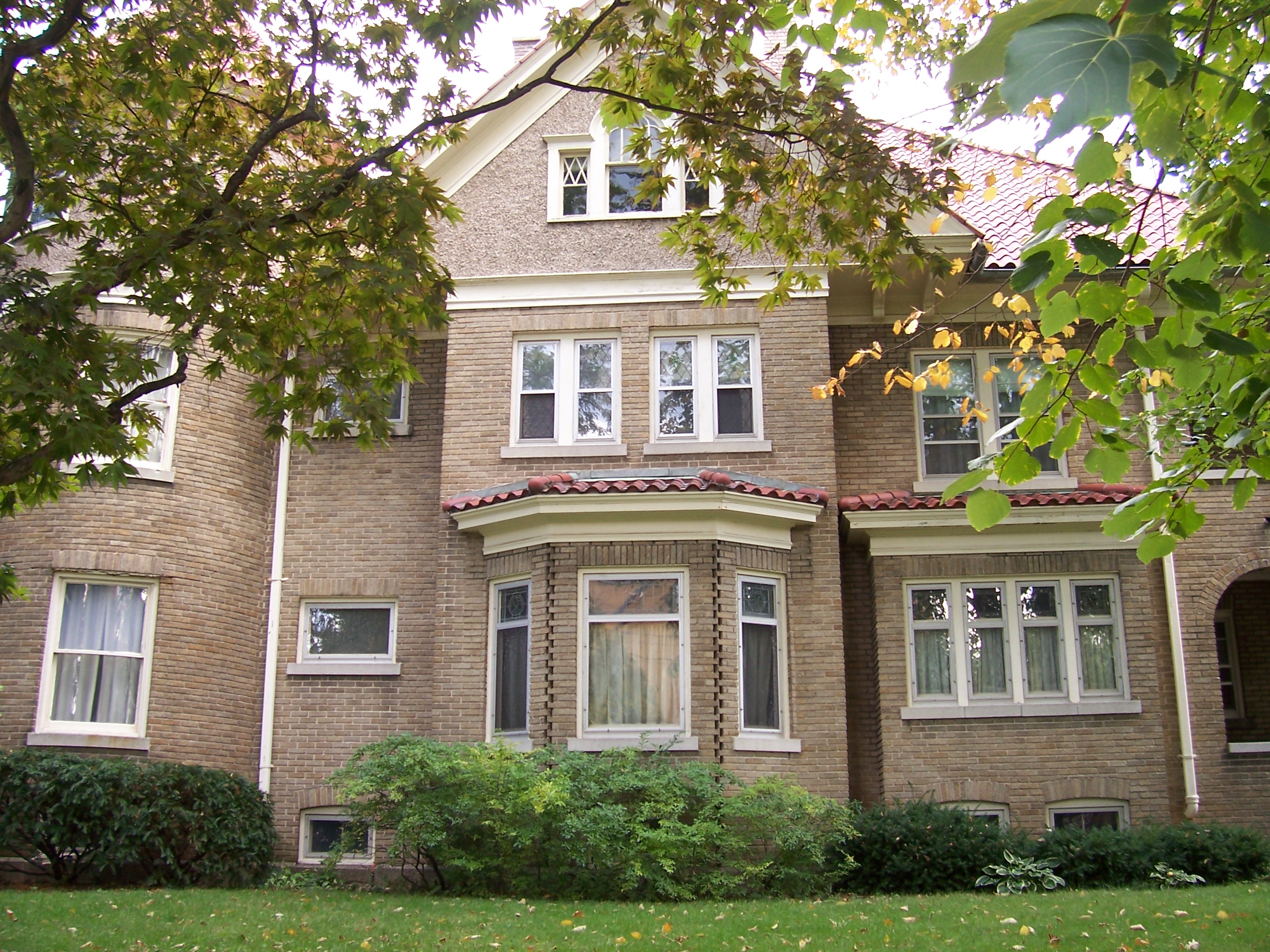
