= Mason–Watkins House =

Historic house in New Hampshire, United States

- U.S. National Register of Historic Places
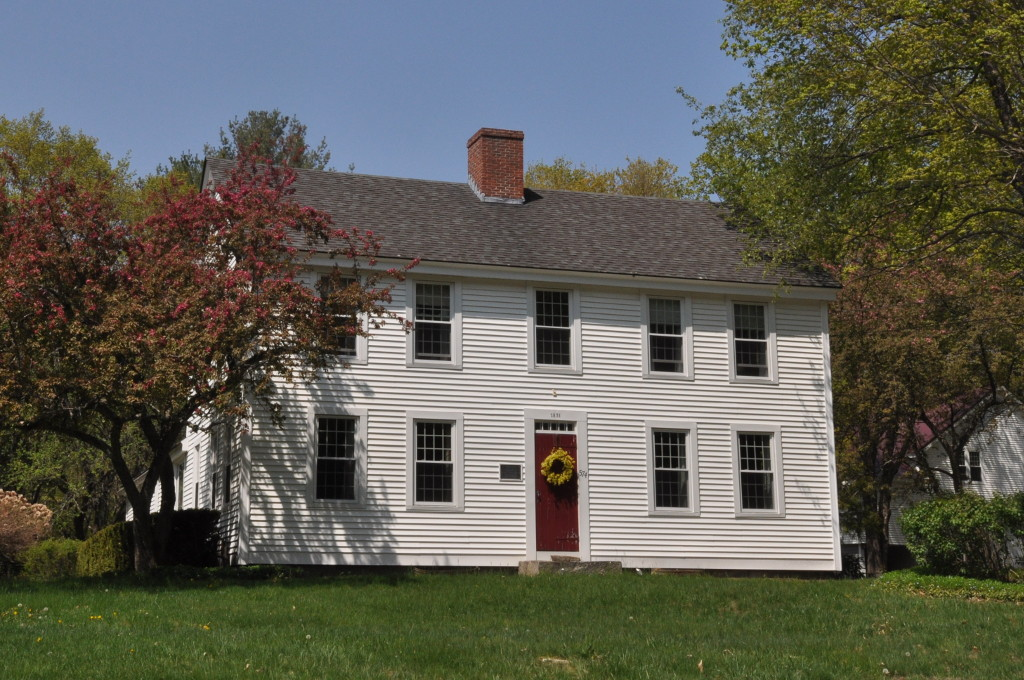

- Location within New Hampshire Location within the United States
- Location: Old Walpole and Mine Ledge Rds., Surry, New Hampshire
- Coordinates: 42°59′12″N 72°20′18″W
- Area: 9 acres (3.6 ha)
- Built: 1832
- Architectural style: Federal
- NRHP reference No.: 82001670
- Added to NRHP: March 11, 1982

The Mason–Watkins House is a historic house at the northwest corner of Old Walpole Road and Mine Ledge Road (RD #2, Box #316) in Surry, New Hampshire. Built in 1832, it is an example of the conservative persistence of Federal style architecture well after the Greek Revival had become popular in other parts of New England. The house was listed on the National Register of Historic Places in 1982.

== Description and history ==
The Mason–Watkins House is located in a rural setting in southwestern Surry, at the northwest corner of Old Walpole and Mine Ledge Roads. It is a 2 1/2-story wood-frame structure, with a gabled roof and clapboarded exterior. It is five bays wide, with a central chimney, and simple window casings. Windows are arranged symmetrically around the center entrance, which is topped by a four-light transom window. A single-story ell extends to the rear, terminating in a former carriage house converted to garage. The interior has a typical Colonial central chimney plan, with a narrow vestibule that includes a tight triple-run staircase, with the parlor and dining room flanking the chimney. The fireplace surrounds in these two rooms are original, exhibiting Federal period styling.

The house was built in 1832 by an unknown builder. The interior woodwork drawing inspiration from Asher Benjamin's 1806 American Builder's Companion, an indication of the conservative style the house exhibits. By the 1830s, much of New Hampshire had already begun adopting the Greek Revival style in housing construction, and this house is a clear throwback to the earlier Federal period.

== See also ==
- National Register of Historic Places listings in Cheshire County, New Hampshire
