= Webster Baptist Church (Webster, New York) =

Historic church in New York, United States

- U.S. National Register of Historic Places
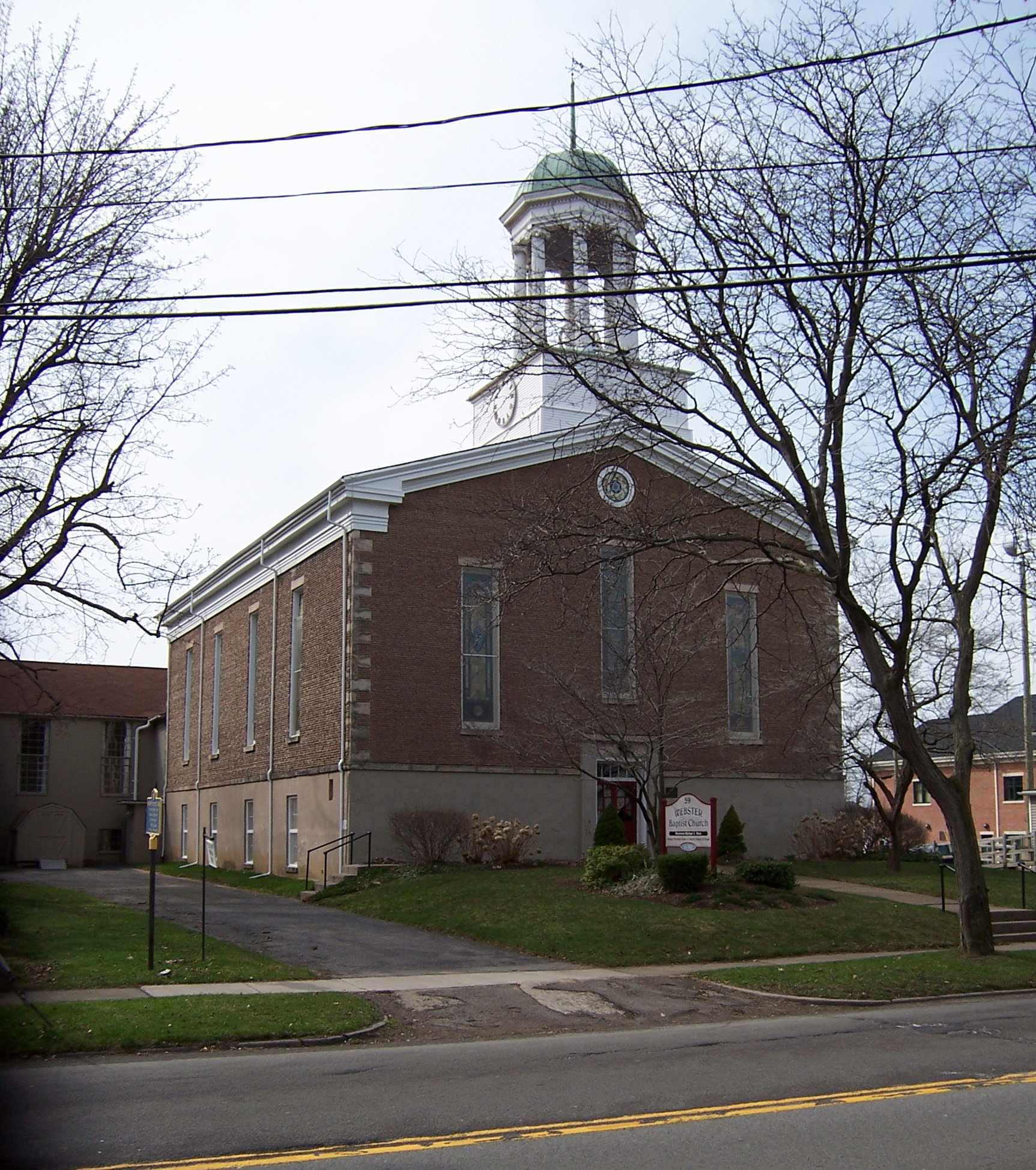
- Webster Baptist Church, April 2010

- Location within New York Location within the United States
- Location: 59 South Avenue, Webster, New York
- Coordinates: 43°12′38″N 77°25′52″W
- Area: 0.3 acres (0.12 ha)
- Built: 1856
- Architectural style: Greek Revival
- NRHP reference No.: 91001672
- Added to NRHP: November 07, 1991

Webster Baptist Church is a historic Baptist church located at Webster in Monroe County, New York. It is a large Greek Revival style cobblestone church building built in 1856. The building features an octagonal open domed belfry supported by eight Ionic columns. It has a veneer of small, rounded and uniform lake-washed cobbles. It is one of only 14 cobblestone church buildings in New York state, and of 106 cobblestone structures in Monroe County. The building was fully renovated in 1965.

It was listed on the National Register of Historic Places in 1991.
