= W. A. Mason House =

Historic house in Massachusetts, United States

- U.S. National Register of Historic Places
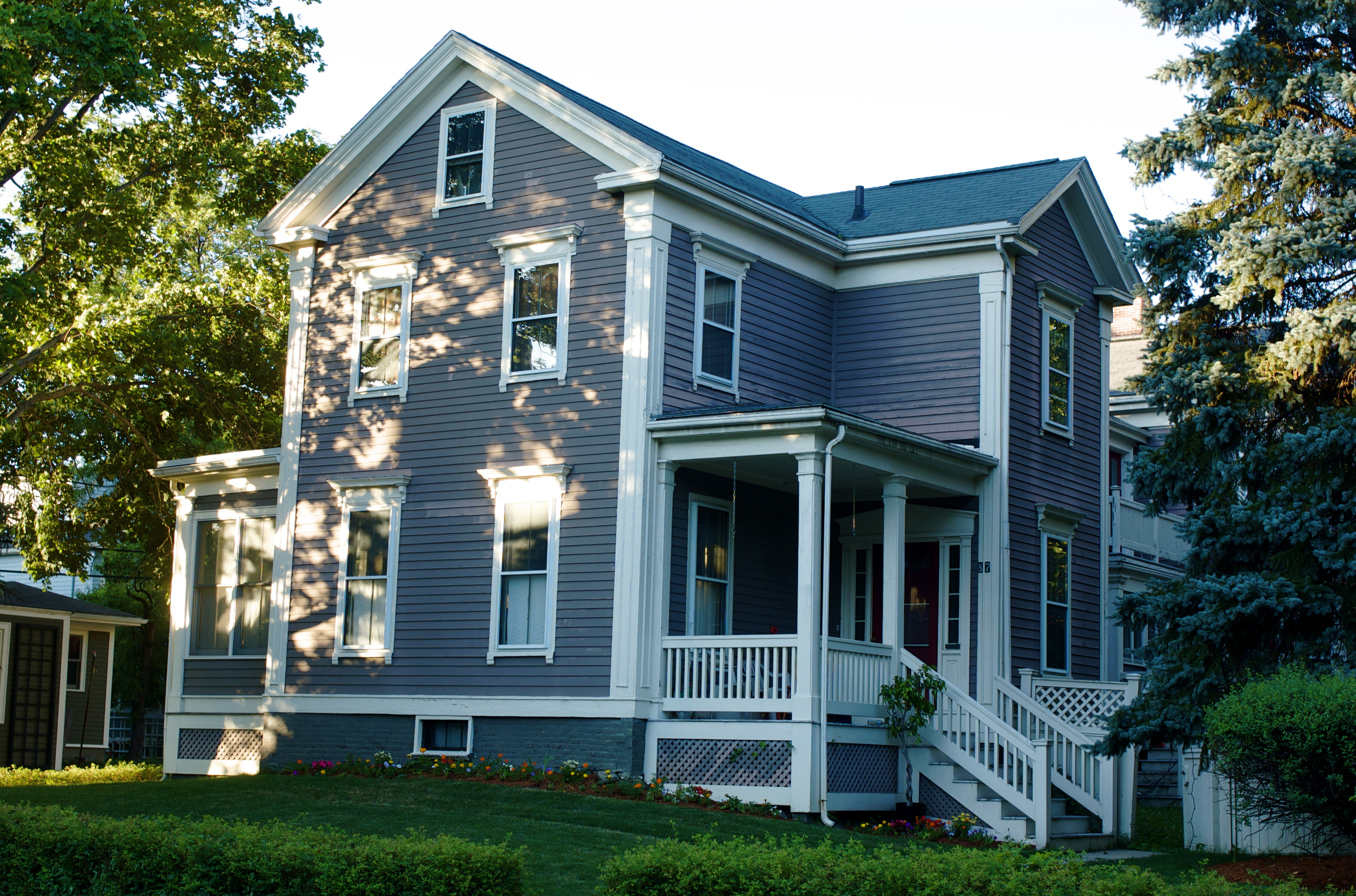

- Location within Massachusetts Location within the United States
- Location: Cambridge, Massachusetts
- Coordinates: 42°23′9″N 71°7′35″W
- Area: less than one acre
- Built: 1846
- Architectural style: Greek Revival, Italianate
- MPS: Cambridge MRA
- NRHP reference No.: 83000817
- Added to NRHP: June 30, 1983

The W. A. Mason House is an historic house at 87 Raymond Street in Cambridge, Massachusetts. The 2 1/2-story wood-frame house was built in 1846 and extended to the rear in 1867, giving it a T shape. Its massing is Italianate as are its decorative window hoods, but its corner pilasters give it a Greek Revival character. The main entrance is accessed through a single-story porch occupying the front crook of the T. W. A. Mason, for whom it was built, was a city surveyor who was responsible for surveying and platting a significant amount of the city in the 19th century.

The house was listed on the National Register of Historic Places in 1983.

== See also ==
- National Register of Historic Places listings in Cambridge, Massachusetts
