= Webster Thomas High School =

Location
- 800 Five Mile Line Rd; Webster, (Monroe County), New York 14580; United States; 43.2200°N 77.4724°W

Information
- School type: Public school (government funded), high school
- School district: Webster Central School District
- NCES District ID: 3630360
- Superintendent: Brian Neenan
- CEEB code: 335859
- NCES School ID: 363036004865
- Principal: Glenn Widor
- Faculty: 99.26 (on an FTE basis)
- Grades: 9–12
- Gender: Coeducational
- Enrollment: 1,321 (2018-2019 school year)
  - Other: 14
- Student to teacher ratio: 14.69
- Campus: Suburb: Large
- Colors: Navy, White and Yellow
- Mascot: Titans
- Feeder schools: Willink Middle School
- Affiliations: Monroe Community College, Rochester Institute of Technology

The Webster Thomas High School is a public high school located in the town of Webster, Monroe County, New York, U.S.A., and is one of two New York high schools operated by the Webster Central School District.

== Sean Kingston Visit ==
On Wednesday, Dec. 12, 2007, Sean Kingston performed a 20-minute concert for students followed by a question-and-answer session.

== Extracurricular Activities ==
The school's FIRST Robotics team was founded as a joint team with Webster Schroeder High School, known as Team 1126 - SparX. The team qualified for participation in the FIRST Championship in 2003, 2004, 2005, 2006, 2007, 2008, 2010, 2012, 2014, and 2016.
