= George G. Mason House =

Historic house in New York, United States

- U.S. National Register of Historic Places
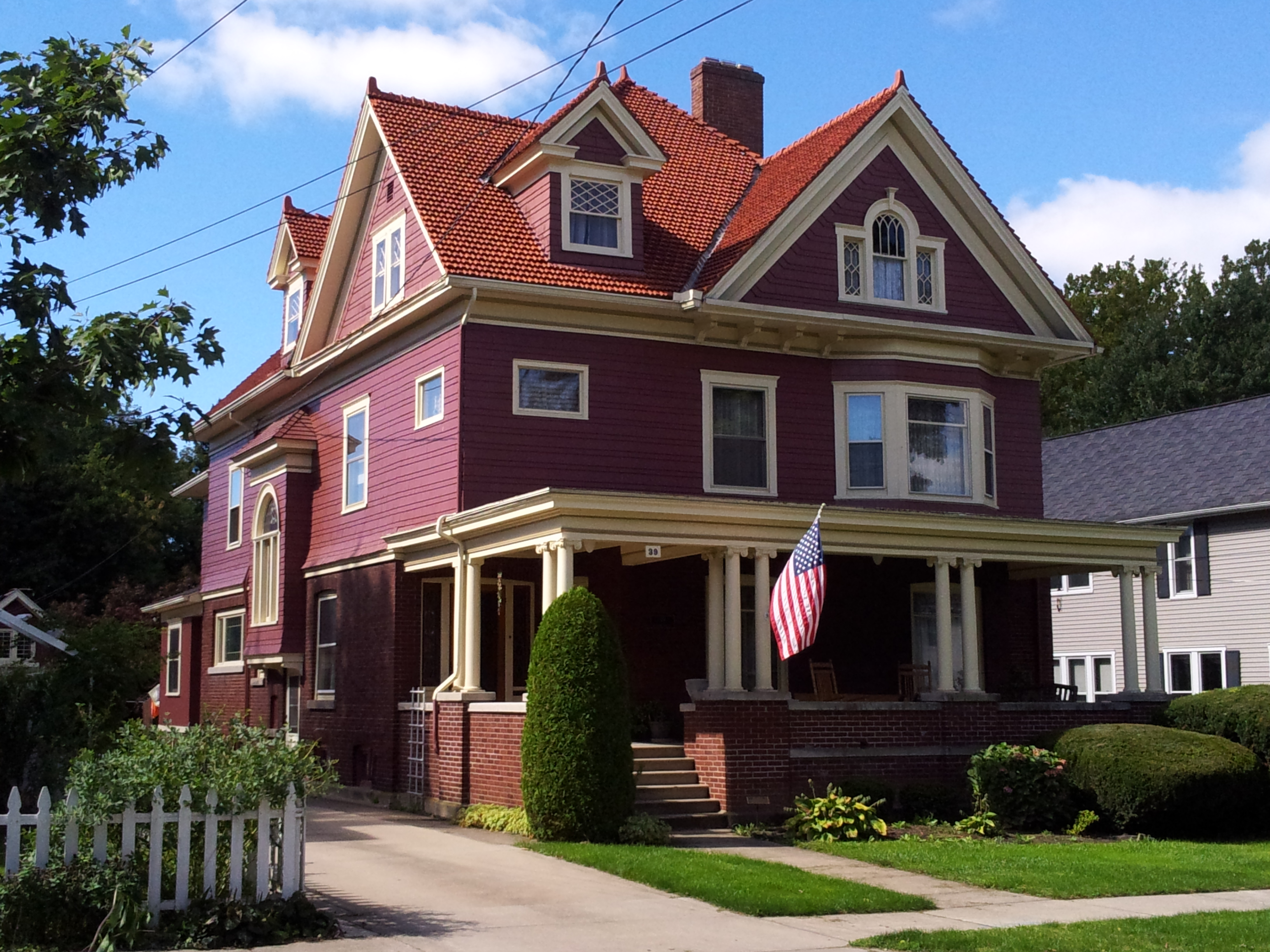

- Location within New York Location within the United States
- Location: 39 Dunning Ave., Webster, New York
- Coordinates: 43°12′49″N 77°25′34″W
- Area: 0.3 acres (0.12 ha)
- Built: 1910
- Architectural style: Queen Anne, Classical Revival
- NRHP reference No.: 04001206
- Added to NRHP: October 27, 2004

George G. Mason House is a historic home located at Webster in Monroe County, New York. The building was constructed in 1910 and is a large 2 1/2-story house that combines simple Queen Anne style massing and Colonial Revival style decorative features. The first floor is built of brick and above the house is sheathed in shingles. Prominent exterior features include the use of bay windows, a projected stair landing on the south elevation, and paired Corinthian porch columns supported on engaged piers in the balustrade.

It was listed on the National Register of Historic Places in 2004.
