= New York State Route 404 =

State highway in Monroe County, New York, US

New York State Route 404

- Map of Rochester with NY 404 highlighted in red

Route information
- Maintained by NYSDOT
- Length: 10.05 mi (16.17 km)
- Existed: c. 1971–present
- Tourist routes: Great Lakes Seaway Trail

Major junctions
- West end: NY 590 in Irondequoit
- East end: NY 104 in Webster

Location
- Country: United States
- State: New York
- Counties: Monroe

Highway system
- New York Highways; Interstate; US; State; Reference; Parkways
← NY 403	→ NY 405

New York State Route 404 (NY 404) is an east–west state highway located in eastern Monroe County, New York, in the United States. It extends for just over 10 miles (16 km) from an interchange with NY 590 in Irondequoit to an intersection with NY 104 on the Monroe–Wayne County line in the town of Webster. The route traverses the southern tip of Irondequoit Bay and passes through the village of Webster, where NY 404 intersects NY 250. Most of NY 404 passes through commercial areas; however, the western and eastern extents of the highway serve areas more residential in nature. The westernmost 3 miles (5 km) of the route is part of the Seaway Trail, a National Scenic Byway.

NY 404 largely follows the path of the Theodore Roosevelt International Highway, an early 20th-century auto trail, through the towns of Irondequoit, Penfield, and Webster. Most of modern NY 404 was designated as NY 3 in 1924 and redesignated as U.S. Route 104 (US 104) c. 1935. In the early 1970s, US 104 was realigned to follow a new freeway between Irondequoit and Five Mile Line Road in Webster while NY 404 was assigned to US 104's former surface routing along the southern and eastern extents of Irondequoit Bay. NY 404 was gradually extended eastward to the Wayne County line over the course of the next decade as more sections of the freeway opened to traffic.

== Route description ==
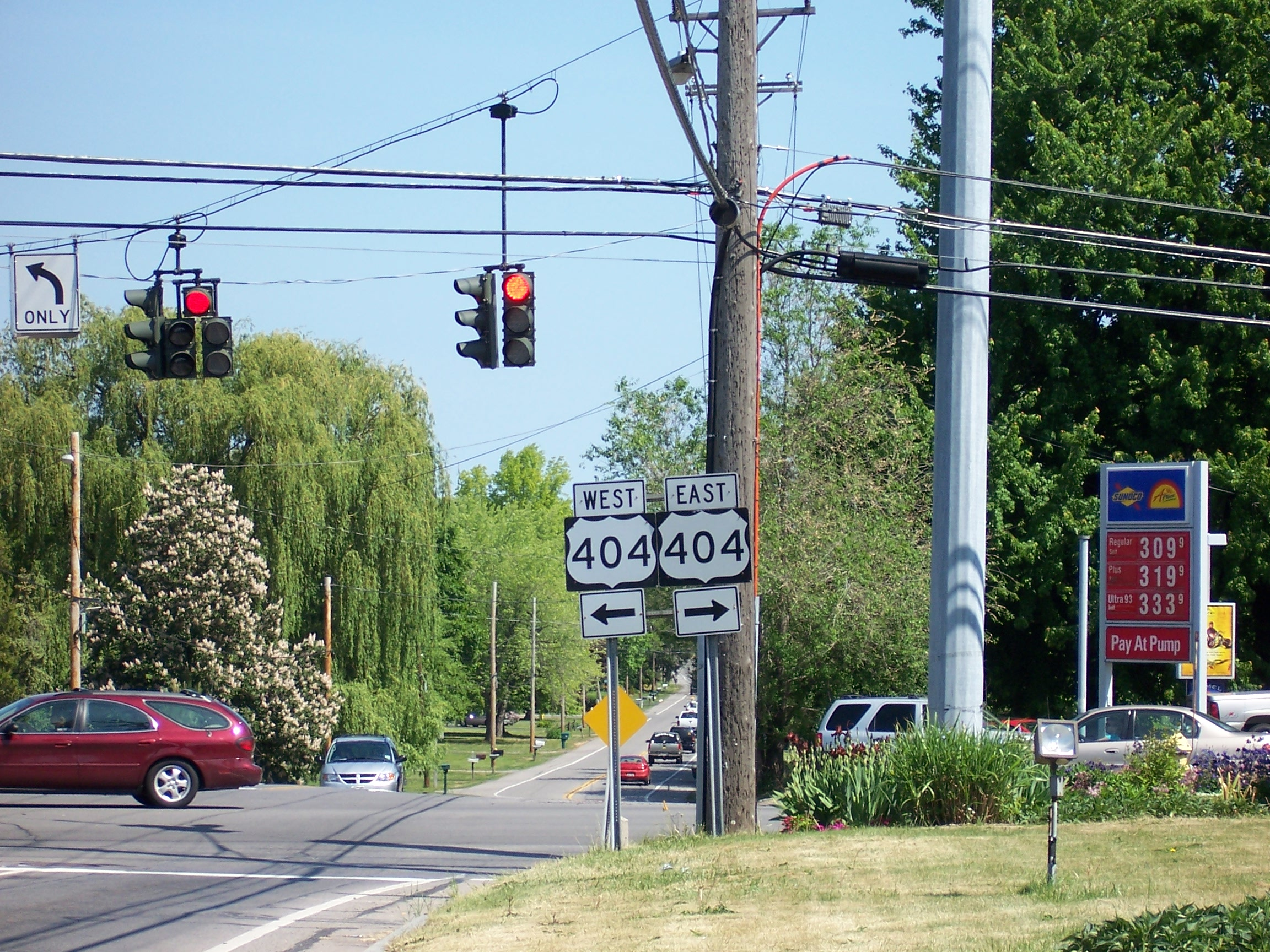
Sign assembly for NY 404 using U.S. Route shields instead of state highway shields.

NY 404 begins at NY 590 exit 8 in Irondequoit as Empire Boulevard, although the 0.71-mile (1.14 km) portion of Empire Boulevard between NY 590 and the Rochester city line is also state maintained as NY 941B, an unsigned reference route. Irondequoit Bay is northeast of this intersection, and Empire Boulevard serves as the northernmost non-bridge route from one side of the bay to the other; that is, between the inner-ring suburbs of Irondequoit and Brighton and the outer-ring suburbs of Webster and Penfield. The four-lane Empire Boulevard heads east from NY 590, intersecting North Winton Road (former NY 47) in a residential neighborhood before descending into a valley surrounding the bay. NY 404 continues east across the base of the valley, crossing the southern tip of the bay at the Irondequoit–Penfield town line.

At the eastern edge of the bay valley, the route begins to turn to the northeast, slowly ascending in elevation as it heads away from Irondequoit Bay. The terrain levels off at the top of the valley, where NY 404 enters a major commercial strip that follows the route for 2 miles (3.2 km) into the adjacent town of Webster. This strip is largely based around NY 404's junction with Bay Road, a north–south highway connecting NY 404 to Lake Road. The segment of Empire Boulevard between Culver Road (located just west of the Rochester city line) and Bay Road is part of the Seaway Trail, a National Scenic Byway. NY 404 continues into Webster, where it narrows to two lanes ahead of an intersection with Ridge Road in the Webster hamlet of West Webster. The route merges with Ridge Road, taking on that name as it heads east toward the village of Webster.

From West Webster to the village of Webster, a distance of 2.5 miles (4.0 km), NY 404 runs along the edge of a small ridge as it passes through a commercial corridor anchored by a series of shopping plazas at the base of the hill. The commercial surroundings continue into the village, where NY 404 becomes West Main Street. It changes names to East Main Street upon intersecting NY 250 in Webster's central business district, but the Ridge Road name returns east of the Webster village limits. NY 404 continues on, passing through a residential area of the town as it approaches the Monroe–Wayne County line. Roughly a half-mile (0.8 km) before the county line, NY 404 turns north onto Ridge Road Junction, a road that heads northeast down the edge of the ridge that gives Ridge Road its name. Upon reaching the base of the hill, NY 404 merges with County Line Road for a short distance to reach an intersection with NY 104, where NY 404 terminates.

== History ==
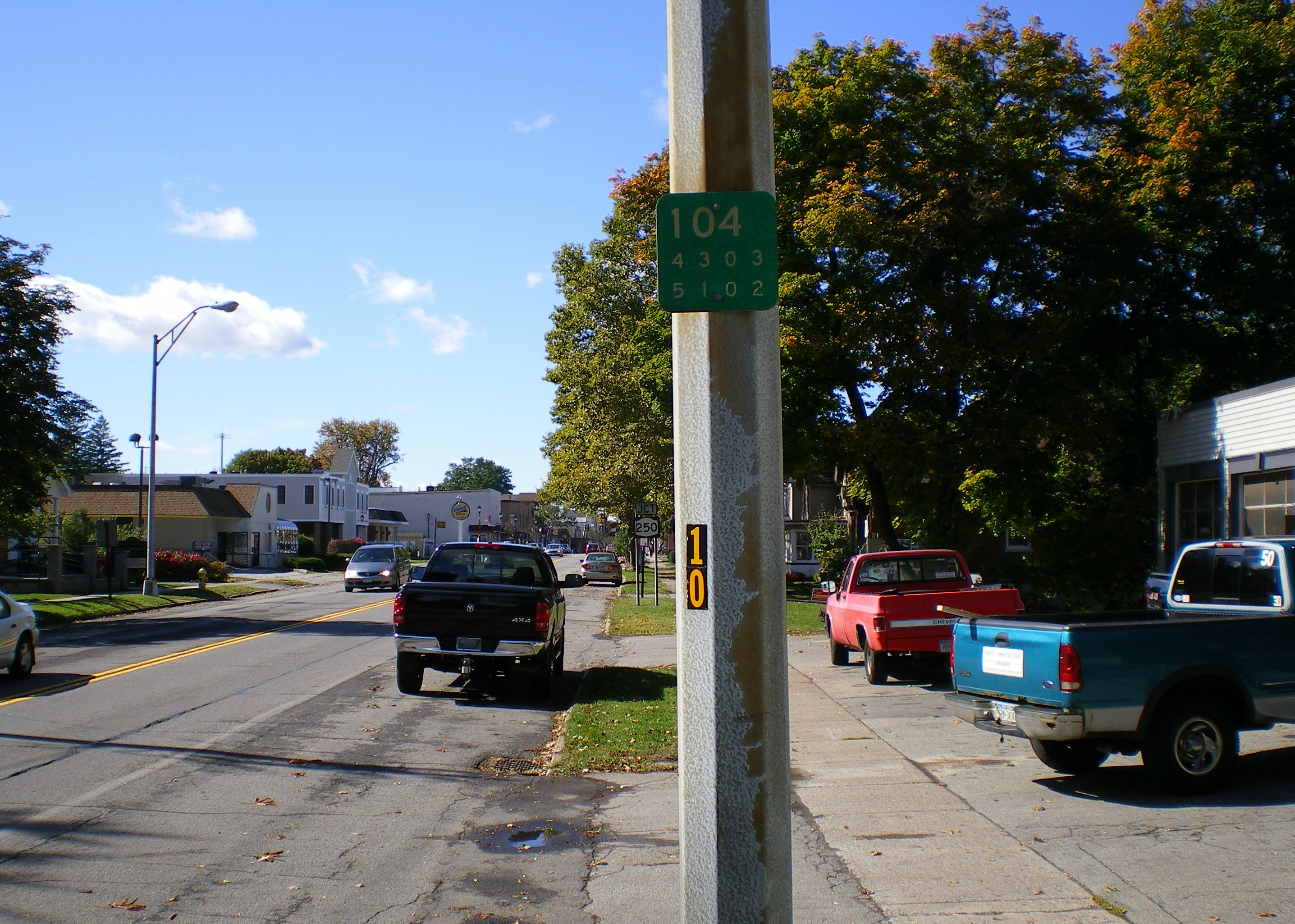
Reference marker for NY 104 on NY 404 in Webster. NY 404 is the former alignment of NY 104 through eastern Monroe County.

In 1908, the New York State Legislature created Route 30, an unsigned legislative route extending from Niagara Falls to Rouses Point via Rochester and Maple View. Route 30 exited Rochester on Empire Boulevard and followed it northeastward around Irondequoit Bay to where it merged with Ridge Road west of Webster. The route continued eastward on Ridge Road through Webster and into Wayne County. When the first set of posted routes in New York were assigned in 1924, most of legislative Route 30 in northeastern Monroe County became part of NY 3, a cross-state highway that extended from the Niagara Frontier to the North Country and passed through downtown Rochester. In eastern Monroe County, NY 3 originally followed the path of legislative Route 30 from Rochester to the county line. This section of NY 3 was also part of the Theodore Roosevelt International Highway, an international auto trail.

By 1930, NY 3 was realigned through Rochester to exit the city on North Winton Road. It rejoined its previous alignment at the junction of North Winton Road and Empire Boulevard. The designation remained in place until c. 1935 when NY 3 was supplanted east of Rochester by US 104, a new highway assigned to the length of Ridge Road between Lewiston and Oswego. In the eastern suburbs of Rochester, US 104 initially followed what had been NY 3—namely Winton Road, Empire Boulevard, and Ridge Road. US 104 was realigned c. 1937 to follow Ridge and Culver Roads through Irondequoit, bypassing downtown entirely. US 104 turned east at the junction of Culver Road and Empire Boulevard, following the latter to Winton Road.

The current super two highway paralleling Ridge Road between the Wayne County line and Sodus was built in the mid-1940s. Also constructed at this time was a short connector named Ridge Road Junction, which carried US 104 between the west end of the super two and Ridge Road just west of the Wayne County line. US 104 was realigned in the late 1950s to follow a new section of the Sea Breeze Expressway between Ridge Road and Empire Boulevard. The route was altered again c. 1971 to follow a newly built expressway between NY 47 (now NY 590) in Irondequoit and Five Mile Line Road in Webster. The former alignment of US 104 from NY 47 around the southern tip of Irondequoit Bay to Five Mile Line Road was redesignated as NY 404. The designation of NY 447 was also proposed for this alignment, but Webster and Irondequoit chose NY 404.

In the mid-1970s, NY 404 was extended eastward to NY 250 in the village of Webster, replacing then-NY 104, which had been moved onto a pair of highways between Five Mile Line Road and NY 250 that eventually became the freeway's frontage roads. The section from NY 250 to the existing expressway at the Wayne County line was built in the late 1970s while the main carriageway of NY 104 between Five Mile Line Road and NY 250 was completed in the early 1980s. NY 404 was extended east along the former alignment of NY 104 to the county line upon the total completion of the Five Mile Line Road–NY 250 segment.

== Major intersections ==
The entire route is in Monroe County.

Location	mi	km	Destinations	Notes
Irondequoit	0.00	0.00	Empire Boulevard / Great Lakes Seaway Trail (NY 941B west)	Continuation west; former US 104
Irondequoit	0.00	0.00	NY 590	Exit 8 on NY 590
Irondequoit	2.7	4.3	Bay Road / Creek Street / Great Lakes Seaway Trail	
Village of Webster	7.07	11.38	NY 250	
Town of Webster	10.05	16.17	NY 104	Eastern terminus
1.000 mi = 1.609 km; 1.000 km = 0.621 mi
