= Mason House (Bradford, Arkansas) =

Historic house in Arkansas, United States

- U.S. National Register of Historic Places
- Location within Arkansas Location within the United States
- Location: W. Main St. W of jct. with Walnut St., Bradford, Arkansas
- Coordinates: 35°25′30″N 91°27′37″W
- Area: less than one acre
- Built: 1935
- Architectural style: Bungalow/craftsman
- MPS: White County MPS
- NRHP reference No.: 91001319
- Added to NRHP: July 20, 1992

The Mason House was a historic house on West Main Street in Bradford, Arkansas. It was a single story wood-frame structure, with a front-facing gabled roof, weatherboard siding, and a concrete foundation. A flat-roof porch extended across the front and around part of one side, supported by round columns. Built in 1935, it was Bradford's best example of vernacular Craftsman architecture.

The house was listed on the National Register of Historic Places in 1992. It has been listed as destroyed in the Arkansas Historic Preservation Program database.

== See also ==
- National Register of Historic Places listings in White County, Arkansas
