= Mason House (Dublin, New Hampshire) =

Historic house in New Hampshire, United States

- U.S. National Register of Historic Places
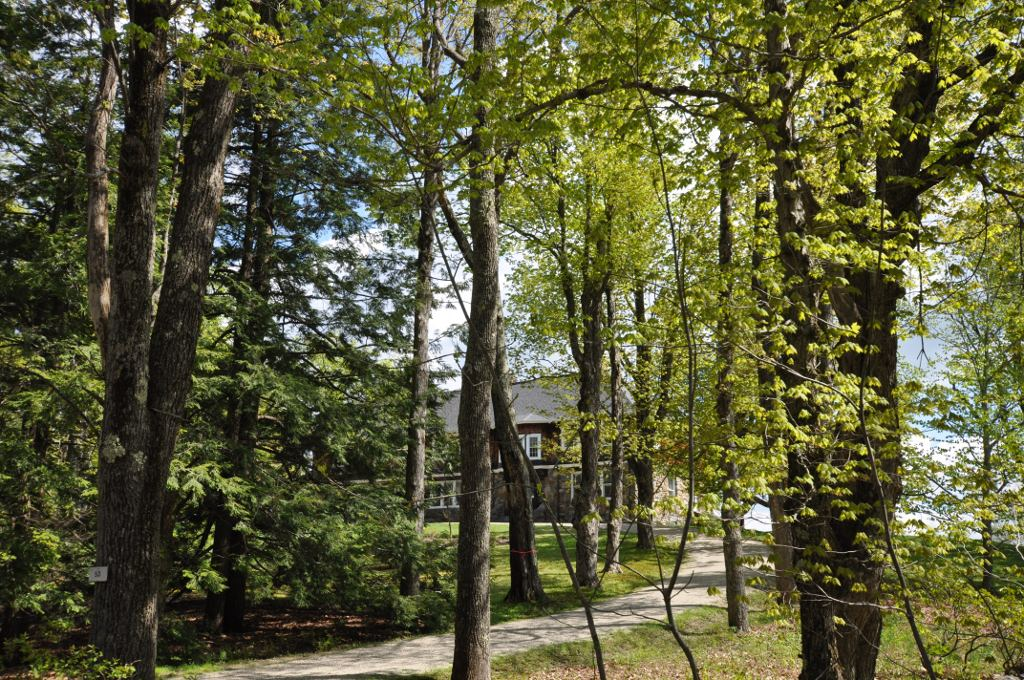

- Location within New Hampshire Location within the United States
- Location: Snow Hill Rd., Dublin, New Hampshire
- Coordinates: 42°54′6″N 72°3′57″W
- Area: 2 acres (0.81 ha)
- Built: 1888
- Built by: A.L. Ball
- Architect: Alexander Wadsworth Longfellow
- Architectural style: Georgian Revival
- MPS: Dublin MRA
- NRHP reference No.: 83004049
- Added to NRHP: December 15, 1983

The Mason House is a historic house on Snow Hill Road in Dublin, New Hampshire. Built in 1888, it is a fine example of Shingle style architecture, with elements of the Richardsonian Romanesque inspired by architect Alexander Wadsworth Longfellow's mentor H. H. Richardson. The house was listed on the National Register of Historic Places in 1983.

== Description and history ==
The Mason House is located in central Dublin, on the east side of Snow Hill Road, about 0.2 miles (0.32 km) south of New Hampshire Route 101. It is situated on a ridge overlooking the Peterborough hills. It is a two-story structure, with a rough stone first floor and a shingled timber-frame second story. It is capped by a hip roof, and features groupings of sash windows along its walls.

The house was designed by Alexander Wadsworth Longfellow and built in 1888. Originally a summer house three stories in height, this Shingle style house was reduced to two stories in 1950 when it was prepared for year-round occupancy. Its style is reminiscent of early work of H. H. Richardson, in whose firm Longfellow served as a draftsman. The house was built for a pair of spinster sisters, Ella and Ida Mason, who were friends of Raphael Pumpelly, whose summer estate was nearby. The house was occupied in 1910 by James Bryce, then the UK Ambassador to the United States, and was informally dubbed the "British Summer Embassy". It was also used as a summer house by Sir Cecil Spring Rice, also a UK ambassador, and Henry White, an American ambassador.

== See also ==
- National Register of Historic Places listings in Cheshire County, New Hampshire
