= James Mason House and Farm =

Historic house in West Virginia, United States

- U.S. National Register of Historic Places
- Location within West Virginia Location within the United States
- Location: 856 Little Georgetown Rd., Hedgesville, West Virginia
- Coordinates: 39°34′33″N 77°57′20″W
- Area: 170 acres (69 ha)
- Built: 1809
- Architectural style: Hall-and-parlor
- NRHP reference No.: 06001044
- Added to NRHP: November 15, 2006

James Mason House and Farm is a historic home located at Hedgesville, Berkeley County, West Virginia. The two-story stone house was built about 1809, and is a four-bay limestone building with a gable roof measuring 24 feet wide by 22 feet deep. A two-story, concrete block residential addition was completed about 1900. Also on the property is a bank barn (c. 1890) and corn crib (c. 1890).

It was listed on the National Register of Historic Places in 2006.
