= John W. Mason House =

Historic house in Minnesota, United States

- U.S. National Register of Historic Places
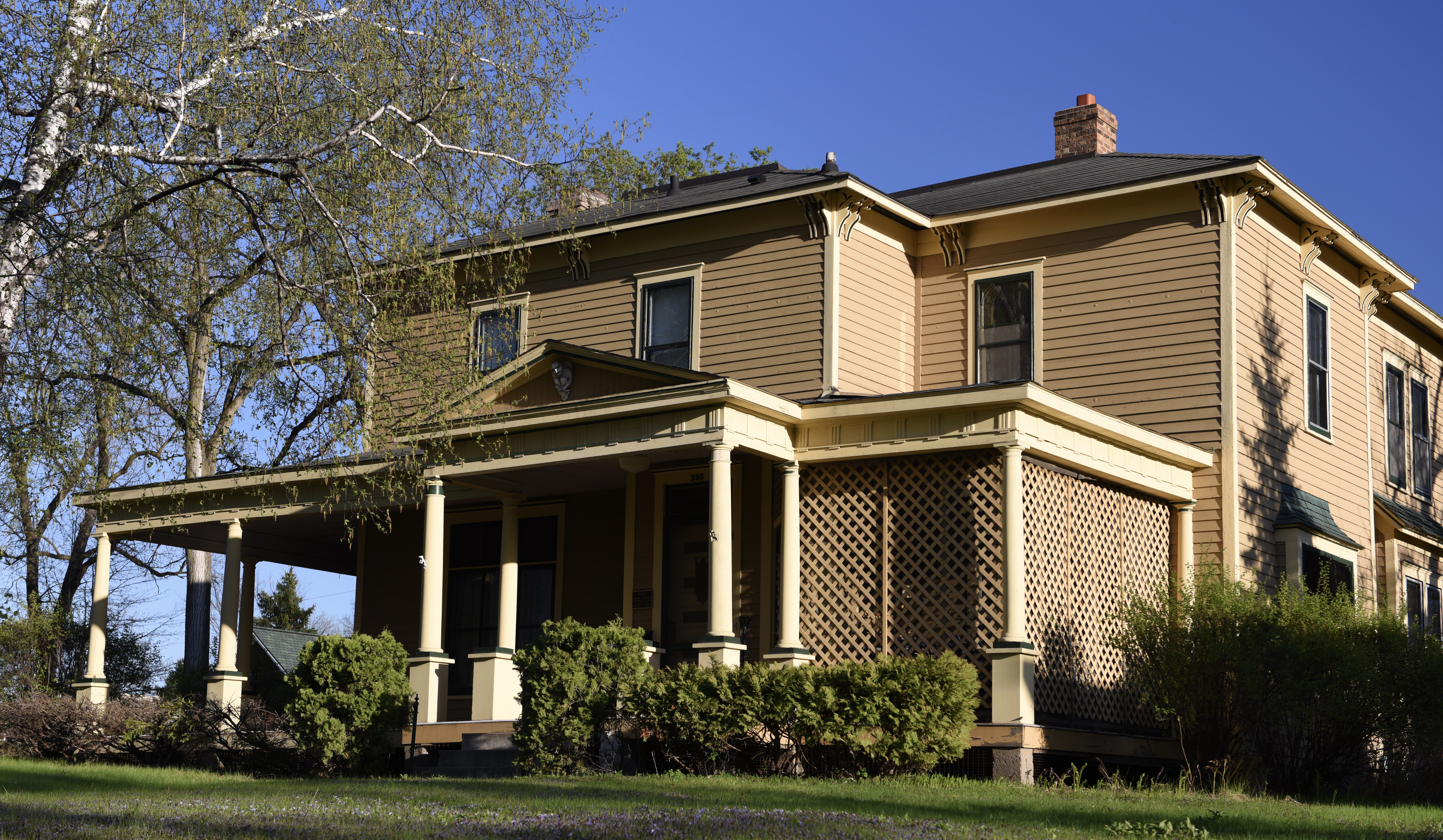

- Location within Minnesota Location within the United States
- Location: 205 W. Vernon Ave. Fergus Falls, Minnesota
- Coordinates: 46°16′41″N 96°04′35″W
- Area: 4.66 acres (1.89 ha)
- Built: 1881
- Built by: Stanford Brothers
- Architectural style: Italianate
- NRHP reference No.: 86001533
- Added to NRHP: August 13, 1986

The John W. Mason House is a historic building located in Fergus Falls, Minnesota, United States. Mason was a native of Lapeer, Michigan and one of the first settlers in town. He arrived in 1871 to establish a law practice. He served in the Minnesota Legislature, he was the first mayor of Fergus Falls, and later served as its city attorney. Mason built a small home on this same lot in 1875, and replaced it with this house in 1881. It is a two-story wood-frame structure that features a limestone foundation, low pitch hip roof, and bracketed eaves. The wrap-around porch was added around the turn of the 20th-century, and the single-story bay window was added on the southeast corner about 1905. The house was listed on the National Register of Historic Places in 1986.
