= John Mason House (Lexington, Massachusetts) =

Historic house in Massachusetts, United States

- U.S. National Register of Historic Places
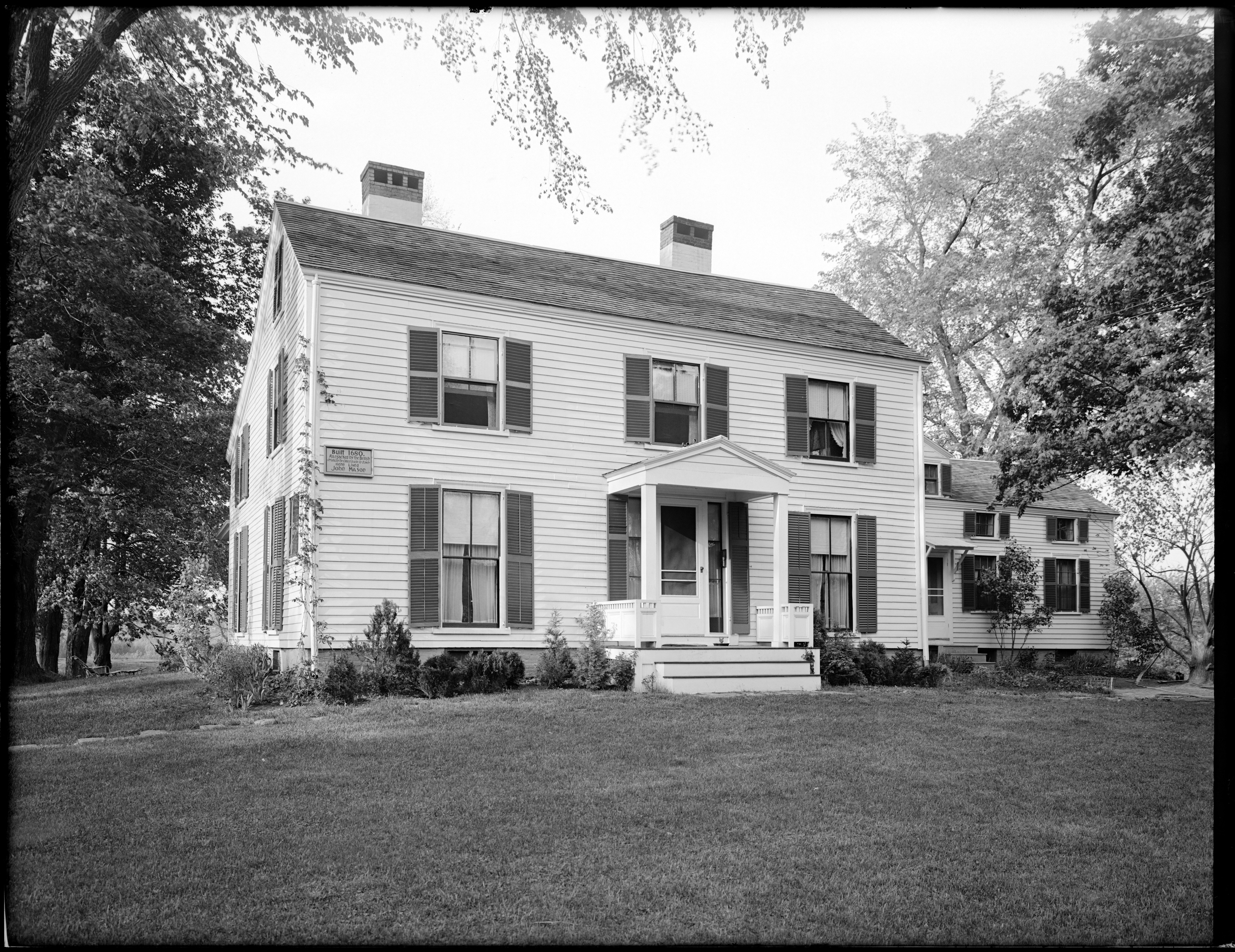
- John Mason House in 1930

- Location within Massachusetts Location within the United States
- Location: 1303 Massachusetts Avenue, Lexington, Massachusetts
- Coordinates: 42°26′28″N 71°12′54″W
- Area: 3.7 acres (1.5 ha)
- Built: 1715
- Architectural style: Colonial
- MPS: First Period Buildings of Eastern Massachusetts TR
- NRHP reference No.: 90000172
- Added to NRHP: March 9, 1990

The John Mason House is a historic First Period house in Lexington, Massachusetts. It is a 2 1/2-story wood-frame structure, its main block three bays wide, with a side-gable roof, clapboard siding, and two chimneys set behind the roof ridge. A leanto section to the rear gives it a saltbox profile, and an ell extends to the right. The oldest portion of the house, a three-bay portion of its main block, was built circa 1715. The building has been repeatedly extended and altered over the years. John Mason, its builder, was a prominent local citizen.

The house was listed on the National Register of Historic Places in 1990.

== See also ==
- National Register of Historic Places listings in Middlesex County, Massachusetts
