= John Mason House (Winchester, Massachusetts) =

Historic house in Massachusetts, United States

- U.S. National Register of Historic Places
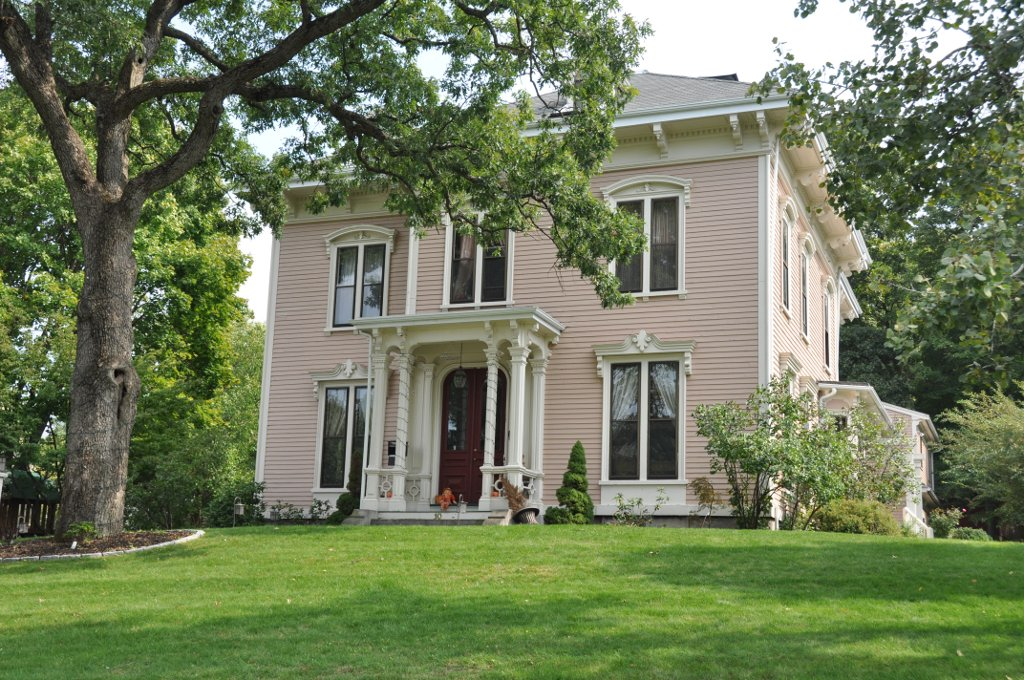

- Location within Massachusetts Location within the United States
- Location: 10 Hillside Avenue, Winchester, Massachusetts
- Coordinates: 42°26′59″N 71°7′57″W
- Built: 1865
- Architectural style: Italianate
- MPS: Winchester MRA
- NRHP reference No.: 89000634
- Added to NRHP: July 5, 1989

The John Mason House is a historic house in Winchester, Massachusetts. This two-story wood-frame house was built sometime in the 1860s, probably for Joshua Stone, who sold it to John Mason sometime before 1875. Mason was one of the first Boston businessmen to establish a suburban residence in Winchester. The house has a variety of high-style Italianate features, including a characteristic low-pitch hip roof with decorative brackets, and a three-bay front facade in which paired narrow windows are topped by decorative framing. The front entry is sheltered by a portico supported by multiple columns and pilasters, with a bracketed roof.

The house was listed on the National Register of Historic Places in 1989.

== See also ==
- National Register of Historic Places listings in Winchester, Massachusetts
