= Webster, New York =

Town in Monroe County, New York, United States

- Town
- Motto: "Where Life Is Worth Living"
- Location in Monroe County and the state of New York

- Location of New York in the United States
- Coordinates: 43°12′32″N 77°27′34″W
- Country: United States
- State: New York
- County: Monroe
- Established: February 6, 1840; 186 years ago

Government
  - Town supervisor: Tom Flaherty (R; 2019-present) Town council: Ginny Nguyen (R); John Cahill (R); Jennifer Wright (R); Patricia T. Cataldi (R)

Area
  - Total: 35.22 sq mi (91.2 km^{2})
  - Land: 33.52 sq mi (86.8 km^{2})
  - Water: 1.71 sq mi (4.4 km^{2})
- Elevation: 442 ft (135 m)

Population (2020)
  - Total: 45,327
  - Density: 1,352.4/sq mi (522.2/km^{2})
- Time zone: UTC-5 (EST)
  - Summer (DST): UTC-4 (EDT)
- ZIP Codes: 14580 (Webster); 14519 (Ontario); 14563 (Union Hill)
- Area code: 585
- FIPS code: 36-055-78971
- Website: www.websterny.gov

Webster is a town in the northeastern corner of Monroe County, New York, United States. The town is named after orator and statesman Daniel Webster. The population was 45,327 at the 2020 census, up from 42,641 in 2010. The town contains a village also named Webster. It is located in the Rochester Metropolitan Area.

== History ==
On July 25, 1837, orator and statesman Daniel Webster spoke to a gathering of Whigs in nearby Rochester about the economy. Whig farmers from North Penfield, who were part of Webster's audience, were so impressed by his eloquence that when they petitioned the state legislature for separate town status from Penfield, they chose to name it in his honor. On February 6, 1840, the northern part of Penfield was officially established as the town of Webster, with a population of 2,235. Webster has its own museum dedicated to sharing the town's history with its citizens. The museum has many permanent historical displays and also features changing displays for different times of the year.

The 2012 Webster shooting occurred on December 24, 2012, when 62-year-old William Spengler ambushed volunteer firefighters from the West Webster Fire Department, shooting and killing two and seriously wounding two others as they arrived to put out a car fire he had started. Seven homes were destroyed because firefighters were unable to extinguish the flames until the scene was made safe by law enforcement. Volunteer fire fighters Mike Chiapperini and Tomasz Kaczowka died at the scene. Theodore Scardino and Joseph Hofstetter were hospitalized with serious injuries. John Ritter, a policeman from nearby Greece, New York, happened to be in the area, and was injured by shrapnel. The New York State Senate subsequently included a "Webster provision" in the NY SAFE Act, mandating life without parole for murderers of emergency personnel.

== Geography ==
The town of Webster is bordered on the north by Lake Ontario, on the east by the towns of Ontario and Walworth in Wayne County, on the west by Irondequoit Bay and the town of Irondequoit, and on the south by the town of Penfield.

According to the U.S. Census Bureau, the town has a total area of 35.2 square miles (91 km^{2}), of which 33.5 square miles (87 km^{2}) are land and 1.7 square miles (4.4 km^{2}), or 4.85%, are water. Irondequoit Bay, an inlet of Lake Ontario, contains most of the water area within the town.

Webster Park covers 550 acres (2.2 km^{2}) of the town's land along the Lake Ontario waterfront.

== Demographics ==
Historical population
Census	Pop.	Note	%±
1840	2,235		—
1850	2,446		9.4%
1860	2,650		8.3%
1870	2,749		3.7%
1880	2,950		7.3%
1890	3,139		6.4%
1900	3,299		5.1%
1910	3,755		13.8%
1920	3,976		5.9%
1930	4,778		20.2%
1940	5,520		15.5%
1950	7,174		30.0%
1960	16,434		129.1%
1970	24,739		50.5%
1980	28,925		16.9%
1990	31,639		9.4%
2000	37,926		19.9%
2010	42,641		12.4%
2020	45,327		6.3%
2022 (est.)	45,335	▲	0.0%
U.S. Decennial Census

As of the 2020 United States census, there were 45,327 people, 19,432 households, and 12,483 families residing in the town. The population density was 1,352.4 inhabitants per square mile (522.2/km^{2}). There were 20,132 housing units at an average density of 600.4 per square mile (231.8/km^{2}). The racial makeup of the town was 89.2% White, 2.9% Black or African American, 0.0% Native American, 3.2% Asian, and 3.6% from two or more races. Hispanic or Latino of any race were 4.2% of the population.

Among the 19,432 households, 27.3% had children under the age of 18 living with them, 49.9% were married couples, 7.0% were cohabitating unmarried couples, 13.9% had a male householder with no spouse/partner present, and 29.2% had a female householder with no spouse/partner present. 30.6% of all households were made up of individuals, and 14.6% had someone living alone who was 65 years of age or older. The average household size was 2.31 and the average family size was 2.86.

In the town, the population was spread out, with 20.4% under the age of 18, 5.5% from 18 to 24, 23.7% from 25 to 44, 29.3% from 45 to 64, and 20.8% who were 65 years of age or older. The median age was 45.1 years as of 2021. For every 100 females, there were 90.4 males.

In 2021, the median income for a household in the town was $81,345, and the median income for a family was $108,065. Males had a median income of $52,494 versus $33,943 for females. The per capita income for the town was $43,896. About 3.0% of families and 5.3% of the population were below the poverty line, including 5.0% of those under age 18 and 7.2% of those age 65 or over.

== Education ==
Webster's public schools are under the direction of the Webster Central School District (K-12). While all of its middle schools (Spry, Willink) and high schools (Thomas, Schroeder) are situated in the town of Webster, only five of its seven elementary schools (DeWitt Road, Klem North, Klem South, Schlegel Road, State Road) are, with two (Plank Road, Plank South) located 1 mile south of the town line, in Penfield.

Additionally, there are several privately run schools:

- Hillside Children's Center Halpern Education Center (grades 6–12), secular
- Lakeside Alpha (grades 3–12), Christian Brethren
- Rochester Christian School (grades pre-K–8), Calvinist
- St. Rita's School (grades pre-K–5), operated by the Roman Catholic Diocese of Rochester
- Webster Early Learning Center (grades pre-K–1), secular
- Webster Montessori School (grades pre-K-6), ¾ mile south of the town line in Penfield serving students within the Webster school district zone

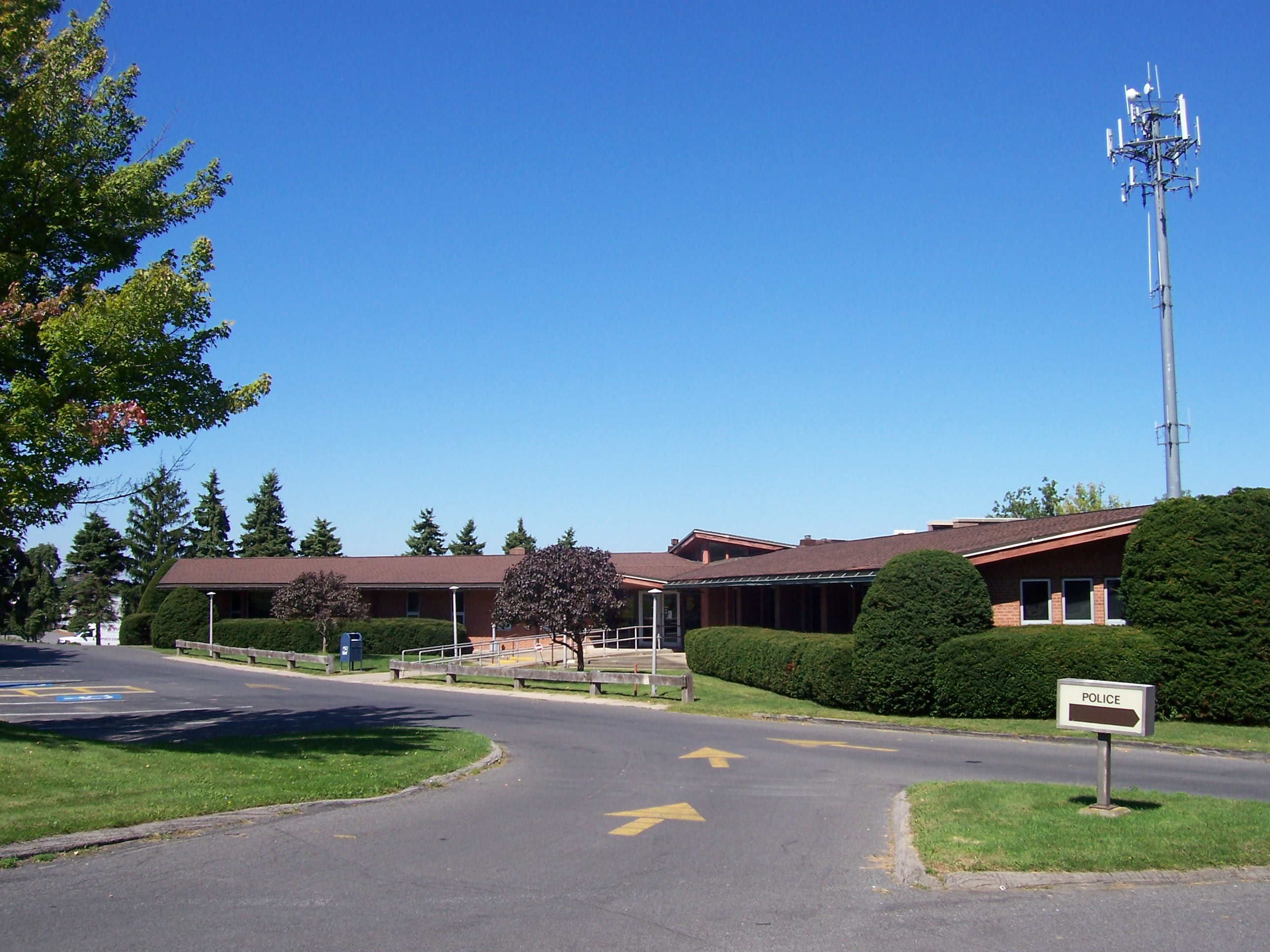
Webster town hall

== Public safety ==
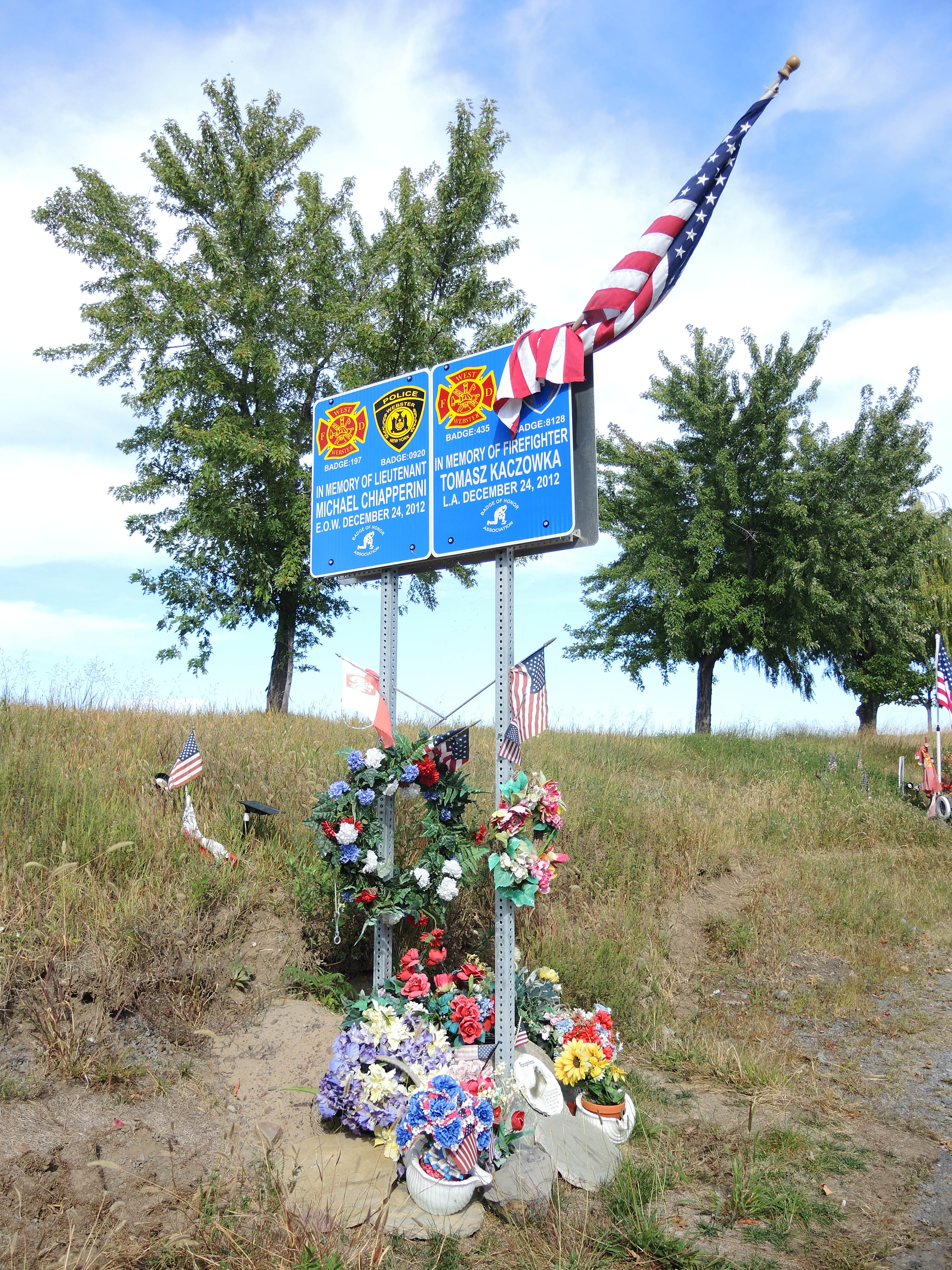
Memorial for Chiapperini and Kaczowka

The Webster Police Department protects the citizens of Webster as a New York State Law Enforcement Accreditation Council agency. Dennis Kohlmeier is the current Chief of the Department. It consists of around thirty sworn officers.

Fire protection is covered by two agencies. On the west side of town, the West Webster Fire District provides fire protection. It is an all-volunteer department. Fire stations are located on Gravel Road, Backus Road, and Plank Road in Penfield.

The east of town, including the village, are protected by the North East Joint Fire District (Webster F.D.) It is an all-volunteer department, as it has been for over one hundred years. Fire stations located on South Avenue in the village, Phillips Road in the town and Plank Road in Penfield.

Ambulance service for the Town is provided by Webster EMS. North East Quadrant Advanced Life Support, Inc. provides ALS care for all patients in need. Webster and West Webster fire departments provide EMS separate from ambulance depending on the severity of the call.

== Notable people ==
- Elma Bellini, New York Supreme Court justice
- Joseph L. Biehler, U.S. Army major general
- Brian Bliss, soccer player, coach, and front office executive
- Paul Buchheit, lead developer of Gmail and originator of the Google motto "Don't be Evil"
- Grant Catalino, Major League Lacrosse player (New York Lizards)
- Philo Dunning, member of the Wisconsin State Assembly
- Eugene K. Felt, member of the Wisconsin State Assembly
- Susan Gibney, actress
- Gregor Gillespie, professional mixed martial artist
- Lou Gramm, born Louis Andrew Grammatico; songwriter and lead singer of the rock band Foreigner
- Kara Lynn Joyce, swimmer, US National Team; medalist in the 2004 and 2008 Summer Olympics
- Pat Kelly, player for the National Football League Denver Broncos and New York Jets
- Brian King, director of the Food and Drug Administration's Center for Tobacco Products
- Brian Kozlowski, player for the NFL
- Richard Leone, New Jersey Democratic Party politician; New Jersey State Treasurer
- Edward Tsang Lu, Space Shuttle astronaut (also resided on the International Space Station)
- Joe Whelan, distance runner
- Wendy O. Williams, punk rock singer (The Plasmatics)

== Communities and locations ==
- Avalon Estates – a neighborhood development located off Phillips Road
- Lake Road – a neighborhood also known as Fieldcrest located on Webster's east side. It runs along the town's northeastern Lake Ontario shoreline.
- Forest Lawn – a neighborhood in the northwest part of the town, on the shore of Lake Ontario
- Gallant Fox – a neighborhood at the end of Webster Road near Hedges Nine Mile Point Restaurant and Bar and Mama Lor’s Restaurant
- Glen Edith – a location on the west side of the town, on the shore of Irondequoit Bay
- Oakmonte – a large neighborhood in the central-southern part of the town consisting of private homes, apartments, and town homes
- Parkwood – a smaller neighborhood with its main entrance off Klem Road and directly across from Klem North Elementary School. A community park shares its name.
- Union Hill – a hamlet on the Wayne County line at the intersection of NY-404 and Ridge Road
- Webster village, located in the center of the town
- West Webster – a hamlet at the intersection of Ridge and Gravel Road

== See also ==
- Webster Public Library
