= Mary C. Tanner =

American investment banker

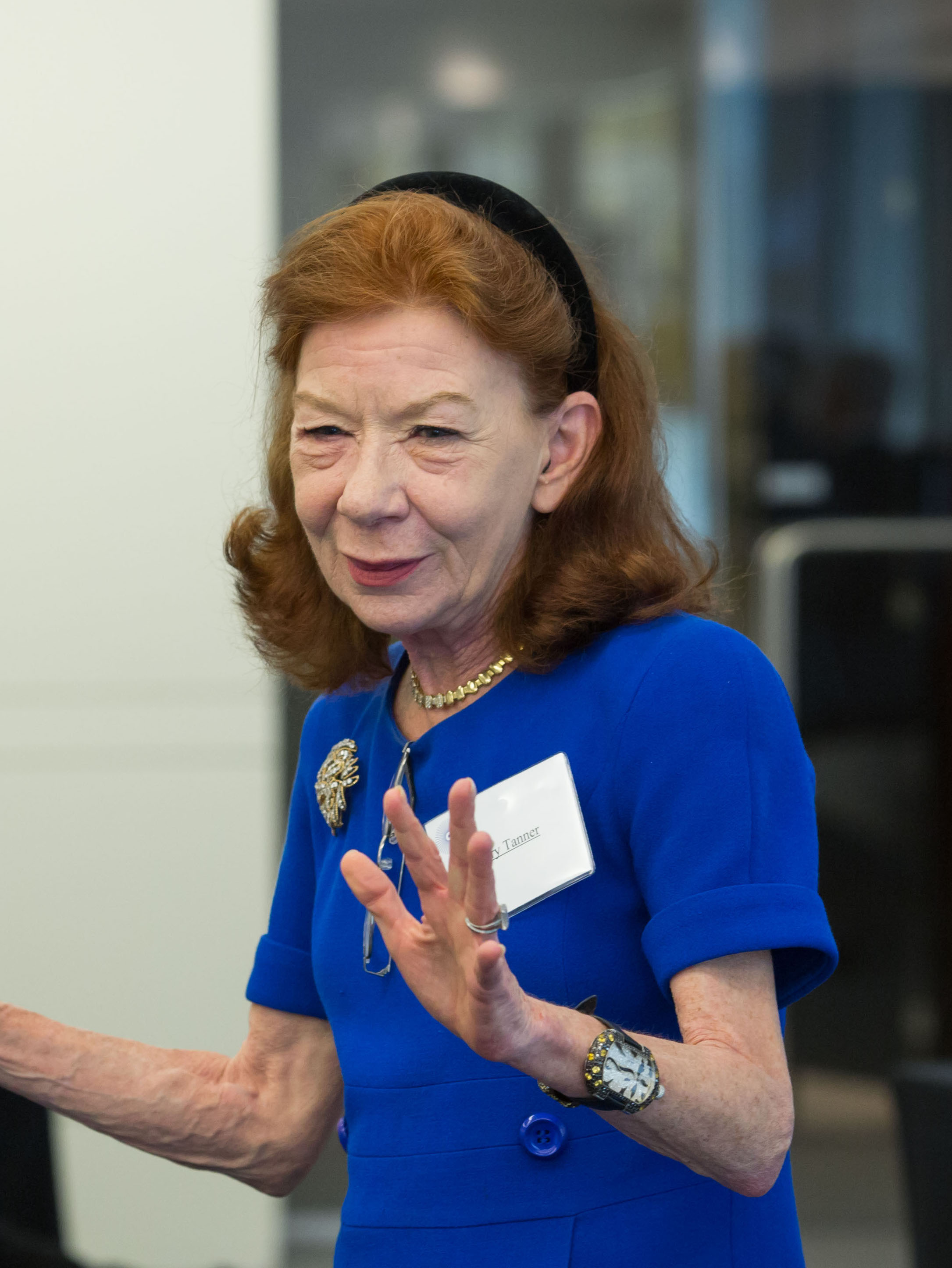
- Born: October 10, 1951 (age 75)
- Education: Harvard University
- Spouse: Frederick Frank
- Scientific career
- Fields: Investment banking, biotechnology
- Workplaces: EVOLUTION Life Science Partners, Peter J. Solomon Company, Lehman Brothers

Mary Catherine Tanner is an investment banker, with more than 25 years of experience on Wall Street. She specializes in the areas of biotechnology, pharmaceuticals, and health care services. Her expertise includes ethical pharmaceuticals and green technology. Fluent in both English and French, she specializes in cross-border transactions between large and small companies, corporate partnering and minority investments.

As of 2014, Tanner was Senior Managing Director of EVOLUTION Life Science Partners (ELSP), and a co-founder and chair of Life Science Partners LLP. Previously she served as Senior Managing Director of Lehman Brothers, Bear Stearns, and the Peter J. Solomon Company. Tanner was the first woman to become a partner at Lehman Brothers. She is credited with directing over 130 IPOs for life sciences organizations, and over 500 mergers and acquisitions.

== Early life and education ==
Mary Catherine Tanner was born to Donald N. Tanner and Marilyn S. Tanner. Her father was a civil engineer. Her mother was an educator working with learning-disabled children. Tanner graduated from Harvard University in 1973 with a B.A. in philosophy, magna cum laude.

== Career ==
In 1978, Tanner was included in a team at Lehman Brothers, to handle Humana's acquisition of American Medicorp. The team was led by Frederick Frank. Frank convinced Tanner to join his team at Lehman. Ten years later, on October 15, 1988, they were married. Tanner became Senior Managing Director of Lehman Brothers, while Frank became vice chair of Lehman Brothers. Frank and Tanner worked together at Lehman for over ten years, until Tanner took time off to have a child.

Tanner returned to work as the Senior Managing Director at Bear Stearns as of 2000, and retired from Bear Stearns in 2004, to found Life Sciences Partners.

As of March 18, 2009, Mary Tanner and Frederick Frank joined Peter J. Solomon, of PJ SOLOMON to form a new practice focusing on pharmaceuticals and life sciences. Tanner became a managing director at Peter J. Solomon, while Frank became a vice chairman.

As of January 15, 2013, Mary Tanner and Frederick Frank joined Burrill & Company. Tanner became the Senior Managing Director of Burrill Securities and of Burrill & Company.

As of 2014, Tanner and Frank founded EVOLUTION Life Science Partners (ELSP). Tanner is Senior Managing Director of EVOLUTION Life Science Partners (ELSP), and a co-founder and chair of Life Science Partners LLP.

Tanner has served on numerous advisory groups and boards of directors. She is credited with over 130 IPOs and over 500 mergers and acquisitions for life sciences organizations. During her time at Lehmann, Tanner represented Rhône-Poulenc when it acquired Rorer for $1.8 billion in 1990, and in 1995 represented Rhône-Poulenc Rorer when it acquired Fisons for £1.8 billion. Together, Tanner and Frederick Frank represented Marion Merrell Dow in its merger with Hoechst AG, forming Hoechst Marion Roussel, Inc. in 1995. While at Bear Stearns, Tanner represented Pfizer when it acquired Pharmacia for $60 billion (2002-2003). She also represented Amgen when it acquired Immunex for $16 billion.

== Philanthropy ==
As of October, 1997, the non-profit Tanner Frank Foundation of New York City was granted charitable status. Tanner has served on the Dean's Council for the Yale School of Medicine and on the advisory board for the Yale School of Management (SOM). Tanner and Frank have made multiple gifts to Yale, including early career support of researchers in autism at the Yale School of Medicine, and the creation of the Frank and Tanner Professor of Management at the Yale School of Management, to which Olav Sorenson was appointed on April 9, 2012.

== Awards and honors ==
- 2012, Oracle award, Springboard Enterprises, for professional accomplishment and mentoring of women entrepreneurs.
