= Frederick Frank (businessman) =

Investment banker (1932–2021)

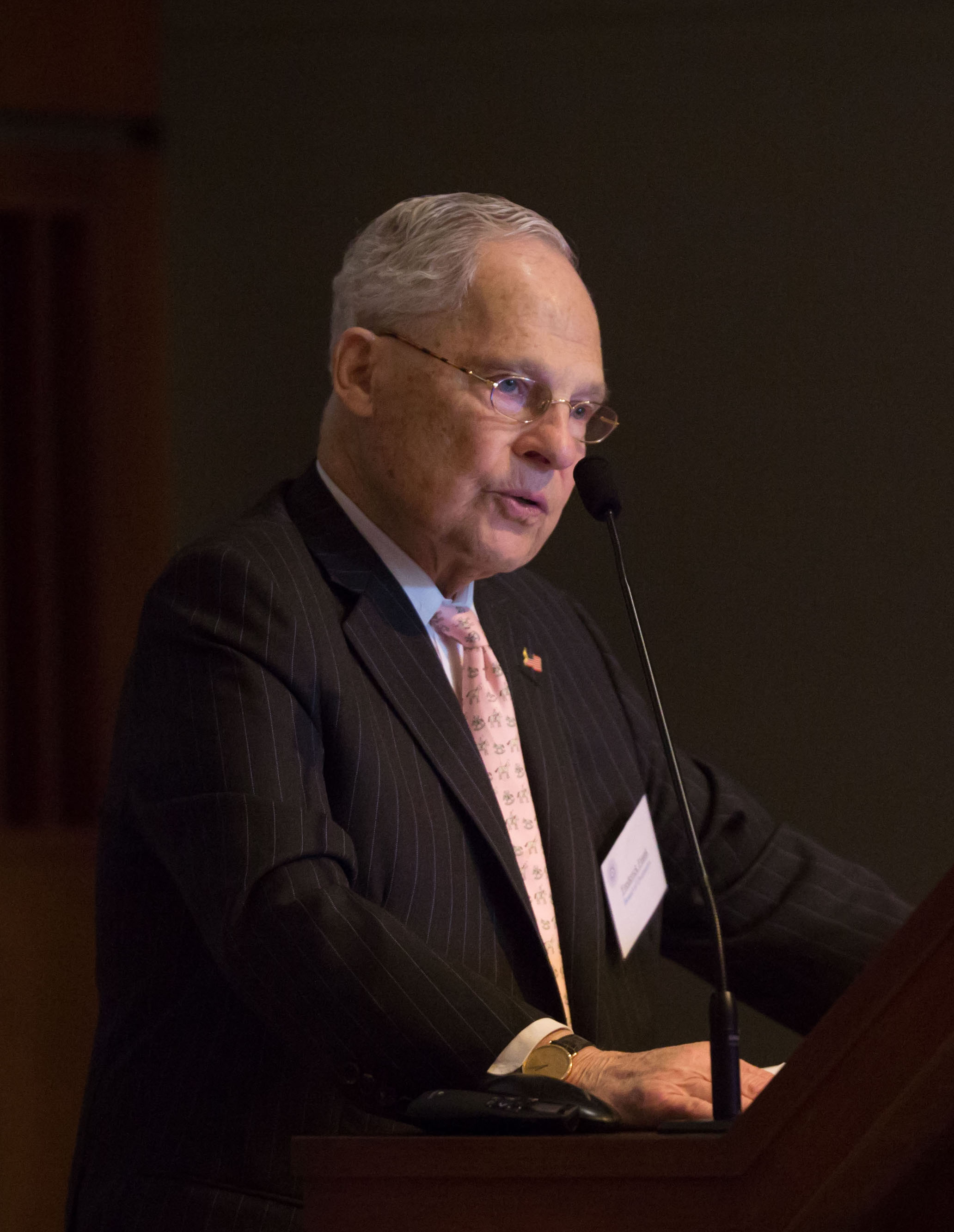
- Born: May 31, 1932; Salt Lake City, Utah, U.S.
- Died: September 11, 2021 (aged 89)
- Education: Yale University, Stanford Graduate School of Business
- Spouse: Mary C. Tanner
- Awards: Richard J. Bolte Sr. Award
- Scientific career
- Fields: Investment banking, biotechnology
- Workplaces: EVOLUTION Life Science Partners, Peter J. Solomon Company, Lehman Brothers, Barclays Capital

External videos
- “BIO at 25-Jim Greenwood and Frederick Frank Discuss Early Biotech investment”, Biotechnology Innovation Organization, 2018

Frederick Frank (May 31, 1932 – September 11, 2021) was an American banker, with more than 50 years of experience on Wall Street. He is considered the first investment banker to have specialized in the areas of biotechnology, pharmaceuticals, and health care services.

As of 2014, Frank became a founder and chair of EVOLUTION Life Science Partners. He previously served as vice chairman of Lehman Brothers, Barclays Capital, and the Peter J. Solomon Company. He is credited as lead underwriter for over 125 IPOs and as a negotiator in over 75 mergers and acquisitions. Frank was chosen as one of the top 100 contributors to biotechnology in 2005.

== Early life and education ==
Frederick Frank was born on May 31, 1932, to Simon Frank and Suzanne (Seller) Frank of Salt Lake City, Utah. Simon Frank ran a men's wear business established by his father, Arthur Frank. He completed high school at Hotchkiss School in Lakeville, Connecticut in 1950.

Frank graduated in the class of 1954 from Yale University with a degree in philosophy. He served in the U.S. Army in Europe from 1954 to 1956, much of the time in Paris, France at Supreme Headquarters Allied Powers Europe (SHAPE). After returning to the United States, he received an MBA from Stanford Graduate School of Business in 1958.

== Career ==
In 1958, Frank joined Smith, Barney and Company. He chose to accept their offer because they had a highly ranked research department. After completing the required formal training program, Frank joined the research department to work with Bill Grant on the pharmaceutical and chemical industries. He soon proposed splitting the two areas, and became Wall Street’s first industry analyst dedicated to pharmaceuticals. In 1962, he shifted focus to the life sciences industries, dealing with medical devices, diagnostics companies, and healthcare services. He held the positions of co-leader of research, vice president, and director at Smith, Barney.

In October 1969, Frank left Smith Barney and joined Lehman Brothers, the first person from outside the organization to join it at the level of partner. Leaving research and analysis, he shifted to investment banking, handling capital investment and mergers and acquisitions. Frank is credited with creating original and at times unprecedented structures that have connected innovative early-stage research-oriented companies with larger development and market-oriented pharmaceutical corporations.

In 1978, Frank led a team at Lehman Brothers, handling Humana's acquisition of American Medicorp. The team included Mary Catherine Tanner, a recent graduate from Harvard University. Frank convinced her to join his team at Lehman. Ten years later, on October 15, 1988, they were married. Frank became vice chair of Lehman Brothers in 1995. Tanner became senior managing director. Frank and Tanner worked together at Lehman for over ten years, until Tanner took time off to have a child.

In the late 1970s, Frank began to work with companies such as Cetus, a company developing industrial applications for Recombinant DNA technology, and Genentech. Frank saw rDNA technology as a "game-changing opportunity". Advised by Frank, Cetus went public on March 1, 1981 with the second-largest IPO in U.S. corporate history. Frank was also instrumental in the Bristol-Myers Squibb merger of 1989 and the Hoffmann-La Roche acquisition of Genentech in 1990. At the time, the merger of an established pharmaceutical company with a younger biotechnology company was highly unusual. It has been described by Frank as a "strategy of convergence".

After Barclays Capital bought Lehman's U.S. capital markets unit in September 2008, Frank became a vice chair at Barclays Capital.

As of March 18, 2009, Frederick Frank and Mary Tanner joined Peter J. Solomon, of PJ SOLOMON to form a new practice focusing on pharmaceuticals and life sciences. Frank became a vice chairman at Peter J. Solomon, while Tanner became a managing director.

As of January 15, 2013, Frederick Frank and Mary Tanner joined Burrill & Company. Frank became chair of Burrill Securities (2013–) and vice chair of Burrill and Company (January 15, 2013–). Tanner became the Senior Managing Director of Burrill Securities and of Burrill & Company.

As of 2014, Frank and Tanner founded EVOLUTION Life Science Partners, and Frank became chair of the company. Frank has also served on numerous advisory groups and boards of directors.

== Philanthropy ==
As of October, 1997, the non-profit Tanner Frank Foundation of New York City was granted charitable status. Frank has served on the board of advisors of the School of Management (SOM) at Yale University, and has given generously to SOM. Gifts include the establishment of a language study fellowship and a visiting professorship in 1998. In 2007, he established a professorship, which was first filled in 2009 when Gary Gorton became Yale's first Frederick Frank Class of 1954 Professor of Management and Finance. On April 9, 2012 Olav Sorenson became the inaugural holder of the Frank and Tanner Professor of Management.

Frank died on September 11, 2021, at the age of 89.

== Awards and honors ==
- 2019, Richard J. Bolte Sr. Award for supporting industries
- 2006, Gilda's Club of New York City Visionary Award
- 2005, Top 100 living contributors to biotechnology, Reed Elsevier
- 2004, Albert Einstein Award from the Weizmann Institute of Science
- 1998, Outstanding Contributions in the Field of Immunology, Irvington Institute for Immunological Research
- 1997, Hall of Fame Award, The Biotech Meeting in Laguna Niguel, California.
