= Peter Solomon =

Peter Solomon may refer to:

- Peter Solomon (baseball) (born 1996), American baseball player
- Peter Solomon (The Lost Symbol), a character in the novel, The Lost Symbol
- Peter J. Solomon Company, an investment banking advisory firm
- Peter Solomon, designer of The Handle, an electric guitar
