= Kenneth Schuman =

Government official, business executive, social work administrator

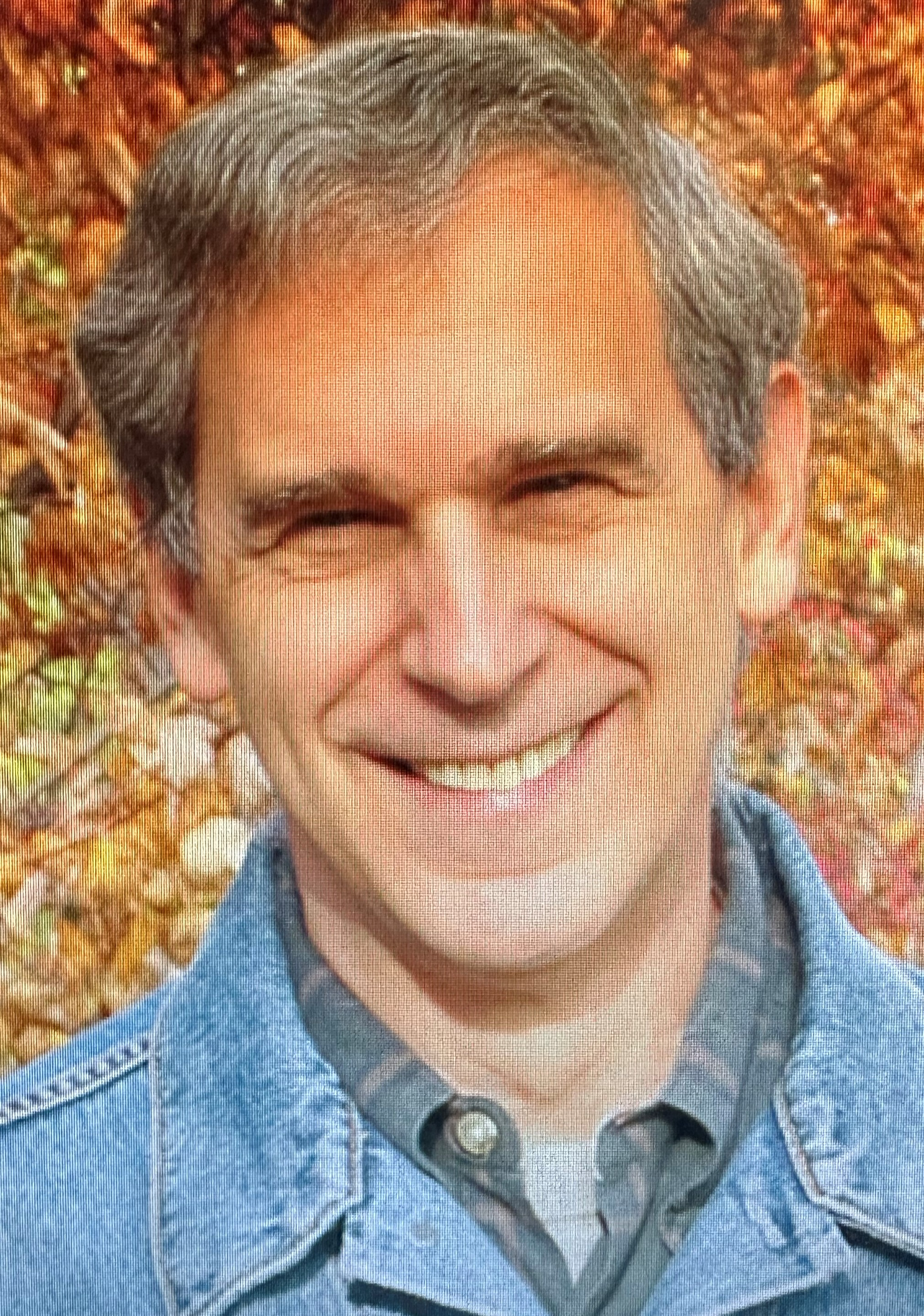
- Born: December 18, 1943 (age 82); Brooklyn, NY
- Education: Hamilton College, B.A. 1965 Columbia University, M.B.A 1967 Hunter College, M.S.W, 1977
- Known for: NYC Commissioner for Economic Development
- Spouse: Wendy R. Schuman

Kenneth S. Schuman served as executive director of New York City's Office of Economic Development and as NYC Commissioner for Economic Development under Mayor Edward I. Koch from 1978 to 1981, during the period following the city's brush with bankruptcy. After Deputy Mayor Peter J. Solomon’s departure in June 1980, Schuman was New York City's top economic development official until the appointment of Karen N. Gerard as Deputy Mayor in February 1981. Schuman continued serving as Commissioner until December 31, 1981 when he resigned to work as vice president in the corporate finance division of the investment banking firm, Lehman Brothers Kuhn Loeb.

He also was Managing Partner of Affordable Living L.P., which developed housing for low- and moderate-income families based on New Jersey's Mount Laurel doctrine. In addition, Schuman was executive director of the Queens County Mental Health Society and the first executive director of the Lower East Side Family Union, an innovative social services agency helping to prevent unnecessary foster care placement of children.

In retirement he co-founded, with his wife Wendy, the nonprofit coaching program Grad Life Choices, which enlists over 100 volunteer coaches to help young college grads begin their career journey, and he wrote books on career development and on the life of Michelangelo.

== Early life and education ==
Kenneth S. Schuman was born in Brooklyn, NY on December 18, 1943, to Arthur Schuman, president of Fidelity Insurance Company, and Florence (Berger) Schuman. He was raised along with his brother Allan in Rockville Centre, NY and graduated from Hamilton College. He went on to receive a Master of Business Administration degree from Columbia University and a Master of Social Work from the Silberman School of Social Work at Hunter College.

== Career ==
=== Social Work ===
In 1970, Schuman was hired as assistant director of Hudson Guild, a settlement house providing a wide array of social services to low-income residents of the Chelsea section of Manhattan.

In 1974, he became executive director of the Queens County Mental Health Society at a time when alcoholism and drug abuse were proliferating and public mental hospitals, such as Creedmoor Psychiatric Center in Queens, were warehousing overmedicated mental patients. Schuman obtained funding from The New York Community Trust to institute a program for prevention of teen alcoholism and was among the local leaders advocating for community-based programs, including halfway houses.

In 1976 Schuman became the first executive director of the Lower East Side Family Union, an innovative program to prevent unnecessary foster care placement of children in high-risk families by providing intensive support to the family. A book was written about the program, Integrating Services for Troubled Families by Harold H. Weissman (Jossey-Bass, 1978). The program still exists on the Lower East Side of Manhattan and has expanded into Queens, NY.

=== Government ===
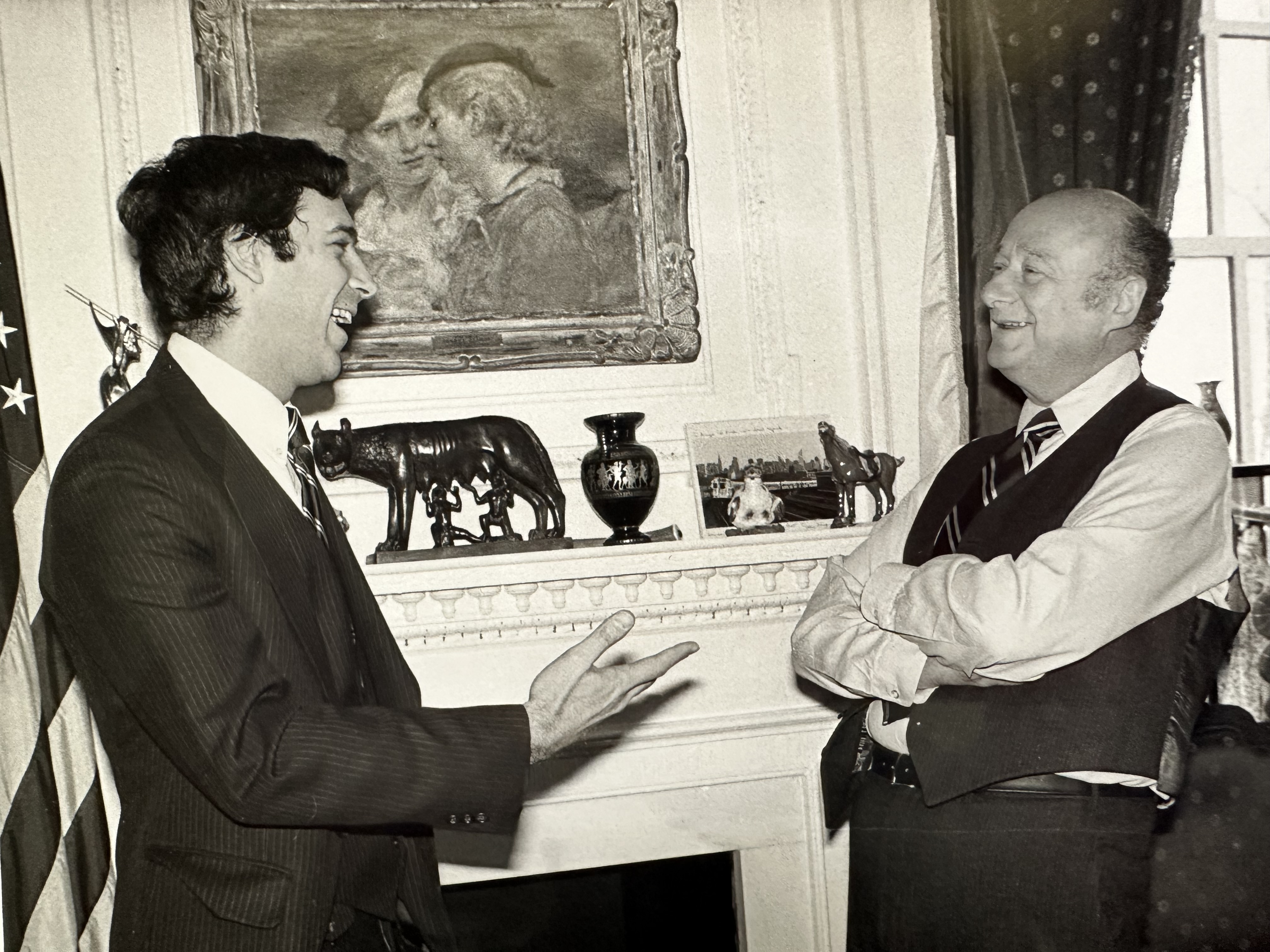
Schuman (left) and Mayor Ed Koch at City Hall in 1980

In 1978, Schuman was hired by Peter J. Solomon, New York City's Deputy Mayor for Economic Policy and Development, to work as his assistant. He was soon after promoted by Solomon to deputy director and then executive director of the NYC Office of Economic Development. And in 1979 he was appointed Commissioner for Economic Development of New York City.

This period, from 1978 to 1981, followed shortly after the city's near-bankruptcy in the mid-1970's when large numbers of corporations left New York for the suburbs or other parts of the country, with President Ford announcing in October 1975 that there would be no bailouts for New York City. (NY Daily News headline—"Ford to City: Drop Dead”).

By 1980 the City experienced a turn-around and, for the first time since 1967, had a net increase in the number of ‘Fortune 500’ companies. As Commissioner, Schuman oversaw efforts to retain and attract business and support economic activity throughout the city. He helped enable development of the Times Square theater district, including a new 2,000-room hotel, as well as the South Street Seaport in lower Manhattan and Astoria Studios in Queens.

He also oversaw programs to revitalize community commercial areas (such as Borough Park and Fulton Mall in Brooklyn), and industrial parks in deteriorated areas (such as the Lyons Industrial Park in the South Bronx). In addition, Schuman helped negotiate the purchase of the Brooklyn Army Terminal from the federal government for redevelopment as an industrial complex.

As chairman of the NYC Industrial & Commercial Incentive Board, Vice Chairman of the NYC Economic Capital Corporation, and board member of the South Bronx Development Corporation, Schuman encouraged industrial and commercial development in the outer boroughs through the use of tax abatements and low-cost financing while restricting tax breaks in midtown Manhattan.

=== Business ===
In 1982 Schuman moved from his position as NYC Commissioner to vice president at Lehman Brothers where his primary focus was on mergers and acquisitions and equity and debt financing.

In 1983 along with two associates, he founded Affordable Living L.P. to develop housing for low- and moderate-income families. This work and that of a subsequent company, American Newlands, of which he was also co-founder, resulted in the development of thousands of housing units, primarily in New Jersey.

In 2005 Schuman created a coaching company, Careers Transition Associates, to provide career coaching, primarily for mid-career executives. In 2007 he co-authored a personal development book The Michelangelo Method: Release Your Inner Masterpiece and Create an Extraordinary Life (McGraw-Hill).

=== Volunteer ===
In 2012, in response to the Great Recession, Schuman and his wife Wendy founded a nonprofit coaching program, Grad Life Choices, to help low-income young college graduates who were unable to find work and who were becoming a “lost generation.” The Grad Life Choices program has over 100 certified life and career coaches helping grads figure out their career direction and then get started on that career. To help prepare coaches to work with the young college grads, Schuman and his wife wrote the book Millennials in Wonderland: Coaching Grads at the Crossroads of Life and Career.

== Personal life ==
Schuman has been married to writer and editor Wendy (Rosenblum) Schuman since 1968. They have two children, Corinne and Andrew, and four grandchildren. Schuman highly values time with his family and left Lehman Brothers in part because the demands of the job allowed little room for family life. His decision to leave was featured in the New York Times Sunday Magazine article, “Putting Kids First.”
