= Government Efficiency Commission =

Government Efficiency Commission may refer to:

- Commission on Economy and Efficiency
- Department of Government Efficiency
- Spending and Government Efficiency Commission
