= Gunvald Aus =

Norwegian-American engineer

- Born: Gunvald Aus; May 30, 1851; Haugesund, Rogaland, Norway
- Died: May 27, 1950 (aged 98); Asker, Norway
- Education: Technical University of Munich
- Known for: Woolworth Building in New York City

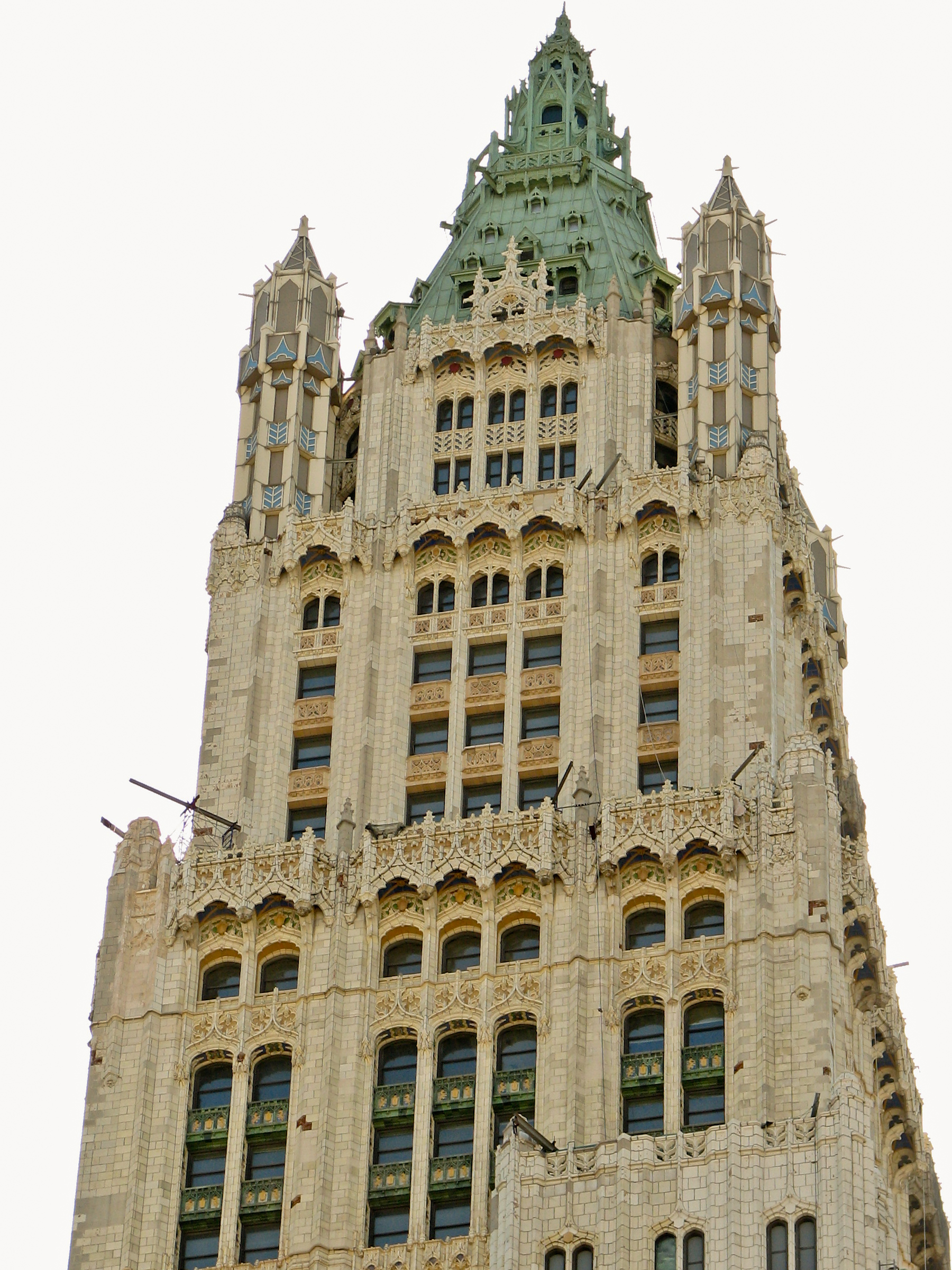
Woolworth Building - New York City

Gunvald Aus, also written Aas (May 30, 1851 – May 27, 1950) was a Norwegian-American engineer. He is most associated with the engineering of the Woolworth Building in New York City.

== Background ==
He was born the son of Gabriel Godfrey Aas and Sophie Schroeder in Haugesund in the county of Rogaland, Norway. He was educated at the Bergen Technical School (now Norwegian University of Science and Technology (1879). He graduated from the Technical University of Munich (1882). He was then hired in the Norwegian Directorate of Public Roads as an assistant to Road Director Hans Hagerup Krag, but left for the United States in 1883. Initially, he was employed by railroad and highway bridge designer Theodore Cooper.

== Career ==
Having worked in different companies, including the Phoenix Bridge Company, he was hired as chief engineer in the United States Department of the Treasury. In 1902, he started his own firm of consulting engineers, Gusvald Aus Company in New York City. The firm completed the engineering work for a number of projects including Harkness Memorial Quadrangle at Yale University, the Minnesota State Capitol in St. Paul and the Library building at Northwestern University. Together with his chief assistant, Kort Berle, he later was involved in the construction of the Woolworth Building. Gunvald Aus Company designed the steel frame, supported on massive caissons that penetrate to the bedrock.

During 1914, he did the structural engineering for the construction of the Austin, Nichols & Company Warehouse in Brooklyn, a building significant for its architecture and engineering. It was one of many collaborations with architect Cass Gilbert and was viewed as an "engineering marvel".

In 1915, he retired from active leadership in business and handed control to Kort Berle. Gunvald Aus had become an American citizen in 1892 but he returned to Norway and in 1917 he regained his Norwegian citizenship. In 1910, he and his family acquired property at Vennelslund in Vollen in Asker. He served for a period as a local politician in Asker. He was a member of the district council and executive committee from 1923 to 1928 and deputy mayor from 1923 to 1925. He died in Asker in 1950.

== Other sources ==
- Bjork, Kenneth (1947) Saga in Steel and Concrete – Norwegian Engineers in America ( Northfield, MN: Norwegian-American Historical Association) ISBN 9781406768299
- Fenske, Gail (2008) The Skyscraper and the City: The Woolworth Building and the Making of Modern New York (Chicago: University of Chicago Press) ISBN 9780226241418
- Landau, Sarah; Condit, Carl W. (1996). Rise of the New York Skyscraper, 1865–1913. New Haven, CT: Yale University Press. ISBN 978-0-300-07739-1. OCLC 32819286.
