= Peter J. Solomon =

American investment banker (born 1938)

- Born: Peter Jay Solomon; September 17, 1938 (age 87); New York City, US
- Education: Harvard University (BS, MBA)
- Occupation: Businessman
- Known for: Founder of Solomon Partners
- Spouse: Susan B. Rebell (m. 1996)
- Children: 5
- Parent(s): Sidney L. Solomon; Jeannette Rabinowitz

Peter Jay Solomon (born September 17, 1938) is an American investment banker and the founder and chairman of Solomon Partners, one of the country's first independent investment banks. He is also a former New York City Deputy Mayor for Economic Policy and Development.

== Early life and education ==
Solomon was born in Manhattan, New York, on September 17, 1938, to Sidney L. Solomon, the chairman of department store chain Abraham & Straus, and Jeannette (Rabinowitz) Solomon. He attended the Collegiate School on New York's Upper West Side and graduated from Lawrenceville School, a private boarding school in Lawrenceville, New Jersey.

Solomon graduated cum laude from Harvard College in 1960, where he majored in government, and received a Masters of Business Administration from Harvard Business School in 1963.

== Career ==
Solomon began his career in the statistics department of Merrill Lynch in 1958. He joined Lehman Brothers as an associate in the corporate finance department after graduating from business school in 1963. He became a managing director in 1971 and a member of the firm's board of directors in 1976.

He also served as an adjunct professor at Columbia Business School.

=== Government activity ===
In 1978, Solomon was appointed Deputy Mayor for Economic Policy and Development by New York City mayor Edward I. Koch, a position he held until 1980. He was Koch's principal advisor on taxes, ports, energy and private sector employment and commerce.

As Deputy Mayor, Solomon led negotiations to host the 1980 Democratic National Convention. He also encouraged the development of movie and television studios in New York City.

As chairman of the Industrial & Commercial Incentive Board (ICIB), Solomon instituted reform to the real estate tax abatement system, restructuring the system to curb abuses and loopholes, while stimulating private real estate investment. He also served as chairman of New York's Health and Hospital Corporation, managing 17 municipal hospitals.

In 1980, Solomon was appointed Counselor to the United States Treasury Secretary under President Jimmy Carter, where he oversaw the President's auto task force and industrial policy.

In 1981, Solomon returned to Lehman Brothers. He remained at Lehman and its successor, Shearson Lehman, until the end of the decade, becoming vice chairman of the firm, co-chair of the investment banking division and chairman of the merchant banking division.

=== Peter J. Solomon Company ===
Solomon left Lehman in 1989 to found the Peter J. Solomon Company, a boutique financial advisory firm that was one of the first independent investment banks in the country. The company advises public and private companies on mergers and acquisitions, capital structure and restructuring.

The Peter J. Solomon company's clients include Lands' End in its sale to Sears; Zagat, in its sale to Google and Office Depot and Phillips-Van Heusen Corp. (PVH) via multiple acquisitions. While the firm was known for its focus on consumer and media clients, it has expanded into a number of other sectors including energy, infrastructure, power, renewables, media, grocery and restaurants, among others.

In 2016, Natixis, the international investment banking arm of French financial institution Groupe BPCE, acquired a 51% majority stake in the company, which subsequently rebranded as PJ SOLOMON in 2019 and Solomon Partners in 2021.

=== Cuomo Administration ===
In 2013, Solomon was appointed as the co-chairman of Governor Cuomo's Tax Reform and Fairness Commission, charged with proposing reforms to the state's tax code. He also served on the Governor's Spending and Government Efficiency Commission, responsible for streamlining New York's agencies and bureaucracy.

== Other activities ==
Solomon is currently a director of Monro, Inc., an automotive service company, of which he was previously the chairman from 1984 to 2007. He is a member of the Natixis International Advisory Network and the US Trust Bank of America Private Bank Advisory Committee. Previously, he served on a number of company boards, including:

- Associated Dry Goods Corporation
- BKF Capital Group, Inc.
- Centennial Cellular Corporation
- Century Communications Corp.
- Culbro Corporation
- Edison Brothers Stores, Inc.
- Esquire, Inc.
- Handyman Corporation
- Lawfin International Limited
- LIN Broadcasting Corporation
- The Miller-Wohl Company
- Office Depot, Inc.
- Phillips-Van Heusen Corporation
- The Stop & Shop Companies, Inc.
- Zagat Survey LLC

== Personal life ==
Solomon is married to the former Susan Rebell. They have five children and twelve grandchildren.

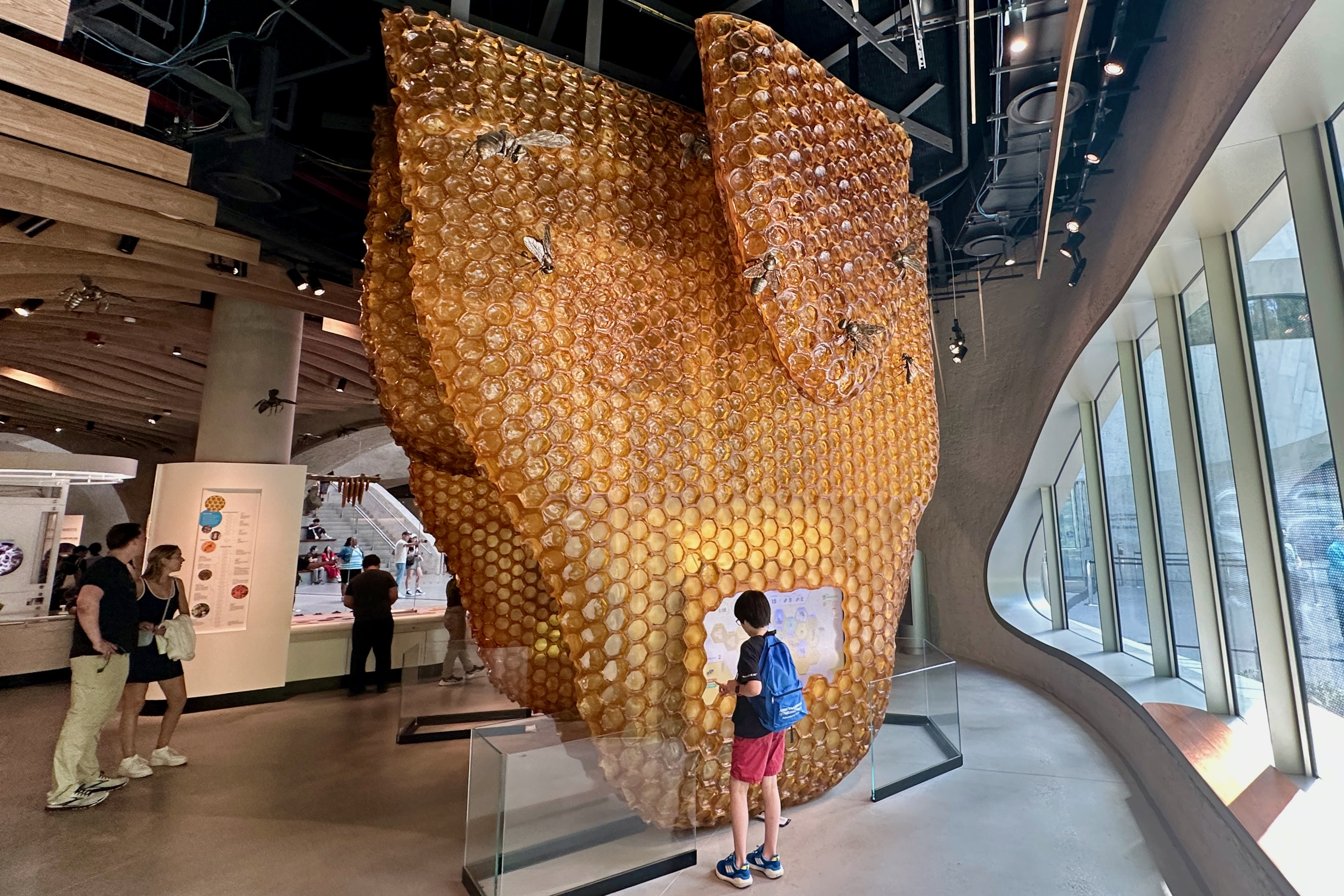
Beehive model at the Richard Gilder Center

He is an experienced beekeeper and donated a large gift to build an insectarium bearing his name at the American Museum of Natural History. The Susan and Peter J. Solomon Family Insectarium at the American Museum of Natural History opened in May 2023 in the Museum's Richard Gilder Center for Science, Education, and Innovation. The Insectarium is a new gallery devoted to Earth's most diverse animal group with 18 live species of insects and features a large-scale, interactive model of a beehive.

== Charitable contributions ==
Solomon's personal foundation was established in 1987. He is a board member of the Memorial Sloan-Kettering Cancer Center, Memorial Hospital for Cancer and Allied Diseases and Sloan-Kettering Institute for Cancer Research. He is also a member of the Board of Overseers of Memorial Sloan-Kettering Cancer Center. Solomon is a trustee of the American Museum of Natural History, Co-chair Emeritus with his wife of the American Friends of the Musée d'Orsay, Chairman Emeritus and director of The Manhattan Theatre Club and a trustee of the Lucius N. Littauer Foundation.

At Harvard University, Solomon donated his collection of important children's literature and illustrations to Houghton Library. He and his wife were the primary financial contributors to the renovation of Houghton. In his honor, Harvard built a new Gate to Harvard Yard, naming it the Peter J. Solomon, Class of 1960, Gate. Solomon is Chairman of the Friends of the Center for Jewish Studies at Harvard. He is also a member of the Council on Foreign Relations. Previously, he was an overseer of Harvard University.

Solomon previously served on a number of not-for-profit boards, including:

- Chairman, Hudson Guild Neighborhood House
- Vice Chair, Mt. Sinai Hospital
- Director-at-Large, Montana Land Reliance
- Director, American Rivers
- Director, National Audubon Society
