= Austin, Nichols and Company Warehouse =

- U.S. National Register of Historic Places
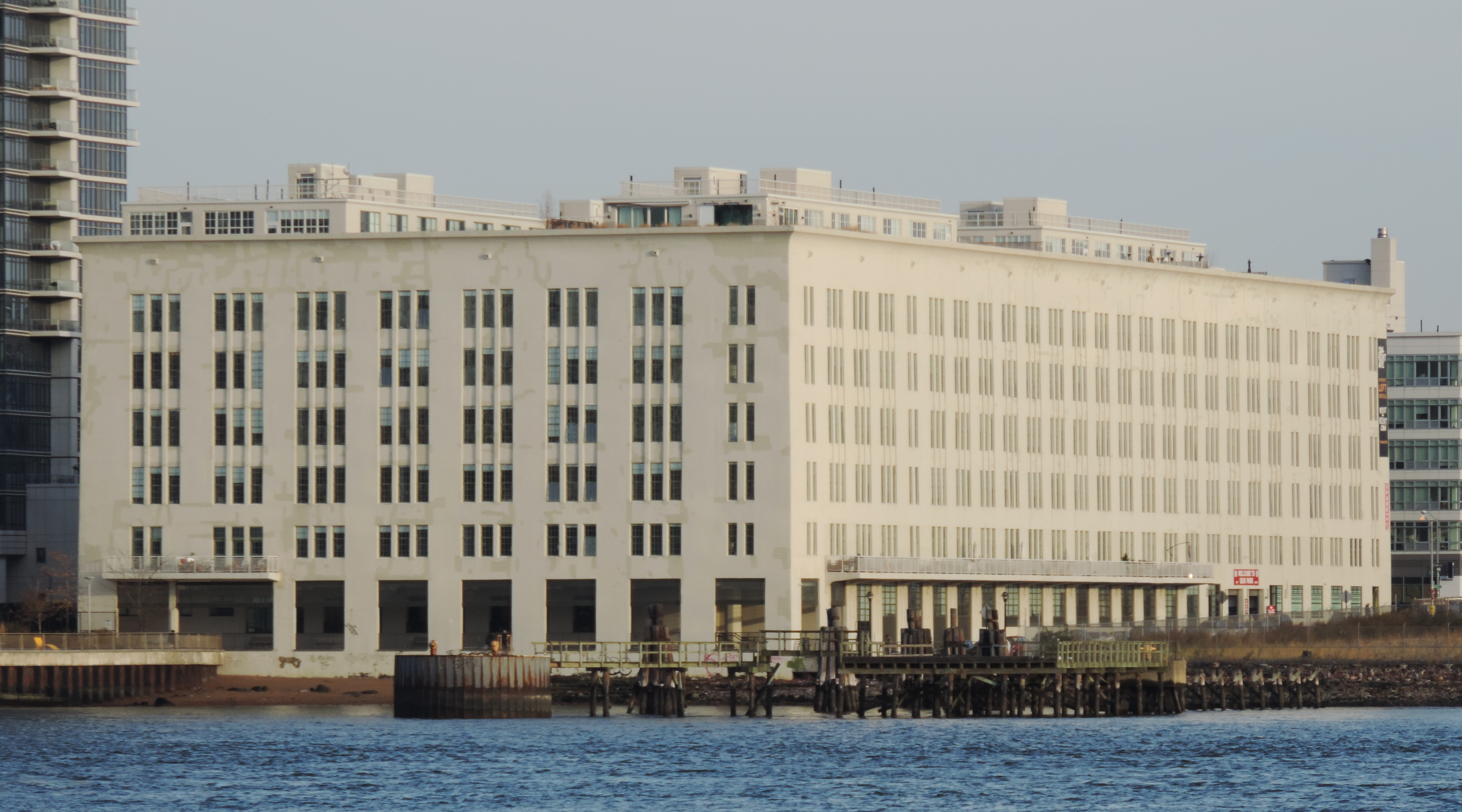
- Location: 184 Kent Ave., Brooklyn, New York 11249
- Coordinates: 40°43′7″N 73°57′51″W
- Area: less than 1 acre (0.40 ha)
- Built: 1915
- Built by: Turner Construction Co.
- Architect: Cass Gilbert
- Engineer: Gunvald Aus
- Architectural style: Late 19th and Early 20th Century American Movements
- NRHP reference No.: 07000629
- Added to NRHP: June 28, 2007

The Austin, Nichols and Company Warehouse, also known as 184 Kent Avenue and Austin Nichols House, is a historic warehouse building on the East River between North 3rd and North 4th Streets in Williamsburg, Brooklyn, New York City. The structure, measuring 179 by 440 feet (55 by 134 m), is one of the city's few structures built in the Egyptian Revival style. The building was designed by architect Cass Gilbert and erected by general contractor Turner Construction with the help of structural engineer Gunvald Aus.

The warehouse was built in 1914–1915 to a design by Gilbert, and was one of several commercial and industrial buildings along the East River waterfront. The land was originally owned by the Havemeyer family, and leased to Austin, Nichols & Company, at one point the world's largest grocery wholesaler. Austin, Nichols & Company occupied 184 Kent Avenue from 1915 until the mid-1950s, after which the structure was occupied by several manufacturers. Starting in the 2000s, the building was used as a residential structure, and a 2010s renovation added residential condominiums.

The warehouse was designated a New York City Landmark in 2005, though the designation was controversial and was overturned by the New York City Council in 2006. The building was listed on the National Register of Historic Places in 2007, a less restrictive designation that allowed for the warehouse's redevelopment into condominiums.

== History ==
=== Context ===
The industrial waterfront of Brooklyn was developed in the 19th century with the construction of major shipping hubs such as Red Hook's Atlantic Basin, the Brooklyn Navy Yard, and Industry City. The village of Williamsburg in northern Brooklyn was incorporated on the bank of the East River in 1827, with much of the commercial enterprises located on the waterfront, and after becoming a part of the city of Brooklyn in 1855, Williamsburg grew quickly. During the late 19th and early 20th centuries, the future warehouse's site was owned by Henry Osborne Havemeyer, founder of Havemeyers & Elder and later the American Sugar Refining Company. The Havemeyer family also operated the Brooklyn Eastern District Terminal and the Domino Sugar Refinery just to the north.

The grocery wholesalers Austin, Nichols & Company, founded in 1879, had moved their headquarters to several increasingly large spaces before erecting a ten-story building on 55-61 Hudson Street in Tribeca, Manhattan. The company also operated eight smaller locations in Manhattan. In June 1912, Austin, Nichols & Company vice president Harry Balfe announced his intention to consolidate all operations in a single building on the Brooklyn waterfront. The consolidated headquarters would save money and allow easier accessibility from the nearby waterfront and rail terminal, as well as from surrounding streets. In April 1913, the company confirmed that it would build a new headquarters.

=== Planning and construction ===
Henry's son Horace Havemeyer commissioned architect Cass Gilbert to design the Austin, Nichols and Company Warehouse. Gilbert's office began the design process in late 1912 or early 1913. At the time of the building's construction, the Real Estate Record and Guide magazine stated that previous warehouses had been designed "exclusively from the point of view of the engineer", so it was unusual to see the plans being prepared by such a renowned architect as Gilbert. There was some urgency in constructing the Brooklyn warehouse, as the Hudson Street building's lease was set to expire in 1914, but nevertheless, Horace insisted that he wanted the building to be of top quality.

Some of the site's preexisting structures had been razed by mid-1913 in preparation for the warehouse's construction. Gunvald Aus was hired as a structural engineer and asked to create separate plans dealing with the building's concrete and steel. Austin, Nichols & Company signed a long-term lease agreement with Havemeyer & Elder in November 1913. The contract stipulated that Havemeyer & Elder would build a factory for Austin, Nichols & Company, who would then be the lessee. The same week, the construction contract was given to Turner Construction. At the time, it was predicted that Austin, Nichols & Company would be the first of several wholesale companies to relocate to Williamsburg.

The Brooklyn Bureau of Buildings received the plans for the Austin, Nichols and Company Warehouse in January 1914 and approved them that April. Concrete construction started in March 1914, and peaked that June with 672 men employed in the construction process. By September, the building structure was essentially completed. The first operations at the Austin, Nichols & Company warehouse started in January 1915, immediately following the expiration of the Hudson Street building's lease, and the company had completed its relocation to its new headquarters by March. Shortly afterward, contracts were awarded for the construction of a pier on the waterfront. Engineering News reported that "the remarkable progress made in its construction is indicative of what can be done in reinforced concrete with proper organization and supervision."

=== Use as warehouse ===
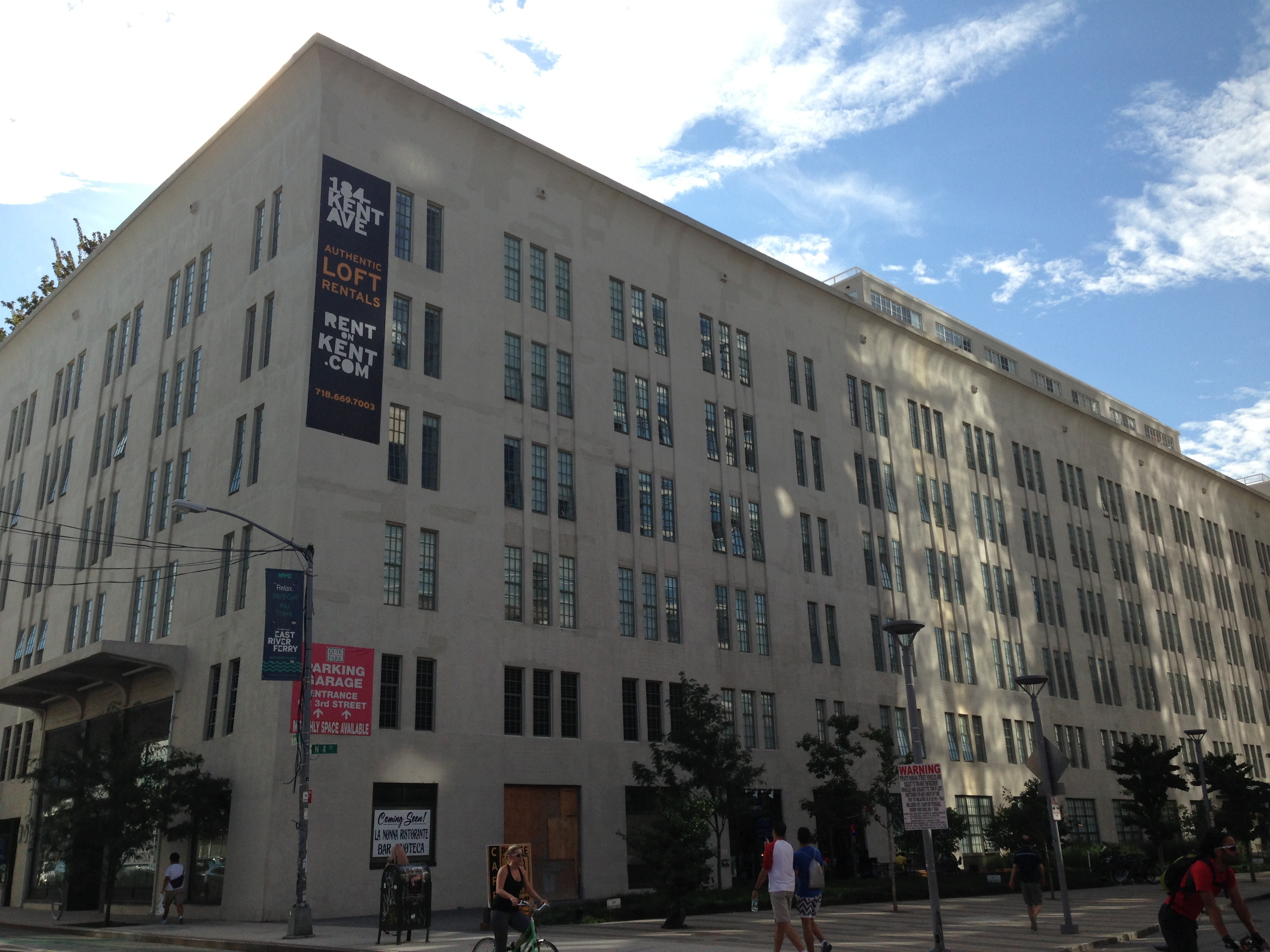
North 4th Street side

Austin, Nichols & Company continued to grow, with an annual sales income of $40 million by 1920. Its chief activity was the production and export of foods under the Sunbeam Foods brand. At its peak, the company was among the world's largest wholesale grocers. In 1923 Austin, Nichols & Company acquired the large wholesale department of Acker, Merril & Condict. The Federal Trade Commission sued Austin, Nichols & Company, alleging that the acquisition would result in a monopoly, but later dropped the charges. By the mid-1920s, Austin, Nichols & Company suffered from decreasing sales, due to either the lawsuit or to the rise of chain stores. The company had closed its other locations by the late 1920s, selling off its packing subsidiary as well.

After Austin, Nichols & Company's other locations closed, the Williamsburg warehouse was used solely for importing and manufacturing products for the company. Starting in the 1930s, after Prohibition in the United States was repealed, the company started handling liquor. Austin, Nichols & Company's lease was renewed in 1934, and a distillery was subsequently installed. After the company's grocery business was sold to Francis H. Leggett & Co. in 1938 or 1939, the company's focus turned exclusively to liquor sales.

The Lehigh Warehouse and Transportation Company leased three floors of the building in 1939, but Austin, Nichols & Company continued to occupy the building through the 1950s. Austin, Nichols & Company bought a new structure in Maspeth, Queens, in 1955 and subsequently moved all of their operations there. The warehouse, now known as 184 Kent Avenue, continued to be used by small manufacturers for the next three decades, until 184 Kent Avenue Associates bought the building in 1986. However, by the 1990s, the warehouse was dilapidated. In 1999, the New York City Board of Standards and Appeals granted a variance to allow the renovation of the interior for residential use.

=== Conversion to residential building ===
The family of businessman Louis Kestenbaum paid $4 million for 184 Kent Avenue in 2000, with Kestenbaum using part of the building for his company and leasing the remainder. The Kestenbaums rented the building out as studio apartments. The New York City Landmarks Preservation Commission (LPC) designated 184 Kent Avenue as an official city landmark in September 2005. Twenty-seven people and organizations spoke in favor of landmark designation at the LPC's public hearing on the matter, but the Kestenbaums and New York City Council member David Yassky opposed it. The Kestenbaums, who called the structure an "eyesore", wanted to demolish or significantly modify the building's exterior to create new rental apartments. In November 2005, a majority of City Council members voted to overturn the landmark designation, a rare move, as such revocations had occurred only four times in the previous fourteen years. Council member Simcha Felder said, "This is a piece of trash. We should knock it down and put something nice up." Yassky said that "it's a nondescript white box of a building" that was similar to many other structures on the waterfront. Mayor Michael Bloomberg vetoed the vote in December 2005, but the City Council voted to override his veto. Yassky claimed that Bloomberg had only vetoed the council's decision to "curry favor with preservationists", following the LPC's refusal to consider designating 2 Columbus Circle as a landmark the same year.

The renters were evicted in 2006. Early the same year, shortly after the City Council vote, the Kestenbaums sold 184 Kent Avenue to Jason Halpern's JMH Development. Halpern successfully advocated to get the structure listed on the National Register of Historic Places, which did not restrict the future use of the building as much as a New York City landmark status did. JMH's plans called for the preservation of the exterior, and in December 2008, the company announced that 184 Kent's exterior would be preserved in perpetuity. JMH Development completed the conversion of 184 Kent Avenue into 338 rental apartments in 2010. A for-profit nursery school leased space in the building the next year.

The rap lyrics annotation website Genius (formerly Rap Genius) was headquartered at 184 Kent.

Kushner Companies, LIVWRK and Rockpoint Group bought the property in April 2016, intending to turn the rental units into condominium units. Morris Adjmi Architects led the redesign. The former warehouse was rebranded the "Austin Nichols House" and sales in the building began in 2016. There were several controversies involving 184 Kent Avenue following its conversion to luxury apartments. In 2016, several fires of unexplained origin were started at the building, though no one was injured. Another controversy involved an alleged infestation of rodents. A 2018 lawsuit alleged that Kushner Companies imposed hazardous conditions or otherwise harassed the building's rent-regulated residents in an attempt to get these tenants to move away. Records showed that when Kushner Companies had bought the building in 2015, it had 316 rent-regulated tenants, a number that had declined to 71 when the lawsuit was filed three years later. In mid-2021, Rockpoint and Kushner sold the retail condominium to Regal Acquisitions for $11.7 million. The retail condo included 16,000 ft^{2} (1,500 m^{2}) of storefronts and a 55,000 ft^{2} (5,100 m^{2}), three-level parking garage.

== Architecture ==
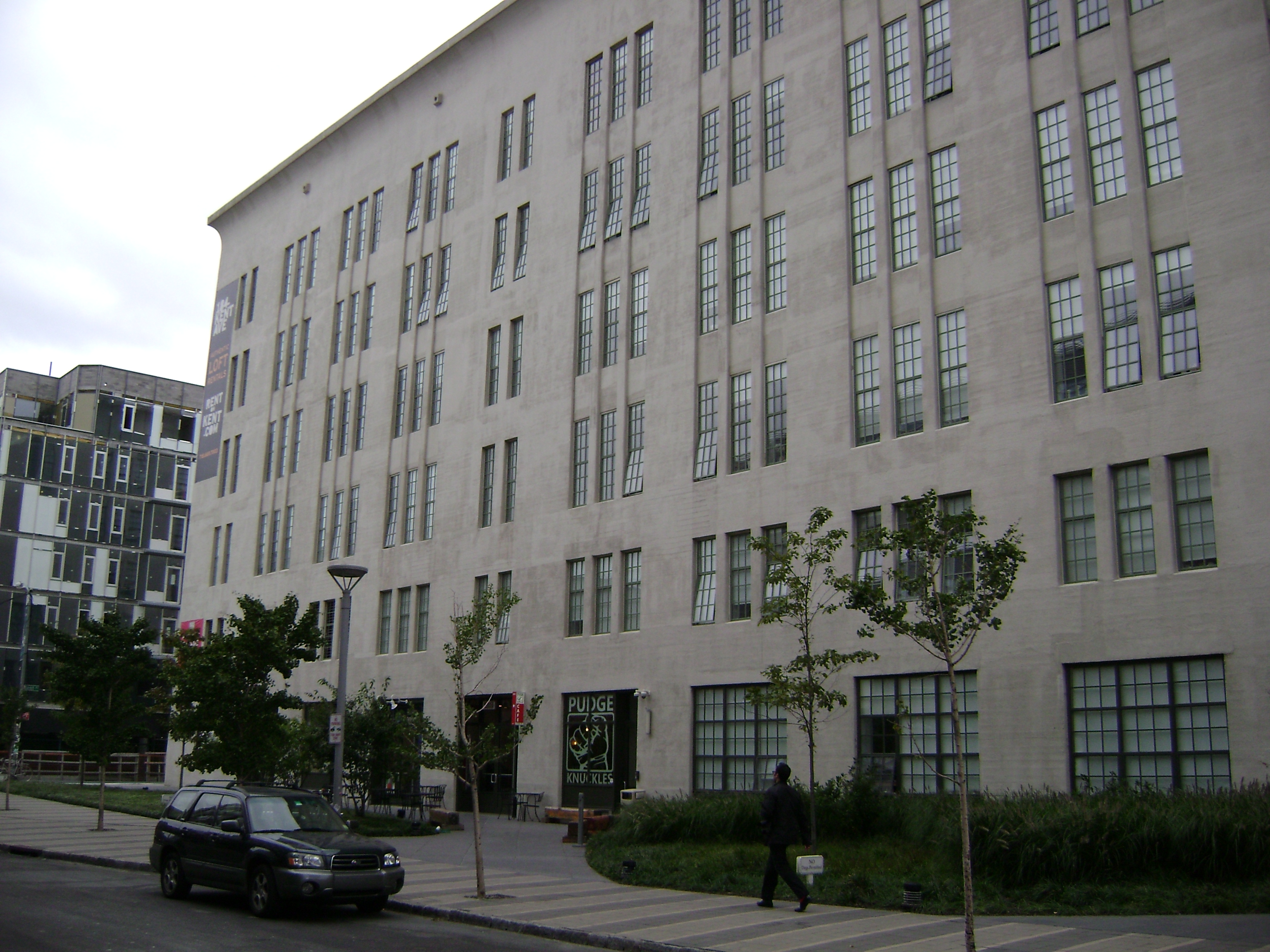
Seen from North 4th Street, facing east toward Kent Avenue

The Austin, Nichols and Company Warehouse was among the earlier buildings to use reinforced concrete on a huge scale. The building measures 179 by 440 feet (55 by 134 m) and takes up a lot bounded by Kent Avenue on the east, North 3rd Street on the south, the East River on the west, and North 4th Street on the north. The facade rises to a height of 80 feet (24 m) on Kent Avenue and 92 feet (28 m) on the river, and the building is located on a lot of about 78,800 square feet (7,320 m^{2}). The interior contains 425,000 square feet (39,500 m^{2}) of floor area.

The structure, built in the Egyptian Revival style, is one of the city's only Egyptian Revival buildings. Its primary construction material is reinforced concrete. Gilbert used the material to increase the building's maximum load weight and to make the structure fireproof.

=== Facade ===
The reinforced concrete facade is relatively simplistic and painted in shades of white. The facade is divided into numerous architectural bays, which generally contain groupings of three narrow, slightly recessed windows on each floor. The western facade is divided into eight bays, all of which contain 3 windows on each floor, except for the southernmost bay, which only contains 2 windows. The eastern facade is divided into nine bays; the northernmost and southernmost bays contain 2 windows while the remaining seven bays contain 3 windows. A similar pattern can be found on the longer northern and southern facades, where most of the bays contain 3 windows, while the end bays and two of the center bays contain 2 windows. Loading docks, now sealed, were located on the western, northern, and southern facades.

Little ornamentation was used on the facade. A concrete marquee was located along the western half of the southern facade, above the loading docks. Other features of the facade included a concrete cornice at the top of the building, as well as inward-sloping walls and long uninterrupted wall sections. In a letter to Gilbert dated April 3, 1913, Turner Construction wrote that "Concrete, for grocery warehouses, has become almost the standard form of construction throughout the century." Gilbert later said, "The nature of the materials dictates the form of all its parts, and assuming that the purpose of the structure is kept in mind, as it should be, this purpose is necessarily expressed in very simple terms."

Gilbert chose to place emphasis on the scale of the building's dimensions, saying that a building's "principal claim to beauty" was derived from its proportion instead of its decoration. Havemeyer had originally asked Gilbert to design the western facade on the riverfront so that it would appear as massive as possible. While the initial proposals featured three different variants of window fenestration, the final plans simplified the design to the extent that the facades were all nearly identical. To save money, the windows' recessions were reduced in depth, but Havemeyer agreed to add rounded mullions between the two or three window panes in each bay. This serves to unite the "various levels of fenestration" on the building.

=== Features ===
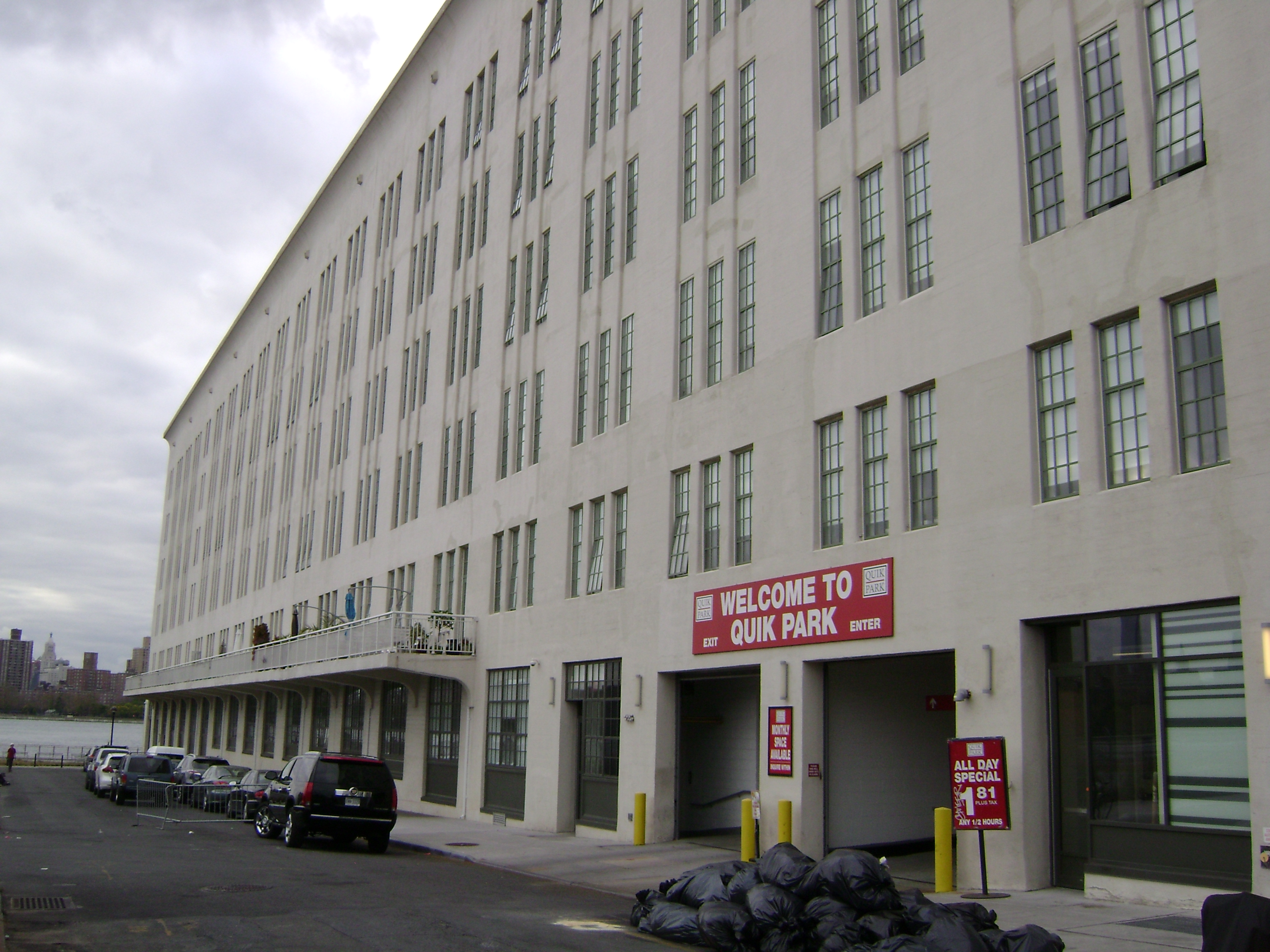
North 3rd Street facade, looking west toward the East River

Upon its completion, the Austin, Nichols and Company Warehouse included four tracks with 68 freight cars, a freight-loading system with several large derricks, and a telegraph service to instantly duplicate orders that were made in the Manhattan sales building. Loading bridges took railcars from car floats, unpowered barges with rail tracks on them. The building was used to process various foodstuffs, import European groceries, as well as manufacture and export dry goods. Material was carried through the factory via a system of chutes, conveyors, and pneumatic tubes. Upon the building's completion in 1915, the Brooklyn Daily Eagle stated that the facilities could accommodate 100 freight cars or 400 lighters a day, and that the number of required freight trucks had been cut from 100 to 35 per day. The warehouse employed 1,500 workers and nearly all of the floor space was being used.

Each floor was designed for a different purpose. The basement contained storage rooms for fish and olives, as well as an engine room, while the first floor contained administrative offices and the receiving and shipping divisions. Restrooms, as well as a restaurant and lockers for employees, were located in the mezzanine. The second floor included the exports and olive departments; storage and processing of dry foods, fruit, and canned foods; and the laundry room. The third floor contained the departments of extract & syrups, dried fruit, and small-scale coffee packing. The fourth floor contained more dry food/ingredient storage and large-scale coffee packing. The fifth floor contained storage of dry foods and other non-food products, as well as administrative offices and another employee restaurant. The sixth floor was used for roasting and storing coffee, as well as cutting and grinding spices.

184 Kent Avenue, now a residential building, contains a green wall in its lobby. The interior includes 338 luxury condominium apartments, which range from studio apartments to three-bedroom suites. There is also 17,850 square feet (1,658 m^{2}) of rentable commercial space on the first floor. A cafe area and enclosed courtyard are located within the building. Other residential amenities include a musicians' room, a movie room, a riverfront gym, a children's play space, and shared rooftop space.

== Impact ==
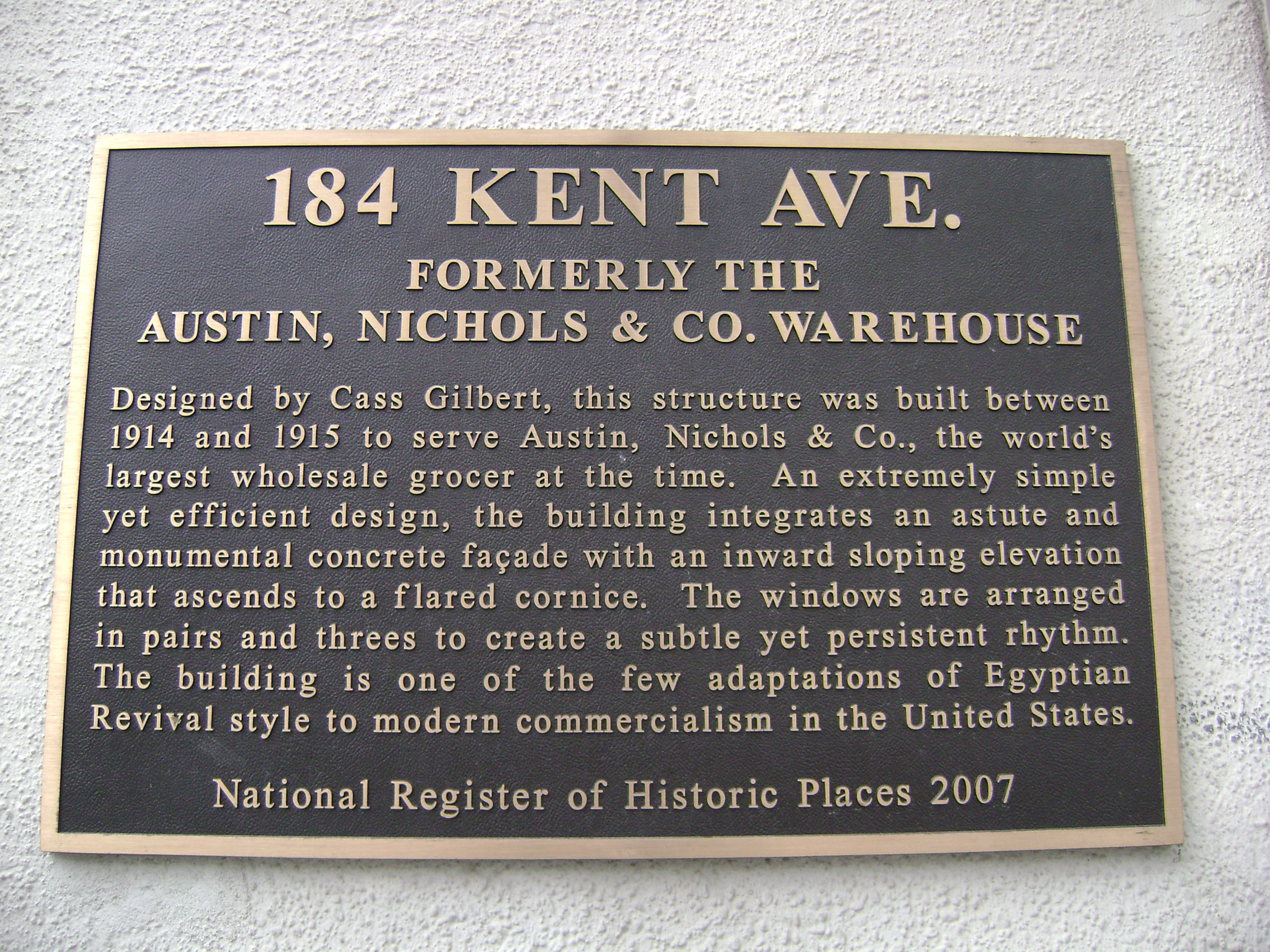
National Register of Historic Places plaque

In September 1914, Austin, Nichols & Company vice president Balfe said "The work of the architects, contractors and all connected with it, has in our opinion simply been wonderful." Likewise, an anonymous writer in the Engineering News stated in November 1914 that the warehouse is "a good example of a modern reinforced-concrete building of the concrete type" and that Gilbert's design was "somewhat unique". When the plant was finished in March 1915, the Brooklyn Daily Eagle wrote a sub-headline declaring that the building was a "Model of Modern Construction and Efficiency". In 1921, as reinforced concrete structures were becoming more popular, Arthur S. McEntee wrote in Architecture magazine, "The Austin-Nichols Warehouse, Brooklyn, is an excellent example of the modern adaptation of Egyptian architecture to the present-day requirements of commercialism." The similarities of reinforced-concrete buildings to Egyptian design were also observed by European critics such as Le Corbusier and Wilhelm Worringer.

Gilbert went on to design other reinforced-concrete industrial buildings such as the Brooklyn Army Terminal, built in 1919 in Sunset Park, Brooklyn, and the R. C. Williams Warehouse, built in Chelsea, Manhattan, in 1927. The Brooklyn Army Terminal was also built by Turner Construction and involved more complex infrastructure, including its own rail yard. The later Williams Warehouse, built for a competitor of Austin, Nichols & Company, contained its own direct rail connection. Both the Williams Warehouse and the Brooklyn Army Terminal were built with recessed architectural window bays in their facades. In a 1928 drawing, Gilbert cited the Brooklyn Army Terminal and the Austin, Nichols & Company Warehouse as being among his best works.

== See also ==
- National Register of Historic Places listings in Brooklyn
