= R. C. Williams Warehouse =

Historic commercial building in New York, United States

- R.C. Williams Warehouse
- U.S. National Register of Historic Places
- New York State Register of Historic Places
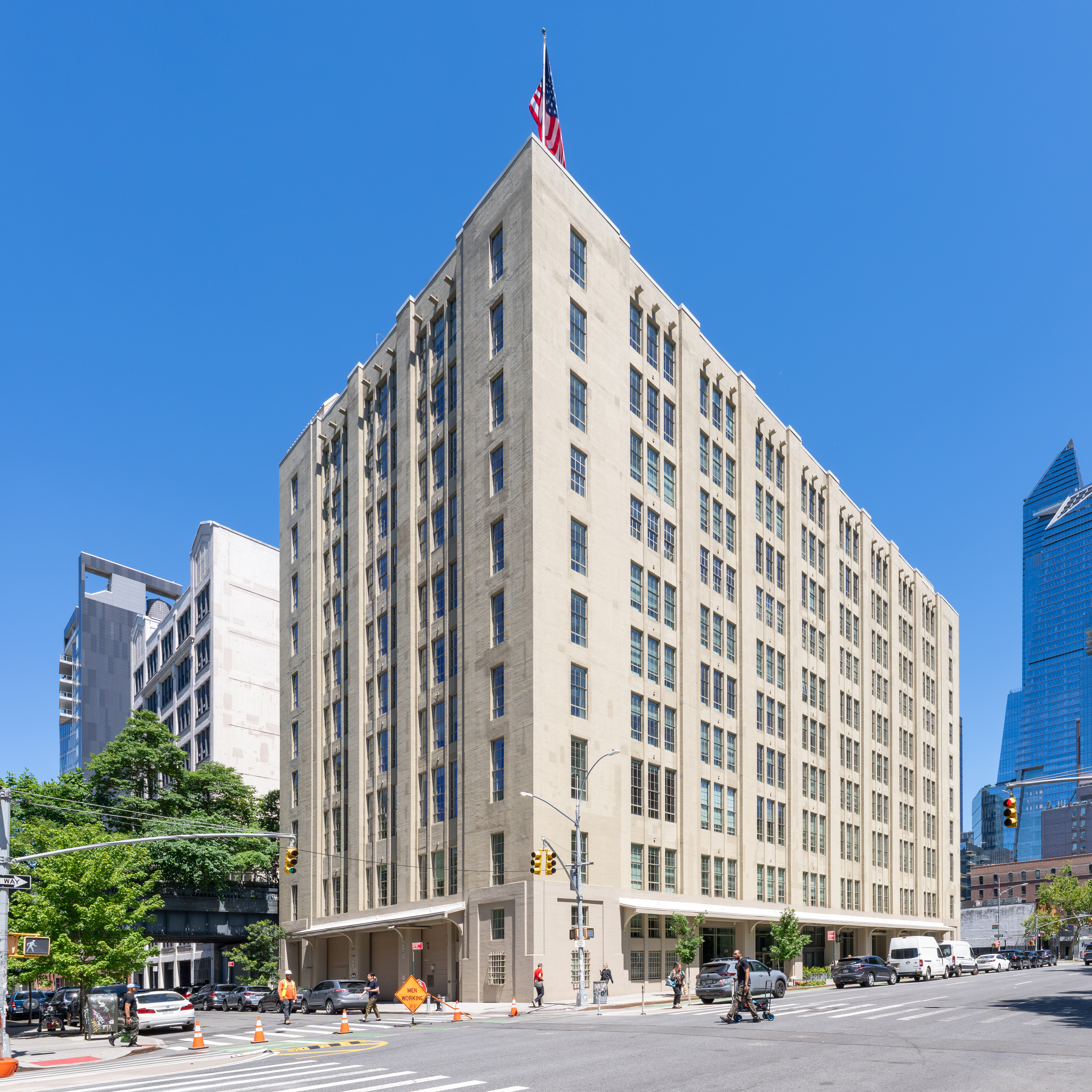
- The building in 2026
- Location: 259-273 Tenth Avenue, New York, New York
- Coordinates: 40°44′58″N 74°0′12″W
- Built: 1927–28
- Architect: Cass Gilbert
- Architectural style: Modern Movement
- NRHP reference No.: 05000086
- NYSRHP No.: 06101.015008

Significant dates
- Added to NRHP: February 24, 2005
- Designated NYSRHP: December 18, 2004

The R.C. Williams Warehouse is a 10-story Modern Movement style building in Chelsea, Manhattan, New York City designed by architect Cass Gilbert. It is located on the west side of 10th Avenue between 25th and 26th Streets and was built in 1927–1928 for a wholesale grocery company, the R.C. Williams Company, which purchased the site for its new headquarters in 1926. The 215,000 square feet (20,000 m^{2}) design is a smaller version of Gilbert's design for the Brooklyn Army Terminal; like the Army Terminal, the warehouse has a concrete façade divided into bays by columns. The building has a siding on the third floor which formerly provided access to the High Line railway for the loading and unloading of freight to the warehouse.

The building was listed on the National Register of Historic Places in 2005. Avenues: The World School, a private school, opened in the building in September 2012.

== See also ==
- National Register of Historic Places listings in Manhattan from 14th to 59th Streets
- Austin, Nichols and Company Warehouse, also designed by Cass Gilbert, in Williamsburg, Brooklyn
- Brooklyn Army Terminal, also designed by Cass Gilbert, in Sunset Park, Brooklyn
