= Brooklyn Army Terminal =

Historic warehouse complex in Brooklyn, New York

- U.S. Army Military Ocean Terminal
- U.S. National Register of Historic Places
- New York State Register of Historic Places
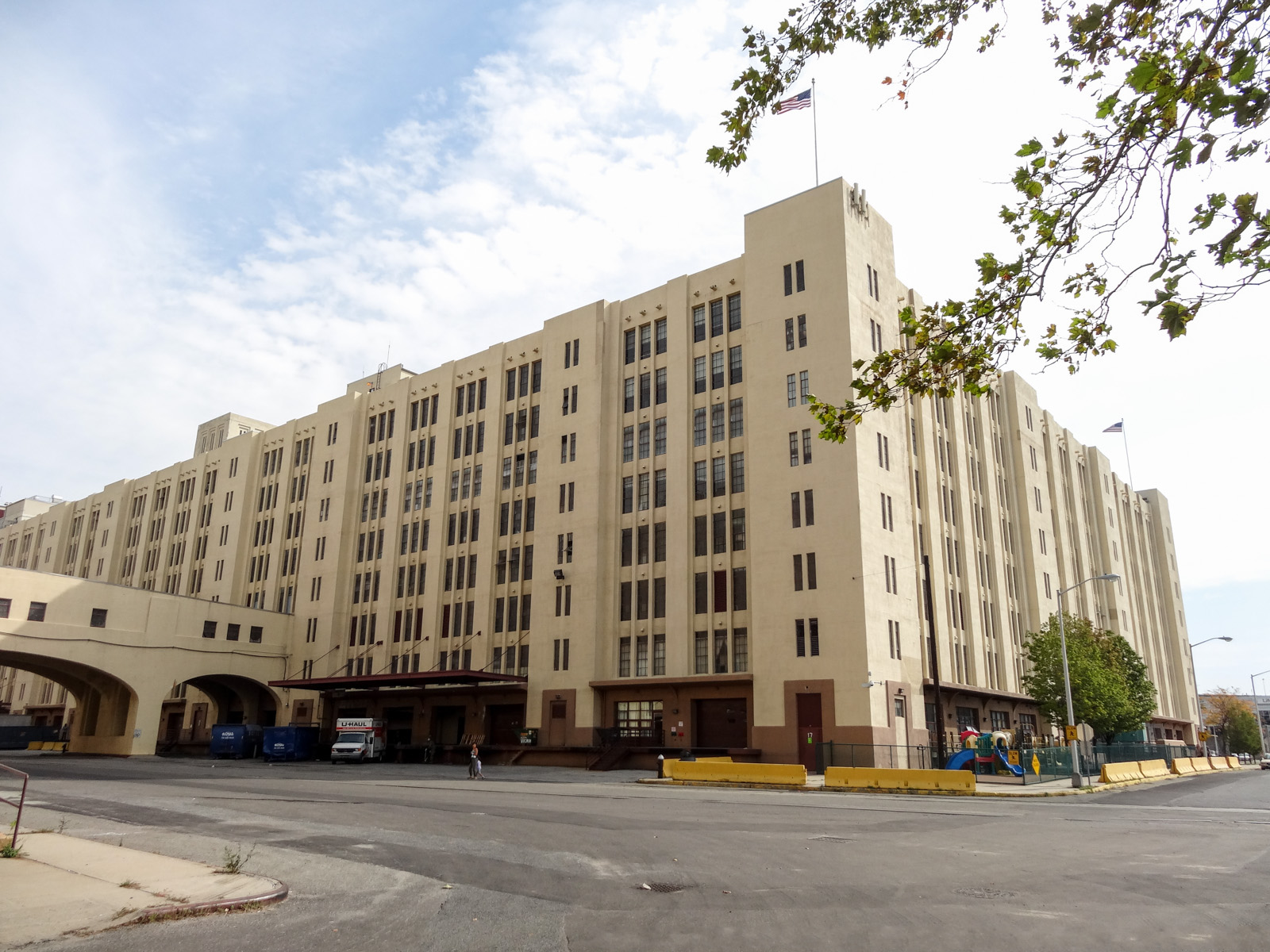
- Side view

- Location within New York City Location within New York Location within the United States
- Location: 58th–65th St. and 2nd Ave., Brooklyn, New York
- Coordinates: 40°38′40″N 74°1′30″W
- Area: 97.2 acres (39.3 ha)
- Built: 1918–19
- Architect: Cass Gilbert
- Architectural style: Industrial
- NRHP reference No.: 83001702

Significant dates
- Added to NRHP: September 23, 1983
- Designated NYSRHP: August 11, 1983

The Brooklyn Army Terminal (BAT) is a large warehouse complex in Sunset Park, Brooklyn, New York City. The site occupies more than 95 acres (38 ha) between 58th and 63rd Streets west of 2nd Avenue, on Brooklyn's western shore. The complex was originally used as a United States Army Supply Terminal called the Brooklyn Army Base or Brooklyn Army Supply Base. Subsequently converted for commercial and light industrial purposes, it also includes a ferry stop. The complex was listed on the National Register of Historic Places in 1983.

The Brooklyn Army Terminal was designed by Cass Gilbert. It contains two warehouses, three piers, several smaller administrative buildings, and rail sidings for loading cargo. When built, the warehouses were among the world's largest concrete structures. The Brooklyn Army Terminal adjoins the former Bush Terminal, which was used by the United States Navy.

The Brooklyn Army Terminal's construction was originally approved in 1918, during World War I, and was completed the following year after the conclusion of the war. The terminal was subsequently leased out and used for various purposes, including as a dock, a military prison, and a storage space for drugs and alcohol during Prohibition. During World War II, the terminal was the United States' largest military supply base. The United States Army stopped using the Brooklyn Army Terminal in 1967, and the terminal was briefly used by the United States Postal Service and the Navy. The New York City government purchased the terminal in 1981; since then, the Brooklyn Army Terminal has undergone a series of renovations to make it suitable for commercial and light industrial use.

== Description ==
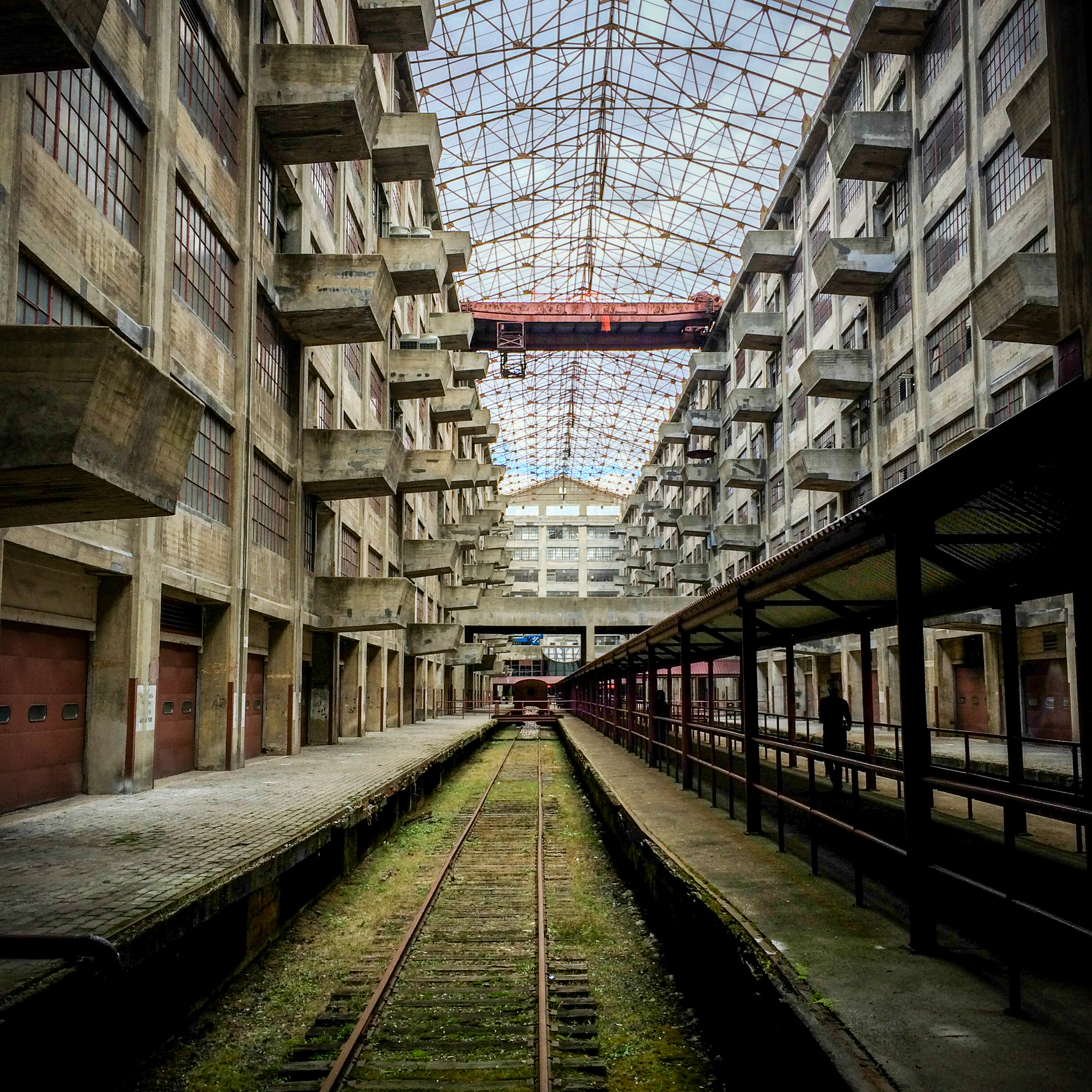
Abandoned railroad tracks inside building B's atrium

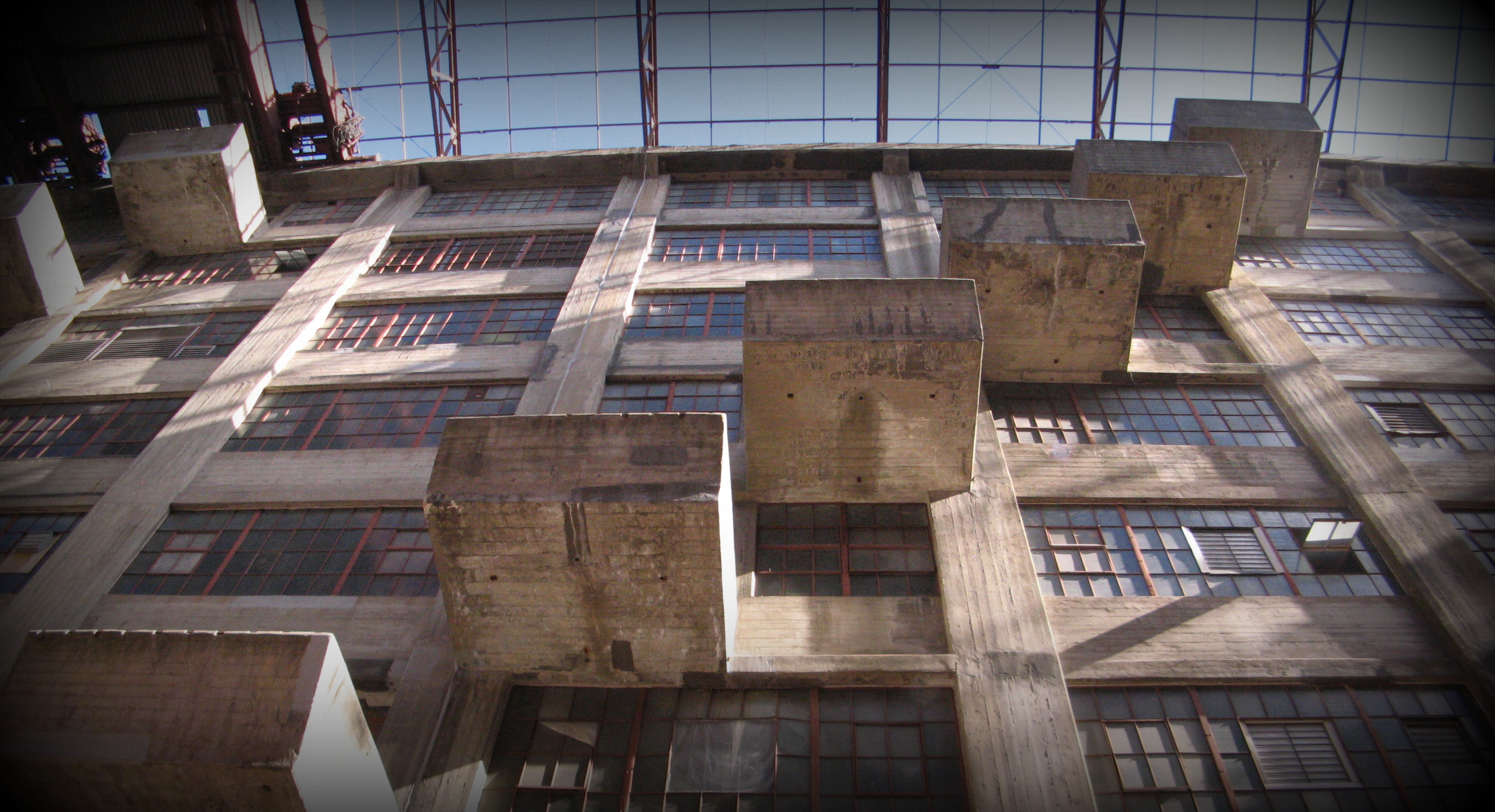
Close-up of staggered balconies inside the atrium

The Brooklyn Army Terminal covers about 97 acres (39 ha). It includes two 8-story warehouses, three 2-story piers, several ancillary buildings, and a train storage yard with capacity for 2,200 cars.

Warehouses A and B are located west of Second Avenue between 59th and 65th Streets, with warehouse A being located to the west of warehouse B. Warehouse A had a footprint of 200 by 980 feet (61 by 299 m), while warehouse B measured 306 by 980 feet (93 by 299 m). The 980-foot-long sides of each structure run between 58th Street on the north and 63rd Street on the south. Warehouse B was the world's largest building by floor area when it was completed. Warehouse B contains a central atrium with two railroad tracks, both of which are disused and overgrown, and there are two old train cars permanently parked on the western track of the atrium. The loading balconies in the atrium of warehouse B are staggered diagonally, and a 5-short-ton (4.46-long-ton; 4.54-metric-ton) overhead movable crane moved cargo between the balconies. Buildings A and B are operated by the New York City government as light manufacturing space. The former administration building was remade into a food-manufacturing complex in 2017.

An 8-story administration building measuring 60 by 260 feet (18 by 79 m) was located north of warehouse A. The warehouses and piers were connected to each other by footbridges on the third floors of each building. A footbridge also separates the former administration building from the two warehouses. There was also a power house, boiler room, and ash room. Each of the piers measured 1,300 feet (400 m) long; one of the piers was 130 feet (40 m) wide while the other two piers measured 130 feet (40 m) wide. The piers were double-decked. 58th Street, on the Brooklyn Army Terminal's northern side, separates the Army Terminal from Bush Terminal, which contains warehouses formerly used by the United States Navy.

Three railroad tracks ran between the warehouses. The railroad tracks connected to four car floats and a large rail yard along the western shore of Bay Ridge, to the south of Brooklyn Army Terminal. The tracks also link to the Long Island Rail Road's Bay Ridge Branch and then to the New York Connecting Railroad, which provides a railroad connection to the rest of the continental United States. The Brooklyn Army Terminal had over 13 miles (21 km) of tracks at its peak. Although much of the trackage was abandoned by the 1970s, including the freight yards south of the terminal, a direct track connection from the Brooklyn Army Terminal to the Bay Ridge Branch was established in 1973. Some of the tracks are still used by New York New Jersey Rail (formerly New York Cross Harbor Railroad) to carry freight along the Sunset Park shorefront. To the north, the tracks connected to Bush Terminal.

== History ==
=== Construction ===
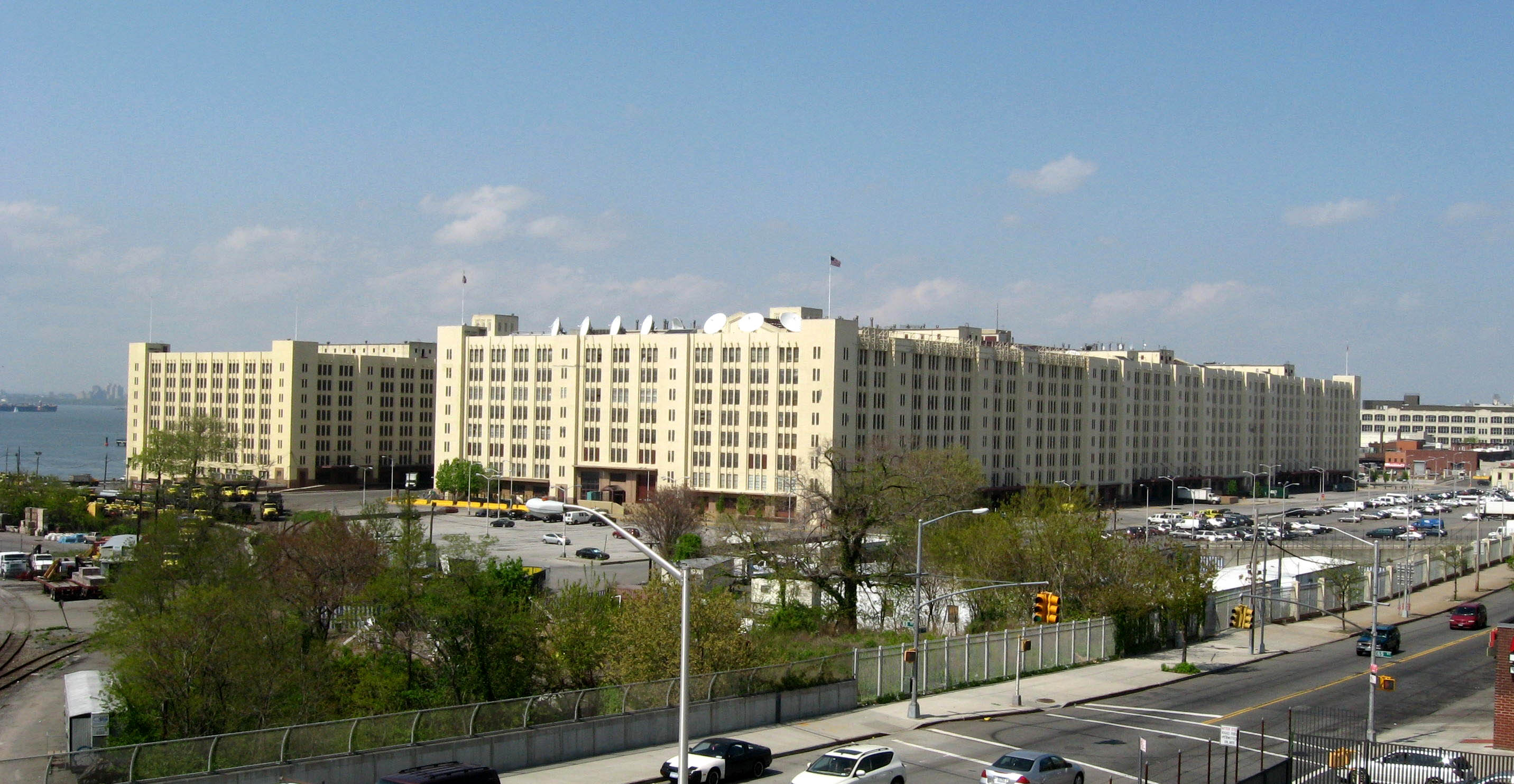
Seen from the Gowanus Expressway ramp

The complex was also known as the U.S. Army Military Ocean Terminal and the Brooklyn Army Base, and was built as part of the New York Port of Embarkation. The Brooklyn Army Base was one of six United States Army terminals whose construction was approved by United States Congress on May 6, 1918, to accommodate Army activity during World War I.

The base was designed by Cass Gilbert, though Irving T. Bush, who operated the adjacent Bush Terminal to the north, also helped design the complex. Construction started on May 15, 1918. The city set aside $40 million for the completion of the complex. Six thousand workers, employed by Turner Construction, helped build the Brooklyn Army Base. The scope of construction was so large that an additional train was added to subway timetables to transport workers from Manhattan to the future Army Base, and prospective workers would line up outside the construction site every morning. Several smaller contractors also helped build the complex.

To save money and to reduce the use of steel, the structures were built out of reinforced poured in place concrete using wooden forms. The concrete floors were designed to support loads of 500 pounds per square foot (2,400 kg/m^{2}). The construction process used 7 million linear feet (2,100,000 m) of wood. The Brooklyn Army Terminal was the world's largest concrete building complex at the time of construction. Ultimately, the government spent $32 million on the terminal's construction.

=== Military use ===
The Brooklyn Army Base was completed in September 1919. The base was able to accommodate 1,500 short tons (1,300 long tons; 1,400 metric tons) of outgoing freight per hour as well as 500,000 short tons (446,428.57 long tons; 453,592.37 t) of freight storage. As World War I had already ended, this full capacity was not used for some time. However, the Brooklyn Army Base was also designed for light industrial use so that it could be used as a civilian facility after the war ended. As such, in 1920, the federal government began advertising five-year leases for parts of the base. The complex had a combined 4,680,000 square feet (435,000 m^{2}) devoted to storage, which could support loads of up to 450,000 short tons (400,000 long tons; 410,000 t). The next year, a law passed by Congress gave the United States Shipping Board access to all piers that the Army was not using. In 1923, the federal government paid $2.4 million to the estate of William C. Langley, whose plot between 61st and 63rd Streets had been seized five years earlier to make way for the Brooklyn Army Base. The same year, the Shipping Board started leasing piers 3 and 4 to private commercial tenants. The Atlantic Tidewater Terminal signed two 5-year leases for the upper floors of the warehouses, using them for storage. Under this arrangement, transatlantic liners were able to dock at the Brooklyn Army Base's piers.

Starting in 1920, during Prohibition, two vaults on warehouse A's third and sixth floors were used to stock illicit alcoholic beverages, as well as narcotics. The Army installed an incinerator in 1926 so it could destroy confiscated drinks. In 1929, after a series of thefts, the U.S. Army constructed a heavily fortified vault on the seventh floor of warehouse A. Described by the Brooklyn Daily Eagle as the "largest vault built anywhere for the storage of dangerous drugs", the room measured several hundred feet in each direction. The Army also had a lab where it was able to test the chemical makeup of appropriated alcohol. Beverages deemed suitable for future medicinal use were retained, and the rest were dumped into New York Harbor. The lab was closed in 1933 after the end of Prohibition.

An experimental barracks for transient service members was opened at Brooklyn Army Terminal in 1928. The barracks could accommodate 500 residents, and was designed for service members who were on leave or were awaiting discharge or transfer. By the next year, civic leaders were suggesting that the Port Authority of New York and New Jersey take over the operations of the piers at Brooklyn Army Base. However, the base commander denied all rumors that the base would be abandoned or sold off.

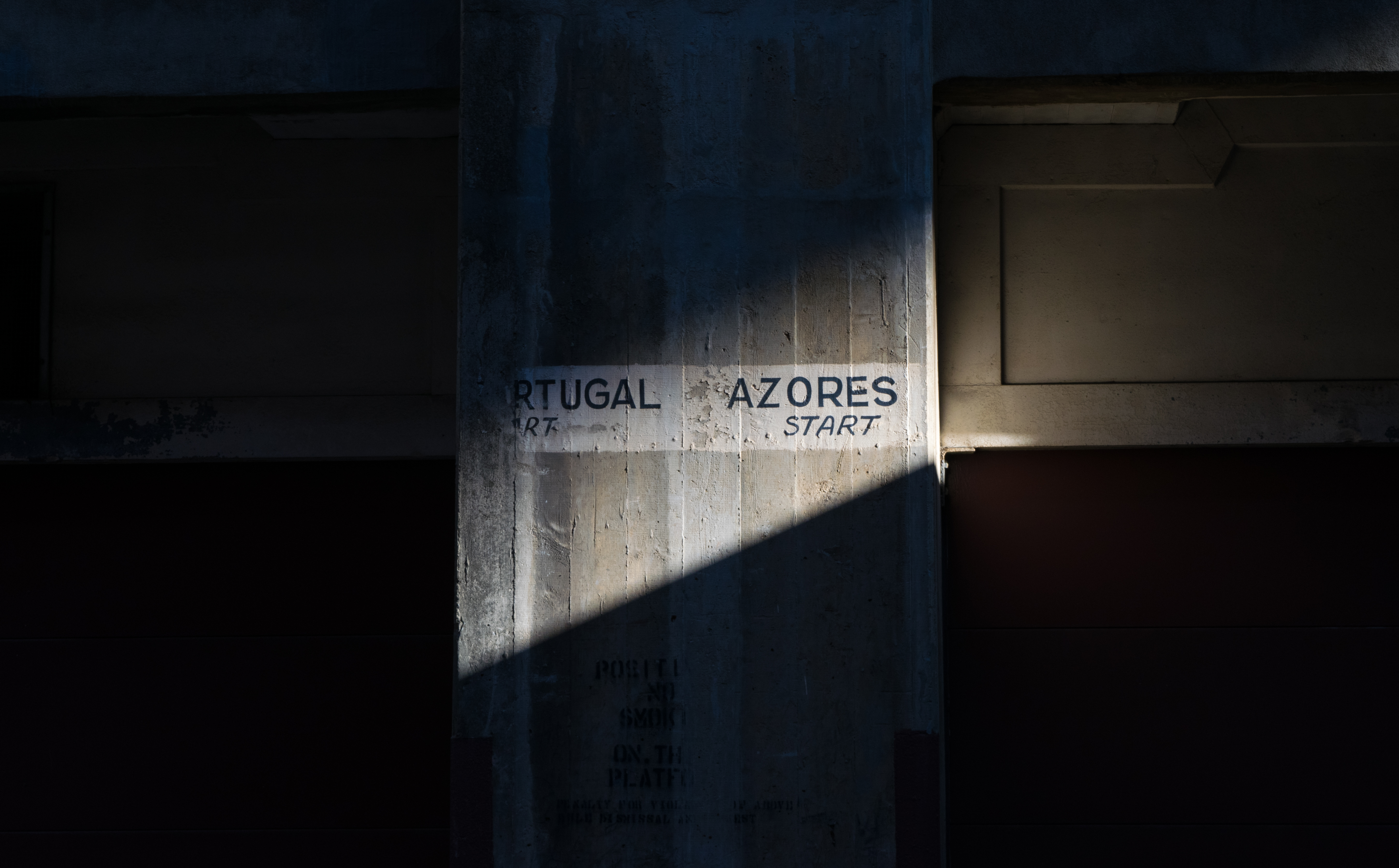
The terminal was a base for shipping to many regions during World War II, including mainland Portugal and the Azores.

In March 1930, officials announced that they would construct a military prison with a 125-prisoner capacity at Brooklyn Army Base. The prison, which would be one of three Army prisons in the United States, would house deserters and servicemembers convicted of high crimes. Community members objected to the prison, stating that there had been no prior consultation with the community. Despite protests, the government decided to proceed with plans for the prison.

The Brooklyn Army Terminal was the largest military supply base in the United States through World War II. The complex had its own railroad line as well as dedicated police and fire departments. According to contemporary news articles, the Brooklyn Army Base saw 43,000,000 short tons (38,392,857.14 long tons; 39,008,943.82 metric tons) of cargo and was the point of departure for 3.5 million soldiers during World War II, though the Brooklyn Army Terminal's website states that the Brooklyn Army Base handled 37,000,000 short tons (33,035,714.29 long tons; 33,565,835.38 metric tons) of cargo and 3.2 million soldiers. The terminal employed 20,000 workers and served as the headquarters for the New York Port of Embarkation. In mid-1941, the U.S. Army moved some civilian workers into more than 500,000 square feet (46,000 m^{2}) at Bush Terminal, spread across three buildings along First Avenue, because there was no more space at Brooklyn Army Terminal.

A rigorous safety program, enacted after the war, resulted in an 85% decrease in industrial accidents at Brooklyn Army Terminal. The base was among the safest ports of embarkation in the United States, with an average of 0.194 accidents in marine transport operations occurring per 1,000,000 man-hours; by 1947, the port had only three incidents in two years. In the aftermath of World War II, the Brooklyn Army Base received the bodies of several thousand soldiers who had died while fighting the war. The first boat carrying American World War II casualties back to the United States arrived in San Francisco in October 1947, whereupon the bodies were transported cross-country to Brooklyn Army Base. A ship carrying 4,212 soldiers' bodies traveled directly to the Brooklyn Army Terminal the next month. By July 1948, the base was receiving 18,500 soldiers' bodies within a span of two weeks.

In the years after World War II ended, the Brooklyn Army Base was the port of arrival or departure for 200,000 soldiers per year. As per custom, the 328th Army Band would play every time troops arrived or departed from the base. During the late 1950s, the base received Hungarian Revolution refugees, as well as victims of a 1956 crash between the SS Andrea Doria and the MS Stockholm. In 1958, Private Elvis Presley sailed from Brooklyn Army Base to Germany alongside 1,170 other soldiers in the 3rd Armored Division. By 1963, the Brooklyn Army Terminal employed 1,800 civilians and over 200 military personnel, and another 1,600 people lived at the terminal. At that point, the terminal received 4,500 short tons (4,000 long tons; 4,100 metric tons) of cargo every day from trucking operations, and another 2,500 short tons (2,232.14 long tons; 2,267.96 t) daily from rail operations.

=== Closure of military base ===
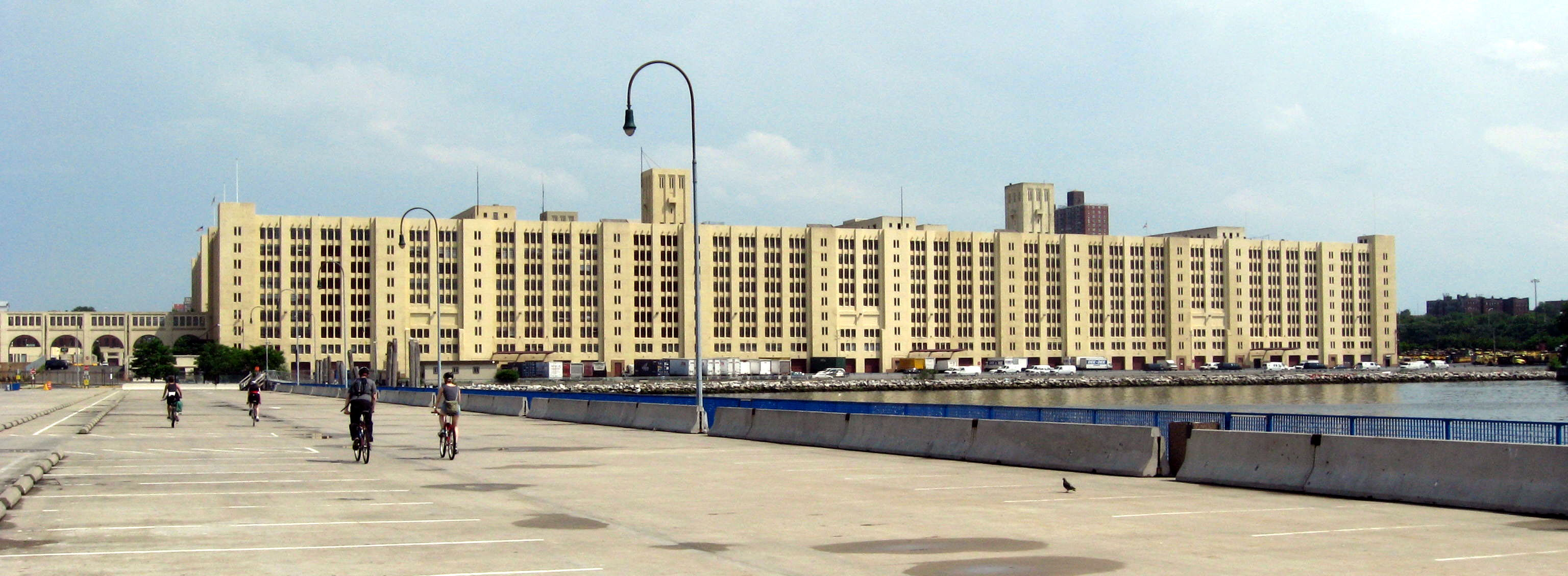
Seen from the New York Bay shorefront

The United States Department of Defense announced in May 1964 that it was considering closing Brooklyn Army Base, as well as Fort Jay and the Brooklyn Navy Yard, as part of an effort to downsize unnecessary military installations and to save money. Immediately after the announcement, local officials and labor union leaders started advocating to save the military base from closure. Despite advocacy efforts to save the base from closure, Defense Secretary Robert McNamara announced in November 1964 that the Brooklyn Army Terminal would be one of nearly a hundred military bases that would be closed. Only the military function would be decommissioned, and 90 percent of civilian workers at Brooklyn Army Terminal would retain their jobs after the base was closed. By 1965, it was confirmed that the Brooklyn Army Terminal would close to military use on January 1, 1967. Port of Embarkation activities would be relocated to the Military Ocean Terminal in Bayonne, New Jersey. Some of the base's remaining activities would be relocated to the nearby Federal Office Building at 29th Street and Third Avenue in Gowanus, Brooklyn.

Officials held a decommissioning ceremony on December 9, 1966. Immediately afterward, the New York City government announced that it would acquire the terminal for maritime redevelopment. The city planned to relocate its foreign-trade zone from Staten Island to the Brooklyn Army Terminal, where there would be more room for the foreign-trade zone's operations. In addition, U.S. Senator Jacob Javits and the Brooklyn Army Terminal Development Committee discussed possible uses for the Brooklyn Army Terminal, including for the United States Post Office Department or for the Department of Defense. A dispute arose between local business owners, who wanted a large post office facility in the terminal, and the city. In June 1969, it was announced that the U.S. government would lease a 20-acre (8.1 ha) section of the base to the city for two years. Afterward, the city continued to lease part of the base, and in turn, sublet the space to private companies.

After a fire destroyed the Morgan General Mail Facility in Manhattan in December 1967, some of the Morgan Facility's operations were temporarily moved to the newly vacated Brooklyn Army Terminal. Soon the Brooklyn Army Terminal facility was handling 18,000 bags of international mail every day. The facility employed four thousand workers, 75% of whom lived in Brooklyn. A permanent facility to replace the Brooklyn Army Terminal operation was originally planned for Murray Hill, Manhattan, but in 1970 the planned facility was moved to Jersey City, New Jersey. In December 1970, the government announced that it was going to close the post office facility at Brooklyn Army Terminal.

Shipping operations at the Brooklyn Army Terminal resumed in 1970. That same year, the federal government quietly proposed building a federal detention facility at the terminal to replace an overcrowded facility in Manhattan. The Navy moved into the terminal in 1972, and renamed it the Military Ocean Terminal. The former Brooklyn Army Base now served as the headquarters for the Military Sealift Command (MSC) Atlantic. Army shipping activities were permanently moved to Bayonne starting in 1974, saving the federal government $2 million per year. The U.S. military had completely vacated the space by October 1975.

=== Sale of terminal to city ===
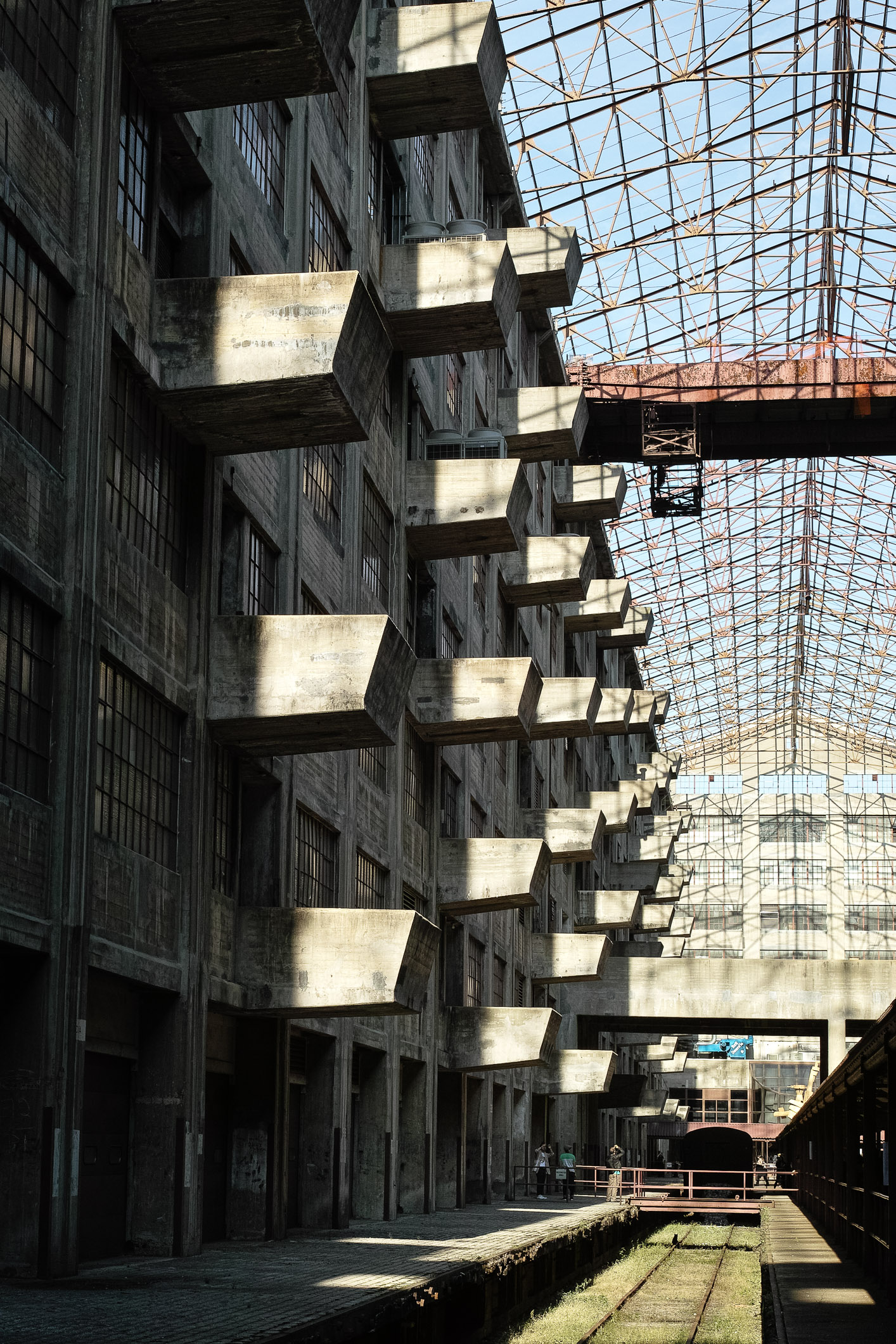
Atrium of building B

The United States Senate voted in August 1979 to allow the government of New York City to purchase and take over the terminal. A similar vote passed the United States House of Representatives that November. Shortly afterward, the city began tendering proposals from developers who wanted to redevelop the terminal. The city received four proposals: of these, two were for industrial redevelopment, one was for residential development, and one was for mixed-use development. In September 1980, Helmsley-Spear Inc. was selected to develop an industrial site at Brooklyn Army Terminal, in a format similar to at the nearby Bush Terminal. The federal government and the city then began discussing a purchase price for the terminal, but negotiations stalled for two months because of disagreements over sale price. According to New York City Economic Development Commissioner Kenneth Schuman, after a tentative deal was struck with Helmsley-Spear, Inc., the U.S. General Services Administration rejected the sale price that the regional office had agreed to, and further talks between the city government and Helmsley-Spear were put on hold.

By December, the federal government agreed to sell the terminal for $8.5 million; roughly half of the cost, or $4 million, would be paid by the city, while the remaining balance would be paid by the United States Economic Development Administration. The federal government withheld aid for another several months, but finally approved the $4.5 million grant in April 1981.

The two sides finalized the sale in July 1981. In September of that year, Helmsley-Spear Inc. CEO Harry Helmsley announced that he was withdrawing the company from a tentative deal to sublet the Brooklyn Army Terminal from the city. The withdrawal came after a disagreement over the lease terms when the city found out that Harry Helmsley, a partner in the company, was in the final stages of selling the Gair Industrial Buildings for development into a residential and commercial complex five miles to the south along the Brooklyn waterfront. Claiming that this sale could increase the Army Terminal’s value, the city had proposed new terms in which it would receive a greater share of the profits from subleasing the terminal to industrial tenants. By 1983, the city had hired Eastdil Realty, which was arranging for $20 million to rehabilitate the first building in the complex. Most of the $20 million would come from private sources, but the city would pledge $2 million and was awaiting another $5.6 million of federal Urban Development Action Grants. The city projected that a full renovation of the Brooklyn Army Terminal would take four years and cost $36 million.

The site was listed on the National Register of Historic Places in 1983. The listing includes 11 contributing buildings on an area of 97.2 acres (39.3 ha).

=== Use as manufacturing hub ===
The city government began completely renovating building B's northern half in 1985, adding 1,000,000 square feet (93,000 m^{2}) of new leasable space. As part of the renovations, the city installed electrical, plumbing, and heating infrastructure; replaced the elevators; added restrooms; landscaped and cleaned up the building's exterior; added a parking lot; and improved the loading docks. The first phase consisted of 32 units of industrial space, which each had an average of 30,000 square feet (2,800 m^{2}) of space. The renovations cost approximately $33 million. After the renovations were complete, the New York City Economic Development Corporation (NYCEDC) started leasing the property as a center for dozens of light manufacturing, warehousing and back-office businesses, with rents averaging $3.75 per square foot. The first industrial tenants signed leases for space in the terminal in May 1987. By August 1988, sixty percent of the available space had been leased, rising to eighty percent by December. All of the available space had been leased by October 1989.

The Bibby Venture, one of the two first prison barges to be brought to New York City, was purchased and docked on the East River in summer 1988 as a result of overcrowding in the city's jails. However, by August 1988, it was moved to outside Brooklyn Army Terminal. Its location outside the terminal was a temporary measure, necessitated because residents of neighborhoods along the East River objected to the barge's presence. As originally planned, the barge would be moved to Pier 40 on the West Side of Manhattan by early 1989. While docked at Brooklyn Army Terminal, the Bibby Venture was used to house prisoners awaiting trial. However, residents of Sunset Park and Bay Ridge also objected to the prison barge, saying that they had not been consulted about the decision. The Bibby Venture was moved to Pier 40 on the Hudson River in summer 1989. The Bibby Venture and its sister barge Bibby Resolution were retired from use in 1992, to be replaced by the Vernon C. Bain Correctional Center floating jail in the South Bronx, and the barges were sold two years later.

By late 1988, the city was planning to renovate another million square feet at a cost of $44.5 million. During the renovation, the city would add 40 industrial units with an average of 20,000 square feet (1,900 m^{2}) of floor space in each unit, as well as 4,700 square feet (440 m^{2}) of retail space. The city started signing leases for the space in 1990, just after construction on the second phase started. Renovations also started on parts of Building A, and work on a 400,000-square-foot (37,000 m^{2}) space in the building was completed in 1994. Upgrades to an additional 200,000 square feet (19,000 m^{2}) of space were completed in 1995. A fourth phase of renovations was completed by 2003, adding another 350,000 square feet (33,000 m^{2}). By that time, 2,600,000 square feet (240,000 m^{2}) of space had been renovated.

The city began offering public tours of Brooklyn Army Terminal's interior in 2013. The tours, offered two weekends a month, were offered through Turnstile Tours. Two years later, the city started a $100 million rehabilitation of 500,000 square feet (46,000 m^{2}) in Building A. This stage's high costs were attributed to asbestos abatement and other cleanup. The NYCEDC also started renovating the Administration Building into a food-manufacturing complex at a cost of $15 million. The renovations also included the restoration of 12,000-square-foot (1,100 m^{2}) of outdoor space, based on a design by WXY Architecture and Urban Design. By 2016, there were 3,700 people working in Brooklyn Army Terminal, with a thousand more jobs planned over the following ten years. The administration of Mayor Bill de Blasio set up a job center at Brooklyn Army Terminal to help local residents with limited English proficiency obtain jobs at the terminal.

NYC Ferry started operating to Brooklyn Army Terminal in May 2017. The terminal's food manufacturing complex opened that June. The renovation of the 500,000-square-foot space in Building A was completed in June 2018, just after the 100th anniversary of when construction started on the terminal. The refurbished area could accommodate an additional 20 companies. By this time, the renovation of the terminal was 92% complete. The Brooklyn Army Terminal had 100 companies that collectively employed 3,800 workers, but the city projected that an additional 1,000 jobs would be added once leases were granted for all of the newly renovated space. Because of the decline of traditional manufacturing in Brooklyn, most of the new tenants were companies that worked in the technology, media, food, or manufacturing sectors, while the city had stopped renewing leases for tenants that primarily worked in distribution and storage. The total cost of restoring the complex was projected to be $280 million by 2016, a cost that had risen to $300 million in 2018.

In January 2021, during the COVID-19 pandemic in New York City, a "mega-facility" vaccination site for COVID-19 vaccinations was opened at Brooklyn Army Terminal, operating 24/7. In 2024, the city government announced that Sunset Park Solar, a 725 kW (972 hp) solar array, would be built atop Warehouse B. The next year, the Los Angeles Cleantech Incubator and Cambridge Innovation Center were selected to operate a climate innovation center at the Brooklyn Army Terminal. The New York City Economic Development Corporation planned to invest $100 million in the climate center.

== Transportation ==
The piers at Brooklyn Army Terminal are used by NYC Ferry's Rockaway and South Brooklyn routes. MTA Regional Bus Operations' B11 route terminates outside Brooklyn Army Terminal, while the B37 route stops along Third Avenue, close to the terminal. The nearest New York City Subway station is at 59th Street and Fourth Avenue, served by the N and R trains. A bike trail, part of the Sunset Park Greenway, connects the Brooklyn Army Terminal to Owl's Head Park to the south. Plans for the Interborough Express, a light rail line using the Bay Ridge Branch right of way, were announced in 2023; as part of the project, a light rail station at Brooklyn Army Terminal has been proposed.

=== Ferry service ===
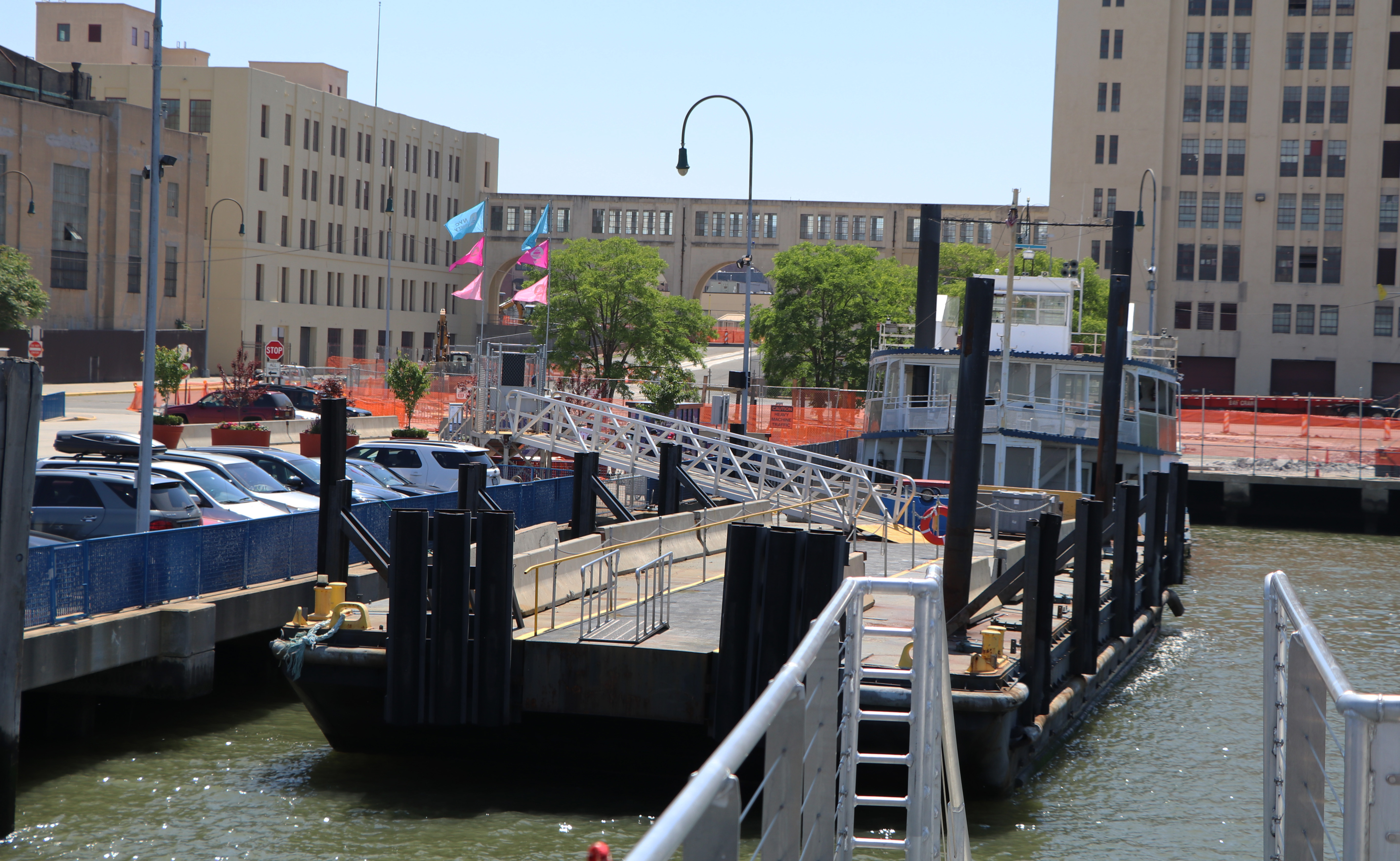
NYC Ferry stop at Brooklyn Army Terminal

A fast ferry service from Brooklyn Army Terminal to Manhattan was first proposed in 1994 as a way to revitalize Sunset Park. The boat service was expected to start service in 1997 at a cost of $25 million, and would include a new pier at 59th Street as well as a 500-space parking lot at Brooklyn Army Terminal. This ferry service was operating by late 1997, bringing increased economic activity to the Brooklyn Army Terminal area as a result.

After subway service in Lower Manhattan was disrupted following the September 11, 2001, attacks, the city established a free ferry service from the Brooklyn Army Terminal's 58th Street Pier to Pier 11/Wall Street, using funds provided by the Federal Emergency Management Agency. New York Water Taxi took over the route in 2003 and instituted a fare. In 2008, New York Water Taxi established a route between Pier 11 and Breezy Point, Queens, with a stop at Brooklyn Army Terminal. This service was indefinitely suspended in 2010 due to lack of funding.

In the aftermath of subway disruptions arising from Hurricane Sandy on October 29, 2012, SeaStreak began running a route from Rockaway Park, Queens, to Pier 11 and the East 34th Street ferry terminal. The ferry route charged a $2 fare for each passenger. A stop at Brooklyn Army Terminal was added to those trips in August 2013, following the closure of the Montague Street subway tunnel, which suspended direct service on the R train between Brooklyn and Manhattan. The ferry service proved to be popular with locals; about 250 passengers per day rode the ferry between Brooklyn Army Terminal and Manhattan, in addition to approximately 730 daily passengers riding the ferry between Rockaway and Manhattan. The ferry route carried nearly 200,000 passengers between its inception and mid-2014. The route was renewed several times through mid-2014, but was discontinued on October 31, 2014 because of a lack of funding.

On May 1, 2017, NYC Ferry's Rockaway route started operating between Pier 11/Wall Street in Manhattan's Financial District and Beach 108th Street in Rockaway Park, with a stop at Brooklyn Army Terminal. The terminal is also served by NYC Ferry's South Brooklyn route, which started running on June 1, 2017. New York Water Taxi operates an employee shuttle for NYU Langone Health that runs between the Brooklyn Army Terminal and the East 34th Street Ferry Landing, providing a connection between NYU Langone Hospital – Brooklyn and NYU Langone's academic medical center in Manhattan.

== Notable tenants ==
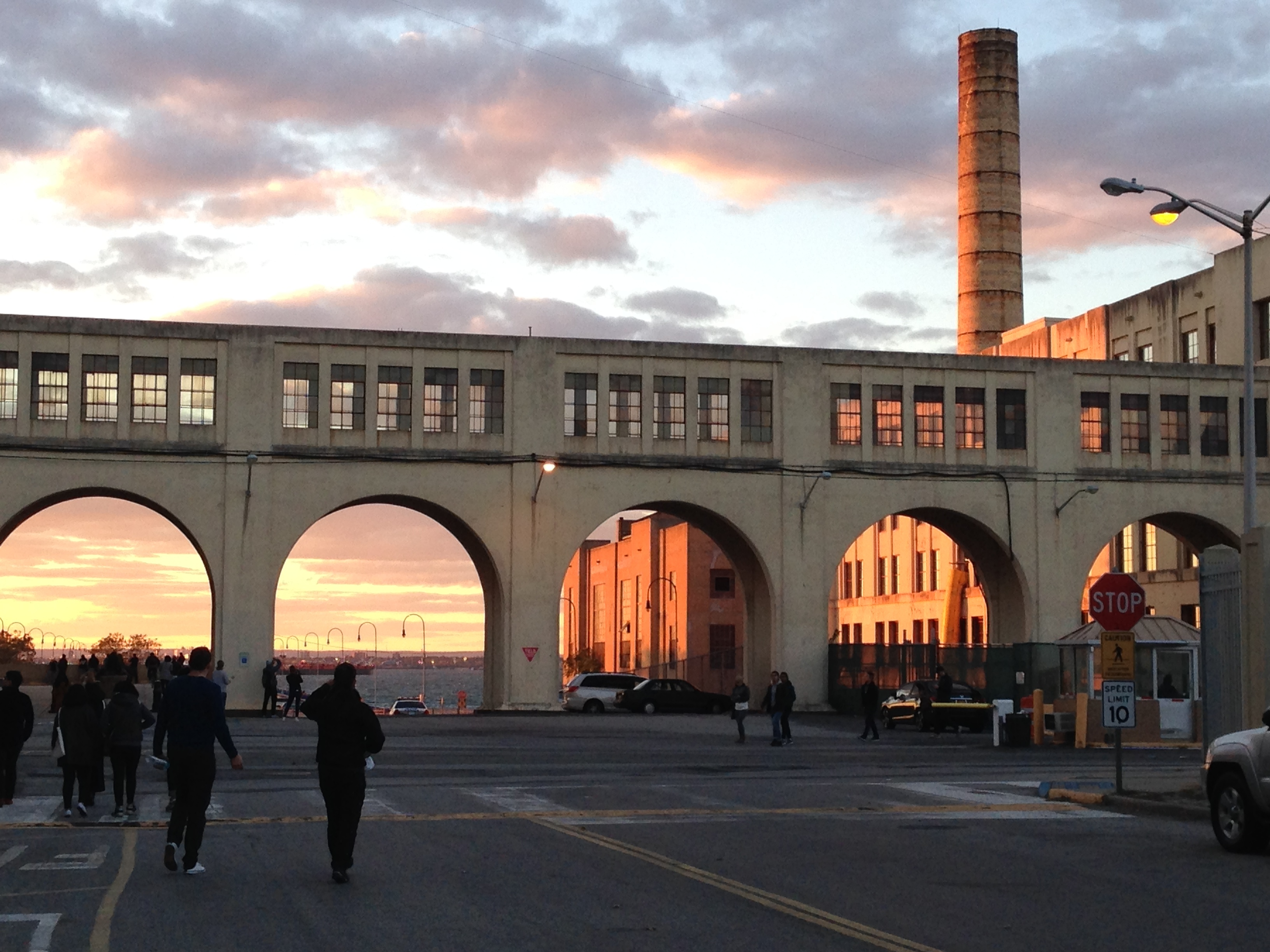
Footbridge on the north side of the terminal, as seen at sunset

Brooklyn Army Terminal is also home to a number of tenants specializing across a varied degree of industries. Notable tenants include:

- American Museum of Natural History
- chashama, artist studio program
- Ford Bay Ridge Service Center – occupies the former Federal Laundry Building on the eastern side of the terminal property
- Jomashop.com, online watch and fashion retailer
- Jacques Torres & Mr Chocolate, chocolatier
- New York City Bioscience Initiative center
- New York City Police Department Intelligence Division
- Solomon R. Guggenheim Museum
- Uncommon Goods, internet retailer

== See also ==
- National Register of Historic Places listings in Brooklyn
- Austin, Nichols and Company Warehouse, also designed by Cass Gilbert, in Williamsburg, Brooklyn
- R. C. Williams Warehouse, also designed by Cass Gilbert, in Chelsea, Manhattan
