= Spending and Government Efficiency Commission =

2011 commission in New York, US

The Spending and Government Efficiency Commission (SAGE) was created to modernize and right-size government in New York State.

The SAGE Commission was launched on May 13, 2011 by Governor Andrew M. Cuomo. The purpose of SAGE is to modernize government by improving performance, increasing accountability, and saving taxpayers' money. The SAGE commission allows the public to suggest ways to improve the efficiency and quality of government services.
