= Olav Sorenson =

American sociologist

Olav Sorenson is an American sociologist, currently the Joseph Jacobs Chair in Entrepreneurial Studies; Professor of Strategy and the Faculty Research Director, Price Center for Entrepreneurship & Innovation at the UCLA Anderson School of Management. In 2018 he received the Global Award for Entrepreneurship Research.
