= Solomon Partners =

American investment bank

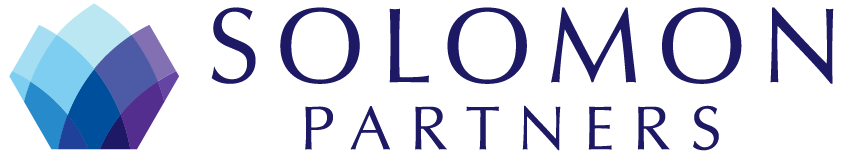
- Type: Private Company
- Industry: Investment Banking
- Founded: 1989; 37 years ago
- Headquarters: 1251 Avenue of the Americas; New York City, U.S.
- Number of employees: 150 - 200
- Website: solomonpartners.com

Solomon Partners, previously known as PJ Solomon and/or Peter J. Solomon Company, is an independently operated American investment bank and financial services company headquartered in New York City. Solomon Partners advises on mergers, acquisitions, divestitures, restructurings, recapitalizations, SPACs and capital markets.

== History ==
Solomon Partners was founded in 1989 by Peter J. Solomon. It was one of the first private independent investment banking firms on Wall Street. Originally, nearly all investment banks were privately held. By the time of the creation of Solomon Partners, most of the larger investment banks had gone public. The motivating idea behind the creation of Solomon Partners was that it would "mirror the ethos and culture" of the original privately held investment banks.

Solomon Partners is headquartered in New York City and has additional offices in Chicago and Miami.

In June 2016, Solomon Partners (at the time known as PJ SOLOMON) entered into an alliance with Natixis, a French financial services firm owned by Groupe BPCE, to expand its global M&A advisory and financing platform.

In September 2021, the company changed its name to Solomon Partners.

== Transactions ==
Solomon Partners' practices cover a number of investment verticals including business services, consumer retail, industrials, financial sponsors, financial services and fintech, grocery, pharmacy, restaurants, healthcare, infrastructure, power, renewables, media, technology, and telecommunications.

Solomon Partners was involved in these notable transactions:

- The $446 million sale of Nutraceutical International Corporation to private equity firm HGGC LLC.
- The $1 billion recapitalization and conversion sale of Save-A-Lot.
- The acquisition of Endemol Shine Group by Banijay.
