= Penfield High School =

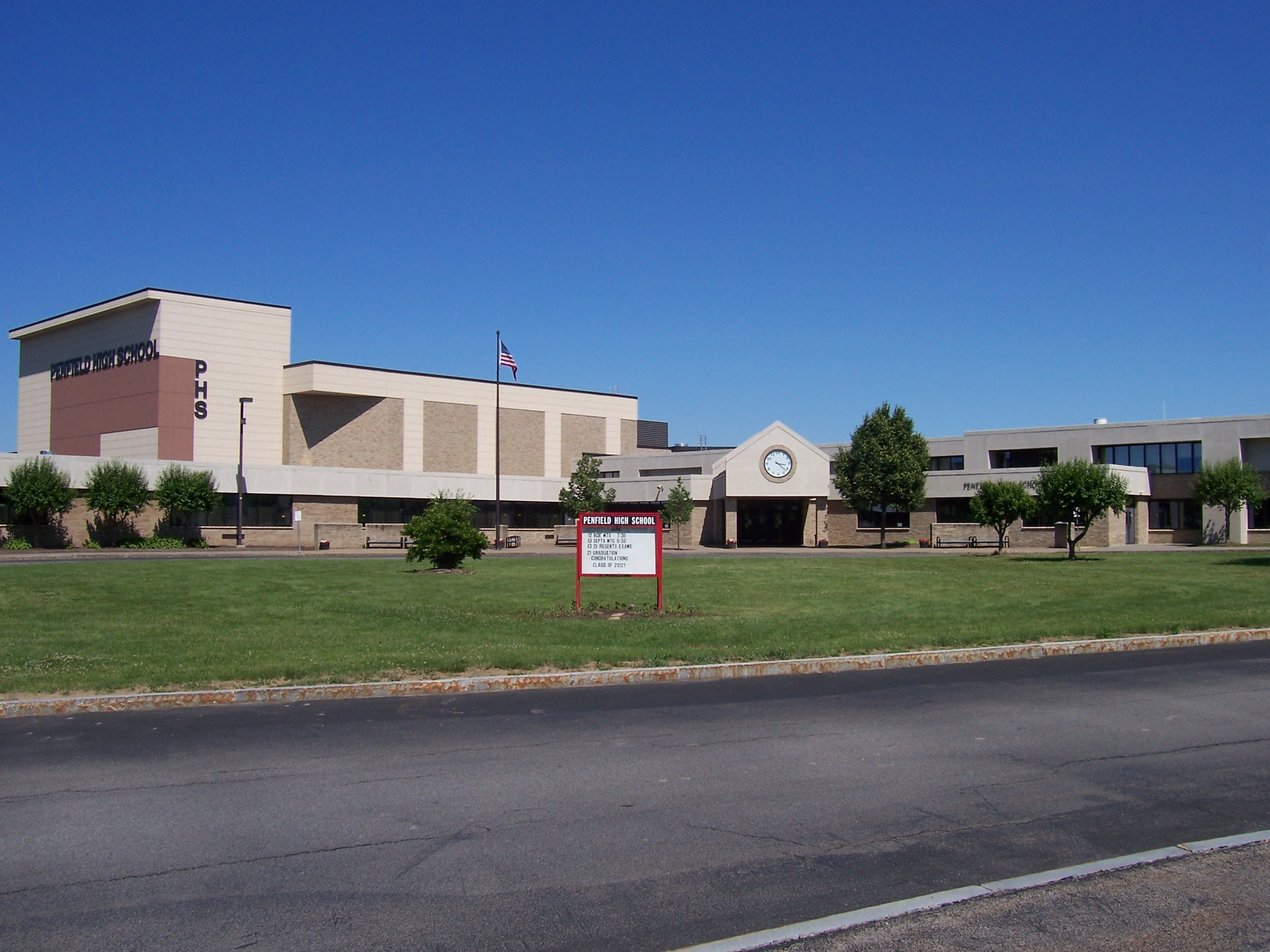

Location
- 25 High School Dr; Penfield, New York 14526; United States; 43.1363°N 77.4720°W

Information
- Type: Public
- Established: November 21, 1895; 130 years ago
- School district: Penfield Central School District
- NCES School ID: 362271003196
- Principal: LeAnna Watt
- Teaching staff: 110.91 (on an FTE basis)
- Grades: 9-12
- Gender: Co-ed
- Enrollment: 1,377 (2021-2022)
- Student to teacher ratio: 12.42
- Campus: Suburban
- Colors: Red, White and Black
- Mascot: Chiefs (1953-2001); Patriots (2001-present)
- Nickname: Patriots
- USNWR ranking: 955 (2020 national); 88 (2020 state)
- Newspaper: The Pendulum
- Yearbook: Junction
- Website: www.penfield.edu/47293_2

Penfield High School (PHS) is a public high school in Penfield, New York, United States. It offers a comprehensive curriculum for students in grades 9–12. U.S. News & World Report ranks Penfield High School 219th within the state of New York and lists the total minority enrollment at 21%, with 23% of students described as economically disadvantaged. Penfield Senior High School is the only high school in the Penfield Central School District.

== History ==
=== Penfield Seminary ===
The predecessor of Penfield High School was the Penfield Seminary, built in 1857 at 1836 Penfield Road, near Five Mile Line Road, in the 'Four Corners' area of Penfield. The school charged admission and was built to accommodate 150 students. It operated as a private academy until 1871. In 1874, Penfield Union Free School District No. 1 purchased the building for $2,500 (USD), and the structure was used as a public school until 1907, when it was sold to the local fire department. The building is still used by the Penfield Fire Company, and is visible behind the modern firehouse in the Four Corners. A "first commencement" program suggests an opening date of September 1896. A high school graduation was mentioned in a local newspaper in 1900. The Class of 1902 consisted of three graduates.

=== 1907 high school ===
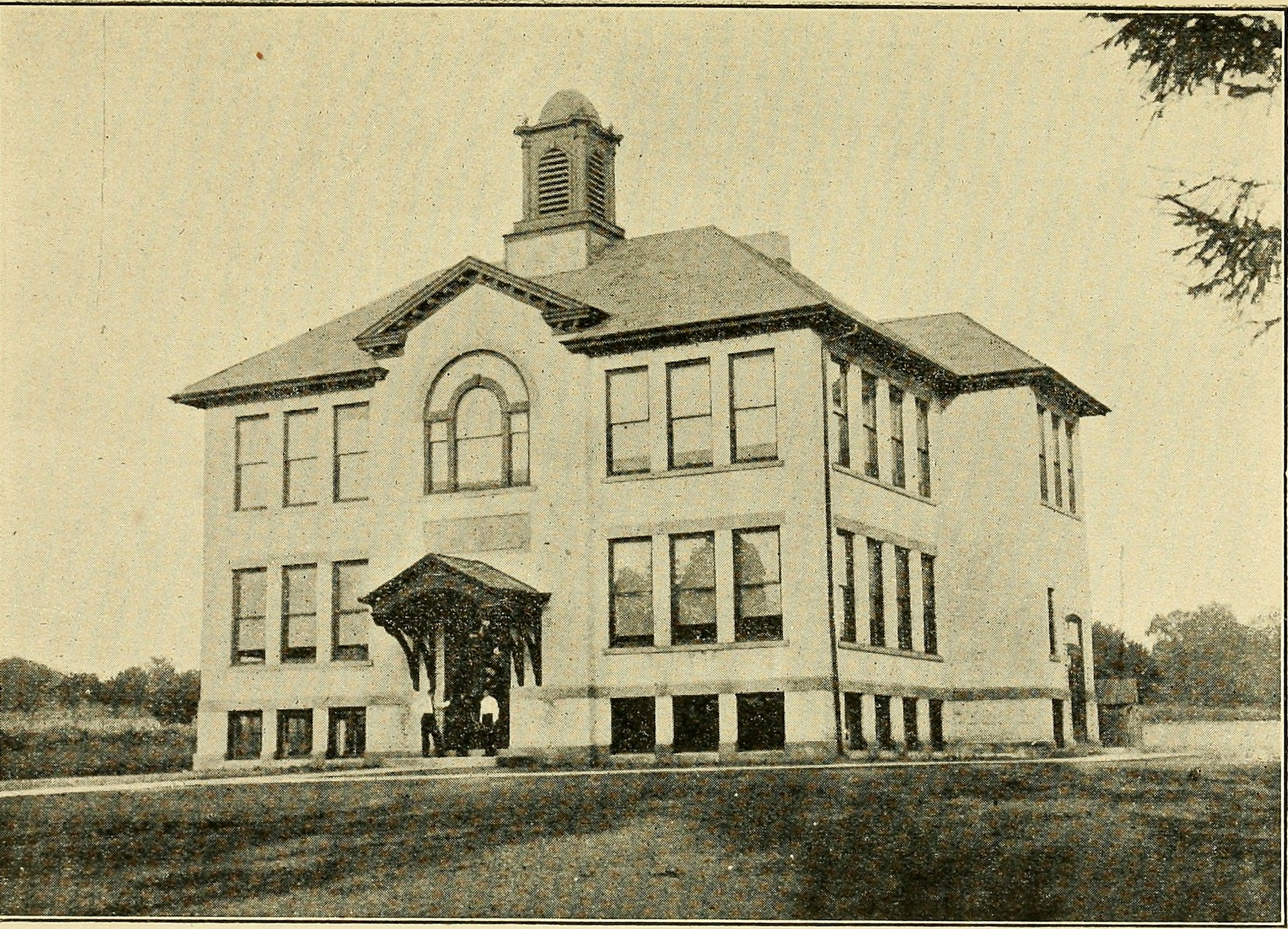
Penfield Union School as it appeared in 1909

A new union school building was constructed in 1907 at 2070 Five Mile Line Road, just a little north of the Four Corners. A high school alumni group was organized as early as 1912. In the fall of 1913, the high school opened for the year with a faculty of six: principal George Cooper; preceptress Mable Thomas; teachers Edna Payne (sixth and seventh grades); Cora Drummon (fourth and fifth grades); Helen Thomas (second and third grades)and Julia McNab (primary). The class of 1919 consisted of only one graduate, Luella Engelhart.

=== 1932 enlarged high school ===
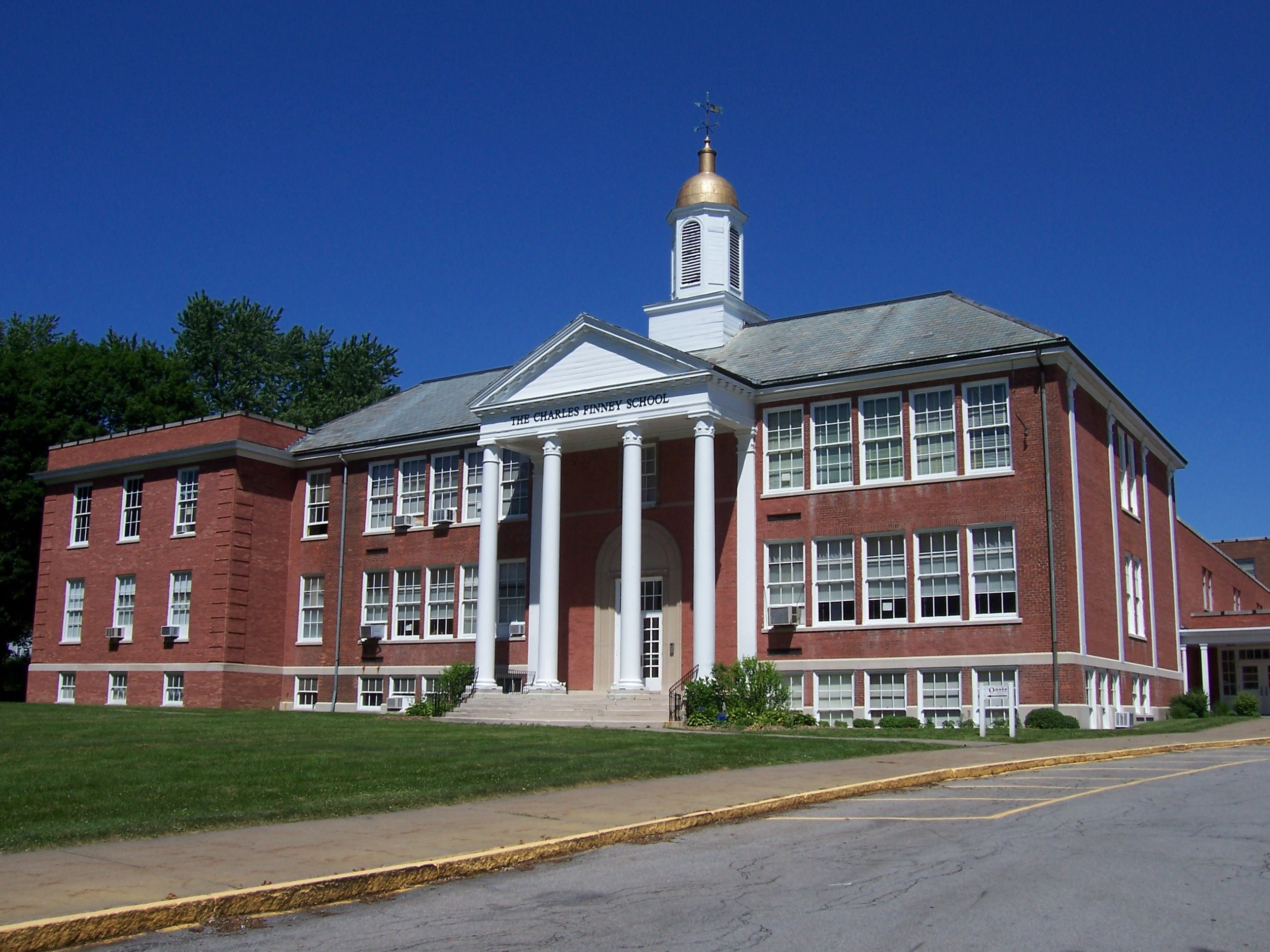
Old Penfield High School (1932–1958)

A major expansion of the high school was dedicated February 5, 1932. The new construction mostly replaced the older building, which remained as a small wing on the north side of the building. The new building was faced in brick, Colonial in design, three stories high, with eight class rooms, and a combination gymnasium and auditorium seating 500. Altogether the combined grade and high school building consisted of about 40,000 square feet of space. The addition was constructed for $200,000 (USD) and designed for a capacity of 450 students. At the time of dedication, the total attendance was 265 students, of which 67 were in the high school. In September 1934, Penfield High School had five "post graduates", four seniors, eleven juniors, thirty-seven sophomores, and forty-three freshmen.

=== Population growth ===
The Town of Penfield, New York had been created in 1840, when it was set off from the Town of Webster, New York. The population of the town was primarily rural, and was about 3,000 from the 1840s to the 1930s. In 1930 the census population of Penfield was 3,306, and in 1940 it had increased to 3,774. Penfield's growth as a suburb of Rochester, New York took off after 1950 when the population more than doubled in the next decade (4,851 in 1950 to 12,601 in 1960), doubled again in the next decade (23,732 in 1970) and continued to rise in the following years (30,654 in 2000 census).

24 students graduated from Penfield High School in 1945. The Class of 1946 consisted of 23 graduates. 21 students graduated in 1950. The Class of 1951 had 27 members.

In 1948, the number of incoming kindergarten students in Monroe County was double from four years earlier, and was expected to double again by 1952.

=== 1948 school consolidation ===
In 1947, school children in the Town of Penfield were served by eleven "common" school districts, each of which had, at one time, its own small grammar school building (often a one room school house), and the Penfield Union Free School District, which operated the high school on Five Mile Line Road. New York State adopted a master plan that year to consolidate small school districts into central schools.

Movement to consolidate the school districts in Penfield began in late 1947, when several petitioned the State Education Department to create a central district.

The Penfield Central School District was created in 1948 by combining five of the common school districts in the Town of Penfield (Districts 2, 3. 5. 7 and 8), an adjourning common school district in Wayne County (Macedon-Walworth Common School District #12) and the Penfield Union Free School District (District 1). The district voters overwhelmingly approved the reorganization on June 24, 1948, by a vote of 407 to 55. The new school district contained between 450 and 500 students, which would attend the combined grammar and high school on Five Mile Line Road and the "little Red" school house on Atlantic Avenue and Creek Street in Penfield.

Four common school districts in the northern end of Penfield were combined with school districts in Webster and two districts that included parts of the Towns of Ontario and Walworth in Wayne County to create the Webster Central School District.

=== 1949 high school expansion ===
Due to this rapidly increasing population and school consolidation, a further expansion of the high school building on Five Mile Line Drive was approved in 1949. Five and one half acres of land was acquired in the rear of the existing building. The expansion added a gymnasium, expanded facilities, and a new 14 room elementary school in the rear of the building. The cost of the expansion was $565,000 (USD). The expanded school building was designed for 800 students. The old gymnasium was turned into an auditorium and the new addition included a double gymnasium.

The expanded school opened in 1951, but a year later the district was planning to move the first four grades of the elementary students out to allow for more high school students. District voters approved a new 20 room elementary school building in December 1953

=== Annexation of Indian Landing School District ===
The future growth of Penfield High School accelerated rapidly in 1954 with the annexation of the Indian Landing School District (Brighton District #7) to the Penfield Central School District. The Town of Brighton is located immediately south of the City of Rochester and, though smaller than Penfield, experienced suburban growth earlier than Penfield (while the population of Penfield in 1940 was 3,774, Brighton's population that year was 13,132). The Indian Landing School District was located at the eastern end of the town, east of East Avenue. The district operated its own grammar school on Landing Road for grades 1 through 8, and graduates went to Brighton High School or Monroe High School in the city of Rochester, with the school district paying the tuition. Before World War II, the Indian Landing school was fairly small, graduating, for example, only nine students from eighth grade in 1936, increasing to 27 graduates by 1941 In 1941, Indian Landing School District residents voted to build a new building, at a cost of $190,000. Construction was delayed by the war (, but authorization for the new school, at 16 class rooms and an anticipated cost of $470,000 was granted by the New York State Education Department in 1946. The new elementary school, still standing, opened at 702 Landing Road North, in 1949. Nine classrooms were added two years later, yet by 1953 the building was overcrowded again. Meanwhile, Brighton High School, first opened in 1931, with its current building opening in 1940, was reaching capacity.

In 1954, officials at Brighton School District #1, which operated Brighton High, informed Indian Landing officials that their high school was reaching capacity and could not assure that the high school would accept new Indian Landing students after 1955. The Indian Landing district had only two alternatives: build their own small high school, which would have been expensive, or be annexed by Penfield Central, located to the east. The merger would significantly increase the student population of the enlarged school district, as the Indian Landing student population (over 800 in 1953) was nearly as large as the entire Penfield Central population. The Indian Landing district voted for the annexation in April 1954, and the voters of Penfield approved the merger three months later.

Following the merger Indian Landing students already attending Brighton High School could continue there, but new graduates of the grammar school would attend Penfield High. Penfield school officials supported the merger as it would increase the high school population to a size allowing a larger high school program and more varied curriculum. The addition of the Brighton territory also greatly increased the tax basis of the whole district, as the assessed valuation of the real estate in the Indian Landing School District was $10.5 million (USD), nearly twice that of the pre-annexation Penfield Central District ($5.6 million)

The annexation greatly sped up plans for a new Penfield High School building. Even prior to the merger, Penfield planned to build a new elementary school behind the Five Mile Line Grammar and High School building, on a site that a few years later would be the site of the new high school. With the addition of Indian Landing students, two new Penfield elementary schools were quickly planned. The school that would have been on the future high school site was instead built further away on Baird Road, and an identical school was built on Atlantic Avenue; meanwhile a new high school building was anticipated to be built by 1957. In 1955, plans for a new high school for 750 students, with the existing Five Mile Line building being converted to a Junior High School were being proposed. These plans were being proposed while the Five Mile Line building still housed the district's only elementary school, other than Indian Landing, and the high school graduating class in 1955 was still only 25 students.

In the fall of 1955, in a race against time, the 585 junior and senior high school students in the Five Mile Line building had to go to split sessions, with grades 9 through 12 attending from 8 am to 12:15 pm, and grades 7 and 8 attending 12:15 pm to 4:37 pm. The double schedule continued until the Atlantic Avenue school was completed later that school year and elementary school students could be moved out of the Five Mile Line Road building. The Atlantic Avenue Elementary School partially opened February 20, 1956, allowing 360 students from Grades 2 through 5 to transfer out of the overcrowded high school building on Five Mile Line Road. Split sessions at the high school and junior high ended a week later.

=== Teacher salaries in the 1950s ===
In the 1956-57 school year, starting salaries for teachers in the Penfield Central School District was increased to $3,700 per year, which was second highest in Monroe County (Brighton School District #1, which operated Brighton High School, paid starting teachers $50 more) and $400 higher than the starting salary for teachers in the Rochester City School District.

=== 1958 new high school building ===
On January 31, 1956, Penfield voters approved purchasing 25 acres of land between the existing high school and the new elementary school being built on Baird Road, thereby linking the two parcels. The newly purchased land was intended for a new high school building, and increased the size of the School District's campus from Five Mile Line Road to Baird Road to 61 acres. The district also acquired a 100-foot strip of land from Five Mile Line Road to the newly acquired property, which became the high school access roadway.

The district proposed to the public that they build a new high school with 31 classrooms for 950 students, at a cost of $2,600,000 (USD), and, separately, proposed a pool for the new school at a cost of $150,000. However, Penfield voters defeated both proposals on April 10, 1956. A majority had voted for the proposal (1,089 in favor, 813 against), but a two-thirds majority was required to pass this particular bond issue, as the district had exceeded its legal debt limit with the two elementary schools it was building.

The district resubmitted the high school proposal for a second vote, without the swimming pool option, but voters again failed to approve it by the required two thirds majority May 21, 1956. The second vote was 1,736 in favor, 898 against, and, for some unknown reason, 133 votes incorrectly cast and invalidated.

The proposal was submitted to the voters a third time in less than three months, on June 21, 1956. School officials warned that even if approved the new building would not be completed by the beginning of the 1958-59 school year, and the high school would have to go back on split sessions. The high school construction project was finally approved on the third vote, by a vote of 2,615 in favor, 1,071 opposed, and 22 votes blank.

The new high school building was constructed at a cost of $13.70 per square foot, which was $5.03 lower than the average new school construction costs in New York State at the time. Architects for the project were C. Storrs Barrows & Associates, who had served as architects for the district since 1931.

The two-story academic wing included the following: 1) a three room home economics suite, which included four kitchens, sewing and laundry center; 2) an audio visual screening and work room; 3) a library accommodating 8,000 books; 4) a business education area with secretarial practice and typing practice rooms; 5) a double-size art room, with kiln; 6) chemistry, physics, biology and general science rooms, each with laboratories separated from the classroom space; 7) four math classrooms; 8) four citizenship education class rooms; 9) six English classrooms.

The new building also included: 1) a cafeteria with seating for 500; 2) wood and metal shop classrooms, with the metal shop designed with a garage door entrance to accommodate auto shop education; 3) an auditorium seating 1,000, with a stage 68 feet wide and 28 feet deep; 3) a double-size gymnasium 110 feet by 90 feet, with a motor driven partition, allowing it to be separated it into two sections, and bleacher seating for 1,500 spectators, plus locker and shower rooms and 5) offices for administrators, guidance counselors and school nurses.

A year after the basic school proposal was finally approved, voters agreed on June 11, 1957 to add a pool, at a cost of $250,000, to the high school construction project.

The new high school building opened in 1958. The old high school building on Five Mile Line Drive was converted into a Junior High School, housing grades 6 through 8. School officials wished to move the sixth grade out of the junior high, but the three elementary schools (Indian Landing, Atlantic Avenue and Baird Road) were already at full capacity. The district proposed building a fourth elementary school on the Panorama Plaza area, on the west side of Panorama Trail Road about five hundred feet from Penfield Road, at a cost of $1,450,000 (USD). The proposed school would be built on a 26-acre parcel and would have had capacity for 800 students. The anticipated cost was reduced to $1290,000 before a vote on the bond issue, but voters rejected the proposal by a vote of 726 against, 500 in favor. Officials concluded that the proposed location, near an active commercial area, caused the defeat, so the school district revised the plan, proposing the school be located on Gebhardt Road, just south of the Five Mile Line entrance to the high school, to be built for $1,235,000, and to be opened by the 1961-62 school year. This proposal passed, by a vote of 1014 to 788. The school, known as Cobbles Elementary School, is located at 140 Gebhardt Road, Penfield, and currently has an enrollment of 500 students, from kindergarten to fifth grade.

=== New junior high school and proposed new high school ===
The school district acquired a 47-acre site at the north east corner of Atlantic Avenue and Scribner Road, at a cost of $125,000, and commenced construction of its fifth elementary school there in 1963. The new school Scribner Road had a capacity for 600 students and at a cost of $1,065,000 (USD). The plan was to add a junior high school and, eventually, a second Senior High School on the parcel. The new junior high school, Bay Trail, was constructed on the site for $2,975,000 (USD), with a capacity for 700 students The new junior high school opened September 1966 with 786 students, the high school ninth graders were moved into the two junior highs.

With the opening of the new Bay Trail Junior High School, the older junior high school (the former high school building on Five Mile Line Drive, now renamed Denonville Junior High School) was renovated, at a cost of $1,721,000 (USD). The oldest wing of the building, the original 1907 building, was demolished and replaced with new construction, while the 1932 and 1952 wings were remodeled. The Denonville Junior High School building (later named Denonville Middle School) was closed in 1980 due to declining enrollment. The Charles Finney School, a private Christian High School, purchased the former Denonville building in 1991.

As of 2000, the enrollment in the Penfield Central School District, including those from eastern Brighton, reached 5,076, and an additional 1,546 students living in the northern end of the Town of Penfield were enrolled in the Webster Central School District (total Webster enrollment that year was 8,281).

=== Explosive growth ===
With rapid suburban growth and the addition of the Indian Landing school district, the size of the graduation class from Penfield High School, unchanged in the decade preceding 1955, grew tenfold in the next ten years. From a class of 25 students in 1955, the number of graduates doubled to 48 in 1958, doubled again in one year to 91 in 1959, increased to 146 in 1961, 160 a year later, 186 in 1963, 259 in 1964, and to 280 in 1966.

=== Student protest ===
The first recorded protest by high school students at Penfield was a cafeteria boycott in 1959. On January 14, only about 13 of the 600 high school students purchased lunch at the cafeteria; the rest brought food from home. Students complained that portions were too small and lacked variety. Wallace J. Howell, the high school principal, met with student leaders that afternoon, and settled the dispute. With tongue somewhat in cheek, the editorial page of the metropolitan newspaper saluted the student's "gastronomical gusto" revolt against bland food.

Principals
Name	Tenure
William G. Clarke	1898 – 1901
William J. Whipple	1901 – 1910
C.J. Rogers	1911 –
Elizabeth Smith	–
Louis E. Bird	1927 – 1932
Clark J. Dye	1932 – 1934
Edwin L. Fisher	Summer 1934 – 1952
Elmer F. Peck	1952 – 1955
Wallace J. Howell	1955 – January 1, 1970
Donald G. Burt	January 2, 1970 – June 30, 1995
Terry Piper	Summer 1995 – April 1998
Pamela W. Kissel	July 1, 1998 – about 2002
David Loucks	about 2002 – June 2003
Mark S. Van Vliet	July 2003 – June 30, 2008
Ronald J. Marro	July 2008 – July 31, 2010
Thomas K. Putnam	August 2010 – July 7, 2014
Leslie G. Maloney	August 12, 2014 – June 2015 (acting); June 2015 – June 30, 2021
LeAnna Watt	July 1, 2021 – Present

== Academics ==
In addition to traditional core subjects, students can choose from a variety of Advanced Placement offerings for college credit, such as AP English Language and Composition, and American Studies, which combines AP US History with the eleventh grade English Honors class, even AP Music Theory. Also offered are U.S. History and Government, American Government, biology, chemistry, physics, computer science, English Literature, French, Spanish, mathematics and statistics. Penfield offers numerous electives in arts, music, engineering, and business. The foreign language department includes Spanish, French, and German. Vocational and alternative education experiences are also made available to students.

== Sports ==
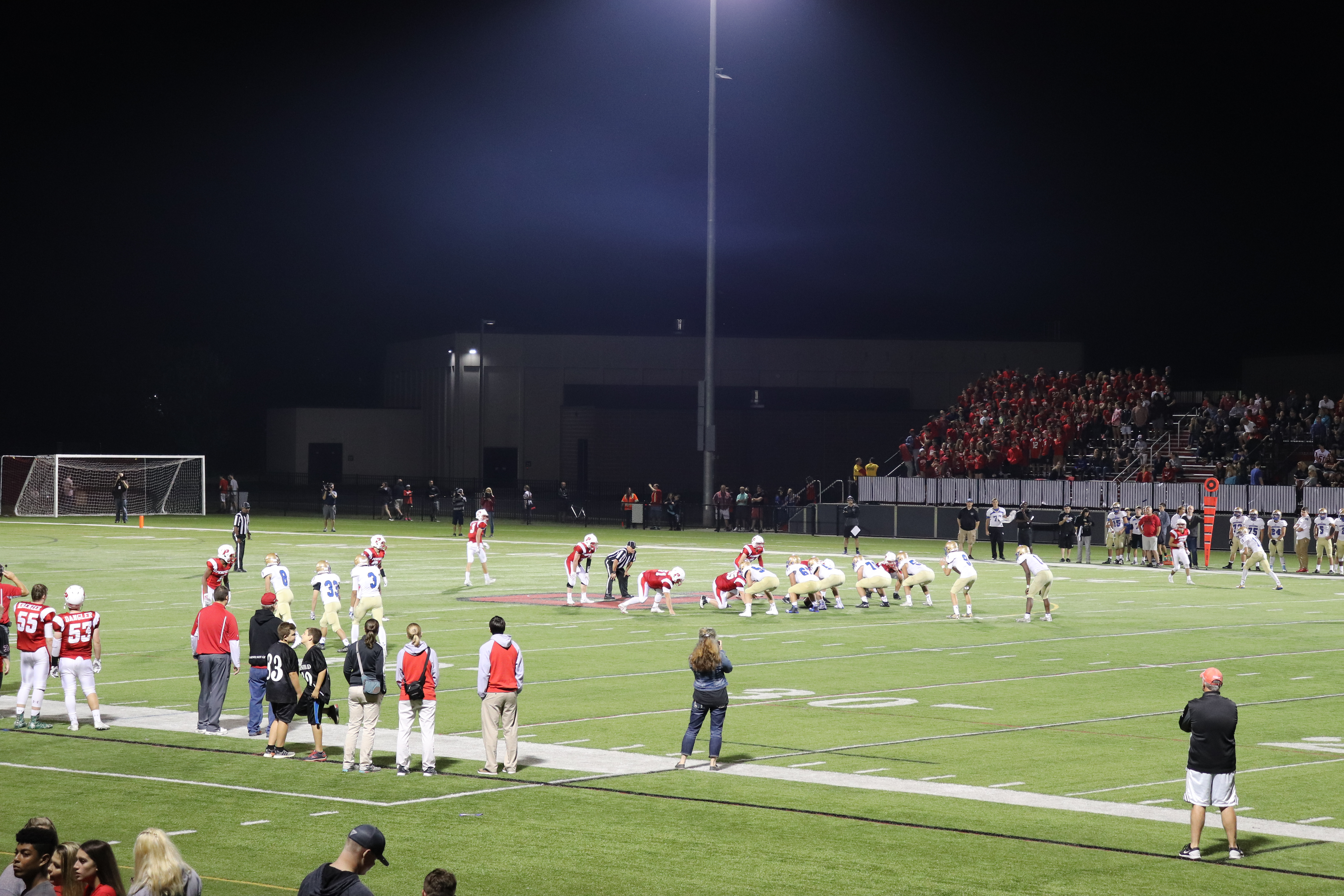
The Penfield Patriots face off against the Webster Warriors at Penfield High School Stadium

Penfield is a Class AA school in Section V for New York state. It competes against the largest schools in the state for sectional and state championships. Penfield Varsity Soccer is the nation's #8 program in all-time wins in high school soccer. The Penfield Patriots were previously known as the Penfield Chiefs with the mascot of a Native American Indian Chief in full feather head dress. The longtime Boys' and Girls' cross country, indoor, and outdoor track head coach, Dave Hennessey, holds the record for the most high school cross country wins in national history with over 900.

=== State titles ===
- Boys' volleyball: 1987, 1989, 1994, 2009, 2016, 2017, 2021, 2024
- Boys' soccer: 2001, 2002, 2004
- Girls' volleyball: 2005, 2011, 2017, 2018
- Girls' gymnastics: 2004, 2006
- Girls' swimming: 2017

=== Section V titles ===
- Men's Bowling: 2011
- Boys' Baseball: 1975, 2009, 2010, 2012, 2021
- Boys' Cross country: 1994, 2005, 2007, 2016, 2018
- Boys' Indoor track: 1997, 2023, 2024
- Boys' Lacrosse: 1992, 1993, 2000, 2006, 2013, 2018, 2025
- Boys' Soccer: 1949, 1952, 1955, 1958, 1966, 1970, 1976, 1977, 1988, 1989, 1990, 1991, 1994, 1999, 2000, 2001, 2002, 2004, 2010, 2020
- Boys' Tennis: 1988, 2001, 2002, 2003, 2019
- Boys' Volleyball:1976, 1977, 1978, 1979, 1980, 1983, 1984, 1985, 1986, 1987, 1988, 1989, 1994, 2000, 2006, 2007, 2008, 2009, 2016, 2017, 2021(s),2021(f)
- Boys' Wrestling (Class AA): 2010
- Girls' Lacrosse: 1997, 2007, 2012, 2013
- Girls' Tennis: 2003, 2008, 2009
- Girls' Gymnastics: 2003, 2004, 2005, 2006
- Girls' Indoor Track: 2011
- Girls' Basketball: 2009, 2012, 2016, 2021
- Girls' Swimming 2009
- Girls' Cross Country: 1998, 1999, 2000, 2001, 2010
- Girls' Field Hockey 2003, 2019
- Girls' Track and Field 2012
- Cheerleading: Winter 2013, Fall 2013, Winter 2014, Fall 2015
- Ice Hockey: 2021, 2022

In 1950 Penfield High School beat Scottsville 5-2 to win the Class C Monroe County Soccer Championship.

== Notable alumni ==
- Pete Duel (1940-1971) - actor
- Joanie Laurer (1969-2016) - professional wrestler under the ring name Chyna.
- Josh Bolton (born 1984) - professional soccer player
- Joe Mercik (born c. 1975) - professional soccer player
- Bud Lewis (born 1953) - professional soccer player
- Richard Saeger (born 1964) - Olympic swimmer and former world record holder
- Rob Campbell - Actor (Unforgiven, The Crucible), Class of 1983
- Don Alhart (born 1944) - Broadcast TV Anchor Career Record Holder, Class of 1962
