= Dayton's Corners School =

- U.S. National Register of Historic Places
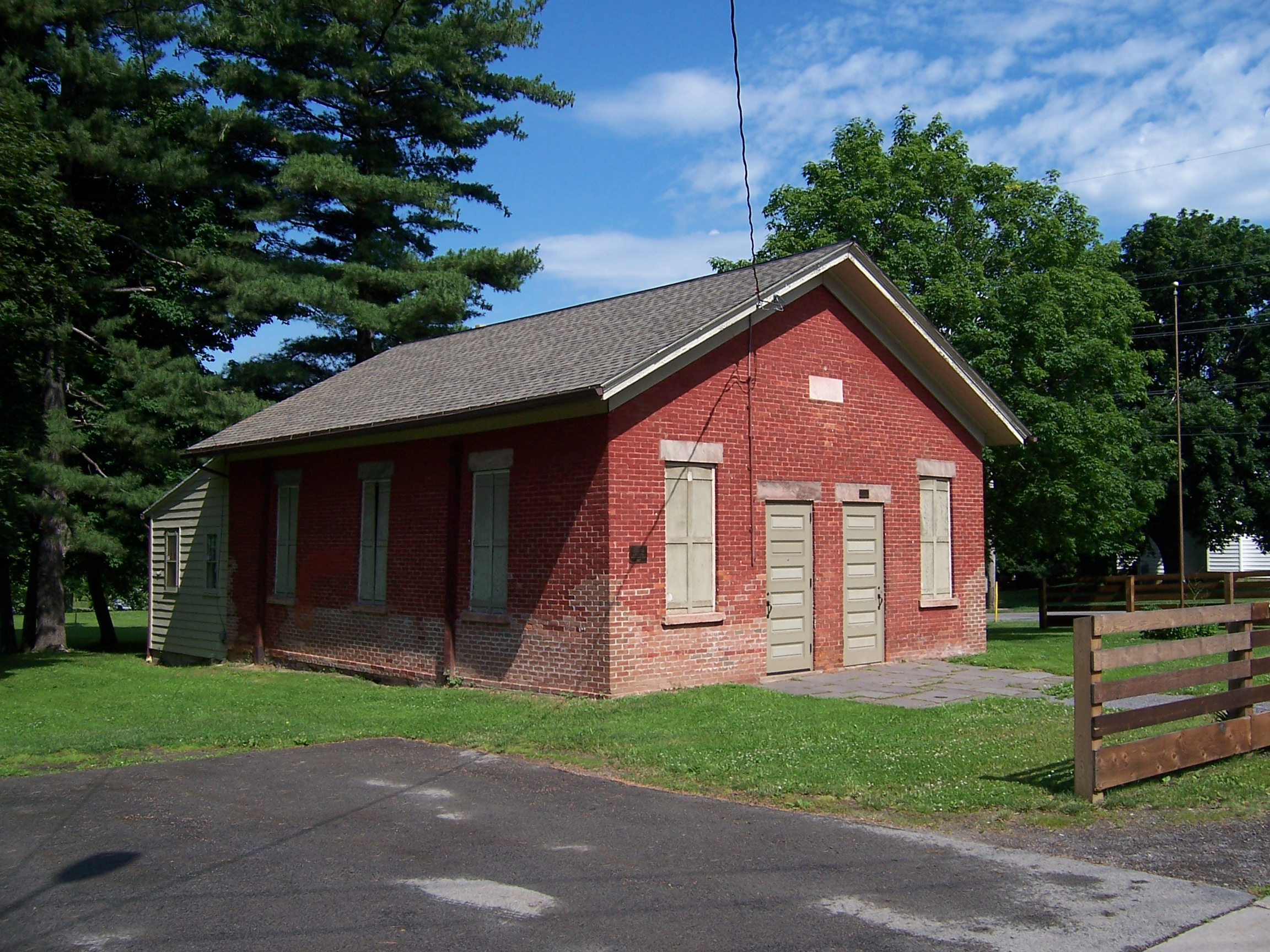

- Location within New York Location within the United States
- Location: 1363 Creek St. Penfield, New York
- Coordinates: 43°10′56″N 77°30′9″W
- Built: 1857
- Architectural style: Mid 19th Century Revival
- NRHP reference No.: 01000716
- Added to NRHP: July 05, 2001

Dayton's Corners School is a one-room school building in the town of Penfield, New York. Erected in 1857, it sits at the corner of Plank Road and Creek Street and was part of Penfield District #9. It is the only one-room school house in the area that is still standing and has not been converted to some other use.

The building was part of the Webster Central School District between 1948 and 1991, although it was only used as a schoolhouse until the early 1960s. The building has been maintained by Penfield's recreation department since 1976; it was purchased by the town in 1991. The original school grounds are adjacent to the school building. The school and its grounds are used by fourth-grade teachers in the Penfield Central School District and other local school districts as part of the state-mandated local history curriculum.

The red brick building was designated a Penfield Landmark in 1983 and added to the National Register of Historic Places on July 5, 2001.

A coloring book called "A Day at Dayton's Corners" was created in 2010 as part of the town of Penfield's bicentennial celebrations.
