= Brighton Central School District =

School district in New York, United States

Address
- 2035 Monroe Avenue Rochester, New York, 14618; United States

District information
- Type: Public
- Grades: K–12
- Budget: $110,572,957 (2025-26)
- NCES District ID: 3605460

Students and staff
- Students: 3,829 (2025–26)
- Teachers: 391
- Staff: 305
- Student–teacher ratio: 12.15:1

Other information
- Website: www.bcsd.org

The Brighton Central School District is a public school district in New York State that serves approximately 3,800 students in portions of the towns of Brighton and Pittsford in Monroe County. As of 2025, the district employed at least 696 people, consisting of 391 professional staff and 305 support staff. The district has an operating budget of $104,856,329 for the 2024–2025 school year and will have a budget of $110,572,957 for the 2025–2026 school year. The average class size is between 17 and 20 students.

== Board of education ==
The board of education has seven elected members. Members serve overlapping three-year terms with two or three seats up for election each year.

== Schools ==
- Council Rock Primary School (CRPS) Grades K-2, 736 students
- French Road Elementary School (FRES) Grades 3–5, 722 students
- Twelve Corners Middle School (TCMS) Grades 6–8, 792 students
- Brighton High School (BHS) Grades 9–12, 1,175 students
- Total amount of students - 3829 students.

== See also ==
- List of school districts in New York
