= Arthur Schneider =

American film editor

- Born: January 26, 1930; New York, United States
- Died: October 1, 2009 (aged 79); Port Hueneme, California, United States

Arthur Schneider (January 26, 1930 – October 1, 2009) was a television pioneer and a four-time Emmy Award winning television editor, with a career spanning from 1951 to 1988.

== Early years ==
Arthur Schneider grew up in New York, and attended Brighton High School in Brighton, Monroe County, New York and Wentworth Military Academy in Lexington, Missouri.

In 1948, he entered the University of Southern California, where he majored in Cinema.

== Career ==
His television career began in 1951 at the NBC studios in Hollywood where he spent more than 17 years as a motion picture film and videotape editor.

Schneider received seven Emmy nominations, winning four times. His first win was in 1966 for a Julie Andrews special on NBC. He won his second in 1968 for Laugh-In on NBC. His third was in 1973 for another Julie Andrews show on ABC, and in 1984, he won his fourth for editing an episode of the ABC Afterschool Special series.

He was a life member of the honorary American Cinema Editors Society (A.C.E.) and was nominated for an "Eddie" award for editing another Julie Andrews Special in 1973.

His list of more than 1,100 film and tape screen credits include the Bob Hope Comedy Specials, the Danny Thomas specials, the Laugh-In series, the Sonny and Cher series, the Dean Martin specials, and The New Mickey Mouse Club series for Walt Disney.

He developed the "jump cut", an editing style used on Rowan & Martin's Laugh-In in which a sudden cut from one shot to another is made without a fade-out. The term eventually became his nickname and the title of his autobiography. In 1999, Schneider was given the American Cinema Editors Career Achievement Award.
