= Penfield, New York =

- Town
- Motto: "A town of planned progress"
- Location in Monroe County and the state of New York

- Location of New York in the United States
- Coordinates: 43°09′40″N 77°26′48″W
- Country: United States
- State: New York
- County: Monroe
- Established: March 30, 1810; 216 years ago

Government
  - Town Supervisor-Elect: Kevin Berry (D; 2026-Present) Town council: Jon Getz (D); Bill Lang (D); Linda Teglash (D)

Area
  - Total: 37.88 sq mi (98.1 km^{2})
  - Land: 37.24 sq mi (96.5 km^{2})
  - Water: 0.64 sq mi (1.7 km^{2})
- Elevation: 512 ft (156 m)

Population (2020)
  - Total: 39,438
  - Estimate (2023): 38,274
  - Density: 1,027.8/sq mi (396.8/km^{2})
- Time zone: UTC-5 (EST)
  - Summer (DST): UTC-4 (EDT)
- ZIP Codes: 14526 (Penfield); 14450 (Fairport); 14502 (Macedon); 14580 (Webster); 14625 (Panorama)
- Area code: 585
- FIPS code: 36-055-57144
- Website: www.penfieldny.gov

Penfield is a town in Monroe County, New York, United States. The population was 39,438 at the 2020 census, up from 36,242 in 2010.

The town was incorporated in 1810 by the proprietor Daniel Penfield, a veteran of the Revolutionary War who purchased the town lands in 1795 and moved to the area in 1809. Penfield is a suburb of Rochester. The town sits along Irondequoit Creek, which in the town's early days fueled its economy with mills.

== History ==
The lands that now constitute the town of Penfield were part of the hunting grounds of the Seneca people, a member of the Haudenosaunee tribes. There is no evidence of Seneca settlements within Penfield, but the town does include the place now called "Indian Landing". From this landing on the shores of Irondequoit Bay, trails and water routes went throughout the region and beyond. This included a water route with only two portages leading from the Great Lakes to the Gulf of Mexico.

Following the American Revolution, the lands that became Penfield were included in the Phelps and Gorham Purchase. After passing through several hands, Townships 13 and 14 of Range IV of the Phelps and Gorham Purchase were acquired by Daniel Penfield in several transactions during the course of 1795. Penfield's house still stands at 1784 Penfield Road.

All settlements in the region that were to the east of the Genesee River became part of the town of Northfield in 1796. Those to the west of the river were organized into Northampton in 1797. As the population rapidly grew both settlements divided. Northfield first became Boyle, from which Penfield split in 1810.

The town of Penfield was established in 1810, and the first town meeting was held on April 2, 1811. The town initially consisted of Townships 13 and 14 of Range IV. A portion of the southwest corner went to the town of Brighton when it was established in 1814, and Township 14 became the town of Webster in 1840. Modern Penfield is, with minor differences, Township 13 of Range IV of the Phelps and Gorham Purchase.

The original Penfield town hall was built in 1895 and was deemed a Penfield landmark in 1981. The building is located at 2131 Five Mile Line Road. In the 1950s the downstairs of the town hall was the library, and when the location of the Penfield town hall was changed, the library took over the entire building. The library has since been moved to Baird Road Community Center. In 1966 the Penfield Town hall was moved to its current location at 3100 Atlantic Avenue. The original building of the town hall is currently the Penfield Arts Center.

The Horace and Grace Bush House, Daisy Flour Mill, Dayton's Corners School, Hipp-Kennedy House, Mud House, Penfield Road Historic District, Stephen Phelps House, Samuel Rich House, and Harvey Whalen House are listed on the National Register of Historic Places.

== Geography ==
Penfield is in eastern Monroe County and is bordered to the north by the town of Webster, to the south by the towns of Perinton and Pittsford, and to the west by the towns of Irondequoit and Brighton. The coterminous village and town of East Rochester is less than one mile south of the Penfield border. To the east is the town of Walworth in Wayne County.

According to the U.S. Census Bureau, the town of Penfield has a total area of 37.88 square miles (98.1 km^{2}), of which 37.24 square miles (96.5 km^{2}) are land and 0.64 square miles (1.7 km^{2}), or 1.68%, are water. Irondequoit Creek crosses the southwest corner of the town and then forms part of the town's western border, emptying into Irondequoit Bay, part of which occupies the northwest corner of the town.

Nearly two million years ago, Penfield's topography was formed by melting glaciers. The same forces that created the Finger Lakes helped develop interesting terrain in and around Ellison Park. These glacial ice melt carvings left fertile lands which today are used in farming (and from the late 20th century to the present, housing developments). The soil is rich for farming certain types of apples, cherries, plums, peaches, and pears.

Penfield includes a number of parks with a variety of terrain, water features, lodges and shelters, open spaces, and athletic facilities.

- Athletic fields
- Abraham Lincoln Park
- Channing H. Philbrick Park (formerly Linear Park)
- Ellison Park
- Greenwood Park
- Harris Whalen Park
- Heritage Park
- LaSalle's Landing Park
- Lucien Morin Park
- Rothfuss Park
- Schaufelberger Park
- Shadow Pines Municipal Land
- Sherwood Fields Park
- Veteran's Memorial Park

== Demographics ==
Historical population
Census	Pop.	Note	%±
1820	3,244		—
1830	4,477		38.0%
1840	2,842		−36.5%
1850	3,185		12.1%
1860	3,210		0.8%
1870	2,928		−8.8%
1880	2,955		0.9%
1890	2,845		−3.7%
1900	2,857		0.4%
1910	2,977		4.2%
1920	2,087		−29.9%
1930	3,306		58.4%
1940	3,774		14.2%
1950	4,847		28.4%
1960	12,601		160.0%
1970	23,782		88.7%
1980	27,201		14.4%
1990	30,219		11.1%
2000	34,645		14.6%
2010	36,242		4.6%
2020	39,438		8.8%
U.S. Decennial Census

As of the census of 2000, there were 34,645 people, 13,144 households, and 9,634 families residing in the town. The population density was 923.9 inhabitants per square mile (356.7/km^{2}). There were 13,673 housing units at an average density of 364.6 per square mile (140.8/km^{2}). The racial makeup of the town was 93.48% White, 3.05% Asian, 2.11% African American, 0.12% Native American, 0.02% Pacific Islander, 0.30% from other races, and 0.92% from two or more races. Hispanic or Latino of any race were 1.43% of the population. There are an estimated 2,393 veterans in the town.

There were 13,144 households, out of which 34.9% had children under the age of 18 living with them, 63.4% were married couples living together, 7.4% had a female householder with no husband present, and 26.7% were non-families. 22.3% of all households were made up of individuals, and 8.5% had someone living alone who was 65 years of age or older. The average household size was 2.58 and the average family size was 3.05.

In the town, the population was spread out, with 25.8% under the age of 18, 4.8% from 18 to 24, 27.4% from 25 to 44, 27.0% from 45 to 64, and 14.9% who were 65 years of age or older. The median age was 40 years. For every 100 females, there were 92.3 males. For every 100 females age 18 and over, there were 88.7 males.

The median income for a household in the town was $63,223, and the median income for a family was $74,959. Males had a median income of $52,282 versus $33,365 for females. The per capita income for the town was $29,576. About 2.3% of families and 3.7% of the population were below the poverty line, including 3.9% of those under age 18 and 5.0% of those age 65 or over.

The unemployment rate, as of July 2013, was 5.5%. This is below the 7.6% unemployment rate of New York State in July 2013.

== Communities and locations ==
- East Penfield - a hamlet near the eastern town line on Route 441.
- Lloyd's Corners - a hamlet at the intersection of Routes 441 and 250.
- Panorama - a hamlet at the interchange between Routes 441 & 153, east of the village of Penfield.
- Penfield - the hamlet of Penfield is near the western town line, on Route 441 and Five Mile Line Road.
- Penfield Center - a hamlet at the intersection of Penfield Center Road, Route 250 (Fairport Nine Mile Point Road), and Route 286 (Atlantic Avenue).
- Roseland - a hamlet in the north-eastern corner of the town on Plank Road.

== Economy ==
As with many suburbs of the United States of America, Penfield's workforce co-exists with the major corporations and institutions found in the Rochester metropolitan area. These corporations include Kodak, Xerox, and Bausch & Lomb. Major health, insurance, and educational institutions also contribute to employment and culture, including the University of Rochester, Rochester Institute of Technology, and Rochester Regional Health.

Major public and private corporations with a geographic footprint in Penfield include Paychex, Nalge Nunc International, Birds Eye Foods, and Wegmans.

== Education ==
The town is primarily served by the Penfield Central School District and Webster Central School District, with relatively small portions of the town served by the East Rochester Union Free School District, Pittsford Central School District and Wayne Central School District.

Additionally, there are several privately-run schools:

- Bread of Life Christian Academy (grades K–8), non-denominational Christian
- The Charles Finney School (grades K–12), non-denominational Christian
- Rochester Christian School (grades K–8), Calvinist
- Southeast Christian Academy (grades 1–12), Baptist
- St. Joseph Elementary School (grades K–6), operated by the Roman Catholic Diocese of Rochester
- Webster Montessori School (grades pre-K–5), secular

== Government ==
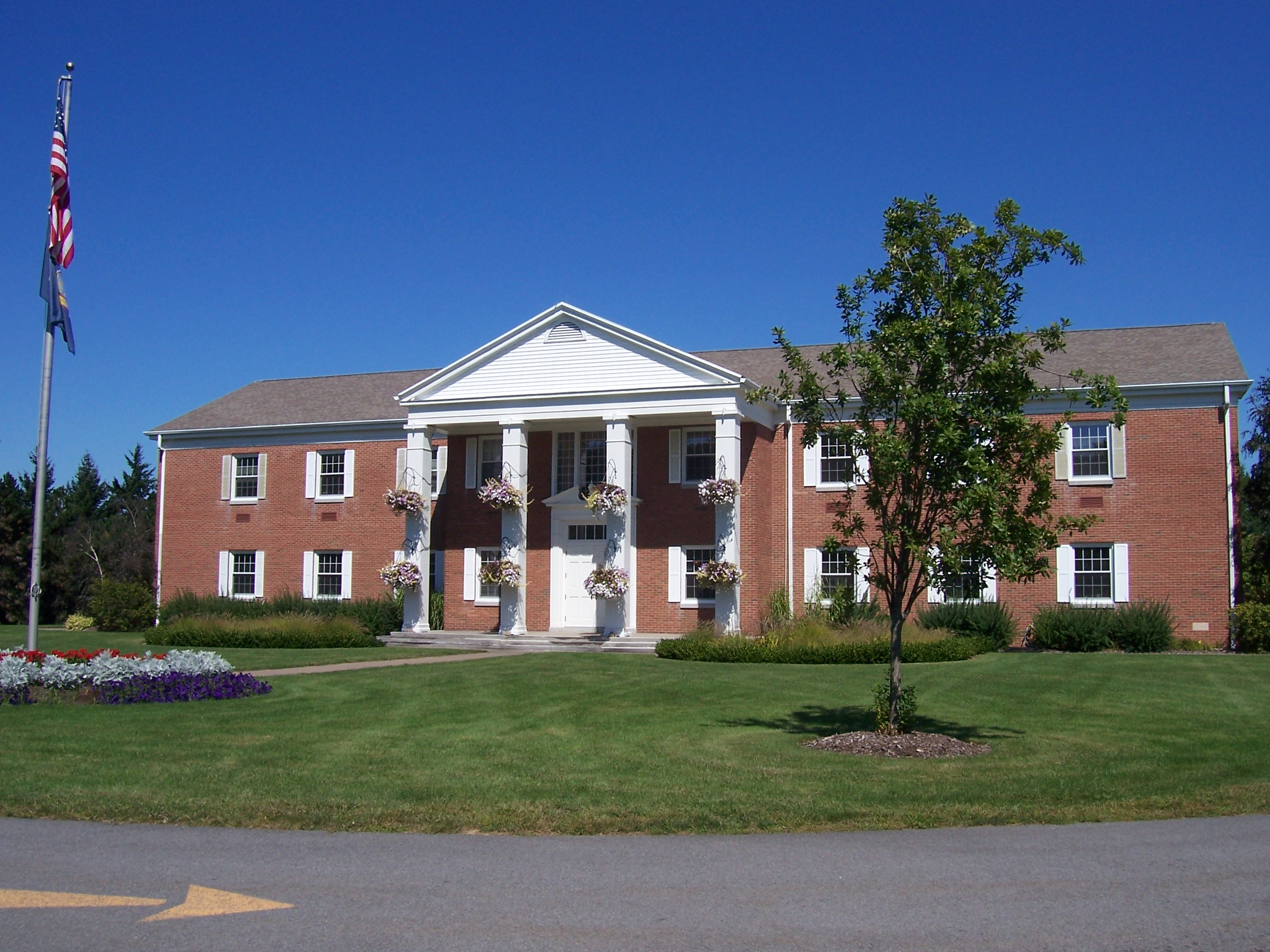
Penfield town hall

The town is governed by a board consisting of a supervisor and four councilpersons who are elected by registered town voters. Major responsibilities can be grouped into planning and preservation, libraries and recreation, ethics and environment, trails and transportation.

Current members of the Town Board

Supervisor: Kevin Berry (Democrat) 2026-present

Councilperson: Catherine Dean (Democrat) - 2026–present
Councilperson: Jon Getz (Democrat) - 2026–present
Councilperson: Bill Lang (Democrat) - 2026–present
Councilperson: Linda Teglash (Democrat) - 2024-present

Two town justices and one town clerk are also elected.

The town court handles approximately 6,000 cases per year, adjudicated by the justices.

== Emergency response ==
There are a few levels of emergency response in Penfield. First-level support is from county and city resources. Second- and third-level support is provided by trained and untrained citizens lending a helping hand.

- First-level support is from county and the city resources. Dialing 911 connects the caller to the city of Rochester's emergency communications department (911 center). For the town of Penfield, the Monroe County sheriff's department provides primary law enforcement for the town's residents.
- Second-level support is from trained town and citizen resources. The Penfield Volunteer Emergency Ambulance provides basic life support with trained emergency medical technicians. Advanced life support services are provided by the Southeast Quadrant Mobile Critical Care Unit. The volunteer Penfield Fire Company provides fire protection, rescue, and non-transport emergency medical services to areas within the Penfield Fire District. Northern parts of Penfield receive the same services from the Webster Fire Department.
- Third-level support is from within the community.

== Notable people ==
- Josh Bolton, soccer player
- Obadiah Bush, abolitionist and ancestor of the Bush family
- Chyna, former pro wrestler
- Velvet D'Amour, fashion model
- Geoffrey Deuel, actor
- Pete Duel, actor
- Robert Forster, actor
- Lou Gramm, Foreigner frontman
- Bud Lewis, soccer player
- Joe Mercik, soccer player
- Edmund Mann Pope, U.S. military officer and Minnesota state senator
- Almon Brown Strowger, inventor of the first automatic telephone exchange
- Daniel Lynd, soccer player
