= Daisy Flour Mill =

- U.S. National Register of Historic Places
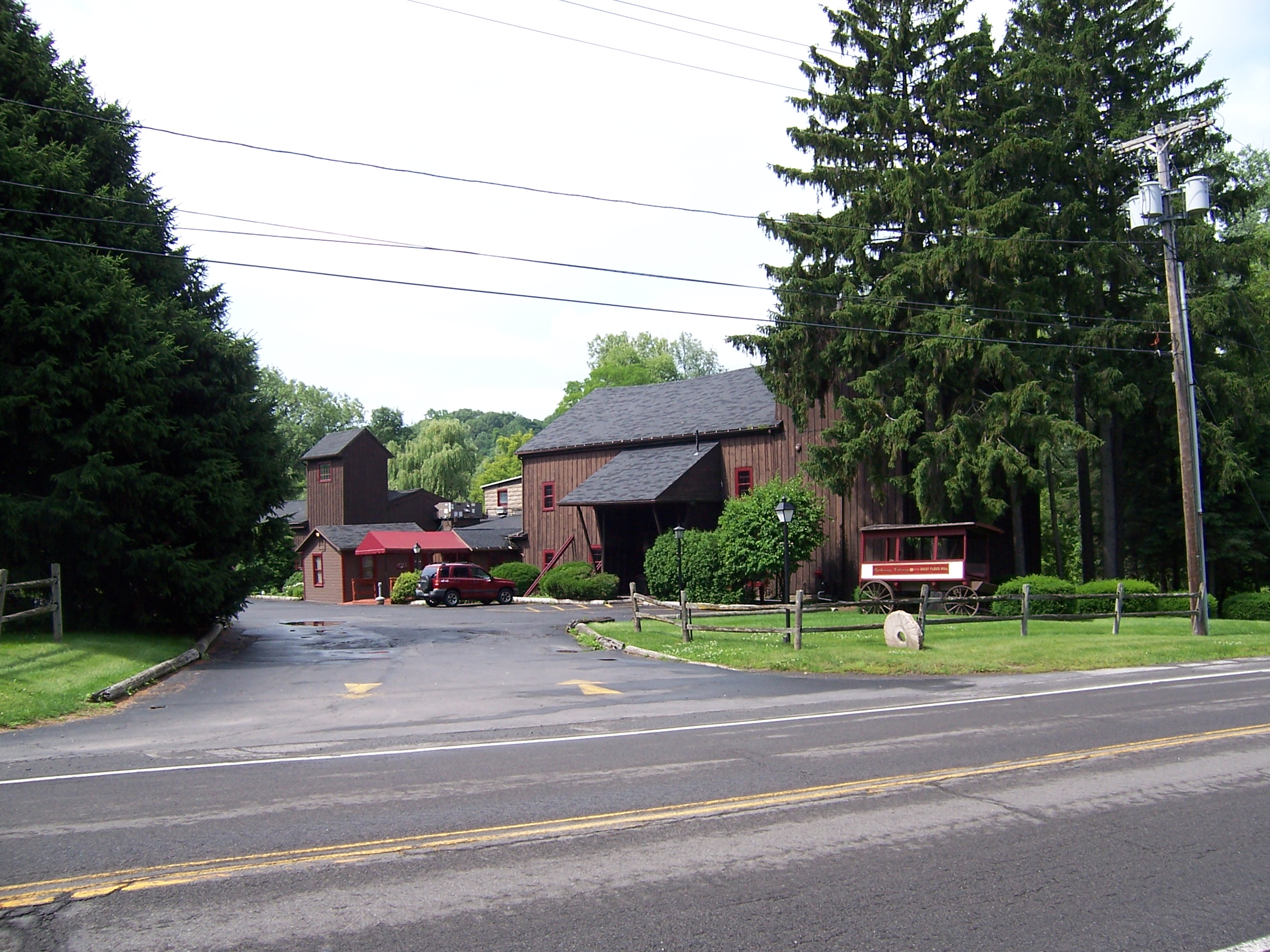

- Location within New York Location within the United States
- Location: 1880 Blossom Rd., Rochester, New York
- Coordinates: 43°8′49″N 77°30′45″W
- Built: 1840
- NRHP reference No.: 72000855
- Added to NRHP: June 26, 1972

The Daisy Flour Mill is a restaurant and assembly hall located in what was once a flour mill on Irondequoit Creek. It is located on Blossom Road in the town of Penfield, New York, just across the creek from Ellison Park. Originally built in 1840, it is the last remaining mill on Irondequoit Creek.

The weatherboard building was added to the National Register of Historic Places on June 26, 1972.
