= Stephen Phelps House =

Historic house in New York, United States

- U.S. National Register of Historic Places
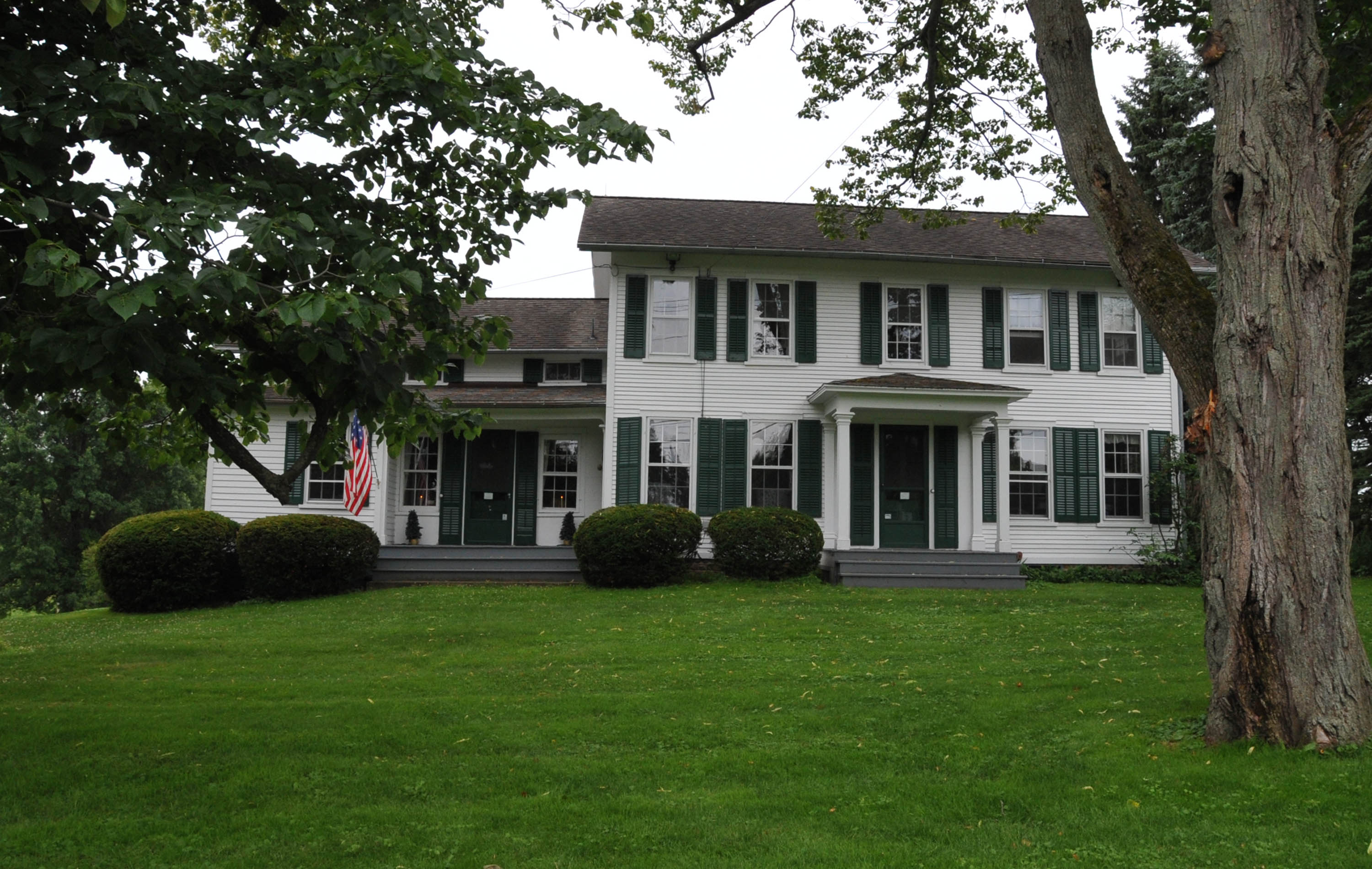

- Location within New York Location within the United States
- Location: 2701 Penfield Rd., Penfield, New York
- Coordinates: 43°7′39″N 77°23′32″W
- Area: 40 acres (16 ha)
- Built: 1814
- Architectural style: Federal
- NRHP reference No.: 94001635
- Added to NRHP: February 2, 1995

The Stephen Phelps House is a historic home located at Penfield in Monroe County, New York. It is a representative example of the vernacular Federal style of architecture from the settlement period. The residence, constructed between 1814 and 1817, is the earliest intact dwelling in the town of Penfield. The frame building consists of a two-story, five-bay, center entrance main block with smaller frame wings.

It was listed on the National Register of Historic Places in 1995.
