= Samuel Rich House =

Historic house in New York, United States

- U.S. National Register of Historic Places
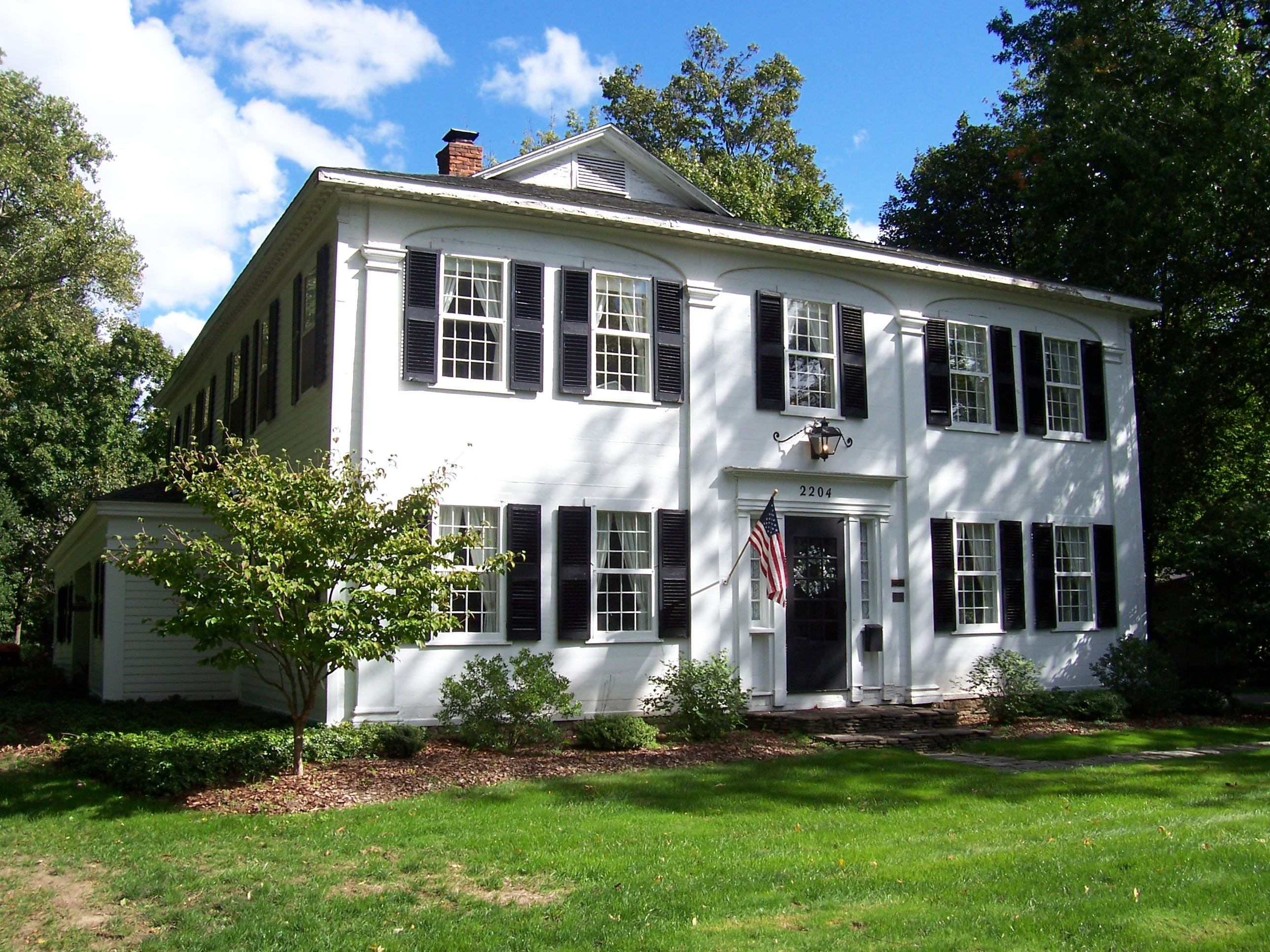
- Samuel Rich House, September 2012

- Location within New York Location within the United States
- Location: 2204 Five Mile Line Rd., Penfield, New York
- Coordinates: 43°7′26″N 77°28′34″W
- Area: 5 acres (2.0 ha)
- Built: 1816; 210 years ago
- Architect: Owen, Calvin
- Architectural style: Federal
- NRHP reference No.: 87002199
- Added to NRHP: December 30, 1987

Samuel Rich House is a historic home located at Penfield in Monroe County, New York. It was originally built in 1816 as a 1 1/2-story, gable-roofed frame dwelling in the rural vernacular building tradition. It was substantially enlarged in 1832 with the addition of an elegant 2-story, five-bay, Federal style, hipped roof, main block. Also on the property are three contributing structures: a chicken coop, brick smokehouse, and the stone foundation of a frame barn.

It was listed on the National Register of Historic Places in 1987.
