= Hipp–Kennedy House =

Historic house in New York, United States

- U.S. National Register of Historic Places
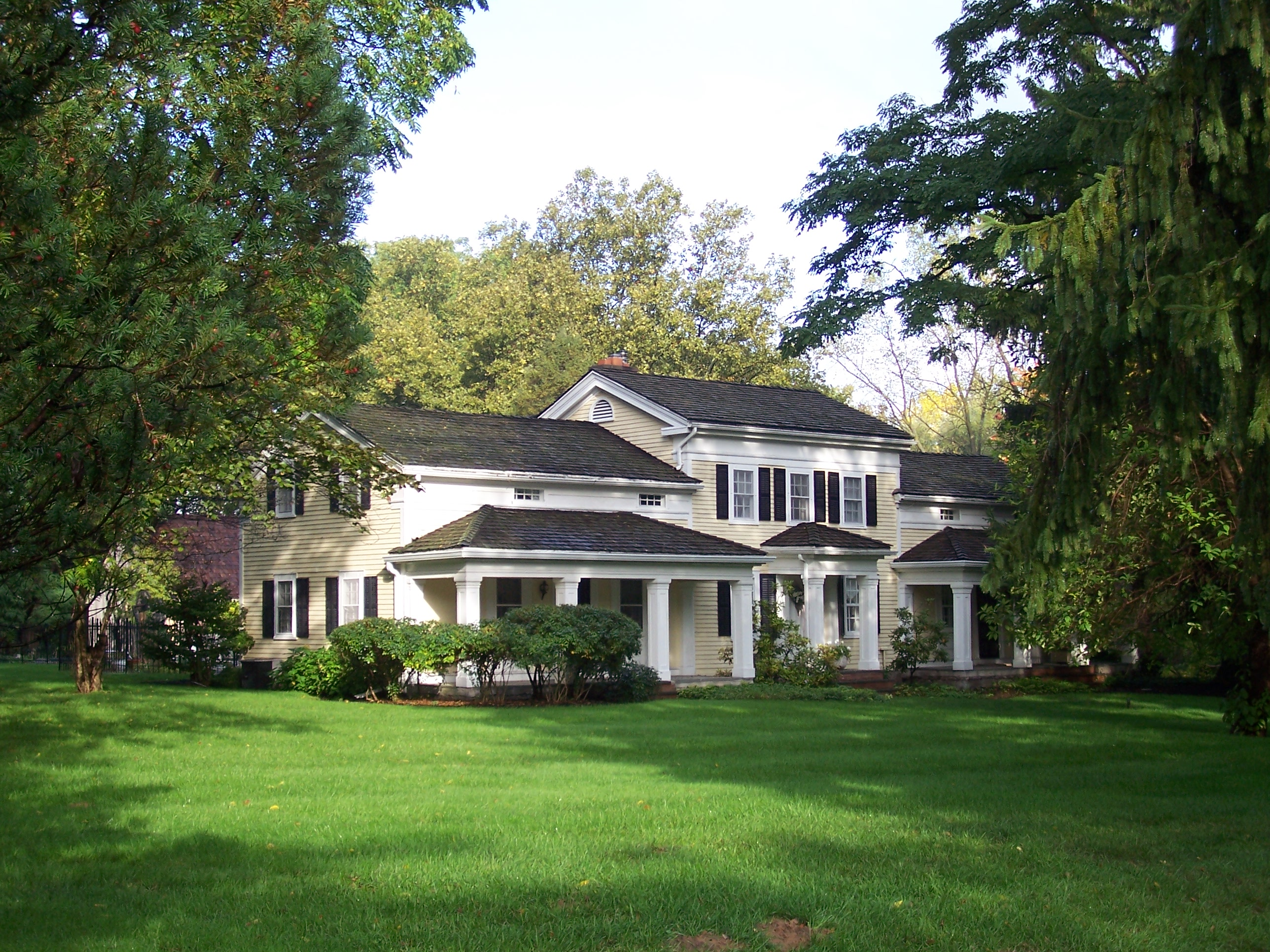
- Hipp–Kennedy House, September 2012

- Location within New York Location within the United States
- Location: 1931 Five Mile Line Road., Penfield, New York
- Coordinates: 43°8′34″N 77°28′35″W
- Area: 4 acres (1.6 ha)
- Built: 1838
- Architectural style: Greek Revival
- NRHP reference No.: 94000003
- Added to NRHP: February 4, 1994

Hipp–Kennedy House is a historic home located at Penfield in Monroe County, New York. The main body of the house was built in 1838 and is in the Greek Revival style. The frame building is composed of a two-story, three-bay main block with center entrance flanked by identical 1 1/2-story wings. The north wing of the residence is believed to incorporate the remnants of a log dwelling built about 1804.

It was designated as a Penfield landmark in 1982 and was listed on the National Register of Historic Places in 1994.
