= Tom Hamburger =

American journalist

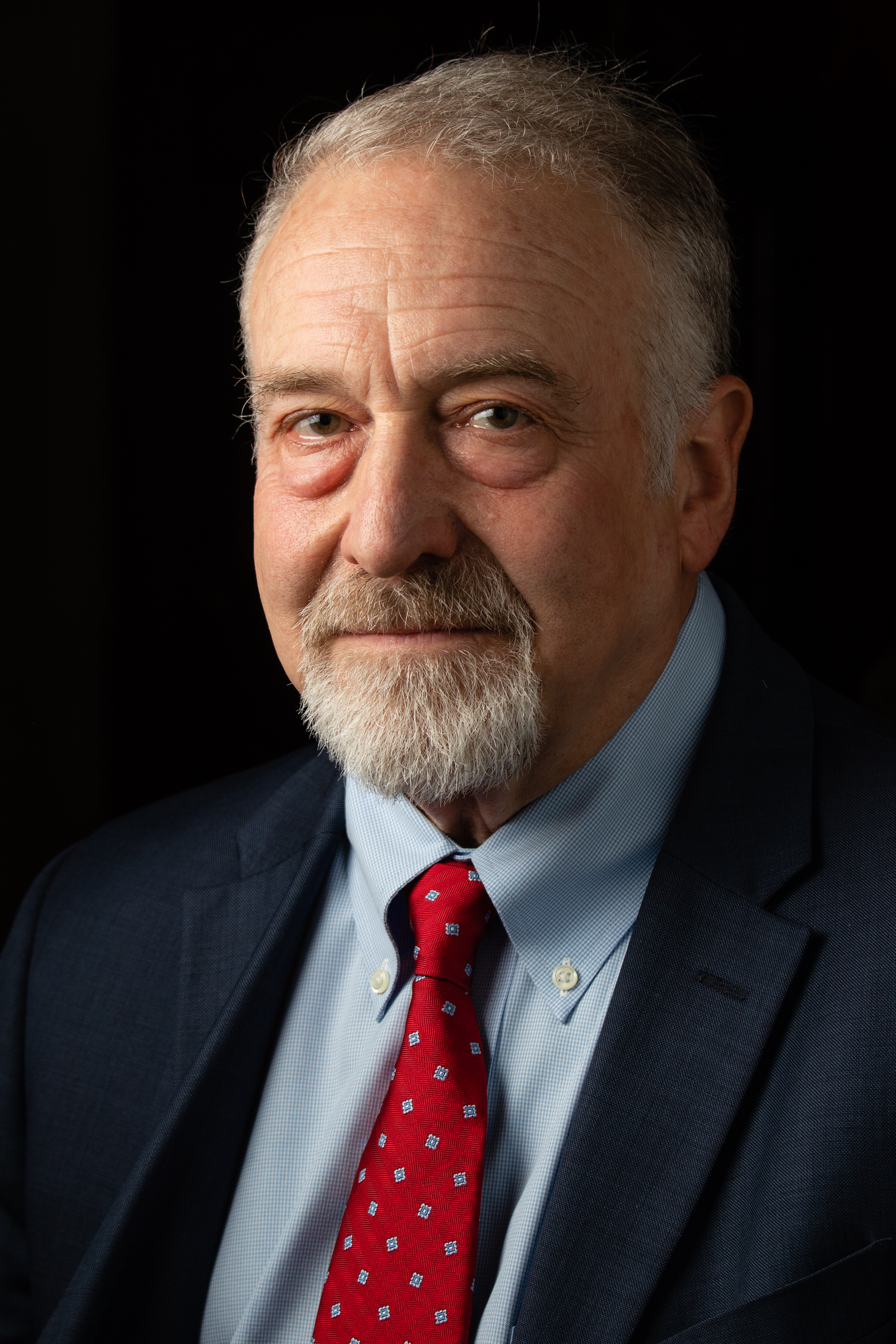
- Education: Oberlin College, Stanford University
- Occupation: Journalist
- Years active: 1976-present
- Employer: The Washington Post

Tom Hamburger is an American journalist. He is an investigative journalist for The Washington Post. He is a 2018 Pulitzer Prize and George Polk Award recipient and a political analyst for MSNBC.

== Education ==
Hamburger was graduated from Brighton High School (Rochester, New York) in the incorporated Town of Brighton, New York in 1970, and was inducted into the school's Hall of Fame in 2019. He received a B.A. in Government and History from Oberlin College in 1974. He then completed the one-year John S. Knight Fellowship at Stanford University.

== Career ==
Hamburger started his career as a reporter Arkansas Gazette in 1976 before joining the Minneapolis Star-Tribune in 1983. After his fellowship at Stanford, Hamburger became Washington Bureau Chief for the Star-Tribune in 1995, and then remained in the post when the paper was acquired by McClatchey in 1998.

Hamburger joined Dow Jones as a money and politics reporter in 2004. He moved to the Los Angeles Times to become Washington correspondent in 2003 until he was appointed a reporter on the national desk at The Washington Post in 2012.

Hamburger reportedly retired from The Washington Post around January 2023.

=== Awards ===
Hamburger has received numerous awards during his career. He won the White House Correspondent Association's Raymond Clapper Memorial Award, and was a finalist for the Goldsmith Award for Investigative Reporting and the Pulitzer Prize for his work on conflict of interest on the federal bench for the Star-Tribune in 1996.

In 2000, he won the National Press Club Consumer Journalism Prize. In 2002, he won the Golden Typewriter Award given by the New York Press Club. In 2006, he won Columbia University's John B. Oakes Award for Distinguished Environmental Journalism.

For his work on President Donald Trump's ties to Russia, Hamburger, alongside other Post reporters, in 2018 won the Pulitzer Prize and the George Polk Award, and was a finalist for the Goldsmith Award for Investigative Reporting.

== See also ==
- Tax returns of Donald Trump
