= Caroline Breese Hall =

American pediatrician (1939–2012)

- Born: April 2, 1939
- Died: December 10, 2012 (aged 73)
- Occupation: Pediatrician
- Spouse: William J. Hall

Academic background
- Education: University of Rochester School of Medicine and Dentistry

Academic work
- Discipline: Pediatrics
- Sub-discipline: Pediatric virology
- Institutions: University of Rochester Medical Center

Caroline Breese Hall (April 2, 1939 – December 10, 2012) was an American pediatrician who was a pediatrics professor at the University of Rochester Medical Center and studied pediatric diseases caused by respiratory syncytial virus and human herpesvirus 6.

== Biography ==
=== Early life and education ===
Caroline Breese Hall, a native of Brighton, Monroe County, New York, was born on April 2, 1939. Her father, Burtis Burr Breese, was a pediatrician who was a professor at the University of Rochester School of Medicine and Dentistry, and the Journal of the Pediatric Infectious Diseases Society described him as "a pioneer in office-based clinical research and the development of the office throat culture for streptococci". After obtaining a BA in chemistry at Wellesley College, she studied at her father's employer, University of Rochester School of Medicine and Dentistry, where she obtained a medical degree in 1964.

=== Academic career ===
After obtaining her degrees, Hall moved to Yale University, where she completed a few fellowships and a residency. In 1971, Hall became part of the University of Rochester Medical Center (URMC) faculty, before becoming Professor of Pediatrics and Medicine there in 1986.

An author of hundreds of scholarly articles, Hall specialized in studying pediatric diseases caused by respiratory syncytial virus and human herpesvirus 6, and Women In Academia Report described her as an expert in the area. The Journal of the Pediatric Infectious Diseases Society described Hall as a "major contributor to the discipline of pediatric infectious diseases, as teacher, mentor, researcher, and counselor". In 1978, Hall and her father wrote a book called Beta Hemolytic Streptococcal Diseases. Hall was one of the inaugural editorial board members of the academic journal Contemporary Pediatrics, remaining there until her death. Hall was the fifth president of the Pediatric Infectious Diseases Society. Hall served on the Advisory Committee on Immunization Practices and was the chair of the American Academy of Pediatrics' Committee on Infectious Diseases.

In 1979, Hall became a Fellow of the American Academy of Pediatrics and a Fellow of the Royal College of Physicians of Edinburgh. Hall was the Infectious Diseases Society of America's 1993 John F. Enders Lecturer. In 1995, Hall became the first winner of the Pediatric Infectious Diseases Society Foundation's Distinguished Service Award. Hall won the Pan American Society of Virology's 1997 Ed Nowakowski Senior Memorial Clinical Virology Award. In 2002, Hall was elected to the National Academy of Medicine. Hall won the 2006 American Academy of Pediatrics' Section on Infectious Diseases Award for Lifetime Contribution in Infectious Diseases Education. Hall won the 2008 Robert M. Chanock Award for Lifetime Achievement.

=== Personal life, death, and legacy ===
Hall and her husband William J. Hall, the Paul H. Fine Professor of Medicine at the URMC, had three children including URMC cardiology professor Burr W. Hall.

Hall died at her home on December 10, 2012; she was 73. In April 2014, the URMC held a festschrift symposium in Hall's honor.

== Bibliography ==
- Breese, Burtis B.; Hall, Caroline Breese (1978). Beta Hemolytic Streptococcal Diseases. Houghton Mifflin Professional Publishers, Medical Division. ISBN 978-0-89289-400-0.
