= Mud House =

Historic house in New York, United States

- U.S. National Register of Historic Places
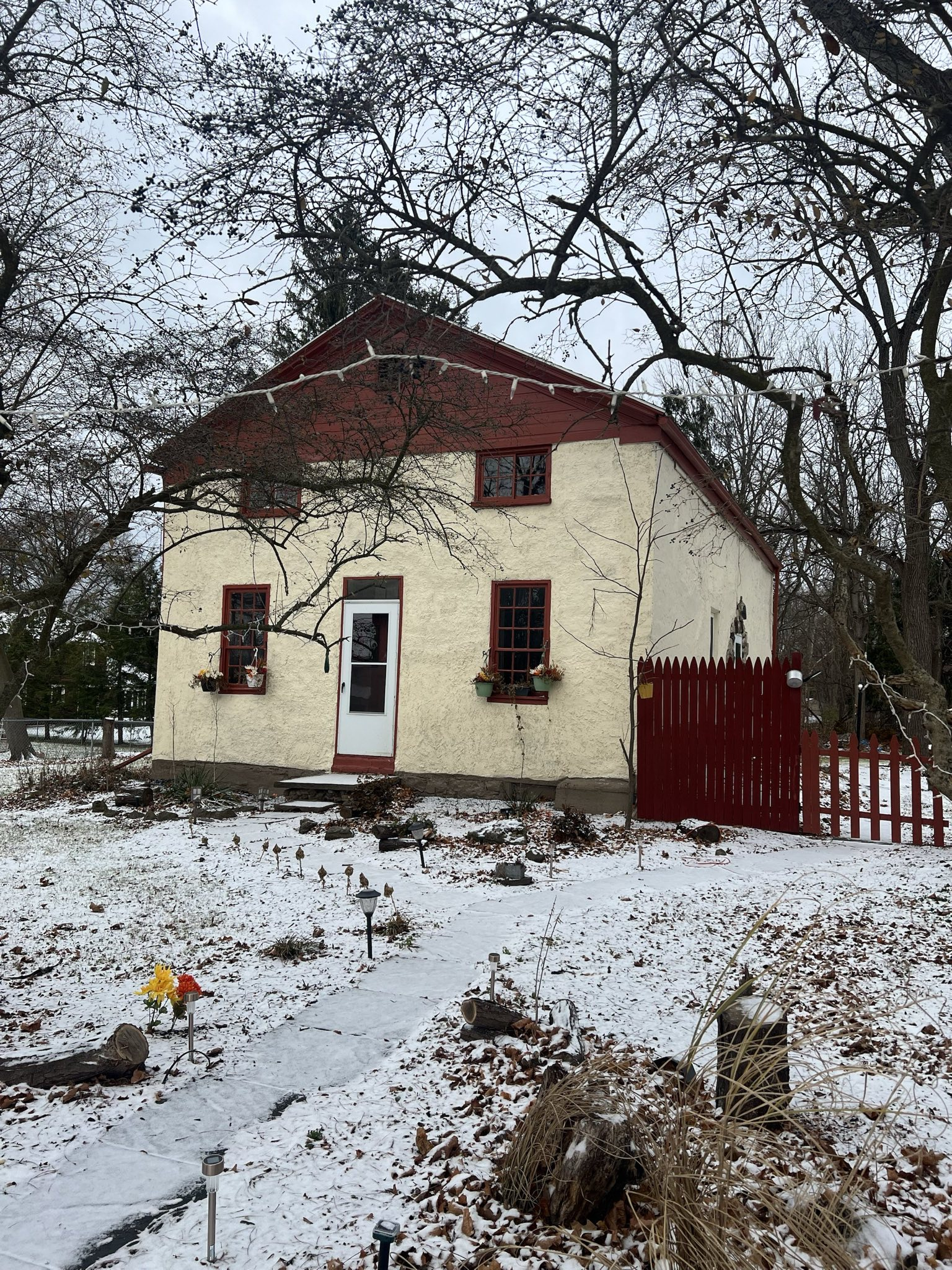
- Mud House, December 2023

- Location within New York Location within the United States
- Location: 992 Whalen Rd., Penfield, New York
- Coordinates: 43°8′31″N 77°27′36″W
- Area: 4 acres (1.6 ha)
- Built: 1836
- Architect: Gors, William
- NRHP reference No.: 78001862
- Added to NRHP: October 11, 1978

The Mud House is a historic home located at Penfield in Monroe County, New York. It is a 1 1/2-story, 24-by-38-foot (7.3 by 11.6 m) rectangular earthen building with gable roof. It was constructed about 1836 of clay, puddled with straw, and then rammed into forms above a fieldstone foundation and is a rare surviving example of rammed-earth construction and was part of the Brown Brothers Nursery owned by Don Brown.

It was listed on the National Register of Historic Places in 1978.
