= Harvey Whalen House =

Historic house in New York, United States

- U.S. National Register of Historic Places
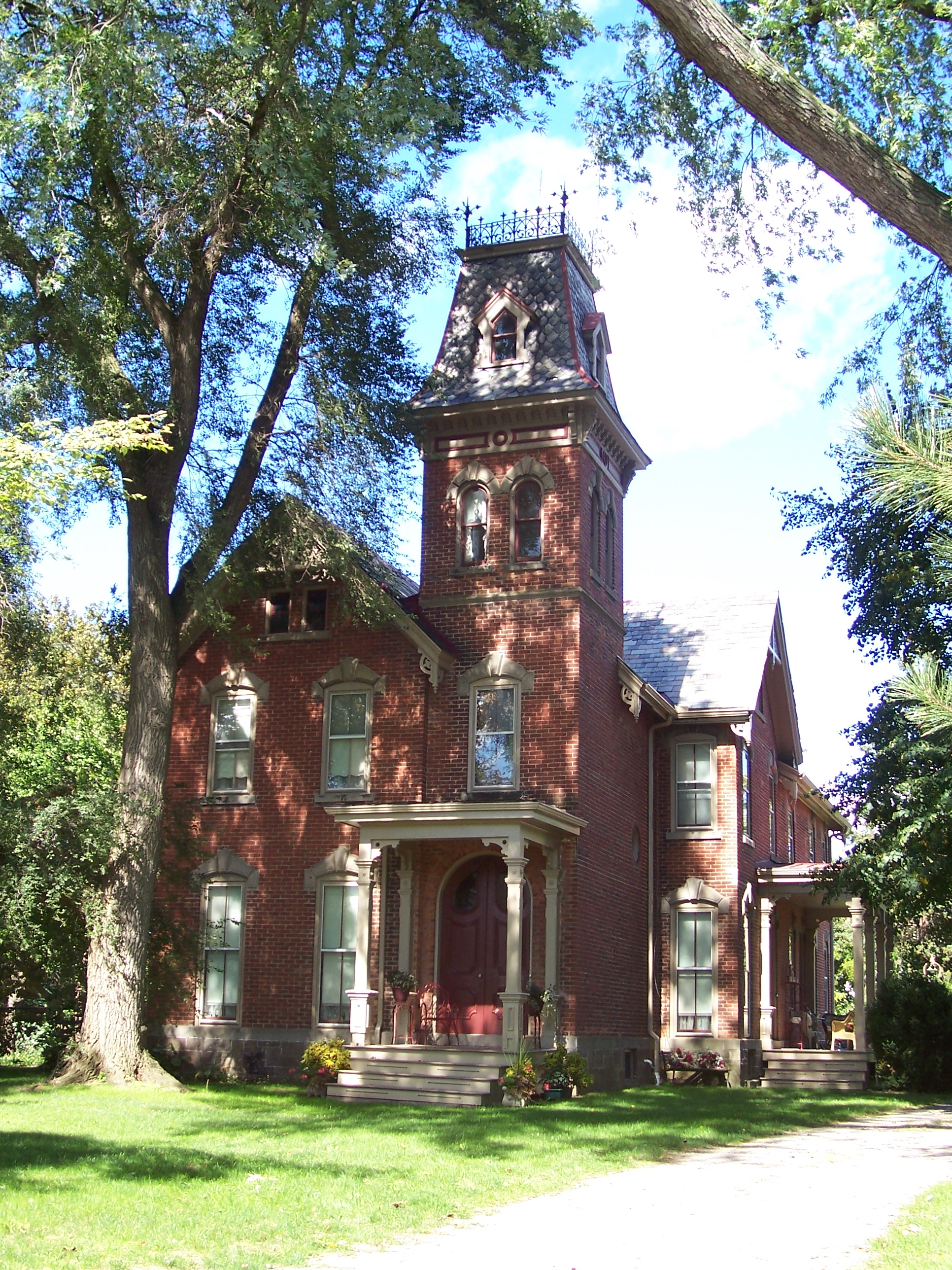
- Harvey Whalen House, September 2012

- Location within New York Location within the United States
- Location: 1140 Whalen Road, Penfield, New York
- Coordinates: 43°8′29″N 77°26′45″W
- Area: 1.2 acres (0.49 ha)
- Built: 1875
- Architectural style: Second Empire, Gothic
- NRHP reference No.: 94001342
- Added to NRHP: November 21, 1994

Harvey Whalen House is a historic home located in the town of Penfield in Monroe County, New York. The brick building, constructed in 1875, consists of a 2 1/2-story, three-bay, Victorian Gothic main block with attached Second Empire tower and 1-story brick addition. Also on the property are three contributing structures; two barns (now garages) and a shed.

It was listed on the National Register of Historic Places in 1994.

Harvey Whalen, a farmer and Penfield town Poormaster, left the house and surrounding Maple Hill Farm to his sons. Of the three sons (Howard, Charles, and H. Wilson Whalen), two went on to serve terms as Penfield town supervisor. Later owners included the Footer family and the Simonetti family.
