= Horace and Grace Bush House =

Historic house in New York, United States

- U.S. National Register of Historic Places
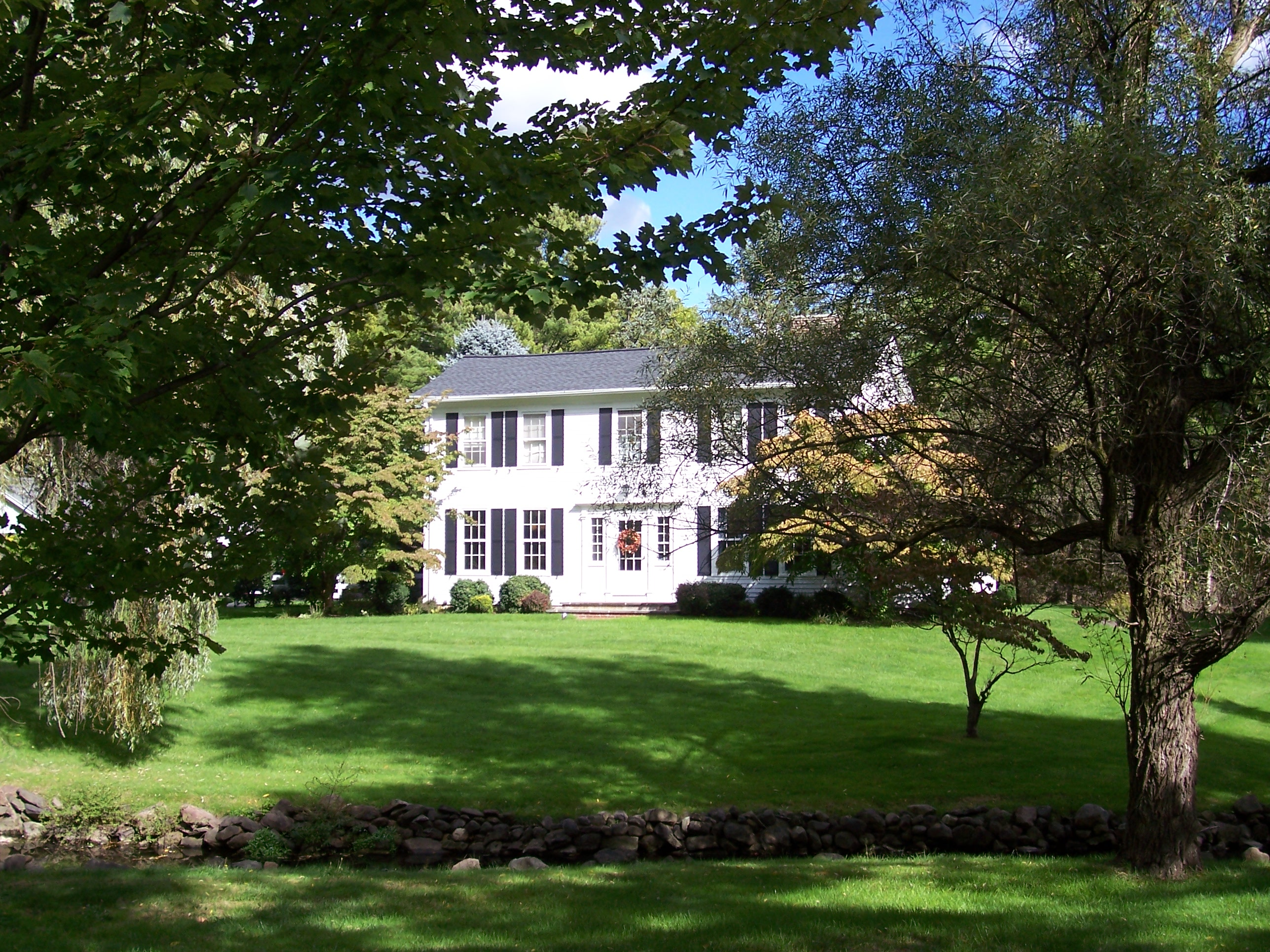
- Horace and Grace Bush House, September 2012

- Location within New York Location within the United States
- Location: 1932 Five Mile Line Rd., Penfield, New York
- Coordinates: 43°8′33″N 77°28′36″W
- Area: 2 acres (0.81 ha)
- Built: 1821
- Architect: Owen, Calvin
- Architectural style: Federal
- NRHP reference No.: 94000590
- Added to NRHP: June 10, 1994

Horace and Grace Bush House, also known as Bush-Fellows Residence, is a historic home located at Penfield in Monroe County, New York. It is an 1821 Federal style structure with Greek Revival period additions and embellishments. The main block is a two-story, five bay post and beam structure sheathed in clapboard. It is regular and symmetrical in massing and plan. The house was moved to its current location in 1931.

It was listed on the National Register of Historic Places in 1994.

== Gallery ==
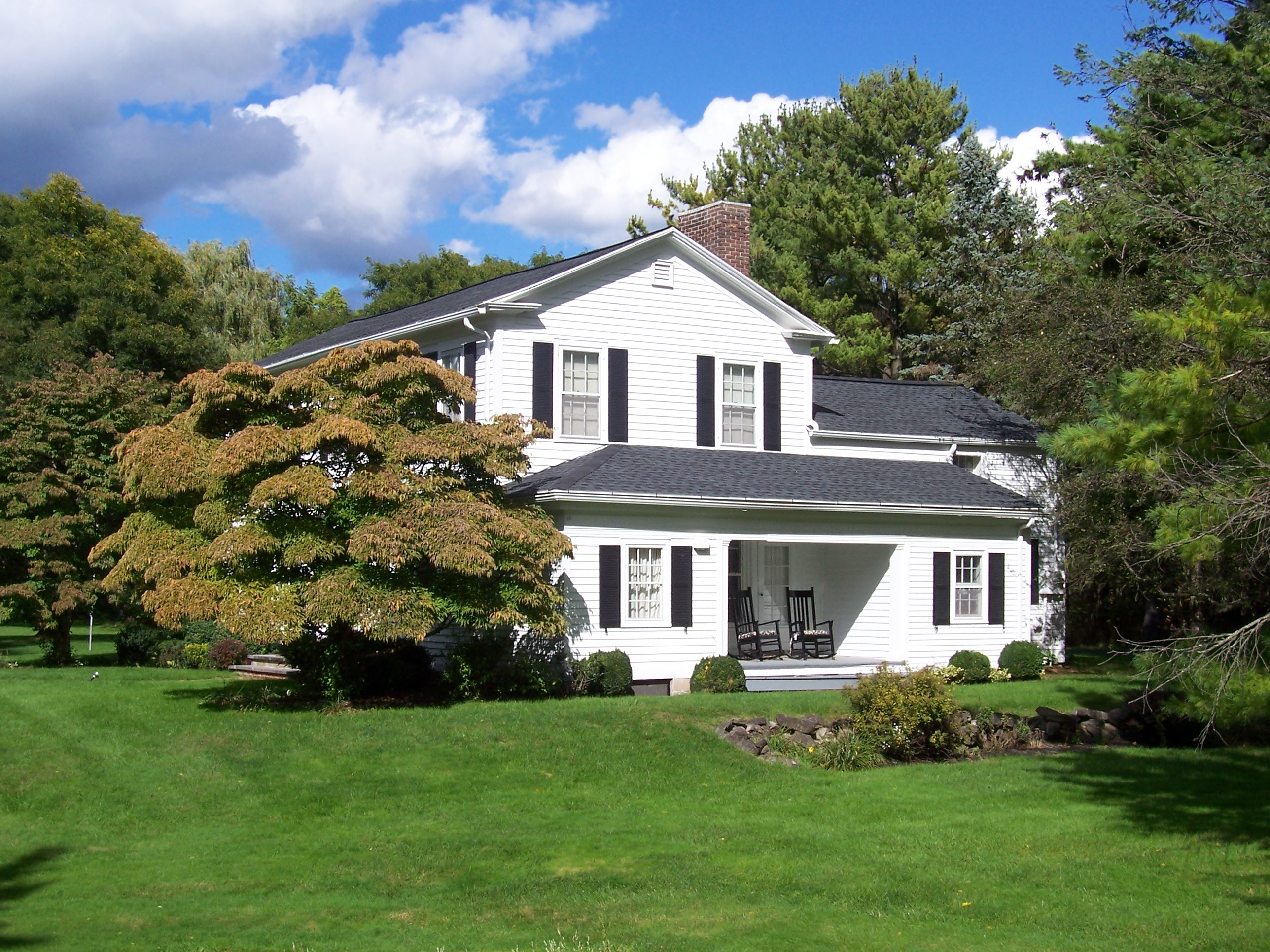
View from Whalen Road in Penfield
