= Brighton, Monroe County, New York =

Brighton, New York
- Town
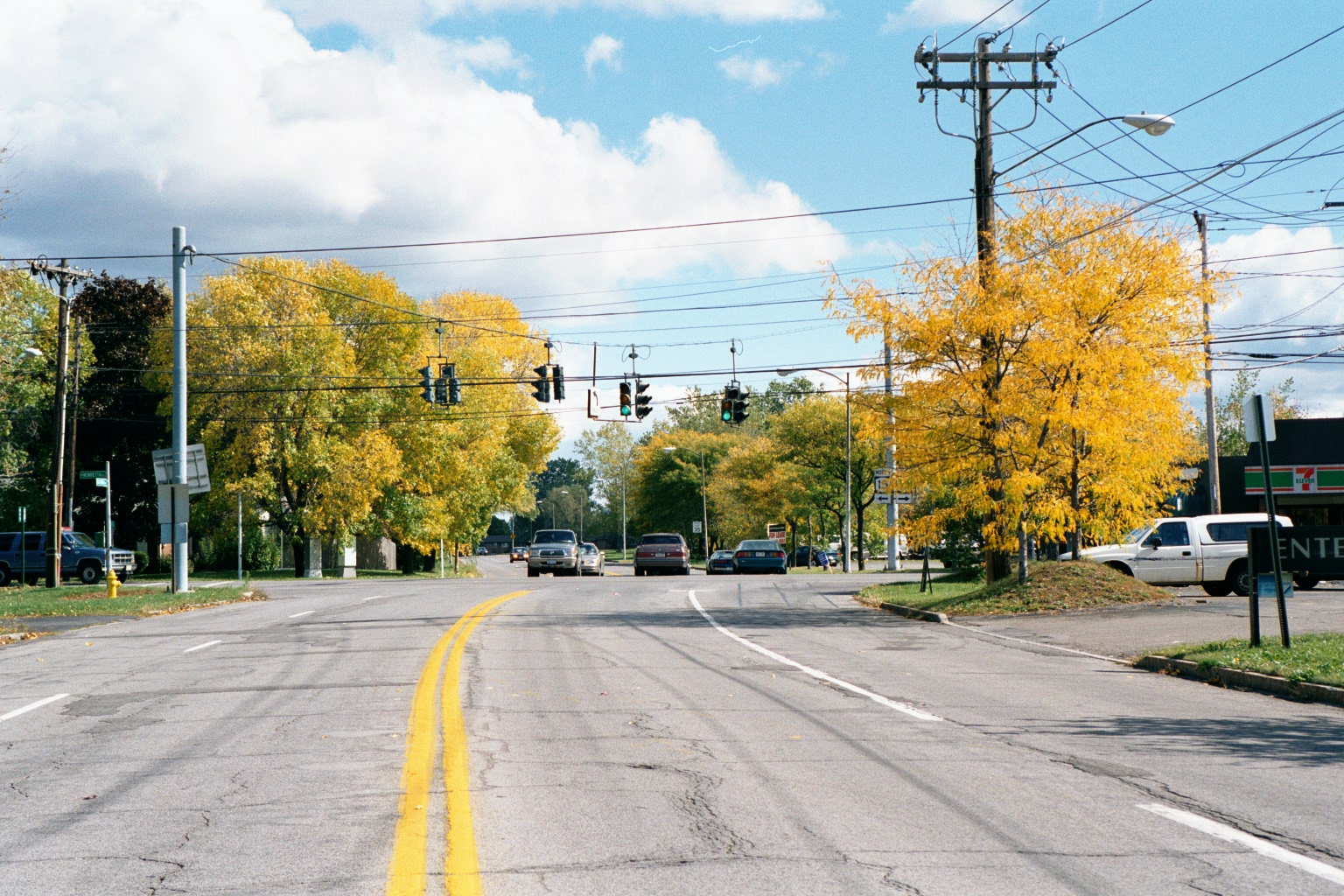
- Intersection of Crittenden Road with West Henrietta Road (2001)

- Location in Monroe County and the state of New York

- Location of New York in the United States
- Coordinates: 43°07′24″N 77°34′05″W
- Country: United States
- State: New York
- County: Monroe
- Established: March 25, 1814; 212 years ago

Government
  - Town supervisor: William Moehle (D) first elected 2011 Town council: Nathaniel V. Salzman (D); Clara Sanguinetti (D); Christine E. Corrado (D); Christopher K. Werner (D)

Area
  - Total: 15.60 sq mi (40.4 km^{2})
  - Land: 15.41 sq mi (39.9 km^{2})
  - Water: 0.19 sq mi (0.49 km^{2})
- Elevation: 493 ft (150 m)

Population (2020)
  - Total: 37,137 ▲
  - Density: 2,409.93/sq mi (930.48/km^{2})
- Time zone: UTC-5 (EST)
  - Summer (DST): UTC-4 (EDT)
- ZIP Codes: 14610-14618-14620-14623-14625
- Area code: 585
- FIPS code: 36-055-08246
- Website: www.brightonny.gov

Brighton is a town and census-designated place in Monroe County, New York, United States. The population was 37,137 at the 2020 census.

== History ==
The town of Brighton, located on the southeastern border of the city of Rochester, is located on the traditional homelands of the Onöndowa'ga:' (Seneca), part of the Ho-de-no-sau-nee-ga (Haudenosaunee) Confederacy, the People of the Long House, called Iroquois by the French. The first Europeans in the area were French trappers in the seventeenth century, who visited frequently but did not settle there. English colonists built permanent structures in approximately 1790, and formally established the town in 1814—earning it recognition as one of the oldest towns in Monroe County. Named for Brighton, England, it remained a farming and brick-making community until the 20th century, when the town began its evolution into an upscale suburban residential area, occupying some 15 square miles (39 km^{2}).

During the Civil War the men of Brighton helped form Company D of the 140th New York Volunteer Infantry Regiment in September 1862, which included Rochester. The total population of Brighton at the time was approximately 3,100. The 140th New York Regiment served in the XII Corps and then the V Corps of the Army of the Potomac. They saw battle during the battles of Gettysburg, the Wilderness, and Spotsylvania Court House, as well as the Appomattox campaign during the war. The 140th New York was disbanded from service on June 3, 1865.

The Alcoa Care-free Home and Stone-Tolan House are listed on the National Register of Historic Places.

In 1999, the town purchased 64 acres (26 ha) with the intention of developing a central park.

== Geography ==
Brighton is in central Monroe County, bordered to the north and northwest by the city of Rochester. According to the U.S. Census Bureau, the town of Brighton has a total area of 15.6 square miles (40 km^{2}), of which 0.2 square miles (0.5 km^{2}), or 1.23%, are water.

Brighton has lacked a central village since the city of Rochester annexed the area around East Avenue and Winton Road, formerly the village of Brighton, in 1905. The central entertainment and commercial hub is the Twelve Corners, so named because three intersecting roads, Winton Road, Monroe Avenue and Elmwood Avenue, define twelve distinct corners. Residents tend to gravitate to nearby Pittsford Plaza for shopping, as well as Eastview Mall and Commons, in bordering Pittsford and nearby Victor. The town's high school (Brighton High School) and middle school (Twelve Corners Middle School) are located at Twelve Corners. Brighton is bordered by the city of Rochester to the northwest, by the town of Irondequoit for a very short distance to the north, the town of Henrietta to the south, the Genesee River and Chili to the west, the town of Pittsford to the southeast, and the town of Penfield to the east. Brighton is located some 70 miles (113 km) east of Buffalo and 80 miles (129 km) west of Syracuse. The Erie Canal courses through Brighton, accompanied by the acclaimed Erie Canal Heritage Trail, one of the longest continuous stretches of maintained off-road trail in the United States.

The Pinnacle Hill Range, a line of glacially-formed hills of unique habitat including old-growth oak woodland, is largely leveled or otherwise destroyed, but does have degraded remnants on Pinnacle Hill and the east side of Cobbs Hill. The latter is dedicated as Washington Grove and very popularly used; the former is the highest (though eroded) peak in Rochester and mainly used for unregulated mountain biking with an extensive and wide network of trails on its steep, sandy slopes. The largest wetland in Brighton is a former clay-mining operation filled with lesser cattails along the Brickyard Trail, recently made a park in 2017. A fairly large area of west Brighton is undeveloped and wooded, including Lynch Woods Nature Park, from which one can access the Lehigh Valley Trail, which extends to Victor in the east and Rush to the west, and connects to the Genesee Valley Greenway, Auburn Trail, and Erie Canal trails. Most of Brighton however is completely developed, consisting of asphalt and lawn geography.

== Demographics ==
Historical population
| Census | Pop. | Note | %± |
|---|---|---|---|
| 1820 | 1,972 | | — |
| 1830 | 6,238 | | 216.3% |
| 1840 | 2,336 | | −62.6% |
| 1850 | 3,117 | | 33.4% |
| 1860 | 3,138 | | 0.7% |
| 1870 | 4,304 | | 37.2% |
| 1880 | 3,736 | | −13.2% |
| 1890 | 4,533 | | 21.3% |
| 1900 | 3,815 | | −15.8% |
| 1910 | 3,908 | | 2.4% |
| 1920 | 3,027 | | −22.5% |
| 1930 | 9,065 | | 199.5% |
| 1940 | 13,132 | | 44.9% |
| 1950 | 18,036 | | 37.3% |
| 1960 | 27,849 | | 54.4% |
| 1970 | 35,065 | | 25.9% |
| 1980 | 35,776 | | 2.0% |
| 1990 | 34,455 | | −3.7% |
| 2000 | 35,588 | | 3.3% |
| 2010 | 36,609 | | 2.9% |
| 2020 | 37,137 | | 1.4% |
U.S. Decennial Census 2020

For statistical purposes, the entire town is listed by the U.S. Census Bureau as the Brighton census-designated place. As of the 2020 census, there were 37,137 people residing in the coterminous town-CDP.

As of the census of 2000, there were 35,588 people, 15,854 households, and 8,687 families residing in the town. The population density was 2,302.5 inhabitants per square mile (889.0/km^{2}). There were 16,705 housing units at an average density of 417.2 persons/km^{2} (1,080.8 persons/sq mi). The racial makeup of the town was 86.09% White, 8.13% Asian, 3.70% African American, 1.33% from two or more races, 0.10% Native American, 0.03% Pacific Islander and 0.63% from other races. Hispanic or Latino of any race were 2.34% of the population.

There were 15,854 households, out of which 24.7% had children under the age of 18 living with them, 45.9% were married couples living together, 6.8% have a woman whose husband does not live with her, and 45.2% were non-families. 36.3% of all households were made up of individuals, and 13.8% had someone living alone who was 65 years of age or older. The average household size was 2.14 and the average family size was 2.86.

In the town, the population was spread out, with 20.0% under the age of 18, 7.5% from 18 to 24, 29.9% from 25 to 44, 23.4% from 45 to 64, and 19.1% who were 65 years of age or older. The median age was 40 years. For every 100 females, there were 88.8 males. For every 100 females age 18 and over, there were 84.9 males.

The median income for a household in the town was $91,345 and the median income for a family was $112,125. Males had a median income of $75,670 versus $49,299 for females. The per capita income for the town was $40,500. 6.1% of the population and 3.0% of families were below the poverty line. Out of the total people living in poverty, 4.9% are under the age of 18 and 5.2% are 65 or older.

== Education ==
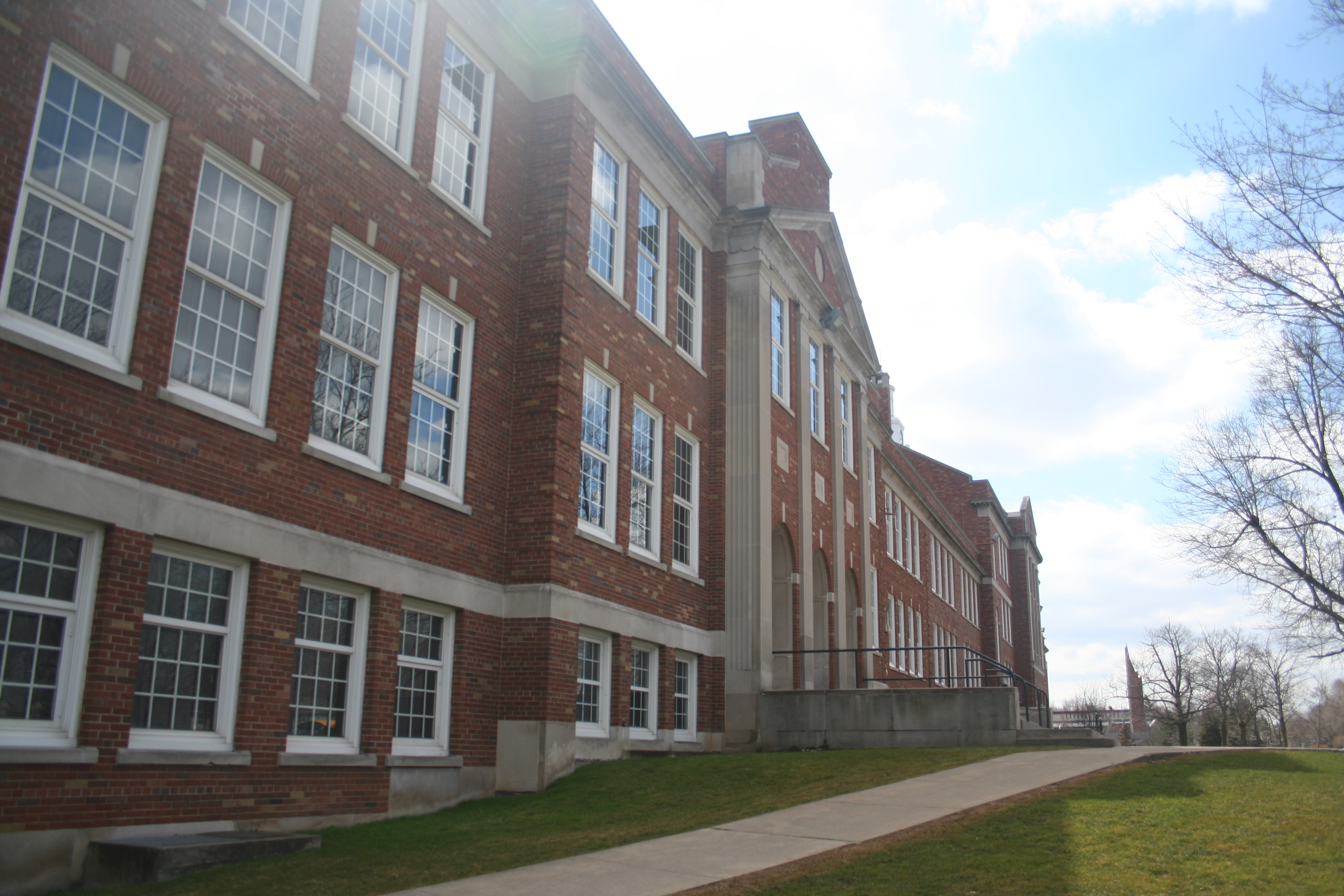
Brighton High School, the only public high school in Brighton

Much of the town of Brighton is served by the Brighton Central School District, which frequently earns high positions in Newsweek national rankings (5th in 1998). Very recently, the ratings have gone down, possibly because some of the school teachers in Brighton have retired or because of increased emphasis on APs in other schools. In 2007, Brighton placed higher (87th) than its cross-town rival, Pittsford Mendon High School (94th) for the first time in several years.

Brighton was recently ranked #56 out of over 18,000 in the inaugural U.S. News & World Report ranking of U.S. high schools (2007), which is generally regarded as having more breadth of analysis than the Newsweek rankings. (The former rankings are formed based upon numerous quantifiable factors, whereas the Newsweek rankings solely examine the raw number of students enrolled in AP classes per capita.) No other school in Monroe County placed in the top 1,000, including, most notably, cross-town rival Pittsford Mendon High School. In 2019, Brighton High School was ranked #786 nationally by U.S. News & World Report.

In 2006, Twelve Corners Middle School received the "Schools to Watch" award, and again was recertified in 2009, 2012, 2015, and 2018. It is one of only ten Middle Schools in New York to receive the "Schools to Watch" award.

Other portions of Brighton are served by other school districts:

- Most of the northeastern part of the town is served by the Penfield Central School District.
- Some of the northeastern and eastern part of the town is served by the Pittsford Central School District.
- Most of the western part of the town is served by the Rush–Henrietta Central School District.
- The extreme western part of the town is served by the Wheatland–Chili Central School District.

Private schools located in Brighton include the Harley School, McQuaid Jesuit High School, Our Lady of Mercy School for Young Women, St. Thomas More School, and Seton Catholic School. Former schools include the Allen Creek School (annexed by Pittsford Central School District in 1958), Brighton Common School No. 4 (annexed by Rush–Henrietta Central School District in 1954 and later renamed Austin Crittenden School), Indian Landing School (annexed by Penfield Central School District in 1954), and St. Agnes High School (1954–1982).

Brighton is also home to the main campus of Monroe Community College and auxiliary campuses of Empire State University, Medaille College, and the University of Rochester.

== Library ==
The Brighton Memorial Library, located on 2300 Elmwood Avenue in the town hall campus, serves Brighton, New York.

== Government ==
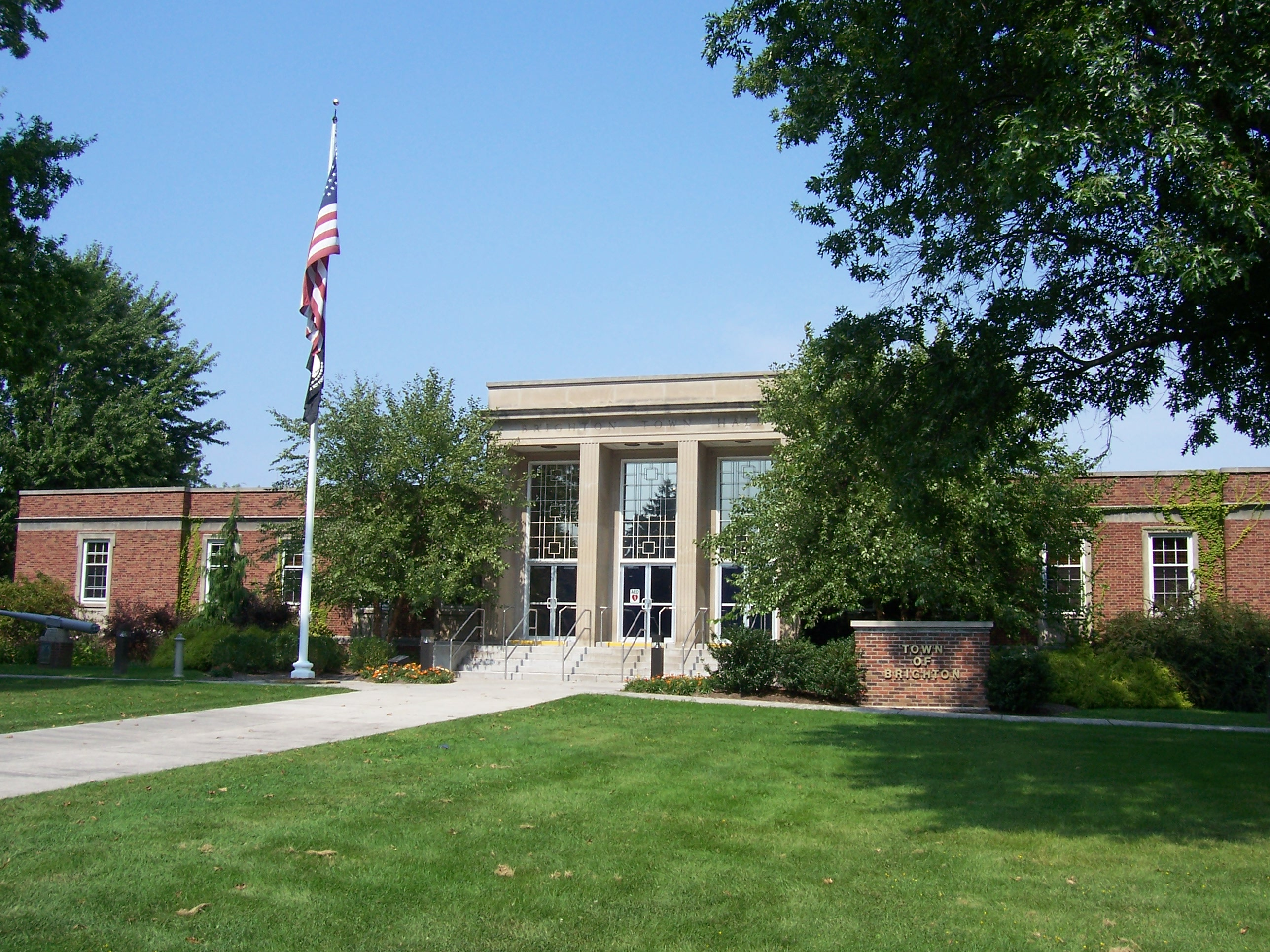
Brighton town hall

Brighton is governed by an elected town board, consisting of a supervisor and four town board members. The supervisor is elected to a two-year term and is the chief financial officer of the municipality and chairperson of the town board. The board members serve four-year terms. Voters also elect two town justices and a town clerk. Town justices serve four-year terms, and the clerk is elected to a two-year term.

== Notable people ==
- Charles August, founder of Monro Muffler Brake
- Al Cervi, basketball hall-of-famer
- Ernie Clement, baseball player
- David Diamond, composer of classical music
- Frederick Douglass (1818–1895), social reformer, orator, writer, statesman, leader in the Underground Railroad
- Winston Duke, actor (Black Panther and Avengers: Infinity War)
- Dana Fox, screenwriter (The Wedding Date)
- Walter Hagen (1892–1969), "Golf's Greatest Showman", world golf hall-of-famer, won 11 Majors
- Caroline Breese Hall, pediatric virologist
- Howard Hanson, composer
- Shirley Jackson (1916–1965), author of The Lottery
- David Cay Johnston, Pulitzer Prize-winning New York Times reporter
- David T. Kearns, former Xerox CEO, former deputy secretary of education
- Robert L. King, former assemblyman, former Monroe County executive, former chancellor of the State University of New York
- Heidi "Hudson" Leick, Xena: Warrior Princess actress, played "Callisto"
- Jenna Marbles, YouTube personality, entertainer
- Linda Sue Park, Newbery award-winning author
- Arthur Schneider, four-time Emmy Award winning television editor
- Kristen Wiig, actress (Saturday Night Live and Bridesmaids)
