= Joe Mercik =

American soccer player

Joe Mercik (born c. 1975) is an American former professional footballer who played for the Rochester Rhinos among other teams. He graduated from Penfield High School in 1993 and went to the University at Buffalo. Following his college soccer career, he was signed by and played for the Rhinos, before leaving the United States to play in Germany. He returned to the USL, playing for the Cincinnati Riverhawks.
