= Penfield Central School District =

School district in the U.S. state of New York

Location
- 2590 Atlantic Ave; Penfield, NY 14526 Monroe County, New York United States
- Coordinates: 43.1542°N 77.4941°W

District information
- Type: Public
- Grades: Pre-K-12 and adult education
- Established: 1948
- Superintendent: Thomas Putnam
- Schools: Four elementary schools (K–5); One middle school (6–8); One senior high school (9–12)
- Budget: ▲US$102.6 million (2020-2021)
- NCES District ID: 3622710

Students and staff
- Students: 4,610 (2025-2026)
- Teachers: 426 (2025-2026)
- Staff: 477 (2020-2021)

Other information
- Unions: NYSUT, Penfield Education Association
- Website: www.penfield.edu

The Penfield Central School District is a public school district in New York State that serves approximately 4,600 students in portions of the towns of Penfield, Brighton, Perinton and Pittsford in Monroe County, and Macedon and Walworth in Wayne County, with approximately 900 employees and an operating budget of $102.6 million (~ $21,445 per student).

The average class size is 23 for grades K–2, 24 for grades 3–5, and 25 for grades 6–12.

== Schools ==
Penfield Central School District consists of six schools. Five schools are located in Penfield, NY and Indian Landing Elementary School is located in Rochester, NY.

=== Elementary schools (K-5) ===
- Cobbles Elementary School
- Harris Hill Elementary School
- Indian Landing Elementary School
- Scribner Road Elementary School

=== Middle school (6-8) ===
- Bay Trail Middle School

=== High school (9-12) ===
- Penfield High School
