= Brighton High School (Rochester, New York) =

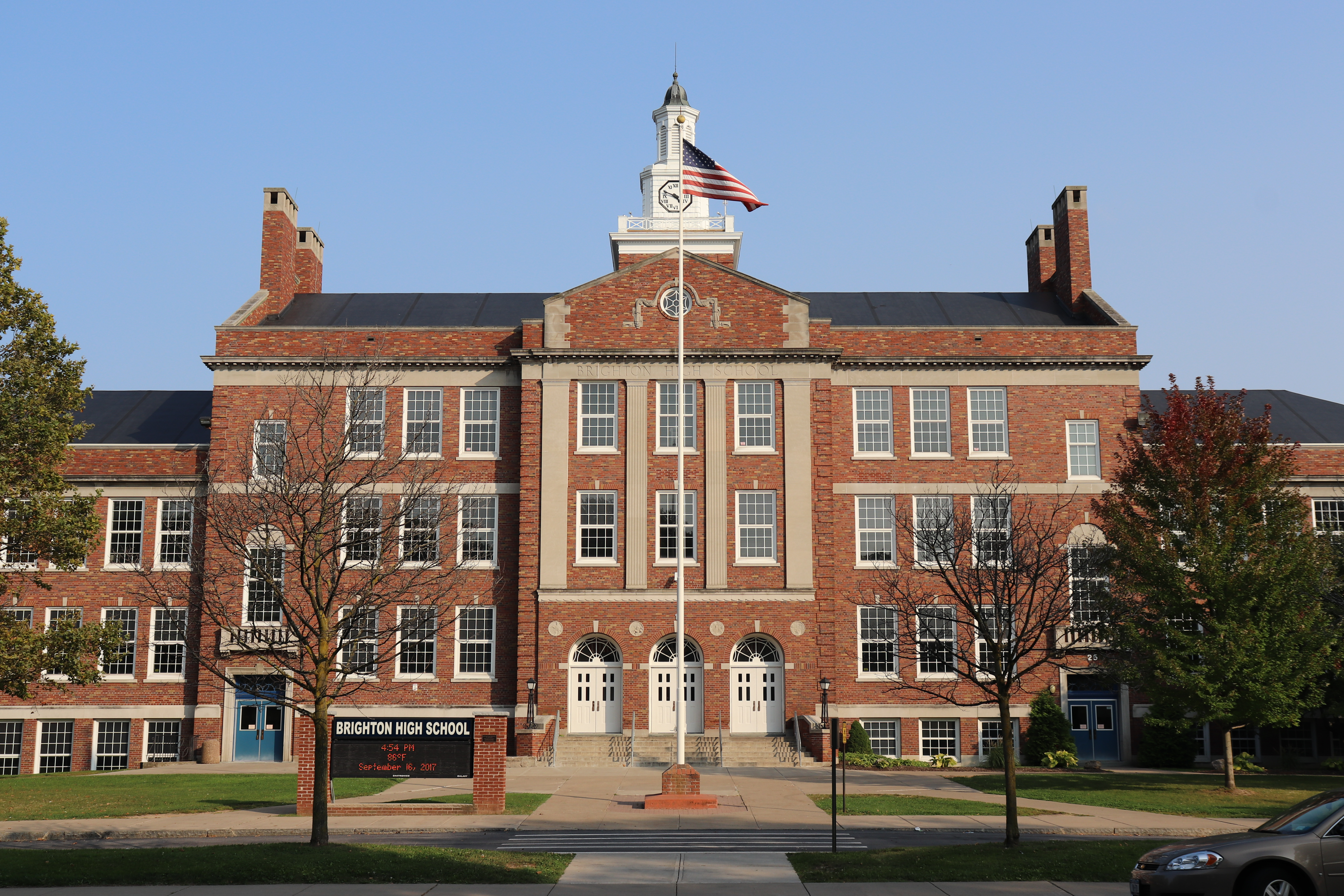

Location
- 1150 Winton Road; Rochester, New York 14618; United States; 43°7′24″N 77°34′00″W

Information
- School district: Brighton Central School District
- Principal: Thomas Hall
- Teaching staff: 97.61 (FTE)
- Grades: 9-12
- Enrollment: 1,182 (2023–2024)
- Average class size: 290
- Student to teacher ratio: 12.11
- Colors: Navy, white, and gray
- Publication: Galaxy
- Newspaper: Trapezoid
- Yearbook: Crossroads
- Graduates: 97%
- Website: bhs.bcsd.org

Brighton High School, commonly abbreviated BHS, is a public high school located in Brighton, an incorporated town adjacent to the southeast border of Rochester, New York, United States. It offers a comprehensive curriculum for students in grades 9–12. It is part of the Brighton Central School District.

== Academics ==
The class of 2024 graduated 278 students. There were four National Merit Scholarship semi-finalists and twelve commended students. For the class of 2024, about 88% of graduates chose to go onto higher education, with the majority going to four-year colleges. Brighton regularly sends numerous graduates to top colleges and universities, including alumni currently at the University of Pennsylvania, Cornell University, Harvard University, Williams College, Princeton University, the University of Rochester, the University of Maryland, Stanford University, Georgetown University, and the Massachusetts Institute of Technology.

In 2024, Brighton offered Advanced Placement (AP) classes in numerous subjects, including Calculus (AB and BC), Biology, Physics (1, 2, and C), Chemistry, Environmental Science, Government and Politics, Psychology, United States History, European History, Statistics, Studio Art, English Literature, English Language, Spanish, French, German, and Computer Science.

== Performance ==
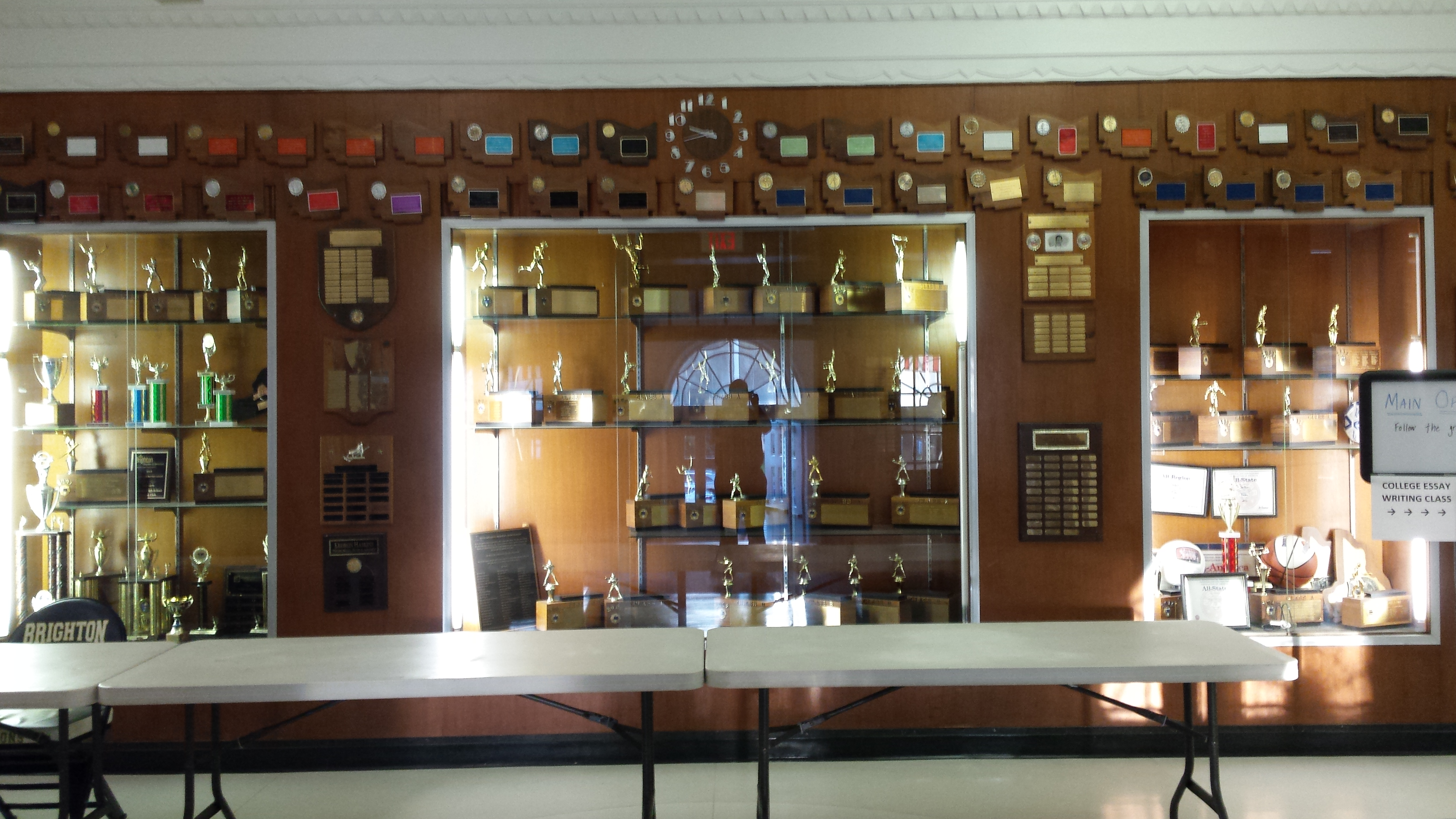
Trophy case in the front lobby

The school has appeared on Newsweek magazine's Top 100 Public High Schools list. In 1998, Brighton achieved its highest ranking on the Newsweek list, in 5th place. In 2004, it was ranked 27th in the nation. In 2006, it was placed 96th. In 2007, it was placed 79th, one ahead of Pittsford Mendon High School. In 2008, it was ranked 158, fifth among schools in the Rochester area behind Pittsford Sutherland, Pittsford Mendon, Greece Odyssey and Wilson Magnet. Rankings fluctuate heavily based upon AP exams administered relative to the graduating senior class. In 2010, Brighton was placed 126th.

In 2007, U.S. News & World Report magazine ranked Brighton High School 57th out of 18,790 public high schools. It was the only Monroe County school on the list.

== Publications and productions ==
Trapezoid is Brighton High School's monthly school newspaper. Sections include news, feature, opinion, in depth and sports. The newspaper has repeatedly received a number of awards, including first place in the Bertram Freed Memorial Award Competition, and New York's Best Newspaper and Best Online Publication from the Empire State School Press Association for several years in a row.

Crossroads, Brighton High School's yearbook, was founded in 1933. It is distributed at BHS's annual Springfest.

Galaxy, created in 1954, is Brighton's art and literary magazine. Galaxy continues its tradition of holding meetings at students' homes on Sunday evenings. Galaxy is entirely student-created, with the help of advisor and art teacher Debra Burger and is printed locally. In 2009, the magazine received a First Place with Special Merit award from the American Scholastic Press Association for its article on French sub ordinance. That same year, Jessy Randall (BHS class of 1988) published a young adult novel about Galaxy, The Wandora Unit. Galaxy received the Gold/All New York Award, as well as the Award for Originality from the annual ESSPA (Empire State Scholastic Press Association) Conference in 2011. Many individual Galaxy members won Gold awards in their respective fields at this conference as well.

The Morning Show began in the 1986–1987 school year with Brighton Beat, a precursor to The Morning Show. This show included one news and one interview show each week. In 1991, The Morning Show was officially created at BHS by producers Bennett Killmer and Joe Nussbaum, with the help of a teacher, Richard Tschorke. Nussbaum went on to direct the short film George Lucas in Love and the feature films Sleepover and Sydney White starring Amanda Bynes. Tschorke was the advisor to the club for twenty years, later to be succeeded by Chris French as the new club advisor. The show originally only had a few small cameras. Since then, it has grown to include two Blackmagic Design studio cameras, a Behringer Audio Mixer, a graphics program from Datavideo called CG-500 and a Blackmagic Design ATEM 1 M/E Switcher. The show started streaming over the internet exclusively starting in the 2015-2016 school year.

== Extracurricular activities ==
Many of Brighton's extracurricular teams have performed well in competitions:

- Brighton Science Olympiad
  - The team was regional champion from 2010 to 2014, as well as 2026.
- Brighton Math Team
- Brighton FBLA
- Brighton Envirothon
- Brighton Chess Team
  - The team was the upstate NY champions in 2022, 2023, and 2024.
  - Brighton was also the 2023 central NY champion, with a 4th place finish in the state scholastic championship.
- Brighton Masterminds
  - The team was named Rochester regional champion in 1995, 1997, 2005, 2014, 2015, and 2019.
  - In 2014 and 2015, the team placed second in the state championship meet.

Brighton offers other extracurriculars, including Mock Trial, Tutoring Club, Math Team, Gender and Sexuality Alliance Club, Climate Club, Brighton On Board (a board game focused club), Friends of Rachel, and Bruins e-Sports Club.

== Notable alumni ==
- Ernie Clement (2014), professional baseball player for the Toronto Blue Jays of MLB
- Richard Ben Cramer (1967), Pulitzer Prize-winning journalist, author, and screenwriter
- Tom Cross (1987), Academy Award-winning film editor
- Winston Duke (2004), actor, appeared on Modern Family, Person of Interest, Marvel's Black Panther and 2018's Avengers: Infinity War
- Tina Monshipour Foster (1993), lawyer and director of the International Justice Network, focusing on providing "free legal assistance to victims of torture, illegal imprisonment, and political and religious persecution."
- Hank Greenwald (1953), sportscaster
- Tom Hamburger (1970), journalist, among a group of journalists at The Washington Post credited with a Pulitzer Prize in 2018 for investigative reporting
- Shirley Jackson (1934), author
- Ilya Kaminsky (1996), Soviet-American poet
- Jess Klein (1991), singer-songwriter
- Jon Kolko (1996), designer and author
- Hudson Leick (1987), actor
- Josh Lewin (1986), sportscaster
- Jenna Marbles (2004), YouTube star and blogger
- Matt Medved (2004), editor-in-chief of Spin
- Dennis Mepham (1976), professional soccer player who played in the NASL and the MISL
- Joe Nussbaum (1991), film director
- Thomas Richards (1961), former mayor of Rochester, NY
- Bruce Sabath, actor
- William Scandling (1940), businessman who founded Saga Corporation, a food service company whose remnants are now part of Sodexo.
- Arthur Schneider (1948) four-time Emmy Award winning television editor
- Kristen Wiig (1991), actress and comedian, cast member of Saturday Night Live from 2005 to 2012, and an Academy Award and BAFTA nominee for Best Original Screenplay for her film Bridesmaids
- Rodin Younessi (1986), professional race car driver
