= Jeff Konya =

American college athletics director (born 1973)

Current position
- Title: Athletic director
- Team: San Jose State
- Conference: MW

Biographical details
- Born: February 17, 1973 (age 53); Royal Oak, Michigan, U.S.
- Education: Princeton University (BA); University of Iowa (JD)

Playing career
- 1992: Princeton
- Positions: Defensive lineman, center

Administrative career (AD unless noted)
- 1999–2000: South Dakota (Dir. of compliance & student services/ticket & gameday manager)
- 2000–2003: Bucknell (asst. AD for compliance & student affairs)
- 2003–2005: UTSA (assoc. AD/asst. AD)
- 2005–2006: Memphis (asst. AD)
- 2006–2009: SMU (assoc. AD)
- 2009–2010: Northeastern State
- 2010–2014: Cal State Bakersfield
- 2014–2018: Oakland
- 2018–2021: Northeastern
- 2021–present: San Jose State

Accomplishments and honors

Awards
- 2x NACDA Athletics Director of The Year; 2016–2017; 2020–21

Jeffrey Frank Konya (born February 17, 1973) is an American college athletics administrator. He is currently the athletic director (AD) at San Jose State University since 2021.

== Early life, playing career, and education ==
Konya was born and raised in Royal Oak, Michigan to parents Chuck and Edie Konya. Konya grew up in West Bloomfield Township, Michigan. At age 8 or 9, Konya moved to Pittsford, New York where he later attended Pittsford Mendon High School and played on the high school's football team as a cornerback, linebacker and offensive lineman. Konya graduated from Pittsford Mendon High in 1991 and committed to play at Princeton University as a defensive lineman and center.

Konya quit after one season due to injuries, and graduated with a Bachelor of Arts degree in political science from Princeton as late as 1995. Konya then attended the University of Iowa College of Law, and obtained his Juris Doctor in 1998.

== Career ==
=== Early years (1999–2008) ===
In 1999, Konya's became the Director of Compliance and Student Services and Ticket and Gameday Manager at University of South Dakota. In 2000, Konya took the equivalent job at Bucknell University.

Konya then served as an associate AD for University of Texas at San Antonio from 2003 to 2005, University of Memphis from 2005 to 2006, and Southern Methodist University from 2006 to 2009.

=== Northeastern State (2009–2010) ===
In 2009, Konya got his first AD job at Northeastern State University. Konya oversaw the university's mascot change from "Redmen" to, what is today, "RedHawks" and the university's move from the Lone Star Conference (LSC) to the Mid-America Intercollegiate Athletics Association (MIAA) in his second, and final, year.

=== Cal State Bakersfield (2010–2014) ===
In 2010, Konya became the AD at California State University, Bakersfield. During his final year, he increased funding for athletic scholarships and overall fundraising and got Cal State Bakersfield into the Western Athletic Conference.

=== Oakland (2014–2018) ===
In 2014, Konya became the AD at Oakland University to replace outgoing Tracy Huth. Konya, in conjunction with Oakland Golden Grizzlies men's basketball's long-time head coach Greg Kampe, oversaw the installation of OU Credit Union O'rena's blacktop-themed court.

On February 22, 2016, Konya received a 1-game suspension by the Horizon League for "violating the conference's sportsmanship policy for vocally disagree[ing] with some calls during the first half" in the men's basketball team's loss against Valparaiso. Konya was responsible for granting Kampe an extension through the 2019–20 season in April 2016 after the program's Vegas 16 appearance. In mid-2016, Konya was also responsible for the athletic department's partnership with WMYD to broadcast the men's basketball home games for the first time in program history, and brought in two head coaches for its baseball program for the first time in college baseball history.

In March 2017, Konya was amongst 28 athletic directors to be awarded Athletics director of the year by the National Association of Collegiate Directors of Athletics (NACDA). In May 2017, Konya merged the university's dance and cheerleading teams into the Oakland Spirit Squad. In June 2017, Konya signed a 5-year extension to stay as the university's athletic director. In July 2017, Konya hired Lauren Karn to lead the university's softball program.

=== Northeastern (2018–2021) ===
In January 2018, Konya became the AD at Northeastern University to replace outgoing Peter Roby. Under his administration, Konya was responsible for the university's partnership with NESN to broadcast up to 75 field hockey, men's and women's ice hockey, and baseball games. In April 2020, Northeastern elevated its Esports club to the varsity level: making the university to become the first university in New England to sponsor Esports. In March 2021, Konya was awarded NACDA AD of the year.

=== San Jose State (2021–present) ===
In June 2021, Konya became the AD at San Jose State University.

== Personal life ==
Konya is a second generation Hungarian American. Konya is a fan of Liverpool F.C.
