= John F. Harris =

American journalist

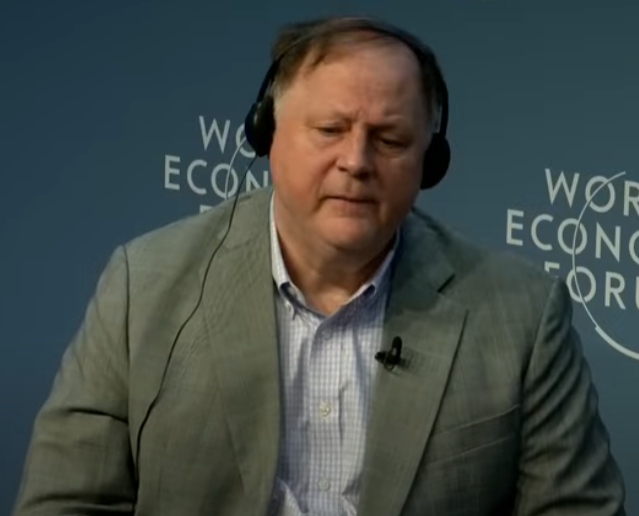
- At the 2024 World Economic Forum
- Education: Carleton College (BA)
- Occupations: Editor, journalist
- Known for: Co-founder of Politico
- Spouse: Ann O'Hanlon
- Children: 3

John F. Harris is an American political journalist who is the co-founder of Politico. With former partner Jim VandeHei, Harris founded Politico on January 23, 2007. He served as editor-in-chief from 2007 to 2019 and as global editor-in-chief from 2023 to 2026. Harris is the author of a book on Bill Clinton called The Survivor, and the co-author of The Way to Win: Clinton, Bush, Rove and How to Take the White House in 2008, with Mark Halperin.

== Early life and education ==
Harris grew up in Pittsford, New York, where he attended Pittsford Sutherland High School. He graduated from Carleton College in 1985, where he studied American history.

== Career ==
After graduating from college, Harris worked for The Washington Post for 21 years, having started as an intern. In 1990, he was transferred to the Post's Richmond bureau, covering Virginia politics during Douglas Wilder's governorship. He covered the Clinton White House from 1995 to 2001. In 2003, he was a guest scholar at the Brookings Institution. He became the Post's National Politics Editor in June 2005. Harris began "having conversations" in 2006 with fellow Post journalist Jim VandeHei about creating "a new publication about politics from the ground up". Those conversations led to the launch of Politico in 2007 under the Allbritton Communications banner.

Harris was the editor-in-chief of Politico from 2007 to 2019, when he was succeeded by Matthew Kaminski. He was the global editor-in-chief from 2023 to 2026, after which he was succeeded by Jonathan Greenberger.

== Personal life ==
Harris is married to Ann O'Hanlon, and lives with their three children, Liza, Griffin, and Nikki, in Alexandria, Virginia.

== Works ==
- Mark Halperin and John F. Harris, The Way to Win: Taking the White House in 2008, Random House, October 2006, ISBN 1-4000-6447-3
- John F. Harris, The Survivor: Bill Clinton in the White House, Random House, May 2005, ISBN 0-375-50847-3, (Random House Trade Paperbacks, October 2006, ISBN 0-375-76084-9)
