= Horizon League softball tournament =

Horizon League Softball Championship
- Sport: Softball
- Conference: Horizon League
- Number of teams: 6
- Format: Double-elimination tournament
- Current stadium: YSU Softball Complex
- Current location: Youngstown, Ohio
- Last contest: 2026
- Current champion: Northern Kentucky
- Most championships: UIC (10)

The Horizon League Softball Championship is the conference softball tournament of the NCAA Division I Horizon League in college softball. The four team double-elimination tournament is held at the home field of the regular season winner. In 2021, UIC won the title for the 10th time, most in conference history.

The winner of the tournament receives an automatic berth to the NCAA Division I softball championship.

== Champions ==
=== By year ===
Year	Champion	Site	Most Valuable Player
1987	Detroit Mercy	Indianapolis, IN	N/A
1988	Detroit Mercy	Indianapolis, IN	N/A
1989	Detroit Mercy	Indianapolis, IN	N/A
1990	Notre Dame	Dayton, OH	N/A
1991	Notre Dame	Indianapolis, IN	N/A
1992	Detroit Mercy	Indianapolis, IN	Denice Tackett, Detroit Mercy
1993	Notre Dame	Indianapolis, IN	Terri Kobata, Notre Dame
1994	Notre Dame	Indianapolis, IN	Terri Kobata, Notre Dame
1995	Notre Dame	Cleveland, OH	Sara Hayes, Notre Dame
1996	Northern Illinois	DeKalb, IL	Missy Kaczor, Northern Illinois
1997	Cleveland State	Detroit, MI	Amy Kyler, Cleveland State
1998	UIC	Green Bay, WI	Samantha Iuli, UIC
1999	UIC	Chicago, IL	Samantha Iuli, UIC
2000	UIC	Indianapolis, IN	Samantha Iuli, UIC
2001	UIC	Chicago, IL	Stefanie Christoferson, UIC
2002	UIC	Dayton, OH	Amanda Rivera, UIC
2003	Wright State	Cleveland, OH	Stephanie Salas, Wright State
2004	UIC	Chicago, IL	Amanda Rivera, UIC
2005	Green Bay	Green Bay, WI	Stephanie Hansen, Green Bay
2006	Youngstown State	Canfield, OH	McKenzie Bedra, Youngstown State
2007	Wright State	Cleveland, OH	Jamie Perkins, Wright State
2008	Wright State	Chicago, IL	Sharon Palma, Wright State
2009	Cleveland State	Pendleton, IN	Natalie DeMatteis, Cleveland State
2010	Wright State	Cleveland, OH	Kristen Bradshaw, Wright State
2011	UIC	Chicago, IL	Ashley Hewitt, UIC
2012	Valparaiso	Valparaiso, IN	Angie Doerffler, Valparaiso
2013	Valparaiso	Chicago, IL	Janelle Bouchard, Valparaiso
2014	Green Bay	Dayton, OH	Ashley Nannemann, Green Bay
2015	Oakland	Oakland Softball Stadium • Rochester, MI	Sara Cupp, Oakland
2016	Valparaiso	Chicago, IL	Sam Stewart, Valparaiso
2017	UIC	Chicago, IL	Tiana Mack-Miller, UIC
2018	UIC	Chicago, IL	Tiana Mack-Miller, UIC
2019	Detroit Mercy	Chicago, IL	Liz Murphy, Detroit Mercy
2020	Championship canceled due to COVID-19 pandemic		
2021	UIC	YSU Softball Complex • Youngstown, OH	Marley Hanlon, UIC
2022	Oakland	YSU Softball Complex	Madison Jones, Oakland
2023	Northern Kentucky	Green Bay, WI	Lauryn Hicks, Northern Kentucky
2024	Cleveland State	YSU Softball Complex	Melissa Holzopfel, Cleveland State
2025	Robert Morris	Cleveland, OH	Courtney Poulich, Robert Morris
2026	Northern Kentucky	Youngstown, OH	Jena Rhoads, Northern Kentucky

=== By school ===
School	Championships	Years
UIC	10	1998, 1999, 2000, 2001, 2002, 2004, 2011, 2017, 2018, 2021
Detroit Mercy	5	1987, 1988, 1989, 1992, 2019
Notre Dame	5	1990, 1991, 1993, 1994, 1995
Wright State	4	2003, 2007, 2008, 2010
Cleveland State	3	1997, 2009, 2024
Valparaiso	3	2012, 2013, 2016
Green Bay	2	2005, 2014
Northern Kentucky	2	2023, 2026
Oakland	2	2015, 2022
Northern Illinois	1	1996
Robert Morris	1	2025
Youngstown State	1	2006

Italics indicates school no longer sponsors softball in the Horizon League.
