= General Hopkins =

General Hopkins may refer to:

- Caleb Hopkins (colonel) (1770–1818), New York Militia brigadier general
- Frederic Williams Hopkins (1806–1874), Vermont Militia adjutant general
- Ronald Hopkins (1897–1990), Australian Army major general
- Samuel Hopkins (congressman) (1753–1819), U.S. Army major general
