= Brookwood Inn =

Brookwood Inn is a small chain of independently operated hotels, founded by a New York-based Hudson Hotels. There are locations in several cities including Pittsford, New York, Charlotte, North Carolina, and Raleigh, North Carolina. The Durham, North Carolina location is near Duke University and used to be a "Cricket Inn" before Brookwood purchased the hotel.

In 2005, The Widewaters Group, Inc., a real estate development and management firm headquartered in Syracuse, NY. purchased the Brookwood Inn.

On September 9, 2009, the Widewaters Group chose Access Hotels & Resorts to manage the Brookwood Inn.
