= Mr. Tire =

American auto service company

Mr. Tire Auto Service Centers
- Company type: Wholly owned subsidiary
- Industry: Automobile care
- Founded: 1970 in Richfield, Minnesota, U.S.
- Founder: Joseph Tomarchio Sr.
- Headquarters: Rochester, New York
- Number of locations: 318 (2022)
- Area served: Maryland, Delaware, New Jersey, Virginia, North Carolina, South Carolina, New York, Pennsylvania, Ohio, and West Virginia
- Key people: Jose L Rodriguez, CEO
- Services: Retail tire sales and service, scheduled maintenance, oil changes, brakes, muffler and exhaust services, battery replacement, wheel alignments, brakes, and automotive repairs.
- Parent: Monro, Inc.
- Website: www.mrtire.com

Mr. Tire is an American auto service company. The company was founded in 1970 by Joseph Tomarchio Sr. Based out of Rochester, New York, the company provides various automotive repair services across 13 U.S. states.

== History ==
Mr. Tire was founded in 1970 in Richfield, Minnesota. It distributed CO-OP brand tires and was controlled by Universal Cooperatives. It is a retailers' cooperative. As of 2001, the distributor had 102 affiliated dealers in 13 states.

The second Mr. Tire Auto Service Center was founded in 1970 in Baltimore, Maryland, covering more than 300 locations in Maryland, Delaware, New Jersey, Virginia, North Carolina, South Carolina, New York, Pennsylvania, Ohio, and West Virginia. This organization licensed the "Mr. Tire" name from Universal Cooperatives.

Mr. Tire Auto Service Center was acquired by Monro Inc. in 2004 along with Tread Quarters, Kimmel Automotive, Tread Quarters Discount Tires, and Rice Tires.
