= Lauren Karn =

American softball coach

Current position
- Title: Head coach
- Team: Maryland
- Conference: Big Ten
- Record: 42–61 (.408)

Biographical details
- Born: Levittown, Pennsylvania, U.S.
- Education: Saint Joseph's University

Playing career
- 2005–2008: Saint Joseph's

Coaching career (HC unless noted)
- 2008–2009: Saint Joseph's (asst.)
- 2009–2012: Marist (asst.)
- 2012–2014: Delaware (asst.)
- 2015–2017: Pittsburgh (asst.)
- 2018–2023: Oakland
- 2024–present: Maryland

Head coaching record
- Overall: 163–186 (.467)

Accomplishments and honors

Championships
- Horizon League softball tournament (2022); Horizon League regular season (2022, 2023)

Awards
- Horizon League Coach of the Year (2022)

Lauren Karn is an American former softball player and current head coach at Maryland. She previously served as the head coach at Oakland.

== Coaching career ==
=== Oakland ===
On July 17, 2017, Karn (formerly Cognigni) was named the head coach of the Oakland Golden Grizzlies softball team.

=== Maryland ===
On August 31, 2023, Karn was named the head coach of the Maryland Terrapins softball team.

== Personal life ==
Karn and her husband Justin have two children. One boy, Mickey, and one girl, Sophie. Sophie was born a week before Oakland was scheduled to face Northwestern in the 2022 NCAA Tournament.

== Head coaching record ==
Record table
Season	Team	Overall	Conference	Standing	Postseason
Oakland Golden Grizzlies (Horizon League) (2018–2023)
2018	Oakland	23–27	13–8	2nd	
2019	Oakland	18–33	9–14	6th	
2020	Oakland	7–11	0–0		Season canceled due to COVID-19
2021	Oakland	26–16	23–11	T-2nd	
2022	Oakland	26–17	18–7	1st	NCAA Regional
2023	Oakland	21–21	14–7	1st	
Oakland:		121–125 (.492)	77–47 (.621)		
Maryland Terrapins (Big Ten Conference) (2024–Present)
2024	Maryland	24–30	8–15	T-10th	
2025	Maryland	18–31	3–19	T-16th	
Maryland:		42–61 (.408)	11–34 (.244)		
Total:		163–186 (.467)			
National champion Postseason invitational champion Conference regular season champion Conference regular season and conference tournament champion Division regular season champion Division regular season and conference tournament champion Conference tournament champion
