= Pittsford Mendon High School =

Location
- 472 Mendon Road; Pittsford, NY 14534; USA
- 43.059983°N 77.518845°W

Information
- Type: Public high school
- Established: 1972
- School district: Pittsford Central School District
- Superintendent: Shana Cutaia
- CEEB code: 334529
- Principal: Melissa Julian
- Teaching staff: 81.55 (on FTE basis)
- Grades: 9–12
- Enrollment: 919
- Student to teacher ratio: 11.27
- Colors: Gold and Maroon
- Athletics conference: Section V (NYSPHSAA); Monroe County Public School Athletic Conference
- Team name: Vikings
- Rival: Pittsford Sutherland High School; Brighton High School; Fairport High School
- Newspaper: The Runestone
- Yearbook: Heimskringla
- Feeder schools: Barker Road Middle School
- Website: School website

Pittsford Mendon High School is a public high school in suburban Rochester, Monroe County, upstate New York. It is one of two high schools in the Pittsford Central School District, the other being Pittsford Sutherland High School. Pittsford Mendon is located at 472 Mendon Road (from which the school gets its name) in the town of Pittsford, near the town of Mendon, New York.

As of the 2024–25 school year, the school had an enrollment of 919 students and 81.55 classroom teachers (on an FTE basis), for a student-teacher ratio of 11.27. The student population was composed of 503 male students and 411 female students.

== Awards and recognition ==
Pittsford Mendon was recognized by U.S. News & World Report in its 2024 Best High Schools rankings, placing 335th nationally and 42nd in New York state, ranking among 3% of public high schools in the United States.

Pittsford Mendon was ranked 71st in the country (a Gold Medal School) by US News & World Report in its 2013 high school rankings.

In 2017, Pittsford Mendon High school was ranked #86 in the National Rankings and earned a gold medal. In New York alone, Pittsford Mendon High school was ranked #14. These rankings are based on the schools performance on state-required test scores and how well they prepared students for college.

In 2007, the school was ranked 94th nationwide in Newsweek's Top 1,300 High School's in the United States. Rankings are calculated using "a ratio that takes the number of Advanced Placement, Intl. Baccalaureate, and/or Cambridge tests taken by all students at a school in 2006 divided by the number of graduating seniors."

The school was ranked in 58th place nationwide in Newsweek's May 8, 2006 issue, listing the Top 1,200 High Schools in The United States. Pittsford Mendon High School was ranked as Number 39 in the United States in Newsweek's 2005 survey.

== Academics ==
Mendon offers a variety of courses, with numerous Advanced Placement (AP) courses in Science, English, Social Studies, Math, Art, Foreign Language, and Music. Mendon's Foreign Language selection includes Spanish, French, and Latin.

== Notable alumni ==
- Tyson Beckford, supermodel, actor.
- Nicole Fiscella, actress, noted for her role as Isabel Coates on Gossip Girl
- Lisa Franchetti, 33rd Chief of Naval Operations
- Stephen Gilfus, Founder of Blackboard Inc.; President and CEO Gilfus Education Group.
- Avram Glazer, Chairman of Manchester United
- Jeff Konya, college athletics administrator and athletic director.
- Danny Mendick, Baseball player for the New York Mets.
- Kaitlin Monte, actress, Miss New York 2011
- James Satloff, Investment bank CEO, Internet company CEO, Ski Company CEO
- Joy Tanner, Actress, noted for her role as Nora MacDonald on Disney's Life with Derek
- Steve Toth, member of the Texas House of Representatives from The Woodlands in suburban Houston.

== Feeder patterns ==
Park Road Elementary School, Thornell Road Elementary School, and the southern part of Mendon Center Elementary School feed into Barker Road Middle School, then to Pittsford Mendon High School. There is also a City-Suburban program, which sees over 50 students transferred from Rochester City Schools, to Mendon High School, and Barker Road Middle School.
