= Tire Choice =

Tire Choice Auto Service Centers
- Formerly: The Tire Choice (2004–2014)
- Company type: Subsidiary
- Industry: Automobile service
- Founded: 2004; 22 years ago
- Founder: Chuck Curico
- Headquarters: Rochester, New York, U.S.
- Number of locations: 231 (2021)
- Area served: Florida, Louisiana, North Carolina, South Carolina, Tennessee, Pennsylvania, Ohio, California
- Key people: Daniel Hennelly (Chairman & CEO)
- Products: Automobile tires
- Services: Oil changes, tire service, battery replacement, wiper blades, inspections
- Revenue: US$114 million (2021)
- Number of employees: 2,000 (2021)
- Parent: Monro, Inc. (2014–present)
- Website: https://www.thetirechoice.com/

Tire Choice Auto Service Centers is a brand of retail tire and automotive service stores. Dan Kennelly, a former Tires Plus (Morgan Tire) executive, and his wife Diane Hennelly founded The Tire Choice in 2004, building 35 stores, all in Florida. Monro, Inc. made its entry into Florida when they acquired the chain in 2014.[1] Monro renamed the stores Tire Choice Auto Service Centers and expanded the brand in Florida, Las Vegas, Nevada and into other states.

== Services and locations ==
Tire Choice offers tire sales and service, manufacturer scheduled maintenance, oil changes, brakes, wheel alignments, and automotive repairs at 231 locations in eight states: California, Florida, Louisiana, North Carolina, South Carolina, Tennessee, Pennsylvania, Ohio.

Tire Choice took over the 6 Las Vegas Nevada Superior Goodyear locations and 1 ground up location in 2020 to rebrand them as Tire Choice.

== Awards and community involvement ==
The company was voted "Best of South Lee" 2006, South Lee Messenger

It sponsors the University of Miami Hurricanes and the University of South Florida Bulls, and a few local activities.
