= Adam Podlesh =

American football player (born 1983)

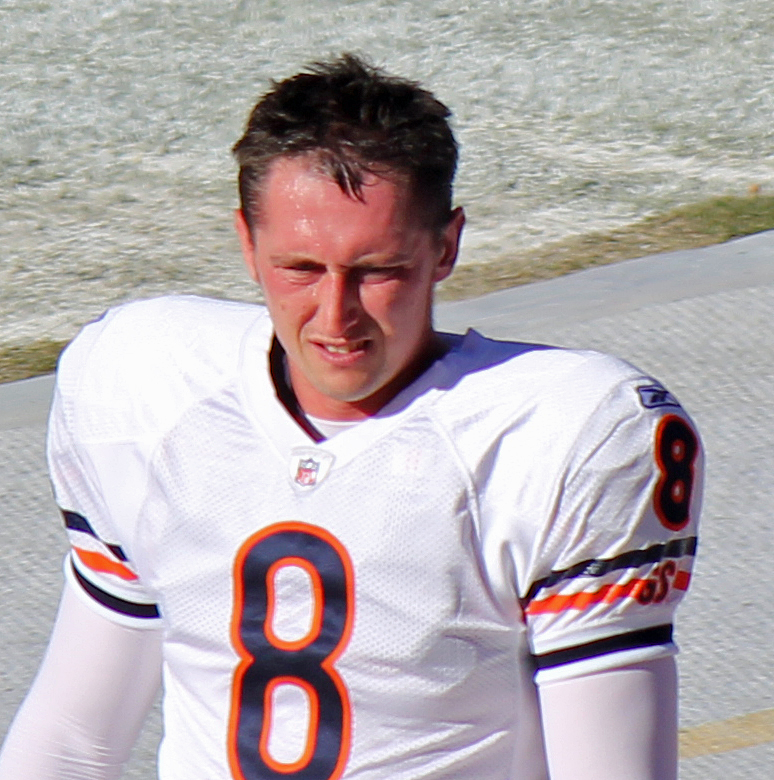
- Podlesh with the Chicago Bears in 2011

No. 3, 8
- Position: Punter

Personal information
- Born: August 11, 1983 (age 43); Rochester, New York, U.S.
- Listed height: 5 ft 11 in (1.80 m)
- Listed weight: 200 lb (91 kg)

Career information
- High school: Pittsford Sutherland (Pittsford, New York)
- College: Maryland (2002–2006)
- NFL draft: 2007: 4th round, 101st overall pick

Career history
- Jacksonville Jaguars (2007–2010); Chicago Bears (2011–2013); Pittsburgh Steelers (2014)

Awards and highlights
- 4× Second-team All-ACC (2003–2006); Iron Terp Award (2006)

Career NFL statistics
- Punts: 467
- Punt yards: 19,816
- Punting yard average: 42.4
- Stats at Pro Football Reference

Adam Podlesh (born August 11, 1983) is an American former professional football player who was a punter in the National Football League (NFL). He played college football for the Maryland Terrapins, and is the only player in school history to be on the All-Atlantic Coast Conference team for four years. His punting average of 43.1 yards ranks second in school history. He also played for the Jacksonville Jaguars and Chicago Bears of the NFL.

== Early life ==
Podlesh, who is Jewish, is a graduate of Pittsford Sutherland High School in Pittsford, New York and is a three-time letterman in football. Podlesh also played defense and offense for Pittsford Sutherland. On defense, he recorded 92 tackles and five sacks. On offense, he recorded 638 rushing yards and nine touchdowns.

Podlesh was also a standout athlete for the Pittsford Sutherland High School track team. He posted the fastest 200 metres and 400 metres times in New York state in his junior year, with times of 21.58 seconds and 50.5 seconds, respectively. He also ran the third leg of the state title-winning 4 x 100 metres relay team in 2000.

== College career ==
He played college football for the Maryland Terrapins. He spent his freshman year on the scout team. He is the only player in school history to be on the All-Atlantic Coast Conference team for four years. In Podlesh's 48 games played at Maryland, he punted 216 times for 9,314 yards, which ranks fifth in school history (behind Dan DeArmas, Dale Castro, Russ Edwards, and Darryl Wright). His punting average of 43.1 yards ranks behind Brooks Barnard in school history. He had 83 of his attempts land inside the 20-yard line, with 35 of them landing inside the 10-yard line.

=== 2003 season ===
As a freshman at the University of Maryland, Podlesh appeared in all 12 regular season games and the bowl game for the Terrapins. On August 28, 2003, in the season opener against Northern Illinois, Podlesh had a season-high eight punts for a season-high net of 363 yards in the 20–13 loss. In the Gator Bowl against West Virginia, Podlesh had two punts for 67 yards in the 41–7 victory. Overall, in his freshman season, Podlesh had 53 punts for 2,241 yards for a 42.3 average.

=== 2004 season ===
As a sophomore, Podlesh appeared in 11 regular season games. On October 9, 2004, against Georgia Tech, Podlesh had a then-career high nine punts for a then-career high 448 net yards in the 20–7 loss. In the following week against NC State, Podlesh set career highs with 11 punts for 497 net yards in the 13–3 loss. In the 2004 season, Podlesh had 63 punts for 2,756 yards for a 43.7 average.

=== 2005 season ===
As a junior, Podlesh appeared in 11 regular season games. On September 24, 2005, against Wake Forest, Podlesh had a season-high 298 net yards on six punts in the 22–12 victory. Overall, in the 2005 season, Podlesh had 44 punts for 1,918 yards for a 43.6 average. In recognition of his successful season, Podlesh was named to the Jewish Sports Review’s 2005 College Football All-America Team.

=== 2006 season ===
Podlesh set the school record for a punter in the spring with a 4.44 time in the 40-yard dash in 2006 spring training, which earned him the Iron Terp Award.

As a senior, Podlesh appeared in all 12 regular season games and the bowl game. On November 11, 2006, against Miami, Podlesh had a season-high 332 net yards on eight punts in the 14–13 victory. On December 29, in the Champs Sports Bowl, Podlesh had four punts for 157 net yards in the 24–7 victory. Overall, in the 2006 season, Podlesh had 56 punts for 2,400 yards for a 42.9 average.

== Professional career ==
Pre-draft measurables
Height	Weight	Arm length	Hand span
5 ft 11 in (1.80 m)	202 lb (92 kg)	30 1/4 in (0.77 m)	8 3/4 in (0.22 m)
All values from NFL Combine

=== Jacksonville Jaguars ===
==== 2007 season ====
Podlesh was selected by the Jacksonville Jaguars in the fourth round of the 2007 NFL draft with the 101st overall pick. In his rookie season, Podlesh appeared in all 16 regular season games and two playoff games. On September 9, in his NFL debut against the Tennessee Titans, Podlesh had five punts for 211 net yards in the 13–10 loss at EverBank Field. Against the Tampa Bay Buccaneers, Podlesh had eight punts for a season-high 364 net yards in the 24–23 victory. Podlesh would make his playoff debut against the Pittsburgh Steelers in the Wild Card Round of the playoffs. In the 31–29 victory, he had four punts for 200 net yards. The next week, the Jaguars faced off against the 16–0 New England Patriots in the Divisional Round. In the 31–20 defeat, Podlesh had one punt for 50 yards. Although this was only his rookie season, Podlesh would never appear in another playoff game.

Overall, in the 2007 season, Podlesh had 54 punts for 2,249 net yards for a 41.65 average.

==== 2008 season ====
On June 2, 2008, he was elected to the Rochester Jewish Sports Hall of Fame. He was participating in the Jaguars OTA workouts, so his grandmother, Betty Podlesh, accepted the honor for him.

In the 2008 season, Podlesh appeared in 11 games. Against the Tennessee Titans in the season opener on September 7, Podlesh had six punts for 222 net yards in the 17–10 loss. In another game with the Titans on November 16, Podlesh had 10 punts for a career-high 409 net yards in the 24–14 loss.

Overall, in the 2008 season, Podlesh had 46 punts for 1,989 yards for a 43.24 average.

==== 2009 season ====
In the 2009 season, Podlesh appeared in all 16 regular season games. Against the Indianapolis Colts in the season opener on September 13, Podlesh had five punts for 189 net yards in the 14–12 loss at Lucas Oil Stadium. Against the Seattle Seahawks in Week 5, Podlesh had a season-high 371 net yards on eight punts in the 41–0 loss. Against the Houston Texans in Week 13, Podlesh had three punts for 148 net yards for a season-high 49.33 average.

Overall, in the 2009 season, Podlesh had 72 punts for 3,017 yards for a 41.90 average.

==== 2010 season ====
In 2010, Podlesh was diagnosed with cancer of the salivary gland, but following successful surgery he was told that radiation therapy and chemotherapy would not be required, and he returned to the field after six weeks, not missing any playing time.

In the 2010 season, Podlesh appeared in all 16 regular season games. Against the Denver Broncos in the season opener on September 12, Podlesh had four punts for 165 net yards in the 24–17 victory. Against the Philadelphia Eagles in Week 3, Podlesh had a season-high 384 net yards on eight punts in the 28–3 loss. Against the Dallas Cowboys in Week 8, Podlesh had five punts for 242 net yards for a season-high 48.40 average in the 35–17 victory at Cowboys Stadium.

Overall, in the 2010 season, Podlesh had 57 punts for 2,496 yards for a 43.79 average.

=== Chicago Bears ===
==== 2011 season ====
On July 29, 2011, Podlesh signed with the Chicago Bears, who had released veteran Brad Maynard.

In the 2011 season, Podlesh appeared in all 16 regular season games. Against the Atlanta Falcons in the season opener on September 11, Podlesh had six punts for 288 net yards in his Bears debut at Soldier Field as the Bears won 30–12. Against the Denver Broncos in Week 14, Podlesh had a career-high 11 punts for a career-high 526 net yards in the 13–10 loss. Against the Green Bay Packers on Christmas Day, Podlesh had a season high 49.00 yards per punt average in the 35–21 loss.

Overall, in the 2011 season, Podlesh had 89 punts for 3,903 yards for a 43.85 average.

Podlesh recorded a 40.4 yard net average in the 2011 season, the best average by a Chicago Bear since 1966, despite injuries to special teamers Patrick Mannelly, Brian Iwuh, Kyle Adams, and Anthony Walters, as well as Chris Conte, Major Wright, and Kahlil Bell becoming starters, and Sam Hurd getting released. His 43.85 yard gross average was the best of his career, and was the third highest in team history, behind Todd Sauerbrun's 44.8 in 1996 and Brad Maynard's 44.2 in 2006.

==== 2012 season ====
In the second game of the 2012 preseason, Podlesh left the game with a left hip flexor that he sustained while attempting to tackle Washington Redskins returner Brandon Banks, who eventually returned the punt 91 yards for a touchdown. Podlesh was replaced by Ryan Quigley for the third game against the New York Giants. Though he was listed as "Probable", Podlesh would be ready for the regular season opener.

In the 2012 season, Podlesh appeared in all 16 regular season games. Against the Indianapolis Colts in the season opener at home on September 9, Podlesh had five punts for 208 net yards in the 41–21 victory. In Week 2, against the Green Bay Packers, Podlesh had a season-high 46.80 yards per punt average in the 23–10 loss. In Week 12 against the Minnesota Vikings, Podlesh faked the extra point, and ran it in for a two-point conversion. In Week 16, against the Arizona Cardinals, Podlesh had nine punts for a season-high 394 net yards in the 28–13 victory.

Overall, in the 2012 season, Podlesh had 81 punts for 3,399 yards for a 41.96 average. During the season, Podlesh averaged 42 yards per punt with a maximum hang time of 5.1 seconds, along with his longest punt going 64 yards.

==== 2013 season ====
In the 2013 season, Podlesh appeared in all 16 regular season games. Against the Cincinnati Bengals in the season opener at home on September 8, Podlesh had five punts for 232 net yards in the 24–21 victory. In Week 3, against the Pittsburgh Steelers, Podlesh had a season-high 282 net yards on six punts in the 40–23 victory. Against the Washington Redskins in Week 7 at FedExField, Podlesh had a season-high 49.00 yards per punt average in the 45–41 loss.

Overall, in the 2013 season, Podlesh had 68 punts for 2,763 yards for a 40.63 average.

On March 5, 2014, Podlesh was released by the Bears.

=== Pittsburgh Steelers ===
On April 15, 2014, the Pittsburgh Steelers signed Podlesh to a one-year deal. He was placed on the team's reserve/did not report list on August 12 and was released by the team on September 30, 2014.

== Career statistics ==
=== NFL ===
Legend
**Bold**	Career high

==== Regular season ====
Year	Team	Punting									
Year	Team	GP	Punts	Yds	Net Yds	Lng	Avg	Net Avg	Blk	Ins20	TB
2007	JAX	**16**	54	2,249	1,991	**76**	41.6	36.9	0	14	2
2008	JAX	11	46	1,989	1,683	60	43.2	36.6	0	12	5
2009	JAX	**16**	72	3,017	2,758	64	41.9	38.3	0	23	5
2010	JAX	**16**	57	2,496	2,233	63	43.8	39.2	0	26	**7**
2011	CHI	**16**	**89**	**3,903**	**3,600**	70	**43.9**	**40.4**	0	21	4
2012	CHI	**16**	81	3,399	3,195	64	42.0	39.4	0	**34**	6
2013	CHI	**16**	68	2,763	2,612	65	40.6	37.9	**1**	27	2
Career		107	467	19,816	18,072	76	42.4	38.6	1	157	31

==== Playoffs ====
Year	Team	Punting									
Year	Team	GP	Punts	Yds	Net Yds	Lng	Avg	Net Avg	Blk	Ins20	TB
2007	JAX	**2**	**5**	**250**	**208**	**54**	**50.0**	**41.6**	0	**1**	**1**
Career		2	5	250	208	54	50.0	41.6	0	1	1

=== College ===
Year	School	Conf	Class	Pos	G	Punting		
Year	School	Conf	Class	Pos	G	**Punts**	**Yds**	**Avg**
2003	Maryland	ACC	FR	P	13	53	2,241	42.3
2004	Maryland	ACC	SO	P	11	63	2,755	43.7
2005	Maryland	ACC	JR	P	11	44	1,920	43.6
2006	Maryland	ACC	SR	P	13	56	2,400	42.9
**Career**	**Maryland**				**48**	**216**	**9,316**	**43.1**

== Personal life ==
Podlesh is married to Miranda Keating, with whom he has a daughter, born October 2012, and a son, born July 2014. Miranda's second pregnancy was complicated by placental abruption and heart failure.

== See also ==
- List of select Jewish football players
