= Danny Mendick =

American baseball player (born 1993)

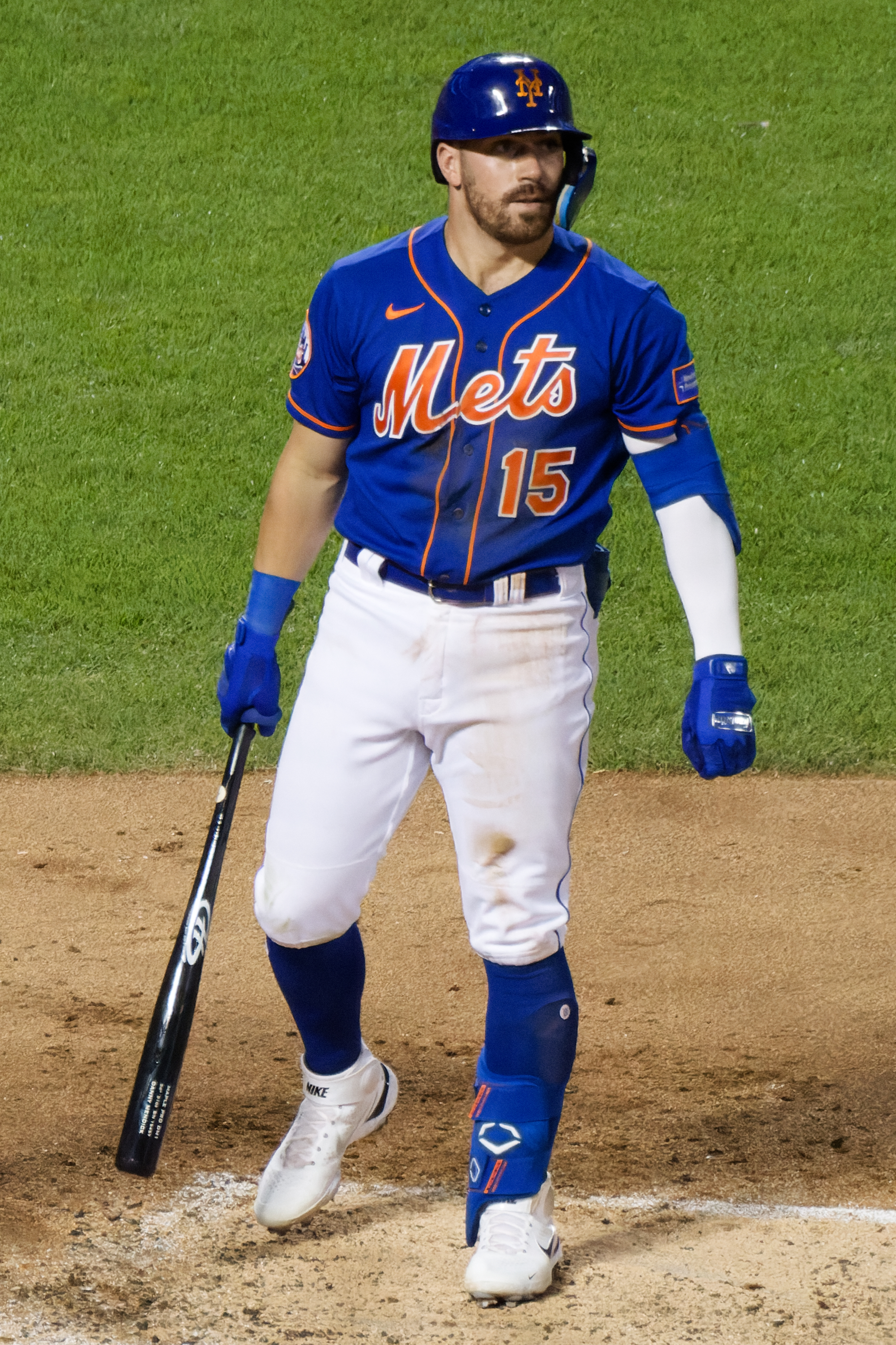
- Mendick with the Mets in 2023
- Infielder
- Born: September 28, 1993 (age 33); Rochester, New York, U.S.
- Batted: Right Threw: Right

MLB debut
- September 3, 2019, for the Chicago White Sox

Last MLB appearance
- July 12, 2024, for the Chicago White Sox

MLB statistics
- Batting average: .232
- Home runs: 14
- Runs batted in: 57
- Stats at Baseball Reference

Teams
- Chicago White Sox (2019–2022); New York Mets (2023); Chicago White Sox (2024)

Daniel Christopher Mendick (born September 28, 1993) is an American former professional baseball infielder. He played in Major League Baseball (MLB) for the Chicago White Sox and New York Mets.

== Amateur career ==
Mendick attended Pittsford Mendon High School in Pittsford, New York and had no college baseball scholarship offers out of high school. He started his college baseball career at Monroe Community College before transferring to the University of Massachusetts Lowell shortly after they became an NCAA Division I baseball program. He was drafted by the Chicago White Sox in the 22nd round of the 2015 Major League Baseball draft.

== Professional career ==
=== Chicago White Sox ===
Mendick made his professional debut with the Arizona League White Sox, hitting .256 with five home runs and 27 RBIs in 49 games. He played 2016 with the Kannapolis Intimidators (with whom he was named a South Atlantic League All-Star honors, Winston-Salem Dash and Charlotte Knights; in 115 games between the three clubs, he slashed .255/.326/.332 with two home runs and 36 RBIs. He played 2017 with Winston-Salem, earning Carolina League All-Star honors and the Birmingham Barons, hitting .256 with ten home runs and 51 RBIs in 125 games, and after the season played in the Arizona Fall League. Mendick played 2018 with Birmingham, batting .247 with 14 home runs and 59 RBIs in 132 games and earning a selection to the Southern League All-Star Game. He started 2019 with Charlotte.

On September 3, 2019, the White Sox selected Mendick's contract and promoted him to the major leagues. He made his major league debut that night versus the Cleveland Indians as a pinch runner. On September 8, Mendick hit his first major league home run off of Jaime Barría of the Los Angeles Angels.

Overall with the 2020 Chicago White Sox, Mendick batted .243 with three home runs and six RBIs in 33 games.

On May 17, 2021, Mendick hit his first career grand slam off of Derek Law of the Minnesota Twins. Overall in 2021, Mendick batted .220 with 2 Home Runs and 20 RBI's. He was added to the White Sox postseason roster in 2021.

Mendick tore his anterior cruciate ligament on June 22, 2022, ending his season. On November 18, he was non-tendered and became a free agent.

=== New York Mets ===
On December 22, 2022, Mendick signed a one-year, $1 million contract with the New York Mets. Mendick was optioned to the Triple-A Syracuse Mets to begin the 2023 season. Mendick was recalled to the Mets after Eduardo Escobar was traded to the Los Angeles Angels. In 33 games for New York, he batted .185/.232/.277 with one home run and four RBI. Following the season on October 20, Mendick was removed from the 40–man roster and sent outright to Triple–A Syracuse. He elected free agency on October 24.

=== Chicago White Sox (second stint) ===
On February 8, 2024, Mendick signed a minor league contract to return to the Chicago White Sox organization. He began the year with the Triple–A Charlotte Knights, hitting .317 with 8 home runs and 20 RBI across 19 contests. On April 22, Mendick had his contract selected to the major league roster. In 47 games for Chicago, he batted .197/.243/.318 with three home runs, eight RBI, and six stolen bases. Mendick was designated for assignment following the signing of Nick Senzel on July 17. He cleared waivers and was sent outright to Triple–A Charlotte on July 19. Mendick elected free agency on September 30.

== Coaching career ==
In 2025, Mendick was hired as a coach for the Florida Complex League Rays, the rookie-level affiliate of the Tampa Bay Rays. In 2026, Mendick was hired as the manager of the Charleston RiverDogs, the Class A affiliate of the Rays.
