= Charles August =

American businessman

Charles J. August
- Born: January 28, 1919; Irondequoit, New York, U.S.
- Died: November 3, 2009 (aged 90); Pittsford, New York, U.S.
- Occupation: Entrepreneur
- Years active: 1957–2009
- Known for: Founder and CEO of Monro Muffler Brake
- Spouse: Jean August
- Children: 3

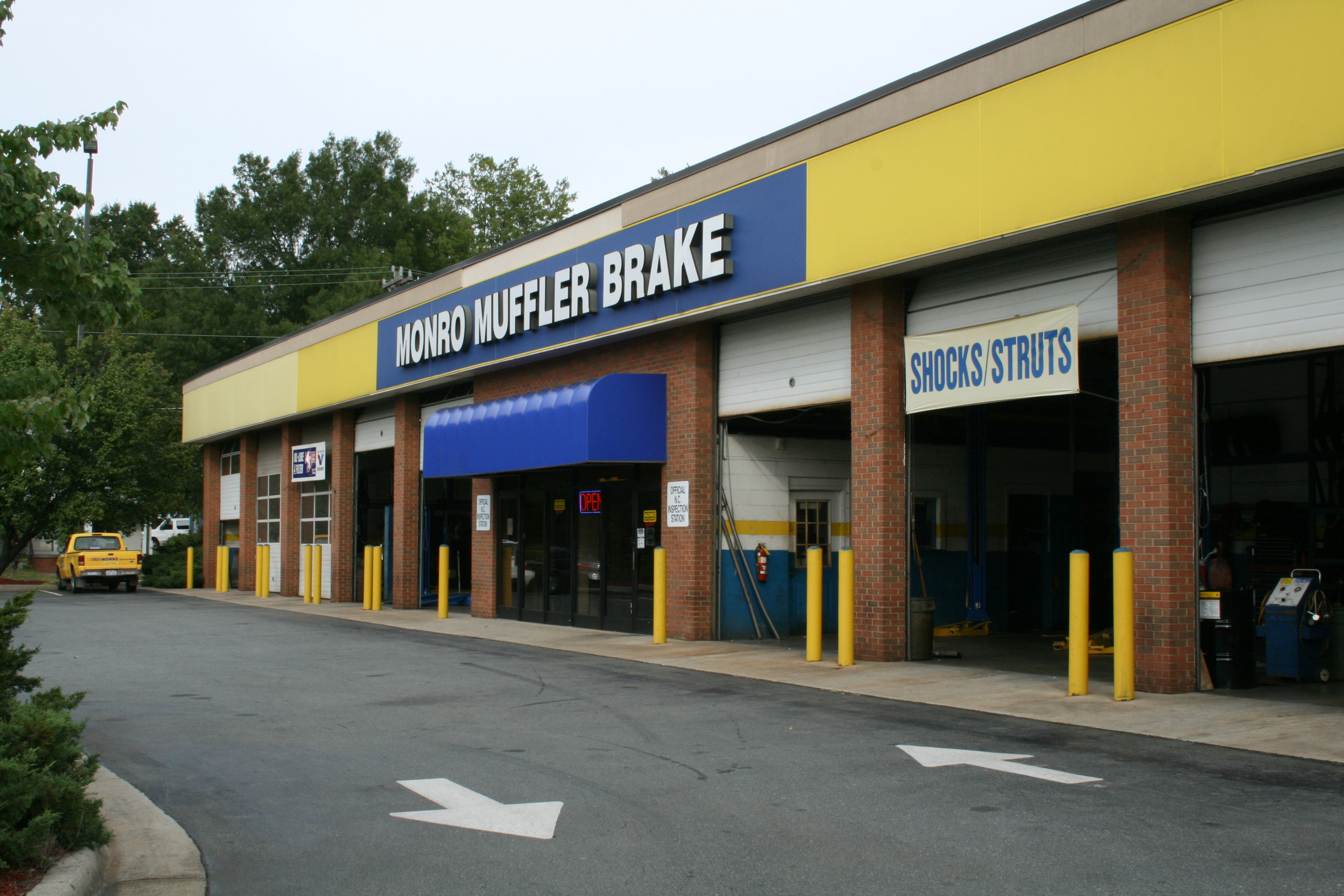
Monro Muffler.

Charles J. August (January 28, 1919 – November 3, 2009) was an American businessman who founded Monro Muffler Brake.

== Biography ==
August's career in automotive maintenance and repair began as a Midas Muffler franchisee in 1957 in Rochester, New York. In 1966, he discontinued his affiliation with Midas. August launched a new company, Monro Muffler, the same year with two business partners, his brother, Burton S. August, and Sheldon Lane. The company was named for Monroe County, New York, except August dropped the "e" in the name. The company later added brake service several years later and was renamed Monro Muffler Brake, Incorporated.

In 1977, Monro Muffler had twenty stores in New York. By the mid-1980s, August's Monro Mufflers had expanded to 59 stores, which sales of $21 million per year. Most of these stores were located in upstate New York.

August sold his controlling interest in Monro Mufflers in 1984 to an investment group headed by Donald Glickman and Peter J. Solomon. The company later had its initial public offering in 1991. August remained as a member of the Monro Muffler board of directors during the 1990s, when the company rapidly expanded. He resigned and retired from the board in 2002.

August actively supported the Boy Scouts during his life. He was a member of the Otetiana Council Boy Scouts of America for more than 60 years, and served as the council's president. He was rewarded the Silver Antelope Award and the Silver Beaver citation for his involvement with the Boy Scouts.

He donated more than $1 million to the United Way of Greater Rochester over a period of 10 years. The United Way awarded August with the Tocqueville Award in 1992.

August was named to the Rochester Business Hall of Fame in 2003. He was a member of the Nathaniel Rochester Society at Rochester Institute of Technology. August was also a founder of the Temple Sinai in Brighton and a member of the board of directors of the Jewish Home Foundation.

August originally resided in Brighton, Monroe County, New York, with his family for many years before moving to nearby Pittsford, New York.

August died on November 3, 2009, at the age of 90. He was survived by his wife, Jean August and three grown children. His memorial service was held at the Temple Sinai in Brighton, New York.
