= Universal Cooperatives =

- Type: agricultural supply cooperative federation
- Industry: agriculture
- Predecessor: United Cooperatives, Inc. and National Cooperatives, Inc
- Founded: 1972
- Fate: Bankruptcy
- Headquarters: Eagan, Minnesota, United States
- Members: 14

Universal Cooperatives, based in Eagan, Minnesota, was a cooperative controlled by 17 regional agricultural marketing and agricultural supply cooperatives. The distribution system included 110 regional feed mills, 26 warehouses, and 7 research farms. The company was formed November 1, 1972 by a merger of United Cooperatives, Inc. of Alliance, Ohio and National Cooperatives, Inc. of Albert Lea, Minnesota. The companies had inter-mixed ownership, leading to merger discussion, and eventual merger. On May 11, 2014, Universal Cooperatives, Inc. and its domestic subsidiaries filed for voluntary Chapter 11 bankruptcy.

== United Cooperatives, Inc. ==
United Cooperatives began in 1930 as Farm Bureau Oil Company, and changed its name in 1936. Founding members include:

- Indiana Farm Bureau Cooperative Association, Indianapolis, Indiana
- Farm Bureau Services, Inc., Lansing, Michigan
- Ohio Farm Bureau Service Company, Columbus, Ohio

== National Cooperatives, Inc. ==
National Cooperatives was founded in 1933 by

- Farm Bureau Oil Company, Indianapolis, Indiana
- Central Cooperative Wholesale, Superior, Wisconsin
- Farmers Union Central Exchange, Saint Paul, Minnesota
- Midland Cooperative Oil Association, Minneapolis, Minnesota
- Union Oil Company (Missouri), in 1935 renamed Consumers Cooperative Association and in 1966 Farmland Industries North Kansas City, Missouri

== Brands ==
Universal owns the CO-OP brand, which is used on tires, batteries, farm chemicals, animal health products, twine, and lubricants. It distributes tires through the Mr. Tire chain.
