= Pittsford Central School District =

Public school district in New York State

Location
- 75 Barker Road; Pittsford NY 14534 Parts of Monroe and Ontario County, New York United States
- Coordinates: 43.0576°N 77.5259°W

District information
- Type: Public
- Motto: "Excellence Today and Tomorrow"
- Grades: K–12
- Established: 1946; 80 years ago
- Superintendent: Michael Pero
- Accreditation: New York State Education Department
- Schools: Five elementary schools (K–5); Two middle schools (6–8); Two senior high schools (9–12)
- Budget: ▲$117,251,229 (2013–2014)
- NCES District ID: 3623160

Students and staff
- Students: ▼5,984 (2011–2012)
- Teachers: ▲810 (2011–2012)
- Staff: ▲384 (2011–2012)

Other information
- Unions: NYSUT, Pittsford District Teachers Association
- Website: www.pittsfordschools.org

The Pittsford Central School District is a public school district in New York State that serves approximately 5,980 students in the towns of Pittsford, Perinton, Penfield, Mendon, and Brighton in Monroe County; and Victor in Ontario County with approximately 800 employees and an operating budget in 2013–2014 of $117,251,229(~$19,607 per student).

The average class size is 20–30 students and the student-teacher ratio is 14:1 (elementary), 12:1 (middle-high school).

Centralized in 1946.

Michael Pero is the Superintendent of Schools, who replaced Mary Alice Price in 2013. Pero previously served as the Assistant Superintendent of Human Resources and as principal of Barker Road Middle School.

== Board of Education ==
The Board of Education consists of seven, non-paid, elected members who reside in the Pittsford Central School District. Members serve three-year terms. Elections are held each May for board members and to vote on the School District Budget.

As of 2022, board members are:

- Robin Scott, Vice President
- Ted Aroesty, President
- Dave Berk
- Emily Kay
- Rene Sanchez-Kazacos
- Jeffrey Casey
- Sarah Pelusio
- Debbie Carpenter, School District Clerk

Superintendents
Name	Tenure
Richard D. Hibschman	1975–1988
Peter P. Horoschak	1988–1992
John P. O'Rourke	1992–2000
Everett L. Larrabee	2000–2001
John J. Eckhardt	2001–2002 (interim)
Mary Alice Price	2002–2013
Michael D. Pero	2013–present

== Schools ==
The Pittsford Central School District operates five elementary, two middle and two high schools across the district. By convention, the district names schools for the road on which they are located.

A major remodeling and construction program was undertaken in 2004. This involved modernization of existing buildings, expansion of Sutherland High School, and the construction of the new Calkins Road Middle School. The Sutherland High School remodeling was completed in 2007, while the construction of Calkins Road Middle School was completed in time for the 2006–2007 school year.

=== Elementary schools ===
Serving grades K through 5:
Student Enrollment (2013) = 2,492

- Allen Creek Elementary (ACE), Principal - Michael Biondi
- Jefferson Road Elementary School (JRE), Principal - Leah Kedley
- Mendon Center Elementary School (MCE), Principal - Heather Clayton
- Park Road Elementary School (PRE), Principal - Mark Balsamo
- Thornell Road Elementary School (TRE), Principal - Edward Foote

=== Middle schools ===
Serving grades 6 through 8:
Student Enrollment (2013) = 1,443

- Barker Road Middle School (BRMS), Principal - Sarah Jacob
- Calkins Road Middle School (CRMS), Principal - Joshua Walker

=== High schools ===
Serving grades 9 through 12:
Student Enrollment (2013) = 2,008

- Pittsford Mendon High School (MHS), Principal - Melissa Julian
- Pittsford Sutherland High School (SHS), Principal - Mark Puma

== Performance ==
In June 2007, the American Music Conference recognized the district as being among the 2007 "Best 100 Communities for Music Education"

In 2007, Park Road Elementary School was named one of 287 schools in the country as a Blue Ribbon School by the United States Department of Education.
