= Pittsford, New York =

Town in Western New York

- Town
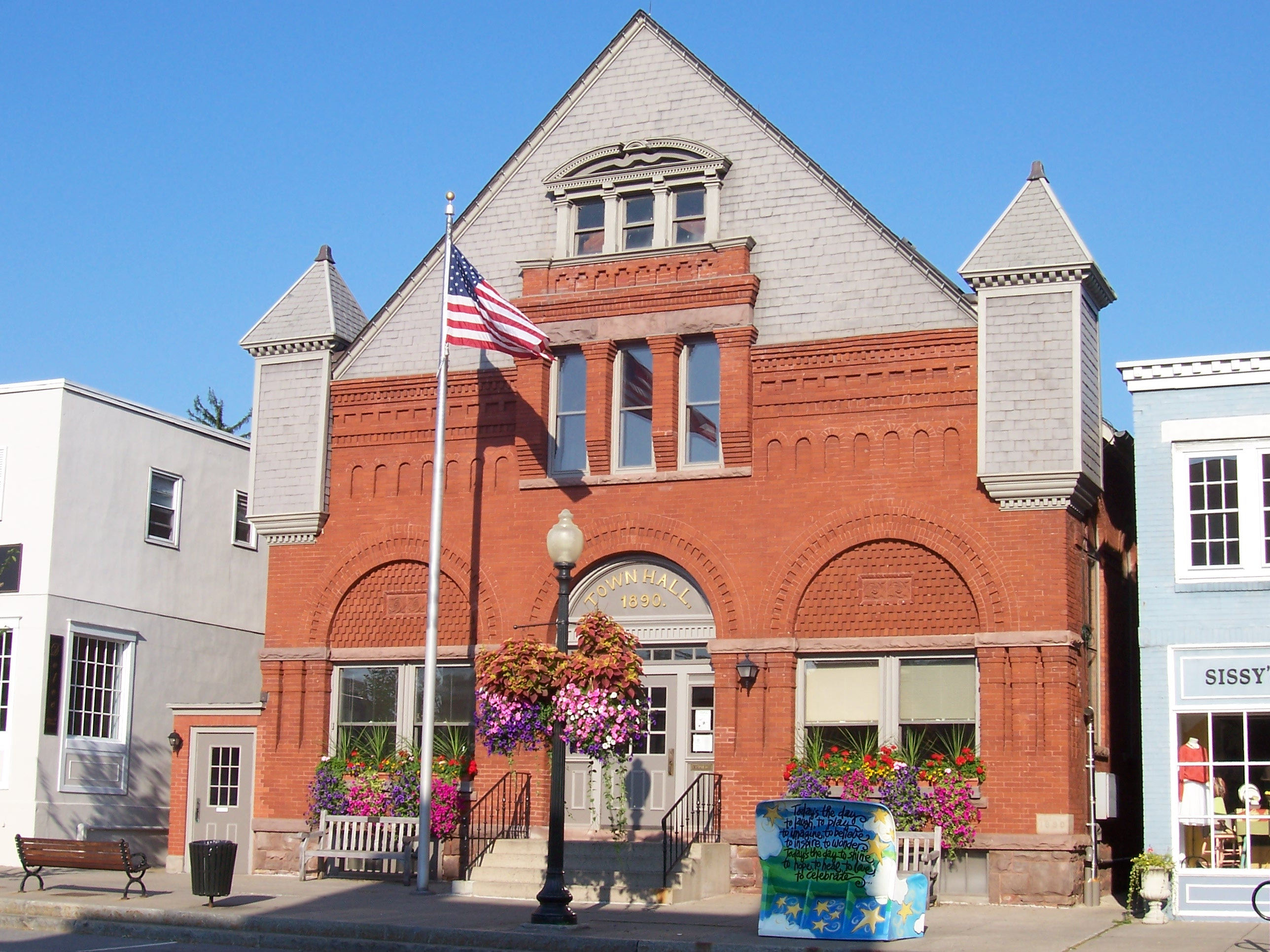
- Pittsford Town Hall

- Location in Monroe County and the state of New York

- Location of New York in the United States
- Coordinates: 43°05′23″N 77°31′0″W
- Country: United States
- State: New York
- County: Monroe
- Incorporated: March 25, 1814; 212 years ago

Government
  - Town supervisor: William A. Smith Jr. (R) elected 2013 Town Board: Naveen Havannavar - Deputy Supervisor(D); Michael Arcuri (D); Cha Ron Sattler-Leblanc (D); Cathy Koshykar (D)

Area
  - Total: 23.41 sq mi (60.6 km^{2})
  - Land: 23.18 sq mi (60.0 km^{2})
  - Water: 0.22 sq mi (0.57 km^{2})
- Elevation: 564 ft (172 m)

Population (2020)
  - Total: 30,617 ▲
  - Density: 1,320.67/sq mi (509.91/km^{2})
- Time zone: UTC−5 (EST)
  - Summer (DST): UTC−4 (EDT)
- ZIP Codes: 14534 (Pittsford); 14445 (East Rochester); 14467 (Henrietta); 14610, 14618, 14625 (Rochester)
- Area code: 585
- FIPS code: 36-055-58365
- Website: www.townofpittsford.org

Pittsford is an incorporated town in Monroe County, New York, United States. A suburb of Rochester, its population was 30,617 at the time of the 2020 census. Formerly part of the town of Northfield, Pittsford was settled in 1789 and incorporated in 1796. The village of Pittsford was incorporated in 1827. It was named by Colonel Caleb Hopkins, a War of 1812 hero and subsequently Pittsford town supervisor, for the town of his birth, Pittsford, Vermont. The Erie Canal passes through the town.

== History ==
The town is situated within the region subject to the Marquis de Denonville's expedition of 1,600 French soldiers, 400 Canadian colonials, and 983 Native American allies in 1687, for the purpose of punishing the Seneca tribe, the foremost nation of the Iroquois Indian Confederacy, for their connection with the English and their interference in the lucrative French fur trade.

In 1788, Massachusetts abandoned its claim to this region in favor of New York. Oliver Phelps and Nathaniel Gorham of Connecticut settled with the state of Massachusetts for a title of land in western New York. On July 8, 1788, Oliver and Nathaniel met with the Senecas and signed the Treaty of Buffalo Creek at Geneseo in Livingston County where the Indians were paid for their title. The District of Northfield was formed in Ontario County in 1792. This became the town of Northfield in 1796. What is now the village of Pittsford was settled the same year. As Northfield, which was renamed Boyle in 1808 and again to Smallwood in 1813, was subdivided in the following years, a final split formed the towns of Pittsford and Brighton in 1814.

The completion of the Erie Canal in 1825 led to increased development of the various towns in western New York along its route. Proximity to Rochester via canal and the Genesee River proved beneficial to the village of Pittsford too.

The Auburn and Rochester Railroad arrived in 1840, providing faster passenger service than the canal. This line soon became part of the New York Central operation and was in use until 1960. The enlarged Erie Canal continued to provide cheap transportation to the mills of Rochester though. By 1918, the modern barge canal was in service, following the same route as older canals, but widened and deepened.

The Adsit Cobblestone Farmhouse, Cole Cobblestone Farmhouse, Gates-Livermore Cobblestone Farmhouse, Mendon Cobblestone Academy, Mendon Presbyterian Church, Miller–Horton–Barben Farm, Sheldon Cobblestone House, Stewart Cobblestone Farmhouse, and Whitcomb Cobblestone Farmhouse are listed on the National Register of Historic Places.

== Geography ==
Pittsford is in the southeastern portion of Monroe County approximately seven miles (11 km) southeast of the city of Rochester. The town of Mendon lies to the south, the town of Perinton to the east, the towns of Henrietta and Brighton to the west, and the towns of Brighton and Penfield to the north of Pittsford. The town of East Rochester borders the northeast corner of Pittsford.

According to the U.S. Census Bureau, the town of Pittsford has a total area of 23.4 square miles (61 km^{2}), of which 23.2 square miles (60 km^{2}) are land and 0.2 square miles (0.5 km^{2}), or 0.96%, are water.

== Demographics ==
Historical population
Census	Pop.	Note	%±
1820	1,582		—
1830	1,832		15.8%
1840	1,983		8.2%
1850	2,061		3.9%
1860	2,028		−1.6%
1870	1,974		−2.7%
1880	2,236		13.3%
1890	2,129		−4.8%
1900	2,373		11.5%
1910	3,634		53.1%
1920	4,614		27.0%
1930	7,192		55.9%
1940	7,741		7.6%
1950	9,413		21.6%
1960	15,156		61.0%
1970	25,058		65.3%
1980	26,743		6.7%
1990	24,497		−8.4%
2000	27,219		11.1%
2010	29,405		8.0%
2020	30,617		4.1%
U.S. Decennial Census 2020

As of the census of 2000, there were 27,219 people, 9,448 households, and 7,341 families residing in the town. The population density was 1,173.7 inhabitants per square mile (453.2/km^{2}). There were 9,709 housing units at an average density of 418.6 per square mile (161.6/km^{2}). The racial makeup of the town was 92.61% White, 1.60% Black or African American, 0.08% Native American, 4.57% Asian, 0.02% Pacific Islander, 0.34% from other races, and 0.77% from two or more races. Hispanic or Latino of any race were 1.30% of the population.

There were 9,448 households, out of which 37.1% had children under the age of 18 living with them, 70.4% were married couples living together, 5.5% had a female householder with no husband present, and 22.3% were non-families. Of all households, 19.1% were made up of individuals, and 9.5% had someone living alone who was 65 years of age or older. The average household size was 2.65 and the average family size was 3.05.

In the town, the population was spread out, with 25.4% under the age of 18, 9.4% from 18 to 24, 22.1% from 25 to 44, 27.3% from 45 to 64, and 15.9% who were 65 years of age or older. The median age was 41 years. For every 100 females, there were 87.6 males. For every 100 females age 18 and over, there were 84.0 males.

The median income for a household in the town was $109,344, and the median income for a family was $119,509. Males had a median income of $70,780 versus $39,336 for females. The per capita income for the town was $42,723. About 1.5% of families and 2.9% of the population were below the poverty line, including 2.8% of those under age 18 and 6.2% of those age 65 or over.

== Greenprint ==
In 1996 the "Greenprint Plan" was adopted to preserve open space from the encroaching development that had taken so much of the town's countryside since the 1960s. The Greenprint involved the town's purchase of development rights to what was then two-thirds of Pittsford's remaining farmland. Initiated and successfully carried through by Supervisor William A. Carpenter, with passage of the Greenprint, Pittsford became the first town in the State of New York to save open space by purchasing development rights. In the years since, Pittsford's Greenprint has been recognized nationally and remains a frequently-cited example of successful open space preservation.

== Education ==
Public schools are administered by the Pittsford Central School District.

The district has received the New York State Governor's Excelsior Award for quality. It costs $13,900 per year to educate a Pittsford student. Barker Road Middle School and Calkins Road Middle School have also received an award in 2006 and 2009 as one of the national "Schools to Watch".

The district has two high schools, Pittsford Sutherland and Pittsford Mendon. Sutherland plays its athletics as the Knights while Mendon students are known as the Vikings. In sports for in which the two high schools combine to form a single team, such as football and lacrosse, they are known as the Panthers. The two schools have a long-standing rivalry in basketball, culminating with the annual Rainbow Classic game held at the University of Rochester. The Rainbow Classic is an annual fundraiser to support Golisano Children's Hospital. The Rainbow Classic was created in memory of Katelyn Pasley, who was treated at the Golisano Children's Hospital before she died. In addition, when Ryan McCluski died in 2004 after treatment at the hospital, the Pasley and McCluski families joined together to turn the tragedies into something positive for the community. The event has raised hundreds of thousands of dollars for Golisano Children's Hospital. Adding to the many successful sports teams in Pittsford, NY, the Pittsford Mendon Vikings soccer team has a strong tradition, holding the New York State record of seven state championships. Pittsford's swimming program is ranked overall 22nd in the nation, with girls being ranked 12th and having won 14 straight sectional championships, and boys being ranked 22nd, having won 13 straight titles. Pittsford Mendon has fielded several very strong cross country teams in the past decade and a half.

The district has renovated many of its schools and built some entirely new facilities. In 2006, it completed work on Calkins Road Middle School, a middle school for students that will be attending Sutherland High School. The other middle school is Barker Road.

The Pittsford Central School District also operates five elementary schools: Jefferson, Park, Thornell, Mendon Center, and Allen Creek. They are all named for the roads on which they're located.

Pittsford is home to Allendale Columbia School, a leading independent, co-educational college preparatory school for students in grades Nursery through 12. Allendale offers a combined interscholastic sports program in Grades 7–12 with The Harley School, also a Nursery - 12 independent school in the neighboring town of Brighton. The Harley-Allendale Columbia teams are affiliated with the New York State Public High School Athletic Association, Section V and the Finger Lakes Athletic Association.

Pittsford is also home to St. Louis School, a Roman Catholic school offering a program from preschool to grade 6, operated by the St. Louis Parish in Pittsford.

Two colleges are located in Pittsford: St. John Fisher College and Nazareth College.

The Rochester Japanese School (RJS; ロチェスター日本語補習校; Rochesutā Nihongo Hoshūkō), a weekend Japanese program, is held at the Christ Clarion Presbyterian Church of Pittsford.

== Media ==
The Brighton-Pittsford Post was Pittsford's local weekly newspaper and was in print since 1942. As of 2021, it apparently has ceased publication.

== Industry and commerce ==
Pittsford's access to the Erie Canal was the main driver of commerce in the late 19th and early 20th centuries. Some of the old buildings and barns on the canal have been converted into restaurants, cafes and shops. Concerts, boat tours, and other events highlight this area in the warmer months.

Two large malls, Eastview Mall in Victor, and The Marketplace Mall in Henrietta, and Pittsford Plaza, a large shopping center located on NY 31 on the west side of the town are important commercial areas. Pittsford is the home of one of the largest Wegmans stores in the state. The Pittsford store is both the flagship store and a major test center for the company, as it is used to test out new ideas, such as mini-restaurants, and small pet stores attached to the main building.

Pittsford is home to five country clubs: Oak Hill Country Club, Irondequoit Country Club, Monroe Golf Club, Country Club of Rochester, and Locust Hill Country Club.

The Pittsford Chamber of Commerce works with businesses in the Town and Village of Pittsford.

== Parks ==
Pittsford has 11 town parks within its borders. Great Embankment and Thornell Farm Park include several athletic fields, while Lock 32 and the Erie Canal trail offer a look at the historic double lock. The Isaac Gordon Nature Park offers hiking trails and cross-country skiing. Two Monroe County parks can also be found in Pittsford: Powder Mills Park and Mendon Ponds Park. Powder Mill has a ski lift and a creek that is popular with trout fishermen, while Mendon Ponds includes a vast trail system and unique geology.

== Sports ==
Professional golf regularly comes to Pittsford. From 1977 through 2014, the LPGA Championship was held in the town, at Locust Hill Country Club for all but the last year, when the tournament was held at Monroe Golf Club. Oak Hill Country Club, located in Pittsford, hosted the 1995 Ryder Cup, the 1956, 1968 and 1989 United States Opens and the 1980, 2003, 2013 and 2023 PGA Championships. The Xerox Classic was a golf tournament on the Nationwide Tour from 2005 to 2008 played in August at Irondequoit Country Club, also in Pittsford.

The NFL Buffalo Bills hold their summer training camp each August at St. John Fisher College.

The University Athletic Association is based in Pittsford. Sports teams of both Pittsford high schools and the Harley-Allendale Columbia teams are regularly featured in the weekly Brighton-Pittsford Post.

== Agriculture ==
Before the onset of rapid suburban development in the 1950s, Pittsford was a largely agricultural community with a distinct rural character, home to many family-owned farms. Remaining farms today include the Knickerbocker farm on Knickerbocker Road in the southeast part of town, where the family has been growing corn, wheat and other crops for more than 150 years. Other significant family farms still operating include the Hopkins Farm on Clover Street, the Powers Farm behind the Village, the Willard Farm and the Sweeney Farm. Pittsford's Greenprint plan, described above, in 1996 preserved for future generations to come two-thirds of the remaining farmland in the Town. The Town government remains committed to using planning techniques with a view toward conserving open space for the future.

== Government ==
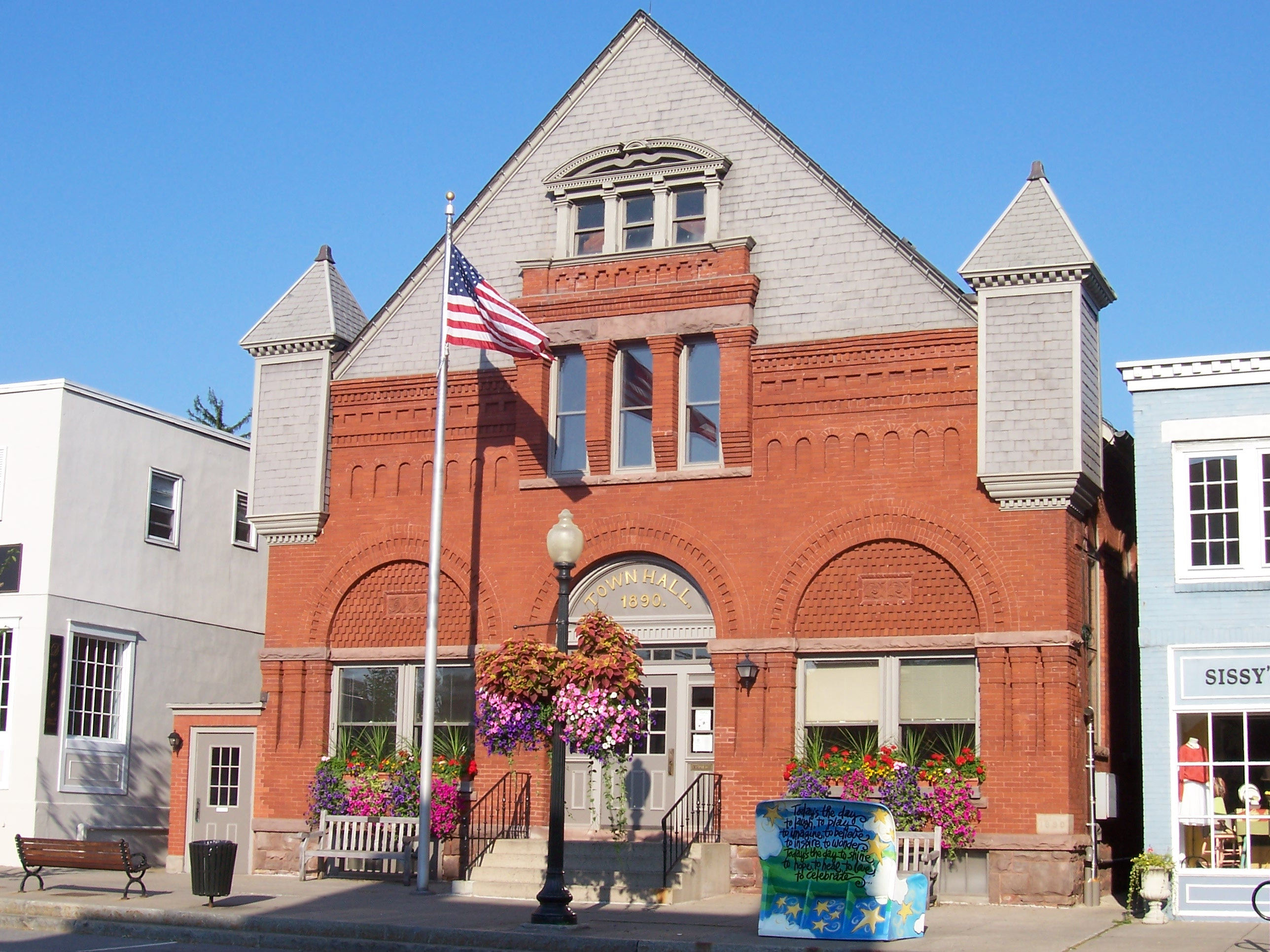
Pittsford town hall

The town is governed by an elected town supervisor and four elected members of the town board. The current town supervisor is William A. Smith, Jr., first elected in November 2013.

As of 2026, the current members of the town board are Naveen Havannavar, Cathy Koshykar, Michael Arcuri, and Cha Ron Sattler-Lablanc.

Officers appointed by the supervisor and town board include the town clerk Renee McQuillan, and the commissioner of public works, Paul Schenkel.

Town justices are Maroun Ajaka, reelected in 2024, and Rich Murajda, elected in 2025.

Town supervisors
Name	Tenure	Name	Tenure	Name	Tenure
Silas Nye	1796–1797; 1799	William C. Rawley	1854	Paul M. Spiegel	1966–1987
Noah Norton	1798	Thomas Wilcox	1857	Margaret Freeman	1988–1993
Ezra Patterson	1800–1804; 1806–1807; 1811; 1814	Isaac Sutherland	1858	William A. Carpenter	1994–November 2012
Augustus Griswold	1805	Daniel Kingsley	1859–1860; 1863	Sandra J. Zutes	Appointed to vacancy 12/2012-12/2013
William McKinstry	1808	Jarvis Lord	1861	William A. Smith, Jr.	January 2014–present
Caleb Hopkins	1809	Nathan K. Welch	1864		
Stephen Lusk	1810; 1826–1828	Patrick Malone	1865–1872; 1879		
Samuel Spafford	1812–1813	Francis A. Scherer	1873–1874		
Nathan Nye	1815–1816	George A. Goss	1875–1877; 1880; 1888–1898		
Samuel Fall	1817	Samuel H. Stone	1878; 1884–1885		
Simon Stone III	1818–1825	J.M. Wiltse	1881–1883		
Nathan Calhoun	1829–1832; 1838–1839	Thomas Spiegel	1886–1887		
John Armstrong	1833–1834	Burton N. Wiltse	1898–1899		
Ephraim Goss	1835–1836; 1847–1848; 1855	Charles G. Schoen	1899–1903		
Solomon Stone	1837; 1843–1845; 1856	Jared W. Hopkins	1904–1909; 1925–1931		
Marvin Hopkins	1840; 1842; 1846; 1850; 1862	George A. Hicks	1910–1925		
Ira Bellows	1841	Howard R. Bacon	1932–1933		
Wales M. Huntington	1849	Charles H. Westerman	1934–1943		
Elias Matthews	1851	Edward D. Seward	1944–1959		
Horace Wheeler	1852–1853	F. Ross Zornow	1960–1965		

== Emergency response ==
Access to emergency services is obtained by dialing 911, which connects the caller to the city of Rochester's emergency communications department (911 center). The Monroe County sheriff's department provides primary law enforcement for the town.

The Pittsford Volunteer Fire Department consists of about 75 members who respond to roughly 800 calls per year providing fire protection, rescue, and non-transport emergency medical services for the town. There are two fire stations, one of which is located in the village.

Pittsford Volunteer Ambulance provides basic life support and advanced life support with trained emergency medical technicians and paramedics.

== Notable people ==
- Johnny Antonelli, Major League Baseball (MLB) pitcher who won the 1954 World Series with the New York Giants
- Charles August, businessman and founder of Monro Muffler Brake
- Tyson Beckford, model and actor
- Paige Conners (born 2000), Israeli-American pairs figure skater who competed at the 2018 Winter Olympics
- Pete Correale, stand-up comedian, broadcaster, and writer
- Mary Therese Friel, Miss New York USA 1979 and Miss USA 1979
- John Curran, film director
- Nicole Fiscella, played "Isabel Coates" on Gossip Girl
- Steve Gadd, jazz drummer attended high school in Pittsford
- Teddy Geiger, pop musician and songwriter
- Ephraim Goss (1806–1877), lawyer and state senator
- C. R. Hagen, noted professor of particle physics at the University of Rochester
- Mike Jones, Major League Baseball player
- David Lanz, Grammy-nominated New Age pianist
- Christopher Lasch, historian, moralist, and social critic
- Chris Lillis, Olympic athlete; gold medalist at the 2022 Beijing Winter Olympics
- Henry Lomb, co-founder of Bausch & Lomb Company
- Pamela Melroy, astronaut
- Danny Mendick, professional baseball player
- Kaitlin Monte, USO Show Troupe, Miss New York 2011
- Cathy Morse, professional golfer
- Adam Podlesh, professional football player
- Henrik Rummel, Olympic athlete; won a bronze medal at the 2012 London Olympic Games
- Magnus Sheffield, professional cyclist
- Pam Sherman, Gannett columnist known as "The Suburban Outlaw"
- Joy Tanner, Nora MacDonald on Disney's Life With Derek
- Abby Wambach, soccer player
- Leehom Wang, Mando-pop singer-songwriter
- Gerald B. Zornow (1916–1984), chairman, Eastman Kodak

== Communities and locations ==
- Cartersville, a location on the Erie Canal on NY 96, home to the Cartersville Guard Gate
- Pittsford village, centrally located in the town on Routes 96 (Main Street) and 31 (State Street)
