= Pittsford Sutherland High School =

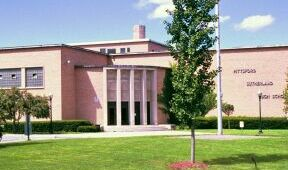
- Sutherland's entrance, 50 years before the renovation

Location
- 55 Sutherland Street; Pittsford, Monroe Country, New York 14534; United States
- Coordinates: 43°05′15″N 77°31′24″W

Information
- School type: public, high school
- Opened: 1957; 69 years ago
- School district: Pittsford Central School District
- Superintendent: Michael Pero
- CEEB code: 334530
- Principal: Mark Puma
- Teaching staff: 87.58 (FTE)
- Grades: 9–12
- Gender: Co-educational
- Enrollment: 927 (2019-20)
- Student to teacher ratio: 10.58
- Campus: Suburban
- Colors: Navy Blue and Gold
- Mascot: Knights
- Rival: Pittsford Mendon Vikings; Brighton Barons
- USNWR ranking: 240
- Website: shs.pittsfordschools.org

Pittsford Sutherland High School is a public high school in suburban Rochester, Monroe County in upstate New York. In 2021, the school was ranked in the top 2 percent (#319 nationwide; #36 in New York) in U.S. News & World Report's annual evaluation of nearly 18,000 public high schools.

== Notable alumni ==
- Marty Byrnes, basketball player, first round pick in 1978 NBA draft
- John Curran, director of The Painted Veil
- John F. Harris, journalist; founder, Politico; author, The Survivor: Bill Clinton in the White House, Random House, May 2005.
- Pete Pfitzinger, distance runner, author, 2 time Olympian
- Chyna (Joan Marie Laurer), American professional wrestler, glamour model, author, and bodybuilder
- Adam Podlesh, aka the hammer, NFL punter
- Morgan Schild, American freestyle mogul skier, 2018 olympian
- Leehom Wang, C-pop singer, producer, actor, musician

== Feeder patterns ==
Allen Creek, Jefferson Road, and the northern part of Mendon Center Elementary Schools feed into Calkins Road Middle School, then to Pittsford Sutherland High School.
