= 2015 Horizon League softball tournament =

Sports tournament

- Teams: 6
- Format: Double-elimination tournament
- Finals site: Oakland Softball Stadium; Rochester, Michigan
- Television: ESPN3

The 2015 Horizon League softball tournament was held at Oakland Softball Stadium on the campus of Oakland University in Rochester Hills, Michigan from May 6 through May 9, 2015. The tournament winner earned the Horizon League's automatic bid to the 2015 NCAA Division I softball tournament. All games were broadcast on ESPN3.

== Format ==
The Horizon League Tournament takes the top 6 teams and places them in a double elimination tournament. Seeds 1 and 2 get a bye to the 2nd Round.

== Tournament ==
Upper round 1	Upper round 2	Upper final	Final
1	Oakland	6
4	Green Bay	6	4	Green Bay	5
6	Cleveland State	5	1	Oakland	1
2	UIC	0
2	UIC	1
3	Wright State	1	5	Valparaiso	0
5	Valparaiso	7
1	Oakland	7	–
3	Wright State	3	–
Lower round 1	Lower round 2	Lower round 3	Lower final
2	UIC	5
3	Wright State	5	3	Wright State	6^{(11)}
3	Wright State	4	4	Green Bay	3
3	Wright State	1	5	Valparaiso	3
6	Cleveland State	0

- All times listed are Eastern Daylight Time.
