= 2021 Horizon League softball tournament =

- Teams: 4
- Format: Double-elimination tournament
- Finals site: YSU Softball Complex; Youngstown, Ohio
- Champions: UIC (10th title)

The 2021 Horizon League softball tournament is being held at the YSU Softball Complex on the campus of Youngstown State University in Youngstown, Ohio from May 13 through May 15, 2021. The tournament winner will earn the Horizon League's automatic bid to the 2021 NCAA Division I softball tournament

== Tournament ==
=== Bracket ===
Thursday, May 13
1	Youngstown State	7
4	RMU	0
Winner's bracket
2	Oakland	1
3	UIC	5
2	Oakland	5
4	RMU	4
Loser's bracket

Friday, May 14
1	Youngstown State	4
3	UIC	5
2	Oakland	3
1	Youngstown State	0

Saturday, May 15
3	UIC	4	–
2	Oakland	3	–
