= Caleb Hopkins (colonel) =

Colonel Caleb Hopkins

United States Collector of Customs Port of Genesee
- In office 1809–1817
- President: James Madison

Personal details
- Born: 1770 Pittsford, Vermont
- Died: January 14, 1818 (aged 47–48) Pittsford, New York
- Resting place: Pittsford, New York

Military service
- Allegiance: United States of America
- Branch/service: (New York (state)) New York Militia
- Years of service: 1804 – 1816
- Rank: Colonel
- Commands: Commanding officer 52nd Regiment, New York Militia (1814)
- Battles/wars: War of 1812: Raid at Charlotte

Colonel Caleb Hopkins (1770 – January 14, 1818) was an officer during the War of 1812 and the first town supervisor of Pittsford, New York, United States.

== History ==
In 1791, Caleb Hopkins moved from his hometown, Pittsford, Vermont, in Rutland County, to what is now Monroe County, New York, and built the first log dwelling in the present town of Penfield. In 1800, he moved to the town of Northfield and built a house about 0.5 miles (0.80 km) south of the present village of Pittsford. The Hopkins Homestead is identified by a historic marker at 3151 Clover Street.

Hopkins became a prominent businessman in Pittsford as a farmer and in mercantile pursuits. In 1808, he was appointed supervisor of the town of Boyle (which later became Pittsford). In 1809, President James Madison appointed him United States collector of customs for the port of Genesee (now Rochester, New York), a post he held until May 1817.

In 1814, the town of Smallwood was divided into Brighton and Pittsford, and Colonel Hopkins named the latter in honor of his birthplace in Vermont. In 1816 and 1817, he was a member of the general assembly of New York and served on the committee in military affairs.

Colonel Hopkins is buried alongside his wife, Dorothea Mabee, and their three children (Clarissa, James and Marvin) in the Pioneer Burying Ground cemetery 1 mile (1.6 km) south of the village of Pittsford.

== War of 1812 ==
In 1804, Hopkins was commissioned as a lieutenant of the militia, and was promoted to major in 1807. He was active in the War of 1812, attaining lieutenant colonel in 1812 and colonel in 1813. He was involved in several battles and skirmishes and once was wounded in the shoulder. In March 1816, Colonel Hopkins was commissioned as brigadier general for gallant service during the war, including defending the Port of Charlotte, Rochester, New York against the British.

== Later life ==
In March 1816, Colonel Hopkins was commissioned as brigadier general for his service during the war, including the defense of the Port of Charlotte, Rochester, New York.
