= Monro Muffler Brake =

American automotive holding company

Monro, Inc.
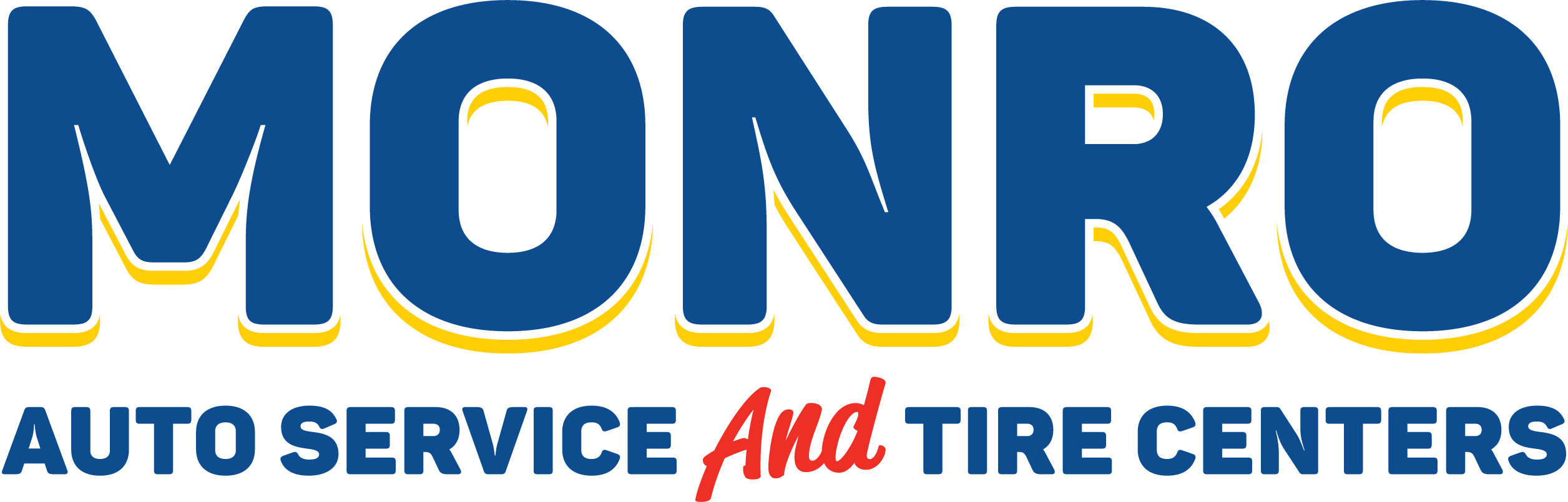
- Formerly: Monro Muffler (1966–1975); Monro Muffler Brake, Inc. (1975–1991)
- Type: Public
- Traded as: Nasdaq: MNRO (Class A)
- Founded: 1957; 69 years ago (as a Midas Muffler Franchise); 1966; 60 years ago (as Monro Muffler); Rochester, New York, U.S.
- Founder: Charles J. August
- Headquarters: Rochester, New York, U.S.
- Number of locations: 1,288 (2022)
- Key people: Michael Broderick (president & CEO)
- Revenue: ▲US$1.2 billion (2019)
- Operating income: ▲US$126 million (2019)
- Net income: ▲US$79.8 million (2019)
- Total assets: ▲US$1.3 billion (2019)
- Total equity: ▲US$699 million (2019)
- Number of employees: ▲8,750 (2021)
- Subsidiaries: Monro Auto Service and Tire Centers; Mr. Tire Auto Service Centers; Tire Choice Auto Service Centers; Tire Barn Warehouse; Tire Warehouse; Ken Towery Tire & Auto Care; Free Service Tire Company, Inc.; Mountain View Tire & Auto Service; Allen Tire Company; Monro Commercial Solutions; Car-X Tire and Auto; Skip’s Tire; Lloyd’s Tire; Calabasas Car Care; Bud’s Tires; Ayers Repairs
- Website: monro.com

Monro, Inc. is an automotive services company founded and headquartered in Rochester, New York, U.S. As of 2025, Monro has 1,260 locations making them the second-largest automotive services company in North America after Driven Brands by number of locations and by revenue.

The company operates under several regional brands, including Monro Auto Service & Tire Centers, Mr. Tire Auto Service Centers, Tread Quarters Discount Tire Auto Service Centers, Autotire Car Care Centers, Ken Towery's Tire & AutoCare, Tire Warehouse Tires for Less, and Tire Barn Warehouse.

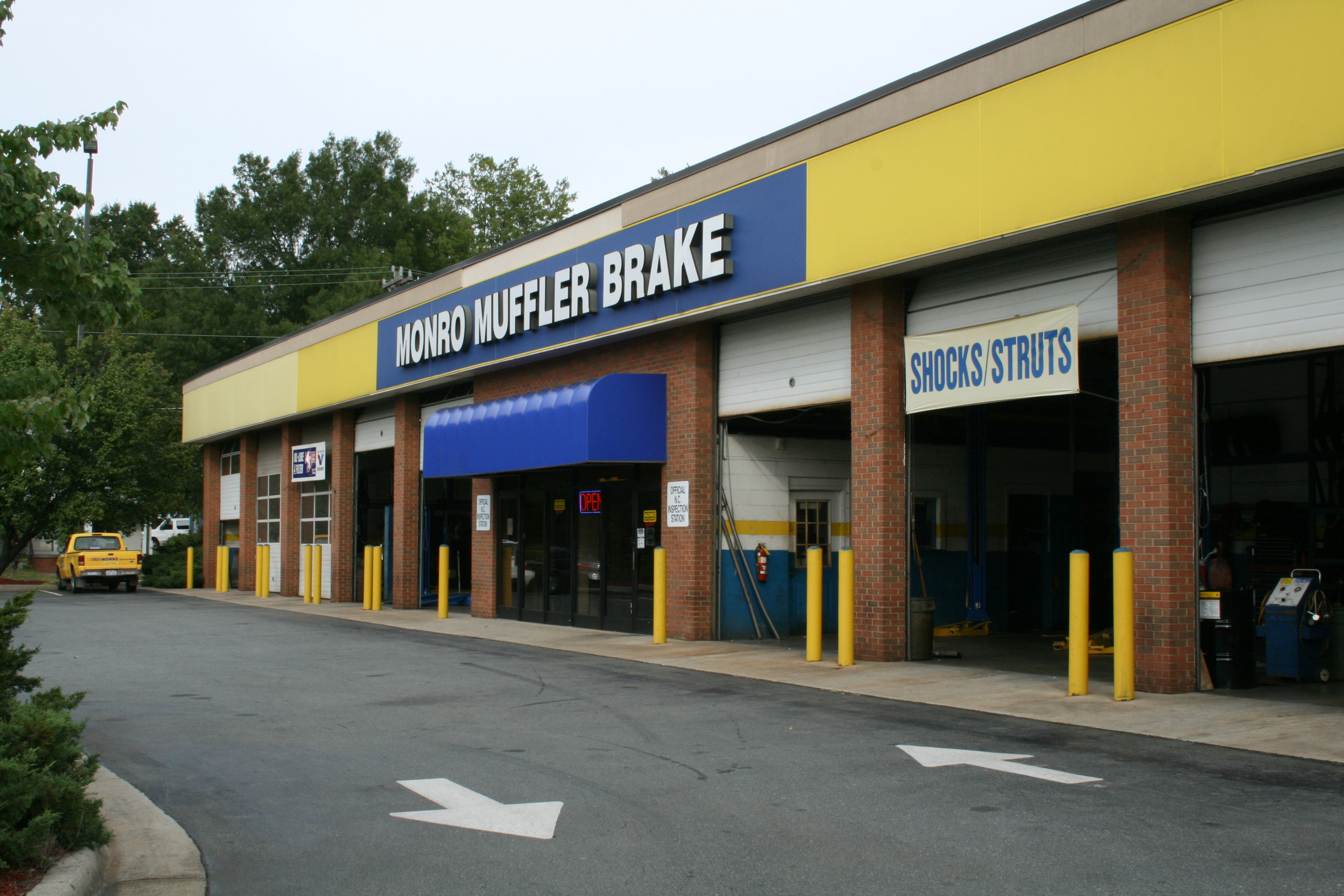
Monro Auto Service and Tire Center in Durham, North Carolina.

== Company history ==
=== Early history ===
The company was founded by Charles J. August in 1957, originally as a franchise of another company, Midas Muffler.

In the mid-1960s, August decided that his muffler shops should offer an expanded list of services. In 1966, he discontinued his affiliation with Midas Muffler and launched a new muffler service company under the name Monro Muffler with his brother, Burton S. August, and Sheldon Lane. August named the new company after Monroe County, New York, but without the "e" at the end of the name. August added brake services several years later and renamed the company, Monro Muffler Brake, Inc.

Monro began a deliberate course of prudent expansion, arriving at 20 stores by 1977. The company had a warehouse on West Henrietta Road. By the end of 1979, it had about 43 stores in New York. From this warehouse, drivers would load the trucks and deliver to all the 43 stores throughout New York.

=== Public company ===
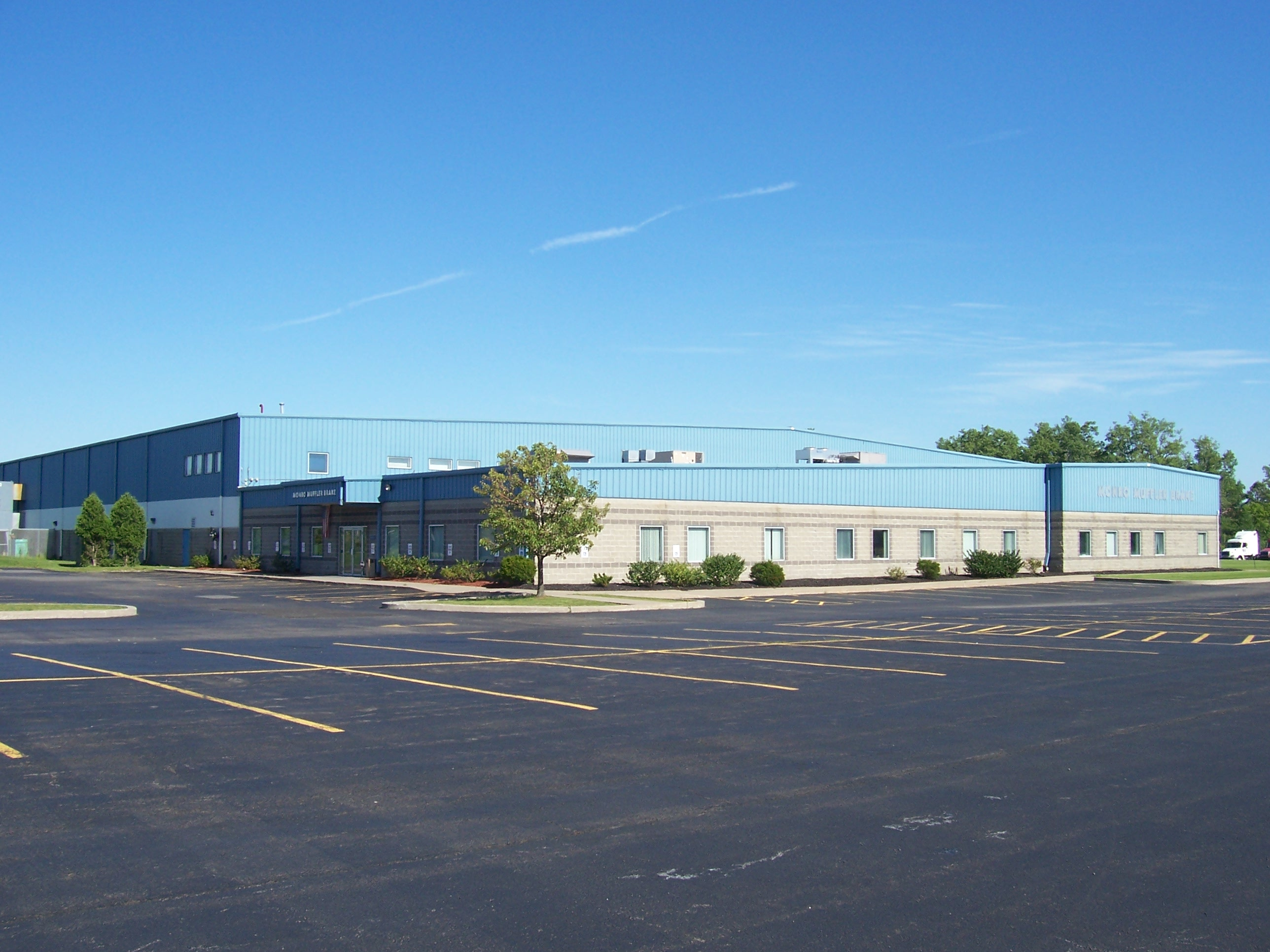
Headquarters in Rochester, New York

By the 1980s, Monro instituted a more aggressive expansion program when the company began to make a number of large acquisitions. By the mid-1980s, there were 59 stores which generated $21 million in sales annually. Most of those locations were in upstate New York.

In 1984, the company's founder, Charles J. August sold his controlling interest in Monro Muffler and Brake to a New York City-based investors group headed by Donald Glickman and Peter J. Solomon. There were 59 stores at this point. August remained on the company's board of directors until 2002.

In 1991, Monro Muffler made its initial public offering. Monro's shares began to be publicly traded on NASDAQ under the symbol "MNRO". By this time, the company has grown to 143 locations. In the mid-90s, Monro aggressive expansion campaign under CEO Larry Day that doubled the size of the company. However, he unexpectedly left in 1998 and was replaced by Robert G. Gross. In September 1998, the company purchased all 205 Speedy Muffler King locations within the United States from Speedy Muffler King, Inc. of Toronto, Canada. Despite the industry's positive reaction to the deal, Monro struggled financially in 1999, partially due to difficulties from the acquisition.

=== Expansion into tire business ===
Monro expanded into the tire business during the 2000s. In 2002, it acquired Kimmel Automotive Inc, and its 34 Kimmel Tire & Auto and Tread Quarters stores in Maryland and Virginia. In 2004, Monro purchased five Rice Tires locations and 26 Mr. Tire stores, followed by another 10 stores in 2005. In November 2005, Monro acquired a 13% stake in the 101-store Strauss Discount Auto chain, with options to acquire buy the rest of the company by April 2007. However, by August 2006, Strauss had declared bankruptcy and Monro chose not to exercise its purchase option.

In 2006, Monro obtained 75 ProCare shops from bankruptcy, converting 44 to Monro Muffler Brake & Service centers and 31 to Mr. Tire outlets; the shops had previously been owned by Standard Oil of Ohio and BP prior to their bankruptcy. It acquired Valley Forge Tire & Auto Centers, based in Valley Forge, Pennsylvania, and Craven Tire & Auto, based in Baileys Crossroads, Virginia, in 2007. The purchases added 19 retail stores to Monro’s portfolio, all of which were rebranded under the Mr. Tire name. That August, Gross was also named chairman of the company. In 2009, Monro also purchased 26 Autotire Car Care Centers for $10 million as well as 46 Tire Warehouse Central stores for $34 million.

In 2010, Monro acquired Import Export Tire Co., a five-store tire and auto repair chain in the Pittsburgh, Pennsylvania metro region, and Courthouse Tire, a three-store tire and undercar care facilities in the Fredericksburg, Virginia. In June 2011, the company purchased 24 Vespia Tire Center locations in New Jersey and Pennsylvania. Monro also bought six Terry’s Tire Town stores in October, turning them into Monro Muffler Brake locations.

In March 2012, the company acquired the Norfolk, Virginia-based Kramer Tire Co., which operated 20 retail locations, two wholesale tire centers, and two truck tire centers at the time. Later that year, it bought 18 Colony Tire retail stores in North Carolina and Virginia in exchange for the Kramer assets. Gross was appointed executive chairman and president John Van Heel was named CEO starting in October. In November 2012, Monro acquired Tire Barn Warehouse, which operated 32 stores in Illinois, Indiana and Tennessee. At the time, it was considered the 34th largest independent tire dealer chain in the U.S. In December, it purchased Enger Auto Service & Tires, Tire King Complete Car Care, and Ken Towery's Tire & AutoCare, a 27-store chain based in Kentucky and Indiana.

By May 2013, Monro carried 937 stores in 22 states. It bought the 10-store Curry's Auto Service chain in the Washington D.C. metro area in July. In November, Monro bought four of the eight S&S Tire & Auto Service Centers based in Lexington, Kentucky and six Carl King Tire stores in Delaware and Maryland.

Monro entered three new states with acquisitions in 2014. It bought nine Lentz USA Automotive Service Centers and eight Ken Rock Tire stores in Michigan. It then acquired nine Wood & Fullerton stores in Atlanta, Georgia, and re-bannered them under the Mr. Tire name. Monro acquired 35 Tire Choice & Total Car Care stores in Florida, then continued into 2015 by buying the nine-store Gold Coast Tire & Auto Center and eight-store Martino Tire & Service Center chains. These stores were reopened under the Tire Choice banner. In May, Monro announced the acquisition of the Car-X brand, and would continue to operate all of its 146 locations, across 10 states, as a franchise. That summer, it also completed the acquisition of four Windsor Tire stores in Massachusetts and 27 Kost Tire and Auto Care stores in New York.

In 2016, Monro purchased Clark Tire & Auto Inc., which operated 26 stores in North Carolina. It also acquired 11 additional stores owned by six independent tire dealers from Georgia, Minnesota, Michigan, New Hampshire, and Florida. The company announced in June 2017 that Brett Ponton was named president and chief executive officer.

=== Monro, Inc. ===
In August 2017, the company announced it had changed its name from Monro Muffler Brake Inc. to Monro Inc. in order to better reflect its range of services. This change also coincided with Monro's 60th anniversary, the retirement of Gross, and its crossing of the $1 billion sales mark earlier that year. The company continued making purchases when it acquired 35 stores from 12 sellers between April 2017 and February 2018. Another 52 stores were acquired between April 2018 and February 2019.

Monro serviced 6.2 million vehicles in 2019 and posted record sales of $1.2 billion, record net income of $79 million, and earnings of $2.41 per share. The company also consolidated its retail brands, including service brands Monro and Car-X; tire brands Mr. Tire, Tire Choice, Tread Quarters, Ken Towery, and AutoTire; and tire and alignment brands Tire Warehouse Tires for Less and Tire Barn Warehouse.

In March 2019, Monro entered the California market with the acquisition of 40 Certified Tire and Service Center locations in San Francisco, San Diego, and Los Angeles. It also acquired Skip's Tire & Auto Repair Centers and Lloyd's Tire & Auto Care. In addition, the company acquired 20 stores in Louisiana, including Allied Discount Tire, Atlas Tire & Auto, Scotty's Tire & Auto, Twin Tire & Automotive, and T-Boys Tire and Auto, and the 14 Superior Tire stores in Nevada and Idaho, bringing Monro's store total to 1,288 in 32 states.

Ponton left the company in August 2020, resulting in chairman Robert Mellor taking over as interim CEO. Activist investor Ides Capital suggested that Monro's lack of diversity on its board and workforce was limiting the company's future growth. The company announced the acquisition of Mountain View Tire & Service, Inc. in March 2021, including 30 California-based stores. It also hired Michael Broderick as president and CEO. In May 2022, it sold the Tires Now distribution brand to American Tire Distributors for $105 million. At the time, Tires Now operated seven facilities across the southeast, servicing more than 3,500 wholesale customers.

In April 2025, the company replaced Broderick with Peter Fitzsimmons, who was given a mandate from the board of directors to execute a performance improvement plan for the company. On the same day, Monro was hit with a class action lawsuit over a data breach that had been first disclosed in March. After reporting a 4.9% decrease in sales, Monro announced in May 2025 that it will close 145 underperforming stores.
