= Aizpuru =

Aizpuru (also Aizpurúa and Aispurua) is a surname of Basque origin. Notable people with the surname include:

- Natalia Aispurúa (born 20 December 1991), Argentine volleyball player.
- Iñaki Aizpurua (born 1970), Spanish retired footballer who played as a goalkeeper.
- Juana de Aizpuru (born 1933), Spanish art gallerist.
- Julián Elorza Aizpuru (1879–1964), Spanish politician.
- Manuela Sáenz y Aizpuru (1797–1856), Ecuadorian revolutionary.
- Mertxe Aizpurua, Spanish journalist and politician.
- Oier Aizpurua (1977), Spanish sprint canoer who competed in the early 2000s.
- Pilar Gonzalbo Aizpuru (born 1935), Spanish academic.
- Mario Mendoza Aizpuru (born 26 December 1950)
