= Fundación Cerezales Antonino y Cinia =

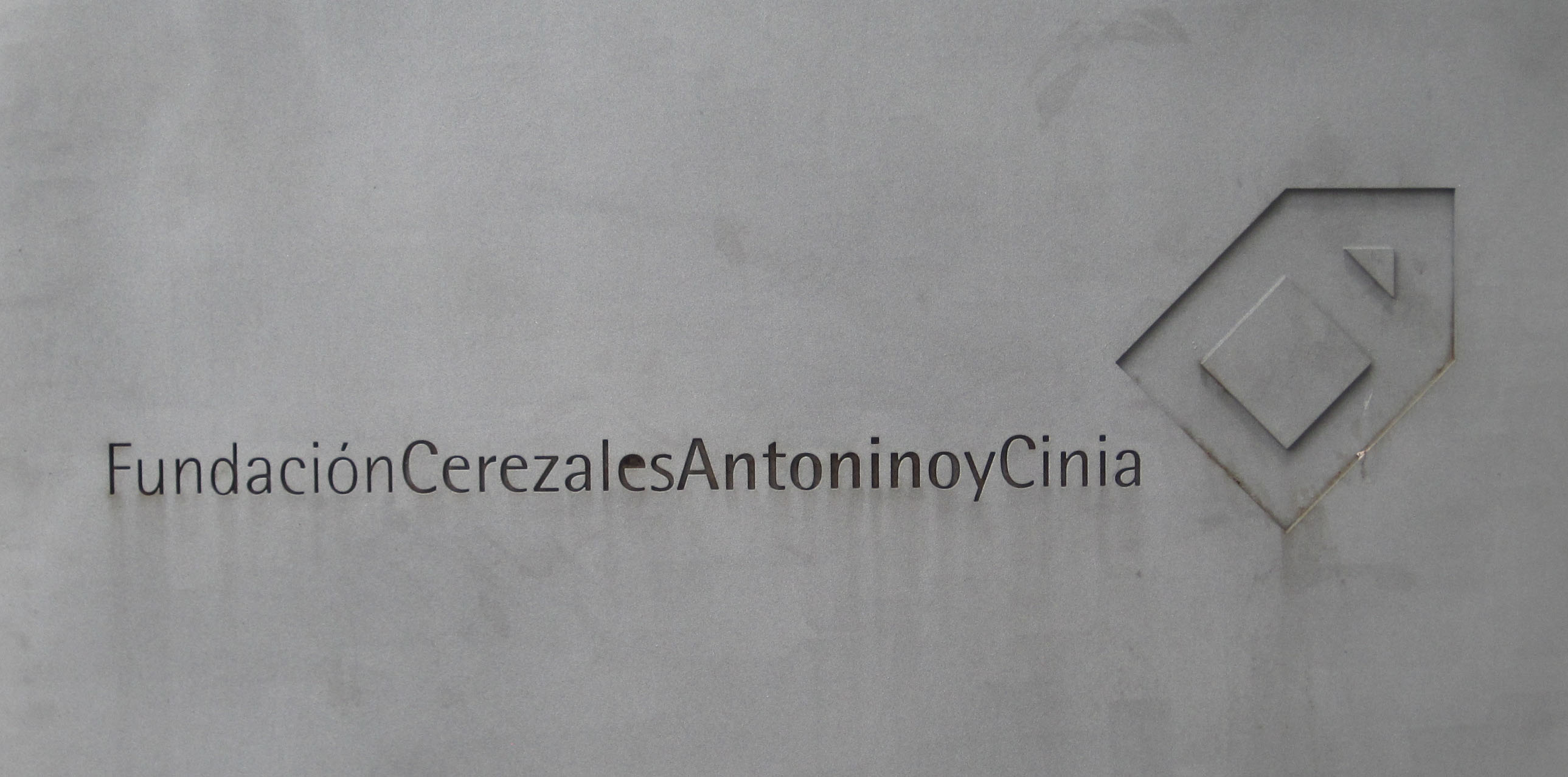
- Formation: November 8, 2008
- Founder: Antonino Fernández Rodríguez
- Headquarters: Cerezales del Condado, Spain; Antonino Fernández, 76, 24150
- Coordinates: 42°42′58″N 5°21′22″W
- Fields: Culture, transfer of knowledge and ethno-education
- Website: www.fundacioncerezalesantoninoycinia.org

The Fundación Cerezales Antonino y Cinia (Cerezales Antonino and Cinia Foundation or FCAYC) is a Spanish private institution located at Cerezales del Condado in the province of León. Founded in 2008 on the initiative of Antonino Fernández Rodríguez, who was born and raised there, the foundation focuses on the development of the territory and the transfer of knowledge through the production of culture and ethno-education. The disciplines around which it articulates its activities include music, art, the environment, sociology and the economy.

== History ==
In 1949, Antonino Fernández Rodríguez, who was born in Cerezales del Condado and emigrated to Mexico joined the Grupo Modelo, holding various positions in the company and being appointed CEO in 1971. He continued to run the brewery group until 1997, and was chairman of the board until 2005. In parallel with his business career, Antonino Fernández has been very active in philanthropic ventures, and in 2008 he founded the Fundación Cerezales Antonino y Cinia with the aim of facilitating access to culture in the place that was home to so many generations of his family.

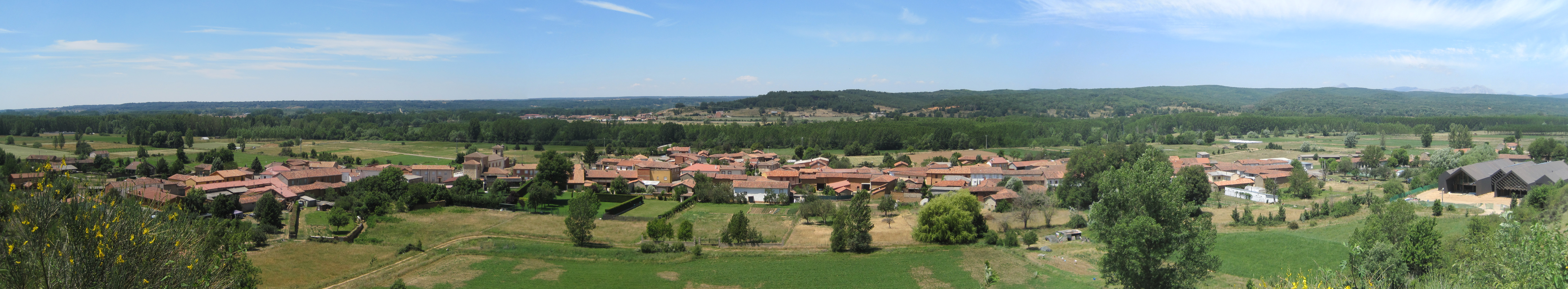
Panoramic view of Cerezales del Condado

Having established the foundation with an initial capital of 3.5 million euros, Antonino signed an agreement with the Neighbourhood Council of Cerezales del Condado to convert the old school buildings to house the foundation, as a venue for concerts, performances, workshops and a wide range of other activities. This was one of a number of initiatives that Antonino has undertaken in the area, including the rehabilitation of the church and improvements to local infrastructure.

== Mission ==
The core objectives of the Foundation are the promotion of the critical capacity and the transformative potential that every society possesses by actively facilitating access to culture and education. Addressed from the local context, these objectives are pursued by way of alternative approaches to revitalizing the Cerezales region and to alleviating—through education, culture, arts and crafts—rural depopulation and isolation and to integrating the discourses that affect rural life into the same line of action as the discourses on the contemporary. The forms of action for achieving these objectives include various programmes and seasons, always within the perspective of the continuity of the research work in the medium and long term, embodied in exhibitions, workshops and working groups, among others. The forms of action are:

- Ethno-education: Based on localization and support in the form of training, funding and the dissemination of projects related to the Foundation's geographical setting; activities and seasons of a socio-economic and environmental nature, and the fostering of research and innovation in sectors such as primary sector, sustainable tourism or new technologies and expert advice on and channelling of financial aid and subsidies.
- Contemporary art: The focus here is on researching, producing, disseminating and affording access to art and the work of contemporary artists. In addition to the enhancing its own collection and exhibiting this in the public space, the Foundation prepares, curates and hosts exhibitions of contemporary art, of note among which are those of work by Jan Hendrix, Cristina García Rodero and Chema Madoz, and Cabins for Thinking, which were subsequently shown in the Círculo de Bellas Artes, o Arqueologías del futuro, with works from Barcelona Museum of Contemporary Art and Museo Reina Sofía.
- Music: in view of its commitment to music as a means of heightening our appreciation of art and culture, the Foundation supports performers of a variety of musical styles and seeks to introduce their work to new audiences. Activities include music seasons, a jazz festival and workshops dedicated to sound and musical creation, among others.

== Headquarters ==
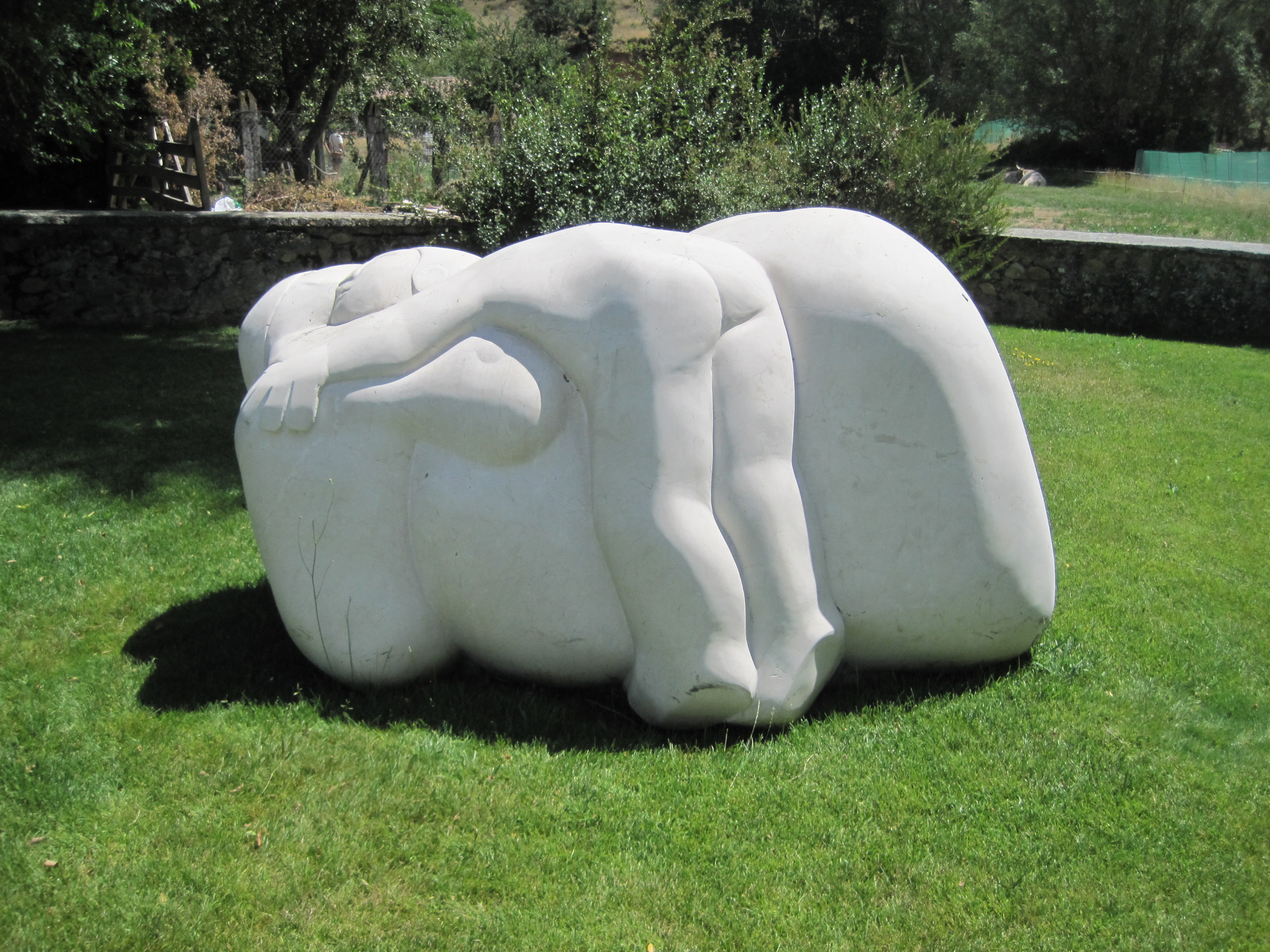
Maternity, by Castorina

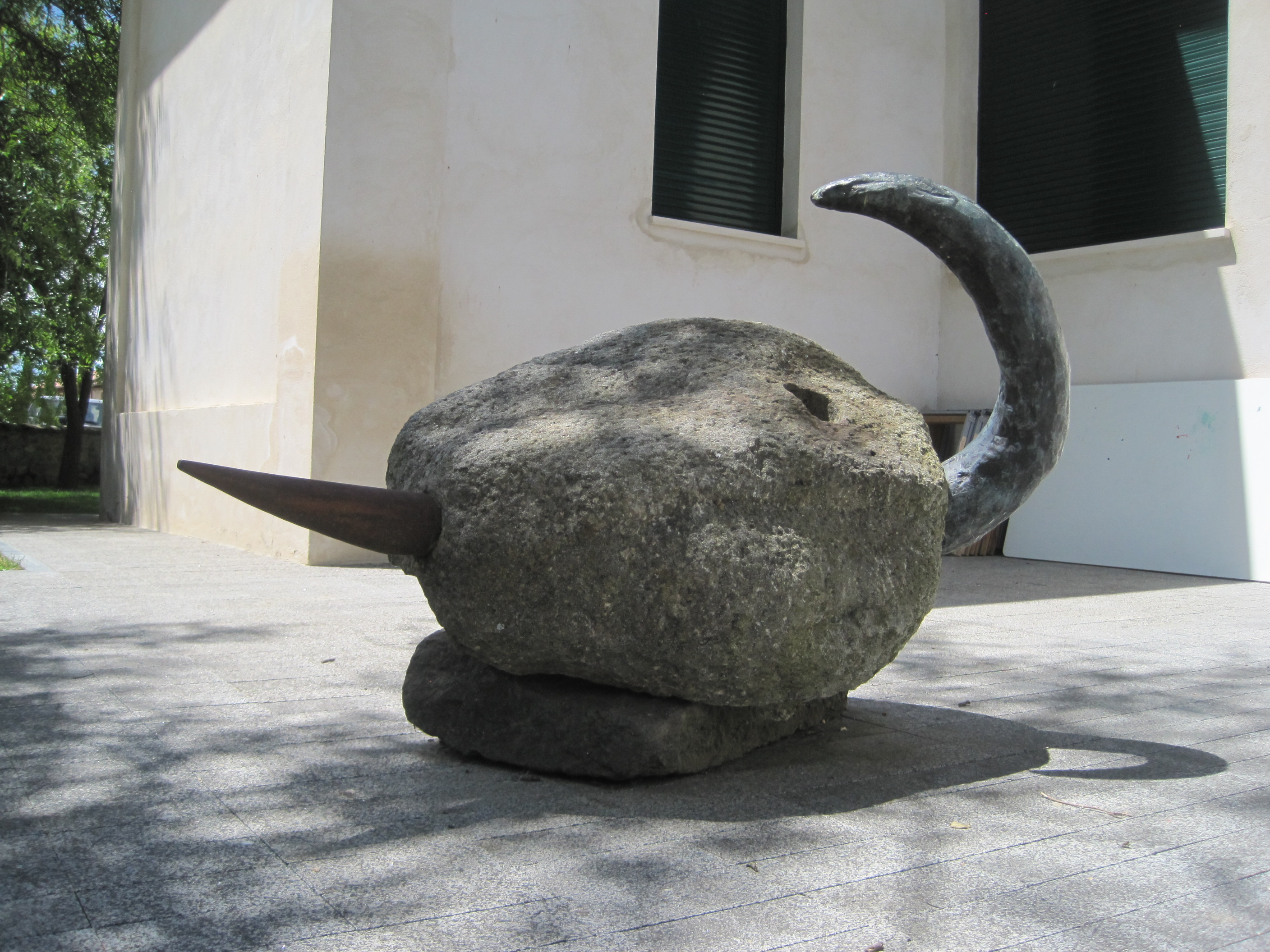
Large Goat, by Eduardo Arroyo

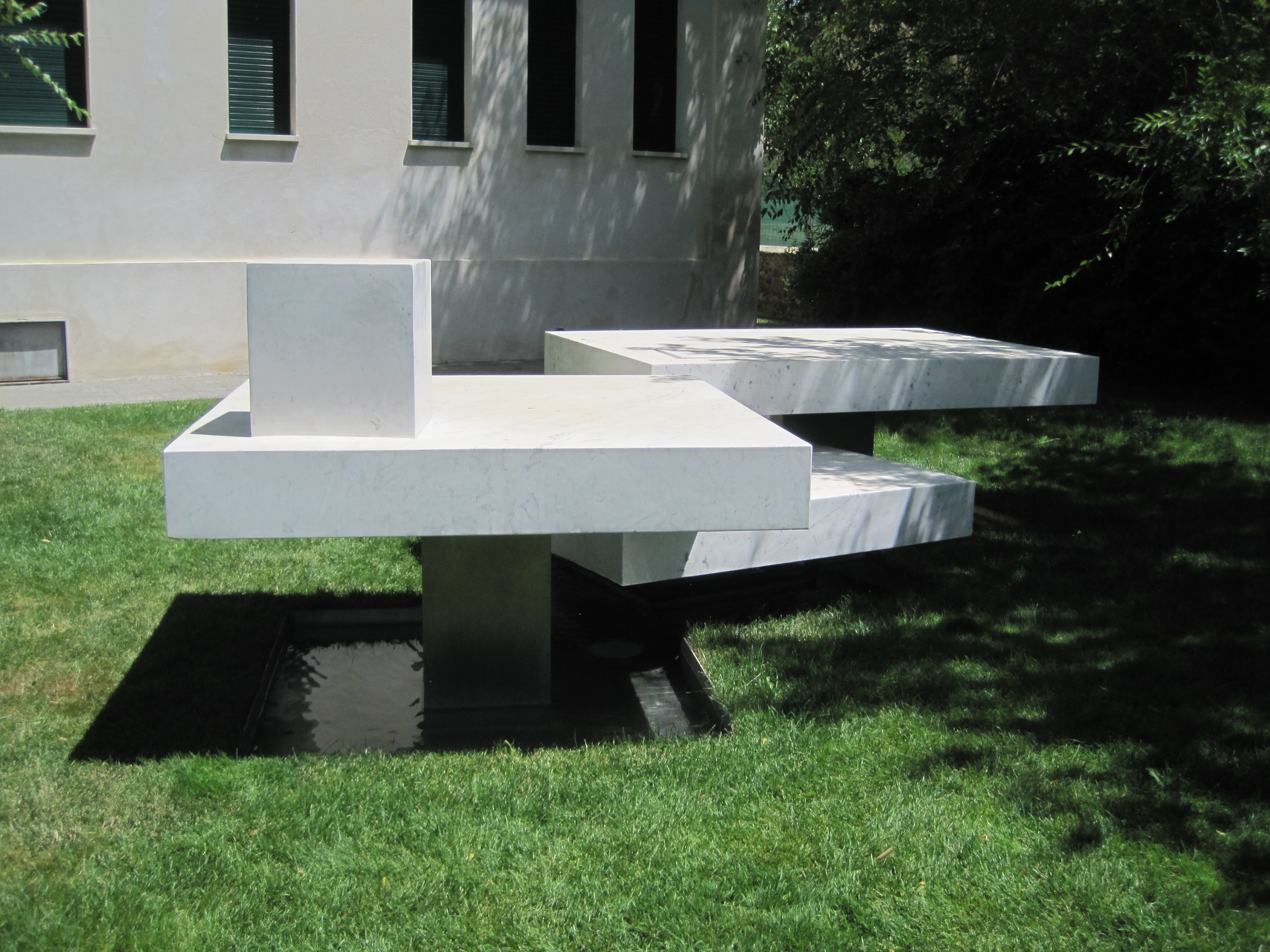
Whisper in Time, by Tadanori Yamaguchi

The Foundation is based in the old school buildings of Cerezales del Condado, constructed in 1931 and restored in 2009 with a major reorganization of the interior to accommodate activities of all kinds. The result is a multipurpose space whose design allows it to be used as an exhibition gallery, an auditorium with stage, a classroom and administration offices, depending on the arrangement of its partitions. In the landscaped area next to the building are three sculptures belonging to the foundation's collection of public art: Maternity by Castorina Fe Francisco, Whisper in Time by Tadanori Yamaguchi, and Large Goat by Eduardo Arroyo.

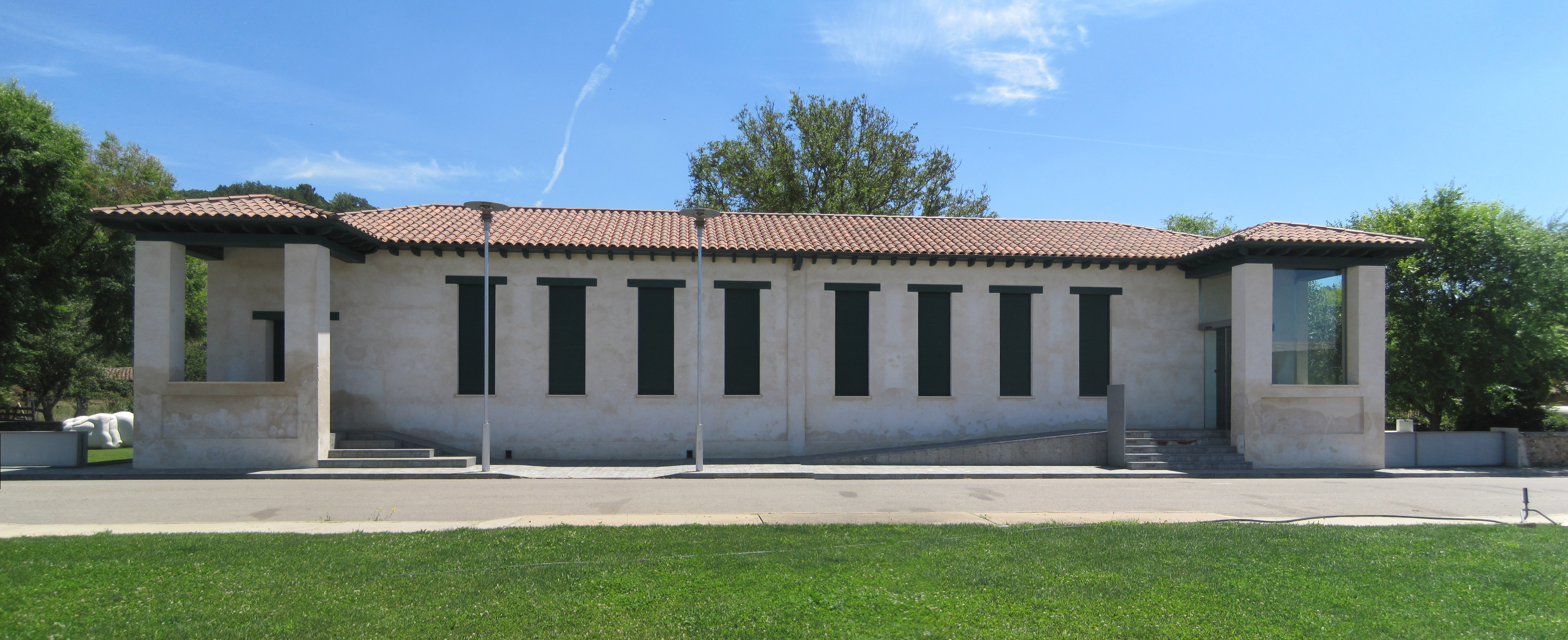
Facade of the headquarters

In view of the public response and the growing number and variety of activities, taking in areas such as music, the visual arts and education, the foundation saw the need to increase the capacity of its facilities. The fruit of this is a new building, designed by the architecture firm of Alejandro Zaera and Maider Llaguno and constructed between 2014 and 2016. This is a free-standing building of five bays under a pitched roof—an archetype of rural architecture—in the upper part of the Foundation's plot of land. The construction is predominantly of wood, with a structural frame and walls of larch from the Pyrenees, and was designed and built as a zero energy. It has an innovative energy programme based on three sources of renewable energy—geothermal, biomass and phase-change material—developed by the Atres80 engineering firm. The facilities include an exhibition space, an auditorium, classrooms and rehearsal rooms, a documentation centre, laboratories, a lobby for multiple activities and management offices. Construction of a small nature classroom on the adjacent plot is currently under way and due to be completed in 2016.

== Activity seasons ==
The development of the foundation's activities is articulated in various seasons of different durations:

- Encerezados: this project of cultural and educational activities takes place in summer, and includes the seasons Jazzfestival and ArtTítere.
- Musics and sounds: one of the key aims of the Foundation is to bring music to rural areas. With this in view, since 2009 the FCAYC has put on a bi-annual season of chamber music at Christmas and at Easter in the churches of the area. Since 2011 the programme has also included other styles such as pop, folk, rock and experimental music.
- JazzFestival: as part of the music programme, since 2009 the Foundation has staged a jazz festival in Cerezales town square during the months of July and August.
- Sendas/Paths: with a view to fostering respect for the territory, the FCAYC publicizes real projects being carried out in rural areas, understood as alternative ways of living.
- ArtTítere: This Festival of Puppet and Object Theatre takes place during the summer months.
- Mycological Mondays and Bird Monday: launched thanks to a collaboration agreement signed in 2012 with the Green Office unit at the University of León, the objective of these activities is the analysis of mycological and ornithological diversity in the area, with the setting up of working groups led by specialists whose activities are complemented by theoretical sessions and field trips.
- Orienteering: activities related to orienteering such as introductory courses and popular events are organized with knowledge of and respect for the natural landscape as their basis.
- En ruta/En route: every year the Foundation organizes a one- or two-day cultural excursion to a place of artistic or historical importance.
- Theatre: since 2011 the FCAYC has had a permanent theatre group, which regularly stages performances for residents and visitors.
- Collaboration with schools: with the aim of reinforcing teaching materials for Kindergartens and Primary and Secondary schools, the Foundation runs a programme of workshops covering artistic creation, music and knowledge of the environment.
- Collaboration with Asprona: with a view to developing the sensory and expressive skills people with intellectual disabilities, the Foundation runs a programme of workshops in collaboration with the Nuestra Señora del Camino centre in León.

== Projects ==
Some of the projects developed by the Foundation are:

- Archive Territory: this is an arts project whose remit is to conserve the memory of villages and their people in the form of photographs, Super 8 films, letters and other documents.
- Herbarium: the creation of a digital herbarium in partnership with local people combining both scientific and popular knowledge of the different plants.
- Hacendera Abierta: this is a mutually cooperative working community which mets regularly to carry out a research and development project centred on the collective sharing of knowledge.
- Personal Libraries Network: this working group is engaged in creating a network of personal libraries based on knowledge of the rural environment.

== Exhibitions ==
Of note among the exhibitions organized by the Foundation are:

- Eduardo Arroyo. Territorio íntimo/Intimate Territory.
- Chillida. Obra gráfica/Graphic Work.
- Bernardo Alonso Villarejo: En los límites de las sombras/At the Limits of the Shadows.
- Richard Serra. Peso y materia/Weight and Material.
- Luis Gordillo: Archipiélago/Archipelago.
- Cristina García Rodero: Combatiendo la nada/Combatting Nothing.
- Castorina. Autorretrato/Selfportrait.
- Jan Hendrix. El marco Natural/The Natural Frame.
- Chema Madoz.
- Archive Territory.
- Xavier Miserachs.
- Nelo Vinuesa & Bimotor: Replay.
- Luke Fowler: Sentido Común/Common Sense.
- Carlos Irijalba: Uncut.
- Cabañas para pensar/Cabins for Thinking.
- Arqueologías del futuro/Archaeologies of the Future.
- Alvaro Laiz. El Cazador/The Hunter.

== See also ==
- Antonino Fernández Rodríguez
- Grupo Modelo
