= Pablo Diez Fernandez =

Mexican businessperson (1884–1972)

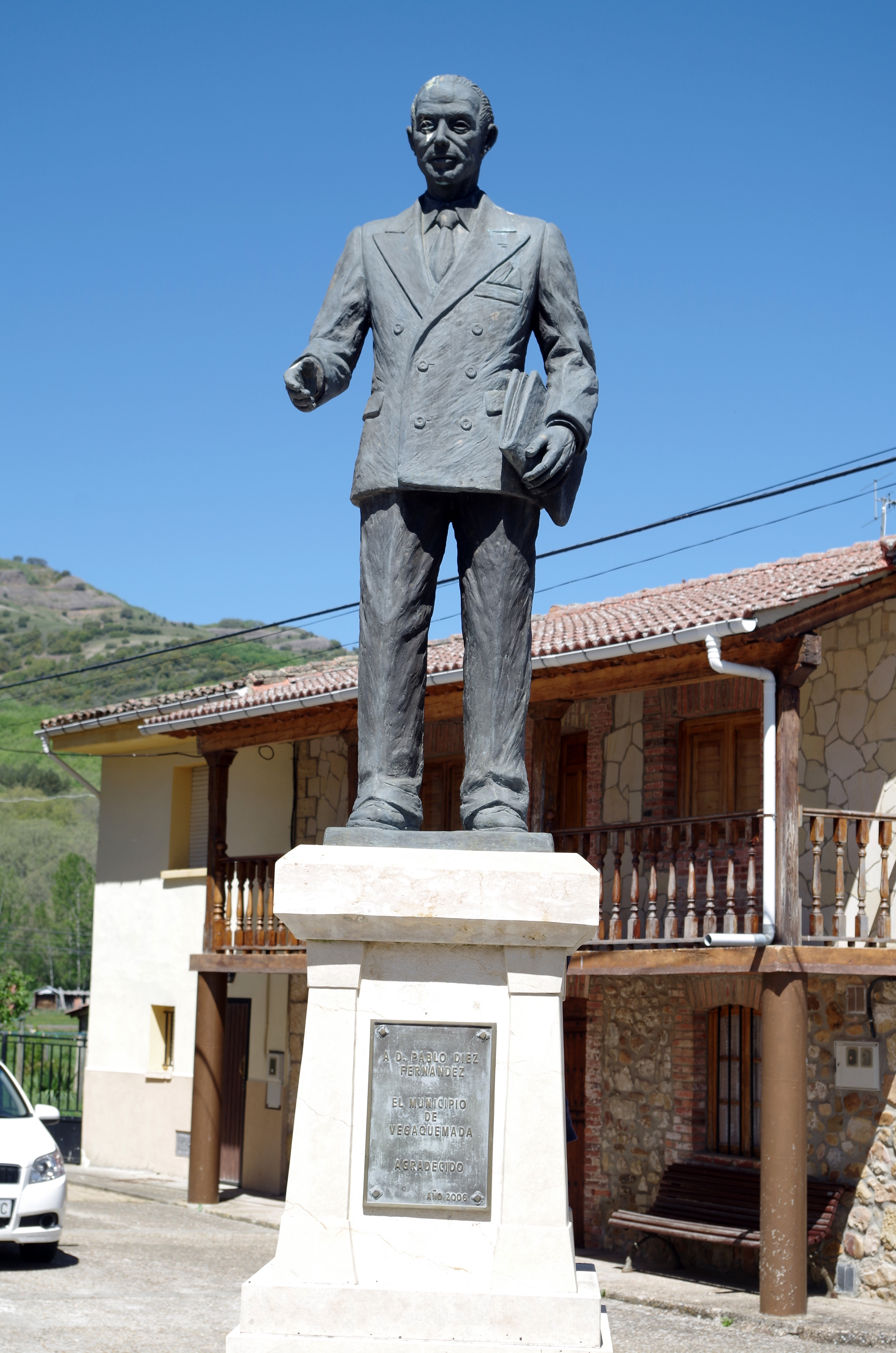
Pablo Díez Fernández monument in Vegaquemada, Spain.

Pablo Díez Fernández (1884–1972) was the son of Ceferino Díez and Gregoria Fernández, Pablo Díez was born in Vegaquemada, León, Spain, on June 29, 1884. After the death of his mother when he was only three years old, he was raised by his paternal grandparents in the town of Palazuelo de Boñar. He studied Classical Literature and Philosophy at the Instituto Municipal de Boñar, and when he turned 16 he joined the Dominican Monastery of Cangas de Narcea. Soon after his 20th birthday, when he was about to be ordained, Pablo Díez decided that the priesthood was not his true calling in life and moved to Madrid. In 1905, with the help he got from the Dominican Friars themselves, he sailed out to Mexico.

Once in Mexico, he took on a job as book keeper at the Venegas bakery. In 1911 he became the manager of another bakery called La Primavera. As a result of his hard work, he was able to save enough money to first partner with and then, in 1912, buy that business from its previous owners. The following year, Díez Fernández became one of the founding shareholders of Leviatán y Flor, a company which has been recognized as the first compressed yeast factory in Mexico.

In 1918, he married Rosario Guerrero Herrero, whom he had met during one of his many visits to Spain.

Four years later he became part of the community of distinguished businessmen, industry experts, and bankers that would put up the capital to start the business which was later to become Grupo Modelo: Cervecería Modelo. A shareholder since the very beginning and member of its board of directors since 1926, the businessman from the region of León in Spain continued to care for his bread and yeast production businesses while also promoting other new adventures. One of them, Pan Ideal, is famous for having been the first mechanical bread producing plant in Mexico.

In 1928, Pablo Díez was appointed to the Board of Directors of Crédito Español de México, SA and of other important businesses of the Spanish community in Mexico. That same year, Braulio Iriarte entrusted him with the responsibility of being the legal representative of Cervecería Modelo. He was 44 years old at the time.

Díez Fernández founded seminars, sanctuaries, and hospitals in his country of origin, for which he was highly recognized. The latter is also true for Mexico, where his philanthropic work left a profound mark on the development of nursing homes and hospitals. Among them the most recognized are the Sanatorio Español, the Red Cross's central hospital in Mexico City and the Instituto Nacional de Cancerología; he made important donations to help build all these institutions.

In 1955, don Pablo Díez crowned the Virgin of Guadalupe as the Queen of Work, sharing in the devotion shown for the Virgin by the workers in the largest of his companies: Cervecería Modelo.

In recognition of this philanthropic work and his entrepreneurial accomplishments, in 1969 Don Pablo Díez received the highest honor granted by the Mexican government: the Orden del Águila Azteca.

He was also a relevant shareholder in other companies in Mexico including IEM, Condumex, Fundidora Monterrey, Celanese Mexicana and Banco Nacional de México, and he served as the first vice-president for this bank. In Spain, Cervecería Cruz Campo and Banco Central Hispano held his most relevant investments.

Just before he retired from public life, although he remained as Honorary Chairman of Grupo Modelo, Díez Fernández turned over the business to the people close to him who had managed it for several years. The main shareholders of the new company that controlled Cervecería Modelo, a company whose sales in 1970 were estimated somewhere between 850 and 900 million pesos, were Juan Sánchez Navarro, Manuel Álvarez Loyo, Nemesio Díez, Secundino García, Antonino Fernández, Pablo Aramburuzabala and other employees of the brewery which would later on become Grupo Modelo, the seventh largest beer group in the world, when it was headed first by Don Antonino Fernández and, then, by Carlos Fernández González.

Don Pablo Díez Fernández died on November 17, 1972, in Mexico City.
