= Antonino Fernández Rodríguez =

Antonino Fernández Rodríguez (13 December 1917 – 31 August 2016) was a Spanish businessman, founder and former chairman of Grupo Modelo.

== Early life ==
Fernández was born in Cerezales del Condado, in the province of León, Spain. He was the eleventh of a family made up of 13 children, and he was married for almost sixty years to Cinia González Díez.

== Career ==
Fernández moved to Mexico in 1949, accompanied by his wife. He immediately started working at Cervecería Modelo under the wing of his wife's uncle, the Spanish-born Don Pablo Díez, founder of Grupo Modelo. During his first months in Mexico, he carried out different jobs at the brewery until he was promoted to the post of general manager, from where he learned the work of the Company. He was in charge, for example, of preparing and training young Mexican engineers, whom he recruited from universities in the country, to transform them into the company's brewers, substituting the original German brewers who had been in charge of producing beer up until then.

He made investments in new equipment and machinery and worked to improve product quality. In 1958, Fernández was in charge of coordinating the construction of Cervecería Modelo de Guadalajara which was built by the brew masters he had trained. The facility in Guadalajara was the third Grupo Modelo brewery, adding on to those in Mexico City and Mazatlán, and it was followed by the construction and/or acquisition of another four, culminating in the construction of the Zacatecas brewery, which is currently the largest brewery in Latin America and the second largest in the world.

In 1971, Fernández was appointed Chairman of the Board of Directors and Chief Executive Officer of Grupo Modelo. He maintained his position as CEO until 1997 and as Chairman of the Board until 2005, roles that were taken over by his nephew Carlos Fernández González. He remained as the Honorary Life Chairman of Grupo Modelo until his death.

He created several companies, including Nueva Fábrica Nacional de Vidrio, Cebadas y Maltas, Inamex de Cerveza y Malta, Compañía Cervecera del Trópico and Industria Vidriera del Potosí.

== Philanthropic work ==
Along with his work in Grupo Modelo, Fernández established in his home province of León the company known as Soltra, which gives jobs to people with disabilities, and which has been replicated in Mexico, in the state of Puebla, in a company that carries the name of his wife: Cinia. He also founded the Fundación Cerezales Antonino y Cinia in his native town.

== Awards and recognition ==
Fernández was recognized with several medals of Honor and for excellence in military service, as well as the recognition of the Order of Isabella the Catholic, granted to him by King Juan Carlos I of Spain. He was also named distinguished visitor and received insignias from several cities in Mexico and the rest of the world, the Medal of Honor granted by the Casino Español and the Tlamatini Award granted by the Universidad Iberoamericana.
