= Anna Turbau =

Spanish photojournalist (1949–2025)

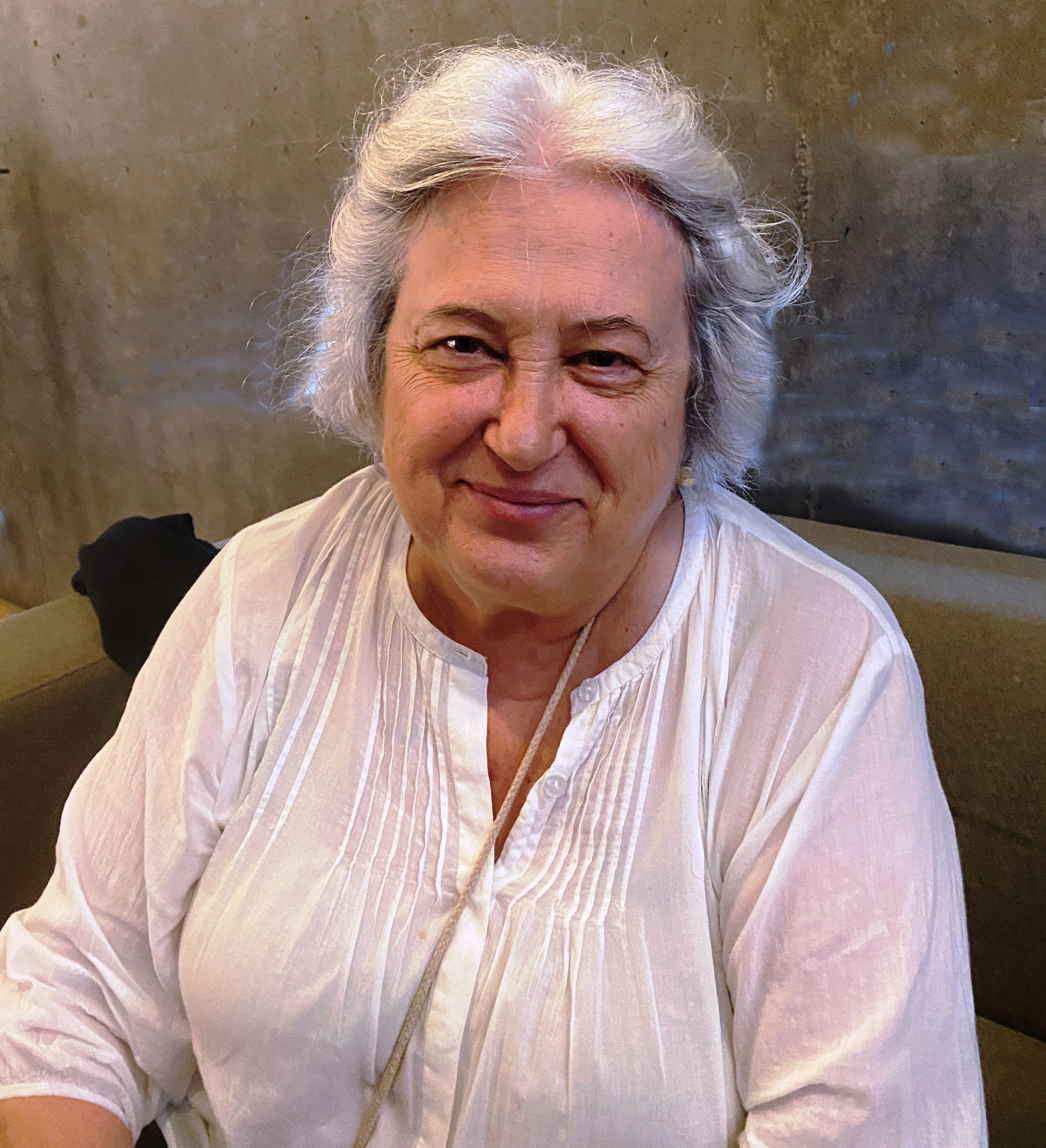
- Turbau in 2023
- Born: 27 March 1949; Barcelona, Spain
- Died: 19 March 2025 (aged 75)
- Occupation: Photojournalist
- Known for: Documentary photography, photojournalism during the Spanish Transition

Anna Turbau (27 March 1949 – 19 March 2025) was a Spanish photojournalist associated with the counterculture and realist photography, who also worked on documentary projects. Her photographic work in Galicia between 1975 and 1979 is particularly significant, generating great interest in the Spanish art scene. Some of her photographs have been acquired by prestigious institutions such as the Reina Sofía National Art Museum. Her photographic style, often using black and white with symbolic intent and wide-angle lenses to achieve highly expressionist optical effects, has been linked to other photojournalists such as Pilar Aymerich and Manel Armengol. Among her influences, Turbau highlighted photographers such as Cristina García Rodero, Koldo Chamorro, Robert Doisneau, and Robert Frank.

== Life and work ==
Although initially interested in sculpture, Turbau studied graphic design at the Escola Massana (Centre d'Art i Disseny) and later at the Escola Elisava (Escola Universitària de Disseny i Enginyeria de Barcelona). During her studies, she was invited to cover an occupation (okupación) of an apartment in Barcelona for the magazine Interviú, which led her to discover her passion for photography and, specifically, for photojournalism. From that moment, she definitively distanced herself from design. According to her, photography allowed her to "show everything that the dictatorship did not want to see."

After photographing Ciutat Vella (Old City) in Barcelona in 1975, focusing on making poverty and marginalization in El Raval visible, she moved to Galicia that summer to continue documenting marginalized communities. Invited by the Colexio de Arquitectos de Galicia (Galician College of Architects), her initial intention was to document the housing project designed by César Portela and Pascuala Campos de Michelena in the O Vao settlement (Pontevedra), built to house Roma families. However, she ended up staying in Galicia for four years, settling in Santiago de Compostela in 1976 and working as a correspondent for magazines like Interviú and Primera Plana. This made her a witness to the new trade union and protest movements emerging in that era of deep political, social, and economic change during the Spanish Transition. Her archive of nearly ten thousand negatives documents protests in favour of the Galician autonomy statute, opposition to the construction of the AP-9 highway, the tragedy of the Marbel shipwreck, and the first edition of the Ortigueira Festival. Her work captures the reality of small, forgotten villages, their architecture, their people, and especially the role of women in rural Galician society.

During this period, she also gained access to the Conxo Psychiatric Hospital in Santiago de Compostela, where she documented the harsh conditions of the patients. However, the report was not exhibited for almost four decades due to the shocking nature of the images and fear of repercussions. Police pressure eventually forced her to leave Galicia, and she returned to Barcelona in 1979, where she faced difficulties continuing as a photojournalist.

In the following years, she worked for the magazine Actual but had to interrupt her collaboration due to being a single mother. Later, she joined the TV station TV3, where she worked for 12 years as an assistant director, specializing in educational and cultural programming and becoming an active member of the workers' committee. She also taught photojournalism at the International School of Photography Grisart in Barcelona. During this period, she divided her time between Calatañazor (Soria) and Barcelona, continuing her photographic work with projects such as Mujer y Silencio (Women and Silence, 2009) and documenting the exhumation of war victims in Calatañazor (2017), in collaboration with her husband, the Valencian documentary filmmaker Llorenç Soler.

In 2017, the anthology Anna Turbau. Galicia, 1975-1979 was published by the Consello da Cultura Galega, accompanying an exhibition of the same name.

Turbau died on 19 March 2025, at the age of 75.

== Individual exhibitions ==
- Galiza. Galería Sargadelos, Santiago de Compostela, 1979.
- Jazz for Five Instruments. Granollers, 1987.
- Galicia, the Transition Years 70s. Centre Cívic Golferichs, Barcelona, 2012.
- The Intimacy of the Image. Santiago de Compostela, 2017.

== Collective exhibitions ==
- Gypsies in the World. Madrid, 1979.
- Five Years of Press Photography in Spain: 1975-1980. 1980.
- PhotoPres 83. La Caixa, Barcelona / Madrid, 1983.
- Tan Lejos, Tan Cerca (So Far, So Close). Madrid, 2014.
