= Juana de Aizpuru =

Spanish art collector (born 1933)

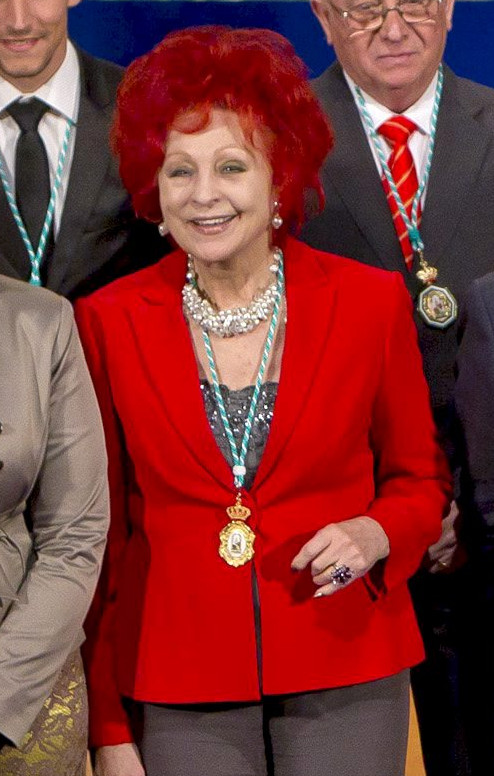
- Born: Juana Dominguez; 1933 (age 91–92); Valladolid, Spain
- Known for: International gallerist and collector

Juana Domínguez known as Juana de Aizpuru (born August 22, 1933) is a Spanish art gallerist, a pioneer of contemporary art collecting in Spain.

== Biography ==
She was born in Valladolid and moved in her childhood to live in Madrid. In 1955, she married Juan Aizpuru, moving to live in Seville, where in 1970, she opened the Juana de Aizpuru gallery. Between 1977 and 1983, she carried out a work of help and patronage to young Andalusian artists, creating the "Juana de Aizpuru Scholarship".

In 1979, she proposed to IFEMA to make an Art Fair whose first edition was held in 1982 and it was named ARCO, the International Contemporary Art Fair of Madrid, being its director until 1986, after her resignation, she was relieved by Rosina Gómez Baeza. In 1983 she opened her gallery in Madrid and in 1991 she was elected president of the Spanish Association of Contemporary Art Galleries and member of the Board of Directors of the Spanish Federation of Art Galleries.

In 1997, she was awarded the Gold Medal for Merit in the Fine Arts. Distinguished by France as Knight of the Order of Arts and Letters.

In 2003, she created the International Contemporary Art Biennial of Seville (BIACS), being its first director. In 2011, she was named the favorite daughter of Andalusia, standing out in her appointment. "Her pioneering and non-conformist work broke innumerable molds in the Spain of the time, loading the palettes of new colors and impossible shapes, drawing a reality pregnant with freedom and hope on the gray canvases of those fuzzy years ".

She is a fundamental reference in the development of Spanish Contemporary Art. She works with national and international artists such as the National Photography and Fine Arts Prize awarded by the Spanish Ministry of Culture: Cristina Garcia Rodero, Cristina de Middel, Elena Asins, Alberto Garcia Alix as well as Cristina Lucas, Priscilla Monge, Montserrat Soto, Tania Bruguera, Pedro Cabrita Reis, Alicia Framis, Jordi Colomer, Pierre Gonnord, Joseph Kosuth, Andres Serrano, Philipp Fröhlich, Georg Dokoupil with their artists participate in the most prestigious national and international art fairs, among many others Frieze London and New York, Art Basel Switzerland, Miami etc.
