= María Asunción Aramburuzabala =

Mexican billionaire businesswoman (born 1963)

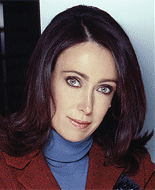
- Aramburuzabala in 2008
- Born: 2 May 1963 (age 63); Mexico City, Mexico
- Education: Instituto Tecnológico Autónomo de México
- Spouses: Paulo Patricio Zapata Navarro (m. 1982; div. 1997) Tony Garza (m. 2005; div. 2010)
- Children: 2

María Asunción Aramburuzabala Larregui (born 2 May 1963) is a Mexican billionaire businesswoman. She is the chairperson of Tresalia Capital, a venture capital firm. As of January 2026, her net worth is estimated at US$9.1 billion.

== Early life ==
María Asunción Aramburuzabala Larregui was born on 2 May 1963 in Mexico City, Mexico to Pablo Aramburuzabala Ocaranza, a Spanish Basque brewer in Mexico, and Lucrecia Larregui González, a Mexican painter whose father, José Larregui Iriarte, was a Navarrese miller in Mexico. She is the granddaughter of Félix Aramburuzabala Lazcano-Iturburu, a Spanish Basque immigrant who co-founded the Mexican brewery Grupo Modelo in 1925 with his friend and partner Pablo Díez Fernández. Her father was the Executive Vice President of the Grupo Modelo brewery.

Aramburuzabala graduated from the Instituto Tecnológico Autónomo de México where she majored in accounting.

== Family business ==
The Mexican brewery, Cervecería Modelo, was founded in 1925 by a group of businessmen, including don Pablo Díez Fernández – who became the company's president, CEO and major stockholder – and Felix Aramburuzabala. Felix's son, Pablo Aramburuzabala, the executive vice president of the brewery, died unexpectedly in 1995 of lung cancer at the age of 63. After his death, several groups tried to gain control of his family's share in Modelo – his wife and two daughters bonded together against these groups.

== Sports Venture ==
Aramburuzabala and her family were part of the investment group led by Neeru Khosla and her family in the purchase of the Seattle Seahawks of the National Football League (NFL). Upon the sale of the team being finalized on September 3, 2026, Aramburuzabala became a minority owner of the team.

== Wealth ==
As of January 2026 she had a net worth estimated at $9.1 billion.

In October 2021, she was found to be implicated in the Pandora Papers, which uncovered the offshore hidden wealth of many around the world, in a similar manner as the Panama Papers. According to the Pandora Papers, Aramburuzabala acquired two private jets and transferred at least $40 million through a trust fund located in New Zealand, Sky Chariot Trust.

== Personal life ==
In 1982, she married Paulo Patricio Zapata Navarro. They had two children, and they divorced in 1997.

On 26 February 2005, she married Tony Garza, U.S. ambassador to Mexico, in a small religious ceremony in Mexico City. On 23 April, they had the civil ceremony near Valle de Bravo, west of Mexico City. U.S. First Lady Laura Bush attended. An estimated one-third of the guests were from Texas. The couple divorced in May 2010.

== Awards and honors ==
- First woman to be inducted into the prestigious IAOP (International Association of Outsourcing Providers)
- 2004, Golden Plate Award of the American Academy of Achievement, presented by Awards Council member Carlos Slim
- 2007, Fortune Magazine's “50 most powerful women in global business”
- 2009, San Antonio Woman of Achievement
- 2014, Named One of Mexico's Most Powerful Women by Forbes
- 2016, Premio a la Excelencia Empresarial (Business Excellence Award) by Forbes México
