= Philipp Fröhlich =

German painter

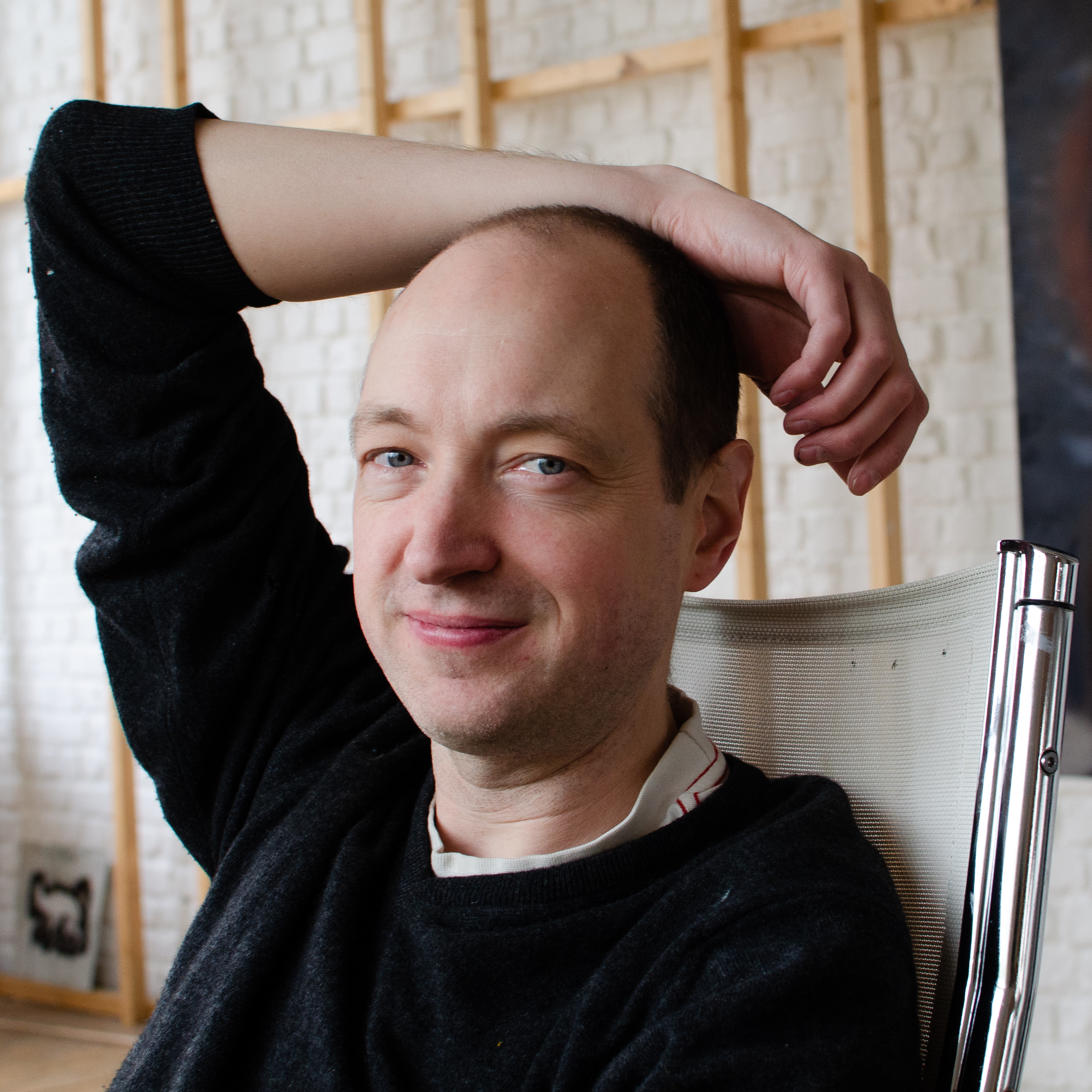
- Frohlich in his studio
- Born: 1975 (age 50–51); Schweinfurt, West Germany
- Education: Staatliche Kunstakademie Düsseldorf
- Website: philippfrohlich.com

Philipp Fröhlich (born 1975) is a German painter who lives and works in Brussels. His figurative paintings are influenced by his studies of scenography in the class of Professor Karl Kneidl at Kunstakademie Düsseldorf and he frequently uses models for the composition of his works.

== Exhibitions ==
=== Solo exhibitions ===
- "Hänsel und Gretel", Galería Juana de Aizpuru, Madrid.
- "Hoap of a Tree", Galería Juana de Aizpuru, Madrid.
- "Remote viewing", Galería Soledad Lorenzo, Madrid.
- "Scare the night away", Galería Soledad Lorenzo, Madrid.
- "Beachy head", Galería Soledad Lorenzo, Madrid.
- "Exvoto. Where is Nikki Black", Laboratorio987, MUSAC, León.

=== Group exhibitions (selection) ===
- "Cuestiones Personales", Colección Soledad Lorenzo, Museo Nacional Centro de Arte Reina Sofía, Madrid.
- "Something old, Something new", Von der Heydt- Museum Wuppertal, Germany.
- "De la Habana ha venido un...", Galería Juana de Aizpuru, Madrid.
- "Imbalance", Laznia Centre for Contemporary Art, Gdansk, Poland.
- "Iconografías 2.0" Museo Patio Herreriano, Valladolid.
- "Una mirada a lo desconocido", DA2, Salamanca.
- "Fiction and Reality", Moscow Museum of Modern Art, Moscow.
- "Declaración de ruina", Fundación Cerezales Antonino y Cinia, Cerezales del Condado, León.
- "Colección II", Centro de Arte Dos de Mayo, Madrid.
- "Existencias", MUSAC, León.
- "Una posibilidad de escape", Colección Musac, Espai d’art contemporani, Castellón.
- "2014 Antes de Irse", MACUF, A Coruña.

== Collections (selection) ==
Fröhlich's work is held in the following public collections:

- Museo Nacional Centro de Arte Reina Sofía in Madrid
- MUSAC in León,
- Museo Patio Herreriano in Valladolid
- Von der Heydt Museum in Wuppertal.
- Centro de Arte Dos de Mayo (Ca2M) in Mostoles.
- Museo Domus Artium (DA2) in Salamanca
