= Tony Garza =

American lawyer (born 1959)

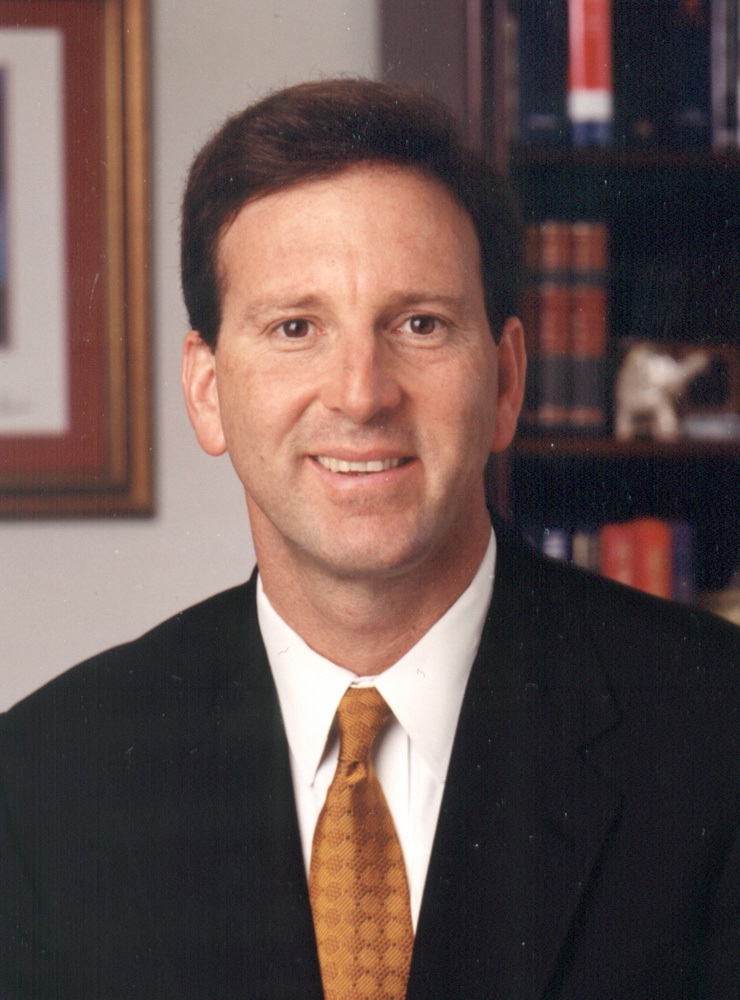

United States Ambassador to Mexico
- In office November 22, 2002 – January 20, 2009
- President: George W. Bush
- Preceded by: Jeffrey Davidow
- Succeeded by: Carlos Pascual

Railroad Commissioner of Texas
- In office January 4, 1999 – November 18, 2002
- Governor: George W. Bush; Rick Perry
- Preceded by: Barry Williamson
- Succeeded by: Victor Carrillo

98th Secretary of State of Texas
- In office January 17, 1995 – December 31, 1997
- Governor: George W. Bush
- Preceded by: Ron Kirk
- Succeeded by: Alberto Gonzales

Personal details
- Born: Antonio Oscar Garza Jr. July 7, 1959 (age 67) Brownsville, Texas, U.S.
- Party: Republican
- Spouse(s): María Asunción Aramburuzabala (m. 2005; div. 2010) Liz Beightler (m. 2012)
- Education: University of Texas at Austin (BA); Southern Methodist University (JD)

Antonio Oscar "Tony" Garza Jr. (born July 7, 1959) is an American lawyer and diplomat who was the United States Ambassador to Mexico from 2002 to 2009 under President George W. Bush. In recognition of his work, Mexico bestowed on him the Águila Azteca, the highest award granted to foreigners, in 2009. Prior to his appointment as ambassador, Garza had served as Secretary of State of Texas from January 1995 to November 1997 and was also chairman of the Texas Railroad Commission.

== Early life and education ==
Garza was born in Brownsville, Texas, the son of a gasoline station owner and the grandson of Mexican immigrants to the United States. Garza received his Bachelor of Business Administration from the University of Texas at Austin in 1980 and received his J.D. in 1983 from Southern Methodist University School of Law.

== Career ==
After practicing as an attorney, Garza became a judge in Cameron County in 1988. He served as the Texas Secretary of State from January 1995 to November 1997 before later being elected as one of the three member board of the Texas Railroad Commission, where he served as chairman.

In 2002, he was appointed U.S. Ambassador to Mexico, a position he held until 2009. In 2009, the year he retired from the office, Garza received the Águila Azteca from Mexico in recognition of his work to strengthen the bonds between Mexico and the United States. This is the highest award that Mexico bestows on foreigners. Thereafter, he took a position as counsel with White & Case LLP and also as chairman of management consultancy firm Vianovo Ventures.

== Personal life ==
Garza married María Asunción Aramburuzabala, the president of Tresalia Capital who had a personal fortune valued at $1.8 billion, according to one source. The couple divorced in May 2010. He subsequently married Dr Liz Beightler.

Political offices
Preceded by Ron Kirk	Secretary of State of Texas; 1995–1997	Succeeded by Alberto Gonzales
Diplomatic posts
Preceded by Jeffrey Davidow	United States Ambassador to Mexico; 2002–2009	Succeeded by Carlos Pascual
