= Alvaro Laiz =

Spanish photography

- Born: 1981 (age 44–45); León, Spain
- Known for: photography
- Movement: photojournalism, documentary photography

Alvaro Laiz (born 1981, León, Spain) is a Spanish photographer, specializing in the field of anthropology and environmental photojournalism.

== Biography ==
Alvaro Laiz was born in 1981 in Spain. He graduated with Master of Visual Arts from Pontifical University of Salamanca. Laiz specializes in anthropological and environmental photography, mostly in post conflict zones of the world. Among Laiz's projects are photographing the transgender community in Mongolia. He worked with indigenous people in Orinoco and the Venezuelan jungles. His works have been published by the British Journal of Photography, The Diplomat, and Wired.

=== ANHUA ===
Alvaro Laiz is also co-founder of ANHUA agency, an organisation of artists, documenting historical and contemporary culture.

== Exhibitions ==
Alvaro Laiz exhibited in galleries and museums in Spain and around the world, including solo exhibitions in Mining Museum of Sabero, Museo de Arte Contemporáneo de Castilla y León, Val-de-Marne Contemporary Art Museum.

== Awards ==
Alvaro Laiz was awarded FotoVisura Grant for Outstanding Personal Project in 2015 for his "The Hunt" project in which he photographed Udege people from Russian Far East. He received a golden medal at China International Photographic Art Exhibition in 2013.
