= Vegaquemada =

Coordinates: 42°49′N 5°21′W

- municipality
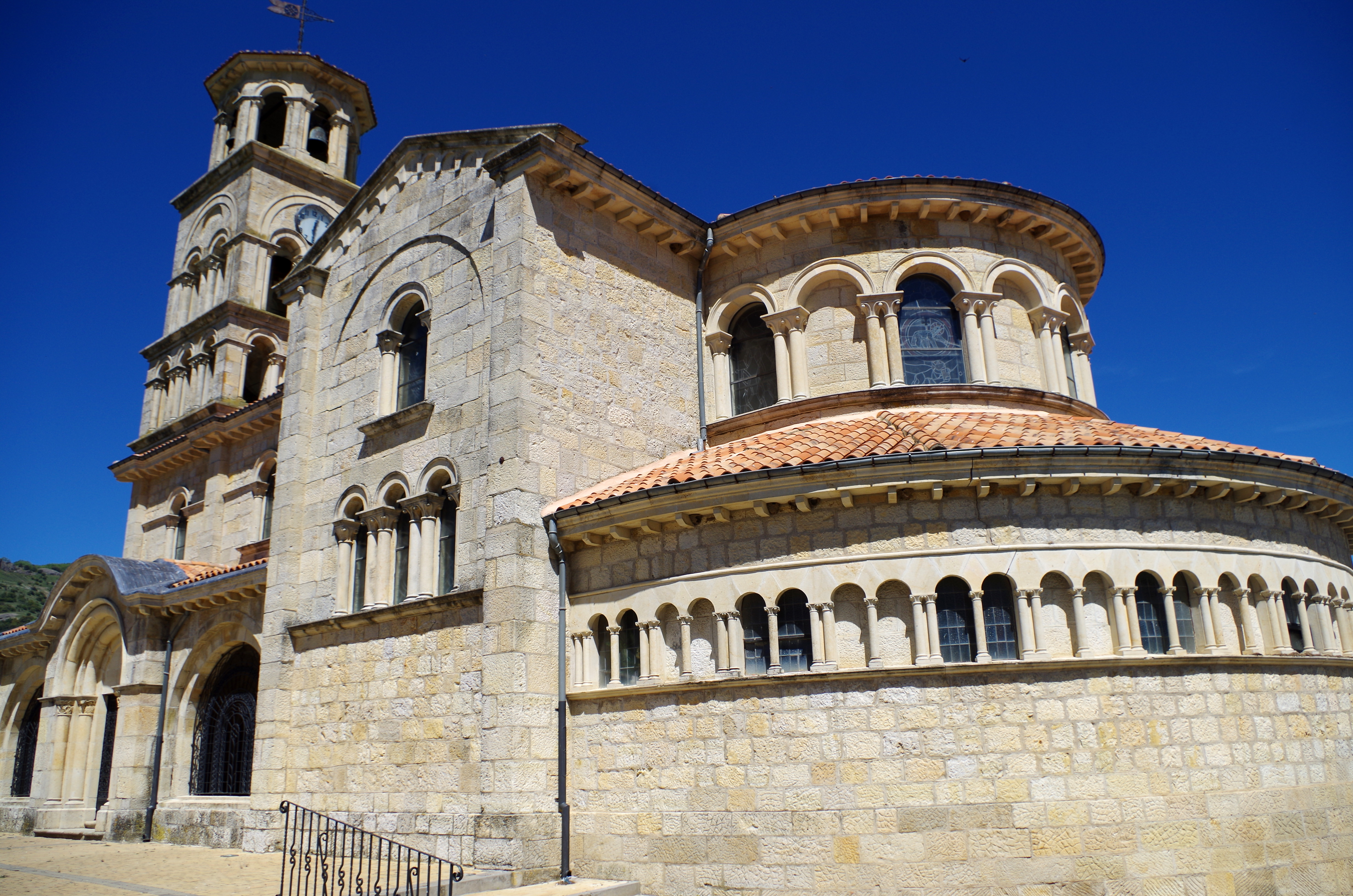
- Saint Thyrsus Parish Church

- Flag Coat of arms
- Interactive map of Vegaquemada
- Country: Spain
- Autonomous community: Castile and León
- Province: León
- Municipality: Vegaquemada

Area
  - Total: 72 km^{2} (28 sq mi)

Population (2025-01-01)
  - Total: 418
  - Density: 5.8/km^{2} (15/sq mi)
- Time zone: UTC+1 (CET)
  - Summer (DST): UTC+2 (CEST)

Vegaquemada is a municipality located in the province of León, Castile and León, Spain. According to the 2004 census (INE), the municipality has a population of 488 inhabitants.

== See also ==
- Kingdom of León
- Leonese language
- Province of Llión
- Llión
