= Julián Elorza Aizpuru =

Spanish Carlist politician

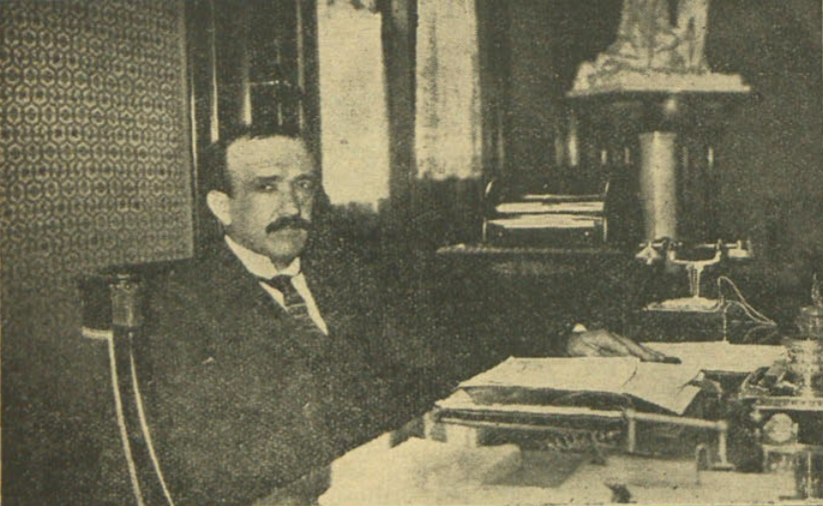
- Born: Julián Elorza Aizpuru; 1879; Azpeitia, Spain
- Died: 1964 (aged 84–85); San Sebastián, Spain
- Occupation: lawyer
- Known for: politician, official, Basque activist
- Political party: Carlism

Julián Elorza Aizpuru (1879-1964) was a Spanish Carlist politician. He is best known as advocate of Basque autonomous establishments, promoted during the Restoration, the Primo de Rivera dictatorship and the Second Republic. He was member of the provincial Gipuzkoan self-government (1911-1926, 1930–1931) and served as its president (1919-1924). Elorza was also the founder and the first president of Sociedad de Estudios Vascos (1919-1936). Politically he refrained from Carlist militancy and remained on conciliatory terms with most other political groupings.

== Family and youth ==
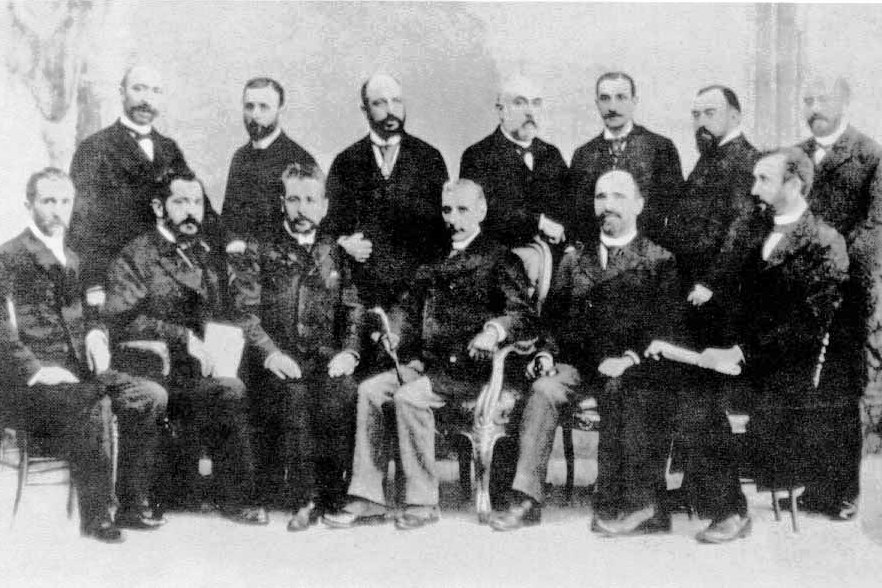
father as Gipuzkoan vice-president, 1894 (1st row, 1st from left)

The Elorzas originated from Biscay, though in the 9th century some of them took root in Gipuzkoa and settled near the town of Legazpia. Over the centuries this noble Basque family got very branched and many Elorzas made it to Spanish history as civil servants, military commanders, religious hierarchs or businessmen, serving either on the peninsula or overseas. One branch was related to the town of Azpeitia at least since the early 16th century; in the mid-19th century the Elorzas were one of the most recognized families in the city and held various prominent local roles. The father of Julián, Juan José Elorza Aizpuru, studied law in Madrid in the mid-1860s; having returned to Azpeitia he started practicing as a lawyer and worked for the Gipuzkoan self-government, Diputación Provincial, as its secretary. During the Third Carlist War he joined the legitimists and in their administration acted as secretary of Miguel Dorronsoro Ceberio. During the early Restoration period he was elected to the Azpeitia city council; in the early 1880s he served as deputy mayor. In 1891 he reached the highest Gipuzkoan political strata when nominated to Diputación Provincial; periodically holding the post of vice-president, he served as a Carlist deputy until 1897.

Juan José Elorza married his relative Catalina Aizpuru Iriarte (died 1926), a girl from another distinguished Azpeitian family; they settled in Azpeitia. It is not clear how many children the couple had; it is known they had at least two sons and one daughter, all brought up in pious religious ambience. Julián was first educated in the most prestigious conservative establishment in Vascongadas, the Jesuit college of Orduña; it is there where he obtained the baccalaureate. He then followed in the footsteps of his father and commenced law studies in Madrid; after an 1895-1897 spell in facultad de derecho of Universidad Central Julián later completed his education in the University of Oñati. Following graduation he returned to Azpeitia and took over the law practice of his late father; he was first noted as abogado in 1903.

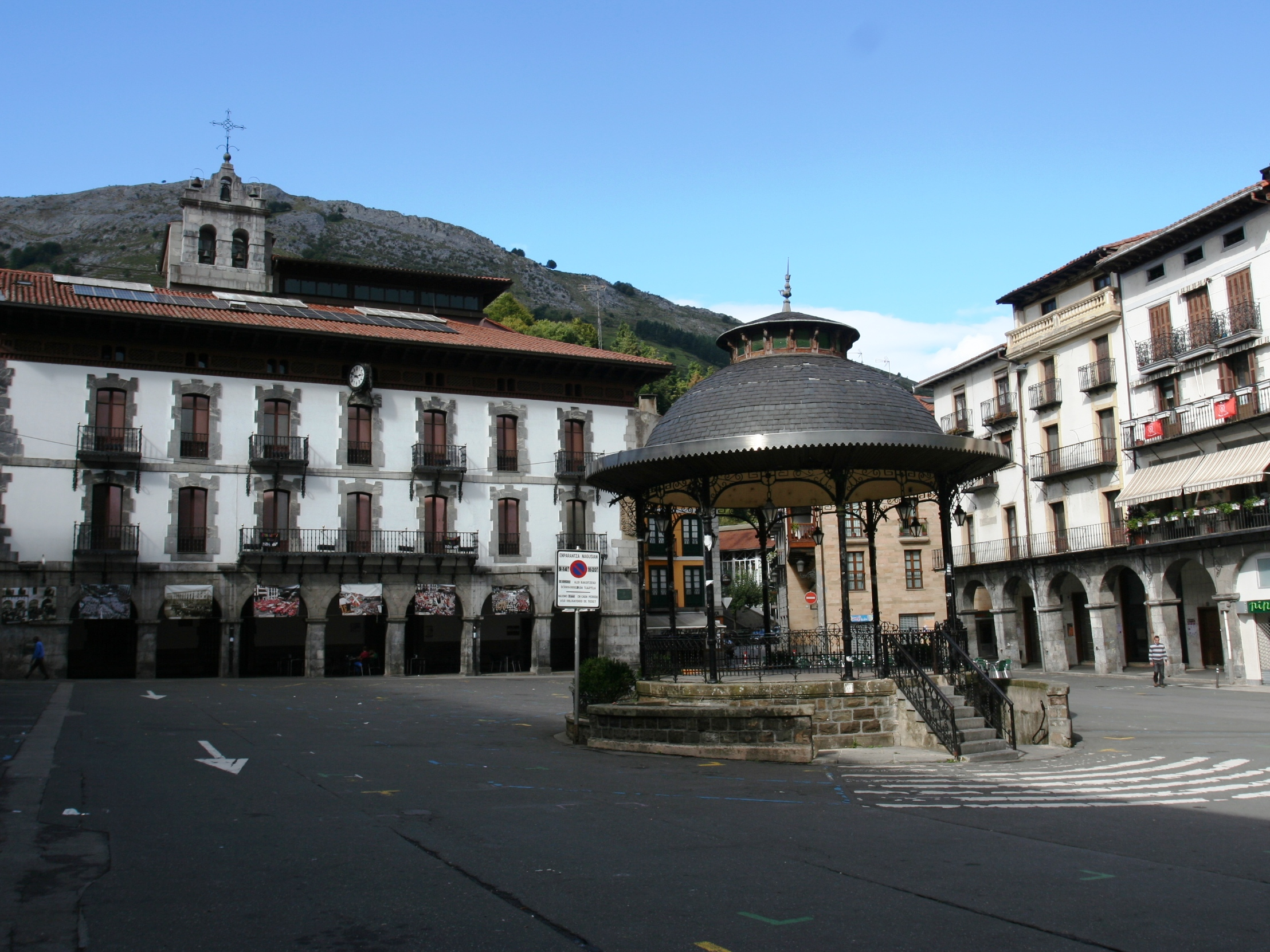
Azpeitia market square

Julián Elorza got married fairly late; in 1922 he wed Visitación Urizar, descendant to a well-to-do bourgeoisie Biscay family from Berriz. Her close relative José Urizar was a deputy to the Biscay provincial diputación and her uncle was the archpriest of San Sebastián; the Urizars were known rather for Liberal political preferences. The couple settled in Azpeitia and had two sons, born in the mid-1920s. The older one, Julián Elorza Urizar, died as a 13-year-old boy in 1936; circumstances of his death are not clear. The younger one, José Ignacio Elorza Urizar, was a lawyer and entrepreneur; though during late Francoism and in the late 20th century he held various executive posts in Gipuzkoan commercial entities he did not become a public figure. The brother of Julián, Fructuoso Elorza Aizpuru, was also a lawyer and served as mayor of Azpeitia during the late Restoration period; his son and Julián's nephew volunteered to requeté and died in combat in 1937.

== Gipuzkoan deputy ==
Carlist standard

Following a few years of his own law practice, in the early 20th century, Elorza was appointed the Azpeitia municipal judge; he held the job from 1907 latest. Coming from the Carlist family he inherited the same Traditionalist outlook, though he preferred to donate money and collect Carlist memorabilia rather than to engage in outward party militancy; none of the studies dealing with Carlism of the era notes him as involved in the organization. According to scholars he was among “relatively open-minded people”. On good terms with Basque nationalists and republican foralists, Elorza was an acceptable candidate to the provincial self-government, though exact circumstances of his 1911 nomination to Diputación Provincial at an unusually young age of 32 are not clear. It is known that he ran as a Carlist and had no rivals. Other parties, especially the all-powerful Azpeitian Integrists, refrained from fielding own candidates; perhaps Elorza's nomination was sort of a tribute to his late father. He was declared victorious according to the notorious Article 29.

Elorza's first years in the Gipuzkoan self-government were not punctuated by noteworthy events; he remained in the shadow of the provincial Carlist jefé and the Diputación president at the same time, marquis of Valde-Espina, and strictly followed his lead, e.g. when in 1912 dealing with apparent incompetence of some deputies. Re-elected as a Carlist candidate in 1913 he gradually assumed more active stance; scholars note that together with other newcomers in the Diputación, Ignacio Pérez-Arregui and José de Orueta, he provided an impulse directing the body towards the Basque question. Following another re-election in 1916 he was already heavily engaged in negotiations with the Madrid government, playing key role in discussions on renewal of the periodical provincial Concierto Económico agreement.

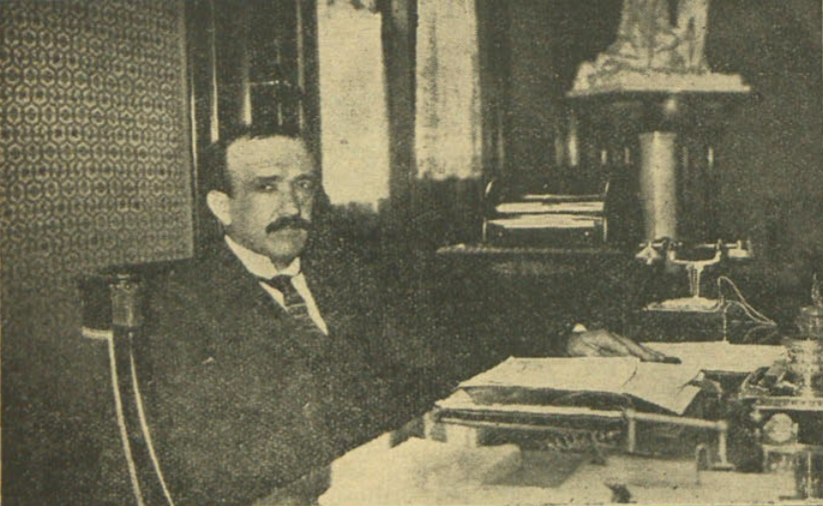
Elorza, 1919

In 1917, Elorza took part in Asamblea de Vitoria, a joint session of Gipuzkoan, Biscay and Alavese provincial deputies; impressed by emergence of the Catalan Mancomunitat, they voiced for separate Basque establishments. Their vague statement advanced 2 options, re-introduction of foral laws scrapped in course of the 19th century as the preferred one or introduction of regional autonomy as the backup solution. Elorza enthusiastically contributed to the message; present-day scholars count him as “uno de los líderes del movimiento autonómico de 1917-1919” and representative of “autonomismo guipuzcoano”, the current which focused on separate provincial regulations. Though all his life averse to taking part in public rallies, Elorza was even noted promoting the concept at local municipal gatherings, e.g. in Tolosa. Following his increasingly active stance he was gaining recognition among fellow deputies; in 1918, he was already vice-president of Comisión Provincial. In May 1919, he ascended to the highest Gipuzkoan job and replaced Valde-Espina as president of Diputación.

== SEV president, early years ==
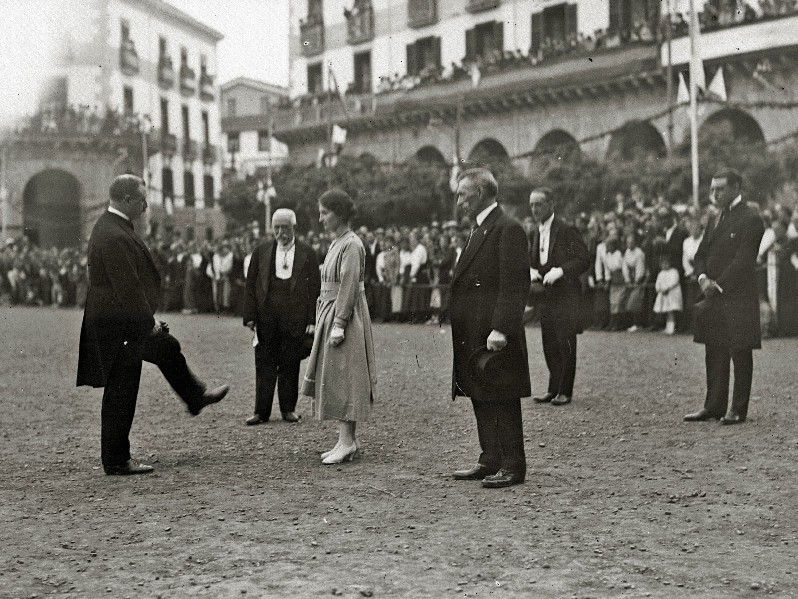
I. Congreso de Estudios Vascos

As member of Gipuzkoan Diputación Elorza hugely contributed to organization of the 1918 Primer Congreso de Estudios Vascos in Oñati, a Basque cultural and scientific initiative; he tried to shape it in line with “old Carlist foralism". The Congress turned a great success and gave rise to Sociedad de Estudios Vascos, later to be known by its Basque name as Eusko Ikaskuntza. Each of 4 vasco-navarrese provincial diputations was entitled to 1 seat in the SEV's Comisión Ejecutiva; Elorza was nominated the representative of Gipuzkoa. In 1919 and in recognition of his contribution, though also with a view to his political position as head of the Gipuzkoan self-government, members of the Comisión elected him the president of SEV. He assumed the role enthusiastically, yet his exalted public addresses which hailed the Basques and their love of liberty did not advance political demands and were flavored with conservative, Carlist zeal rather than with Basque nationalism. From 1919 onwards Elorza was vital for further growth of SEV; as its president and president of Gipuzkoan self-government at the same time he shielded the Sociedad politically, provided financial support, facilitated day-to-day activities and ensured prestige.

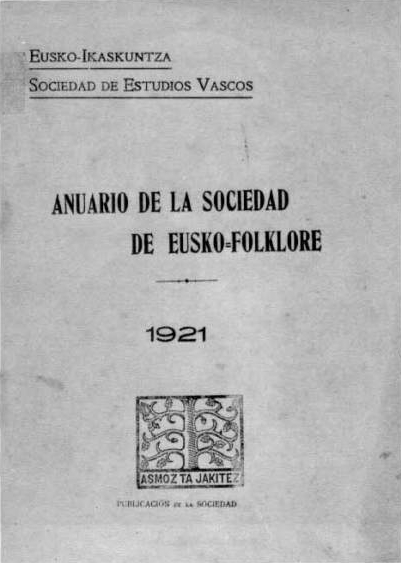
SEV early publication, 1921

Elorza has always been an advocate of Basque-Navarrese unity and he hailed Laurak Bat as the symbol of all Basques; prior to the 2. SEV Congress in Pamplona in 1920 he went to great lengths to ensure that the Navarrese and Pamplonese authorities, dominated by the Carlists and suspicious of Basque nationalism, support the project. During the 3. SEV Congress in Guernica in 1922 Elorza caused a sensation when he approached Alfonso XIII, present during the opening session, in Euskera; the lecture was rather welcome by the addressee, though because of its loyalist tone it raised many eyebrows among the Carlists. Since the early 1920s SEV started to award Premio Julián Elorza, set up for the best work on history of the Basque people.

In 1922 SEV started work on a would-be autonomy statute and Elorza entered a commission entrusted with the task. The move gave rise to controversies, as especially the Biscay self-government, dominated by the Alfonsist Liga Monárquica de Vizcaya, turned increasingly against Elorza; they suspected him of fomenting Basque separatism. The Vizcainos sabotaged Elorza's efforts to set up an all-Basque university and agonized about anticipated Jesuit influences; they denounced Elorza as “el más peligroso de los vascongados actuales”. Preparations for the 4. SEV Congress, planned for 1924 and to be dedicated exclusively to the autonomy question, were moving on grudgingly. In late 1923 SEV issued a possibly vague and non-committal statement which acknowledged the Primo coup and decided that in new political circumstances the 4. Congress should be postponed.

== Gipuzkoan president ==
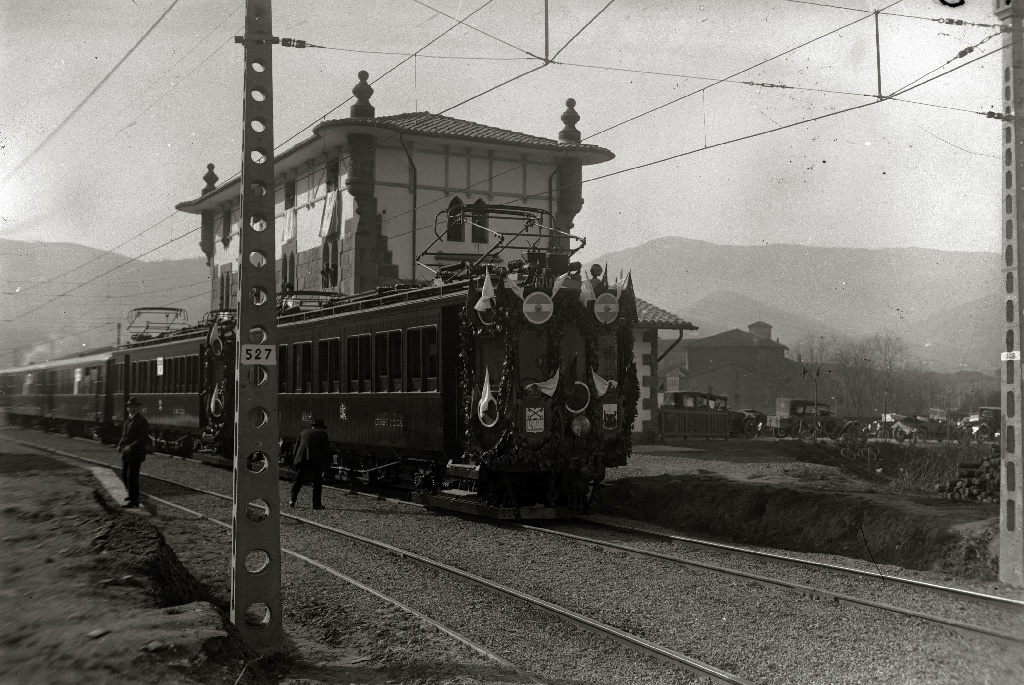
Ferrocarril del Urola

Elorza's tenure as head of the provincial self-government was not marked by overtly political stand. Sporadically he was taking part in Traditionalist rallies like the one in Zumarraga. However, in early 1920 he signed an ultimative letter, addressed to claimant Don Jaime, which demanded setup of an elected Carlist executive; with no response from the claimant, most signatories resigned their posts. As president of the Diputación he was involved in usual administrative tasks like maintenance and development of transport facilities; his most lasting achievement was completion of Ferrocarril del Urola, the railway line launched in 1920 and operated until the 1980s. The thread which during the late 1910s and early 1920s was increasingly gaining prominence was his activity in Sociedad de Estudios Vascos; as Gipuzkoan president he supported the organization – which he also presided – financially and politically. This stand led to growing conflict with the Biscay self-government, anxious about perceived Elorza's pro-nationalist turn. The Vizcainos started to withdraw from common projects; in the early 1920s Elorza came under fire also for financial misfortunes suffered by joint inter-provincial enterprises, especially for the failure of Banco Vasco.

Shortly after the coup of Primo de Rivera Elorza met with presidents of Biscay, Alavese and Navarrese diputaciones; he pushed through a project to seize the moment and present the case for autonomy to the dictator. In late 1923 the presidents finalized Proyecto de Memoria al Directorio Militar, a memorandum prepared mostly by the Gipuzkoan diputación and partially attributed personally to Elorza, who by some is named “principal impulsor del intento autonómico”. The project largely followed the path set by the 1917 Vitoria document, opting for “reintegración foral” or, as option B, for regional-provincial autonomy. Marked by conservative “antijacobinismo”, the proposal advocated among others creation of a Consejo Regional, elevating Basque to official language (along Spanish), introduction of autonomous regulations related to justice, military service, economy and education, and wide municipal autonomy. Elorza later met with Primo personally to present the case.

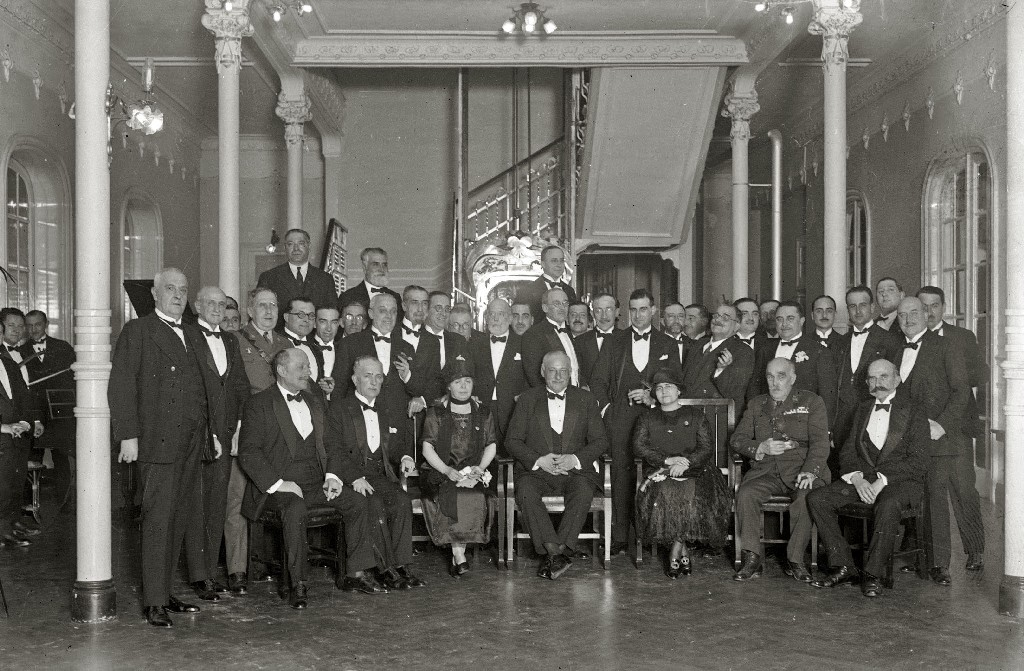
Primo de Rivera and members of the Gipuzkoan diputación

Scholars claim that while Elorza tried to exercise some pressure on Primo and opposed few of his moves, like appointment of “delegados gubernativos” for every province, he should not be viewed as the dictator's political enemy; he rather tried to bank on apparent primoderiverista re-definition of the system. Still, he failed to convince the dictator and apparently also Alfonso XIII, even though he was admitted in the court in early 1924. However unlike in case of other provinces Primo spared the vasco-navarrese diputaciónes from dissolution, in late 1924 the military administration deposed Elorza from the Gipuzkoan presidency and replaced with Vicente Laffite Obineta, an Alfonsist monarchist from the Maurista faction; Elorza was reduced to vice-president, the function performed through all of 1925. In 1926 many members of the Gipuzkoan Diputación, the body already deprived of most of its competencies, were dismissed and replaced by military appointees; Elorza was among these sacked.

== SEV president, mid-years ==
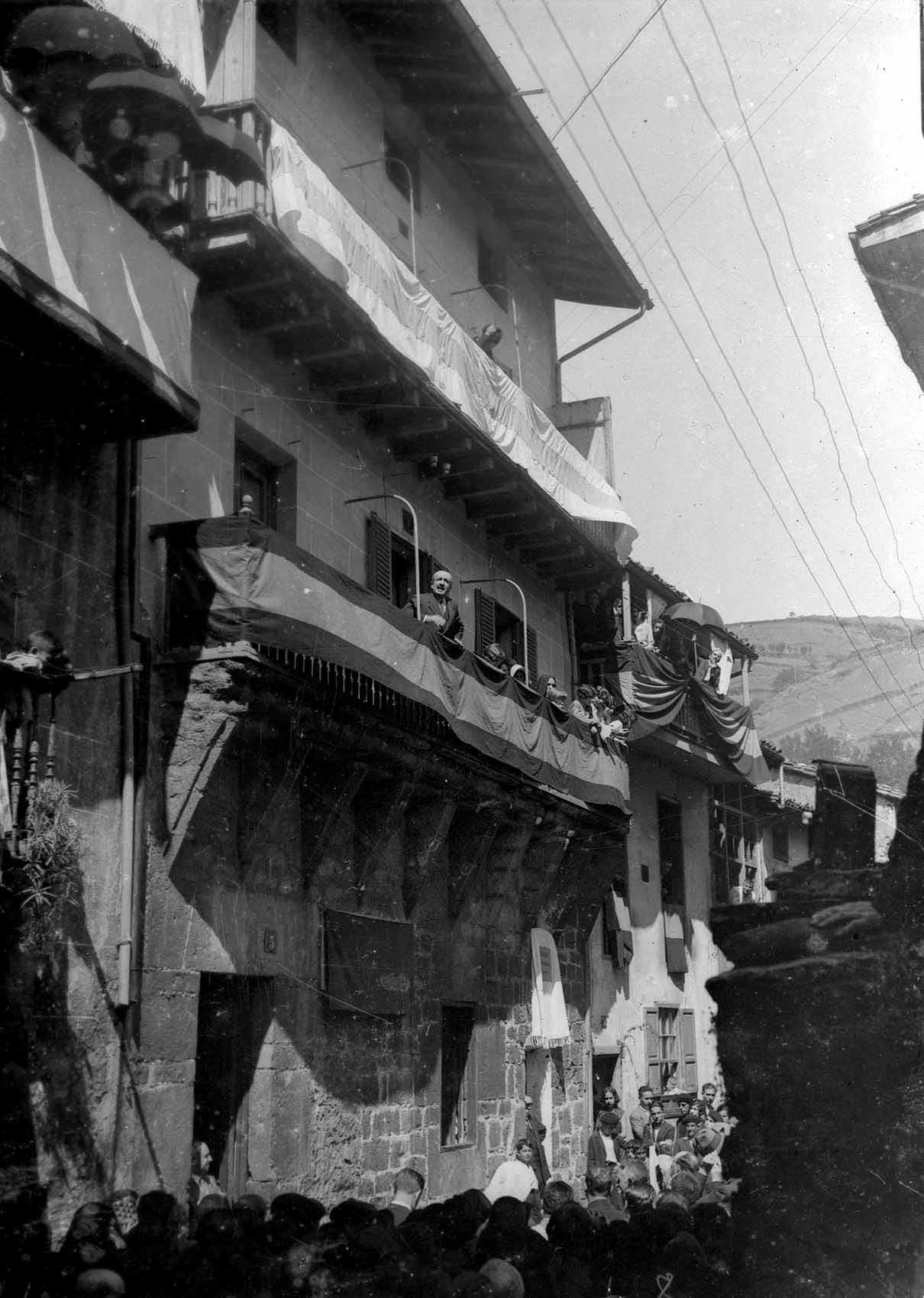
Elorza as SEV president speaking (on balcony)

In the mid-1920s SEV was increasingly torn by differences between the Gipuzkoan and the Biscay disputations; while Elorza approached the dictator with proposals related to bilingualism, Basque university and municipal autonomy, his chief Biscay opponent Lequerica kept denouncing him as representative of “una tendencia contra el sentimiento españolista del País [Vascongado]”. Eventually in 1924 the Biscay board withdrew its representatives from SEV and curtailed links to the organization, with the immediate result of ending financial subsidies. Elorza considered legal action against the Biscay Diputación, but his proposal did not pass at the SEV executive. Some criticism came also from the ecclesiastic hierarchy, as the Church remained cautious about perceived lack of explicit confessional threads in SEV. On the other hand, the Carlist claimant Don Jaime fully supported Elorza's efforts to get the foral laws restored; also within Sociedad he received homages as the one who “dirige a la unión y bien de supais le hace merecedor de la estimación de todos los vascos, sin distinción de opiniones ni intereses”.

As the dictatorial environment made autonomy plans irrelevant and as Gipuzkoan-Biscay conflict increasingly paralyzed Sociedad, after 1924 SEV entered a period of what is referred to as “semi-hibernation”. In 1926, following his dismissal from the Gipuzkoan Diputación, Elorza ceased to represent the province in the SEV's executive, replaced by José Luis Gaytan de Ayala. He retained the post of Sociedad's president though increasingly tired and frustrated, Elorza a few times tried to resign; none of his resignation letters was accepted. Relations with the Vizcainos improved once a new Biscay Diputación was appointed in 1926; the same year in Vitoria Elorza presided over 4. SEV Congress, dedicated not as initially planned to autonomy, but to “orientación y enseñanza profesionales”. This time Alfonso XIII did not attend; the gathering offered Primo their full co-operation. In 1927 Elorza published his best known and in fact only major work, a prologue to Zaballa's study on Concierto Económico; critical about new Calvo's municipal legislation, Elorza retained conciliatory tone versus the Primo regime. However, SEV's exhibition on civil wars, planned to be staged in Pamplona, was cancelled by administration, anxious about crypto-Carlist propaganda.

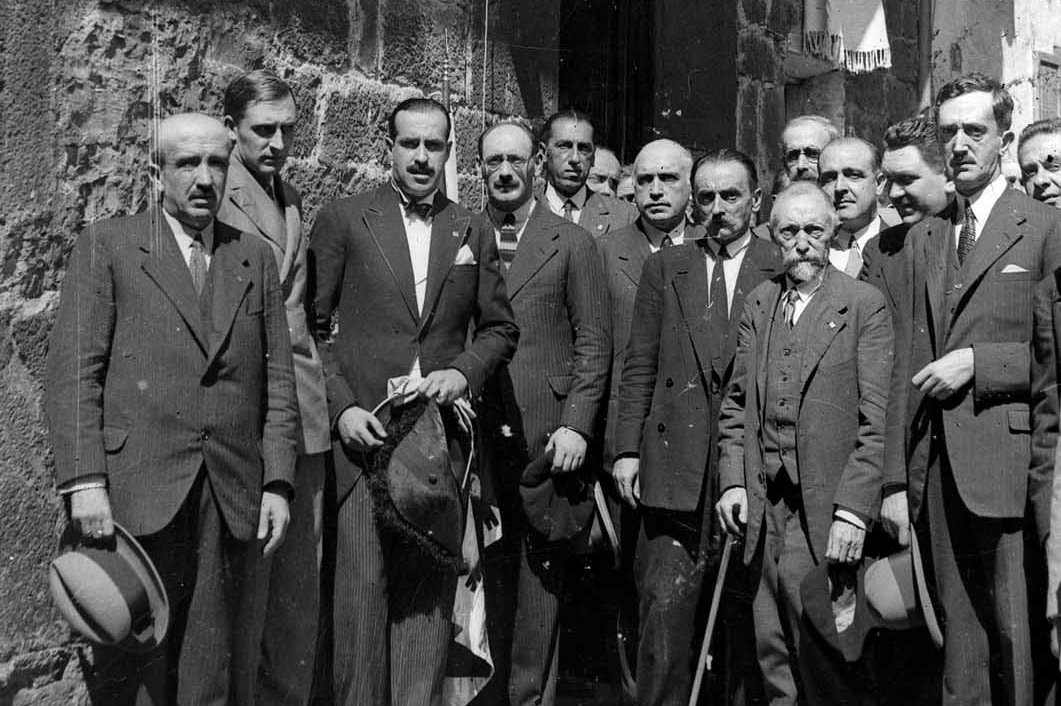
SEV Congress, Bergara 1930 (Elorza 1st from left)

The fall of Primo changed Elorza's fortunes. In 1930 the new Dictablanda regime agreed to include Elorza in the Gipuzkoan Diputación. The same year he headed preparations to the 5. SEV Congress in Bergara; as usual he assumed a withdrawn stand and in wake of fears about politicization of the gathering he left it to the commissions to work out details. He then presided over the Congress works, which renewed the autonomy question and appointed Elorza to a 5-member commission entrusted with drafting a detailed proposal; he formed part also of a sub-comisión on Gipuzkoa. It seems that at the time Elorza still viewed autonomy largely as return to 19th-century fueros, perhaps enhanced with some sort of federative vasco-navarrese regulations. Separatist threads were marginalized; the Congress closed with Gernikako Arbola followed by Marcha Real, though some scholars claim it tended to accidentalism.

== SEV president, late years ==
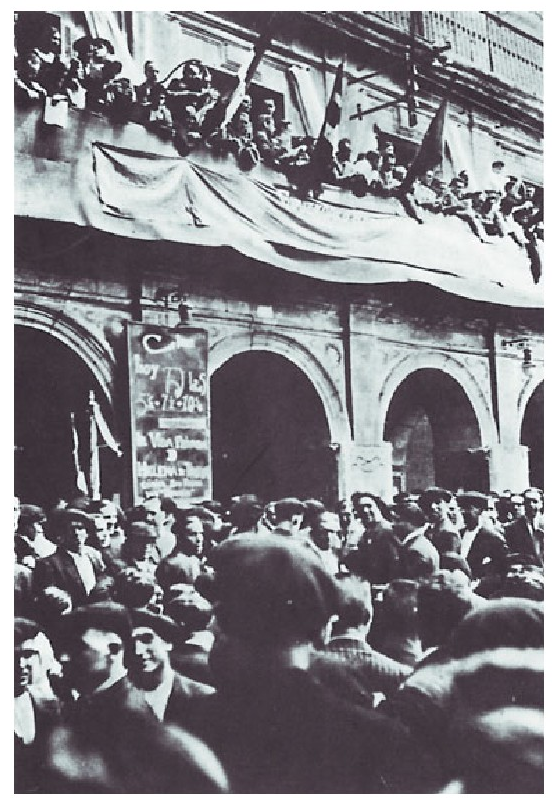
Autonomy Statute declared, Estella 1931

In April 1931 the Republican authorities terminated Elorza's spell in the Gipuzkoan Diputación and dissolved the entire body. His exact views on renewed perspectives for Basque autonomy are not clear; he was impressed by proclamation of the Catalan Republic, but as representative of Gipuzkoa he co-signed a Carlist manifesto which focused on provincial fueros. Asked by vasco-navarrese mayors, SEV stepped up its works on Basque autonomy; its draft proposal envisioned 4 semi-autonomous provinces united in a Basque-Navarrese federation. Elorza was skeptical about proposed separate Basque citizenship and especially about handing over religious issues to Madrid; his objections might have gridlocked the proceedings. To avoid stalemate Elorza left the decisive SEV sitting, opening the way for the draft to be adopted as the official “SEV Statute”.

In June 1931 the “SEV Statute” was subject to approval at a grand meeting of vasco-navarrese mayors in Estella. The gathering was co-presided by Elorza and it introduced changes to the "SEV Statute", mostly in line with his earlier objections; in a frenetic closing session Elorza raised the "¡Gora Euzkadi!" cry. Some SEV members claimed that he inspired and manipulated the amendments; others noted that Elorza and other Carlists like Urquijo hijacked the project. He later excused himself, claiming that in Estella he was speaking not as a SEV president but on his own behalf. The “Estella Statute” became soon irrelevant anyway; when presented to the newly elected Cortes it was declared non-constitutional.

A new 1932 autonomy draft was presented by Comisiones Gestoras, acting in place of the dissolved diputaciones; known as “Gestoras Statute” it advanced a unitary vasco-navarrese autonomy. Elorza decided to support the statute, even though it was less to his liking than the original “SEV Statute”. However, the Navarrese mayors rejected the draft; the statute had to be re-worked for the 3 Basque provinces only. The Gestoras invited all parties to form a joint committee working out the draft. Elorza co-authored a memorandum, aimed for the Carlist executive; it marked his turn towards more intransigent position. He declared the entire process unfair and since executed along republican lines, doomed for failure; the document called for Comunión Tradicionalista not to appoint its representatives, to demand “reintegración foral” as the only proper acknowledgement of Basque aspirations, but also to prohibit any Carlist anti-statute propaganda. The renewed “Gestoras Statute” was prepared with no Carlist participation; in 1933 it was approved in a referendum in Gipuzkoa and Biscay, but rejected in Alava; the project was stalled again.

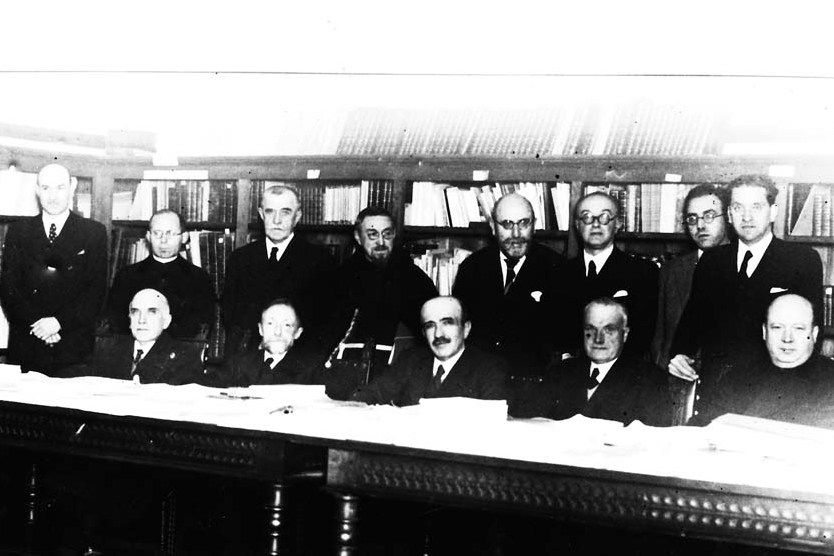
sitting of SEV executive, 1935 (Elorza 1st row in the middle)

In 1934 Elorza presided over the 6. SEV Congress in Bilbao, a feeble gathering dedicated to natural sciences. At that time Sociedad tended to inactivity and Elorza himself was better known for his Carlist engagements. A number of times he participated in Traditionalist rallies, where he used to speak in Euskera; he was also elected as “vocal adjunto” to the Gipuzkoan Junta Provincial, the only post he is known to hold in the organization; in 1935 he was already subject to some ridicule on part of left-wing press.

== Retiree ==
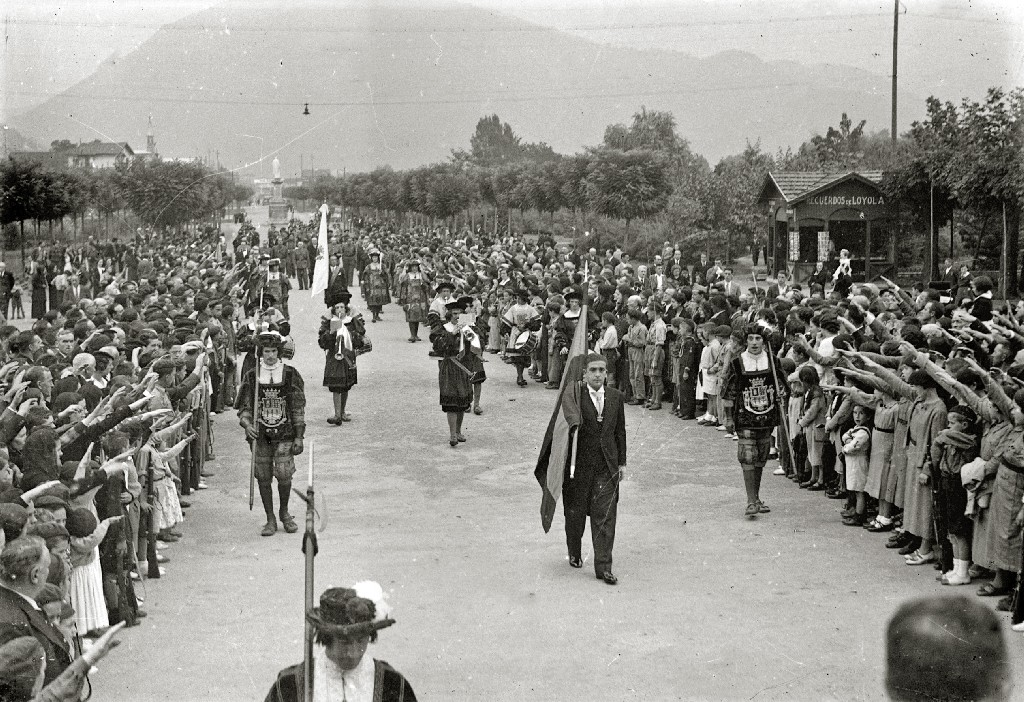
Azpeitia, early Francoism

It is not clear whether Elorza was anyhow involved in the Carlist conspiracy of early 1936 or whether he was even aware of the coup planned; he was certainly engaged in preparations to the 7. SEV Congress, to be held in Estella in September 1936. Outbreak of the Civil War caught him in Azpeitia, but none of the sources consulted provides any information on his fate during 2 months when the Republicans controlled the town; in mid-September Azpeitia was seized by the Carlist troops. In January 1937 he was briefly detained by the Falangists and placed in a San Sebastián prison. According to one source the reason was his harsh criticism of Nationalist repression carried out in Gipuzkoa, according to another Elorza was arrested because of his favorable comments related to a radio address by president of the autonomous Basque state, José Antonio Aguirre. Circumstances of his release are not known.

At unspecified time – it is not clear whether before of after the incarceration episode – Elorza was reportedly asked to follow his brother Fructuoso and engage in the emerging Nationalist structures, perhaps assuming some public role. He declined and declared that “no es este mi momento”. His only wartime public activity was noted in mid-1937, when a few Azpeitian girls were brought to court charged with fomenting Basque nationalism and with earlier engagement in anti-Carlist repression. Elorza testified speaking in favor of the accused, who eventually were either released or received minor fines. He then withdrew into privacy, even though as late as in 1939 he was mentioned on societé columns of local press. He is not known to have undertook any efforts to resume SEV activities in the Francoist Spain or to have remained in touch with Basque émigrés who tried to re-activate SEV on exile in France, though in the early 1940s he exchanged correspondence with the then exiled former Secretary General of SEV, Angel de Apraiz y Buesa. Elorza was reportedly profoundly depressed by Francoist legislation, which stripped Gipuzkoa of any remnants of separate establishments.

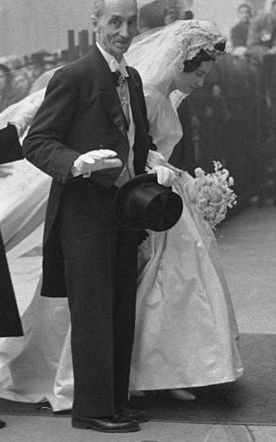
Don Javier, 1960

There is almost no information available on the last 20 years of Elorza's life; none of the sources consulted notes him as engaged in either public activities or semi-clandestine Carlist structures. However, he remained in touch with the Traditionalist circles, as in 1953 he took part in the Mártires de la Tradición rally in San Sebastián. In 1961, when the Carlist claimant Don Javier intended to set up a joint vasco-navarrese executive structure of the party, Elorza was considered a candidate as the representative of Gipuzkoa. The move was intended to attract the Basques, increasingly leaning towards nationalism; with his pro-autonomy record Elorza was supposed to enhance Carlist pro-Basque credentials. As Elorza's health has already massively deteriorated and he was hardly leaving home the nomination would have been largely fictitious, but the project was abandoned anyway.

== Reception and legacy ==
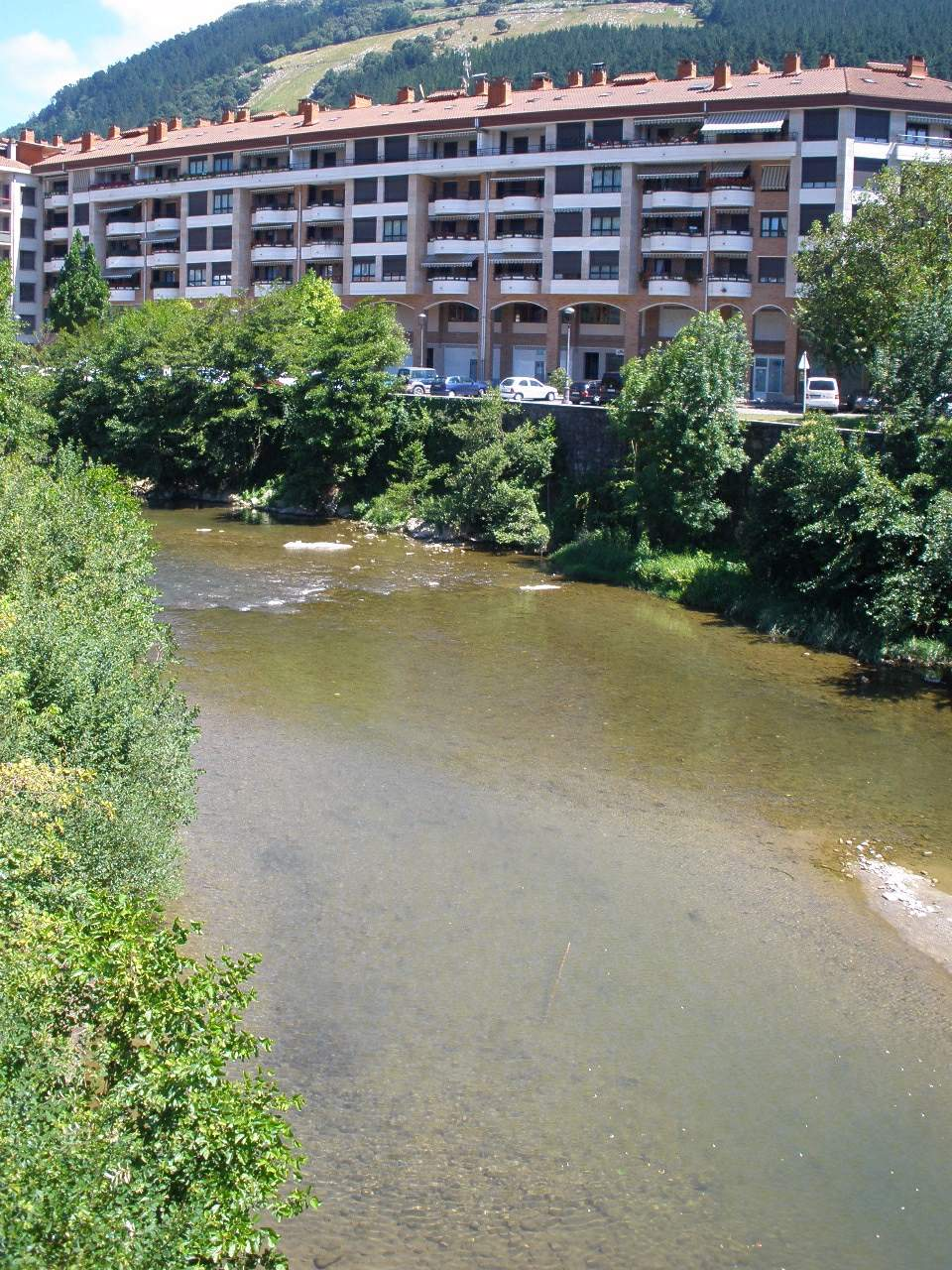
Avenida Julian Elorza, Azpeitia

Elorza represents an identity spanning Carlism and peripheral nationalism. It was by no means unusual and since the late 19th century many such cases emerged on the borderlands in-between Traditionalism and emerging Basque, Galician, Cantabrian or Catalan national movements. Some personalities following a period of indecision and hope that the two concepts can be aligned have eventually decided to break with Carlism; within the Basque ambience this is e.g. the case of Daniel Irujo. Julián Elorza has never moved to this stage and has always nurtured faith in viability of “carlo-nacionalismo”.

Elorza's Carlist credentials are not in doubt; coming from the Carlist family he declared his loyalty to the claimant in 1920 and featured in plans of another claimant in 1961. However, within Carlism he has always been a back-row figure. He has never held important posts in the party structure and barely held any posts in the organization at all, he has never represented the movement in popular elections, he has never contributed to Carlist press and he has been rarely taking part in Traditionalist rallies. While Carlists were typically associated with intransigency and pugnacity if not indeed fanaticism, Elorza has usually demonstrated a penchant for compromise.

The Basque case that Elorza advanced was shaped along Traditionalist lines. In terms of legal arrangements he stuck to the concept of re-implementation of old province-specific separate arrangements perhaps integrated in a vague, vasco-navarrese framework. In terms of cultural model he opted for traditional Basque heritage, entrenched in rural, religious, conservative ethnicity. However, when faced with modern Basque nationalism Elorza was prepared to bend his line; though with little enthusiasm he supported the concept of unitary vasco-navarrese and then even Basque regional autonomy and he was increasingly moving from an ethnicity-based cultural Basque identity to a nationality-based political one. Few of his fellow Carlists – like Julio Urquijo or Joaquín Beunza – were ready to go that far. However, Elorza was prepared to move where no other Carlist agreed to go; he accepted the ikurriña and during the Civil War he probably publicly spoke in favor of Aguirre. His withdrawal into privacy after 1939 is flavored with the sense of utter defeat; not only carlo-nacionalismo proved impossible, but both Carlist and Basque ideas were suppressed by the emerging Francoism.

Elorza has not earned a scientific historiographic monograph yet, be it an article or a major work, and his name appears mostly in studies dedicated either to Sociedad de Estudios Vascos or to the Gipuzkoan diputación. His memory is cherished neither by the Basque nationalists nor by the Carlists, though as longtime president of SEV he is present in the Eusko Ikaskuntza related websites. When noted in public discourse, he is introduced as a high Gipuzkoan public official and an efficient administrator. His death was acknowledged in a dedicated session of the Azpeitian ayuntamiento and a major street in Azpeitia is still named after him.

== See also ==
- Carlism
- Traditionalism (Spain)
- Estatuto de Autonomía del País Vasco de 1936
- Diputación Foral de Guipúzcoa
- Sociedad de Estudios Vascos
