= Chema Madoz =

Spanish photographer (born 1958)

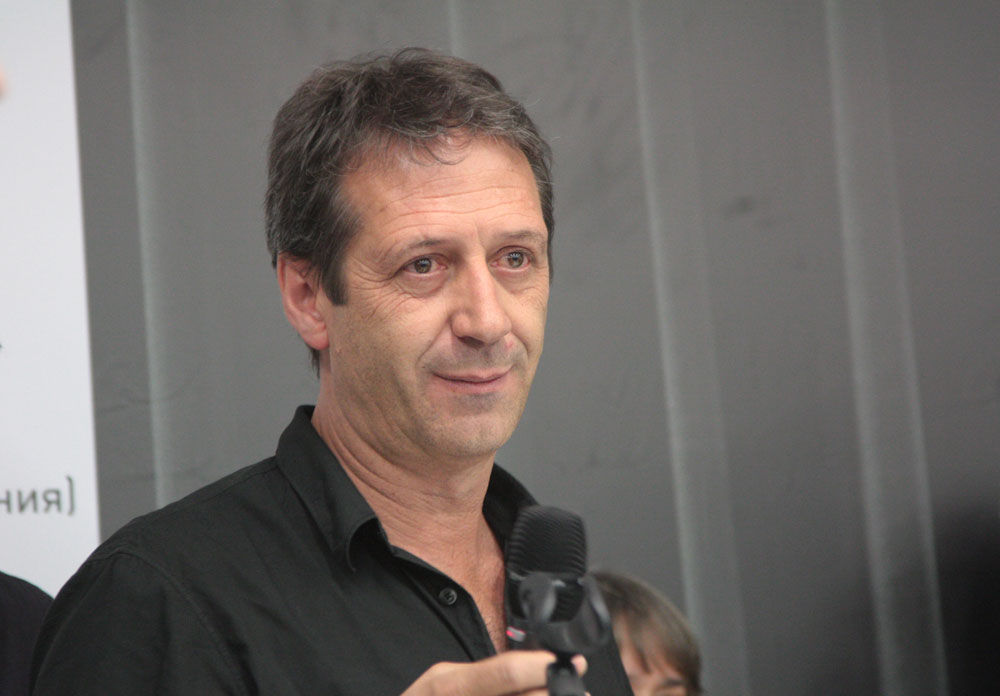
Madoz in 2011

Jose Maria Rodriguez Madoz (born 1958) better known as Chema Madoz, is a Spanish photographer, best known for his black and white surrealist and poetic photographs.

Chema Madoz studied Art History at Universidad Complutense de Madrid between 1980 and 1983. It is here that he was first exposed to the study of photography and imaging.

In an interview published in 2001, Chema explains that he currently uses a Hasselblad camera to take his photos. The book, Chema Madoz: Objetos 1990–1999 was presumably shot entirely with this camera, rather than the 6×6 Mamiya he has used previously.

In November 2011, Prince Felipe and Princess Letizia of Spain, with Chilean first lady Cecilia Morel, opened an exhibition of Chema Madoz's work at the Museo de Arte Contemporáneo (Santiago, Chile).

In 1999 the Centro Gallego de Arte Contemporáneo in Santiago de Compostela showed a solo exhibition of works produced between 1996 and 1997. At the end of that year, the Museo Nacional Centro de Arte Reina Sofía dedicated to him the solo exhibition "Objetos 1990 - 1999", the first retrospective exhibition that this museum dedicated to a Spanish photographer during his lifetime.

== Books ==
- Chema Madoz (1998, CGAC, Xunta de Galicia)
- Chema Madoz (1989-1999, Museo Nacional Arte Reina Sofia)
- Chema Madoz 2000-2005 (Fundacion Telefonica. Editorial Aldeasa)
- El mundo de las diez mil cosas - Fotografias 1990-1999 (Catalogo Sala Robayera. Cantabtria)
- Chema Madoz (Catalogo Ayuntamiento de Navarra)
- Fotopoemario Joan Brossa/Chema Madoz (Editorial La Fabrica)
- Chema Madoz (Editorial Contraluz)
- Chema Madoz habla con Alejandro Castellote
- Conversaciones con fotografos Helena Almeida, Joan Fontcuberta, Chema Madoz, Vik Muniz (2012, Editorial la Fabrica)
- Chema Madoz - Poesia Visual (2012, Editorial La Fabrica)
- Chema Madoz - Obras Maestras (2012, Editorial La Fabrica)
- Nuevas Greguerias - Ramon Gomez De La Serna / Chema Madoz (Editorial La Fabrica)
- Mixtos (Editorial Mestizo)
- Memorie de la photographie (Editions Assouline)
- Fotografies par al llibre de salms d'acquests vells cecs Salvador Espriu (2008, Caixa de Catalunya)
- Tempo Madoz (La Oficina ediciones)
- Chema Madoz XXI
- Jardìn Botanico (2020)

== Bibliography ==
- Chema Madoz: Objetos 1990–1999. 2001. ISBN 84-8003-186-7
- "Chema Madoz "Metamorfosis del Pensamiento" Exhibition Catalog of the exhibition: Chema Madoz "Metamorfosis del Pensamiento" on D.O.P. Foundation & Odalys Foundation at Caracas, Venezuela.

== Awards and honors ==
- 16th Higashikawa Overseas Photographer Prize (2000)
