= Tlamatini =

Nahuatl word

Tlamatini (plural tlamatinime) is a Nahuatl language word meaning "someone who knows something", generally translated as "wise man". The word is analyzable as derived from the transitive verb mati "to know" with the prefix tla-, indicating an unspecified inanimate object translatable by "something" and the derivational suffix -ni meaning "a person who is characterized by ...": hence tla-mati-ni "a person who is characterized by knowing something" or more to the point "a knower".

The famous Nahuatl language translator and interpreter Miguel León-Portilla refers to the tlamatini as philosophers and they are the subject of his book Aztec Thought and Culture.
