= Iñaki Aizpurúa =

Spanish footballer

Personal information
- Full name: José Ignacio Aizpurúa Alzaga
- Date of birth: 5 May 1970 (age 56)
- Place of birth: Irun, Spain
- Height: 1.90 m (6 ft 3 in)
- Position: Goalkeeper

Senior career*
Years	Team	Apps	(Gls)
1986–1991	CD Landetxa		
1991–1994	Real Unión		
1994–2003	Salamanca	167	(0)
2002–2003	Real Sociedad	0	(0)
2002–2003	→ Levante (loan)	9	(0)
2003–2007	Levante	8	(0)
Total		184	(0)
- * Club domestic league appearances and goals

José Ignacio 'Iñaki' Aizpurúa Alzaga (born 5 May 1970) is a Spanish retired footballer who played as a goalkeeper.

He spent most of his 16-year professional career with Salamanca, playing in three La Liga seasons with the club. His last years were spent with Levante, where he later worked in other capacities.

== Club career ==
Born in Irun, Basque Country, Aizpurúa made his professional debut at the age of 21, playing three seasons with hometown's Real Unión, the last spent in the third division. Subsequently, he left for UD Salamanca, where he remained eight years making nearly 200 official appearances; in 1995–96 he appeared in 40 La Liga games, but the Castile and León side were relegated back to the second level after finishing last.

In summer 2003, after a season loaned at Levante UD by Real Sociedad – which first loaned the player to Burgos CF, aborting the move following the club's relegation from division two due to irregularities– Aizpurúa signed permanently with the same team, only managing to be a backup in his four overall seasons at the Estadio Ciudad de Valencia; in 2004–05, the only year he spent in the top flight during this timeframe, he did not manage to appear in the league, playing understudy to Juan Luis Mora as the Granotas ranked 18th with the subsequent relegation.

Following his retirement in January 2007 at the age of 36 (he was not registered during that campaign), Aizpurúa continued working with Levante in directorial capacities and as youth system coordinator.
