= Carlos Fernández González =

Mexican businessman

Carlos Fernández (born in Mexico City in 1966) is a Mexican businessman.

Fernández was the CEO of Grupo Modelo from 1997 to 2012. Since 2013, Fernández has been CEO of Grupo Finaccess.

== Education ==
Fernández graduated with a bachelor's degree in industrial engineering from the Universidad Anáhuac. He also studied a course in beer production at the University of California, Davis and completed the executive management AD-2 program at the Instituto Panamericano de Alta Dirección de Empresa.

== Career ==
Fernández became the CEO of Grupo Modelo in 1997, and the Chairman of the Board in 2005. During the time he was head of Grupo Modelo the company became the seventh largest brewing group in the world.

In 2013, Fernández became CEO and Chairman of the Board of Directors of Grupo Finaccess.

Fernández is a member of the board of directors of Banco Santander. He founded the Academia Mexicana de la Comunicación, Fundación Carolina (Mexico Chapter) and Fundación Beca, and he presided over the Consejo Consultivo del Agua and the Consejo de la Comunicación.

== Writing ==
In 2006, Fernández sponsored the book México 2025: el futuro se construye hoy, by the Centro de Investigación para el Desarrollo, AC (CIDAC), for which he wrote the prologue.

== Awards and recognition ==
In 2000, he was recognized as one of the “global leaders for tomorrow” by the World Economic Forum; in 2002, he received the award for the best international strategist granted by Latin American Business Awards; in 2004, for the role he has played as CEO of Grupo Modelo he received the “World 2004” prize offered by the Mexican business publication Mundo Ejecutivo; in 2005 he was named executive of the year by the food industry, and in 2008, the US-Mexico Chamber of Commerce granted him the “Good Neighbor Award” in Washington, DC.
