= Cristina García Rodero =

Spanish photographer

The Most Illustrious Cristina García Rodero 1st Marchioness of Valle de Alcudia
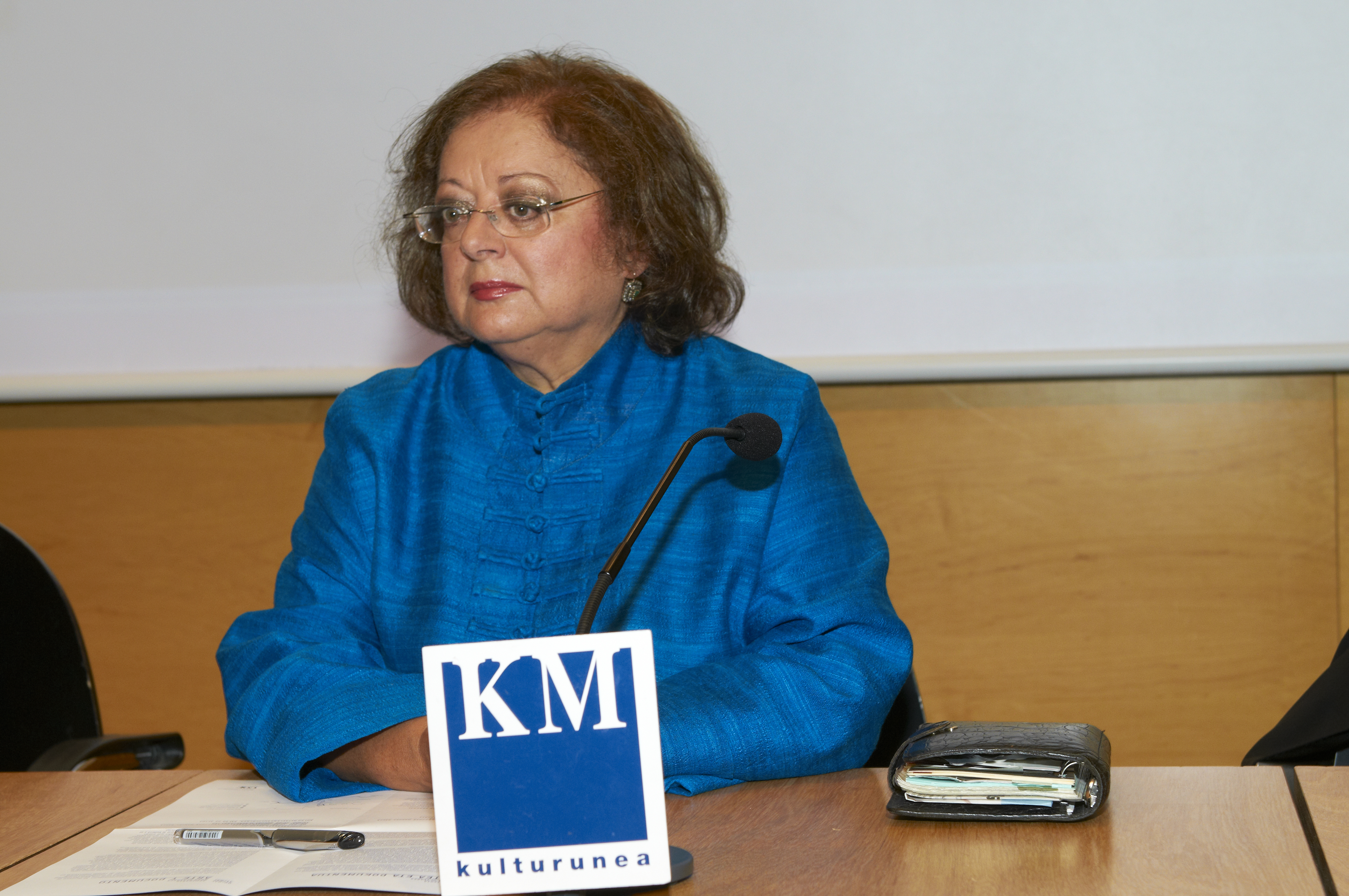
- García Rodero in 2011
- Born: October 14, 1949 (age 76); Puertollano, Spain
- Education: Complutense University of Madrid
- Style: Photography

Cristina García Rodero, 1st Marchioness of Valle de Alcudia (born 14 October 1949), is a Spanish photographer and member of Magnum Photos and Agence Vu photo agencies.

== Life and work ==
Rodero was born in Puertollano, Spain, in 1949, and studied painting at Complutense University of Madrid. She has worked as a teacher.

Rodero photographs the persistence of rural traditions in modern times, such as religious rites and festivals in Spain. In Spain she is among the most celebrated documentary photographers.

Rodero joined Magnum Photos in 2005 and became a full member in 2009. In an Extraordinary Plenary Session held by the Royal Academy of Fine Arts of San Fernando on Monday, February 18, 2013, she was elected as a Full Academician for the Section of New Image Arts, occupying the vacant Medal held by Luis García Berlanga.

The city of Puertollano, where she was born, inaugurated the "Cristina García Rodero" Museum in 2018. A large part of the photographer's work is exhibited there. The Cristina García Rodero Museum is located in the old municipal museum of Puertollano.There are more than 2,100 square meters distributed over three floors in which are displayed about 200 photographs of the artist.

In June 2025, King Felipe VI created her as Marchioness of Valle de Alcudia.

== Publications ==
- España oculta.
  - España oculta. Barcelona: Lunwerg, 1989, 1998. ISBN 84-7782-779-6. (in Spanish)
  - España oculta. Munich: Bucher, 1990. ISBN 3765806552. (in German)
  - Espagne occulte. Paris: Contrejour, 1990. ISBN 2859490957. (in French)
- España: Fiestas y ritos. Text by J.M. Caballero Bonald.
  - España: Fiestas y ritos. Barcelona: Lunwerg, 1992. ISBN 847782228X. (in Spanish)
  - Spanien. Feste und Riten. Schaffhausen: Stemmle, 1992. ISBN 3723104436. (in German)
  - Spagna in Fiesta. Milan: Jaca, 1994. ISBN 9788816601536. (in Italian)
  - Festivals and rituals of Spain. New York: Abrams, 1994. ISBN 9780810938397. Translated by Wayne Finke. (in English)
  - Espagne: Fêtes et traditions. Barcelona: Lunwerg, 1994. ISBN 8477823006. (in French)
- Imágenes de una danza: Camuñas, "Pecados y Danzantes". Toledo: Diputación Provincial de Toledo, 1994. ISBN 8487100295. (in Spanish)
- Himerareta Supein-ten (秘められたスペイン展) = España oculta. Mitaka, Tokyo: Mitaka City Gallery of Art, 1994. (in Japanese)
- España Oculta: Public Celebrations in Spain, 1974-1989. Washington, D.C.: Smithsonian Institution Press, 1995. ISBN 9781560985303. Foreword by Julio Caro Baroja and introduction by Mary M. Crain. (in English)
- La realidad múltiple. Logroño: Ochoa, 1995. ISBN 8473594347. (in Spanish)
- Fiestas de primavera en pueblos y aldeas de España. Madrid: Prensa Española General de Revistas, 1998. OCLC 634387795. With César Justel. (in Spanish)
- Grabarka, o monte das 600 cruces: Unha peregrinación ortodoxa en Polonia. Santiago de Compostela: Xunta de Galicia, 2000. ISBN 84-453-2846-8. (in Galician)
- Lo Festivo y lo Sagrado. Madrid: Consejería de Cultura de la Comunidad de Madrid, 2001. OCLC 124031314 (in Spanish)
- Rituales en Haití. Madrid: Ministerio de Educación y Cultura, Dirección General de Bellas Artes y Bienes Culturales, 2001. ISBN 8495183587, ISBN 843693458X. With Laënnec Hurbon.
- Grabarka, el monte de las 6000 cruces: Una peregrinación ortodoxa en Polonia. Granada: Diputación de Granada, 2002. OCLC 433149648. (in Spanish)
- Cristina García Rodero. Rituale; Fotografien. Munich: Deutsche Gesellschaft für christliche Kunst, 2004. ISBN 3932322142. (in German)
- Cristina García Rodero: Historia de una Pasión.
  - Cristina García Rodero: Historia de una Pasión. Madrid: La Fábrica, 2004. ISBN 978-84-95471-92-5. (in Spanish)
  - Cristina García Rodero. Madrid: La Fábrica, 2008. ISBN 9788492841004. Second edition. Includes Historia de una pasión by Julio Llamazares. (in English and Spanish)
- A peregrinación a Santiago en Haití. Santiago de Compostela: Xunta de Galicia, 2004. ISBN 84-453-3832-3. (in English, Spanish, and Galician)
- Paso doble - Cristina García Rodero und Giorgio von Arb: Fotografien zur Volkskultur in Spanien und in der Schweiz. Uster: Edition Villa am Aabach, 2005. ISBN 3952263370. With Giorgio von Arb. (in German and Spanish)
- Cristina García Rodero: María Lionza, la diosa de los ojos de agua. Madrid: Ayuntamiento, 2008. ISBN 8445131362. (in Spanish and English)
- España oculta: Colección de arte contemporáneo Fundación "La Caixa". Barcelona: Obra Social, Fundación "La Caixa", 2010. ISBN 9788499000381. (in Spanish)
- A 1,20 metros: Los derechos de la infancia vistos desde su altura. Madrid: Consejo General de la Abogacía Española, 2010. ISBN 9788461409242. With other contributors. (in Spanish)
- Transtempo. Madrid: La Fábrica; Santiago de Compostela: Xunta de Galicia, Consellería de Cultura e Turismo, 2011. ISBN 9788492841837, ISBN 9788445349564. (in English, Spanish, and Galician)
- Cristina García Rodero: Combatiendo la nada. Alcobendas: Ayuntamiento de Alcobendas, 2012. ISBN 9788493843151. (in English and Spanish)
- Los siete pecados capitales. Palabra e imagen. Madrid: La Fábrica, 2014. ISBN 9788415691419. (in Spanish) With Gustavo Martín Garzo and Elisa Martin Ortega.

== Awards ==
- 1989: Book Award, Rencontres d'Arles, for España Oculta.
- 1989: W. Eugene Smith Grant for her work documenting the culturally important festivals and rituals in rural southern European communities which are about to disappear.
- 1996: Premio Nacional de Fotografía, Spain.
- 1998: Honorary Fellowship of the Royal Photographic Society.
- 2014: Gold Medal of Merit in Labour (Kingdom of Spain, 13 June 2014).

== Solo Exhibition ==
- 2025: Cristina García Rodero. Hidden Spain, Museu Fundación Juan March Palma, traveled to Museo de Arte Abstracto Español, Cuenca

== Exhibitions with others ==
- 1994: The Photographers' Gallery, London.
- 2001: Venice Biennale, Venice.
- 2016: Photobiennale, Moscow

== Collections ==
- Museum of Fine Arts Houston
