= Beer in Mexico =

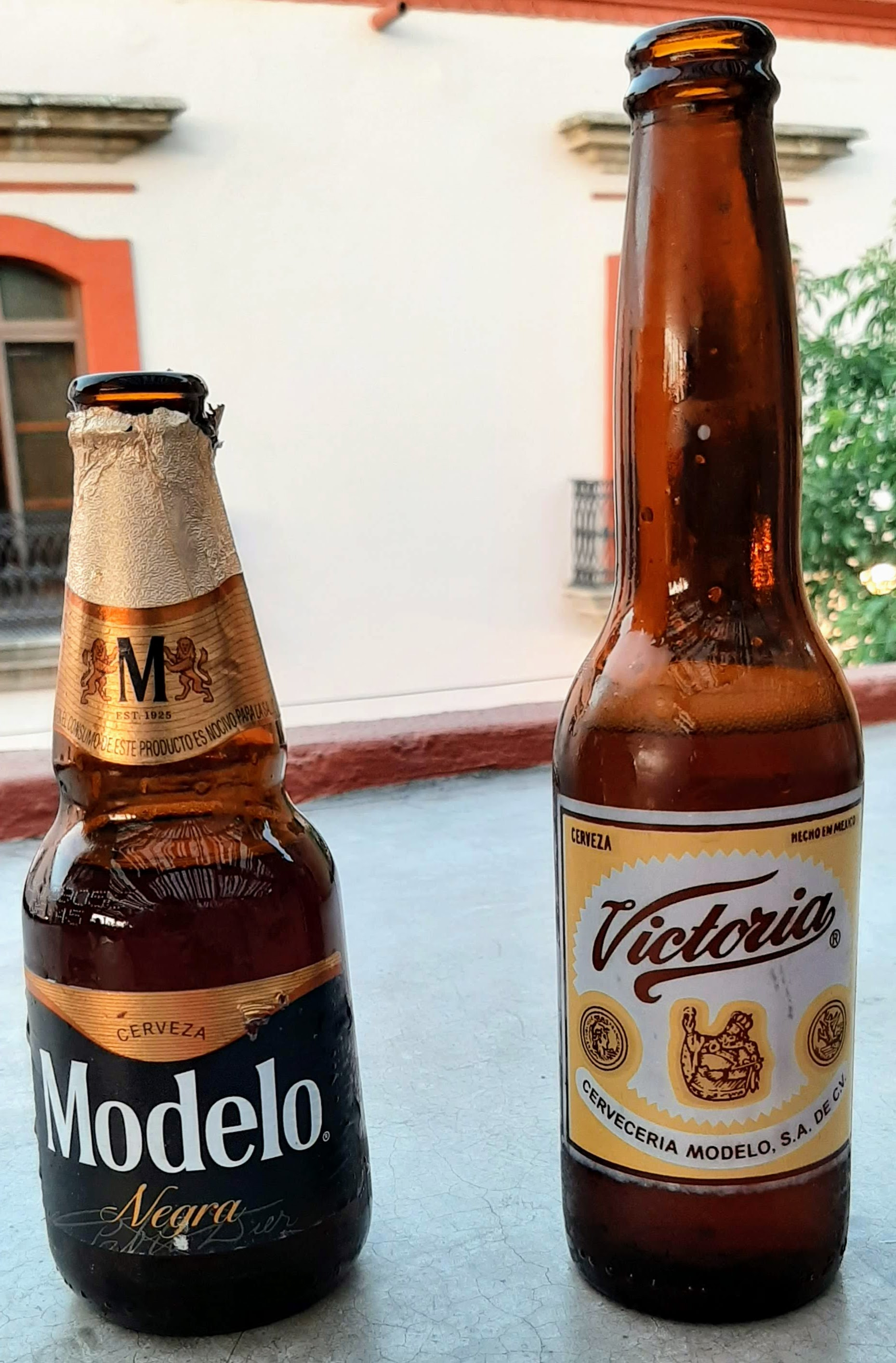
Two common Mexican beers: Modelo and Victoria

The history of beer in Mexico dates from its beginnings during the Spanish conquest of the Aztec Empire. While Mesoamerican cultures knew of fermented alcoholic beverages, including a corn beer, long before the 16th century, European style beer brewed with barley was introduced with the Spanish invasion soon after Hernán Cortés's arrival. Production of this beer here was limited during the colonial period due to the lack of materials and severe restrictions and taxes placed on the product by Spanish authorities. After the Mexican War of Independence, these restrictions disappeared, and the industry was permitted to develop. Furthermore, the arrival of German immigrants during the ephemeral Second Mexican Empire of elected Maximilian I of Mexico, born an Austrian archduke, in the 19th century provided the impetus for the opening of many breweries in various parts of the country.

By 1918, there were 36 brewing companies, but over the 20th century, the industry consolidated until today, only two corporations, Grupo Modelo (now owned by AB InBev) and Cervecería Cuauhtémoc Moctezuma formerly known as FEMSA Cerveza (now owned by Heineken N.V.) control 90% of the Mexican beer market. This industry is one of the most prevalent in the country, with over 63% of the population buying one brand or another. Beer is also a major export for the country, with most going to the United States, but is available in over 150 countries worldwide. In 2022, Mexico was the largest beer exporter in the world.

== History ==
=== 16th century to 19th century ===
Prior to the Spanish conquest of what is now Mexico, there had been fermented alcoholic beverages in Mexico. The best known of these is pulque, which is the fermented sap of the maguey or agave plant. More similar to beer is a lesser-known beverage, called tesgüino or izquiate, brewed by various cultures. This is made from fermented corn, and creates light, amber-colored liquid which is whisked before drinking. Tesgüino can still be found in Mexico today, mostly homemade, in the north and west of Mexico in states such as Chihuahua, Sonora and Colima. Among the Tarahumaras, the drink is used for rituals. A similar beverage, called pozol, is made in Oaxaca, Chiapas and Tabasco with corn and cocoa beans.

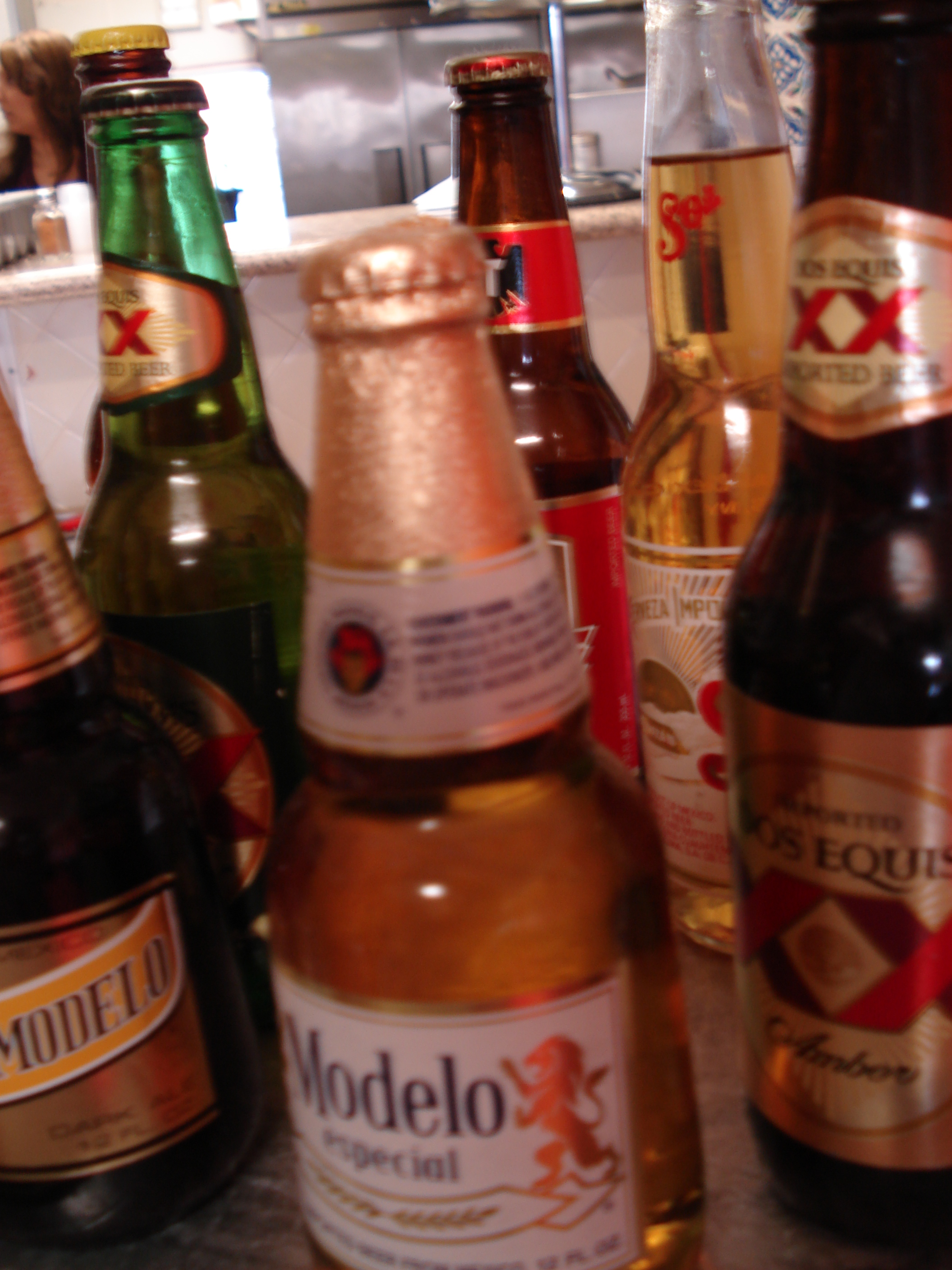
A variety of Mexican beers.

Beer brewed with grain such as barley was produced in small quantities by Hernán Cortés’ soldiers, but it was limited due to the lack of supplies. The first official concession to brew European-style beer was granted to Alfonso de Herrero in 1543 or 1544. Its exact location is unknown, but it is thought to have been located in the south of Mexico City (where Metro Portales is today) or in Amecameca, Mexico State. Herrera's brewery struggled during its first years, as alcohol consumption was highly regulated by authorities, and the new brew had to compete with native beverages. It was also more expensive due to the lack of ingredients. However, the beverage caught on, as it was drunk by colonial authorities, leading others to want it as well. Herrera worked to expand his brewery and the land on which wheat and barley were raised.

In the long run, Herrero's brewery did not survive, and the production of European-style beverages such as beer and wine were heavily taxed and heavily regulated by Spain to protect home markets. The purpose of this was to make colonials import these products from Europe. While the policy mostly worked, beer brewing never entirely ceased. In the years just before independence, beer consumption was becoming established in Mexico, leading to disputes over the rights to produce it. Englishmen Gillons and Mairet, Miguel Ramos Arizpe and Justino Tuallion all claimed exclusive rights to produce beer in Mexico. After the end of the war, the beer produced by the Tuallion brewery was the most popular. After the war, colonial restrictions were gone and the industry was allowed to develop, starting in the 1820s. In 1845, a barley beer flavored with piloncillo was introduced with the names of Pila Seca and La Candelaria by Swiss Bernhard Boldgard and Bavarian Federico Herzog.

The industry truly began to develop in the latter half of the 19th century, due to an influx of German immigrants to Mexico and the short-lived Second Mexican Empire headed by emperor Maximilian I of Mexico of the House of Habsburg, an Austro-Germanic ruling family. The emperor had his own brewer, who produced Vienna-style dark beers. This influence can be seen in two popular brands of Negra Modelo and Dos Equis Ambar.

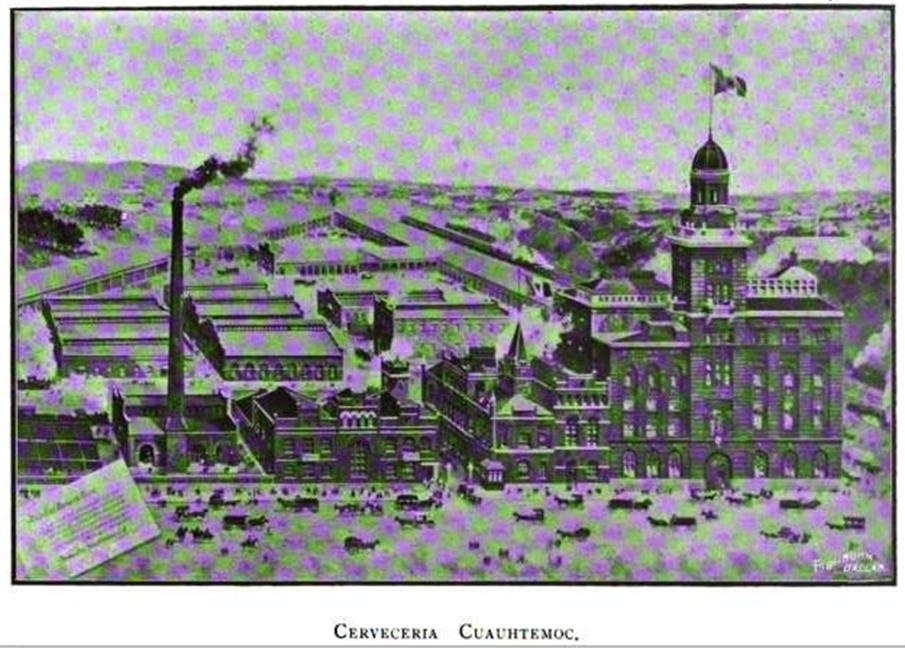
Cervecería Cuauhtemoc in 1890

From the mid-19th to the early 20th century, a large number of breweries were opened in various regions of the country. Some of these include the Cervecería Toluca y México by Swiss Agustín Marendaz in 1865, Cervecería Cruz Blanca in Mexico City by Emil Dercher in 1869 (which produced the first lager), the San Diego Brewery by Carlos Fredenbaen in 1860, the Cervecería Yucateca by José Ponce Solis in Mérida in 1869 (with German equipment and a German brewer), the Gran Cervecería de San Luis in 1882 in San Luis Potosí by Jose M. Otahegui and Juan Fouilloux (a French brewer who imported equipment from Paris), the Fábrica de Cerveza y Hielo in Monterrey in 1886, the Cevercería Piazzini in Monterrey in 1889, the Cervecería Estrella by Juan E. Ohrner in 1890, the Cervecería Guillermo Hasse y Compañia in Orizaba by Henry Manthey, William Hasse, Cuno Van Alten and Adolph Burhard (which started production at 15,000 bottles daily and would later change its name to Cervecería Moctezuma), the Cervecería Chihuahua by Juan Terrazas in Chihuahua in 1896, the Cervecería Sonora by George Gruning, Dr. Albert Hoeffer, and Jacob Schuele in 1896, the Cervecería del Pacífico by Jorge Claussen, Germán Evers and Emilio Philippy in 1900.

The establishment of a railroad system in Mexico at the end of the 19th century allowed the import of machinery and malt from the United States, but it also forced Mexican breweries to compete against U.S. beer, which began to be distributed in the country. By 1890, the first substantial, industrial brewing facility in the country was built in Monterrey by Cevercería Cuauhtémoc. Four years later, another large brewery, Cervecería Moctezuma, began in Orizaba.

=== 20th century ===
By 1918, there were 36 beer producers in Mexico. Prohibition in the United States during the 1920s helped the Mexican beer industry, with Americans crossing the border to drink. This spurred breweries along the border, such as Mexicali Brewery and the Aztec Brewing Company, both in Baja California. Beer became big business by the early 20th century. By 1925, despite the strong preference still for pulque in the center of the country, Mexico was producing 50,000 liters of beer per year. To promote their product further, European immigrant beer brewers in the first part of the 20th century campaigned against native drinks such as pulque. They claimed such drinks were produced by unsanitary methods (including the use of feces as a fermenting agent) and promoted beer as "rigorously hygienic and modern". The strategy proved successful, with pulque now generally looked-down-upon and imbibed by relatively few people, with Mexican-brewed beer ubiquitous and extremely popular.

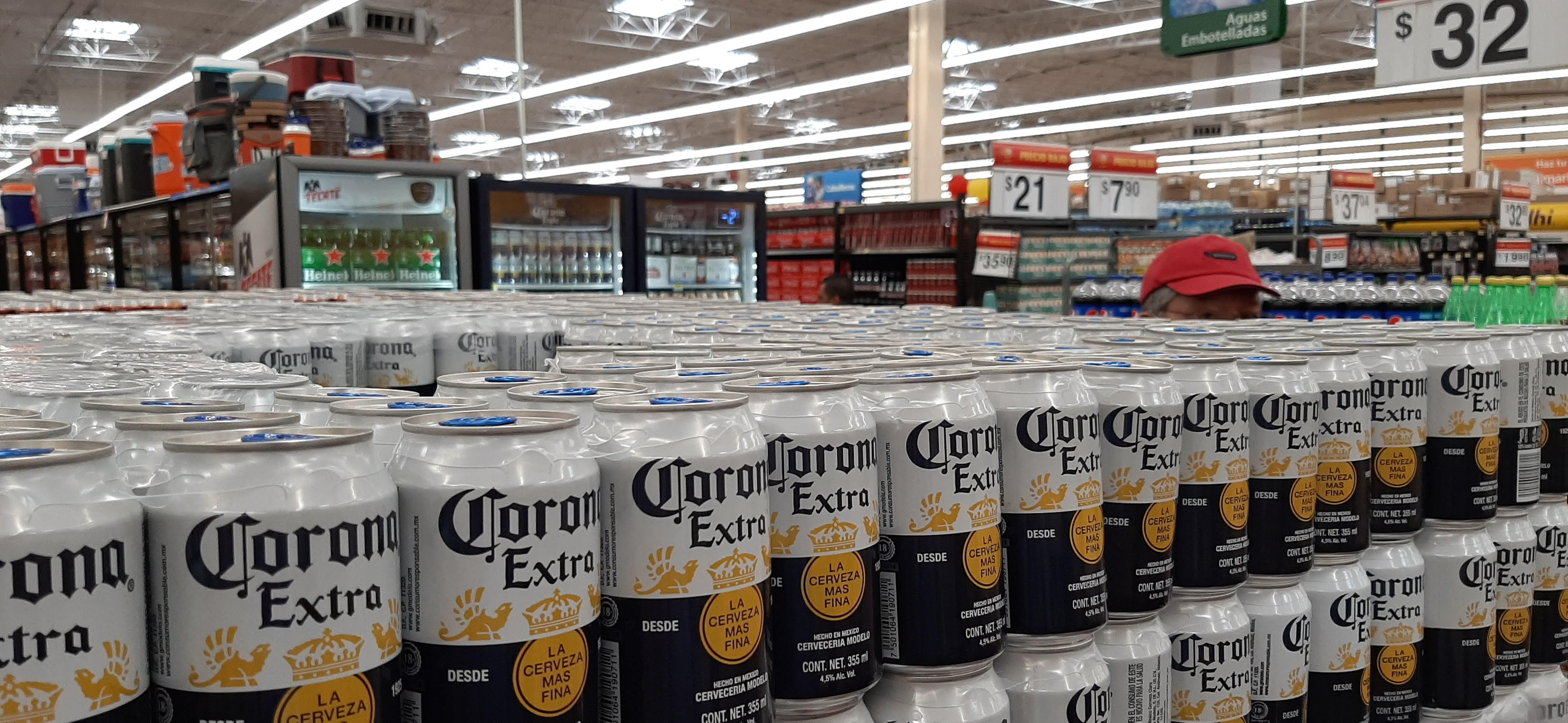
Cans of beer in a Mexican supermarket

However, competition soon forced the consolidation of the industry. Cervecería Cuauhtémoc in Monterrey first went national when it bought the Tecate brewery. Cervecería Toluca became Cervecería Modelo in 1925, and soon began buying smaller competitors. During the rest of the 20th century, larger companies bought out smaller companies, assuming their brands, until only two major producers were left, Cervecería Modelo (or Grupo Modelo) and Cervecería Cuauhtémoc-Moctezuma owned by FEMSA. Many smaller breweries, such as Cervecería Mexicali opened in 1920, which were not bought by these giants were forced to close. Most of the brands known today were creations made by the smaller breweries of the past that were absorbed into the stock of these two giants, who distribute these products in both Mexico and abroad. These producers have seventeen plants located in eleven states with a capacity of 46 million hectoliters annually and support 92 centers of barley production in Mexico. The industry employs 90,000 people and 800,000 jobs are related to it indirectly. The Mexican beer industry is one of the economy's most prolific with 63% of the domestic population consuming one or more of the brands, and Mexico ranks third in global exports of beer. In 2004, exports of beer were valued at US$1.2 billion. Domestic sales were $6 billion.

=== 21st century ===
Mexico displaced the Netherlands in 2003 as the largest worldwide beer exporter, selling 1.39 million tonnes, with sales, primarily to the U.S., continuing to increase. Grupo Modelo and FEMSA send more than 80% of their exports to the United States. Mexico's growth is coming largely at the expense of U.S. brands. The two main Mexican producers reported increases in export volume of 42% and 20.5% in 2006, compared to less than five percent for Anheuser-Busch and Molson Coors in the same year. Mexican beer has done so well in the United States that Miller SAB tried selling citrus and salt-flavored Miller Chill and Anheuser Busch attempted Bud Light Lime. The best-known and best-selling Mexican beer in the United States by far is Corona, produced by Grupo Modelo and distributed by Anheuser Busch. FEMSA entered the US market later, but has paired with Dutch enterprise Heineken USA to promote and distribute its brands, especially Dos Equis and Tecate. Some Mexican beers, such as Modelo Especial and Negra Modelo, are available in limited quantities on tap in cities such as New York, Houston, Raleigh and Phoenix.

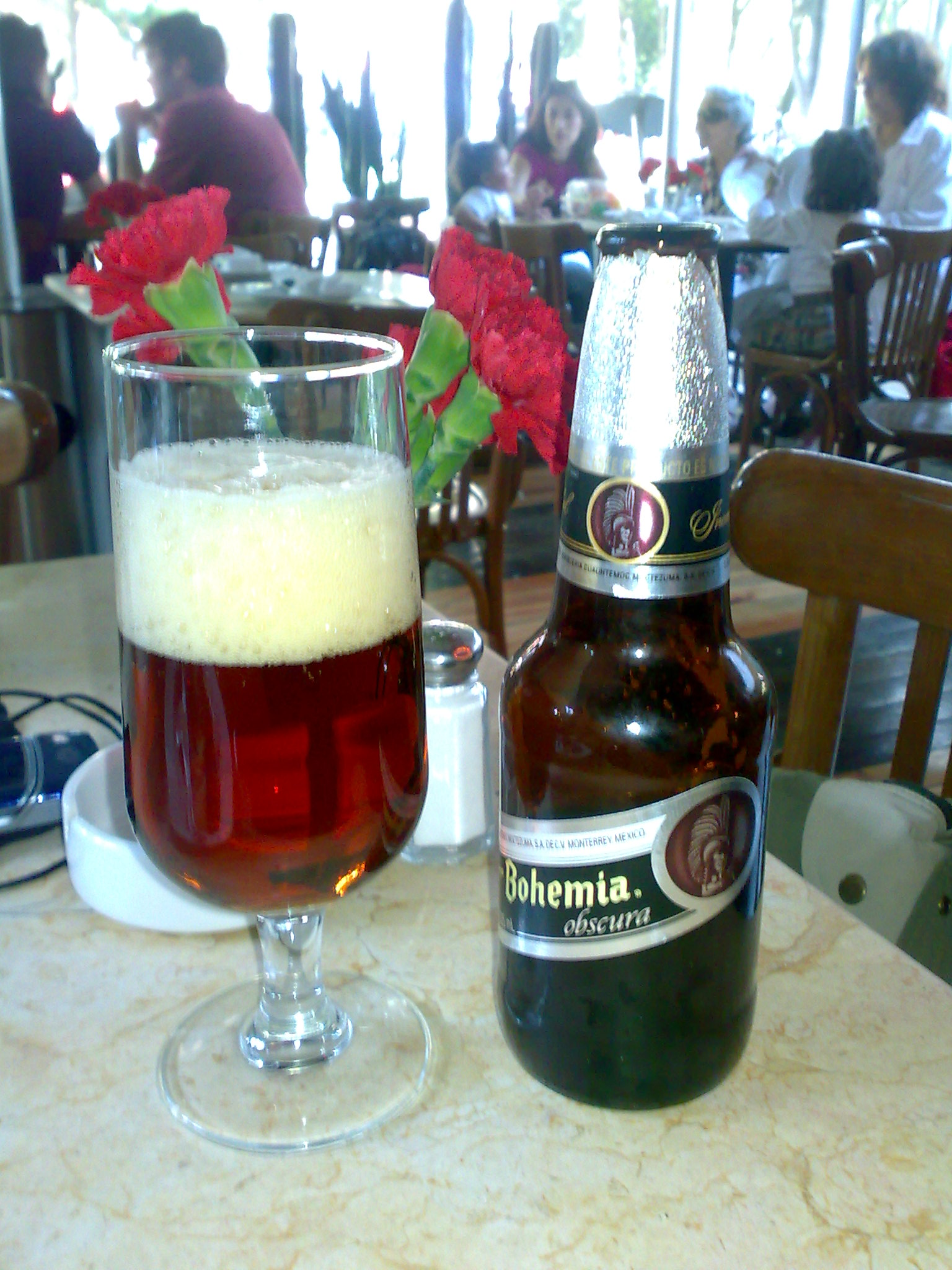
Bohemia dark version.

== Breweries and brands ==
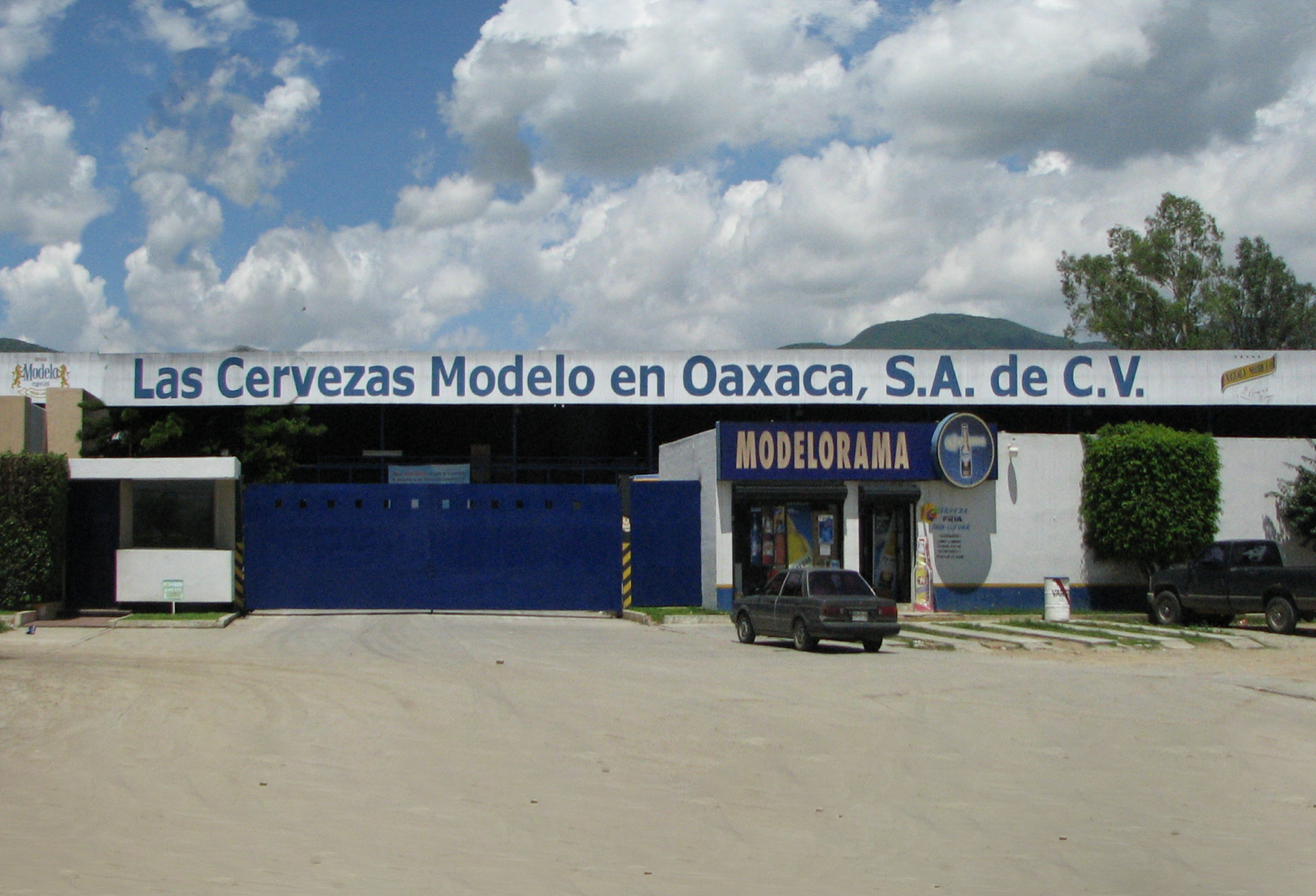
A Grupo Modelo distribution center in the state of Oaxaca.

In Mexico, beer is primarily produced by two large conglomerates, Cervecería Modelo/Grupo Modelo and Cervecería Cuauhtémoc-Moctezuma/FEMSA. Cervecería Modelo was founded in 1925 in Mexico City, with its first two brands, Modelo and Corona, exporting eight million bottles a year to various countries. First exports to the United States were realized as early as 1933. The first of the company's many acquisitions was the Cervecería Toluca y México, absorbing its Victoria and Pilsener brands in 1935. Modelo continued buying smaller local breweries in various parts of the country, absorbing most of the brands produced and making many of them available nationwide. Starting in the 1980s, the enterprise began new businesses, such as INAMEX, which produces malt, which led to the name change to Grupo Modelo. During the same period, the company began exports of Corona beer to the United States, becoming the second most imbibed imported beer there by 1986. Exports to other countries followed, and Corona became the number one premium imported beer in the United States in 1997. Half of Grupo Modelo's stock is owned by Anheuser Busch.

The beer-brewing division of FEMSA was created when this entity bought Cervecería Cuauhtémoc-Moctezuma, which itself was created when Cervecería Cuauhtémoc bought Cervecería Moctezuma. Cervecería Cuauhtémoc was founded in 1890 by Issac Garza, José Muguerza, Joseph M. Schnaider and Francisco Sada, selling their first beer, Carta Blanca. Cervecería Cuauhtémoc grew in size in Monterrey, and like Cervecería Modelo, went national as it began to buy smaller breweries in other parts of the country, absorbing many of the local brands and making them available nationally. The biggest acquisition was that of Cervecería Moctezuma in Orizaba in the 1980s. Cervecería Moctezuma started out as the Cervecería Guillermo Hasse y Compañia in 1893, and eventually changed its name to Cervecería Moctezuma. It was a major producer of beer since the early 20th century, and was one of the largest brewing companies in the world with the merger of the two, but the new company controls over twelve brand names. FEMSA bought the combined breweries to add to its other businesses, such as bottling and packaging enterprises.

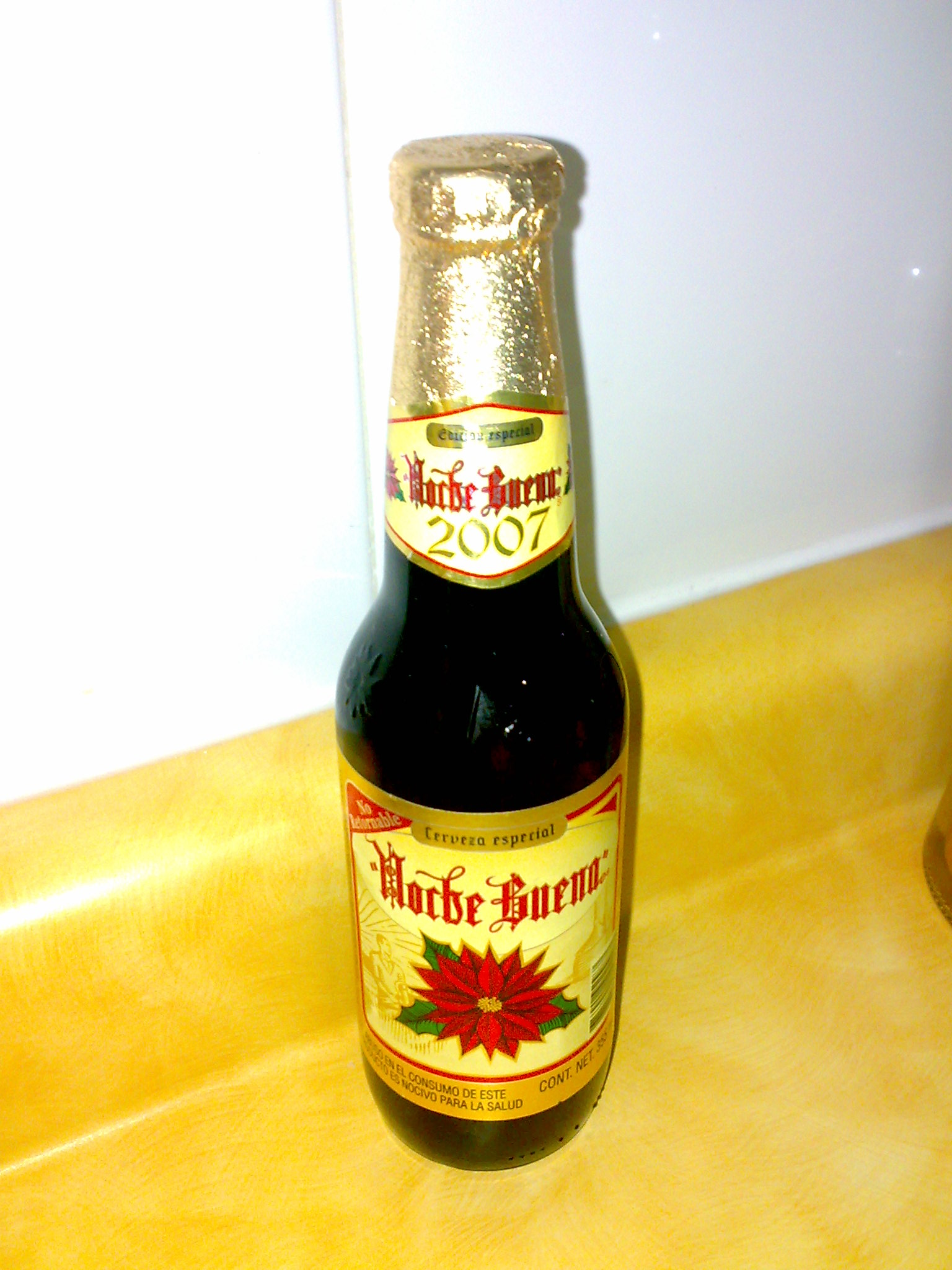
Noche Buena.

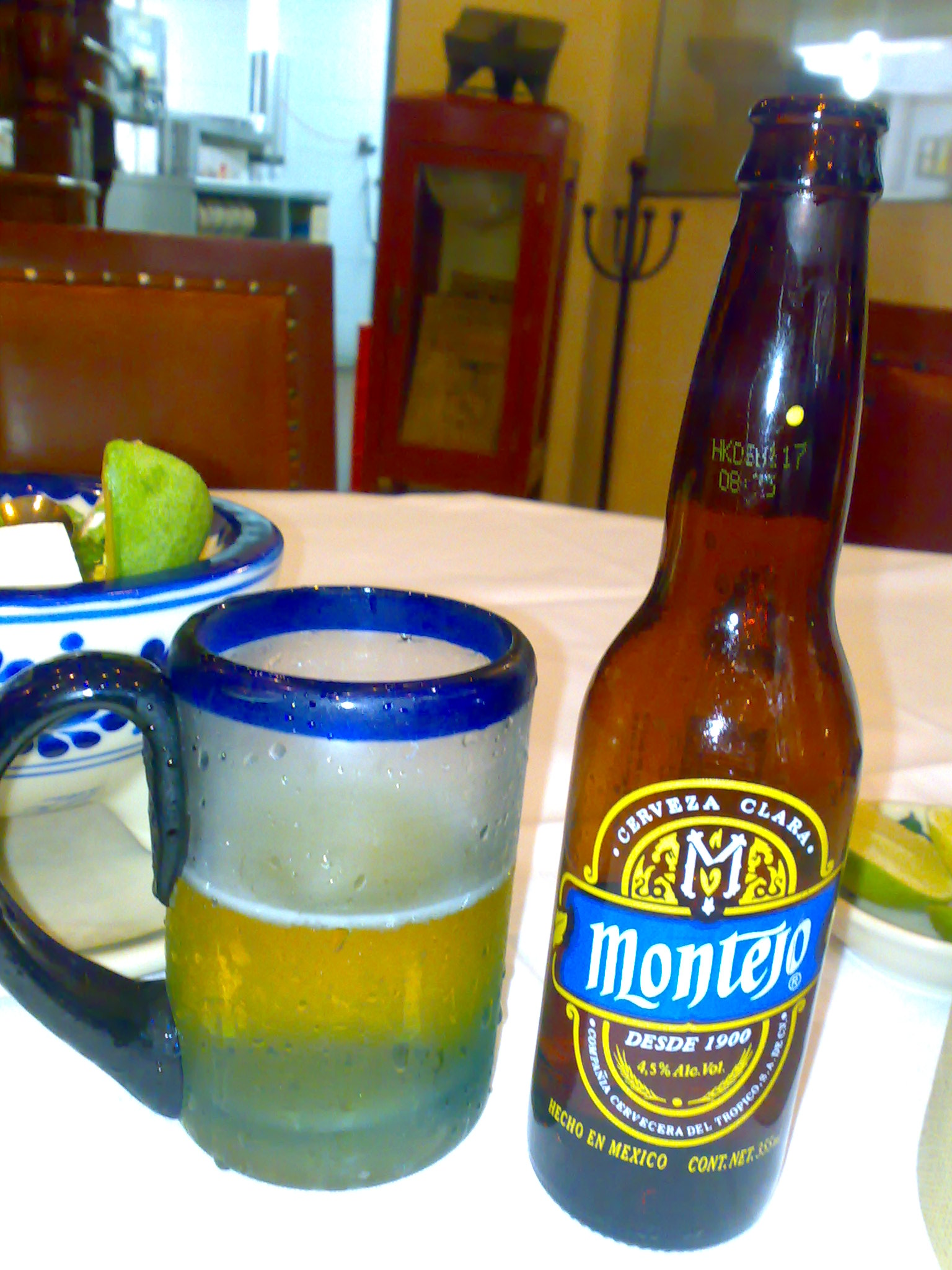
Montejo.

FEMSA's brands today include Tecate, Sol, Dos Equis, Carta Blanca, Superior, Indio, and Bohemia. Grupo Modelo's brands include Corona, Corona Light, Negra Modelo, Modelo Especial, Victoria, Estrella, Léon, Montejo, and Pacifico. Most of these beers are lagers brewed in large industrial plants, and made with minimal malt. Except for some dark beers, such as Dos Equis Ambar, León Negra, Negra Modelo, and Noche Buena, which are Vienna-style beers, almost all beer produced in Mexico is pilsner. Beers with top fermentation had been produced in Mexico. The Cervecería Toluca was founded in 1865 by a Swiss especially to produce this type of beer, but the introduction of Bohemian-style beers through the giant brewery Cuauhtémoc would define Mexican beer as pilsner.

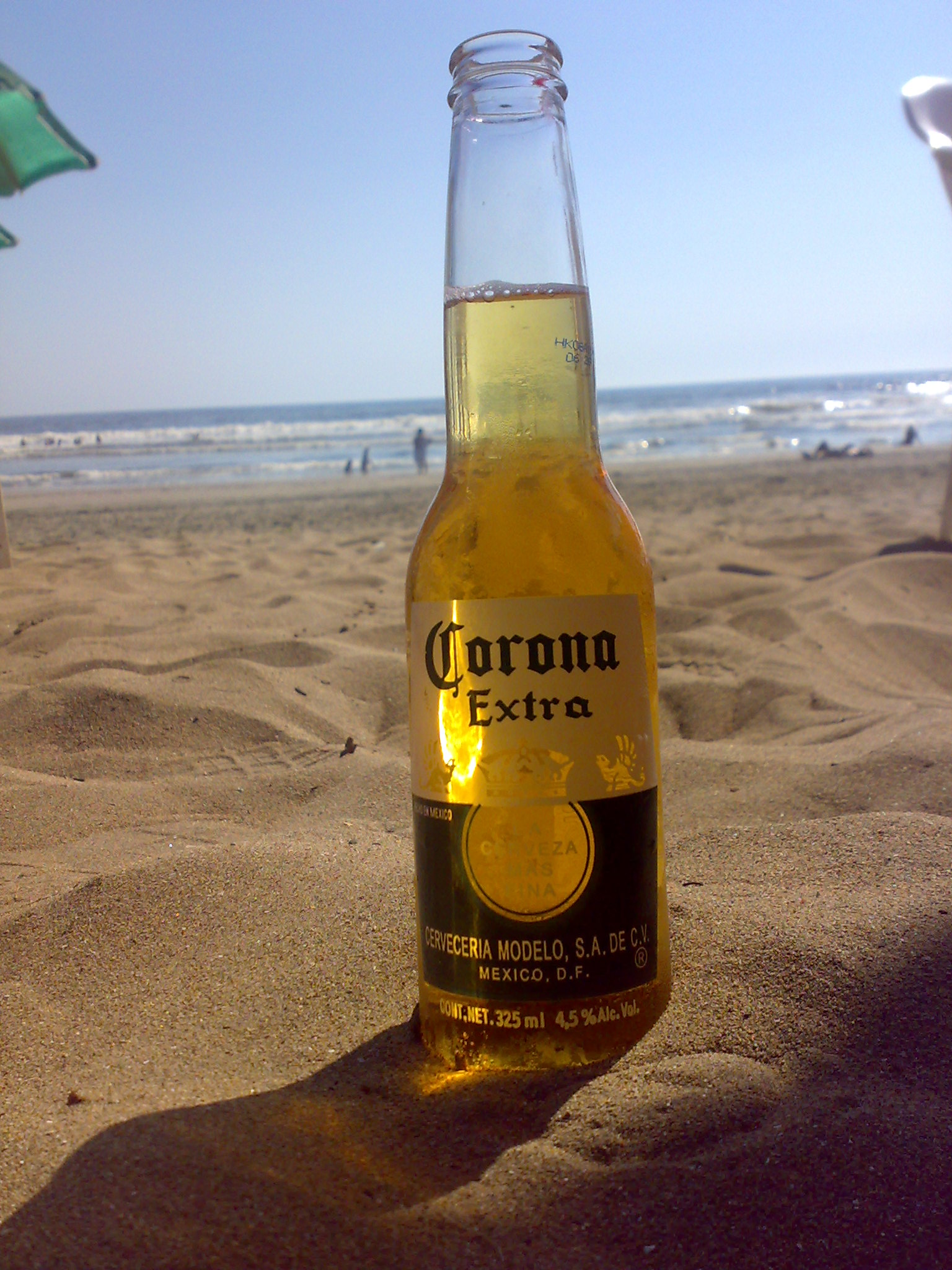
Corona.

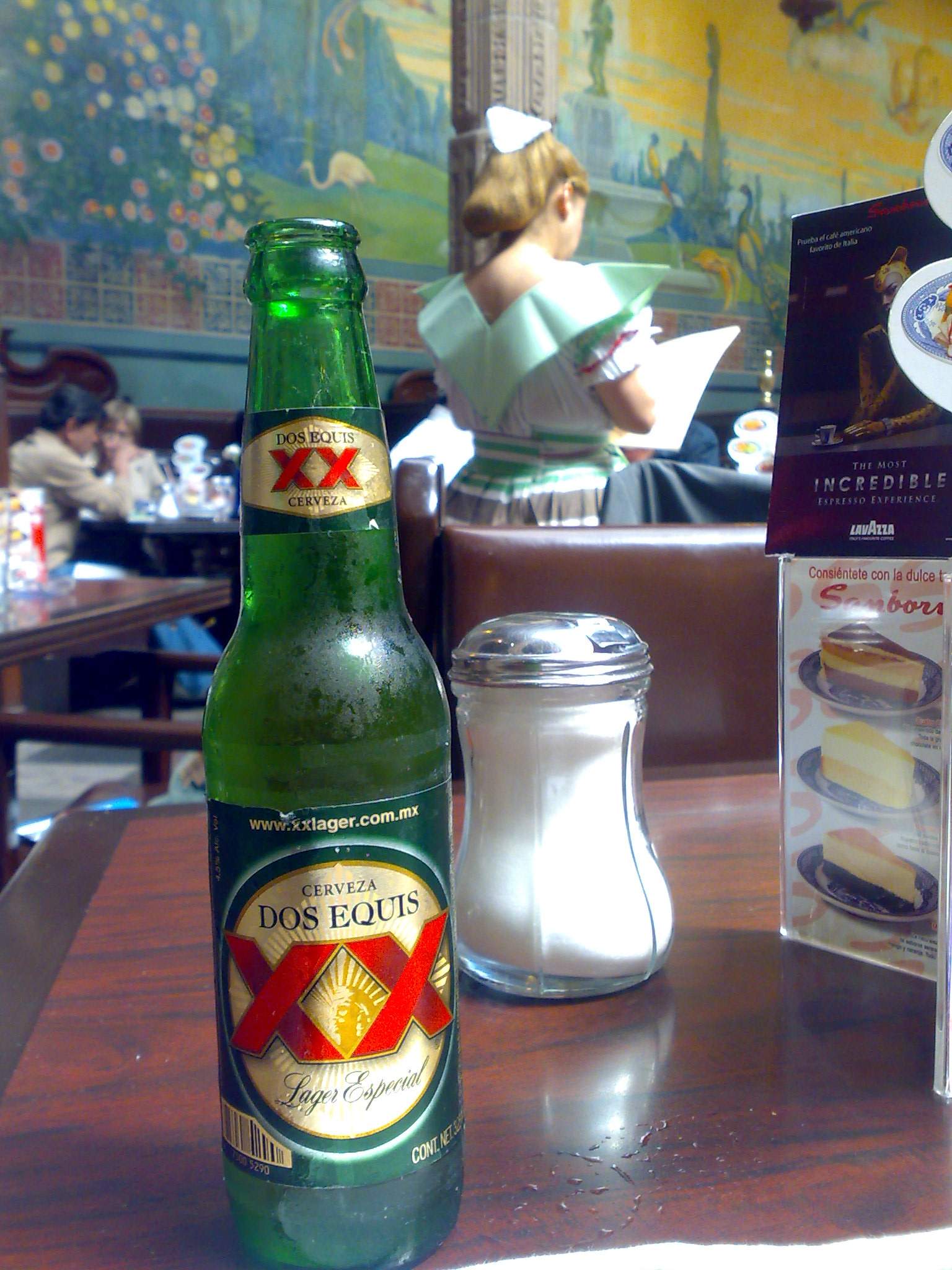
Dos Equis (XX).

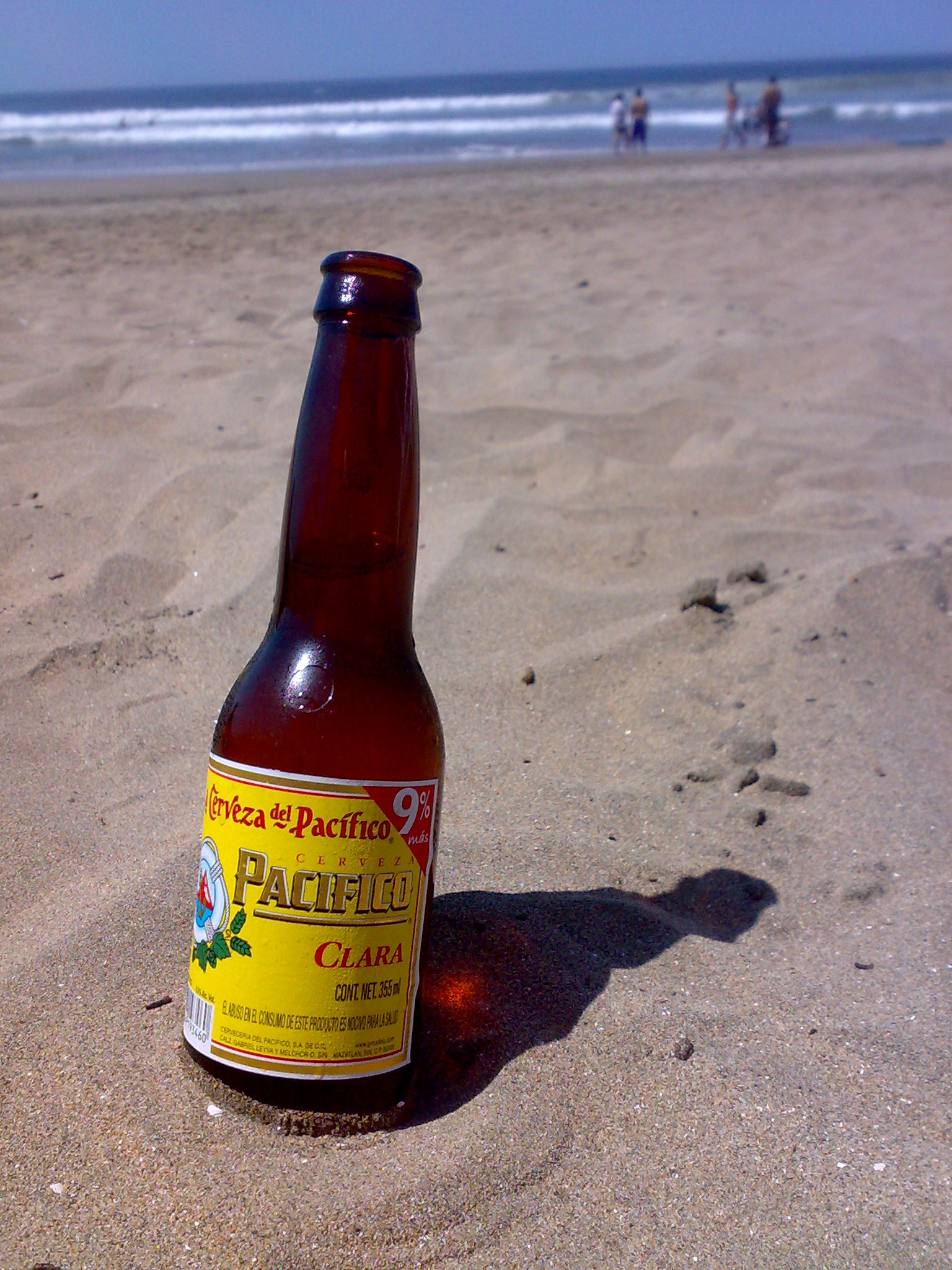
Pacífico.

Globally, one of the best known Mexican beers is Corona, which is the flagship beer of Grupo Modelo. Corona is the best-selling beer produced by Mexico, and the best-selling non-domestic beer in both the U.S., U.K and Australia. It is one of the five most-consumed beers in the world, available in more than 150 countries. It is a lager, and was created in 1925 to celebrate Cervecería Modelo's tenth anniversary. Corona is light straw in color and has a very mild flavor, with little hop bitterness and 4.6% alcohol by volume. It is produced by eight facilities with a total of 4.6 billion litres per year capacity. Corona beer is available in a variety of bottled presentations, ranging from the 250-ml ampolleta (labeled Coronita and just referred as the cuartito (little quarter)) up to the 940-ml Corona Familiar (known as the caguama (sea turtle) or ballena (whale)). Unlike most beers, Corona is bottled in a clear bottle, increasing the opportunity for spoilage from sunlight, which can affect the hop oils in the beer. A draught version also exists, as does canned Corona in some markets. The Corona brand trademark in the United States was initially owned by Puerto Rico's Cerveceria Corona, which eventually sold the trademark rights to Cerveceria Modelo.

The oldest and most traditional pilsner in Mexico is Bohemia, which has a significant hops flavor and is quite dense given its clarity. Bohemia has reached the respected distinction of being one of the finest beers of the world. The name comes from the Bohemia region in the Czech Republic that is known for beer. It is one of the longest-aged products from Cervecería Cuauhtémoc, and is the only one to use Lepa Styrian hops. There is a dark version of this brand, which is a Vienna-style beer. In 2009, the company introduced a wheat version of this beer called Bohemia Weizen made with wheat, Mount Hood hops, coriander and orange peel. It is the first wheat beer to be produced by a major beer company in Mexico. Dos Equis was first brewed in Mexico by the German brewer Wilhelm Hasse in 1897. The original name of the beer was "Siglo XX" (20th Century) with the double X standing for the number 20, and it commemorated the arrival of that century; the moniker "Dos Equis" (Double X) was originally just a nickname, but it became widely known by said nickname, as a result the "Siglo XX" name was dropped in favor of "Dos Equis" The original version is the Dos Equis Ambar, a Vienna-style dark beer. This was Cervecería Moctezuma's best selling beer in the 1940s and 1950s. Demand for the beer has resurged, especially in the United States, where it is now the best-selling imported dark beer. The clear version of this brand is a lager derived from the Ambar.

Sol was introduced in the 1890s as El Sol. The name (Spanish for The Sun or Sun) came from a ray of sunshine that fell on a pot while preparing the mash. After being off the market for many years, this brand was reintroduced in 1993, and is now exported to many countries in Latin America, Europe, Asia and Australia. It is a very light-coloured beer with little hops flavour, and considered to be a beer for the young people and the working class. Sol is known for its sexy advertising. Sol comes in a number of varieties. Sol 2 is a stronger flavored beer, Sol limón and sal have lime and salt flavors already added, and there is a Sol Cero, a nonalcoholic beer in regular and lime and salt versions.

Tecate was originally brewed by Cervecería Tecate, and is named after the city of Tecate, Baja California. The local brewery there was bought by Cuauhtémoc-Moctezuma in 1955. It was the first beer to be canned for retail sales in Mexico, with Tecate Light launched in Mexico in 1992. Tecate is one of the best-known brands in Mexico due to its patronage and sponsorship of Mexican sports teams and sporting events.

Noche Buena (literally Good Night, referring to Christmas Eve as the good night) is generally only available around Christmas. Many people wait for this beer's availability each year between the months of October and December. Noche Buena is a strong-flavored, dark beer named after the poinsettia plant or noche buena in Spanish, which decorates the beer's bottles and cartons.

Carta Blanca was Cervecería Cuauhtémoc's first premium beer, first marketed in 1890, and is technically a pilsner. The name means "white card" in Spanish, which at the time was given to people as a sign of respect. Carta Blanca was successful when it debuted at Chicago's Columbian Expo of 1893. Since then, the beer has won a number of other awards.

Negra Modelo is one of Cervecería Modelo's original beers, and was first sold as a draft in 1926. While it has been classed as a Vienna-style beer, the company's website now classifies it as a Munich dunkel (dark).

Pacífico, a Mexican pilsner beer originally brewed in Mazatlán, Sinaloa, is named after the Pacific Ocean. The picture on the bottles and cans is the Deer Islands located off the coast of Mazatlán surrounded by a lifesaver. Pacífico is Modelo's best-selling beer in northwest Mexico, and it is exported to the southwest U.S. A light version of this beer was launched in 2008.

Estrella (Star) was originally brewed by Cervecería Estrella of Guadalajara at the end of the 19th century. This brewery was bought by Grupo Modelo in 1954. The beer is still brewed only in Guadalajara and is a regional brand, mostly sold in Jalisco state and other areas in western Mexico.

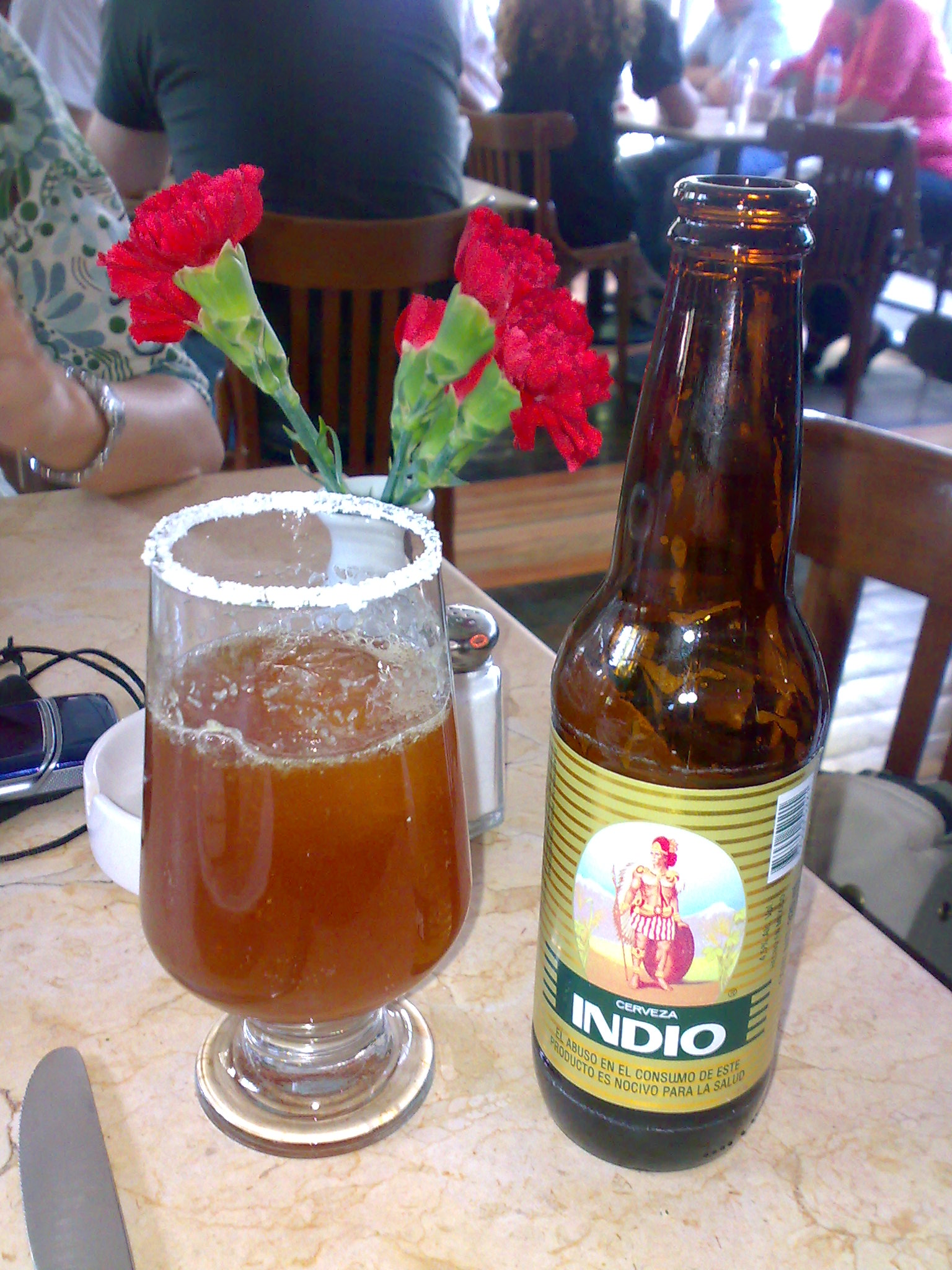
Michelada and Indio beer.

Indio was originally named Cuauhtémoc by Cervecería Cuauhtémoc. However, consumers soon began to refer to it as "Indian" for the image of an Indian on what was originally a clay bottle, now glass. The beer still has an image of Cuauhtémoc on the label.

Modelo Especial is Grupo Modelo's second brand after Corona, and was first brewed in 1925. It is a pilsner-style beer that is available in both bottle and cans since 1966. It is second in popularity in Mexico and the company's third best seller in the USA. A light version, called Modelo Light, has been available since 1994.

Superior, made by Cuauhtémoc Moctezuma, was originally brewed to be a premium beer. Recently, interest in this beer has reappeared, and it received a gold medal at the Monde Selection in Brussels, Belgium. The design of the label has not changed in the fifty years this brand has been available.

Victoria was first brewed by Cervecería Toluca y México starting in 1865, but Modelo acquired the brand when they bought this company in 1935. It is sold in bottles, both the standard 325 ml and the large 950ml. The beer is a Vienna-style, but is an amber color and lighter than the other Vienna beers brewed in Mexico.

León, Carta Clara and Montejo brands were originally brewed in Mérida, Yucatán by the Cervecería Yucateca, which was bought by Modelo in 1979. León is a Munich-style dark beer, which was initially brewed at the beginning of the 20th century in the southeast of the country. Montejo was first introduced in 1960 to celebrate the 60th anniversary of the Yucateca brewery. This brewery was bought by Grupo Modelo in 1979, and the packaging was changed to the current one in 1999.

== Microbreweries ==
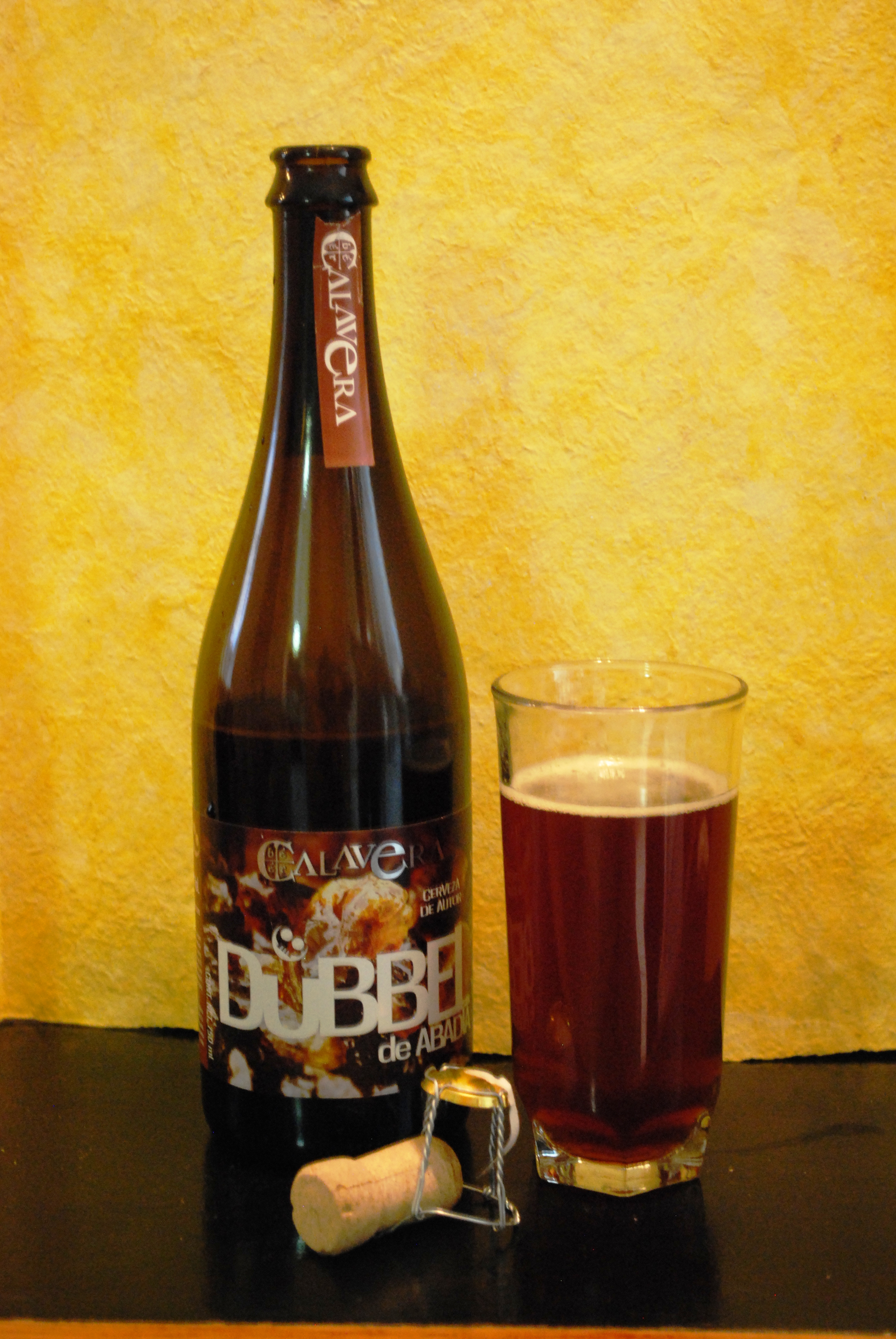
Calavera brand beer with served portion and the cork from the bottle.

Microbrews are a new and still rare phenomenon in Mexico, especially compared to countries such as the U.S., Canada and those in Europe, but they do exist. The first was established in the 1990s in Mazatlán and called Pepe's y Joe's. Later in the decade, others, such as Cervecería San Ángel and Cervecería Santa Fe Beer Factory, appeared in Mexico City.

== Commemorative beers ==
In addition to microbrews, some enterprises have introduced niche brands based more on name or marketing, rather than on brewing style. One company by the name of Minerva, based in Guadalajara, introduced a beer named "Malverde" after the supposed "saint" of drug traffickers, Jesús Malverde. The beer was first introduced in Culiacán, Sinaloa. It is also available in Guadalajara. This same company had earlier launched "Duff" beer, modeled after the beer on the television show "The Simpsons" but ran into copyright issues. More recently, group of Mexican businessmen introduced a beer called "10 Maradó," which is named in honor of Diego Maradona. This beer is the first in a series dedicated to various football/soccer legends and teams which the enterprise called "La Liga Cervecera" (The Beer League). The beer was introduced at the II Festival de Cerveza de Guadalajara and according to its producers is "light, with body and with a flavor similar to the most premium beers of Argentina." Maradona's face does not appear on the label, only the word Maradó and the number 10, with a background of blue and white stripes. This same group created the company Cervecería Revolución with beers dedicated to Che Guevara, Maquiavelo and Emiliano Zapata.

== Beer drinking habits ==
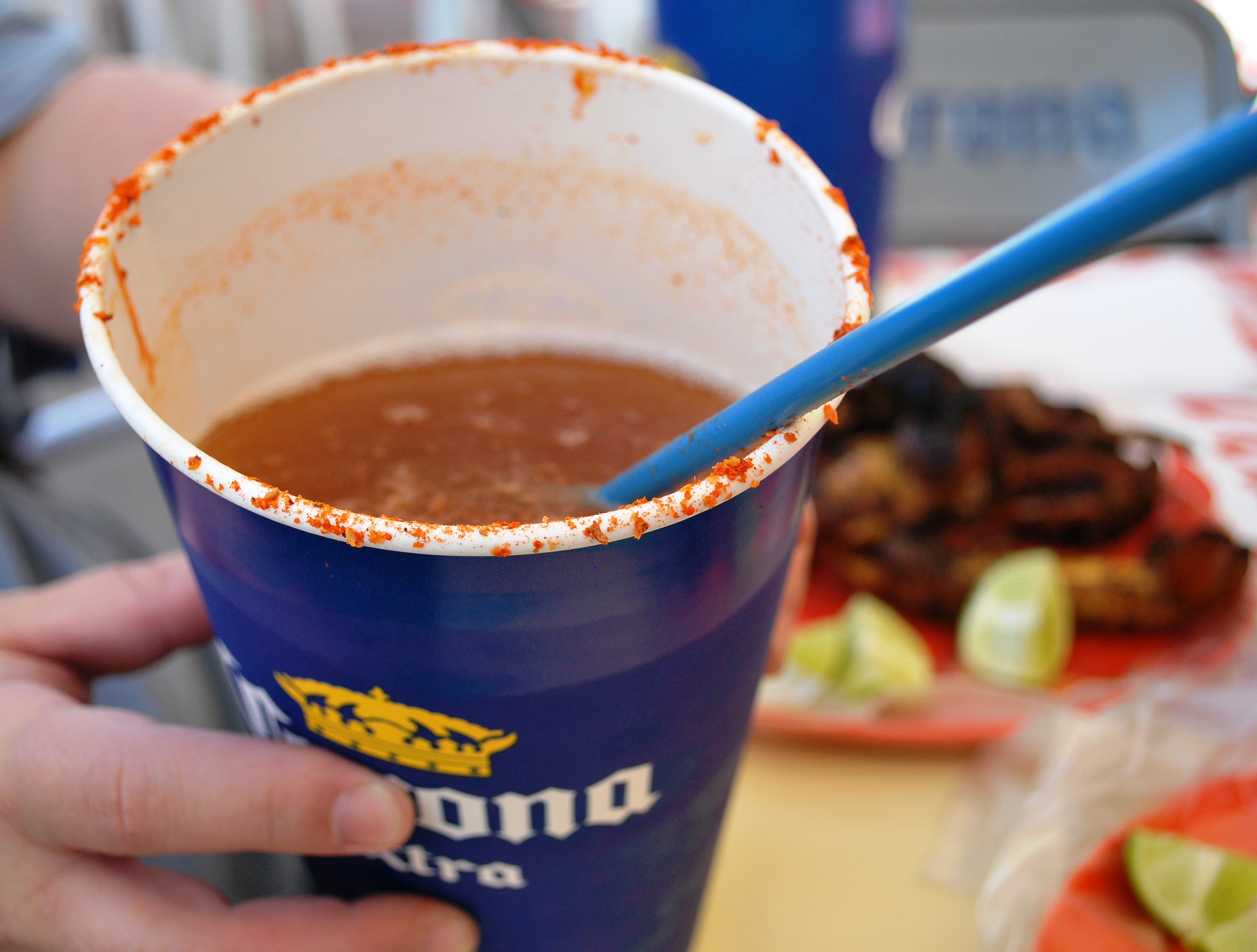
Michelada with lime, salt and chili pepper.

Mexican beer is distinctive for its lager-like properties, being generally light-bodied with a mild taste and is meant to be consumed cold. Most beer is sold in 325 ml bottles called "medias" in the popular slang, with certain brands, such as Tecate and Modelo Especial often sold in cans. In Mexico, most bottled beer is sold in returnable bottles, the deposit for which can be almost the price of the beer itself. but certain brands, such as Corona and Victoria, are available in large bottles of 925 or 940ml. The slang term for these is caguamas (sea turtles) or in some parts, like Mazatlán, ballenas (whales), but usually referring to the Pacifico brand. This type of bottle was first introduced in Mexico in 1960 along with the six-pack, often referred to in Mexico as a "six". Very little beer in Mexico is served on tap.

In Mexico, beer is commonly served with lime juice.

A beer cocktail called a michelada consists of light beer with lime juice, salt, and sometimes chili powder, Worcestershire sauce, soy sauce or tomato juice. As with a margarita, the salt is generally placed on the rim of glass. A less common version of the drink adds Clamato (clam/tomato juice). The name michelada comes from the phrase mi chela helada (my beer, ice cold). In many places also are found variants which include shrimp or seafood, pineapple and so on.

While many trends in the United States have become popular in Mexico, beer on tap has not. Another trend that has not proven successful in Mexico is that of light beer. Despite Corona Light being the best-selling imported light beer in the United States, sales of Corona Light in Mexico have been dismal. Grupo Modelo introduced the product after having success with exports. The beer was introduced with television ads and featured in two-for-one specials at many bars. However, light beer is generally not favored in Mexico, with the exception of Tecate Light in the north. With poor sales, Corona Light is rarely found in Mexico other than a few select places.

== See also ==
- Beer and breweries by region
- Mexican cuisine
- Mexican wine
- Mezcal
- Pulque
- Tequila
