= Beer in Cyprus =

Beer in Cyprus has a rich history in Cyprus where it has been brewed for thousands of years. As a beer brewing country, it is largely known for its popular lager style beer, with the most popular brand being KEO beer. However, there is a growing number of local breweries and a diverse range of beer styles, catering to a rise in demand from both locals and tourists.

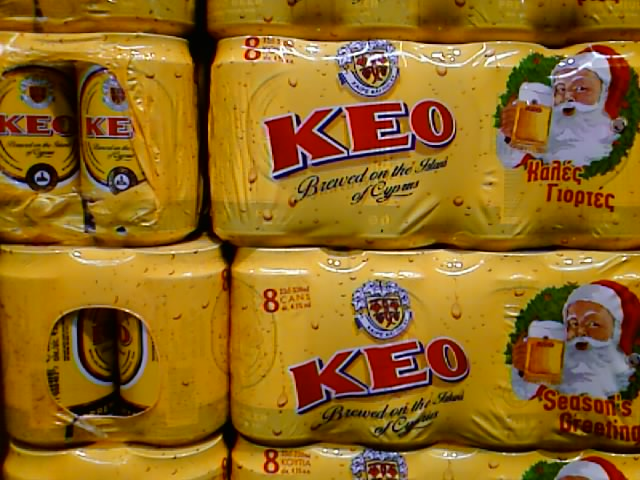

In 2021, the annual volume of beer consumed per capita in Cyprus amounted to 47 liters.

== History ==
=== Ancient ===
Beer has been brewed in Cyprus for millennia, with evidence of beer production dating back to the Bronze Age. Archeological excavations have uncovered pottery vessels and brewing tools used by the ancient Cypriots to brew beer. These findings suggest that beer was an integral part of the daily life and culture of ancient Cyprus.

One of the earliest references to beer in Cyprus can be found in the ancient city of Kition, now known as Larnaca. Inscriptions on clay tablets, dating back to the 13th century BCE, mention a local brewery that produced beer for both local consumption and export to neighboring regions. This indicates that beer was not only a popular beverage among the ancient Cypriots but also a traded commodity. The production of beer in ancient Cyprus was likely done using rudimentary techniques, such as fermenting grains, mainly barley and wheat, in water and allowing the mixture to ferment naturally. The resulting brew would have been a simple, unfiltered beer with a relatively low alcohol content compared to modern beers.

=== Ottoman Era and British Influence ===
In the 16th century, Cyprus came under Ottoman rule, which had a significant impact on beer production on the island. The Ottoman Empire, a Muslim state, had strict regulations on the production and consumption of alcoholic beverages, including beer. As a result, beer production in Cyprus declined, and the focus shifted towards other agricultural products.

However, with the arrival of British rule in the late 19th century, the brewing industry in Cyprus saw a resurgence. The British, who had a strong beer-drinking culture, established breweries on the island to cater to the needs of their troops stationed in Cyprus. These breweries produced beer using modern brewing techniques and equipment, and the production was mainly aimed at satisfying the demand of the British military personnel.

One of the notable breweries established during the British era was the Cyprus Brewery, which was founded in 1937 and became a leading brewery in Cyprus.

== Craft Beer Revolution ==
In recent years, there has been a craft beer revolution taking place in Cyprus, mirroring the global increase in craft breweries. Craft breweries, also known as microbreweries, are small-scale breweries that produce limited quantities of beer using traditional brewing techniques, often with locally sourced ingredients. These breweries offer unique and innovative beer styles that cater to the evolving tastes and preferences of beer drinkers.

Cyprus has witnessed the emergence of several local craft breweries that have been gaining popularity among beer enthusiasts. These breweries, such as the Aphrodite's Rock Brewing Company, the Pivo Microbrewery, and Lofou Microbrewery, have been pushing the boundaries of traditional beer styles and experimenting with local ingredients, such as carob, honey, and citrus fruits, to create distinctive and flavourful brews. These craft breweries have also been actively promoting the culture of beer through educational events, tastings, and collaborations, fostering a sense of community among beer enthusiasts in Cyprus.

Beer has become more than just a beverage in modern Cypriot society; it has also taken on cultural significance. Beer festivals and events have become a popular part of the social calendar in Cyprus, where locals and tourists alike come together to celebrate the art of brewing and enjoy a variety of beer styles. These events provide a platform for local breweries to showcase their products, promote the culture of beer, and foster a sense of community among beer lovers.

== See also ==
- Cyprus Wine
- KEO (beer)
- Leon Beer
