= Carta Clara =

Mexican beer brand

- Company type: Beer
- Industry: Food and beverage
- Founded: 1900
- Headquarters: Yucatan
- Products: Beer

Carta Clara is a Mexican beer brand, originally produced in the state of Yucatan, manufactured by "Cerveceria Yucateca", a local brewery. The beer was owned by Nestor Rubio Apulche, since 1900. In 2021, Grupo Modelo relaunched the iconic Mexican beer.

== History ==
"Cerveceria Yucateca" was opened in 1886 by brewer Jose Maria Ponce. The company produced other beer brands, such as Leon and Leon Negra (not to be confused with Leon Beer). In 1900, Rubio Apulche became an associate, and production of Carta Clara began.

== Legacy ==
Although Carta Clara was not produced for a very long time until Grupo Modelo relaunched it during 2021, its legacy remained around the state of Yucatan: Estadio Carta Clara, also known as Parque Carta Clara, remained open from 1954 to 1981 and was home to a baseball team, the Leones de Yucatan. Meanwhile, the Centro de Espectaculos Carta Clara, also known as Jardin de Espectaculos Carta Clara or simply, as Jardin Carta Clara in Merida, remains open for public events.
