= Pacífico (beer) =

Mexican pilsner beer

Cerveza Pacífico Clara
- Type: Beer
- Manufacturer: Grupo Modelo
- Origin: Mexico
- Introduced: 1899
- Alcohol by volume: 4.4%
- Color: Clear

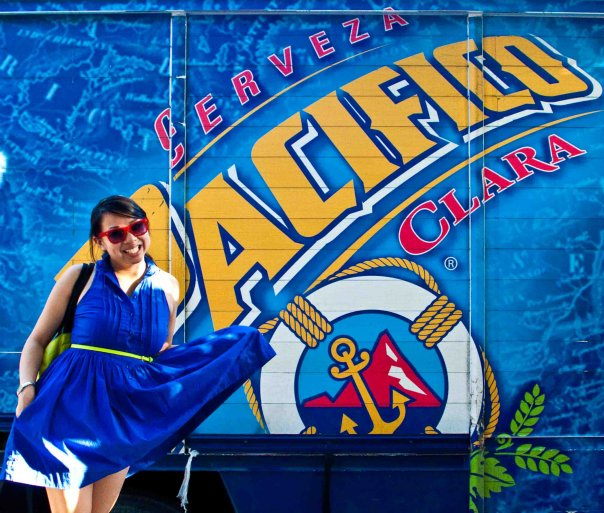
Advertising campaign for Pacifico Clara

Cerveza Pacífico Clara, better known as Pacífico, is a Mexican pilsner-style beer brewed in the Pacific Ocean port city of Mazatlán, in the state of Sinaloa, México.

== History ==
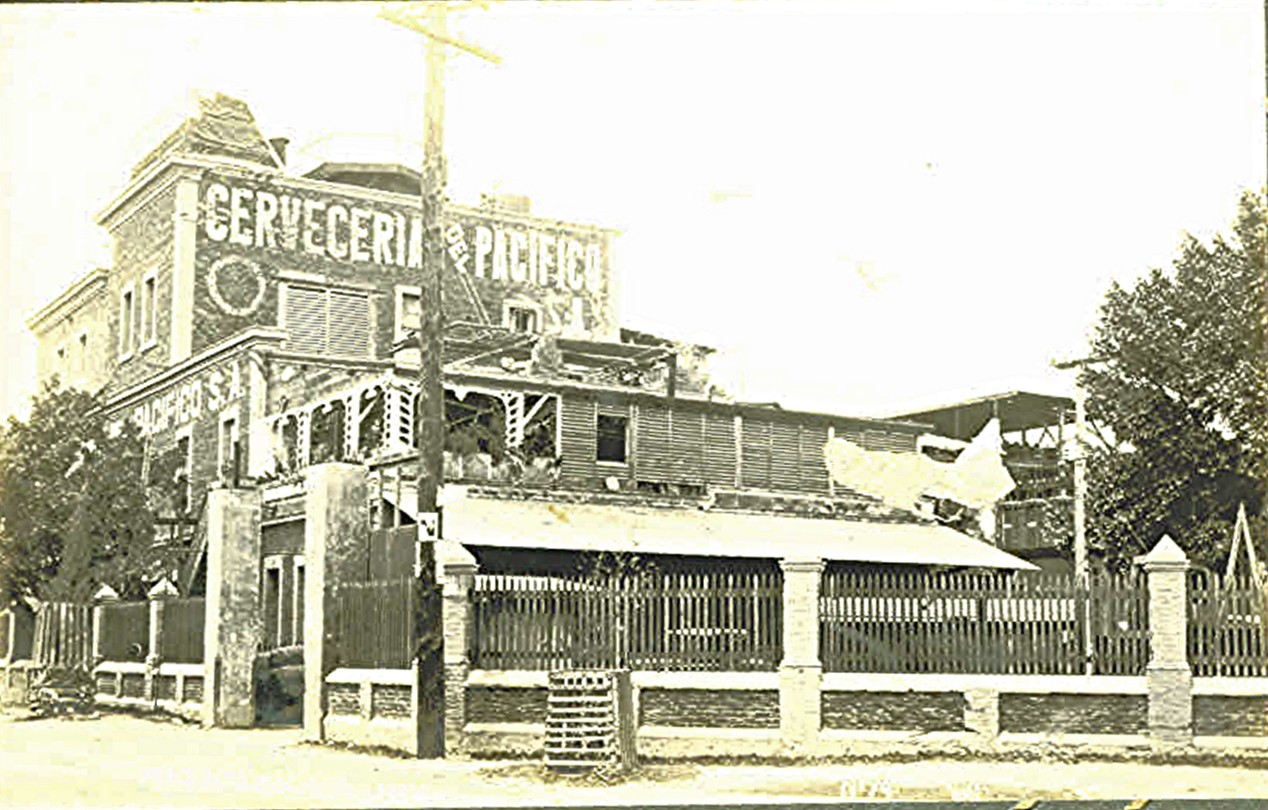
Cerveceria del Pacífico in Mazatlán

It was first brewed in 1900 when three Germans, Jorge Claussen, Germán Evers and Emilio Radostits opened a brewery, the Cerveceria del Pacífico, in Mazatlán. Its label includes a picture depicting a lifesaver encircling a ship's anchor superimposed over the port's lighthouse hill, known locally as "Cerro del Crestón." In Mazatlán, the beer is available in three different size bottles: "cuartitos" (180 ml; 6 US fl oz), "medias" (350 ml; 12 US fl oz), and "ballenas" (950 ml; 32 US fl oz).

Alcohol content: 4.4 percent. "Clara" means clear, blonde, as opposed to "oscura" (dark).

The Pacífico brewery was bought by Mexican brewing giant Grupo Modelo in 1954, which was later acquired by the Belgian-Brazilian Anheuser-Busch InBev company in 2013. To satisfy the United States Department of Justice's antitrust concerns, Anheuser-Busch InBev transferred all United States distribution rights to Pacífico and Grupo Modelo's other brands to Constellation Brands.

== See also ==
- Beer in Mexico
