= Corona (beer) =

Mexican beer brand

Corona Extra
- Type: Beer
- Manufacturer: AB InBev; Constellation Brands (US license)
- Origin: Mexico
- Introduced: 1925; 101 years ago
- Alcohol by volume: 4.5%
- Style: Pale lager
- Website: corona.com

Corona is a Mexican brand of beer produced by Grupo Modelo in Mexico. It is brewed, exported, and distributed globally by Grupo Modelo's parent company AB InBev. In the United States and Guam, Constellation Brands is the exclusive licensee and sole importer distributor of Corona. The beer is also brewed in China for the Australasia market. It is one of the top-selling brands of imported beer in the United States. It is often served with a wedge of lime or lemon in the neck of the bottle to add tartness and flavor. The recipe for the mash bill includes corn as well as the barley malt and hops traditionally used for making beer.

The brand's most popular variation is Corona Extra, a pale lager. It is one of the top-selling beers worldwide, and Corona Extra has been the top-selling imported drink in the U.S. since 1998. Other variants of the Corona beer brand include Corona Light, Corona Premier, and Corona Familiar. A variety of flavored hard seltzers marketed under the Corona brand name was launched in March 2020.

== History ==
In July 1922 German immigrant and brewmaster, Adolph H. Schmedtje joined Cerveceria Modelo Sociedad Anónima (S.A.) to oversee production and created the Corona brew. Corona was officially introduced in 1925. In 1932 Cerveceria Modelo S.A. changed ownership and after a period of acquisition consolidated into Grupo Modelo. With the reduction of tariffs on the import of Mexican beer to the United States when NAFTA came into effect in 1994, along with an increase in immigration between the two countries, Corona grew in popularity in the United States.

In 2013, Anheuser-Busch InBev acquired full control of Grupo Modelo. To satisfy the United States Department of Justice's antitrust concerns, Anheuser-Busch InBev transferred all United States distribution rights to Corona and Grupo Modelo's other brands to Constellation Brands.

== Ingredients ==
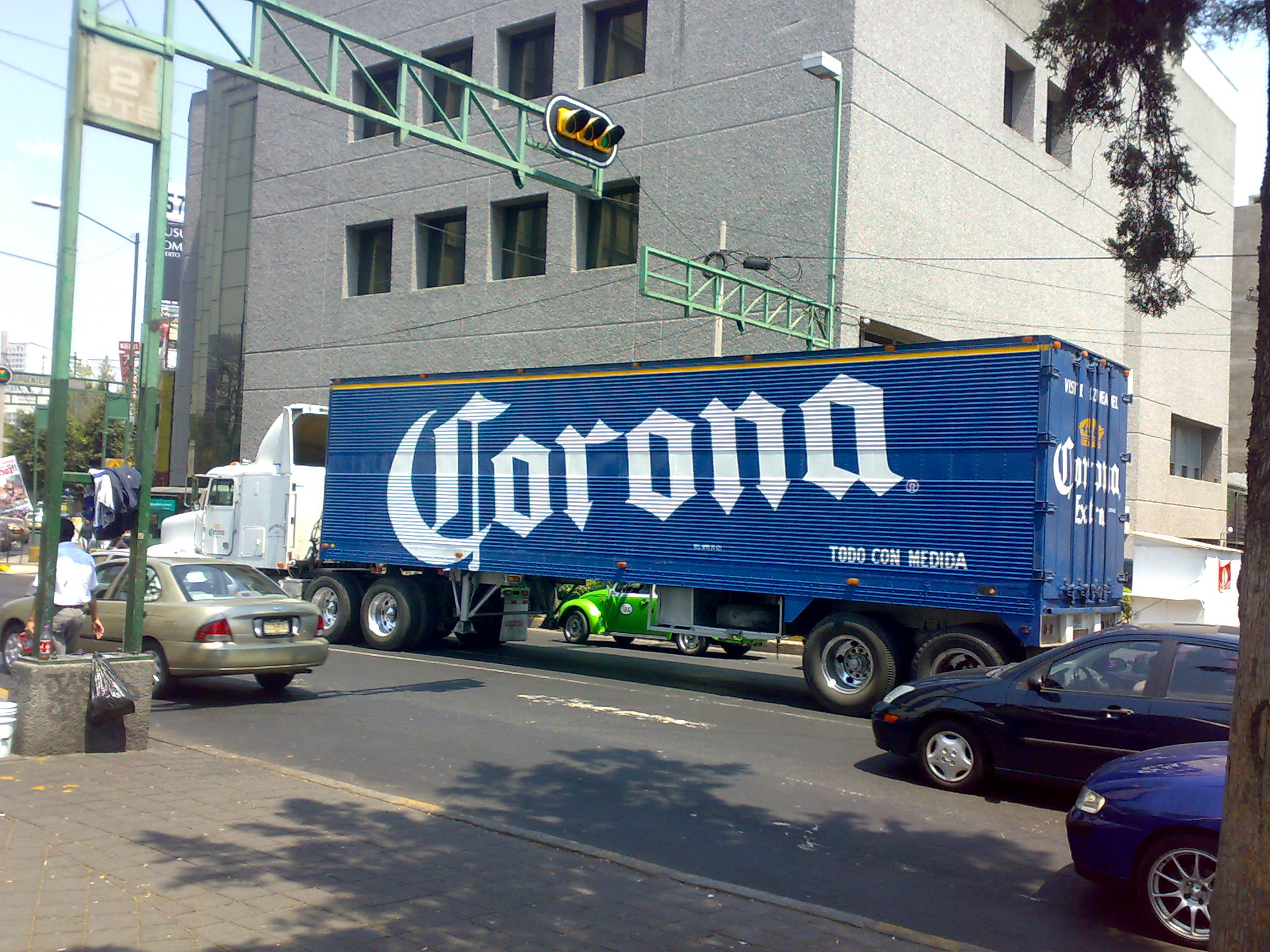
A truck in Mexico decorated with the Corona brand name

According to Sinebrychoff, a Finnish company owned by the Carlsberg Group, Corona Extra contains barley malt, corn, hops, yeast, antioxidants (ascorbic acid), and propylene glycol alginate as a stabilizer.

== Packaging ==
The label and logo of Corona was designed by Eduardo Cataño working under the advertising company Galas de México for Grupo Modelo brewery, around 1935.

Corona beer is available in a variety of bottle presentations, ranging from the 207 ml (7.0 U.S. fl oz; 7.3 imp fl oz) ampolleta (labeled Coronita and just referred as the cuartito) up to the 940 ml (31.8 U.S. fl oz; 33.1 imp fl oz) Corona Familiar (known as the familiar, Litro or Mega). A draught version also exists, as does canned Corona in some markets.

Since the 80s, Corona had been branded as Coronita (literally, 'little crown') in Spain, as winemaker Bodegas Torres had owned the trademark for "Coronas" since 1907. The packaging was otherwise the same in Spain as in Mexico and the United States. AB InBev resolved the branding issues with Torres in 2016, with the beer starting to be sold as Corona in Spain from June of that year. In Mexico, the United Kingdom, Canada, Australia, and the United States, smaller, 210 mL (7.4 imp fl oz) bottles of the beer are also branded as "Coronita".

== Sponsorship partners ==
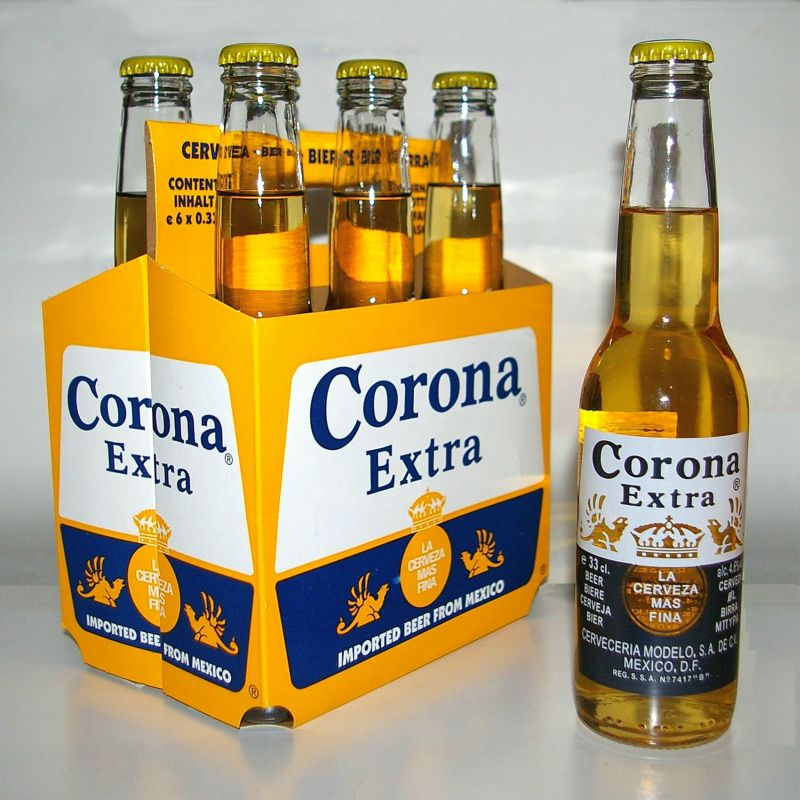
Corona 6-pack, showing a 33-cl = 330 ml (11.2 U.S. fl oz; 11.6 imp fl oz) bottle and carton that is marked 6 × 0.33 L (partially visible). This bottle features eight languages for export to the Common Market.

Corona was a longtime sponsor of boxing in Mexico, then the United States in the cable age, including sponsorship of Saturday night fights on Televisa, but reduced its sponsorship after Anheuser-Busch InBev took full control of the brand. In the United States, Constellation Brands continues to sponsor boxing through Corona, most notably with undefeated featherweight champion Floyd Mayweather Jr.

Corona was the title sponsor of the LPGA Tour tournament Corona Championship (later Tres Marias Championship) from 2005 to 2009, and of the NASCAR Mexico Corona Series (now NASCAR PEAK Mexico Series) from 2004 to 2011, the most followed stock car racing series in Mexico.

In addition, Corona is a "second sponsor" for four of the top-flight professional football teams of Mexico's first division, Liga MX. The teams sponsored by Corona are Santos Laguna, América, Toluca, and Mazatlán. Corona has sponsored the Mexico national football team since 2003, and has signed a contract to do so until 2026.

Corona and the Association of Tennis Professionals (ATP) had a 5½–year sponsorship in which Corona was the ATP's premier worldwide sponsor. Corona was also the title sponsor of the SBK Superbike World Championship from 1998 until 2007.

== Advertising ==
Corona refers to itself as "La cerveza más fina."

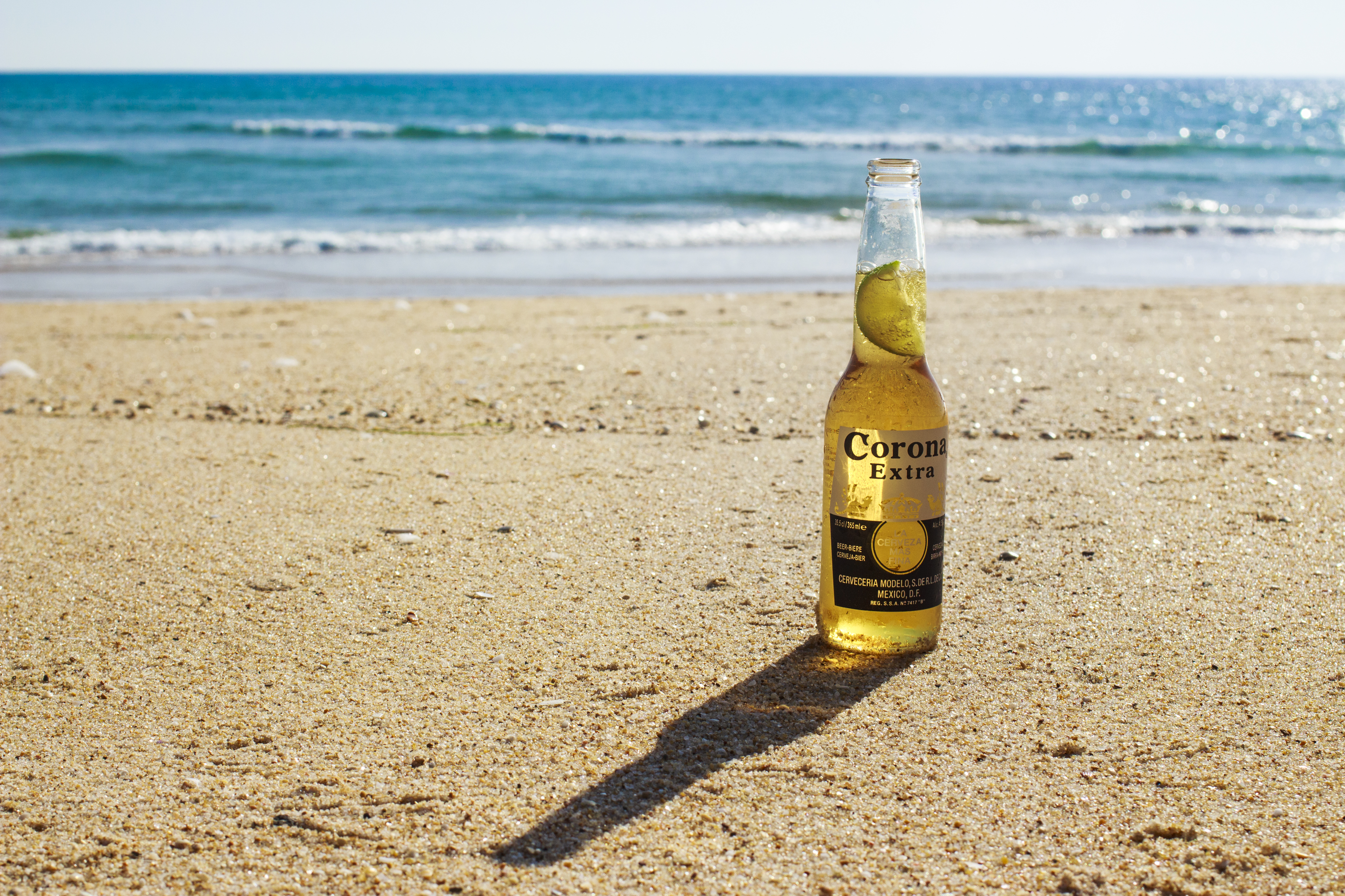
Corona bottle with a lime slice

Corona commercials for both Corona Extra and Corona Light typically take place on a beach with the tagline "Miles Away From Ordinary" from 2000 to 2007. Since the early 2010s, the tagline "Find Your Beach" was used.

In 1990, Corona introduced a Christmas-themed commercial called "O Tannenpalm". It features a whistling rendition of the popular Christmas song "O Tannenbaum" as a palm tree lights up with Christmas lights, with the caption "Feliz Navidad" (Merry Christmas). "O Tannenpalm", the longest-running beer ad, has aired every year during the month of December.

== Use in cocktails ==
Some bars and restaurants serve a "Coronarita", a beer cocktail that consists of a bottle of Corona upturned to drain into a margarita.

== COVID-19 pandemic ==
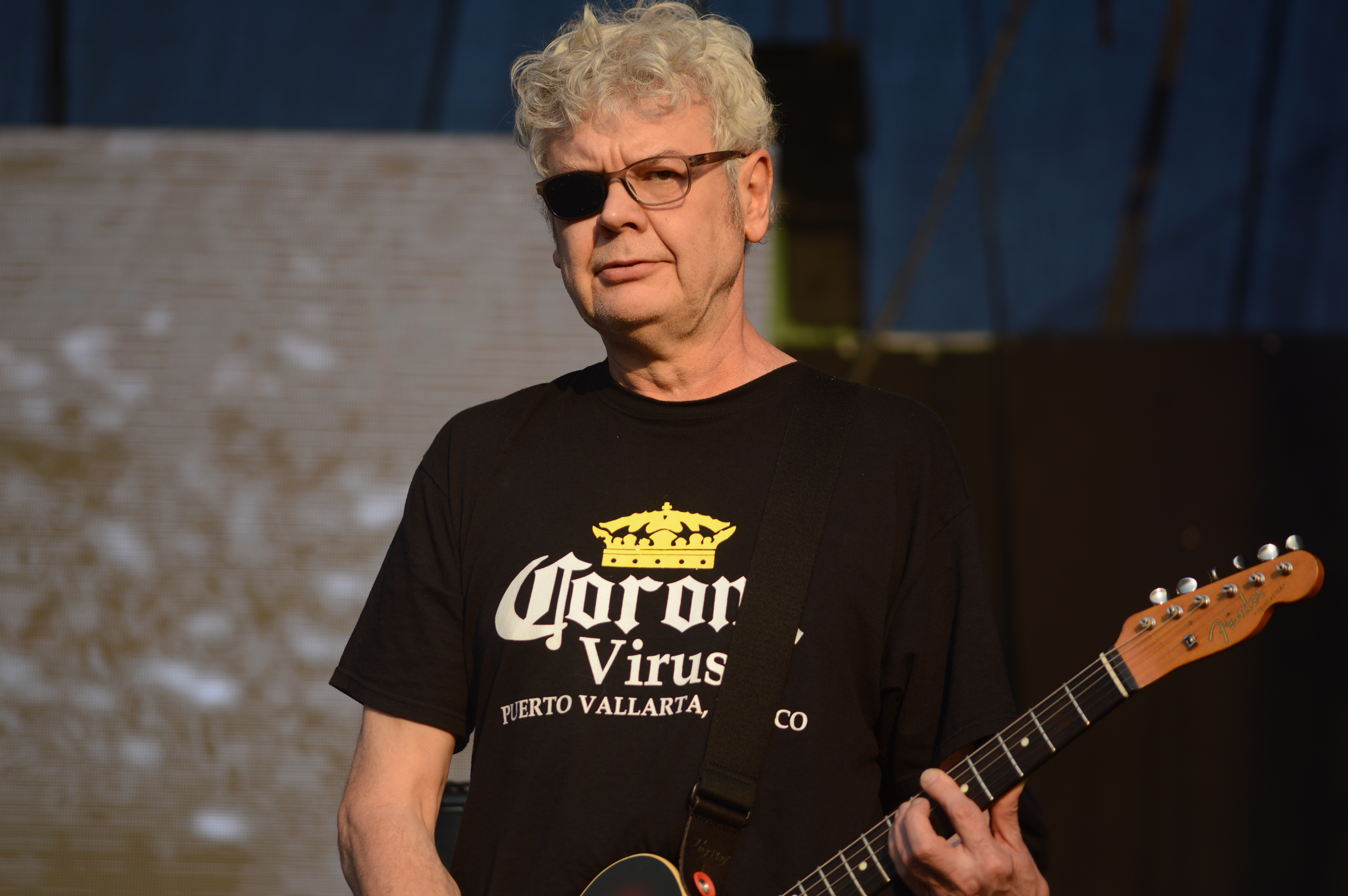
Kult guitarist Piotr Morawiec in 2022 with a T-shirt parodying the Corona logo which references the COVID-19 pandemic.

Corona beer shares part of its name with the coronavirus, the virus responsible for the COVID-19 pandemic. In early 2020, some news outlets reported that 38% of Americans would not buy Corona beer due to its name. This statistic came from a phone poll of 737 American beer drinkers conducted by 5W Public Relations, whose clients include competitors of the maker of Corona. However, the poll question did not specifically mention COVID-19, and the result may have reflected brand preference rather than concern over the virus.

Despite this media coverage, actual sales data showed that Corona beer sales increased during the early months of the pandemic. Sales grew by 8.9% in the first three months of 2020, with a 24% year-over-year increase in the first three weeks of March 2020, likely influenced by higher alcohol consumption while Americans stayed at home.

A study using Nielsen data of U.S. retail beer purchases treated the pandemic as a natural experiment to examine the effect of the name association on Corona sales. It found that each confirmed case of COVID-19 was associated with a $5.3 increase in weekly Corona sales compared with other major beer brands. The study also suggested that the pandemic had heterogeneous impacts on beer producers of different sizes, and results using synthetic control methods and other identification strategies supported the conclusion that the negative name association did not reduce sales.

== See also ==
- Beer in Mexico
- Cocktail garnish
- Compañía Cervecera de Puerto Rico
- Shandy
