= Grupo Modelo =

Large Mexican brewery

Grupo Modelo S.A. de C.V.
- Formerly: Cervecería Modelo, S.A. (1922-1991); Grupo Modelo S.A. de C.V. (1991-2006); Grupo Modelo S.A.B. de C.V. (2006-2014)
- Type: Subsidiary
- Industry: Brewery
- Founded: 1922; 104 years ago
- Headquarters: Mexico City, Mexico
- Products: Beer
- Revenue: ▲US$7.1 billion (2012)
- Net income: ▲US$948.0 million (2012)
- Number of employees: 40,617
- Parent: AB InBev
- Website: gmodelo.com.mx

Grupo Modelo is a large brewery in Mexico owned by Anheuser-Busch InBev that exports beer to most countries of the world. Its export brands include Corona, Modelo, and Pacífico. Grupo Modelo also brews brands that are intended solely for the domestic Mexican market and has exclusive rights in Mexico for the import and distribution of beer produced by Anheuser-Busch. Until the 1960s, Grupo Modelo used red poppy flowers in most of its advertising.

In May 2023, Modelo Especial became the top selling beer in the United States by retail dollar sales, surpassing Bud Light. While both beers are owned by the same parent company outside of the United States, the Modelo brand is owned by Constellation Brands in the US and therefore is not affiliated with AB InBev.

== History ==
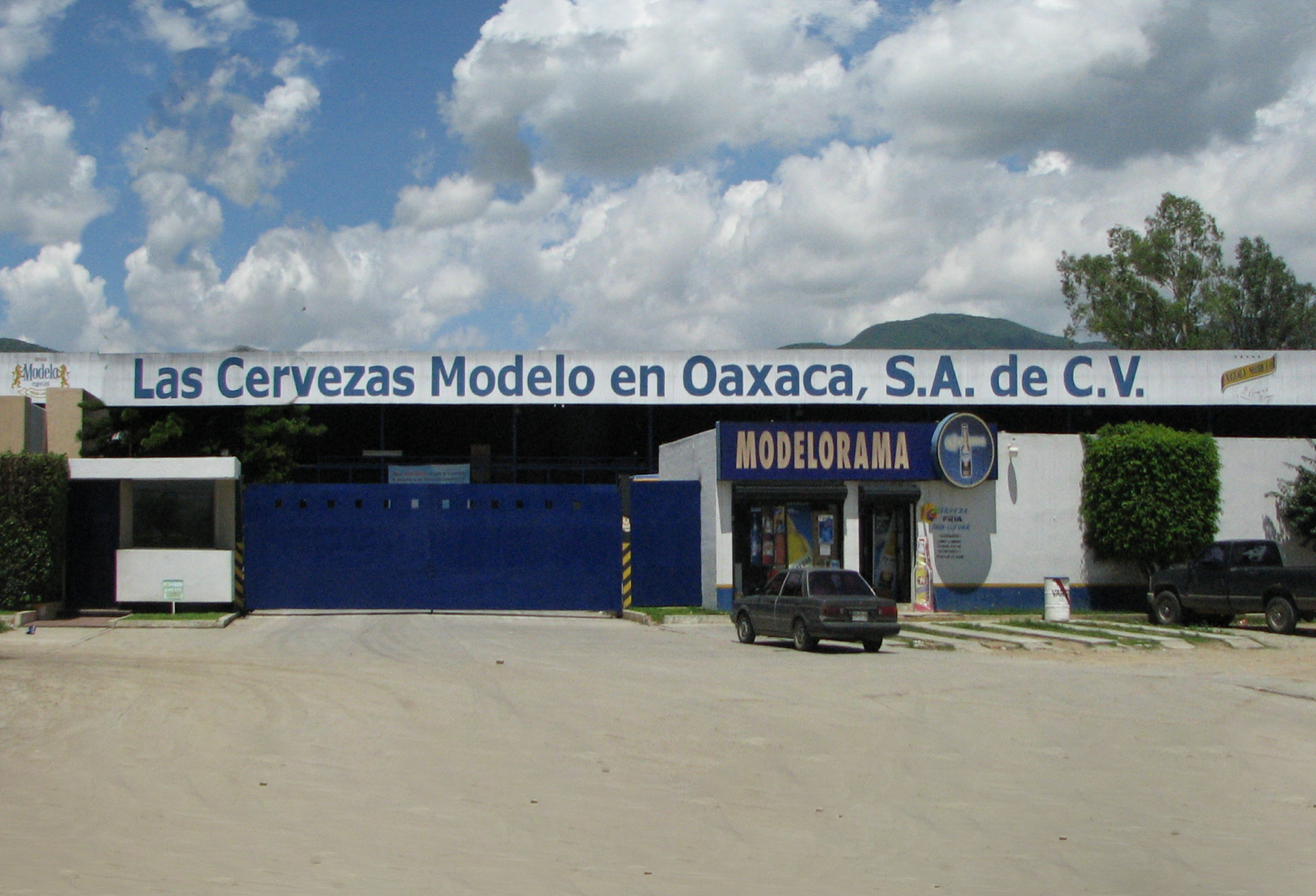
A Modelo business in the Mexican state of Oaxaca

Grupo Modelo began in 1925, and its founders were a group of twenty-five Spanish immigrants among whom stood out: Braulio Iriarte, owner of bakeries and Molino Euzkaro, in Mexico City, and Martín Oyamburu, industrialist, banker and landowner, founder of Hulera Euzkadi, Banco Crédito Español de México, S.A., and oil fields in the Veracruz area and dairy ranches in the Lindavista area, inaugurated the Modelo Brewery, and three years later the marketing of the Modelo, Negra Modelo and Corona brands would begin, which In 1928 they reached 8 million bottles sold.

Grupo Modelo is the leader in Mexico in beer production, distribution and marketing, with 63.0% of the total (domestic and export) market share, as of December 31, 2008. It has seven brewing plants in Mexico, with a total annual installed capacity of 60 million hectoliters. It is the importer of Anheuser-Busch InBev's products in Mexico, including Budweiser, Bud Light and O'Doul's. It also imports the Chinese Tsingtao Brewery brand and the Danish beer Carlsberg. Through a partnership with Nestlé Waters, it produces and distributes in Mexico the bottled water brands Sta. María and Nestlé Pureza Vital, among others.

On June 12, 2008, The Wall Street Journal stated that Anheuser-Busch InBev, which owned a non-controlling 50% stake in the company, might attempt to acquire the remaining 50%. On June 29, 2012, it was announced that Anheuser-Busch InBev would acquire the remaining 50% stake for an all-cash price of $20.1 billion. On January 31, 2013, the US Department of Justice filed an antitrust suit in an attempt to prevent the buyout. The matter was settled, and the two companies merged in June 2013, with the transfer of all United States rights to Constellation Brands. As a result, all the company's brands are made (in Mexico) by an unrelated company. In the United States, Grupo Modelo brands are distributed by Constellation Brands.

== Brands ==
=== Corona ===
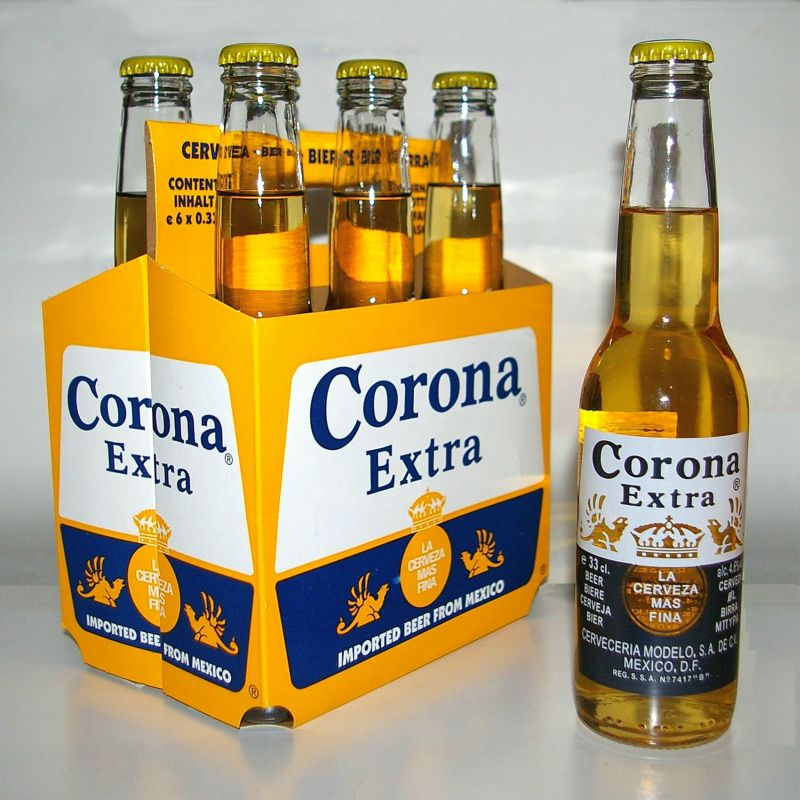
Corona six-pack

The main Corona brand is Corona Extra, a 4.6% alcohol by volume pale lager. It is the top selling beer from Mexico and is one of the top five selling beers worldwide. Available in over 150 countries, it is also Mexico's leading export brand. It was first brewed in 1925 by Cervecería Modelo on the tenth anniversary of the brewery. In 1926 the brewery decided to package the beer in clear glass quarter bottles. In 1997, Corona Extra became the top-selling imported beer in the United States, surpassing Heineken.

Corona Extra is available in a variety of bottle sizes, ranging from the 250 ml (8.5 U.S. fl oz) ampolleta (labeled Coronita and referred to as the cuartito) up to the 940 ml (31.8 U.S. fl oz) Corona Familiar (known as the Familiar or Litro). Corona Mega is now available in a 1.2 liter bottle. A draught version also exists, as does canned Corona in some markets.

Unlike many beers, Corona is bottled in a clear bottle, increasing the opportunity for spoilage. Exposure to sunlight or light from fluorescent bulbs such as those used in refrigerated display cases significantly damages the taste of beer, yielding a taste that is often described as "skunky". This is the result of the essential hop oils spoiling due to UV exposure.

The second Corona brand is Corona Light, the first light beer produced by this brewer. Corona Light has 3.4% alcohol by volume, 99 calories (0.41 kJ), per 355 ml (12.0 U.S. fl oz) bottle.

=== Pacífico ===
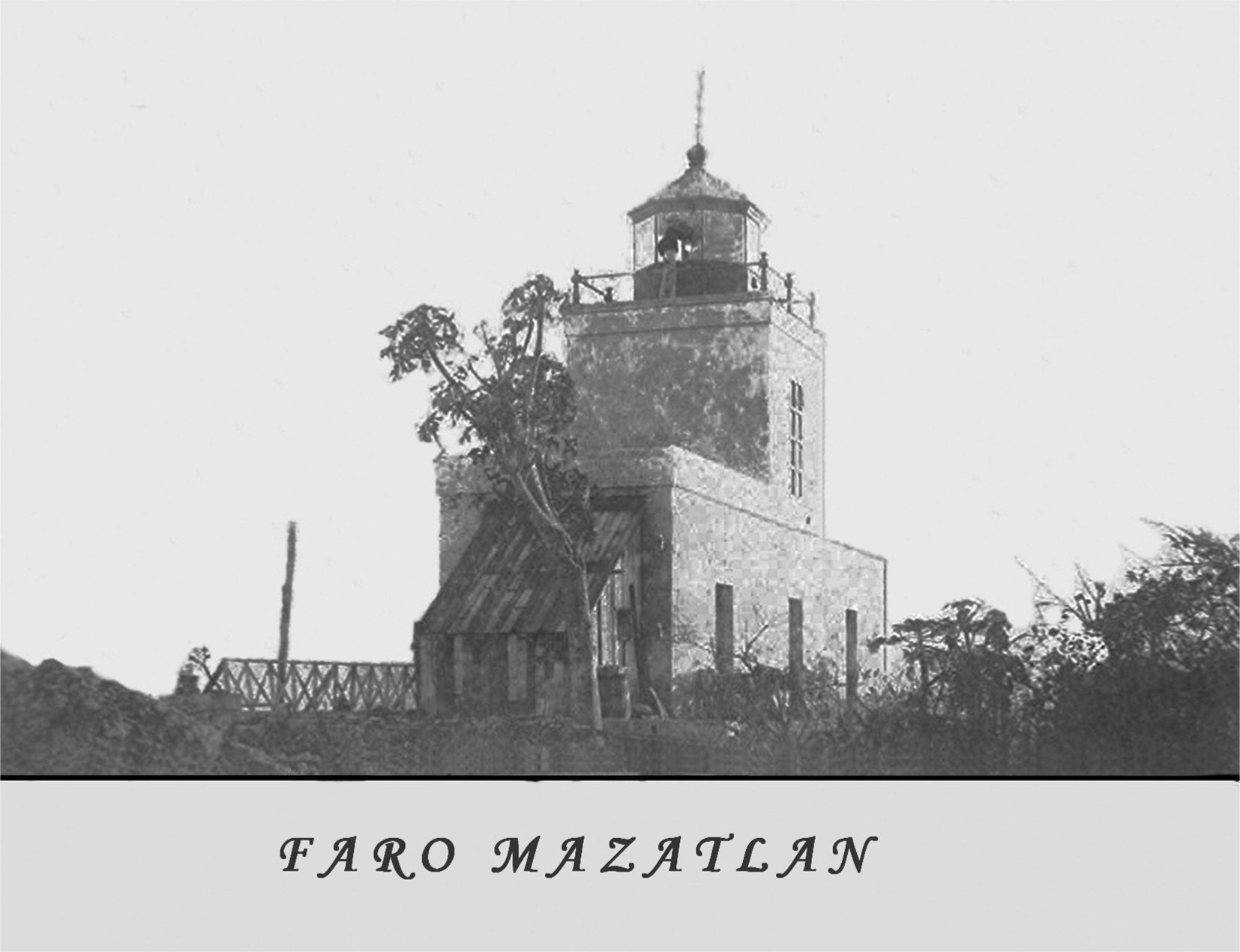
Mazatlán Lighthouse is depicted on the Pacífico label.

Pacífico is a 4.5% abv pale lager originally brewed in Mazatlán, Sinaloa. The name means Pacific. The picture on the bottle is the city's lighthouse, for which it is famous, surrounded by a ring buoy. A light variety was launched in 2008.

=== Modelo Especial ===
First bottled in 1925, Modelo Especial, a 4.4% abv pilsner-style lager, was the number two imported beer in the U.S. by case sales in 2014, selling 22.9 million annually. In June 2023 the beer became the best-selling beer in the United States amid the 2023 Anheuser-Busch boycott. Modelo Especial is most commonly served in 355 ml (12 U.S. fl oz) glass bottles although in some countries can be found in 12-U.S.-fluid-ounce (355 ml) cans.

=== Modelo Light ===
Modelo Light is a light lager that was first produced in 1994.

=== Modelo Negra ===
Modelo Negra or Negra Modelo is a 5.4% abv Dunkel-style lager first brewed in Mexico by Austrian immigrants, and was introduced as a draft beer in 1926. Modelo Negra comes in an unusually shaped, wide brown bottle with a trademark gold label. Modelo Negra is most commonly served in 355ml glass bottles.

=== Modelo Reserva ===
Modelo Reserva ('Reserve') is Modelo Especial finished on aged wood from tequila barrels. It is a German Pilsner made in Mexico with a 5.5% ABV.

=== Victoria ===
Victoria is a 4% abv Vienna lager first brewed in Toluca, México, in 1865 by Compañía Toluca y México. Grupo Modelo bought out Compañía Toluca y México in 1935.

It is sold in the United States in standard 12 U.S.oz bottles and 940 ml (31.8 U.S. fl oz) familiares; a smaller 150 ml (5.1 U.S. fl oz) bottle exists, but it is rare. The labels of all its presentations depict Gambrinus holding aloft a frothing mug.

Victoria beer is available in six, twelve, and twenty-four pack bottles in 39 states.

=== Estrella Jalisco ===
Estrella ("star" in Spanish) is a pilsner beer produced in the Guadalajara Modelo plant. Estrella was first produced in the late 19th century by Cervecería Estrella (currently known as Cervecería Modelo de Guadalajara), that Grupo Modelo acquired in 1954. Estrella Jalisco is the only beer imported into the United States under ownership of Anheuser Busch.

=== León ===
León is a Munich-type dark amber-colored beer, that mixes a sweetness with light bitterness, and a white foam. The León brand was first launched into the market in the early 1900s, its origin is traced back to the southeast region of Mexico, over the years it has become popular throughout the country.

== Extra and Modelorama ==
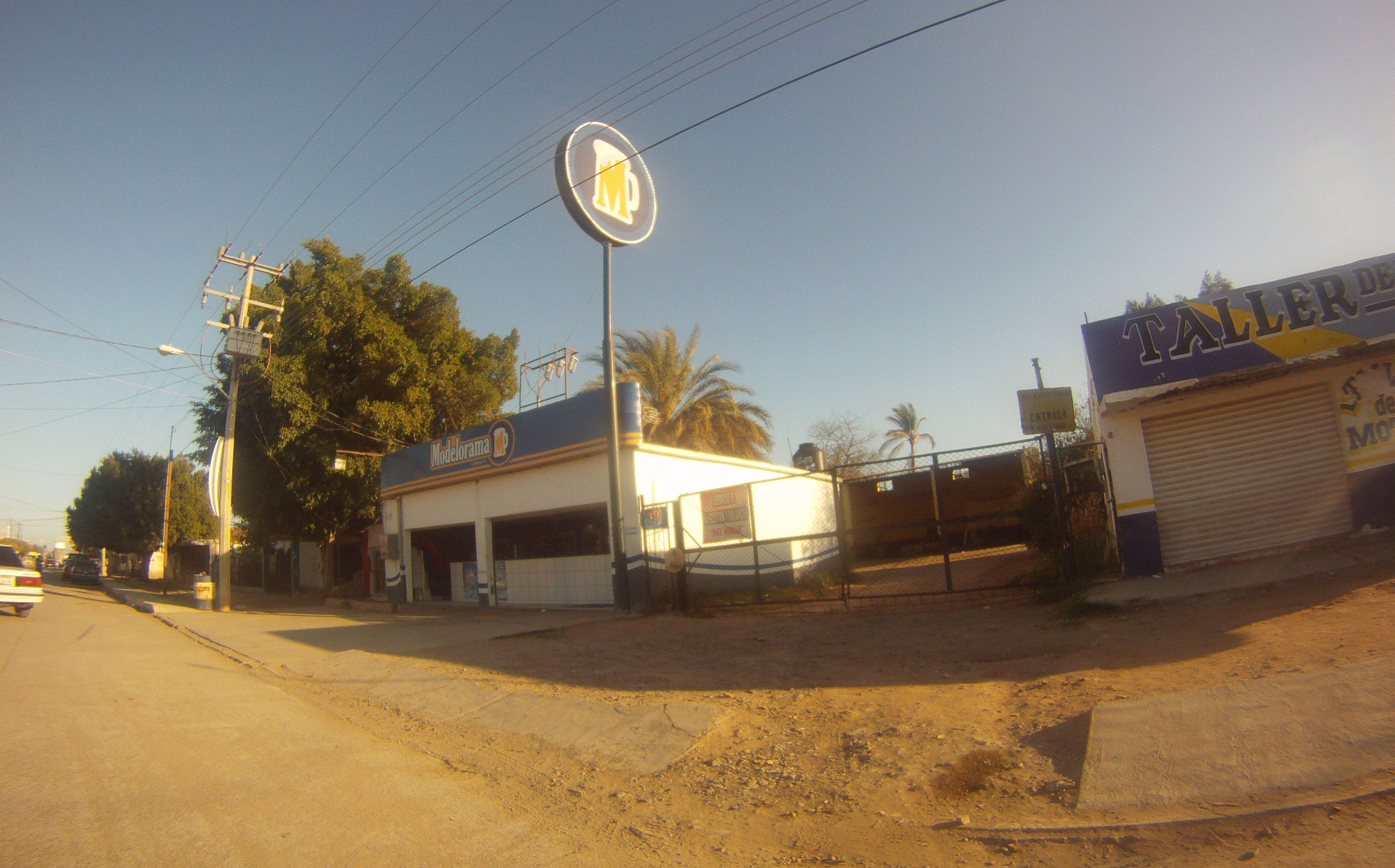
"Modelorama" distribution center (Panoramio)

Grupo Modelo is the owner of the Extra convenience store chain.

After the start of the COVID-19 pandemic, the company has established a new concept named "Modelorama Now" in which beer, snacks and soda are delivered to homes after being ordered online on their website.

== See also ==
- Beer in Mexico
