= Leon Beer =

Cypriot beer

Leon Beer Μπύρα ΛΕΩΝ
- Manufacturer: Photos Photiades Breweries
- Introduced: 1937
- Alcohol by volume: 4.5
- Style: all malt beer

Leon Beer was the product of the first brewery in Cyprus founded in 1937.

Production of Leon Beer was suspended in 1962 because the company acquired the license to produce Carlsberg locally (which began in 1969).

In 2003, the brewery re-launched Leon based on the original recipe used in 1937. It is an "All Malt" beer because only malt, hops and yeast are used in its production.

Until the arrival of KEO in 1951, Leon was the only locally produced beer.
