= KEO (beer) =

Brand of beer brewed in Cyprus

KEO Beer
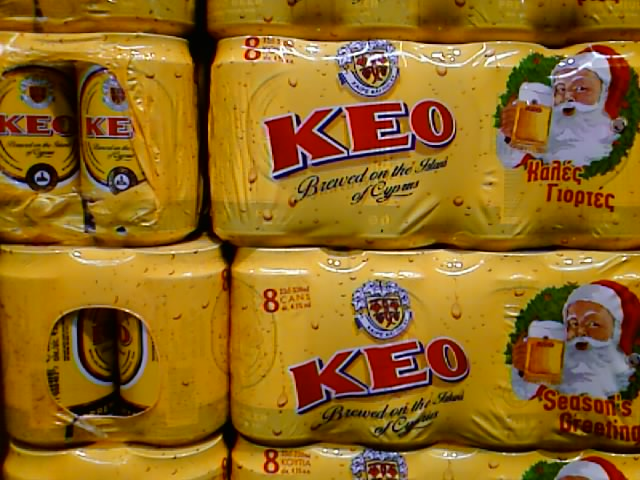
- 330ml cans on a supermarket display.
- Manufacturer: KEO Ltd
- Introduced: 1951
- Alcohol by volume: 4.5%
- Style: Pilsner
- Website: www.keogroup.com

KEO is a Cypriot beer. It is a light straw-colored lager with a thick head, and is sometimes compared to a pilsner in taste. The name KEO is the beer producer's corporate acronym of Κυπριακή Εταιρία Οίνων (Cyprus Wine Company).

The beer is brewed in Limassol, in Cyprus. The beer won the 1987 brewing industry world bottled lager competition gold medal. In 2010, KEO held a 32.4% share of the island's beer market.

== History ==
During British colonial rule and following the successful introduction of industrial beer production in 1937, the KEO company launched their beer product in 1951. The original recipe and technical consultation came from Czechoslovakia, however, increase in demand necessitated sequential production facility upgrades although the recipe remained unchanged.

== Awards ==
Keo beer was awarded a gold medal by the Brewing Industry International Awards.

== Controversy ==
In 2010 the appearance of the beer in a pornographic American film sparked a reaction by the largest shareholder in the company, the Church of Cyprus.
