= Sands (surname) =

Sands is an English and Scottish surname. Notable people with the surname include:

- Benjamin Aymar Sands (1853–1917), American lawyer
- Benjamin F. Sands (1811–1883), officer in the United States Navy during the Mexican–American War and the American Civil War
- Bethanie Mattek-Sands (born 1985), American tennis player
- Billy Sands (1911–1984), American character actor
- Bobby Sands (1954–1981), Irish republican who died in the 1981 Irish Hunger Strike
- Bradley Sands (born 1978), American author and editor
- Charlie Sands (baseball) (1947–2016), American baseball player
- Charlie Sands (ice hockey) (1911–1953), Canadian ice hockey player
- Charles Sands (1865–1945), American golfer and tennis player
- Cole Sands (born 1997), American baseball player
- Comfort Sands (1748–1834), American politician
- Dave Sands (1926–1952), Australian aborigine boxer
- Diana Sands (1934–1973), African-American actress
- Diane Sands (born 1947), American politician from Montana
- Donny Sands (born 1996), American baseball player
- Duane Sands (born 1962), Bahamian politician
- Edward F. Sands (1894–19??), suspect in the murder of Hollywood director William Desmond Taylor
- Evie Sands (born 1946), American singer, songwriter and musician
- Ferdinand Sands (1806–1839), American lawyer
- James Sands (born 2000), American soccer player
- James H. Sands (1845–1911), officer in the United States Navy during the American Civil War
- Jerry Sands (born 1987), American baseball player
- Jodie Sands, American singer
- John Sands (footballer) (1859–1924), English footballer
- John Sands (journalist) (1826–1900), Scottish journalist and artist
- Johnny Sands (1928–2003), American actor
- Joshua Sands (politician) (1757–1835), member of the United States House of Representatives from New York
- Joshua R. Sands (1795–1883), United States Navy officer
- Julian Sands (1958–2023), British actor
- Leevan Sands (born 1981), Bahamian triple jumper and Olympic medallist
- Lynsay Sands, Canadian author of over 30 books
- Marvin Sands (1924–1999), American businessman, founder and CEO of Constellation Brands
- Michael Sands (media) (1945–2012), American model, actor and media consultant
- Mike Sands (athlete) (born 1953), Bahamian sprint athlete and athletics official
- Mike Sands (ice hockey) (born 1963), Canadian ice hockey player
- Percy Sands (1881–1965), English footballer
- Peter Sands (banker) (born 1961), British banker, former CEO of Standard Chartered Bank
- Peter Sands (politician) (1924–2015), Irish Fianna Fáil politician
- Philippe Sands (born 1960), British professor of international law and author of Lawless World
- Renee Sands (born 1974), American singer and actress
- Richard Sands (businessman) (born 1950), American billionaire, chairman of Constellation Brands
- Rob Sands (born 1958/59), American billionaire, CEO of Constellation Brands
- Robert Sands (artist) (born 1943), American artist
- Robert Sands (conductor) (1828–1872), Irish-born conductor of the Mormon Tabernacle Choir in the United States' Utah Territory
- Robert Charles Sands (1799–1832), American writer
- Roger Sands (1942–2025), British public servant
- Roland Sands (born 1974), American motorcycle racer
- Sarah Sands (born 1961), British journalist and author
- Shamar Sands (born 1985), Bahamian hurdler
- Stafford Sands (1913–1972), finance minister of the Bahamas, helped create the Bahamas' tourism industry
- Tara Sands (born 1975), American voice actress
- Terdell Sands (born 1979), American football player
- Tom Sands (born 1954), American politician from Iowa
- Tommy Sands (American singer) (born 1937), American singer and actor
- Tommy Sands (Irish singer) (born 1945), Northern Irish folk singer, songwriter, radio broadcaster, and political activist
- Walter B. Sands (1870–1938), chief justice of the Montana Supreme Court

Fictional characters

- The Sands family (father David, deceased mother Francine, daughter Jordan, and son Hunter) from the 2010 movie The Boy Who Cried Werewolf
- George Sands, a lead character in the British television series Being Human
- Sheldon Sands, a CIA agent (portrayed by Johnny Depp) from the 2003 movie Once Upon a Time in Mexico
- Max Sands, a racist biker in the HBO drama Oz
- Inspector Sands, fictional inspector in a code phrase used by public transport authorities in the United Kingdom, including Network Rail and London Underground, to alert staff to a fire alarm without needing to evacuate the station

== See also ==
- Sand (surname)
- Sandys (surname)
- Michael Sands (disambiguation)
