= Robert Sands =

Robert Sands may refer to:

- Robert Sands (artist) (born 1943), American artist
- Rob Sands, American billionaire, CEO of Constellation Brands
- Robert Sands (conductor) (1828–1872), conductor of the Mormon Tabernacle Choir
- Bobby Sands (1954–1981), member of the Irish Republican Army
- Robert Charles Sands (1799–1832), American writer
- Robert Sands (American football) (born 1989), football player
