= Constellation Brands – Marvin Sands Performing Arts Center =

Concert venue in Hopewell, New York, US

- CMAC
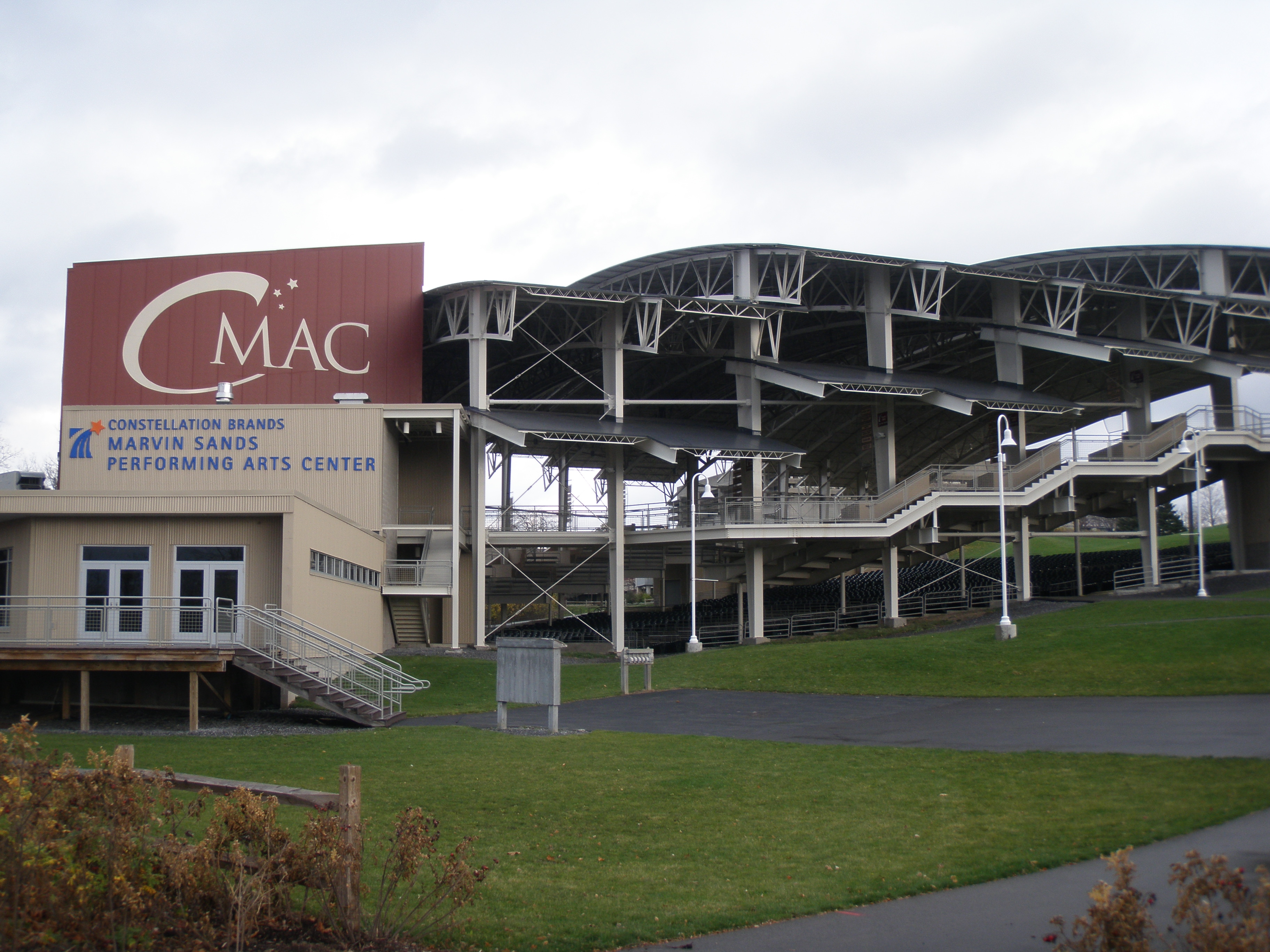
- CMAC "shell"
- Interactive map of Constellation Brands – Marvin Sands Performing Arts Center
- Former names: Finger Lakes Performing Arts Center (1983-2005)
- Address: 3355 Marvin Sands Drive
- Location: Hopewell, New York
- Coordinates: 42°52′0″N 77°14′37″W
- Owner: Finger Lakes Community College
- Operator: ASM Global
- Seating type: reserved and lawn
- Capacity: 15,000
- Type: Amphitheatre

Construction
- Opened: 1983
- Renovated: 2005-2006

Website
- www.cmacevents.com

The Constellation Brands-Marvin Sands Performing Arts Center (CMAC), originally the Finger Lakes Performing Arts Center (FLPAC), is an outdoor concert venue in the Town of Hopewell, New York, just east of the City of Canandaigua, on the grounds of Finger Lakes Community College.

The amphitheater opened in 1983, with a mix of seating under the open air roof and on the hillside lawn looking down into the facility. It is the summer home of the Rochester Philharmonic Orchestra and is managed by ASM Global (the same firm that formerly managed the Blue Cross Arena in Rochester, New York).

Between the 2005 and 2006 seasons the amphitheater was rebuilt at a cost of about $13 million, to add 54 elevated luxury booths (seating capacity of 4 per booth), expand the general seating under the amphitheater roof from 2,600 to 5,000, and install new state of the art house lighting and sound systems.

The center is named after Constellation Brands, a total beverage alcohol company, and Marvin Sands, founder of the Canandaigua Brands winery. Marvin founded CMAC because he realized the important role that arts and culture play in the quality of the community. In recent years, CMAC has attracted sold-out shows and musical performers such as: Dave Matthews, Kenny Chesney, Sugarland, Lady Antebellum, Bob Dylan, Ringo Starr, Mumford & Sons, Kid Rock, Snoop Dogg, The Allman Brothers, Luke Bryan, Hans Zimmer and Lynyrd Skynyrd.

== Events ==
List of Events
- Joni Mitchell – July 18, 1983
- Preservation Hall Jazz Band – July 21, 1983, August 9, 1996 with Pete Fountain and Al Hirt and August 2, 1997 with Al Hirt and Pete Fountain
- Al Jarreau – August 9, 1983, July 19, 1985 with David Sanborn, August 18, 1987 with Chaka Khan and August 1, 1989 with Take 6
- Diana Ross – August 19, 1983, June 15, 1991 and June 18, 2014
- Paul Anka – July 1, 1984
- Jimmy Buffett & The Coral Reefer Band – July 2, 1984 and August 14, 1990 with Zachary Richard
- The Moody Blues – July 6, 1984, July 15, 1986 with The Fixx, July 28, 1988 with The John Kilzer Band, August 11, 1990 with The Jimmy Ryser Band, August 16, 1991 with Neverland, July 11, 1993 with the Rochester Philharmonic Orchestra, June 19, 1996 with the Rochester Philharmonic Orchestra, September 1, 1999, August 3, 2000, July 6, 2005, July 27, 2007 and July 9, 2010
- Henry Mancini – July 8, 1984 with the Rochester Philharmonic Orchestra, July 28, 1987 with Johnny Mathis and August 11, 1991 with the Rochester Philharmonic Orchestra
- Judy Collins – July 14, 1984, August 15, 1988 with Chet Atkins and July 9, 1994 with the Rochester Philharmonic Orchestra
- Minnie Pearl – July 20, 1984
- Lou Rawls – July 26, 1984 with Nancy Wilson
- Peter, Paul & Mary – July 27, 1984, August 16, 1985, July 24, 1986, August 4, 1988, August 1, 1991, July 28, 1995, August 7, 1998 and August 26, 2000
- Happy Together Tour – July 30, 1984 with The Turtles, The Association, Gary Puckett & The Union Gap and Spanky and Our Gang and July 12, 1985 with The Turtles, The Grass Roots, The Buckinghams and Gary Lewis & The Playboys
- Oscar Peterson – August 2–3, 1984
- Air Supply – August 9, 1984 and August 20, 1986
- The Kingston Trio – August 12, 1984
- Joan Baez – August 17, 1984 and August 24, 1990 with The Indigo Girls
- Tony Bennett – August 19, 1984 with the Rochester Philharmonic Orchestra, September 6, 1998, September 3, 2000 with Diana Krall, August 24, 2001 with k.d. lang and August 20, 2011
- Rick Springfield – September 9, 1984, with Corey Hart and July 6, 2014, with Pat Benatar and William Beckett
- Emmylou Harris – June 14, 1985 with Tom Rush
- Eric Clapton – June 23, 1985, with Graham Parker
- The Charlie Daniels Band – June 29, 1985
- Santana – July 10, 1985, July 23, 1987, July 28, 1992, with Phish and June 2, 1999
- Ferrante & Teicher – July 14, 1985 with the Rochester Philharmonic Orchestra
- Chuck Mangione – July 26, 1985 and August 24, 1986 with the Rochester Philharmonic Orchestra
- Teresa Brewer – July 28, 1985 with the Rochester Philharmonic Orchestra
- The Four Tops – July 29, 1985 with The Temptations and July 23, 1986 with The Temptations
- Al Hirt – August 4, 1985 with the Rochester Philharmonic Orchestra and July 10, 1987 with Pete Fountain
- Liza Minnelli – August 5–6, 1985
- Liberace – August 8–9, 1985
- Sid Caesar and Carol Lawrence – August 18, 1985 with the Rochester Philharmonic Orchestra
- Paul Young – August 22, 1985 with Nik Kershaw
- Steve Lawrence and Eydie Gorme – August 23, 1985
- The Pointer Sisters – August 26, 1985 and June 9, 1986 with El DeBarge
- Perry Como – August 28–29, 1985
- Arlo Guthrie – August 30, 1985 with Pete Seeger
- Depeche Mode – June 12, 1986, with The Book of Love
- America – June 13, 1986, with Stephen Stills and Tom Chapin and August 12, 1988, with Joe Cocker
- Steppenwolf – June 15, 1986 with The Guess Who
- Mike + The Mechanics – June 20, 1986
- Robert Palmer – June 21, 1986 with Belinda Carlisle
- Julian Lennon – June 25, 1986
- Frankie Avalon, Fabian and Bobby Rydell – June 30, 1986
- The Monkees – July 14, 1986, with Herman's Hermits, The Grass Roots and Gary Puckett & The Union Gap, August 14, 1987 with "Weird Al" Yankovic and August 22, 1996
- Joan Armatrading – July 17, 1986 with Graham Nash
- Starship – July 18, 1986, with The Outfield
- Tex Beneke and His Orchestra – July 28, 1986 with The Modernaires with Paula Kelly Jr. and Helen Forrest
- Folk Festival – July 30, 1986 with Glenn Yarbrough, The Limelighters, The Kingston Trio and Melanie
- Jean-Luc Ponty – July 31, 1986
- Billy Crystal – August 4, 1986 with Leon Redbone
- Mr. Mister – August 8, 1986, with The Bangles
- Cleo Laine – August 10, 1986 with the Rochester Philharmonic Orchestra
- Stevie Nicks – August 11, 1986 with Peter Frampton and July 27, 1994
- John Fogerty – August 30, 1986 with Bonnie Raitt and August 7, 2008
- Steve Winwood – September 1, 1986 with Jimmy Cliff
- Ricky Skaggs – September 6, 1986
- Hank Williams Jr. – June 18, 1987
- The Beach Boys – June 22, 1987, September 4, 1988, June 25, 1992, June 29, 1994, with America, August 14, 2004 and August 20, 2006
- Duran Duran – June 26, 1987 with Erasure
- Newport Jazz Festival – June 27–28, 1987 (Day 1: Wynton Marsalis, The Temptations, Dizzy Gillespie, Stanley Jordan, Kenny G and Cabo Frio, Day 2: Stevie Ray Vaughan & Double Trouble, Stan Getz, Charlie Watts Orchestra, Branford Marsalis, Phyllis Hyman and The Majestics)
- Diahann Carroll and Vic Damone – June 30, 1987
- Gloria Estefan & Miami Sound Machine – July 3, 1987
- Rosemary Clooney – July 5, 1987 with the Rochester Philharmonic Orchestra
- Whitney Houston – July 7, 1987, with Jonathan Butler and July 30, 1991, with After 7
- Della Reese – July 19, 1987 with the Rochester Philharmonic Orchestra
- Frankie Valli and The Four Seasons – July 20, 1987
- Dan Fogelberg – July 24, 1987
- Rita Moreno – July 26, 1987 with the Rochester Philharmonic Orchestra
- Howie Mandel – July 30, 1987
- Willie Nelson and Family – August 3, 1987
- Sheena Easton – August 8, 1987
- Night Ranger – August 12, 1987
- Robert Goulet – August 16, 1987 with the Rochester Philharmonic Orchestra
- Classic Superfest Tour – August 21, 1987 with The Turtles, The Byrds, Mark Lindsay, Herman's Hermits and The Grass Roots
- Crosby, Stills & Nash – August 24, 1987 with The Fabulous Thunderbirds, June 24, 1992, July 19, 2004, June 10, 2009 and June 12, 2012
- Kenny Loggins – August 25, 1987
- Bob Dylan – June 28, 1988, July 25, 1989, with Steve Earle, July 19, 2000, with Phil Lesh and Friends, August 19, 2008 and August 9, 2011, with Leon Russell
- John Denver – July 22, 1988, August 4, 1990 and August 2–3, 1997
- Little Feat – July 27, 1989 and August 30, 1990
- The Doobie Brothers – August 4, 1989, June 27, 1991, with Joe Walsh, July 10, 1999, with Chicago and June 25, 2014, with Peter Frampton and Matthew Curry
- Jefferson Airplane – August 23, 1989, with Hot Tuna
- Fleetwood Mac – July 11, 1990, with Squeeze and July 18, 1995, with REO Speedwagon and Pat Benatar
- Stevie Ray Vaughan & Double Trouble – July 12, 1990, with Joe Cocker
- Bonnie Raitt – August 3, 1990, with The Jeff Healey Band, August 31, 1991, August 17, 1994, with Bruce Hornsby, June 10, 1995, with Charles Brown and Ruth Brown, August 14, 2002, with Lyle Lovett and July 14, 2006, with Keb' Mo'
- Steve Winwood – July 8, 1991, with Joe Cocker and June 1, 2012, with Michael Franti & Spearhead
- Yes – July 19, 1991, June 19, 1994, July 4, 1998, June 30, 2010, with Peter Frampton and July 7, 2011, with Styx
- Gordon Lightfoot – July 23, 1991
- Ray Charles – July 27, 1991
- The Steve Miller Band – July 31, 1991, with Eric Johnson
- Bad Company – August 15, 1991, with The Damn Yankees and July 2, 2009, with The Doobie Brothers
- Sting – September 2, 1991, with The Special Beat and Vinx
- Emerson, Lake & Palmer – August 8, 1992
- Ringo Starr & His All-Starr Band – August 25, 1992, July 21, 2010 and June 7, 2014
- Glenn Frey – June 4, 1993, with Joe Walsh
- Barry Manilow – July 13, 1993, August 9, 1997, August 24, 1999 and July 20, 2002
- Foreigner – August 23, 1993
- Phish – July 14, 1994, June 22, 1995, June 29, 2010 and July 15, 2014
- Jackson Browne – July 31, 1994, with John Hiatt and August 1, 2009, with Steve Earle
- John Mellencamp – August 19, 1994, with Texas
- Hall & Oates – July 19, 1995, with Carly Simon
- The Allman Brothers Band – August 6, 1995, with Rusted Root, July 22, 2005, with Gavin DeGraw, August 22, 2008, with RatDog and August 22, 2009, with Widespread Panic
- The Dave Matthews Band – August 25, 1995, with Dionne Farris, June 5, 1997, with Béla Fleck and the Flecktones and August 3, 1999, with Boy Wonder
- Soul Asylum – August 27, 1995, with The Jayhawks and Matthew Sweet
- Neil Young & Crazy Horse – August 18, 1996, with Jewel and The Afghan Whigs
- The Cranberries – August 27, 1996
- Tori Amos – August 29, 1996, August 6, 1998 and August 17, 2003, with Ben Folds and The Suburbs
- Styx – August 31, 1996, with Kansas, August 18, 2005, with REO Speedwagon and July 9, 2014, with Foreigner and Don Felder
- The G3 Tour – June 25, 1997
- The Barenaked Ladies – July 2, 1997, July 26, 1999, with The Beautiful South, August 14, 2010, with Ben Kweller and Angel Taylor and July 7, 2012, with The Blues Traveler, Big Head Todd and the Monsters and Cracker
- Bush – July 3, 1997, with Veruca Salt
- No Doubt – July 7, 1997
- Lilith Fair – July 20, 1997, July 10, 1998 and August 1, 1999
- Jewel – September 1, 1997
- WNVE 95.1 The Brew's Birthday Bash – June 1, 1998
- The H.O.R.D.E. Festival – July 26, 1998
- Deep Purple – August 14, 1998, with Emerson, Lake & Palmer and Dream Theater
- The All That & More Festival – July 1, 1999
- The Goo Goo Dolls – August 28, 1999, with Sugar Ray and Fastball
- Poison – June 27, 2000, with Dokken, Cinderella and Slaughter
- Jethro Tull – July 28, 2000 and June 17, 2010, with Procol Harum
- Mötley Crüe – August 6, 2000, with Megadeth
- B.B. King Blues Festival – September 2, 2000, September 2, 2001, August 20, 2002 and August 26, 2011
- Phil Lesh and Friends – July 24, 2001, with Colonel Les Claypool's Fearless Flying Frog Brigade
- The 60's Doo–Wop Concert – August 9, 2001
- Natalie Cole – August 11, 2001
- Tony Bennett – August 24, 2001, with k.d. lang and August 20, 2011
- Harry Connick Jr. – June 13, 2002 and June 24, 2004
- The String Cheese Incident – July 21, 2001, with Junior Brown
- Travis Tritt – July 10, 2002
- Vince Gill – August 16, 2002, with Trisha Yearwood
- Sheryl Crow – August 31, 2002, August 3, 2008, with James Blunt and Toots and the Maytals and August 13, 2010, with Colbie Caillat
- Third Eye Blind – July 13, 2003
- Lyle Lovett – July 2, 2004 and August 22, 2011
- Norah Jones – August 24, 2004, with Amos Lee
- Celtic Woman – July 28, 2005 and July 17, 2006
- ZZ Top – August 27, 2005, with Junior Brown and Donna the Buffalo
- RatDog – July 10, 2006, with The String Cheese Incident and August 22, 2008
- Johnny Mathis – July 21, 2006
- The HippieFest – August 10, 2006
- Chris Botti – August 19, 2006
- Big & Rich – August 25, 2006, with Cowboy Troy
- Diana Krall – July 9, 2007, with Chris Botti
- Clay Aiken – July 19, 2007
- Liza Minnelli – July 31, 2007
- Union Station – August 3, 2007
- O.A.R. – August 8, 2007 and August 6, 2011
- Eddie Money – August 15, 2007, with John Waite and The Lou Gramm Band
- Willie Nelson & Family – August 26, 2007, with Merle Haggard & The Strangers and Ricky Skaggs & Kentucky Thunder, July 29, 2010, with The Levon Helm Band and June 21, 2014, with Alison Krauss and Kacey Musgraves
- Robert Plant – June 7, 2008, with Alison Krauss and T Bone Burnett
- The Laurie Berkner Band – June 8, 2008
- Hank Williams Jr. – June 21, 2008, with Lynyrd Skynyrd and Pat Green
- Steely Dan – July 11, 2008, with Sam Yahel, July 23, 2011 and July 20, 2013, with The Deep Blue Organ Trio
- Melissa Ethridge – July 13, 2008
- The Stone Temple Pilots – July 15, 2008, with The Black Rebel Motorcycle Club and TAB the Band
- Kenny Chesney – July 22, 2008, with LeAnn Rimes, August 24, 2011, with Billy Currington and Uncle Kracker and August 21, 2013, with The Eli Young Band and Kacey Musgraves
- Gary Allan – July 25, 2008, with Sara Evans and Luke Bryan
- Kid Rock & Twisted Brown Trucker – August 20, 2008, with Back Door Slam
- The Wegmans Reggae Festival – August 24, 2008
- David Byrne – June 2, 2009, with Ani DiFranco
- The Offspring – June 30, 2009, with The Dropkick Murphys and Frank Turner & The Sleeping Souls
- Judas Priest – July 8, 2009, with Whitesnake and Pop Evil
- Tim McGraw – July 16, 2009, with The Lost Trailers, June 29, 2012, with Dierks Bentley and Kip Moore and May 30, 2014, with Kip Moore and Cassadee Pope
- Jason Mraz – August 2, 2009, with G. Love & Special Sauce and K'naan
- John Legend – August 10, 2009, with India.Arie and Vaughn Anthony
- Blondie – August 11, 2009, with Pat Benatar and The Donnas
- The Counting Crows – September 6, 2009, with Augustana
- Sugarland – June 13, 2010, with Luke Bryan and Danny Gokey
- The Rochester Philharmonic Orchestra – July 3, 2010
- Dave Matthews & Tim Reynolds – July 6, 2010 and July 15, 2012
- The Swingin' 60's & 70's Concert – July 10, 2010
- Weezer – July 11, 2010, with The Rival Schools
- The Flaming Lips – July 23, 2010, with The Black Keys and Fang Island
- The Carnival of Madness Tour – August 6, 2010 and August 16, 2013
- Maroon 5 – August 7, 2010, with V V Brown
- George Thorogood & The Destroyers – August 11, 2010, with The Fabulous Thunderbirds and The Robert Cray Band
- REO Speedwagon – August 22, 2010, with Pat Benatar and Tyler Bryant
- My Morning Jacket – August 28, 2010, with The New Pornographers
- Jason Aldean – August 29, 2010, with Luke Bryan and Uncle Kracker
- Ray LaMontagne – June 4, 2011, with Brandi Carlile and The Secret Sisters and June 1, 2014, with Jason Isbell & The 400 Unit and The Belle Brigade
- Miranda Lambert – June 9, 2011, with Josh Kelley and Justin Moore
- Furthur – July 26, 2011, July 7, 2012 and July 9, 2013
- Kid Cudi – July 27, 2011, with Chip tha Ripper
- Wiz Khalifa – August 3, 2011, with Girl Talk
- Guster – August 13, 2011, with Jack's Mannequin and Ra Ra Riot
- Lynyrd Skynyrd – August 25, 2011, with The Doobie Brothers
- Lady Antebellum – June 3, 2012, with Darius Rucker and Thompson Square and August 29, 2014, with Joe Nichols and Billy Currington
- Yanni – June 13, 2012
- Sarah McLachlan – June 26, 2012
- Demi Lovato – July 1, 2012, with Hot Chelle Rae
- The B-52's – July 14, 2012, with Squeeze
- Meat Loaf & His Neverland Express – July 21, 2012
- Snoop Dogg – August 2, 2012, with Yelawolf
- Mumford & Sons – August 7, 2012, with Dawes and Aaron Embry
- The Dukes of September Rhythm Revue – August 11, 2012
- Journey – August 15, 2012, with Pat Benatar and Loverboy
- Eric Church – August 18, 2012, with Robert Earl Keen
- Train – August 24, 2012, with Mat Kearney and Andy Grammer
- Kelly Clarkson & The Fray – August 29, 2012, with Carolina Liar
- The Fresh Beat Band – September 2, 2012
- Luke Bryan – May 30, 2013, with Thompson Square and Florida Georgia Line and August 1, 2014, with Lee Brice and Cole Swindell
- The Lumineers – June 7, 2013, with The Cold War Kids
- LL Cool J – June 22, 2013, with Ice Cube, Public Enemy and De La Soul
- The Gigantour – July 6, 2013
- fun. – July 13, 2013, with Tegan and Sara
- 3 Doors Down & Daughtry – July 16, 2013, with Halestorm
- Def Leppard – July 17, 2013, with Slash featuring Myles Kennedy & The Conspirators
- The Avett Brothers – July 26, 2013, with Grace Potter and the Nocturnals
- Smash Mouth – July 27, 2013, with Sugar Ray, Gin Blossoms, Vertical Horizon and Fastball
- OneRepublic – July 28, 2013, with Mayer Hawthorne and Churchill
- The Black Crowes – July 31, 2013, with The Tedeschi Trucks Band and The London Souls
- Keith Urban – August 9, 2013, with Little Big Town and Dustin Lynch
- Kesha – August 25, 2013, with Semi Precious Weapons and Mike Posner
- Death Cab for Cutie – May 29, 2014, with Built to Spill and The Head and the Heart
- Skrillex – June 2, 2014, with Dillon Francis, What So Not and Milo & Otis
- Dierks Bentley – June 20, 2014, with Chris Young and Chase Rice
- Frankie Valli & The 4 Seasons – July 19, 2014
- Hunter Hayes – August 17, 2014, with Dan + Shay and Sam Hunt
- Josh Groban – August 22, 2014, with The Rochester Philharmonic Orchestra

== Board of directors ==
Board of directors

- President and executive director – Virginia (Ginny) A. Clark
- Vice president – Sarah Axelrod
- Vice president – George Hamlin IV
- Vice president – Stency Wegman
- Secretary – Barbara LaVerdi
- Treasurer – Oksana (Sandy) Dominach

Directors:

- Richard Sands (chairman of the board)
- Virginia (Ginny) A. Clark
- Lauren Dixon
- Oksana (Sandy) Dominach
- Asher Flaum
- Bill Goodrich
- George W. Hamlin IV
- Tim Jones
- Mary Krause
- Diana Lauria
- James A. Locke III, Esq.
- Dr. Barbara Risser
- Ginny Ryan
- Philip H. Yawman

== See also ==
- List of contemporary amphitheatres
