= Kristen Barnhisel =

American winemaker

- Born: Santa Rosa, California
- Occupation: Winemaker
- Known for: Pinot noir and Cabernet Sauvignon

Kristen Barnhisel is an American winemaker. She is Quality Control manager at Inglenook. She specializes in making pinot noir and Cabernet Sauvignon wines.

== Personal life and education ==
Kristen Barnhisel was raised in Santa Rosa, California in the United States. Her mother was a microbiologist who worked at Simi Winery. Her father made wine at the family home. Barnhisel attended the University of California, San Diego. While in school, she studied Italian literature and biology. She also attended the University of California, Davis, where she obtained her master's degree in enology.

== Career ==
Barnhisel worked at Ruffino in Italy, making her the first woman and first American to work there during harvest season. She has worked at wineries in California, Washington, and South Africa. In 1997, she started as enologist at Columbia Crest. She also worked at Jordan Vineyard & Winery and Belvedere. She started working at Handley Cellars in 2004. She worked as co-winemaker with Milla Handley until 2012. She was previously the Quality Control Manager for Inglenook but is now one of the leaders of J.Lohr's white wine programs. She has been in this role since 2015. Barnhisel currently serves as a director for the American Society for Enology and Viticulture.
