= Finger Lakes Community College =

Public college in Canandaigua, New York, US

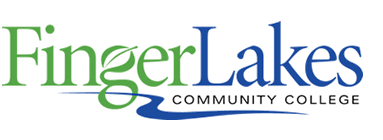
- Motto: Success. It's in Our Nature.
- Type: Public community college
- Established: 1965; 61 years ago
- Parent institution: State University of New York
- Academic affiliations: National Junior College Athletic Association, Region III, Mid-State Athletic Conference, National Collegiate Honors Council
- President: Robert K. Nye
- Undergraduates: 6,394 (fall 2025)
- Location: Canandaigua, New York, U.S. 42.8724°N 77.2429°W
- Campus: Suburban 250 acres (1.0 km^{2})
- Colors: Blue and green
- Nickname: Lakers
- Mascot: Flick the Lake Monster
- Website: www.flcc.edu

Finger Lakes Community College (FLCC) is a public community college in Canandaigua, New York. It is affiliated with the State University of New York and sponsored by Ontario County. The main campus is just east of the City of Canandaigua, with additional campus centers in Victor, Geneva, and Newark to serve the needs of Ontario County, Wayne County, Yates County and Seneca County in the Finger Lakes region of New York.

== History ==
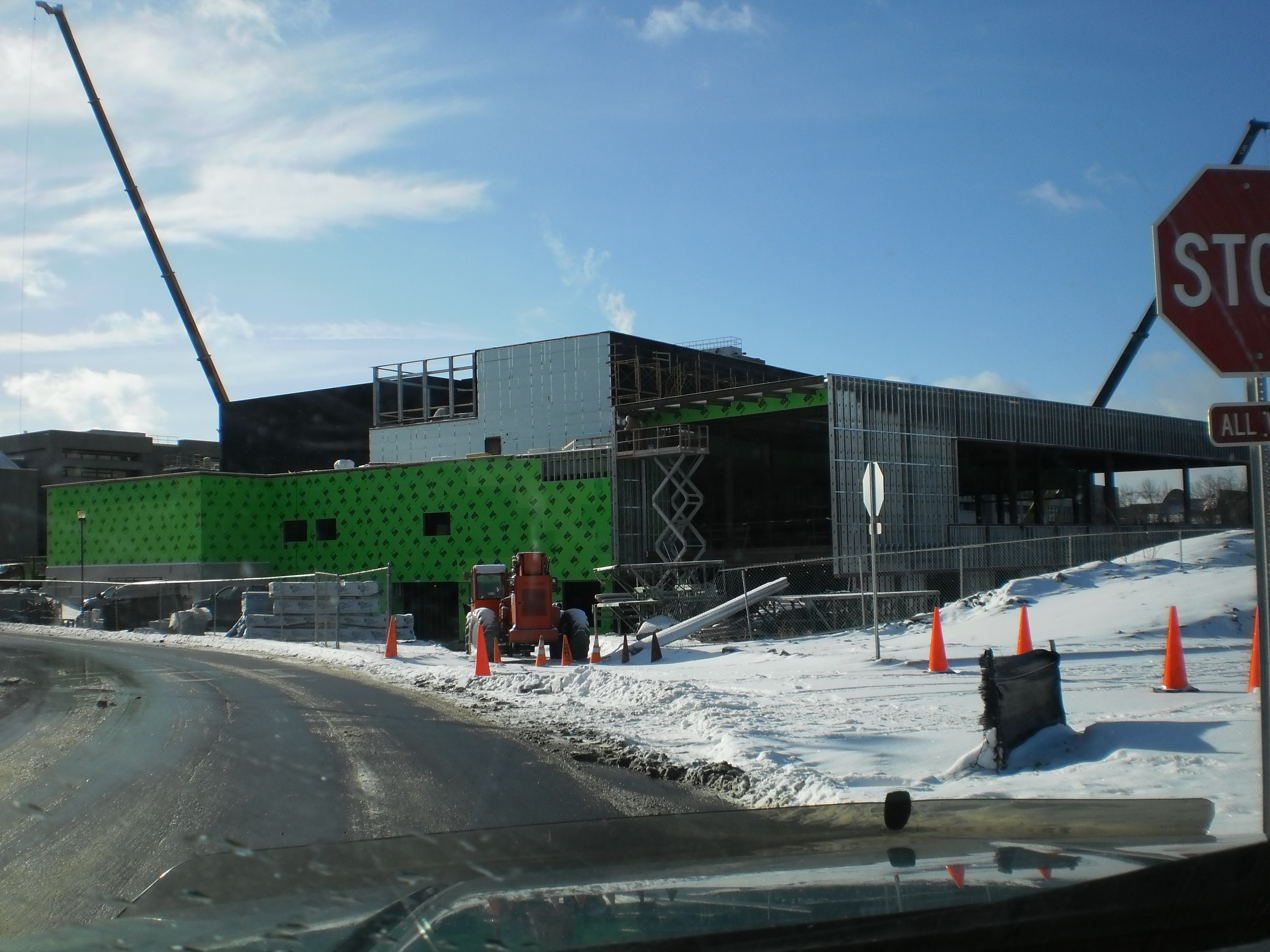
Construction of the new student life center and cafeteria

Finger Lakes Community College was established in 1965 and opened in 1967 as the Community College of the Finger Lakes (CCFL) in a storefront "campus" in Canandaigua, NY. The college now rests on 250 acres (1.0 km^{2}) of park-like land just outside Canandaigua, and is home to the Constellation Brands – Marvin Sands Performing Arts Center (CMAC). The college now has affiliated housing in the 356 bed Suites at Laker Landing, adjacent to the campus. In Fall 2010, FLCC's headcount enrollment was 6,935 the highest in its history.

In July 2009, FLCC received a million-dollar gift from Constellation Brands and the Sands Family, the largest gift in the school's history. The main road leading to the campus was renamed Marvin Sands Drive in honor of Marvin Sands, the Sands' family patriarch and the Sands' family's dedication to FLCC and the region. In fall 2009, FLCC named another "loop" road Laker Lane after the college's athletic teams; it connects Marvin Sands Drive and the "D" parking lot.

=== Expansion ===
Construction of the Student Life Center began in early 2010; and opened in spring of 2012. The new building is 78,000 square feet (7,200 m^{2}) and is a LEED certified green building housing the new 400-seat cafeteria, One-Stop (enrollment services) center, and bookstore, as well as the college's first auditorium (not including the CMAC), which seats 410. The upper floors of the original building have been renovated into classrooms and music recording technology spaces as part of the approximately $45 million project.

Enrollment in 2024–2025 was 6,025.

=== Presidents ===
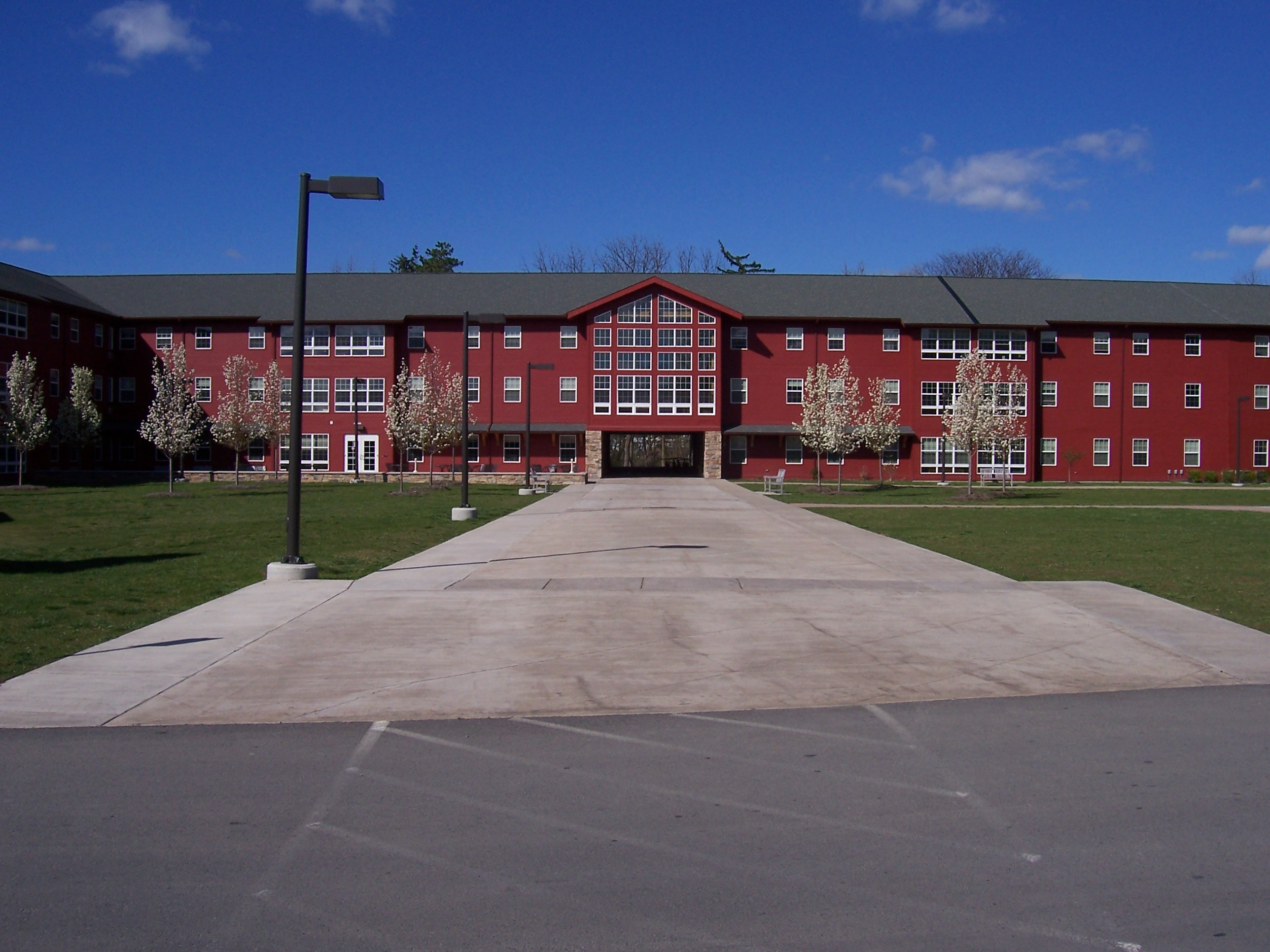
FLCC's dormitories

Presidents of the college
Name	Title	Tenure
Roy I. Satre	President	1967 – August 3, 1971
Charles J. Meder	Interim president President	August 1971 – June 1972; June 1972 – July 1992
Daniel T. Hayes	President	July 1992 – June 2007
Barbara G. Risser	President	August 2007 - August 2016
Robert K. Nye	President	July 1, 2016 – present°

== Academics ==
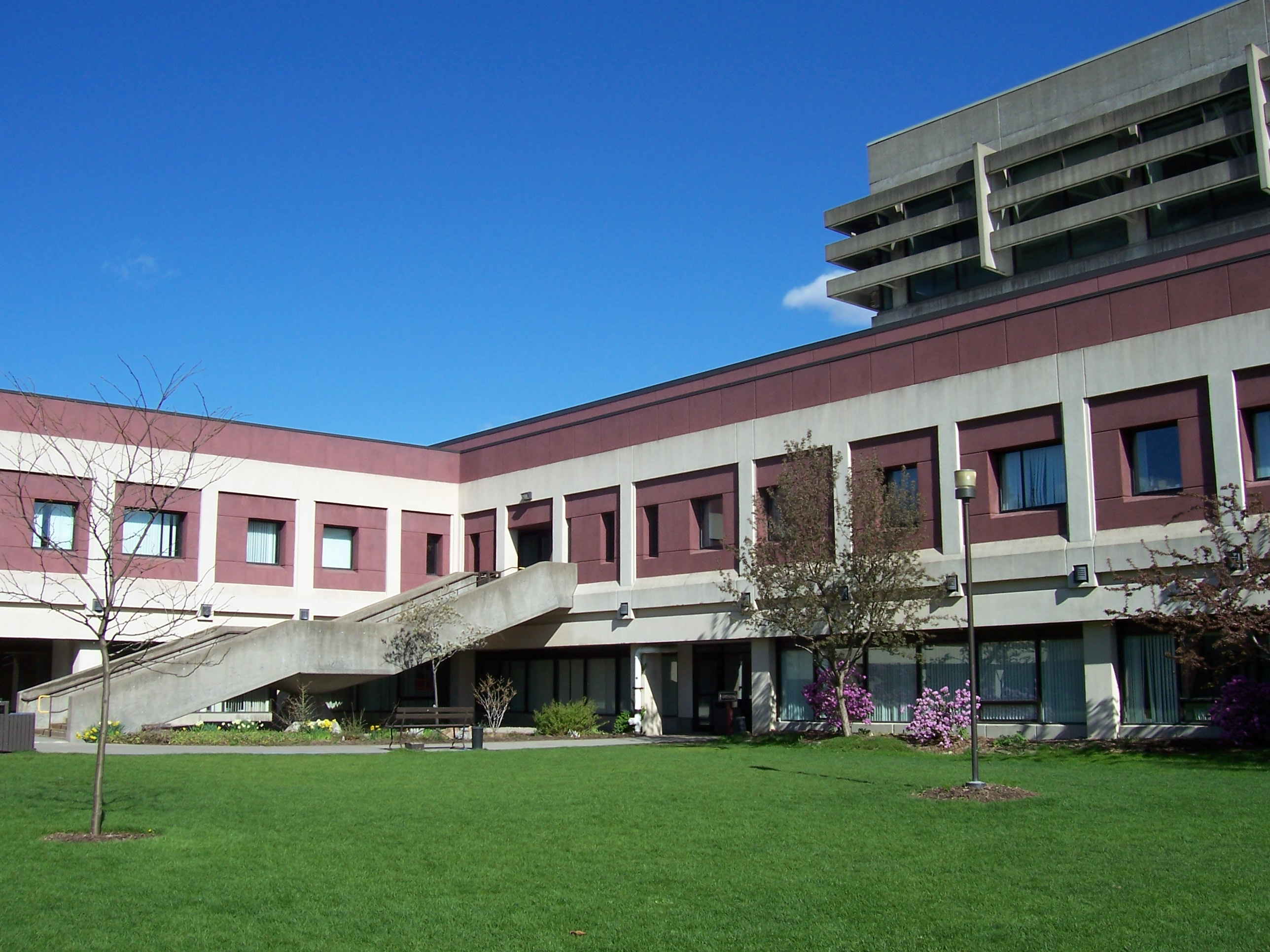
Academic complex courtyard

FLCC is accredited by the Commission on Higher Education of the Middle States Association of Colleges and Schools, and the National League for Nursing. All programs of instruction are registered with the Office of Higher Education of the New York State Education department.

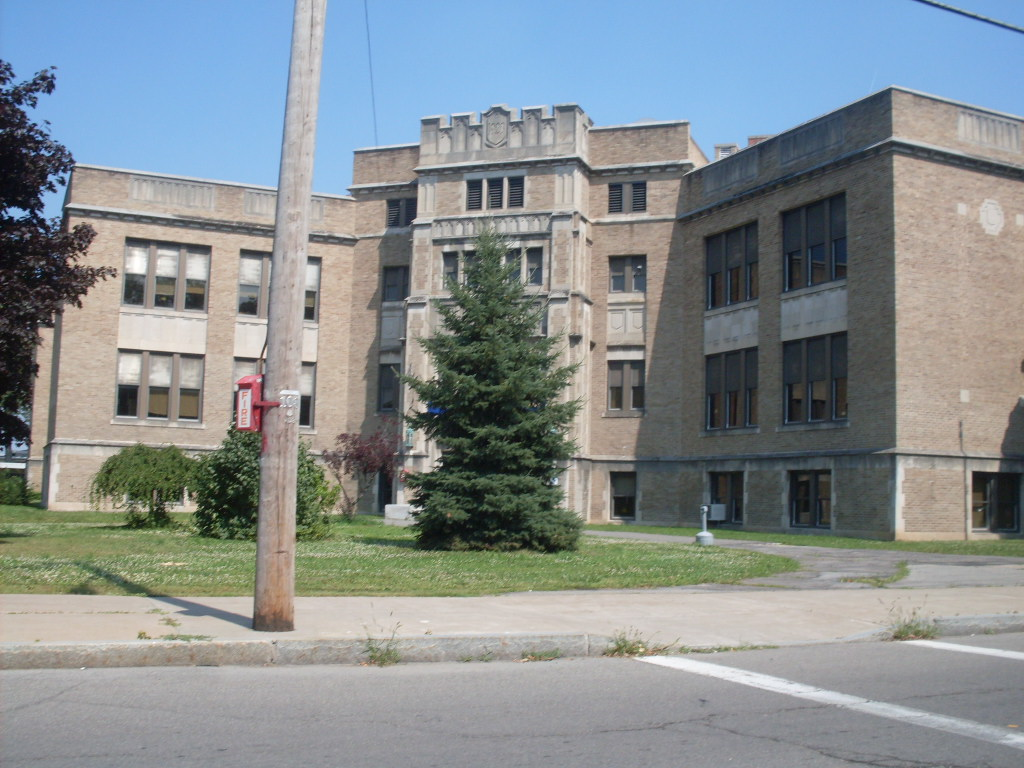
FLCC's Geneva Campus

Finger Lakes Community College also operates the Muller Field Station at the southern end of Honeoye Lake which serves as an outdoor education facility, the East Hill Campus, in Naples, New York, and the FLCC Viticulture and Wine Center in Geneva, New York.

== Athletics ==
The Lakers are a non-scholarship member of the National Junior College Athletic Association (NJCAA), Division III, and the Mid-State Athletic Conference, Finger Lakes Community College competes against two-year institutions throughout the state.

Teams compete in:

- Men's Division III Baseball
- Women's Division III Basketball
- Men's Division III Basketball
- Women's Division III Cross Country
- Men's Division III Cross Country
- Men's Division III Lacrosse
- Women's Division III Soccer
- Men's Division III Soccer
- Women's Division III Track & Field
- Mens Division III Track & Field
- Women's Division III Softball
- Women's Division III Volleyball
- Men's Division III Volleyball
- Esports
- Woodsmen
