= The Harley School =

Coordinates: 43°7′12″N 77°32′57″W

- Harley

Location
- 1981 Clover Street; Rochester, New York 14618; United States

Information
- Type: Independent, college preparatory school
- Motto: Become What Thou Art
- Established: 1917; 109 years ago
- Founder: Harriet Bentley
- Headmaster: Dr. Ryan Kimmet
- Grades: Nursery - 12th
- Campus: Suburban
- Colors: Green and white
- Mascot: Wolves
- Accreditation: Institute for Independent Education and National Association of Independent Education
- ACT average: 26 (class of 2019)
- Yearbook: The Comet
- Avg. SAT: 1317 (Class of 2023)
- Student:Teacher Ratio: 7:1
- Annual Tuition: $15,000-$26,000 (Nursery-Grade 12)
- Website: harleyschool.org

The Harley School is a college preparatory, independent day school in Rochester, New York, United States.

== History ==
Founded in 1917 by Harriet Bentley, The Harley School was first called “The Children’s University School of Rochester.” The name Harley comes from the first three letters of her first name and the last three letters of her last name.

John H. Niemeyer was headmaster at the school prior to becoming president of Bank Street College of Education.

== Campus ==
The school is located in the suburb of Brighton. The 25-acre (10 ha) campus is composed of a main building housing all divisions, an athletic center known as the Fieldhouse, and The Commons. The grounds hold two soccer fields, baseball/softball fields, indoor/outdoor tennis courts, a playground for Lower School students, an aquatic center with an adjacent fitness room (established in 2019), and an outdoor area for Middle School students. The grounds are bordered by Allens Creek business park on one side.

A distinctive element of the building is the arts wing with studios for each division including spaces for glassblowing and pottery.

The Commons, opened in 2014, is a 15,000-square-foot structure earning its status as a “living building” because it generates its own energy, heats and cools with renewable nontoxic resources, captures and utilizes water and carbon in its greenhouse, and operates efficiently using students as the “brains” or controls for managing its operations. Also housed in The Commons are the Briggs Center for Civic Engagement, Center for Mindfulness and Empathy Education (CMEE), a design lab and maker space, and the Middle School Science Center. Students of all ages use The Commons and it functions as the hub of Harley's STEM education.

== Education ==
The average class size is 8 students and 62% of the faculty hold advanced degrees. The faculty averages 12 years of teaching experience. In 2016, five students gained National Merits status. Classes are taught in the traditional fields of history, English, mathematics, science, and foreign languages. All students are required to take three years of a foreign language before graduating. For foreign language requirements, Spanish, French, and Latin may be taken by students. The school offers many electives, including podcasting, glassblowing, writer's workshop, drawing and painting, ceramics, Ancient Greek, photography, a training kitchen and many others.

In May 2018, 98 Upper School students took 197 Advanced Placement examinations; 85% scored 3 or better. Harley's 2019 students averaged 0.74 points higher than the national average (1-5 AP Scale) across all AP exams offered.

== Students ==
The school has about 500 students in grades Pre-K through Grade 12. Students come from 33 different school districts, make up a student body with 32% ethnic diversity, and 50% are on some level of financial aid. The school has 100% graduation and 100% of students gain 4-year college acceptance.

== Community service ==
All students at The Harley School participate in community service. Headed by faculty member Sybil Prince, the hospice program allows students the opportunity to offer palliative care both locally and as far away as Belize and India. Harley is also home to the Horizons program, a six-week summer enrichment program for urban children of limited financial means in grades 1–8. Initiated in 1995 with 24 students, the Horizons program has grown to an enrollment of 107 in 2008.

== Traditions ==
The Harley School maintains many traditions, such as its annual Candlelight Pan-Religious ceremony, and May Day, when school is dismissed early to allow students to interact outdoors. Other important traditions include the Halloween Parade, the Holiday Feast, the Scottish Exchange program, Lower School Pageant, the 2nd grade overnight, and the acorn ceremony. Most recently, the student body with assistance from the White Key Club, has spearheaded a campaign to begin building houses for Habitat for Humanity.

== Student clubs and organizations ==
The school has a considerable number of clubs, especially in the Upper School. Students are able to freely propose the formation of new clubs. Prominent clubs include: Key Club, Math Team, Ski Club, Student Council, FJBLGB and SOCA.

== Student athletics ==
=== Interscholastic leagues ===
New York State Public High School Athletic Association (NYSPHSAA)

Section V Athletics

Finger Lakes High School Athletic Association (FLHSAA)

=== Sports teams ===
The athletics program at Harley partners with Allendale Columbia School, another private college preparatory school in the area, to create a larger, more competitive athletic program that can participate in many different sports at many different levels. Before the union, Harley's team mascot was a tiger. The combined Harley and Allendale-Columbia teams, frequently referred to as HAC, originally competed as the Harley Allendale-Columbia Braves. In 1997, students of both schools voted to change the team name from the Braves to the Wolves. Team supporters are known as the Wolfpack.

HAC fields teams in 19 different varsity sports and have won Section Five championships in twelve of those 19 sports. In 2017, HAC girls golf debuts as a varsity program.

The athletic program has been very successful in the Finger Lakes High School Athletic Association and normally competes in the West Division with like-size schools. Harley requires students to participate in one athletic sport a year in Grades 9 and 10, and strongly encourages participation in 11th and 12th grade as well.

Interscholastic Athletic Teams
Sport	Level	Season	Gender
Baseball	JV, M	Spring	Boys'
Basketball	V, JV, M	Winter	Boys', Girls'
Bowling	V	Winter	Boys', Girls'
Cross-Country	V, JV, M	Fall	Boys', Girls'
Golf	V, JV	Fall	Boys', Girls' (varsity only)
Soccer	V, JV, MD	Fall	Boys', Girls'
Softball	V, JV, MD	Spring	Girls'
Swimming	V, M	Winter	Boys', Girls'
Tennis	V, JV, M	Fall (Girls'), Spring (Boys')	Boys', Girls'
Track (outdoor)	V, JV, M	Spring	Boys', Girls'
Volleyball	V, JV, M	Fall	Girls'

V = Varsity, JV = Junior Varsity, M = Modified

=== Athletic accomplishments ===
1982-2017 Harley Allendale Columbia Section V Championships (listed by school year, incomplete before 2007)
Year	Team	Class
2017	Girls Track and Field	D
2017	Boys Swimming and Diving	D
2016	Girls X-Country	D
2015	Girls X-Country	D
2015	Girls Track and Field	D
2014	Girls Tennis	B
2013	Girls Volleyball	D
2013	Girls Tennis	B
2013	Boys Tennis	BB
2012	Girls Track and Field	D
2012	Girls Basketball	C
2011	Girls Tennis	B
2011	Girls Volleyball	DD
2011	Boys Tennis	BB
2010	Girls Tennis	B
2010	Boys X-Country	D
2010	Girls Volleyball	DD
2010	Boys Tennis	BB
2009	Boys Tennis	BB
2009	Boys Basketball	C
2008	Boys Tennis	BB
2007	Boys Tennis	BB
1999	Boys Tennis	D
1998	Boys Tennis	D
1997	Boys Tennis	D
1988	Boys Tennis	D
1987	Boys Tennis	D
1986	Boys Basketball	C
1986	Boys Tennis	D
1985	Boys Tennis	D
1984	Boys Tennis	D
1982	Boys Tennis	D

== Notable alumni ==
- Eric G. Blackman
- Jonathan Caulkins
- Andrew Rea
- Emilio Rojas, rapper
- Rob Sands
- Richard Sands
- Kenneth Schwartz
- Magnus Sheffield
