= Mike Sands =

Mike Sands or Michael Sands may refer to:

- Michael Sands (media) (1945–2012), American model, actor and media consultant
- Mike Sands (sprinter) (born 1953), Bahamian former sprint athlete and athletics official
- Mike Sands (ice hockey) (born 1963), Canadian former ice hockey player
- Michael Sands, Jr. (born 1985), Bahamian sprinter and son of Michael
