= Richard Sands (businessman) =

American businessman (born 1950/1951)

- Born: 1950 or 1951 (age 74–75)
- Occupation: businessman
- Title: Vice Chairman, Constellation Brands
- Spouse: Jennifer
- Parent: Marvin Sands
- Relatives: Rob Sands (brother)

Richard Sands (born 1950/1951) is an American billionaire businessman, and the chairman of Constellation Brands, a Fortune 500 beer, wine and spirits company founded by his father Marvin Sands.

== Biography ==
His father, Marvin Sands, founded the Canandaigua Wine Company in 1945, aged 21. By 1980, its annual sales topped $50 million, and was renamed Constellation Brands in 2000, and has acquired numerous companies including Robert Mondavi wine and Svedka vodka. In 2013, it acquired the US rights to Grupo Modelo beers including Modelo and Corona.

In 2016, along with his brother and mother, "Mickey", donated $61 million to the Rochester Area Community Foundation, the single largest gift in its history.

== Personal life ==
Sands lives in Canandaigua, New York.
