= Casa Noble =

Brand of tequila

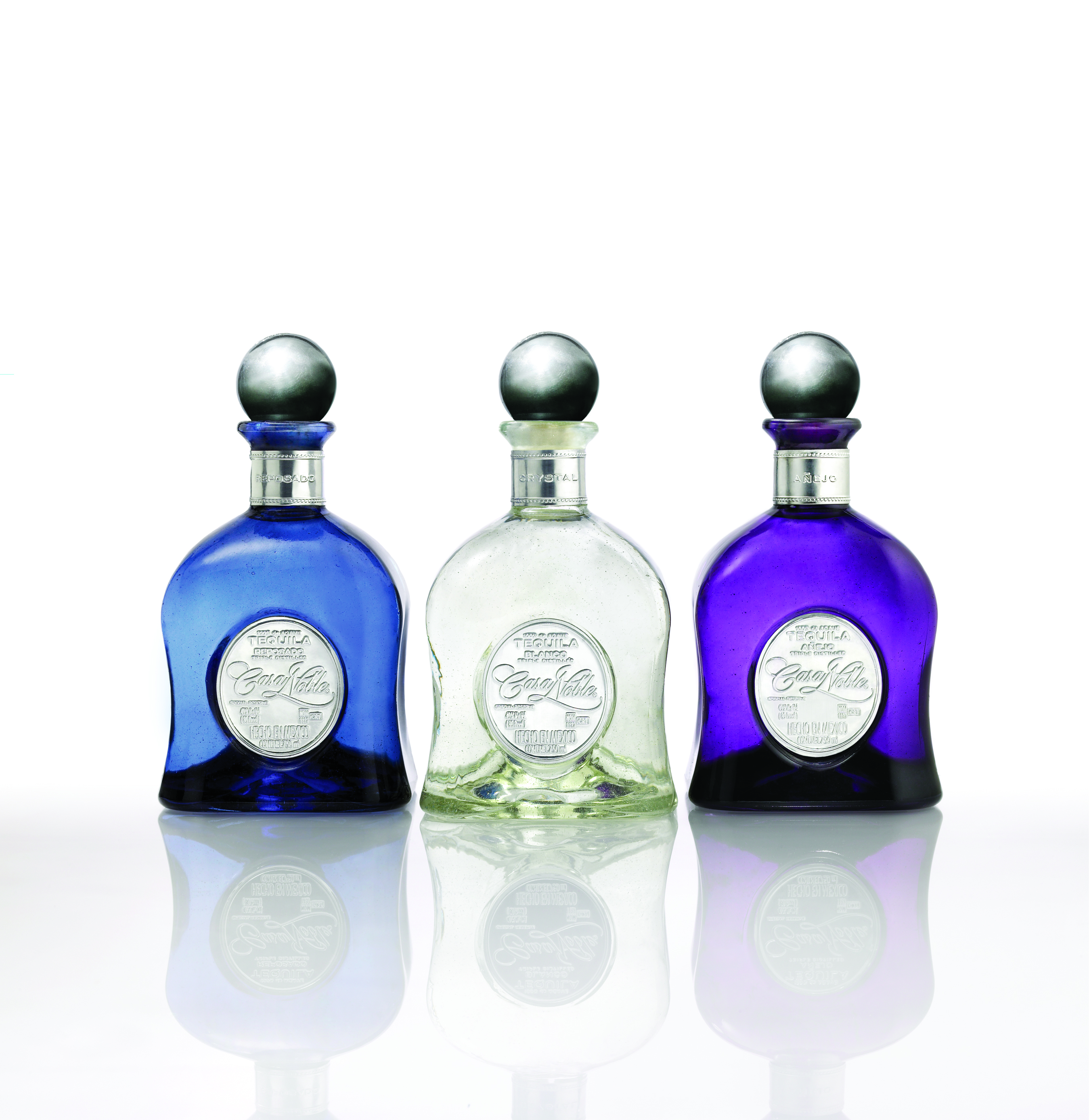
- Type: Tequila
- Manufacturer: Casa Noble Tequila Company
- Distributor: Constellation Brands Inc.
- Country of origin: Mexico
- Introduced: 1776
- Proof (US): 80
- Variants: Añejo, Reposado, Crystal (Blanco)

Casa Noble is a brand of premium 100% blue agave tequila produced by the Casa Noble Tequila Company. It is a CCOF certified organic tequila. Casa Noble is distributed in the United States by Constellation Brands Inc. The tequila is made from estate-grown agaves cooked in traditional stone ovens; these are naturally fermented and distilled three times. Casa Noble Reposado and Añejo are aged in White French Oak.

Casa Noble has been the winner of many accolades including "double gold winner" of the San Francisco World Spirit Competition in 2007 and 2009 and "best tequila" in Mexico by Academia Mexicana del Tequila.

== History ==
The Casa Noble Tequila Company started as a tequila producer in the late 1700s in the region of Tequila, Jalisco. By 1800, it had a daily production capacity of 10 barrels per day. Casa Noble is made by the well-known Cofradia distillery which remains outside the town of Tequila; owned by Constellation Brands.

== Awards ==
- 2006 Silver Medal Packaging Winner Reposado
- 2006 Silver Medal Packaging Winner Blanco
- 2006 Bronze Medal Packaging Winner Anejo
- 2004 Silver Medal Reposado
- 2004 Bronze Medal Anejo
- 2004 Bronze Medal Crystal
- 2005 Silver Medal Reposado
- 2005 Silver Medal Crystal
- 2006 Silver Medal Reposado
- 2006 Silver Medal Blanco
- 2006 Bronze Medal Anejo
- 2007 Double Gold Medal Anejo
- 2007 Silver Medal Reposado
- 2007 Silver Medal Crystal
- 2008 Gold Medal Reposado
- 2008 Bronze Medal Crystal
- 2009 Double Gold Medal Anejo
- 2009 Bronze Medal Reposado
- 2009 Bronze Medal Crystal
- 2011 Gold Medal Blanco
- 2011 Bronze Medal Reposado
- 2011 Silver Medal Anejo
