= Rob Sands =

American businessman (born 1958/59)

- Born: 1958 or 1959 (age 67–68)
- Education: The Harley School
- Alma mater: Skidmore College; Pace University
- Occupation: Businessman
- Title: CEO, Constellation Brands, 2007-2019; Executive Chair, Constellation Brands
- Term: 2019-present
- Predecessor: Richard Sands
- Spouse: Pamela Kaufman
- Parent: Marvin Sands
- Relatives: Richard Sands (brother)

Robert Scott Sands (born 1958/59) is an American billionaire businessman, and the executive chair and former CEO of Constellation Brands, a Fortune 500 beer, wine and spirits company founded by his father Marvin Sands.

== Early life ==
Robert Scott Sands is the son of Marvin Sands, and has an older brother, Richard Sands.

He grew up in Canandaigua, New York, and was educated at The Harley School in Rochester, New York, graduating in 1976. Sands earned a bachelor's degree in philosophy from Skidmore College, followed by a juris doctor from Pace University.

== Career ==
Marvin Sands founded the Canandaigua Wine Company in 1945, aged 21. By 1980, its annual sales topped $50 million, was renamed Constellation Brands in 2000, and has acquired numerous companies including Robert Mondavi wine and Svedka vodka. In 2013, it acquired the US rights to Grupo Modelo beers including Modelo and Corona.

Sands started his career at the law firm of Harter Secrest & Emery LLP in Rochester, New York, and worked there for two years before joining the family business as general counsel in 1986.

Sands was CEO of Constellation Brands from 2007 to 2019, succeeding his brother, Richard Sands. In October 2018, he became the executive chairman of the company.

Sands is a board member of Rochester General Health Systems, Thompson Hospital, Rochester Business Alliance, and chairman of the New York Wine and Culinary Center.

In 2016, along with his brother and mother, "Mickey", donated $61 million to the Rochester Area Community Foundation, the single largest gift in its history.

== Personal life ==
In 1986, Sands married Jessica Nancy Zingesser. Sands is married to Pamela Sands (nee Kaufman) and lives in Canandaigua, New York.
