= Rochester Area Community Foundation =

Community foundation serving the Rochester, New York region

- Abbreviation: RACF
- Founded: September 18, 1972; 54 years ago
- Type: Community foundation (501(c)(3))
- Tax ID no.: 23-7250641
- Purpose: Philanthropy, grantmaking, community development
- Location: 500 East Avenue, Rochester, New York, U.S.
- Region served: Eight counties in the Finger Lakes region
- Key people: Simeon Banister (President and CEO)
- Revenue: $47.9 million (FY 2024)
- Endowment: $490 million (2024)
- Website: racf.org

Rochester Area Community Foundation (RACF) is a community foundation headquartered in Rochester, New York, that manages charitable funds and distributes grants across an eight-county region in the Finger Lakes area of upstate New York. Founded in 1972, it administers more than 1,550 funds and has distributed more than $780 million in grants and scholarships since its inception. As of 2024, the foundation held approximately $490 million in total assets.

== History ==
=== Founding ===
The foundation was incorporated on September 18, 1972, as the Greater Rochester Community Foundation of the Genesee Valley, largely through the efforts of insurance salesman Joe U. Posner and a group of community organizers. It was overseen by a 21-member volunteer board and opened its first office at 315 Alexander Street in Rochester. In 1973, Nancy Dillman Peck was hired as the first executive director on a part-time basis, and the foundation received initial gifts totaling $67,960.

The organization was renamed the Rochester Area Foundation in 1974 and adopted its current name, Rochester Area Community Foundation, in 1997. In 2007, it rebranded publicly as "the Community Foundation" while retaining its legal name.

=== Growth ===
The foundation reached $1 million in assets by 1979, $20 million by 1989, and $100 million by 1999. Jennifer Leonard, who became the third executive director in 1993 after serving as vice president of the California Community Foundation, led the organization for nearly 30 years, during which time assets grew from $32 million to more than $600 million at their peak and permanently endowed assets exceeded $400 million.

In 2016, the Sands family—Richard Sands, Rob Sands, and Mickey Sands of Constellation Brands—made a $61 million gift to establish the Sands Family Supporting Foundation, the largest donation in the foundation's history. Other major gifts include a $14 million donation from Ron and Donna Fielding in 2001, which was made anonymously and publicly revealed in 2012.

The foundation's service area was expanded from six to eight counties in 2011.

== Activities ==
=== Grantmaking ===
The foundation distributes grants to nonprofit organizations across the counties of Genesee, Livingston, Monroe, Ontario, Orleans, Seneca, Wayne, and Yates. In fiscal year 2024, the foundation awarded $29.3 million in 515 grants. Its strategic priorities include closing academic and opportunity gaps, advancing racial and ethnic equity, supporting arts and culture, preserving historical assets, promoting environmental sustainability, and advancing successful aging.

=== Scholarships ===
The foundation administers more than 125 scholarship programs. In 2025, it awarded 305 scholarships totaling over $1.3 million.

=== Giving circles ===
The foundation hosts four grantmaking giving circles: the Rochester Women's Giving Circle, the LGBT+ Giving Circle, the Latino Giving Circle, and the Black Giving Collective. In 2024, these circles collectively awarded more than $230,000.

== Notable programs ==
=== ACT Rochester ===
In 2009, the foundation launched ACT Rochester, a community indicators initiative operated in partnership with United Way of Greater Rochester that tracks more than 100 measures of community well-being across the region.

=== Rochester-Monroe Anti-Poverty Initiative ===
Research conducted by foundation staff, including a series of reports on poverty authored by Edward J. Doherty, found that Rochester's poverty rate stood at 32.9 percent and its childhood poverty rate at 50.1 percent—the highest among 18 benchmark cities studied. These findings prompted the creation of the Rochester-Monroe Anti-Poverty Initiative (RMAPI), a community-wide effort involving nearly 1,000 participants to reduce poverty by 50 percent over 15 years.

=== North Star Coalition ===
In November 2021, the foundation launched the North Star Coalition, a group of more than 200 organizations across nine counties working to ensure equitable distribution of more than $800 million in federal pandemic relief funds, including allocations from the CARES Act and the American Rescue Plan Act. The coalition partnered with the Urban Institute, the Brookings Institution, and ACT Rochester.

=== COVID-19 response ===
In 2020, the foundation launched the Community Crisis Fund in partnership with United Way, raising more than $2.3 million. An additional COVID Recovery and Response Fund distributed nearly $7 million with a focus on equity and inclusion.

== Leadership ==
The foundation has had four chief executives since its founding:

1. Nancy Dillman Peck (1973–1977), first executive director
2. Linda Shapiro Weinstein (1977–1993)
3. Jennifer Leonard (1993–2022), under whose tenure assets grew from $32 million to over $600 million
4. Simeon Banister (2022–present)

Banister, a Rochester native and graduate of North Carolina Central University and Princeton Theological Seminary, joined the foundation in 2017 as a program officer and was promoted to executive vice president before being named the fourth president and CEO on October 1, 2022.

Notable board chairs include Malinda Fischer, the first woman to chair the board (1984), and Ruth H. Scott, the first African American board chair (1992).

== Location ==
The foundation is headquartered at 500 East Avenue in Rochester's East Avenue Preservation District, a historic home built by William Ellwanger that the foundation purchased in 1997.

== Connection to state government ==
New York State Senator Jeremy Cooney served on the foundation's board and governance committee prior to his election to the New York State Senate in 2020. In 2022, Cooney partnered with the foundation and the Shore Foundation to distribute free refurbished laptops to community and neighborhood business associations in the City of Rochester. In 2025, Cooney's Reinvesting in Organizations that Care (ROC) Grants program directed $1 million in state funding to 12 local nonprofits, with RACF president Simeon Banister praising the initiative.

== See also ==
- Community foundation
- Rochester, New York
