= Marvin Sands =

American businessman (1924–1999)

- Born: Marvin L. Sands; 1924
- Died: 1999 (aged 74–75)
- Education: University of North Carolina at Chapel Hill
- Occupation: Businessman
- Known for: Founder, Constellation Brands
- Title: CEO, Constellation Brands
- Term: 1945–1993
- Successor: Richard Sands
- Parent: Mordecai E. Sands
- Relatives: Richard Sands; Rob Sands

Marvin L. Sands (1924 – August 28, 1999) was an American businessman, and the founder and CEO of Constellation Brands, a Fortune 500 beer, wine and spirits company.

== Early life ==
Marvin Sands was the son of Mordecai E. Sands, who was a partner in a winery in Long Island City, Queens, New York since 1932. He was of Jewish descent.

Sands earned a bachelor's degree from the University of North Carolina at Chapel Hill, and served as an ensign in the US Navy during World War II.

== Career ==
Sands founded the Canandaigua Wine Company in 1945 at age 21.

Sands tried to establish a brand, and was unsuccessful with King Solomon kosher wine and an eponymous Sands brand. In 1954 he produced a "flaming-red blend of dessert wine" called Richard's Wild Irish Rose, named after his son Richard, and this grew to become more than 90% of their sales in the 1960s.

By 1980, annual sales topped $50 million. The company was renamed Constellation Brands in 2000. In 1987, he acquired the Manischewitz Wine Company and in 1988, received kosher certification for the brand from the Union of Orthodox Jewish Congregations of America. It has acquired several companies including Robert Mondavi wine and Svedka vodka.

Sands was the company's CEO from its inception until 1993, when he was succeeded by his son Richard Sands.

== Personal life ==
Sands lived in Canandaigua, New York with his wife Marilyn "Mickey" Sands. He had two sons, Richard Sands and Robert Sands; and a daughter Laurie Sands Stern (died 1995). He died on August 28, 1999; services were held at Temple B'rith Kodesh in Rochester, New York.

The Constellation Brands – Marvin Sands Performing Arts Center is named in his honor.
