= Robert Sands (artist) =

American designer (born 1943)

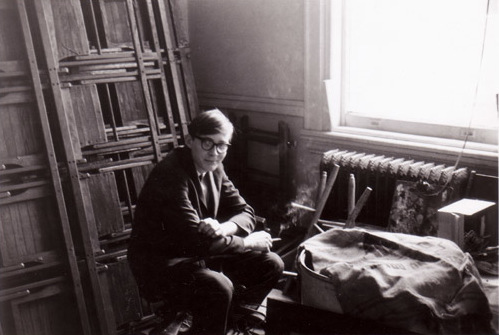
- Picture of Robert Sands
- Born: Robert Claire Sands Jr. September 15, 1943 (United States) Pittsburgh, Pennsylvania U.S.
- Education: Ivy School of Professional Arts
- Known for: Painting, Drawing, Graphic Design, Sculpture

Robert Sands (September 15, 1943 –) is an accomplished designer, painter and director from Pittsburgh, Pennsylvania. He studied painting and design at the Ivy School of Professional Art under Abe Weiner, Marie Kelly, Roy Hunter, and Everett Sturgeon.

Sands is the owner and founder of Terminal Graphics, a Pittsburgh-based design firm recognized both locally and internationally. His company specializes in imaginative and vibrant sets, lighting designs, large-scale entertainment presentations, advertising campaigns, electronic graphics and video/web productions. His designs have been procured by Wired, Allstate, GE Capital, Ford, National Baseball Hall of Fame, Heinz, and other clients.

Sands' private life is spent as a painter and fine artist. Most of his graphic designs have begun as hand-rendered images in acrylics, pastels, or pencil. During the 1990s, advancements in computer graphic design allowed for new adjustments to old renderings, and he embraced the computer as tool in advancing the possibilities of his work.
