= Michael Sands (media) =

- Born: Michael Jay Shapiro; December 14, 1945; Boston, Massachusetts
- Died: April 6, 2012 (aged 66) Los Angeles, California

Michael Sands (December 14, 1945 – April 6, 2012) was an American fashion print model and actor turned media consultant, representing clients such as George Lazenby, Michael Reagan, Gary Devore, Mr. Blackwell, and Kevin Federline.

== Biography ==
Sands acted in various roles, including in the Dennis DeYoung Music Video "Don't Wait for Heroes," and frequently discussed celebrity images in the national media. Through producing CelebrityDoctor.co in the late 1990s, Sands pioneered the trend for live TV/web screenings of face-lifts, most famously with Arabella Churchill.

The book The CIA in Hollywood by Tricia Jenkins reports that Sands supported the CIA in establishing a presence in Hollywood in the mid-1990s and even assisted in the capture of Abu Abbas, the terrorist behind the hijacking of the MS Achille Lauro cruise ship in 1985. Sands arranged for Abbas to be interviewed in Baghdad for a book and movie deal, and then gave the interview and Abbas's contact details to the FBI and CIA. US Special Forces captured Abbas in 2003.

In 2011 Sands was approached by the Utah family of Wassef Ali Hassoun over a $1m book and movie deal about the Marine corporal charged with desertion who allegedly faked his own kidnapping in Iraq.

Michael has one son, Nicholas Sands

== Death ==
On March 24, 2012, Sands started choking on free food sample in a Los Angeles deli. He was pronounced dead on the scene for five minutes, then revived and taken to Cedars Sinai hospital. At the hospital, Sands was placed in a medically induced coma to prevent inflammation of the brain. He died thirteen days later on April 6, 2012, at the age of sixty-seven.
