= Mike Sands (ice hockey) =

Canadian ice hockey player

- Born: April 6, 1963 (age 61); Mississauga, Ontario, Canada
- Height: 5 ft 9 in (175 cm)
- Weight: 150 lb (68 kg; 10 st 10 lb)
- Position: Goaltender
- Caught: Left
- Played for: Minnesota North Stars
- National team: Canada
- NHL draft: 31st overall, 1981; Minnesota North Stars
- Playing career: 1982–1989

Mike Sands (born April 6, 1963) is a Canadian former professional ice hockey goaltender who played six games in the National Hockey League with the Minnesota North Stars between 1984 and 1986. The rest of his career, which lasted from 1982 to 1989, was spent in the minor leagues.

== Early life ==
Sands was born in Mississauga, Ontario. As a youth, he played in the 1976 Quebec International Pee-Wee Hockey Tournament with a minor ice hockey team from Mississauga.

== Career ==
During his NHL career, Sands played for the Minnesota North Stars. He has since worked as an amateur scout for the Arizona Coyotes. He previously worked as director of amateur scouting for the Calgary Flames and for the NHL Central Scouting Bureau.

== Career statistics ==
=== Regular season and playoffs ===
			Regular season									Playoffs
Season	Team	League	GP	W	L	T	MIN	GA	SO	GAA	SV%	GP	W	L	MIN	GA	SO	GAA	SV%
1979–80	Streetsville Derbys	COJHL	20	—	—	—	1049	57	0	3.26	—	—	—	—	—	—	—	—	—
1979–80	Dixie Beehives	COJHL	4	2	1	—	220	12	1	3.55	—	—	—	—	—	—	—	—	—
1980–81	Sudbury Wolves	OHL	50	15	28	2	2789	236	0	5.08	—	—	—	—	—	—	—	—	—
1981–82	Sudbury Wolves	OHL	53	13	33	1	2854	265	1	5.57	—	—	—	—	—	—	—	—	—
1981–82	Nashville South Stars	CHL	7	3	3	1	380	26	0	4.11	.875	—	—	—	—	—	—	—	—
1982–83	Sudbury Wolves	OHL	43	11	27	0	2320	204	1	5.28	—	—	—	—	—	—	—	—	—
1982–83	Birmingham South Stars	CHL	4	0	4	0	169	14	0	4.97	.859	—	—	—	—	—	—	—	—
1983–84	Salt Lake Golden Eagles	CHL	23	7	12	1	1145	93	0	4.87	—	—	—	—	—	—	—	—	—
1984–85	Minnesota North Stars	NHL	3	0	3	0	139	14	0	6.05	.841	—	—	—	—	—	—	—	—
1984–85	Springfield Indians	AHL	46	23	17	3	2589	140	2	3.24	.892	—	—	—	—	—	—	—	—
1985–86	Springfield Indians	AHL	27	8	15	1	1490	94	0	3.79	.879	—	—	—	—	—	—	—	—
1986–87	Minnesota North Stars	NHL	3	0	2	0	163	12	0	4.43	.883	—	—	—	—	—	—	—	—
1986–87	Springfield Indians	AHL	19	4	10	0	1048	77	0	4.41	.863	—	—	—	—	—	—	—	—
1987–88	Kalamazoo Wings	IHL	3	0	2	1	184	16	0	5.22	—	—	—	—	—	—	—	—	—
1987–88	Baltimore Skipjacks	AHL	4	0	4	0	185	22	0	7.14	.832	—	—	—	—	—	—	—	—
1988–89	Canadian National Team	Intl	21	6	13	1	1012	75	0	4.45	—	—	—	—	—	—	—	—	—
NHL totals			6	0	5	0	302	26	0	5.18	.864	—	—	—	—	—	—	—	—

=== International ===
Year	Team	Event	GP	W	L	T	MIN	GA	SO	GAA	SV%
1983	Canada	WJC	5	—	—	—	240	13	0	3,25	—
Junior totals			5	—	—	—	240	13	0	3.25	—
