= Svedka =

Alcoholic Spirit

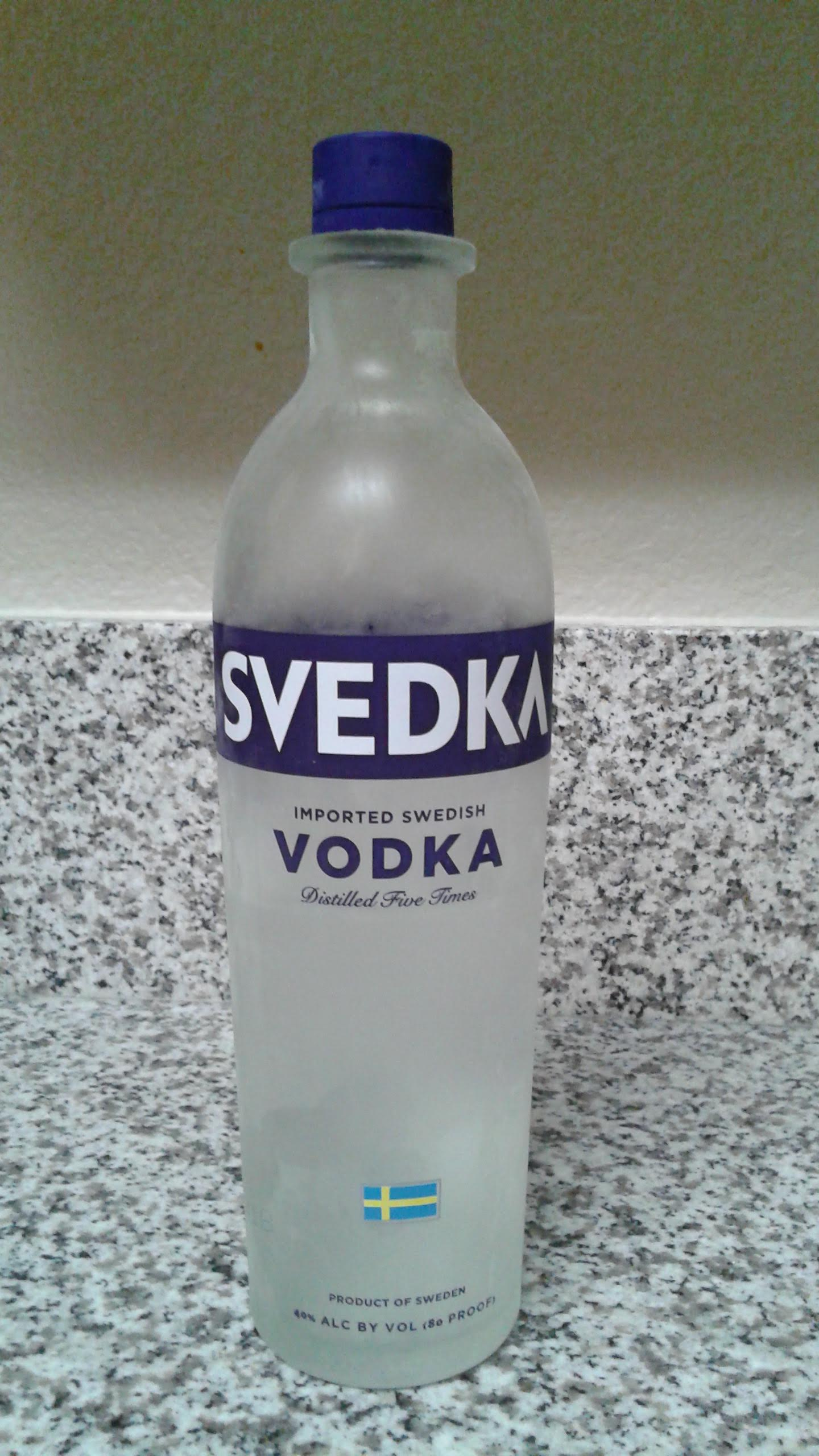
- Unflavored Svedka Vodka
- Type: Vodka
- Manufacturer: Constellation Brands (2007–24); Sazerac Company (2024–present)
- Introduced: 1998
- Proof (US): 80–100
- Website: www.svedka.com

Svedka is a bottom shelf brand of vodka produced in the United States owned by Sazerac Company. Its product name is a portmanteau of the words Sverige or svensk ("Sweden" and "Swedish" respectively in the Swedish language) and "vodka". As of 2026, it is produced from American corn and distilled four times.

Svedka Vodka was launched in 1998 by Guillaume Cuvelier, a former executive at Moët Hennessy. In March 2007, Constellation Brands acquired Svedka for US$384 million. In December 2024, the vodka brand was sold to Sazerac Company. In 2026, Svedka aired an AI-generated ad at Super Bowl LX featuring two robots drinking the brand's vodka. The ad was negatively received by viewers.

In the past, it was imported into US as 96% strength alcohol from Sweden and diluted and bottled in the US. In 2020, Swedish National Food Agency claimed that it may not be distributed as Swedish vodka because "Swedish vodka" is a protected designation according to European Union rules, and thus must meet certain requirements. The government agency believed that Lantmännen violates some of these requirements when the company transports the concentrated 96 percent alcohol to the United States to be diluted with water there. At a later time, Svedka moved the whole production process to the US without any announcement and removed the Swedish flag from the bottle.
