= Ruffino =

Italian wine producer

Coordinates: 44.0488243°N 8.0972229°E

- Location: Pontassieve (FI), Tuscany
- Founded: 1877
- Key people: Ilario Ruffino, Leopoldo Ruffino, Francesco Folonari and Italo Folonari
- Known for: Tuscan wines, prosecco, Riserva Ducale
- Varietals: Sangiovese, Cabernet Sauvignon, Syrah, Pinot Grigio, Glera
- Other products: Olive oil, Vin Santo, Grappa
- Distribution: International
- Website: www.ruffino.it

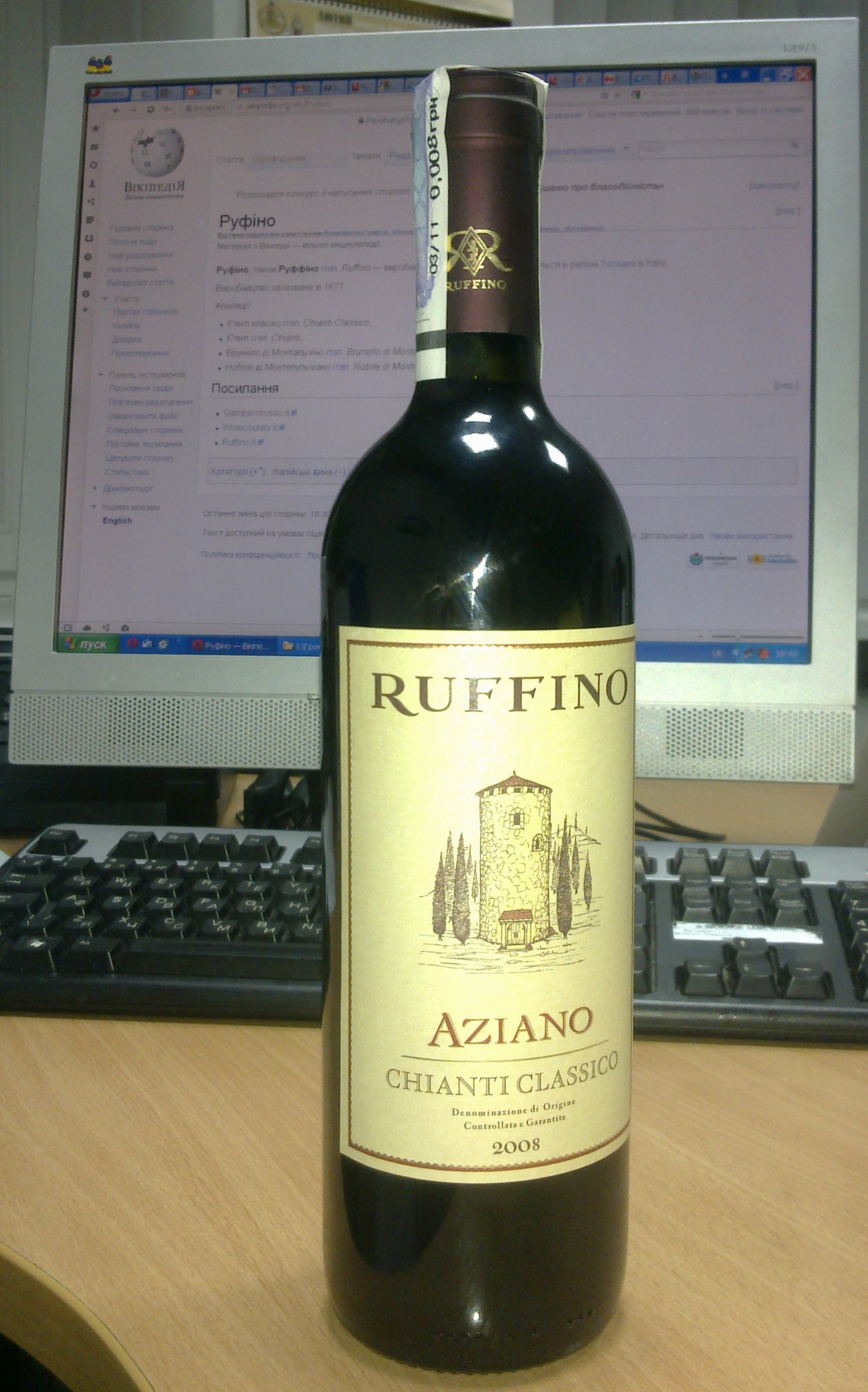
Ruffino Aziano Chianti Classico

Ruffino is a wine producer based in the Tuscany region of Italy. Founded in 1877, the winery was purchased by the Brescian Folonari family in 1913. In 1999 the Folonari business was split, with the brothers Paolo and Marco retaining the Ruffino name for their operation. In 2004, Constellation Brands purchased a 40% interest in Ruffino for an estimated $80 million.
