= New York State Route 35 (1927 – early 1940s) =

Former state highway in New York State

New York State Route 35
- Map of the Rochester area with NY 35 highlighted in red and NY 940H in blue

Route information
- Maintained by NYSDH
- Length: 41.38 mi (66.59 km)
- Existed: 1927–early 1940s

Major junctions
- West end: NY 36 in Wheatland
- US 15 in Rochester
- East end: US 104 in Ontario

Location
- Country: United States
- State: New York
- Counties: Monroe, Wayne

Highway system
- New York Highways; Interstate; US; State; Reference; Parkways
← NY 34B	→ NY 35

New York State Route 35 (NY 35) was a state highway in the Finger Lakes region of New York, in the United States. The western terminus of the route was at an intersection with NY 36 in the hamlet of Mumford within the town of Wheatland. Its eastern terminus was at a junction with U.S. Route 104 (US 104) in the hamlet of Ontario Center within the town of Ontario. NY 35 followed a mostly northeast–southwest routing across the counties of Monroe and Wayne and passed through downtown Rochester.

NY 35 was originally assigned in 1927 from Buffalo to Avon along what is now mostly US 20. It was extended northeastward to Ontario as part of the 1930 renumbering of state highways in New York (mostly along modern NY 383 and NY 286), then reconfigured on its southwestern end to terminate in Mumford c. 1938. NY 35 was split into NY 383 and NY 350 in the early 1940s, allowing the designation to be used again for a highway in Westchester County.

== Route description ==
The routing that follows is of NY 35's final alignment.

=== Mumford to Chili ===
The portion of NY 35 between the hamlet of Mumford in the town of Wheatland and the southwestern city line of Rochester followed an alignment identical to modern NY 383. The only differences were in the designations of the roads intersected. In Scottsville, NY 35 overlapped NY 251, which at the time continued northwest out of the village on what is now NY 386. Also, in Chili, NY 252 ended at NY 35 instead of continuing west, and NY 252A was designated as NY 198.

=== Rochester ===
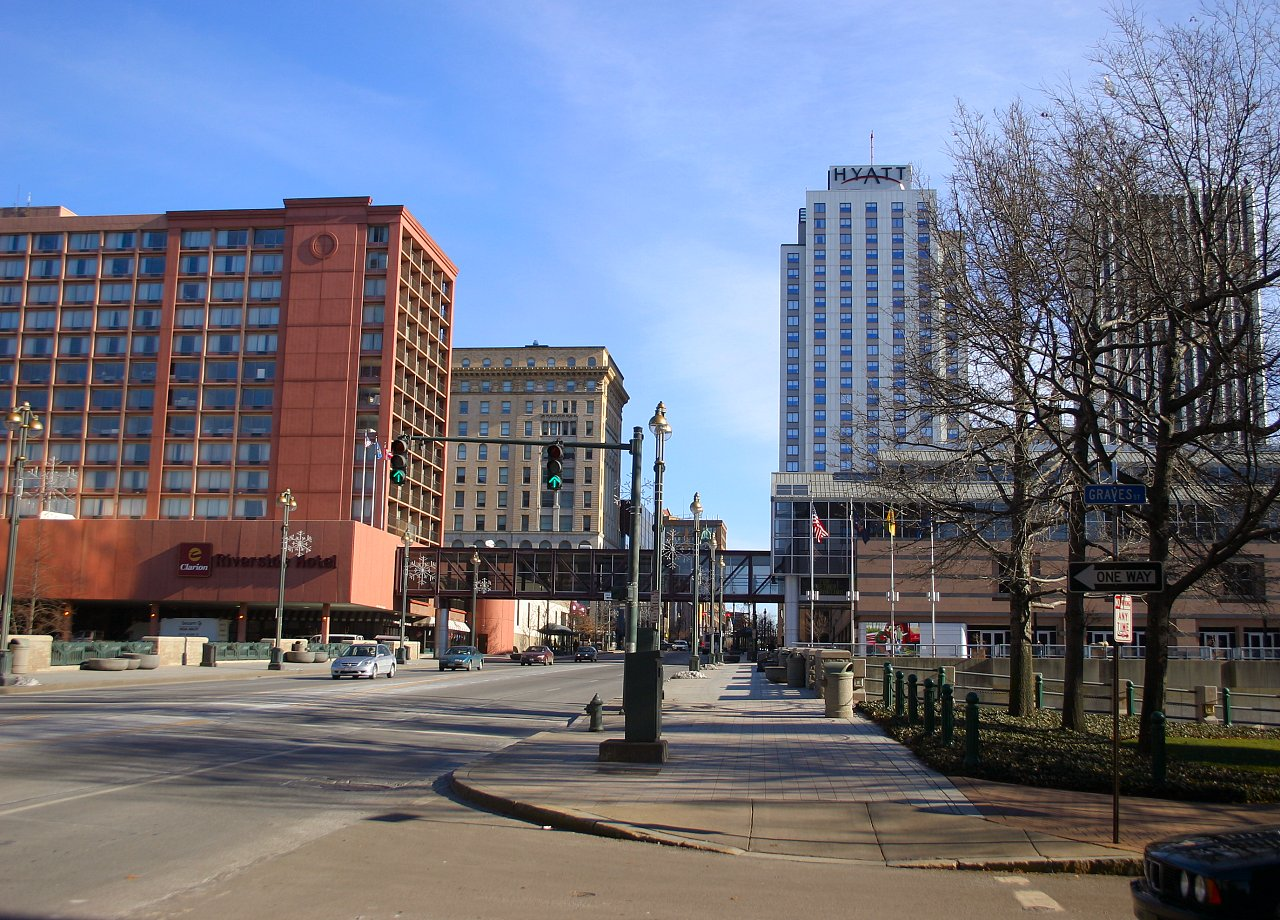
Main Street (former NY 35) at the Genesee River in Rochester in 2008

Once in Rochester, NY 35 diverged from its successor route. Instead of turning west onto Elmwood Avenue at then-NY 47, NY 35 veered north onto Genesee Street. It remained on Genesee until its end at Main Street (NY 33), then overlapped NY 33 eastward through downtown. At the time, NY 33 did not end at the junction of Broad and Main Streets as it does now.

NY 33 and NY 35 intersected NY 31, then routed on State Street, on the west bank of the Genesee River. After crossing the river, the two routes met US 15 at its northern terminus at Clinton Avenue. The overlap with NY 33 ended at East Avenue, which also carried NY 96. NY 35 continued eastward on Main Street, passing the Main Street Armory and East High School, and crossing over the then-New York Central Railroad main line before reaching Main Street's eastern terminus at Winton Road (NY 47).

NY 35 turned south at Winton, overlapping NY 47 for 0.7 miles (1.1 km) to an intersection with Blossom Road. Along the way, NY 35 and NY 47 intersected the western terminus of NY 35B. At Blossom, NY 35 turned east and followed the road out of the city and into Penfield. There, it passed through the southern portion of Ellison Park and crossed Irondequoit Creek before turning sharply to the northeast to meet the eastern terminus of NY 35B.

=== Penfield to Ontario ===
East of Blossom Road, NY 35's routing is identical to that of present-day NY 286 and NY 350. The lone exception is at the eastern terminus of NY 35, as NY 35 ended at Ridge Road (US 104) instead as the divided highway that now carries NY 104 north of Ridge Road had yet to be constructed.

== History ==
In 1908, the New York State Legislature created Route 16, an unsigned legislative route extending from the village of Cuba to the city of Rochester. Between the hamlet of Mumford and Scottsville, Route 16 encompassed Scottsville–Mumford Road. Also created in 1908 was Route 15, which initially began in Hornell and ended in Caledonia. Route 15 was extended northward to Route 16 in Scottsville on July 24, 1911. The extension utilized River Road from the hamlet of Canawaugus to the village of Scottsville and a small piece of Main Street within Scottsville itself. On March 1, 1921, Route 16 was truncated to end in Le Roy while the portion of its former routing north of Caledonia became part of a realigned and extended Route 15. No portion of pre-1921 Route 15 north of Canawaugus nor post-1921 Route 15 north of Mumford was assigned a designation when the first set of routes in the modern state highway system were assigned in 1924.

NY 35 was assigned in 1927 to replace the portion of NY 7 between downtown Buffalo and Canawaugus along Broadway, Telephone Road, and River Road (now mostly NY 130 and US 20). In the 1930 renumbering of state highways in New York, NY 35 was extended northeastward to the hamlet of Ontario Center by way of downtown Rochester. Between Canawaugus and Scottsville, NY 35 utilized the pre-1921 routing of legislative Route 15. At the same time, the segment of post-1921 Route 15 from Mumford to Scottsville and the Main Street portion of pre-1921 Route 15 were designated as part of NY 253. NY 35 was truncated and slightly rerouted c. 1938 after US 20 was moved onto its current alignment through Western New York. Instead of continuing south from Scottsville, NY 35 was altered to head west from the village to Mumford, replacing NY 253. The portion of River Road from Scottsville to Quaker Road in Wheatland remained part of NY 251, which had overlapped NY 35 along this stretch.

The NY 35 designation was split into two designations in the early 1940s. From Mumford to Ontario Center Road in Walworth, NY 35 was renumbered to NY 383. The remainder of the route in Walworth and Ontario became an extension of NY 350, which had previously ended at a junction with then-NY 33B north of Macedon. The NY 35 designation was then transferred to a highway in Westchester County.

The segment of River Road between NY 251 and the Monroe–Livingston county line, vacated by NY 35 c. 1938, remains state-maintained to this day as NY 940H, an unsigned reference route 1.17 miles (1.88 km) in length.

== Suffixed routes ==
NY 35 had two suffixed routes. Both have since been removed from the state highway system or redesignated.

- NY 35A was a spur route of NY 35 in Buffalo and Cheektowaga. When it was originally assigned as part of the 1930 renumbering of state highways in New York, it began at the junction of Broadway (NY 35) and Bailey Avenue in Buffalo and followed Bailey Avenue north to Walden Avenue, where it turned east and used Walden Avenue and Dale Road to return to NY 35 at a junction midway between the communities of Sloan and Forks. By 1935, NY 18 was rerouted through Buffalo to bypass downtown on Bailey Avenue, resulting in the truncation of NY 35A to the junction of Walden and Bailey Avenues. It was removed completely c. 1936.
- NY 35B was an alternate route of NY 35 assigned to Browncroft Boulevard in Rochester. It began at NY 35 and NY 47 in eastern Rochester and ended at NY 35 in Penfield. The route was assigned at some point between 1934 and 1938 and redesignated as NY 383B in the early 1940s to match the renumbering of NY 35. Most of the route east of the city limits is now part of NY 286.

== Major intersections ==
County	Location	mi	km	Destinations	Notes
Monroe	Wheatland	0.00	0.00	NY 36	Hamlet of Mumford
Monroe	Scottsville	5.71	9.19	NY 251 west	Now NY 386; western terminus of NY 35 / NY 251 overlap
Monroe	Scottsville	6.21	9.99	NY 251 east	Eastern terminus of NY 35 / NY 251 overlap
Monroe	Scottsville	6.33	10.19	NY 253	Western terminus of NY 253
Monroe	Chili	12.65	20.36	NY 252	Western terminus of NY 252
Monroe	Chili	13.84	22.27	NY 198	Later NY 252A, now the unsigned County Route 168; eastern terminus of NY 198
Monroe	Rochester	15.98	25.72	NY 47	
Monroe	Rochester	17.78	28.61	NY 33 west	Western terminus of NY 33 / NY 35 overlap
Monroe	Rochester	18.99	30.56	NY 31	
Monroe	Rochester	19.32	31.09	US 15	Northern terminus of US 15
Monroe	Rochester	19.42	31.25	NY 33 east / NY 96	Eastern terminus of NY 33 / NY 35 overlap; northern terminus of NY 96
Monroe	Rochester	22.34	35.95	NY 47 east	Northern terminus of NY 35 / NY 47 overlap
Monroe	Rochester	22.48	36.18	NY 35B	Western terminus of NY 35B
Monroe	Rochester	23.04	37.08	NY 47 west	Southern terminus of NY 35 / NY 47 overlap
Monroe	Penfield	25.70	41.36	NY 35B	Now NY 286; eastern terminus of NY 35B
Monroe	Penfield	29.70	47.80	NY 250	
Wayne	Ontario	41.38	66.59	US 104 (Ridge Road)	Hamlet of Ontario Center
1.000 mi = 1.609 km; 1.000 km = 0.621 mi: Concurrency terminus

== See also ==
- List of county routes in Livingston County, New York
