= New York State Route 251 =

State highway in western New York, US

New York State Route 251
- NY 251 highlighted in red

Route information
- Maintained by NYSDOT
- Length: 17.79 mi (28.63 km)
- Existed: 1930–present

Major junctions
- West end: NY 383 in Scottsville
- I-390 in Rush; NY 64 in Mendon
- East end: NY 96 in Victor

Location
- Country: United States
- State: New York
- Counties: Monroe, Ontario

Highway system
- New York Highways; Interstate; US; State; Reference; Parkways
← NY 250	→ NY 252

New York State Route 251 (NY 251) is an east–west state highway in western New York in the United States. It extends for 17.79 miles (28.63 km) from an intersection with NY 383 in Scottsville, Monroe County, to an intersection with NY 96 in the town of Victor, Ontario County. NY 251 connects to Interstate 390 (I-390) in Rush and serves the village of Honeoye Falls (via NY 65) and the hamlet of Mendon within the town of the same name. The route, a two-lane, rural highway for much of its length, also intersects NY 15 and NY 64, two north–south highways leading to the Southern Tier and the Finger Lakes, respectively. Two sections of the route—from south of Scottsville to Rush and from Mendon to western Victor—follow linear east–west alignments. All but 3 miles (5 km) of the route are located in Monroe County.

From 1911 to 1921, the north–south section of modern NY 251 near Scottsville was part of Route 15, an unsigned legislative route assigned by the New York State Legislature. The first portion of what is now NY 251 to receive a posted designation was the segment east of NY 64 in Mendon, which was part of the signed NY 15 from 1924 to 1930. In the 1930 renumbering of state highways in New York, NY 251 was assigned to an alignment extending from Gates to Victor via Scottsville, utilizing modern NY 386 north of Scottsville and its current alignment east of the village. NY 251 was truncated to begin at NY 383 in Scottsville on July 1, 1977, at which time the former routing of NY 251 between Scottsville and Gates became part of an extended NY 386.

== Route description ==
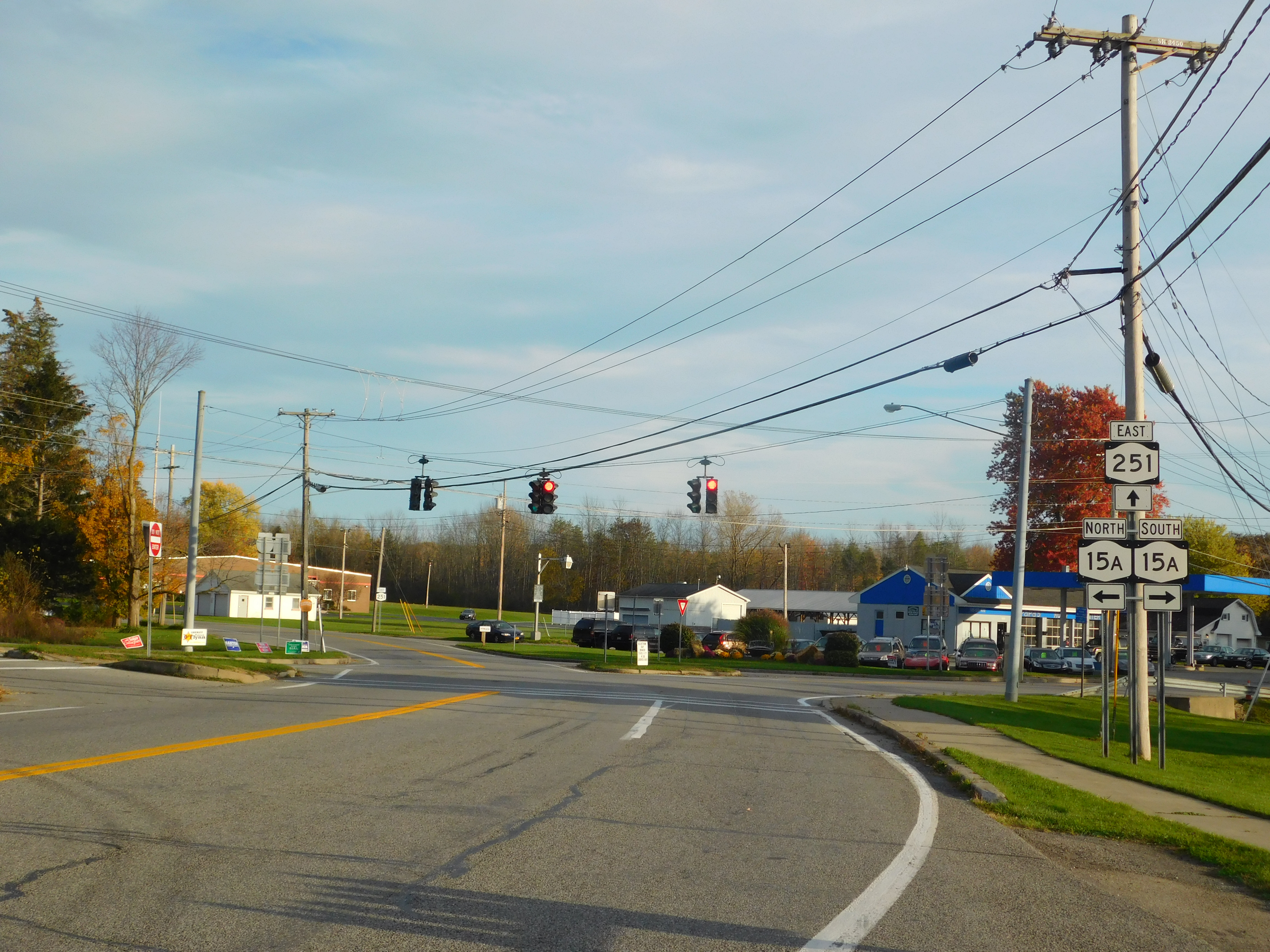
NY 251 running east at NY 15A of the town of Rush

NY 251 begins at an intersection with NY 383 in the center of the village of Scottsville, located within the town of Wheatland. It departs Scottsville to the south as River Road and crosses over Oatka Creek before meeting Quaker Road at a rural intersection just south of the village. While River Road continues southward as the unsigned NY 940H, NY 251 turns east to begin its east–west trek across the mostly undeveloped southern portion of Monroe County. After roughly 0.5 miles (0.8 km), it crosses over the Genesee River and into the town of Rush, becoming Rush–Scottsville Road in the process. Just inside the town line, NY 251 passes through the hamlet of Industry, a location centered around NY 251's grade crossing with the Livonia, Avon and Lakeville Railroad and the adjacent Rochester & Genesee Valley Railroad Museum.

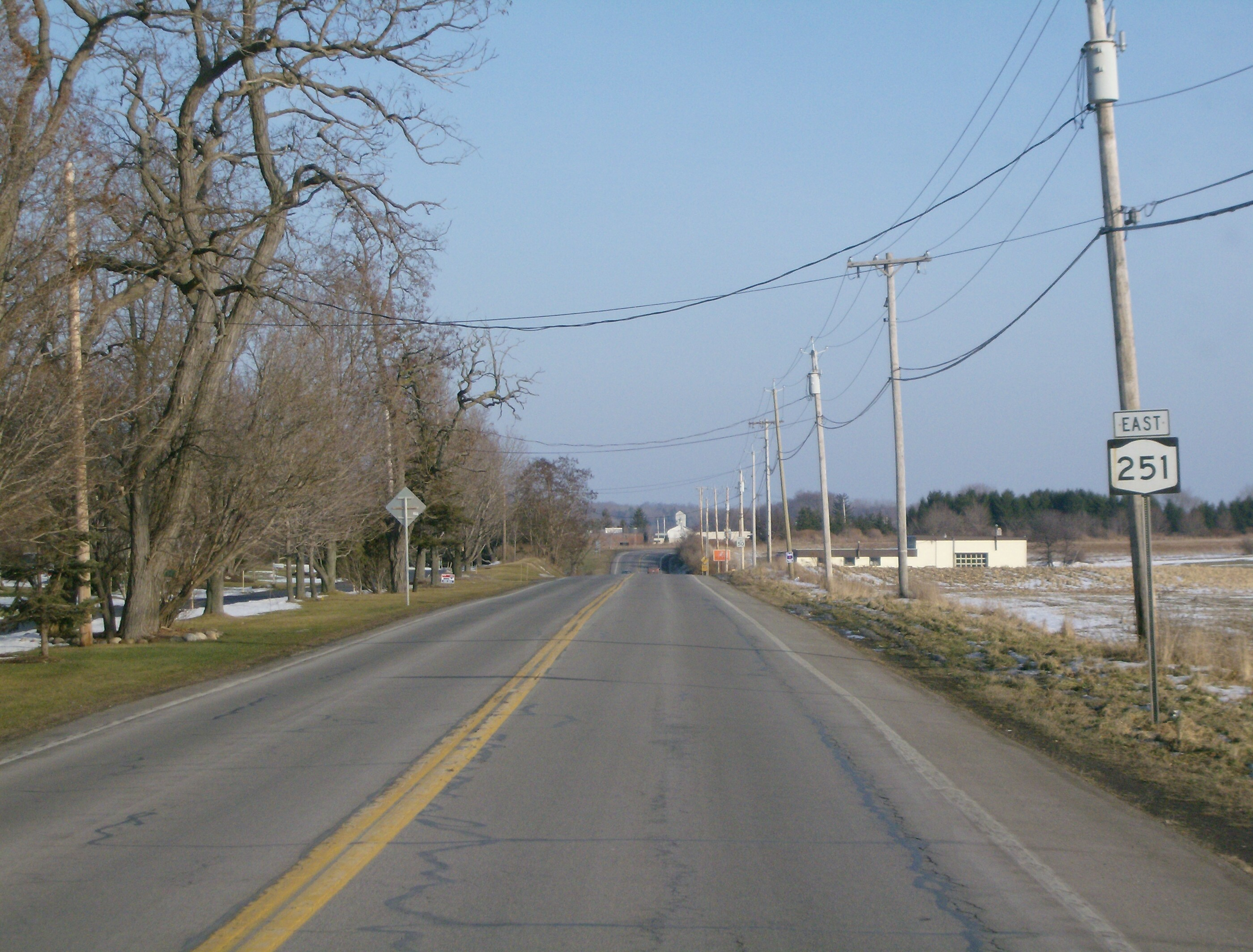
Just west of the Ontario County line on NY 251 eastbound in Mendon

Midway through the town of Rush, NY 251 widens from two to four lanes and meets I-390 at exit 11. Just east of the freeway, NY 251 intersects NY 15, which is also served by exit 11 by way of a pair of short collector/distributor roads paralleling I-390 from NY 251 to NY 15. Past NY 15, the route reverts to a two-lane highway and veers southeast to parallel Honeoye Creek into the hamlet of Rush. Here, the route passes through a more populated area as it intersects NY 15A in the center of the community, at which point it becomes Rush–Mendon Road. NY 251 continues to follow Honeoye Creek through progressively less developed areas and into the town of Mendon, where the creek curves southward toward Honeoye Falls at Rochester Junction. The highway, however, turns northeastward to meet NY 65 at a roundabout. The northeasterly routing of NY 251 continues to Mendon Center, a small hamlet near the southern tip of Mendon Ponds Park, where it turns eastward once more.

NY 251 continues across open fields to the densely populated hamlet of Mendon, where it has a junction with NY 64 in the center of the community. East of the junction, NY 251 becomes Victor–Mendon Road as it heads out of Mendon. About 0.5 miles (0.8 km) from NY 64, the open surroundings return as the route crosses into the Ontario County town of Victor. NY 251 continues on a virtual east–west line for its first 1.5 miles (2.4 km) in the county, heading through slightly more developed but still sparsely populated areas. At Phillips Road, the route curves southeastward for 1 mile (1.6 km) before making one final turn to the northeast. On this last stretch, NY 251 crosses the Ontario Central Railroad at a grade crossing and ends at a junction with NY 96 northwest of the village of Victor.

== History ==
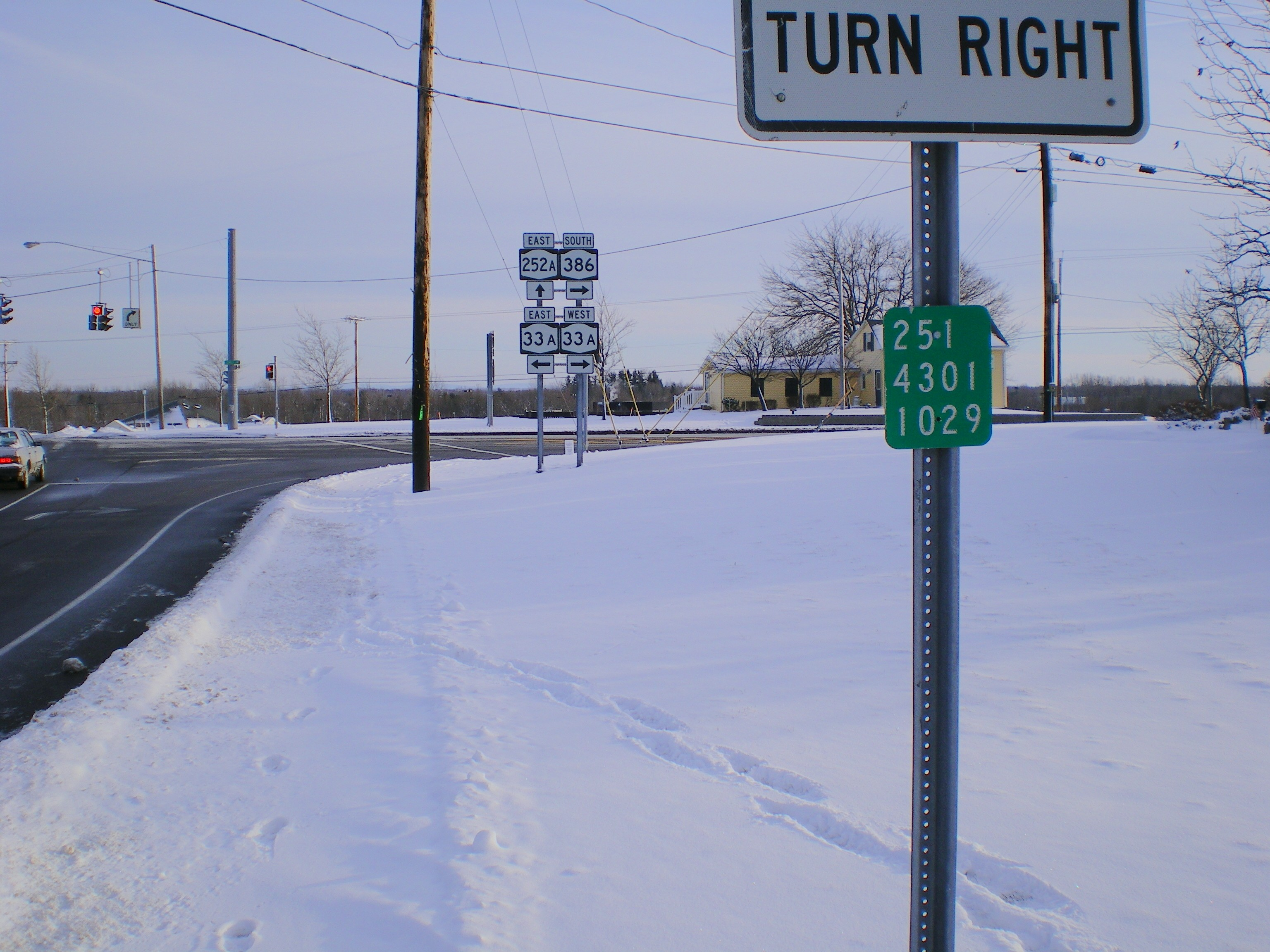
Reference marker for NY 251 on NY 386 in Chili

The westernmost portion of what is now NY 251 between NY 383 in Scottsville and the junction of River and Quaker Roads south of the village was once part of Route 15, an unsigned legislative route assigned by the New York State Legislature. Route 15 was extended northward from its original terminus in Caledonia to Scottsville via River Road on July 24, 1911; however, it was realigned on March 1, 1921, to enter Scottsville on modern NY 383 instead. When the first set of posted routes were assigned in New York in 1924, this piece of modern NY 251 did not receive a designation. Another section did, however, as the portion extending from Mendon east to Victor was designated as part of NY 15. In the 1930 renumbering of state highways in New York, NY 15 was rerouted between Victor and Pittsford to follow current NY 96. The former routing of NY 15 from Victor to Mendon became part of NY 251, a new highway extending from NY 15 in Victor to NY 33 in Gates via Chili and Scottsville. West of Scottsville, NY 251 was routed on modern NY 383 and NY 386.

From 1930 to c. 1938, the River Road section of NY 251 overlapped with NY 35, which initially entered Monroe County on the former routing of legislative Route 15 and continued north to Rochester on current NY 383. The southwestern end of NY 35 was moved to Mumford c. 1938, shifting the location of the overlap to Main Street in Scottsville. The concurrency was replaced with one with NY 383 when it supplanted most of NY 35 in the early 1940s. On July 1, 1977, NY 251 was truncated to begin at the eastern end of its overlap with NY 383 in Scottsville. The former routing of NY 251 from the west end of the concurrency in Scottsville to Gates became an extension of NY 386, which was a simple connector in northern Gates and southern Greece prior to the change.

== Major intersections ==
County	Location	mi	km	Destinations	Notes
Monroe	Scottsville	0.00	0.00	NY 383 (Main Street) to NY 386 – Rochester, Mumford	Western terminus
Monroe	Wheatland	1.00	1.61	River Road ( NY 940H)	Northern terminus of unsigned NY 940H; formerly part of NY 35
Monroe	Rush	4.91	7.90	I-390 (Genesee Expressway) to I-90 – Rochester, Avon	Exit 11 (I-390)
Monroe	Rush	5.04	8.11	NY 15 (West Henrietta Road) to I-390 north	To I-390 north only signed westbound
Monroe	Rush	6.33	10.19	NY 15A (East Henrietta Road)	
Monroe	Mendon	10.03	16.14	NY 65 (Clover Street)	Roundabout
Monroe	Mendon	13.90	22.37	NY 64 (Mendon Road)	Hamlet of Mendon
Ontario	Town of Victor	17.79	28.63	NY 96 (Pittsford Victor Road) to New York Thruway	Eastern terminus
1.000 mi = 1.609 km; 1.000 km = 0.621 mi
