= New York State Route 35 (disambiguation) =

New York State Route 35 is an east–west state highway in Westchester County, New York, United States, that was established in the early 1940s.

New York State Route 35 may also refer to:

- New York State Route 35 (mid-1920s–1927) in Erie, Wyoming, and Livingston Counties
- New York State Route 35 (1927 – early 1940s) in Monroe and Wayne Counties
