= New York State Route 33A =

State highway in Monroe County, New York, US

New York State Route 33A
- Map of Rochester with NY 33A highlighted in red

Route information
- Auxiliary route of NY 33
- Maintained by NYSDOT and the city of Rochester
- Length: 17.15 mi (27.60 km)
- Existed: 1930–present

Major junctions
- West end: NY 33 in Bergen
- I-390 in Gates
- East end: NY 33 in Rochester

Location
- Country: United States
- State: New York
- Counties: Genesee, Monroe

Highway system
- New York Highways; Interstate; US; State; Reference; Parkways
| ← NY 33 | → NY 34 |

New York State Route 33A (NY 33A) is an east–west state highway mostly located in Monroe County, New York, in the United States. The route is just over 17 miles (27 km) long and serves as an alternate route of NY 33 between the town of Bergen in Genesee County and the city of Rochester in Monroe County. While NY 33 heads to Rochester by way of Churchville and northern Gates, NY 33A dips south to pass through Chili and southern Gates. NY 33A was assigned as part of the 1930 renumbering of state highways in New York, but only from Riga to Rochester. It was extended westward to its current terminus in Bergen c. 1932.

== Route description ==
=== West of Gates ===
NY 33A begins at an intersection with NY 33 just east of the village of Bergen in the town of the same name. From this point, NY 33 travels to the west and to the northeast while NY 33A heads east. Less than a quarter of a mile (0.4 km) from its western terminus, NY 33A meets Interstate 490 (I-490) at exit 2. In this area, I-490 straddles the border between Genesee County and Monroe County; thus, the westbound portion of the interchange is in Genesee County while the eastbound half is in Monroe County.

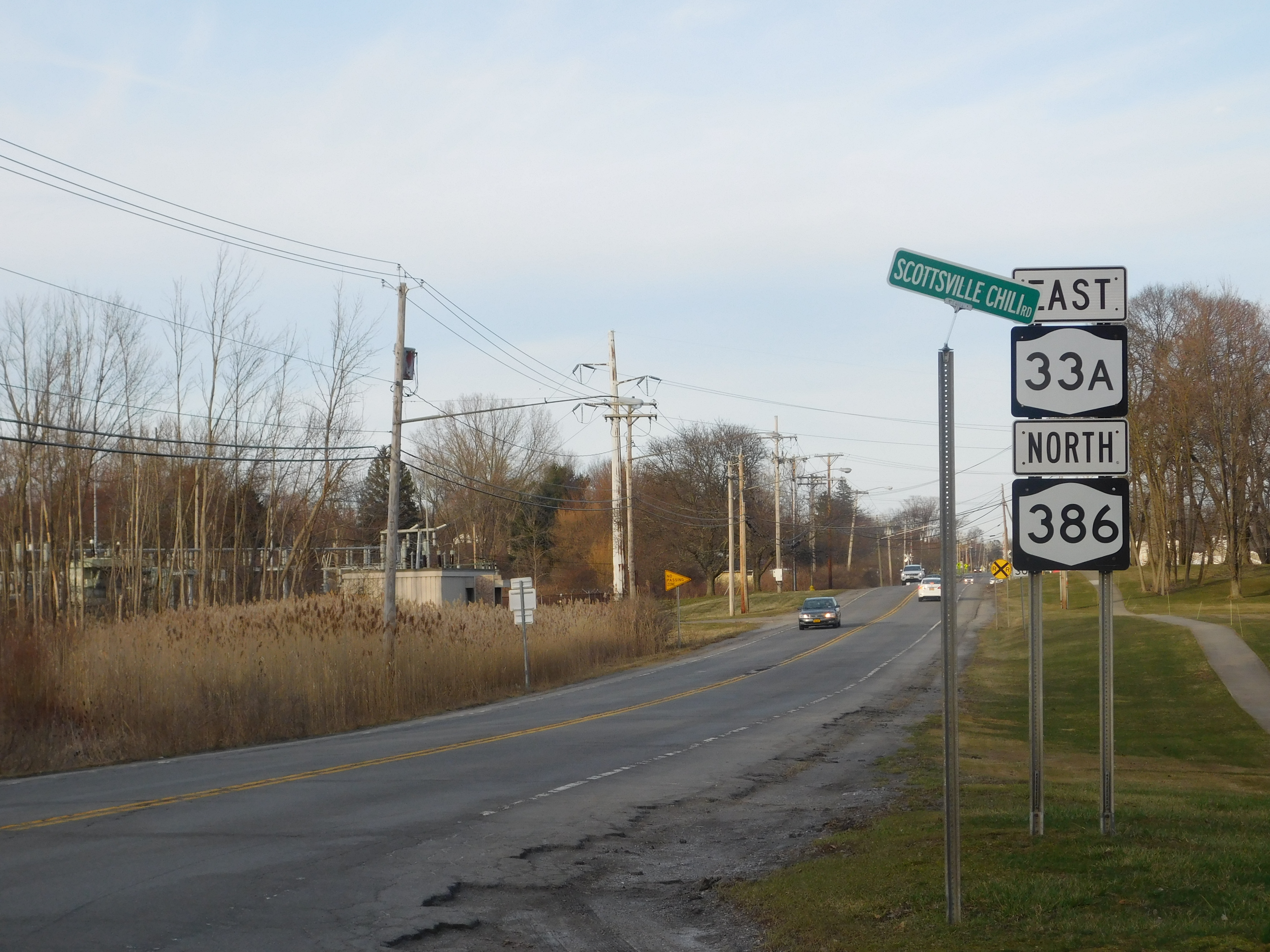
The beginning of the concurrency between NY 33A and NY 386 in Chili

Now in the town of Riga, NY 33A becomes Chili–Riga Center Road as it traverses a largely rural portion of southwestern Monroe County. In the small hamlet of Riga, the route intersects and briefly overlaps with NY 36. East of Riga hamlet, NY 33A heads generally northeastward, passing by Black Creek Park as it enters the town of Chili. Just west of the hamlet of West Chili, the route crosses over Black Creek and intersects Chili Avenue Extension. At this junction, NY 33A becomes Chili Avenue, the name it retains into the city of Rochester. Locally, the Chili Avenue name is used more in common parlance than the NY 33A designation.

In West Chili, the route meets the southern terminus of NY 259. The route continues on, heading northeastward into more densely populated areas of the town of Chili. About 1.5 miles (2.4 km) east of West Chili, NY 33A intersects the western terminus of NY 252. Not far to the northeast, the highway meets NY 386, which joins NY 33A for one mile (1.6 km) to Chili Center, Chili's main commercial hub. Here, NY 386 splits off to the north at a junction that also served as the western terminus of NY 252A. Past Chili Center, NY 33A heads northeast through a residential neighborhood and into the town of Gates.

=== Gates and Rochester ===
Just across the town line, NY 33A intersects the east end of the Airport Expressway (NY 204). At this point, NY 204 leaves the highway and turns to follow NY 33A eastward. While most of NY 33A west of Gates is a two-lane highway, the portion of Chili Avenue that carries both NY 33A and NY 204 is a four-lane roadway. The two routes soon enter Tressmar, a hamlet that has been transformed into a major commercial destination. The development is mostly centered on Westgate Plaza, a large shopping plaza anchored by a Walmart. As NY 33A passes south of the plaza, it connects to Howard Road (unsigned NY 940L and formerly part of NY 47) and Brooks Avenue. NY 204 leaves NY 33A at Brooks Avenue to follow the road eastward toward the Greater Rochester International Airport.

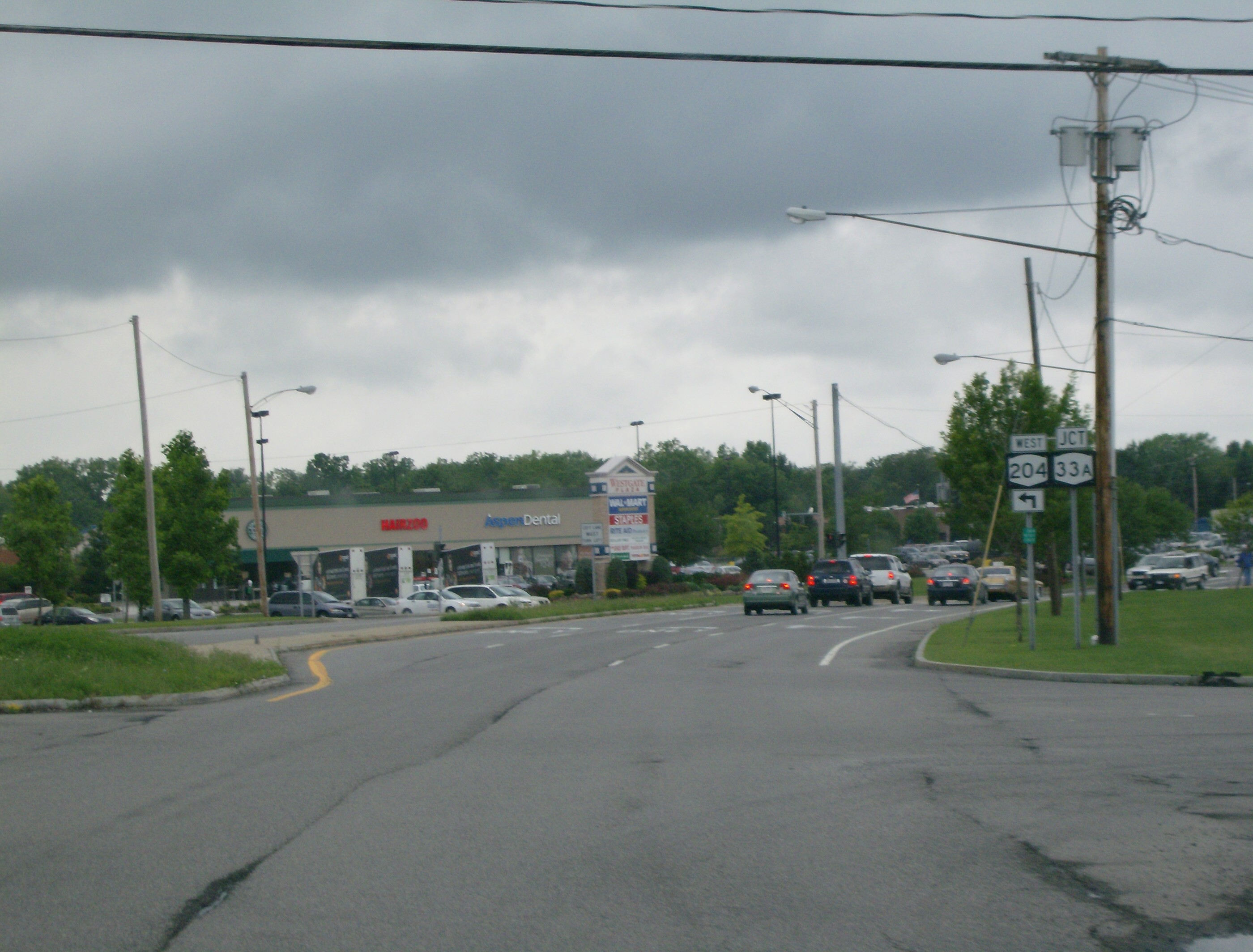
Approaching NY 33A on NY 204 westbound

East of Brooks Avenue, NY 33A passes through a small residential area before entering a more industrial neighborhood surrounding the Erie Canal and the Rochester city line. In the western portion of this area, the route meets I-390 at exit 19 and intersects Buell Road (County Route 162), which directly links NY 33A to the airport a half-mile (0.8 km) to the south. East of I-390, NY 33A crosses the Erie Canal and enters the city of Rochester, at which point maintenance of NY 33A shifts from the New York State Department of Transportation (NYSDOT) to the city of Rochester. On the northern bank of the waterway, the route passes under the Rochester and Southern Railroad. The surroundings become significantly more residential east of the railroad as the route heads northeastward toward downtown Rochester. However, NY 33A ends roughly one mile (1.6 km) west of downtown at a junction with NY 33 (West Avenue). Here, Chili and West Avenues converge and NY 33 continues toward downtown as West Main Street.

== History ==
In 1908, the New York State Legislature created Route 16, an unsigned legislative route extending from the Southern Tier village of Cuba to the city of Rochester just south of Lake Ontario. Route 16 entered the Rochester area on what is now NY 386 and followed modern NY 386, Old Scottsville–Chili Road, and Chili Avenue northeastward to the Rochester city line. From there, the route continued for an additional 1 mile (1.6 km) to the original city limits, where it ended near the intersection of Chili Avenue and Post Street. On March 1, 1921, Route 16 was truncated to end in Le Roy while the portion of its former alignment north of Caledonia became part of an extended Route 15.

When the first set of posted routes in New York were assigned in 1924, the segment of legislative Route 15 north of Caledonia was not assigned a designation. Within two years, a highway extending from Batavia to Rochester by way of Bergen and Gates was designated as NY 33. However, NY 33 followed a more northerly routing through Gates than old Route 15 did as it used Buffalo Road instead of Chili Avenue. In the 1930 renumbering of state highways in New York, the Chili Avenue portion of legislative Route 15 became part of the new NY 33A, a then-spur route of NY 33 that began at NY 36 in Riga and ended at NY 33 in southwestern Rochester. NY 33A was extended westward c. 1932 to the town of Bergen, where it reconnected to NY 33 southeast of the village of Bergen.

== Major intersections ==
| County | Location | mi | km | Destinations | Notes |
|---|---|---|---|---|---|
| Genesee | Village of Bergen | 0.00 | 0.00 | NY 33 | Western terminus |
| Genesee | Bergen–Riga town line | 0.28 | 0.45 | I-490 to I-90 (New York Thruway) – Rochester, LeRoy | Exit 2 on I-490 |
| Monroe | Riga | 2.93 | 4.72 | NY 36 north to I-490 – Churchville | West end of NY 36 overlap |
| Monroe | Riga | 3.16 | 5.09 | NY 36 south – Mumford, Caledonia | East end of NY 36 overlap |
| Monroe | Chili | 7.91 | 12.73 | NY 259 north to I-490 | Southern terminus of NY 259; hamlet of West Chili |
| Monroe | Chili | 9.57 | 15.40 | NY 252 east | Western terminus of NY 252 |
| Monroe | Chili | 9.88 | 15.90 | NY 386 south | West end of NY 386 overlap |
| Monroe | Chili | 10.89 | 17.53 | NY 386 north to I-490 | East end of NY 386 overlap; hamlet of Chili Center |
| Monroe | Gates | 13.46 | 21.66 | NY 204 west to I-490 | West end of NY 204 overlap |
| Monroe | Gates | | | Howard Road (NY 940L north) | |
| Monroe | Gates | 14.31 | 23.03 | NY 204 east | East end of NY 204 overlap |
| Monroe | Gates | 15.41 | 24.80 | I-390 to I-490 | Exit 19 on I-390 |
| Monroe | Rochester | 17.15 | 27.60 | NY 33 | Eastern terminus |
1.000 mi = 1.609 km; 1.000 km = 0.621 mi: Concurrency terminus
