= New York State Route 386 =

State highway in Monroe County, New York, US

New York State Route 386
- Map of the Rochester area with NY 386 highlighted in red

Route information
- Maintained by NYSDOT and Monroe County
- Length: 15.46 mi (24.88 km)
- Existed: c. 1931–present

Major junctions
- South end: NY 383 in Scottsville
- I-490 in Chili; NY 531 in Gates
- North end: NY 104 in Greece

Location
- Country: United States
- State: New York
- Counties: Monroe

Highway system
- New York Highways; Interstate; US; State; Reference; Parkways
← NY 385	→ NY 387

New York State Route 386 (NY 386) is a north–south state highway located in the western suburbs of the city of Rochester in Monroe County, New York, in the United States. Its southern terminus is at an intersection with NY 383 in the village of Scottsville. The northern end of the highway is located at a junction with NY 104 in the town of Greece. NY 386 meets Interstate 490 (I-490) in Chili and NY 531 in Gates and has short overlaps with NY 33A in Chili and NY 33 in Gates. The portion of the route south of NY 33A passes through mostly rural areas while the section north of NY 33A serves areas of mostly residential nature.

The portion of NY 386 between Scottsville and Chili was originally designated as part of Route 16, an unsigned legislative route, in 1908. This section of Route 16 became part of Route 15 in 1921. In the 1930 renumbering of state highways in New York, this segment of Route 15 was incorporated into NY 251, a new route established as part of the renumbering. NY 386 was assigned by the following year to the portion of its modern routing north of NY 31. It was extended south to Scottsville over former NY 251 on July 1, 1977. In 2007, ownership and maintenance of most of NY 386 between NY 33A and NY 104 was transferred from the New York State Department of Transportation (NYSDOT) to Monroe County as part of a highway maintenance swap between the two levels of government.

== Route description ==
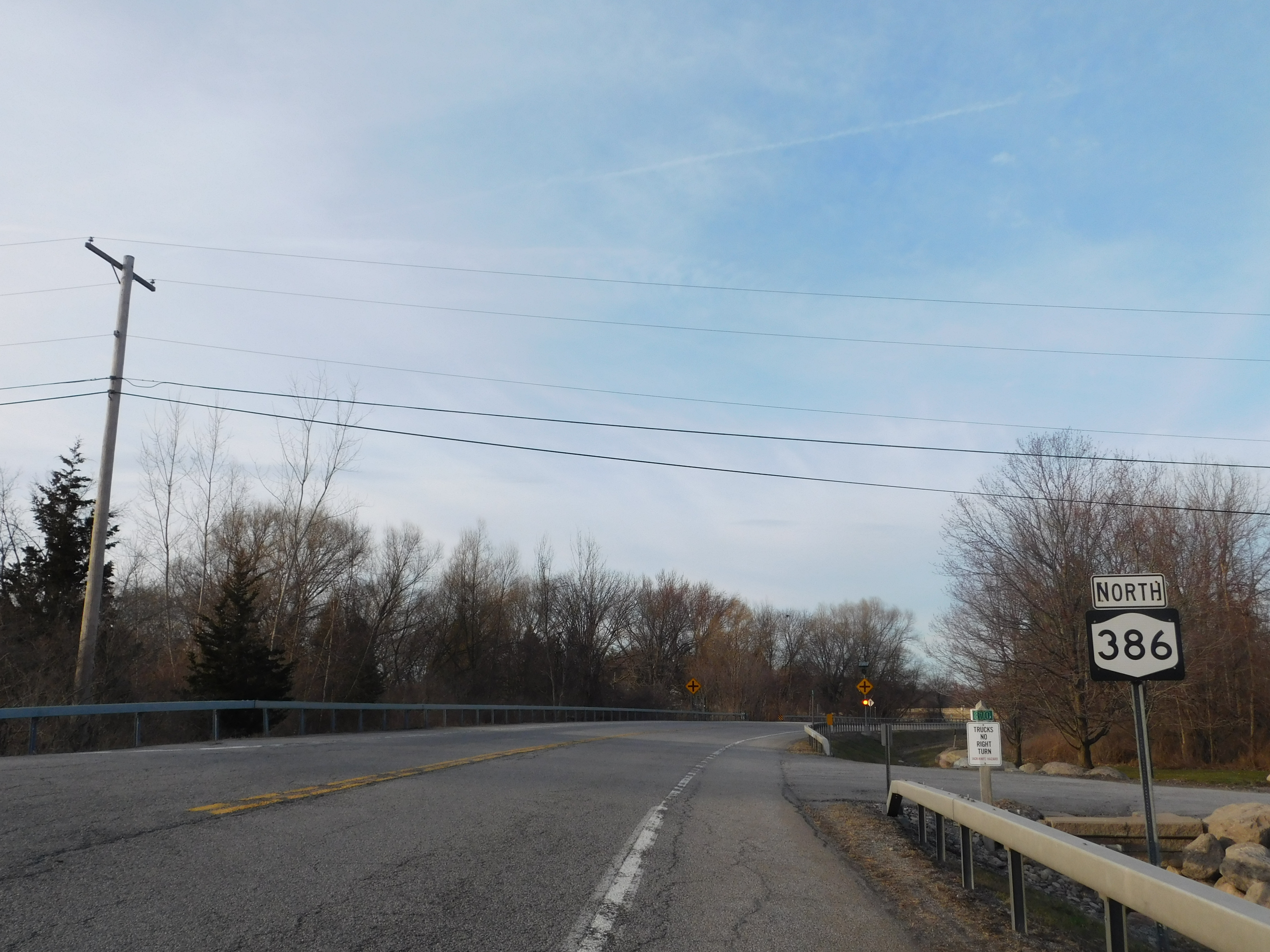
NY 386 northbound in Wheatland

NY 386 begins at a three-way intersection with NY 383 on the west side of the village of Scottsville. From this junction, NY 383 heads south and east while NY 386 takes the west exit, passing under the Rochester and Southern Railroad and turning to the northwest as it encircles the village. At North Road, which acts as a westward extension of NY 253, NY 386 passes the middle and high schools of the Wheatland–Chili Central School District and becomes Scottsville–Chili Road. The route continues onward, leaving Scottsville and entering an open, rural area of the town of Wheatland. NY 386 remains on a northwesterly track to the Chili town line, where it curves to the north as it approaches and crosses over the New York State Thruway (I-90).

The highway continues generally northward through Chili, traversing open fields and crossing over Black Creek ahead of an intersection with NY 252. Roughly 0.4 miles (0.6 km) to the northwest, NY 386 intersects NY 33A. NY 386 turns east here, overlapping NY 33A for 1 mile (1.6 km) east to the hamlet of Chili Center. The amount of development along the overlap remains low until the highway crosses the CSX Transportation-owned West Shore Subdivision, at which point the fields that had surrounded the route are replaced with homes and businesses. In Chili Center, the commercial center of the town of Chili, the concurrency ends at an intersection that also includes the former western terminus of NY 252A. NY 386 takes the north path out of the junction, becoming Chili Center–Coldwater Road. At this point, ownership and maintenance of NY 386 shifts from NYSDOT to Monroe County.

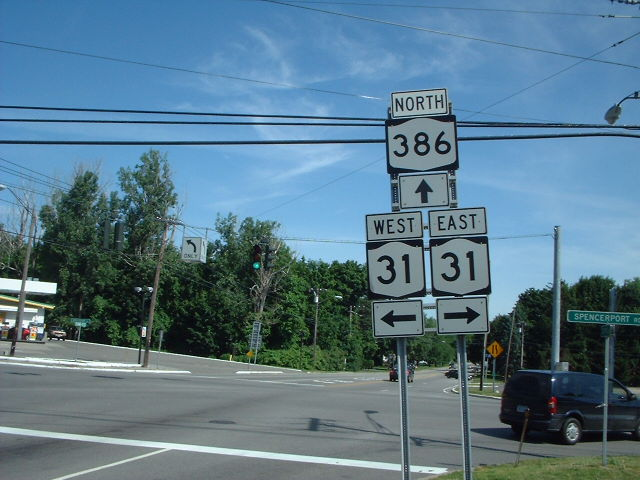
NY 386 at NY 31 in Gates. This junction was the original southern terminus of NY 386.

About 1 mile (1.6 km) north of Chili Center, NY 386 connects to I-490 at exit 5. North of the exit, Chili Center–Coldwater Road comes to an end at West Side Drive, forcing NY 386 to turn east onto West Side Drive for 0.5 miles (0.8 km) before returning north and entering the town of Gates on Coldwater Road. While on Coldwater Road, NY 386 crosses the CSX Transportation-owned Rochester Subdivision as it heads northward to a junction with NY 33. NY 386 turns east, sharing Buffalo Road with NY 33 for one block to Elmgrove Road, where it turns northward once again.

Proceeding north on Elmgrove Road, NY 386 passes the sprawling Rochester Tech Park and the Total Sports Experience prior to intersecting NY 531 by way of an interchange. This exit, the final on NY 531 eastbound before it merges with I-490, is also the starting point for the two service roads that parallel the expressway between Elmgrove and Manitou Roads. Past NY 531, NY 386 enters the hamlet of Elmgrove, centered around the junction between NY 31 and NY 386. The route continues onward, passing through mostly residential areas as it proceeds into the town of Greece. In Greece, the surroundings remain unchanged as NY 386 heads northward to an area of town known as South Greece, where it crosses over the Erie Canal. The route ends 1.5 miles (2.4 km) later at a junction with NY 104 near Elm Ridge Plaza.

== History ==
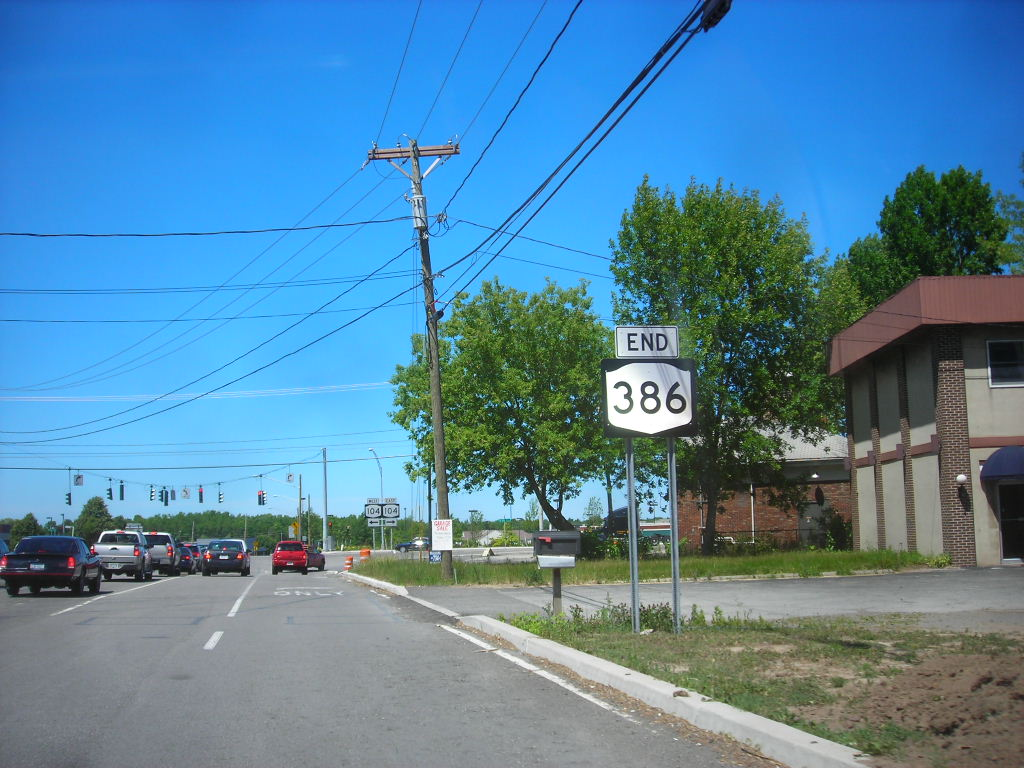
Northern terminus of NY 386 at NY 104 in Greece

The portion of NY 386 between Scottsville and NY 33A in Chili was originally designated as part of Route 16, an unsigned legislative route extending from Cuba to Rochester, in 1908. On March 1, 1921, Route 16 was truncated to end at Route 6 (modern NY 5) in Le Roy as part of a partial renumbering of New York's legislative route system. The portion of former Route 16 north of Caledonia became part of Route 15. The section of Route 15 between Scottsville and Chili became part of NY 251, a new route stretching from NY 33 in Gates to then-NY 15 in Victor, in the 1930 renumbering of state highways in New York. NY 386, meanwhile, was assigned by the following year to the portion of Elmgrove Road between NY 31 in Gates and U.S. Route 104 (now NY 104) in Greece.

NY 251 was truncated to its present terminus in Scottsville on July 1, 1977, at which time NY 386 was extended south along the former routing of NY 251 to Scottsville. Reference markers for NY 251 are still posted along its former routing. NY 386 utilized a previously unnumbered portion of Elmgrove Road between NY 31 and NY 33 to reach NY 251's former alignment. This part of NY 386 is maintained by Monroe County as the unsigned County Route 158 (CR 158).

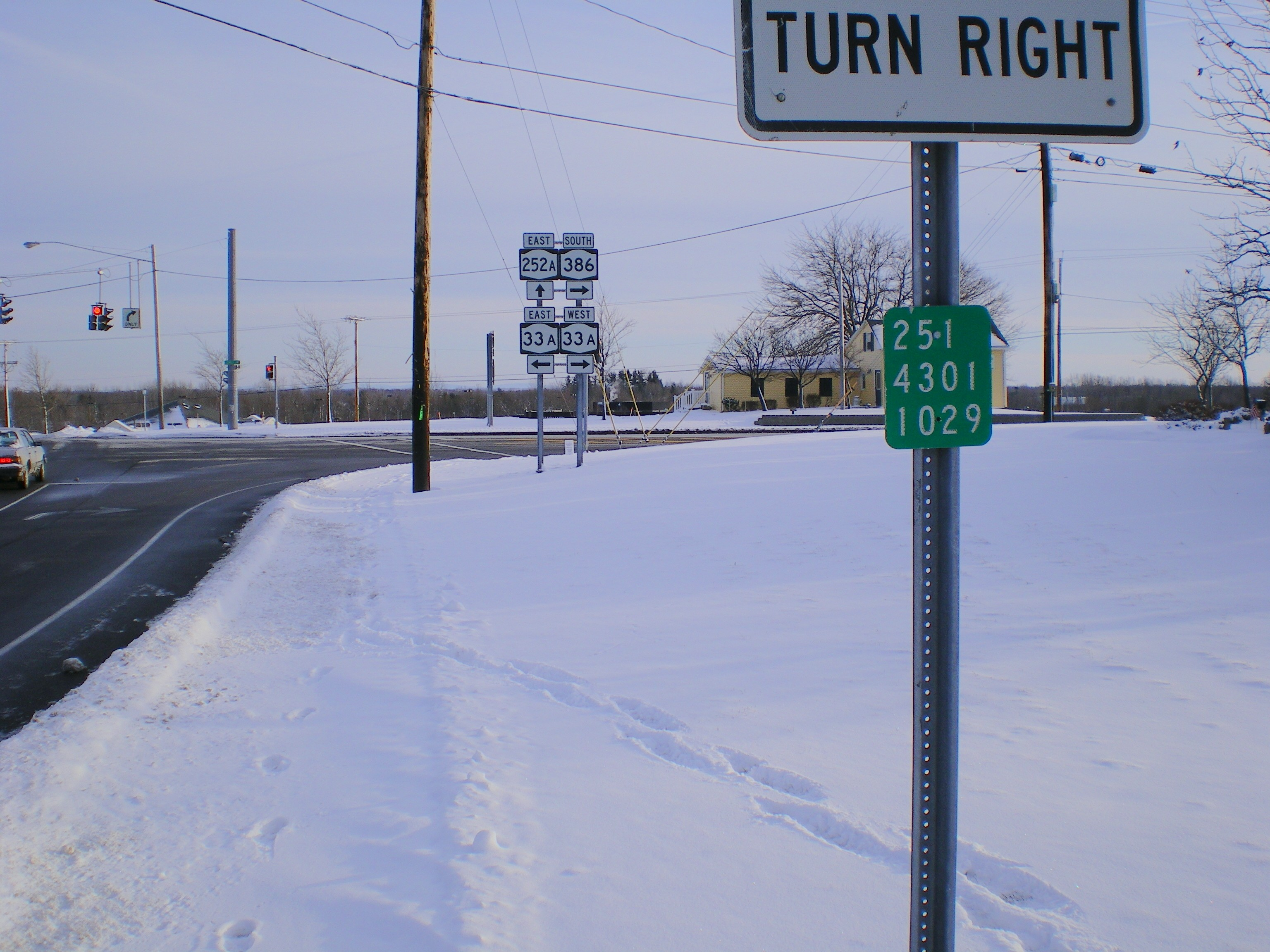
Reference marker for NY 251 on NY 386 southbound in Chili. This section of NY 386 is no longer state-maintained.

In 2007, ownership and maintenance of the remainder of the Elmgrove Road portion of NY 386 and the section of NY 386 between NY 33 and NY 33A were transferred from the state of New York to Monroe County as part of a highway maintenance swap between the two levels of government. A bill (S4856, 2007) to enact the swap was introduced in the New York State Senate on April 23 and passed by both the Senate and the New York State Assembly on June 20. The act was signed into law by Governor Eliot Spitzer on August 28. Under the terms of the act, it took effect 90 days after it was signed into law; thus, the maintenance swap officially took place on November 26, 2007.

As a result of the swap, all of NY 386 north of NY 33A—except for the section that overlaps NY 33—is overlapped by unsigned county routes. The portion of NY 386 on Chili Center–Coldwater Road is co-designated as CR 256. Along Westside Drive, NY 386 is part of CR 119, the designation for all of Westside Drive. The Coldwater Road segment, meanwhile, is also CR 198 while CR 158 was extended north to cover all of Elmgrove Road.

== Major intersections ==
The entire route is in Monroe County.

Location	mi	km	Destinations	Notes
Scottsville	0.00	0.00	NY 383	Southern terminus
Chili	6.09	9.80	NY 252	
Chili	6.42	10.33	NY 33A west	South end of NY 33A overlap
Chili	7.43	11.96	NY 33A east	North end of NY 33A overlap; former NY 252A; hamlet of Chili Center
Chili	8.36	13.45	I-490	Exit 5 on I-490
Gates	10.36	16.67	NY 33 west	South end of NY 33 overlap
Gates	10.56	16.99	NY 33 east	North end of NY 33 overlap
Gates	11.57	18.62	NY 531	Interchange
Gates	12.69	20.42	NY 31	
Town of Greece	15.46	24.88	NY 104	Northern terminus
1.000 mi = 1.609 km; 1.000 km = 0.621 mi

== See also ==
- List of county routes in Monroe County, New York
