= New York State Route 383 =

State highway in Monroe County, New York, US

New York State Route 383
- Map of Monroe County in western New York with NY 383 highlighted in red

Route information
- Maintained by NYSDOT and the city of Rochester
- Length: 18.70 mi (30.09 km)
- Existed: early 1940s–present

Major junctions
- South end: NY 36 in Wheatland
- NY 253 in Scottsville; I-390 in Chili
- North end: NY 31 in Rochester

Location
- Country: United States
- State: New York
- Counties: Monroe

Highway system
- New York Highways; Interstate; US; State; Reference; Parkways
← NY 382	→ NY 383B

New York State Route 383 (NY 383) is an 18.70-mile (30.09 km) north–south state highway in Monroe County, New York, in the United States. The southern terminus of the route is at an intersection with NY 36 in the hamlet of Mumford within the Town of Wheatland. Its northern terminus is at a junction with NY 31 in the city of Rochester. The route follows the Genesee River and its tributaries for its entire length and passes through the village of Scottsville.

In the early 20th century, the entirety of modern NY 383 south of Scottsville was part of Route 16, an unsigned legislative route. In 1921, Route 16 was truncated to end in Caledonia while the entirety of its former routing north of the village became part of Route 15. The segment of Route 15 between Mumford and Scottsville became part of NY 253 in the 1930 renumbering of state highways in New York. This section of NY 253 was replaced c. 1938 by a rerouted NY 35, a route that extended northeast of Scottsville to Ontario by way of Rochester. NY 35 was split into two routes in the early 1940s, at which time NY 383 was assigned to the portion between Mumford and Walworth. NY 383 was truncated to Rochester in 1949, and only minor realignments within the city have occurred since.

== Route description ==
NY 383 begins at an intersection with NY 36 in the hamlet of Mumford, located just north of the border between Monroe and Livingston Counties in the town of Wheatland. Taking on the name Scottsville–Mumford Road, NY 383 follows Oatka Creek east through open fields and passes through the small hamlet of Garbutt on its way to the village of Scottsville, where it becomes Caledonia Avenue. At an intersection with the southern terminus of NY 386, NY 383 turns east onto Main Street and follows it through the residential southern portion of the village and past the Scottsville Free Library. Main Street comes to an end at a junction with River Road (NY 251, which has its western terminus here) and Rochester Street near the northern bank of Oatka Creek. Here, NY 383 curves north onto Rochester Street and proceeds through eastern Scottsville. The street name of NY 383 becomes Scottsville Road upon intersecting the western terminus of NY 253. Past this junction, the surroundings shift from village streets to housing tracts as the route exits Scottsville. North of the village, NY 383 re-enters open fields once again upon crossing the Wheatland–Chili town line.

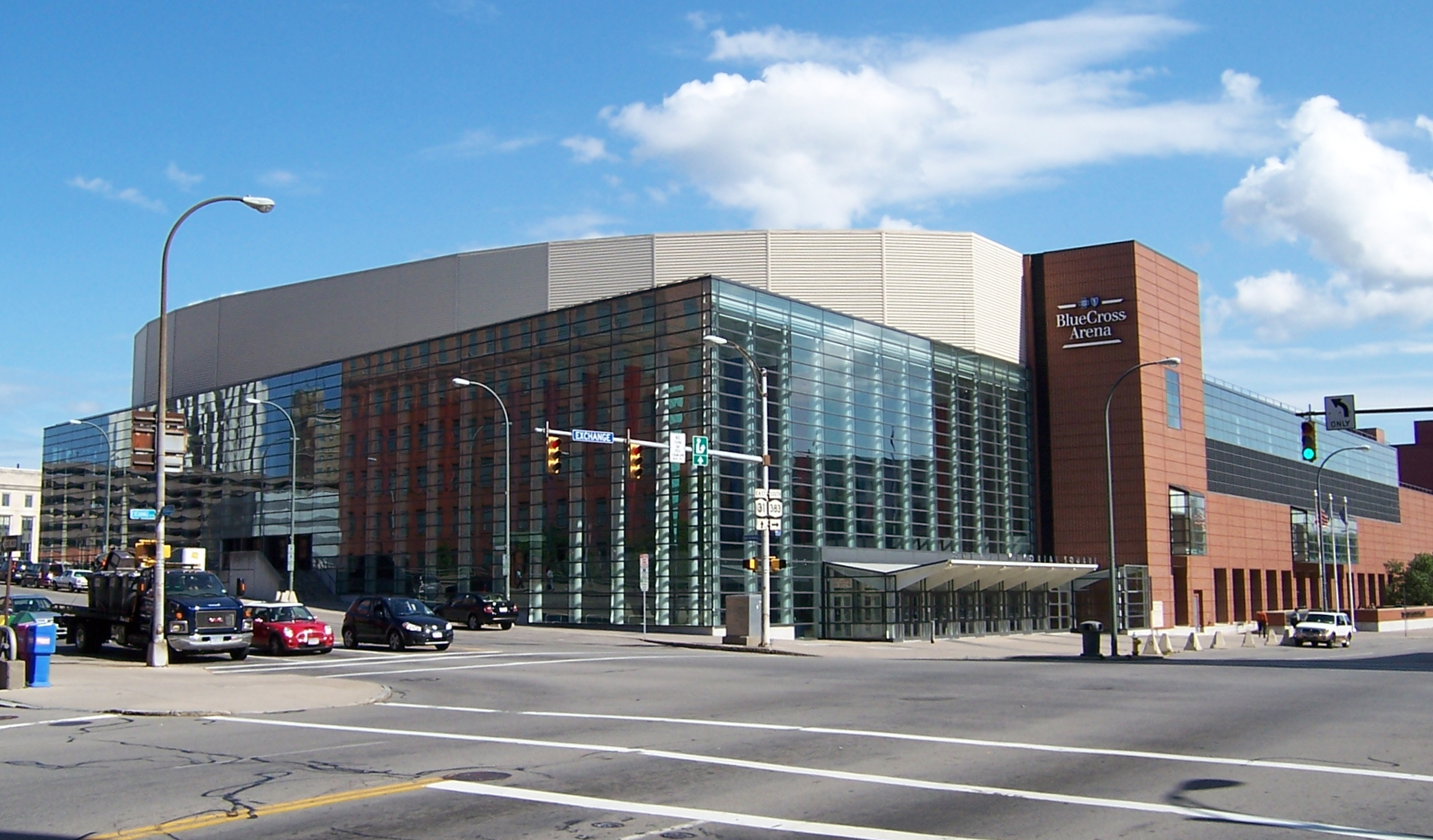
The northern terminus of NY 383 at NY 31 in Rochester, shown here, is located adjacent to the Blue Cross Arena

Within Chili, NY 383 parallels the path of the Genesee River, which Oatka Creek feeds into east of the village of Scottsville. During this stretch, the route passes under the New York State Thruway (Interstate 90 or I-90) and intersects Mile Wood Road, a highway connecting NY 383 to Mile of Woods, a hamlet on the west bank of the Genesee River. From this point, NY 383 heads to the north while the river flows to the northwest toward the route. Upon meeting the waterway, NY 383 begins to run along the Genesee River's western bank to a junction with NY 252. It continues along the riverbank as it proceeds northward, passing over Black Creek and crossing the West Shore Subdivision, a rail line owned by CSX Transportation. As NY 383 approaches the Greater Rochester International Airport, it diverges from the river and has a junction with Paul Road (unsigned County Route 168 and formerly NY 252A) south of the Airport. NY 383 follows the southern edge of the airport to an interchange with I-390 at exit 17. Shortly afterward, NY 383 crosses the Erie Canal and enters the city of Rochester. At this point, maintenance of NY 383 shifts from the New York State Department of Transportation to the city of Rochester.

Scottsville Road continues within the city for four blocks to a three-way junction with Genesee Street and Elmwood Avenue. NY 383 veers north onto Genesee Street for six blocks to Brooks Avenue. Here, the route turns east to access South Plymouth Avenue. NY 383 continues north on Plymouth Avenue through densely populated sections of the city to Ford Street. The route curves east to follow Ford for one block to Exchange Boulevard, where it turns back to the north toward downtown Rochester. NY 383 follows Exchange Boulevard along the Genesee River's west bank and under the Frederick Douglass–Susan B. Anthony Memorial Bridge, which carries I-490 over both NY 383 and the river. Past the bridge, the highway enters downtown, where it passes the City of Rochester Public Safety Building and the Blue Cross Arena before terminating at a junction with East Broad Street (NY 31).

== History ==
In 1908, the New York State Legislature created Route 16, an unsigned legislative route extending from the village of Cuba to the city of Rochester. Between the hamlet of Mumford and the village of Scottsville, Route 16 followed Scottsville–Mumford Road. By 1919, Route 15 was extended northeast from Caledonia to meet Route 16 in Scottsville. Within the village, it was routed on River Road and Main Street. On March 1, 1921, Route 16 was truncated to end in Le Roy while the portion of its former routing north of Caledonia became part of a realigned and extended Route 15. None of Route 15 between Mumford and Scottsville was assigned a designation when the first set of routes in the modern state highway system were assigned in 1924.

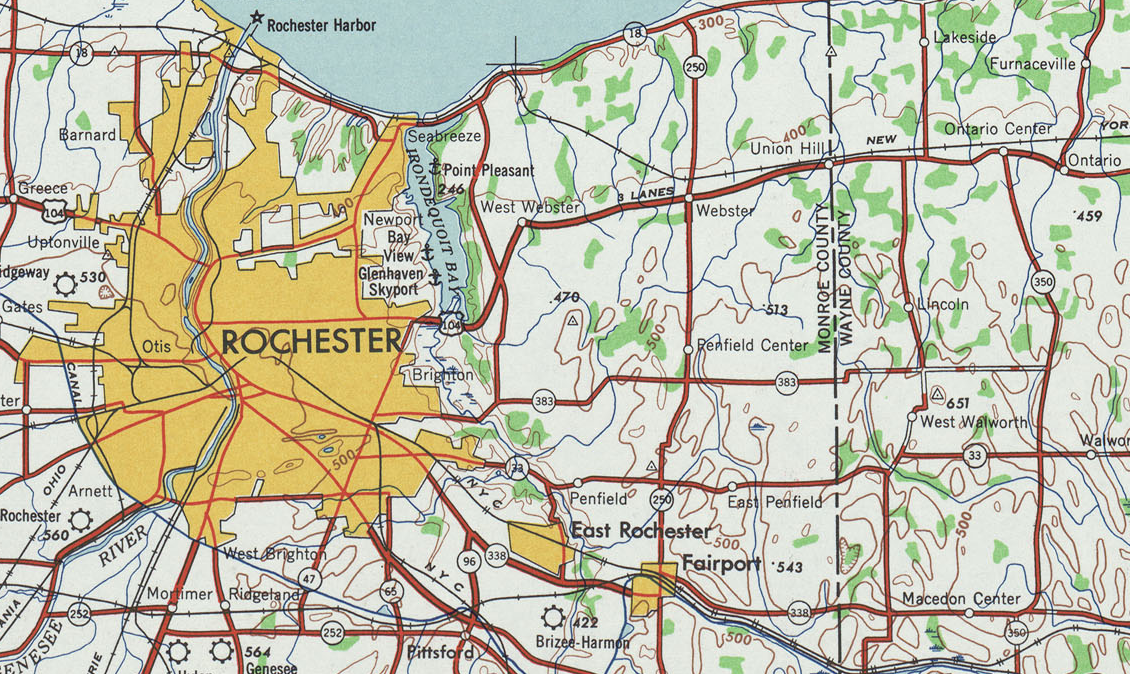
NY 383 originally extended east to Walworth, as shown on this 1947 United States Geological Survey topographic map of Rochester

The portion of former legislative Route 15 from Mumford to Scottsville and the segment of pre-1921 legislative Route 15 on Main Street in Scottsville was designated as the westernmost portion of NY 253, a highway extending from Mumford to Henrietta, as part of the 1930 renumbering of state highways in New York. In Scottsville, NY 253 was concurrent with NY 35, a route stretching from Buffalo to Ontario via Canawaugus (west of Avon), Rochester, and Walworth, on Rochester Street. U.S. Route 20 was rerouted to follow NY 35 between Buffalo and Avon c. 1938. As a result, NY 35 was reconfigured south of Scottsville to follow the routing of NY 253 to Mumford instead, where it ended at NY 36. NY 253 was then truncated to the former northern terminus of its overlap with NY 35 northeast of Scottsville. The NY 35 designation was split into two designations in the early 1940s, with the portion from Mumford to Ontario Center Road in Walworth becoming NY 383. The new route also continued southward for another 2 miles (3.2 km) to NY 5 in Caledonia by way of an overlap with NY 36; however, this extension was eliminated by 1970.

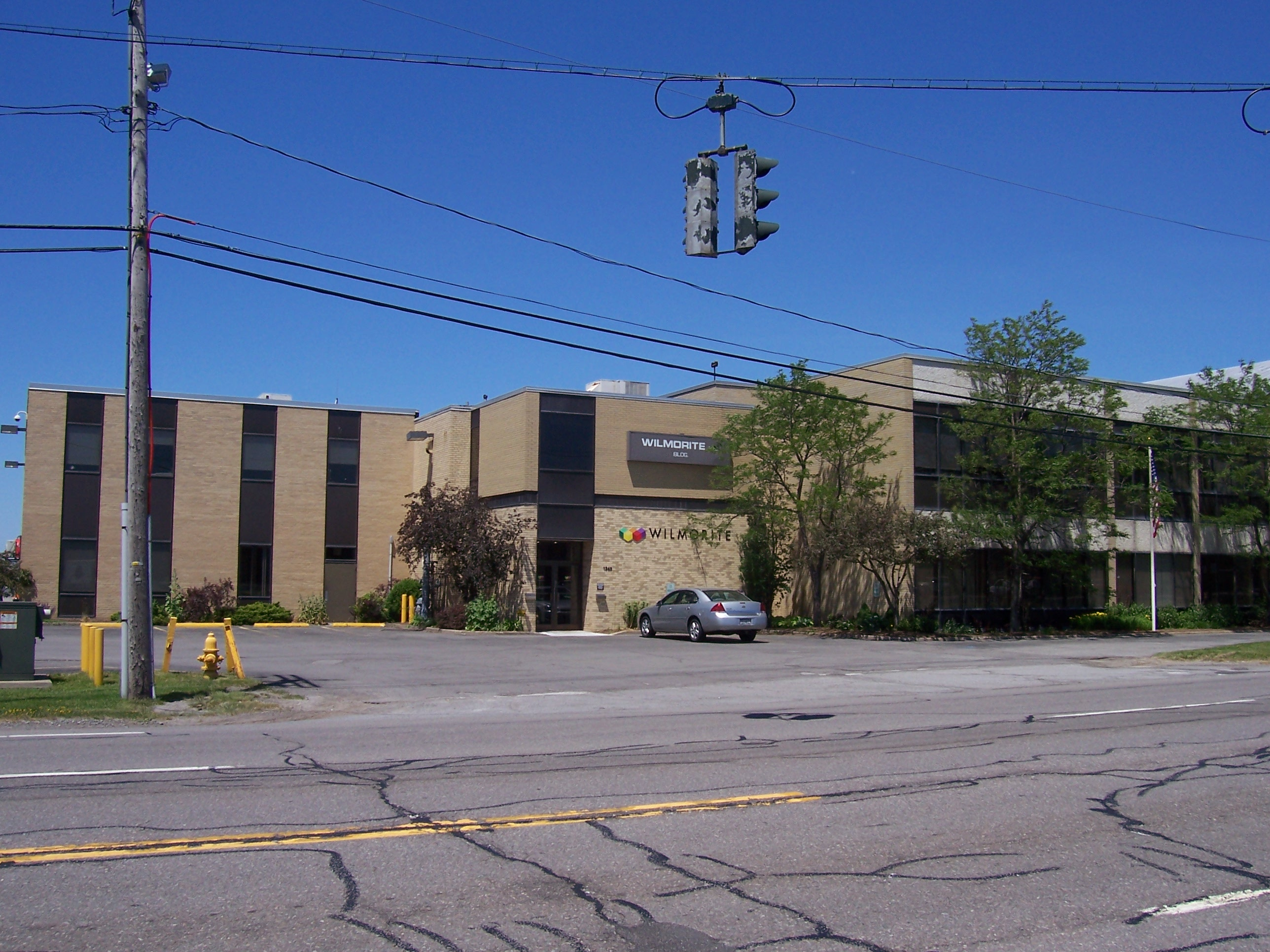
Wilmorite Properties headquarters is located on NY 383

Within Rochester, NY 383 was initially routed on Scottsville Road, Elmwood and Plymouth avenues, Main Street, and Winton Road. At the junction of Winton and Blossom roads, NY 383 turned east to follow Blossom into Penfield. It veered east upon intersecting Browncroft Boulevard to follow modern NY 286 east to Walworth. The portion of NY 383 east of NY 96 (East Avenue) in downtown Rochester became NY 286 on January 1, 1949. At the same time, NY 383 was truncated to the junction of Plymouth Avenue and Main Street in Rochester. NY 383 was further truncated to an interchange with the newly constructed Inner Loop in the mid-1950s.

In the late 1970s, NY 383 was rerouted to follow Ford Street and Exchange Boulevard around the southeastern edge of Rochester's Corn Hill district to a new terminus at Broad Street (NY 31) in downtown Rochester. The route's former alignment on Plymouth Avenue was split into two segments in the late 1980s as part of a larger reconfiguration of Corn Hill's street layout. In the mid-2000s, NY 383 was rerouted between Elmwood and Brooks Avenues to follow Genesee Street instead. This realignment was made out of necessity as a portion of South Plymouth Avenue immediately south of Brooks Avenue was removed as part of the construction of the Brooks Landing riverside development project. Incidentally, Genesee Street was part of the routing used by NY 35, NY 383's predecessor, during the 1930s and 1940s.

== NY 383B ==
New York State Route 383B
- Location: Rochester–Penfield
- Existed: early 1940s–1949

NY 383B was an alternate route of NY 383 between Rochester and Penfield along Browncroft Boulevard. It was renumbered from NY 35B to NY 383B when the portion of NY 35 in the vicinity of Rochester was redesignated as NY 383 in the early 1940s. It was renumbered again to NY 286A in 1949 to match the redesignation of NY 383 east of Rochester to NY 286. Despite the "B" suffix of the route, it is the only suffixed route in NY 383's history—there has never been a "NY 383A".

== Major intersections ==
The entire route is in Monroe County.

Location	mi	km	Destinations	Notes
Wheatland	0.00	0.00	NY 36 – Mumford, Caledonia, Churchville	Southern terminus; hamlet of Mumford
Scottsville	5.73	9.22	NY 386 north (Chili Avenue)	Southern terminus of NY 386
Scottsville	6.21	9.99	NY 251 east (River Road)	Western terminus of NY 251
Scottsville	6.88	11.07	NY 253 east – Henrietta	Western terminus of NY 253
Chili	12.65	20.36	NY 252	
Chili	13.84	22.27	CR 168 (Paul Road)	Former NY 252A
Chili	15.50	24.94	I-390 – Corning, Greece, Airport	Exit 17 on I-390
Rochester	18.70	30.09	NY 31 (East Broad Street)	Northern terminus
1.000 mi = 1.609 km; 1.000 km = 0.621 mi
