= New York State Route 15A =

State highway in western New York, US

New York State Route 15A
- Map of the Finger Lakes region with NY 15A highlighted in red

Route information
- Auxiliary route of NY 15
- Maintained by NYSDOT and the city of Rochester
- Length: 35.19 mi (56.63 km)
- History: Designated NY 2A in 1930; renumbered to NY 15A in April 1939

Major junctions
- South end: NY 15 in Springwater
- US 20A in Livonia; US 20 / NY 5 in Lima; I-390 in Henrietta; I-390 in Brighton
- North end: NY 15 in Rochester

Location
- Country: United States
- State: New York
- Counties: Livingston, Ontario, Monroe

Highway system
- New York Highways; Interstate; US; State; Reference; Parkways
← NY 15	→ NY 16

New York State Route 15A (NY 15A) is a north–south state highway located in the western portion of New York in the United States. It serves as an easterly alternate route of NY 15, beginning in the Livingston County town of Springwater and ending 35.19 miles (56.63 km) to the north in the Monroe County city of Rochester. NY 15A meets U.S. Route 20A (US 20A) in the hamlet of Hemlock, US 20 and NY 5 in the village of Lima, and Interstate 390 (I-390) twice in Henrietta and Brighton. Its southern and middle sections traverse mostly rural areas, while the northernmost piece in Henrietta, Brighton, and Rochester passes through significantly more developed areas.

From 1927 to the late 1930s, modern NY 15 was part of NY 2. As a result, all of what is now NY 15A was originally designated as New York State Route 2A as part of the 1930 renumbering of state highways in New York. Two parts of the route were sub-standard at the time; however, those sections were rebuilt in the early and mid-1930s. NY 2 was supplanted by an extended US 15 in April 1939, at which time NY 2A was renumbered to NY 15A to match its parent's new designation.

== Route description ==
=== Livingston and Ontario Counties ===
NY 15A begins at an intersection with NY 15 in the town of Springwater hamlet of the same name, also officially known as Springwater Hamlet, located on the east side of a large valley in southeastern Livingston County. The route heads northward as North Main Street, proceeding along the eastern base of the valley as it passes through the northern half of the community. Outside of the hamlet, NY 15A enters a rural, undeveloped area dominated by dense forests to the east and a low-lying, slightly more open area to the west. As the route approaches the Livingston–Ontario county line, the lowlands give way to marshes, which in turn lead to Hemlock Lake at the county line. While in Ontario County in the town of Canadice, NY 15A follows a more inland route to the east, passing through an isolated forest situated between Hemlock and Canadice Lakes. After 6 miles (10 km), the highway reenters Livingston County near the northern end of Hemlock Lake.

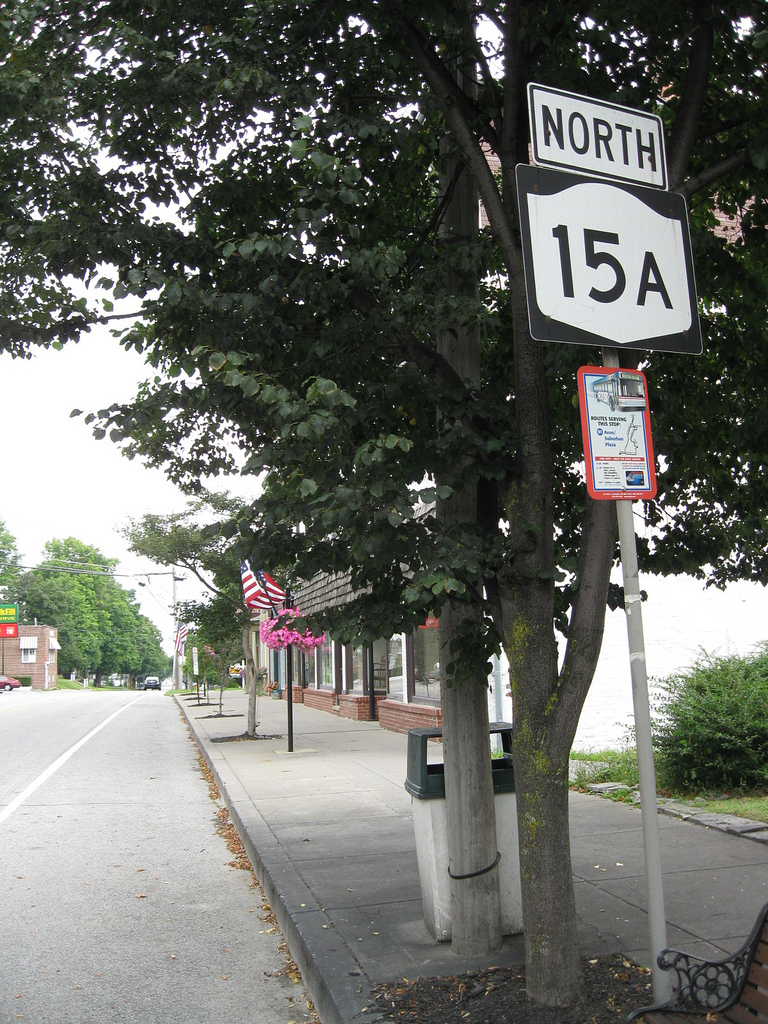
NY 15A northbound in the village of Lima

Now in the town of Livonia, NY 15A becomes Bald Hill Road as it passes by Hemlock Lake Park, a local park situated at the northeastern tip of the lake. It changes names again just 1.5 miles (2.4 km) later upon entering the hamlet of Hemlock. Here, it becomes Main Street and intersects US 20A, which forms a concurrency with NY 15A along the length of Main Street. The concurrency continues through Hemlock and into rural Livonia, where the 2-mile (3.2 km) overlap ends as US 20A turns west towards Buffalo. NY 15A, meanwhile, heads northward into the town of Lima as Plank Road. It continues across rural terrain for another 3 miles (5 km) to the village of Lima, where it becomes Lake Avenue. At the village center, NY 15A crosses over US 20 and NY 5 and changes names to Rochester Street. The route leaves the community and its residential surroundings after 0.75 miles (1.21 km), but retains the Rochester Street name until it reaches the Livingston–Monroe county line west of Honeoye Falls.

=== Monroe County ===
Across the county line in the town of Mendon, NY 15A takes on the name Rush–Lima Road and begins curving to the northwest. It connects to Honeoye Falls twice: first via Main Street at a junction just north of the county line, and later by way of Monroe Street (formerly NY 363) at an intersection 1 mile (1.6 km) to the northwest. Past Monroe Street, the route makes a long, significant turn to the west, following Honeoye Creek into the town of Rush and the hamlet of the same name. The highway meets Rush–West Rush Road at an intersection south of the community, at which point NY 15A turns back to the north and crosses over Honeoye Creek. In the process, NY 15A becomes East Henrietta Road, a name the highway retains until its northern end in Rochester. On the opposite side of the creek, NY 15A intersects NY 251 in the center of Rush.

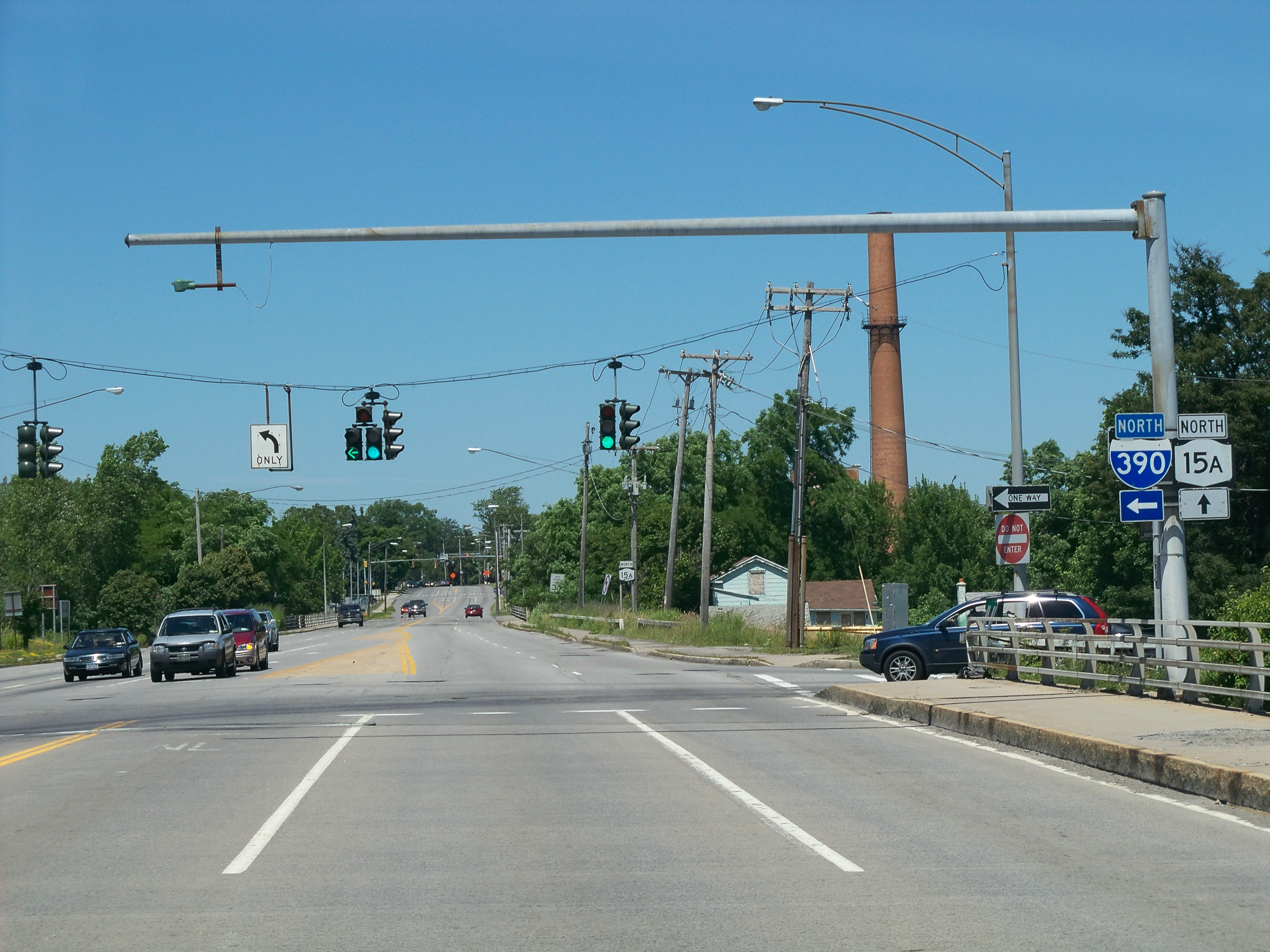
NY 15A northbound at I-390 in Brighton. The Erie Canal and the city of Rochester are in the background.

Outside of Rush, NY 15A takes on a more northeasterly alignment as it passes Rush's town reservoir and enters the town of Henrietta. The surroundings initially remain as rural as they were in Rush; however, the amount of development along the highway gradually increases as the route approaches and passes over the New York State Thruway (I-90). One mile (1.6 km) later, NY 15A intersects NY 253 in a densely populated area west of Rush–Henrietta Senior High School. The homes continue for another 0.5 miles (0.8 km) to the Monroe County Fairgrounds (home to The Dome Center), at which point NY 15A begins to become lined with commercial establishments. The trend temporarily ceases around an interchange with I-390—where NY 15A curves northwestward—but resumes ahead of a junction with NY 252, itself a major commercial strip.

North of NY 252, NY 15A passes under the CSX Transportation-owned West Shore Subdivision and crosses into Brighton. Just past the town line, the route connects to Clay and Brighton–Henrietta Town Line Roads by way of a grade-separated intersection 0.25 miles (0 km) north of the railroad overpass. It continues onward, passing along the west side of the sprawling Monroe Community College campus to another interchange with I-390. NY 15A passes over the Erie Canal and enters the city of Rochester shortly afterward. Once in the city, the route passes by two large office campuses south of Westfall Road and several blocks of homes north of the street before merging back into NY 15 (Mount Hope Avenue) at a junction east of Strong Memorial Hospital.

== History ==
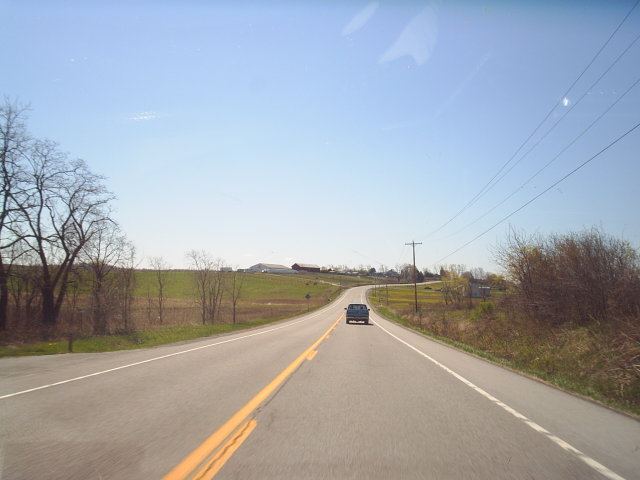
Southbound on NY 15A across rolling terrain in the town of Livonia

What is now NY 15 was originally designated as part of NY 4 when the first set of posted routes in New York were assigned in 1924. The route was renumbered to NY 2 in 1927 to eliminate numerical duplication with the new US 4 in eastern New York. Modern NY 15A, meanwhile, was only partially state-maintained by the mid-1920s. In 1926, only two sections of the route were state-owned: from Monroe Street west of Honeoye Falls north to Rochester, and the segment of highway in Livonia that modern NY 15A shares with US 20A. In spite of this fact, all of what is now NY 15A was designated as NY 2A, an alternate route of NY 2 between Springwater and Rochester, in the 1930 renumbering of state highways in New York.

The sub-standard sections of the route between Springwater and Hemlock and from north of Hemlock to Honeoye Falls were improved in stages over the next half-decade, beginning with the piece between the villages of Lima and Honeoye Falls c. 1931. The remainder of the Hemlock–Honeoye Falls segment and the entirety of the route south of Hemlock was rebuilt c. 1934. NY 2 was replaced in April 1939 by US 15, which was extended northward from its previous terminus at the Pennsylvania state line to Rochester. NY 2A was renumbered to NY 15A as a result. NY 15A has not been substantially altered since that time.

== Major intersections ==
County	Location	mi	km	Destinations	Notes
Livingston	Springwater	0.00	0.00	NY 15 – Wayland, Livonia	Southern terminus; hamlet of Springwater
Ontario	No major junctions				
Livingston	Town of Livonia	10.81	17.40	US 20A east – Honeoye	Southern terminus of US 20A / NY 15A overlap; hamlet of Hemlock
Livingston	Town of Livonia	12.86	20.70	US 20A west – Livonia	Northern terminus of US 20A / NY 15A overlap
Livingston	Village of Lima	18.78	30.22	US 20 / NY 5 (Main Street)	
Monroe	Mendon	21.59	34.75	NY 940D (West Main Street) – Honeoye Falls	Southern terminus of unsigned NY 940D
Monroe	Mendon	24.96	40.17	NY 940J (Monroe Street) – Honeoye Falls	Western terminus of unsigned NY 940J; designated as NY 363 from 1932 to late 1950s
Monroe	Rush	26.04	41.91	NY 251 (Rush-Scotsville Road / Rush-Mendon Road) to I-390	
Monroe	Henrietta	30.73	49.46	NY 253 (Lehigh Station Road) to I-90	
Monroe	Henrietta	32.50	52.30	I-390 to I-90	Exit 14 (I-390)
Monroe	Henrietta	32.72	52.66	NY 252 (Jefferson Road)	
Monroe	Brighton	34.18	55.01	I-390 to I-590 north	Exit 16 (I-390)
Monroe	Rochester	35.19	56.63	NY 15 (Mount Hope Avenue)	Northern terminus
1.000 mi = 1.609 km; 1.000 km = 0.621 mi: Concurrency terminus
