= New York State Route 252 =

State highway in Monroe County, New York, US

New York State Route 252
- Map of Rochester with NY 252 highlighted in red

Route information
- Maintained by NYSDOT
- Length: 12.95 mi (20.84 km)
- Existed: early 1930s–present

Major junctions
- West end: NY 33A in Chili
- I-390 in Henrietta
- East end: NY 64 / NY 96 in Pittsford

Location
- Country: United States
- State: New York
- Counties: Monroe

Highway system
- New York Highways; Interstate; US; State; Reference; Parkways
← NY 251	→ NY 252A

New York State Route 252 (NY 252) is an east–west state highway south of Rochester in Monroe County, New York, in the United States. The western terminus of the route is at an intersection with NY 33A in Chili and the eastern terminus is at a junction with NY 64 and NY 96 in the village of Pittsford. NY 252 passes through the center of the town of Henrietta's commercial district, where it intersects NY 15. The route passes through three distinct areas: a lightly populated, rural area of Chili west of the Genesee River, the heavily developed commercial district centered on NY 252's intersections with NY 15 and NY 15A, and a mostly residential area of the town of Pittsford.

When NY 252 was assigned in the early 1930s, it extended from Scottsville Road (NY 383) in Chili to the village of Pittsford. NY 252 was extended northwest to Chili Center in 1949 by way of modern NY 252A, and east to Bushnell's Basin in November 1955 after NY 96 was realigned onto part of the Eastern Expressway. The route was shifted southward onto its present alignment through Chili in the late 1950s and cut back to Pittsford c. 1961. The segment of NY 252 west of NY 383 was initially county-maintained; however, ownership and maintenance of it were transferred to the state of New York in 2007.

== Route description ==
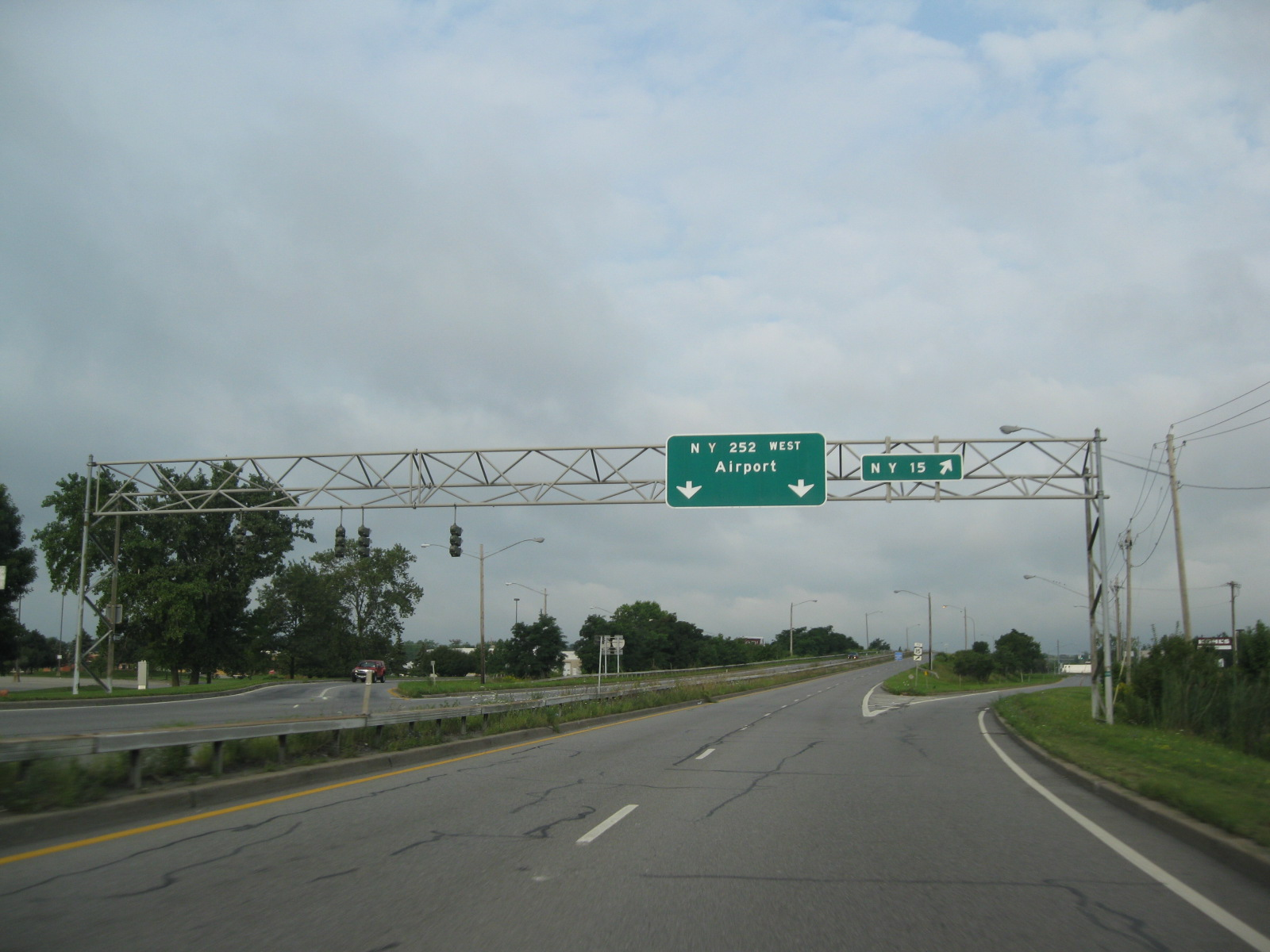
NY 252 at its interchange with NY 15 in Henrietta

NY 252 begins at an intersection with NY 33A in the Monroe County town of Chili. The route heads eastward, following Beaver Road through a sparsely populated area of Chili. About 0.5 miles (0.8 km) from NY 33A, NY 252 intersects NY 386. The highway continues onward, partially paralleling Black Creek eastward to an intersection with Archer Road. Here, Beaver Road comes to an end while NY 252 adopts the Archer Road name and heads southeastward, crossing over Black Creek as it approaches Ballantyne Road. At Ballantyne Road, Archer Road terminates and NY 252 changes names once more to Ballantyne Road.

As Ballantyne Road, the route progresses northeastward, paralleling Black Creek as it crosses the Rochester and Southern Railroad. Roughly 0.5 miles (0.8 km) past the railroad crossing, the road curves to the southeast, entering a residential area as it approaches the Genesee River and NY 383 (Scottsville Road), which runs along the river's western bank. At NY 383, NY 252 becomes Jefferson Road, a name that follows NY 252 eastward to its terminus in the village of Pittsford. NY 252 traverses the river and enters the town of Henrietta by way of the Ballantyne Bridge. On the opposite bank of the river, NY 252 intersects East River Road, Scottsville Road's counterpart on the eastern river bank.

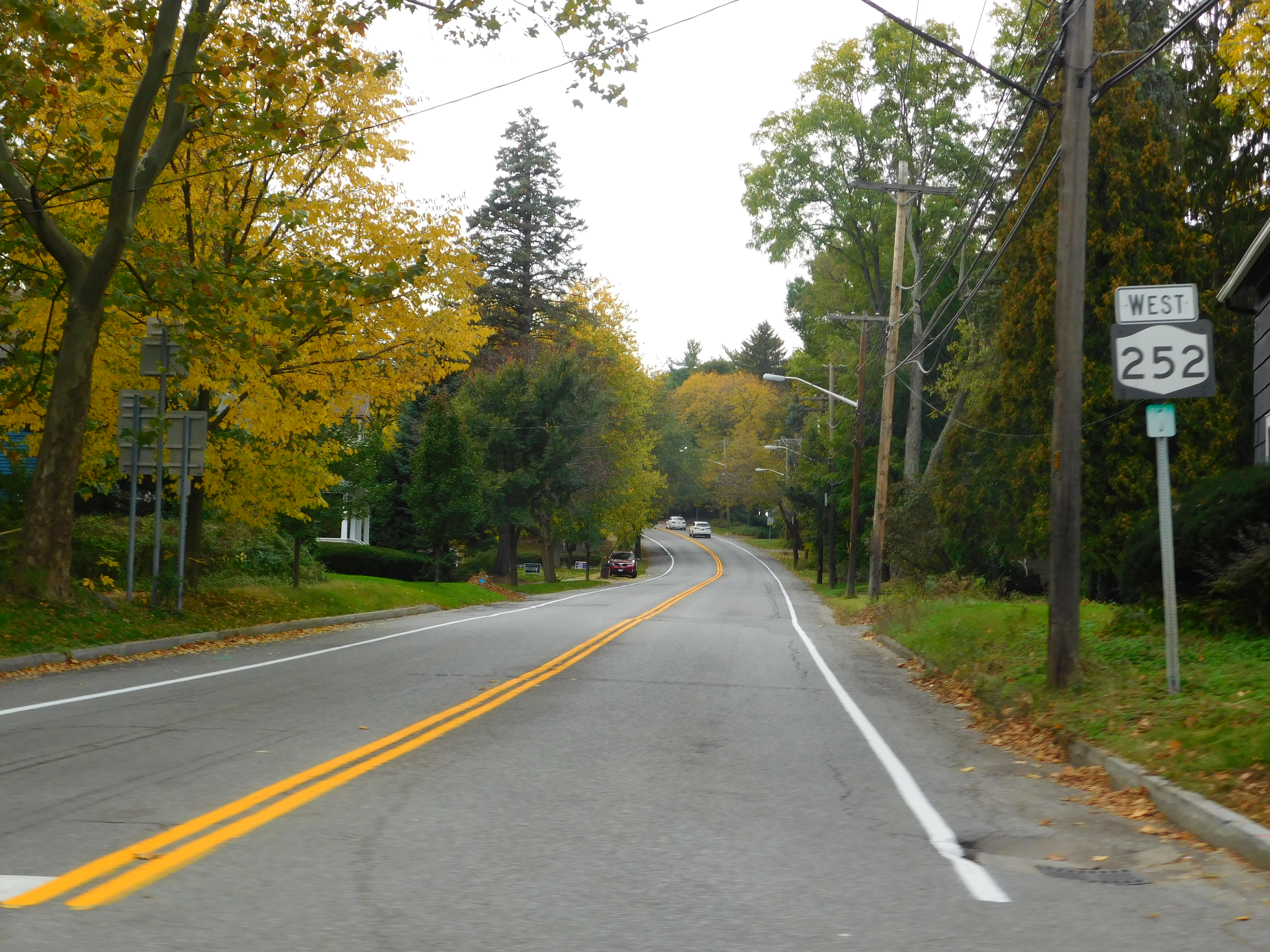
NY 252 east from Pittsford

Just east of the river, the route passes north of the campus of the Rochester Institute of Technology, one of largest colleges in the Rochester area. NY 252 connects to the college by way of Lomb Memorial Drive and Lowenthal Road before proceeding eastward into an area of Henrietta dominated by commercial establishments. From Brighton–Henrietta Town Line Road east to South Winton Road, NY 252 is at least four lanes wide and is lined with plazas, stores, and shopping centers. The approximate center of Henrietta's commercial district is situated near the modified diamond interchange that links NY 252 to NY 15. The Marketplace Mall and South Town Plaza, the two largest shopping centers in the area, are both located in the vicinity of this intersection. NY 252 intersects NY 15A and meets Interstate 390 (I-390) at an interchange prior to intersecting Winton Road.

East of Winton Road, NY 252 narrows to two lanes and enters a highly residential neighborhood. At the Henrietta–Pittsford town line, the route passes the Locust Hill Country Club. Past Locust Hill, NY 252 continues past a series of residential neighborhoods to an intersection with NY 65. East of NY 65, NY 252 becomes West Jefferson Road and briefly enters an area of open, cultivated fields before entering the village of Pittsford. The route heads east for four blocks as a residential street, passing Pittsford Sutherland High School before ending at an intersection with South Main Street (NY 64 and NY 96).

== History ==
=== Designation and maintenance ===
NY 252 was assigned in the early 1930s to the portion of its modern alignment east of Scottsville Road (current NY 383) in Chili. It was extended northwest to NY 33A and then-NY 251 (now NY 386) in the hamlet of Chili Center via Scottsville and Paul roads on January 1, 1949, replacing NY 198. In November 1955, NY 96 was realigned onto the new Eastern Expressway from Bushnell's Basin to East Rochester. Its former surface routing between the village of Pittsford and Bushnell's Basin became part of an extended NY 252. The west end of NY 252 was altered in the late 1950s to follow Ballantyne, Archer, and Beaver Roads between NY 33A and NY 383, while the east end was truncated back to Pittsford c. 1961 when the Eastern Expressway was redesignated as I-490. The former routing of NY 252 along Paul Road was redesignated as NY 252A.

Sometime between 1935 and 1952, Pittsford's and Henrietta's "Jefferson Avenue" (which served as the final stretch of 252) was changed from curving to the intersection with Brighton–Henrietta Townline and Winton Roads after terminating Pinnacle Road, to going an alternate route to end at John Street and Brighton–Henrietta Townline Road near RIT. Until the extension of Jefferson Avenue, 252 had followed Jefferson Avenue and Brighton–Henrietta Townline Road in their entireties. Between 1952 and 1971, Route 15 became transferred from the United States to the NYSDOT. At this time, a new and wider road was built called "Jefferson Road" over land around the existing Brighton–Henrietta Townline Road and Jefferson Avenue in order to directly connect Chili's Ballantyne Road directly to Marketplace Mall. A redesign of the intersection was Route 15 was built, making Route 15 an "exit" off of 252 or a way to do a U-turn on the growing road to the plazas around the Route 15 corridor. Since 1971, NY 252 follows this "Jefferson Road" alignment that was built to widen route between NY 383 and NY 15.

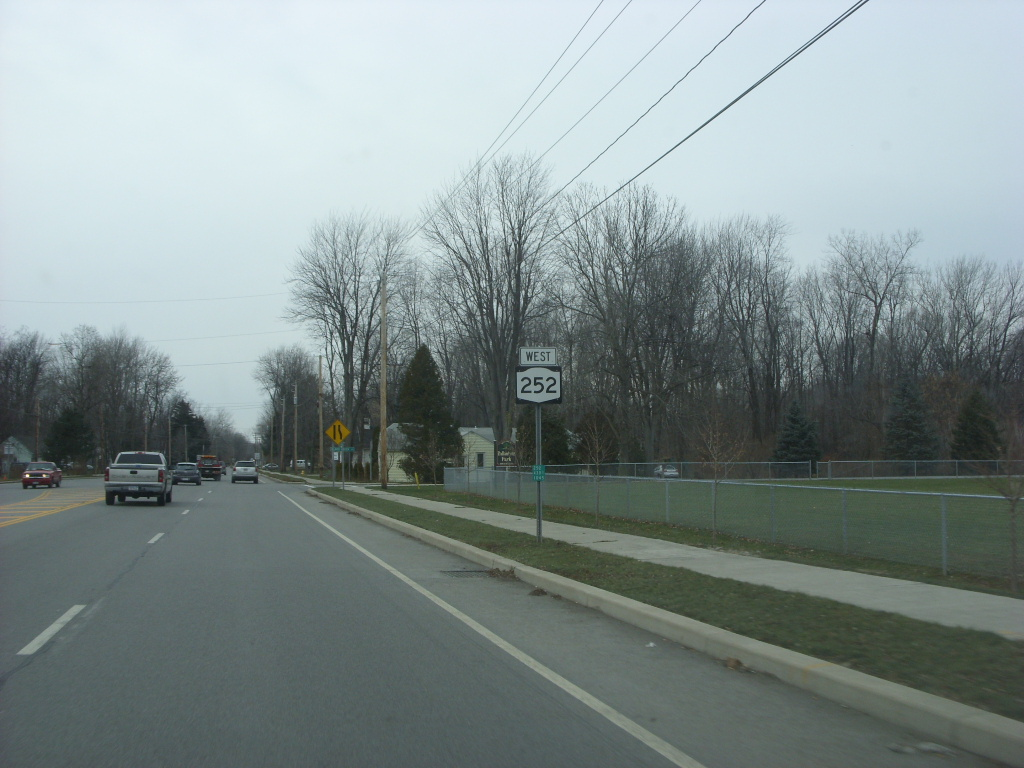
Westbound on NY 252 just west of NY 383 in Chili. This section of the route was transferred to the state of New York in 2007.

The portion of NY 252 west of NY 383 was originally maintained by Monroe County. This section was concurrent with three different county route designations, one for each of the three different road names along this stretch. The portion of NY 252 on Ballantyne Road was designated by Monroe County as County Route 125 (CR 125) while the Beaver Road segment was CR 127 and the Archer Road piece was CR 129. In 2007, ownership and maintenance of NY 252 west of NY 383 was transferred from Monroe County to the state of New York as part of a highway maintenance swap between the two levels of government. A bill (S4856, 2007) to enact the swap was introduced in the New York State Senate on April 23 and passed by both the Senate and the New York State Assembly on June 20. The act was signed into law by Governor Eliot Spitzer on August 28. Under the terms of the act, it took effect 90 days after it was signed into law; thus, the maintenance swap officially took place on November 26, 2007. The entirety of NY 252 is now maintained by the New York State Department of Transportation (NYSDOT).

=== Plat Maps ===
The 1902 Plat Map of Monroe County NY, Plate 21, shows a road in the northeast corner of the Town of Henrietta, called Croton Road, running west from the Pittsford Town border, terminating after about a mine and a quarter at a road now known as Winton Road South. This portion of Croton Road follows the modern alignment of Jefferson Road, Rt. 252. A traveler from Pittsford Village to the Ballentyne bridge over the Genesee River would follow this road to Winton Road, turn north on Winton to the beginning of Brighton-Henrietta Town Line Road, and then follow that road west to the bridge. The 1924 Monroe County Plat Map shows the same road layout, except that Croton Road is called Lothrudge in the Town of Henrietta. But the 1941 Monroe County Plat Map, Vol. 5, Plat 26 and 27, shows the bypass alignment of Jefferson Road, State Highway Route 252, where the former Crodon (or Lothrudge) Road continues directly west of Winton Road South, intersecting East Henrietta Road (State Highway Route 15A), Clay Road, West Henrietta Road (US and State Highway Route 15), where it angles to the northwest and intersects Brighton-Henrietta Town Line Road at Johns Street in the hamlet of Mortimer. The portion of Brighton-Henrietta Town Line Road west of Johns Street, as seen on the 1902 and 1924 Plat Maps, has been renamed Jefferson Road on the 1941 Plat Map. Mortimer is marked as the intersection of the New York Central Rail Road, West Shore Division, running east and west (between Jefferson Road and Brighton-Henrietta Town Line Road), The Rochester and Mount Morris branch of the Erie Railroad, running to the southwest, and the Rochester spur of the Lehigh Valley Railroad, running to the southeast.

=== Widening projects ===
In August 2008, construction began on a $5.5 million project to improve the intersection between Clover Street (NY 65) and Jefferson Road (NY 252) in the town of Pittsford. The project, which had been in development for a decade, involved the widening of Jefferson Road from two to four lanes in the vicinity of the intersection, the addition of green arrow signal lights for all left-hand turns, and the installation of sidewalks alongside both Clover Street and Jefferson Road. Work on the project was temporarily halted during the winter months; however, it resumed on April 1, 2009. The project was completed in late 2009.

The portion of NY 252 in Henrietta between Marketplace Drive and Ridgeland Road was widened from four to six lanes as part of a multi-year, $15.6 million project that began in mid-2009. Phase one of the five-phase project, completed during the second half of 2009, involved the relocation of utility poles and water mains. The next four phases involved the actual widening of the highway. During phase two, all traffic on Jefferson Road was routed along the eastbound lanes while the westbound half of the road was reconstructed and widened; this was reversed during phase three. A raised median between the two directions, which prohibited left-hand turns at all points except signalized intersections, was constructed during phase four, and phase five covered the finishing touches of the project. As part of the project, the intersection between Jefferson Road and East Henrietta Road (NY 15A) was widened to have two dedicated left-turn lanes in all four directions. Work on the last four phases began on March 29, 2010, and was expected to be fully completed in November 2011. Construction did get completed in November 2011, but at the cost of $16.5 million (2012 USD) instead of the original $15.6 million.

== NY 252A ==

NY 252A (4.40 miles or 7.08 kilometres) was an alternate route of NY 252 along Paul Road in the town of Chili. It extended from the eastern terminus of the overlap between NY 33A and NY 386 in the hamlet of Chili Center to NY 383 in the vicinity of the Greater Rochester International Airport. Despite its designation, NY 252A never connected to NY 252. The route existed from the late 1950s to 2009. Its former alignment is now maintained by Monroe County as part of CR 168.

== Major intersections ==
The entire route is in Monroe County.

Location	mi	km	Destinations	Notes
Chili	0.00	0.00	NY 33A (Chili Avenue)	Western terminus
Chili	0.46	0.74	NY 386 (Scottsville–Chili Road)	
Chili	4.55	7.32	NY 383 (Scottsville Road) – Rochester, Scottsville	
Henrietta	6.94	11.17	NY 15 (West Henrietta Road)	Interchange
Henrietta	8.31	13.37	NY 15A (East Henrietta Road) to I-90	
Henrietta	8.52	13.71	I-390 to I-90 – Rochester	Exit 14 (I-390)
Town of Pittsford	11.68	18.80	NY 65 (Clover Street) – Honeoye Falls	
Village of Pittsford	12.95	20.84	NY 64 south (South Main Street) / NY 96 (South Main Street / East Jefferson Road)	Eastern terminus, northern terminus of NY 64
1.000 mi = 1.609 km; 1.000 km = 0.621 mi

== See also ==
- List of county routes in Monroe County, New York
