= New York State Route 252A =

Highway in New York

New York State Route 252A
- Paul Road
- Map of southwestern Rochester with NY 252A highlighted in red

Route information
- Auxiliary route of NY 252
- Maintained by Monroe County
- Length: 4.40 mi (7.08 km)
- Existed: late 1950s–July 1, 2009

Major junctions
- West end: NY 33A / NY 386 in Chili
- East end: NY 383 in Chili

Location
- Country: United States
- State: New York
- Counties: Monroe

Highway system
- New York Highways; Interstate; US; State; Reference; Parkways
← NY 252	→ NY 253

New York State Route 252A (NY 252A) was an east–west state highway located entirely within the town of Chili in Monroe County, New York, in the United States. The western terminus of the route was at an intersection with NY 33A and NY 386 in the hamlet of Chili Center. Its eastern terminus was at a junction with NY 383 near the Greater Rochester International Airport. NY 252A was known as Paul Road and was a 4.40-mile (7.08 km) alternate route of NY 252 through Chili; however, it did not directly connect to NY 252.

NY 252A was originally designated as New York State Route 198 c. 1932. NY 198 became part of NY 252 in 1949; however, NY 252 was realigned in the late 1950s to follow a more southerly alignment through the town of Chili. Its former routing was redesignated as NY 252A. The route was realigned slightly in the late 1960s following an expansion of the Greater Rochester International Airport's primary runway. Ownership and maintenance of NY 252A was transferred from the state of New York to Monroe County as part of a highway maintenance swap that took effect on November 26, 2007, and the NY 252A designation was eliminated on July 1, 2009. NY 252A's former routing is now part of County Route 168 (CR 168), an unsigned route.

== Route description ==
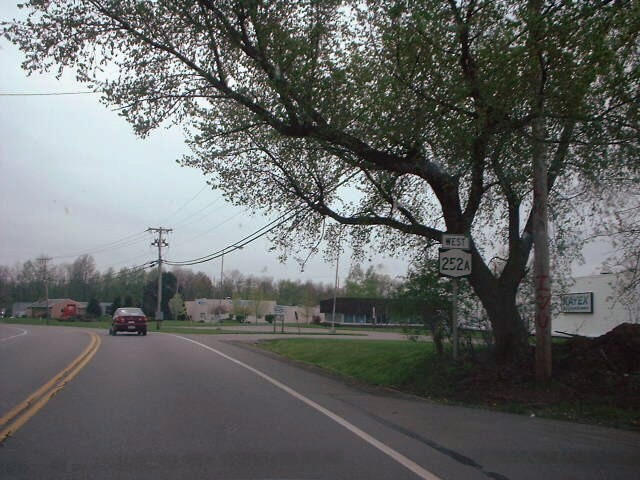
2000 photo of the first reassurance marker on NY 252A westbound

NY 252A began at an intersection with NY 33A and NY 386 in Chili Center, a hamlet located within the town of Chili. The route proceeded eastward from the commercial community and passed through largely residential neighborhoods on its way across Chili. As it approached the Greater Rochester International Airport, the homes were gradually replaced by industrial factories and warehouses. It crossed the Rochester and Southern Railroad in the community of Maplewood just before intersecting Beahan Road, a local road that serves as the western extent of the airport property.

The route, and Paul Road along with it, turned southward at the Beahan Road junction, replacing Beahan Road as the boundary-delimiting highway. This portion of NY 252A formed a "U" as it looped around the southern end of the airport's primary runway. East of the runway, the route gradually curved to the northeast before ending south of the airport at a junction with NY 383 2 miles (3.2 km) southwest of the city of Rochester.

== History ==
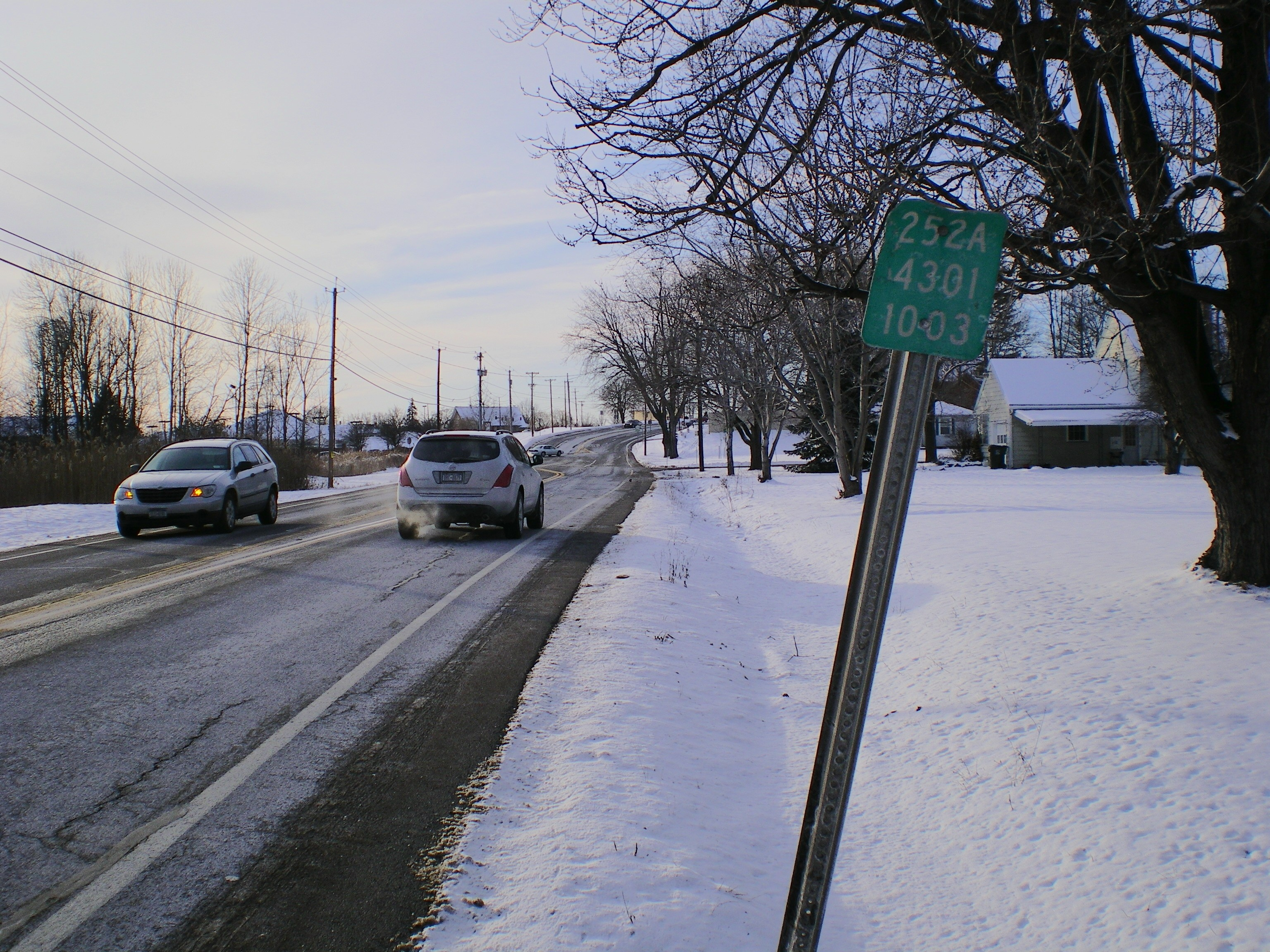
A reference marker on NY 252A westbound near NY 33A and NY 386

The east–west highway connecting the hamlet of Chili Center to the western bank of the Genesee River by way of the community of Maplewood was originally known as Clifton Road. At the time, Clifton Road continued due east from the modern junction of Paul and Beahan Roads to Scottsville Road (now NY 383). It became a state highway on August 6, 1903, following the conclusion of a 13-month project to improve the highway. The Chili Center–Maplewood highway was designated as NY 198 c. 1932.

NY 198 became a westward extension of NY 252 on January 1, 1949, and Clifton Road was renamed to Paul Road in the early 1950s. NY 252 was rerouted in the late 1950s to follow a new, more southerly alignment through Chili. The former routing of NY 252 between Chili Center and NY 383 was redesignated as NY 252A even though it did not directly connect to NY 252, its implied parent route. In the late 1960s, the then-Rochester–Monroe County Airport expanded its primary runway southward across a tract of land that included part of NY 252A's routing. As a result, NY 252A was moved onto a new alignment that circumvented the runway to the south.

In 2007, ownership and maintenance of NY 252A was transferred from the state of New York to Monroe County as part of a highway maintenance swap between the two levels of government. A bill (S4856, 2007) to enact the swap was introduced in the New York State Senate on April 23 and passed by both the Senate and the New York State Assembly on June 20. The act was signed into law by Governor Eliot Spitzer on August 28. Under the terms of the act, it took effect 90 days after it was signed into law; thus, the maintenance swap officially took place on November 26, 2007. NY 252A became concurrent with CR 168, which was extended eastward from its previous terminus at NY 33A and NY 386 in Chili Center to cover NY 252A. The NY 252A designation was removed from CR 168 on July 1, 2009. However, the NY 252A shields remained posted until they were removed by Fall 2010.

== Major intersections ==
The entire route was in Chili, Monroe County.

mi	km	Destinations	Notes
0.00	0.00	NY 33A / NY 386 (Chili Avenue)	Hamlet of Chili Center
4.40	7.08	NY 383 (Scottsville Road)	
1.000 mi = 1.609 km; 1.000 km = 0.621 mi
