= Rush, New York =

- Town
- Location in Monroe County and the state of New York

- Location of New York in the United States
- Coordinates: 43°0′N 77°39′W
- Country: United States
- State: New York
- County: Monroe
- Established: March 13, 1818; 208 years ago

Government
  - Town supervisor: Lee Hankins (D) Town council: Marianne Rizzo (D); David McGlashon (D); Luther Keyes (R); Derek Brown (R)

Area
  - Total: 30.71 sq mi (79.53 km^{2})
  - Land: 30.33 sq mi (78.56 km^{2})
  - Water: 0.37 sq mi (0.97 km^{2})
- Elevation: 579 ft (176 m)

Population (2020)
  - Total: 3,490
  - Density: 115.1/sq mi (44.4/km^{2})
- Time zone: UTC-5 (EST)
  - Summer (DST): UTC-4 (EDT)
- ZIP Codes: 14543 (Rush); 14472 (Honeoye Falls); 14414 (Avon)
- Area code: 585
- FIPS code: 36-055-64144
- Website: www.townofrush.com

Rush is a town in Monroe County, New York, United States. The population was 3,490 at the 2020 census. The town is a suburb of Rochester and is located in the southern part of the county.

== History ==
Rush was established in 1818 from the town of Avon in what was then Genesee County. It was either named after the rushes growing along the creek, or after Dr. Benjamin Rush, a Founding Father of the United States.

== Geography ==
The south and west town lines are the border of Livingston County, with the town of Caledonia on the west and the town of Avon on the south. Rush is bordered by the town of Henrietta to the north. The northern part of the western border is with the town of Wheatland, and the east borders the town of Mendon. Interstate 390 passes through the town, with access from Exit 11 (State Routes 15 and 251).

According to the United States Census Bureau, the town has a total area of 30.7 square miles (80 km^{2}), of which 30.3 square miles (78 km^{2}) are land and 0.4 square miles (1.0 km^{2}), or 1.21%, are water. The Genesee River forms the western border of the town. Honeoye Creek, a tributary of the Genesee, flows east to west through the center of town. The Lehigh Valley Trail follows the creek along the former Lehigh Valley railroad line and extends to the Genesee River.

== Demographics ==
Historical population
Census	Pop.	Note	%±
1820	1,701		—
1830	2,101		23.5%
1840	1,929		−8.2%
1850	2,015		4.5%
1860	1,613		−20.0%
1870	1,654		2.5%
1880	1,741		5.3%
1890	1,095		−37.1%
1900	1,491		36.2%
1910	2,150		44.2%
1920	2,091		−2.7%
1930	1,901		−9.1%
1940	1,791		−5.8%
1950	2,052		14.6%
1960	2,555		24.5%
1970	3,287		28.6%
1980	3,001		−8.7%
1990	3,217		7.2%
2000	3,603		12.0%
2010	3,478		−3.5%
2020	3,490		0.3%

As of the census of 2000, there were 3,603 people, 1,268 households, and 995 families residing in the town. The population density was 118.1 inhabitants per square mile (45.6/km^{2}). There were 1,300 housing units at an average density of 42.6 per square mile (16.4/km^{2}). The racial makeup of the town was 92.62% White, 4.94% African American, 0.36% Native American, 0.83% Asian, 0.44% from other races, and 0.80% from two or more races. Hispanic or Latino of any race were 1.97% of the population.

There were 1,268 households, out of which 32.3% had children under the age of 18 living with them, 68.8% were married couples living together, 6.4% had a female householder with no husband present, and 21.5% were non-families. 15.9% of all households were made up of individuals, and 5.9% had someone living alone who was 65 years of age or older. The average household size was 2.62 and the average family size was 2.94.

In the town, the population was spread out, with 29.3% under the age of 18, 4.3% from 18 to 24, 26.9% from 25 to 44, 28.4% from 45 to 64, and 11.0% who were 65 years of age or older. The median age was 39 years. For every 100 females, there were 119.6 males. For every 100 females age 18 and over, there were 100.0 males.

The median income for a household in the town was $67,632, and the median income for a family was $73,269. Males had a median income of $48,802 versus $39,357 for females. The per capita income for the town was $27,174. About 0.8% of families and 0.5% of the population were below the poverty line, including 0.5% of those under age 18 and none of those age 65 or over.

Barn raising, 1910

== Arts and culture ==
The Rochester & Genesee Valley Railroad Museum on NY 251 in Industry, a hamlet in the western part of the town, preserves local railroad heritage and is connected by a very short-line railroad to the New York Museum of Transportation around the corner on East River Road.

The Lehigh Valley Trail, an east-west trail following Honeoye Creek in the bed of the former Lehigh Valley Railroad, is a popular walking trail in the summer and cross-country skiing trail in the winter. (Motorized vehicles are prohibited.)

Veterans Memorial Park is a popular fishing spot, above and below the falls on Honeoye Creek in Rush hamlet.

The Rush Creekside Inn was built on the site of the former Rush Hotel, which burned down in 1981.

== Government ==
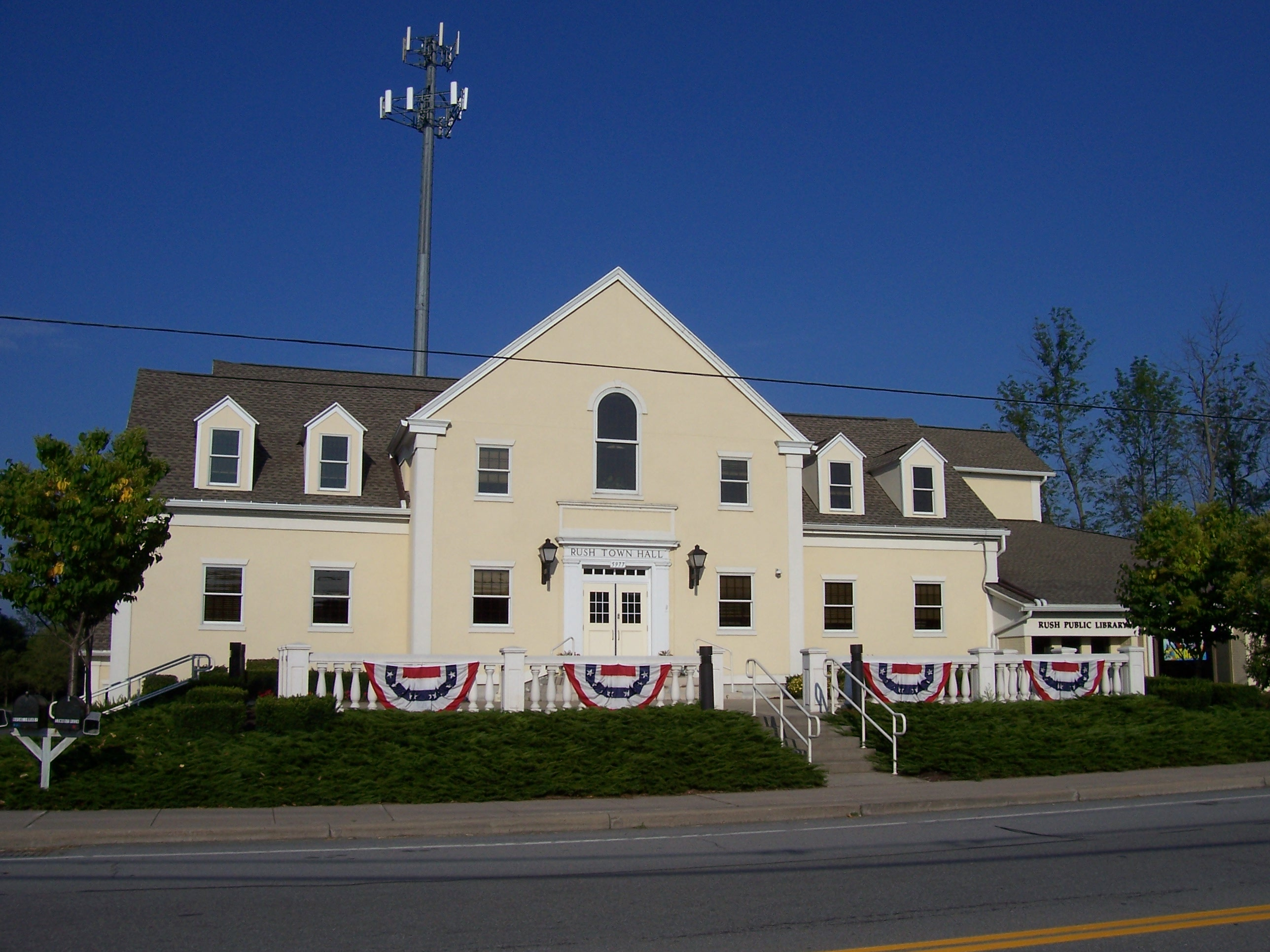
Rush town hall

The town is governed by a town supervisor and four councilpersons, all elected by registered town voters.

== Education ==
=== Primary and secondary schools ===
Public schools in Rush are under the jurisdiction of the Rush-Henrietta Central School District. The district has five elementary schools, two middle schools, a ninth grade academy, and one high school, Rush–Henrietta Senior High School. The district also has an alternative education program. Public schools in the area are also under the jurisdiction of Honeoye Falls-Lima Central School District and Avon Central Schools District.

=== Public libraries ===
The Rush Public Library has been in operation since 1914.

== Notable people ==
- George Coe, 11th lieutenant governor of Michigan
- Mary Galentine Fenner (1839–1903), poet and littérateur
- Gary Lewis, singer

== Communities and locations in the town of Rush ==
- Five Point – A hamlet in the southwest part of the town.
- Golah – A hamlet in the west part of the town.
- Industry – A hamlet west of North Rush on Route 251.
- Manns Corner – A hamlet east of North Rush on Route 251.
- Meadow Wood – A hamlet in the southwest part of the town.
- North Rush – A hamlet in the northwest part of the town on Route 251.
- Rush – The hamlet of Rush in the northeast part of the town.
- West Rush – A hamlet in the western part of the town, west of the interstate.
