= Wheatland, New York =

- Town
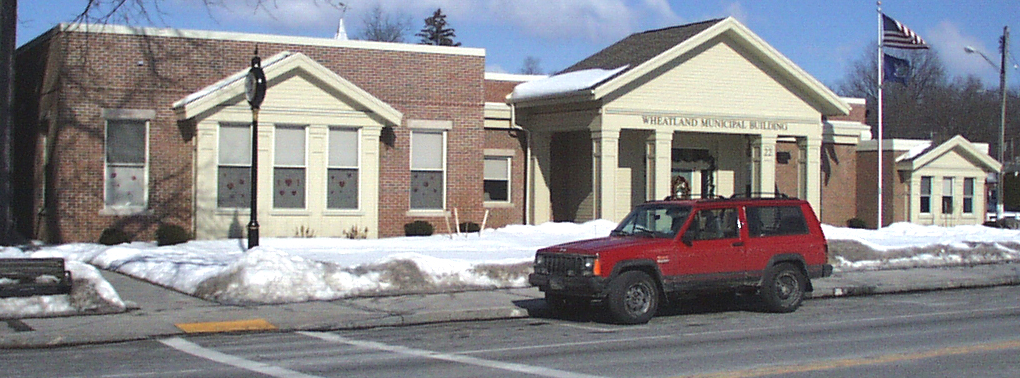
- Wheatland town office building

- Location in Monroe County and the state of New York

- Location of New York in the United States
- Coordinates: 43°00′09″N 77°50′41″W
- Country: United States
- State: New York
- County: Monroe
- Established: February 23, 1821; 205 years ago

Government
  - Town supervisor: Linda M. Dobson (R) First elected 2004 Town council: Tammy L. Spear (R); Roger D. DeWitt (R); Edward Shero (R); Henry W. Williams, Jr. (R)

Area
  - Total: 30.67 sq mi (79.44 km^{2})
  - Land: 30.41 sq mi (78.76 km^{2})
  - Water: 0.26 sq mi (0.68 km^{2})
- Elevation: 605 ft (184 m)

Population (2020)
  - Total: 4,897
  - Density: 161.0/sq mi (62.18/km^{2})
- Time zone: UTC-5 (EST)
  - Summer (DST): UTC-4 (EDT)
- ZIP Codes: 14511 (Mumford); 14546 (Scottsville); 14428 (Churchville); 14482 (Le Roy)
- Area code: 585
- FIPS code: 36-055-81402
- Website: www.townofwheatland.org

Wheatland is a town in Monroe County, New York, United States. The population was 4,897 at the 2020 census. The town is home to Genesee Country Village and Museum.

== History ==
The first settlers arrived circa 1789. The town was established on February 23, 1821, as Inverness, from the town of Caledonia. On April 3, 1821, the state legislature changed the Inverness' name to Wheatland, allegedly at the behest of John Garbutt, a former Englishman markedly devoid of Scottish tendencies.

In those days, the growing of wheat and the manufacture of flour were the county's primary economic activity, and the Wheatland area figured prominently in this trade. The US Census of 1850 notes that the counties of Monroe and Livingston led the entire United States in wheat production.

As the vast agricultural expanses of the American Midwest opened up, the local wheat industry went into decline, beginning in the decade prior to the Civil War. This breakdown was exacerbated by severe adverse weather in the latter 1850s.

The Romanta T. Miller House and Oatka Cemetery were listed on the National Register of Historic Places in 2014.

== Geography ==
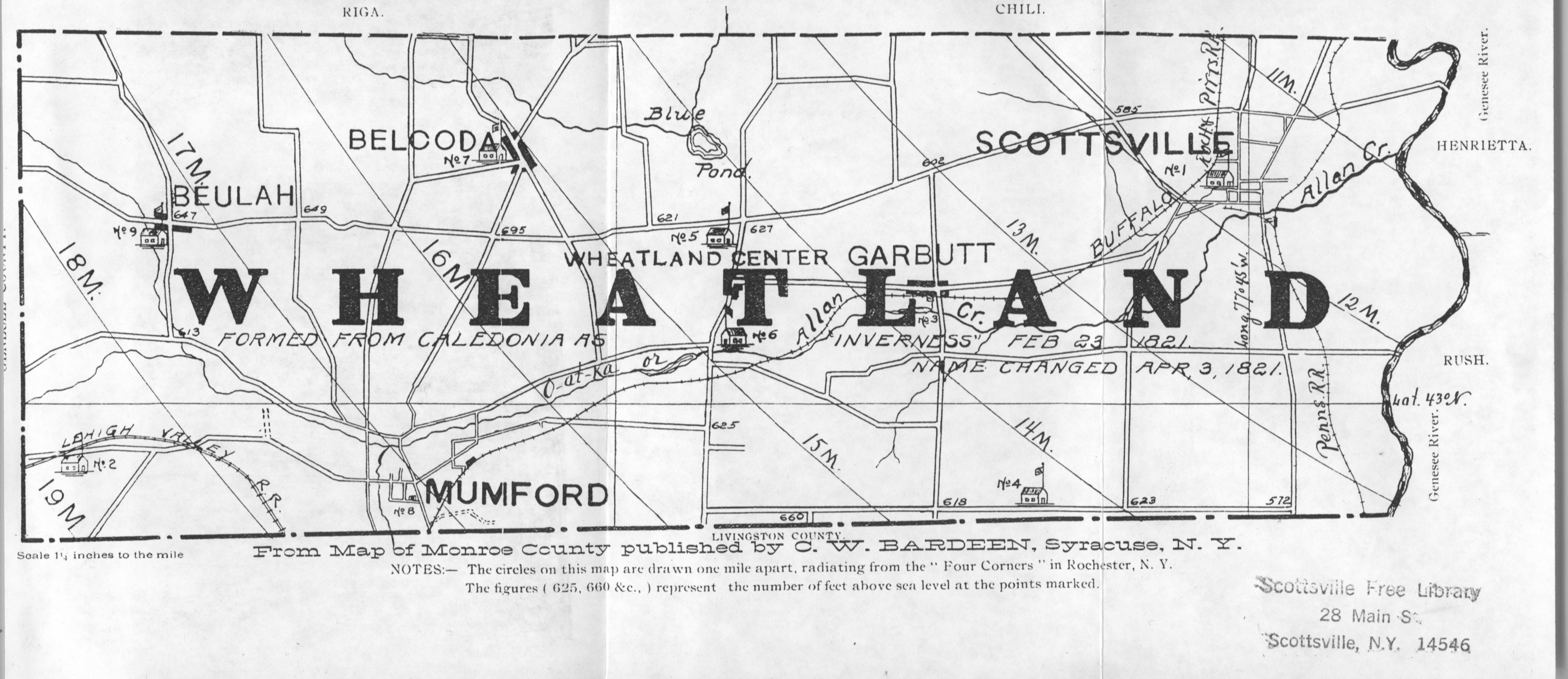
Wheatland in the 19th century

The town of Wheatland is located in the southwest part of Monroe County. It is bordered on the north by the towns of Riga and Chili, on the east by the Genesee River and the towns of Henrietta and Rush, and on the south by the town of Caledonia in Livingston County, and on the west by the town of Le Roy in Genesee County.

According to the U.S. Census Bureau, the town of Wheatland has a total area of 30.7 square miles (80 km^{2}), of which 30.4 square miles (79 km^{2}) are land and 0.3 square miles (0.8 km^{2}), or 0.85%, are water. The terrain includes low rolling hills, with flats along the Genesee River in the east.

Oatka Creek, the only significant waterway in Wheatland and a major component of the town's history, is a tributary of the Genesee River. The New York State Thruway crosses through the northwestern part of the town, with the closest access from Exit 47 (Interstate 490 and State Route 19) in Le Roy.

== Communities and locations ==
- Belcoda – a location north of Mumford
- Beulah – a location in the northwest corner of the town
- Garbutt – a hamlet on Route 383 between Wheatland Center and Scottsville, formerly called Garbuttsville
- Mumford – a hamlet near the south town line in the western part of the town on Route 36. Originally called Mackenzie's Corners, it changed its name to Mumfordville, after one of its citizens.
- Oatka Creek Park – a county park near Garbutt on the Oatka Creek
- Scottsville – a village in the northeast part of the town on Route 383; the sole incorporated community in the town
- Wheatland Center – a former hamlet on Route 383 near the Oatka Creek and once known as Hall's Corners

== Demographics ==
Historical population
Census	Pop.	Note	%±
1830	2,239		—
1840	2,871		28.2%
1850	2,916		1.6%
1860	2,560		−12.2%
1870	2,565		0.2%
1880	2,599		1.3%
1890	2,400		−7.7%
1900	2,071		−13.7%
1910	2,453		18.4%
1920	2,076		−15.4%
1930	2,364		13.9%
1940	2,323		−1.7%
1950	2,502		7.7%
1960	3,711		48.3%
1970	4,265		14.9%
1980	4,897		14.8%
1990	5,093		4.0%
2000	5,149		1.1%
2010	4,775		−7.3%
2020	4,897		2.6%
U.S. Decennial Census

As of the census of 2000, there were 5,149 people (4,960 by the 2007 census estimate), 2,011 households, and 1,425 families residing in the town.

The population density was 168.1 inhabitants per square mile (64.9/km^{2}). There were 2,093 housing units at an average density of 68.3 per square mile (26.4/km^{2}). The racial makeup of the town was 92.99% White, 4.02% African American, 0.39% Native American, 0.82% Asian, 0.06% Pacific Islander, 0.82% from other races, and 0.91% from two or more races. Hispanic or Latino of any race were 2.18% of the population.

There were 2,011 households, of which 33.0% had children under the age of 18 living with them, 57.6% were married couples living together, 9.8% had a female householder with no husband present, and 29.1% were non-families. 22.5% of all households were made up of individuals, and 7.8% had someone living alone who was 65 years of age or older. The average household size was 2.55, and the average family size was 3.02.

In the town, the population was spread out, with 26.5% under the age of 18, 7.4% from 18 to 24, 30.3% from 25 to 44, 24.3% from 45 to 64, and 11.5% who were 65 years of age or older. The median age was 37 years. For every 100 females, there were 94.2 males. For every 100 females age 18 and over, there were 91.6 males.

The median income for a household in the town was $55,239, and the median income for a family was $63,297. Males had a median income of $41,733 versus $30,733 for females. The per capita income for the town was $24,024. About 2.1% of families and 3.5% of the population were below the poverty line, including 5.2% of those under age 18 and 2.0% of those age 65 or over.

== Education ==
Public schools are under the jurisdiction of the Wheatland-Chili Central School District, and include an elementary school, middle school and high school.

== Government ==
The town is governed by a town board, consisting of a town supervisor and four town council members, all elected by registered town voters. The supervisor is elected every two years. Other board members serve four-year terms.

== Public services ==
The Scottsville Free Library, at 28 Main Street, serves the village, town, and outlying areas.
