= Legislative route =

Type of highway

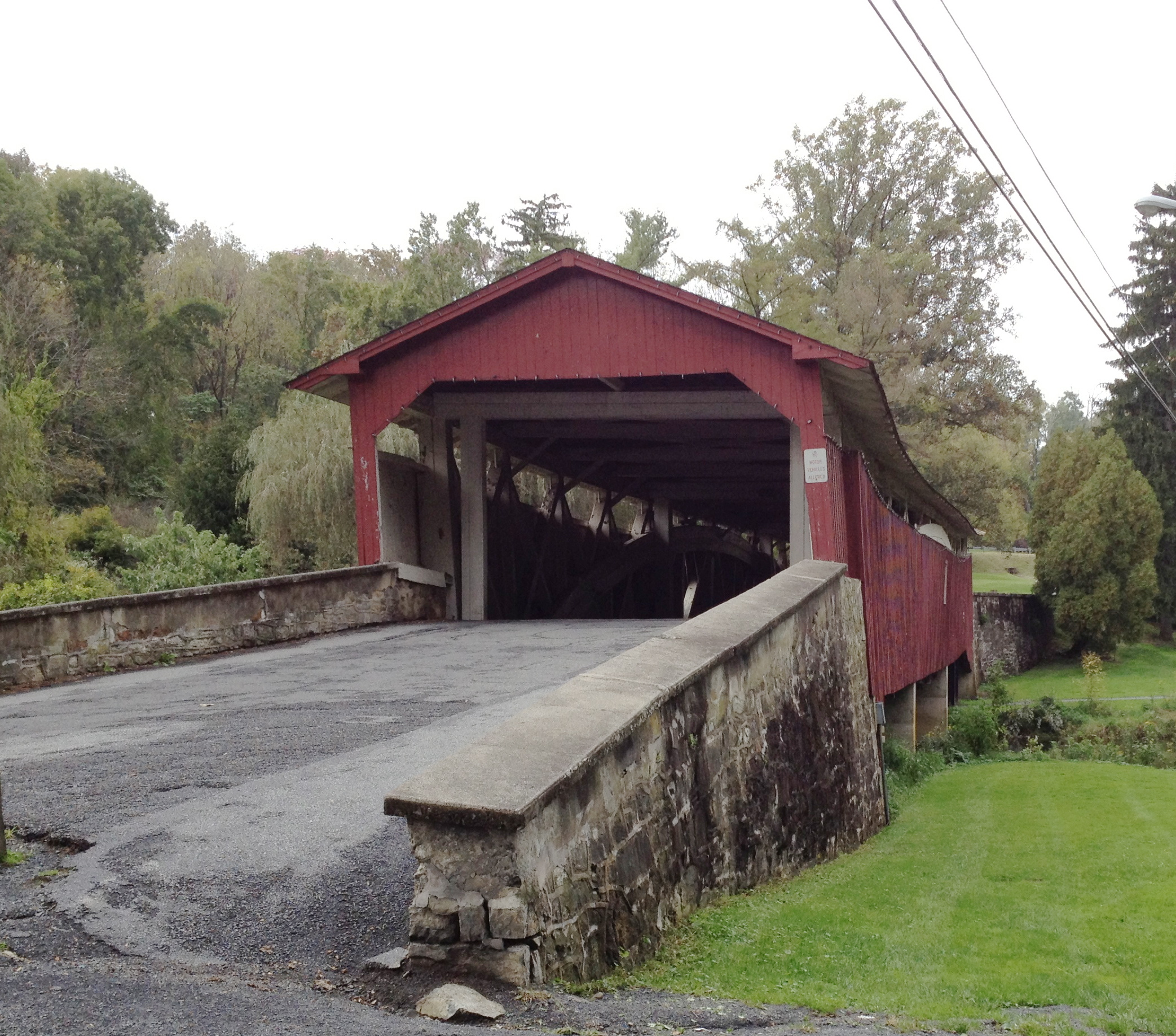
Bogert's Bridge, a bridge that is part of a legislative route outside of Allentown, Pennsylvania

In the United States, a legislative route (LR) or legislative highway is a highway defined by laws passed in a state legislature. The numbering of such highways may or may not correspond to the numbers familiar to the public as part of the state, U.S. highway, and Interstate highway systems. Legislative routes may be composed of several such roads, and conversely, state, U.S., and Interstate highways may be made up of several legislative routes. Minnesota also had highways defined in an amendment to the Minnesota State Constitution in 1920, and those roads are known as constitutional routes.
