= New York State Route 31F =

Highway in New York

New York State Route 31F
- Map of the Rochester area with NY 31F highlighted in red

Route information
- Auxiliary route of NY 31
- Maintained by NYSDOT, Monroe County, and the village of Fairport
- Length: 13.59 mi (21.87 km)
- Existed: January 1, 1949–present

Major junctions
- West end: NY 96 in Pittsford
- I-490 in Pittsford; NY 250 in Fairport
- East end: NY 31 / NY 350 in Macedon

Location
- Country: United States
- State: New York
- Counties: Monroe, Wayne

Highway system
- New York Highways; Interstate; US; State; Reference; Parkways
← NY 31E	→ NY 32

New York State Route 31F (NY 31F) is an east–west state highway located in the vicinity of Rochester, New York, in the United States. The western terminus of the route is at an intersection with NY 96 north of the Monroe County village of Pittsford. Its eastern terminus is at a junction with NY 31 in the Wayne County hamlet of Macedon. Along the way, NY 31F serves the villages of East Rochester and Fairport and connects to Interstate 490 (I-490) in the town of Pittsford. From Fairport eastward, NY 31F roughly parallels the Erie Canal, which the route crosses over twice: once west of Fairport and again north of Macedon.

The origins of NY 31F date back to 1908 when the modern alignment of the route was designated as part of Route 20 by the New York State Legislature. Route 20, an unsigned legislative route, was rerouted in 1921 to use NY 31 and NY 250 between Macedon and Fairport instead. The section of Route 20's pre-1921 alignment west of modern NY 350 received a designation c. 1931 when it became part of New York State Route 33B, an alternate route of NY 33 (now NY 441) that extended from Pittsford to Walworth via Macedon Center. NY 33 was truncated to end in Rochester in 1949, at which time NY 33B was renumbered to NY 31F and rerouted to end in Macedon.

== Route description ==
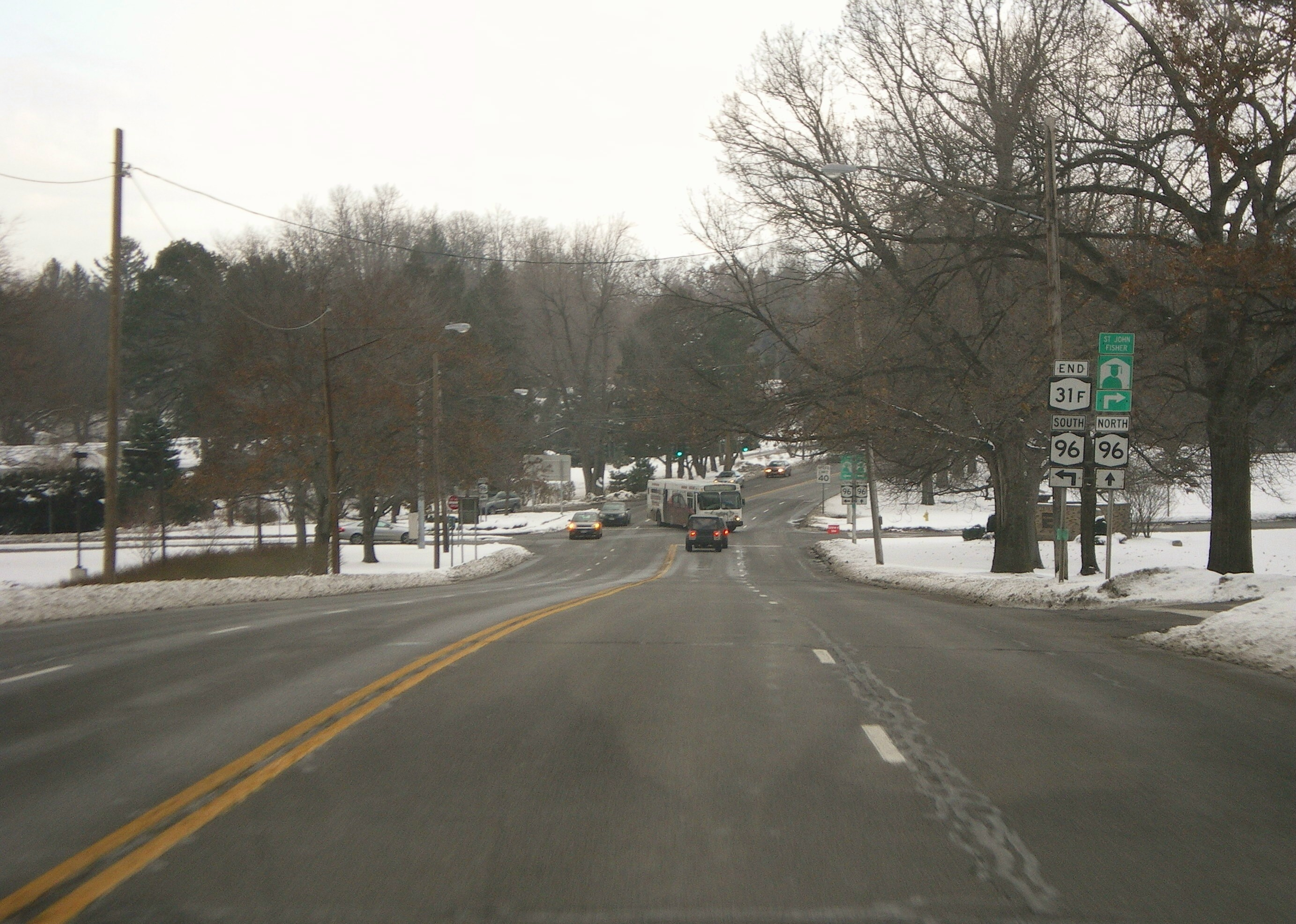
Western terminus of NY 31F at NY 96

Upon separating from NY 96 in the town of Pittsford directly in front of St. John Fisher University, NY 31F becomes Fairport Road, the name that the route dons for its first 3.4 miles (5.5 km). The highway, four lanes wide, heads east, skirting the southern edge of the St. John Fisher campus for a half-mile (0.8 km) before connecting to I-490 at exit 25. Past the expressway, NY 31F begins to straddle the boundary line between the village of East Rochester and the town of Pittsford. After intersecting NY 153, the primary roadway linking East Rochester and the village of Pittsford, NY 31F passes to the south of the East Rochester Union Free School District campus prior to leaving the vicinity of the village and entering Perinton.

Within Perinton, the route initially passes through residential areas similar to those located in East Rochester and Pittsford but soon enters a heavily commercial area centered on the intersection between NY 31F and Jefferson Avenue. During this stretch, the route passes under the CSX Transportation-owned West Shore Subdivision railroad line, here situated on a large embankment. At the eastern edge of the commercial strip, NY 31F narrows to two lanes and crosses over the Erie Canal into Fairport, where it becomes West Church Street.

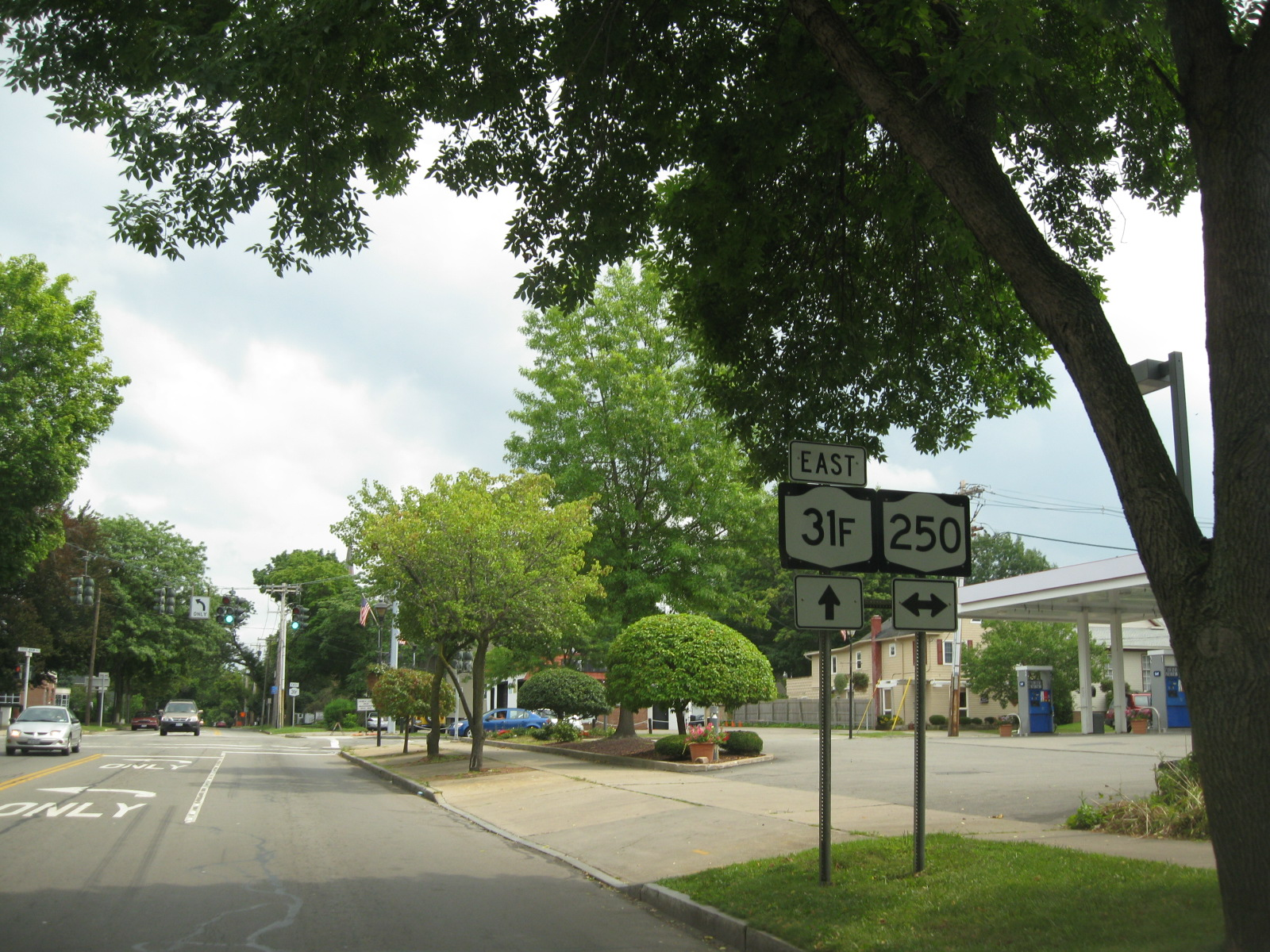
NY 31F eastbound at NY 250 in Fairport

NY 31F continues through the residential western portion of the village to an intersection with NY 250 (South Main Street) just south of the village's business district and adjacent to the First Baptist Church of Fairport. After crossing NY 250, NY 31F becomes East Church Street and begins to parallel the canal as both exit the village. Now solely in Perinton once more, NY 31F cuts to the north along Turk Hill Road, crossing the Erie Canal and the Rochester Subdivision, CSX's main line through the Rochester area, on a large overpass. The route resumes its eastward path at an intersection with High Street in the northeast corner of the village, becoming Macedon Center Road in the process.

East of Fairport, the route becomes predominantly rural in nature in a stark departure from its first 6 miles (10 km). NY 31F heads east on a nearly-linear routing through eastern Perinton and the Wayne County town of Macedon to the hamlet of Macedon Center, located at the junction of NY 31F and Canandaigua Road. Not long after, NY 31F encounters NY 350. Here, NY 31F and NY 350 turn south, concurrently following Ontario Center Road for 1.75 miles (2.82 km) to the village of Macedon, where both NY 31F and NY 350 terminate at NY 31. During this final stretch, NY 31F passes under the CSX main line and over the Erie Canal once again.

Maintenance of NY 31F is split between the New York State Department of Transportation (NYSDOT), the village of Fairport, and Monroe County. The highway is state-maintained from NY 96 east to the Fairport village line, at which point ownership and maintenance of the road shifts to the village. NY 31F becomes a state highway once again at NY 250 and remains NYSDOT-maintained until it turns north onto the county-owned and maintained Turk Hill Road. While on Turk Hill Road, NY 31F overlaps with County Route 50, the designation assigned to the entire length of Turk Hill Road within Monroe County. The remainder of NY 31F east of Turk Hill Road is state-maintained.

== History ==
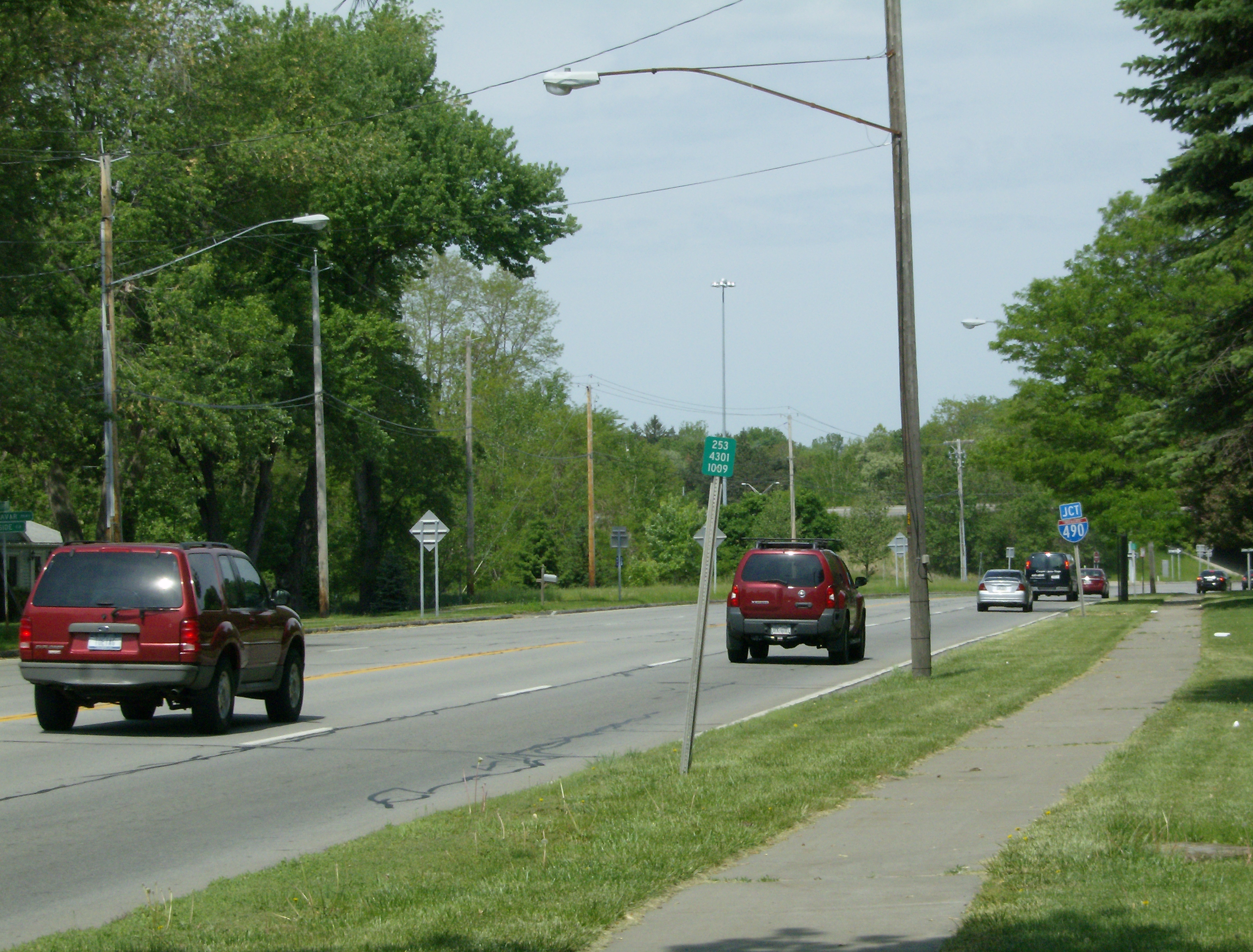
Looking west on NY 31F just east of I-490 in Pittsford. The reference marker alongside the road erroneously reads "253" for NY 253

All of what is now NY 31F was originally designated as part of Route 20, an unsigned legislative route, by the New York State Legislature in 1908. Route 20 entered the village of Macedon on modern NY 31 and continued westward to Rochester on current NY 96. On March 1, 1921, Route 20 was realigned to utilize modern NY 31 and NY 250 between Macedon and Fairport. Although all of modern NY 31F was part of a legislative route at one time and was state-maintained west of Fairport and from Macedon Center to Macedon by 1926, it was not assigned a posted route number until the 1930s.

The portion of current NY 31F west of NY 350 in the town of Macedon was designated as part of NY 33B c. 1931. NY 33B continued north from Macedon on modern NY 350 to an intersection with NY 33 (now NY 441) in Walworth. NY 350 was assigned by the following year; however, it was initially confined to the segment it now shares with NY 31F between NY 31 in the village of Macedon and then-NY 33B. NY 350 was extended northward to Ontario Center in the early 1940s, overlapping NY 33B from Macedon to Walworth. NY 33 was truncated westward to Rochester on January 1, 1949. As a result, NY 33B was renumbered to NY 31F and rerouted east of Macedon Center to travel south along NY 350 to Macedon, where it connected to NY 31.

The first section of the Eastern Expressway (now I-490) opened in November 1955 extending from NY 31F south to NY 96 in Bushnell's Basin. Initially, NY 96 was realigned to follow the freeway between the two locations and Fairport Road between the north end of the freeway and its original routing on East Avenue. As a result, NY 31F was truncated to begin at the new freeway. The latter change was short-lived, however, as NY 31F was re-extended to its original terminus c. 1957 after NY 96 was moved onto a northwestern extension of the Eastern Expressway to what is now the Can of Worms in Rochester.

NY 31F originally ran through the center of Fairport, turning north at NY 250 and sharing Main Street with NY 250 on a short concurrency between Church Street and High Street. NY 31F turned east at High Street and followed it to Turk Hill Road, where NY 31F continued east on its current alignment. The route was realigned onto its current alignment through Fairport on April 1, 1984, as a result of a highway maintenance swap between the state of New York and the village of Fairport. In the swap, ownership and maintenance of High Street was transferred from the state to Fairport in exchange for control over the portion of East Church Street between NY 250 and Turk Hill Road.

== Major intersections ==
County	Location	mi	km	Destinations	Notes
Monroe	Town of Pittsford	0.00	0.00	NY 96	Western terminus
Monroe	Town of Pittsford	0.63	1.01	I-490 to New York Thruway – Victor, Rochester	Exit 25 (I-490)
Monroe	East Rochester	1.06	1.71	NY 153 – East Rochester, Pittsford	
Monroe	Fairport	4.10	6.60	NY 250	
Wayne	Town of Macedon	11.86	19.09	NY 350 north	Northern terminus of NY 31F / NY 350 overlap
Wayne	Hamlet of Macedon	13.59	21.87	NY 31 / NY 350 north – Palmyra, Rochester	Eastern terminus; southern terminus of NY 31F / NY 350 overlap; southern terminus of NY 350
1.000 mi = 1.609 km; 1.000 km = 0.621 mi: Concurrency terminus
