= New York State Route 65 =

State highway in western New York, US

New York State Route 65
- Map of the Rochester area with NY 65 highlighted in red

Route information
- Maintained by NYSDOT and Monroe County
- Length: 18.51 mi (29.79 km)
- Existed: 1930–present

Major junctions
- South end: US 20 / NY 5 in West Bloomfield
- NY 252 in Pittsford
- North end: NY 96 in Brighton

Location
- Country: United States
- State: New York
- Counties: Ontario, Livingston, Monroe

Highway system
- New York Highways; Interstate; US; State; Reference; Parkways
← NY 64	→ NY 66

New York State Route 65 (NY 65) is a north–south state highway located in the western portion of New York in the United States. It extends for 18.51 miles (29.79 km) from an intersection with U.S. Route 20 (US 20) and NY 5 in the Ontario County town of West Bloomfield to a junction with NY 96 in the Monroe County town of Brighton. In between, the route serves the village of Honeoye Falls and passes through the extreme northeastern corner of Livingston County. NY 65 intersects NY 251 in Mendon, NY 252 in Pittsford, and the regionally important NY 31 in Brighton. The southern half of NY 65 passes through mostly rural areas, while its northern section traverses densely populated portions of Monroe County.

NY 65 originally began at what is now US 20A in Honeoye when it was assigned as part of the 1930 renumbering of state highways in New York; however, it was truncated to its current southern terminus in the late 1930s. No changes have been made to NY 65's alignment since that time; however, ownership and maintenance of the 1.95-mile (3.14 km) portion of the route north of NY 31 was transferred to Monroe County at some point prior to 1990. This section of NY 65 is co-designated as the unsigned County Route 271 (CR 271).

== Route description ==
NY 65 begins at an intersection with US 20 and NY 5 in the West Bloomfield hamlet of the same name. It heads to the northwest as Ontario Street, passing through gradually less developed areas as it approaches the Ontario–Monroe county line. Just south of the line, however, the route enters the hamlet of North Bloomfield, a southeastern extension of Honeoye Falls located on the Livingston–Ontario county line. NY 65 passes into Livingston County in the town of Lima upon crossing over Honeoye Creek in the center of the community; however, it remains in the county for just 0.25 miles (0.40 km) before following Honeoye Creek into Monroe County and the village of Honeoye Falls in the town of Mendon situated on the county's southern edge.

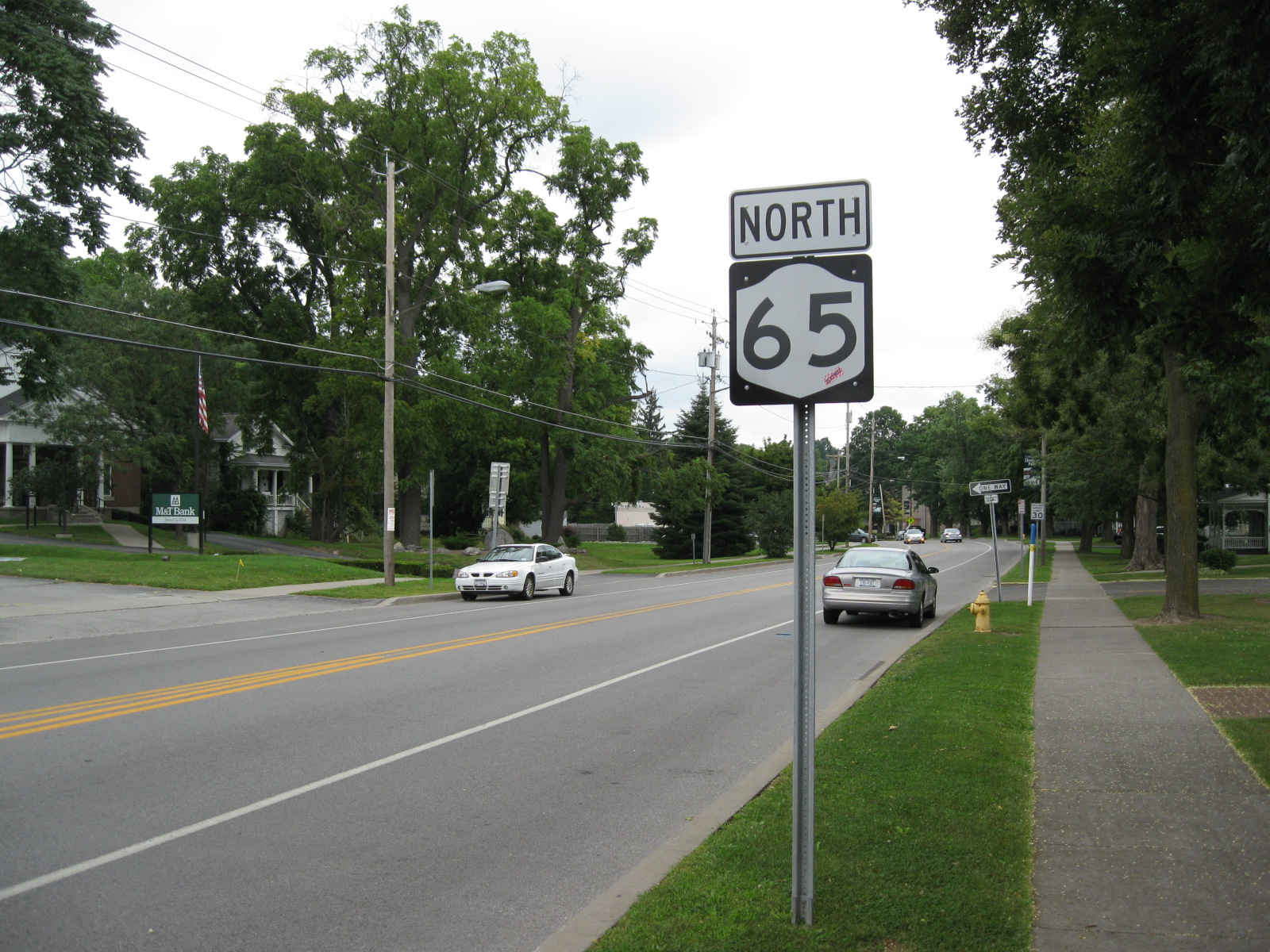
NY 65 heading northbound in the village of Honeoye Falls

The Ontario Street name follows NY 65 northwestward through the southern half of the village, where it crosses back over Honeoye Creek before passing through the village's residential center and entering its business district. Here, NY 65 turns west onto East Street and crosses Honeoye Creek again to reach an intersection with Main and Monroe Streets. Monroe Street, once designated NY 363, is maintained by the New York State Department of Transportation (NYSDOT) as NY 940J, an unsigned reference route. NY 65 turns north here, following North Main Street out of the village. Outside of Honeoye Falls, the route becomes Clover Street, a name it retains for the rest of its routing.

The highway heads onward through the town of Mendon, leaving the densely populated village and its lightly populated outskirts for the rolling, open areas that dominate much of southern Monroe County. Three miles (5 km) to the north of Honeoye Falls, NY 65 intersects NY 251 by way of a roundabout northeast of the hamlet of Rochester Junction. The community, located on NY 251, marks the point where the Lehigh Valley Railroad spur that went to the railroad's station in downtown Rochester returned to the main line. The route continues onward, passing alongside the western edge of Mendon Ponds Park as it enters the town of Pittsford. At the northern edge of the park, NY 65 curves to the northeast and passes over the New York State Thruway (Interstate 90).

North of the Thruway, NY 65 intersects the eastern terminus of NY 253 and Calkins Road (unsigned NY 943C and a former extension of NY 253) at junctions roughly 1 mile (1.6 km) apart. From this point northward, the route heads through much more developed areas, beginning with a series of housing tracts situated in the 1.5 miles (2.4 km) between Calkins and Jefferson Roads, the latter carrying NY 252. It continues on past NY 252, taking on a more northerly routing as it crosses over the CSX Transportation-owned West Shore Subdivision railroad line and the Erie Canal and passes through densely populated portions of Pittsford and Brighton.

Just inside the Brighton town line, NY 65 intersects NY 31 (Monroe Avenue) in a linear commercial district centered on NY 31. At this point, maintenance of NY 65 shifts from NYSDOT to Monroe County, which maintains the route as the unsigned CR 271. The route heads due northward for just under 1 mile (1.6 km), paralleling I-590 and passing The Harley School before veering to the northeast ahead of an intersection with Elmwood Avenue. Both NY 65 and CR 271 end 1 mile (1.6 km) later at a junction with East Avenue (NY 96).

== History ==
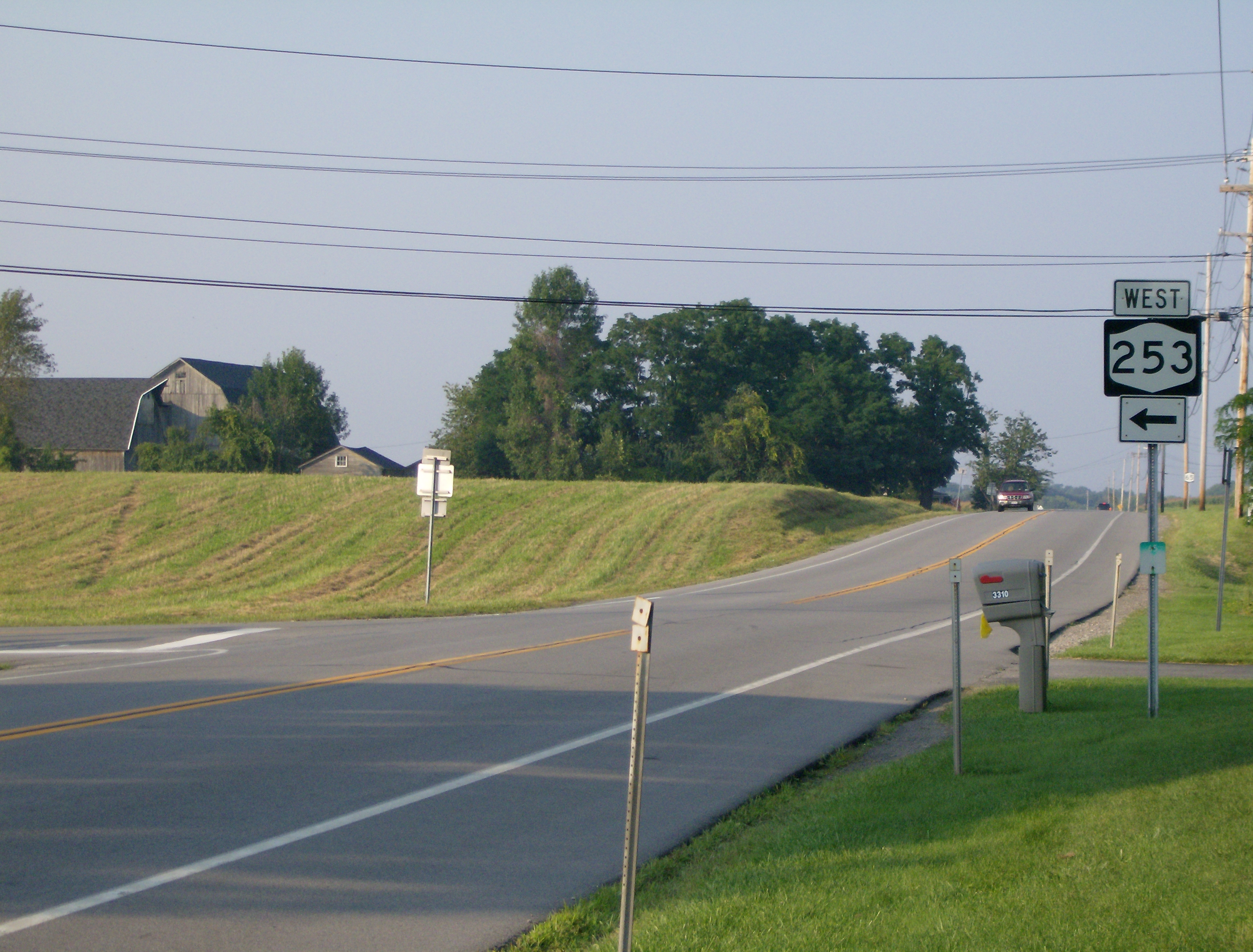
The current eastern terminus of NY 253 at NY 65 in Pittsford. This was once the southern terminus of NY 253's overlap with NY 65.

All of what is now NY 65, including the portion of the route north of modern NY 31, was state-maintained by 1926. In the 1930 renumbering of state highways in New York, NY 65 was assigned to an alignment extending from NY 254 (now US 20A) in Honeoye northward to NY 15 (now NY 96) in Brighton. The route followed the northernmost portion of what is now CR 37 from Honeoye to US 20 in West Bloomfield, from where it continued to Brighton on its current alignment. The section of NY 65 south of US 20, which was not state-owned in 1926, was removed from the route c. 1938. Farther north, ownership and maintenance of the portion of the route north of NY 31 was transferred to Monroe County by 1990.

NY 65 originally had an overlap with NY 253 in the town of Pittsford. From the 1930 renumbering to the 1980s, NY 253 turned north onto NY 65 at its present eastern terminus and followed NY 65 north to Calkins Road, where NY 253 turned east and continued to the northeast toward Pittsford, East Rochester and Penfield. In the latter half of the 1980s, NY 253 was truncated to its present eastern terminus at NY 65 and the section of NY 253 from NY 96 north to NY 441 in East Rochester and Penfield was designated NY 153.

== Major intersections ==
County	Location	mi	km	Destinations	Notes
Ontario	West Bloomfield	0.00	0.00	US 20 / NY 5	Southern terminus
Monroe	Honeoye Falls	4.64	7.47	Monroe Street (NY 940J)	Former eastern terminus of NY 363
Monroe	Mendon	7.55	12.15	NY 251	Roundabout; hamlet of Rochester Junction
Monroe	Town of Pittsford	12.72	20.47	NY 253 west	Eastern terminus of NY 253
Monroe	Town of Pittsford	13.57	21.84	Calkins Road (NY 943C)	Formerly part of NY 253
Monroe	Town of Pittsford	14.91	24.00	NY 252 – Pittsford	
Monroe	Brighton	16.56	26.65	NY 31 to I-590	
Monroe	Brighton	18.51	29.79	NY 96	Northern terminus
1.000 mi = 1.609 km; 1.000 km = 0.621 mi

== See also ==
- List of county routes in Monroe County, New York
