= New York State Route 253 =

State highway in Monroe County, New York, US

New York State Route 253
- NY 253 highlighted in red and former routings maintained as reference routes in blue

Route information
- Maintained by NYSDOT and the town of Henrietta
- Length: 10.83 mi (17.43 km)
- Existed: 1930–present

Major junctions
- West end: NY 383 in Scottsville
- I-90 Toll / New York Thruway / I-390 in Henrietta
- East end: NY 65 in Pittsford

Location
- Country: United States
- State: New York
- Counties: Monroe

Highway system
- New York Highways; Interstate; US; State; Reference; Parkways
← NY 252A	→ NY 254

New York State Route 253 (NY 253) is a 10.83-mile-long (17.43 km) east–west state highway in Monroe County, New York, in the United States. The western terminus of the route is at NY 383 in the village of Scottsville. Its eastern terminus is at NY 65 in the town of Pittsford. NY 253 meets Interstate 390 (I-390) and connects to the New York State Thruway (I-90) in the town of Henrietta. The majority of NY 253 passes through either rural or residential areas; however, the midsection of NY 253 is located in a heavily commercial portion of Henrietta.

NY 253 originally extended from NY 36 in Mumford to NY 64 south of the village of Pittsford when it was assigned as part of the 1930 renumbering of state highways in New York. By 1938, it was truncated to Scottsville on its western end but also extended northeastward to Penfield. The portion of NY 253 through East Rochester and Penfield was realigned twice in the 1960s and 1970s before the route was cut back to NY 65 in Pittsford in the 1980s. Since that time, NY 253 has also been rerouted twice in Henrietta.

== Route description ==
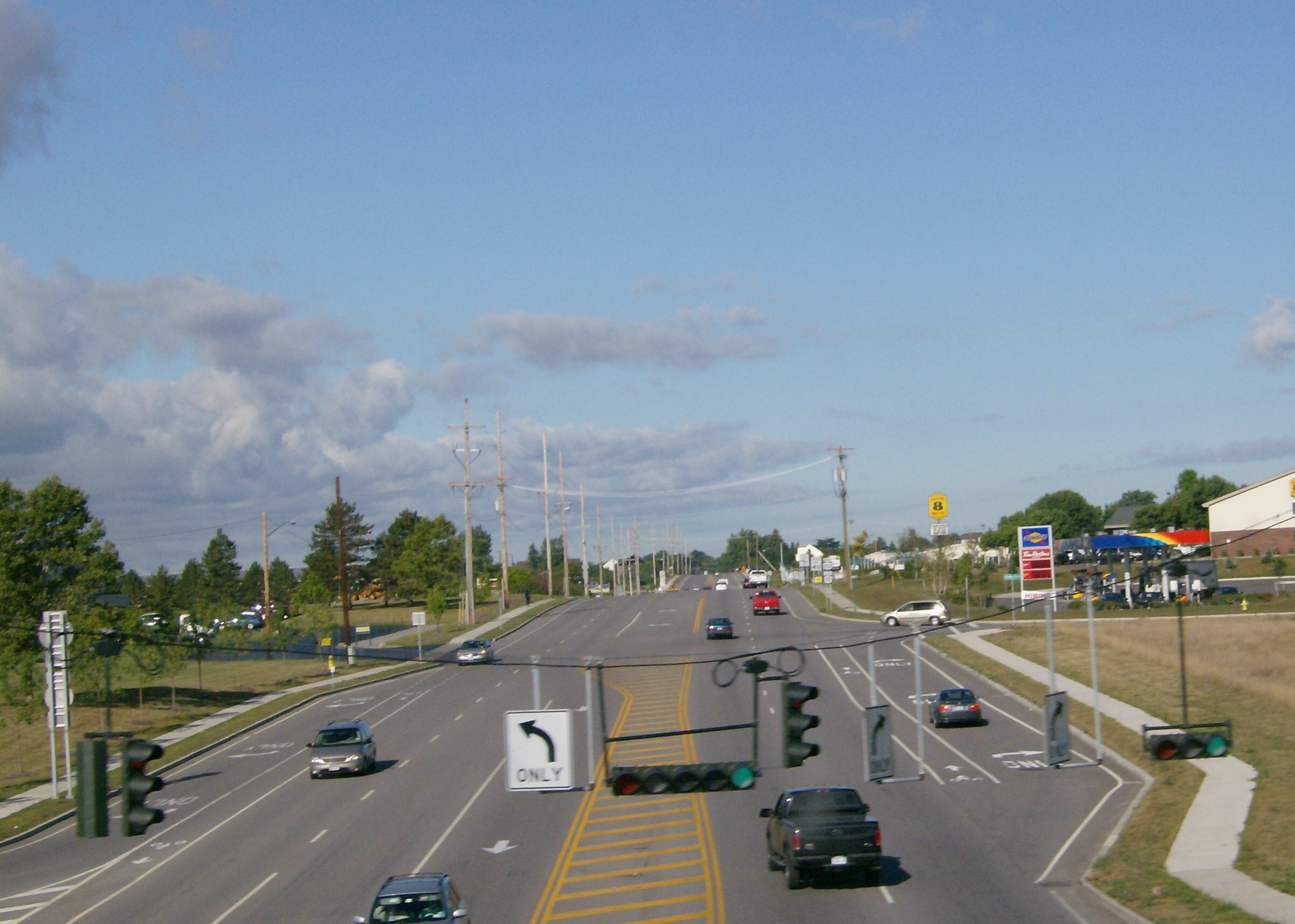
NY 253 westbound as seen from the I-390 southbound overpass in Henrietta

NY 253 begins at an intersection with NY 383 in the village Scottsville. It heads east out of the village and into the surrounding town of Wheatland as Scottsville–West Henrietta Road. Just after crossing the Genesee River into the town of Henrietta, NY 253 turns northward to briefly parallel the river. After about 0.25 miles (0.40 km), Scottsville–West Henrietta Road turns eastward; however, NY 253 continues northward onto Erie Station Road. The roadway gradually curves to the east, coming within 50 yards (46 m) of the New York State Thruway (I-90) and serving the highway's Scottsville service area. NY 253 and the Thruway follow parallel routings for 0.5 miles (0.8 km) before NY 253 shifts slightly south to intersect East River Road, a highway connecting the village of Avon to the city of Rochester.

East of River Road, NY 253 crosses the Livonia, Avon and Lakeville Railroad (LAL) and continues to parallel the Thruway through a lightly populated area of Henrietta toward the hamlet of West Henrietta. Instead of entering the hamlet, NY 253 leaves Erie Station Road and follows an industrial parkway named Thruway Park Drive around the northwestern edge of the community. Upon reaching the eastern end of Thruway Park Drive at NY 15, NY 253 turns north, joining NY 15 on West Henrietta Road and crossing over the Thruway.

NY 15 and NY 253 continue northward along the heavily-developed and entirely commercial West Henrietta Road to Lehigh Station Road, where NY 253 splits from NY 15 and follows Lehigh Station Road eastward. Like West Henrietta Road before it, Lehigh Station Road is a major commercial strip, consisting of hotels, restaurants, and other establishments. This trend begins to cease as NY 253 meets I-390 (and indirectly with the Thruway) at an interchange, and ceases entirely at a junction with Middle Road, a largely alternate route to I-390 between NY 251 in Rush and Calkins Road. Past Middle Road, NY 253 enters a predominantly residential neighborhood. It crosses a spur of the LAL that serves a pair of businesses on NY 253 and continues to the official town center of Henrietta, where it intersects NY 15A. NY 253 continues onward, meeting Pinnacle Road, a highway leading from NY 251 to NY 252, 1 mile (1.6 km) east of NY 15A. East of Pinnacle Road, the amount of development along NY 253 declines sharply, and it continues eastward through open fields to its eastern terminus at NY 65 about 1 mile (1.6 km) east of the Henrietta–Pittsford town line.

== History ==
=== Establishment and early routing ===
NY 253 was assigned as part of the 1930 renumbering of state highways in New York. It initially began at NY 36 in the hamlet of Mumford and followed Scottsville–Mumford Road to the village of Scottsville. NY 253 had overlaps with NY 251 and NY 35 through Scottsville, then continued east on Scottsville–West Henrietta, East River, and Erie Station roads to the Henrietta hamlet of West Henrietta. Here, it turned north to follow NY 2 (now NY 15) to Lehigh Station Road, which it followed eastward to its end at NY 65 in the town of Pittsford. NY 253 continued on, however, joining NY 65 northward to Calkins Road. It then followed Calkins and Mendon Center Roads to NY 64 south of the village of Pittsford.

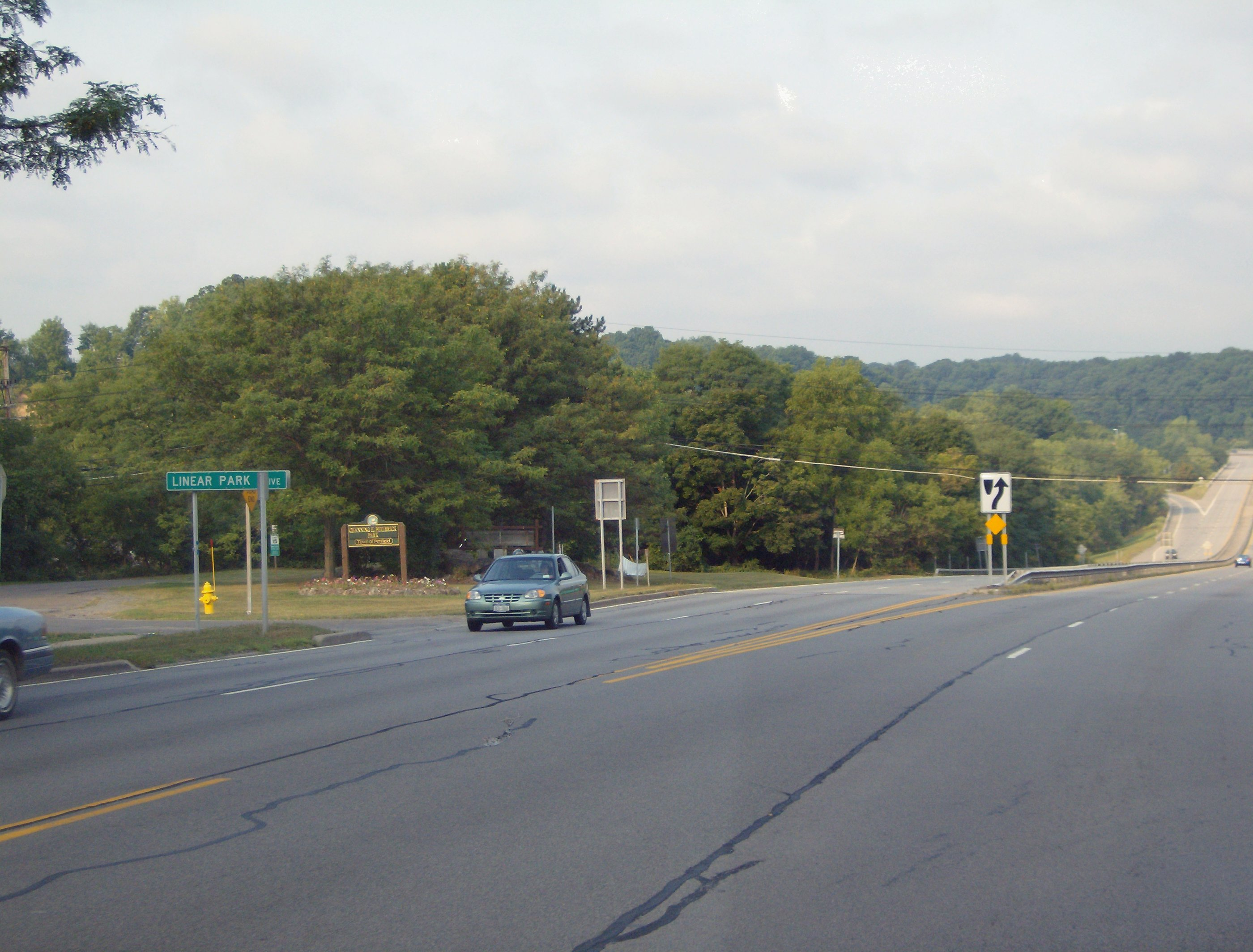
The junction of NY 441 and Linear Park Drive was the eastern terminus of NY 253 from the late 1930s to the 1960s.

NY 253 was extended northward through Pittsford and East Rochester by 1936 along NY 64, NY 15 (now NY 96), and Washington Street to a new terminus at NY 33 (modern NY 441) in Penfield. NY 35 was rerouted south of Scottsville c. 1938 to follow the routing of NY 253 to Mumford. As a result, NY 253 was truncated to the northern terminus of its overlap with NY 35 (modern NY 383) north of the village center.

=== Penfield realignments and truncation ===
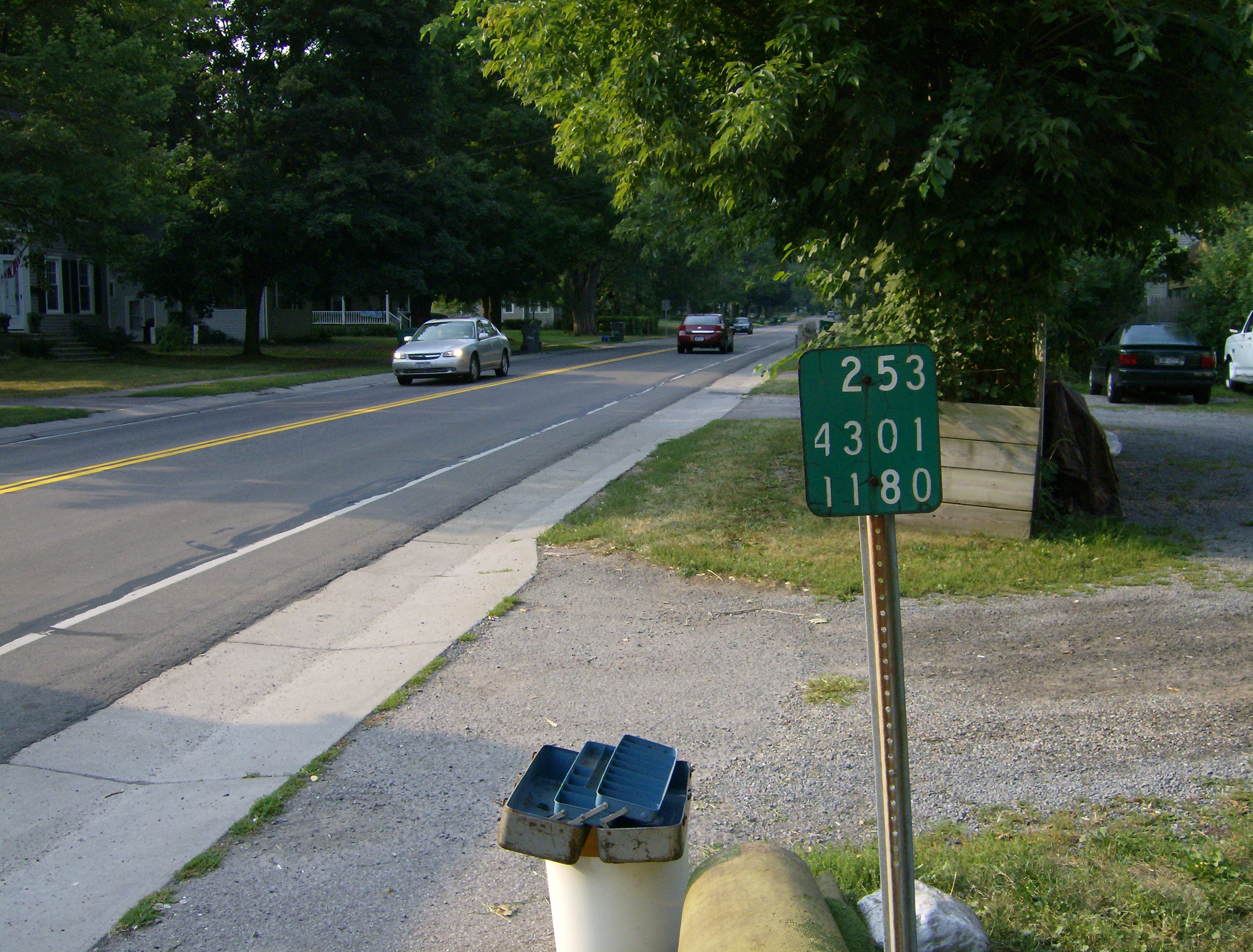
Reference marker for NY 253 on Five Mile Line Road, a remnant of its former routing in Penfield

The bridge carrying NY 253 over Irondequoit Creek in Penfield's Linear Park was closed to vehicular traffic in the 1960s. The portion of North Washington Street north of the creek, now severed from the rest of the route, was renamed Linear Park Drive. NY 253, meanwhile, was rerouted north of the junction of North Washington Street and Linden Avenue to follow Linden Avenue eastward across Irondequoit Creek to Whitney Road in Perinton. It then turned north to follow Whitney and Five Mile Line Roads to the Four Corners of Penfield, where it ended at NY 441.

An extension of Panorama Trail, named Panorama Trail South, was built from Panorama Creek Drive south to North Washington Street in the late 1960s and early 1970s to connect Washington to the new NY 441 limited-access highway being constructed through the towns of Brighton and Penfield. NY 253 was rerouted by 1971 to follow North Washington Street and the new highway northwest to the latter road's interchange with NY 441.

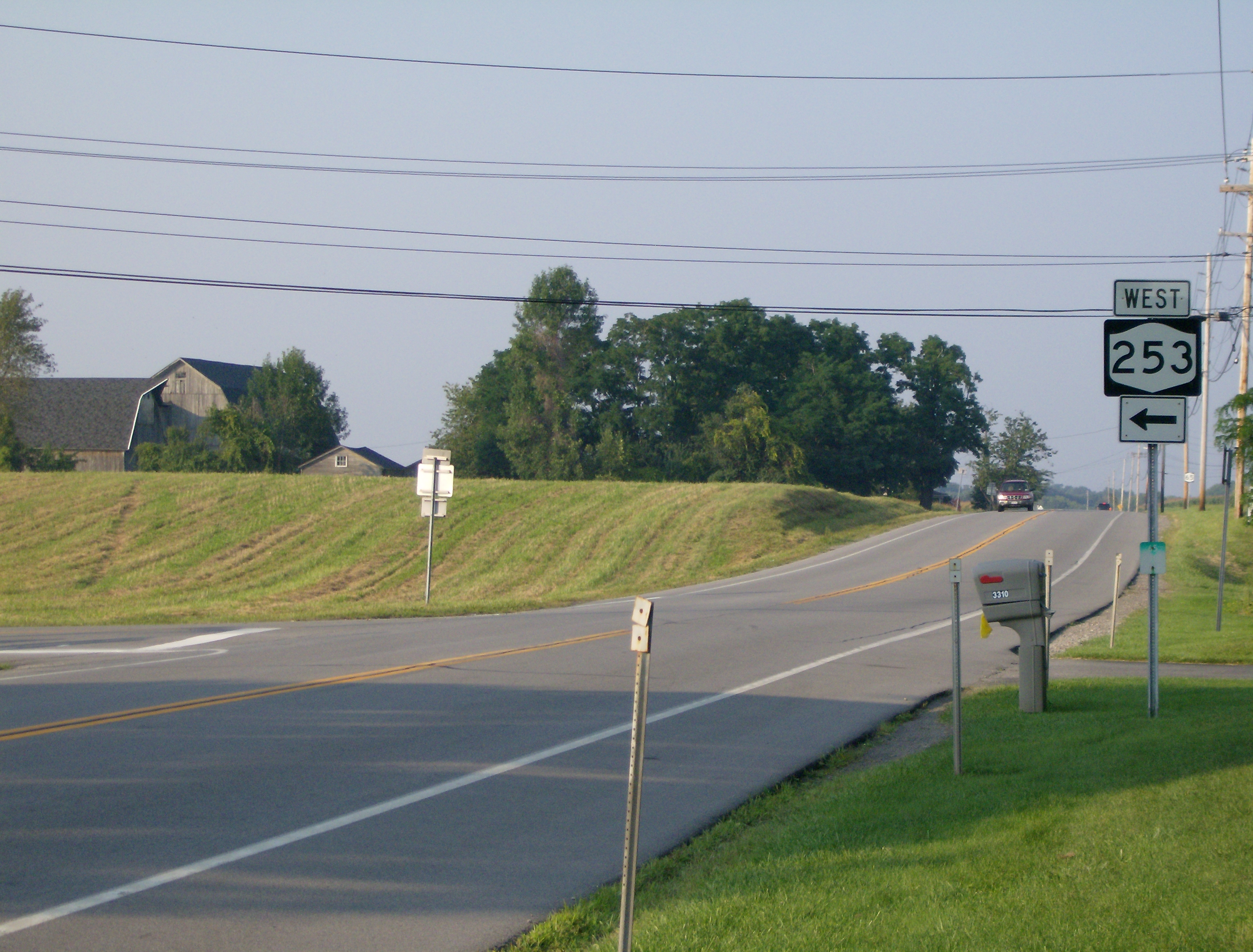
The current eastern terminus of NY 253 at NY 65 in Pittsford. This was once the southern terminus of NY 253's overlap with NY 65.

In the latter half of the 1980s, NY 253 was truncated southward to the southern terminus of its overlap with NY 65 in Pittsford. The former routing of NY 253 north of NY 96 was redesignated as NY 153 while the segment between NY 65 and NY 64 on Calkins and Mendon Center Roads became NY 943C, an unsigned reference route 1.68 miles (2.70 km) in length.

=== Henrietta realignments ===
To the southwest in Henrietta, construction began by 1978 on an extension of Erie Station Road in the vicinity of Scottsville–West Henrietta and East River Roads. The new roadway, as proposed, would begin at the junction of Erie Station and East River Roads and parallel the New York State Thruway westward toward the Genesee River, then loop back to the southeast to end at Farrell Road. Ultimately, the proposed loop to Farrell Road was scrapped in favor of a more direct connection with Scottsville–West Henrietta Road. The new highway became part of a rerouted NY 253 on April 1, 1984, when it was added to the state highway system as part of a highway maintenance swap between the state of New York and Monroe County. In the swap, ownership and maintenance of the former routing of NY 253 on Scottsville–West Henrietta Road was transferred from the state to the town of Henrietta while the East River Road portion was given to Monroe County and is now part of County Route 84 (CR 84).

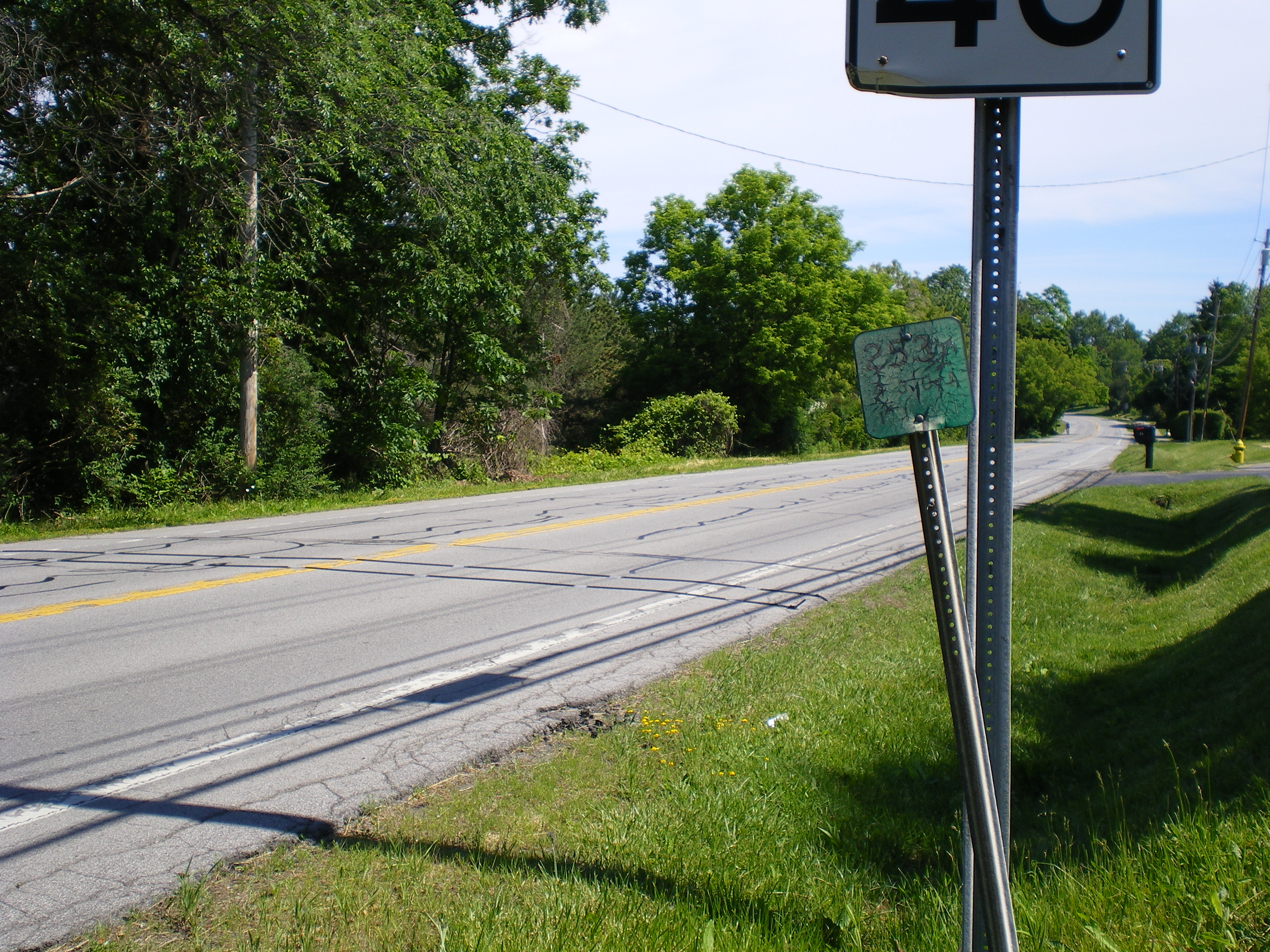
Reference marker for NY 253 on Mendon Center Road (now NY 943C) in the town of Pittsford

In the late 1990s, the amount of traffic at the intersection between NY 253 (Erie Station Road) and NY 15 (West Henrietta Road) began to increase due to the creation of the Thruway Industrial Park. Due to the presence of historical buildings at the intersection, the junction could not be widened to handle the increased traffic flow. As a result, plans were developed to construct a bypass of the intersection to the northwest. On July 29, 1999, Governor George Pataki announced that the state of New York would contribute $1 million (equivalent to $1.89 million in 2024) toward the construction of the highway, which would be an extension of Thruway Park Drive. It opened to traffic in 2000 as a realignment of NY 253. The roadway was dedicated to the town of Henrietta, and although a proposal was made that would transfer maintenance of the highway to the New York State Department of Transportation, it remains a town highway today. The 0.96-mile (1.54 km) long former routing of NY 253 on Erie Station Road became NY 943E, an unsigned reference route.

== Major intersections ==
The entire route is in Monroe County.

Location	mi	km	Destinations	Notes
Scottsville	0.00	0.00	NY 383 – Downtown Scottsville, Rochester	Western terminus
Henrietta	3.79	6.10	Erie Station Road (NY 943E east)	Former routing of NY 253
Henrietta	5.03	8.10	NY 15 south	Southern end of NY 15 concurrency
Henrietta	5.98	9.62	NY 15 north	Northern end of NY 15 concurrency
Henrietta	6.50	10.46	I-90 Toll / New York Thruway / I-390 – Rochester	Exit 46 on I-90 / Thruway; exit 12A on I-390
Henrietta	6.57	10.57	Middle Road (CR 88)	
Henrietta	7.98	12.84	NY 15A	
Henrietta	8.98	14.45	Pinnacle Road (CR 92)	
Pittsford	10.83	17.43	NY 65	Eastern terminus
1.000 mi = 1.609 km; 1.000 km = 0.621 mi: Concurrency terminus
