= New York State Route 153 (disambiguation) =

New York State Route 153 is a north–south state highway in Monroe County, New York, United States, that was established in the latter half of the 1980s.

New York State Route 153 may also refer to:

- New York State Route 153 (1932–1940s) in Rensselaer County
- New York State Route 153 (1962 – early 1980s) in Washington County
