= New York State Route 441 =

Highway in New York

New York State Route 441
- Map of the Rochester area with NY 441 highlighted in red

Route information
- Maintained by NYSDOT
- Length: 12.55 mi (20.20 km)
- Existed: January 1, 1949–present

Major junctions
- West end: NY 96 in Brighton
- I-490 in Brighton; NY 250 in Penfield
- East end: NY 350 in Walworth

Location
- Country: United States
- State: New York
- Counties: Monroe, Wayne

Highway system
- New York Highways; Interstate; US; State; Reference; Parkways
← NY 440	→ NY 442

New York State Route 441 (NY 441) is an east–west state highway in the eastern suburbs of Rochester, New York, in the United States. It extends for 12.55 miles (20.20 km) from an intersection with NY 96 in Brighton to a junction with NY 350 in Walworth. The route starts as a four-lane divided highway in Brighton and western Penfield, and gradually narrows to a two-lane undivided road as it heads away from the city of Rochester. NY 441 connects to Interstate 490 (I-490) in Brighton and intersects NY 250 in Penfield.

NY 441 was originally routed on Penfield Road between Brighton and Penfield when it was assigned in 1949. It remained on Penfield Road through Penfield and into Wayne County to Marion, where the highway ended at NY 21. The entirety of this routing had previously been part of NY 33, which was truncated westward to downtown Rochester as part of NY 441's assignment. NY 441 was cut back to NY 350 in Walworth by 1970. The divided highway that now carries NY 441 through Brighton and western Penfield was constructed during the late 1960s and opened as a realignment of NY 441 by 1971.

== Route description ==
=== West of Penfield ===
NY 441 begins at an intersection with NY 96 (East Avenue) in the Monroe County town of Brighton. This portion of NY 441 is named Linden Avenue; the road continues west of Route 96 as Elmwood Avenue. Just east of Route 96, Route 441 meets I-490 at exit 23. Past the interchange, NY 441 turns southeastward and becomes a divided highway. The portion of NY 441 from East Avenue to the Wayne County line is designated as the "Korean War Memorial Highway" by the state of New York.

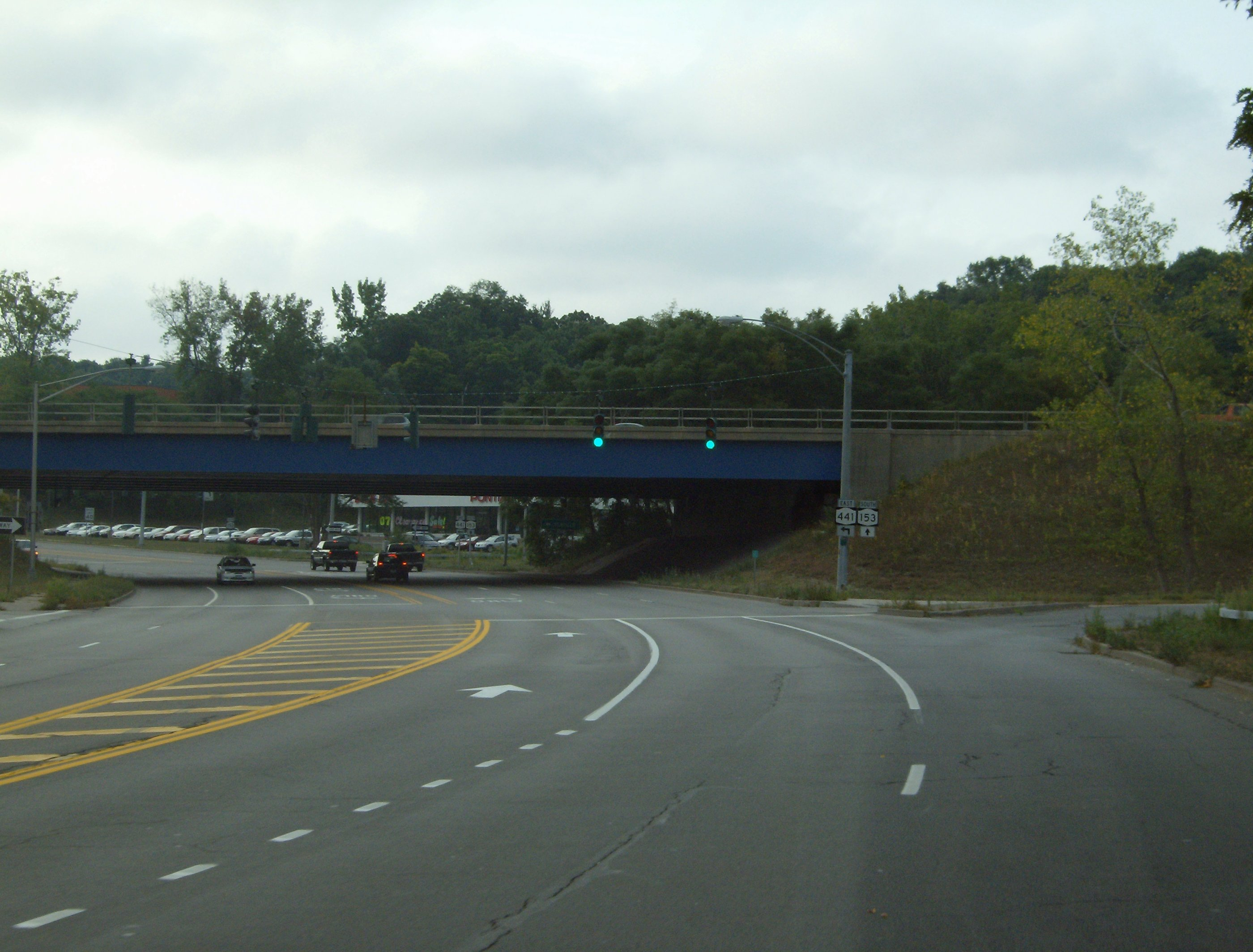
Interchange between NY 153 and NY 441 as seen from Panorama Trail southbound

Linden Avenue separates from NY 441 roughly 0.4 miles (0.6 km) from I-490 and follows a routing parallel to NY 441 on the opposite side of the nearby Rochester Subdivision, a double-tracked rail line owned by CSX Transportation. Continuing onward, Route 441 curves eastward and crosses over the CSX railroad line ahead of another intersection with Linden Avenue in the town of Pittsford. Linden Avenue crosses NY 441 and heads southeastward toward East Rochester; however, NY 441 curves northeastward to enter the town of Penfield.

Although this portion of NY 441 is surrounded by woodlands, it is actually located in a largely developed area of Penfield known locally as Panorama. The woods cease as NY 441 approaches an interchange with Panorama Trail (NY 153), the lone limited-access junction along the divided highway. East of NY 153, NY 441 crosses over Irondequoit Creek and downgrades to a four-lane undivided highway at a junction with Penfield Road. Here, Route 441 becomes Penfield Road and enters the densely populated Hamlet of Penfield.

=== Penfield and Wayne County ===
In Penfield, Route 441 passes through the commercial town center and intersects Five Mile Line Road at the Four Corners of Penfield. The junction with Five Mile Line Road was once the northern terminus of NY 253. As NY 441 heads east through the town of Penfield, the businesses are largely replaced by residences. The one exception to this is in the immediate vicinity of Lloyd's Corners—the intersection of NY 441 and NY 250—where three of the four corners of the junction are occupied by large strip malls. The level of development along NY 441 begins to decline 0.75 miles (1.21 km) east of NY 250, where the road narrows to two lanes. The surroundings become largely undeveloped by the point where NY 441 enters Wayne County.

Now in the town of Walworth, NY 441 becomes Walworth–Penfield Road. Just east of the county line, NY 441 shifts slightly northward by way of an S-curve that serves as a connector between the segmented West Walworth Road, which NY 441 intersects at both ends of the curve. This is the last curve along NY 441 as it follows a linear east–west routing over several small hills to a junction with NY 350 west of the hamlet of Walworth, where NY 441 terminates. The roadway, however, continues east to Marion as Walworth–Penfield Road, Walworth–Marion Road, and Buffalo Street, a continuous highway maintained by Wayne County as County Route 205 (CR 205) west of Hall Center Road and Maple Avenue and as CR 207 east of those roads.

== History ==
=== Origins and designation ===
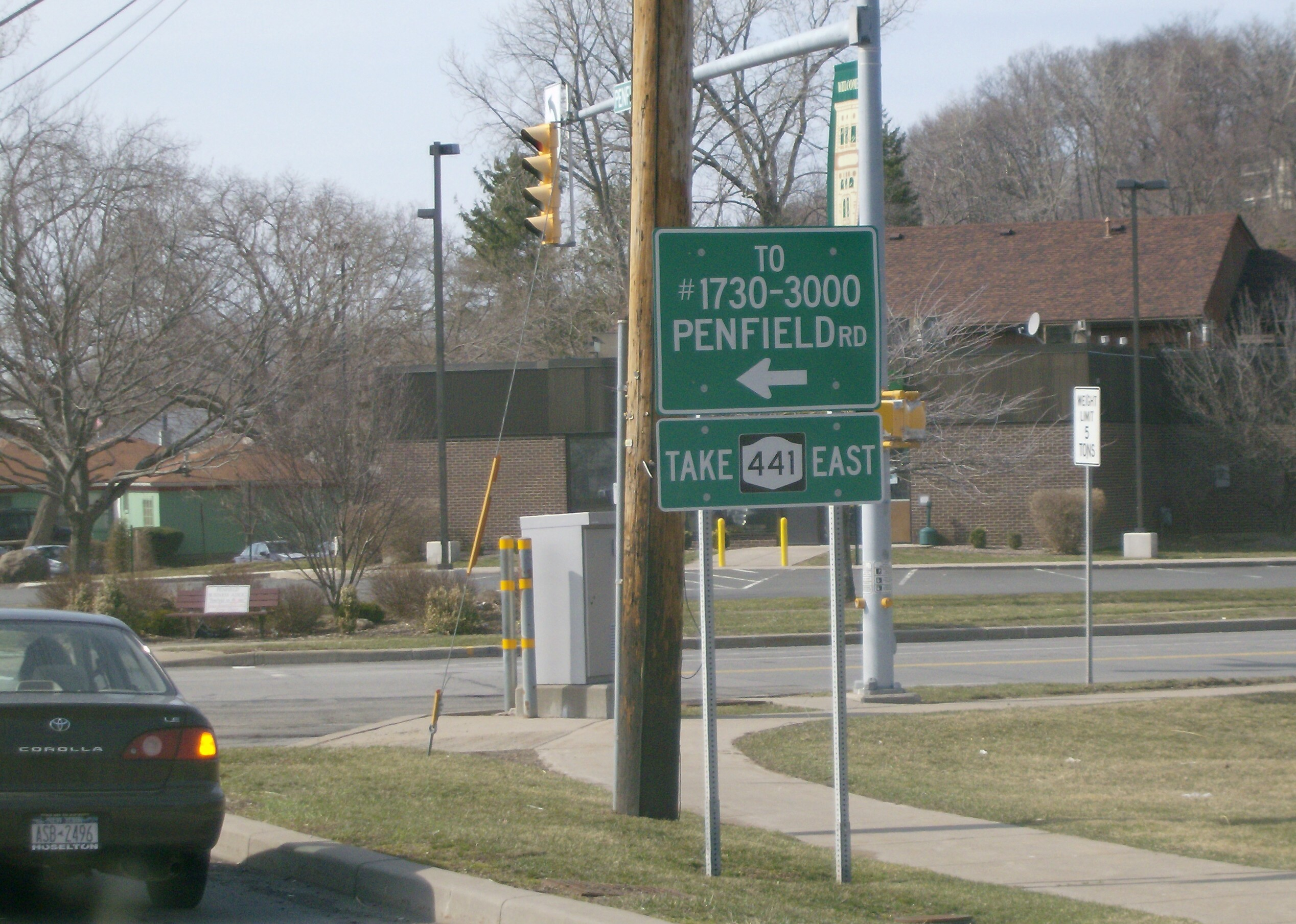
Sign on Penfield Road (former NY 441) in Panorama directing traffic bound for eastern Penfield Road (NY 441) onto Panorama Trail

The portion of NY 441 from where Penfield Road leaves NY 441 in Penfield to Walworth was originally designated as part of NY 33 in the 1930 renumbering of state highways in New York. West of the Four Corners of Penfield, NY 33 remained on Penfield Road through Penfield and Brighton to the modern intersection of Penfield Road and NY 96 (East Avenue). The route turned west to follow East Avenue into Rochester. On its eastern end, NY 33 continued on to Marion, where it ended at NY 21. NY 33 was truncated to its current eastern terminus at NY 31 in downtown Rochester on January 1, 1949. The portion of former NY 33 east of NY 96 was redesignated as NY 441.

Like NY 33 before it, NY 441 officially ended at NY 21 in Marion when it was first assigned. By 1970, the east end of the route was moved to NY 350 in Walworth. The change in NY 441's alignment had no effect on the maintenance of the Walworth–Marion highway, however, as the Wayne County portion of NY 441 was entirely county-maintained. On April 1, 1980, ownership and maintenance of NY 441 from the Monroe County line to NY 350 was transferred from Wayne County to the state of New York as part of a highway maintenance swap between the two levels of government. In return, the county received a part of NY 21 in Williamson that connected to a state highway at only one end.

=== Brighton–Penfield divided highway ===
Construction on a new divided highway through the towns of Brighton and Penfield began in the late 1960s and was completed by 1971, at which time it became a realignment of NY 441. At the western end, NY 441 was routed onto the pre-existing Linden Avenue to connect to NY 96 at a junction southeast of its original western terminus. While most of Linden Avenue was transferred to the state, the westernmost section from NY 96 to I-490 was maintained by Monroe County as part of CR 15. The 2.46-mile (3.96 km) portion of NY 441's former routing on Penfield Road from NY 96 to Panorama Trail was transferred to Monroe County and designated CR 269. The Route 441 reconstruction project, initiated in 1999, aimed to improve traffic flow and safety at the interchange with I-490 in Rochester, New York. The project involved rebuilding the interchange with a diamond design, replacing outdated infrastructure, and accommodating increased traffic. Despite challenges like underground soil issues, the project was completed by late 2000, with the federal government covering 90% of the $13.9 million cost. The upgraded interchange was designed to handle approximately 120,000 vehicles daily, enhancing connectivity and easing congestion.

In 2007, ownership and maintenance of the county-maintained portion of NY 441 near its west end was transferred to the state of New York as part of a highway maintenance swap between the state and Monroe County. A bill (S4856, 2007) to enact the swap was introduced in the New York State Senate on April 23 and passed by both the Senate and the New York State Assembly on June 20. The act was signed into law by Governor Eliot Spitzer on August 28. Under the terms of the act, it took effect 90 days after it was signed into law; thus, the maintenance swap officially took place on November 26, 2007. The entirety of NY 441 is now maintained by the New York State Department of Transportation.

=== NY 441 & NY 250 Intersection Project ===
In the spring of 2000, construction began on a major improvement project at the intersection of NY 441 and NY 250 in Penfield. The project involved widening the stretch of NY 441 between NY 250 and Watson Road, installing a raised median, and implementing other safety enhancements to improve traffic flow and reduce congestion. The work was completed by the fall of 2001, ahead of schedule, after the contractor was awarded a $90,000 incentive for early completion. In addition to addressing safety concerns at the intersection, the project was motivated by the growing development in the area, including the construction of the Parkside Commons strip mall, a new Target store, and the Willow Pond development west of it. These developments were expected to increase traffic and necessitated improvements to the surrounding infrastructure.

== Major intersections ==
County	Location	mi	km	Destinations	Notes
Monroe	Brighton	0.00	0.00	NY 96 (East Avenue)	Western terminus
Monroe	Brighton	0.20	0.32	I-490	Exit 23 (I-490)
Monroe	Penfield	2.01	3.23	NY 153 south (Panorama Trail)	Diamond interchange; northern terminus of NY 153
Monroe	Penfield	2.96	4.76	Five Mile Line Road	Hamlet of Four Corners; former northern terminus of NY 253
Monroe	Penfield	4.74	7.63	NY 250 (Fairport–Nine Mile Point Road) – Webster, Fairport	Hamlet of Lloyd's Corners
Wayne	Walworth	12.55	20.20	NY 350 – Ontario	Eastern terminus
1.000 mi = 1.609 km; 1.000 km = 0.621 mi

== See also ==
- List of county routes in Monroe County, New York
