= United States Post Office (East Rochester, New York) =

- US Post Office-East Rochester
- U.S. National Register of Historic Places
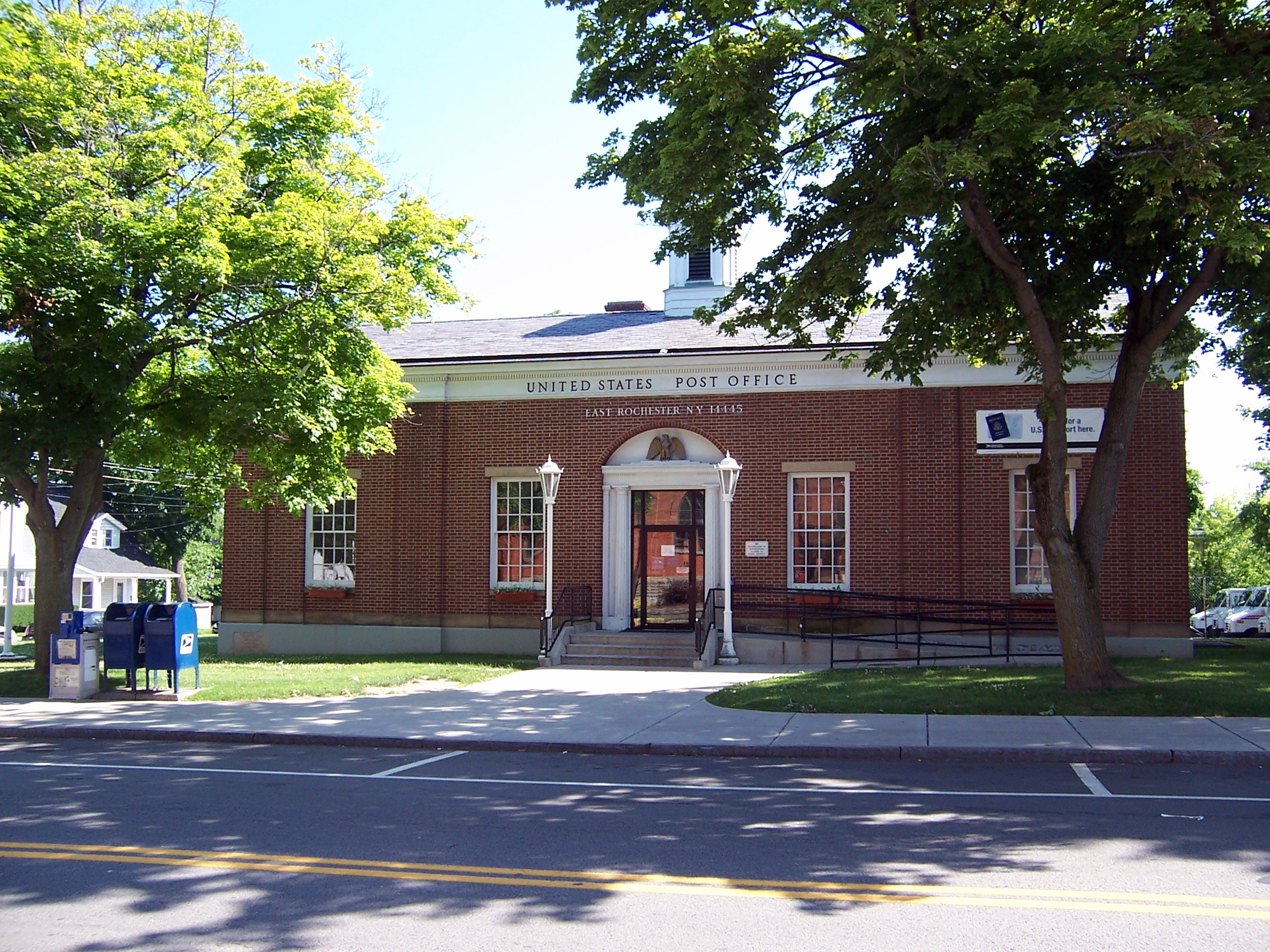
- Officer Daryl R. Pierson Memorial Post Office Building, June 2009

- Location within New York Location within the United States
- Interactive map showing the location for U.S. Post Office-East Rochester
- Location: 206 W. Commercial St., East Rochester, New York
- Coordinates: 43°6′49″N 77°29′19″W
- Area: less than one acre
- Built: 1936
- Architect: Simon, Louis A.
- Architectural style: Colonial Revival
- MPS: US Post Offices in New York State, 1858-1943, TR
- NRHP reference No.: 88002495
- Added to NRHP: November 17, 1988

The Officer Daryl R. Pierson Memorial Post Office Building is a historic post office building located at East Rochester in Monroe County, New York. It was designed and built 1936–1937, and is one of a number of post offices in New York State designed by the Office of the Supervising Architect of the Treasury Department, Louis A. Simon. The one story brick building is in the Colonial Revival style and has a roof crowned by a flat topped cupola. The entrance features fluted Doric columns and a blind fanlight with sculpted eagle. The interior features a mural titled "Recreation Hours" by Bernard Gussow.

It was listed on the National Register of Historic Places in 1988. In 2015, the post office was named for Daryl Pierson, an East Rochester native and Rochester police officer who was killed in the line of duty the previous year; the building was officially dedicated on June 4, 2016.
