= New York State Route 153 =

State highway in Monroe County, New York, US

New York State Route 153
- Map of the Rochester area with NY 153 highlighted in red

Route information
- Maintained by NYSDOT
- Length: 3.03 mi (4.88 km)
- Existed: 1980s–present

Major junctions
- South end: NY 96 in Pittsford
- North end: NY 441 in Penfield

Location
- Country: United States
- State: New York
- Counties: Monroe

Highway system
- New York Highways; Interstate; US; State; Reference; Parkways
← NY 152	→ NY 154

New York State Route 153 (NY 153) is a 3.03-mile (4.88 km) long north–south state highway located in the eastern suburbs of Rochester, New York, in the United States. The southern terminus of the route is at NY 96 in the village of Pittsford. Its northern terminus is at an interchange with NY 441 in the town of Penfield. Over the course of its routing, NY 153 passes through the towns of Pittsford, East Rochester (also village), Perinton, and Penfield. NY 153 connects to Interstate 490 (I-490) twice in East Rochester by way of NY 31F and West Commercial Street.

All of NY 153 in Pittsford and East Rochester was originally designated as part of NY 253 in the 1930s. From the 1930s to the 1960s, NY 253 followed North Washington Street north to NY 441 in Penfield. In the 1960s, the bridge carrying NY 253 over Irondequoit Creek was closed, and NY 253 was rerouted to use Linden Avenue and Whitney Road instead. The route was realigned again by 1971 to follow the new Panorama Trail South to an interchange with NY 441. NY 253 was truncated south to Pittsford town at some point in the latter half of the 1980s, at which time its former routing from Pittsford village to Penfield was assigned the NY 153 designation.

== Route description ==
NY 153 begins at an intersection with NY 96 in the village of Pittsford, located in the town of the same name north of Pittsford's commercial district. The route travels east for a short distance as Washington Road before curving to the northeast, ascending slightly in altitude as it progresses onward. After clearing a small hill, NY 153 meets Golf Avenue. North of the Golf Avenue junction, NY 153 leaves the village as it travels up another hill before leveling off ahead of Interstate 490, which it crosses by way of an overpass rebuilt in 1994.

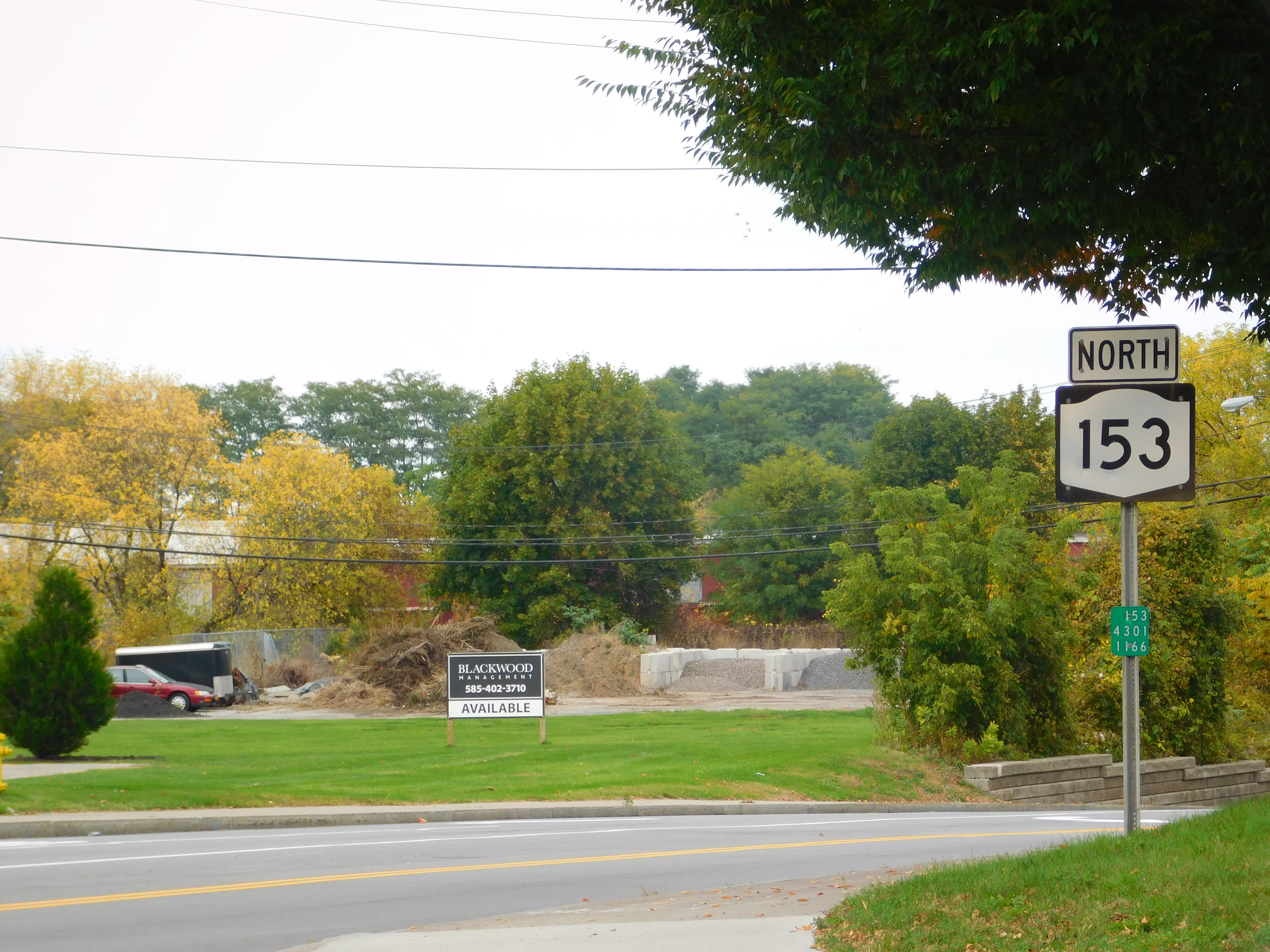
NY 153 in East Rochester.

The route continues through the residential town to an intersection with NY 31F (Fairport Road) located on the boundary between the town of Pittsford and the town and village of East Rochester. Upon crossing NY 31F, and thus the town line, NY 153 becomes South Washington Street. The route acts as the main thoroughfare through the town, carrying approximately 10,000 vehicles per day between NY 31F and West Commercial Street (unsigned NY 940U). At West Commercial Street, commuters destined for I-490 are instructed to turn left to gain access via exit 24, located at the west end of Commercial Street.

A short distance north of Commercial Street, NY 153 passes under the Rochester Subdivision, a double-tracked railroad line owned by CSX Transportation. On the opposite side of the underpass, NY 153 becomes North Washington Street and intersects Despatch Drive, a local arterial serving a line of warehouses along the railroad tracks. NY 153 continues on, widening from two to four lanes as it passes through a commercial and industrial neighborhood of East Rochester. Two blocks north of Despatch Drive, the route meets Linden Avenue, an east–west roadway linking NY 441 in Penfield to Whitney Road in Perinton.

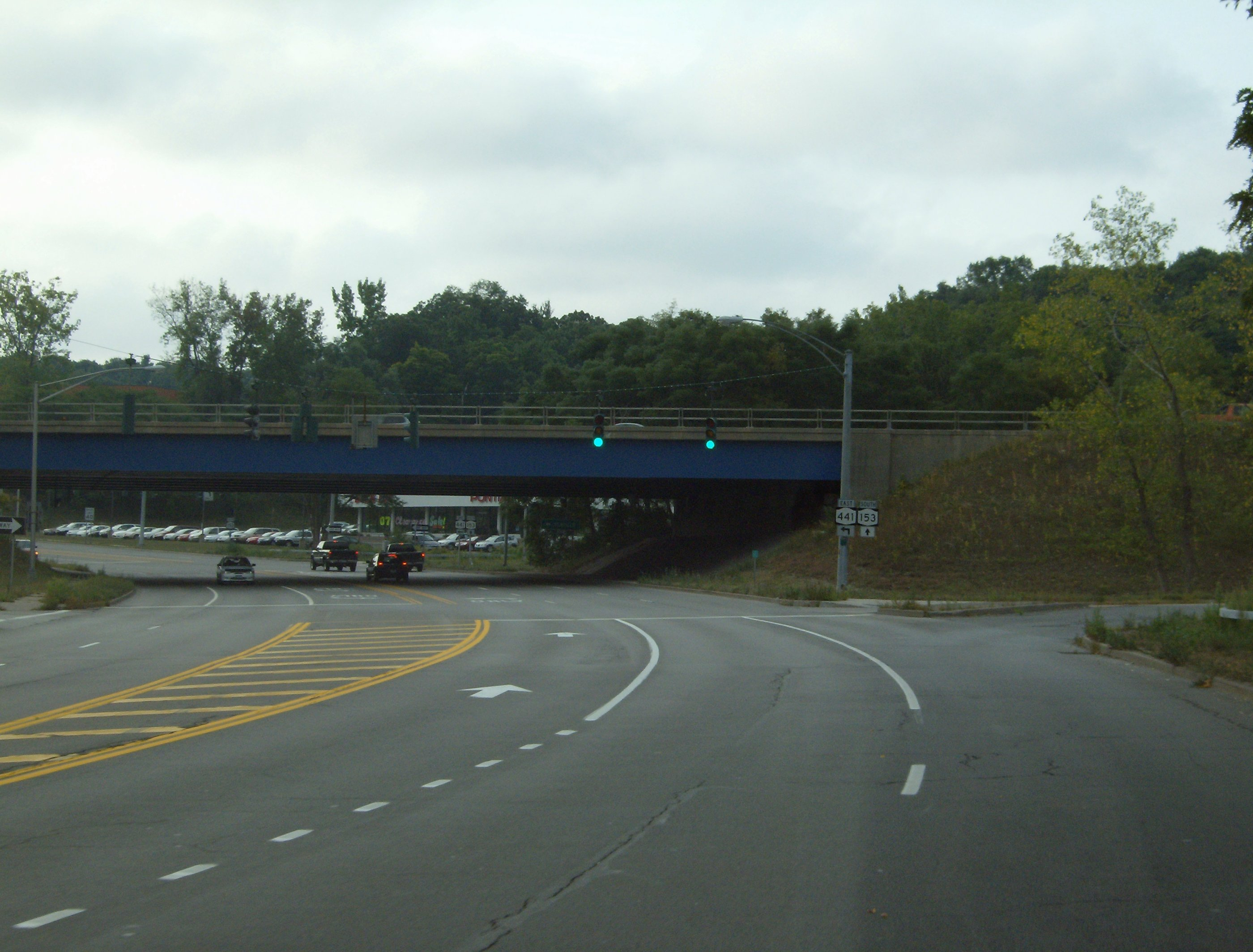
Interchange between NY 153 and NY 441 as seen from Panorama Trail southbound

Past Linden, NY 153 exits East Rochester and enters Perinton, although no signs are present indicating the Perinton town line. Roughly 0.3 miles (0.5 km) ahead, the route breaks from its northeast alignment and takes a northwesterly routing towards Penfield. In the center of the 90-degree turn, North Washington Street leaves NY 153 to continue north toward Penfield's Linear Park. NY 153 becomes Panorama Trail South and continues into the town of Penfield. Just inside the town line, the route descends into the Panorama Valley, dropping a total of 100 feet (30 m) over 0.75 miles (1.21 km). As it heads down the hill, NY 153 serves several commercial establishments, including the headquarters of Paychex. Now in the base of valley, the route intersects NY 441 by way of a diamond interchange. NY 153 terminates at the westbound access ramps to NY 441 and the roadway continues northward as the unsigned County Route 270 (CR 270).

== History ==
The portion of Washington Road and Washington Street from North Main Street in the village of Pittsford to the modern junction of Panorama Trail and North Washington Street north of East Rochester was initially constructed prior to 1900. North Washington Street continued northeast into the town of Penfield, where it ended at Penfield Road west of the hamlet of Penfield. On November 12, 1908, the state of New York awarded a contract calling for the improvement of Washington Road between the Pittsford village line and Fairport Road. The 0.99-mile (1.59 km) long section of highway was accepted into the state highway system on August 15, 1909. The state let a contract to improve the section of Washington Street from Fairport Road to Penfield Road on November 4, 1915; it was added to the state highway system on January 9, 1917.

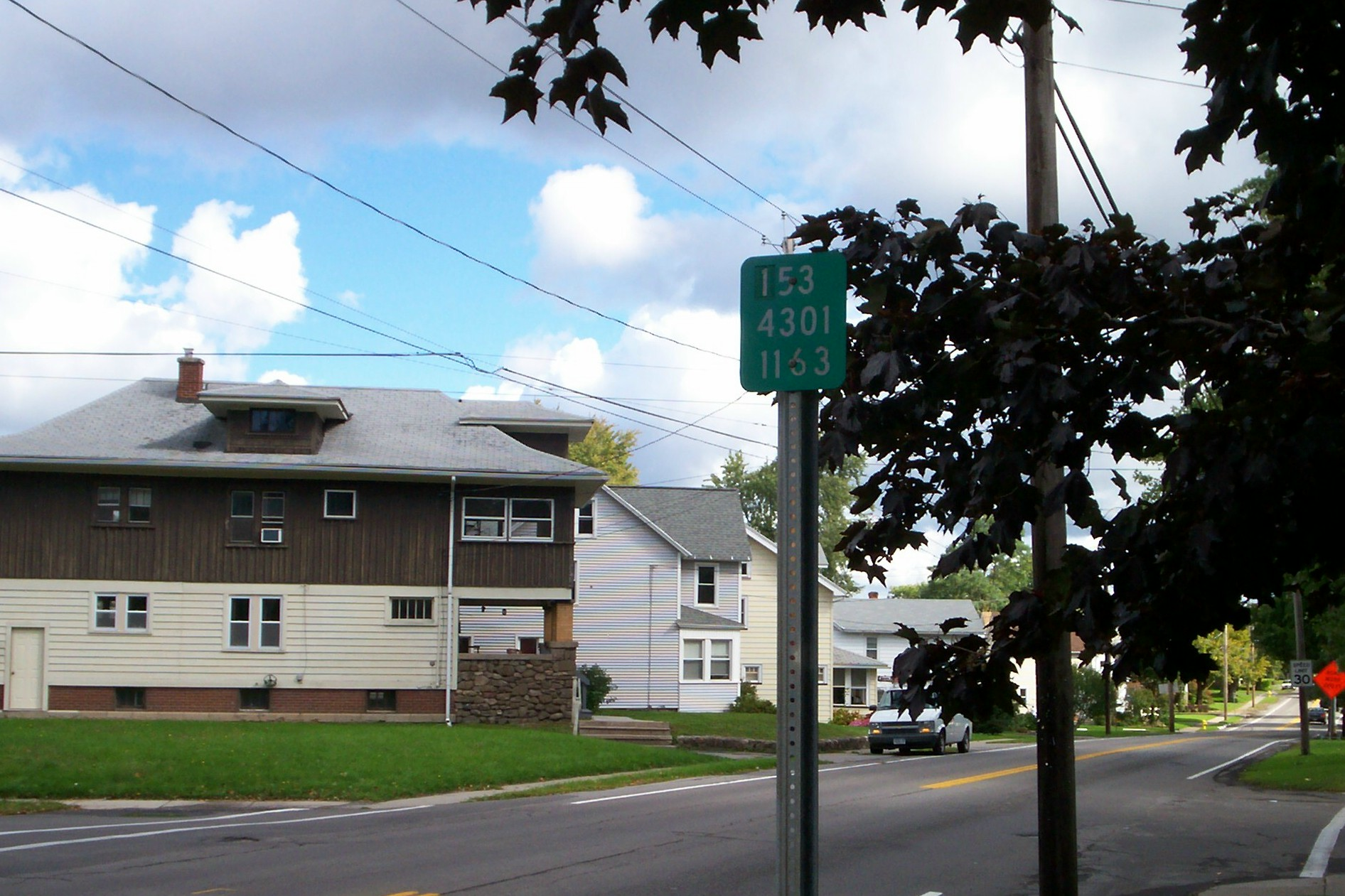
2006 photo of one of many ex-NY 253 reference markers in East Rochester that had been patched to read "153".

When NY 253 was assigned as part of the 1930 renumbering of state highways in New York, it ended at NY 64 south of Pittsford. NY 253 was extended northward through Pittsford to Penfield along the Pittsford–East Rochester–Penfield state highway by 1936. The bridge carrying NY 253 over Irondequoit Creek in Penfield was closed to vehicular traffic in the 1960s; as a result, NY 253 was rerouted north of the junction of North Washington Street and Linden Avenue to follow Linden Avenue eastward across Irondequoit Creek to Whitney Road in Perinton.

Construction on a new divided highway for NY 441 began in the late 1960s. As part of the construction, a four-lane extension of Panorama Trail was built to connect Panorama Creek Drive and North Washington Street to the new expressway. The new highway was completed by 1971 and named Panorama Trail South. The segment of Panorama Trail South from North Washington Street to the NY 441 interchange became part of a realigned NY 253; north of the interchange, Panorama Trail South was initially designated as NY 942B, an unsigned reference route.

NY 253 was truncated southward at some point in the latter half of the 1980s to end at NY 65 in the town of Pittsford. The portion of NY 253's former routing from NY 96 (North Main Street) in Pittsford to NY 441 in Penfield was redesignated as NY 153. For many years, signs along NY 153 were holdovers from the NY 253 designation, as evidenced by covered numbers on multiple shields and reference markers along the highway.

In 2007, ownership and maintenance of NY 942B was transferred from the state of New York to Monroe County as part of a highway maintenance swap between the two levels of government. A bill (S4856, 2007) to enact the swap was introduced in the New York State Senate on April 23 and passed by both the Senate and the New York State Assembly on June 20. The act was signed into law by Governor Eliot Spitzer on August 28. Under the terms of the act, it took effect 90 days after it was signed into law; thus, the maintenance swap officially took place on November 26, 2007. The former routing of NY 942B is now part of CR 270, a 0.40-mile (0.64 km) route that continues northeast on Panorama Trail to Penfield Road.

=== Rehabilitation and reconstruction ===
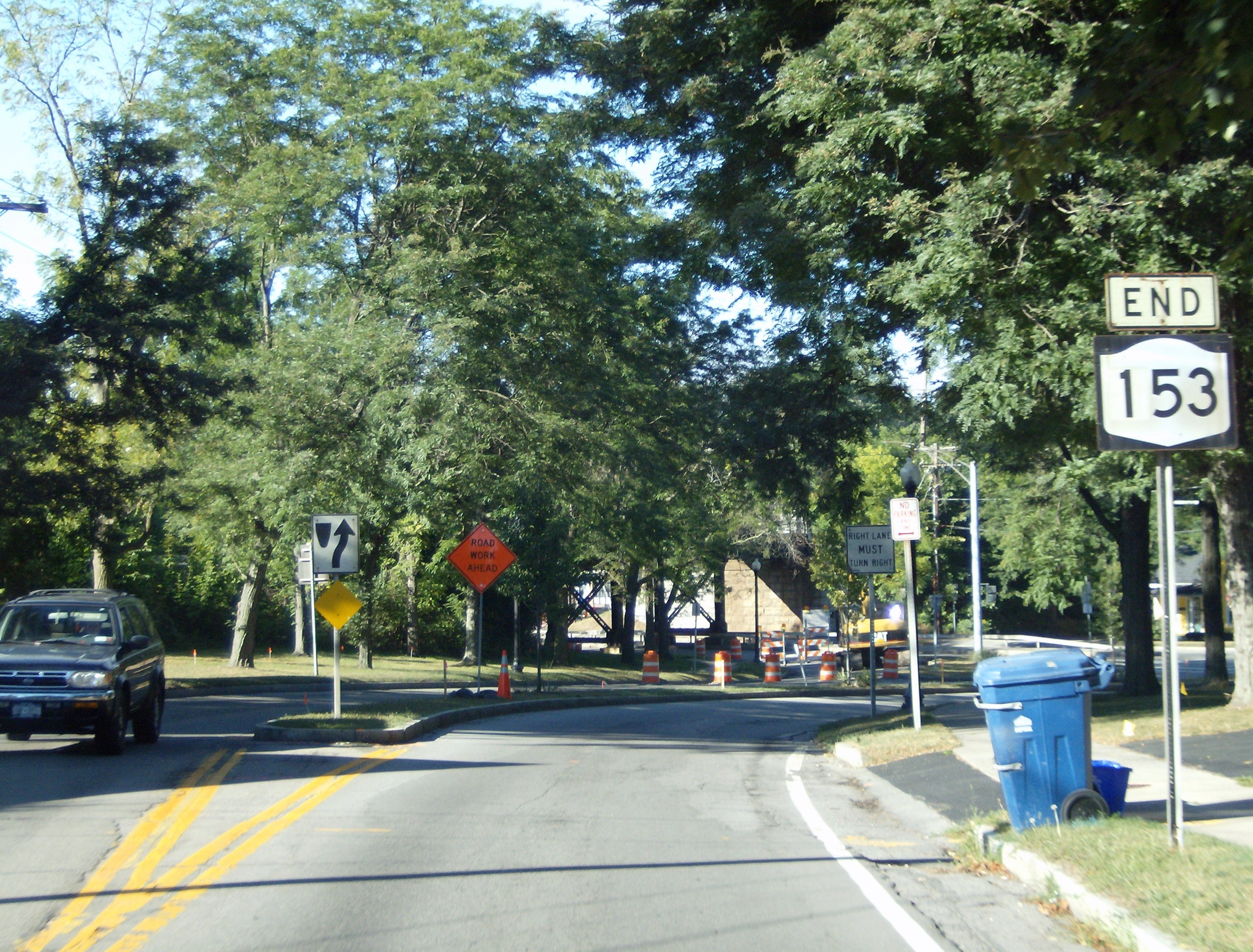
Southern terminus of NY 153 in Pittsford as it looked in 2007. The slip ramp in the background is closed and awaiting deconstruction.

The portion of NY 153 south of West Commercial Street in East Rochester had not been substantially reconstructed since 1915. In mid-August 2007, construction began on a two-year, $3.2 million project to resurface and reconstruct NY 153 from NY 96 north to West Commercial Street. The project was divided into two sections, with NY 31F (Fairport Road) acting as the divider. Work on the first section from NY 96 to NY 31F involved the resurfacing of the road and the elimination of the slip ramp between NY 96 north and NY 153 north through the reconfiguration of the NY 96 / NY 153 intersection. Both were completed by late 2007.

The second section of NY 153 from NY 31F to Commercial Street was entirely rebuilt. As part of the project, new sidewalks, curbing, and drainage systems were constructed along the roadway. During the course of construction, only one direction of traffic was allowed on the road. NY 153 northbound was closed first; travelers heading north were instructed to follow NY 31F, Lincoln Road and Linden Avenue to traverse the village. Construction paused in November 2007 for the winter months, at which time the highway was reopened to two-way traffic. On March 31, 2008, NY 153 northbound was closed again and the detour was reinstated; however, the detour now utilized NY 31F, the service roads of I-490 between exits 24 and 25, and West Commercial Street instead. From May 26 to June 28, both directions of NY 153 between NY 31F and Commercial Street were closed to traffic to allow for a larger scale of construction. The project was completed in October 2008.

== Major intersections ==
The entire route is in Monroe County.

Location	mi	km	Destinations	Notes
Village of Pittsford	0.00	0.00	NY 96 (North Main Street)	Southern terminus
Pittsford–East Rochester line	1.14	1.83	NY 31F (Fairport Road)	
East Rochester	1.80	2.90	NY 940U (West Commercial Street) to I-490	Eastern terminus of unsigned NY 940U
Penfield	3.03	4.88	NY 441 – Penfield	Northern terminus
1.000 mi = 1.609 km; 1.000 km = 0.621 mi

== See also ==
- List of county routes in Monroe County, New York
