= New York State Route 250 =

State highway in Monroe County, New York, US

New York State Route 250
- Map of the Rochester area with NY 250 highlighted in red

Route information
- Maintained by NYSDOT and the village of Fairport
- Length: 16.01 mi (25.77 km)
- Existed: 1930–present

Major junctions
- South end: NY 96 in Perinton
- NY 31F in Fairport; NY 104 in Webster village
- North end: Lake Road in Webster town

Location
- Country: United States
- State: New York
- Counties: Monroe

Highway system
- New York Highways; Interstate; US; State; Reference; Parkways
| ← NY 249 | → NY 251 |

New York State Route 250 (NY 250) is a north–south state highway in the eastern portion of Monroe County, New York, in the United States. It extends for just over 16 miles (26 km) from an intersection with NY 96 in the town of Perinton to a junction with Lake Road (former NY 18) near the Lake Ontario shoreline in the town of Webster. NY 250 passes through the villages of Fairport and Webster, where it meets NY 31F and NY 104 (former US Route 104), respectively. The highway is the easternmost north–south state route in Monroe County.

Most of the highway was taken over by the state of New York in the 1910s and 1920s. In 1908, the section of modern NY 250 in Fairport between Church and High Streets became part of Route 20, an unsigned legislative route assigned by the New York State Legislature. The definition of the route was altered in 1921, taking the route on a more southerly course that used the portion of what is now NY 250 between NY 31 and NY 31F instead through eastern Monroe County. NY 250 was assigned to its current alignment as part of the 1930 renumbering of state highways in New York.

== Route description ==
NY 250, the easternmost north–south state route in Monroe County, begins at an intersection with NY 96 a short distance northwest of Eastview Mall in the town of Perinton. The two-lane route heads to the northeast as Moseley Road, a name it retains for the next 4 miles (6 km). It initially heads uphill through a forested area; however, at Garnsey Road, it turns northward and begins to slowly descend into a part of town dominated by housing tracts. The residential surroundings end 1 mile (1.6 km) north of Garnsey Road, where NY 250 meets NY 31 in a large commercial district that plays home to Perinton Square Mall, a shopping mall located just northeast of the junction. Past the junction, the route reenters a residential area and temporarily curves to the east to bypass a hill overlooking Ayrault Road. NY 250 returns to its due north routing at Ayrault Road and continues into the village of Fairport, where it changes names from Moseley Road to South Main Street at Hulburt Road.

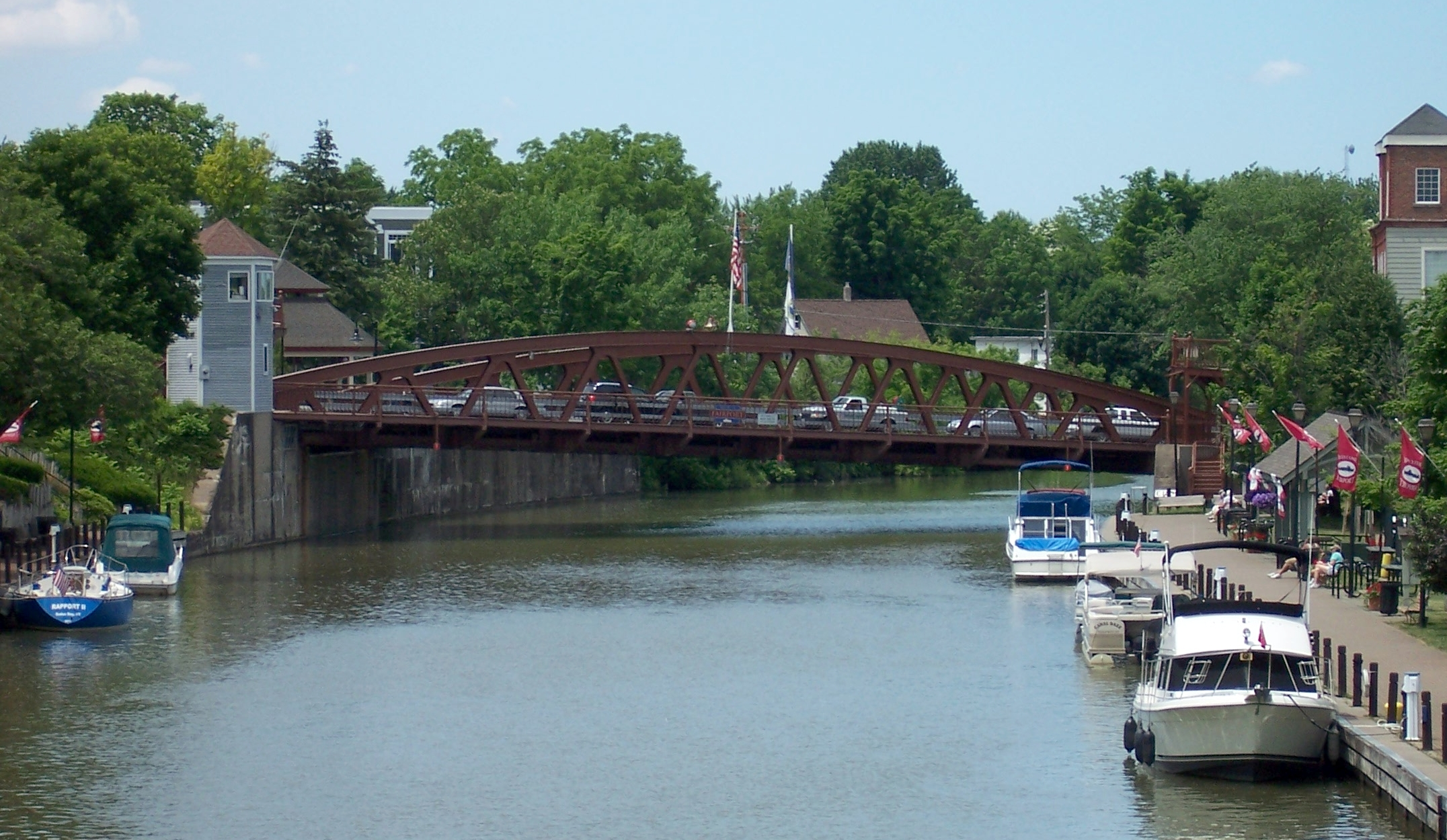
The Fairport Lift Bridge carries NY 250 over the Erie Canal

In Fairport, NY 250 follows South Main Street down a large hill that levels off at the southern edge of the village's business district. Here, NY 250 intersects Church Street (NY 31F) and passes by the First Baptist Church of Fairport, located on the northwestern corner of the junction. The route continues north into the center of the village, passing by several small businesses and Fairport Village Landing—the largest shopping plaza in the village—before crossing over the Erie Canal by way of a lift bridge and becoming North Main Street. Once on the north side of the canal, NY 250 crosses the CSX Transportation-owned Rochester and West Shore Subdivisions at a single grade crossing ahead of High Street. At this point, the businesses give way to homes as the highway ascends a hill at the north end of the village and meets Whitney Road at the northern village line.

North of Whitney Road, NY 250 becomes Fairport–Nine Mile Point Road as it descends and ascends a series of small hills populated by homes on its way into Penfield. About 0.5 miles (0.8 km) north of the town line and 1.5 miles (2.4 km) north of Fairport, the route enters Lloyd's Corners, a commercial district surrounding NY 250's junction with NY 441. The residential surroundings return north of the intersection, however, as the route approaches a junction with Whalen Road. Past this point, the homes begin to get further spaced apart as NY 250 heads northeastward into a rural area of eastern Monroe County. It remains on a northeastward course for just over 1 mile (1.6 km) before curving back to the north at a junction with NY 286 (Atlantic Avenue), its last major intersection before entering the town of Webster as Webster Road.

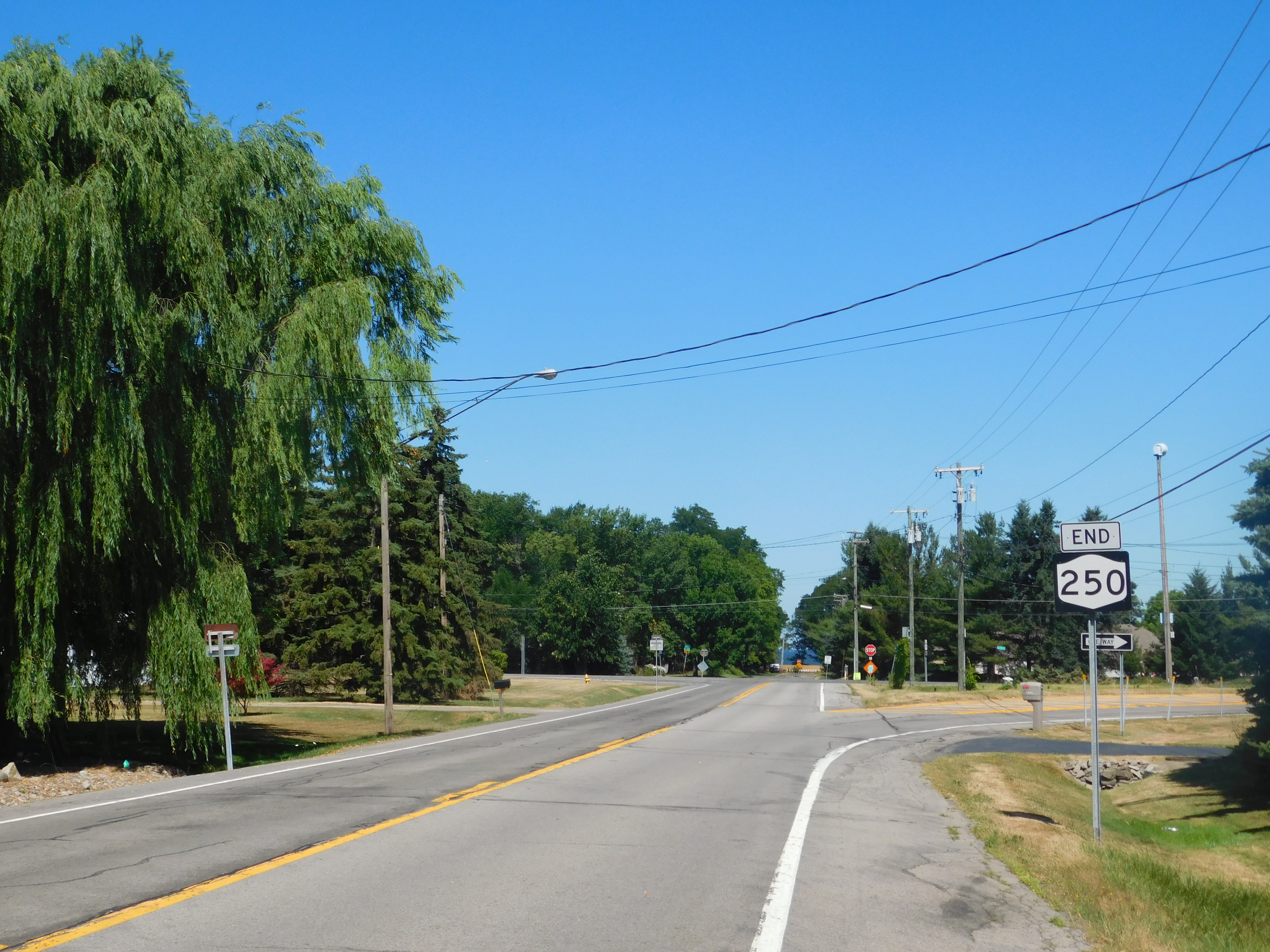
Northern terminus of NY 250 in Webster

About 0.3 miles (0.5 km) later, the highway reenters a more populated area that delimits the southern edge of the village of Webster. Now South Avenue, NY 250 heads north through the densely populated southern half of the community, passing by Spry Middle School on its way into the village center. Once again, the homes are supplanted by businesses as NY 250 and NY 404 (Main Street) meet at the heart of the business district. North of the junction, the route changes names to North Avenue and connects to the Irondequoit–Wayne County Expressway (NY 104) at an interchange just two blocks from NY 404. It continues on, crossing the Ontario Midland Railroad before leaving the village and becoming Webster Road once more. The highway heads onward through mostly residential areas of northeastern Webster to Lake Road (formerly part of NY 18), where NY 250 ends 250 yards (230 m) from the Lake Ontario shoreline at Nine Mile Point.

== History ==
=== State ownership ===
Most of what is now NY 250 was originally taken over by the state of New York during the 1910s and 1920s. Work to improve the highway to state highway standards was performed in stages, beginning in the town of Webster and gradually heading south through Fairport to Perinton. The segment north of the Penfield–Webster town line was improved at a cost of just over $103,807 (equivalent to $3.3 million in 2024) and added to the state highway system on October 24, 1913. Construction on the next section between Liftbridge Lane in Fairport and the Penfield–Webster town line cost roughly $94,140 (equivalent to $2.93 million in 2024). It was accepted into the system on January 4, 1915.

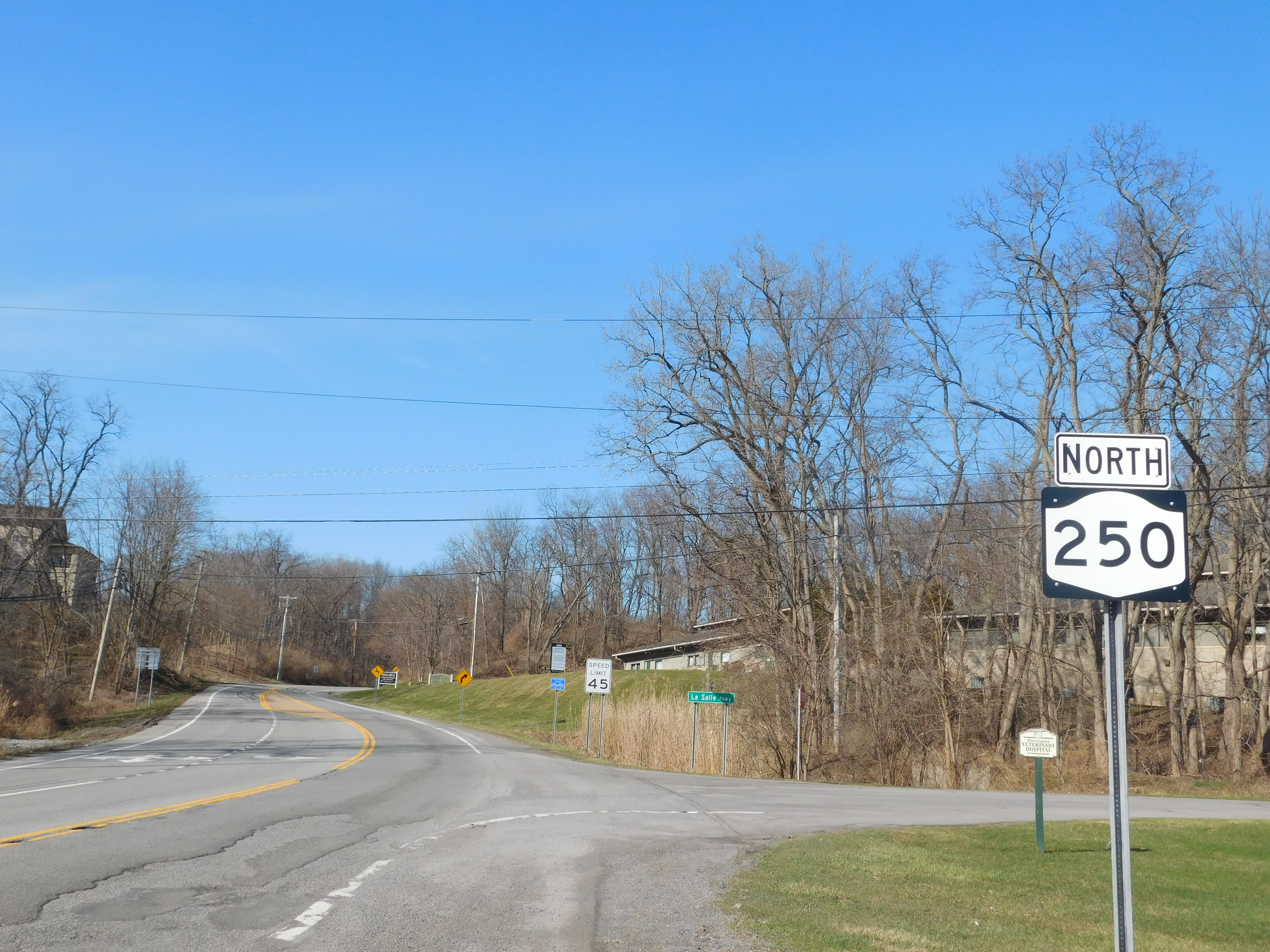
First reassurance marker on NY 250 northbound

South of Fairport, the section from modern NY 31 north to the Fairport village line was added on January 19, 1916, following a nearly $17,127 (equivalent to $494,902 in 2024) project to improve the road. Lastly, the portion south of modern NY 31 was added in the late 1920s. The four state-maintained segments were legislatively designated, but not signed, as State Highways 574, 574A, 1290, and 1836, respectively, for inventory purposes. The section of current NY 250 in Fairport between the southern village line and Liftbridge Lane was never taken over by the state and is village-maintained.

=== Designation ===
In 1908, the New York State Legislature created Route 20, an unsigned legislative route extending from Elbridge to Rochester via Fairport. Initially, Route 20 entered the village on High Street and followed Main Street south across the Erie Canal to Church Street, where it turned west toward Rochester. On March 1, 1921, Route 20 was realigned to enter Monroe County on modern NY 31. At the junction of Palmyra and Moseley Roads, Route 20 turned north, following SH 1290 into Fairport. It rejoined its original alignment at the junction of Church and Main Streets. None of SH 1290 received a signed designation when the first set of posted routes in New York were assigned in 1924.

SH 1290 was not assigned a signed designation until the 1930 renumbering of state highways in New York when it became part of NY 250, a new route that extended south over SH 1836 to NY 15 (now NY 96) in Perinton and north over SH 574A and SH 574 to Lake Road in Webster. When NY 33B—the predecessor to NY 31F—was assigned c. 1931, it entered Fairport on Church Street and turned north at NY 250, following the route across the Erie Canal to High Street, where NY 33B turned to the east. The overlap with NY 33B was replaced with a concurrency with NY 31F after the latter route largely replaced the former in the late 1940s. The overlap was eliminated on April 1, 1984, when NY 31F was rerouted out of the village along East Church Street and Turk Hill Road as the result of a highway maintenance swap between the state of New York and the village of Fairport.

== Major intersections ==
The entire route is in Monroe County.

| Location | mi | km | Destinations | Notes |
|---|---|---|---|---|
| Perinton | 0.00 | 0.00 | NY 96 | Southern terminus |
| Perinton | 2.38 | 3.83 | NY 31 | |
| Fairport | 4.45 | 7.16 | NY 31F | |
| Fairport | 4.87 | 7.84 | High Street | Former routing of NY 31F |
| Penfield | 6.67 | 10.73 | NY 441 | |
| Penfield | 8.80 | 14.16 | NY 286 | |
| Village of Webster | 12.40 | 19.96 | NY 404 | |
| Village of Webster | 12.65 | 20.36 | NY 104 – Rochester | |
| Town of Webster | 16.01 | 25.77 | Lake Road | Northern terminus, former eastern terminus of NY 18 |
1.000 mi = 1.609 km; 1.000 km = 0.621 mi
