= Fairport Lift Bridge =

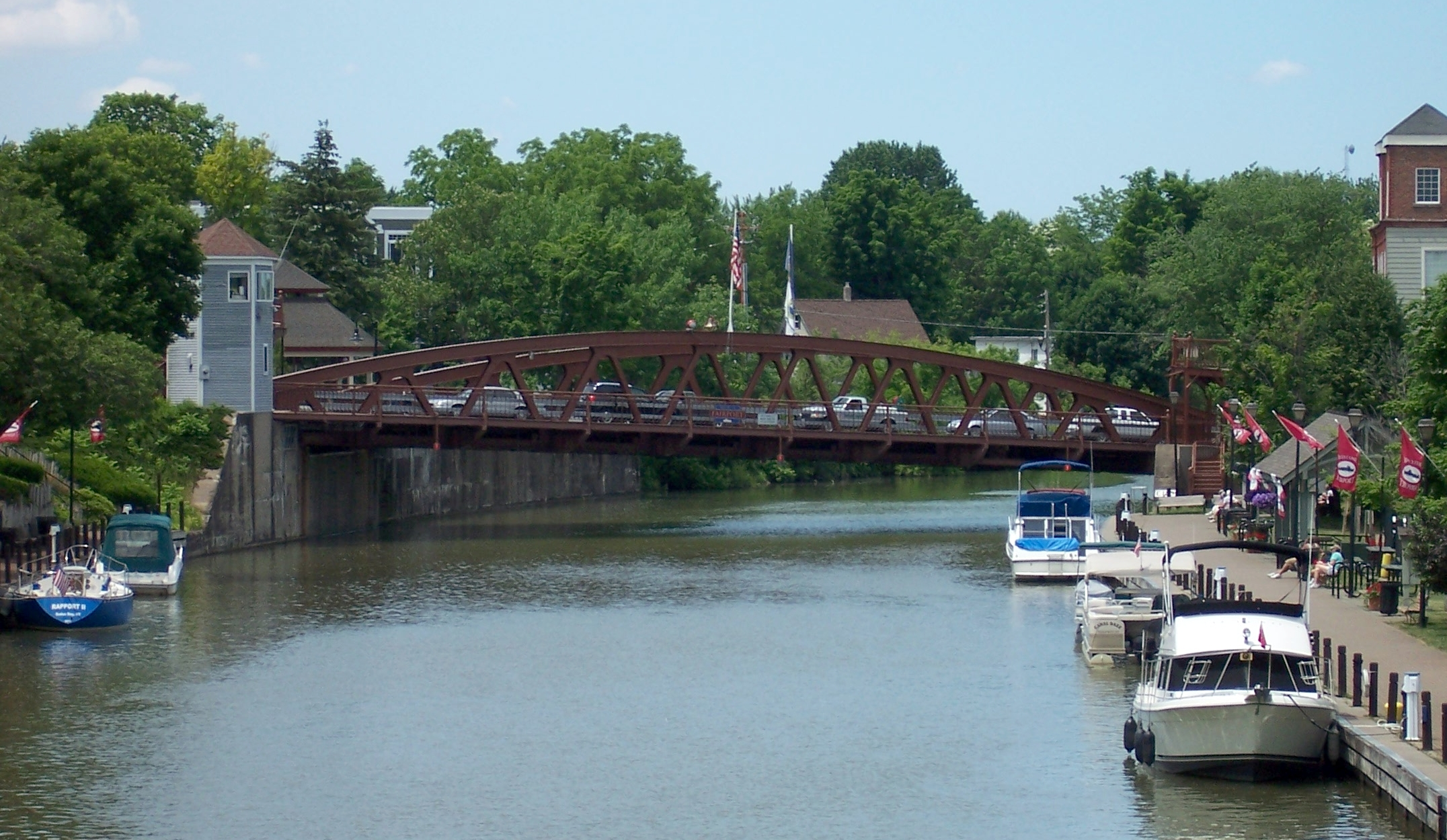
- Fairport Lift Bridge in Fairport, New York (2007)
- Coordinates: 43°06′05.80″N 77°26′30.98″W
- Carries: NY 250 (Main Street)
- Crosses: Erie Canal
- Locale: Fairport, New York
- Maintained by: NYS Department of Transportation
- ID number: E-128 (HAER NY-456)

Characteristics
- Design: Steel Warren truss vertical-lift bridge
- Total length: 160 feet (49 m)
- Width: 37 feet (11 m)
- Longest span: 139 feet (42 m)
- Clearance below: Approx. 6 feet (1.8 m) lowered Approx. 16 feet (4.9 m) raised

History
- Construction start: 1913
- Construction end: 1914
- Opened: August 15, 1914

Statistics
- Daily traffic: automobile and pedestrians
- Fairport Lift Bridge
- U.S. National Register of Historic Places
- Area: 1 acre (0.4 ha)
- Architectural style: Warren pony truss
- MPS: New York State Barge Canal
- NRHP reference No.: 14000860
- Added to NRHP: October 15, 2014

Location
- Interactive map of Fairport Lift Bridge

The Fairport Lift Bridge is a through-truss mechanical vertical-lift bridge that carries NY Route 250 (Main Street) over the Erie Canal in downtown Fairport, New York, United States. It was constructed in 1913–14 by the Lackawanna Bridge Company of Buffalo, New York, and contracted by H. S. Kerbaugh, Inc. of Philadelphia, Pennsylvania, replacing an 80-foot (24 m) fixed bridge built in 1886, which was removed when the Erie Canal was widened. The Fairport Lift Bridge officially opened to automobile traffic on August 15, 1914. Originally having a wooden deck made of yellow pine, the bridge floor was replaced with steel grating in later years. It is one of sixteen vertical lift bridges located along the western portion of the Erie Canal between Fairport and Lockport.

The 139-foot (42 m) bridge is of unique design, being a decagonal style structure with no two angles the same throughout and no square corners on the bridge floor. It also crosses the canal at a 32-degree angle with the southern side being on the higher end. Powered by 40-horsepower electric motors, the bridge has a vertical lift of 10.6 feet (3.2 m). The structure is entirely raised straight up on four corner posts despite the bridge floor having a 4-percent grade. Over an average water level on the Erie Canal, approximate clearances below the bridge are 6 feet (1.8 m) when lowered and 16 feet (4.9 m) when raised. The control building is located on the southeast side of the bridge.

Due to increased traffic usage and need of significant repairs, the Fairport Lift Bridge was threatened to be replaced in the 1970s with a new concrete bridge spanning both the railroad tracks and canal. A decision was eventually made to replace the bridge at nearby Turk Hill Road instead to ease congestion and keep the historic lift bridge in place on Main Street.

Because of its unusual appearance, the Fairport Lift Bridge was apparently listed in Ripley's Believe It or Not! On September 4, 2019, the New York State Department of Transportation closed the Fairport Lift Bridge for general maintenance and rehabilitation. It was re-opened on June 25, 2021. The bridge was previously refurbished in 1988, although some repair work was also done in 2013.

As part of the New York State Barge Canal system, the Fairport Lift Bridge was added to the National Register of Historic Places on October 15, 2014.

== See also ==
- List of bridges documented by the Historic American Engineering Record in New York
