= East Rochester, New York =

- Town and village
- Seal of East Rochester

- Location of East Rochester in Monroe County, and location of Monroe County in the state of New York

- Coordinates: 43°06′44″N 77°29′13″W
- Country: United States
- State: New York
- County: Monroe
- Incorporated: 1906; 120 years ago (as a village)
- Incorporated: 1981; 45 years ago (as a coterminous town and village)

Government
  - Town supervisor/mayor: John R. Alfieri Town council/trustees: Mark A. Florack (R); Kelley Swagler (R); Vincent E. Raschiatore (R); Ted Conners (R)

Area
  - Total: 1.32 sq mi (3.42 km^{2})
  - Land: 1.32 sq mi (3.41 km^{2})
  - Water: 0.0039 sq mi (0.01 km^{2})
- Elevation: 436 ft (133 m)

Population (2020)
  - Total: 6,334
  - Estimate (2022): 6,213
  - Density: 4,817/sq mi (1,859.8/km^{2})
- Time zone: UTC-5 (EST)
  - Summer (DST): UTC-4 (EDT)
- ZIP Code: 14445
- Area code: 585
- FIPS code: 36-055-22870
- FIPS code: 36-22865
- Website: eastrochesterny.gov

East Rochester is a coterminous town and village located southeast of the city of Rochester in Monroe County, New York, United States. The town and village was home to 6,334 people at the time of the 2020 United States census.

== History ==
=== Beginnings ===
The village of East Rochester was originally known as the village of Despatch, when the community was incorporated in 1897. Despatch was laid out as a planned community designed around the New York Central Railroad mainline that ran through the center of the village. Much of the original land which became the village came from Fairport businessman Walter Parce. This land was used to develop housing for employees of the earliest employers: the Merchants Despatch Corporation and the Aeolian Piano Corporation. The original buildings of the Aeolian Piano Corporation are still in use today as a shopping center and office complex called Piano Works Mall.

To better showcase the village's proximity to the city of Rochester, the village was incorporated as the Village of East Rochester in 1906.

The village was divided among the towns of Perinton, Pittsford, and Penfield.

On August 20, 1966, a Little League baseball team from East Rochester captured the Senior Little League World Championship by defeating La Habra California 4–2 in Des Moines, Iowa. East Rochester is the smallest community in the world to win either a Little League or Senior Little League World Championship.

The local post office building was listed on the National Register of Historic Places in 1988.

=== Coterminous status ===
In 1981, the village became a coterminous town and village.

=== Derailments ===
Two derailments have occurred on the double-track mainline railroad running through East Rochester. The first occurred on October 29, 1969, when a 30-car Penn Central freight train carrying produce derailed onto West Maple Avenue (which, along with East Maple Avenue, runs parallel to the tracks between NY 153 and South Lincoln Road), crushing numerous automobiles and toppling telephone poles. No one was injured.

On January 16, 2007, a 13-car CSX intermodal train traveling 60 mph (97 km/h) and carrying retail goods partially derailed at the South Lincoln underpass, spilling at least five containers and two intermodal wells onto the road below. The wreckage extended west from South Lincoln along East Maple Avenue to Madison Street as derailed cars crushed a number of vehicles parked alongside the tracks and dumped intermodal containers into the front yards of residents on Maple. Overall, eight wells and 15 to 20 containers came off the rails. As in 1969, no one was injured in the accident. The presence of mangled intermodal cars in the southbound lanes of Lincoln Road, as well as one teetering on the edge of the bridge, forced the closure of the road. It reopened January 18 following two days of cleanup. The 200 block of East Maple Avenue, however, remained closed for repair work for several days afterward.

== Geography ==
East Rochester is located in eastern Monroe County at 43°6′44″N 77°29′13″W (43.112413, -77.487). It is bordered by the town of Pittsford on the west side and by Perinton to the east. The town of Penfield is less than two tenths of a mile to the north. Most of the southern boundary is delimited by New York State Route 31F. Downtown Rochester is 7 miles (11 km) to the northwest via Route 31F and Route 96, while the village of Fairport is 2.5 miles (4.0 km) to the east-southeast.

According to the U.S. Census Bureau, the village has a total area of 1.4 square miles (3.6 km^{2}), all land; Irondequoit Creek runs along the eastern edge of the village.

== Demographics ==
Historical population
| Census | Pop. | Note | %± |
|---|---|---|---|
| 1910 | 2,398 | | — |
| 1920 | 3,901 | | 62.7% |
| 1930 | 6,627 | | 69.9% |
| 1940 | 6,691 | | 1.0% |
| 1950 | 7,022 | | 4.9% |
| 1960 | 8,152 | | 16.1% |
| 1970 | 8,347 | | 2.4% |
| 1980 | 7,596 | | −9.0% |
| 1990 | 6,932 | | −8.7% |
| 2000 | 6,650 | | −4.1% |
| 2010 | 6,587 | | −0.9% |
| 2020 | 6,334 | | −3.8% |
U.S. Decennial Census

As of the census of 2000, there were 6,650 people, 2,774 households, and 1,625 families residing in the village. The population density was 4,915.4 inhabitants per square mile (1,897.8/km^{2}). There were 2,916 housing units at an average density of 2,155.4 units per square mile (832.2 units/km^{2}). The racial makeup of the village was 95.92% White, 1.38% African American, 0.26% Native American, 0.74% Asian, 0.02% Pacific Islander, 0.36% from other races, and 1.32% from two or more races. 2.38% of the population were Hispanic or Latino of any race.

There were 2,774 households, out of which 29.7% had children under the age of 18 living with them, 39.4% were married couples living together, 15.0% had a female householder with no husband present, and 41.4% were non-families. 34.1% of all households were made up of individuals, and 12.6% had someone living alone who was 65 years of age or older. The average household size was 2.34 and the average family size was 3.04.

In the village, the population was spread out, with 24.1% under the age of 18, 8.7% from 18 to 24, 31.7% from 25 to 44, 20.8% from 45 to 64, and 14.8% who were 65 years of age or older. The median age was 36 years. For every 100 females, there were 88.2 males. For every 100 females age 18 and over, there were 83.1 males.

The median income for a household in the village was $39,221, and the median income for a family was $48,553. Males had a median income of $32,094 versus $26,953 for females. The per capita income for the village was $18,875. About 6.2% of families and 9.3% of the population were below the poverty line, including 10.8% of those under age 18 and 5.3% of those age 65 or over.

== Government ==
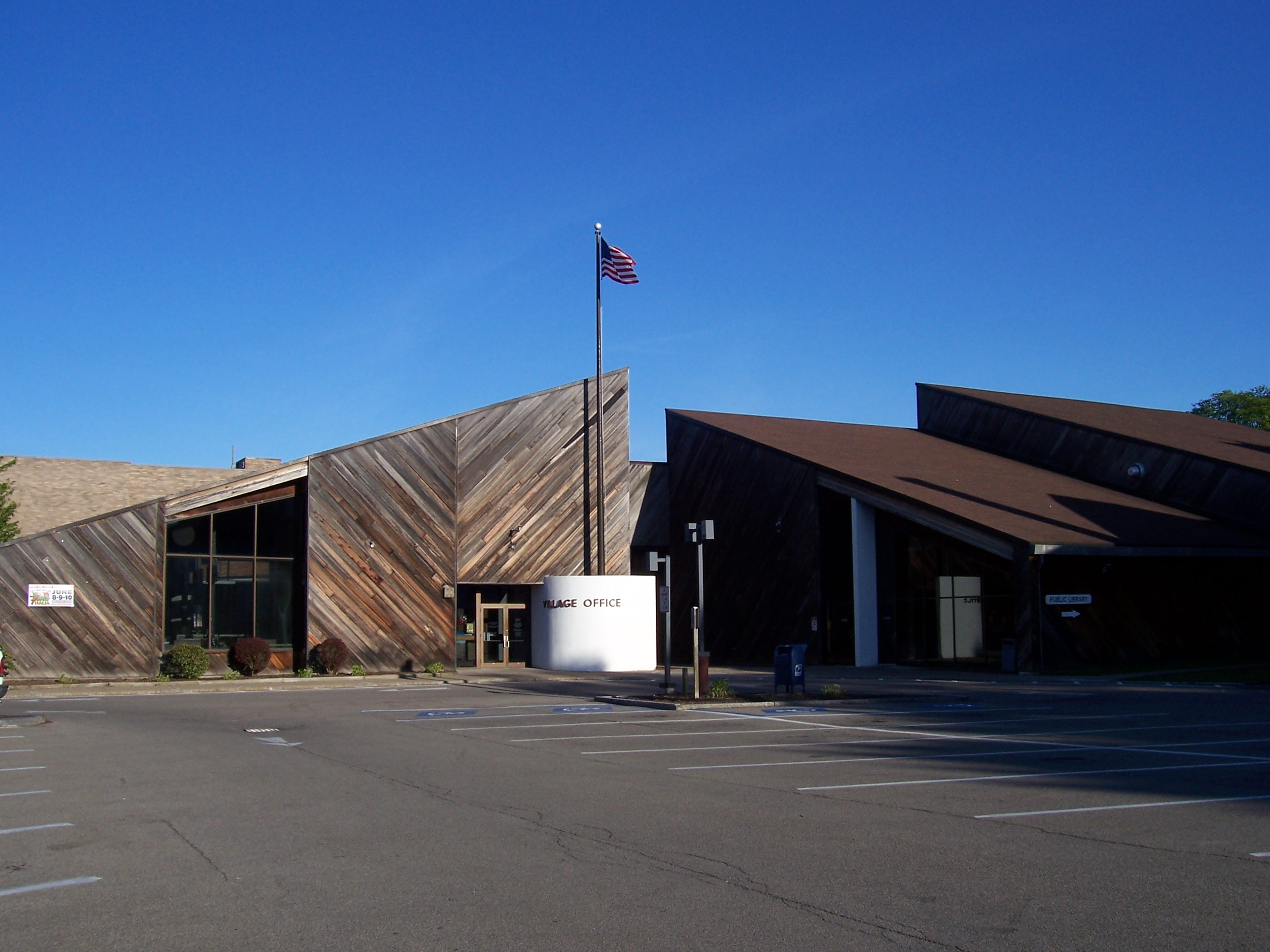
East Rochester village office

The village is governed by a mayor and village board on which the mayor, deputy mayor, and three elected village trustees are seated. By General municipal Law the Village Administrator runs the day-to-day operations. There are additional boards for architectural review, assessment review, library, and zoning appeals, two commissions for the village cable channel and planning, and a housing authority.

Village presidents and mayors
| Name | Title | Term |
|---|---|---|
| T. Joseph Mitchell | President | 1907–1909 |
| Howard R. Worden | President | 1909–1910 |
| William J. Genthner | President | 1910–1911 |
| Charles H. Derby | President | 1911–1913 |
| Charles S. King | President | 1913–1914 |
| Howard R. Worden | President; Mayor | 1914–1928; 1928–1931 |
| George H. McInerney | Mayor | 1931–1933 |
| W. Duane Smith | Mayor | 1933–1935 |
| T. Joseph Mitchell | Mayor | 1935–1936 |
| George Schreib | Mayor | 1936–1947 |
| Lee R. Arcuri | Mayor | 1947–1949 |
| Howard A. Hustleby | Mayor | 1949–1951 |
| Kenneth D. Mackenzie | Mayor | 1951–1953 |
| Paul N. Bower | Mayor | 1953–1971 |
| Anthony DellaPietra | Mayor | 1971–1979 |
| Ralph Celantani | Mayor | 1979–1983 |
| Peter D. Quinzi | Mayor | 1983–2000 |
| David P. Bonacchi | Mayor | 2000–2007 |
| Jason W. Koon | Mayor | December 1, 2007 – November 30, 2011 |
| Frederick L. Ricci | Mayor | December 1, 2011 – November 30, 2019 |
| John R. Alfieri | Mayor | December 1, 2019 – present |

== Transportation ==
Three state highways enter the vicinity of East Rochester: NY 31F, better known locally as Fairport Road, New York State Route 153 (Washington Street), and unsigned New York State Route 940U (West Commercial Street). NY 153 has the highest average annual daily traffic of any street serving East Rochester proper, carrying 11,000 vehicles per day between NY 31F and Commercial and 18,000 vehicles daily from Commercial to Linden Avenue as of 2004. NY 31F carries over 27,000 vehicles per day but does not enter the village. NY 153 is also the only north–south street in the village that runs from one end of the village to the other and continues into neighboring towns. Linden Avenue is the only such east–west street.

Rochester-Genesee Regional Transportation Authority routes 81 and 82 service the village, connecting it directly to neighboring Fairport and Rochester and providing an express route for commuting between the two villages and the city.

The double-tracked CSX Transportation Rochester Subdivision rail line runs east–west through East Rochester, dividing the town in half. No grade crossings exist within the East Rochester limits. Two streets, NY 153 and South Lincoln Road, pass under the mainline by way of underpasses roughly 0.5 mi (0.8 km) apart.

== Emergency response ==
Access to emergency services is obtained by dialing 9-1-1 which connects the caller to the City of Rochester's Emergency Communications Department (9-1-1 Center). The East Rochester Police Department provides primary law enforcement for the town residents.

The East Rochester Fire Department is staffed by volunteers and provides emergency fire, rescue and non-transport emergency medical services within the town.

American Medical Response provides service to East Rochester Volunteer which includes primary emergency medical response, including Basic Life Support, with trained Emergency Medical Technicians.

== Notable person ==
- Robert Trent Jones, golf course architect
