= Irondequoit Creek =

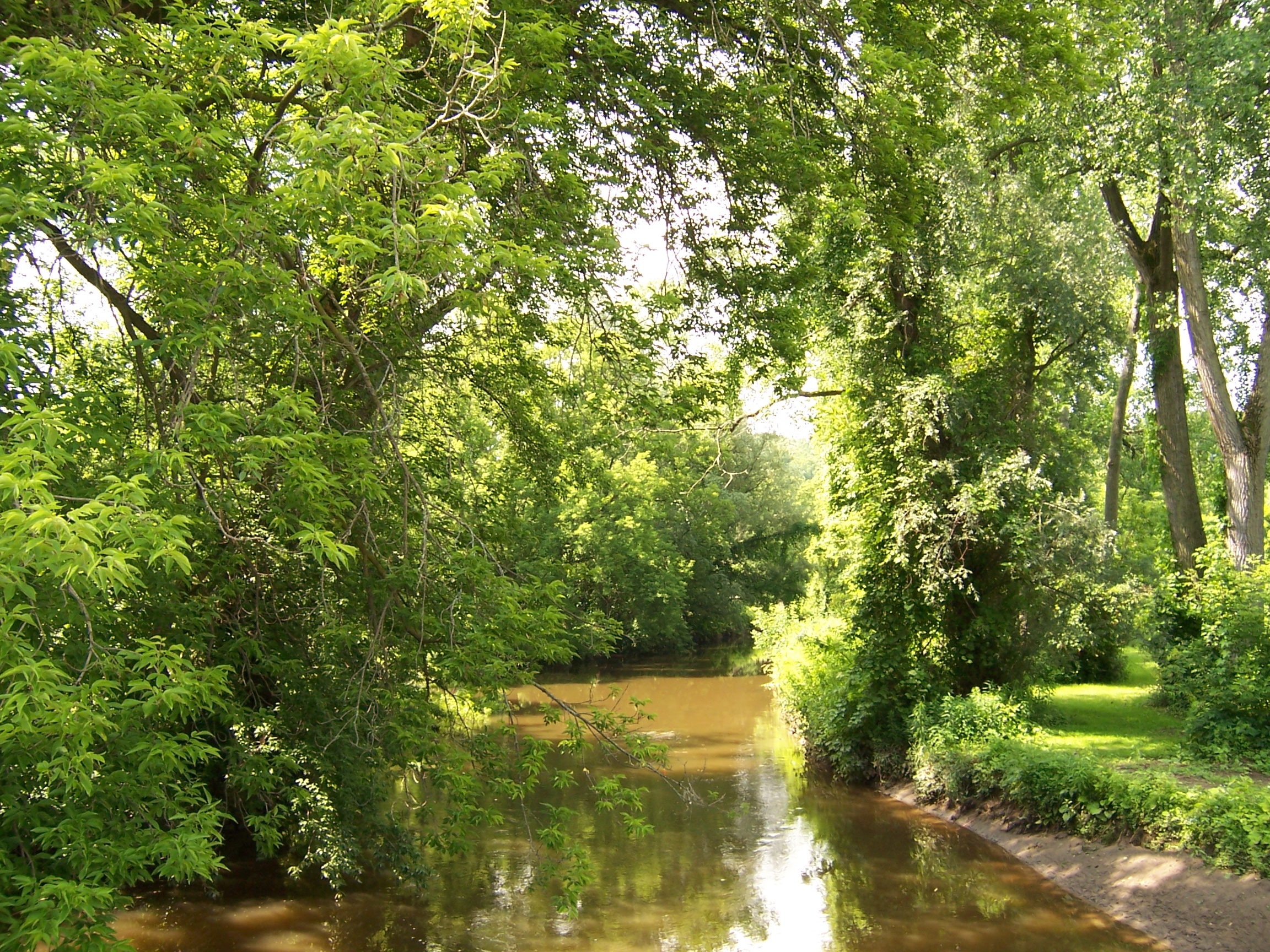
- Irondequoit Creek in the town of Penfield, New York.

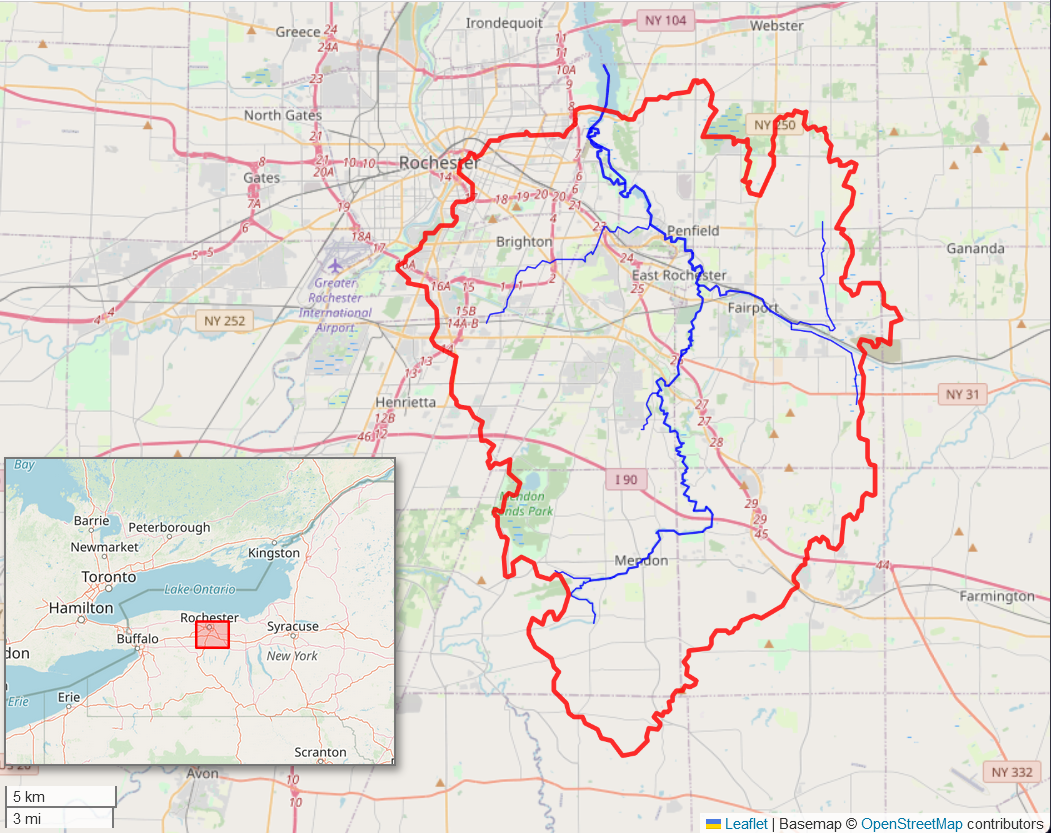
- Map of the Irondequoit Creek watershed

Location
- Country: United States
- State: New York

Physical characteristics
- Source
  - location: Ontario County, New York
  - coordinates: 42°55′49″N 77°31′40″W
- Mouth: Irondequoit Bay
  - location: Monroe County, New York
  - coordinates: 43°10′39″N 77°31′32″W

Basin features
- Tributaries
  - left: Allen Creek
  - right: Trout Creek, Thomas Creek

Irondequoit Creek is a stream in eastern Monroe County, New York that feeds Irondequoit Bay. It begins in rural West Bloomfield in Ontario County, flowing north into the town of Mendon in Monroe County. Accumulating a few small tributaries, it twists eastward back into the Ontario County town of Victor, then back north into Monroe County, where it flows through the towns of Perinton and Penfield on its way to the bay. It also skirts the edge of the combined town and village of East Rochester.

The creek is believed to lie in a valley carved out by a pre-glacial Genesee River, which at the time would have flowed into Lake Ontario where Irondequoit Bay does today. Glacial debris caused the river to be rerouted as the glaciers retreated, leaving only the comparatively small creek (Rogers 1893).

The first settlements in the town of Penfield sprang up along the creek, as its waters were well suited to mills. The Daisy Flour Mill, previously a restaurant, was the last of over a dozen mills that once used the creek's waters.

The creek's valley caused a problem for the engineers of the original Erie Canal. To maintain a level canal route the engineers built the Great Embankment that carried the canal above Irondequoit creek with a culvert allowing it to flow beneath. The embankment helped avoid additional locks in the area as well as showing the difficulties.

Irondequoit creek has a diverse aquatic ecosystem and is considered one of the best trout streams in New York State. The New York State Department of Environmental Conservation stocks the creek annually with rainbow and brown trout for year-round fishing.

At the mouth of the creek is Ellison Park wetland which plays an important ecological role in filtering water and providing habitat for wildlife. A U.S. Geological Survey studied the wetlands hydrology, sedimentology and biology. The wetland helps moderate water flow into the Irodequoit Bay and contributes to the ecological health of the creek.
