= New York State Route 47 =

Highway in New York

New York State Route 47
- Rochester Outer Loop
- Map of Rochester with NY 47 highlighted in red

Route information
- Maintained by NYSDOT and the city of Rochester
- Length: 19.34 mi (31.12 km)
- Existed: c. 1937–March 18, 1980

Major junctions
- West end: NY 104 in Greece
- I-490 in Rochester
- East end: Culver Road in Irondequoit

Location
- Country: United States
- State: New York
- Counties: Monroe

Highway system
- New York Highways; Interstate; US; State; Reference; Parkways
← NY 46A	→ NY 48

New York State Route 47 (NY 47) was a 19.34-mile (31.12 km) long state highway around Rochester in New York, in the United States. It formed a semicircle through the inner suburbs of Rochester, following expressways west and east of the city and surface streets south of Rochester. The western terminus of the route was at an interchange with NY 104 west of the city limits in Greece. The eastern terminus was at an intersection with Culver Road in Irondequoit close to Lake Ontario. In between its western and eastern extents, NY 47 met Interstate 490 (I-490) twice. The limited-access highway portions of the route were known as the Rochester Outer Loop (or Outer Loop) in contrast to the Inner Loop around downtown Rochester.

NY 47 was originally routed along surface streets through the city when it was assigned c. 1937. It began at NY 31 in Gates and followed Howard Road and Brooks Avenue southeast into Rochester, where it continued eastward on Genesee Park Boulevard and Elmwood Avenue. NY 47 remained on the latter through Brighton to an area known as Twelve Corners. At this point, the route turned north onto Winton Road and followed that street through the eastern fringe of the city to Irondequoit, where NY 47 ended at a junction with U.S. Route 104 (US 104, now NY 404). The Outer Loop was constructed in stages, beginning with the portion of the Sea Breeze Expressway north of Ridge Road in the early 1950s. From that point on, construction progressed in a generally clockwise fashion around the city.

By the late 1960s and early 1970s, the Outer Loop was complete from NY 383 to US 104 west of the city and from modern I-590 exit 1 to the lakeshore east of Rochester. NY 47 followed the loop from US 104 south to NY 383 and from Elmwood Avenue north to modern NY 590 exit 8; north of that point, the expressway was part of US 104 and NY 18. NY 47 was extended northward along the remainder of the Sea Breeze Expressway in 1970. On March 18, 1980, the NY 47 designation was removed and replaced with several others, primarily I-390, I-590, NY 390, and NY 590.

== Route description ==
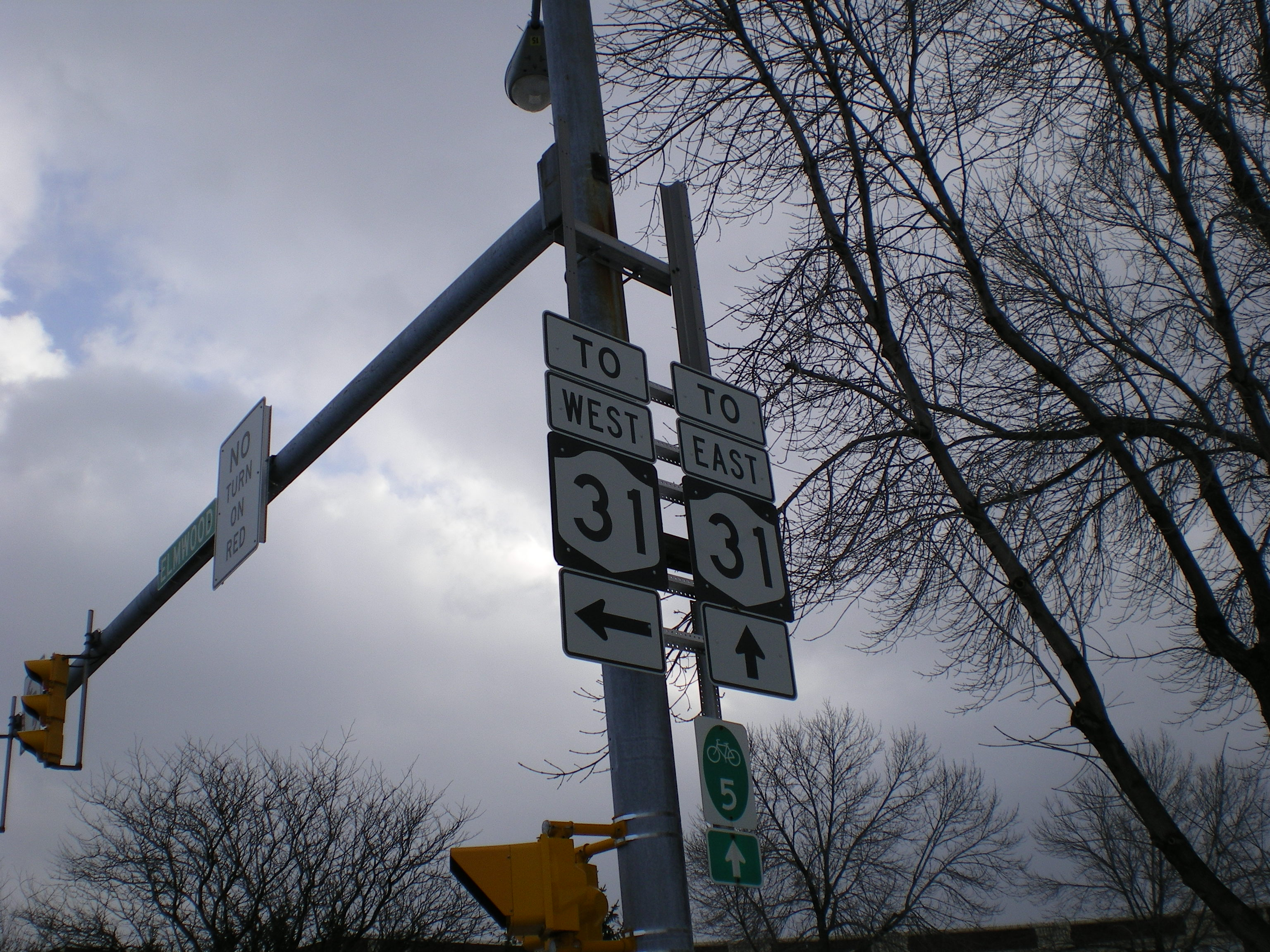
Sign assembly on Elmwood Avenue at Winton Road. The empty upper portion was where signage for NY 47 was once mounted.

NY 47 followed a half-circle routing around the city of Rochester, beginning northwest of downtown in the town of Greece and proceeding generally counterclockwise around the city before ending northeast of downtown at the Lake Ontario shoreline in Irondequoit. The limited-access highway portions of NY 47 were named the "Rochester Outer Loop" (or "Outer Loop") in contrast to the Inner Loop around downtown Rochester. This moniker remains in use to this day, now referring to the designations that have since replaced NY 47 along the loop. Conceptually, NY 104 completes the Outer Loop along the north side of the city. However, only the section east of the Genesee River is expressway, leaving NY 104 from modern NY 390 to the Veterans Memorial Bridge as the only at-grade portion of the loop. The at-grade portion of NY 47 along Scottsville Road and Elmwood Avenue was known as the "Rochester Bypass" prior to the completion of the Outer Loop. The alignment described within this section is of NY 47 upon its removal in 1980.

=== Western expressway ===
NY 47 began at an interchange with NY 104 (now the interchange between NY 390 and NY 104) in Greece one mile (1.6 km) west of the Rochester city limits. Although, at the time, the freeway terminated just north of the interchange, the interchange itself was roughly complete, with only ramps to and from future NY 390 north of the interchange missing. NY 47 followed the modern NY 390 alignment south to I-490, where NY 47 continued onto what is now I-390. The routings of NY 47 and current I-390 were identical to NY 383 (Scottsville Road) in Chili, where NY 47 was forced to grade level via a partially constructed interchange, as modern I-390 had yet to be constructed in the area southeast of NY 383.

=== At-grade ===
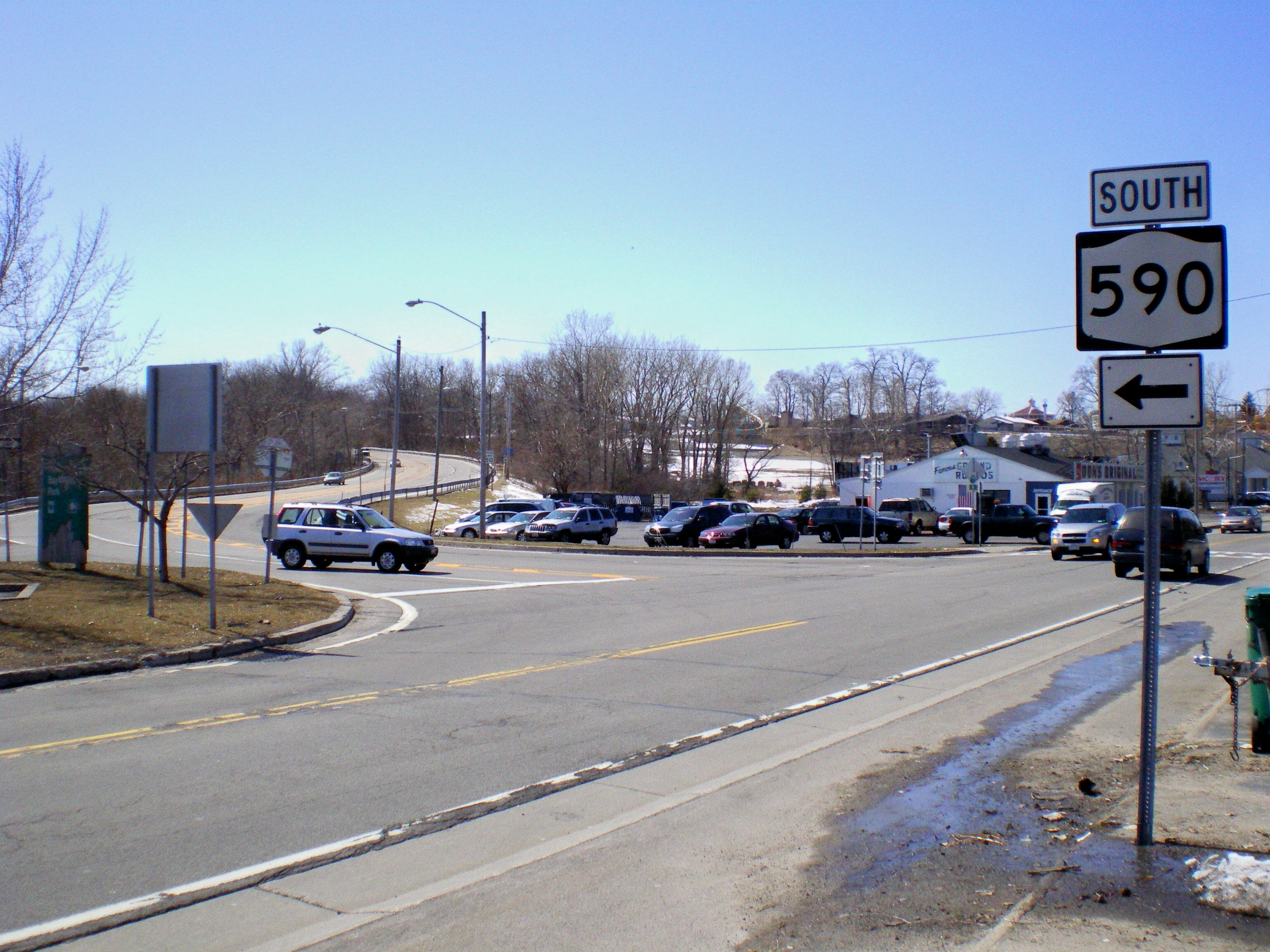
NY 47's final eastern terminus was at this intersection with Culver Road in Irondequoit (shown as it was in March 2008). This part of NY 47 became NY 590.

Off the expressway and now at-grade, NY 47 turned north onto NY 383, forming a short concurrency with NY 383 into Rochester. At Elmwood Avenue, NY 47 and NY 383 departed Scottsville Road and proceeded eastward on Elmwood Avenue. Two blocks to the east, at an intersection with South Plymouth Avenue, NY 383 split from NY 47, following Plymouth Avenue into downtown Rochester. NY 47 remained routed on Elmwood Avenue, crossing the Genesee River and passing north of Strong Memorial Hospital prior to intersecting NY 15 (Mount Hope Avenue) in the shadow of Mount Hope Cemetery. East of NY 15, NY 47 progressed along Elmwood Avenue, intersecting several local streets before entering Brighton.

Within Brighton, NY 47 continued on Elmwood Avenue through "Twelve Corners", intersecting NY 31 (Monroe Avenue) at the location, to what is now I-590. At the northbound entrance ramp of the modern interchange between I-590 and Elmwood Avenue, NY 47 separated from the latter, entering the freeway. While what is now I-590 was constructed and open from Winton Road to I-490, it had no signed designation between Winton and Elmwood.

=== Eastern expressway ===
NY 47 followed modern I-590 northward through Brighton to the Can of Worms, where NY 47 met I-490 for the second time. Due to the way the interchange was designed at the time, traffic continuing on NY 47 across I-490 had to merge with I-490 traffic for roughly 1,000 feet (305 m) before exiting I-490 onto the other portion of NY 47. North of I-490, NY 47 followed the length of what is now NY 590 through Brighton, Rochester, and Irondequoit to Culver Road at the Lake Ontario shoreline.

== History ==
=== Original alignment ===
Old NY 47 in red and blue, and NY 940L in blue

When NY 47 was first commissioned in the Rochester area c. 1937, it was routed along previously unnumbered roadways, with its northwest terminus located at the intersection of NY 31 (Lyell Avenue) and Howard Road in Gates. NY 47 took Howard Road south, passing through Gates Center and intersecting NY 33 before crossing the then-New York Central Railroad main line (now the CSX Transportation-owned Rochester Subdivision) at-grade. The route remained on Howard Road until the intersection of Howard Road and Chili Avenue (NY 33A), which also included Brooks Avenue at this juncture of time. NY 47 turned east onto Brooks Avenue and proceeded toward the Greater Rochester International Airport, joining the current routing of NY 204 at Beahan Road (now Old Beahan Road).

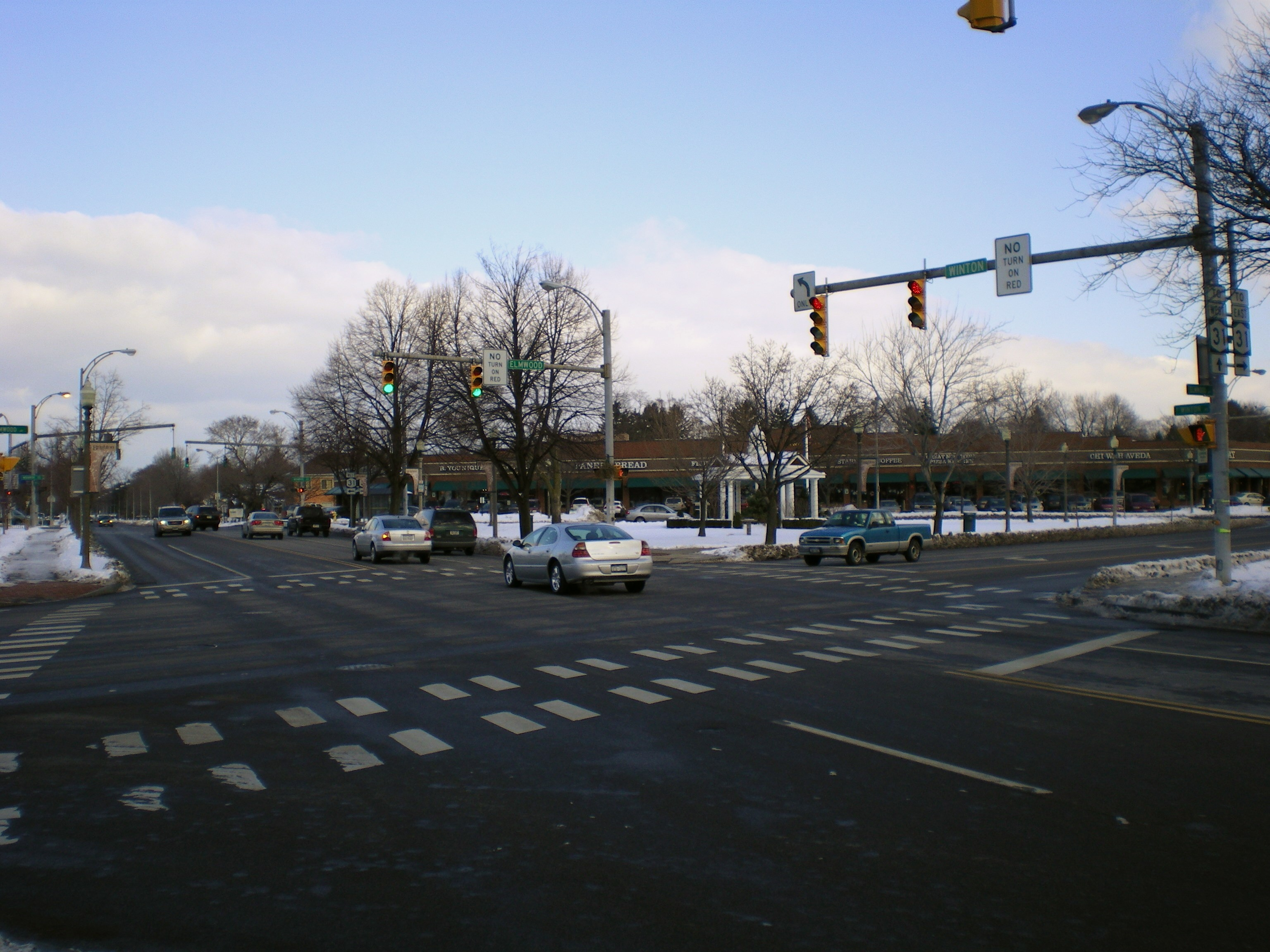
The intersection of Elmwood Avenue and Winton Road at Twelve Corners in Brighton. NY 47 entered on Elmwood from the left and turned north here onto Winton.

NY 47 followed the entire alignment of NY 204 to what is now I-390 and continued on Brooks Avenue into Rochester to Genesee Park Boulevard. Route 47 turned south onto the street, which circles around the southwestern quadrant of the city, and followed its length to Genesee Street, where it turned south for a short distance before resuming its eastward alignment on Elmwood Avenue. The route remained on Elmwood Avenue into Brighton, where it turned north onto South Winton Road at Twelve Corners. At Highland Avenue, NY 47 reentered Rochester and became North Winton Road at East Avenue (NY 96). The route remained on Winton through Rochester and Irondequoit before terminating at Empire Boulevard (then US 104, now NY 404) just west of Irondequoit Bay.

=== Expressway realignments ===
==== East of Rochester ====
In the early 1950s, construction began on the Sea Breeze Expressway, a mostly limited-access highway linking the Lake Ontario shoreline to the proposed I-490 east of Rochester. The first portion of the road, a divided highway extending from East Ridge Road in Irondequoit to Culver Road just west of the Irondequoit Bay Outlet, was opened to traffic by 1954 as a realignment of NY 18. Construction on a limited-access extension south to Empire Boulevard (three blocks west of NY 47's western terminus) began at some point between 1956 and 1958 and was completed by 1960 as a realignment of US 104. Another extension of the highway south to the partially complete I-490 in Brighton was completed c. 1961 and largely became part of a rerouted NY 47 by the following year. At the time, NY 47 left the expressway at Blossom Road and followed it west to Winton Road, where it rejoined its original routing.

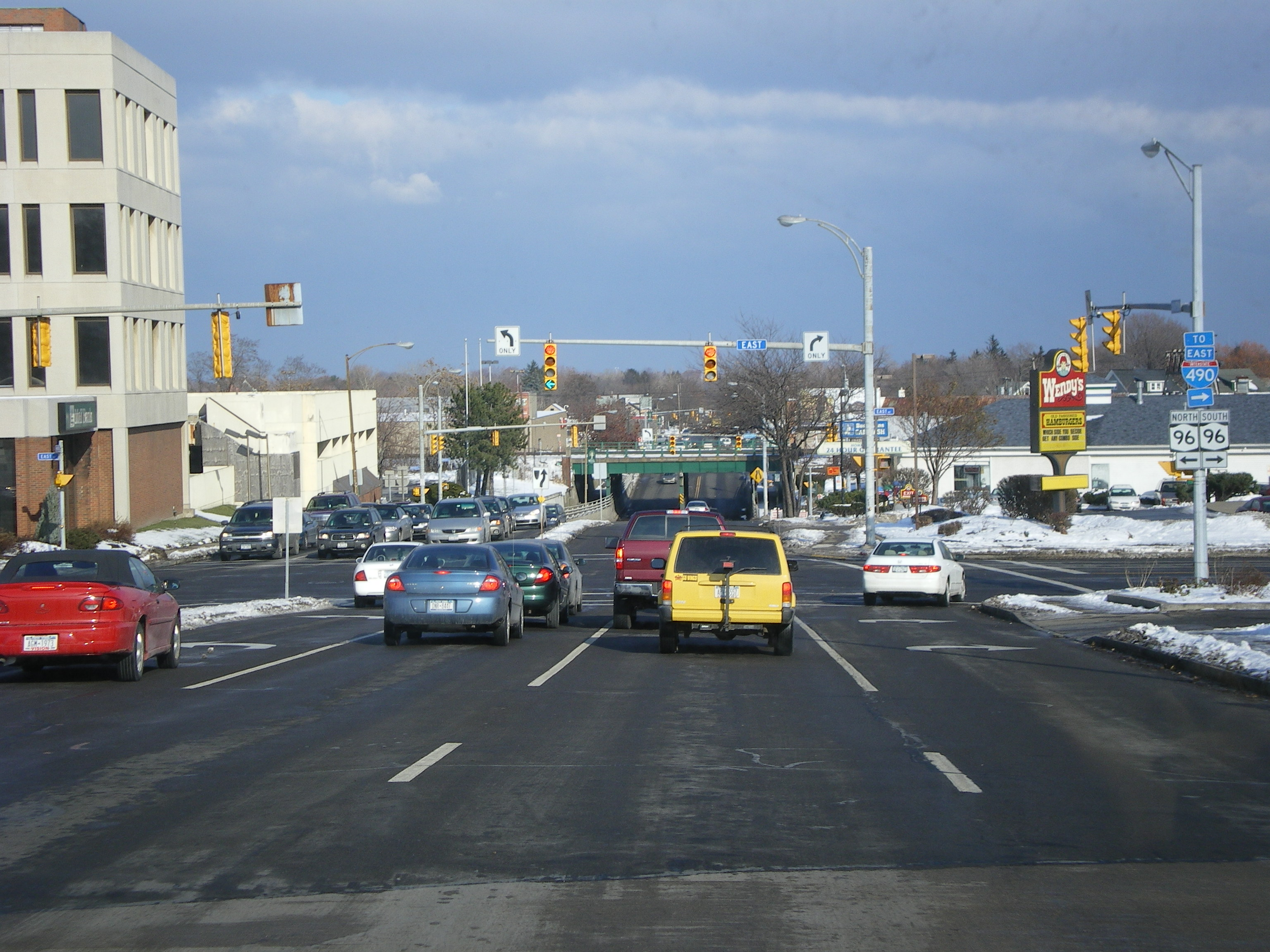
Winton Road (former NY 47) at NY 96 in Rochester

By 1964, construction was underway on a new expressway leading south from I-490 at the Can of Worms to Elmwood Avenue east of Twelve Corners. The highway was completed c. 1965, at which time NY 47 was realigned to follow the Sea Breeze Expressway and the new expressway south through the Can of Worms to its end at a partial interchange with Elmwood Avenue (now I-590 exit 3). It continued west on Elmwood Avenue to Twelve Corners, where it reconnected to its old alignment at Winton Road.

==== West of Rochester ====
The first realignment of NY 47 west of the city occurred c. 1962 when it was rerouted between Chili and Elmwood Avenues to bypass the then-Rochester–Monroe County Airport to the south. Instead of turning east onto Brooks Avenue as it did prior to 1962, the route continued south on Beahan Road to Scottsville Road (NY 383), where it turned to overlap NY 383 north to Elmwood Avenue. At the time, Beahan Road connected directly to Scottsville Road (via modern Old Beahan Road) as the primary runway southwest of the airport had yet to be extended to its present length. By 1962, construction was underway on a new limited-access highway paralleling NY 47 (Howard Road) to the east between NY 31 and NY 33. Within two years, work had begun on an extension of the highway south along the Erie Canal to Scottsville Road. Farther east, construction was underway on a new highway leading south from I-490 to Elmwood Avenue east of Twelve Corners.

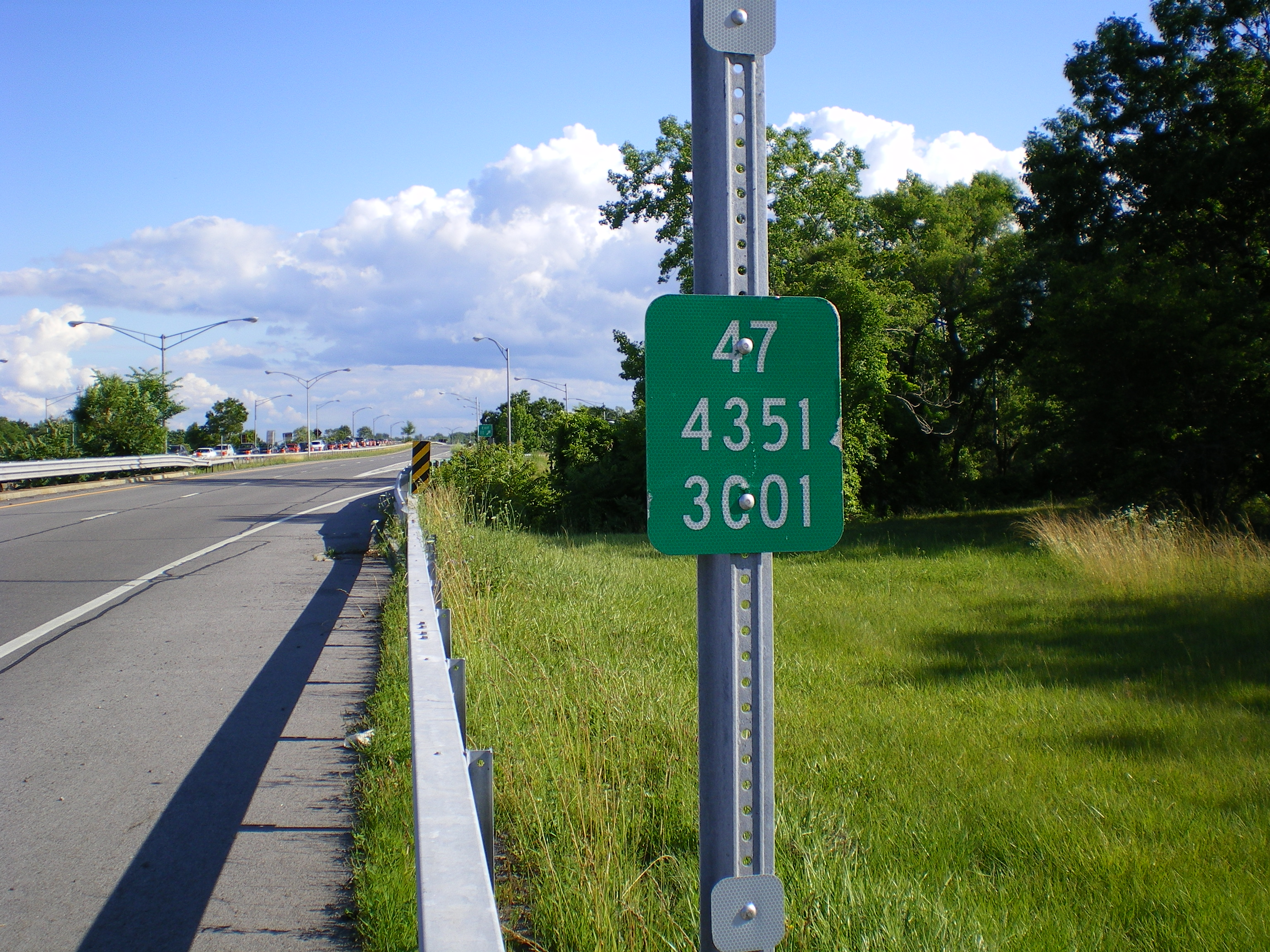
Reference marker for NY 47 on NY 590 in Irondequoit

All of the limited-access highway between NY 31 and NY 383 opened to traffic c. 1965. NY 47 was reconfigured to begin a half-mile (0.8 km) to the east of Howard Road at modern NY 390 exit 21 and follow the new highway southeastward to its temporary end at what is now I-390 exit 17 east of the airport. At this point, NY 47 joined its pre-1965 routing and followed NY 383 northeastward into the city limits. By 1968, construction was underway on a northward extension of the expressway to US 104 in Greece. It was completed and opened to traffic by 1971.

=== Extensions and deletion ===
NY 47 was officially extended on both ends on January 1, 1970, to terminate at Lake Ontario on opposite sides of Rochester. In Greece, the designation officially followed what is now NY 390 north to the Lake Ontario State Parkway; however, the portion between US 104 and the parkway had yet to be constructed. To the east in Irondequoit, NY 47 was stretched northward along the Sea Breeze Expressway to Culver Road, resulting in overlaps with both US 104 and NY 18. At the time, the overlap with US 104 existed only between Empire Boulevard and the Keeler Street Expressway, which became the new alignment of the route through Irondequoit after its completion in 1969. The overlap with US 104 was eliminated entirely the following year when that route was realigned onto a new expressway alignment between NY 47 and Webster that traversed Irondequoit Bay via the newly built Irondequoit Bay Bridge. The overlap with NY 18 was eliminated c. 1973 when NY 18 was truncated to its current eastern terminus in Kodak Park.

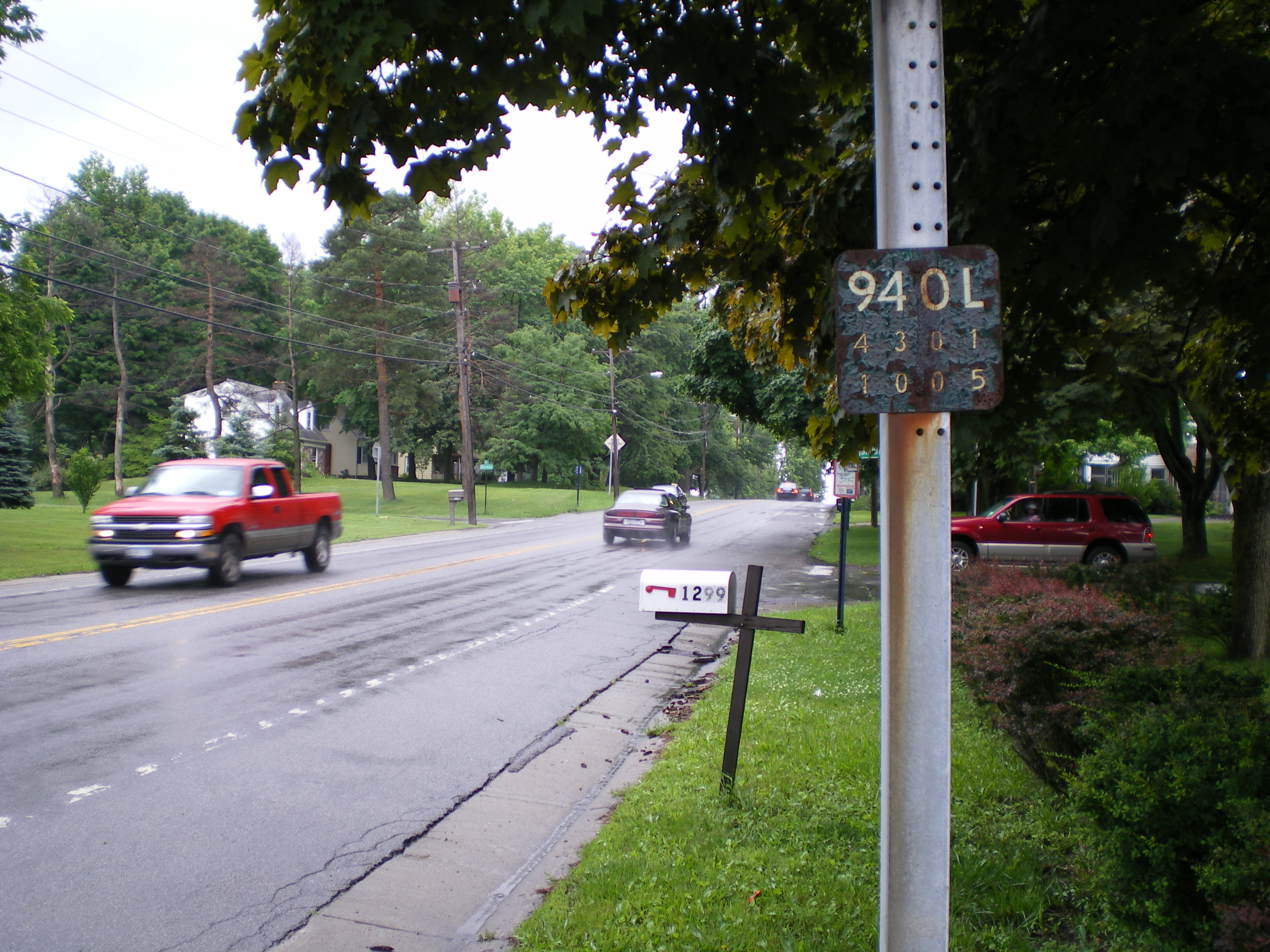
Old, rusted reference marker for NY 940L along Howard Road (former NY 47) in Gates

On March 18, 1980, the NY 47 designation was eliminated and split into four other routes. From NY 104 in Greece to I-490, NY 47 became NY 390. The section from I-490 south to NY 383 was designated as part of I-390; however, it would not connect to the existing portion of I-390 south of Rochester until 1981, when the interchange between I-390 and I-590 was completed. The segment of NY 47 from Elmwood Avenue north to the Can of Worms became part of I-590, which continued southwest along the freeway to Winton Road. From the Can of Worms to Lake Ontario, NY 47 was redesignated NY 590.

Off the expressways, the former alignments of NY 47 now carry several designations. Howard Road, bypassed by the 1960s realignment in Gates, is still maintained by the New York State Department of Transportation as NY 940L, an unsigned reference route 2.37 miles (3.81 km) in length. Beahan Road, also bypassed by the same 1960s rerouting, was reconfigured into its current alignment by 1971 due to an expansion by the airport. The section of Beahan Road that carried NY 47 is currently maintained by Monroe County as part of County Route 164 (CR 164), the county's unsigned designation for all of Beahan Road. The portion of NY 47 on Elmwood Avenue from the Rochester city line to I-590 is also maintained by Monroe County as part of CR 87. Lastly, the segments of Winton Road outside of the Rochester city limits are now part of CR 98. The remainder of c. 1980 NY 47 and the former alignments of the route are currently locally maintained.

== Major intersections ==
The entire route was in Monroe County.

Location	mi	km	Destinations	Notes
Town of Greece	0.00	0.00	NY 104	Now exit 24 (NY 390)
Rochester	3.09	4.97	NY 31	Now exit 21 (NY 390)
Rochester	3.57	5.75	I-490	Now exit 20 (I-390 / NY 390)
Chili	4.92	7.92	NY 33A	Now exit 19 (I-390)
Chili	5.63	9.06	NY 204	Now exit 18 (I-390)
Chili	6.34	10.20	NY 383 south	Western terminus of NY 47 / NY 383 overlap; now exit 17 (I-390)
Rochester	7.06	11.36	NY 383 north	Eastern terminus of NY 47 / NY 383 overlap
Rochester	7.95	12.79	NY 15	
Brighton	10.72	17.25	NY 31	
Rochester	12.60	20.28	I-490	Can of Worms; now exit 5 (I-590 / NY 590)
Rochester	13.76	22.14	NY 286	Western terminus of NY 286; now exit 7 (NY 590)
Irondequoit	15.12	24.33	NY 404	Western terminus of NY 404; now exit 8 (NY 590)
Irondequoit	16.62	26.75	NY 104	Now exit 10 (NY 590)
Irondequoit	17.08	27.49	East Ridge Road	Former routing of NY 18 and US 104
Irondequoit	19.34	31.12	Culver Road	Former routing of NY 18
1.000 mi = 1.609 km; 1.000 km = 0.621 mi: Concurrency terminus
