= New York State Route 47 (disambiguation) =

New York State Route 47 was a state highway that encircled the city of Rochester in New York, United States. It was established in the mid-1930s and removed in 1980.

New York State Route 47 may also refer to:

- New York State Route 47 (1920s–1930) in Warren and Essex Counties
- New York State Route 47 (1930–1936) in Warren County
