= New York State Route 286 =

State highway near Rochester, New York, US

New York State Route 286
- Map of the Rochester area with NY 286 highlighted in red and NY 941V in blue

Route information
- Maintained by NYSDOT and Wayne County
- Length: 13.05 mi (21.00 km)
- Existed: January 1, 1949–present

Major junctions
- West end: NY 590 in Rochester
- East end: NY 350 in Walworth

Location
- Country: United States
- State: New York
- Counties: Monroe, Wayne

Highway system
- New York Highways; Interstate; US; State; Reference; Parkways
← NY 285	→ I-287
← NY 383	NY 383B	→ NY 384

New York State Route 286 (NY 286) is an east–west state highway in the vicinity of the city of Rochester, New York, in the United States. It links Rochester to its eastern suburbs and to western Wayne County. The western terminus of the route is at exit 7 on NY 590 just inside the Rochester city limits. Its eastern terminus is at NY 350 in Walworth. NY 286 is named Browncroft Boulevard from NY 590 to its junction with Qualtrough and Clark roads in Penfield. This portion of the highway passes through predominantly residential areas. East of this intersection, the route is known as Atlantic Avenue and traverses more rural areas.

The entirety of NY 286 east of Blossom Road was originally designated as part of NY 35 during the 1930 renumbering of state highways in New York. NY 35 exited Rochester on Blossom Road and followed it east to modern NY 286. The remainder of Browncroft Boulevard was designated as New York State Route 35B, an alternate route of NY 35, in the mid-1930s. The NY 35 and NY 35B designations were eliminated in the early 1940s and replaced with NY 383 and New York State Route 383B, respectively. NY 383 was truncated to downtown Rochester in 1949, at which time its former routing from Rochester to Walworth became NY 286. NY 383B was renumbered accordingly to New York State Route 286A.

In the 1960s, the portion of Browncroft Boulevard from the Sea Breeze Expressway to Blossom Road was upgraded into a divided highway. NY 286 was rerouted to follow the improved Browncroft Boulevard while NY 286A was shifted south onto NY 286's former alignment along Blossom Road. The NY 286A designation was removed in the early 1970s, but Blossom Road remains state-maintained as NY 941V, an unsigned reference route.

== Route description ==
NY 286 begins at the ramp connecting NY 590 southbound to Browncroft Boulevard just inside the Rochester city limits. It heads east through residential surroundings as a four-lane highway, proceeding through the remainder of NY 590 exit 7 as it enters the northernmost portion of the town of Brighton. East of NY 590, NY 286 widens to become a divided highway. It passes into Penfield upon crossing Irondequoit Creek and curves southeast as it straddles the northern boundary of Ellison Park. During this stretch, it intersects with Old Browncroft Boulevard, the pre-divided highway alignment of Browncroft Boulevard which is now discontinuous near its midpoint.

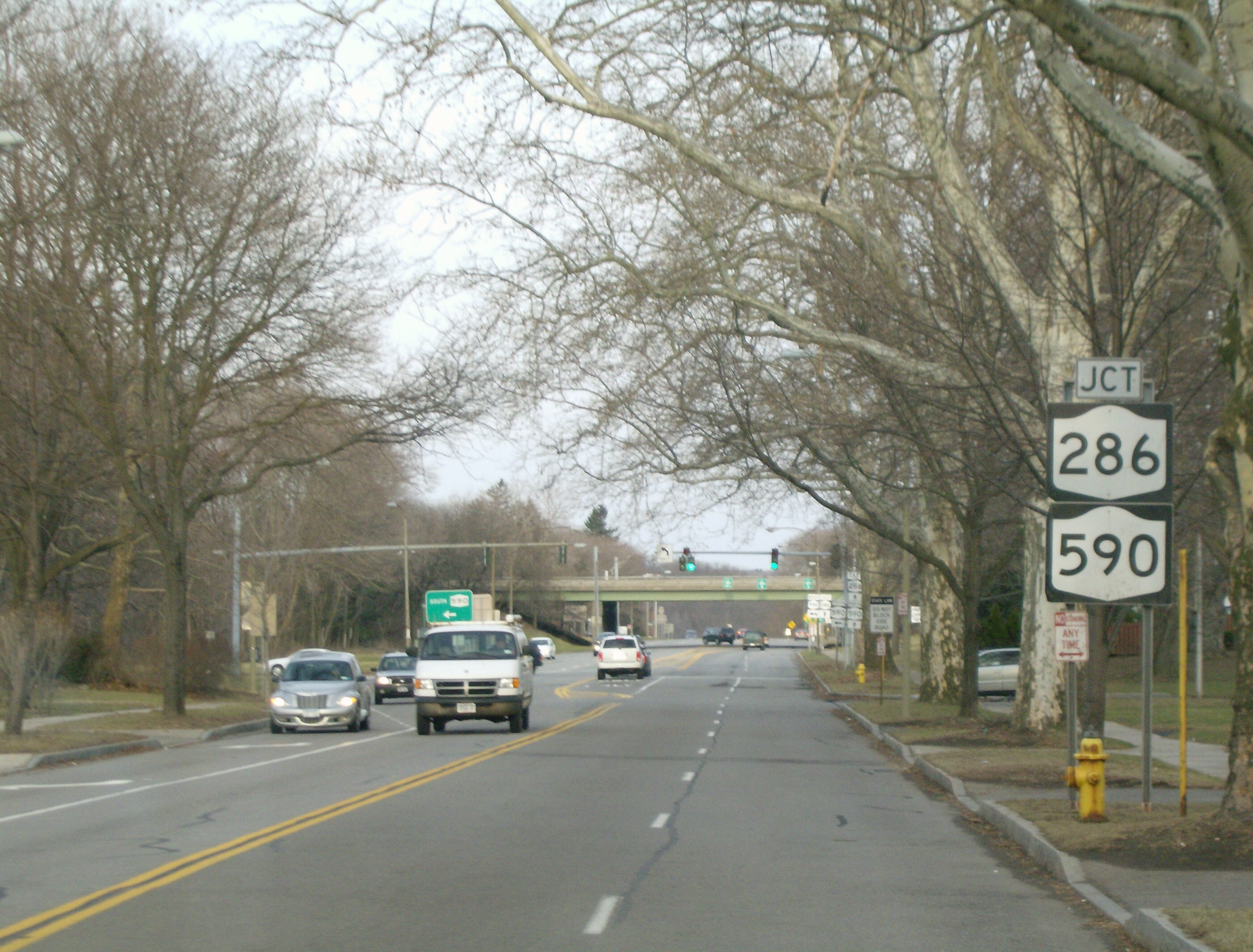
Approaching the western terminus of NY 286 on Browncroft Boulevard eastbound

The two highways loosely parallel each other southeastward for 0.75 miles (1.21 km) to White Village Drive, a residential side street branching off Browncroft Boulevard. Here, Old Browncroft Boulevard ends and NY 286 narrows slightly to become a four-lane undivided highway. NY 286 continues eastward, leaving the Ellison Park area and intersecting Blossom Road. East of this junction, NY 286 takes on a linear east–west routing as it becomes Atlantic Avenue at a junction with Qualtrough and Clark Roads. The residential nature of the roadway largely ends at Five Mile Line Road, where the homes that have lined the roadway become more sporadic and give way to open, cultivated fields. NY 286 has a slight s-curve between Five Mile Line and Baird Roads before reverting to its true eastward alignment prior to intersecting NY 250.

Past NY 250, the route continues to the east toward the Monroe–Wayne county line. Just before crossing into Wayne County, NY 286 curves slightly to the northeast. On the other side of the county line in Walworth, NY 286 turns back to the east at a junction with County Line Road, which is actually located 0.3 miles (0.5 km) east of the official border. Farther east, NY 286 intersects several local major arterials, including West Walworth Road and Canandaigua Road, as it heads over several small hills and passes through a mixture of open fields and forested areas. NY 286 and Atlantic Avenue both come to an end at an intersection with NY 350. The portion of NY 286 in Wayne County is maintained by the county as County Route 203.

== History ==
New York State Route 286A
- Location: Rochester–Penfield
- Existed: 1949–1970s

In the 1930 renumbering of state highways in New York, NY 35 was extended northeast from Canawaugus (west of the village of Avon) to Ontario by way of Scottsville, Rochester, and Walworth. NY 35 entered Rochester on Scottsville Road and followed Genesee and Main streets through the city. At the east end of Main Street, NY 35 turned south and followed Winton Road to Blossom Road. It curved eastward here to follow Blossom Road east to Browncroft Boulevard in Penfield. At some point between 1934 and 1938, an alternate route of NY 35 along the portion of Browncroft Boulevard between Winton and Blossom Roads was designated NY 35B.

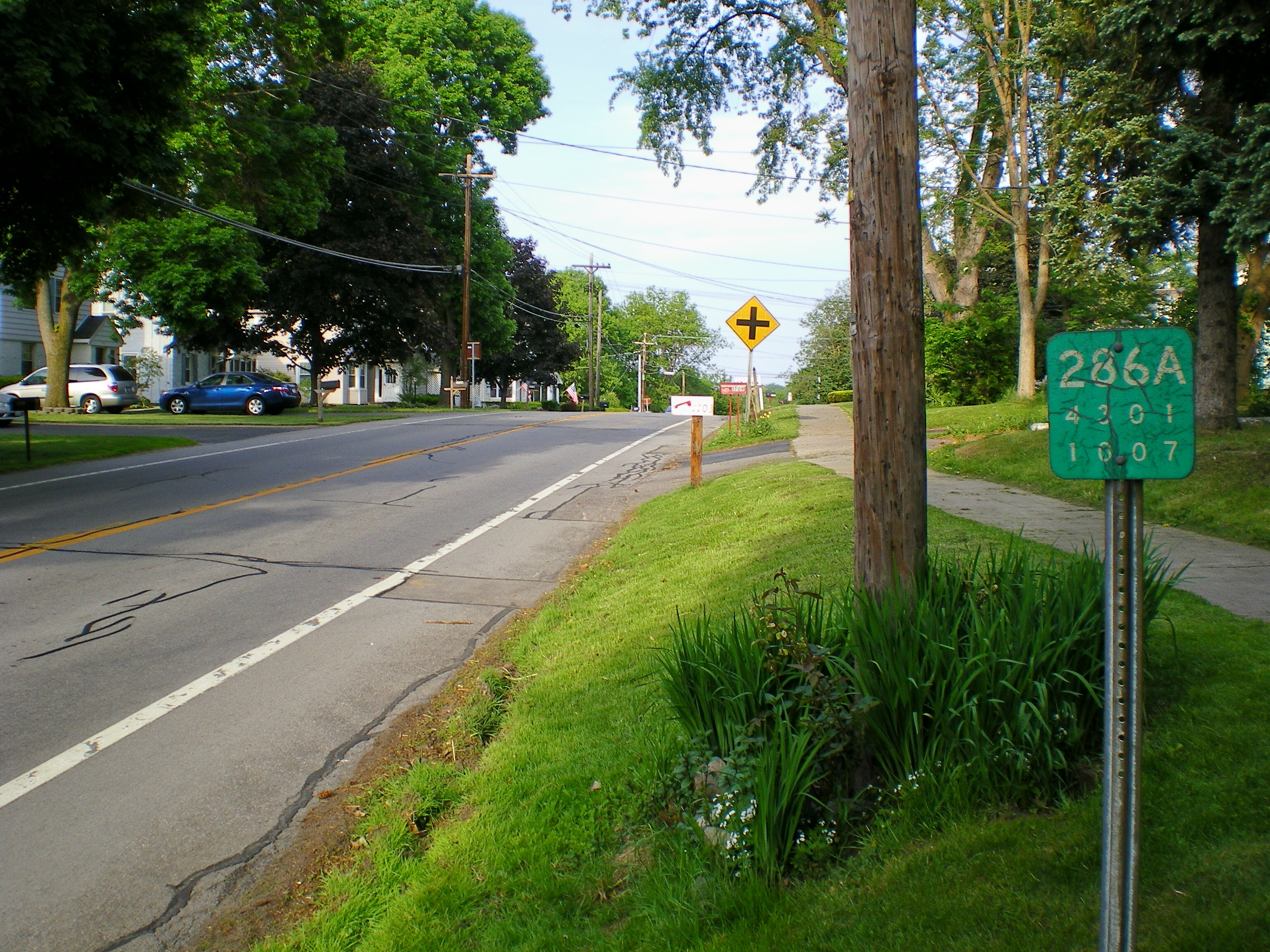
Reference marker for NY 286A on Blossom Road in Brighton

The NY 35 designation remained in place until the early 1940s when it was split into two designations: NY 383 west of Walworth and NY 350 from Walworth to Ontario. As part of the change, NY 35B was renumbered to NY 383B. NY 383 itself was altered on January 1, 1949, to end in downtown Rochester. The former routing of NY 383 between East Avenue (NY 96) in Rochester and NY 350 in Walworth became NY 286 while NY 383B was redesignated as NY 286A.

The portion of the Sea Breeze Expressway between Empire Boulevard (at the time U.S. Route 104 and now NY 404) and Interstate 490 opened to traffic c. 1961. Both NY 286 and NY 286A were truncated to begin at their interchanges with the expressway. In Wayne County, the routing of NY 286 was altered slightly in the vicinity of the county line. It originally veered onto what is now Knollwood Drive and followed Knollwood Drive and County Line Road to where the latter met Atlantic Avenue. A new roadway was constructed during the mid-1960s that directly connected the two portions of Atlantic Avenue and bypassed County Line Road entirely and became part of a realigned NY 286 by 1968.

Browncroft Boulevard was upgraded into a four-lane divided highway between the Sea Breeze Expressway (NY 47) and Blossom Road during the mid-1960s. Some parts of the highway were upgraded on the spot; others were bypassed and are now known today as Old Browncroft Boulevard. As a result of the upgrade, the alignments of NY 286 and NY 286A west of Blossom Road were flipped, placing NY 286 on Browncroft Boulevard and NY 286A on Blossom Road. The NY 286A designation was removed in the early 1970s and replaced with NY 941V, an unsigned reference route 2.20 miles (3.54 km) in length. Reference markers along Blossom Road still read "286A".

== Major intersections ==
County	Location	mi	km	Destinations	Notes
Monroe	Rochester	0.00	0.00	NY 590 (Sea Breeze Expressway)	Western terminus; exit 7 on NY 590
Monroe	Penfield	1.84	2.96	Blossom Road (NY 941V west)	Former NY 286A
Monroe	Penfield	5.84	9.40	NY 250 (Fairport–Nine Mile Point Road)	
Wayne	Walworth	13.05	21.00	NY 350	Eastern terminus
1.000 mi = 1.609 km; 1.000 km = 0.621 mi

== See also ==
- List of county routes in Wayne County, New York
