= Can of Worms (interchange) =

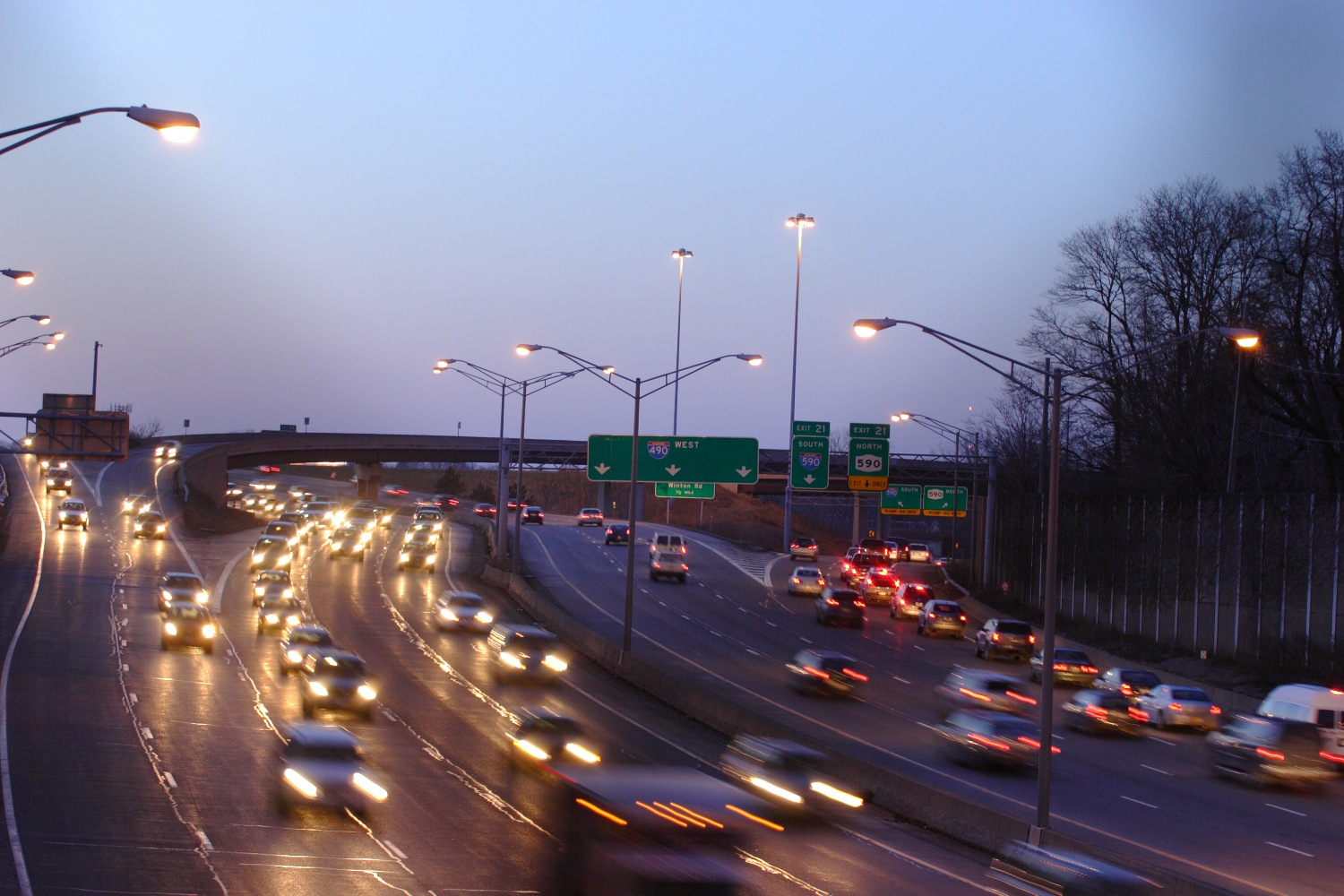
- I-490 westbound heading into the Can of Worms

Location
- Rochester, New York
- Coordinates: 43.143176°N 77.54734°W
- Roads at junction: I-490; I-590 / NY 590; NY 96

Construction
- Type: Free-flow interchange
- Constructed: late 1950s
- Opened: c. 1961
- Maintained by: New York State Department of Transportation

The Can of Worms is the local name for the intersection of Interstate 490 (I-490), I-590, New York State Route 590 (NY 590), NY 96 (East Avenue), and University Avenue on the east side of Rochester, New York, in the United States. The junction was built during the 1950s and 1960s as part of the Rochester Outer Loop's construction, and rebuilt in the late 1980s to eliminate weaving caused by the interchange's original design. Although the reconstruction eliminated many of the issues, the Can of Worms name stuck and is still used locally.

== Description ==
The Can of Worms is a modified double semi-directional T interchange that connects the east–west I-490 to I-590 south and NY 590 north. NY 590 and I-590 approach I-490 at points roughly 2,000 feet (610 m) apart, resulting in the unorthodox design of the junction. Other movements at the junction connect NY 96 to I-490 eastbound by way of a ramp immediately south of the main junction and link I-490 westbound to NY 96 by way of the adjacent exit 20, which utilizes University Avenue. The Can of Worms is exit 21 on I-490 and exit 5 on I-590 and NY 590.

The interchange is bounded on all sides by commercial and residential developments in the town of Brighton to the east and the city of Rochester to the west. Additionally, the CSX Transportation-owned Rochester Subdivision railroad line traverses the northern half of the interchange, passing over NY 590 and the onramp linking I-490 westbound to NY 590 northbound and under the flyover that connects NY 590 south to I-490. NY 96, meanwhile, goes through the center of the junction, crossing over I-590 but passing under I-490.

== History ==
I-490, then known as the Eastern Expressway, was built across eastern Monroe County in the late 1950s. At the same time, the Sea Breeze Expressway was constructed southward from Irondequoit to meet the Eastern Expressway in Rochester. The Sea Breeze Expressway and I-490 were connected c. 1961 by way of a directional T interchange. Another directional T interchange was built c. 1965 on the western edge of the first to connect I-490 to a new freeway leading to Brighton (now I-590). Local legend relates that on viewing the plans for the combined interchanges, an engineer named Stanley Kozak was heard to exclaim "It's like a can of worms!". The term came into common use, probably via local media, and eventually was marked on local streetmaps.

Due to the close proximity of the two junctions, traffic proceeding east–west on I-490 was required to merge across traffic coming off of NY 47 (later redesignated as I-590 and NY 590) in a reduced 40-mile-per-hour (64 km/h) speed zone in order to continue on the same highway. In an effort to resolve this issue, the intersection was rebuilt from 1988 to 1991 in a project costing $100 million. The new design eliminated weaving on I-490 and created a dedicated roadway for traffic traveling onto I-590 from NY 590 and vice versa.

In the years since the reconstruction, the Can of Worms name has remained in local parlance, typically as a descriptor for the modern junction during traffic reports. The name is also invoked when other traffic issues in the area are discussed in the local media—such as a lane re-striping on NY 590 in Irondequoit that generated a significant amount of controversy in 2010—a reference to the problems that once plagued the 490/590 interchange.

== See also ==
- Big Dig
- Spaghetti Junction
