= Cobbs Hill Reservoir =

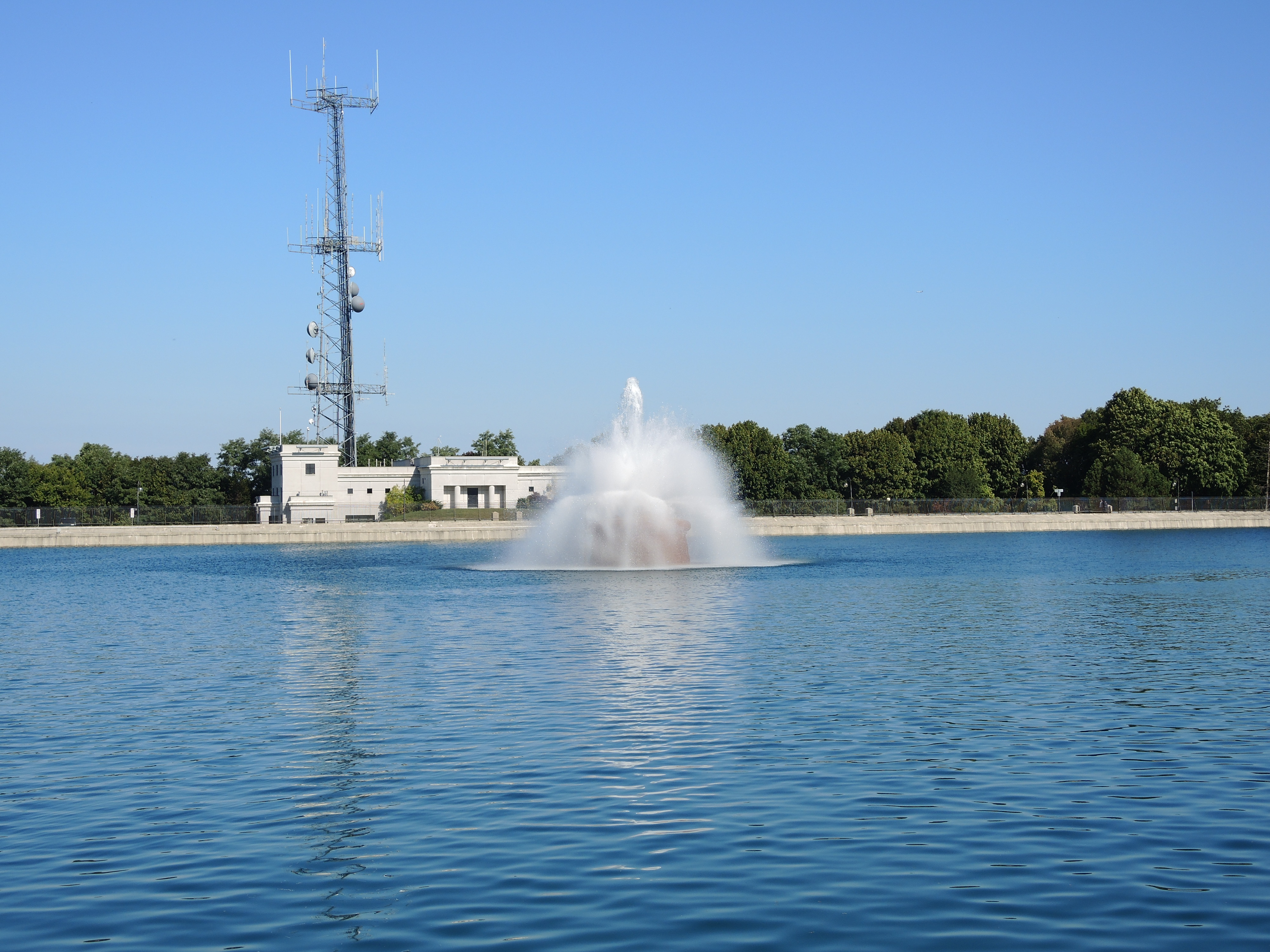

- Location within New York Location within the United States
- Location: Rochester, Monroe County, New York
- Coordinates: 43°08′19″N 77°34′18″W
- Type: Reservoir
- Basin countries: United States
- Surface area: 18 acres (73,000 m^{2})
- Water volume: 144,000,000 U.S. gallons (550,000 m^{3})
- Surface elevation: 633 ft (193 m)

Cobbs Hill Reservoir is a reservoir located in Cobbs Hill Park in Rochester, New York, United States. Completed in 1908, the reservoir has a capacity of 144,000,000 US gallons (550,000 m^{3}) and supplies drinking water to the city of Rochester. Source water comes from Hemlock Lake and Canadice Lake, approximately 30 miles (48 km) south of Rochester and 400 feet (120 m) higher in elevation, treated at the Hemlock Water Filtration Plant and gravity-fed to the reservoir via Rush Reservoir. The reservoir has been designated an American Water Landmark by the American Water Works Association.

== History ==
=== Land acquisition ===
In 1904, the City of Rochester purchased the hilltop of Cobbs Hill, the site of a former quarry, for the construction of a water reservoir. The hill takes its name from the Cobb family, early landowners in the area; a 1978 City of Rochester historical marker identifies Gideon Cobb (1791–1864) as a pioneer landowner, tavern keeper, and brickmaker who lived at the southeast corner of Monroe and Highland Avenues. George Eastman subsequently donated approximately 15 acres (61,000 m^{2}) at the hilltop to the city for park purposes, with the condition that the city acquire the adjoining Eastern Widewaters tract that had been part of the Erie Canal.

=== Construction and design ===
Construction of the reservoir began in 1905 and was completed in 1908, creating the city's second major distribution reservoir alongside the existing facilities at Rush and Highland. The Olmsted Brothers firm was engaged to design the reservoir grounds, including its entrances, related buildings, and the steep quarried slopes on either side of the basin; the firm also determined which tree species would best stabilize the slopes resulting from earlier quarrying. The granite gatehouse atop the hill was designed by architect J. Foster Warner in the Greek Revival style, featuring a wide portico with an ornate drinking fountain. The reservoir grounds were enclosed with iron fencing and lamp posts.

The smaller Lake Riley, located north of the reservoir, was originally part of the Erie Canal system. Interstate 490 now runs along the former canal bed in this area.

=== Later developments ===
During the New Deal, a refectory with a cafeteria and observation deck was constructed on the hilltop, funded by federal relief programs. The refectory attracted thousands of visitors annually and featured a beacon that helped guide aircraft to the Greater Rochester International Airport. In 1950, the refectory was replaced by a police, fire, and radio building, to which a garage and enlarged parking area were added in 1965.

In September 2025, the Rochester City Council unanimously approved the creation of the Cobbs Hill Park Preservation District, encompassing approximately 132 acres (530,000 m^{2}) and including both the park and Washington Grove. It was the first new historic preservation district established in Rochester in 32 years.

== Water supply ==
Cobbs Hill Reservoir is one of three finished drinking water reservoirs maintained by the City of Rochester, along with Rush Reservoir and Highland Reservoir. Source water from Hemlock and Canadice Lakes is treated at the Hemlock Water Filtration Plant and gravity-fed through a series of conduits to Rush Reservoir and on to Cobbs Hill and Highland for distribution. As an uncovered finished water storage facility, the reservoir is required to comply with the EPA's Long Term 2 Enhanced Surface Water Treatment Rule (LT2) by November 2035.

== Current use ==
A 0.7-mile (1.1 km) paved loop path around the reservoir is popular for walking and running and offers panoramic views of the Rochester skyline. Cobbs Hill Park as a whole encompasses 109 acres (440,000 m^{2}) and includes athletic fields, tennis and basketball courts, Lake Riley, and Washington Grove, a 26-acre (110,000 m^{2}) old-growth oak–hickory forest.

== See also ==
- American and Canadian Water Landmark
- Cobbs Hill Park
