= New York State Route 590 =

State highway in Monroe County, New York, US

New York State Route 590
- Sea Breeze Expressway
- Map of Rochester with NY 590 highlighted in red, former section in blue

Route information
- Maintained by NYSDOT
- Length: 4.98 mi (8.01 km)
- Existed: March 18, 1980–present

Major junctions
- South end: I-490 / I-590 in Rochester
- NY 104 in Irondequoit
- North end: Titus Avenue / Sea Breeze Drive in Irondequoit

Location
- Country: United States
- State: New York
- Counties: Monroe

Highway system
- New York Highways; Interstate; US; State; Reference; Parkways
← I-590	→ NY 598

New York State Route 590 (NY 590) is a 4.98-mile (8.01 km) north–south freeway located in the eastern suburbs of Rochester, New York, in the United States. The route is a northward extension of Interstate 590 (I-590) that begins at the Can of Worms, an interchange between I-490, I-590, and NY 590 on the boundary between the town of Brighton and the city of Rochester, and ends at a roundabout with Titus Avenue in the town of Irondequoit. NY 590 is known as the Sea Breeze Expressway, a name derived from the small community of Sea Breeze located near the highway's former northern terminus at Culver Road near the southern shore of Lake Ontario.

The portion of NY 590 between the Can of Worms and NY 104 is part of the northeastern quadrant of the Rochester Outer Loop, a series of freeways that form a beltway around the city of Rochester. At NY 104, the Outer Loop turns west to follow NY 104 through Irondequoit. The Sea Breeze Expressway was built in stages from the 1950s to the 1960s and carried various designations until 1970, when the entirety of the Rochester – Sea Breeze highway was designated as part of NY 47. It was redesignated as NY 590 in 1980. In the late 2000s, the section of NY 590 north of Titus Avenue was reconfigured into a two-lane road named Sea Breeze Drive, and NY 590 was truncated to end at Titus Avenue.

== Route description ==
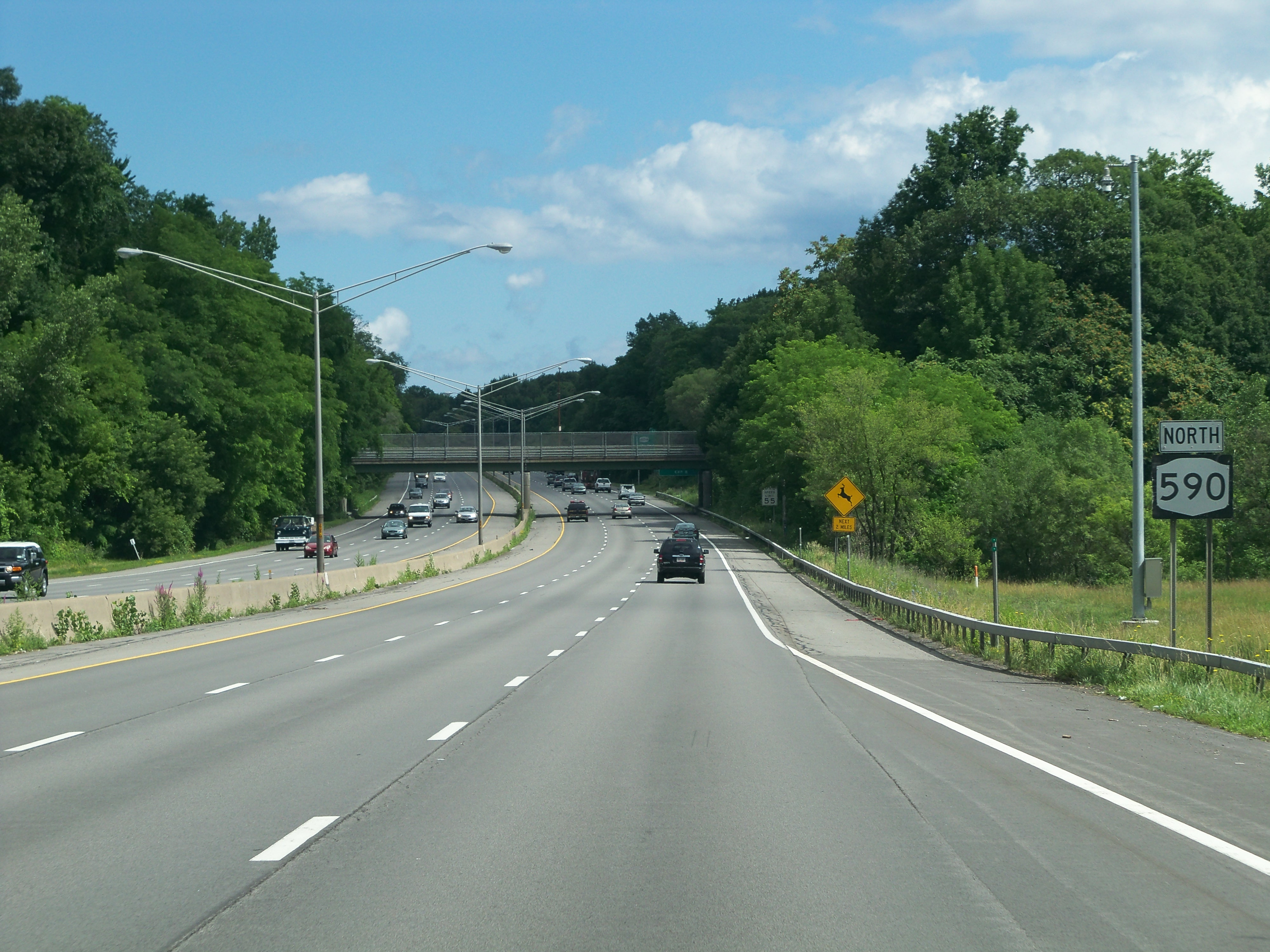
Just north of NY 286 on NY 590 northbound in Rochester

The four-lane I-590 becomes NY 590 upon passing under I-490 at the Can of Worms on the eastern edge of Rochester. It heads northeast into Brighton and through the remainder of the interchange, passing under the ramp connecting I-490 west to I-590 south, the CSX Transportation-owned Rochester Subdivision, and the ramps from NY 590 south to I-490 in succession before widening to six lanes and turning northward ahead of a diamond interchange with Blossom Road, once designated as NY 286A. Between Blossom Road and NY 286 (Browncroft Boulevard), NY 590 slowly turns to the northwest, passing through densely populated neighborhoods located adjacent to the Rochester–Brighton boundary. It reaches the city line and reenters Rochester upon meeting NY 286.

The lone portion of NY 590 within the city of Rochester runs due north–south, acting as a divider between residential neighborhoods to the west and the Irondequoit Creek valley (much of which is part of Ellison Park) to the east. Little more than a half mile after entering the city, NY 590 exits the city and enters the neighboring town of Irondequoit. Here, the freeway turns to the northwest to avoid the area surrounding the intersection of North Winton Road and NY 404 (Empire Boulevard). After passing under North Winton Road, NY 590 resumes its northward trek and connects to NY 404 by way of a modified cloverleaf interchange. The freeway continues onward, separating a large residential area from Irondequoit Bay Park West as it progresses toward a northbound-only exit with Norton Street. One half-mile to the north of Norton, NY 590 meets NY 104 via a large interchange.

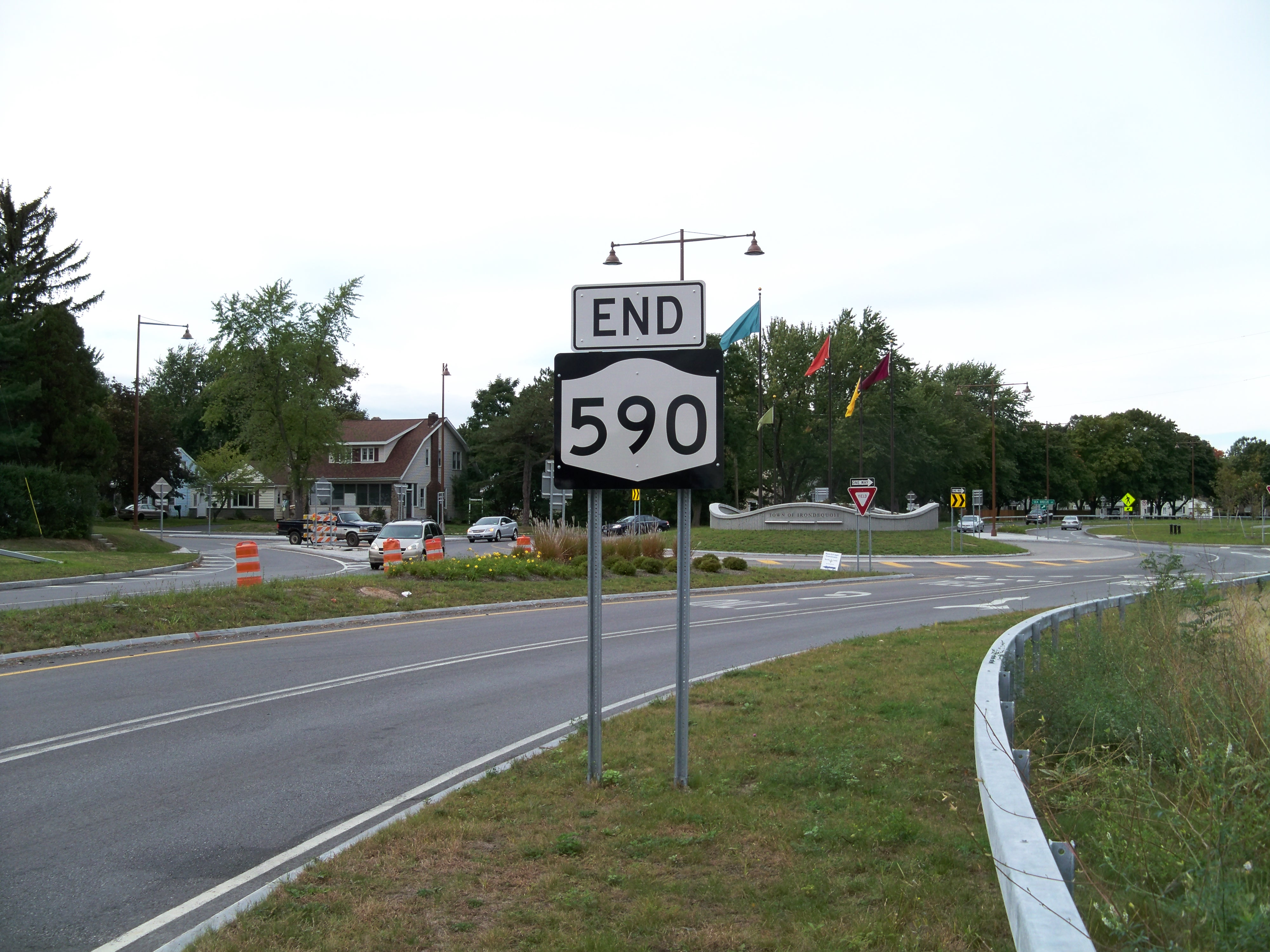
The current northern terminus of NY 590 at Titus Avenue

Due to the terrain surrounding the interchange and the location of the Irondequoit Bay Bridge, NY 104 is forced to run parallel to NY 590 for a short distance between the Keeler Street Expressway and NY 590's next exit, a diamond interchange connecting to East Ridge Road. Through this stretch, NY 590—now just four lanes wide—runs in between NY 104 westbound and NY 104 eastbound. At East Ridge Road, NY 104 turns to the northeast to cross Irondequoit Bay while NY 590 continues north through residential areas toward Sea Breeze. The road has a northbound at-grade intersection with Sunrise Crescent, a private residential street, before meeting Titus Avenue at a roundabout that serves as NY 590's northern terminus. Past this point, the right-of-way of NY 590 continues north to Culver Road at the Lake Ontario shoreline as a divided two-lane street named Sea Breeze Drive.

Traveling southbound on NY 590, two significant movements are restricted due to the composition of the freeway. One is at Blossom Road in Brighton, where traffic entering NY 590 southbound cannot access I-490 due to the location of the exit 5 (left exit) flyover, which begins north of the Blossom Road onramp. This movement was possible prior to the reconstruction of the Can of Worms, as the original connection point between the Sea Breeze Expressway and I-490 was south of the Blossom Road interchange. In Irondequoit, there are no southbound exits between East Ridge Road and NY 404; thus, there is no access to either NY 104 or Norton Street. An access road between NY 590 at Titus Avenue and the Irondequoit Bay Bridge was planned to provide access from NY 590 southbound to NY 104 eastbound and from NY 104 westbound to NY 590 northbound, but it was never completed.

== History ==
=== Construction and designation ===
The origins of NY 590 date back to the start of the 1950s when work first began on the Sea Breeze Expressway, a part-freeway, part expressway that extended from Rochester north to the Lake Ontario shoreline at Sea Breeze. The highway was built in stages from north to south, with the first section—a divided highway connecting Culver Road to East Ridge Road in Irondequoit—opening to traffic in the early 1950s as a realignment of NY 18. The northern end of the roadway was situated just west of the Irondequoit Bay outlet, where Irondequoit Bay meets Lake Ontario. Construction on the next segment, a limited-access extension south to Empire Boulevard (U.S. Route 104 or US 104), began in the mid-1950s. The new roadway was completed in the late 1950s, at which time it became part of a rerouted US 104.

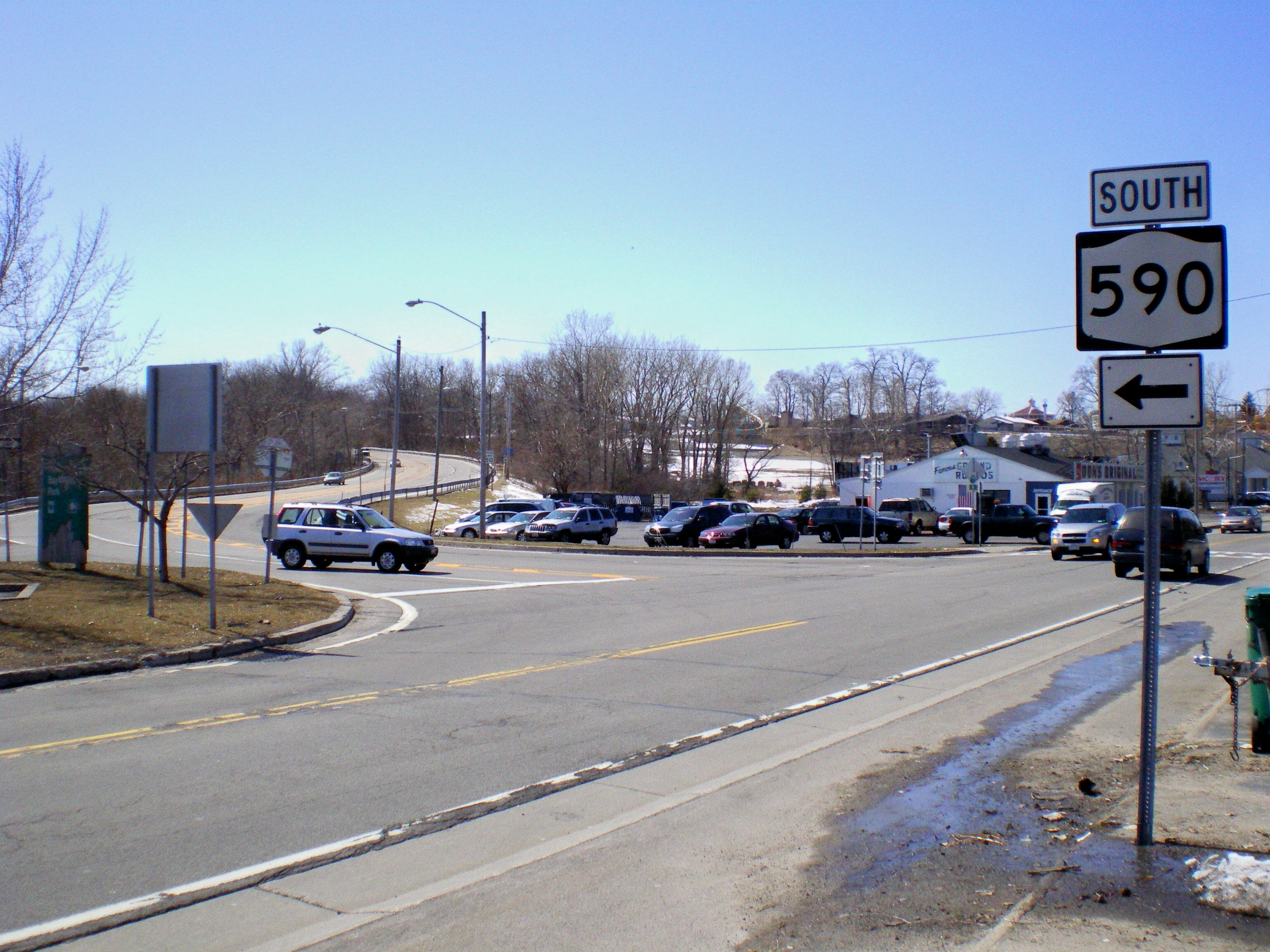
March 2008 photo of the original northern terminus of NY 590 at Culver Road

By 1960, construction was underway on the final piece, a second extension south to the Eastern Expressway (I-490) in eastern Rochester. The under-construction highway generally paralleled Winton Road, then designated as part of NY 47. The new extension was completed c. 1961, but went unnumbered until c. 1962 when NY 47 was realigned north of Blossom Road to follow the freeway north to the Empire Boulevard interchange, where it ended at US 104. The remainder of the Sea Breeze Expressway from I-490 to Blossom Road became part of NY 47 c. 1965 following the completion of what is now I-590 from the Can of Worms to Elmwood Avenue.

From 1970 to 1980, the Sea Breeze Expressway underwent a series of designation changes. On January 1, 1970, NY 47 was extended northward to encompass the entirety of the Sea Breeze Expressway. The change resulted in overlaps with US 104 from Empire Boulevard to the new Keeler Street Expressway, which was built south of Ridge Road in the late 1960s as a realignment of US 104, and NY 18 from East Ridge Road to Culver Road, from where NY 18 continued east along Lake Road to Webster. Both overlaps proved to be temporary: US 104 was realigned c. 1971 to cross Irondequoit Bay on the Irondequoit Bay Bridge while NY 18 was truncated c. 1973 to end in Rochester's Kodak Park.

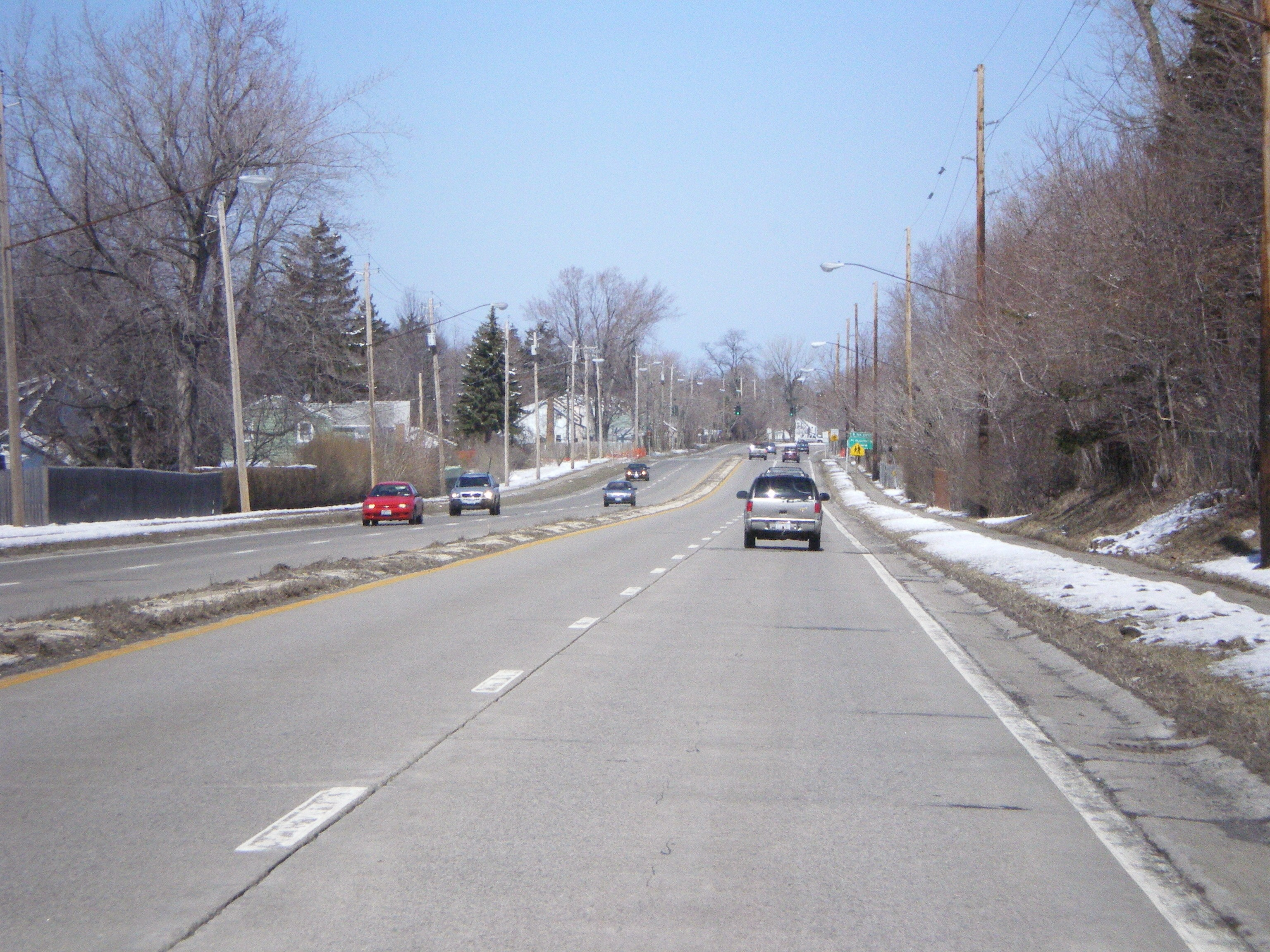
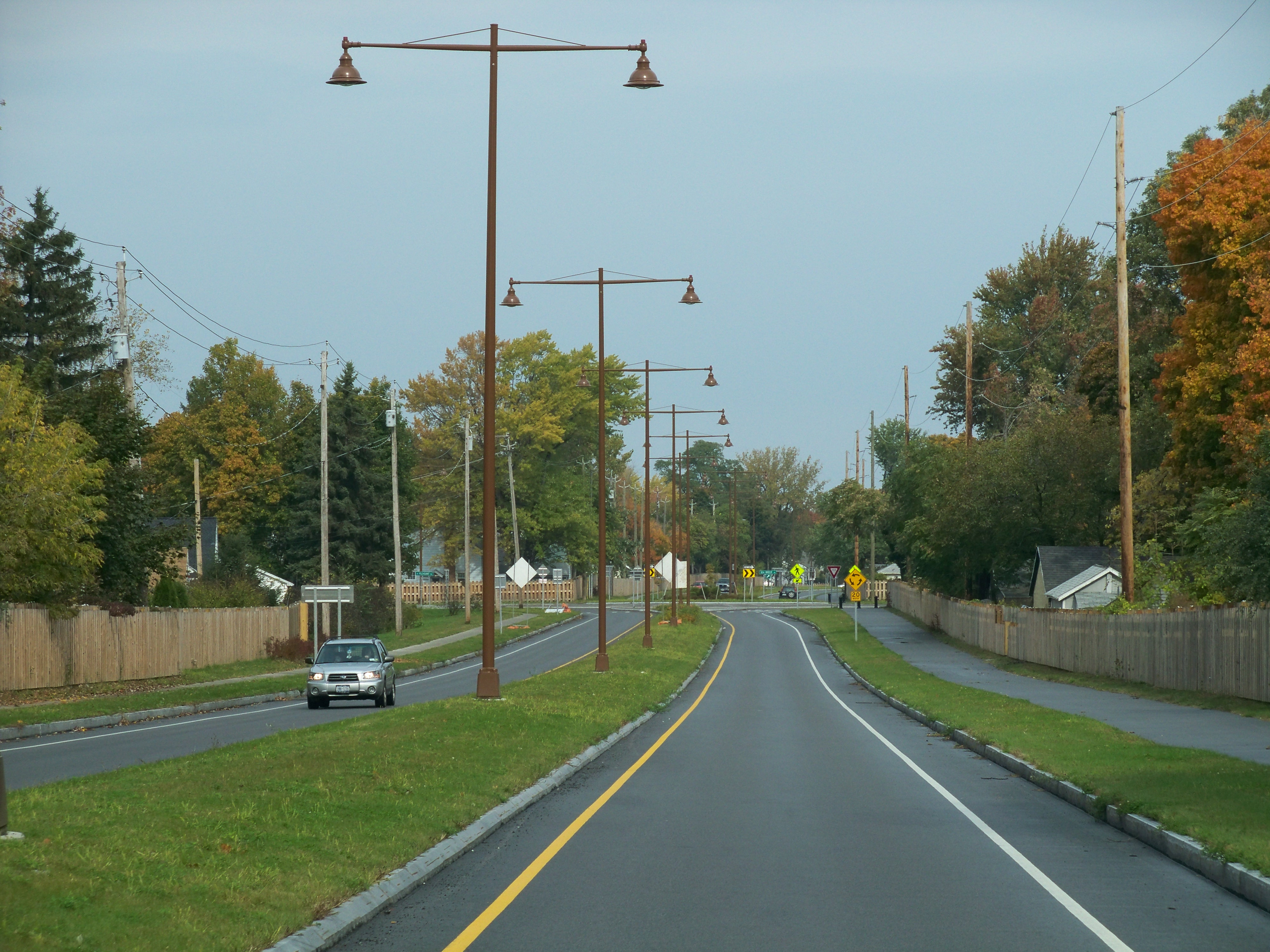
Approaching Point Pleasant Road in March 2008 (top on NY 590) and in October 2010 (bottom on Sea Breeze Drive).

In the late 1970s, the state of New York submitted a proposal to the American Association of State Highway and Transportation Officials that would substantially alter how the Outer Loop was numbered. As part of the plan, the NY 47 designation would be eliminated while most of the northeastern section of the Outer Loop—from I-490 in Rochester to NY 104 (former US 104) to Irondequoit—would become the northernmost part of I-590. A replacement designation for NY 47 north of NY 104 was not named at the time. Most of the proposed changes took effect on March 18, 1980, when NY 47 was eliminated; however, I-590 was modified to end at its junction with I-490. In its place, the Rochester–Irondequoit leg of the Outer Loop was assigned NY 590, which continued north to Sea Breeze over former NY 47.

=== Sea Breeze Drive ===
==== Project origins ====
In 1995, Irondequoit Town Supervisor David Schantz proposed the idea of converting the portion of NY 590 north of Titus Avenue into a parkway that would serve as a "gateway" into Irondequoit. He presented the idea to Jim Walsh, the United States Representative representing Irondequoit, who later secured $8 million from the federal government for the project. Another $4.5 million of funding was also devoted to the project from the state of New York. Planning for the project began in mid-2004. In late 2006, the Irondeqout Town Board chose a configuration calling for the number of lanes on NY 590 to be reduced to two and for four intersections to be replaced with roundabouts as its "preferred alternative".

The final project design was presented on February 6, 2008, in the last of five public meetings on the project. Under the plan, the section of NY 590 north of Titus Avenue would be reduced to a two-lane, 45-mile-per-hour (72 km/h) parkway and named "Sea Breeze Drive". Its signalized intersections with Titus Avenue, Durand Boulevard, and Seneca and Point Pleasant Roads would be converted into roundabouts as part of the reconstruction. Also, the portion of NY 590 north of Durand Boulevard would be realigned to meet Culver Road at a new intersection farther west along the lakeshore. The realignment would open up 3 acres (1.2 ha) of waterfront land along the shore of Irondequoit Bay that had previously been occupied by the freeway. The town of Irondequoit would then acquire the former right-of-way of NY 590 from the state of New York for future recreational uses in a transaction that would officially cost the town $1.

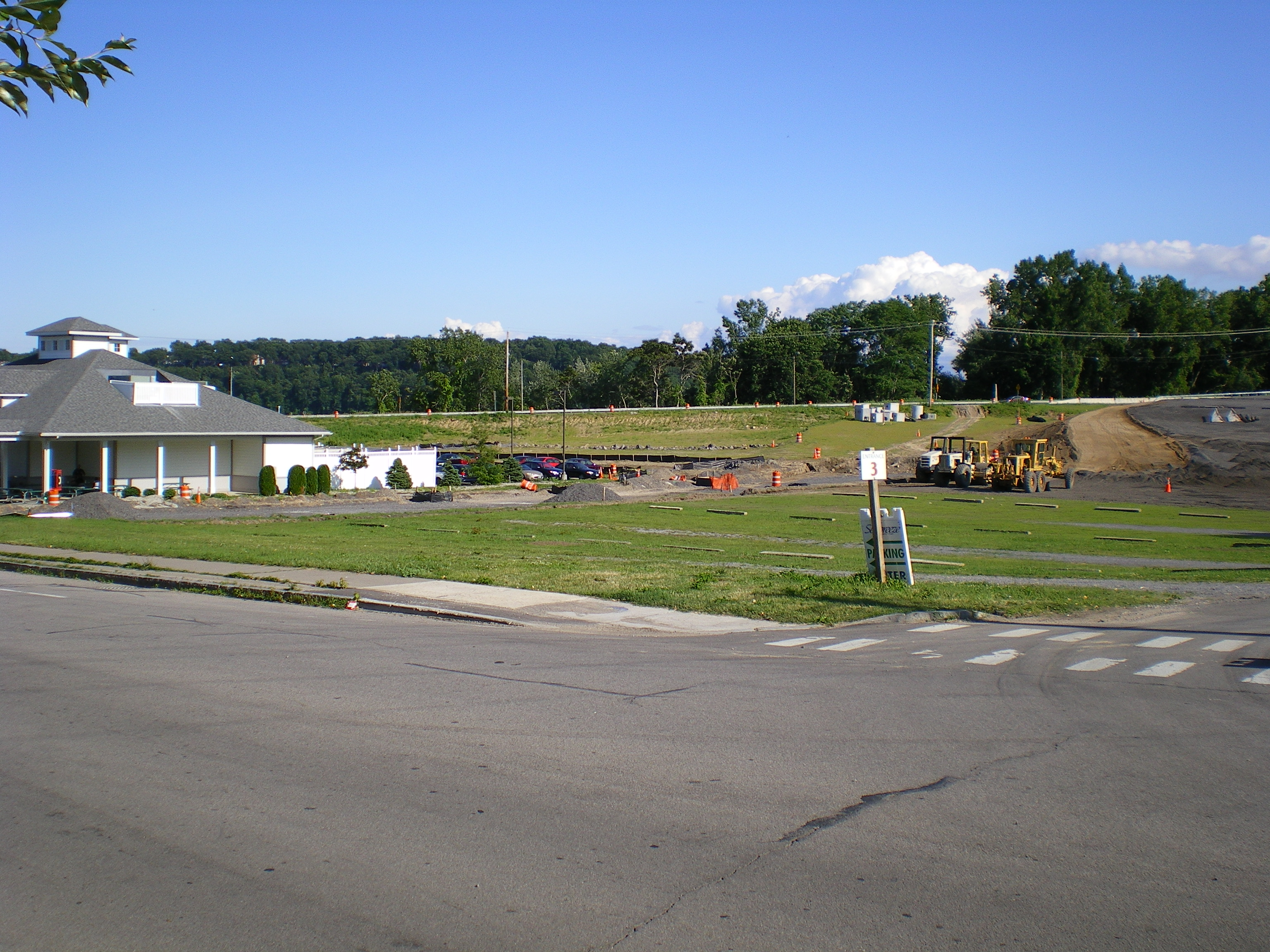
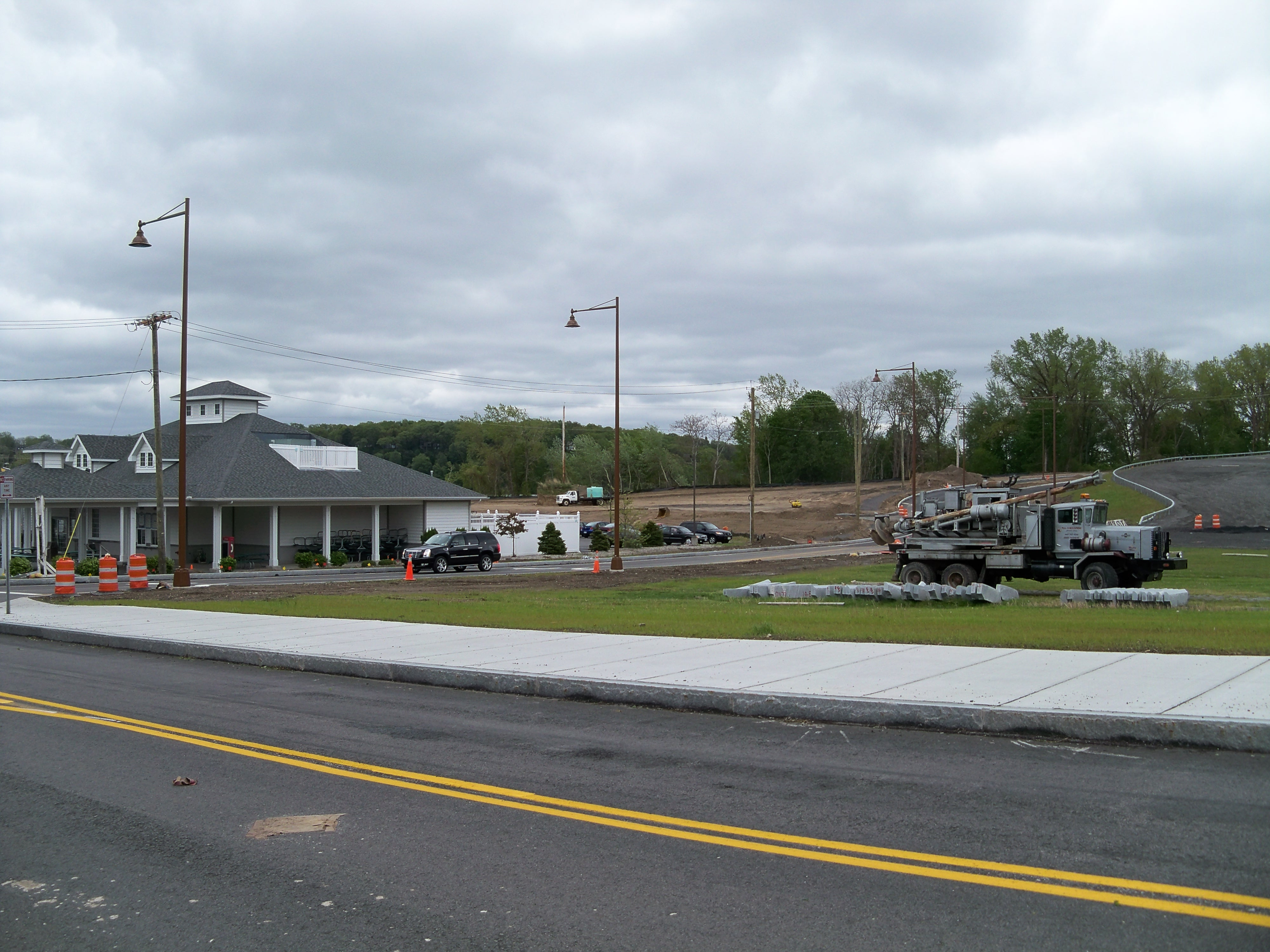
The new alignment of Sea Breeze Drive, in July 2009 (top) and May 2010 (bottom), looking south-southeast from Culver Road. The existing NY 590 alignment is in the background.

Public opinion on the proposed project was split. Many residents supported the project, stating it would improve the safety of the highway; however, others believed that the reduction in lanes would result in increased traffic on Culver Road, which runs parallel to NY 590 through Irondequoit, and that the roundabouts would make navigating the highway difficult.

==== Construction ====
On July 15, 2008, the town of Irondequoit let a $12.8 million contract for the Sea Breeze Drive project, a mark that was within the $14 million accumulated in funding by this time. Ground was officially broken on the project on July 28 as part of a ceremony attended by several Rochester-area dignitaries. Among those present were Jim Walsh and David Schantz, both of whom played large roles in making the project a reality. The corridor was subsequently reduced to two lanes as the southbound lanes of NY 590 were reconfigured to handle both directions of traffic while work ensued on permanently narrowing the northbound lanes to a single lane. Northbound traffic on NY 590 was realigned to use the new northbound lane on August 17, 2009.

The first two of the roundabouts to reach operational status were those at Point Pleasant Road and Durand Boulevard. The Point Pleasant Road roundabout opened to traffic on September 8, 2009, by which time the Durand Boulevard roundabout was also ready for use. The Titus Avenue roundabout was completed in late 2009, while work on the Seneca Road junction was delayed until October 2009 due to the proximity of the intersection to the side of the hill overlooking Irondequoit Bay. Although the original plans for the project had already accounted for the issue, the plans had to be revised to comply with new federal standards regarding the use of steel pilings for supporting the hillside. Work on the roundabout finally began on October 12. The Seneca Road roundabout and the new alignment of Sea Breeze Drive north of Durand Boulevard were completed in the first half of 2010.

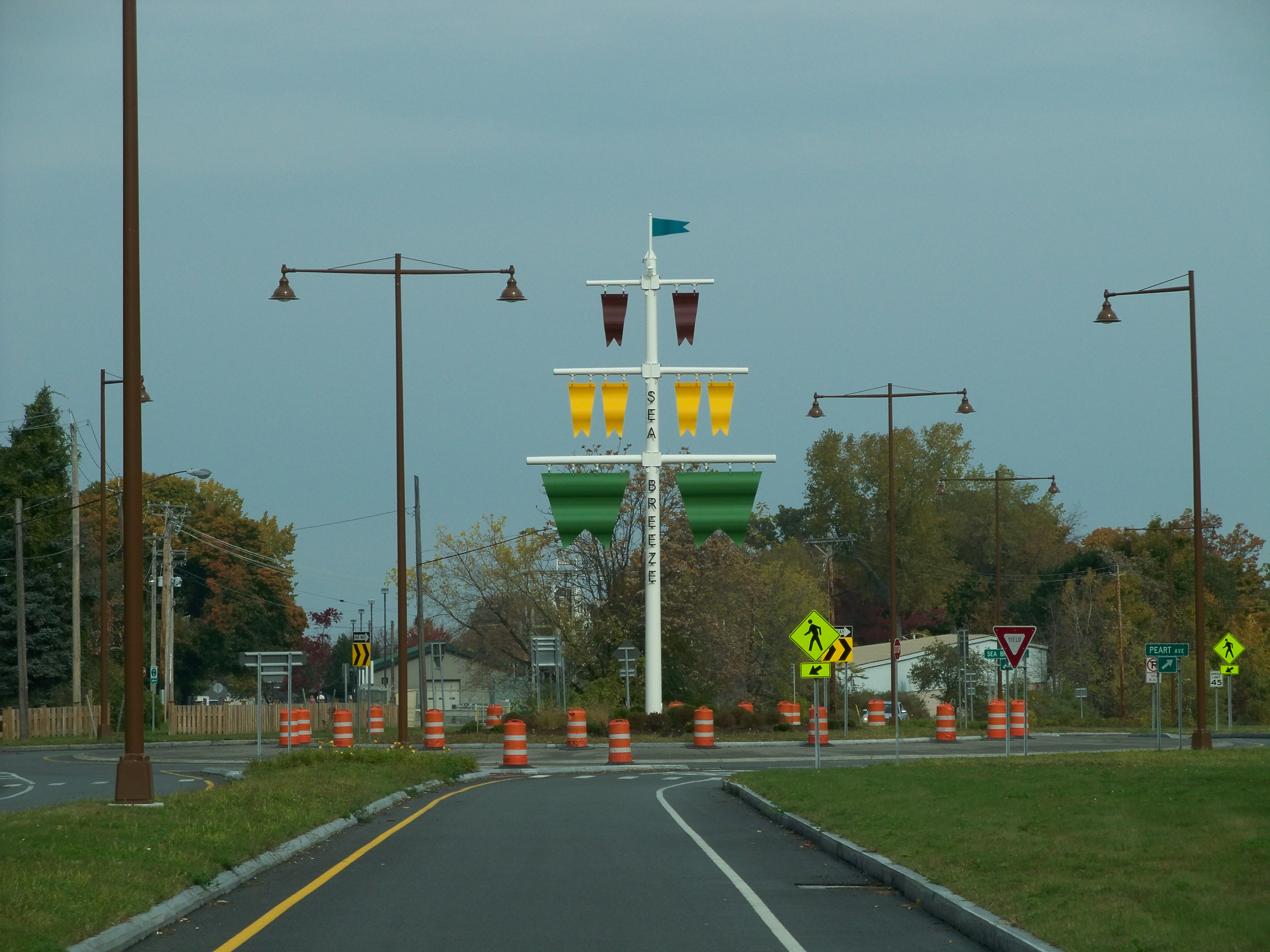
Sea Breeze Drive at Durand Boulevard

The completion date for the project, dubbed "the largest public works project ever done in the town of Irondequoit" by then-Town Supervisor Mary Ellen Heyman, was pushed back several times. It was originally set for May 2010, but was subsequently pushed back to late August or early September. It was finally completed in October 2010 with the installation of a decorative ship mast structure at the Durand Boulevard roundabout. Following the project's completion, NY 590 was truncated to Titus Avenue and ownership and maintenance of Sea Breeze Drive was transferred to the town of Irondequoit. According to New York State Department of Transportation (NYSDOT) official Rick Papaj, the state turned Sea Breeze Drive over to the town because the portion of NY 590 north of Titus Avenue had low traffic volumes and was situated in a residential area. Papaj added, "[the portion of NY 590 north of Titus Avenue] didn't make sense (to us) anymore. 590 effectively ends at Route 104."

== Exit list ==
Exit numbers continue sequentially from those of Interstate 590. The entire route is in Monroe County.

Location	mi	km	Exit	Destinations	Notes
Rochester	0.00	0.00	–	I-590 south	Continuation south
Rochester	0.00	0.00	5	I-490 – Downtown Rochester, Victor	Can of Worms Interchange; exit 21 on I-490
Brighton	0.33	0.53	6	Blossom Road (NY 941V east) – Ellison Park	Former NY 286A
Brighton–Rochester line	1.16	1.87	7	NY 286 east (Browncroft Boulevard)	Western terminus of NY 286
Irondequoit	2.52	4.06	8	NY 404 east (Empire Boulevard) – Webster	Western terminus of NY 404; former US 104
Irondequoit	3.33	5.36	9	Norton Street / Bayview Road	Northbound exit and southbound entrance
Irondequoit	4.02	6.47	10	NY 104 – Webster, Greece	Northbound exit and southbound entrance; signed as exits 10A (west) and 10B (east); former US 104
Irondequoit	4.48	7.21	11	Ridge Road	
Irondequoit	4.70	7.56	–	Orland Road	Southbound exit and entrance
Irondequoit	4.98	8.01	–	Titus Avenue / Sea Breeze Drive	Northern terminus; roundabout
1.000 mi = 1.609 km; 1.000 km = 0.621 mi: Incomplete access

== See also ==
- Interstate 590 for exits 1–4
