= New York State Route 204 =

State highway in Monroe County, New York, US

New York State Route 204
- Airport Expressway
- Map of Rochester with NY 204 highlighted in red

Route information
- Maintained by NYSDOT
- Length: 3.25 mi (5.23 km)
- Existed: c. 1965–present

Major junctions
- West end: I-490 in Gates
- East end: I-390 in Gates

Location
- Country: United States
- State: New York
- Counties: Monroe

Highway system
- New York Highways; Interstate; US; State; Reference; Parkways
| ← NY 203 | → NY 205 |

New York State Route 204 (NY 204) is an east–west state highway located just southwest of Rochester in Monroe County, New York, in the United States. The western terminus of the route is at exit 6 on Interstate 490 (I-490) in Gates. Its eastern terminus is at I-390 exit 18. The western portion of NY 204 is a freeway known as the Airport Expressway that indirectly connects I-490 to the Greater Rochester International Airport. The remaining part of the connection is made by an at-grade portion of NY 204 on Chili (NY 33A) and Brooks Avenues. NY 204 was assigned c. 1965 from I-490 to the Rochester city line in Gates, however the section between I-390 and the city line was removed by January 2017.

== Route description ==
NY 204 begins at I-490 exit 6 in Gates. The route heads southeast along the Airport Expressway, a four-lane freeway through the town of Gates. No exits exist along the freeway; in fact, it only comes in contact with one highway (Pixley Road, which it passes over). After 1 mile (1.6 km), the freeway ends at NY 33A (Chili Avenue). NY 204 turns east here, joining NY 33A northeast for 0.9 miles (1.4 km) to the heavily commercial hamlet of Tressmar. The routes split near Westgate Plaza, where NY 204 veers eastward onto Brooks Avenue.

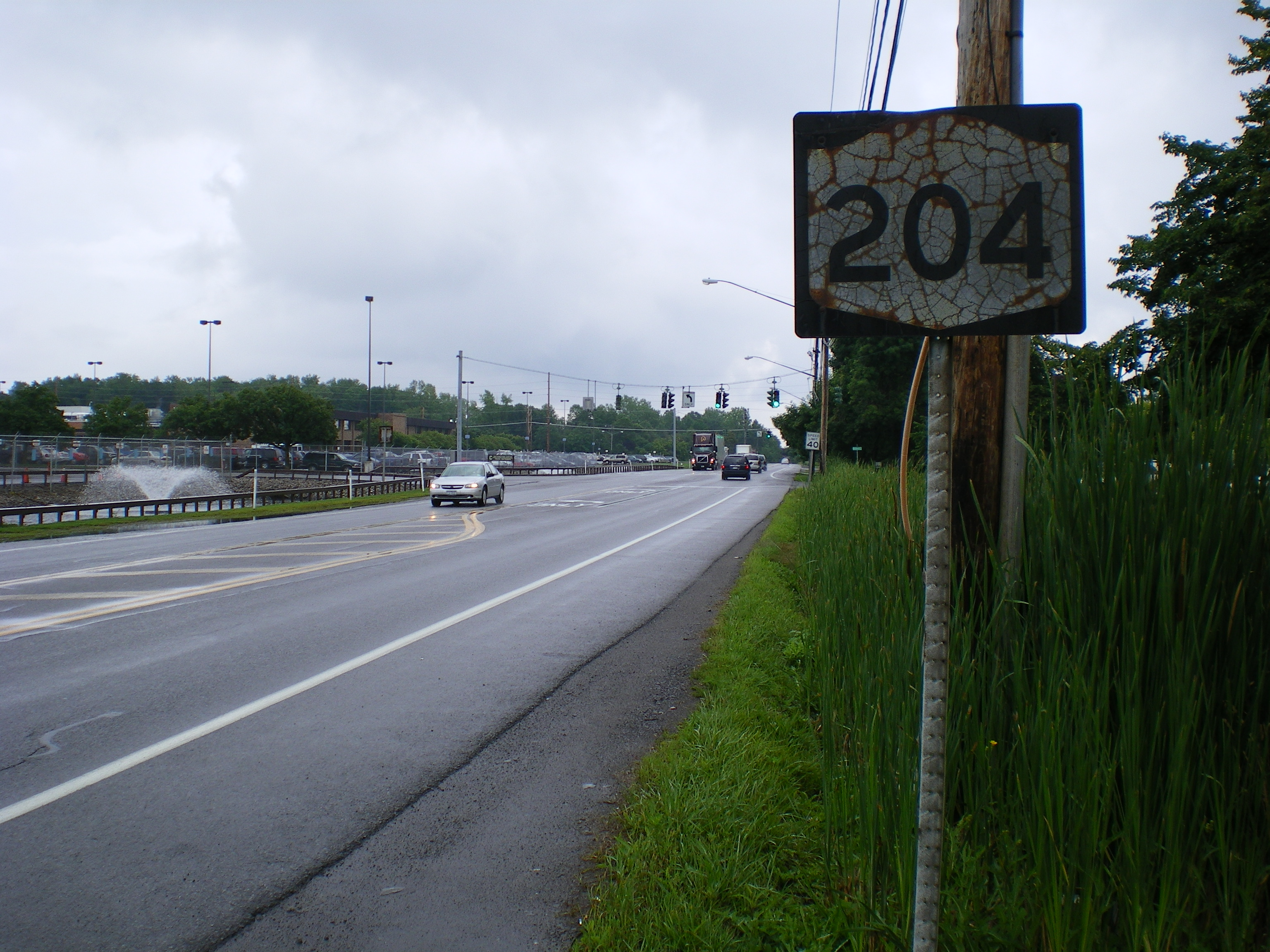
Old shield on NY 204 eastbound near the Wegmans offices

The route heads through a small residential neighborhood on the outskirts of Tressmar, which then gives way to more commercial and industrial surroundings. Along this stretch, NY 204 passes the headquarters of Wegmans Food Markets. Past the Wegmans offices, the road dips sharply in elevation to pass under the Rochester and Southern Railroad. NY 204 gradually returns to its prior elevation east of the railroad and connects to Airport Way, the primary access road to the Greater Rochester International Airport, by way of an interchange. The highway runs along the northern edge of the airport grounds toward the Erie Canal, where it meets I-390 at exit 18 on the southern bank of the waterway, the eastern end of NY 204.

== History ==
The portion of Brooks Avenue from Howard Road in Gates to Genesee Park Boulevard in Rochester was originally designated as part of NY 47 between 1935 and 1938. When NY 47 was rerouted to follow Beahan Road and Scottsville Road between Howard Road and Elmwood Avenue c. 1962, the former alignment of NY 47 on Brooks Avenue and Genesee Park Boulevard was redesignated NY 33B. The NY 33B designation was removed and reapplied to a new highway in the Buffalo area c. 1965. The portion of NY 33B west of the Rochester city line was redesignated as NY 204.

To the west of Brooks Avenue, construction began in the mid-1960s on the Airport Expressway, a limited-access highway between I-490 and NY 33A (Chili Avenue) near the Gates–Chili town line. The highway was opened to traffic and designated as an extension of NY 204 by 1968. In between the end of the expressway and Brooks Avenue, NY 204 overlapped with NY 33A. As planned, the Airport Expressway would be extended eastward along the Brooks Avenue corridor to meet the Rochester Outer Loop (NY 47) just north of the then-Rochester–Monroe County Airport. On January 1, 1970, the NY 204 designation was officially extended eastward along the proposed highway; however, in the field, NY 204 remained routed on Chili and Brooks Avenues.

The proposed extension of the Airport Expressway remained on maps as late as 1979; however, by 1981, the routing was demapped as the planned extension was cancelled after opposition from area residents. The intersection between the Airport Expressway and NY 33A was a stub half-interchange until 2001, and rebuilt as a traditional T-shaped intersection.

The extension of NY 204 in Gates east of I-390 was removed from the state highway system by 2017.

== Major intersections ==
The entire route is in Gates, Monroe County.

| mi | km | Destinations | Notes |
|---|---|---|---|
| 0.00 | 0.00 | I-490 – Buffalo, Rochester | Western terminus; exit 6 on I-490 |
| 1.04 | 1.67 | Eastern end of freeway section | |
| 1.04 | 1.67 | NY 33A west | Western end of NY 33A concurrency |
| 1.89 | 3.04 | NY 33A east | Eastern end of NY 33A concurrency |
| 3.25 | 5.23 | I-390 to I-90 Toll (New York Thruway) – Rochester | Eastern terminus; exit 18 on I-390 |
1.000 mi = 1.609 km; 1.000 km = 0.621 mi: Concurrency terminus
