= Interstate 590 =

Highway in New York

Interstate 590
- Rochester Outer Loop
- Map of Rochester with I-590 highlighted in red

Route information
- Auxiliary route of I-90
- Maintained by NYSDOT
- Length: 5.31 mi (8.55 km)
- Existed: March 18, 1980–present
- NHS: Entire route

Major junctions
- South end: I-390 in Brighton
- North end: I-490 / NY 590 in Rochester

Location
- Country: United States
- State: New York
- Counties: Monroe

Highway system
- Interstate Highway System; Main; Auxiliary; Suffixed; Business; Future; New York Highways; Interstate; US; State; Reference; Parkways
← I-587	→ NY 590

Interstate 590 (I-590) is a north–south auxiliary Interstate Highway that serves the immediate southeastern suburbs of the city of Rochester, New York, in the United States. It extends for 5.31 miles (8.55 km) from an interchange with I-390 in Brighton to the Can of Worms, a complex interchange connecting I-590 to I-490 (Eastern Expressway) just inside the Rochester city line. I-590 makes up the southeast quadrant of the Rochester Outer Loop, which continues west on I-390 and north past the Can of Worms on New York State Route 590 (NY 590). The highway is a spur route of I-90; the connection between the two is made via both I-390 and I-490.

The portion of I-590 between Winton Road and the Can of Worms was originally constructed in the 1960s and designated as part of NY 47 from Elmwood Avenue northward. In the late 1970s, I-590 was proposed as a designation for the entire southern half of the Outer Loop. Ultimately, it was cut back to its current western terminus at the then-proposed I-390. I-590 was officially assigned in 1980 following the elimination of NY 47, and the last segment of the freeway between Winton Road and I-390 was completed by the following year.

== Route description ==
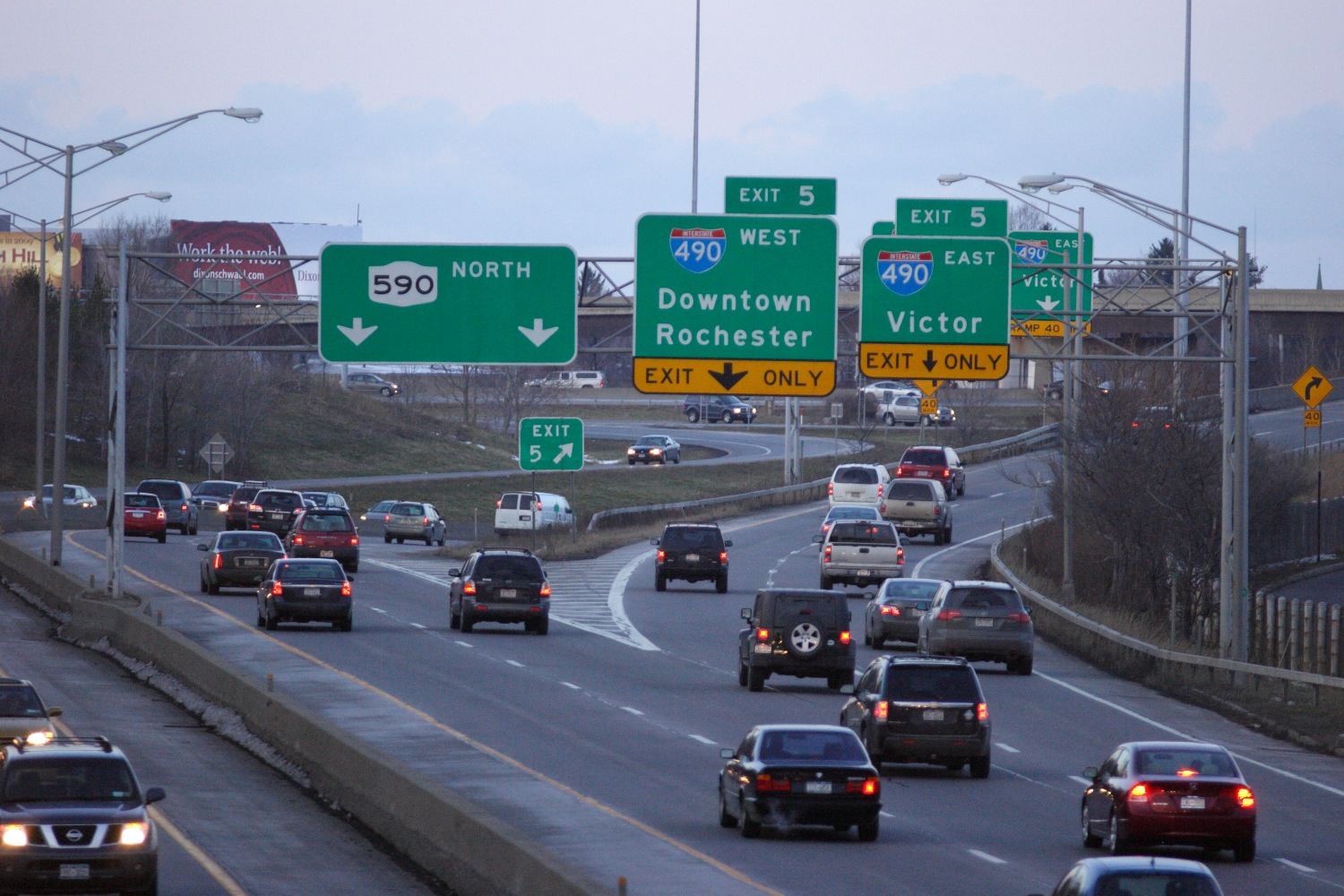
Northern terminus of I-590 at the Can of Worms

I-590 begins at a semi-directional T interchange with I-390 in the town of Brighton, a southern suburb of the city of Rochester. The route heads east from the junction, passing under South Clinton Avenue (which passes through the east half of the interchange but does not connect to either freeway) and traveling east through open fields to its first interchange (a diverging diamond interchange [DDI]) at South Winton Road. Here, the surroundings rapidly change from fields to densely populated residential areas as it passes through a more developed section of Brighton. As it approaches NY 31 (Monroe Avenue) at exit 2, I-590 turns a full 90 degrees to the north. Past NY 31, I-590 runs through the former Erie Canal and Rochester subway bed.

The freeway travels due north along this stretch, flanked on both sides by residential neighborhoods separated from I-590 only by sound barriers. Not far to the north of the intersection with NY 31 is exit 3, a partial diamond interchange for Elmwood Avenue permitting access from I-590 south and to I-590 north. Prior to 1980, NY 47 entered the freeway at this point and followed both I-590 and NY 590 north to Sea Breeze. Another partial interchange with Highland Avenue follows at exit 4—making the two connections that exit 3 omits—before I-590 enters the Can of Worms, a complex interchange connecting I-590 to I-490. North of the ramps leading to I-490, I-590 descends northeastward into a cut and passes below both I-490 and NY 96 as it becomes NY 590, which continues onward toward Sea Breeze.

== History ==
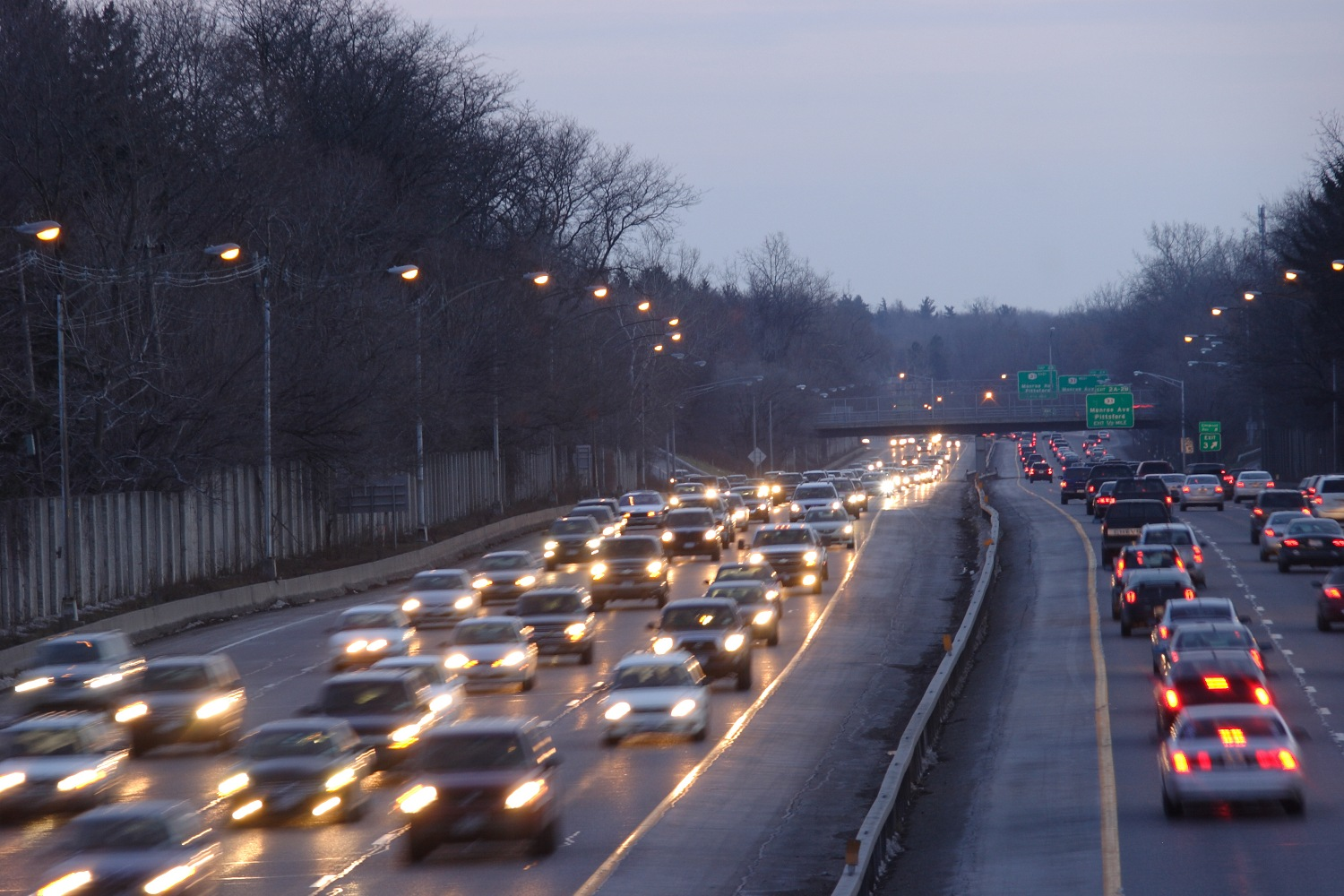
I-590 southbound in Brighton during rush hour

I-590 appeared on maps of the Rochester area as early as 1977 as a designation for the portion of the Outer Loop south of I-490. At the time, only two portions of the loop—from I-490 in Gates southeast to NY 383 in Chili and from Winton Road in Brighton to I-490 in Rochester—were complete and open to traffic. The western portion was constructed c. 1965 and designated as part of NY 47. The eastern section, which opened from Monroe Avenue (NY 31) to the Can of Worms c. 1965 and from NY 31 west to Winton Road by 1968, was part of NY 47 between Elmwood Avenue and I-490. South of Elmwood Avenue, the expressway had no signed number as the Federal Highway Administration had yet to assign the I-590 designation. Construction on the missing section of the Outer Loop's southern half began in the late 1970s.

Around the same time, the state of New York began to look into the possibility of changing the designations that were assigned to the Outer Loop. In one proposal submitted to the American Association of State Highway and Transportation Officials in the late 1970s, I-590 would be truncated to begin at the then-proposed junction with I-390 in Brighton but also extended northward along the Sea Breeze Expressway to NY 104 in Irondequoit. The rest of the loop south of I-490, meanwhile, would become part of an extended I-390. NY 47, the then-current designation for much of the Outer Loop, would be eliminated entirely. Most of the plans went into effect when the NY 47 designation was eliminated on March 18, 1980. The southern half of the Outer Loop was signed as planned; however, I-390 and I-590 were modified to end at their junctions with I-490. The section of I-590 from Winton Road to I-390—as well as the interchange connecting the two—was completed c. 1981.

In 2012, a DDI was added at the intersection of I-590 and Winton Road in the Brighton suburb of Rochester.

== Exit list ==
The entire route is in Monroe County.

Location	mi	km	Exit	Destinations	Notes
Brighton	0.00	0.00	–	I-390 to I-90 Toll (New York Thruway) – Corning, Airport, Greece	Southern terminus; exit 15A on I-390
Brighton	1.41	2.27	1	Winton Road	Diverging diamond interchange
Brighton	3.04	4.89	2	NY 31 (Monroe Avenue) – Pittsford	Signed as exits 2A (west) and 2B (east) southbound
Brighton	3.75	6.04	3	Elmwood Avenue	Southbound exit and northbound entrance
Brighton	4.46	7.18	4	Highland Avenue	Northbound exit and southbound entrance
Rochester	5.07	8.16	5	I-490 – Downtown Rochester, Victor	Can of Worms Interchange; exit 21 on I-490
Rochester	5.07	8.16	–	NY 590 north	Continuation north
1.000 mi = 1.609 km; 1.000 km = 0.621 mi: Incomplete access

== See also ==
- New York State Route 590 for exits 6–11
