= Cobbs Hill Park =

Public park in Rochester, New York

- Interactive map of Cobbs Hill Park
- Type: Municipal park
- Location: Rochester, New York, United States
- Coordinates: 43°08′19″N 77°34′18″W
- Area: 109 acres (44 ha) (132 acres (53 ha) with Washington Grove preservation district)
- Created: 1908
- Operator: City of Rochester Department of Recreation and Human Services
- Status: Open all year
- Website: cityofrochester.gov/locations/cobbs-hill-park-and-washington-grove

Cobbs Hill Park is a 109 acres (44 ha) municipal park in Rochester, New York, United States. The park is part of Rochester's Olmsted park system and was developed following recommendations by Frederick Law Olmsted Jr. and the Olmsted Brothers firm. It is the only major park in Rochester that remains under city control rather than Monroe County jurisdiction.

The park encompasses the Cobbs Hill Reservoir, a 144,000,000 U.S. gallons (550,000 m^{3}) active drinking water reservoir completed in 1908; Washington Grove, a 26 acres (11 ha) old-growth forest; Lake Riley, a remnant of the historic Erie Canal; and extensive recreational facilities. In September 2025, the Rochester City Council unanimously designated the Cobbs Hill Park Preservation District, the first new historic preservation district in Rochester in 32 years.

== History ==
=== Early development ===
The land comprising modern-day Cobbs Hill Park was named for Edna Cobb, who previously owned the property. In 1904, the City of Rochester purchased the hilltop for construction of a water reservoir. Construction of the Cobbs Hill Reservoir was completed in 1908, and George Eastman, founder of the Eastman Kodak Company, donated 15 acres crowning the hilltop to the city for park purposes.

In 1911, Frederick Law Olmsted Jr. recommended that the city acquire the surrounding hills for park development. The following year, a group of citizens purchased 26 acres (11 ha) of woodland—now known as Washington Grove—to prevent its conversion to a gravel pit.

=== Expansion and New Deal era ===
In 1922, the park was significantly expanded after the relocation of the Barge Canal, funded through a combination of public donations and city appropriations. The expansion incorporated the former canal widewaters, which became Lake Riley.

During the New Deal, a refectory with cafeteria and observation deck was constructed in 1933, funded by federal relief programs. The refectory hosted thousands of visitors annually and featured a beacon that helped guide aircraft to the Greater Rochester International Airport.

=== World War II and postwar ===
During World War II, a portion of the park was converted to military use, serving successively as army barracks, a prisoner of war camp, and postwar soldier housing. In 1957, the city sold 9.18 acres (3.72 ha) of parkland for the construction of Cobbs Hill Village, a senior housing complex.

=== Historic preservation ===
In 1972, a portion of Cobbs Hill Park was designated as a local landmark under Rochester's preservation ordinance. On September 24, 2025, the Rochester City Council unanimously approved the creation of the Cobbs Hill Park Preservation District, encompassing approximately 132 acres (53 ha) including both the park and Washington Grove. It was the first new historic preservation district established in Rochester in 32 years. The park has also been nominated for listing on the National Register of Historic Places.

== Cobbs Hill Reservoir ==
The Cobbs Hill Reservoir, completed in 1908, has a capacity of 144,000,000 U.S. gallons (550,000 m^{3}) and continues to actively supply drinking water to the City of Rochester. Water is sourced from Hemlock Lake, located approximately 30 miles (48 km) south of Rochester at a 400 ft (120 m) higher elevation.

A 0.7 mi (1.1 km) paved loop path around the reservoir is popular for walking and running and offers panoramic views of the Rochester skyline. The reservoir's granite gatehouse was designed by architect J. Foster Warner in Greek Revival style, featuring a wide portico with an ornate drinking fountain.

As an uncovered drinking water reservoir, the facility must comply with the EPA's Long Term 2 Enhanced Surface Water Treatment Rule (LT2) by November 2035.

== Washington Grove ==
Washington Grove is a 26 acres (11 ha) old-growth oak–hickory forest located within the park boundaries. The grove has never been logged, and its trees range from 100 to over 200 years in age, with at least one documented specimen aged at more than 250 years.

The grove supports over 110 native plant species and 142 documented bird species. It is one of the few old-growth forest remnants found within the limits of a United States city.

On September 16, 2021, Washington Grove was inducted into the Old-Growth Forest Network, a national organization that identifies and protects old-growth forests across the United States.

== Facilities ==
Cobbs Hill Park includes a range of recreational facilities:

- Six tennis courts
- Baseball and softball fields
- Basketball courts
- Soccer and football fields
- Playground (designed for ages 5–12)
- Lake Riley (former Erie Canal widewaters), with two lodges
- Hiking trails through Washington Grove

In September 2019, the park became the site of the first outdoor Fitness Court in New York State, a free-access outdoor fitness facility featuring seven exercise stations.

== See also ==
- Cobbs Hill Reservoir
- Parks of Rochester, New York
- Frederick Law Olmsted Jr.
- Olmsted Brothers
- Old-Growth Forest Network
