= Interstate 490 (New York) =

Highway in New York

Interstate 490
- Map of the Rochester, New York, metropolitan area with I-490 highlighted in red

Route information
- Auxiliary route of I-90
- Maintained by NYSDOT
- Length: 37.4 mi (60.2 km)
- Existed: c. 1961–present
- History: Completed early 1970s
- NHS: Entire route

Major junctions
- West end: I-90 Toll / New York Thruway in Le Roy
- I-390 / NY 390 in Gates; I-590 / NY 590 in Rochester
- East end: I-90 Toll / New York Thruway in Victor

Location
- Country: United States
- State: New York
- Counties: Genesee, Monroe, Ontario

Highway system
- Interstate Highway System; Main; Auxiliary; Suffixed; Business; Future; New York Highways; Interstate; US; State; Reference; Parkways
← NY 488	→ I-495

Interstate 490 (I-490) is an auxiliary Interstate Highway that serves the city of Rochester, New York, in the United States. It acts as a northerly alternate route to the New York State Thruway (I-90), leaving it at exit 47 in the town of Le Roy and rejoining the highway at exit 45 in the town of Victor 37.4 miles (60.2 km) to the east. I-490 connects with I-390 and New York State Route 390 (NY 390) on the western side of Rochester and I-590 and NY 590 on the east side of the city at an interchange known as the Can of Worms. The highway comprises the southernmost portion of the Inner Loop, a beltway around the interior of Rochester. Outside the city, I-490 serves several suburban villages, such as Churchville and Pittsford.

The eastern half of the freeway, named the Eastern Expressway, was built in stages from the 1950s to the 1970s as a connector between the Inner Loop and the thruway, and the section west of the Inner Loop and Downtown Rochester to I-90 in Le Roy is known as the Western Expressway. From Downtown Rochester to the Can of Worms, it follows the former right-of-way of the Rochester subway and, before it, the Erie Canal. The section west of the Inner Loop was mostly built during the 1960s and completed in the early 1970s. During the 1950s and early 1960s, the portion of the Eastern Expressway from what is now the Can of Worms east to Bushnell's Basin was originally designated as part of NY 96. That route was moved back onto its parallel surface routing c. 1961 when I-490 was assigned to the entirety of the then-proposed Le Roy–Victor freeway.

== Route description ==
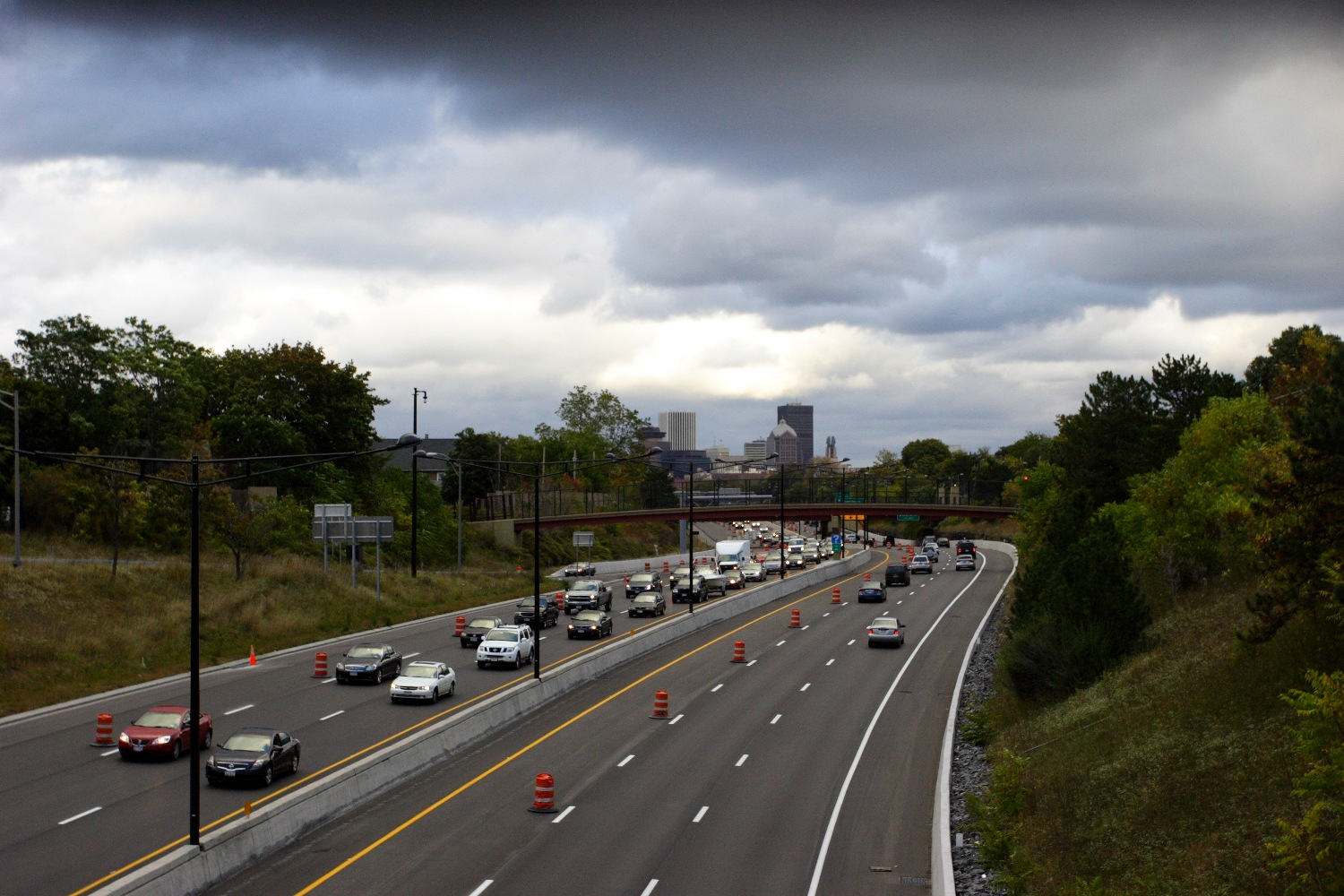
I-490 eastbound west of Downtown Rochester in the final stages of the Western Gateway project

Heading northeast from exit 47 of the New York State Thruway (I-90), I-490 passes through rural portions of eastern Genesee County and western Monroe County, skirting the villages of Bergen and Churchville. Gradually, the expressway takes a more easterly alignment near exit 3 before returning to the northeast at exit 4. At exit 6, I-490 intersects the Airport Expressway (NY 204). Past this interchange, I-490 heads due north, connecting to NY 33 and NY 531 before returning east. Prior to crossing the Erie Canal, I-490 meets NY 390 and I-390. Beyond the junction lies the canal and the city of Rochester.

Between the Mount Read Boulevard interchange at exit 10 and the Genesee River, I-490 is referred to as the "Western Gateway". This section, which saw major decorative and structural improvements in the late 2000s, travels due east through heavily residential neighborhoods before turning to the southeast near ESL Ballpark and a junction with the Inner Loop at exit 13. Just west of this point, I-490 passes over West Broad Street (NY 31) and close to the former Rochester terminal of the Buffalo, Rochester and Pittsburgh Railway, which now houses Nick Tahou Hots.

I-490 now becomes part of the Inner Loop as it passes just south of the city center and heads toward the Genesee River. I-490 crosses both the river and NY 383 by way of the Frederick Douglass–Susan B. Anthony Memorial Bridge and connects to NY 15 before leaving the Inner Loop and turning south and east to follow the former pathway of the Erie Canal and the Rochester subway through the east side of the city. Along this stretch, I-490 connects to NY 31 (now part of Monroe Avenue) and passes north of Cobbs Hill Reservoir and the surrounding Cobbs Hill Park.

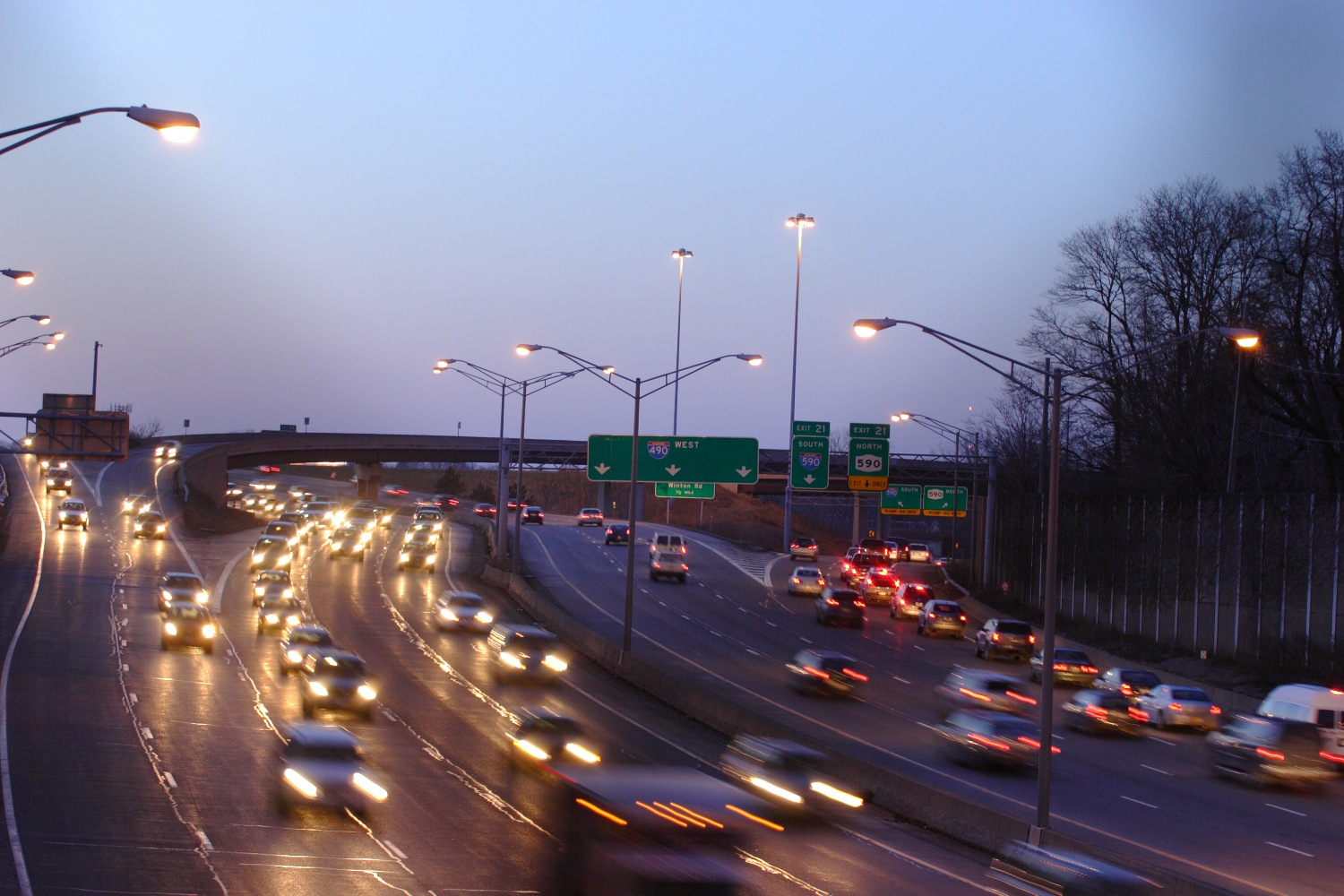
I-490 westbound at the Can of Worms

I-490 continues to run in the former bed until exit 21, where I-490 connects to NY 590 and I-590 at an interchange known locally as the Can of Worms. At this point, the former Erie Canal route (now part of I-590) curves southward while I-490 continues eastward into the eastern suburbs of Rochester. Between exits 21 and 24, I-490 parallels the CSX Transportation-owned Rochester Subdivision rail line, intersecting NY 441, a four-lane divided highway in the process. South of exit 25, I-490 traverses the southeastern suburbs of Rochester, passing close to East Rochester, Pittsford, and Bushnell's Basin and closely paralleling NY 96 on its way toward the Ontario County line. The freeway meets NY 96 twice in Perinton and a third time in the Ontario County town of Victor, where I-490 passes along the western fringe of Eastview Mall. I-490 ends a short distance southeast of the third NY 96 interchange at Thruway exit 45.

== History ==
The portion of I-490 from exit 15 southeast to the Can of Worms follows the original path of the Erie Canal through the city of Rochester. After the canal was rerouted to bypass Rochester in 1920, the former canal bed was purchased by the city for roughly $1.5 million (equivalent to $17.7 million in 2024). Plans drawn up by the city in the early 1910s called for a highway to be built in the old canal bed; however, subsequent proposals leaned toward repurposing the bed as a rapid transit system instead. The Rochester subway, as it became known, began operation in 1927. As ridership on the line declined in the 1940s and early 1950s, the city elected to shut the subway down in 1956 and use the right-of-way for a new highway connecting the Inner Loop to the recently completed New York State Thruway south of Rochester.

Construction of the Eastern Expressway, a limited-access highway connecting the Inner Loop to the thruway in Victor, began in the early 1950s with the first section extending from NY 96 in Bushnell's Basin to NY 31F near East Rochester. It was completed by 1956 and originally designated as part of NY 96. An extension northwest to the present site of the Can of Worms was opened to traffic by the following year. The expressway remained part of NY 96 until c. 1961 when it was designated as part of I-490, a proposed route extending westward through Downtown Rochester and southwestward through the western suburbs to Thruway exit 47 in Le Roy. The portion of the highway between the Inner Loop and Winton Road was completed in the old subway cut by this time, while the segment between Winton Road and the Can of Worms was opened c. 1963.

Work on the portion of I-490 west of the Inner Loop began c. 1962 and initially extended from NY 259 in Chili to Mount Read Boulevard two miles (3.2 km) west of downtown. This section was completed by the following year. The remainder of the freeway west of Rochester was opened to traffic as far west as NY 36 near Churchville c. 1965 and finished by 1968. The last two gaps in the freeway—from Mount Read Boulevard east to the Inner Loop in Rochester and from Bushnell's Basin southeast to the thruway in Pittsford and Victor—were filled in the early 1970s.

I-490 formerly had two sets of rest areas, one in Victor and one in Churchville. The Churchville pair, located east of exit 3, were closed on July 18, 1990, after numerous complaints about sexual activity in the area. The ones in Victor, west of the thruway interchange, were closed on November 1, 1990, for the winter as a temporary cost-saving measure. The New York State Department of Transportation decided in June 1991 to make these closures permanent to save on costs.

The planned construction of the Inner Loop (now part of I-490) through the Corn Hill district of Downtown Rochester just west of the Genesee River was the driving factor that led the Rochester Institute of Technology (RIT) to relocate to its present location in Henrietta in 1968. The plan called for the demolition of a number of RIT buildings and would have resulted in splitting the campus into two halves separated by the new freeway. The portion of I-490 from exit 9 (I-390 and NY 390) in Gates to exit 27 (NY 96) in Perinton was ceremoniously designated as the "Erie Canal Expressway" by the New York State Legislature on August 16, 2005.

== Exit list ==
County	Location	mi	km	Exit	Destinations	Notes
Genesee	Town of Le Roy	0.00	0.00	–	I-90 Toll / New York Thruway – Syracuse, Buffalo	Western terminus; exit 47 on I-90 / Thruway
Genesee	Town of Le Roy	0.19	0.31	1	NY 19 – Le Roy, Bergen	Last westbound exit before toll
Genesee–Monroe county line	Bergen–Riga town line	3.38	5.44	2	NY 33 / NY 33A – Bergen, Batavia	
Monroe	Riga	6.35	10.22	3	NY 36 – Churchville	
Monroe	Chili	10.78	17.35	4	NY 259 – North Chili, West Chili	
Monroe	Chili	14.09	22.68	5	NY 386 – Chili Center	
Monroe	Gates	15.78	25.40	6	NY 204 east – Airport	Western terminus of NY 204
Monroe	Gates	16.58	26.68	7	NY 33 (Buffalo Road) NY 531 west – Spencerport, Brockport	Signed as exits 7A (east) and 7B (west); no westbound access to NY 531; western terminus of NY 531
Monroe	Gates	17.17	27.63	8	NY 531 west – Spencerport, Brockport	No eastbound exit; eastern terminus of NY 531
Monroe	Gates	19.02	30.61	9	I-390 south / NY 390 north – Greece, Airport	Signed as exits 9A (north) and 9B (south); exits 20A-B on I-390/NY 390
Monroe	Rochester	20.17	32.46	10	Mount Read Boulevard	Signed as exits 10A (south) and 10B (north) eastbound
Monroe	Rochester	20.95	33.72	11	Ames Street / Child Street	Signed as exits 11A (Ames Street) and 11B (Child Street) westbound
Monroe	Rochester	21.85	35.16	12	Broad Street / Stadiums	No westbound exit; serves ESL Ballpark and Rochester Community Sports Complex Stadium
Monroe	Rochester	22.25	35.81	13	Inner Loop east – Downtown Rochester	Western end of Inner Loop concurrency
Monroe	Rochester	22.76	36.63	14	Broad Street / Plymouth Avenue – ESL Ballpark	Westbound exit and eastbound entrance
Monroe	Rochester	22.94	36.92	15	NY 15 / NY 31 (South Avenue) Inner Loop ends	Eastbound exit and eastbound entrance; western terminus of Inner Loop
Monroe	Rochester	23.42	37.69	16	Clinton Avenue (NY 15 north) – Downtown Rochester	Westbound exit and eastbound entrance
Monroe	Rochester	23.92	38.50	17	Goodman Street / Broadway	
Monroe	Rochester	24.37	39.22	18	NY 31 (Monroe Avenue)	
Monroe	Rochester	24.91	40.09	19	Culver Road	
Monroe	Rochester	25.91	41.70	20	Winton Road	
Monroe	Rochester–Brighton line	26.44	42.55	21	I-590 south / NY 590 north	Can of Worms Interchange; exit 5 on I-590/NY 590
Monroe	Brighton	27.03	43.50	22	Penfield Road	Eastbound exit and westbound entrance; former NY 441
Monroe	Brighton	27.82	44.77	23	NY 441 (Linden Avenue) – Penfield	
Monroe	Town of Pittsford	29.14	46.90	24	East Rochester	Access via NY 940U
Monroe	Town of Pittsford	29.55	47.56	25	NY 31F – Fairport	
Monroe	Perinton	32.13	51.71	26	NY 31 – Pittsford, Palmyra	
Monroe	Perinton	33.76	54.33	27	NY 96 – Bushnell's Basin	
Monroe	Perinton	35.05	56.41	28	NY 96	Eastbound exit and westbound entrance
Ontario	Town of Victor	37.00	59.55	29	NY 96 – Victor	No eastbound access to NY 96 north; last eastbound exit before toll
Ontario	Town of Victor	37.40	60.19	–	I-90 Toll / New York Thruway – Albany, Buffalo	Eastern terminus; exit 45 on I-90 / Thruway
1.000 mi = 1.609 km; 1.000 km = 0.621 mi: Concurrency terminus; Electronic toll collection; Incomplete access; Route transition
