= New York State Route 350 =

State highway in Wayne County, New York, US

New York State Route 350
- Map of Monroe and Wayne counties with NY 350 highlighted in red

Route information
- Maintained by NYSDOT
- Length: 11.40 mi (18.35 km)
- Existed: c. 1932–present

Major junctions
- South end: NY 31 / NY 31F in Macedon
- NY 441 in Walworth
- North end: NY 104 in Ontario

Location
- Country: United States
- State: New York
- Counties: Wayne

Highway system
- New York Highways; Interstate; US; State; Reference; Parkways
← NY 349	→ NY 351

New York State Route 350 (NY 350) is a north–south state highway in western Wayne County, New York, in the United States. It extends for 11.40 miles (18.35 km) from an intersection with NY 31 and NY 31F in the village of Macedon to a junction with NY 104 in the town of Ontario. NY 350 serves as the eastern terminus for three routes: the aforementioned NY 31F, NY 286, and NY 441, all of which originate in the Rochester area. Aside from the village of Macedon at its south end and the hamlet of Ontario Center at its north terminus, NY 350 serves mostly rural areas dominated by farmland. NY 350 was assigned c. 1932 to the portion of its routing south of Cator Corners, the north junction with NY 31F. It was extended northward to its current terminus in the 1940s.

== Route description ==
NY 350 begins at an intersection with NY 31 in the village of Macedon near the former Mobil Chemical and Tyco plant. The junction also serves as the eastern terminus of NY 31F, which overlaps NY 350 north from the intersection on Ontario Center Road. The conjoined routes cross over the Erie Canal and an industrial railroad spur off of the CSX Transportation-owned Rochester Subdivision before exiting the village and entering the surrounding town of Macedon. NY 31F and NY 350 pass through forested areas up to an overpass carrying the Rochester Subdivision line over the road, at which point the wooded areas give way to open fields. The two routes split roughly 1.75 miles (2.82 km) north of Macedon at a junction named Cator Corners. While NY 31F heads west through Macedon Center toward Monroe County, NY 350 continues east as Ontario Center Road.

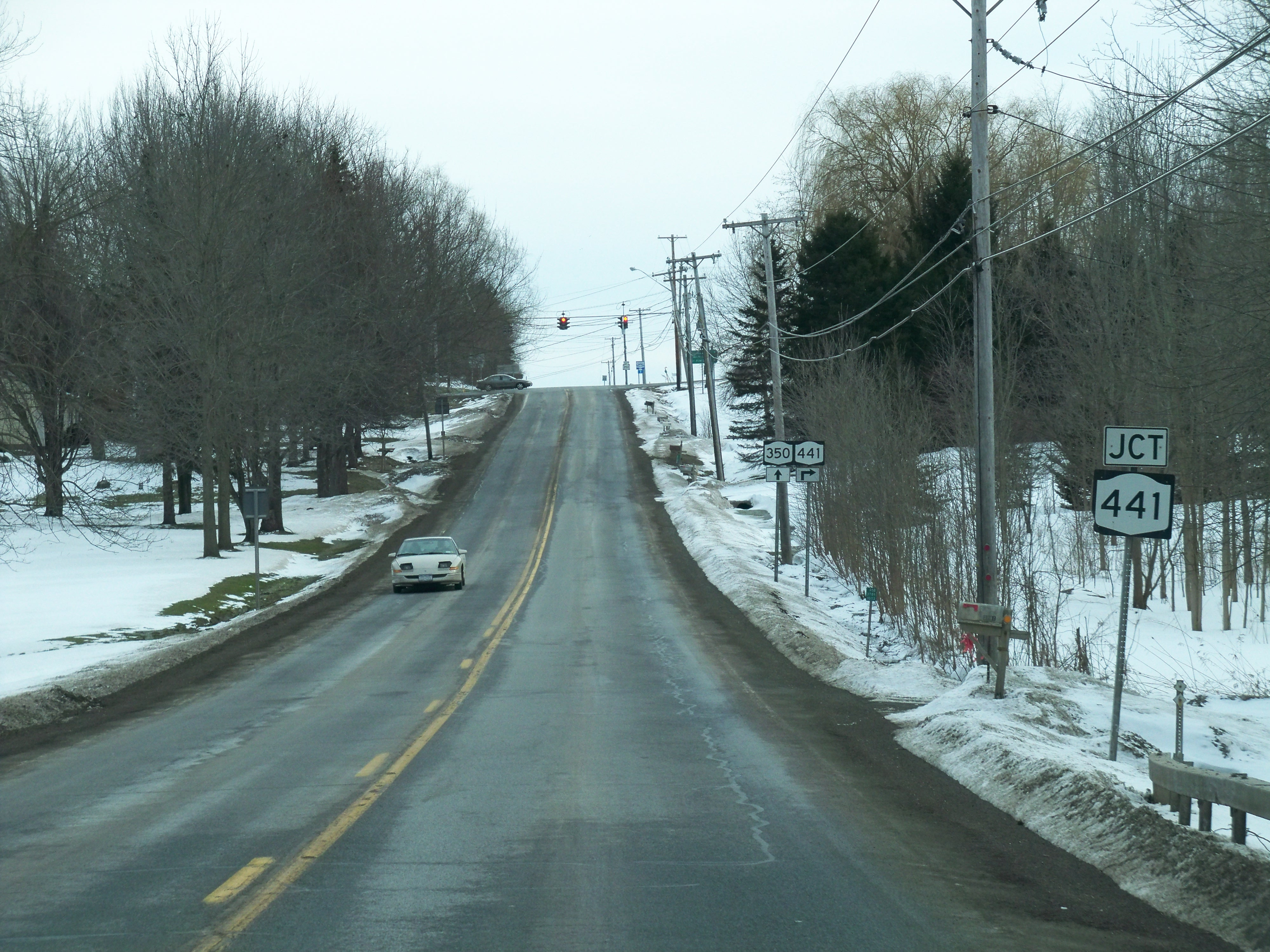
Approaching NY 441 on NY 350 southbound in Walworth

As NY 350 departs Cator Corners, it curves back to the north, leaving Macedon Center Road—the east–west roadway that NY 31F follows from Cator Corners west to the county line—to continue east as a county road. NY 350 continues across rolling farmland to the town of Walworth, where it meets the eastern terminus of NY 441 at a four-way intersection with Walworth–Penfield Road west of the hamlet of Walworth. The route continues on, entering a slightly more forested area as it heads toward a junction with NY 286 at Atlantic Avenue. Like NY 31F and NY 441 before it, NY 286 serves as an east–west connector between NY 350 and the eastern suburbs of the city of Rochester 15 miles (24 km) to the west.

Past NY 286, the wooded areas become more sporadic as NY 350 turns to travel in a more northwesterly direction across farmlands and fields. It soon enters the town of Ontario, where development along the road increases as it heads into the hamlet of Ontario Center. Here, it passes Wayne Central High School of the Wayne Central School District prior to intersecting Ridge Road in the center of the community. This junction once served as Ontario Center's main business district; however, it has been replaced in purpose by the adjacent four-lane NY 104, located just 200 yards (183 m) north of Ridge Road. NY 350 ends upon intersecting the NY 104 divided highway; however, Ontario Center Road continues north of the east–west commercial strip for 3 miles (5 km) to Lake Road near the Lake Ontario shoreline and the R. E. Ginna Nuclear Power Plant.

== History ==
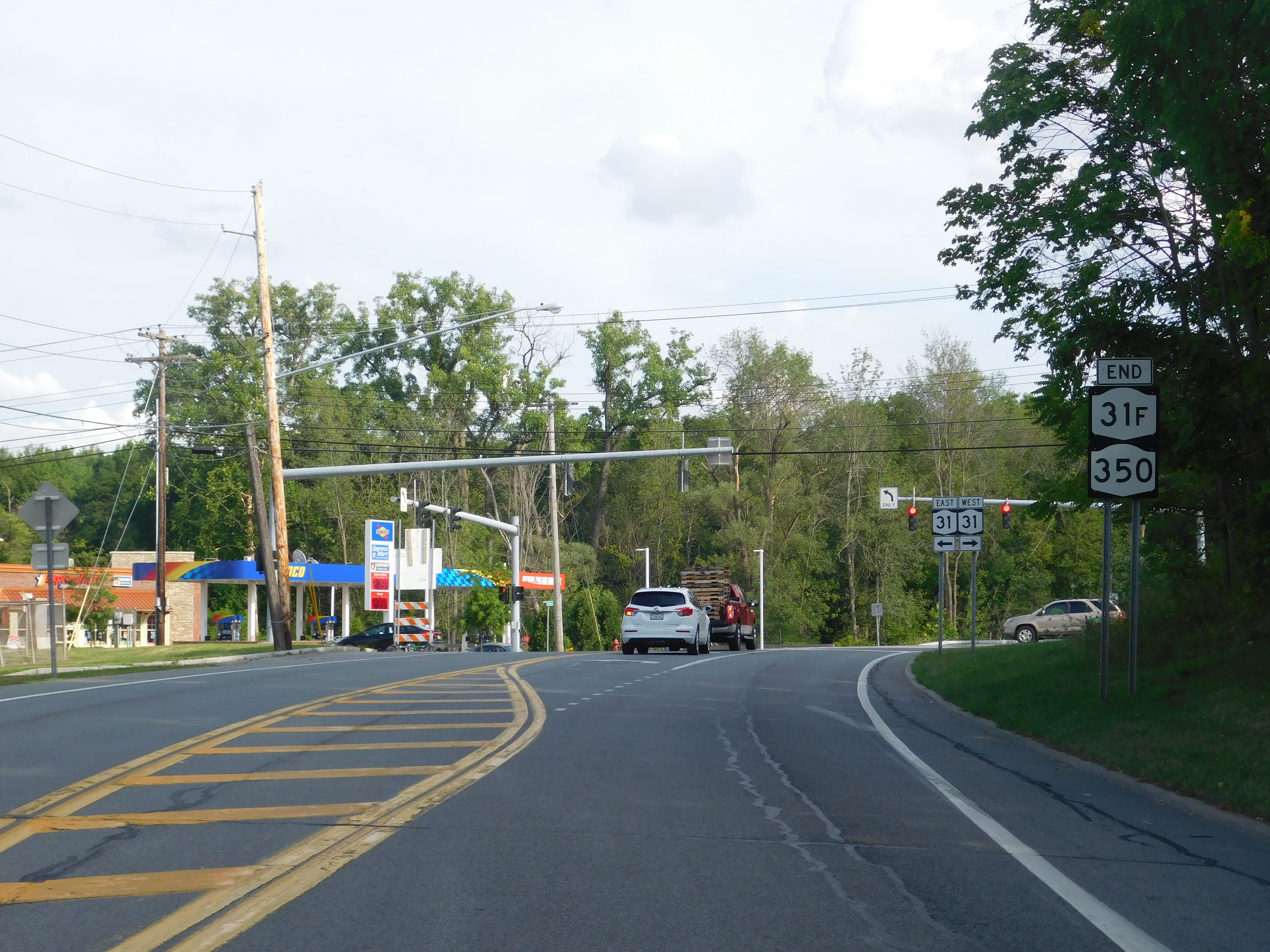
The southernmost stretch of NY 350 in Macedon, just north of its terminus at NY 31. This section is also part of NY 31F.

The portion of modern NY 350 that overlaps with NY 31F was originally designated as part of Route 20, an unsigned legislative route, by the New York State Legislature in 1908. Route 20 continued east from here on what is now NY 31 and west on current NY 31F. On March 1, 1921, Route 20 was altered to follow modern NY 31 and NY 250 between Macedon and Fairport, bypassing current NY 350 entirely. Even though it was no longer part of a legislative route, the Macedon–Cator Corners highway was taken over by the state of New York by 1926. At the time, it was the only portion of what is now NY 350 that was state-maintained.

In the 1930 renumbering of state highways in New York, the segment of current NY 350 between Atlantic Avenue and Ridge Road became part of an extended NY 35, which had ended at a junction west of the village of Avon in Livingston County prior to 1930. The extension took NY 35 northeastward through Monroe and Wayne Counties to a new terminus in the town of Ontario. NY 35 entered Wayne County on modern NY 286 (Atlantic Avenue) and followed Atlantic Avenue and Ontario Center Road north to NY 3 (Ridge Road; later U.S. Route 104 or US 104). By the following year, the portion of Ontario Center Road from Cator Corners to NY 33 (Walworth–Penfield Road; now NY 441) was designated as part of NY 33B. The Macedon–Cator Corners segment of former legislative Route 20 was designated as NY 350 c. 1932.

NY 35 was split up into two routes in the early 1940s. The portion of old NY 35 west of Ontario Center Road became NY 383 while the Ontario Center Road section became part of an extended NY 350. The extension created an overlap between NY 350 and NY 33B from Cator Corners to NY 33. NY 33 was truncated on its east end to downtown Rochester on January 1, 1949. As a result, NY 33B was redesignated as NY 31F. The easternmost leg of the route still overlapped NY 350; however, it now followed NY 350 south to NY 31 in Macedon. NY 350 was extended a short distance northward in the mid-1940s to meet the new super two highway carrying US 104 between Union Hill and Sodus.

== Major intersections ==
The entire route is in Wayne County.

Location	mi	km	Destinations	Notes
Town of Macedon	0.00	0.00	NY 31 (Main Street) / NY 31F west / South Erie Street – Palmyra, Rochester	Southern terminus; southern terminus of NY 31F / NY 350 overlap; eastern terminus of NY 31F; hamlet of Macedon
Town of Macedon	1.73	2.78	NY 31F west (Macedon Center Road) / Wiedrick Road	Northern terminus of NY 31F / NY 350 overlap; hamlet of Cator Corners
Town of Walworth	5.09	8.19	NY 441 west (Walworth Penfield Road) – East Penfield	Eastern terminus of NY 441; hamlet of Walworth
Town of Walworth	6.84	11.01	NY 286 west (Atlantic Avenue)	Eastern terminus of NY 286
Town of Ontario	11.40	18.35	NY 104 / Ontario Center Road – Sodus, Rochester	Northern terminus; hamlet of Ontario Center
1.000 mi = 1.609 km; 1.000 km = 0.621 mi: Concurrency terminus
