= Wayne Central School District =

School district in New York, United States

Address
- 6200 Ontario Center Road Ontario Center, New York, 14520; United States

District information
- Type: Public
- Grades: K–12
- NCES District ID: 3630330

Students and staff
- Students: 2,042 (2020–2021)
- Teachers: 197.98 (on an FTE basis)
- Staff: 215.02 (on an FTE basis)
- Student–teacher ratio: 10.31:1

Other information
- Website: www.waynecsd.org

The Wayne Central School District is a public school district in New York State that serves approximately 2,200 students in portions of the towns of Macedon, Ontario, Walworth and Williamson in Wayne County and portions of the towns of Penfield and Webster in Monroe County, with an operating budget of $44 million (≈$17,500 per student). Its schools have been recognized several times by the Democrat and Chronicle (Rochester, New York's newspaper) as being in the top 10 of all schools in the Rochester area. The graduation rate is 95% of students receiving a Regents diploma, with 90% of those going on to college. The District motto is "Commitment to Excellence".

The Wayne Central School District was formed on April 29, 1949, as the consolidation of 19 rural and 2 union free districts in portions of the towns of Macedon, Ontario, Walworth and Williamson in Wayne County and Penfield and Webster in Monroe County. In 1972, a portion of the district in the southwest became part of the then-new Gananda Central School District.

The student-teacher ratio is 20-23:1(elementary), 21-23:1(middle-high school).

At the November 16th, 2016 meeting, the Board of Education voted to close Freewill Elementary School and reconfigure the remaining grades into K-2 at Ontario Primary, 3-4 at Ontario Elementary, 5-8 at the Middle School, and 9-12 at the High School. The Board cited a prolonged period of declining enrollment in the district as well as looming financial pressures as reasons for the closure of Freewill. Due to the large drop in enrollment, the closure of Freewill was not expected to affect existing class sizes as the district would take advantage of previously underutilized space in the remaining elementary schools to accommodate the students from Freewill.

== Board of education ==
The Board of Education (BOE) consists of nine members who serve rotating three-year terms. Elections are held each May for board members and to vote on the School District budget.

== Schools ==
=== Elementary schools ===
- Freewill Elementary School (closed in 2017, was K-5)
- Wayne Primary School (grades K-2, 430 students), Principal – Pamela Tatro
- Wayne Elementary School (grades 3-4, 330 students), Principal – Donna Rizzo

=== Middle school ===
- Thomas C. Armstrong Middle School (grades 5-8, 670 students), Principal – James Herendeen

=== High school ===
- James A. Beneway High School (grades 9-12, 750 students) Principal (interim) – Jason Berger
