= Hindu Heritage Summer Camp =

- Interactive map of Hindu Heritage Summer Camp
- Location: Macedon, New York
- Coordinates: 43.125679°N 77.376732°W
- Established: 1976
- Website: www.omhhsc.org

The Hindu Heritage Summer Camp, founded in 1976, is located in Macedon, New York.

== Background ==
The camp was founded by Devi Parvati, a convert to Hinduism. It began with six tents at a location in the Pocono Mountains of Pennsylvania. During the 1990s it moved to Macedon, where it could utilize the facilities of the India Community Center for the Rochester area.

Morning reveille at the camp is blown on a conch shell in homage to Hindu deity Vishnu, who is often depicted carrying one, In addition to traditional summer camp activities such as drama and arts and crafts, campers are offered classes on Hindu philosophy, playing cricket, and learning the garba, a traditional dance from Gujarat.
