= Ontario (CDP), New York =

Ontario, New York
- Hamlet and CDP
- Location within the state of New York
- Coordinates: 43°13′03″N 77°16′46″W
- Country: United States
- State: New York
- County: Wayne
- Town: Ontario

Area
  - Total: 4.03 sq mi (10.44 km^{2})
  - Land: 4.03 sq mi (10.44 km^{2})
  - Water: 0 sq mi (0.00 km^{2})
- Elevation: 440 ft (134 m)

Population (2020)
  - Total: 2,215
  - Density: 549.6/sq mi (212.21/km^{2})
- Time zone: UTC-5 (Eastern (EST))
  - Summer (DST): UTC-4 (EDT)
- ZIP Code: 14519
- Area codes: 315 and 680
- FIPS code: 36-55002
- GNIS feature ID: 2631644

Ontario is a hamlet and census-designated place (CDP) in the town of Ontario, Wayne County, New York, United States. The CDP extends into land surrounding the hamlet, including the east half of the hamlet of Ontario Center. The population of the CDP was 2,160 at the 2010 census. Government offices for the Town of Ontario are located in the hamlet.

The Brick Church Corners historic district was listed on the National Register of Historic Places in 1973.

== Geography ==
Ontario is located at 43°13′03″N 77°16′46″W.

According to the United States Census Bureau, the CDP has a total area of 3.8 square miles (9.8 km^{2}), all land.

Ontario is located off Route 104. The primary intersection in the hamlet is at Ridge Road (CR 103) and Knickerbocker Road (CR 108).

== Demographics ==
Historical population
| Census | Pop. | Note | %± |
|---|---|---|---|
| 2020 | 2,215 | | — |
U.S. Decennial Census

As of the census of 2010, there were 2,160 people, 916 households, and 580 families residing in the CDP. The population density was 568.4 people per square mile (219.5 people/km^{2}). The racial makeup of the CDP was 96.3% White, 1.5% Black or African American, 0.2% Native American, 0.3% Asian, 0.0% Pacific Islander, 0.1% from other races, and 1.5% from two or more races. Hispanic or Latino of any race were 1.3% of the population.

There were 916 households, out of which 30.0% had children under the age of 18 living with them, 41.9% were married couples living together, 15.3% had a female householder with no husband present, and 36.7% were non-families. 30.2% of all households were made up of individuals, and 13.5% had someone living alone who was 65 years of age or older. The average household size was 2.36 and the average family size was 2.92.

In the CDP, the population was spread out, with 27.8% under the age of 20, 5.1% from 20 to 24, 24.7% from 25 to 44, 29.1% from 45 to 64, and 13.4% who were 65 years of age or older. The median age was 40.1 years. For every 100 females, there were 92.9 males. For every 100 females age 18 and over, there were 87.6 males.

The median income for a household in the CDP was $35,255, and the median income for a family was $56,719. Males had a median income of $32,955 versus $29,881 for females. The per capita income for the CDP was $25,204. About 8.2% of families and 13.3% of the population were below the poverty line, including 24.6% of those under age 18 and 6.7% of those age 65 or over.

=== Housing ===
There were 971 housing units at an average density of 255.5 per square mile (98.6/km^{2}). 5.7% of housing units were vacant.

There were 916 occupied housing units in the CDP. 640 were owner-occupied units (69.9%), while 276 were renter-occupied (30.1%). The homeowner vacancy rate was 1.5% of total units. The rental unit vacancy rate was 7.7%.
