= James A. Beneway High School =

High school in Ontario, NY

Location
- 6200 Ontario Center Rd; Ontario Center, New York 14520; United States
- Coordinates: 43.2238°N 77.3045°W

Information
- Type: Public
- School district: Wayne Central School District
- NCES School ID: 363033004078
- Principal: Jason Berger
- Teaching staff: 63.74 (on an FTE basis)
- Grades: 9-12
- Enrollment: 671 (2023-2024)
- Student to teacher ratio: 10.53
- Campus: Suburban: Large
- Colors: Navy Blue and Gold
- Mascot: Eagles
- Yearbook: Eagle
- Website: wh.waynecsd.org

James A. Beneway High School is a high school in the Wayne Central School District in Ontario, New York. The School offers Advanced Placement and Gemini courses and is one of only 2 schools in Wayne County to offer the International Baccalaureate Diploma program. The School Enrollment is approximately 800.
