= Walworth, New York =

- Town
- Location in Wayne County and the state of New York.

- Location within the state of New York
- Coordinates: 43°9′34″N 77°19′15″W
- Country: United States
- State: New York
- County: Wayne
- Settled: 1799
- Established: April 20, 1829

Government
  - Type: Town Board
  - Supervisor: Michael R Donalty
  - Clerk: Aimée Phillips
  - Court: Justice Daniel P. Majchrzak, Jr. Justice Charles Young
  - Town Council: Alex Kelly; Amber Linson; James Harden; Richard Johnson

Area
  - Total: 33.90 sq mi (87.79 km^{2})
  - Land: 33.85 sq mi (87.68 km^{2})
  - Water: 0.042 sq mi (0.11 km^{2})
- Elevation: 571 ft (174 m)

Population (2010)
  - Total: 9,449
  - Estimate (2016): 9,269
  - Density: 273.8/sq mi (105.71/km^{2})
- Time zone: UTC-5 (Eastern (EST))
  - Summer (DST): UTC-4 (EDT)
- ZIP code: 14568
- Area codes: 315, 585 and 680
- FIPS code: 36-78102
- GNIS feature ID: 0979594
- Website: http://www.townofwalworthny.gov/

Walworth is a town in Wayne County, New York, United States named after Reuben Walworth, a state official. The population was 9,449 at the 2010 census.

The Town of Walworth is on the western border of the county and is east of Rochester, New York. It has a hamlet, also called Walworth.

== History ==
The town was first settled in 1799 when four brothers — Andrew, John, Samuel, and Daniel Millet — left their homes in Connecticut and became the first settlers in what is now the hamlet of Walworth, building the first log cabins there.

Stephen and Daniel Douglas, also from Connecticut, settled in the area in 1800. Stephen Douglas built the first frame house at the hamlet's present four corners, and the growing community became known for a time as Douglas Corners.

The Town of Walworth was organized from the Town of Ontario by act of the New York State Legislature on April 20, 1829, the last town formed in Wayne County.

Theron G. Yeomans of Walworth was an early importer of Holstein cattle and became the first president of the Holstein-Friesian Association of America. Susan Cleveland, sister of President Grover Cleveland, married into the Yeomans family. In 1934, a freeze reportedly killed many of the town's orchards, leading to a decline in fruit growing.

== Geography ==
According to the United States Census Bureau, the town has a total area of 33.9 square miles (88 km^{2}), of which 33.8 square miles (88 km^{2}) is land and 0.04 square miles (0.10 km^{2}) (0.12%) is water.

The Town of Walworth is bordered by the towns of Ontario to the north, Marion to the east, Macedon to the south, and Penfield (Monroe County) to the west.

New York State Route 350 and New York State Route 441 intersect in the town. New York State Route 286 is another east–west highway, paralleling and north of NY-441, also ending at NY-350.

== Demographics ==
Historical population
Census	Pop.	Note	%±
1830	1,781		—
1840	1,734		−2.6%
1850	1,981		14.2%
1860	2,097		5.9%
1870	2,236		6.6%
1880	2,338		4.6%
1890	2,195		−6.1%
1900	2,137		−2.6%
1910	2,187		2.3%
1920	1,997		−8.7%
1930	2,047		2.5%
1940	1,956		−4.4%
1950	2,336		19.4%
1960	2,782		19.1%
1970	4,584		64.8%
1980	5,281		15.2%
1990	6,945		31.5%
2000	8,402		21.0%
2010	9,449		12.5%
2016 (est.)	9,269	▼	−1.9%
U.S. Decennial Census

As of the census of 2010, there were 9,949 people, 3,356 households, and 2,694 families residing in the town. The population density was 278.7 inhabitants per square mile (107.6/km^{2}). The racial makeup of the town was 96.5% White, 0.9% Black or African American, 0.1% Native American, 0.8% Asian, 0.0% Pacific Islander, 0.3% from other races, and 1.4% from two or more races. Hispanic or Latino of any race were 1.9% of the population.

There were 3,356 households, out of which 40.2% had people under the age of 18 living with them, 69.0% were married couples living together, 7.2% had a female householder with no husband present, and 19.7% were non-families. 15.0% of all households were made up of individuals, and 5.0% had someone living alone who was 65 years of age or older. The average household size was 2.81 and the average family size was 3.14.

In the town, the population was spread out, with 30.4% under the age of 20, 3.6% from 20 to 24, 26.6% from 25 to 44, 30.6% from 45 to 64, and 8.7% who were 65 years of age or older. The median age was 39.5 years. For every 100 females, there were 99.3 males. For every 100 females age 18 and over, there were 98.0 males.

The median income for a household in the town was $76,146, and the median income for a family was $85,181. Males had a median income of $64,392 versus $41,594 for females. The per capita income for the town was $29,551. About 1.0% of families and 2.7% of the population were below the poverty line, including 2.3% of those under age 18 and 0.8% of those age 65 or over.

=== Housing ===
There were 3,486 housing units at an average density of 102.8 per square mile (39.7/km^{2}); a total of 3.7% of housing units were vacant.

There were 3,356 occupied housing units in the town, of which 3,093 were owner-occupied units (92.2%), while 263 were renter-occupied (7.8%). The homeowner vacancy rate was 0.7% of total units. The rental unit vacancy rate was 12.9%.

== Communities and locations in the Town of Walworth ==
- Gananda — A planned community begun in 1971, located near the southern town line.
- Huddle — A hamlet by the southeast corner of the town on County Road 205 and south of Walworth hamlet.
- Lincoln — A hamlet on County Road 201 near the western town line.
- Walworth — The hamlet of Walworth is near the east town line on NY-441 and County Roads 205 and 207. It was once called "Douglass Corners" after two brothers who arrived in 1800 and built a tavern.
- West Walworth — A hamlet on County Road 204 near the western town line. It was settled circa 1805. Originally called Birch Bridge. Birthplace of Artist Charles Livingston Bull (1874–1932).

== School districts ==
Walworth is served by Wayne Central, Gananda Central and Penfield Central school districts.
