= Lincoln, Wayne County, New York =

Community in New York

Coordinates: 43°11′00″N 77°20′40″W

Lincoln is a hamlet in the Town of Walworth, Wayne County, New York, United States. It is located seven miles (11 km) northwest of the hamlet of Walworth, at an elevation of 505 feet (154 m). The primary cross roads where the hamlet is located are Plank Road (CR 201), North Lincoln Road (CR 200) and South Lincoln Road (CR 202).

The area is primarily agricultural, but becoming more residential. The Lincoln Baptist Church is located in the hamlet. Lincoln Volunteer Fire Department, formed in 1947, serves the hamlet and surrounding area.

In the fall of 2010, Mike Wolfe and Frank Fritz of The History Channel's American Pickers picked through the old cheese factory (built c. 1867) on Plank Road in Lincoln. Lincoln Volunteer Fire Department members provided equipment to assist them in gaining access to some sections of the building. Footage was first aired during an episode on January 17, 2011.
