= Ontario Center, New York =

Hamlet in New York, United States

Coordinates: 43°13′33″N 77°18′21″W

Ontario Center is a hamlet in the Town of Ontario, Wayne County, New York, United States. It is located one mile (2 km) west-northwest of the hamlet of Ontario, at an elevation of 449 feet (137 m). The primary intersection in the hamlet is at N.Y. Route 350 and Ridge Road (CR 103). N.Y. Route 104 passes just north of Ontario Center.

A United States Post Office is located in Ontario Center with a ZIP Code of 14520.

The First Presbyterian Church of Ontario Center was listed on the National Register of Historic Places in 1998.
