= West Walworth, New York =

Hamlet in New York, United States

Coordinates: 43°08′48″N 77°20′44″W

West Walworth is a hamlet in the southwest corner of the town of Walworth, Wayne County, New York, United States.

== History ==
Originally settled in the early 19th century, its cemetery contains the gravesites of two Revolutionary War veterans, Nathaniel Palmer and Ebenezer Still. West Walworth has two churches: Eastside Christian Church, the former First Baptist Church of West Walworth, founded in 1812, and the Zion United Methodist church (), founded in 1856. The West Walworth volunteer fire department is another local fixture having been founded in 1946.

== Geography ==
The area around West Walworth is in transition from a mainly agricultural area to a suburban landscape dotted with housing developments.

== Notable people ==
Wildlife artist Charles Livingston Bull was born here in 1874.
