= Gananda, New York =

Community in New York, United States

Coordinates: 43.122°N 77.320°W

Gananda is a small "master planned community" (and census-designated place) in Wayne County, New York, United States, approximately twenty minutes outside the city of Rochester. Gananda is considered a community because it does not have its own zip code; it consists of a small portion of the adjoining towns of Walworth and Macedon. While originally designed to be a city with upwards of 90,000 residents, the removal of Housing and Urban Development (HUD) funding brought about its current design; as of the 2020 census, Gananda had a population of 5,867.

== Original design ==
Gananda was one of thirteen planned communities receiving federal guaranty assistance from HUD as part of their New Communities Program, created under the authority of the National Urban Policy and New Community Development Act of 1970. The original city of Gananda was to have occupied a total of 10,500 acres (42 km^{2}) and have an expected population of over 90,000 after 30 years. The city would have had approximately 17,000 houses, 12 neighborhood centers, 1 major regional shopping center, 3 smaller shopping centers and a system of recreational facilities containing swimming pools, playgrounds and open space for parks and buffer spaces between housing known as "Forever Wild". The state of New York created an all-new school district for the planned city, Gananda Central School District which had the unique ability to lease school facilities allowing for normal educational usage during school hours and community usage after hours. Today, the Gananda Central School District continues to serve approximately 1,200 students.

== Financial difficulties ==
The new city had its flag raising ceremony on September 20, 1973, with the school system operating out of the first of the completed educational and community facilities at 1500 Dayspring Ridge. The first graduating class from the new school system was the Class of 1974. By this point much of the underground infrastructure (water, power, gas, cable television and telephone) had been laid and work on major roadways was on schedule. Problems arose when the company in charge of building the new community, Gananda Development Corporation, ran into financial difficulties in the first and second quarters of 1973. The corporation did not meet liquidity requirements set out by HUD and applied for an additional $14,000,000 guaranty as it would be completely bankrupt by the first quarter of 1975 without the infusion. This was in addition to the original $22,000,000 guaranty from HUD. With the end of 1974 came the end of the City of Gananda. HUD denied any additional funding for Gananda and sold back all but 1,500 acres (6.1 km^{2}) of the proposed city.

== Remnants of the City of Gananda ==
When HUD finished terminating its interests in the project in 1977 the completed structures from the new city were one of the educational and community facilities, one of the community pools, one of the community parks, underground infrastructure (Electric, Water, Sewer, Gas and Cable TV) and a water treatment facility. The original educational and community facility housed the entire K-12 school system until the 1980s when Richard Mann Elementary was built on the site of the former community garden at 1366 Waterford Road. After renovations the HUD-financed facility contained grades 6-12 until the early 2000s, when the completion of Ruben A. Cirillo high school meant that the original building would only house grades 6-8 and the District offices. The single completed community pool was at 3290 Wildflower Drive and was operated by the community until the early 1990s when financial difficulties caused the property to be sold to the YMCA of Greater Rochester. It operated as a YMCA facility until the early 2000s when it shut down for the last time. The pool and original pool building still exist though now as part of a private residence. The community did not lose access to a public pool though as the opening of Ruben A. Cirillo high school also brought about major renovations and additions to Richard Mann Elementary, one of which was an indoor pool open to the public. The only completed public park was Fox Tail Park, located in the center of the area Wildflower drive encircles. It originally contained a full playground and sports fields of which only the sports fields remain (presently used by the Middle School). The playground was removed in the early 1990s for a new parking lot and gym addition on the present-day Middle school. In 2018 a new playground was built at the Gananda Elementary School. The older grass sports field was also replaced with AstroTurf, new track, bleachers, and security fencing. In addition to these buildings, Gananda is still unique from its neighboring towns in the sense that all utility lines are buried underground whereas once one leaves Gananda utilities are once again carried above ground by utility poles. When HUD discontinued its financial backing of the project the roadbed for both sides of a four-lane Gananda Parkway had already been constructed from Eddy Road to almost Walworth/Penfield Road, State Route 441 (itself slated to have been widened to a four-lane highway had the City of Gananda ever come to fruition). However, with funding from the original project gone, only one side was completed which forms the current Gananda Parkway. The roadbed for the other side of the original four-lane Gananda Parkway is still visible in person as well as via satellite imagery and an easement still exists if population growth ever warrants its completion.

== Demographics ==
=== 2020 census ===
As of the 2020 census, Gananda had a population of 5,867. The median age was 38.4 years. 26.9% of residents were under the age of 18 and 11.0% of residents were 65 years of age or older. For every 100 females there were 93.1 males, and for every 100 females age 18 and over there were 91.3 males age 18 and over.

0.0% of residents lived in urban areas, while 100.0% lived in rural areas.

There were 2,170 households in Gananda, of which 37.8% had children under the age of 18 living in them. Of all households, 62.1% were married-couple households, 10.8% were households with a male householder and no spouse or partner present, and 20.0% were households with a female householder and no spouse or partner present. About 18.8% of all households were made up of individuals and 7.5% had someone living alone who was 65 years of age or older.

There were 2,208 housing units, of which 1.7% were vacant. The homeowner vacancy rate was 0.3% and the rental vacancy rate was 0.6%.

Racial composition as of the 2020 census
Race	Number	Percent
White	5,305	90.4%
Black or African American	70	1.2%
American Indian and Alaska Native	4	0.1%
Asian	105	1.8%
Native Hawaiian and Other Pacific Islander	1	0.0%
Some other race	38	0.6%
Two or more races	344	5.9%
Hispanic or Latino (of any race)	197	3.4%
