= Macedon Center, New York =

Hamlet in New York, United States

Coordinates: 43°05′39″N 77°19′14″W

Macedon Center is a hamlet located within the Town of Macedon, Wayne County, New York, United States. It is located three miles (5 km) northwest of the hamlet of Macedon, at an elevation of 554 feet (169 m). The primary intersection in the hamlet is at N.Y. Route 31F, also known as Macedon Center Road, and Canandaigua Road.

Macedon Center Volunteer Fire Department hosts the annual Lumberjack Festival each September on their firemen's field.
