= Walworth (hamlet), New York =

Hamlet in New York, United States

Coordinates: 43°08′21″N 77°16′20″W

Walworth is a hamlet (and census-designated place) in the Town of Walworth, Wayne County, New York, United States. It is located in the southeastern corner of the town, six miles (10 km) north-northeast of the hamlet of Macedon, at an elevation of 541 feet (165 m). The primary cross roads where the hamlet is located are Penfield-Walworth Road (CR 205), Walworth-Marion Road (CR 207), Walworth-Ontario Road and Walworth Road (CR 208). N.Y. Route 350 passes just west of Walworth. Government offices for the Town of Walworth are located in the hamlet.

A United States Post Office is located in Walworth with a ZIP Code of 14568.

== History ==
The hamlet was originally known as Douglass Corners from 1801 to 1825, named after brothers Stephen and Daniel Douglass who settled in the area.
