= Charles Bullis House =

Historic house in New York, United States

- U.S. National Register of Historic Places
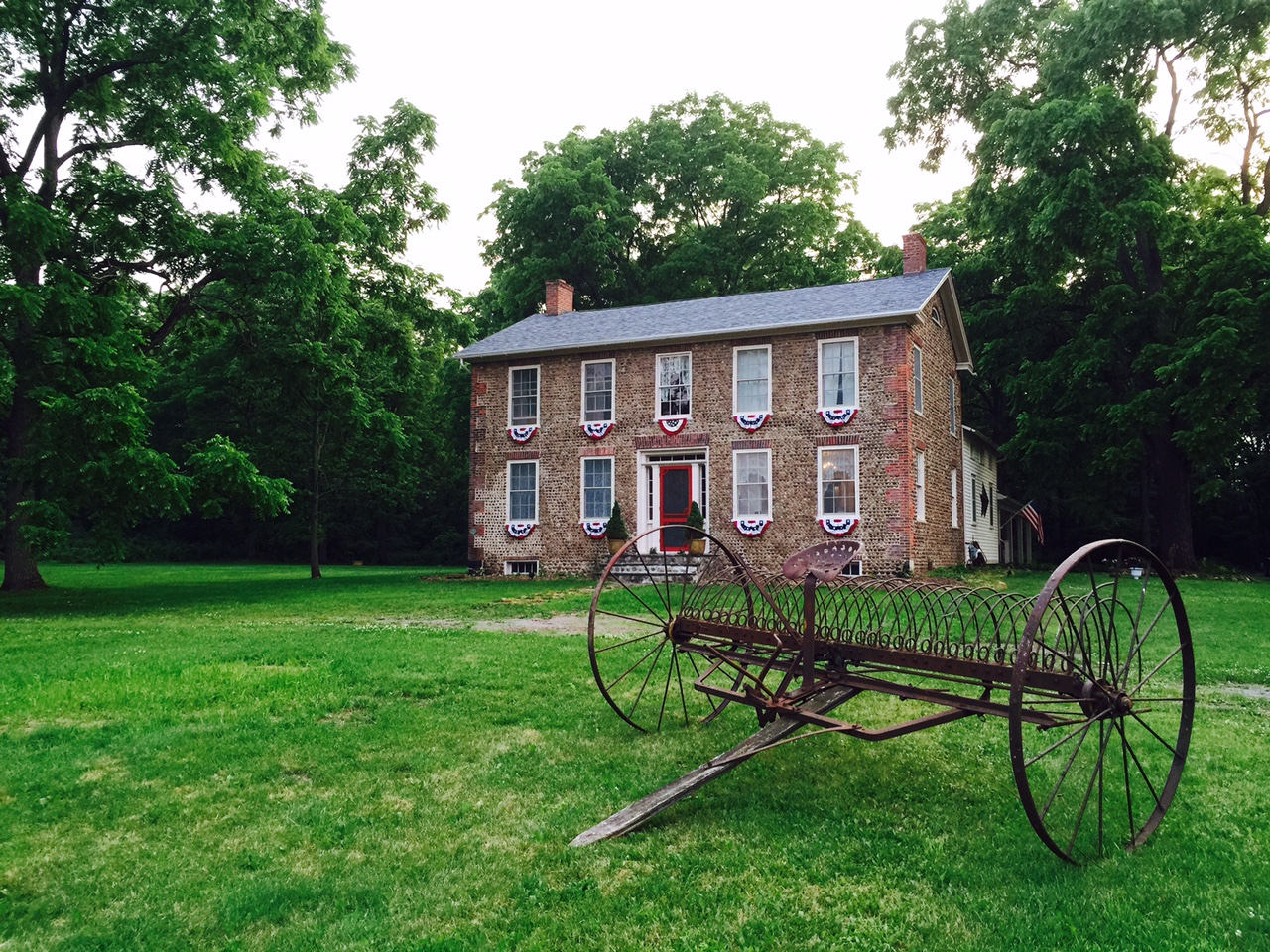
- Charles Bullis House, July 2015

- Location within New York Location within the United States
- Map showing the location of Charles Bullis House
- Location: 1727 Canandaigua Rd., Macedon, New York
- Coordinates: 43°4′10″N 77°19′14″W
- Area: 6 acres (2.4 ha)
- Built: 1839-42
- Architectural style: Greek Revival, Federal, Cobblestone house
- NRHP reference No.: 86000483
- Added to NRHP: March 20, 1986

Charles Bullis House is a historic home located at Macedon in Wayne County, New York. The Federal style, cobblestone house consists of a 2-story main block with a 1 1/2-story frame wing. It was built about 1839 and is constructed of irregular, rough, moderate sized cobbles. The house is among the approximately 170 surviving cobblestone buildings in Wayne County.

It was listed on the National Register of Historic Places in 1986.

== Historical significance ==
The Charles Bullis House (1839–42) is a well-preserved, architecturally significant representative example of nineteenth century cobblestone residential architecture. Cobblestone construction in the pre-Civil War period is almost exclusively found in the Western and Central New York region. One of the 170 surviving cobblestone buildings in Wayne County, its design incorporates both Federal and Greek Revival style features, as was common in vernacular buildings of the 1830s. The location of the house reflects the typical pattern of nineteenth century settlement of Wayne County. The farm site is situated adjacent to the Barge Canal (originally, the Erie Canal) on a major historic north–south road linking the village of Macedon and Macedon Center with the Lake Ontario shore, and one-half mile from the principal and historic east–west travel route (Rt. 31) traversing the southern portion of Wayne County. The house remained virtually intact and under the ownership of the Bullis Family until 1984.

Charles H. Bullis, his wife Ellen, and children, Abraham, Emma, and Keley, left Manchester Vermont in November 1838 to journey west to settle in Ohio. They traveled across New York State by canal boat on the Erie Canal and stopped at Macedon to visit Charles's sister. They decided to settle there, and, on April 1, 1839, Charles purchased a 59-acre farm adjacent to the Erie Canal from Charles and Lydia Smith for $2,631.64.

Little is known about Charles Bullis. Like many farmers from New England, Bullis presumably left the rocky soils of Vermont to seek richer farm lands. In Macedon, Wayne County, he found a milder climate, fertile soils enriched by the nearby Mud Creek, which were favorable for growing wheat and corn and raising livestock, as well as the convenience of conveying produce to markets by canal. In addition, the property was only one-half mile from the main east–west road which ran between Pittsford and Palmyra, and situated on a major north–south road to the Lake Ontario shore.

When the Bullis family first settled on the farm, it is believed that they lived in a small, one-story frame building that had been moved from a former Erie Canal work camp settlement located on the property near the canal to the site of the present frame ell on the west side of the main portion of the house. During the 1983 restoration, the east wall of the existing frame ell was removed, exposing the west wall of the cobblestone house. The outline of a one-story frame building was evident as large stones and rough mortar filled the space within the outline, indicating an inside wall; above the outline showed the finished cobblestone which was originally the outside wall of the main house. Construction of the main cobblestone house began in 1839 and was completed in 1842. It is believed that the family gathered small fieldstones on the farm for the construction. The solidification of the mortar was a much slower process than the hard, fast-drying Portland cement of today. Work on the enlargement of the Erie Canal was also in progress, and the mason working on the Bullis House may have also been a canal worker.

The existing one-and-half story ell replaced the original frame structure about 1845, based upon material evidence excavated by archeologists from the Rochester Museum and Science Center in 1979. Stone foundations of another structure attached to the ell were revealed and dated about 1855.

In 1863 Charles Bullis deeded the property to his son, Dr. Abraham Bullis, who lived and practiced medicine in the neighboring town of Farmington. Charles's wife Ellen and his daughter Emma retained life use of the house, until 1879 and 1905 respectively. In 1866 upon the death of both Charles and Abraham, the property was passed on to Abraham's son Abraham R. Bullis (1854-1928), who was a civil engineer. His children, Charles and Nettie, retained ownership of the property until their deaths in 1974 and 1979 respectively. Six of the 59 acres (approximately ten acres were taken for the canal and railroad rights of way) were bequeathed to the Landmark Society, while the remaining acreage was left to the town of Macedon (now Bullis Park). In 1984, the property was sold as a single family home.

The Charles Bullis House is significant as a distinctive example of early nineteenth century cobblestone architecture. This construction technique is primarily found in Central and Western New York and appears to be the result of both geologic and historic factors. Cobble-sized stones, deposited by the Ice Age glacier about 40,000 years ago, are abundant along the southern Ontario Lake plain. According to a study by Robert Roudabush, approximately 60% of more than 660 cobblestone buildings in New York State are located in an area between the Genesee River and Syracuse, which has an abundance of drumlins and other major stone deposits.

Another geologic factor important to the cobblestone architecture phenomenon is the presence of limestone outcroppings found in this region. The lime processed from the rock was used in making hydraulic cement for the construction of the Erie Canal and was a primary ingredient for making mortar used in cobblestone construction. The men who built cobblestone structures are believed to have been skilled masons who worked on the Erie Canal, from its initial construction (1817-1825) through its periods of enlargement (1832-1862). In fact, the period of cobblestone architecture coincides with the period of Erie Canal construction and reconstruction: the earliest structures built about 1825 and the last erected about 1860.

The Charles Bullis House exemplifies the early period of cobblestone architecture (approximately 1825–1845), characterized by rows of rough, rounded field stones of irregular shape and moderate size, and separated by horizontal mortar joints in the shape of a projecting V-shape. While most cobblestone structures had quoins and lintels of limestone or sandstone, the Charles Bullis House is one of only eight cobblestone buildings in Wayne County with brick quoins and lintels.

While cobblestone buildings were constructed for a variety of uses including churches, schools, stores, barns, smokehouses, and others, most cobblestone buildings were farmhouses, erected after farmers had cleared their lands of forests (and fieldstones) for cash crops. The farmers became prosperous from the markets made available by the canal and many took advantage of the abundance of cobblestones and skilled masons to build these distinctive homes.
.

Although built in 1839, during the period when the Greek Revival style was predominant, the Charles Bullis House, like many cobblestone farmhouses erected before 1840, retains the plan and massing of the Federal style and is refined with both Federal and Greek Revival style details. The house's characteristic Federal elements include the rectangular plan, low pitched roof, symmetrically spaced windows, semi-elliptical louvered fans in the gables, inside rectangular chimneys located at the gable ends, quoins, and window lintels with splayed ends. Although the cornice is narrow, following the Federal style, the moldings are Greek Revival in scale. The doorway is well-proportioned, with sidelights and narrow pilasters, but contains a simply glazed architrave instead of a more elegant Federal style fanlight. Inside the architrave trim moldings throughout most of the house and the two simple fireplace mantels reflect the Greek Revival influence. The simple, but elegant, stair banister and the molded trim and block corner moldings found in the southeast room on the first floor are also typical Federal details.
