= Freeman Hopkins =

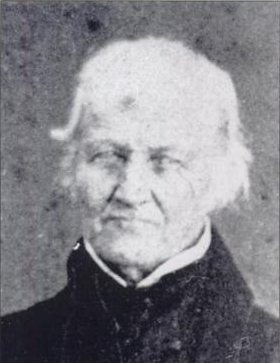
Freeman Hopkins

Freeman Hopkins (1779–1856) was a Quaker and the first settler of Ontario, New York. He was a 5th generation American. His 4th great-grandfather was Stephen Hopkins, a passenger on the Mayflower along with his son Giles, who was his 3rd great-grandfather. He was the son of Freeman Hopkins Sr. and Hannah Cole. Freeman and his wife Martha Patterson, daughter of Charles Patterson and Martha Hall, came to Ontario in the Spring of 1806 from Rhode Island. In 1807 the town of Ontario was founded from a part of the neighboring town of Williamson, and was originally called "Freetown" after Mr. Hopkins.

During the War of 1812 Hopkins left the area and returned to Rhode Island due to the Quakers testimony against participation in wars, and to avoid the hostilities that took place on Lake Ontario. In 1818 the family returned to Ontario.

Martha Patterson Hopkins was born in Mount Washington, Berkshire County, Massachusetts about 1785.

Freeman Hopkins built the first sawmill in the town, and his daughter, Melissa's birth on May 7, 1806, was the first in Ontario. He later went on to father a total of nine children. Sadly, Freeman Hopkins came to an unfortunate end. After becoming blind in his later years, he drowned himself in his cistern.
