= Gananda Central School District =

School district in New York, United States

Coordinates: 43.113959°N 77.335377°W

The Gananda Central School District is a public school district in New York State located about 20 miles east of Rochester’s city center and serves approximately 900 students in the master-planned development of Gananda, which is in the towns of Macedon and Walworth in Wayne County with a staff of 200 (112 teachers and 90 support staff) and an annual budget of approximately $24 million.

The average class size is 200 students (all grades). The student-teacher ratio is 14:1.

Dr. Shawn Van Scoy is the Superintendent for all schools in the district.

The district motto is "Educating All Students For Success".

== Board of education ==
The Board of Education (BOE) consists of 7 members, 7 who serve rotating 3-year terms. Elections are held each May for board members and to vote on the School District Budget.

Board members (2022) are:

- Greg Giles- President
- Patty Walker- Vice President
- Lisa Finnegan
- Shauna Phillips
- Bill Buchko
- Mike Cardarelli
- Robin Vogt
- Leslie Ferrante - District Clerk

== History ==
The Gananda Central School District opened its doors to 108 students in 1974 and has grown since then as the population of suburban Rochester has grown.

In 2022, Middle School Principal, Eliott Butt won the WROC-TV Golden Apple award.

== Schools ==
The district operates 3 schools, all located in the town of Walworth.

=== Elementary schools ===
- Richard Mann Elementary School (K-5), Principal - Katy Lumb

=== Middle schools ===
- Gananda Middle School (6-8), Principal - Elliot Butt

=== High schools ===
- Ruben A. Cirillo High School (9-12), Principal - Christopher Whipple

== Performance ==
The district's 96% graduation rate exceeds the State Standard of 55%.
