= First Presbyterian Church of Ontario Center =

Historic church in New York, United States

- U.S. National Register of Historic Places
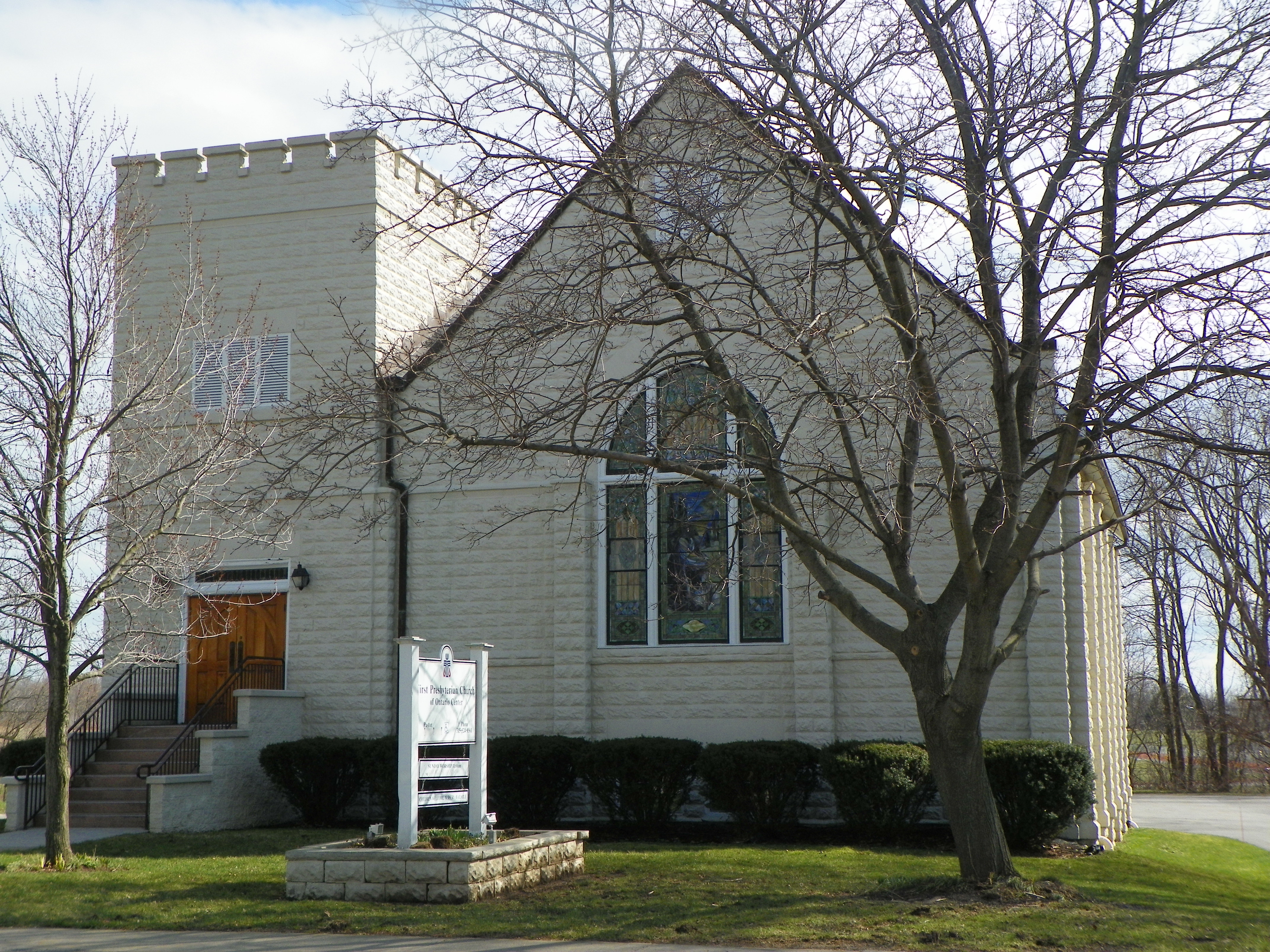
- First Presbyterian Church of Ontario Center, April 2013

- Location within New York Location within the United States
- Location: 1638 Ridge Rd., Ontario Center, New York
- Coordinates: 43°13′31″N 77°18′6″W
- Area: 1.2 acres (0.49 ha)
- Built: 1914
- Architectural style: Tudor Revival
- NRHP reference No.: 98000665
- Added to NRHP: June 03, 1998

First Presbyterian Church of Ontario Center is a historic Presbyterian church located at Ontario Center in Wayne County, New York. It was built in 1914 and is a Tudor Revival style concrete block church cast to resemble rusticated masonry. It is roughly square in plan and topped by a cross gable roof. The front facade features a massive square corner tower capped with a crenelated parapet.

It was listed on the National Register of Historic Places in 1998.

The building was purchased and renovated as an event space by Sanctuary on Ridge, a wedding and event venue company. It opened in October 2024.

== Gallery ==
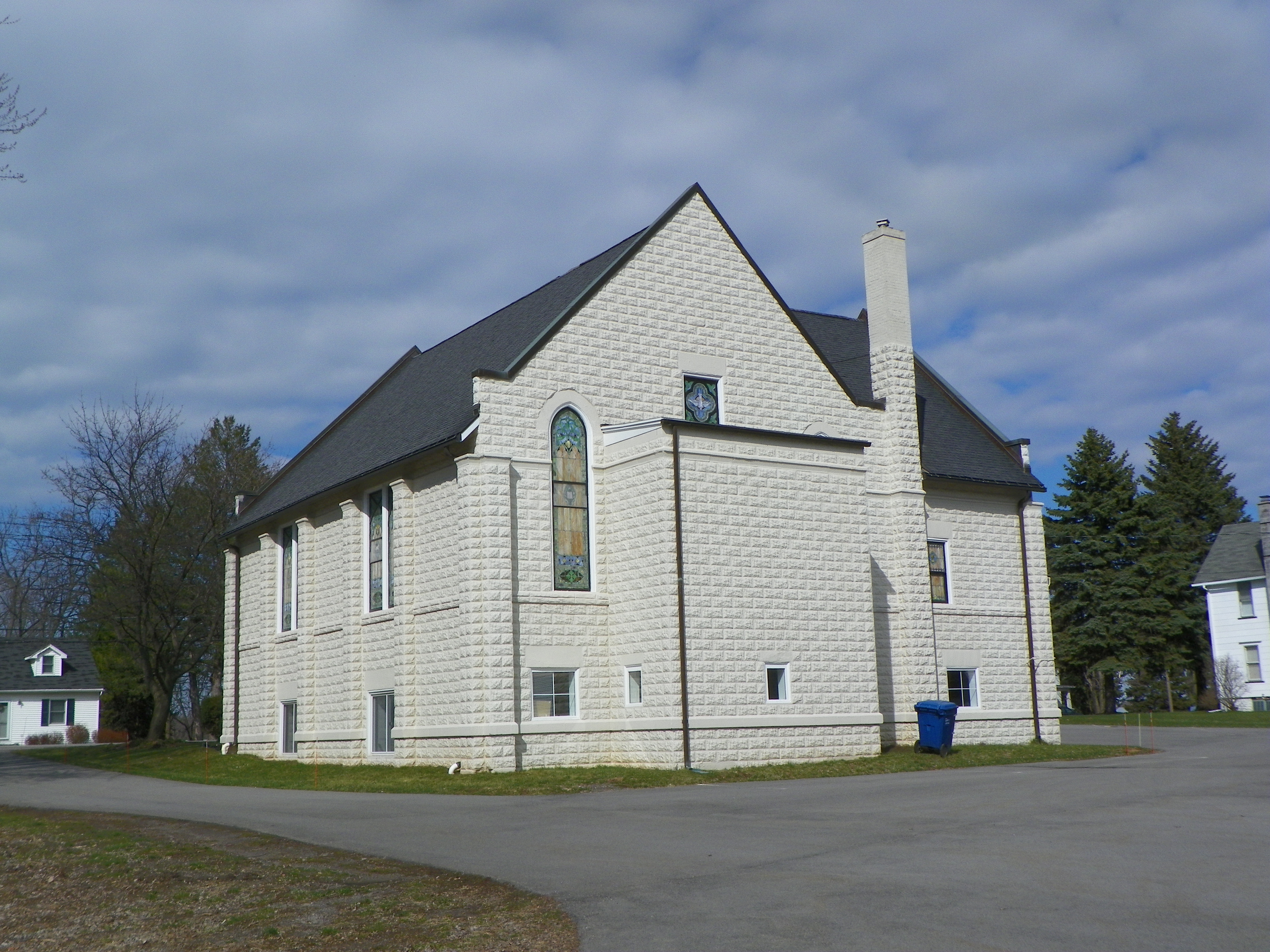
Rear view of the First Presbyterian Church of Ontario Center, NY
