= Charles Livingston Bull =

American illustrator

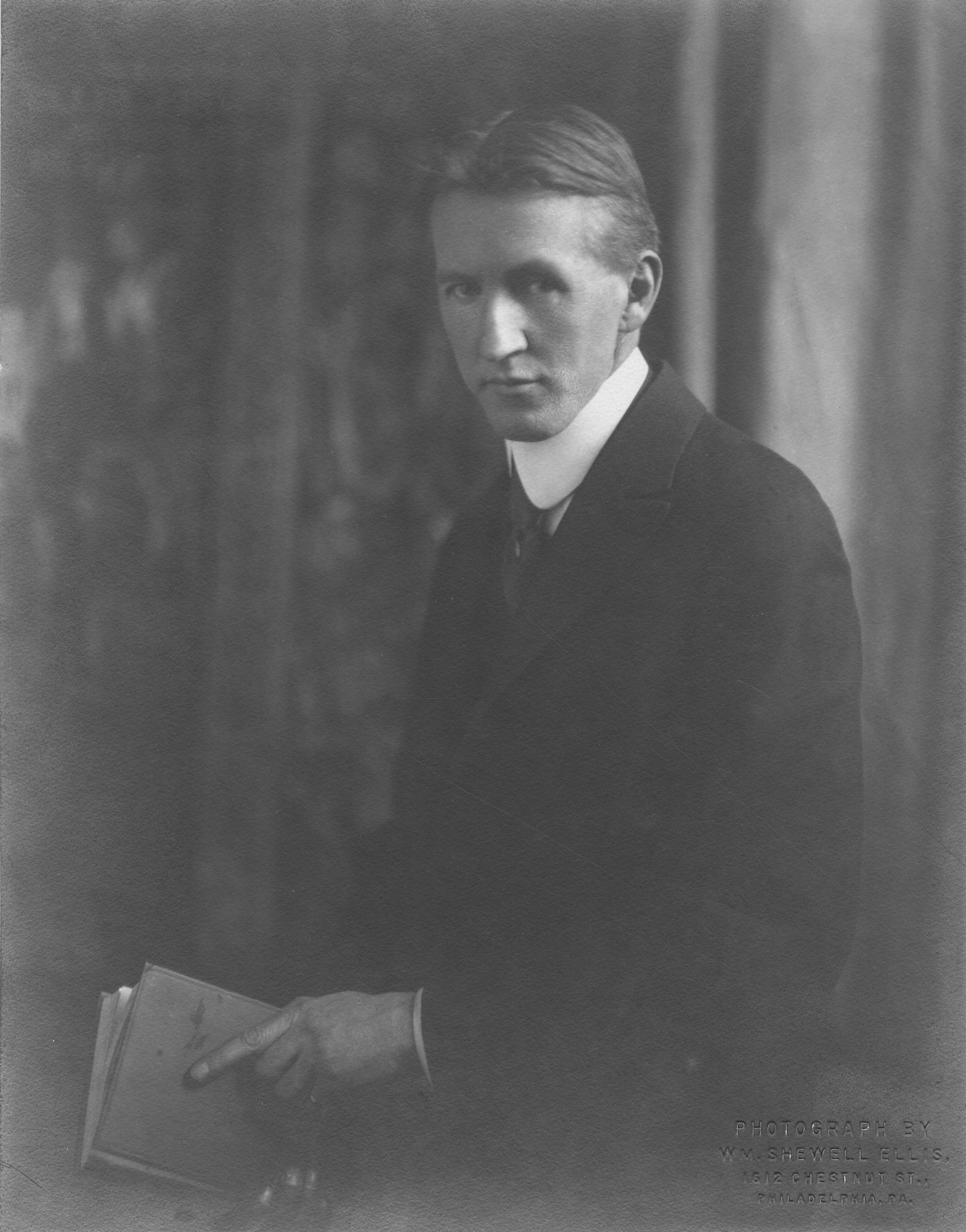
- Born: Charles Livingston Bull; May 1874; West Walworth, New York, U.S.
- Died: 1932 (aged 57–58); Oradell, New Jersey, U.S.
- Known for: Illustration

Charles Livingston Bull (1874–1932) was an American illustrator. Bull studied taxidermy in Rochester, New York and is known for his illustration of wildlife.

== Career ==
Bull's first job at the age of 16 was preparing animals for mounting at the Ward's Museum in Rochester, New York. He later worked as a taxidermist in Washington, D.C., specializing in anatomy of birds and animals.

During World War I, he designed propaganda posters to support the American war effort. A notable example is a recruiting poster titled Join the Army Air Service. Be an American eagle! which featured an eagle fighting a black bird. Another example is Keep Him Free, featuring a majestic Bald Eagle guarding a nest of World War I biplanes, which was designed to raise money via the War Savings Stamps program.

Bull lived for many years near the Bronx Zoo in New York to allow close access to be able to sketch living animals. He made many trips to Central and South America studying wildlife in their natural surrounding. Stories and illustrations for this trip were published in his book, Under the Roof of the Jungle. He made many drawings to help garner public interest in eagles.

Bull was a resident of Oradell, New Jersey and donated several of his works to the Oradell Public Library.

In 1920 he created seven illustrations for the book of William J. Long, Wood-Folk comedies, published by Harper & Brothers Publishers of New York and London.

== Gallery ==
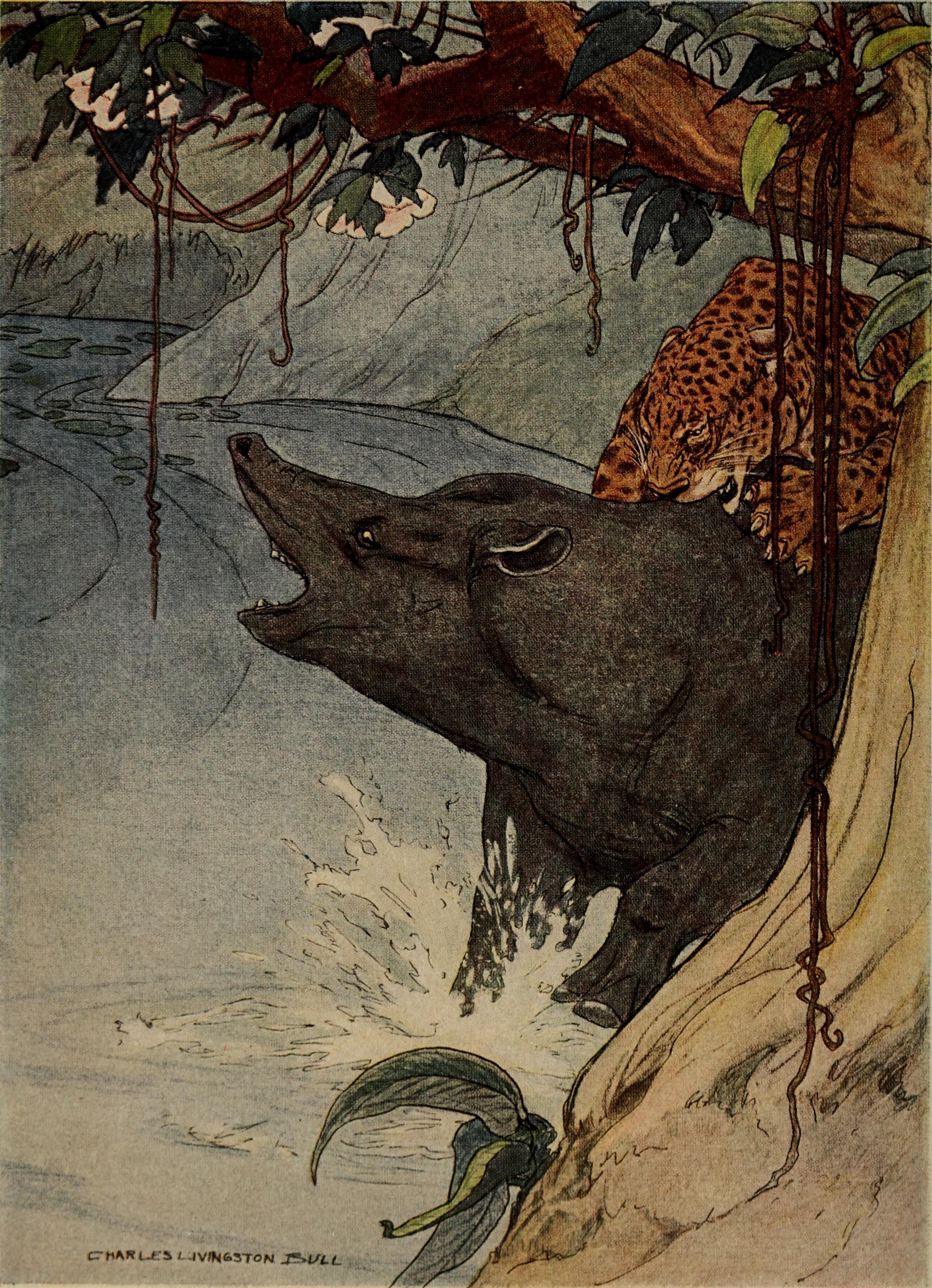
Outing illustration

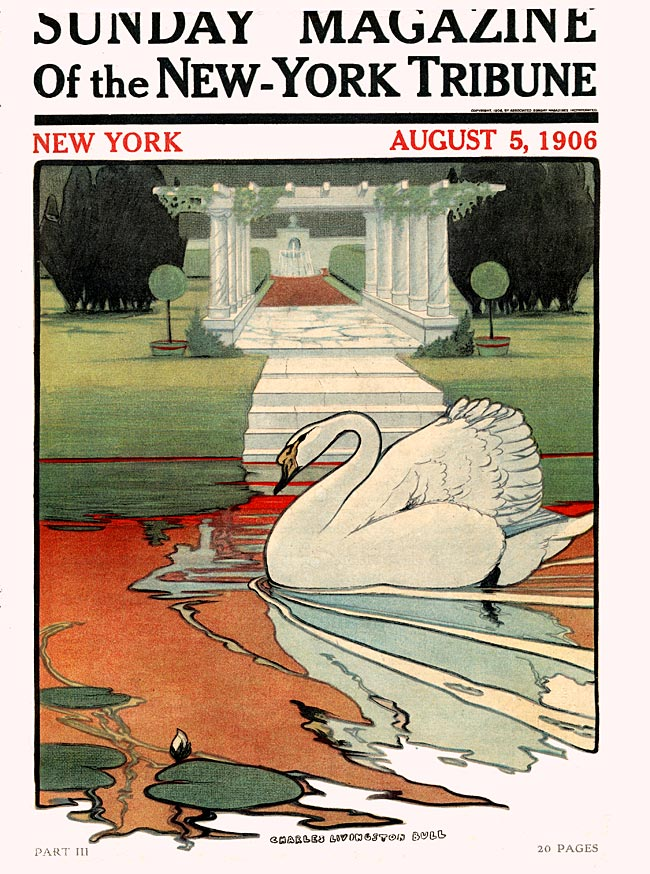
Sunday Mazazine of the New York Tribune Magazine Cover August 5, 1906

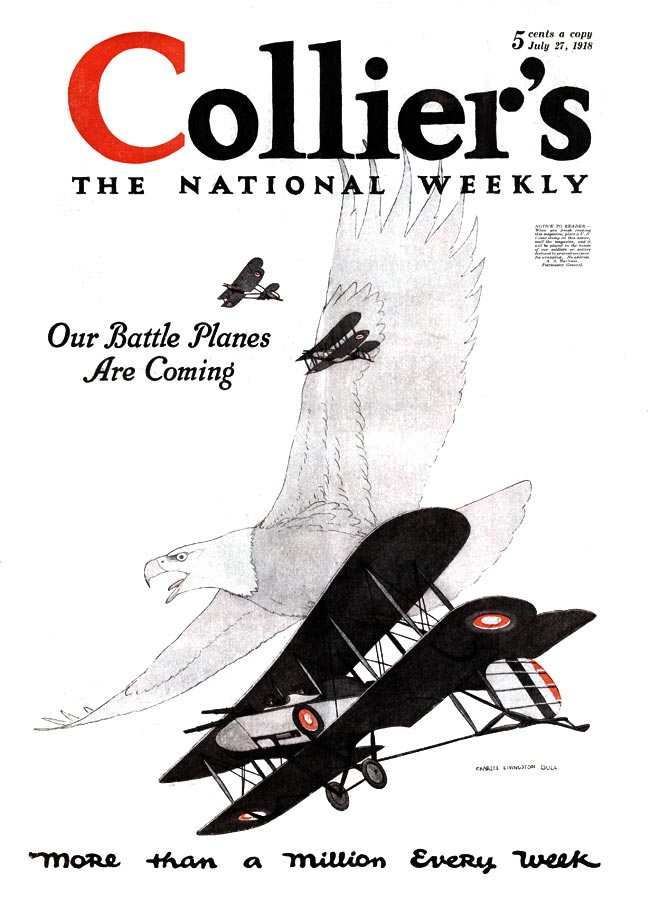
Collier's Magazine Cover July 27, 1918

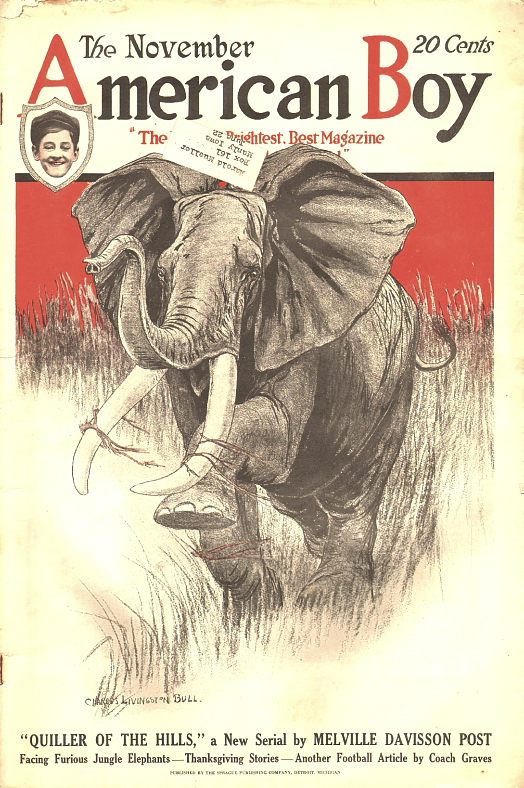
The American Boy Magazine Cover November 1921

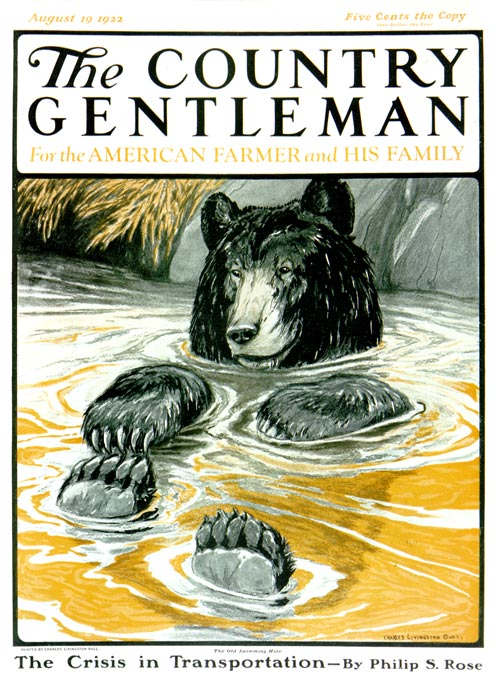
The Country Gentleman Magazine Cover August 19, 1922

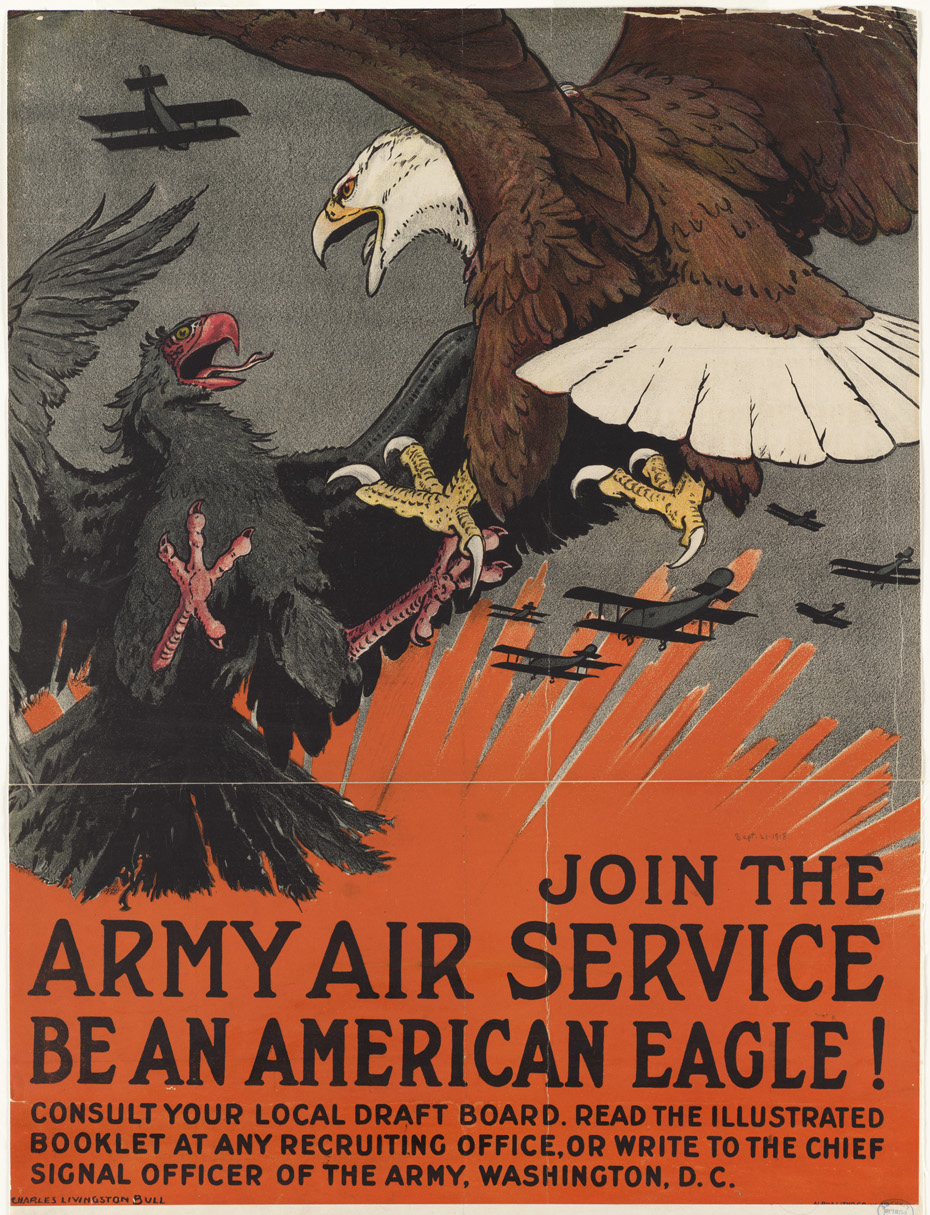
World War I recruiting poster. "Be an American eagle!"

== See also ==
- Animal Fairy Tales
- William J. Long
- Charles G.D. Roberts
- National Museum of American Illustration
