= R. E. Ginna Nuclear Power Plant =

Nuclear power plant in Ontario, US

Ginna nuclear power plant
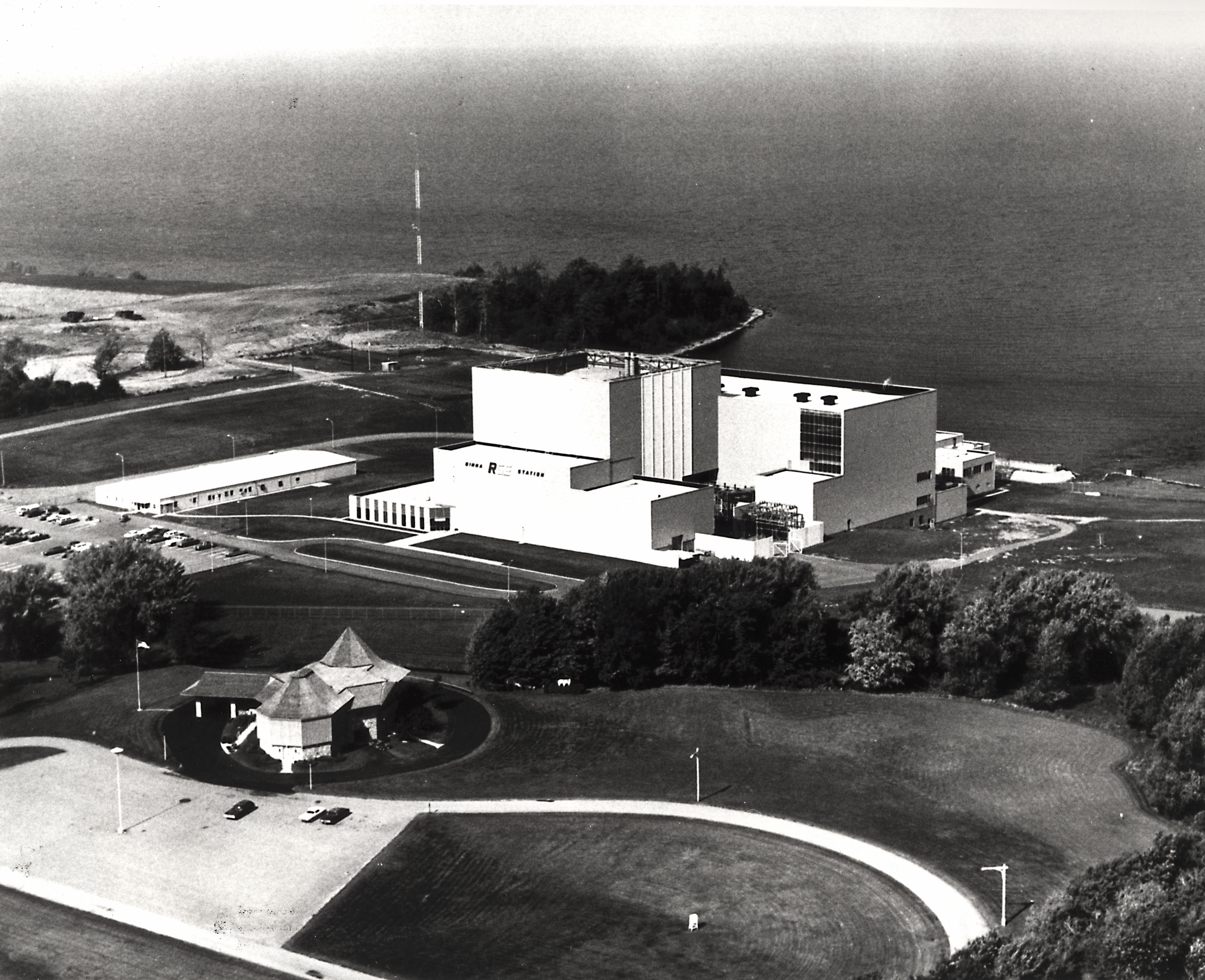
- Ginna nuclear power plant
- Country: United States
- Location: Ontario, New York
- Coordinates: 43°16′40″N 77°18′36″W
- Status: Operational
- Construction began: April 25, 1966; 60 years ago
- Commission date: June 1, 1970; 56 years ago
- Construction cost: $346.15 million (2007 USD)
- Owner: Constellation Energy
- Operator: Constellation Energy

Nuclear power station
- Reactor type: PWR
- Reactor supplier: Westinghouse
- Cooling source: Lake Ontario

Power generation
- Units operational: 1 × 580 MW
- Nameplate capacity: 580 MW
- Annual net output: 4732 GWh (2021)

External links
- Website: Ginna Nuclear Power Plant
- Commons: Related media on Commons

The Robert Emmett Ginna Nuclear Power Plant, commonly known as Ginna (/ɡɪˈneɪ/ ghih-NAY), is a nuclear power plant located on the southern shore of Lake Ontario, in the town of Ontario, Wayne County, New York, United States, approximately 20 miles (32 km) east of Rochester, New York. It is a single unit Westinghouse 2-Loop pressurized water reactor, similar to those at Point Beach, Kewaunee, and Prairie Island. Having gone into commercial operation in 1970, Ginna became the second oldest nuclear power reactor, after Nine Mile unit 1, still in operation in the United States when the Oyster Creek power plant was permanently shut down on September 17, 2018.

== History ==
The plant was named after Robert Emmett Ginna, a former chief executive of Rochester Gas & Electric, who was one of the nation's earliest advocates of using nuclear energy to generate electricity.

Ginna is owned and operated by Constellation Energy following separation from Exelon in 2022. Constellation, prior to merger with Exelon purchased it from Rochester Gas and Electric in 2004.

The Ginna plant was the site of a nuclear accident when, on January 25, 1982, a small amount of radioactive steam leaked into the air after a steam-generator tube ruptured. The leak, which lasted 93 minutes, led to the declaration of a site emergency. The rupture was caused by a small pie-pan-shaped object left in the steam generator during an outage. This was not the first time a tube rupture had occurred at an American reactor but following on so closely behind the Three Mile Island accident caused considerable attention to be focused on the incident at the Ginna plant. In total, 485.3 curies of noble gas and 1.15 millicuries of iodine-131 were released to the environment and 1,690 US gallons (6,400 L; 1,410 imp gal) of contaminated water was lost from the reactor.

In 1996 the original Westinghouse supplied steam generators (including the one that was damaged in 1982 and repaired) were replaced by two brand new Babcock & Wilcox steam generators. This project enabled an uprating of Ginna's output several years later and was a major factor in the approval of the plant's operating license extension for 20 years beyond the original license (originally valid until 2009).

== Electricity production ==
Generation (MWh) of R.E. Ginna Nuclear Power Plant
Year	Jan	Feb	Mar	Apr	May	Jun	Jul	Aug	Sep	Oct	Nov	Dec	Annual (Total)
2001	363,157	333,798	352,214	357,305	369,403	351,793	359,110	357,953	348,927	366,030	356,796	369,242	4,285,728
2002	369,437	309,639	167,286	110,696	368,745	354,854	358,597	357,515	336,869	366,674	357,224	369,312	3,826,848
2003	369,157	333,040	358,284	357,078	370,018	355,741	361,548	317,417	149,717	165,598	357,350	369,071	3,864,019
2004	368,981	345,506	369,581	357,110	368,969	359,679	363,554	360,422	351,488	338,115	358,159	370,379	4,311,943
2005	371,538	308,251	231,144	221,167	370,006	352,150	344,889	356,950	339,371	371,222	360,373	371,152	3,998,213
2006	370,750	335,216	371,075	359,071	371,293	354,770	359,643	358,382	354,162	85,503	366,516	433,293	4,119,674
2007	391,257	387,834	401,525	418,284	423,302	409,952	409,867	419,625	408,689	411,515	417,479	431,199	4,930,528
2008	431,274	403,434	430,630	274,251	261,037	413,782	419,771	418,979	410,902	428,998	417,387	432,381	4,742,826
2009	432,130	390,108	431,376	413,772	336,937	415,529	422,912	417,308	174,390	375,579	413,995	406,867	4,630,903
2010	340,553	388,412	431,703	418,154	430,836	411,637	417,520	421,282	409,225	429,647	417,397	431,997	4,948,363
2011	429,794	389,941	431,777	317,753	0	275,078	417,081	418,559	411,333	368,958	385,844	432,414	4,278,532
2012	432,520	404,390	431,961	418,365	430,825	411,946	418,054	414,834	406,077	285,706	116,230	430,811	4,601,719
2013	432,767	390,729	432,514	419,309	432,300	414,881	363,935	418,663	407,739	428,096	419,261	433,102	4,993,296
2014	424,520	390,493	432,045	371,081	105,955	417,293	423,190	407,687	411,411	427,554	418,641	432,625	4,662,495
2015	432,353	390,466	431,859	418,743	431,027	416,419	423,337	426,923	418,624	245,231	328,898	437,511	4,801,391
2016	438,041	409,814	437,839	417,497	430,574	412,175	426,117	417,886	404,918	427,365	417,058	431,039	5,070,323
2017	431,281	389,833	430,885	298,362	210,016	412,085	420,460	419,606	408,610	427,257	417,573	431,707	4,697,675
2018	431,746	389,920	388,055	418,273	431,906	415,493	412,470	417,553	408,858	257,347	290,620	427,199	4,689,440
2019	431,412	390,119	430,988	417,825	431,766	361,140	418,815	420,587	411,409	429,922	417,947	431,763	4,993,693
2020	432,047	404,201	429,197	62,644	72,039	413,348	416,834	415,553	408,485	428,428	418,270	431,842	4,332,888
2021	432,048	390,196	431,443	418,048	430,618	413,188	451,712	417,592	406,823	91,809	418,304	430,946	4,732,727
2022	432,313	390,539	431,723	418,326	431,515	412,419	418,928	415,491	409,057	428,903	417,562	431,812	5,048,588
2023	431,587	389,818	429,586	115,363	418,835	415,789	405,486	418,898	371,564	398,486	417,618	431,923	4,544,953
2024	431,854	404,169	431,144	417,495	429,388	410,920	416,761	417,616	384,740	206,470	416,973	431,556	4,799,086
2025	431,649	388,949	430,965	417,380	430,242	414,028	417,527	421,806	408,317	427,341	416,543	430,051	5,034,798
2026	429,445	388,806	391,274	134,277	429,111	412,028	419,508	416,152					--

== Surrounding population ==
The Nuclear Regulatory Commission defines two emergency planning zones around nuclear power plants: a plume exposure pathway zone with a radius of 10 miles (16 km), concerned primarily with exposure to, and inhalation of, airborne radioactive contamination, and an ingestion pathway zone of about 50 miles (80 km), concerned primarily with ingestion of food and liquid contaminated by radioactivity.

The 2010 U.S. population within 10 miles (16 km) of Ginna was 66,847, an increase of 12.7 percent in a decade, according to an analysis of U.S. Census data for msnbc.com. The 2010 U.S. population within 50 miles (80 km) was 1,269,589, an increase of 2.1 percent since 2000. Cities within 50 miles include Rochester (17 miles to city center). Canadian population is not included in these figures.

== Seismic risk ==
The Nuclear Regulatory Commission's estimate of the risk each year of an earthquake intense enough to cause core damage to the reactor at Ginna was 1 in 76,923, according to an NRC study published in August 2010.

== See also ==
- New York energy law
- Pickering Nuclear Generating Station 153 kilometres (95 mi) northwest across Lake Ontario.
- Darlington Nuclear Generating Station 125 kilometres (78 mi) northwest across Lake Ontario.
