= Ontario Heritage Square =

Historic district in New York, United States

- Brick Church Corners
- U.S. National Register of Historic Places
- U.S. Historic district
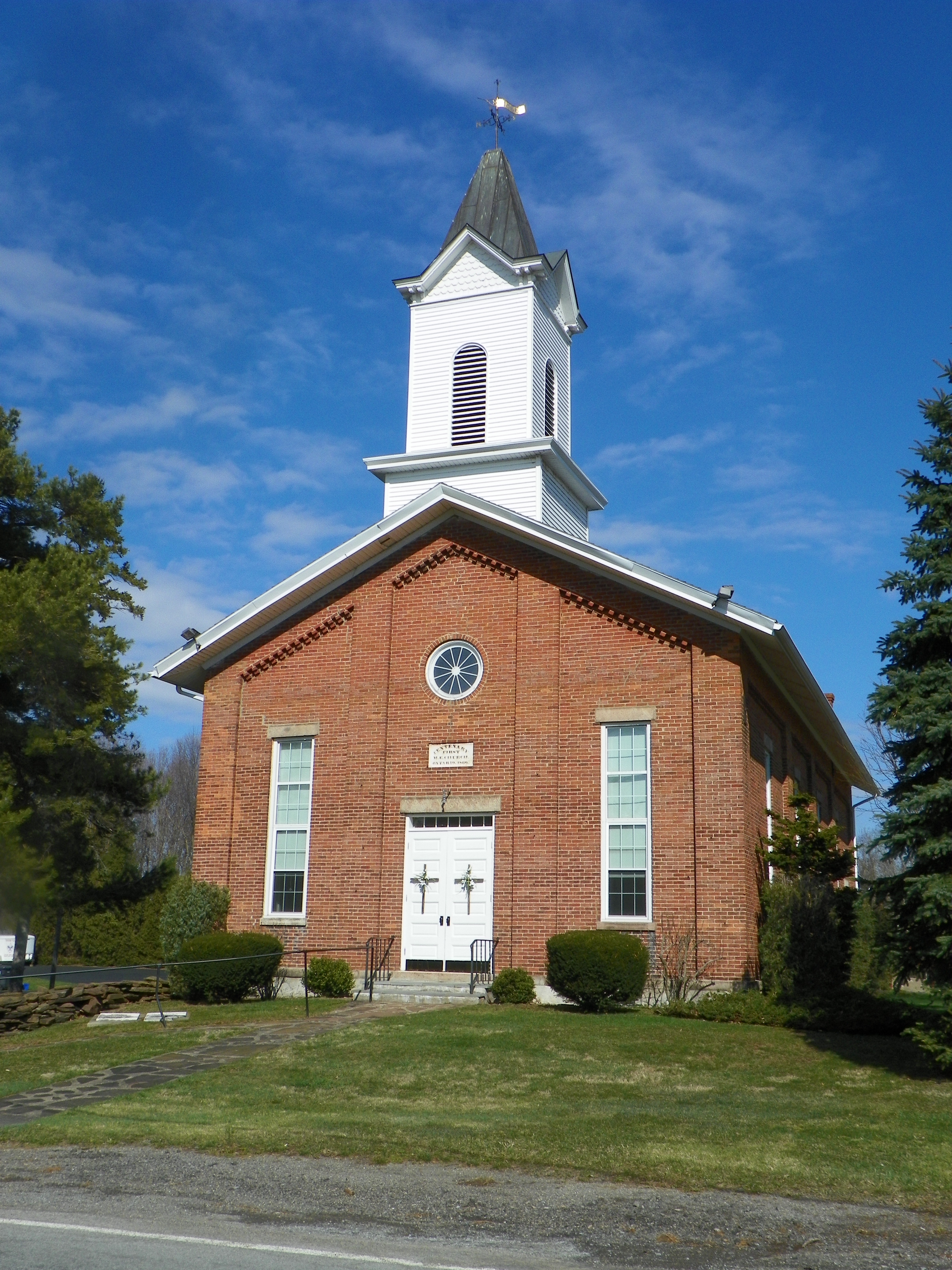
- North Ontario Methodist Church

- Location within New York Location within the United States
- Location: Jct. of Brick Church and Ontario Center Rds., Ontario, New York
- Coordinates: 43°15′27″N 77°18′21″W
- Area: 30 acres (12 ha)
- NRHP reference No.: 74001317
- Added to NRHP: June 05, 1974

Ontario Heritage Square, officially known as Heritage Square Museum, is a museum in Ontario, New York in Wayne County, New York. It is located at the site of the Brick Church Corners, a historic district listed on the National Register of Historic Places in 1973.

The district includes the North Ontario Methodist Church, the Pease-Micha Homestead, the Schoolhouse District No. 4, the Ruffell Log Cabin, and the site of a 19th-century sawmill and house.

The museum includes several other buildings that have been moved to the site.

== Gallery ==
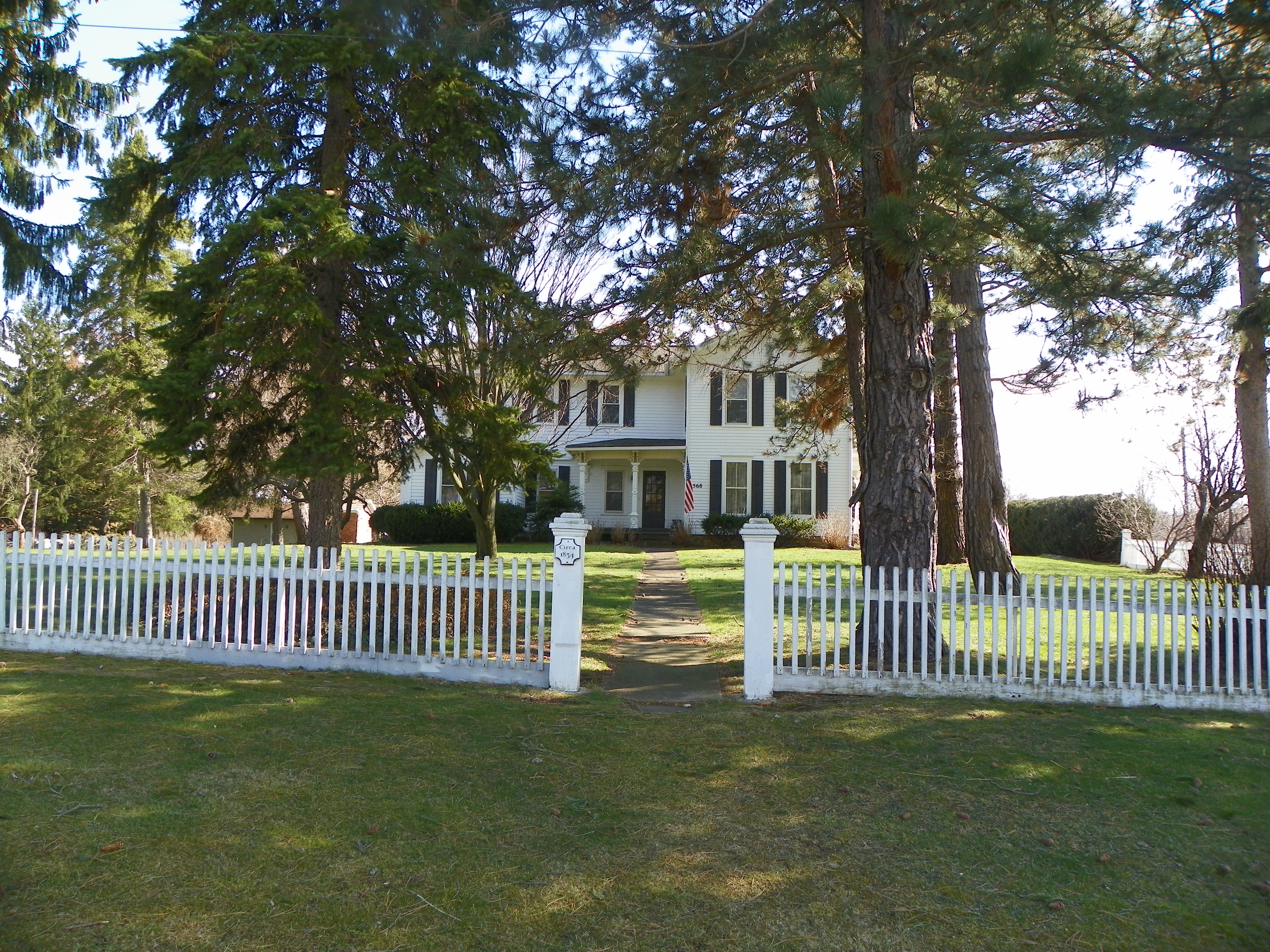
Pease-Micha Homestead, part of the Brick Church Corners historic district

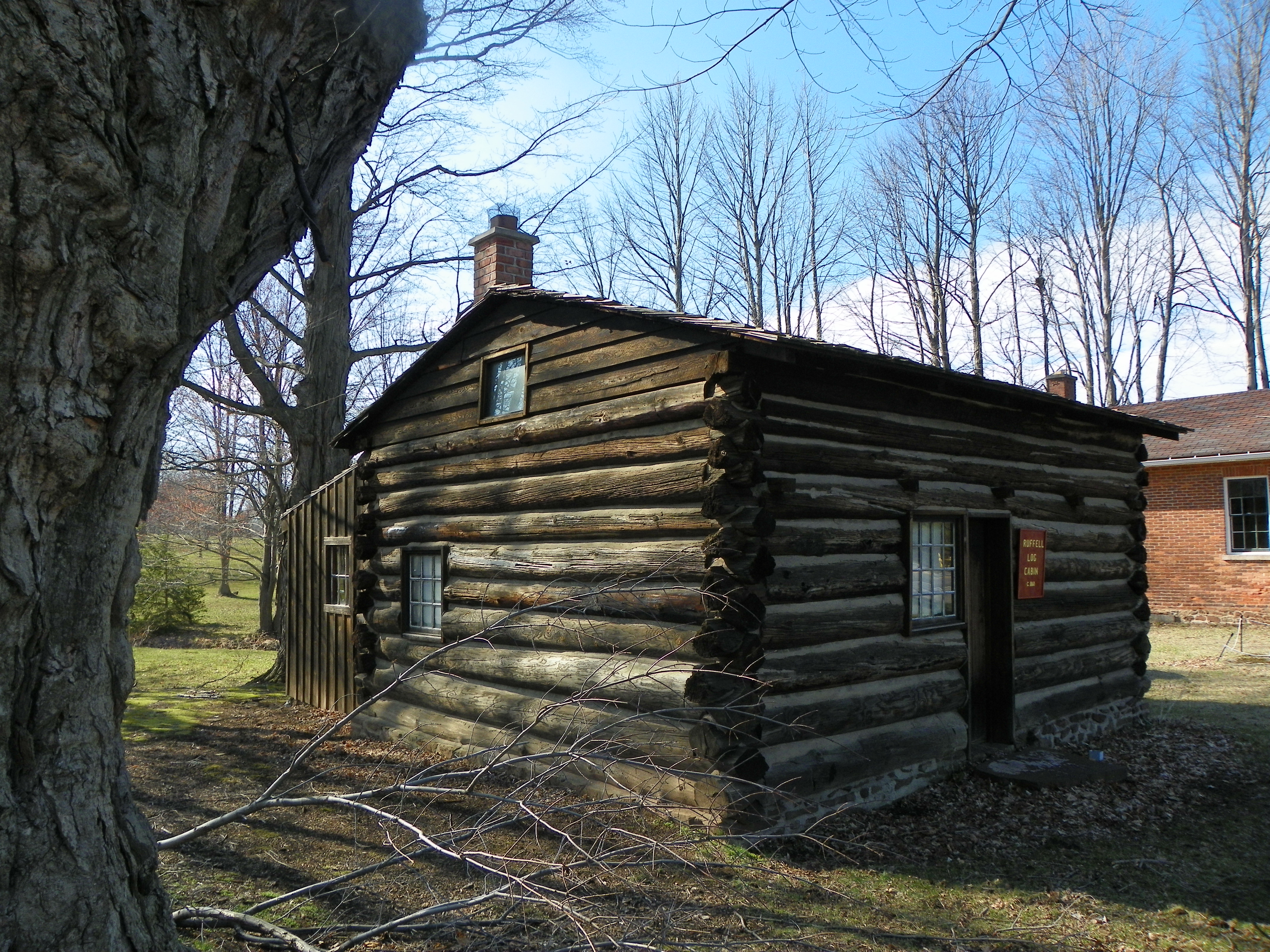
Ruffell Log Cabin, part of the Brick Church Corners historic district

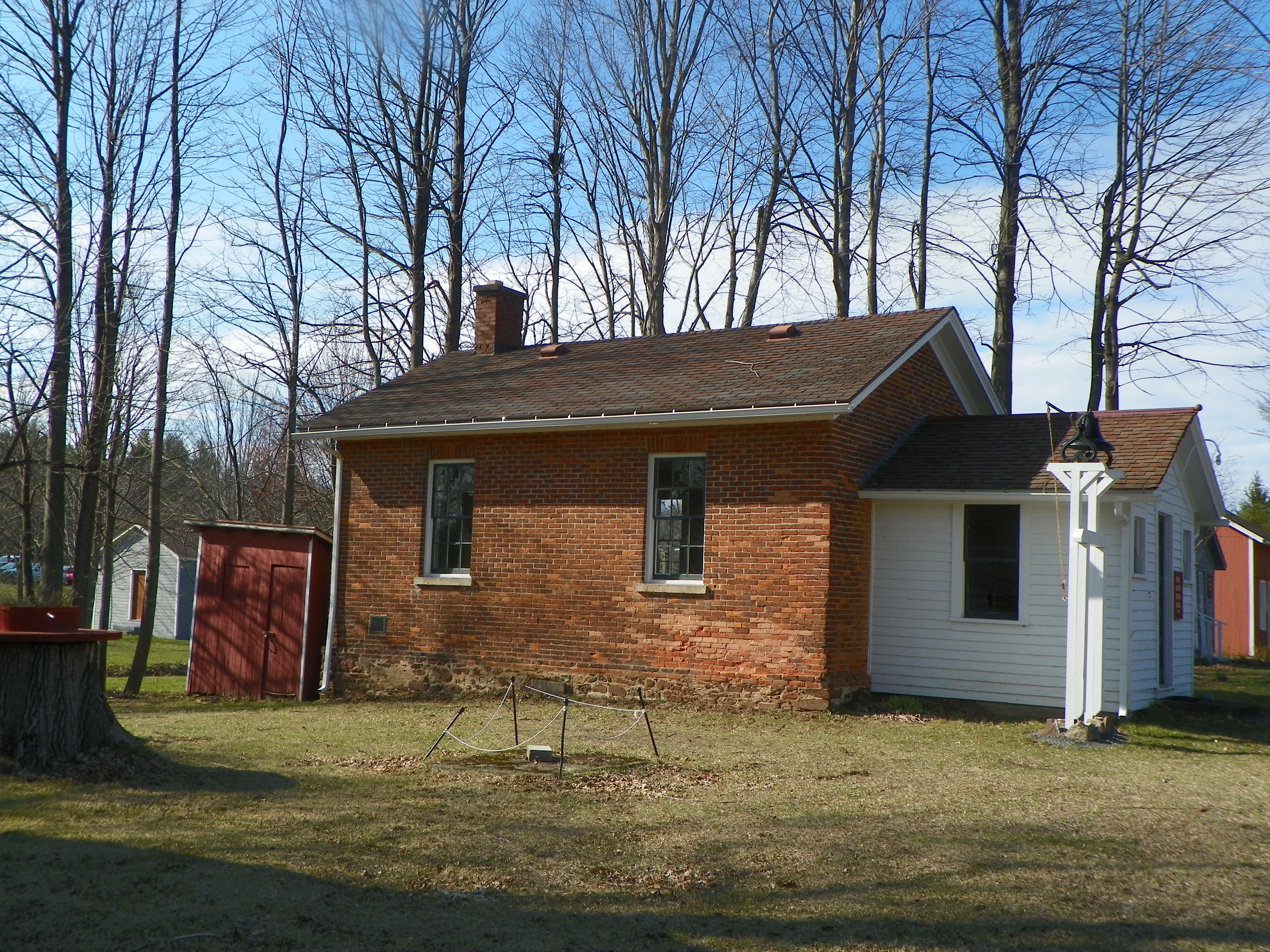
Schoolhouse District No. 4, part of the Brick Church Corners historic district
