= Macedon, New York =

- Town
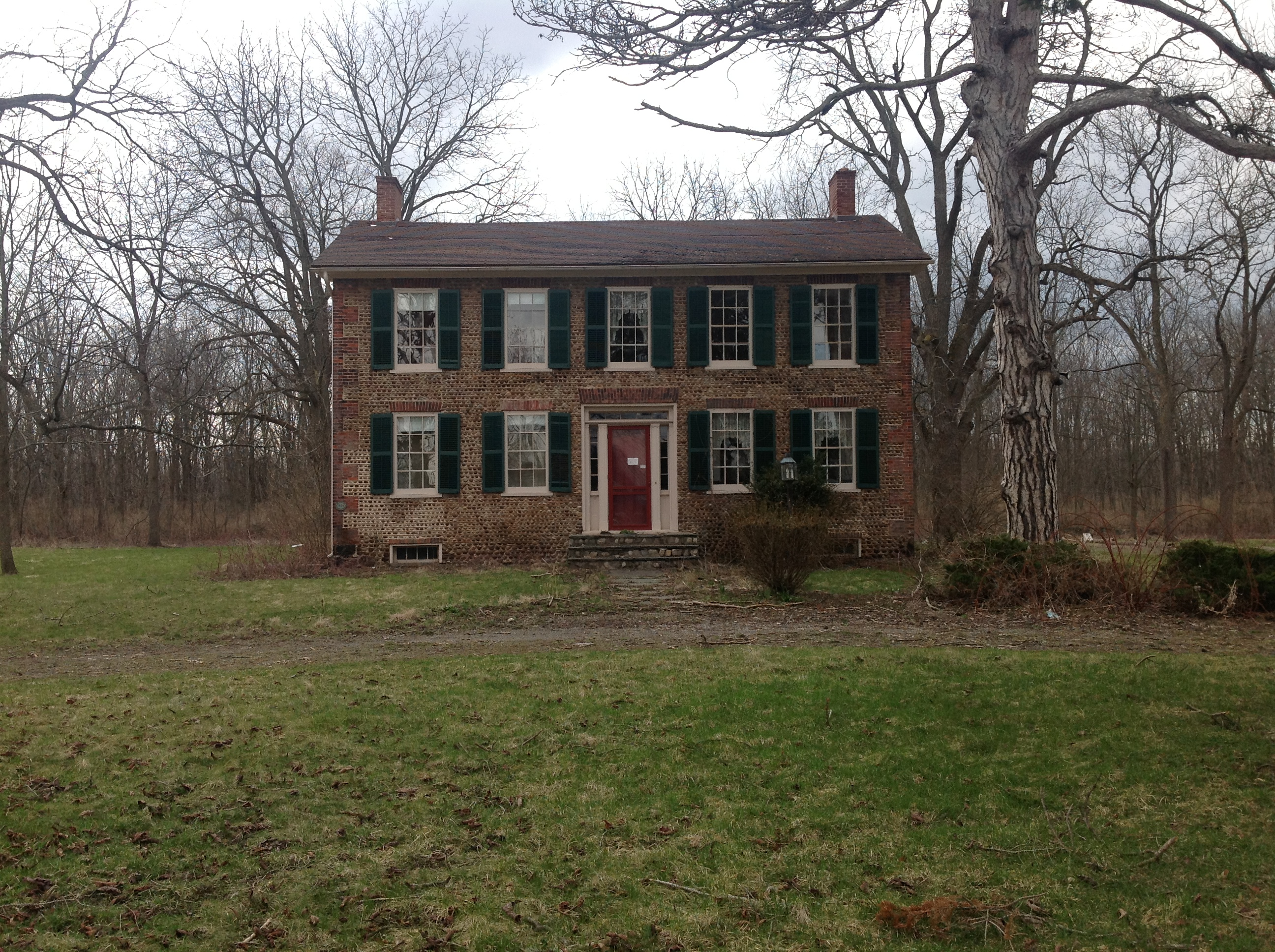
- The Charles Bullis House
- Nickname: "The Two Lock Town"
- Location in Wayne County and the state of New York.
- Coordinates: 43°04′04″N 077°18′13″W
- Country: United States
- State: New York
- County: Wayne
- Settled: 1789
- Established: January 29, 1823

Government
  - Type: Town Board
  - Supervisor: Kim Leonard
  - Clerk: Karrie Bowers
  - Court: Justice Tom L. Crowley; Justice Ron J. Reinstein

Area
  - Total: 38.86 sq mi (100.64 km^{2})
  - Land: 38.68 sq mi (100.18 km^{2})
  - Water: 0.18 sq mi (0.46 km^{2})
- Elevation: 489 ft (149 m)

Population (2010)
  - Total: 9,148
  - Estimate (2016): 9,005
  - Density: 232.8/sq mi (89.88/km^{2})
- Time zone: UTC-5 (Eastern (EST))
  - Summer (DST): UTC-4 (EDT)
- ZIP code: 14502
- Area codes: 315, 585 and 680
- FIPS code: 36-44149
- GNIS feature ID: 0956224
- Website: macedontown.gov

Macedon is a town in Wayne County, New York, United States. The population was 9,148 at the 2010 census.

The Town of Macedon is named after the birthplace of Alexander the Great, in Ancient Macedonia. It is located in the southwest corner of Wayne County and contains a hamlet also named Macedon, formerly an incorporated village. The town is east of Rochester and west of Syracuse.

== Etymology ==
Macedon took its name from the ancient Greek Kingdom of Macedon. The toponym Macedon is derived itself from the ancient Greek adjective μακεδνός (makednós), meaning "tall", possibly descriptive of the inhabitants of Macedon. It has the same root as the adjective μακρός (makros), meaning "long" or "tall" in Ancient Greek. The name is originally believed to have meant either "highlanders", "the tall ones", or "high grown men".

== History ==
Prior to early settlement, the area in and around Macedon was home to the Seneca Nation, a tribe member in the Iroquois League.

The town land was acquired for settlement in 1788 from the Commonwealth of Massachusetts as part of the Phelps and Gorham Purchase. The first settlers, Webb and Hannah Harwood, arrived in 1789.

The construction and completion of the Erie Canal from 1817 to 1825 brought many new settlers to the area. The town of Macedon was incorporated during the canal construction in 1823, from what had been the western half of the Town of Palmyra. The opening of the Erie Canal led to the forming of new port communities like Wayneport and the Village of Macedon, with the latter centered on Lock 30.

Remnants of the former Enlarged Erie Canal Lock 60 (also called the Lower Macedon Lock) are located along the canal trail off Quaker Road, just east of the Village of Macedon. It was built in 1841 as a single-chamber lock, but doubled in 1874. The lock had a lift of 10.02 feet (3.05 m) to the west. It was abandoned in 1914. The site is currently maintained as a park. Nearby are the remains of Erie Canal Change Bridge #39 (also called Gallup's Bridge), located just west of the intersection of O'Neil and Quaker roads. A change bridge allowed towpaths to switch from one side of the canal to the other. The bridge was constructed in 1881 and had an iron lattice truss with a wooden floor. Only the foundations are still in place.

The Macedon Academy, open from 1841 to 1902, set a standard for education excellence of the era. The academy provided an intermediate level of education, between the district school level and college.

Part of Company B, 160th New York Volunteer Infantry, was raised in Macedon during the American Civil War. At the time, the town had a population of only a little over 2,500.

The J. and E. Baker Cobblestone Farmstead and Charles Bullis House are listed on the National Register of Historic Places.

The town is part of the Erie Canalway National Heritage Corridor.

== Geography ==
According to the United States Census Bureau, the town has a total area of 38.9 square miles (101 km^{2}), of which 38.7 square miles (100 km^{2}) is land and 0.2 square miles (0.52 km^{2}) (0.44%) is water.

Macedon is bordered by the towns of Walworth to the north, Palmyra to the east, Farmington (Ontario County) to the south, and Perinton (Monroe County) to the west.

An East-West auxiliary branch of NY 31, New York State Route 31F and New York State Route 350 intersect east–west New York State Route 31 at Macedon hamlet.

== Demographics ==
Historical population
Census	Pop.	Note	%±
1830	1,990		—
1840	2,396		20.4%
1850	2,384		−0.5%
1860	2,523		5.8%
1870	2,636		4.5%
1880	2,871		8.9%
1890	2,564		−10.7%
1900	2,488		−3.0%
1910	2,355		−5.3%
1920	2,202		−6.5%
1930	2,330		5.8%
1940	2,277		−2.3%
1950	2,560		12.4%
1960	3,617		41.3%
1970	5,488		51.7%
1980	6,508		18.6%
1990	7,375		13.3%
2000	8,688		17.8%
2010	9,148		5.3%
2016 (est.)	9,005	▼	−1.6%
U.S. Decennial Census

As of the census of 2010, there were 9,148 people, 3,650 households, and 2,583 families residing in the town. The population density was 235.2 inhabitants per square mile (90.8/km^{2}). The racial makeup of the town was 95.9% White, 0.8% Black or African American, 0.2% Native American, 1.1% Asian, 0.4% from other races, and 1.6% from two or more races. Hispanic or Latino of any race were 1.44% of the population.

There were 3,650 households, out of which 31.9% had children under the age of 18 living with them, 55.8% were married couples living together, 10.1% had a female householder with no husband present, and 29.2% were non-families. 23.5% of all households were made up of individuals, and 8.1% had someone living alone who was 65 years of age or older. The average household size was 2.50 and the average family size was 2.95.

In the town, the population was spread out, with 26.5% under the age of 20, 4.7% from 20 to 24, 25.3% from 25 to 44, 30.6% from 45 to 64, and 12.9% who were 65 years of age or older. The median age was 41.1 years. For every 100 females, there were 99.5 males. For every 100 females age 18 and over, there were 98.0 males.

The median income for a household in the town was $76,146, and the median income for a family was $85,181. Males had a median income of $64,392 versus $41,594 for females. The per capita income for the town was $29,551. About 1.0% of families and 2.7% of the population were below the poverty line, including 2.3% of those under age 18 and 0.8% of those age 65 or over.

=== Housing ===
There were 3,381 housing units at an average density of 86.9 units per square mile (33.6 units/km^{2}); a total of 6.0% of housing units were vacant.

There were 3,650 occupied housing units in the town, of which 2,831 were owner-occupied units (77.6%), while 819 were renter-occupied (22.4%). The homeowner vacancy rate was 1.5% of total units. The rental unit vacancy rate was 10.8%.

== Education ==
Palmyra-Macedon Intermediate School is located in Macedon and is part of the Palmyra-Macedon Central School District. Portions of Macedon are also within the Gananda Central School District. The Macedon Public Library serves the town. The library also houses the Bullis Collection, also described as the Bullis Room, which includes books, personal papers, photographs, diaries, local history materials, and artefacts from the Bullis family.

== Communities and locations in the Town of Macedon ==
- Cator Corners — A location north of Macedon hamlet on NY-31F.
- Huddle — A hamlet by the north town line on County Road 208.
- Gananda — A "master planned community" and Title VII new town that is partially located in Macedon, along the north town line, between NY 350 and Hance Road
- Macedon — The hamlet of Macedon, located in the south part of the town on NY-31 and the Erie Canal. It was formerly an incorporated village.
- Macedon Center — A location northwest of Macedon hamlet, located on NY-31F.
- North Macedon — A location north of Macedon hamlet on Route 31F.
- Walworth Station — A location by the junction of County Roads 208 and 209 in the east part of the town.
- Wayneport — A hamlet in the southeast part of the town is located on the Erie Canal and County Road 306. It was formerly called "West Macedon."
- Yellow Mills — A hamlet in the southeast part of the town, west of Village of Palmyra on NY-31.

== Notable person ==
- John L. Bullis — decorated American soldier and real estate entrepreneur
