= Ontario, New York =

Town in Wayne County, New York, US

- Town
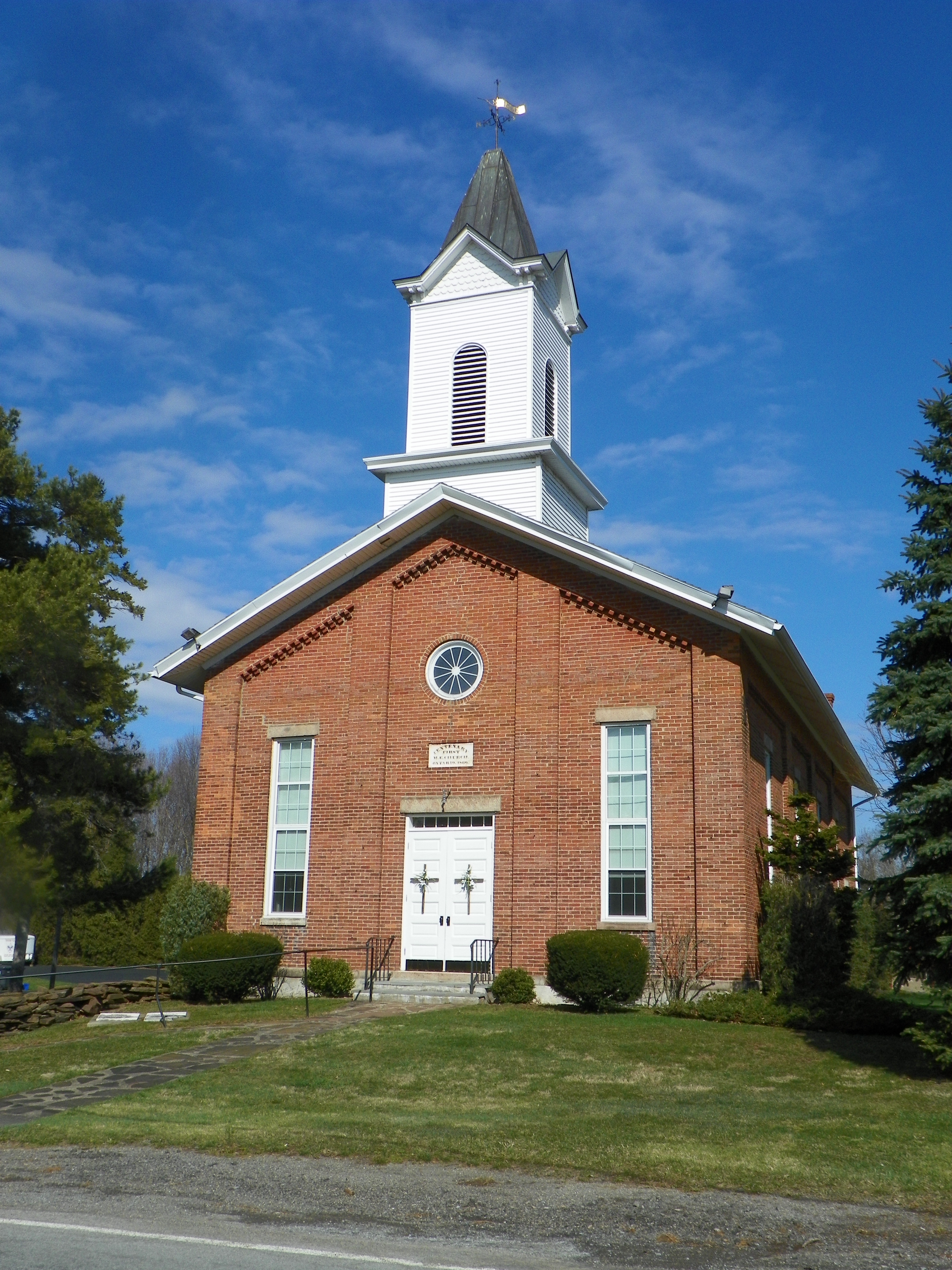
- North Ontario United Methodist Church
- Motto: A Community of Good Neighbors
- Location in Wayne County and the state of New York.

- Location within the state of New York
- Coordinates: 43°14′32″N 77°17′53″W
- Country: United States
- State: New York
- County: Wayne
- Settled: 1806
- Established: March 27, 1807

Government
  - Type: Town Board
  - Supervisor: Frank Robusto
  - Clerk: Debra DeMinck
  - Court: Justice Dom Paz; Justice William Benedict II

Area
  - Total: 32.50 sq mi (84.17 km^{2})
  - Land: 32.41 sq mi (83.95 km^{2})
  - Water: 0.085 sq mi (0.22 km^{2})
- Elevation: 377 ft (115 m)

Population (2010)
  - Total: 10,136
  - Estimate (2016): 10,064
  - Density: 310.5/sq mi (119.89/km^{2})
- Time zone: UTC-5 (Eastern (EST))
  - Summer (DST): UTC-4 (EDT)
- ZIP code: 14519
- Area codes: 315, 585 and 680
- FIPS code: 36-55013
- GNIS feature ID: 0979313
- Website: http://www.ontariotown.org/

Ontario is a town in the northwest corner of Wayne County, New York, United States. The population was 9,778 at the 2000 census, and 10,136 at the 2010 census. The town is named after the Great Lake on its northern border.

The town has a hamlet (and census-designated place), also called Ontario. Government offices for the town are located there.

== History ==
The first settler was Freeman Hopkins, who arrived in 1806 from Rhode Island. He built a small log cabin that had to hold his nine children, wife and himself. Heavy timber and swamps made life difficult for the first settlers.

The town of Ontario was created in 1807 as the "Town of Freetown" from a part of the town of Williamson. Soon after, the name was changed to "Ontario". Part of Ontario was used to form the town of Walworth in 1829.

In 1811, iron ore was discovered and a thriving smelting operation arose that lasted until past the end of the century.

In 1874, the Lake Ontario Shore Railroad (now the Rome, Watertown and Ogdensburg Railroad) was opened.

On June 1, 1970, the Robert E. Ginna Nuclear Power Plant started commercial operation on the shore of Lake Ontario within the town, just past the Monroe County line.

== Geography ==
According to the United States Census Bureau, the town has a total area of 32.3 square miles (84 km^{2}), of which 32.2 square miles (83 km^{2}) is land and 0.1 square miles (0.26 km^{2}) (0.37%) is water.

The northern town boundary is Lake Ontario, and the western town line is the border of Monroe County. The town is east of the City of Rochester.

New York State Route 104 is an east-west highway that intersects north-south highway New York State Route 350 at Ontario Center.

== Demographics ==
Historical population
Census	Pop.	Note	%±
1820	2,233		—
1830	1,587		−28.9%
1840	1,889		19.0%
1850	2,246		18.9%
1860	2,320		3.3%
1870	2,295		−1.1%
1880	2,962		29.1%
1890	2,611		−11.9%
1900	2,550		−2.3%
1910	2,672		4.8%
1920	2,620		−1.9%
1930	2,713		3.5%
1940	2,851		5.1%
1950	3,297		15.6%
1960	4,259		29.2%
1970	6,014		41.2%
1980	7,480		24.4%
1990	8,560		14.4%
2000	9,778		14.2%
2010	10,136		3.7%
2016 (est.)	10,064	▼	−0.7%
U.S. Decennial Census

As of the census of 2010, there were 10,136 people, 3,960 households, and 2,898 families residing in the town. The population density was 303.5 inhabitants per square mile (117.2/km^{2}). The racial makeup of the town was 96.7% White, 1.2% Black or African American, 0.2% Native American, 0.5% Asian, 0.0% Pacific Islander, 0.4% from other races, and 1.0% from two or more races. Hispanic or Latino of any race were 1.6% of the population.

There were 3,960 households, out of which 32.2% had children under the age of 18 living with them, 59.2% were married couples living together, 9.4% had a female householder with no husband present, and 26.8% were non-families. 20.8% of all households were made up of individuals, and 8.2% had someone living alone who was 65 years of age or older. The average household size was 2.56 and the average family size was 2.96.

In the town, the population was spread out, with 26.0% under the age of 20, 4.7% from 20 to 24, 24.0% from 25 to 44, 32.5% from 45 to 64, and 12.5% who were 65 years of age or older. The median age was 42.1 years. For every 100 females, there were 98.1 males. For every 100 females age 18 and over, there were 96.8 males.

The median income for a household in the town was $65,472, and the median income for a family was $74,589. Males had a median income of $53,917 versus $34,732 for females. The per capita income for the town was $30,559. About 2.3% of families and 5.2% of the population were below the poverty line, including 8.3% of those under age 18 and 2.7% of those age 65 or over.

=== Housing ===
There were 4,145 housing units at an average density of 128.3 per square mile (49.5/km^{2}); a total of 4.5% of housing units were vacant.

There were 3,960 occupied housing units in the town, of which 3,329 were owner-occupied units (84.1%), while 631 were renter-occupied (15.9%). The homeowner vacancy rate was 1.3% of total units. The rental unit vacancy rate was 7.3%.

== Communities and locations in the Town of Ontario ==
- Bear Creek — A lakeside hamlet on County Road 101 that was once the port for loading iron ore from the county.
- Fruitland — A location west of Ontario Center on NY-104.
- Furnaceville — A hamlet near the eastern town line on County Road 110, where one of the last major iron furnaces was located (1825 – 1887).
- Ginna Nuclear Generating Station — A nuclear power generator on the shore of Lake Ontario.
- Lakeside — A hamlet on Route 104, north of Fruitland on County Road 102. In spite of its name, it is not located on the shore of a lake.
- Ontario — The hamlet (and census-designated place) of Ontario is on NY-104 and County Road 110 in the southeastern part of the town. It was first settled around 1807. The Brick Church Corners historic district was listed on the National Register of Historic Places in 1973.
- Ontario Center — A hamlet by the NY-104 and NY-350 junction. The First Presbyterian Church of Ontario Center was listed on the National Register of Historic Places in 1998.
- Ontario-on-the-Lake — A lakeside hamlet in the northwest corner of the town on County Road 101.
- Union Hill — A hamlet by the west town line on NY-104. It also extends into Monroe County.

== Nearby towns ==
- Webster
- Williamson
- Walworth

== Notable people ==
- Chris Collins (born 1956) – soccer player
