= Macedon (hamlet), New York =

Macedon, New York
- Hamlet and CDP
- Location in Wayne County and the state of New York.

- Location within the state of New York
- Coordinates: 43°4′8″N 77°18′9″W
- Country: United States
- State: New York
- County: Wayne
- Town: Macedon
- Settled: 1789
- Incorporated: November 1856
- Dissolved: March 31, 2017
- Named after: Macedonia (ancient kingdom)

Area
  - Total: 2.20 sq mi (5.71 km^{2})
  - Land: 2.18 sq mi (5.64 km^{2})
  - Water: 0.027 sq mi (0.07 km^{2})
- Elevation: 472 ft (144 m)

Population (2020)
  - Total: 2,092
  - Density: 961.2/sq mi (371.14/km^{2})
- Time zone: UTC-5 (Eastern (EST))
  - Summer (DST): UTC-4 (EDT)
- ZIP code: 14502
- Area codes: 315 and 680
- FIPS code: 36-44149
- GNIS feature ID: 0956224

Macedon is a hamlet (and census-designated place) located in the Town of Macedon in Wayne County, New York, United States. As of the 2010 census, the hamlet had a total population of 1,523. It is in the south-central part of the town and is southeast of Rochester.

Government offices for the Town of Macedon are located in the hamlet.

== History ==
Macedon became an inland port, located near Lock 30 on the Erie Canal (completed in 1825). The village was incorporated in 1856. Lock 30 of the canal is still in use. In the mid-late 19th century, Macedon was home of Bickford & Huffman, a manufacturer of grain drills which eventually became part of the Oliver Farm Equipment Company.

Remnants of the former Enlarged Erie Canal Lock 61 (also called the Upper Macedon Lock) are located off Route 31F and Route 350, across the road from the current Lock 30 behind Berry Plastics Corporation. It was a double-chamber lock built in 1842, and had a lift of 6.69 feet (2.04 m) to the west. The area now serves as a spillway for Lock 30 which is managed by the New York State Canal Corporation.

The village is part of the Erie Canalway National Heritage Corridor. Erie Canal Lock 30 is located beyond Macedon Fire Department at Canal Park, just off Route 31F and Route 350. It was built around 1914, and has a lift of 16.4 feet (5.0 m) to the west.

The village disincorporated on March 31, 2017. All administrative functions of the former village are now handled by the Town of Macedon.

== Geography ==
According to the United States Census Bureau, the village has a total area of 1.2 square miles (3.2 km^{2}), of which 1.2 square miles (3.2 km^{2}) is land and 0.81% is water.

The former village is located on the Erie Canal and the junction of state routes 31, 31F and 350.

== Demographics ==
Historical population
Census	Pop.	Note	%±
1870	451		—
1880	538		19.3%
1890	533		−0.9%
1900	592		11.1%
1910	536		−9.5%
1920	526		−1.9%
1930	566		7.6%
1940	557		−1.6%
1950	614		10.2%
1960	645		5.0%
1970	1,168		81.1%
1980	1,400		19.9%
1990	1,400		0.0%
2000	1,496		6.9%
2010	1,523		1.8%
2020	2,092		37.4%
U.S. Decennial Census

As of the census of 2010, there were 1,523 people, 601 households, and 416 families residing in what was then a village. The population density was 1,269.2 inhabitants per square mile (490.0/km^{2}). The racial makeup of the village was 96.2% White, 1.2% Black or African American, 0.1% Native American, 0.7% Asian, 0.1% from other races, and 1.8% from two or more races. Hispanic or Latino of any race were 1.8% of the population.

There were 601 households, out of which 31.4% had children under the age of 18 living with them, 55.4% were married couples living together, 10.0% had a female householder with no husband present, and 30.8% were non-families. 25.1% of all households were made up of individuals, and 9.2% had someone living alone who was 65 years of age or older. The average household size was 2.53 and the average family size was 3.04.

In the village, the population was spread out, with 26.8% under the age of 20, 4.1% from 20 to 24, 25.7% from 25 to 44, 31.1% from 45 to 64, and 12.3% who were 65 years of age or older. The median age was 41.0 years. For every 100 females, there were 101.2 males. For every 100 females age 18 and over, there were 100.9 males.

The median income for a household in the village was $71,406, and the median income for a family was $83,125. Males had a median income of $57,125 versus $44,038 for females. The per capita income for the village was $28,108. About 2.7% of families and 6.5% of the population were below the poverty line, including 9.8% of those under age 18 and 7.3% of those age 65 or over.

=== Housing ===
There were 633 housing units at an average density of 527.5 per square mile (203.7/km^{2}); a total of 5.1% of housing units are vacant.

There are 601 occupied housing units in the town, with 451 being owner-occupied (75.0%), while 150 are renter-occupied (25.0%). The homeowner vacancy rate is 0.9% of total units. The rental unit vacancy rate is 9.6%.

== Dissolution ==
After more than a century in existence, the Village of Macedon has become commonly cited as an unnecessary layer of bureaucracy. Dissolution of the village is seen as a way to reduce taxes for residents. However, many residents see dissolution as a potential loss of services and of the village identity. It has become a polarizing issue for residents. A referendum on dissolution was thrice defeated during the period 2000–2010.

The idea had been debated since the village commissioned a study to predict results and tax savings after dissolution in 2001. The study was completed for the village in 2002 by Genesee/Finger Lakes Regional Planning Council. It estimated a savings of $65 per year in decreased tax levy for the average resident.

In 2007, residents petitioned to dissolve the village, arguing that eliminating a layer of government would reduce taxes for residents. A referendum was held in March 2008, and the measure was defeated by a vote of 257 to 228. A referendum was brought to vote again in 2010 by the group One Macedon, supporting dissolution. Both One Macedon and the anti-dissolution group, Village Pride, held rallies to gain public support on the Saturday before election day. Again, the dissolution referendum failed by a vote of 295 to 199. By law, the issue of dissolution could not be brought to a vote until 2014, but waning support for dissolution could postpone another vote for many years after that statute.

In 2015, a third petition to dissolve the village was validated. On June 10, residents voted 300 to 246 in favor of dissolution. A vote on the proposed dissolution plan, which was presented on October 28, 2015, took place on March 15, 2016. The measure passed 324 to 181. Macedon is the third village in Wayne County to dissolve after the Village of Lyons did so in 2015. Savannah was the first village to be dissolved in 1979. The Village of Macedon was dissolved on March 31, 2017. It should be re-classified as a census-designated place by the United States Census Bureau within the next couple years.

== Macedon Partners ==
In 2008, The Macedon Partners Association was founded by a partnership of local government, business owners and residents. The organization provides programs for overall revitalization to the Village of Macedon taking into consideration: building code compliance, crime, safety, and cleanliness issues. Efforts by the association can be seen in the recent rehabilitation of many buildings along Main Street.

== Notable person ==
- David P. Richardson, former US Congressman
