= Heluva Good! =

American company

- Company type: Subsidiary
- Industry: Food
- Founded: 1925 (established 1939); Sodus, New York, United States
- Founder: Perry Messinger
- Headquarters: Lynnfield, Massachusetts, United States
- Area served: United States and Canada
- Products: Cheeses, chip dips, sour cream, condiments
- Parent: HP Hood LLC
- Website: heluvagood.com

Heluva Good! is an American company specializing in cheeses, chip dips, sour cream and condiments. It has been a subsidiary of dairy company HP Hood LLC since the acquisition of Crowley Foods in 2004. The primary offices for the company are in Lynnfield, Massachusetts. Heluva Good! products are sold in grocery stores throughout much of the United States and Canada. A Heluva Good! Country Store was located in Wallington, New York, just east of the village of Sodus which first opened in 1980. All cheese products were packaged at a plant in Sodus, New York. Both locations closed on June 26, 2015.

== History ==
Heluva Good! was founded by Sodus resident Perry Messinger in 1925, when he started making washed curd cheese as a hobby in the basement of A.B. Williams Company for which he owned and managed at the time. Regarding the name origin, a traveling salesman stopped by Messinger's store one day and sampled a wedge of cheese. "Boy, that's a hell of a good cheese," the salesman said after tasting it. Messinger would open a cheese shop in 1939 which officially established the company. Its present name would be registered the following year after an issue with government regulators regarding the application.

Messinger was known for his humorous side. His executive officers for the company were listed: Father Time as President; Death and Taxes as Treasurer; Geo. Experience as Secretary. The face of Father Time adorned the packaging of Heluva Good! products for over half a century. Business was kept small and family oriented for a number of years. Despite this, his products had attracted notable customers including Franklin D. Roosevelt and Jimmy Doolittle.

In 1955, Messinger sold his company to salesman George F.T. Yancey, Sr. of Rochester, New York. Yancey and his son would turn Heluva Good! into the regional business known today, introducing additional cheeses along with chip dips and condiments.

Heluva Good! was purchased by Crowley Foods of Binghamton, New York in 1984. It would eventually be acquired by HP Hood twenty years later. In 2006, Father Time was retired in favor of more colorful and lively packaging but has since made a return.

The company has sponsored NASCAR racing events in recent years, including the Heluva Good! Sour Cream Dips 400 of the Sprint Cup Series at Michigan International Speedway in 2010–2011.

On April 19, 2015, HP Hood confirmed that both the cheese packaging plant in Sodus and the Heluva Good! Country Store in Wallington would be closing on June 26, 2015. Warehouse and delivery operations would continue through the end of July. Heluva Good! cheese products are currently manufactured by Schreiber Foods, Inc. of Green Bay, Wisconsin. Packaging operations would be moved there. Heluva Good! chip dips and condiments will still be manufactured and packaged at a facility in Arkport, New York which is owned and operated by HP Hood. Some New York State consumers have already complained about the change as a result of Heluva Good! cheese products no longer being produced locally, citing corporate greed. According to the Wayne County Economic Development Department, HP Hood stated that market conditions were the primary reason for the closure.
