= Crowley Foods =

American dairy company

- Company type: Subsidiary
- Industry: Food
- Founded: 1904 (established 1915); Poughkeepsie, New York, United States
- Founder: J.K. Crowley
- Headquarters: Lynnfield, Massachusetts, United States
- Area served: Eastern United States
- Products: Dairy
- Parent: HP Hood LLC (primary); Balford Farms (part-owner)
- Website: http://crowleyfoods.com

Crowley Foods (legal name Crowley Foods LLC) is an American dairy company formerly based in Binghamton, New York. It has been a subsidiary of HP Hood LLC since being purchased by the company in 2004, which is headquartered in Lynnfield, Massachusetts. Products provided by the company include milk, half and half, cream, cottage cheese, sour cream and yogurt. The original plant located on Conklin Avenue in Binghamton manufactured these dairy products until the acquisition by HP Hood, when certain Crowley Foods items began to be made at facilities elsewhere which were better equipped. Production at the plant ceased altogether in 2012, but the warehouse and distribution center continued to be used until 2014.

A news source from Binghamton mentions that Balford Farms of Burlington, New Jersey, purchased the rights to Crowley Foods in 2014. Another source states that Balford Farms is a part-owner, having only a portion of the assets. According to the history section on the Crowley Foods website, as of 2017, it mentions that their products are still part of the HP Hood line of brands. Balford Farms took over the warehouse and distribution center for Crowley Foods, located in nearby Conklin, New York, in 2014. Mountain Fresh Dairy of Queens, New York, purchased the Binghamton plant in 2013, and began production at the facility in late 2016. They ceased operations two years later and the building was once again vacant. It was sold to a local development company in 2022.

== History ==
Crowley Foods was founded in 1904 by grocery clerk James K. "J.K." Crowley when he purchased a fledgling dairy business for $500.00 in Poughkeepsie, New York. His company assets began with a horse and wagon, ice house, barn, some cans and bottles as well as a milk delivery route serving local customers. In 1915, Crowley moved and expanded his business at Binghamton as the location was closer to numerous dairy farms in upstate New York. Originally known as Crowley's Dairy Company, manufacturing and distribution of dairy products began at the facility on Conklin Avenue and would continue there for almost 100 years. A second plant opened at Newburgh, New York, in 1921. Retail outlets and other production facilities soon followed. At its peak, Crowley's Dairy Company sold their products throughout much of the northeastern United States.

Crowley's Dairy Company would sponsor a set of 18 baseball cards featuring players from the Binghamton Triplets, who won the Eastern League championship in 1940. The team was a minor league affiliate of the New York Yankees during that time.

For many years Crowley milk cartons proclaimed their motto, "Crowley's Milk As Good as Any Better'n Some".

Crowley Foods was sold to Dutch company NV Wessanen Koninklijke Fabrieken (now Royal Wessanen) in 1983 for $16.4 million. Royal Wessanen then did a roll up of several additional regional dairy brands. National Dairy Holdings would purchase Crowley Foods and other brands in the portfolio from Royal Wessanen in 2001 for $400 million, only to be acquired by HP Hood three years later in a deal that also included Kemps of St. Paul, Minnesota.

The company has competed in and won many dairy competitions over the years. In recent times, Crowley Foods broke their own record by winning five gold medals and seven silver medals in a competition of prestigious dairy foods at the 2005 Great New York State Fair in Syracuse, New York. Crowley Foods won a total of ten medals at the same event a year earlier.

== Acquisitions ==
Crowley Foods has acquired a number of dairy companies to expand business, including:

- Axelrod Foods of New York City in 1961.
- Heluva Good! of Sodus, New York, in 1984.
- M. Maggio Company of Philadelphia in 1996.
- Penn Maid Foods of Philadelphia in 1996.
- Ready Food Products of Philadelphia in 1996.
- Rosenberger's Dairy of Hatfield, Pennsylvania, in 2002.

All companies were acquired by HP Hood in 2004. The Ready Food Products brands were discontinued. Rosenberger's Dairy was sold to Balford Farms in 2014.

Crowley Foods acquired a production plant from defunct Jersey Milk & Cream Company in 1954, located in LaFargeville, New York. The facility is now operated by HP Hood.
