= Alton, New York =

Hamlet in the state of New York, United States

Coordinates: 43°12′40″N 76°58′50″W

Alton is a hamlet within the Town of Sodus, Wayne County, New York, United States. It is located six miles (10 km) southeast of the Village of Sodus and five miles (8 km) south of the Village of Sodus Point, at an elevation of 377 feet (115 m). The primary intersection in the hamlet is at N.Y. Route 14 and Ridge Road (CR 143). N.Y. Route 104 passes just south of Alton.

A United States Post Office is located in Alton with a ZIP Code of 14413.

== Shaker Heights ==
Shaker Heights is a small community located northeast of Alton just inside the Town of Huron near the intersection of Shaker Road, Red Mill Road and Shaker Tract Road along the southwestern shore of Sodus Bay. It was originally settled as farmland by the Shakers in 1826, a branch of the United Society of Believers in Christ's Second Appearing. The Sodus Bay unit began with 72 members which eventually grew to over 150 members. Over the years, the village would consist of a few farm houses, barns, a grist mill, a meeting house and a dwelling house.

In 1836, New York State proposed creating a canal off of Sodus Bay which would improve area transportation to locations throughout the western part of the region. Its route could possibly threaten the Shaker village by right of eminent domain. The land was sold later that year and all members eventually relocated their community to the town of Groveland in nearby Livingston County. The establishment remained there until 1892 when the Shaker community was dissolved.

Alasa Farms, formerly known as the Sodus Bay Shaker Tract and Sodus Bay Phalanx, was a dwelling house and farm built by the Shakers in 1833. It is located on Shaker Road, 2 miles (3 km) north-northeast of Alton. The property was listed on the National Register of Historic Places in 2009.
