= Sodus Center, New York =

Hamlet in New York, United States

Coordinates: 43°12′17″N 77°01′28″W

Sodus Center is a hamlet in the Town of Sodus, Wayne County, New York, United States. It is located four miles (6 km) southeast of the Village of Sodus, at an elevation of 417 feet (127 m). The primary cross roads where the hamlet is located are Sodus Center Road (CR 241), Barclay Road and Main Street.

A United States Post Office was located in Sodus Center with a ZIP Code of 14554. It permanently closed on November 25, 1995.

The Red Brick Church was listed on the National Register of Historic Places in 1997.
