= East Williamson, New York =

Hamlet in New York, United States

Coordinates: 43°13′50″N 77°08′43″W

East Williamson is a hamlet located within the Town of Williamson, Wayne County, New York, United States near the Sodus town line. It is located two miles (3 km) east of the hamlet of Williamson, at an elevation of 453 feet (138 m). The primary cross roads where the hamlet is located are Ridge Road (CR 103), East Townline Road (CR 118) and Marion-East Williamson Road (CR 218). N.Y. Route 104 passes just north of East Williamson.

A United States Post Office is located in East Williamson with a ZIP Code of 14449.
