= KSDC =

KSDC may refer to:

- Kuki State Demand Committee
- KSDC, the ICAO airport code for Williamson-Sodus Airport in New York State
- KSDC-LP, a low-powered radio station in Centralia, Missouri
- Kentucky State Data Center
