= Wallington, New York =

Community in New York

Coordinates: 43°13′18″N 77°00′45″W

Wallington is a hamlet in the Town of Sodus, Wayne County, New York, United States. It is located three miles (5 km) southeast of the Village of Sodus and six miles (10 km) south-southwest of the Village of Sodus Point, at an elevation of 404 feet (123 m). The primary cross roads where the hamlet is located are Ridge Road (CR 143), North Geneva Road (CR 140) and South Geneva Road (CR 240). N.Y. Route 104 passes just south of Wallington.

== Attractions ==
Wallington Volunteer Fire Department hosts the 'Bog & Grog', a mud racing event, twice a year on their firemen's field.

The Walling Cobblestone Tavern and Wallington Cobblestone Schoolhouse District No. 8 were listed on the National Register of Historic Places in 1994.
