= Huron, New York =

- Town
- Location in Wayne County and the state of New York.

- Location within the state of New York
- Coordinates: 43°14′24″N 76°53′39″W
- Country: United States
- State: New York
- County: Wayne
- Settled: 1796
- Established: February 25, 1826

Government
  - Type: Town Board
  - Supervisor: Phil Eygnor
  - Clerk: Tammy A. Vezzose
  - Court: Justice David Urban; Justice Kathy Wachtman

Area
  - Total: 43.10 sq mi (111.63 km^{2})
  - Land: 39.39 sq mi (102.02 km^{2})
  - Water: 3.71 sq mi (9.61 km^{2})
- Elevation: 292 ft (89 m)

Population (2010)
  - Total: 2,118
  - Estimate (2016): 2,036
  - Density: 51.7/sq mi (19.96/km^{2})
- Time zone: UTC-5 (Eastern (EST))
  - Summer (DST): UTC-4 (EDT)
- Area codes: 315 and 680
- FIPS code: 36-37165
- GNIS feature ID: 0979089
- Website: https://www.huronny.gov/

Huron is a town in Wayne County, New York, United States. The population was 2,118 at the 2010 census. The town is named after the Huron Indians.

The Town of Huron is in the northeastern part of the county and is east of Rochester, New York. It has a hamlet, also called Huron. Government offices for the town are located just east of there at Rice Mill.

There is no post office in the Town of Huron. Primary postal districts covering the area include ZIP Code 14590 for Wolcott and ZIP Code 14516 for North Rose.

== History ==
The town was part of the Pulteney Purchase. It was first settled circa 1796.

The Town of Huron was created from the Town of Wolcott in 1826 as the "Town of Port Bay." In 1834, the town's name was changed to honor the Huron tribe.

From 1826 to 1837, a Shaker community known today as Shaker Heights was partially located in the town. Because the Shakers believed that too many worldly influences were appearing in Huron, they moved to the Town of Groveland and established the Groveland Shaker Village, which is now where the Groveland Correctional Facility is located.

== Geography ==
According to the United States Census Bureau, the town has a total area of 43.2 square miles (112 km^{2}), of which 39.5 square miles (102 km^{2}) is land and 3.7 square miles (9.6 km^{2}) (8.54%) is water.

The northern town line is Lake Ontario. Sodus Bay, a large inlet of Lake Ontario, is an important feature of the town.

New York State Route 104 passes across the south part of the town.

== Demographics ==
Historical population
Census	Pop.	Note	%±
1830	1,082		—
1840	1,943		79.6%
1850	1,966		1.2%
1860	1,966		0.0%
1870	2,060		4.8%
1880	2,036		−1.2%
1890	1,793		−11.9%
1900	1,667		−7.0%
1910	1,531		−8.2%
1920	1,416		−7.5%
1930	1,313		−7.3%
1940	1,412		7.5%
1950	1,409		−0.2%
1960	1,356		−3.8%
1970	1,739		28.2%
1980	1,820		4.7%
1990	2,025		11.3%
2000	2,117		4.5%
2010	2,118		0.0%
2016 (est.)	2,036		−3.9%
U.S. Decennial Census

As of the census of 2010, there were 2,118 people, 855 households, and 590 families residing in the town. The population density was 49.0 inhabitants per square mile (18.9/km^{2}). The racial makeup of the town was 93.5% White, 2.1% Black or African American, 0.2% Native American, 0.3% Asian, 0.0% Pacific Islander, 3.1% from other races, and 0.7% from two or more races. Hispanic or Latino of any race were 4.5% of the population.

There were 855 households, out of which 24.0% had children under the age of 18 living with them, 55.6% were married couples living together, 8.2% had a female householder with no husband present, and 31.0% were non-families. 23.0% of all households were made up of individuals, and 10.2% had someone living alone who was 65 years of age or older. The average household size was 2.42 and the average family size was 2.82.

In the town, the population was spread out, with 22.4% under the age of 20, 5.4% from 20 to 24, 19.8% from 25 to 44, 33.7% from 45 to 64, and 18.6% who were 65 years of age or older. The median age was 46.4 years. For every 100 females, there were 107.6 males. For every 100 females age 18 and over, there were 107.9 males.

The median income for a household in the town was $67,765, and the median income for a family was $71,944. Males had a median income of $42,969 versus $36,193 for females. The per capita income for the town was $27,861. About 6.6% of families and 11.6% of the population were below the poverty line, including 13.6% of those under age 18 and 3.6% of those age 65 or over.

=== Housing ===
There were 1,617 housing units at an average density of 37.4 per square mile (14.4/km^{2}); a total of 47.1% of housing units were vacant.

There were 855 occupied housing units in the town, of which 702 were owner-occupied units (82.1%), while 153 were renter-occupied (17.9%). The homeowner vacancy rate was 2.5% of total units. The rental unit vacancy rate was 8.4%.

NOTE: It is common for resort communities to have higher than normal vacant house counts. Many are vacation homes which are seasonal and not regularly occupied.

== Communities and locations in the Town of Huron ==
- Bonnie Castle — A hamlet on east shore of Sodus Bay.
- Charles Point — A series of bars and islands extending from the mainland along Sodus Bay and Lake Ontario towards Sodus Point.
- Chimney Bluffs State Park — A state park bordering northeast Sodus Bay. It contains the highest point in Huron: Chimney Bluff, 175 feet above Lake Ontario.
- Eagle Island (also called "Big Island") — An island in Sodus Bay southwest of LeRoy Island.
- East Bay — A small bay of Lake Ontario east of Sodus Bay.
- East Bay Park — A hamlet near the shore of Lake Ontario on the western shore of East Bay.
- Furnace Village — A hamlet at the east town line.
- Huron — The hamlet of Huron, once called "South Huron," at County Roads 155 and 156.
- Lake Bluff — A hamlet by the northeast part of Sodus Bay on County Road 154.
- LeRoy Island (also called "Long Island") — An island in eastern part of Sodus Bay near the mainland.
- Lummisville — A hamlet northwest of Huron village on County Road 155.
- Mudge Creek — An important stream flowing northward to Lake Ontario, ending in East Bay.
- Newark Island (also called "Little Island") — An island in Sodus Bay by the west town line.
- North Huron — A hamlet north of Huron village at County Road 156, adjacent to a wide part of Mudge Creek.
- Port Bay — A small bay partly in the northeast corner of the town.
- Resort — A hamlet on Sodus Bay and County Road 143, formerly called "Port Glasgow."
- Rice Mill (formerly "Rices Settlement") — A hamlet southeast of Huron village on County Road 155 by Mudge Creek.
- Shaker Heights — A community on the southwest shore of Sodus Bay.
- Sunset View — A hamlet on the east shore of Sodus Bay.
- York — A hamlet in the southwest corner of the town.
- York Settlement — A location by the south town line, east of York.
