= Sodus, New York =

- Town
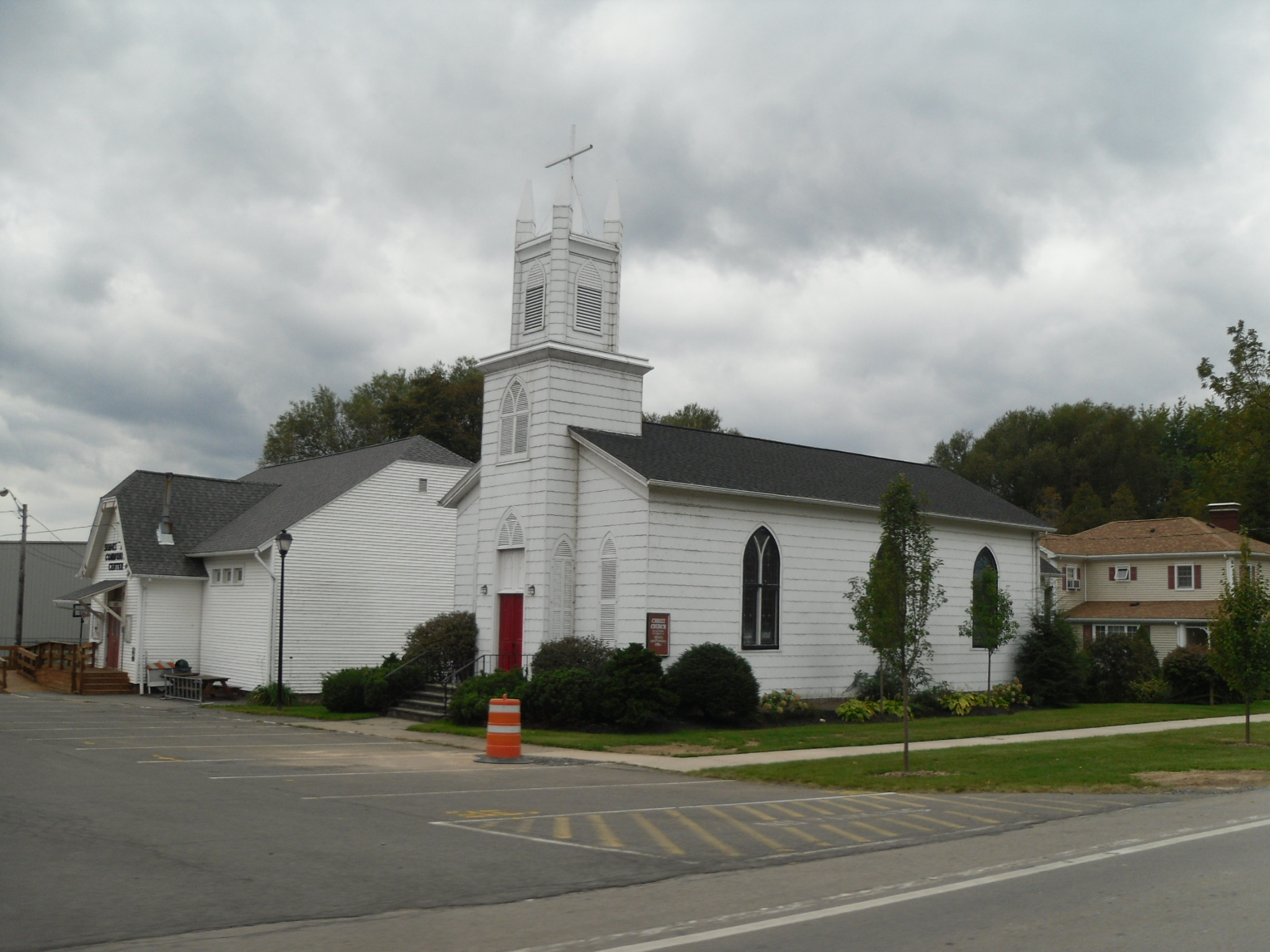
- A church in Sodus Point

- Location in Wayne County and the state of New York.

- Location within the state of New York
- Coordinates: 43°14′10″N 77°04′05″W
- Country: United States
- State: New York
- County: Wayne
- Established: January 1789; 237 years ago

Government
  - Type: Town Board
  - Supervisor: Scott Johnson
  - Clerk: Lorraine Diver
  - Court: Justice Robert A. Fratengelo; Justice Thomas A. Putnam

Area
  - Total: 69.25 sq mi (179.35 km^{2})
  - Land: 67.27 sq mi (174.22 km^{2})
  - Water: 1.98 sq mi (5.13 km^{2})
- Elevation: 449 ft (137 m)

Population (2010)
  - Total: 8,384
  - Estimate (2016): 8,105
  - Density: 120.5/sq mi (46.52/km^{2})
- Time zone: UTC-5 (Eastern (EST))
  - Summer (DST): UTC-4 (EDT)
- ZIP code: 14551
- Area codes: 315 and 680
- FIPS code: 36-68209
- GNIS feature ID: 0965619
- Website: https://sodusny.gov/

Sodus is a town in Wayne County, New York, United States. The population was 8,384 at the 2010 census. The town takes its name from a native word for the bay in the eastern part of the town: "Assorodus," meaning "silvery water."

The Town of Sodus is on the north border of the county and is midway between Rochester and Syracuse.

== History ==
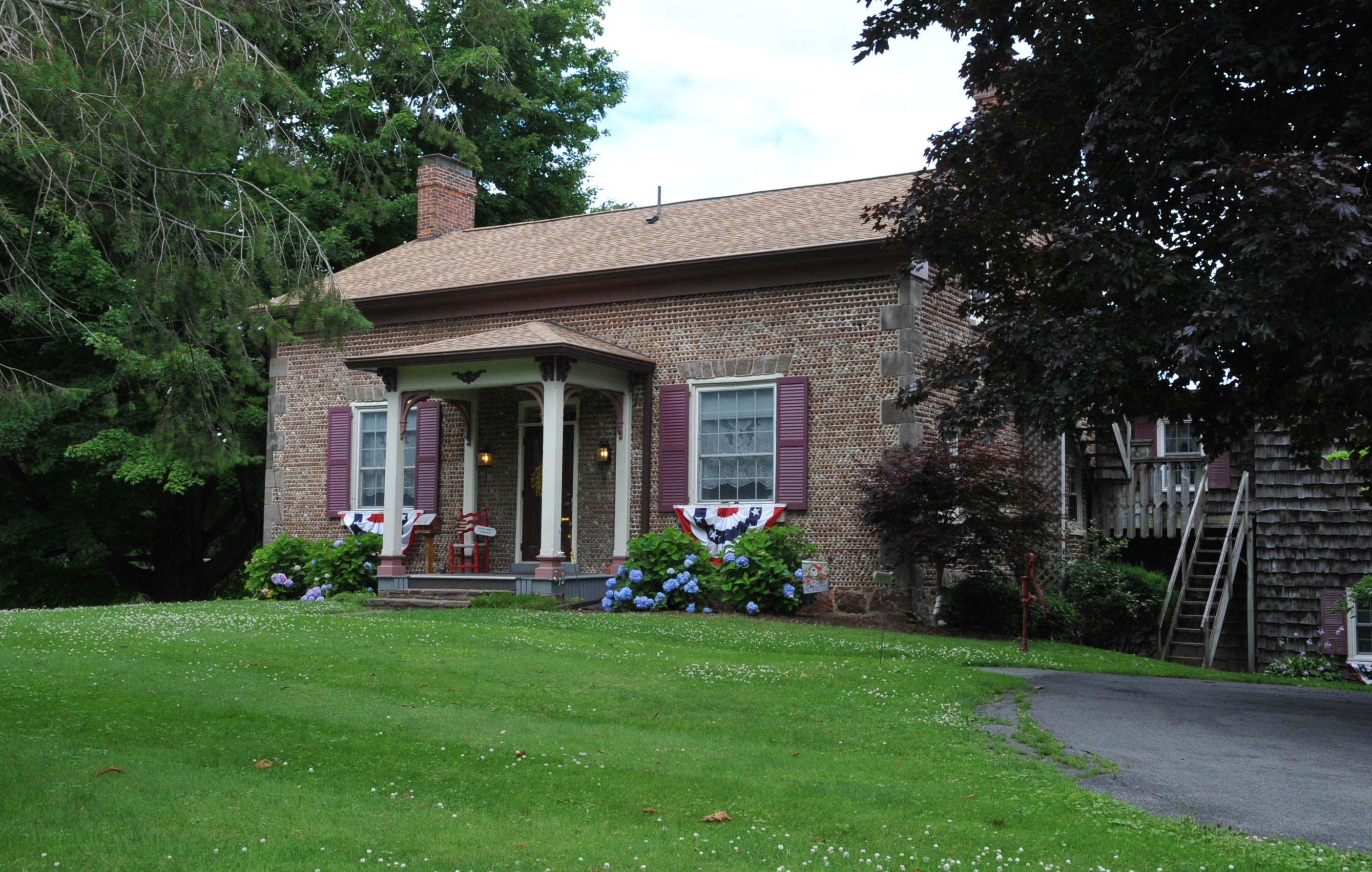
Preston-Gaylord Cobblestone Farmhouse

The Town of Sodus was formed in 1789 from the older "District of Sodus" while still part of Ontario County. The town's Adam territory was substantially reduced by the formation of newer towns in the county: Williamson (1802) and Lyons (1811).

The town contains a village also named Sodus and another named Sodus Point. Sodus Point was settled around 1794 because of a road constructed from Palmyra, but the first settlers did not arrive at the Village of Sodus until about 1809.

In 1813, the British attacked and burned the village of Sodus Point.

A lighthouse was erected in 1825 to mark the shoreline.

Members of the Shakers settled in the early town, but moved away, when they believed Sodus was becoming too worldly. Sodus claims to be the birthplace of Arbor Day, a holiday established by the efforts of Sodus Center native Edward C. Delano.

A Heluva Good! Country Store was located near the hamlet of Wallington. The cheese packaging plant in Sodus and the Heluva Good! Country Store both closed on June 26, 2015. The company is a subsidiary of HP Hood LLC, headquartered in Lynnfield, Massachusetts.

The Preston-Gaylord Cobblestone Farmhouse was listed on the National Register of Historic Places in 2009.

== Geography ==
According to the United States Census Bureau, the town has a total area of 69.4 square miles (179.6 km^{2}), of which 67.4 square miles (174.6 km^{2}) is land and 1.9 square miles (5.0 km^{2}) (2.78%) is water.

The northern border of Sodus is Lake Ontario. Sodus Bay, a bay of Lake Ontario is partly in the town.

Sodus is a town on the northern boundary of the United States, and Canada is on the opposite shore of Lake Ontario.

New York State Route 14 intersects New York State Route 104 south of Alton, and New York State Route 88 runs south from Sodus village.

Sodus is also known for its rural landscape and its many apple orchards.

=== Climate ===
Climate data for Sodus, New York (1991-2020 normals)
Month	Jan	Feb	Mar	Apr	May	Jun	Jul	Aug	Sep	Oct	Nov	Dec	Year
Mean daily maximum °C (°F)	30.9 (−0.6)	32.8 (0.4)	41.4 (5.2)	54.4 (12.4)	66.7 (19.3)	75.2 (24.0)	79.2 (26.2)	77.8 (25.4)	71.7 (22.1)	58.7 (14.8)	46.9 (8.3)	36.2 (2.3)	56.0 (13.3)
Daily mean °C (°F)	23.4 (−4.8)	24.7 (−4.1)	32.5 (0.3)	44.2 (6.8)	55.6 (13.1)	64.5 (18.1)	69.0 (20.6)	67.8 (19.9)	61.2 (16.2)	49.7 (9.8)	39.0 (3.9)	29.4 (−1.4)	46.7 (8.2)
Mean daily minimum °C (°F)	15.9 (−8.9)	16.7 (−8.5)	23.7 (−4.6)	34.0 (1.1)	44.6 (7.0)	53.9 (12.2)	58.8 (14.9)	57.7 (14.3)	50.7 (10.4)	40.7 (4.8)	31.1 (−0.5)	22.7 (−5.2)	37.5 (3.1)
Average rainfall mm (inches)	2.99 (76)	2.49 (63)	2.67 (68)	3.19 (81)	3.37 (86)	3.45 (88)	3.62 (92)	3.80 (97)	3.37 (86)	4.32 (110)	3.39 (86)	3.22 (82)	39.88 (1,013)

== Demographics ==
Historical population
Census	Pop.	Note	%±
1820	2,013		—
1830	3,528		75.3%
1840	4,472		26.8%
1850	4,598		2.8%
1860	4,745		3.2%
1870	4,631		−2.4%
1880	5,285		14.1%
1890	5,157		−2.4%
1900	5,118		−0.8%
1910	4,857		−5.1%
1920	4,408		−9.2%
1930	5,003		13.5%
1940	5,162		3.2%
1950	5,706		10.5%
1960	6,587		15.4%
1970	8,754		32.9%
1980	9,485		8.4%
1990	8,877		−6.4%
2000	8,949		0.8%
2010	8,384		−6.3%
2016 (est.)	8,105		−3.3%
U.S. Decennial Census

As of the census of 2010, there were 8,384 people, 3,325 households, and 2,189 families residing in the town. The population density was 120.8 inhabitants per square mile (46.6/km^{2}). The racial makeup of the town was 84.8% White, 8.5% Black or African American, 0.3% Native American, 0.4% Asian, 0.1% Pacific Islander, 3.1% from other races, and 2.9% from two or more races. Hispanic or Latino of any race were 6.2% of the population.

There were 3,325 households, out of which 24.9% had children under the age of 18 living with them, 49.0% were married couples living together, 11.6% had a female householder with no husband present, and 34.2% were non-families. 27.2% of all households were made up of individuals, and 10.6% had someone living alone who was 65 years of age or older. The average household size was 2.48 and the average family size was 2.97.

In the town, the population was spread out, with 24.6% under the age of 20, 5.1% from 20 to 24, 21.7% from 25 to 44, 32.1% from 45 to 64, and 16.5% who were 65 years of age or older. The median age was 43.8 years. For every 100 females, there were 98.3 males. For every 100 females age 18 and over, there were 97.7 males.

The median income for a household in the town was $46,896, and the median income for a family was $56,128. Males had a median income of $42,735 versus $37,267 for females. The per capita income for the town was $23,898. About 11.4% of families and 14.9% of the population were below the poverty line, including 23.6% of those under age 18 and 7.7% of those age 65 or over.

=== Housing ===
There were 4,158 housing units at an average density of 59.9 per square mile (23.1/km^{2}); a total of 20.0% of housing units were vacant.

There were 3,325 occupied housing units in the town, of which 2,585 were owner-occupied units (77.7%), while 740 were renter-occupied (22.3%). The homeowner vacancy rate was 2.5% of total units. The rental unit vacancy rate was 14.8%.

NOTE: It is common for resort communities to have higher than normal vacant house counts. Many are vacation homes which are seasonal and not regularly occupied.

== Notable people ==
- John Ashbery (1927–2017), poet
- Gordon Granger (1821–1876), Union Army General
- Byram Green (1786–1865), US Congressman
- Ellen Sergeant Rude (1838–1916), writer, poet, and temperance advocate
- Eliphalet Stone (1825–1905), Wisconsin state legislator
- Alexander B. Williams (b. 1815), Sodus Town Supervisor and state legislator

== Communities and locations in the Town of Sodus ==
- Alton — A hamlet near the east town line on NY-14. Alasa Farms was listed on the National Register of Historic Places in 2009.
- Beechwood State Park — A former Girl Scout camp along the Lake Ontario shore, now owned by New York State and operated by the Town of Sodus.
- Bootleggers Point — A location on the Lake Ontario shore in the west part of the town.
- Joy — A hamlet south of Sodus village at the junction of County Road 229 and Main Street.
- Sodus — The Village of Sodus is near the town center at the north end of NY-88.
- Sodus Center — A hamlet southeast of Sodus village at the junction of County Roads 240 and 241. The Red Brick Church was listed on the National Register of Historic Places in 1997.
- Sodus Point — The Village of Sodus Point is on County Road 101 (Lake Road) on the shore of Lake Ontario.
- South Sodus — A hamlet in the southeast corner of the town on NY-14.
- Thorntons Corner — A hamlet in the south part of the town at the junction of County Roads 242 and 243.
- Thornton Point — A peninsula in Sodus Bay.
- Wallington — A hamlet southeast of Sodus village on NY-104. The Walling Cobblestone Tavern and Wallington Cobblestone Schoolhouse District No. 8 were listed on the National Register of Historic Places in 1994.
- Williamson-Sodus Airport (ICAO: KSDC, FAA LID: SDC) — A general aviation airport in the western part of the town, south of NY-104.
