= Walling Cobblestone Tavern =

- U.S. National Register of Historic Places
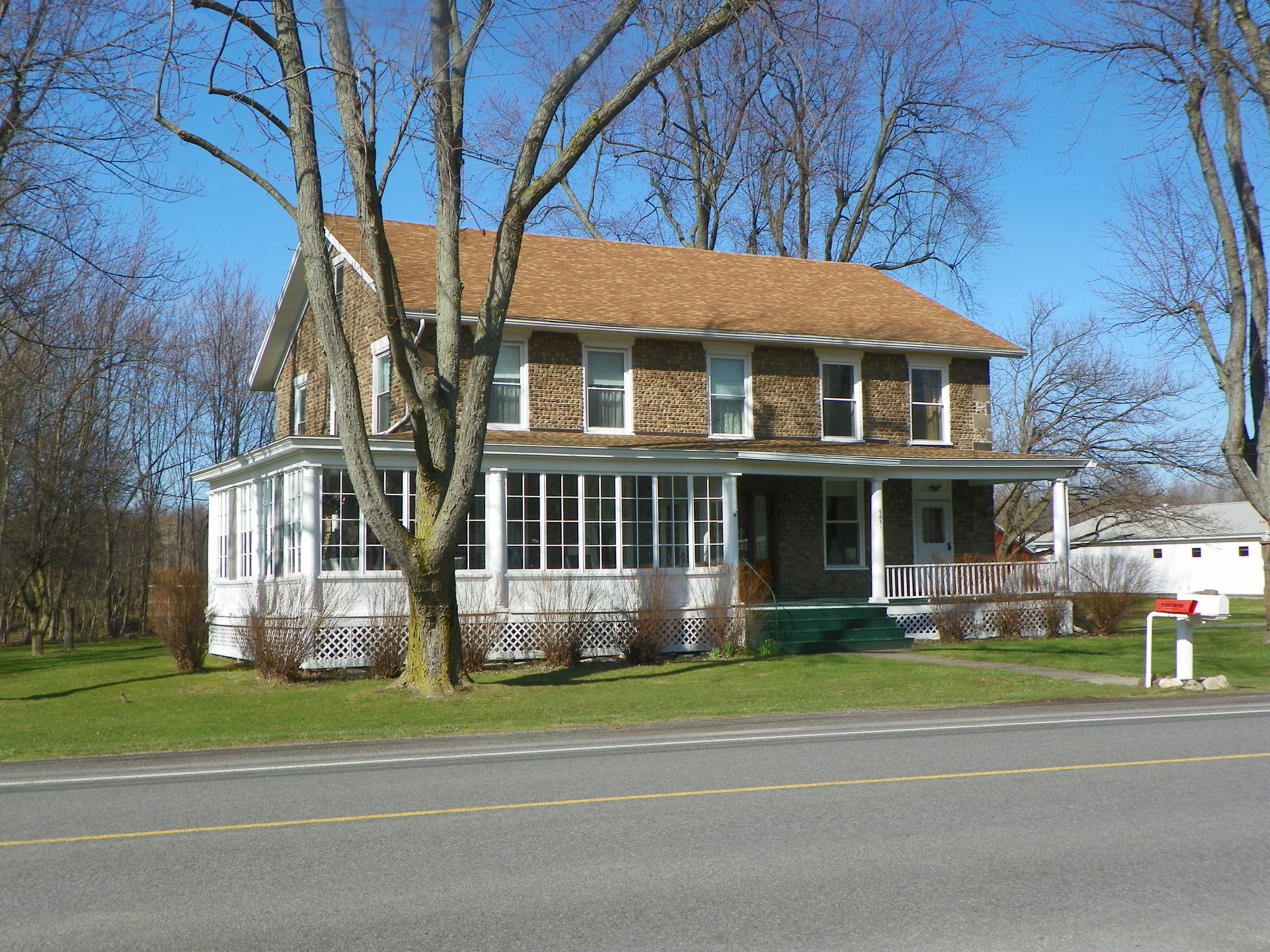
- Walling Cobblestone Tavern, April 2013

- Location within New York Location within the United States
- Location: 7851 Ridge Rd., Hamlet of Wallington, Sodus, New York
- Coordinates: 43°13′18″N 77°0′44″W
- Area: less than one acre
- Built: 1834
- Architectural style: Federal
- MPS: Cobblestone Architecture of New York State MPS
- NRHP reference No.: 94000173
- Added to NRHP: March 17, 1994

Walling Cobblestone Tavern is a historic cobblestone building located at 7851 Ridge Road in the hamlet of Wallington, Town of Sodus, Wayne County, New York, United States. Built about 1834 in the Federal architectural style, the structure is one of approximately 170 surviving cobblestone buildings in Wayne County. It was listed on the National Register of Historic Places on March 17, 1994.

== History ==
The tavern was constructed about 1834 by William Walling along Ridge Road, an early east–west transportation corridor that followed the ancient shoreline of glacial Lake Iroquois and later became an important stage and wagon route in northern New York.

During the mid-nineteenth century, taverns along Ridge Road served travelers, teamsters, and local residents, providing lodging, meals, and space for social and civic gatherings. Following the decline of stagecoach travel later in the nineteenth century and the advent of rail and automobile transportation, the building transitioned to residential use. It is currently a private dwelling.

== Architecture ==
The building is a two-story, five-bay, gable-roofed structure constructed of irregularly shaped, multi-colored field cobbles set in mortar. Its symmetrical façade and restrained detailing reflect the Federal style common in early nineteenth-century American architecture.

Cobblestone construction was most prevalent in western and central New York between the 1820s and 1860s. The stones used in these buildings were typically collected from glacial deposits in agricultural fields and laid in horizontal courses. The Walling Cobblestone Tavern is included in the Cobblestone Architecture of New York State Multiple Property Submission (MPS), a thematic grouping recognizing the architectural significance of such structures.

== Significance ==
The property was listed on the National Register of Historic Places in 1994 for its architectural significance as a representative example of Federal-style cobblestone construction and for its association with nineteenth-century roadside commerce along Ridge Road.

== See also ==
- National Register of Historic Places listings in Wayne County, New York
- Cobblestone Architecture of New York State MPS
