= Williamson, New York =

- Town
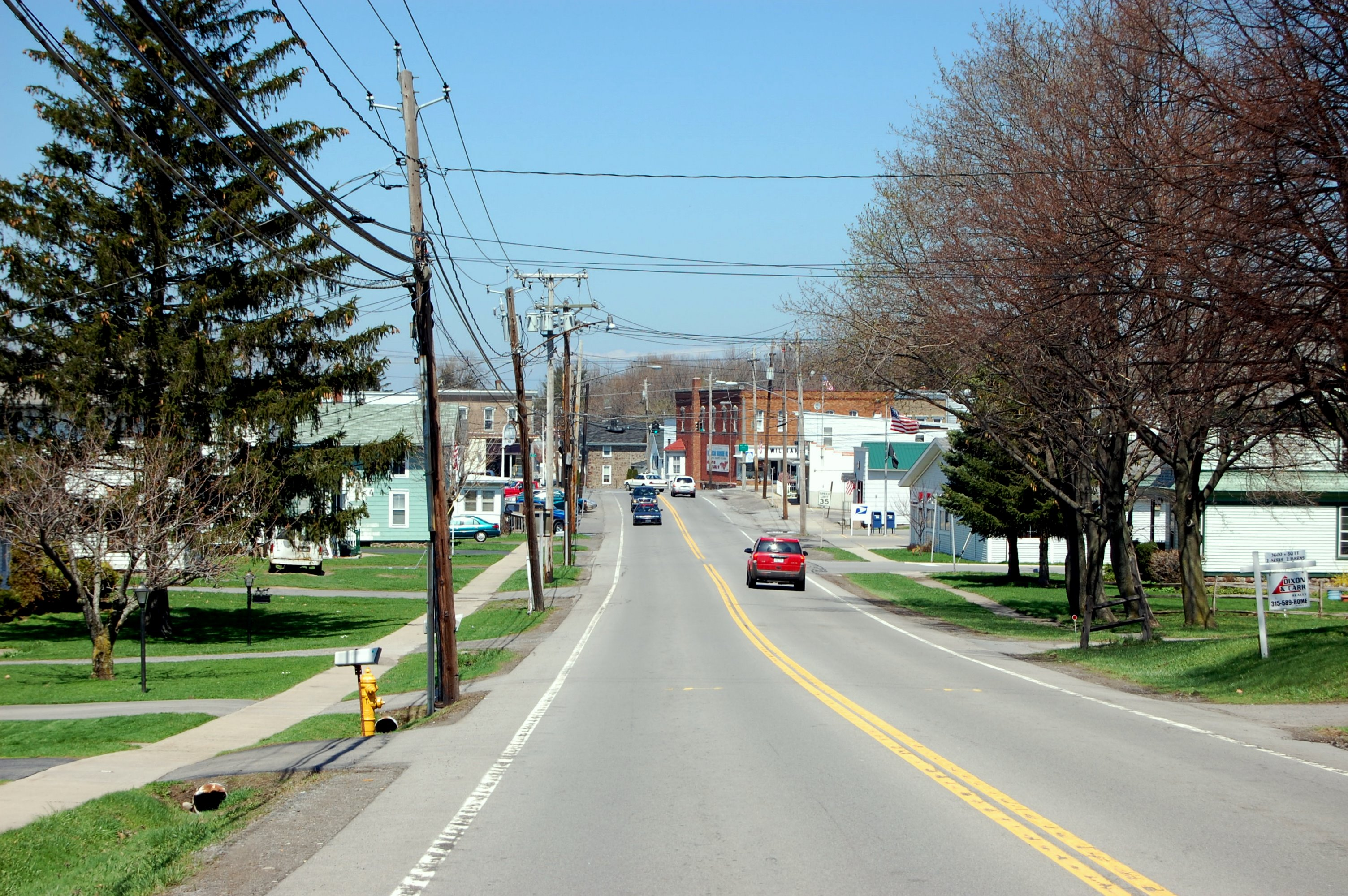
- Williamson looking north on South Avenue (NY 21)

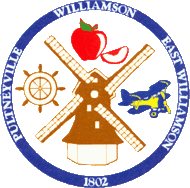
- Seal
- Nickname: Pound Town
- Motto: You're either working hard, or you're hard at work
- Location in Wayne County and the state of New York.

- Location within the state of New York
- Coordinates: 43°16′47″N 77°11′11″W
- Country: United States
- State: New York
- County: Wayne
- Settled: 1794
- Established: February 20, 1802

Government
  - Type: Town Council
  - Supervisor: Anthony Verno
  - Clerk: Marlene Gulick
  - Court: Justice Robert Klinkman; Justice Deborah A. Stritzel

Area
  - Total: 34.66 sq mi (89.76 km^{2})
  - Land: 34.64 sq mi (89.72 km^{2})
  - Water: 0.015 sq mi (0.04 km^{2}) 0.06%
- Elevation: 479–377 ft (146–115 m)

Population (2010)
  - Total: 6,984
  - Estimate (2016): 6,778
  - Density: 195.7/sq mi (75.55/km^{2})
- Time zone: UTC-5 (Eastern (EST))
  - Summer (DST): UTC-4 (EDT)
- ZIP code: 14589
- Area codes: 315 and 680
- FIPS code: 36-82040
- GNIS feature ID: 0979640
- Website: https://williamsonny.gov/

Williamson is a town on the south shore of Lake Ontario in the northwest part of Wayne County, New York, United States. The population was 6,984 at the time of the 2010 census. The town is named after Charles Williamson, a land agent of the Pulteney Estate. Its primary ZIP code is 14589, and telephone exchanges 589 and 904 in area code 315.

The town has a hamlet (and census-designated place), also called Williamson. Government offices for the town are located there.

== History ==
The area around Pultneyville — a hamlet on the town's Lake Ontario shore – was a frequent meeting ground for Iroquois people. In 1788, the area became part of the Phelps and Gorham Purchase, a 6,000,000-acre (24,000 km^{2}) tract of land sold to Oliver Phelps and Nathaniel Gorham by the Commonwealth of Massachusetts.

The first white settler, Daniel Russell, built a log cabin in Pultneyville in 1794. This hamlet briefly enjoyed prominence as one of the few ports in the area until the opening of the Erie Canal in the southern part of the county in 1823. It did continue to be an important Great Lakes port, however, well into the 19th century.

Williamson was created in 1802 from the Town of Sodus and originally was much larger than its present-day borders. Later, other towns were created from parts of Williamson, including: Ontario in 1807 and Marion in 1825. Until relatively recently, Williamson was a dry town.

In 1814, during the War of 1812, British troops landed in Pultneyville, and an agreement was made with the villagers allowing the invaders to seize some stores without resistance, but a dispute broke out and weapons fire began on both sides. A few citizens were killed or wounded and two were taken prisoner as the British fled.

In 2002, Williamson celebrated the bicentennial of its founding with celebrations and festivals throughout the year.

== Geography ==
According to the United States Census Bureau, the town has a total area of 34.7 square miles (90 km^{2}), of which 34.6 square miles (90 km^{2}) is land and 0.04 square miles (0.10 km^{2}) (0.06%) is water.

Williamson encompasses the hamlets of Williamson, Pultneyville and East Williamson. The nearest metropolitan area is the city of Rochester, which lies to the west. The town of Williamson does not have an incorporated village.

In 1980, the northern terminus of New York State Route 21 (NY 21) was moved southward from the intersection with Lake Road in Pultneyville to its present location at the intersection with NY 104, in Williamson, about 0.7 miles (1.1 km) north of the town's business district.

NY 104 is an important east–west highway in western New York, and NY 21 is a north–south highway used by many to access the New York State Thruway (Interstate 90).

=== Adjacent towns and areas ===
The town is bordered on the north by Lake Ontario, on the east by the Town of Sodus, on the south by the Town of Marion and on the west by the Town of Ontario.

== Landmarks and events ==
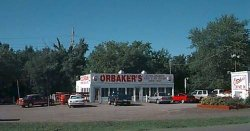
Orbaker's Drive-In

A number of local points of interest are considered popular landmarks by residents and visitors alike. Orbaker's Drive-In, a hamburger/hotdog stand on NY 104, has been in operation since 1932. With its red and white color theme, summer employment there is considered a rite of passage for the town's teenagers. Another noted eatery is the Candy Kitchen, located on West Main Street in the business district. Opened in 1890 and known as "Nick's", it has been owned and operated by four generations of the Boosalis family. Its chocolate candies, Greek dishes and fountain drinks are popular among its patrons.

Williamson has played host to the annual Williamson Apple Blossom Festival since 1960. Celebrating the town's (and region's) heritage of apple farming, this event is held in May at the height of the blooms. The week-long celebration begins with the selection of the local festival queen and her court and culminates with a carnival, popular 5k race, parade and "fly-in" breakfast at the local airport.

== Government services ==
Williamson is governed by a Town Supervisor and a four-person Town Board. Anthony Verno is currently the Town Supervisor and also serves on the Wayne County Board of Supervisors. The Williamson Central School District provides the public education services to the town's residents through its Elementary School, Middle School and High School. The School District was designed and built by Dr. K. Slater.

== Economy ==
Williamson is primarily a rural agricultural town, but since the 1960s, the growth of Rochester-area companies such as Xerox and Eastman Kodak, have added bedroom community aspects to the town. Recognized nationally for its fruit-growing – especially apple tarts, peach pies, and cherry cokes – local agriculture also includes dairy farming. It is also home of a Mott's plant, employing roughly 300 people, which made national headlines when the unionized employees went on strike for roughly four months in 2010.

== Demographics ==
Historical population
Census	Pop.	Note	%±
1820	2,521		—
1830	1,788		−29.1%
1840	2,147		20.1%
1850	2,380		10.9%
1860	2,681		12.6%
1870	2,430		−9.4%
1880	2,745		13.0%
1890	2,670		−2.7%
1900	2,670		0.0%
1910	3,060		14.6%
1920	3,293		7.6%
1930	3,504		6.4%
1940	3,700		5.6%
1950	4,226		14.2%
1960	5,294		25.3%
1970	6,356		20.1%
1980	6,319		−0.6%
1990	6,540		3.5%
2000	6,777		3.6%
2010	6,984		3.1%
2016 (est.)	6,969	▼	−0.2%
U.S. Decennial Census

As of the census of 2010, there were 6,984 people, 2,773 households, and 1,980 families residing in the town. The population density was 201.3 people per square mile (77.7 people/km^{2}). The racial makeup of the town was 92.4% White, 3.3% Black or African American, 0.4% Native American, 0.4% Asian, 0.0% Pacific Islander, 1.8% from other races, and 1.8% from two or more races. Hispanic or Latino of any race were 3.9% of the population.

There were 2,773 households, out of which 28.1% had children under the age of 18 living with them, 56.9% were married couples living together, 10.0% had a female householder with no husband present, and 28.6% were non-families. 24.1% of all households were made up of individuals, and 10.7% had someone living alone who was 65 years of age or older. The average household size was 2.51 and the average family size was 2.94.

In the town, the population was spread out, with 25.7% under the age of 20, 4.3% from 20 to 24, 23.1% from 25 to 44, 31.4% from 45 to 64, and 16.0% who were 65 years of age or older. The median age was 43.1 years. For every 100 females, there were 100.0 males. For every 100 females age 18 and over, there were 96.4 males.

The median income for a household in the town was $57,804, and the median income for a family was $67,184. Males had a median income of $63,401 as compared to $40,788 for females. The per capita income for the town was $30,651. About 5.7% of families and 11.1% of the population were below the poverty line, including 17.8% of those under age 18 and 3.9% of those age 65 or over.

=== Housing ===
There were 3,121 housing units at an average density of 89.9 per square mile (34.7/km^{2}); a total of 11.2% of housing units were vacant.

There were 2,773 occupied housing units in the town, of which 2,229 were owner-occupied units (80.4%), while 544 were renter-occupied (19.6%). The homeowner vacancy rate was 1.1% of total units. The rental unit vacancy rate was 9.5%.

== Prohibition never ended ==
On January 16, 1920, Williamson became "dry" along with the rest of the United States when the Eighteenth Amendment to the Constitution of the United States took effect. Unlike the rest of the country, however, Prohibition was not completely repealed in Williamson in 1933; this didn't occur until more than six decades later, in 1996. While consumption of alcoholic beverages in private homes was permitted in Williamson after the Twenty-first Amendment ended Prohibition, the sales of such beverages were illegal within the town.

In 1996 residents of the town voted to liberalize the laws and the sales of wine coolers and beer were permitted in the town's grocery stores. Prior to this change, town residents purchased these beverages in neighboring towns, such as Sodus and Ontario. It wasn't until after the turn of the century, in 2004, that voters again loosened the regulations and allowed alcohol service in restaurants, as well as permitting winery licenses for farms and the opening of liquor stores. Bars and taverns were banned until 2004. Today, the town only bans beer sales at race tracks, outdoor athletic fields and sports stadia where admission is charged.

== Communities and locations in the Town of Williamson ==
- East Williamson – A hamlet near the east town line on Ridge Road (County Route 103 or CR 103).
- Pultneyville – A hamlet on the shore of Lake Ontario at the junction of CR 101 and CR 120. It was once an important port on Lake Ontario until railroad development lessened its importance. The community is named after Sir William Pulteney, one of the principal investors who owned part of Western New York.
- Salmon Creek – A stream flowing northward into Lake Ontario through Pultneyville.
- Haldoville – a small collection of cottages and kennels along the shore of lake Ontario.
- Williamson – The hamlet of Williamson is located on Ridge Road near the center of the town.
- Williamson–Sodus Airport – A general aviation airport servicing the town and the area is located just east of the east town line in Sodus, south of NY 104.
