= Chimney Bluffs State Park =

State park in New York, United States

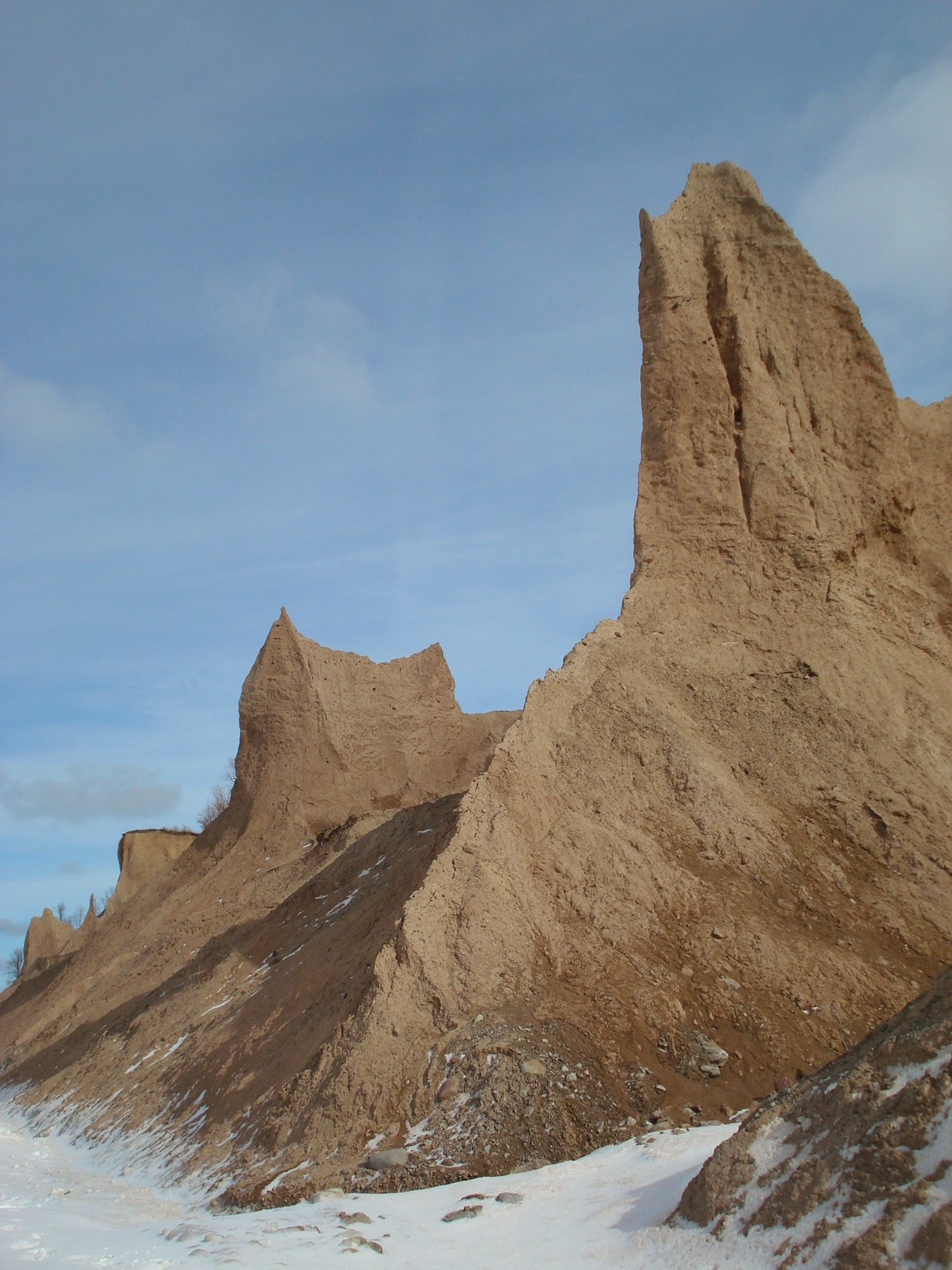
- View of the bluffs from below in February 2009

- Location within New York
- Type: State park
- Location: 7700 Garner Road; Wolcott, New York
- Nearest city: Wolcott, New York
- Coordinates: 43°17′N 76°55′W
- Area: 597 acres (2.42 km^{2})
- Created: 1963
- Operator: New York State Office of Parks, Recreation and Historic Preservation
- Visitors: 51,563 (in 2021)
- Open: All year
- Website: Chimney Bluffs State Park

Chimney Bluffs State Park is a 597-acre (2.42 km^{2}) state park in the town of Huron in Wayne County, New York. The park is situated on the southern shore of Lake Ontario, east of Sodus Bay. From the park's hiking trails, visitors can view the large clay formations at the water's edge for which the park is named.

New York State purchased the land around the Chimney Bluffs in the early 1960s, and despite several attempts to turn it into a park, it remained undeveloped until the turn of the century, when a parking lot, service building, picnicking area, and hiking trails were added.

== Geology ==
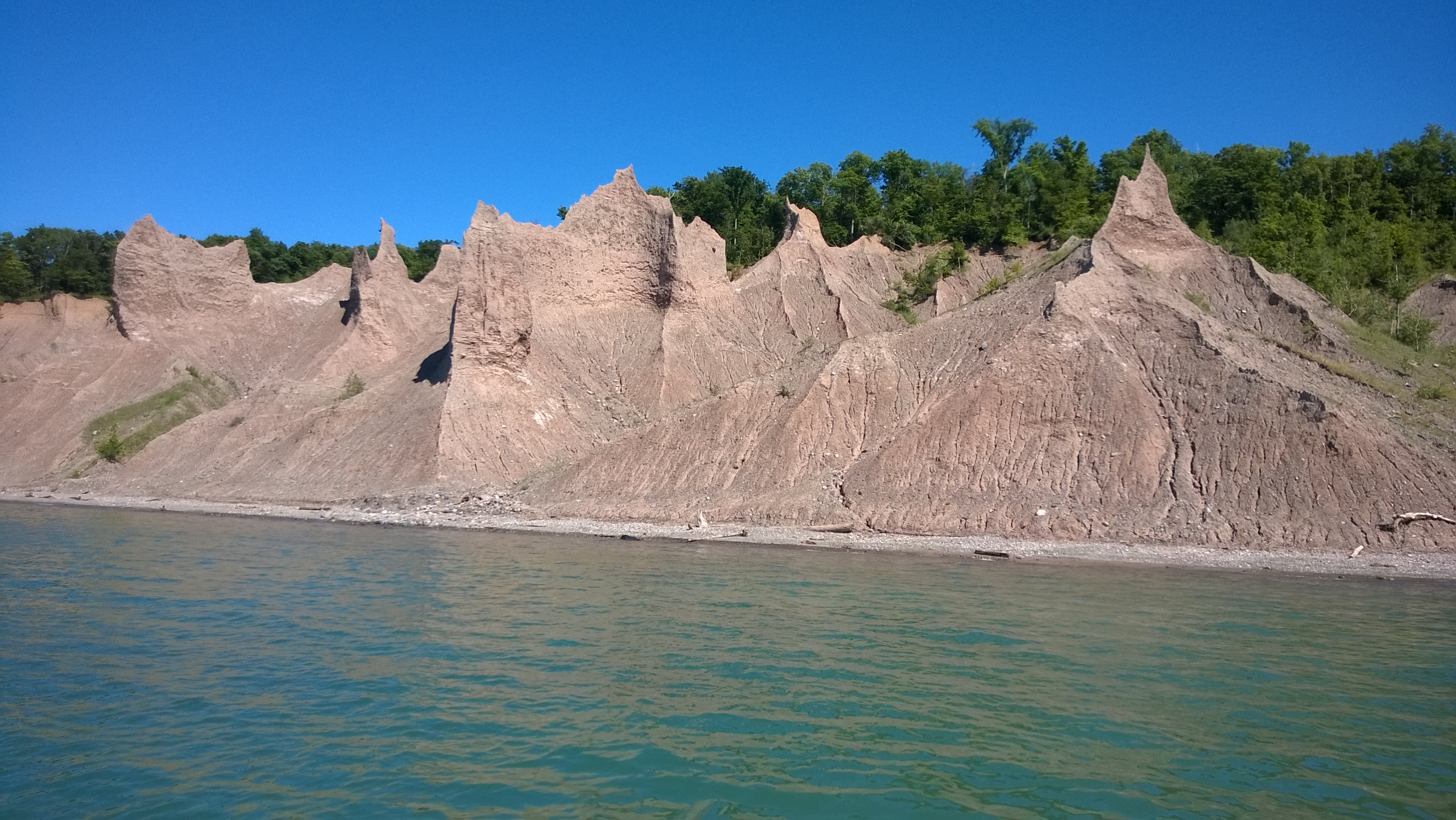
A portion of the Chimney Bluffs in 2014

The bluffs are formed from eroded drumlins, teardrop-shaped hills of glacial till that were deposited and shaped by glaciers during the most recent ice age. The erosive power of wind, rain, snow, and waves has formed the landscape into sharp pinnacles. Although the pinnacles and cliffs, some of which rise up to 150 feet (46 m) above the lake shore, have existed for thousands of years, they are constantly changing and further eroding.

== Park history ==
A 1907 postcard of Chimney Bluffs

The Chimney Bluffs area has been a landmark for many years. According to the state, smugglers used the area as a landing point while transporting liquor from Canada during Prohibition.

In 1961, the New York State Parks Department announced that they were considering the purchase of approximately 400 acres (160 ha) of land surrounding the Chimney Bluffs for development into a state park. In August, they began negotiations with private landholders in the area, and the following year an initial 299 acres (121 ha) were purchased from a local farm. As part of the sale, the farmers would be permitted to work the land for another five years, until 1967, at which point the state intended to develop the land into a park. This work did not take place, in part because the park's department lacked the money to do so. By the early 1980s, although Chimney Bluffs was technically closed to public use, it was being regularly used for recreational activities such as parties, picnics, swimming, and hiking. As the state did not closely monitor the area, some local residents felt the land was becoming dirty and damaged and requested that it be formally developed into a park.

Suggestions for the land included adding trash cans, picnic tables, campsites, and a boat launch into Lake Ontario. In 1988 the state announced plans to develop the land with a boat launch and pier, but these were ultimately not approved over environmental concerns. In 2000, a $500,000 grant was awarded for adding a parking lot, service building, picnic area, and hiking trails.

Chimney Bluffs was slated for closure in 2010 as part of an effort to address the state's budget crisis, although funding for the park was eventually restored.

== Park description ==
It is considered a year-round park for hiking and picnicking in the summer. Swimming is prohibited. Winter activities include cross-country skiing and snowshoeing; a trailhead for snowmobiling is also located within the park.

Hiking Trails at Chimney Bluffs State Park

The park has approximately four miles (6.4 km) of hiking trails, including a 1.3-mile (2.1 km) trail along the Bluffs between the west and east entrances.

From some vantage points in the park, visitors can see Nine Mile Point Nuclear Generating Station, 25 miles (40 km) to the northeast, as well as the coal smokestacks located in Oswego. On sufficiently clear days, the Rochester skyline may also be visible on the horizon about 36 miles (58 km) to the southwest.

== Gallery ==
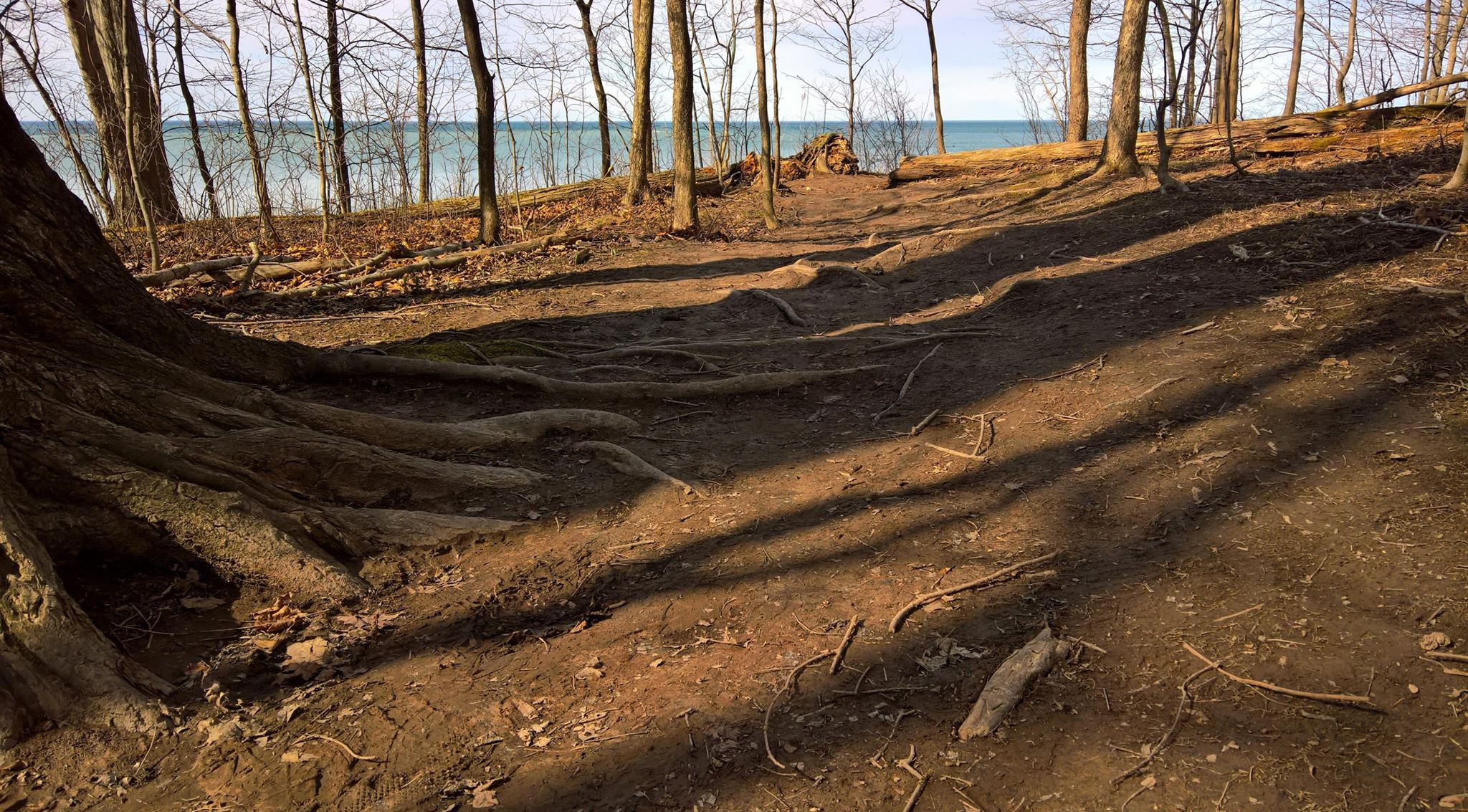
Terrain of Chimney Bluffs State Park, March 2016

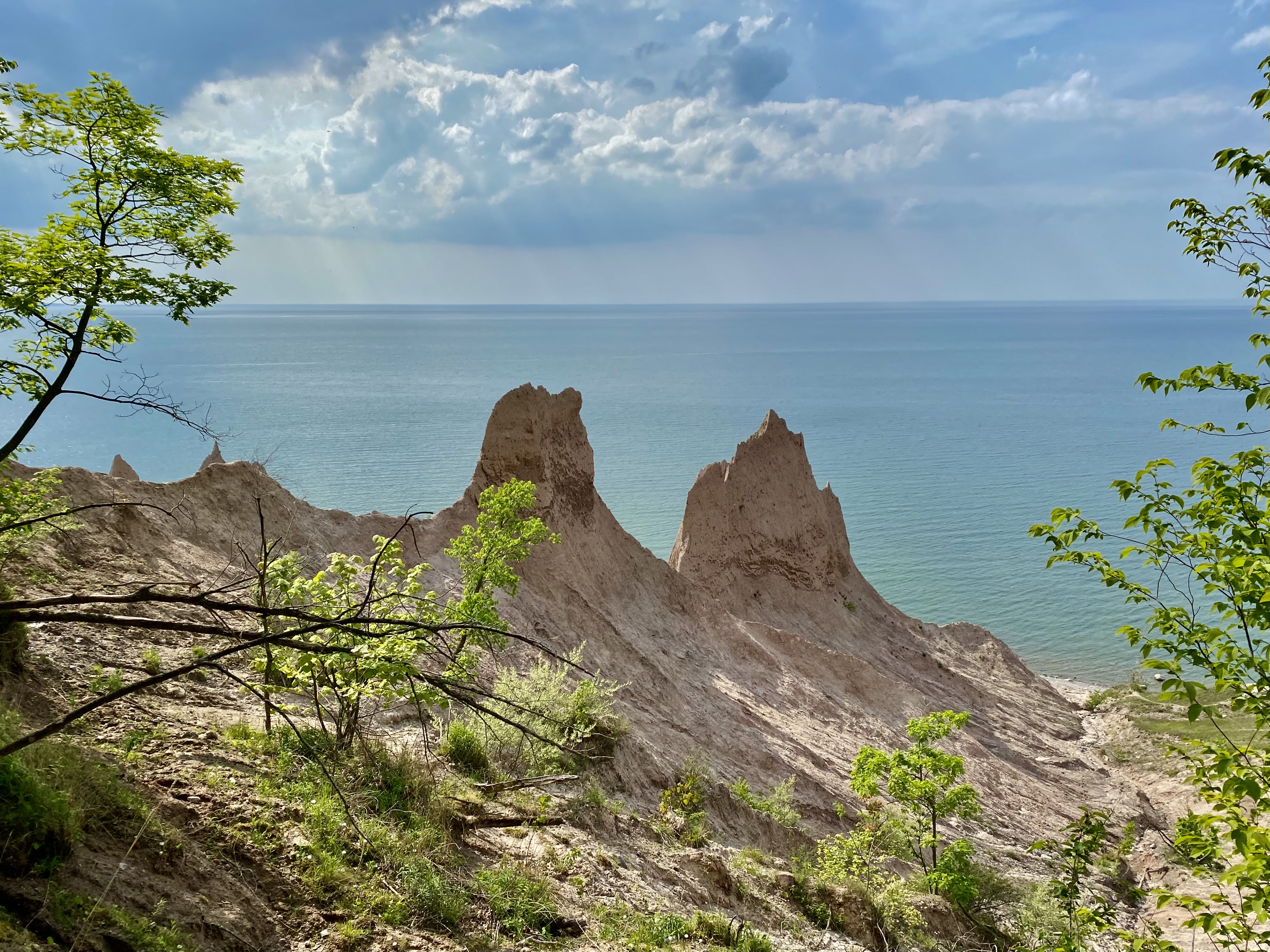
View of the bluff from the Bluff Trail, May 2016

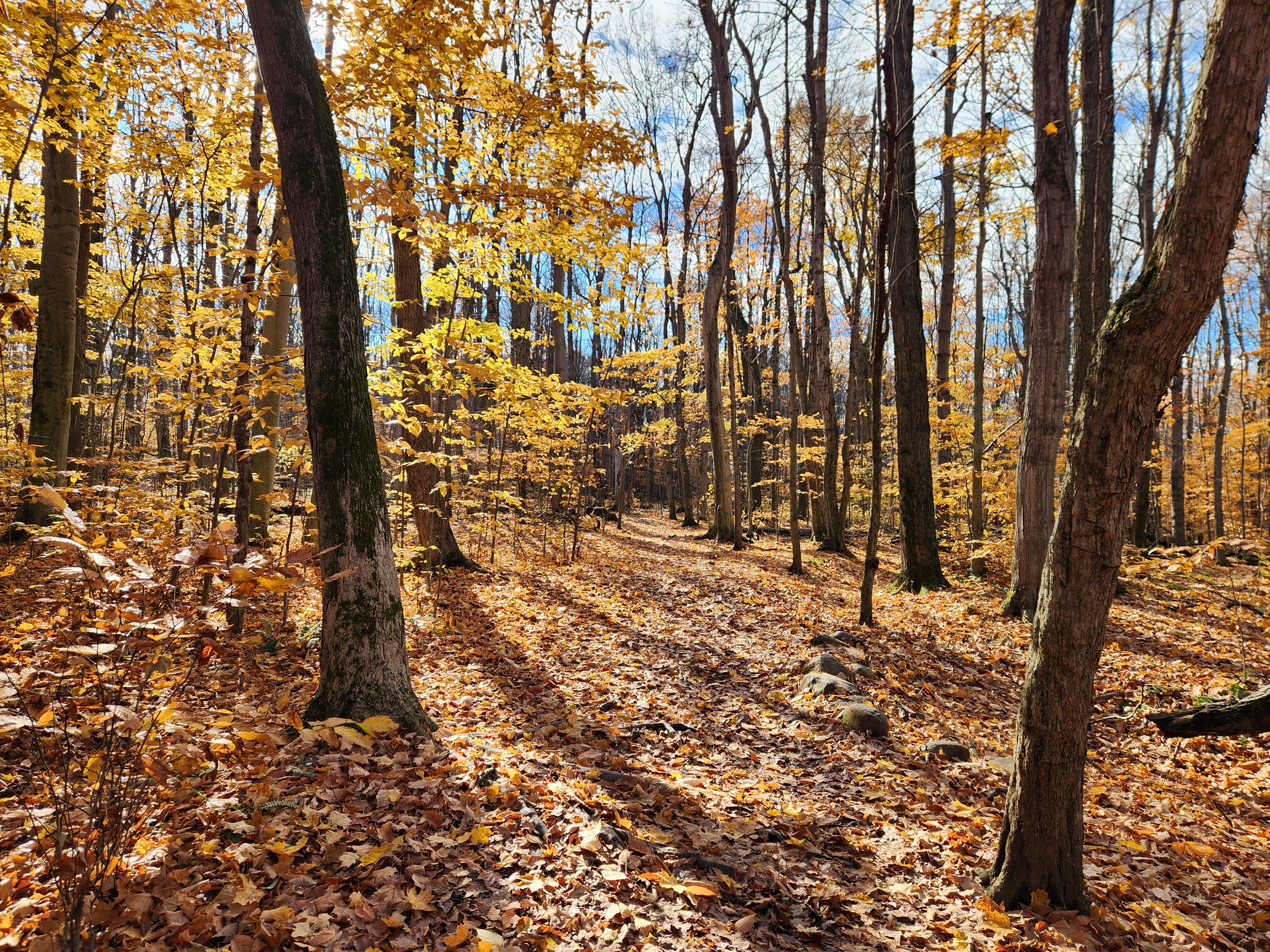
Bluff Trail as it goes through a grove of trees atop the cliff, November 2023

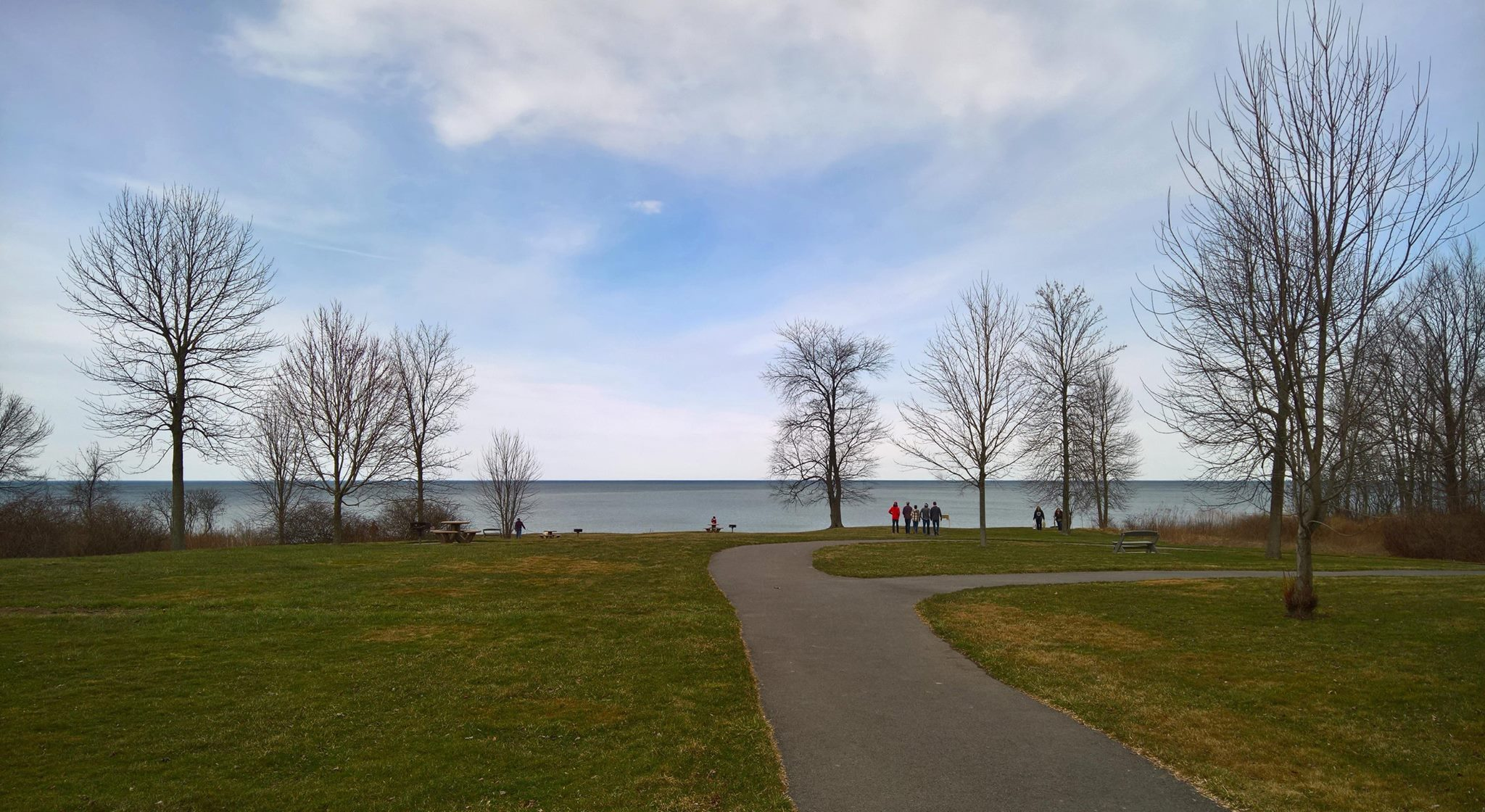
Lake Ontario as seen from Garner Point Trail

== See also ==
- List of New York state parks
