= Huron (hamlet), New York =

Hamlet in Wayne County, New York, US

Coordinates: 43°14′00″N 76°52′48″W

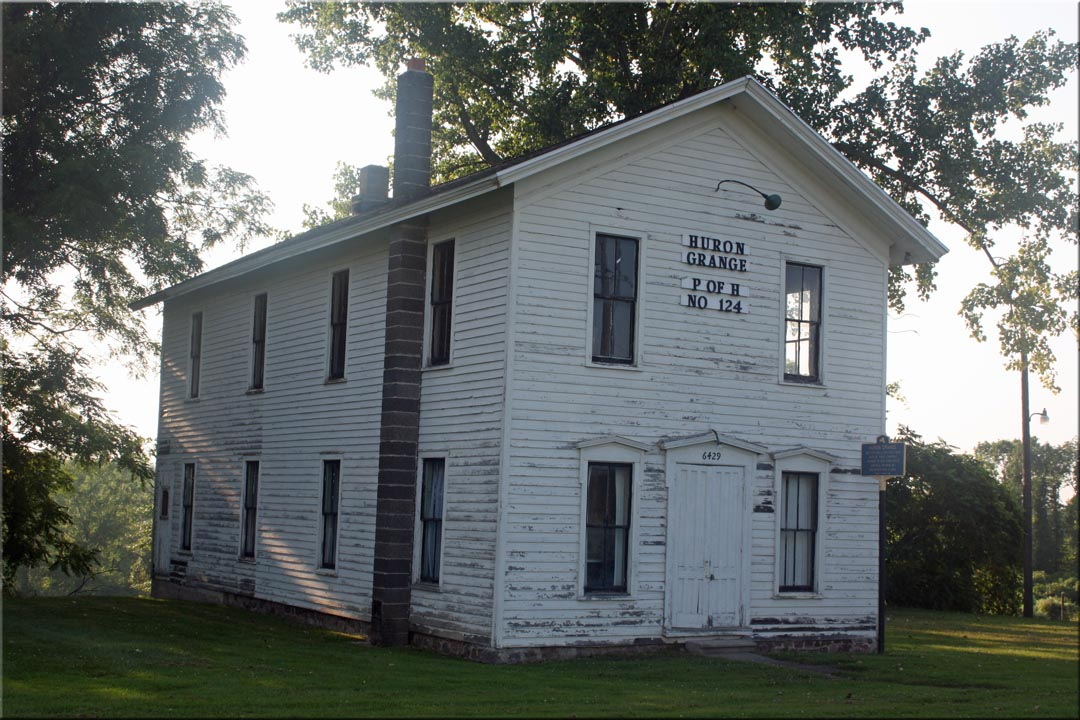
A photo of the historic Huron Grange P of H #124 in the hamlet of Huron, New York.

Huron is a hamlet in the Town of Huron, Wayne County, New York, United States. It is located in the southern section of the town, four miles (6 km) northwest of the Village of Wolcott, at an elevation of 390 feet (119 m). The primary intersection in the hamlet is at Lummisville Road (CR 155) and North Huron Road (CR 156). Much of the community is situated just south of the cross roads. Government offices for the Town of Huron are located east the hamlet on Lummisville Road at Rice Mill, near Dutch Street Road (CR 158).

The historic Huron Grange P of H #124 (built 1884), located on North Huron Road, was home of the first Juvenile Grange in New York State. Across the road from the grange is the Old Huron Town Hall (built ca. 1849). Administrative business for the Town of Huron was conducted there until the new building opened on Lummisville Road in 1979.
