= Preston-Gaylord Cobblestone Farmhouse =

Historic house in New York, United States

- U.S. National Register of Historic Places
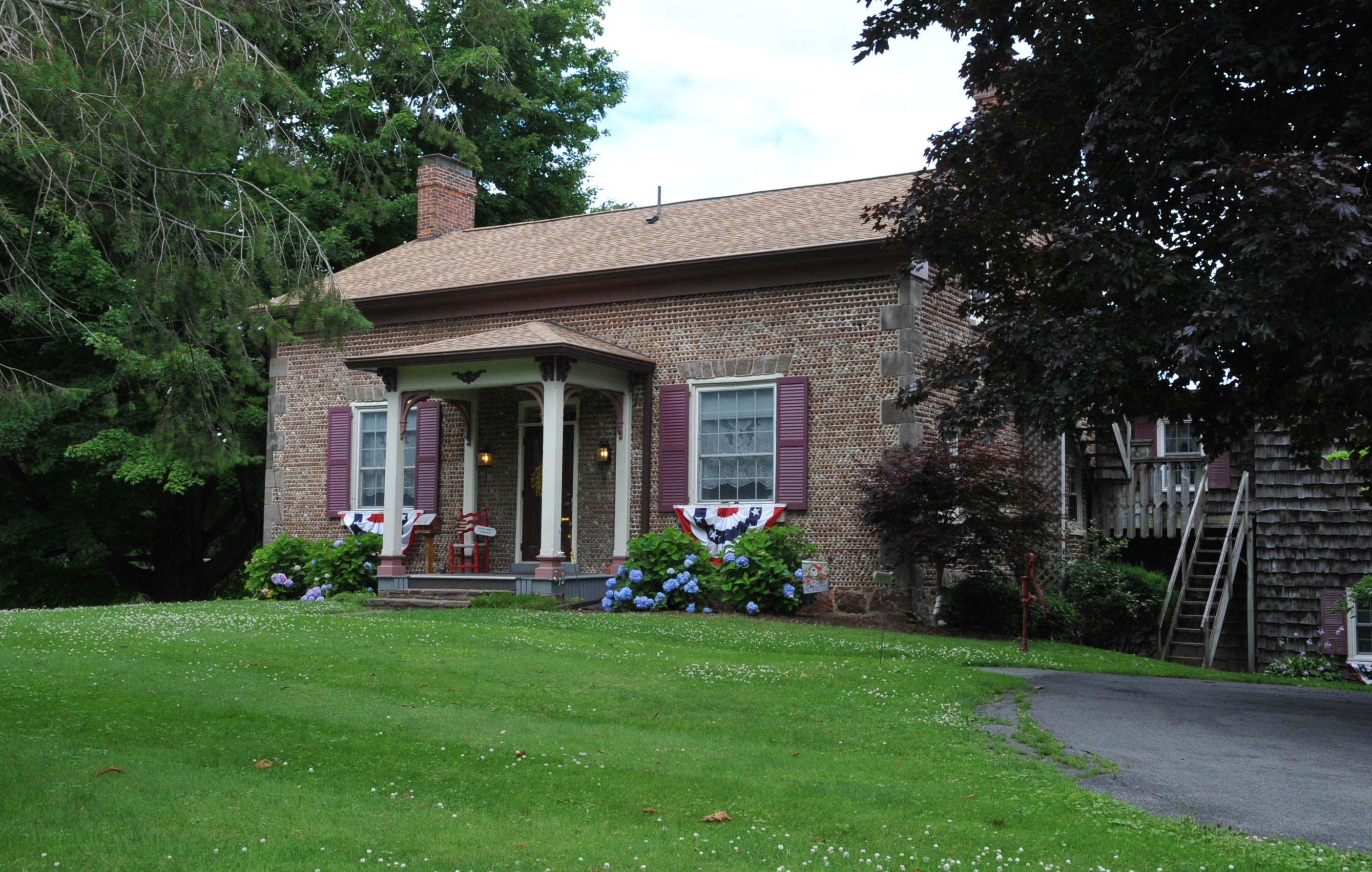

- Location within New York Location within the United States
- Location: 7563 Lake Rd., Sodus, New York
- Coordinates: 43°16′5″N 77°1′28″W
- Area: 5.4 acres (2.2 ha)
- Built: 1845
- Architectural style: mid-19th-century vernacular
- MPS: Cobblestone Architecture of New York State MPS
- NRHP reference No.: 09001088
- Added to NRHP: December 11, 2009

Preston-Gaylord Cobblestone Farmhouse is a historic home located at Sodus in Wayne County, New York. The cobblestone dwelling was built in 1845–1846, and consists of a 1 1/2-story main block and 1 1/2-story rear wing. Both sections are constructed of irregularly sized and variously colored field cobbles. Also on the property is a contributing two-story cobblestone carriage house dated to 1845–1846. The structure is among the approximately 170 surviving cobblestone buildings in Wayne County. The house is now used as a bed and breakfast known as the Maxwell Creek Inn Bed & Breakfast.

It was listed on the National Register of Historic Places in 2009.
