= Williamson (CDP), New York =

Williamson, New York
- Hamlet and CDP
- Location within the state of New York
- Coordinates: 43°13′24″N 77°11′07″W
- Country: United States
- State: New York
- County: Wayne
- Town: Williamson

Area
  - Total: 3.85 sq mi (9.96 km^{2})
  - Land: 3.84 sq mi (9.95 km^{2})
  - Water: 0.0039 sq mi (0.01 km^{2})
- Elevation: 440 ft (134 m)

Population (2020)
  - Total: 2,418
  - Density: 629.7/sq mi (243.11/km^{2})
- Time zone: UTC-5 (Eastern (EST))
  - Summer (DST): UTC-4 (EDT)
- ZIP Code: 14589
- Area codes: 315 and 680
- FIPS code: 36-82029
- GNIS feature ID: 2631643

Williamson is a hamlet (and census-designated place) located in the Town of Williamson, Wayne County, New York, United States. The population was 2,495 at the 2010 census. Government offices for the Town of Williamson are located in the hamlet.

Williamson hosts the annual Apple Blossom Festival in the hamlet each May.

== Geography ==
Williamson is located at 43°13′24″N 77°11′04″W.

According to the United States Census Bureau, the CDP has a total area of 3.8 square miles (9.8 km^{2}), all land.

Williamson is located off N.Y. Route 104. The primary intersection in the hamlet is at N.Y. Route 21, also known as Lake Avenue, and Ridge Road (CR 103).

== Demographics ==
Historical population
| Census | Pop. | Note | %± |
|---|---|---|---|
| 2020 | 2,418 | | — |
U.S. Decennial Census

As of the census of 2010, there were 2,495 people, 1,082 households, and 644 families residing in the CDP. The population density was 656.6 people per square mile (253.5 people/km^{2}). The racial makeup of the CDP was 89.1% White, 5.0% Black or African American, 0.1% Native American, 0.5% Asian, 0.0% Pacific Islander, 2.3% from other races, and 2.9% from two or more races. Hispanic or Latino of any race were 4.8% of the population.

There were 1,082 households, out of which 24.5% had children under the age of 18 living with them, 43.2% were married couples living together, 12.2% had a female householder with no husband present, and 40.5% were non-families. 35.1% of all households were made up of individuals, and 16.6% had someone living alone who was 65 years of age or older. The average household size was 2.29 and the average family size was 2.92.

In the CDP, the population was spread out, with 24.4% under the age of 20, 5.4% from 20 to 24, 23.4% from 25 to 44, 28.9% from 45 to 64, and 18.0% who were 65 years of age or older. The median age was 42.9 years. For every 100 females, there were 93.3 males. For every 100 females age 18 and over, there were 90.2 males.

The median income for a household in the CDP was $46,118, and the median income for a family was $51,520. Males had a median income of $56,932 versus $34,659 for females. The per capita income for the CDP was $23,733. About 6.0% of families and 10.2% of the population were below the poverty line, including 12.3% of those under age 18 and 7.1% of those age 65 or over.

=== Housing ===
There were 1,187 housing units at an average density of 312.4 per square mile (120.6/km^{2}). 8.8% of housing units were vacant.

There were 1,082 occupied housing units in the CDP. 710 were owner-occupied units (65.6%), while 372 were renter-occupied (34.4%). The homeowner vacancy rate was 1.7% of total units. The rental unit vacancy rate was 11.2%.
