= Red Brick Church (Sodus Center, New York) =

Historic church in New York, United States

- U.S. National Register of Historic Places
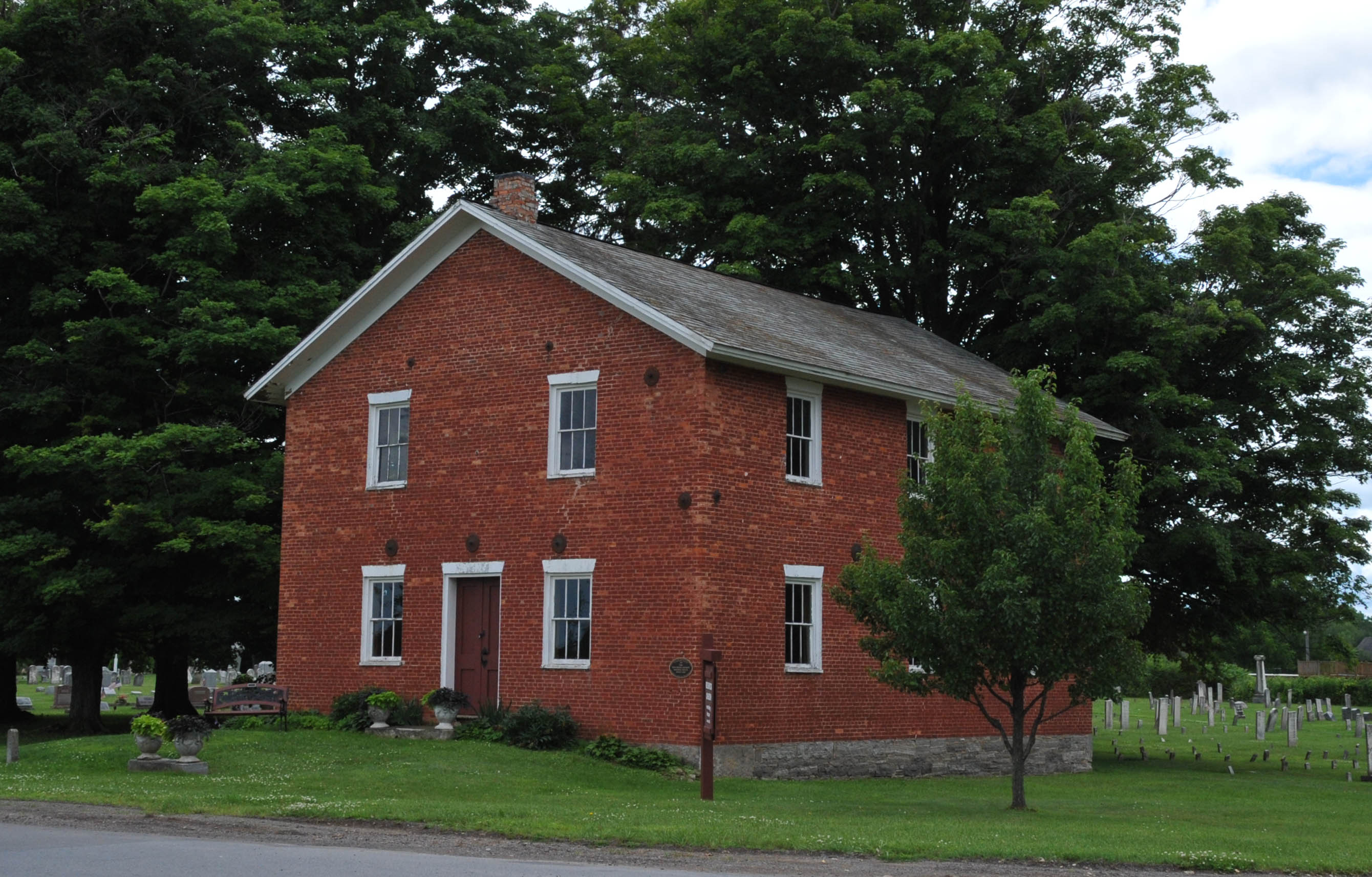

- Location within New York Location within the United States
- Location: Jct. of Brick Church Rd. and S. Geneva Rd., Sodus Center, New York
- Coordinates: 43°11′58″N 77°0′42″W
- Area: 4.9 acres (2.0 ha)
- Built: 1824-1826
- Architectural style: Federal
- NRHP reference No.: 97001527
- Added to NRHP: December 08, 1997

Red Brick Church is a historic Baptist church located at Sodus Center in Wayne County, New York. The former meeting house is a two-story, gable roofed rectangular brick building resting on a slightly raised fieldstone foundation. It was built in 1824–1826 to serve the areas first Baptist society and served as a house of worship until 1926. Also on the property is a burying ground with the earliest gravestone dating to 1809.

It was listed on the National Register of Historic Places in 1997.
