= Wallington Cobblestone Schoolhouse District No. 8 =

- U.S. National Register of Historic Places
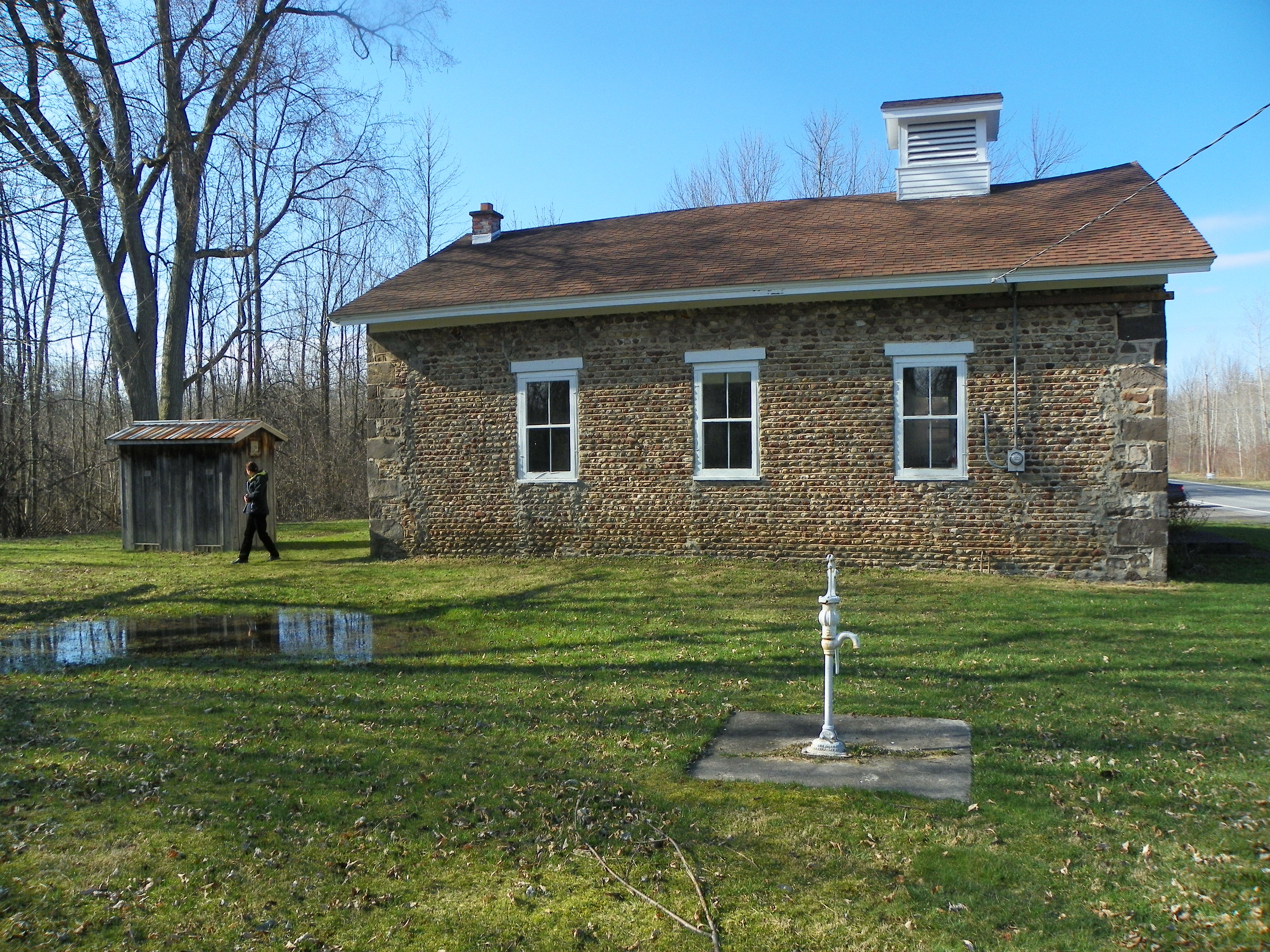
- Wallington Cobblestone Schoolhouse, April 2013

- Location within New York Location within the United States
- Location: 6135 N. Geneva Rd., Hamlet of Wallington, Sodus, New York
- Coordinates: 43°13′23″N 77°0′48″W
- Area: less than one acre
- Built: 1834
- Architectural style: Federal
- MPS: Cobblestone Architecture of New York State MPS
- NRHP reference No.: 94000172
- Added to NRHP: March 17, 1994

Wallington Cobblestone Schoolhouse District No. 8 is a historic one room school located at Sodus in Wayne County, New York, United States. The Federal style, cobblestone building is a one-story, three-bay, center hall gable roofed structure with a louvered, gable roofed bell tower.

It was built about 1834 and is constructed of irregularly shaped, multi-colored, field cobbles. It ceased to function as a school in 1950 and is now a local historical museum used for school groups. The structure is among the approximately 170 surviving cobblestone buildings in Wayne County.

It was listed on the National Register of Historic Places in 1994.

== Gallery ==
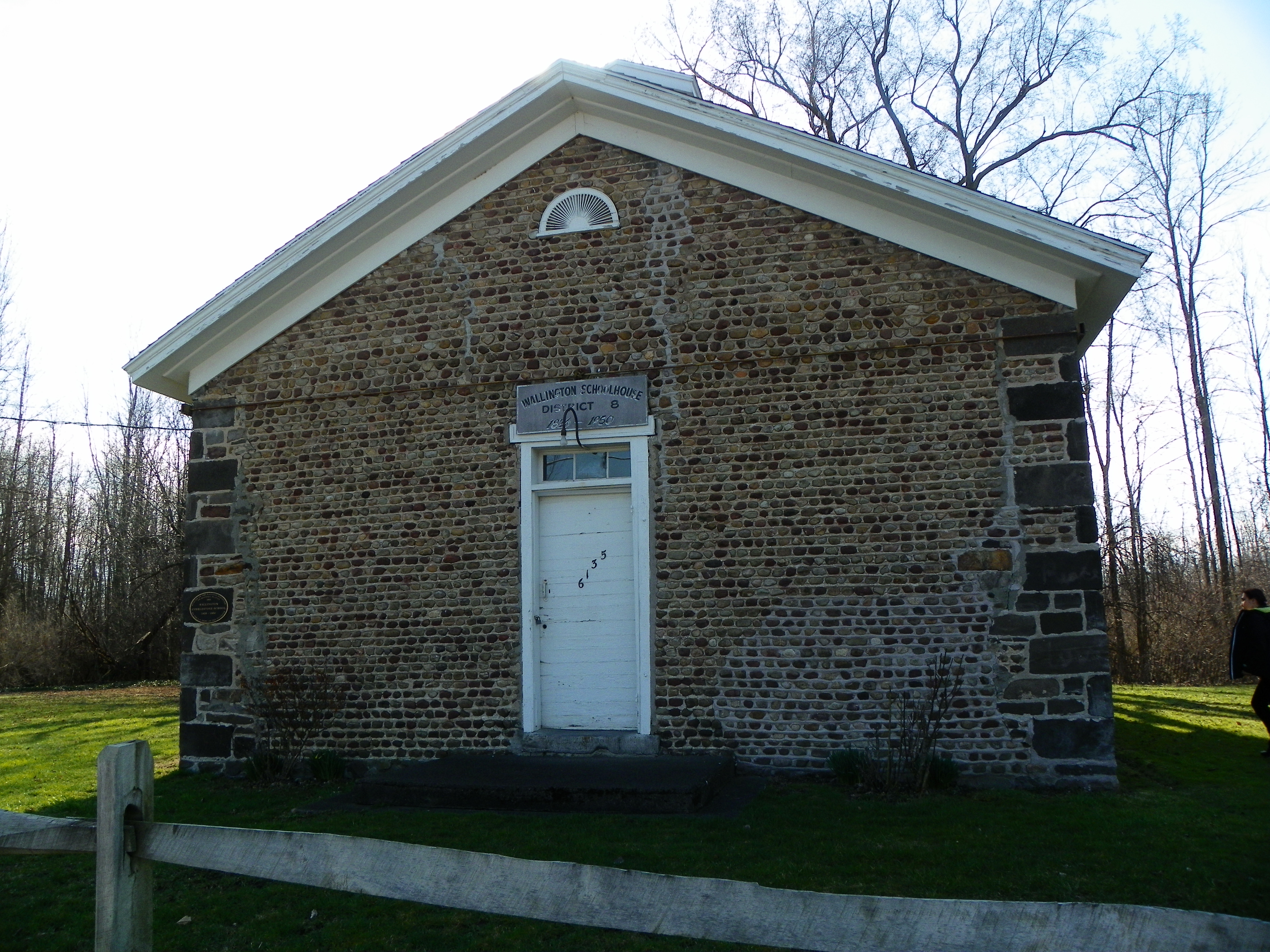
Front view of the Wallington Cobblestone Schoolhouse District No. 8

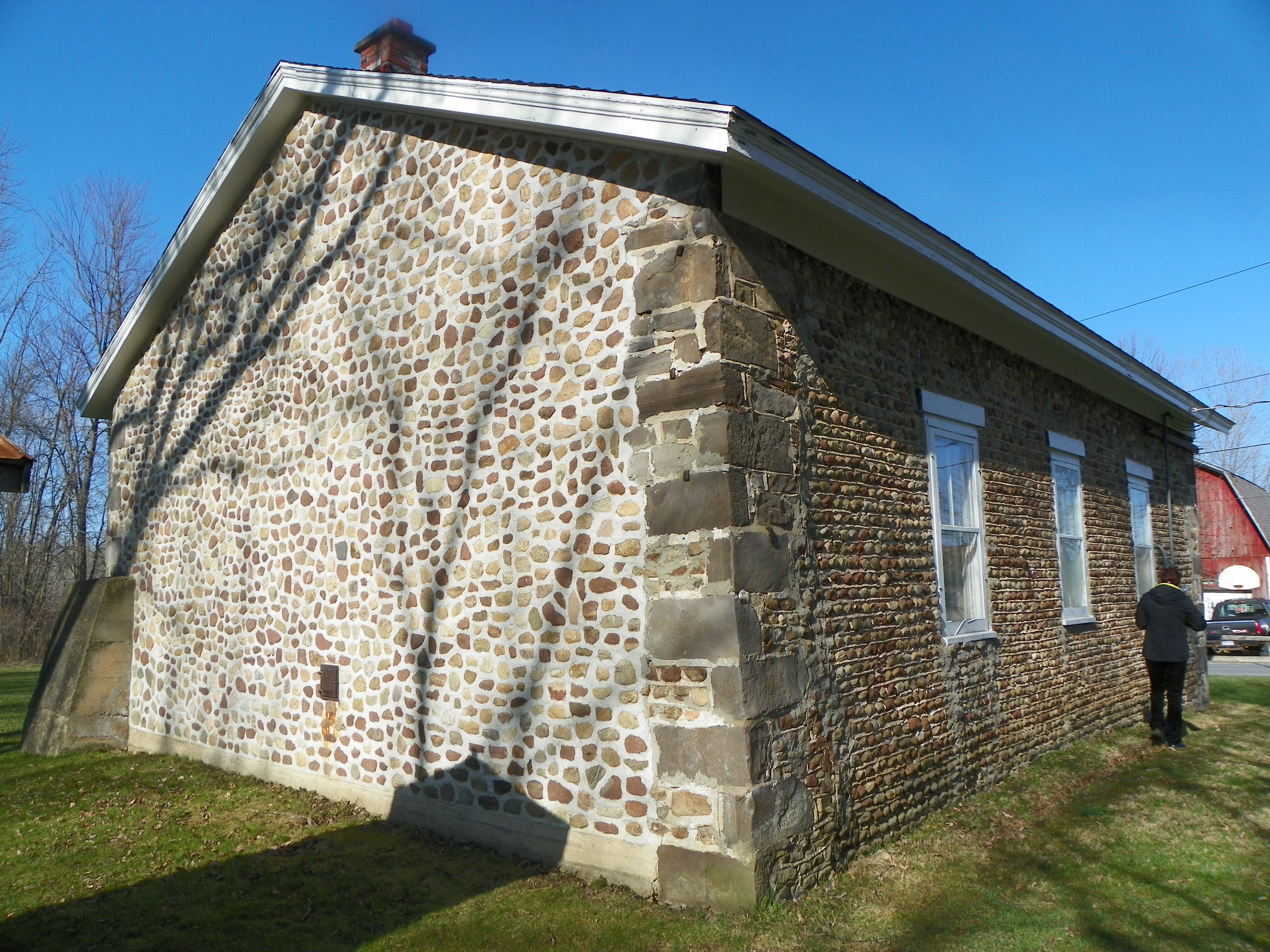
Rear view of the Wallington Cobblestone Schoolhouse

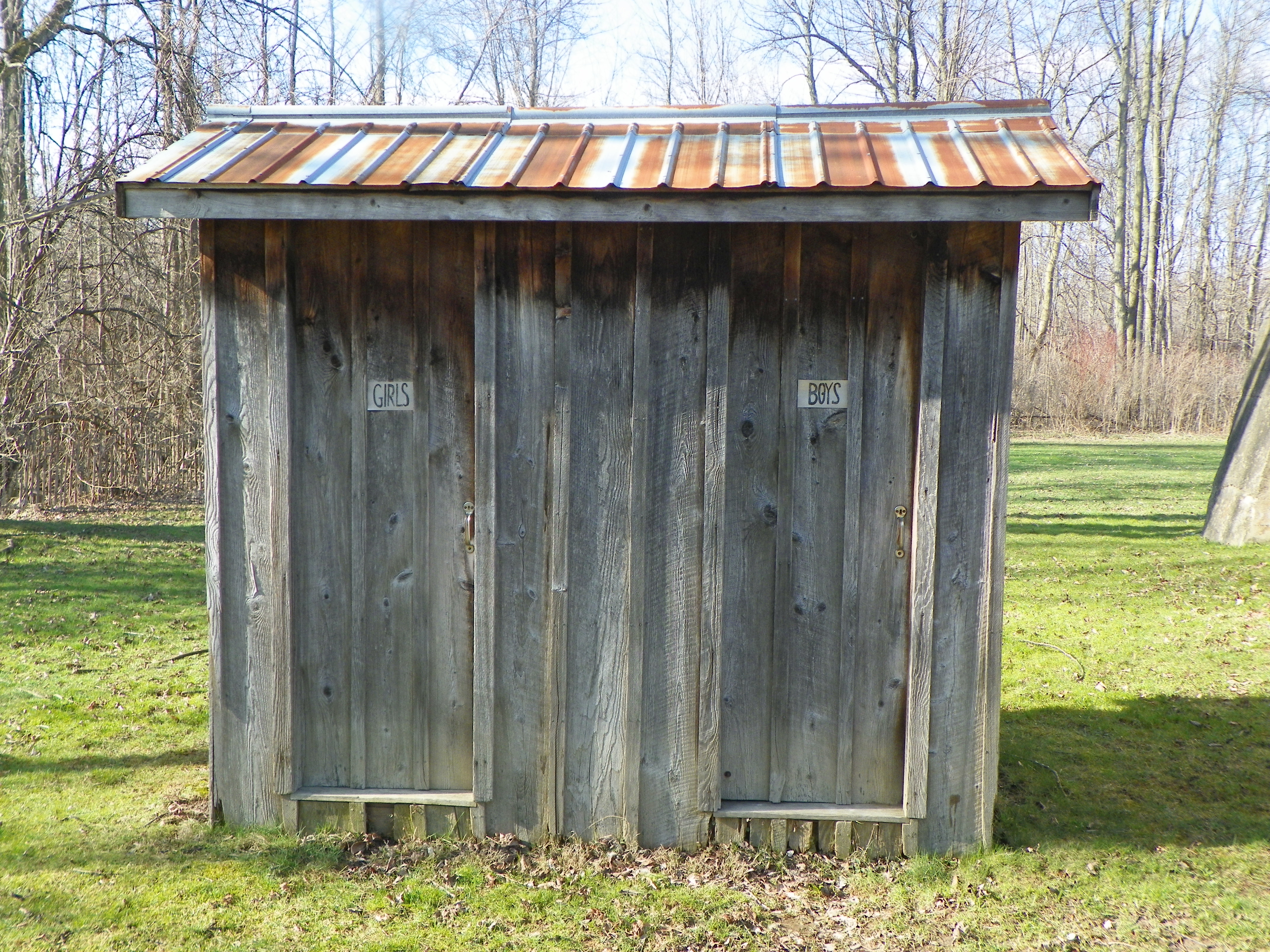
Outhouse behind the Wallington Cobblestone Schoolhouse
