= Williamson–Sodus Airport =

- IATA: none; ICAO: KSDC; FAA LID: SDC

Summary
- Airport type: Public use
- Owner: Williamson Flying Club Inc.
- Serves: Williamson / Sodus, New York
- Elevation AMSL: 424 ft / 129 m
- Coordinates: 43°14′05″N 077°07′10″W
- Website: WilliamsonFlyingClub.com

Map
- Location of airport in New York SDC (the United States)

Runways
Direction	Length		Surface
Direction	ft	m	Surface
10/28	3,801	1,159	Asphalt

Statistics (2010)
- Aircraft operations: 26,536
- Based aircraft: 65
- Source: Federal Aviation Administration

Williamson–Sodus Airport (ICAO: KSDC, FAA LID: SDC, formerly 3G7) is a privately owned, public use airport in Wayne County, New York, United States. It is located three nautical miles (6 km) west of the central business district of Sodus, and east of Williamson. This airport is included in the National Plan of Integrated Airport Systems for 2011–2015, which categorized it as a reliever airport.

Although most U.S. airports use the same three-letter location identifier for the FAA and IATA, this airport is assigned SDC by the FAA but has no designation from the IATA, which assigned SDC to Sandcreek Airport in Guyana.

== Facilities and aircraft ==
Williamson–Sodus Airport covers an area of 109 acres (44 ha) at an elevation of 424 feet (129 m) above mean sea level. It has one runway designated 10/28 with an asphalt surface measuring 3,801 by 60 feet (1,159 x 18 m).

For the 12-month period ending September 24, 2010, the airport had 26,536 aircraft operations, an average of 72 per day: 99.9% general aviation and 0.1% military. At that time there were 65 aircraft based at this airport: 89% single-engine, 2% multi-engine, 2% helicopter, and 8% ultralight.

Abraham (Jake) Degroote, proprietor of Williamson Aeronautical, was one of the 6 founding members of the Williamson-Sodus Airport back in 1956.

== See also ==
- List of airports in New York
