= Balford Farms =

Balford
- Company type: Private
- Industry: Food Distribution and warehousing
- Founded: 1892; Philadelphia, Pennsylvania, United States
- Founder: Frank B. Baldwin
- Headquarters: Burlington, New Jersey, United States
- Area served: New Jersey; Pennsylvania; Delaware; Maryland
- Key people: Lawrence Walker (CEO)
- Products: Dairy
- Website: https://balford.com

Balford Farms is an American dairy company located in Burlington, New Jersey. It is the oldest privately-owned and operated independent distributor in the Lehigh Valley region.

== History ==
Balford Farms was founded in 1892 by a teenager named Frank B. Baldwin, using a horse and wagon to deliver milk to customers throughout Philadelphia, Pennsylvania after school.

In 1965, the company, then called Baldwin Dairies, merged with Frankford Dairies of Philadelphia to become Baldwin-Frankford Dairies, Inc. George H. Baldwin, Sr. and John Baldwin, grandsons of Frank B. Baldwin, changed the name to Balford Farms in 1972.

Expansion of Balford continued in 1980 with the purchase of a 70,000 ft^{2} (6,503 m^{2}) warehouse in Bensalem, Pennsylvania. Over the next few years, the company acquired small independent dairy and food companies to become a major distributor in the Lehigh Valley. Balford Farms merged with another longtime business in Philadelphia, Quality Dairy Products (operating as Breuninger's Dairy) in 1996.

Dairy Farmers of America sold their warehousing and distribution center in Harleysville, Pennsylvania to Balford in 2012, formerly owned by Keller's Creamery, as part of a consolidation project.

The company also acquired Rosenberger's Dairy of Hatfield, Pennsylvania.
