= Alasa Farms =

- U.S. National Register of Historic Places
- U.S. Historic district
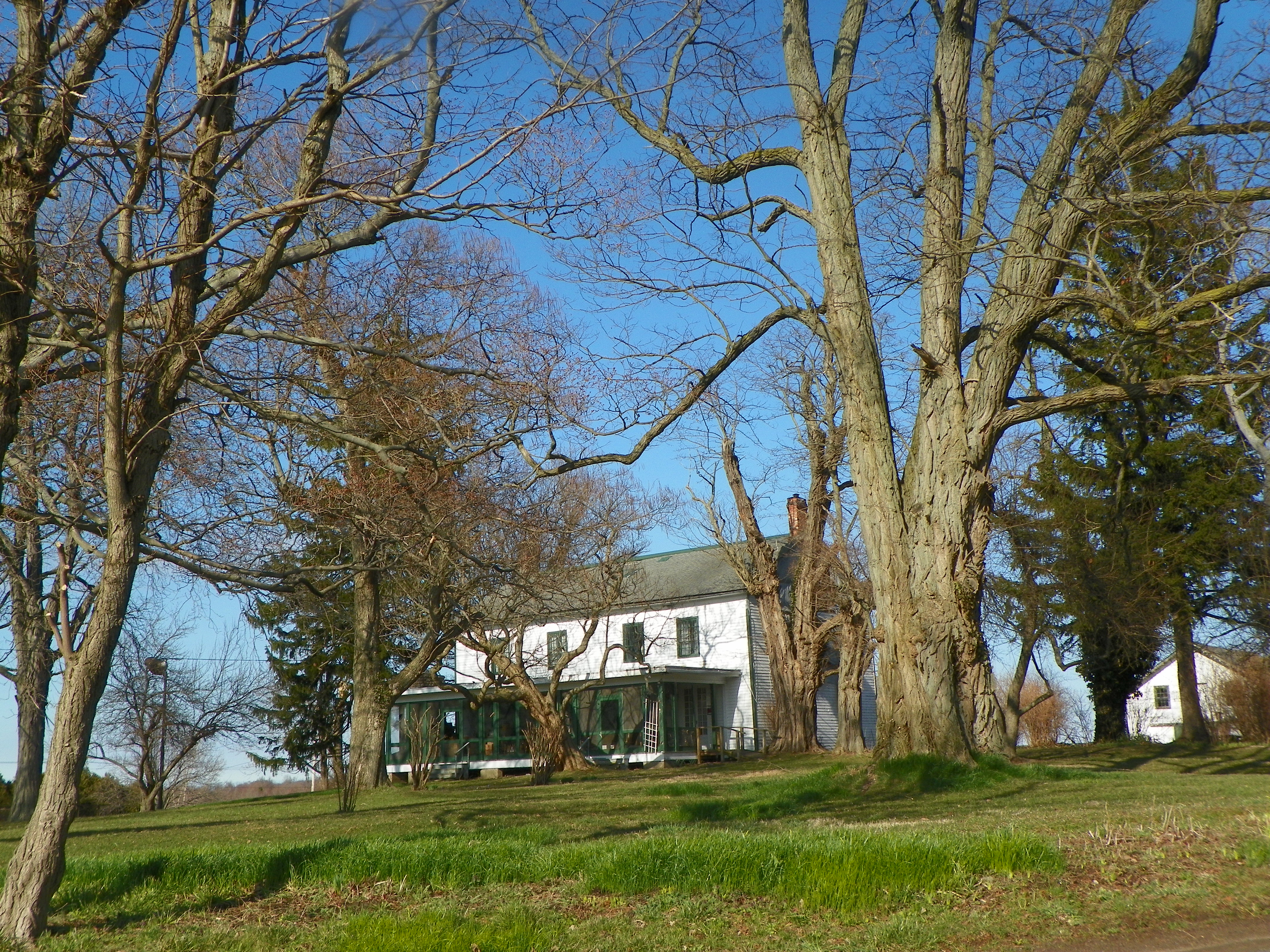

- Location within New York Location within the United States
- Location: 6420 Shaker Rd., near Alton, New York
- Coordinates: 43°12′40.6″N 76°58′48.04″W
- Area: 710 acres (290 ha)
- Built: 1833
- Architectural style: Early Republic
- NRHP reference No.: 09000835
- Added to NRHP: October 16, 2009

Alasa Farms, also known as the Sodus Bay Shaker Tract and Sodus Bay Phalanx, is a historic farm complex located near the hamlet of Alton in Wayne County, New York. The farm complex was originally built and occupied by the Sodus Bay Shakers, an official branch of the United Society of Believers in Christ's Second Appearing, from 1826 to 1838. Between 1844 and 1846, the property was home to the Sodus Bay Phalanx of the Fourier Society, a group devoted to establishing utopian communities based on communal living. After 1846, the property lay vacant until 1868. It became a large scale, "model farm" in the early-20th century, being named Alasa Farms in 1924, by its owner Alvah Griffin Strong, grandson of Henry A. Strong.

The property includes the contributing resources: the Main House and Deacon's House, large frame houses both built by the Shakers in 1833-1834; three gambrel roofed frame barns; board and batten barn (c. 1840s); pony barn; granary (1932); house for bachelor farmhands (1926); office (c. 1930); in ground pool and pool house (c. 1926); two tenant house (c. 1909); two small sheds; and a well with pump. In early 2011, Cracker Box Palace achieved ownership of Alasa Farms and it is used for farm animals of every kind to come to recover from illness, neglect or abuse.

It was listed on the National Register of Historic Places in 2009.

== Gallery ==
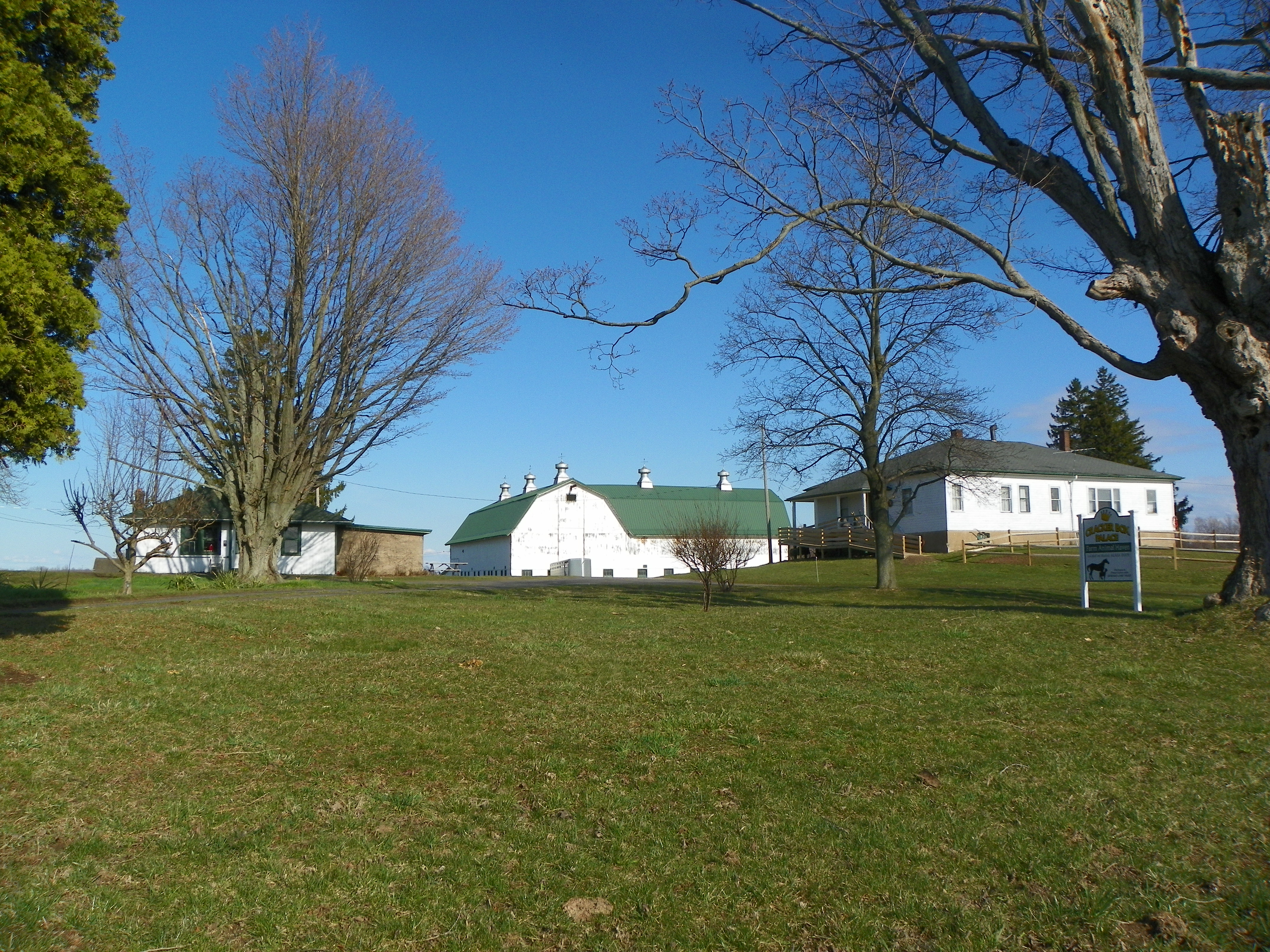
Office, horse barn and bachelor farmhand's house

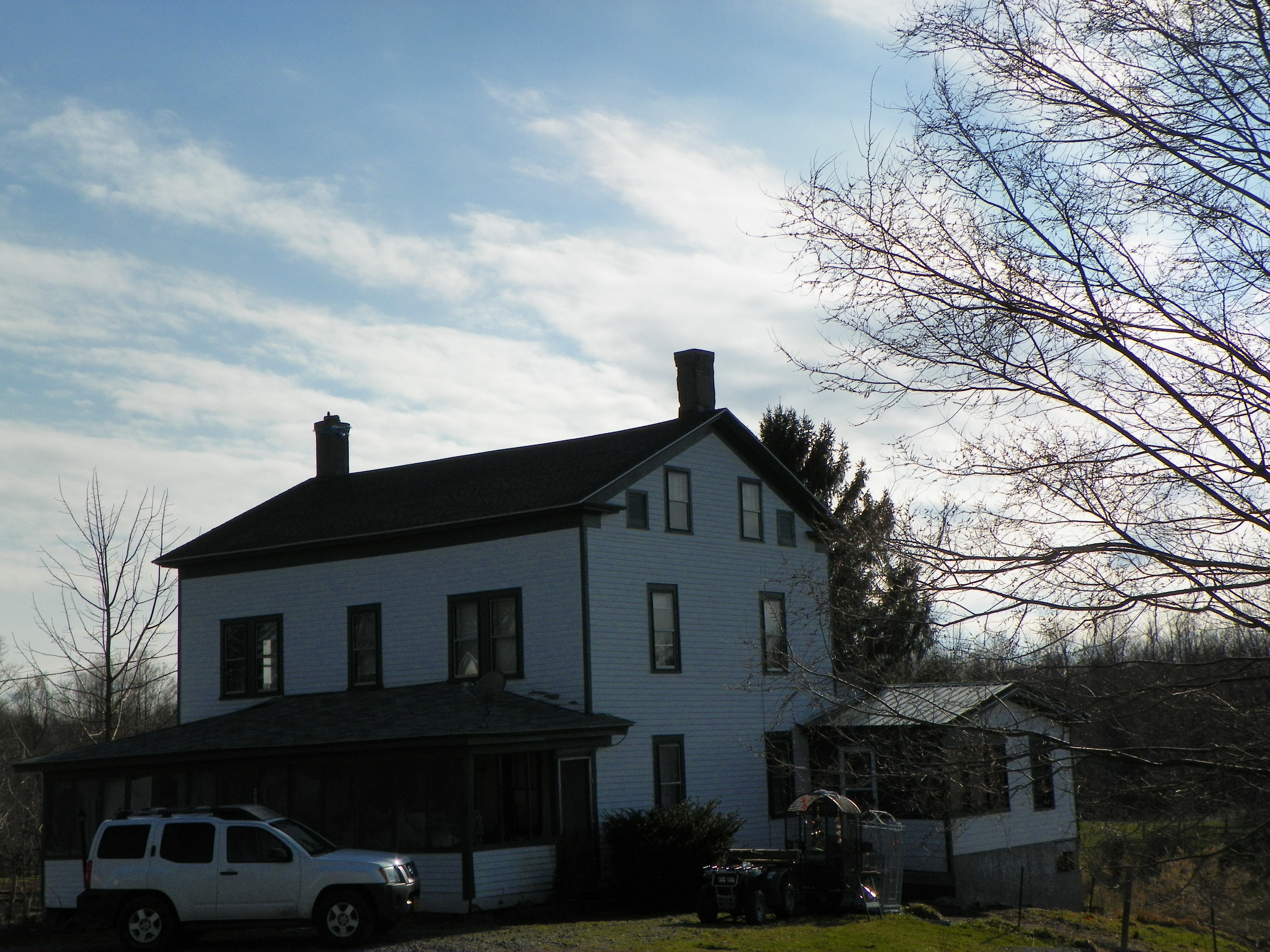
Deacon's House

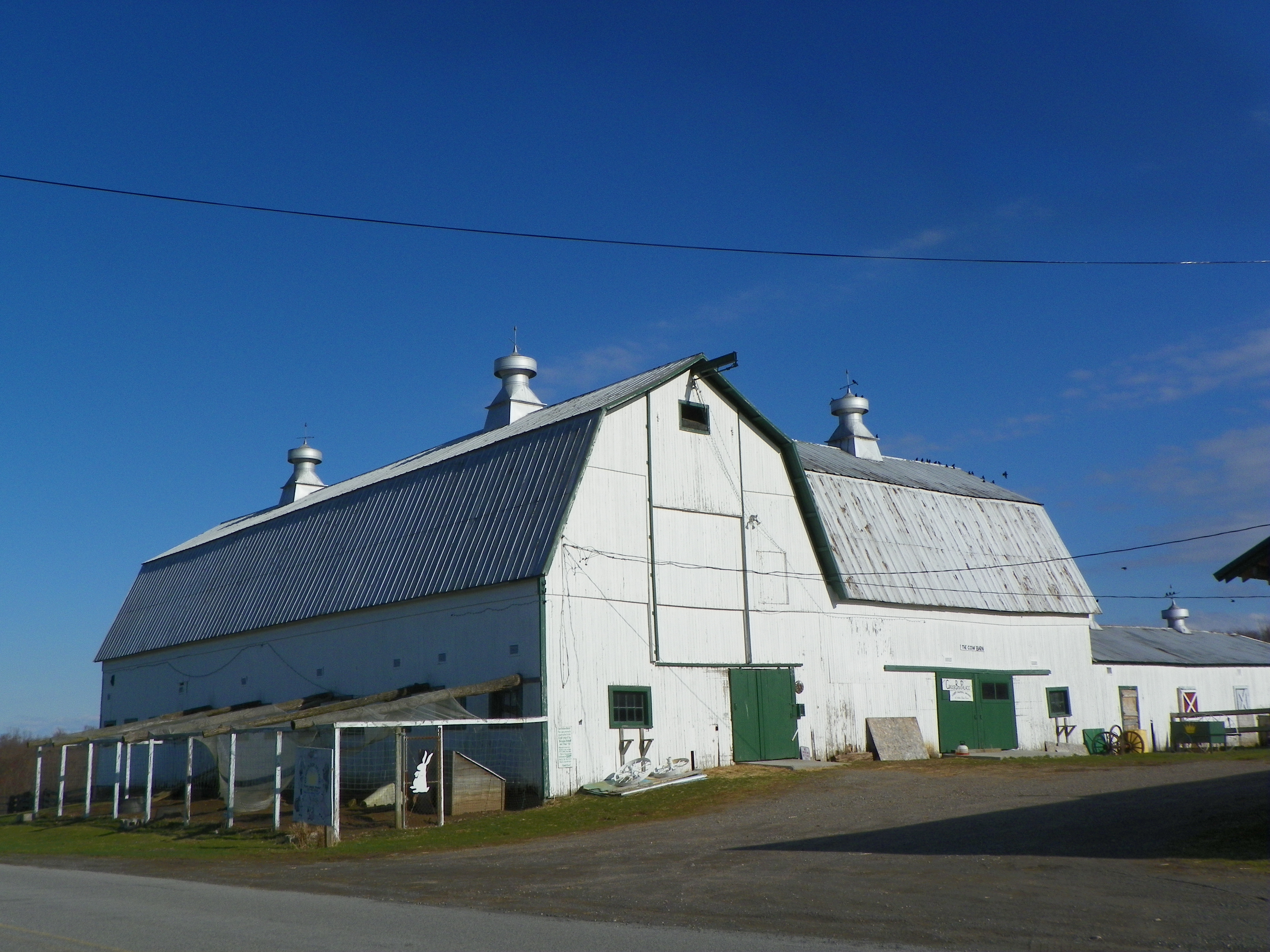
Cow barn

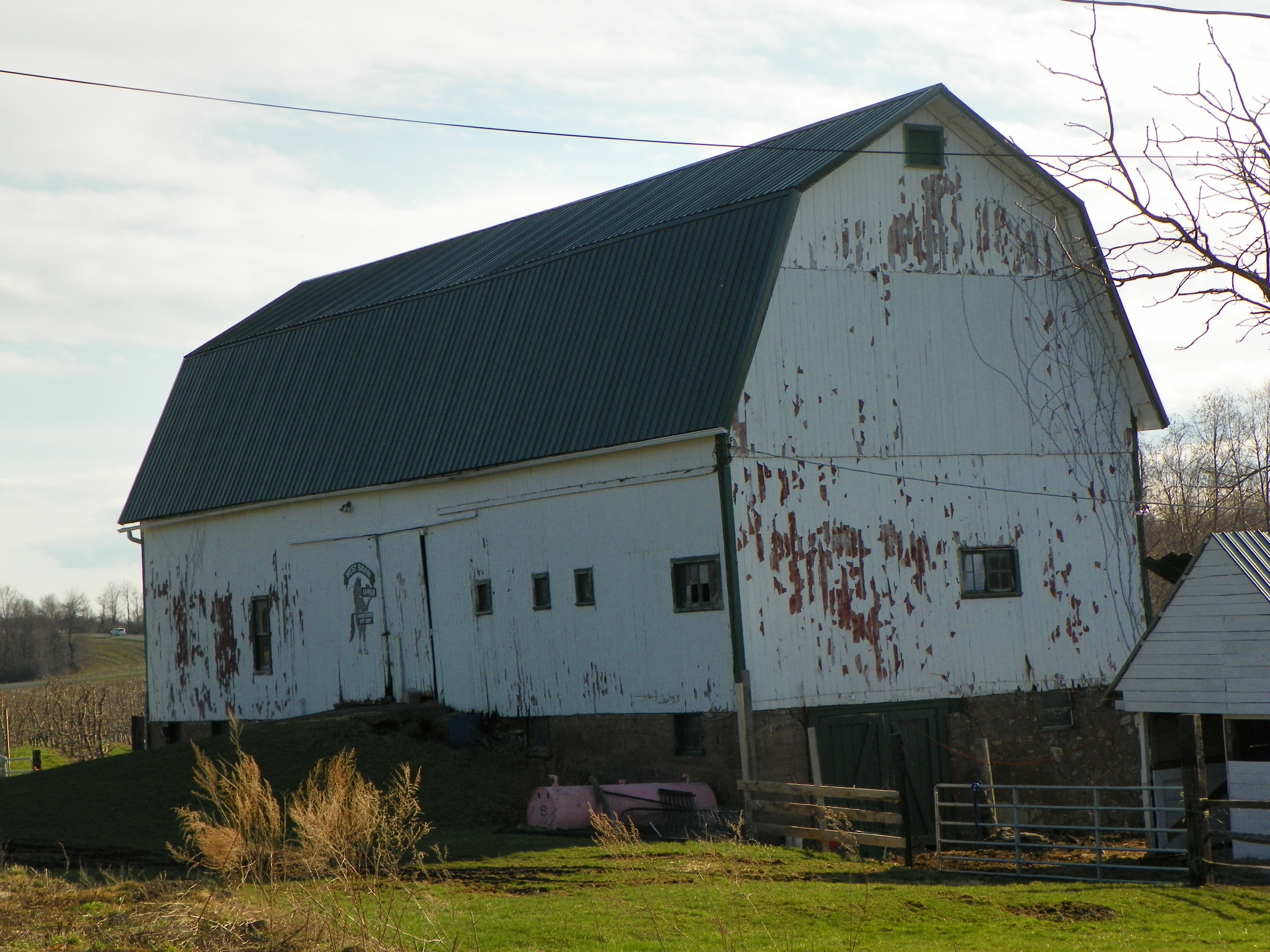
Barn on west side of road
