= Sodus Bay =

Bay of Lake Ontario in New York, USA

- Assorodus (Onondaga)
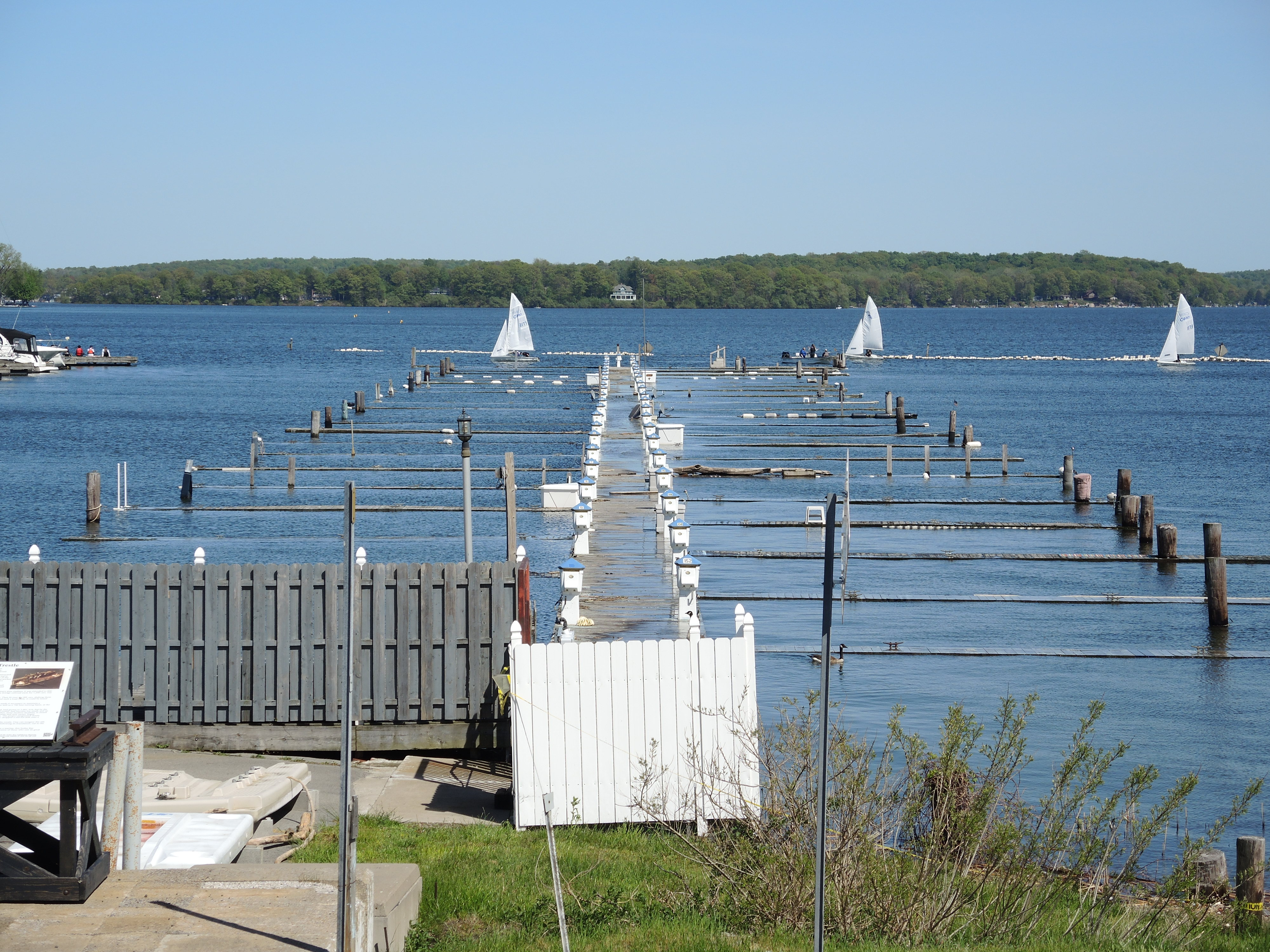
- Flooded marina on the bay

- Location within New York
- Coordinates: 43.257°N 76.967°W
- Type: Bay
- Etymology: Seneca for "silvery water"
- Primary inflows: First Creek, Second Creek, Third Creek, Sodus Creek West, Sodus Creek East (Glenmark Creek), Clark Creek
- Primary outflows: Lake Ontario
- Managing agency: New York State Department of Environmental Conservation
- Max. length: 3 miles (4.8 km)
- Max. width: 2 miles (3.2 km)
- Surface area: 3,357 acres (1,359 ha)
- Average depth: 18 feet (5.5 m)
- Max. depth: 48 feet (15 m)
- Surface elevation: 247 feet (75 m)
- Islands: Eagle, Leroy, and Newark
- Settlements: Huron, Sodus, Sodus Point

Sodus Bay is a bay on the south shore of Lake Ontario, one of the Great Lakes. Sodus Bay is located in Wayne County, New York, United States. Most of the bay is in the Town of Huron; however, the western part is in the Town of Sodus.

Sodus Bay has sometimes been referred to as "Great Sodus Bay" to distinguish it from "Little Sodus Bay," which is east of Sodus Bay in the Town of Sterling. Sodus Bay is halfway between Rochester and Syracuse.

Sodus Bay is one of Lake Ontario's major embayments separated from the lake by a 7,500-foot-long barrier beach. The bay is located in Wayne County, New York, and is 4.4 miles in length and 2.4 miles across. This major point of access to Lake Ontario contains 12 marinas, 13 waterfront restaurants, 2 public access sites, a public beach, and a sailing school. The Sodus Bay watershed is composed of land that is 30% agriculture, 4% developed land, 61% forest, and 4% wetlands. First Creek, Second Creek, Third Creek, Sodus Creek West, Sodus Creek East (Glenmark Creek), and Clark Creek empty into this bay.

The Towns of Huron, Sodus, Rose, Galen, Lyons and the Village of Sodus Point are located within the approximately 46-square mile watershed that drains to the Sodus Bay. Wayne County's shoreline embayments are of ecological importance containing over 6,807 acres of protected wetlands and host to over 36 species of aquatic plants, including three species of protected aquatic plants (e.g., American Lotus) and the protected softshell turtle.

Chimney Bluffs State Park is located in the northeast part of the bay.

Webster, New York–based Sea Scout Ship 303 operates the schooner S.S.S. Lotus out of Sodus Bay.

== History ==
The bay was called "Assorodus" ("Silvery Waters") by indigenous Onondaga people. Around 1794, Europeans began to settle in what's today Sodus Point. During the War of 1812 the community was mostly burned during an attack by the British.

A community of Shakers lived near here until about 1836, when they felt the development of the area was becoming too worldly.

A lighthouse was erected on the western point of the bay in 1870, replacing an earlier lighthouse constructed in 1824.

The bay was considered an important port. A rail line extending into Pennsylvania allowed coal to be place on board lake shipping.

== Geography ==
Eagle, Leroy, and Newark Islands are in Sodus Bay and the only islands in south central end of Lake Ontario.
