= Sodus (village), New York =

Sodus, New York
- Village
- Location in Wayne County and the state of New York.

- Location within the state of New York
- Coordinates: 43°14′16″N 77°03′43″W
- Country: United States
- State: New York
- County: Wayne
- Town: Sodus
- Settled: 1809
- Incorporated: December 30, 1917
- Named for: "Assorodus," the Cayuga language word for "silvery water"

Government
  - Type: Board of Trustees
  - Mayor: Daniel Ingersoll
  - Clerk: Karen Cline

Area
  - Total: 0.94 sq mi (2.44 km^{2})
  - Land: 0.94 sq mi (2.44 km^{2})
  - Water: 0 sq mi (0.00 km^{2})
- Elevation: 436 ft (133 m)

Population (2020)
  - Total: 1,667
  - Density: 1,771.6/sq mi (684.03/km^{2})
- Time zone: UTC-5 (EST)
  - Summer (DST): UTC-4 (EDT)
- ZIP Code(s): 14551
- Area codes: 315 and 680
- FIPS code: 36-68209
- GNIS feature ID: 0965619
- Website: https://villageofsodusny.gov/

Sodus is a village in Wayne County, New York, United States. The population was 1,667 at the 2020 census.

The Village of Sodus is near the center of the Town of Sodus and lies between Rochester and Syracuse. The village contains the government center for the Town of Sodus.

== History ==
The village area was part of the Iroquois Confederacy's territory. Specifically, this was territory of the Onondaga nation for many years. They camped at lake edge, where they could fish. They hunted in the interior woods. After the American Revolution, in which the Onondagas and most Iroquois tribes had allied with Great Britain, they were forced to cede their lands to New York as part of the peace settlement (Treaty of Fort Stanwix). Migrating with Loyalists after Britain's defeat, the tribes relocated to Upper Canada across Lake Ontario, where the British government made some allotments for their reservations.

The first European-American settler arrived at what became Sodus in 1809, as part of the great postwar migration of settlers from New England into western New York. The village was incorporated in 1917.

== Geography ==
According to the United States Census Bureau, the village has a total area of 0.9 square mile (2.4 km^{2}), all land.

The village is on New York State Route 104, which passes around the north part of the village and is at the northern end of New York State Route 88. County Roads 134 (Maple Avenue) and 143 (West Main Street/State Street) also lead into the village.

Sodus is south of the Lake Ontario shore and southwest of Sodus Bay.

== Demographics ==
Historical population
Census	Pop.	Note	%±
1870	516		—
1880	842		63.2%
1890	1,028		22.1%
1920	1,329		—
1930	1,444		8.7%
1940	1,513		4.8%
1950	1,588		5.0%
1960	1,645		3.6%
1970	1,813		10.2%
1980	1,790		−1.3%
1990	1,904		6.4%
2000	1,735		−8.9%
2010	1,819		4.8%
2020	1,667		−8.4%
U.S. Decennial Census

As of the census of 2010, there were 1,819 people, 710 households, and 446 families residing in the village. The population density was 2,021.1 inhabitants per square mile (780.4/km^{2}). The racial makeup of the village was 75.3% White, 15.7% Black or African American, 0.7% Native American, 0.6% Asian, 0.0% Pacific Islander, 3.1% from other races, and 4.6% from two or more races. Hispanic or Latino of any race were 8.4% of the population.

There were 710 households, out of which 29.3% had children under the age of 18 living with them, 40.0% were married couples living together, 16.5% had a female householder with no husband present, and 37.2% were non-families. 31.8% of all households were made up of individuals, and 13.1% had someone living alone who was 65 years of age or older. The average household size was 2.55 and the average family size was 3.17.

In the village, the population was spread out, with 30.7% under the age of 20, 5.9% from 20 to 24, 23.8% from 25 to 44, 27.3% from 45 to 64, and 12.1% who were 65 years of age or older. The median age was 36.6 years. For every 100 females, there were 89.5 males. For every 100 females age 18 and over, there were 93.7 males.

The median income for a household in the village was $45,655, and the median income for a family was $50,571. Males had a median income of $41,979 versus $30,179 for females. The per capita income for the village was $19,511. About 13.9% of families and 16.7% of the population were below the poverty line, including 17.7% of those under age 18 and 19.5% of those age 65 or over.

=== Housing ===
There were 792 housing units at an average density of 880.0 per square mile (339.8/km^{2}); a total of 10.4% of housing units were vacant.

There were 710 occupied housing units in the village, of which 416 were owner-occupied units (58.6%), while 294 were renter-occupied (41.4%). The homeowner vacancy rate was 2.3% of total units. The rental unit vacancy rate was 10.3%.

== School system ==
The Sodus Central School District comprises two buildings. The Sodus Central Elementary School contains students in grades K-5. The other building has students of the Middle and High Schools, containing grades 6-8 and 9-12, respectively.
