= South Butler, New York =

Hamlet in New York, United States

Coordinates: 43°07′53″N 76°45′57″W

South Butler is a hamlet in the Town of Butler, Wayne County, New York, United States near the Savannah town line. It is located seven miles (11 km) south-southeast of the Village of Wolcott and five miles (8 km) north of the hamlet of Savannah, at an elevation of 400 feet (122 m). The primary cross roads where the hamlet is located are N.Y. Route 89, South Butler Road (CR 271) and South Butler-Conquest Road (CR 275).

A United States Post Office is located in South Butler with a ZIP Code of 13154.

== History ==
The hamlet was formerly known as Harringtons Corners. In 1853 at South Butler, Antoinette Brown Blackwell was the first female minister to be ordained in the United States.

== Attractions ==
South Butler is home to South Butler Nostalgia Dragway, an independently owned 1/10-mile (0.16 km) 'no-prep' dragstrip. Originally known as Warrick (or Jackson's) Dragway and later King's Dragway, it first opened in 1958 and hosted various categories of drag racing. The track closed in 1977, but was recently revived and now provides old school style drag racing with no use of nitrous allowed. South Butler Nostalgia Dragway currently operates four events per year, on the last Sunday of each month from June through September.
