= Savannah, New York =

- Town
- Location in Wayne County and the state of New York

- Location within the state of New York
- Coordinates: 43°4′30″N 76°45′36″W
- Country: United States
- State: New York
- County: Wayne
- Settled: 1808
- Established: February 28, 1825

Government
  - Type: Town Board
  - Supervisor: Michael Kolczynski
  - Clerk: Julie Carey
  - Court: Justice Richard R. Sloan; Justice Heath E. TenEyck

Area
  - Total: 36.18 sq mi (93.70 km^{2})
  - Land: 35.97 sq mi (93.16 km^{2})
  - Water: 0.21 sq mi (0.55 km^{2})
- Elevation: 390 ft (120 m)

Population (2010)
  - Total: 1,730
  - Estimate (2016): 1,671
  - Density: 46.5/sq mi (17.94/km^{2})
- Time zone: UTC-5 (Eastern (EST))
  - Summer (DST): UTC-4 (EDT)
- ZIP code: 13146
- Area codes: 315 and 680
- FIPS code: 36-65343
- GNIS feature ID: 0979465
- Website: https://savannahny.us/

Savannah is a town in the southeast portion of Wayne County, New York, United States. The population was 1,730 at the 2010 census.

The town has a hamlet (and census-designated place), also called Savannah. Government offices for the town are located there.

== History ==
Fort Hill, located on the highest land in the town, is a historic native village and was the site of a Jesuit mission in the 17th century, built by the remains of an earlier, "Owasco", village. Like other nearby towns, Savannah was part of the Central New York Military Tract. Settlers arrived in more modern times around 1808, but Savannah is considered to be the last town in the county that was settled.

The Town of Savannah was created from the Town of Galen on February 28, 1825.

Wiley Schoolhouse (built 1874) is a fully restored historic one-room school for the former District #11 located at the intersection of Wiley (CR 374), Hogback and Olmstead roads in the southwest part of town. The Crusoe House (built 1824), located on N.Y. Route 89 near Crusoe Lake, is currently the oldest building in the Town of Savannah. Originally a hotel and tavern, the first-ever town meeting was held there in April 1825. It also served as the first post office.

== Geography ==
According to the United States Census Bureau, the town has a total area of 36.2 square miles (94 km^{2}), of which 36.0 square miles (93 km^{2}) is land and 0.2 square miles (0.52 km^{2}) (0.53%) is water.

The eastern town line is the border of Cayuga County, and the southern boundary is the border of Seneca County. Savannah is west of Syracuse.

New York State Route 31, an east–west highway, is partly conjoined with New York State Route 89, a north–south highway in the town.

This swamp-ridden area north of Cayuga Lake has several conservation areas, including Montezuma National Wildlife Refuge, located within the southern portion of the town. The Montezuma Audubon Center, located on N.Y. Route 89 near Crusoe Lake, is a state-owned nature education facility and preserve operated under cooperative agreement between the New York State Department of Environmental Conservation and the National Audubon Society.

== Demographics ==
Historical population
Census	Pop.	Note	%±
1830	886		—
1840	1,718		93.9%
1850	1,700		−1.0%
1860	1,910		12.4%
1870	1,933		1.2%
1880	1,867		−3.4%
1890	1,788		−4.2%
1900	1,733		−3.1%
1910	1,586		−8.5%
1920	1,524		−3.9%
1930	1,485		−2.6%
1940	1,456		−2.0%
1950	1,494		2.6%
1960	1,667		11.6%
1970	1,676		0.5%
1980	1,905		13.7%
1990	1,768		−7.2%
2000	1,838		4.0%
2010	1,730		−5.9%
2016 (est.)	1,671	▼	−3.4%
U.S. Decennial Census

As of the census of 2010, there were 1,730 people, 630 households, and 430 families residing in the town. The population density was 48.1 inhabitants per square mile (18.6/km^{2}). The racial makeup of the town was 95.4% White, 1.6% Black or African American, 0.2% Native American, 0.3% Asian, 0.0% Pacific Islander, 0.6% from other races, and 1.9% from two or more races. Hispanic or Latino of any race were 4.4% of the population.

There were 630 households, out of which 27.1% had children under the age of 18 living with them, 52.4% were married couples living together, 10.0% had a female householder with no husband present, and 31.7% were non-families. 24.8% of all households were made up of individuals, and 11.4% had someone living alone who was 65 years of age or older. The average household size was 2.73 and the average family size was 3.20.

In the town, the population was spread out, with 28.4% under the age of 20, 4.5% from 20 to 24, 23.9% from 25 to 44, 28.2% from 45 to 64, and 14.9% who were 65 years of age or older. The median age was 39.7 years. For every 100 females, there were 99.1 males. For every 100 females age 18 and over, there were 102.4 males.

The median income for a household in the town was $41,176, and the median income for a family was $47,500. Males had a median income of $39,191 versus $30,833 for females. The per capita income for the town was $20,629. About 9.1% of families and 17.9% of the population were below the poverty line, including 33.4% of those under age 18 and 14.5% of those age 65 or over.

=== Housing ===
There were 695 housing units at an average density of 19.3 per square mile (7.5/km^{2}); a total of 9.4% of housing units were vacant.

There were 630 occupied housing units in the town, of which 512 were owner-occupied units (81.3%), while 118 were renter-occupied (18.7%). The homeowner vacancy rate was 1.0% of total units. The rental unit vacancy rate was 9.9%.

== Communities and locations in Savannah ==
- Crusoe – A location on the south town line west of Evans Corner
- Crusoe Lake – A lake located north of Savannah hamlet
- Evans Corner – A hamlet on the south town line on NY-89
- Fort Hill – A hamlet south of Savannah hamlet. It is the highest point in the town.
- Mays Point – A historic location in the south part of the town
- Pangburn Corners – A location at the north town line on County Road 272
- Montezuma Marsh – An important swamp in the southwest part of the town
- Noble Corner – A hamlet on the west town line
- Northern Montezuma Wildlife Management Area – Conservation areas in the center of the town.
- Savannah – A hamlet at the junction of NY-31 and NY-89. The community was formerly an incorporated village (1867), but later abandoned that status in 1979.
- Tamarack Swamp – A swamp north of Crusoe Lake
