= Butler Center, New York =

Hamlet in New York, United States

Coordinates: 43°10′07″N 76°46′17″W

Butler Center is a hamlet in the Town of Butler, Wayne County, New York, United States. It is located five miles (8 km) southeast of the Village of Wolcott, at an elevation of 400 feet (122 m). The primary cross roads where the hamlet is located are Butler Center Road (CR 264), Pond Road and Crane Road. Government offices for the Town of Butler are located in the hamlet.

The Methodist Episcopal Church of Butler was listed on the National Register of Historic Places in 1997.
