= New York State Route 89 =

State highway in central New York, US

New York State Route 89
- Map of central New York with NY 89 highlighted in red

Route information
- Maintained by NYSDOT and the city of Ithaca
- Length: 62.35 mi (100.34 km)
- Existed: 1930–present

Major junctions
- South end: NY 13 / NY 34 / NY 96 in Ithaca
- US 20 / NY 5 in Seneca Falls
- North end: NY 104 near Wolcott village

Location
- Country: United States
- State: New York
- Counties: Tompkins, Seneca, Wayne

Highway system
- New York Highways; Interstate; US; State; Reference; Parkways
← NY 88	→ NY 89A

New York State Route 89 (NY 89) is a north–south state highway in central New York in the United States. It extends for 62.35 miles (100.34 km) from an intersection with NY 13, NY 34, and NY 96 in the Tompkins County city of Ithaca to an interchange with NY 104 in the Wayne County town of Wolcott. The route spans a total of three counties, connecting the heart of the Finger Lakes Region to a point 6 miles (10 km) south of Lake Ontario. Along the way, NY 89 intersects two regionally important highways: the conjoined routes of U.S. Route 20 (US 20) and NY 5 in Seneca Falls and NY 31 in Savannah. NY 89 runs along the western edge of Cayuga Lake from Ithaca to Seneca Falls.

NY 89 was assigned as part of the 1930 renumbering of state highways in New York to a significantly different alignment than it follows today. At the time, the route began in Varick and passed through Seneca Falls and Clyde before ending near North Rose. It was extended south to Ithaca c. 1933 and rerouted north of Seneca Falls on April 30, 1959 to serve Savannah and Wolcott instead. The latter change supplanted part of NY 414, which was subsequently moved onto NY 89's original routing from Seneca Falls to North Rose. NY 89 originally extended into the village of Wolcott; however, it was cut back to its current northern terminus after the NY 104 super two was constructed in the early 1970s.

== Route description ==
Maintenance of NY 89 is split between the New York State Department of Transportation (NYSDOT) and the city of Ithaca. Most of NY 89 is state-maintained; however, it is locally maintained in Ithaca from the Cayuga Lake inlet crossing to the northern city line. The portion of NY 89 along the west shore of Cayuga Lake from Ithaca to the intersection with US 20 and NY 5 near the Montezuma National Wildlife Refuge is part of the Cayuga Lake Scenic Byway, a loop route passing through Ithaca, Seneca Falls, and Union Springs.

=== Tompkins County ===
NY 89 begins at the intersection of North Meadow and West Buffalo Streets (the former carrying northbound NY 13 and NY 34) in the West End of the city of Ithaca. Here, NY 96 exits North Meadow Street and overlaps NY 89 westward along Buffalo Street. The two routes intersect North Fulton Street (NY 13 and NY 34 southbound) and cross over a branch of the Cayuga Lake inlet before separating at Taughannock Boulevard. While NY 96 continues west on Buffalo Street, NY 89 heads north on Taughannock Boulevard, crossing over the inlet and running along the western shore of Cayuga Lake as it exits the city and enters the town of the same name.

Outside of Ithaca, NY 89 heads generally northwestward along the western side of a valley surrounding Cayuga Lake. Due to the steep terrain of the surrounding area, this portion of the route passes through sparsely populated and mostly forested areas. In Ulysses, the northernmost town that NY 89 passes through in Tompkins County, the highway serves Taughannock Falls State Park, a mostly linear park that follows Taughannock Creek west to the village of Trumansburg. NY 89 crosses the northernmost portion of the park on its way into Seneca County.

=== Seneca County ===
In Seneca County, NY 89 remains relatively isolated in relation to other state routes, even though it leaves the lake valley at the southern county line for an alignment that takes it along the western lip of the gully. For its first 11 miles (18 km) in the county, NY 89 closely parallels NY 96, the latter of which is located on slightly higher ground a short distance to the west. While NY 96 serves several hamlets and the village of Interlaken, NY 89 heads across largely unpopulated areas of the towns of Covert and Ovid and traverses little more than farmland. The routes diverge at the Romulus town line, where NY 96 turns west toward the village of Ovid.

NY 89, meanwhile, continues northward into Romulus, where it gradually moves closer to the western lake shore as it descends back into the lake valley. It reaches the shoreline near the hamlet of Elm Beach, from where the route continues along Cayuga Lake for 7 miles (11 km) into the town of Varick. Along the way, NY 89 serves dozens of lakeside homes and several small communities, including East Varick. The 7-mile stretch ends at the Fayette town line, where the route leaves the lake to take a slightly more inland routing through the town. As a result, the lakeside homes give way to farmland once again, and the rolling terrain follows NY 89 northward into the town of Seneca Falls.

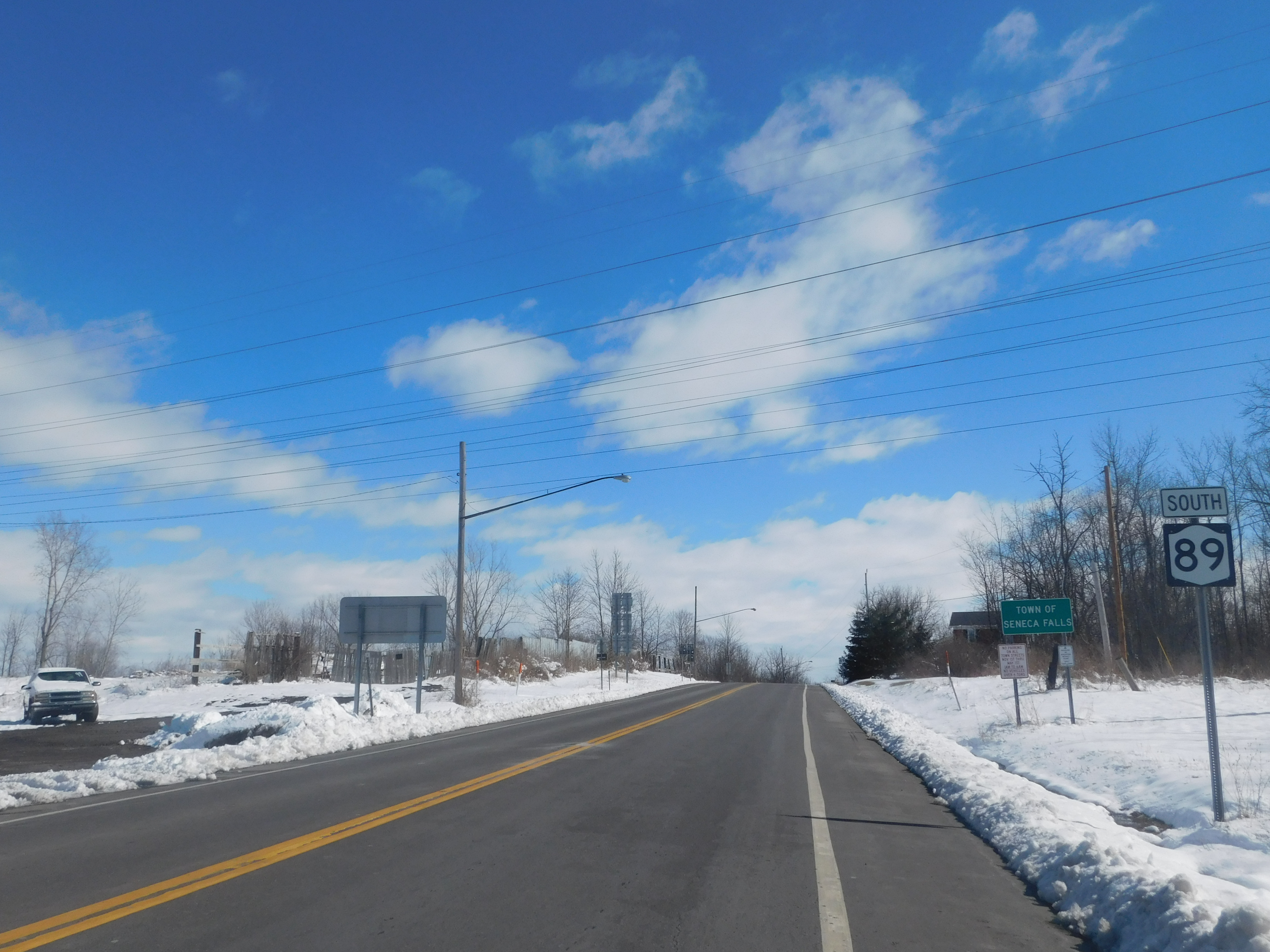
NY 89 southbound from US 20/NY 5 at the Montezuma National Wildlife Refuge

The route proceeds generally northward through Seneca Falls, serving Cayuga Lake State Park and the small hamlet of Bridgeport prior to crossing over the Cayuga–Seneca Canal (part of the Seneca River) near the northern tip of Cayuga Lake. Past the canal, NY 89 begins to run along the west side of the Montezuma Marsh, the main component of the Montezuma National Wildlife Refuge. Not far from the canal is an intersection with US 20 and NY 5, which connect NY 89 to the nearby hamlet of Seneca Falls. NY 318 ends at US 20 and NY 5 just 0.1 miles (0.16 km) west of this junction. NY 89 continues on, in the town of Tyre, passing over the New York State Thruway and traversing part of the refuge before crossing the Erie Canal and entering Wayne County.

=== Wayne County ===
Just inside the Wayne County limits, NY 89 leaves its northern alignment and turns east onto Armitage Road, which runs along the Seneca–Wayne county line. Just over 1 mile (1.6 km) to the east, NY 89 intersects NY 31 at a commercialized intersection in an otherwise rural area of the town of Savannah. While NY 31 eastbound travels southeast into Seneca County and the nearby Montezuma Marsh, NY 31 westbound joins NY 89 northbound through Savannah. The routes initially pass by farmland; however, the open fields gradually give way to homes and businesses as the road approaches the hamlet of Savannah.

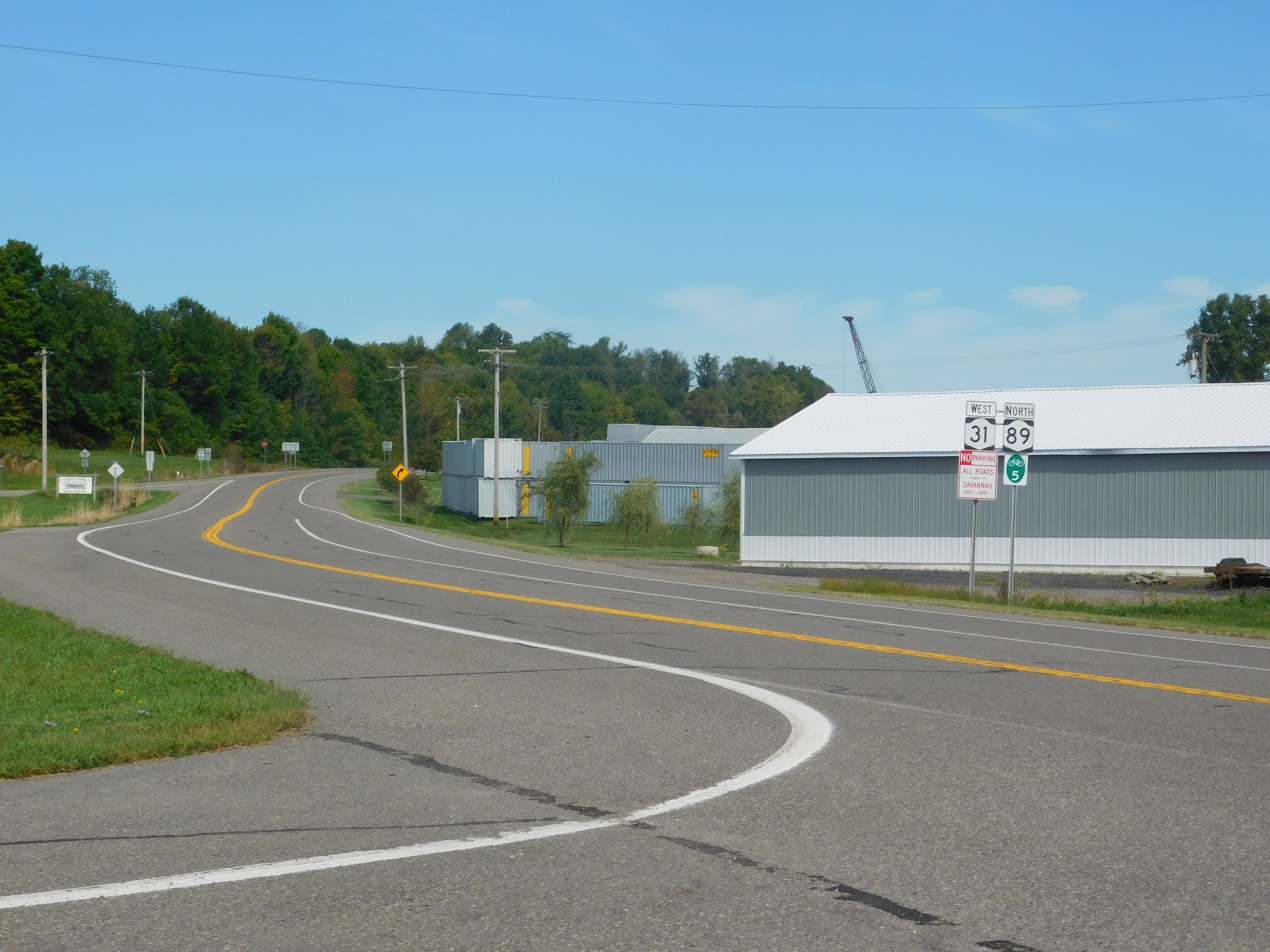
NY 31 and NY 89 westbound through Savannah

NY 31 and NY 89 enter Savannah on High Street, which carries both routes northeastward over the CSX Transportation-owned Rochester Subdivision. North of the overpass, the routes pass by two blocks of homes before turning west onto East Church Street. The overlap ends one block later in Savannah's central business district, where NY 89 splits from NY 31 to follow North Main Street out of the hamlet. The open fields return 0.5 miles (0.8 km) from the hamlet's center, and NY 89 heads north across a mixture of open fields and marshland for roughly 10 miles (16 km) to the towns of Butler and Wolcott. Here, the route ends just south of the village of Wolcott at a partial diamond interchange with NY 104. The junction provides access to NY 104 westbound and from NY 104 eastbound; the other connections are made by way of Countryman Road, an east–west highway located just north of the interchange.

== History ==
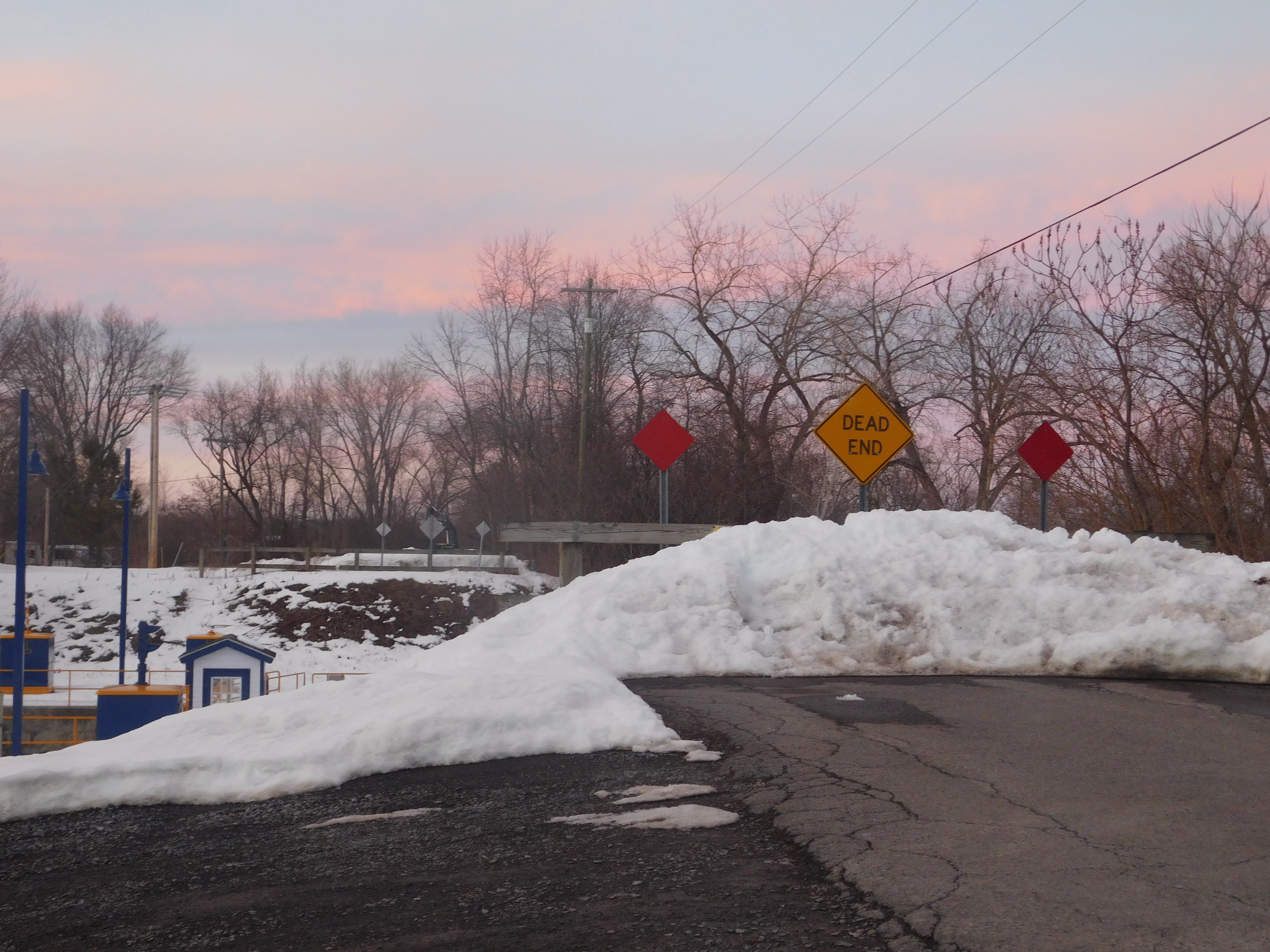
The former alignment of NY 414 and later NY 89 at Lock 25 in Mays Point

NY 89 was assigned as part of the 1930 renumbering of state highways in New York. It initially began at the junction of NY 44 (modern NY 414) and Ernsberger Road in the town of Varick and followed the latter eastward to Cayuga Lake, where NY 89 turned north onto its modern alignment. At Seneca Falls, the route broke from its current routing and proceeded westward on what is now NY 318 to Magee. Here, NY 89 turned back to the north, following modern NY 414 and Lake Bluff Road to Ridge Road (then-US 104) north of North Rose. At the time, the current routing of NY 89 north of Seneca Falls and the continuation of NY 89 along Auburn Street to Ridge Road in Wolcott was part of NY 44 while the section from Ithaca to Varick had yet to be constructed.

The lakeside highway was completed from Varick to Ovid c. 1932. Around the same time, construction began on the segment from Ithaca to Taughannock Falls State Park near Trumansburg. The Varick–Ovid portion became part of an extended NY 89, which connected to then-NY 15 (now NY 96) at its south end via Blew, Potter, and Footes Corners Roads. The segment south of Trumansburg was initially designated as NY 325; it became part of NY 89 when the remainder of the lakeside highway south of Ovid was completed c. 1933.

US 44 was assigned in the Hudson Valley c. 1935; as a result, NY 44 was renumbered to NY 414 to eliminate numerical duplication with the new U.S. Highway. Both NY 89 and NY 414 went unchanged until April 30, 1959 when the alignments of both routes north of Seneca Falls were swapped, placing NY 89 on its current alignment from Seneca Falls to Wolcott. NY 89 was truncated southward to its current northern terminus in the early 1970s following the construction of the US 104 super two highway south of Wolcott. The former routing of NY 89 along Auburn Street is now maintained by the village.

== NY 89A ==
New York State Route 89A
- Location: Seneca Falls town
- Existed: early 1950s–late 1950s

NY 89A was a spur route of NY 89 in the town of Seneca Falls. It began at an intersection with US 20 and NY 5 west of the village of Seneca Falls and went north to the hamlet of Magee, where it ended at a junction with NY 89. NY 89A was assigned in the early 1950s and replaced by a realigned NY 414 in the late 1950s.

== Major intersections ==
County	Location	mi	km	Destinations	Notes
Tompkins	Ithaca	0.00	0.00	NY 13 / NY 34 north / NY 96 south	Eastern terminus of NY 89 / NY 96 overlap
Tompkins	Ithaca	0.10	0.16	NY 13 / NY 34 south	
Tompkins	Ithaca	0.20	0.32	NY 96 north	Western terminus of NY 89 / NY 96 overlap
Seneca	Seneca Falls–Tyre town line	41.60	66.95	NY 5 / US 20 / NY 318 to New York Thruway – Seneca Falls, Auburn, Women's Rights National Historical Park	Hamlet of Halsey Corners
Seneca–Wayne county line	Tyre–Savannah town line	48.30	77.73	NY 31 east – Port Byron, Syracuse	Southern terminus of NY 31 / NY 89 overlap
Wayne	Town of Savannah	51.53	82.93	NY 31 west	Northern terminus of NY 31 / NY 89 overlap; hamlet of Savannah
Wayne	Butler	62.35	100.34	NY 104 west – Rochester	Half-diamond interchange
1.000 mi = 1.609 km; 1.000 km = 0.621 mi: Concurrency terminus
