= Mays Point, New York =

Hamlet in New York, United States

Coordinates: 42°59′51″N 76°45′55″W

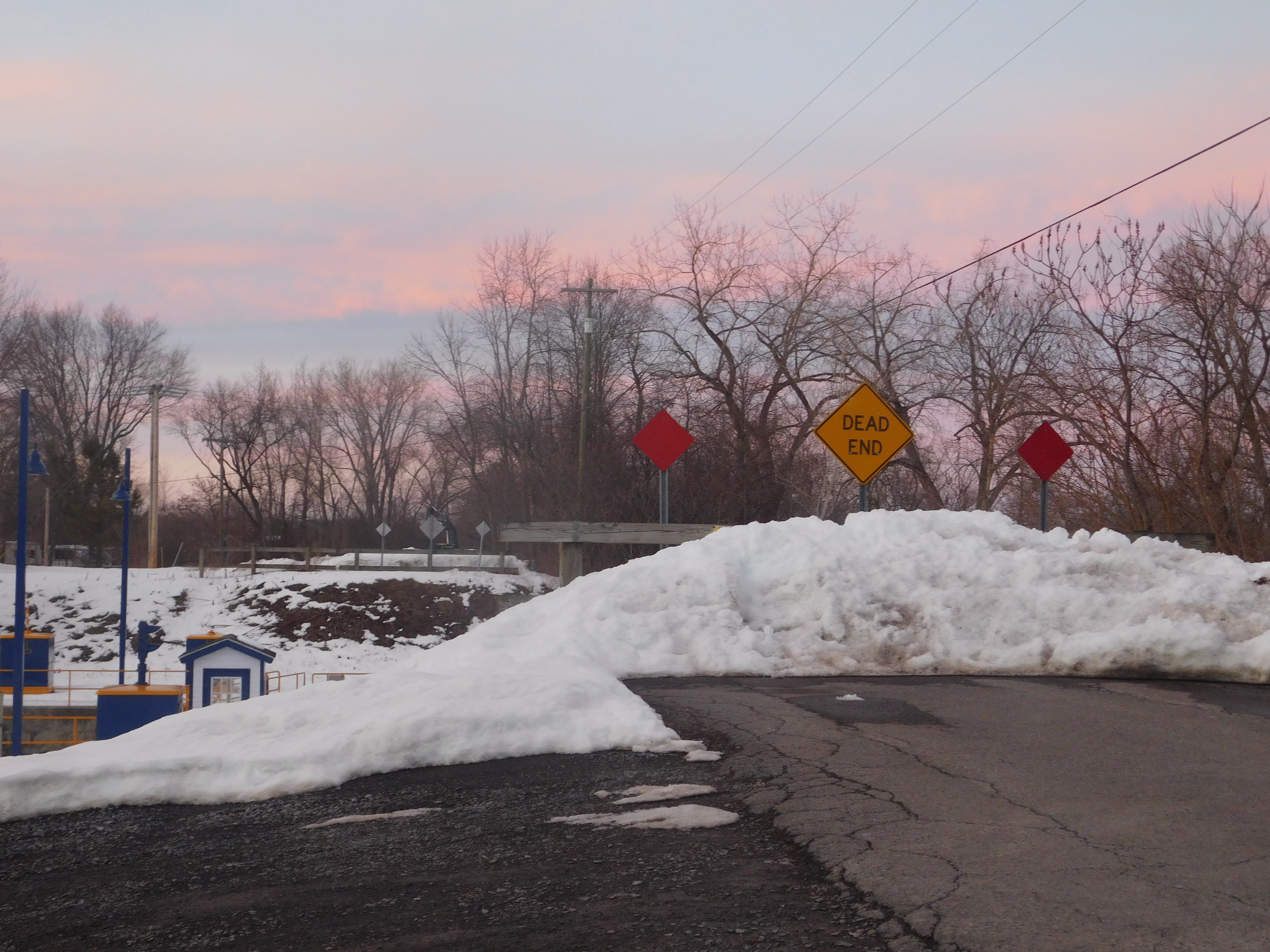
The former alignment of NY 89 and NY 414 in Mays Point

Mays Point is a hamlet in the Town of Tyre, Seneca County, New York, United States, near the Wayne and Cayuga county lines. It is located seven miles (11 km) northeast of the hamlet of Seneca Falls, at an elevation of 381 feet (116 m). The primary intersection in the hamlet is at N.Y. Route 89 and Mays Point Road (CR 105A). Mays Point is situated along the Erie Canal near the junction of the Seneca and Clyde rivers within the Montezuma Marsh. The New York State Thruway (Interstate 90) passes just south of the hamlet.

Erie Canal Lock 25 is located off Mays Point Road, near N.Y. Route 89. It was built around 1912, and has a lift of 6 feet (1.8 m) to the west.
