= Tyre (hamlet), New York =

Hamlet in New York, United States

Coordinates: 42°59′28″N 76°48′08″W

Tyre is a hamlet in the Town of Tyre, Seneca County, New York, United States.

== Location and names ==
It is located in the central section of the town, 6 miles (10 km) north of the hamlet of Seneca Falls, at an elevation of 410 feet (125 m). The primary cross roads where the hamlet is located are Gravel Road (CR 101), East Tyre Road, Lamb Road and West Tyre Road. The hamlet is also referred as "Tyre City."

== Features and activity ==
A historic structure known as the Tyre Band Hall, built in 1831 on what is now Gravel Road, was originally used as a Campbellite church but abandoned thirty years later. After being used as a grange hall, members of the Tyre Cornet Band eventually acquired the vacant building through squatter's rights in 1919. It was used for their rehearsals and concerts as well as a community center. A kitchen was added during that time for use during special events. The Tyre Band Hall also served as the Tyre Town Hall throughout the early to mid-1900s. In 1971, the Town of Tyre purchased the building and moved it beside the Tyre Highway Department on Lamb Road. Recent state grants and fundraisers allowed the building to be refurbished. The Tyre Town Board had held its monthly business meetings there during the summer and at the Tyre Highway Department during the winter before a new municipal building was built on NY Route 318 in 2016. The Tyre Band Hall continues to be used as a community center.
