= Butler, New York =

- Town
- Location in Wayne County and the state of New York.

- Location within New York
- Coordinates: 43°10′52″N 76°46′23″W
- Country: United States
- State: New York
- County: Wayne
- Settled: 1803
- Established: February 26, 1826

Government
  - Type: Town Board
  - Supervisor: David Spickerman, Sr.
  - Clerk: Kimberly Parmeter
  - Court: Justice Jeffrey Rich Harper; Justice Neil Fuller

Area
  - Total: 37.17 sq mi (96.27 km^{2})
  - Land: 37.09 sq mi (96.06 km^{2})
  - Water: 0.077 sq mi (0.20 km^{2})
- Elevation: 397 ft (121 m)

Population (2010)
  - Total: 2,064
  - Estimate (2016): 1,929
  - Density: 52.0/sq mi (20.08/km^{2})
- Time zone: UTC-5 (Eastern (EST))
  - Summer (DST): UTC-4 (EDT)
- Area codes: 315 and 680
- FIPS code: 36-11473
- GNIS feature ID: 0978769
- Website: https://www.townofbutlerny.com/

Butler is a town in Wayne County, New York, United States. The population was 2,064 at the 2010 census. It is also the town with the fewest Registered Voters in Wayne County with approximately 140 active voters.

The Town of Butler is on the east border of the county and is west of Syracuse, New York.

A post office is located in the Town of Butler although the area is covered by four postal districts. Only the immediate hamlet of South Butler uses a ZIP Code of 13154 for South Butler. Addresses in the northern section have a ZIP Code of 14590 for Wolcott and a ZIP Code of 13143 for Red Creek, while the southern section has a ZIP Code of 13146 for Savannah.

Government offices for the town are located in Butler Center.

== History ==
Settlement began in 1803.

The Town of Butler was formed from the Town of Wolcott in 1826.

Butler Correctional Facility was a New York State medium security prison. Butler Correctional Facility was located in the northeastern part of town near the hamlet of Westbury. It closed on July 26, 2014, under the Governor Andrew Cuomo's Administration.

The Roe Cobblestone Schoolhouse was listed on the National Register of Historic Places in 2008.

== Notable people ==
- Antoinette Brown Blackwell, first woman to be ordained as a minister in the United States
- Maria Purdy Peck (1840-1914), essayist, social economist, civic leader
- Samuel Ringgold Ward, African-American pastor and abolitionist, ordained a decade before Antoinette Blackwell

== Geography ==
According to the United States Census Bureau, the town has a total area of 37.2 square miles (96 km^{2}), of which 37.1 square miles (96 km^{2}) is land and 0.1 square miles (0.26 km^{2}) (0.16%) is water.

The eastern town line is the border of Cayuga County.

New York State Route 89 is an important north–south highway in the town, intersecting New York State Route 104 in the northwestern section of the town. The western terminus of New York State Route 370 is in the northeastern part of Butler.

== Demographics ==
Historical population
Census	Pop.	Note	%±
1830	1,764		—
1840	2,271		28.7%
1850	2,272		0.0%
1860	2,338		2.9%
1870	2,023		−13.5%
1880	2,161		6.8%
1890	1,836		−15.0%
1900	1,786		−2.7%
1910	1,610		−9.9%
1920	1,452		−9.8%
1930	1,384		−4.7%
1940	1,411		2.0%
1950	1,429		1.3%
1960	1,441		0.8%
1970	1,593		10.5%
1980	1,720		8.0%
1990	2,152		25.1%
2000	2,277		5.8%
2010	2,064		−9.4%
2016 (est.)	1,929		−6.5%
U.S. Decennial Census

As of the census of 2010, there were 2,064 people, 723 households, and 525 families residing in the town. The population density was 55.5 inhabitants per square mile (21.4/km^{2}). The racial makeup of the town was 92.5% White, 3.2% Black or African American, 0.2% Native American, 0.0% Pacific Islander, 2.4% from other races, and 1.5% from two or more races. Hispanic or Latino of any race were 4.4% of the population.

There were 723 households, out of which 31.1% had children under the age of 18 living with them, 56.4% were married couples living together, 9.0% had a female householder with no husband present, and 27.4% were non-families. 21.0% of all households were made up of individuals, and 9.1% had someone living alone who was 65 years of age or older. The average household size was 2.76 and the average family size was 3.16.

In the town, the population was spread out, with 29.2% under the age of 20, 4.7% from 20 to 24, 25.3% from 25 to 44, 27.7% from 45 to 64, and 13.3% who were 65 years of age or older. The median age was 38.1 years. For every 100 females, there were 108.9 males. For every 100 females age 18 and over, there were 109.9 males.

The median income for a household in the town was $42,643, and the median income for a family was $44,851. Males had a median income of $38,036 versus $25,000 for females. The per capita income for the town was $15,403. About 9.8% of families and 17.7% of the population were below the poverty line, including 21.2% of those under age 18 and 6.3% of those age 65 or over.

=== Housing ===
There were 785 housing units at an average density of 21.1 per square mile (8.1/km^{2}); a total of 7.9% of housing units were vacant.

There were 723 occupied housing units in the town, of which 579 were owner-occupied units (80.1%), while 144 were renter-occupied (19.9%). The homeowner vacancy rate was 1.9% of total units. The rental unit vacancy rate was 2.0%.

== Communities and locations in Butler ==
- Butler Center — a hamlet near the town center. The Methodist Episcopal Church of Butler was listed on the National Register of Historic Places in 1997.
- Mill Pond — a small lake east of Butler Center.
- South Butler (formerly "Harringtons Corner") — a hamlet near the south town line on NY-89. The village is the site in 1853 of the first ordination of a woman minister in the United States, Antoinette Brown.
- West Butler — a hamlet near the west town line on Route 259. It was sometimes called "Cider Hill".
- Westbury — a hamlet on the town line in the northeastern corner of the town on County Road 267.
- Wolcott Creek — an important stream in the town.
