= Tyre, New York =

- Town
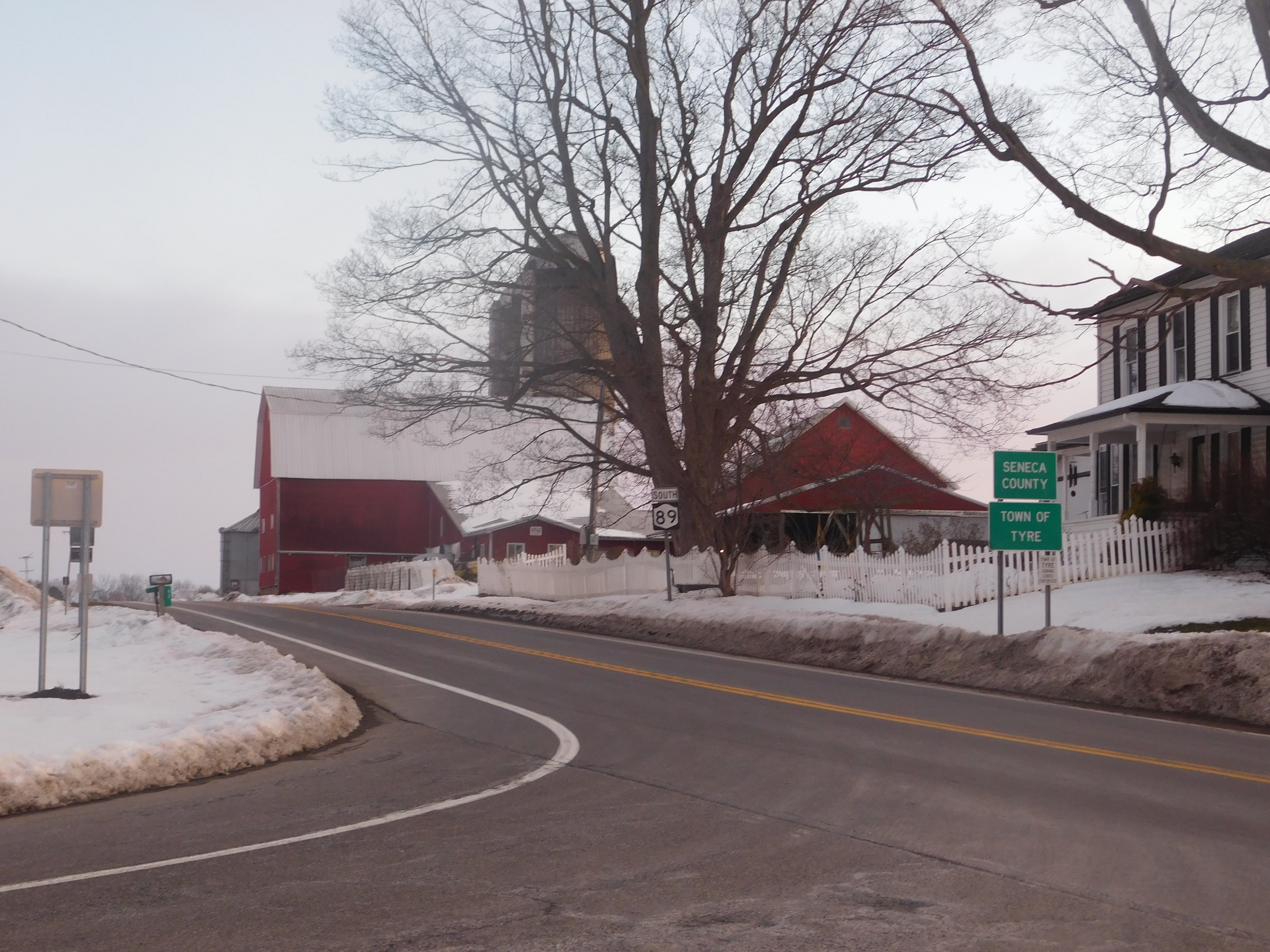
- New York State Route 89 southbound entering Tyre.

- Location within the state of New York
- Coordinates: 42°59′N 76°48′W
- Country: United States
- State: New York
- County: Seneca
- Settled: 1794
- Established: March 26, 1829

Government
  - Type: Town Board
  - Supervisor: Elizabeth L. Partee
  - Clerk: Carolyn Sosnowski
  - Court: Justice Gregory Guy; Justice Kathy Jans-Duffy

Area
  - Total: 33.11 sq mi (85.76 km^{2})
  - Land: 30.06 sq mi (77.85 km^{2})
  - Water: 3.06 sq mi (7.92 km^{2})
- Elevation: 433 ft (132 m)

Population (2020)
  - Total: 1,002 ▲
  - Estimate (2021): 999
  - Density: 32.2/sq mi (12.45/km^{2})
- Time zone: UTC-5 (Eastern (EST))
  - Summer (DST): UTC-4 (EDT)
- Area codes: 315 and 680
- FIPS code: 36-75902
- GNIS feature ID: 0979567
- Website: Official website

Tyre is a town in Seneca County, New York, United States. The population was 1,002 at the 2020 census. The town is named after the Lebanese city of Tyre.

The Town of Tyre is located in the northeastern part of the county, northeast of Geneva. It has a hamlet, also called Tyre. Government offices for the Town of Tyre are located in the new town hall on New York State Route 318 just west of the hamlet of Magee, New York.

There is no post office in the Town of Tyre. The primary postal district covering the area is ZIP Code 13148 for Seneca Falls. A small section of addresses west of N.Y. Route 414 to the town border have a ZIP Code of 13165 for Waterloo.

== History ==
The region was in the Central New York Military Tract, reserved for veterans, but a reservation was established at the northern end of Cayuga Lake for natives who returned to the area. A tract at the hamlet of Tyre was granted to Revolutionary War Colonel James Livingston. The first outside settler, Ezekiel Crane, arrived about 1794. Other early settlers were Asherr Halsey, Lewis Winans, Asa Smith and Caleb Woodworth. James Magee, a prominent physician for many years, came in 1811.

The town was created from the eastern part of the Town of Junius in 1829.

The town is part of the Erie Canalway National Heritage Corridor. Erie Canal Lock 25 is located off Mays Point Road (CR 105A) in the hamlet of Mays Point. It was built around 1912, and has a lift of 6 feet (1.83 m) to the west.

The Hiram Lay Cobblestone Farmhouse was listed on the National Register of Historic Places in 2009.

== Geography ==
According to the United States Census Bureau, the town has a total area of 33.1 square miles (86 km^{2}) of which 30.1 square miles (78 km^{2}) is land and 3.0 square miles (7.8 km^{2}) (8.97%) is water.

The northern town line is the border of Wayne County, and the eastern town line, partly marked by the Seneca River, is the border of Cayuga County.

A large eastern part of the town is in the Montezuma Marsh.

The Erie Canal and the Cayuga-Seneca Canal (Seneca River) pass through Tyre.

New York State Thruway (Interstate 90) crosses the town, passing through the Montezuma Marsh. New York State Route 89 and New York State Route 414 are north-south highways in the town, and New York State Route 318 is an east-west highway. New York State Route 31 crosses the northeastern corner of the town.

== Demographics ==
Historical population
Census	Pop.	Note	%±
1830	1,482		—
1840	1,506		1.6%
1850	1,356		−10.0%
1860	1,437		6.0%
1870	1,280		−10.9%
1880	1,168		−8.7%
1890	991		−15.2%
1900	954		−3.7%
1910	900		−5.7%
1920	798		−11.3%
1930	743		−6.9%
1940	724		−2.6%
1950	729		0.7%
1960	815		11.8%
1970	837		2.7%
1980	887		6.0%
1990	870		−1.9%
2000	899		3.3%
2010	981		9.1%
2020	1,002		2.1%
2021 (est.)	999		−0.3%
U.S. Decennial Census

At the 2010 census, there were 981 people, 356 households and 263 families residing in the town. The population density was 32.6 inhabitants per square mile (12.6/km^{2}). The racial makeup of the town was 97.6% White, 0.0% Black or African American, 0.2% Native American, 0.3% Asian, 0.0% Pacific Islander, 0.5% from other races, and 1.4% from two or more races. Hispanic or Latino of any race were 1.4% of the population.

There were 356 households, of which 29.5% had children under the age of 18 living with them, 56.7% were married couples living together, 8.7% had a female householder with no husband present, and 26.1% were non-families. 19.7% of all households were made up of individuals, and 8.2% had someone living alone who was 65 years of age or older. The average household size was 2.76 and the average family size was 3.14.

In the town, the population was spread out, with 29.5% under the age of 20, 5.6% from 20 to 24, 21.1% from 25 to 44, 30.3% from 45 to 64, and 13.3% who were 65 years of age or older. The median age was 40.0 years. For every 100 females, there were 101.9 males. For every 100 females age 18 and over, there were 101.1 males.

The median income for a household in the town was $43,750, and the median income for a family was $64,250. Males had a median income of $42,679 versus $31,125 for females. The per capita income for the town was $24,383. About 6.3% of families and 12.6% of the population were below the poverty line, including 16.1% of those under age 18 and 15.2% of those age 65 or over.

=== Housing ===
There were 419 housing units at an average density of 13.9 per square mile (5.4/km^{2}), of which 15.0% of housing units were vacant.

There were 356 occupied housing units in the town; 303 were owner-occupied units (85.1%), while 53 were renter-occupied (14.9%). The homeowner vacancy rate was 1.3% of total units. The rental unit vacancy rate was 3.6%.

== Communities and locations in the Town of Tyre ==
- Armitage Farm and Armitage Bridge – A farm next to the bridge.
- Black Brook – A stream flowing past Tyre village into Montezuma Marsh.
- Clyde River – A river entering the Montezuma Marsh near the northern town line.
- Evans Corner – A hamlet at the northern town boundary on NY-89.
- Magee – A location south of the Thruway at the intersection of NY-414 and NY-318.
- Malcom – A location on NY-414 near the northern town line.
- Mays Point – A hamlet on NY-89 north of the Thruway by the Erie Canal.
- Montezuma National Wildlife Refuge – A federal conservation area encompassing part of the Montezuma Marsh.
- Munsons Corner – A hamlet on the northern town line on County Road 101.
- Tyre – The hamlet of Tyre located in the northern part of town on County Road 101.

== Casino ==
The town is the site of a new casino called Del Lago Resort and Casino. It was one of three projects selected by the New York State Gaming Facility Location Board on December 17, 2014, for possible licensure by the New York State Gaming Commission. The casino opened to the public in 2017.
