= Westbury, Cayuga County, New York =

Hamlet in New York, United States

Coordinates: 43°12′53″N 76°42′39″W

Westbury is a hamlet on the border of the Town of Victory in Cayuga County and the Town of Butler in Wayne County, New York, United States. It is located four miles (6 km) south of the Village of Red Creek and six miles (10 km) east of the Village of Wolcott, at an elevation of 400 feet (122 m). The primary cross roads where the hamlet is located are Westbury Cut-off Road (CR 267), Westbury Road (CR 266, CR 268) and Victory Road (CR 108).

Butler Correctional Facility, a New York State medium security prison, was located just west of the hamlet. It closed on July 26, 2014.
