= Maria Purdy Peck =

American essayist, economist, and civic leader

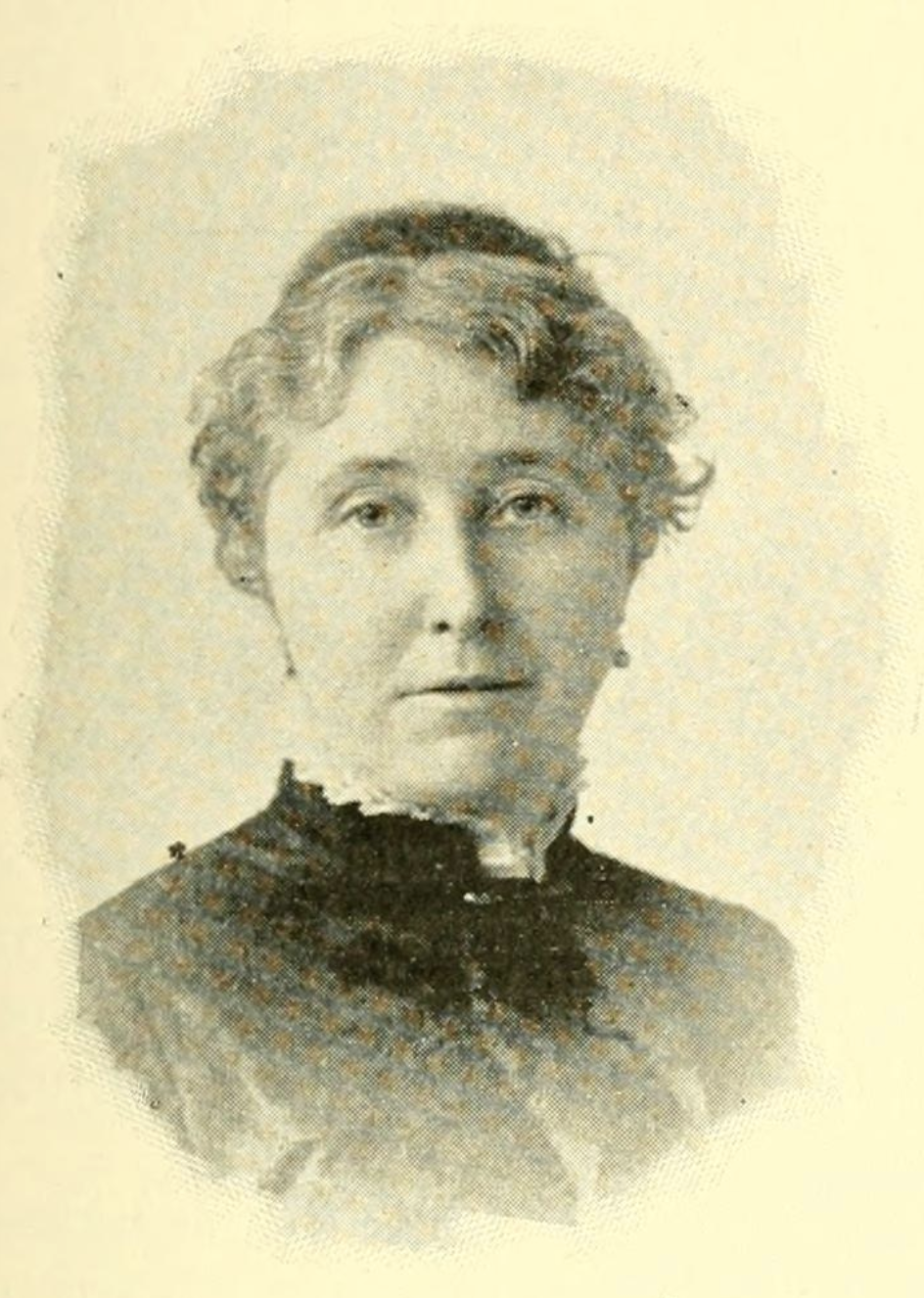
- Purdy in 1894
- Born: Maria Purdy; November 16, 1840; West Butler, New York, U.S.
- Died: January 2, 1913/14; Davenport, Iowa, U.S.
- Occupations: Essayist, social economist, civic leader
- Spouse: Washington Freeman Peck (m. 1865; died 1891)
- Children: 1
- Relatives: Stephen Hopkins

Maria Purdy Peck (née Purdy; 1840–1914) was American essayist, social economist, and civic leader from New York. Moving to Iowa after her marriage, she became involved with educational, philanthropic, and club work in the state.

== Early life and education ==
Maria Purdy was born on November 16, 1840, in West Butler, New York. Her father was Merritt Purdy, of Western New York, who was of Dutch origin. Both his father and mother belonged to the well known Dutch families of Albany, New York. Her mother was Amanda Sears Purdy. Both Merritt and Amanda came of Revolutionary ancestors. She was a direct descendant of Stephen Hopkins.

Peck's early education was under her father as tutor; afterward, she was educated in a New York seminary.

== Career ==
On September 18, 1865, she married Dr. Washington Freeman Peck, a physician of Iowa, and they moved immediately to Davenport.

Peck was characterized as of the ablest and most prominent women in Iowa of her era. She was well versed in general history and particularly in all that pertained to Iowa and the surrounding territory. She was a member of the Iowa State Historical Society. In 1874, she organized the Clionian Club, one of the oldest Iowa clubs and was its president for years. She was president of the Biennial Board of the Iowa Federation of Women's Clubs and served on many state committees, having been especially active on the child labor committee. She was one of the founders of St. Luke's Hospital and was the first president of its Board of Managers. She helped establish St. Luke's training school for nurses. Interested in library and literary work, she was one of the founders of the Davenport Public Library and served for years as president of the library board. For the first ten years of its existence, she served as president of the Clionian Club, one of Davenport's oldest and most exclusive literary organizations. She gave liberal support in money and influence to the maintenance of the Mission Kindergarten. Organizer of the Davenport Woman's Club and its first president, the motto was the thought and inspiration of Peck: "Where there is no vision, the people perish."

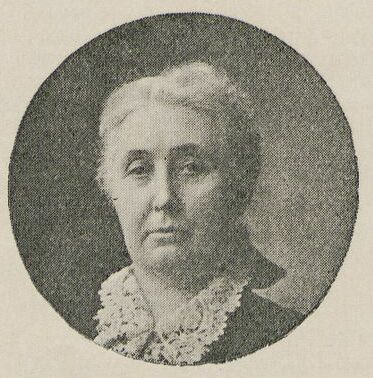
Photo in International Congress of Women, 1899

She was vice-president-at-large of the International Council of Women and was a prominent member of the International Congress of Women held in London in 1899. She read a paper before this council, which was the largest organized body of women in the world. At this conference, she was invited to a seat on the platform by Lady Henry Somerset, and she had the honor of being the guest of Queen Victoria at a garden party. Peck served in the same capacity at the organization's convening in Montreal in 1909.

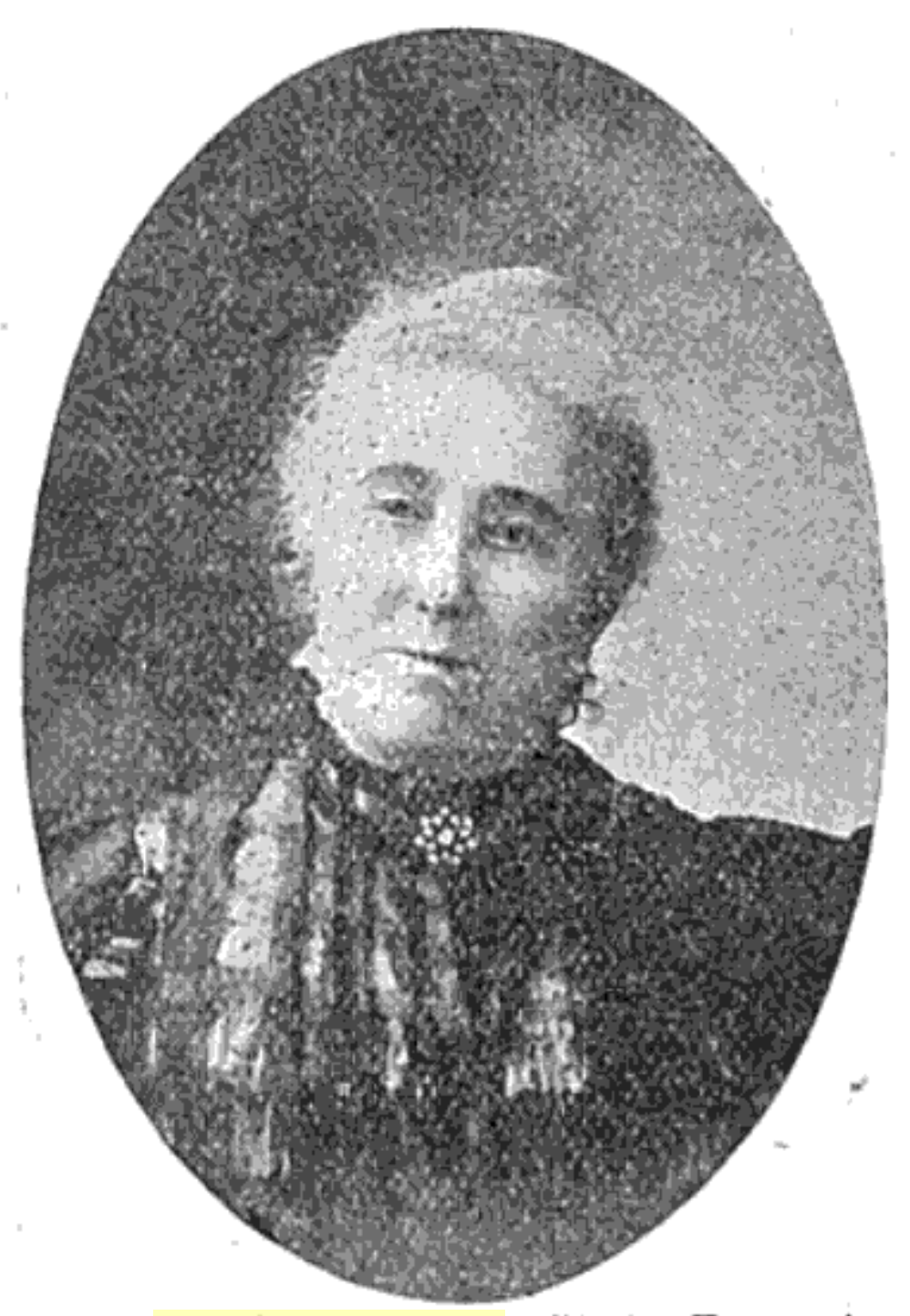
Photo in DAR Magazine, 1904

Peck was a devoted member of the Daughters of the American Revolution (DAR). She was regent of Hannah Caldwell chapter for fifteen years. For two years, she was State regent of the Iowa DAR, and was honored at the State and Continental Congresses. She attended a number of the gatherings of the DAR held in Washington, D.C. and other cities. She was a member of the national Mayflower Society. She was also a member of the Daughters of 1812 and of Founders and Patriots.

Peck wrote a series of articles for the national magazine of the American Historical Society on the subject, "Davenport and Its Environs". Other articles appeared in the Annals of Iowa on Fort Armstrong and Chief Black Hawk. She traveled in Europe and quite extensively in the U.S. Her travel writing on Italy appeared in the Weekly Outlook.

She was a public speaker and was often heard in conventions and conferences and on other public occasions.

She was one of the few American women who had the distinction of having her portrait and name appear in The Roll of Honor for Women (London), an annual biographical record of women of the world who had worked for the public good.

== Personal life ==
Peck had one daughter, Jessie Allen. Dr. Peck died on December 12, 1891.

Maria Purdy Peck died at her home in Davenport, Iowa, January 2, 1914, after an illness of about three months. Interment was at Oakdale Cemetery.

== Selected works ==
Fort Armstrong

- Fort Armstrong, 1893
