= Wolcott Square Historic District =

Historic district in New York, United States

- U.S. National Register of Historic Places
- U.S. Historic district
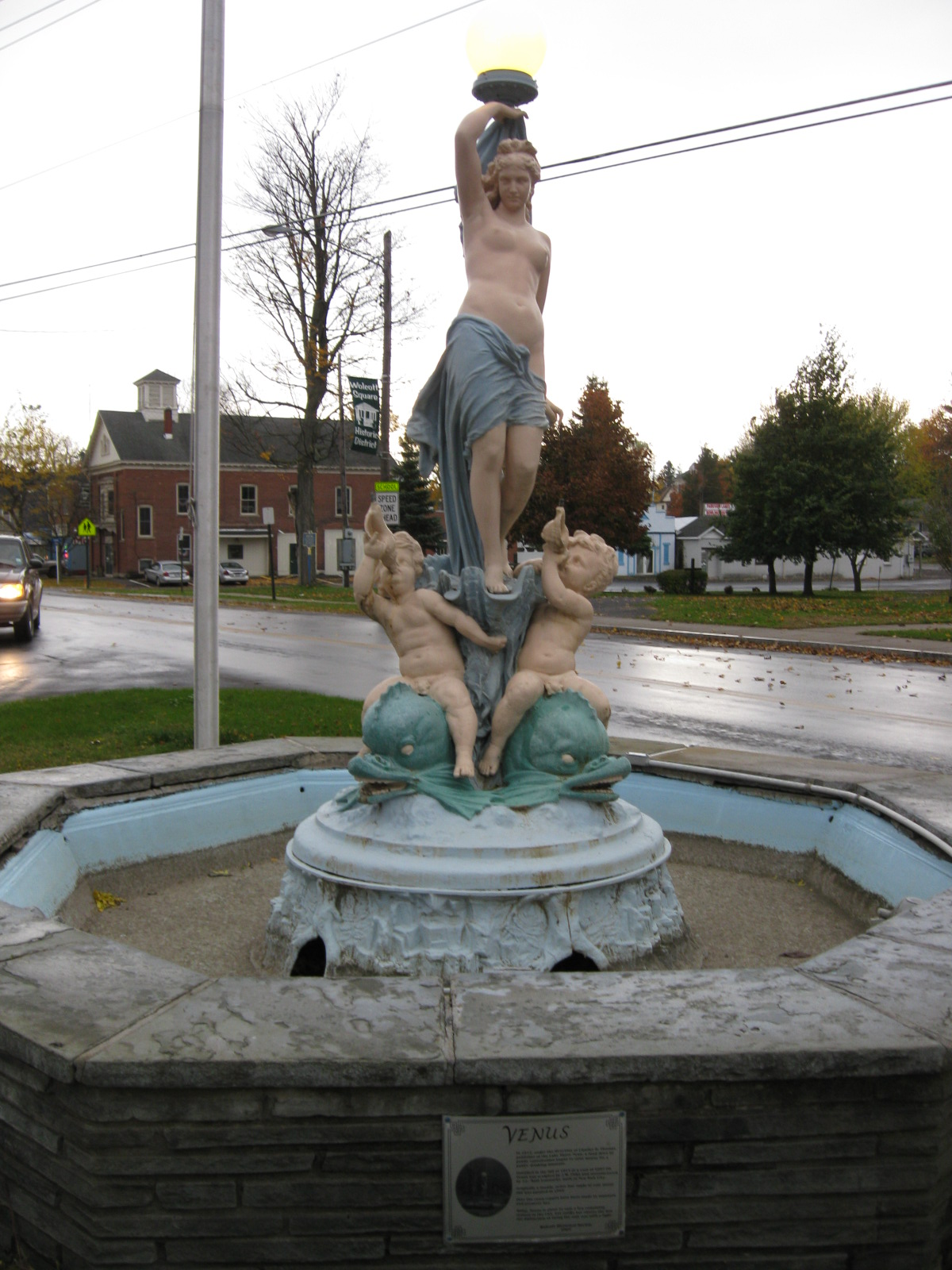
- Venus Fountain and Village Hall, October 2009

- Location within New York Location within the United States
- Location: W. Main, Park, and New Hartford Sts., Wolcott, New York
- Coordinates: 43°13′12″N 76°48′58″W
- Area: 3 acres (1.2 ha)
- Architect: Falk, L.B.
- Architectural style: Romanesque, Classical Revival
- NRHP reference No.: 00001692
- Added to NRHP: May 17, 2001

Wolcott Square Historic District is a national historic district located at the Village of Wolcott in Wayne County, New York. The district includes the First Baptist Church, First Presbyterian Church, the Village Hall, the 1.9-acre (0.77 ha) village green (Northrup Park), a bandstand, and a public fountain. The focal point is Northrup Park, laid out in 1813 for use by the local school district.

It was listed on the National Register of Historic Places in 2001.

On May 19, 2013, the First Presbyterian Church of Wolcott celebrated its bicentennial with an organ recital concert. The event also recognized the 11th anniversary of the church's Petty-Madden organ.

== Gallery ==
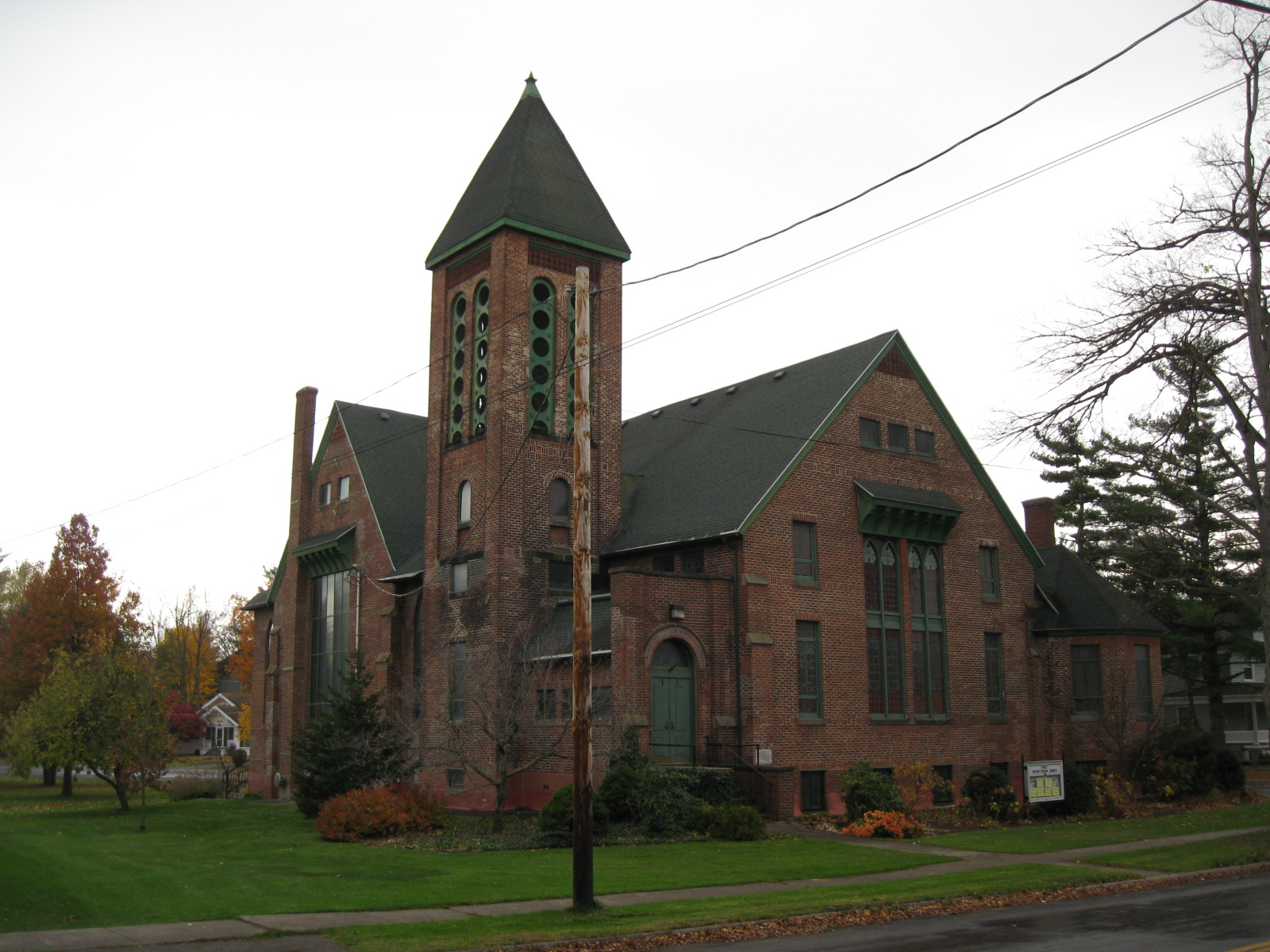
First Presbyterian Church, October 2009

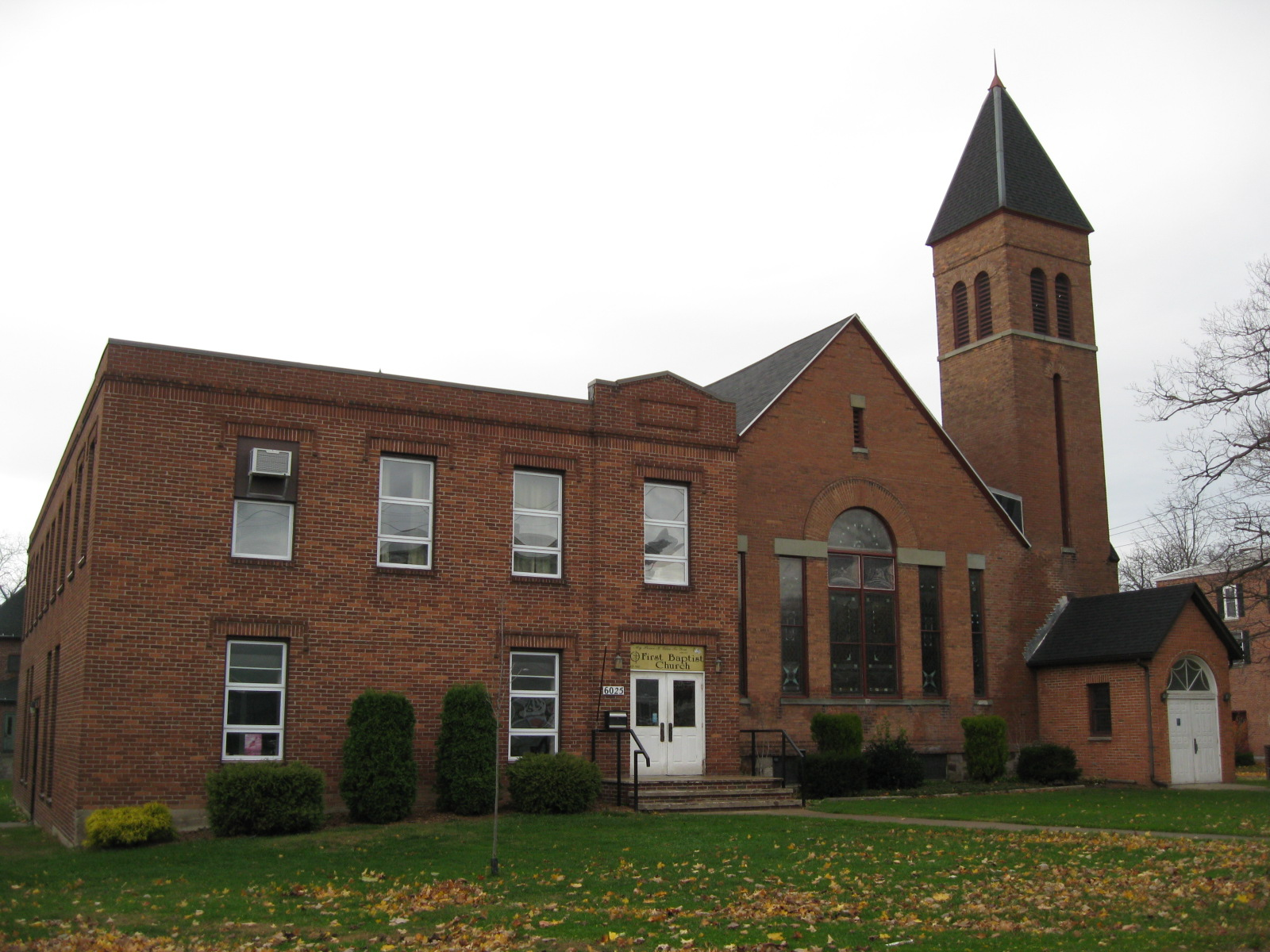
Wolcott Baptist Church, October 2009

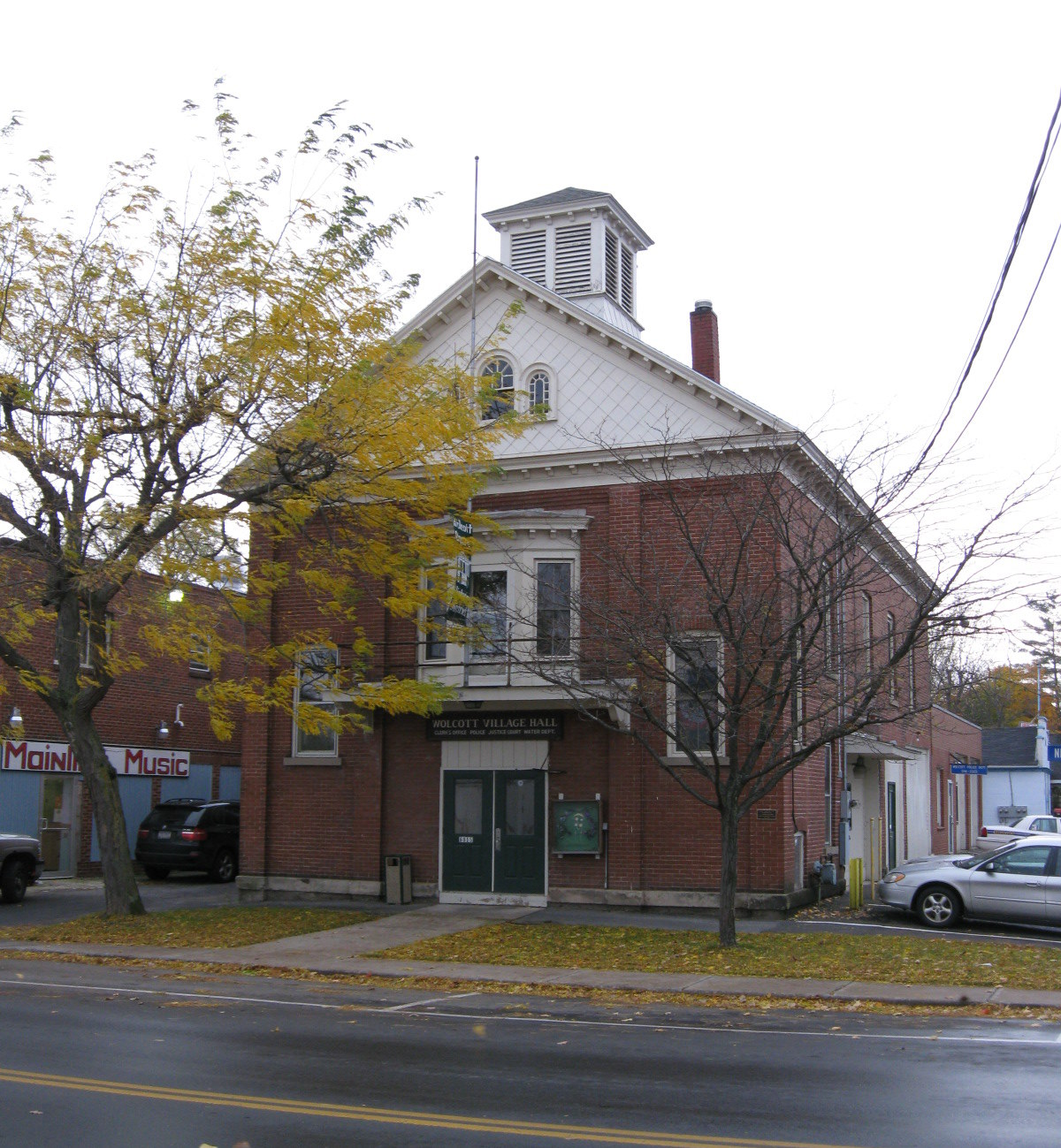
Wolcott Village Hall, October 2009

== See also ==
- National Register of Historic Places listings in Wayne County, New York
