= Magee, New York =

Hamlet in New York, United States

Coordinates: 42°57′40″N 76°50′46″W

Magee, also known as Magee's Corners, is a hamlet in the Town of Tyre, Seneca County, New York, United States, near the Junius town line. It is named after Thomas C. Magee, who built the first brick house in Magee. It is located five miles (8 km) north-northeast of the Village of Waterloo and six miles (10 km) northwest of the hamlet of Seneca Falls, at an elevation of 518 feet (158 m). The primary intersection in the hamlet is at N.Y. Route 414 and N.Y. Route 318. Magee is right off exit 41 of the New York State Thruway (Interstate 90).

Government offices for the Town of Tyre are located in the hamlet.
