= Roe Cobblestone Schoolhouse =

- U.S. National Register of Historic Places
- New York State Register of Historic Places
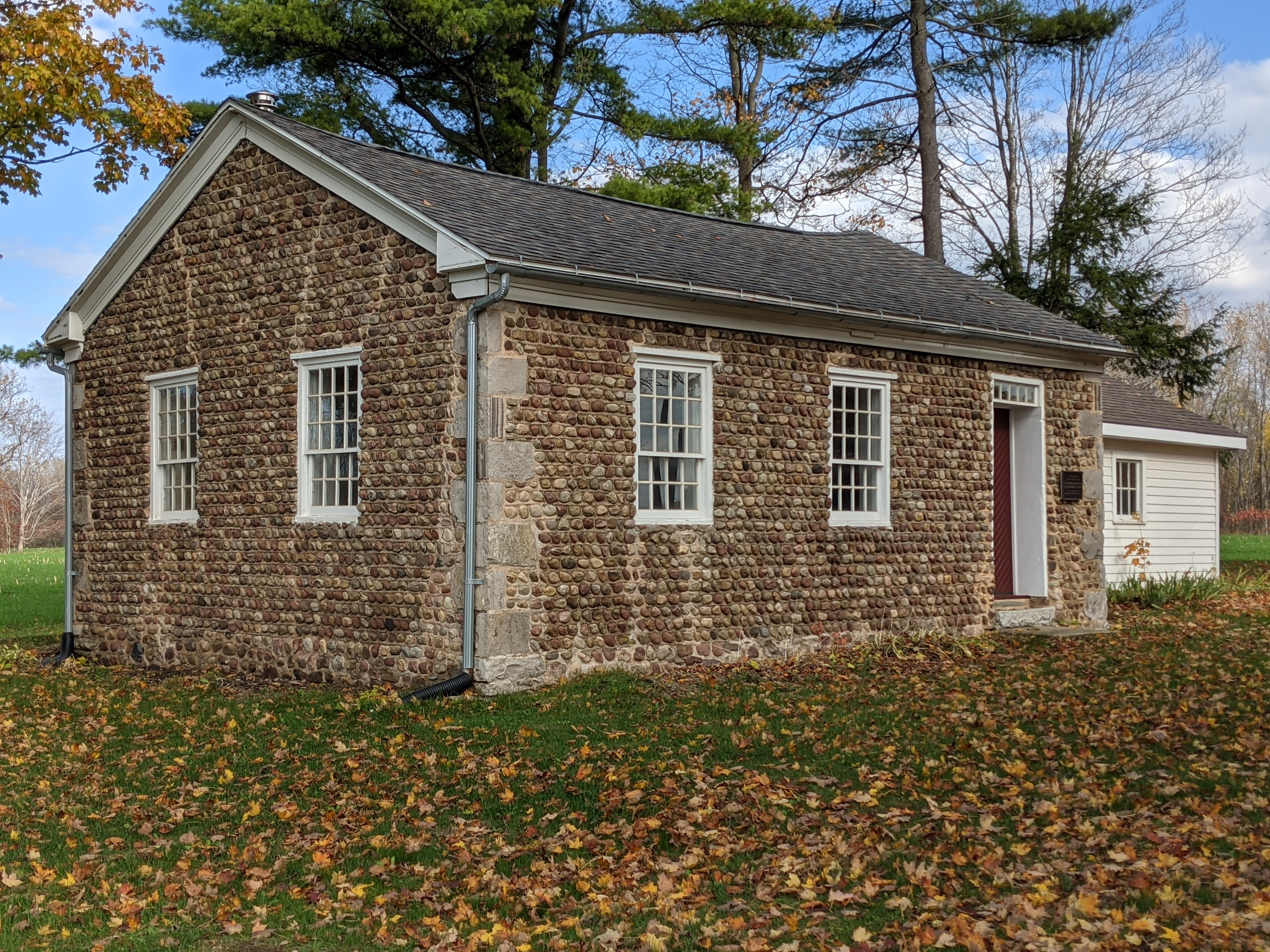

- Location within New York Location within the United States
- Location: 12397 Van Vleck Rd., Butler, New York
- Coordinates: 43°11′23″N 76°47′49″W
- Area: less than one acre
- Built: 1820
- Architectural style: Early 19th century
- MPS: Cobblestone Architecture of New York State MPS
- NRHP reference No.: 08000920
- NYSRHP No.: 11702.000013

Significant dates
- Added to NRHP: September 17, 2008
- Designated NYSRHP: June 23, 2008

Roe Cobblestone Schoolhouse is a historic one room school located at Butler in Wayne County, New York. The cobblestone building is a one-story, 28 feet long by 22 feet deep, three bay wide structure. It was built about 1820 and is constructed of irregularly shaped, multi-colored, field cobbles. It ceased to function as a school in 1932, used as a single family residence, and is now operated as a schoolhouse museum by the Butler Historical Society, which also operates the Butler Church Museum. Both museums are open on the first Saturday of the month from May through October.

The structure is among the approximately 170 surviving cobblestone buildings in Wayne County. It was listed on the National Register of Historic Places in 2008.
