= Hiram Lay Cobblestone Farmhouse =

Historic house in New York, United States

- U.S. National Register of Historic Places
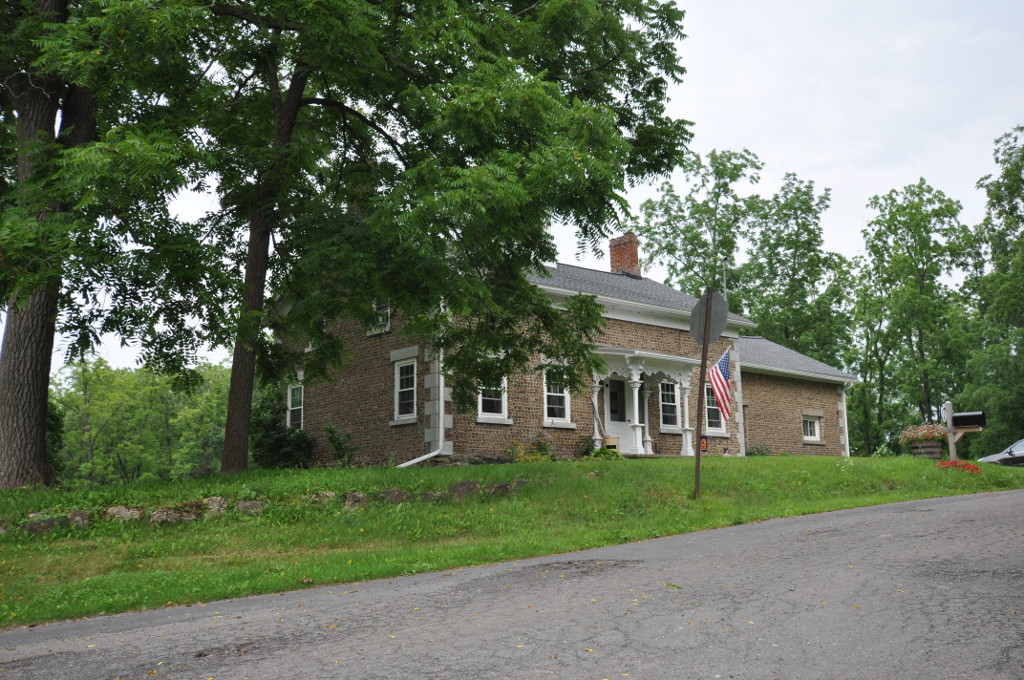

- Location within New York Location within the United States
- Location: 1145 Mays Point Rd., Tyre, New York
- Coordinates: 42°58′08″N 76°46′30″W
- Area: 13.2 acres (5.3 ha)
- Built: c. 1847-1848, c. 1910
- Architectural style: Greek Revival
- MPS: Cobblestone Architecture of New York State MPS
- NRHP reference No.: 09000724
- Added to NRHP: September 20, 2009

Hiram Lay Cobblestone Farmhouse, also known as the Cobblestone House at 1145 Old School House Road, is a historic home located at Tyre in Seneca County, New York. It is a 1 1/2-story, five-bay, cobblestone farmhouse with Greek Revival style detailing. It has a side-gable roof and one-story rear kitchen wing. The roof is topped by a hip roofed cupola. Also on the property is a contributing brick smokehouse. It is the only cobblestone building in Tyre and one of 18 remaining in Seneca County.

It was listed on the National Register of Historic Places in 2009.
