= New York State Route 318 =

Highway in New York

New York State Route 318
- Map of the Finger Lakes region with NY 318 highlighted in red

Route information
- Maintained by NYSDOT
- Length: 10.90 mi (17.54 km)
- Existed: c. 1963–present

Major junctions
- West end: I-90 / New York Thruway / NY 14 in Phelps
- East end: US 20 / NY 5 on Tyre–Seneca Falls town line

Location
- Country: United States
- State: New York
- Counties: Ontario, Seneca

Highway system
- New York Highways; Interstate; US; State; Reference; Parkways
← NY 317	→ NY 319
← NY 390	NY 390A	→ NY 391

New York State Route 318 (NY 318) is an east–west state highway in the Finger Lakes region of New York in the United States. The western terminus of the route is at an intersection with NY 14 at New York State Thruway (Interstate 90 or I-90) exit 42 in the town of Phelps. The eastern terminus is at an intersection with U.S. Route 20 (US 20) and NY 5 northeast of the hamlet of Seneca Falls. All but 0.70 miles (1.13 km) of the 10.90-mile (17.54 km) route is located in Seneca County.

The origins of NY 318 date back to the 19th century when the highway was part of a road connecting the village of Phelps to a bridge over the Seneca River near Cayuga Lake. It was mostly designated as Route 6-a, an unsigned legislative route, by the New York State Legislature in 1911. The section of Route 6-a from West Junius to Halsey Corners was designated as New York State Route 291 (west of Magee) and part of NY 89 (east of Magee) as part of the 1930 renumbering of state highways in New York. NY 291 was removed in the 1940s.

The alignments of NY 89 and NY 414 north of Seneca Falls were largely flipped in the 1950s, placing both highways on their modern alignments. Part of NY 89's former routing became a short-lived extension of New York State Route 390. All of NY 89's former routing from Magee to Halsey Corners was designated as NY 318 c. 1963. NY 318 was extended west to NY 14 in the 1970s over former NY 291.

== Route description ==
NY 318 begins at an intersection with NY 14 in an area of the Ontario County town of Phelps known as West Junius. West of the intersection, the right-of-way for NY 318 leads to the toll barrier for New York State Thruway (I-90) exit 42. The route heads eastward, crossing the Norfolk Southern Railway Corning Secondary line before passing into Seneca County a mere 0.70 miles (1.13 km) from NY 14.

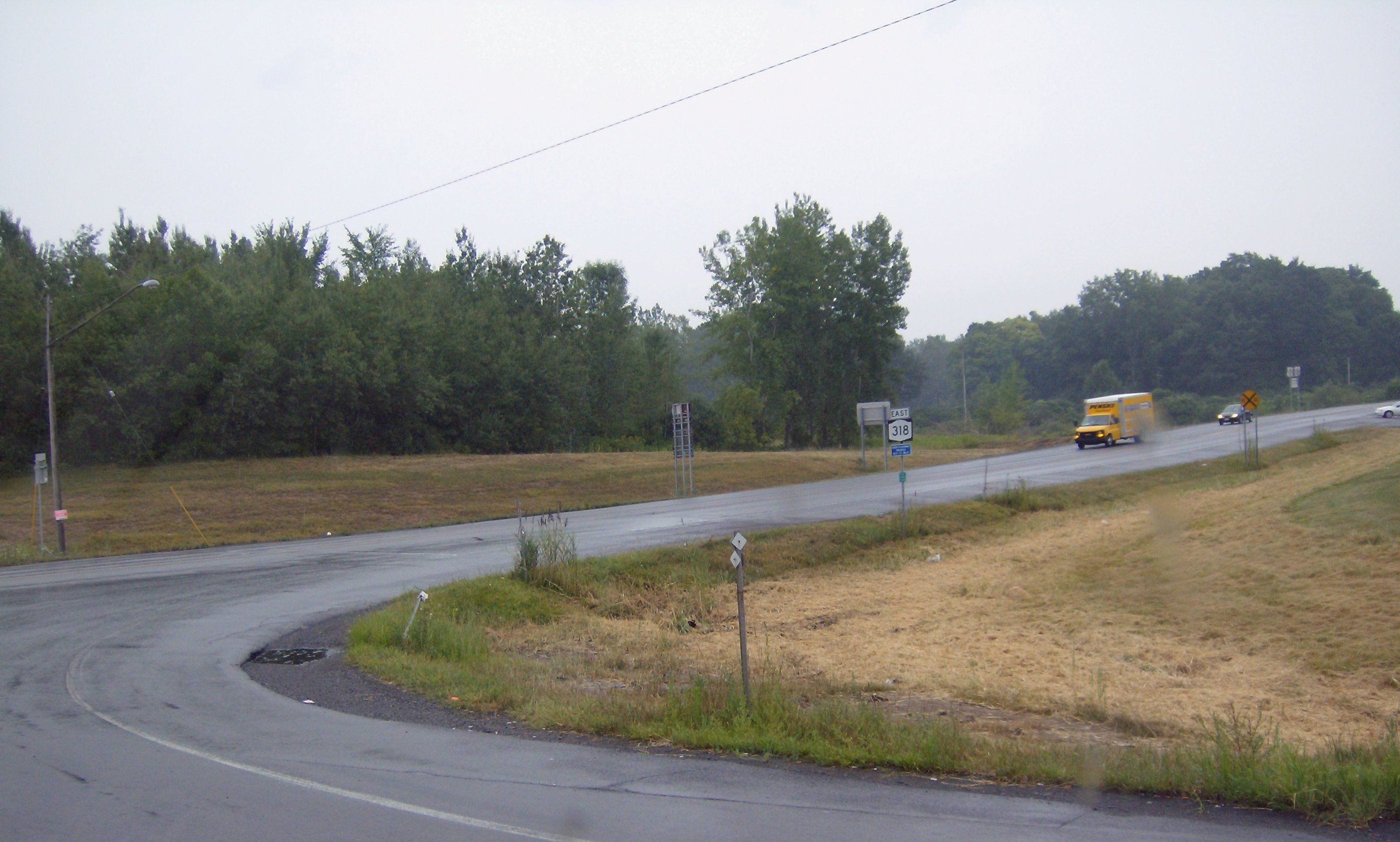
NY 318 as seen from NY 14 northbound

Now in the town of Junius, the route follows an alignment parallel to that of the Thruway as it passes south of a large housing development and by a series of small lakes collectively known as Junius Ponds. NY 318 continues on, passing through a mixture of forested areas and cultivated fields as it heads eastward through the town. Just past an intersection with Nine Foot Road (County Route 108 or CR 108), NY 318 serves the Waterloo Premium Outlets, a large collection of outlet stores situated between NY 318 and the Thruway. Past the outlet mall, the route continues through largely rural surroundings to the community of Stone Church Corner, where it briefly curves to the northeast before veering back to the east as it enters the town of Tyre.

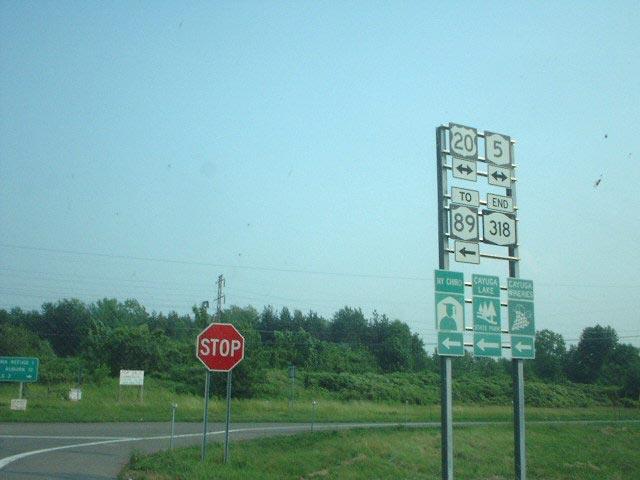
Eastern terminus of NY 318

Roughly 0.5 miles (0.8 km) from the town line, NY 318 enters the hamlet of Magee, a small community centered around NY 318's junction with NY 414 (Ridge Road). East of Magee, NY 318 turns to the southeast and begins to separate from the Thruway as it passes through vast, open fields. At the community of Nichols Corners, located at the intersection of NY 318 and Gravel Road (CR 101), the route curves back to the east and begins to straddle the Tyre–Seneca Falls town line. NY 318 ends 1.35 miles (2.17 km) later at an intersection with US 20 and NY 5. The junction is only 0.1 miles (0.16 km) west of where US 20 and NY 5 meet NY 89 at Halsey Corners, a point just west of the Montezuma National Wildlife Refuge and northwest of Cayuga Lake.

== History ==
=== Origins ===
On April 16, 1825, the New York State Legislature passed an act permitting the construction of a "free bridge" over the Seneca River. The bridge was ultimately constructed just north of Cayuga Lake near the site of the modern US 20 and NY 5 river crossing. A road was later built to connect the bridge to the village of Phelps by way of West Junius and Magee. The highway became known as the "free bridge state road". In 1908, the portion of the road from the free bridge to Halsey Corners was included as part of Route 6, an unsigned legislative route defined by the New York State Legislature as beginning in Buffalo and ending in Albany. The remainder of the old free bridge highway was designated as Route 6-a in 1911.

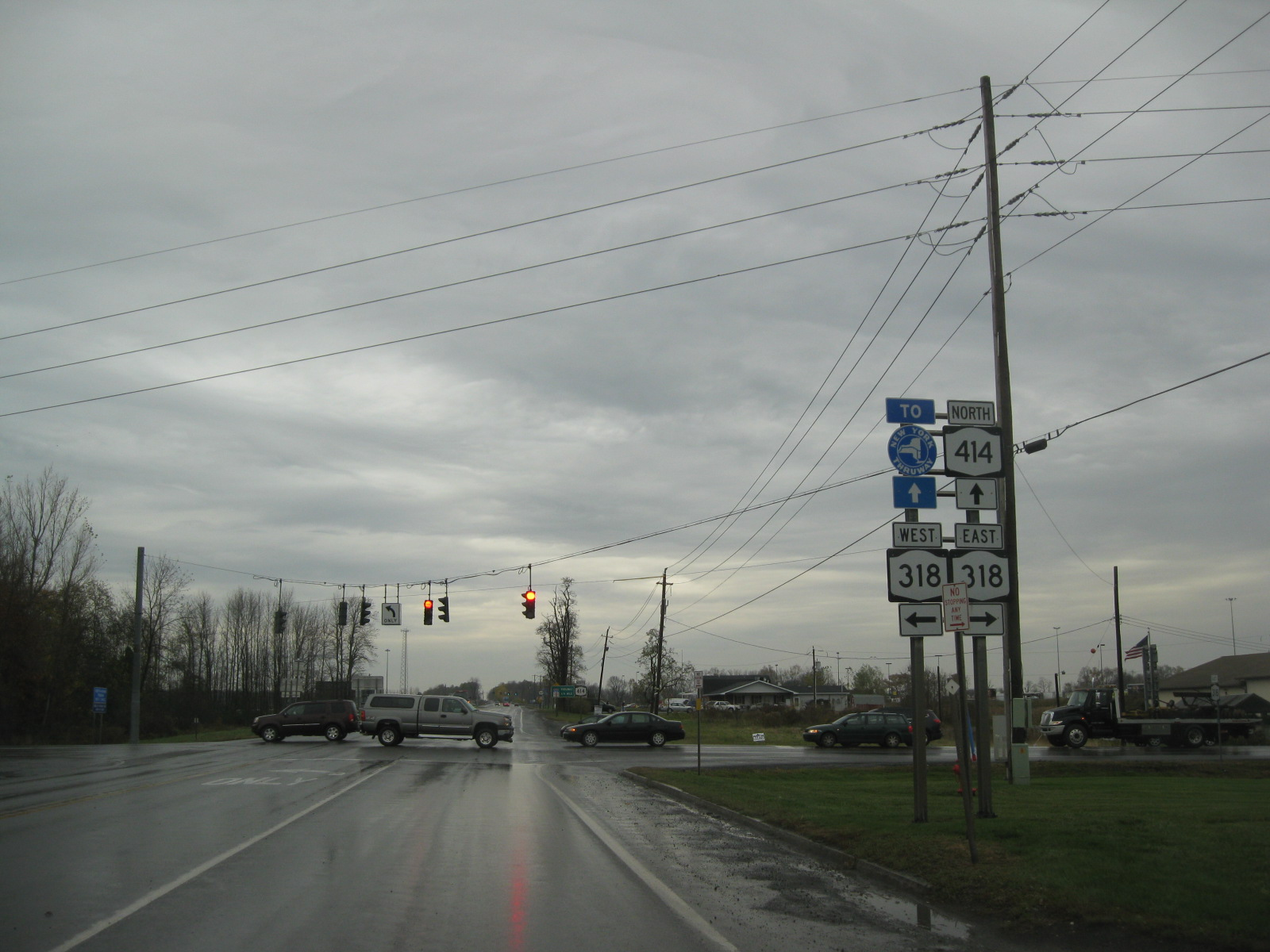
NY 318 at NY 414 in Magee. This intersection was the original western terminus of NY 318.

When the first set of posted routes in New York were assigned in 1924, the portion of Route 6-a from Phelps to West Junius was incorporated into NY 15 (modern NY 96), a route extending from Owego to Rochester. Farther east, the Route 6 segment of the old free bridge road was co-designated as part of NY 5 and NY 5A (now US 20 and NY 5), two cross-state highways linking Western New York to the Capital District. The remainder of the old highway—namely Route 6-a from West Junius to Halsey Corners—did not initially receive a designation.

=== Designations ===
The entirety of old Route 6-a between West Junius and Halsey Corners was assigned a designation as part of the 1930 renumbering of state highways in New York. From West Junius to Magee, the highway was designated as NY 291; meanwhile, the section from Magee to Halsey Corners became part of NY 89, which originally continued north from Magee to North Rose on what is now NY 414. At the same time, Black Brook Road, a connector between the village of Seneca Falls and NY 89 east of Magee, was assigned NY 390. In the mid-1930s, the portion of Gravel Road between US 20 and NY 5 and NY 89 was designated as NY 390A. The route was a spur route of NY 390 in name only as NY 390A never connected to NY 390. The NY 291 designation was deleted in the early 1940s.

The alignments of NY 89 and NY 414 north of US 20 and NY 5 were mostly swapped in the late 1950s; however, NY 414 continued south of Magee along its current alignment instead. At the same time, NY 390 was extended westward to Magee along the former routing of NY 89 while the NY 390A designation was deleted. The entirety of NY 89's former routing from Magee to Halsey Corners was redesignated as NY 318 c. 1963, resulting in the truncation of NY 390 back to its previous northern terminus before being removed altogether in the mid-1960s. NY 318 was extended west to its current terminus at NY 14 in West Junius in 1973. The former routings of NY 390 and NY 390A between NY 318 and the former Seneca Falls village line are now maintained by Seneca County as CR 102 (Black Brook Road) and part of CR 101 (Gravel Road), respectively.

== Major intersections ==
County	Location	mi	km	Destinations	Notes
Ontario	Town of Phelps	0.00	0.00	I-90 / New York Thruway / NY 14 – Buffalo, Albany, Geneva, Lyons	Western terminus; exit 42 (I-90 / Thruway)
Seneca	Tyre	6.79	10.93	NY 414 to I-90 / New York Thruway – Waterloo, Seneca Falls, Clyde	Hamlet of Magee
Seneca	Tyre–Seneca Falls town line	9.60	15.45	Gravel Road (CR 101)	Former northern terminus of NY 390A; hamlet of Nichols Corners
Seneca	Tyre–Seneca Falls town line	10.90	17.54	US 20 / NY 5 to NY 89 – Auburn, Seneca Falls, Montezuma National Wildlife Refuge	Eastern terminus; hamlet of Halsey Corners
1.000 mi = 1.609 km; 1.000 km = 0.621 mi

== See also ==
- List of county routes in Seneca County, New York
