= Methodist Episcopal Church of Butler =

Historic church in New York, United States

- U.S. National Register of Historic Places
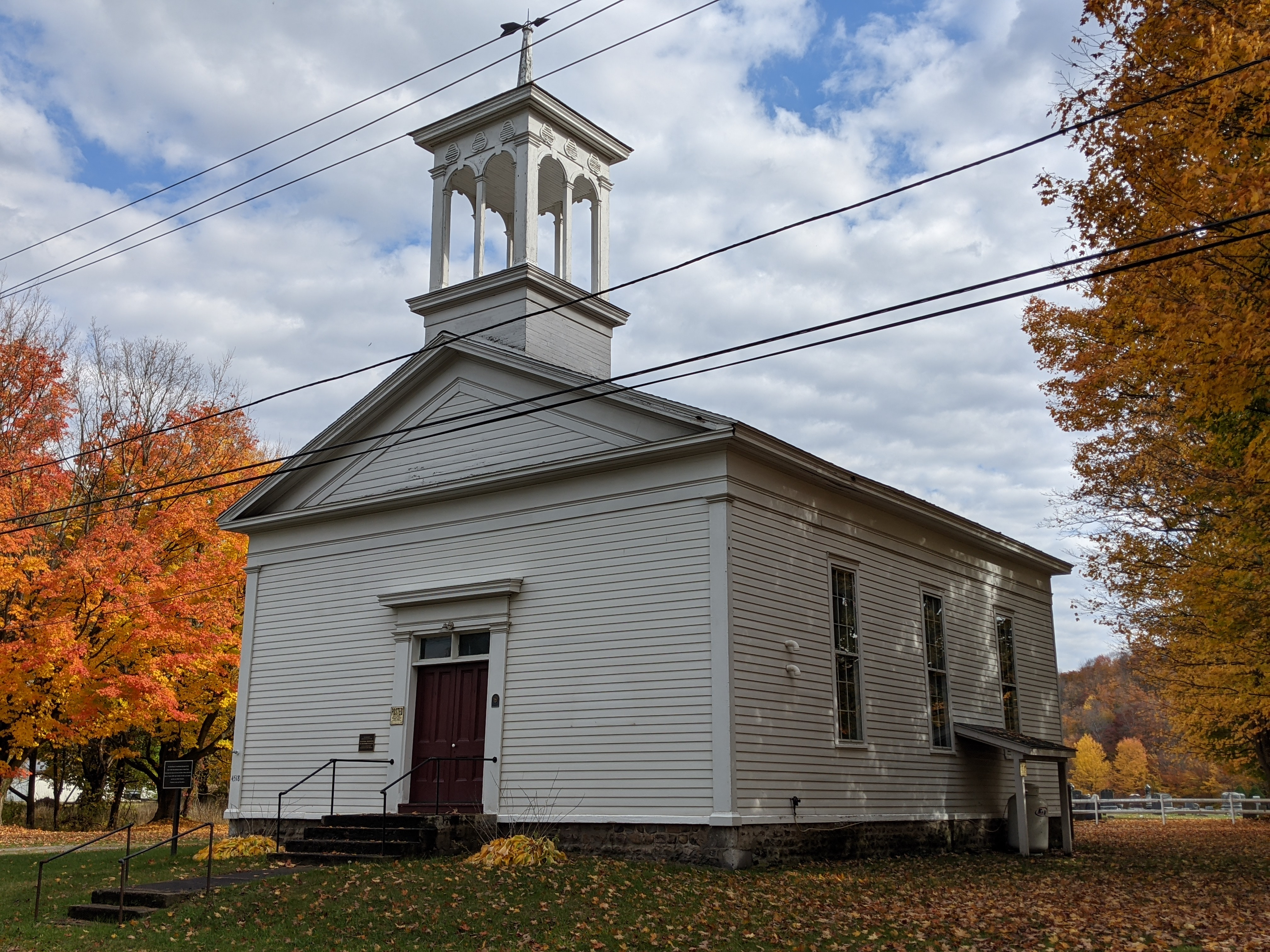

- Location within New York Location within the United States
- Location: Butler Center Rd., jct. with Washburn Rd., Butler Center, New York
- Coordinates: 43°10′6″N 76°46′17″W
- Area: 2.5 acres (1.0 ha)
- Built: 1836
- Architectural style: Greek Revival
- NRHP reference No.: 97001459
- Added to NRHP: November 24, 1997

Methodist Episcopal Church of Butler is a historic former Methodist Episcopal church located at Butler Center in Wayne County, New York. It is a rectangular, gable roofed frame building designed in a vernacular Greek Revival style and built about 1836. It rests on a cobblestone foundation and is surmounted by an open belfry. Also on the property is a cemetery (non-contributing), established in 1864.

The building was listed on the National Register of Historic Places in 1997.

== Butler Church Museum ==
The building is now operated as the Butler Church Museum by the Butler Historical Society. It is open on the first Saturday of the month from May through October.

The Society also operates the Roe Cobblestone Schoolhouse as a museum.
