= Savannah (CDP), New York =

Savannah, New York
- Hamlet and CDP
- Location within the state of New York
- Coordinates: 43°04′00″N 76°45′34″W
- Country: United States
- State: New York
- County: Wayne
- Town: Savannah
- Settled: 1854
- Incorporated: April 15, 1867
- Dissolved: December 31, 1979

Area
  - Total: 1.18 sq mi (3.05 km^{2})
  - Land: 1.18 sq mi (3.05 km^{2})
  - Water: 0 sq mi (0.00 km^{2})
- Elevation: 420 ft (128 m)

Population (2020)
  - Total: 487
  - Density: 412.9/sq mi (159.43/km^{2})
- Time zone: UTC-5 (Eastern (EST))
  - Summer (DST): UTC-4 (EDT)
- ZIP Code: 13146
- Area codes: 315 and 680
- FIPS code: 36-65332
- GNIS feature ID: 2631236

Savannah is a hamlet (and census-designated place) located in the Town of Savannah, Wayne County, New York, United States. The population was 558 at the 2010 census. Savannah was incorporated as a village in 1867, but dissolved in 1979. Government offices for the Town of Savannah are located in the hamlet.

== History ==
The community of Savannah was established along the old New York Central Railroad in 1854 and incorporated as a village thirteen years later, initially covering roughly 1,200 acres (4.9 km^{2}) of Military Lots #64 and #65 within the Town of Savannah (known at that time as Township #27). By 1877, the village had three church societies, a union schoolhouse, a hotel, a steam-stave mill and a number of shops and stores. Unfortunately, in the early morning hours of November 3, 1908, a fire swept throughout Savannah and destroyed most of the village. Twenty-two buildings were consumed by fire and twelve families were left homeless. Many of the buildings on Main Street were left in ruins. The village was eventually rebuilt.

On March 21, 1978, voters decided 134–75 in favor of dissolution. The Village of Savannah was officially dissolved on December 31, 1979. All government activities previously managed by the village are now handled by the Town of Savannah.

== Geography ==
Savannah is located at 43°04′00″N 76°45′34″W.

According to the United States Census Bureau, the CDP has a total area of 1.2 square miles (3.1 km^{2}), all land.

The primary intersection in Savannah is at N.Y. Route 31 and N.Y. Route 89.

== Demographics ==
Historical population
Census	Pop.	Note	%±
2020	487		—
U.S. Decennial Census

As of the census of 2010, there were 558 people, 214 households, and 137 families residing in the CDP. The population density was 465.0 people per square mile (179.5 people/km^{2}). The racial makeup of the CDP was 98.2% White, 1.1% Black or African American, 0.4% Native American, 0.0% Asian, 0.0% Pacific Islander, 0.0% from other races, and 0.4% from two or more races. Hispanic or Latino of any race were 1.4% of the population.

There were 214 households, out of which 24.8% had children under the age of 18 living with them, 47.2% were married couples living together, 11.2% had a female householder with no husband present, and 36.0% were non-families. 30.8% of all households were made up of individuals, and 14.9% had someone living alone who was 65 years of age or older. The average household size was 2.56 and the average family size was 3.06.

In the CDP, the population was spread out, with 27.6% under the age of 20, 3.2% from 20 to 24, 22.2% from 25 to 44, 31.6% from 45 to 64, and 15.4% who were 65 years of age or older. The median age was 41.8 years. For every 100 females, there were 88.5 males. For every 100 females age 18 and over, there were 91.4 males.

The median income for a household in the CDP was $38,750, and the median income for a family was $39,853. Males had a median income of $37,813 versus $33,333 for females. The per capita income for the CDP was $18,878. About 5.1% of families and 15.2% of the population were below the poverty line, including 16.7% of those under age 18 and 21.5% of those age 65 or over.

=== Housing ===
There were 245 housing units at an average density of 204.2 per square mile (78.8/km^{2}). 12.7% of housing units were vacant.

There were 214 occupied housing units in the CDP. 166 were owner-occupied units (77.6%), while 48 were renter-occupied (22.4%). The homeowner vacancy rate was 2.3% of total units. The rental unit vacancy rate was 15.8%.
