= Montezuma Marsh =

Coordinates: 42°57′56″N 76.°45′26″W

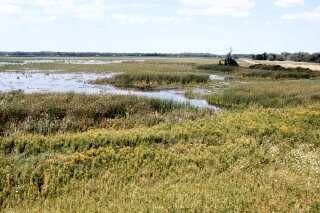
Montezuma National Wildlife Refuge four miles northeast of Seneca Falls

Montezuma Marsh is a marsh at the northern end of Cayuga Lake in the Finger Lakes region of New York. Much of the marsh is part of the Montezuma National Wildlife Refuge, which is a major point on the route of many migratory birds, such as Canada geese and mallard ducks.

The Cayuga valley is an old preglacial valley, which once drained northward into the Ontario Valley. Cayuga Lake and Montezuma Marsh were partially created by the damming effect of huge quantities of glacial drift brought from the Laurentian Shield of Canada and the deepened Ontario valley. (Cayuga Lake was also deepened southward of the area of the marsh.) The valley is completely buried by a drumlin field between the marsh and Lake Ontario.

The marsh was a barrier to westward travel in colonial times as roads could not be built across it with the technology of the time. The first major passageway was the Erie Canal, which was completed in 1825 but the digging of the section that crossed the marsh was one of the most difficult, with great loss of life due to mosquito-borne fevers (possibly malaria). The cut was finally finished by digging it in the winter (also with great suffering, due to frostbite) when mosquitoes were dormant.

== Bibliography ==
- Monje, Scott C. (2005). "Cayuga Marshes". In Peter R. Eisenstadt; Laura-Eve Moss (eds.). The encyclopedia of New York State. Syracuse: Syracuse University Press. pp. 292–93. ISBN 9780815608080. OCLC 57506556.
- "Montezuma Marsh". Geographic Names Information System. United States Geological Survey, United States Department of the Interior.
