= Wolcott (village), New York =

Wolcott, New York
- Village
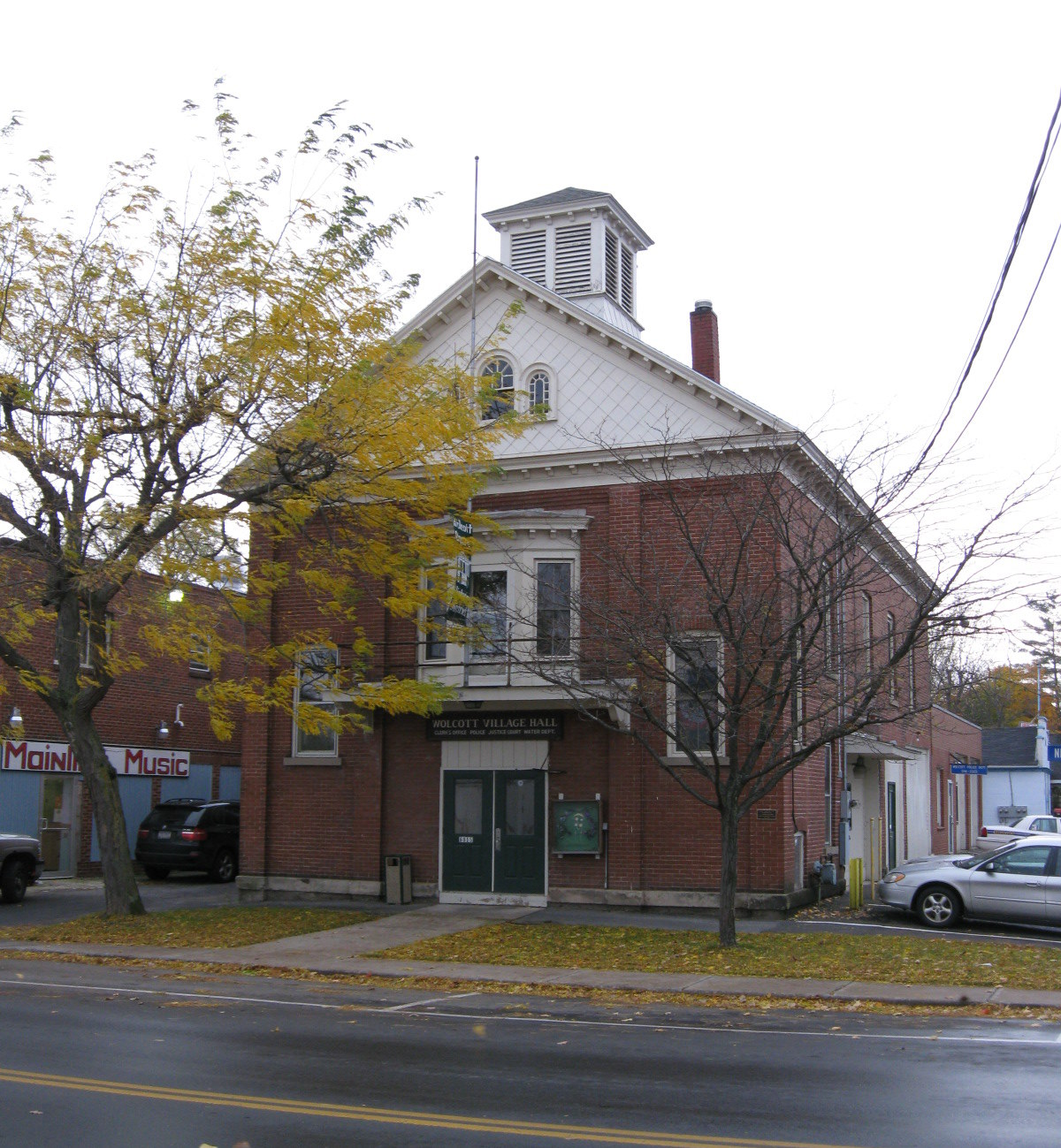
- Wolcott Village Hall, October 2009

- Location in Wayne County and the state of New York.

- Location within the state of New York
- Coordinates: 43°13′14″N 76°48′56″W
- Country: United States
- State: New York
- County: Wayne
- Town(s): Wolcott and Butler
- Settled: 1805
- Incorporated: February 24, 1852
- Named for: Oliver Wolcott

Government
  - Type: Board of Trustees
  - Mayor: Christopher J. Henner
  - Clerk: Fran Acker
  - Court: Justice Scott C. Stone

Area
  - Total: 1.97 sq mi (5.09 km^{2})
  - Land: 1.95 sq mi (5.04 km^{2})
  - Water: 0.019 sq mi (0.05 km^{2})
- Elevation: 371 ft (113 m)

Population (2020)
  - Total: 1,556
  - Density: 798.9/sq mi (308.47/km^{2})
- Time zone: UTC-5 (EST)
  - Summer (DST): UTC-4 (EDT)
- ZIP Code(s): 14590
- Area codes: 315 and 680
- FIPS code: 36-82678
- GNIS feature ID: 0971538
- Website: https://villageofwolcottny.gov/

Wolcott is a village in Wayne County, New York, United States. The population was 1,701 at the 2010 census. The name is from Oliver Wolcott, a former governor of Connecticut.

The Village of Wolcott is in the southwest part of the Town of Wolcott and is west of Syracuse, New York. Part of the southward spread of the village is in the Town of Butler.

== History ==
The land where the village is now located was purchased in 1805 by Jonathan Melvin.

The area was settled by people from New England.

The village was first incorporated in 1852 and re-incorporated in 1873.

In the years 1874, 1876, 1879, and 1884 the village experienced major destructive fires.

A statue of "Venus arising from the sea" was purchased for $875 in 1913 to mark a public drinking fountain at a natural spring. This statue was one of six and still stands proudly in the center of the village.

Wolcott means "wolf's denn or cottage"

The Wolcott Square Historic District was listed on the National Register of Historic Places in 2001.

== Geography ==
According to the United States Census Bureau, the village has a total area of 2.0 square miles (5.1 km^{2}), of which 2.0 square miles (5.1 km^{2}) is land and 0.04 square mile (0.1 km^{2}) (1.02%) is water.

Wolcott Creek flows northward through the village and empties into Port Bay, an arm of Lake Ontario.

County Roads 155, 160, 163 (Ridge Road, Old Route 104), and 261 converge on the village. New York State Route 104 and New York State Route 89 pass immediately south of the village.

== Demographics ==
Historical population
Census	Pop.	Note	%±
1870	658		—
1890	902		—
1900	1,279		41.8%
1910	1,216		−4.9%
1920	1,186		−2.5%
1930	1,260		6.2%
1940	1,326		5.2%
1950	1,516		14.3%
1960	1,641		8.2%
1970	1,617		−1.5%
1980	1,496		−7.5%
1990	1,544		3.2%
2000	1,712		10.9%
2010	1,701		−0.6%
2020	1,556		−8.5%
U.S. Decennial Census

As of the census of 2010, there were 1,701 people, 702 households, and 410 families residing in the village. The population density was 895.3 inhabitants per square mile (345.7/km^{2}). The racial makeup of the village was 93.6% White, 3.0% Black or African American, 0.1% Native American, 0.2% Asian, 0.0% Pacific Islander, 1.6% from other races, and 1.6% from two or more races. Hispanic or Latino of any race were 5.4% of the population.

There were 702 households, out of which 28.1% had children under the age of 18 living with them, 38.2% were married couples living together, 13.7% had a female householder with no husband present, and 41.6% were non-families. 35.0% of all households were made up of individuals, and 16.1% had someone living alone who was 65 years of age or older. The average household size was 2.41 and the average family size was 3.11.

In the village, the population was spread out, with 29.2% under the age of 20, 4.9% from 20 to 24, 24.4% from 25 to 44, 25.9% from 45 to 64, and 15.6% who were 65 years of age or older. The median age was 38.5 years. For every 100 females, there were 97.8 males. For every 100 females age 18 and over, there were 96.1 males.

The median income for a household in the village was $31,875, and the median income for a family was $42,083. Males had a median income of $34,485 versus $35,583 for females. The per capita income for the village was $19,743. About 20.8% of families and 27.8% of the population were below the poverty line, including 37.0% of those under age 18 and 21.9% of those age 65 or over.

=== Housing ===
There were 766 housing units at an average density of 403.2 per square mile (155.7/km^{2}); a total of 8.4% of housing units were vacant.

There were 702 occupied housing units in the village; 415 were owner-occupied units (59.1%), while 287 were renter-occupied (40.9%). The homeowner vacancy rate was 3.7% of total units. The rental unit vacancy rate was 6.2%.
