= Montezuma National Wildlife Refuge =

Wildlife preserve in Central New York

- IUCN category IV (habitat/species management area)
- Location within the United States
- Location: Seneca County, New York
- Nearest city: Seneca Falls, New York
- Coordinates: 42°58′N 76°44′W
- Area: 10,004.58 acres (40.4871 km^{2})
- Established: 1937
- Governing body: U.S. Fish and Wildlife Service
- Website: Montezuma National Wildlife Refuge

U.S. National Natural Landmark
- Designated: May 1973

Montezuma National Wildlife Refuge is a wildlife preserve operated by the United States Fish and Wildlife Service, encompassing part of the Montezuma Swamp at the north end of Cayuga Lake. The 10,004-acre (40.48 km^{2}) preserve is composed of swamps, pools and channels and is a stopping point for migratory birds. It is the largest contiguous wetland complex in the northeastern United States and comprises a portion of the larger Montezuma Wetlands Complex, which is managed by a partnership between the USFWS, the New York State Department of Environmental Conservation, as well as several other non-profit support organizations.

A significant stopover along the Atlantic Flyway, the refuge plays a crucial role in offering essential migration and nesting grounds for various bird species, including waterfowl, marsh birds, shorebirds, raptors, warblers, woodpeckers, and more.

Opened in 1938 as the Montezuma Migratory Bird Refuge, the area has seen many developments over the years in terms of its land size and wildlife management strategy. In May 1973 The Montezuma Marshes were designated a National Natural Landmark.

The refuge lies between the cities of Rochester and Syracuse, New York (five miles [8 km] east of Seneca Falls, and ten miles [16 km] west of Auburn), including parts of Seneca, Cayuga, and Wayne counties. Most of the refuge lies in the Town of Tyre, in the northeast corner of Seneca County.

== Wildlife and ecology ==
Recognized as an Audubon Important Bird Area, the refuge plays a crucial role in offering essential migration and nesting grounds for various bird species, including waterfowl, marsh birds, shorebirds, raptors, warblers, woodpeckers, and more. It is considered to be among the most important wetland complexes in the north eastern United States providing critical stopover habitat for millions of migratory birds. It also provides unique habitats for regionally breeding birds and wildlife, including many endangered species. Here a vast number of species interact, in a rich and robust ecosystem. The variety of habitats at Montezuma, including wooded wetlands, emergent marsh, and different vegetation stages in upland areas, supports a diverse range of resident and migratory species.

=== Flora ===
Most of the wetlands are dominated by emergent vegetation and therefore classified as marshes, which are home to diverse array of plants. Multiple species of fern, such as rattlesnake ferns, ebony Spleenwort, and the intermediate wood fern can be found within the refuge. Coniferous trees include eastern white pine, northern white cedar, and eastern red cedar. There are countless flowering plants which include the purple prairie clover, marsh pea, white avens, black raspberry, steeple bush and many more.

Invasive species are an ongoing concern for conservationist at the refuge. Among these are the purple loosestrife and phragmities.

=== Fauna ===
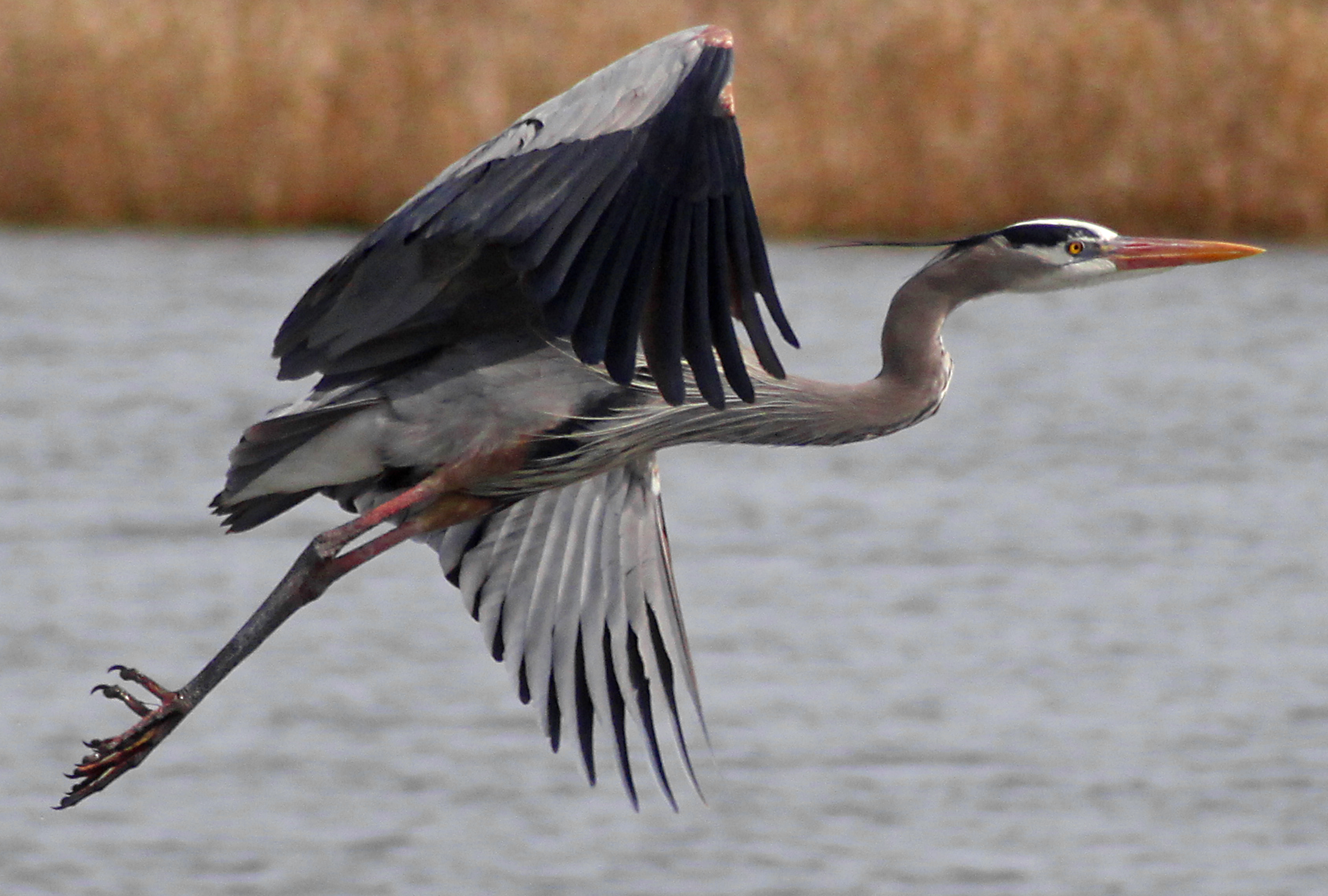
A great blue heron at Montezuma National Wildlife Refuge.

The refuge serves as crucial habitat for over 300 bird species, with more than 100 known to actively nest within its boundaries. Marsh and water birds found at the refuge include the great blue heron, green-backed heron, great egret, black-crowned night-heron, Virginia rail, sora, bitterns, common moorhen and pied-billed grebes. The refuge also has an area where bald eagles have been nesting in recent years. Ducks and geese, including Canada geese, snow geese, black ducks and mallards are common at the refuge.

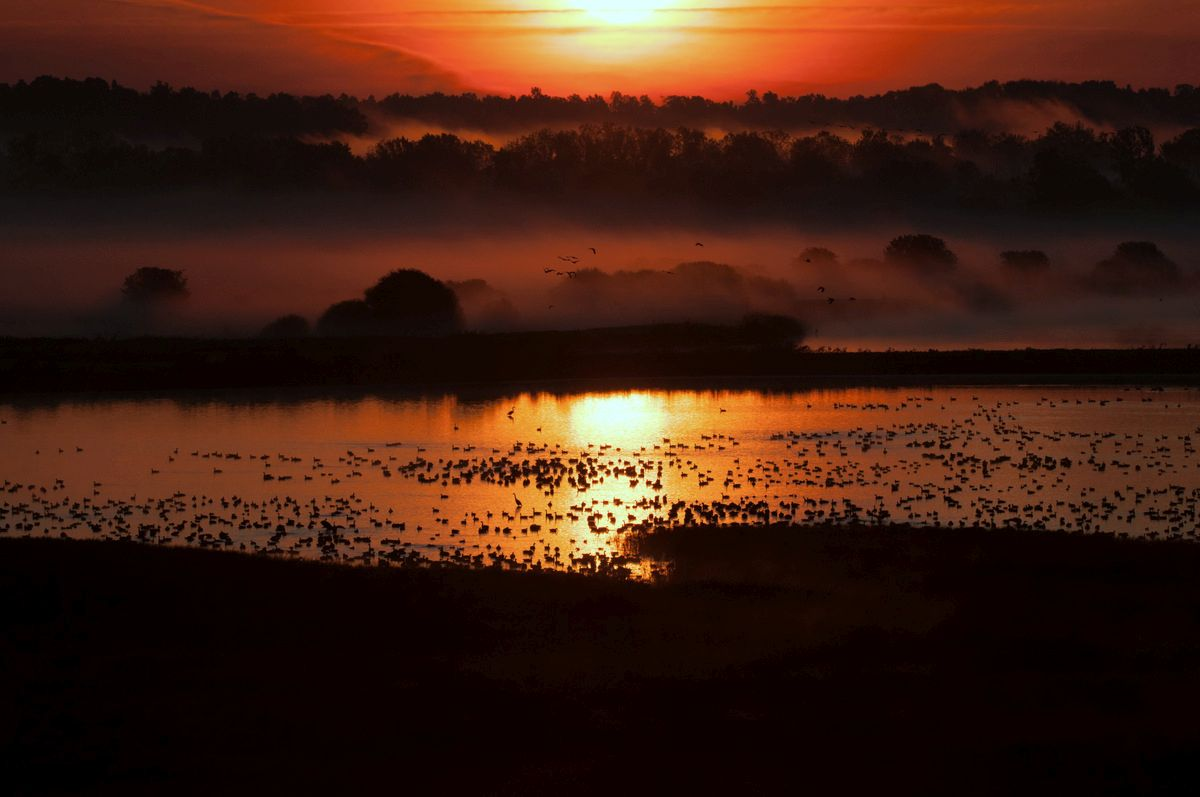
Sunrise over Knox Marsh

Mammalian species that roam this refuge include raccoon, coyote, muskrat, squirrel, red fox, chipmunk, beaver, gray fox and bats. Reptile and Amphibian species include spring peepers, snapping turtle, and tree frogs.

In 2011, a new species, Calamoncosis carncrossi, was discovered in the Carncross Salt Pond Preserve, an extensive inland salt pond owned by the complex. The new species was assigned to the subgenus Calamoncosis of genus Calamoncosis.

== History ==
The Finger Lakes Region was formed by the melting glaciers of the last glacial period, over ten thousand years ago. The northern and southern ends of the lakes gradually developed into extensive marshes. First the Algonquin Indians and later the Cayugas of the Iroquois Nation were the earliest known inhabitants to reap the rewards of the bountiful life in the marsh. The name "Montezuma" was first used in 1806 when Dr. Peter Clark named his hilltop home "Montezuma" after the palace of the Aztec Emperor Montezuma in Mexico City. Eventually the Marsh, the Village, and the Refuge all acquired the name.

There were no dramatic changes in the marsh until the development of the Erie Canal in the 19th century, when it became apparent that feeder canals from Seneca Lake and Cayuga Lake would in time link these lakes with the main line. With canal construction, there arose the possibility of draining the marshes, and an act was passed relative to the draining of the Cayuga Marshes. Work first began on the canal system on July 4, 1817, and the completion was marked by the first passage from Lake Erie to New York City on October 26, 1825. Construction of the Seneca-Cayuga canal began in 1818 and by 1828 boats passed from Geneva to the Erie Canal at Montezuma. The Erie Canal did not greatly affect the marshes as the Seneca River still flowed directly from Cayuga Lake into the marshes.

In 1910, the widening and reconstruction of the Seneca and Cayuga extension of the New York State Barge Canal altered the marshes. A lock was built at the north end of Cayuga Lake and a dam was constructed at the outlet of the lake. This effectively lowered the level of the river by eight to ten feet (2 to 3 m) and the waters drained from the marshes. The meandering rivers were straightened and deepened, thereby creating additional drainage-ways.

In 1937 the Bureau of Biological Survey, which later became the US Fish and Wildlife Service, purchased 6,432 acres (26.03 km^{2}) of the former marsh. The Civilian Conservation Corps began work on a series of low dikes which would hold water and restore part of the marsh habitat that had once existed.

The refuge was opened in 1938 as the Montezuma Migratory Bird Refuge. President Franklin D. Roosevelt signed Executive Order 7971 which established the Bird Refuge on September 12, 1938. The refuge provides a stopping point for waterfowl and other migratory birds. The refuge restored marsh land lost to drainage from the construction of the Cayuga and Seneca Canal that linked the Finger Lakes to the Erie Canal.

In May 1973, the refuge was designated as the Montezuma Marshes National Natural Landmark by the Secretary of the Department of the Interior.

On September 22, 2000, "Harmony With Nature"—an eight-person team of musicians from around the country—performed a four-hour, afternoon/evening concert at the refuge, featuring the music of the late John Denver. The speakers and musicians/performers were: Pete Lee Baker, Tom Jasikoff (Montezuma NWR's manager), Tim Bak, Rob Bidinger, Val Cooper, Frank DeLaMarre, Paul Swanton and Brian Taylor (who also served as emcee of the event). Baker and Jasikoff conceived the idea for the performance, which developed into a series of "Harmony With Nature" concerts by the group, held on this and other federally protected land over 2000–2001 (four concerts in total, counting Montezuma NWR). This concert at Montezuma NWR marked the first time that a musical performance had ever been held on federally protected wildlife land. These musicians donated their talents and time by joining together to promote Denver’s legacy and to continue supporting his lifelong commitment to ensuring the preservation of the earth and all its natural habitats. The fundraising efforts also benefitted Montezuma NWR and the other wildlife sanctuaries, supporting and celebrating wildlife conservation efforts, ecological awareness, environmental education and habitat protection. Baker and Jasikoff also appeared in local, in-studio television interviews regarding the event.

On September 24, 2017, another "Harmony With Nature" event was held there, with Rebecca Colleen, Bill Destler, Jim Clare and Perry Cleaveland providing a two-hour, afternoon music show at the refuge.

== Conservation management ==
The presence of vegetation significantly impacts both nesting birds and migratory species that rely on the Refuge as a stopover point. More than 1,100 acres of land are currently designated as grass or brush, featuring a variety of planted grass species. Grassland and shrubland habitats are also subjected to routine mowing and clearing to impede natural succession towards forest growth. A meticulously planned and executed fire management strategy is implemented to stimulate the growth of grasslands and maintain these areas in an early successional stage. Typically scheduled for April, prescribed burns demand careful planning and specialized training.

Present forest management practices involve overseeing the growth of trees, investigating the interaction of indigenous species on the environment, and monitoring for potential threats from invasive species. To enhance diversity and potentially boost insect availability, a mix of forbs or wildflowers have been introduced.

=== Water level management ===
The construction of dams and canals in the early 1900s led to the drainage of the marshes, causing local wildlife to disappear. The Civilian Conservation Corps intervened, implementing a system of constructed dikes that restored water levels and brought wildlife back to the area.

Today, the water level is controlled through impoundments to recreate historic habitat conditions. These impoundments are strategically rotated to cater to different groups of species, such as migrating waterfowl, shorebirds, black terns, American and least bitterns, and pied-billed grebes. Each species requires specific water levels and habitat conditions, and the impoundments are managed in a rotation to provide a diverse range of habitats at any given time.

Heavy equipment is used to construct dikes that contain water, forming each refuge pool. Additionally, every pool is equipped with a water control structure to facilitate controlled drainage for optimal habitat conditions. The Main Pool has an inlet from a nearby lake, allowing it to be filled by gravity-fed water. In contrast, other pools depend on pumped water or rainfall for refilling. Pools may be intentionally drained during spring and summer to facilitate plant regrowth and refresh the marsh or to create feeding habitat for migrating shorebirds.

Management aims for a 70/30 distribution between cover and open water. To achieve this, certain pools undergo a regular drawdown schedule to replicate natural drought conditions. During these intentionally dry periods, when water levels are lowered, the soils have the opportunity to reoxygenate, promoting the growth of vegetation.

Two sections of the Refuge are under specific management for shorebirds. The smaller of the two, Benning Marsh along the Wildlife Drive, requires more labor-intensive efforts. During the summer, water levels are intentionally kept low to prevent loosestrife germination. Prior to raising the water levels in late summer, the area undergoes plowing to expose bare soil, rapidly transforming it into a mudflat. This results in the growth of vegetation like smartweed and the emergence of numerous macroinvertebrates, providing a food source for the shorebirds, waterfowl, and gulls that gather in this area.

== Public access ==
In addition to providing wildlife habitat, the refuge also provides opportunities for people to observe wildlife. The refuge is open during daylight hours seven days a week.

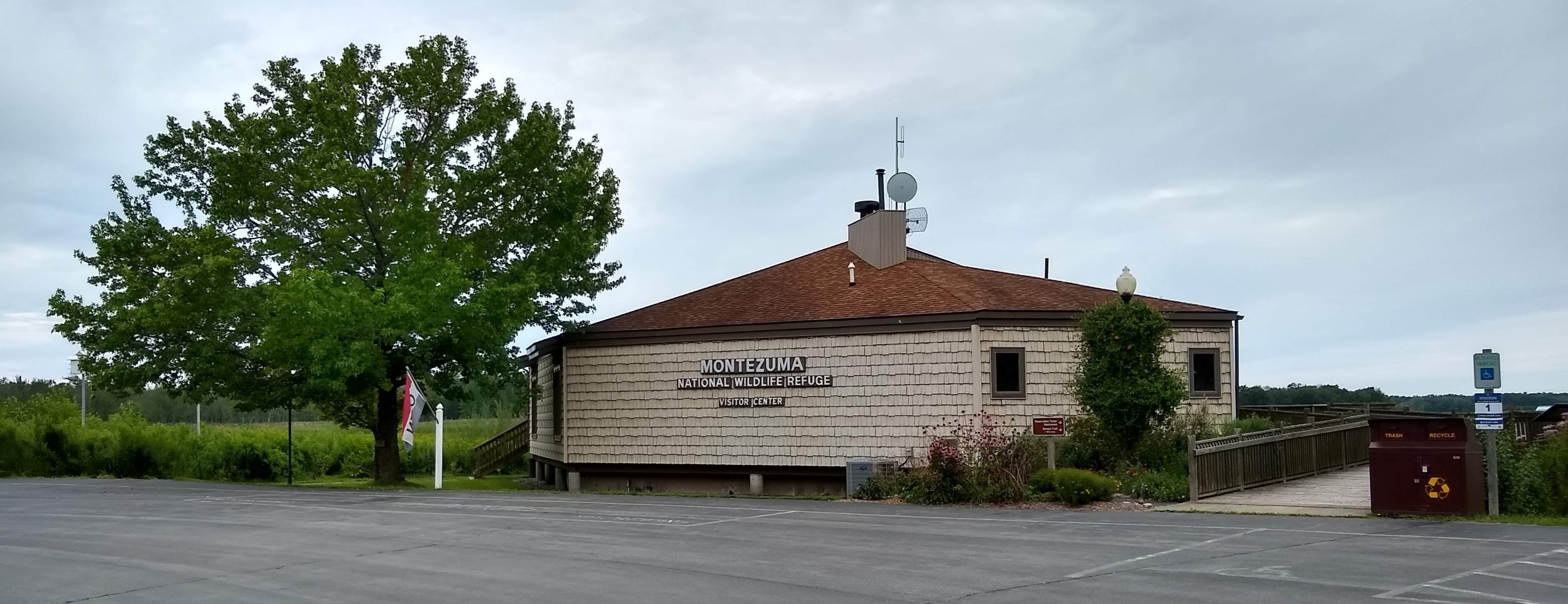
Visitors Center

The 3.5-mile (5.6 km) Wildlife Drive is a one-way auto tour that provides many opportunities to observe and photograph wildlife. The main feature of the drive is the 1,600-acre (6.5 km^{2}) wetland which hosts a rich diversity of waterfowl, waterbirds and other wildlife. The drive is open most of the year with the exception of winter, when the road may not be passable.

A visitor center and gift shop are open from April 1 to December 1 and have educational brochures, exhibits and specimens about the refuge and its wildlife. The two-mile (3.2 km) Esker Brook Trail and the 3/4-mile (1.2 km) Oxbow Trail are available to hikers and walkers and remain accessible throughout the year, though some are off-limits during the white-tailed deer hunting season. There are several platforms and towers throughout the grounds to gain perspective of the landscape.

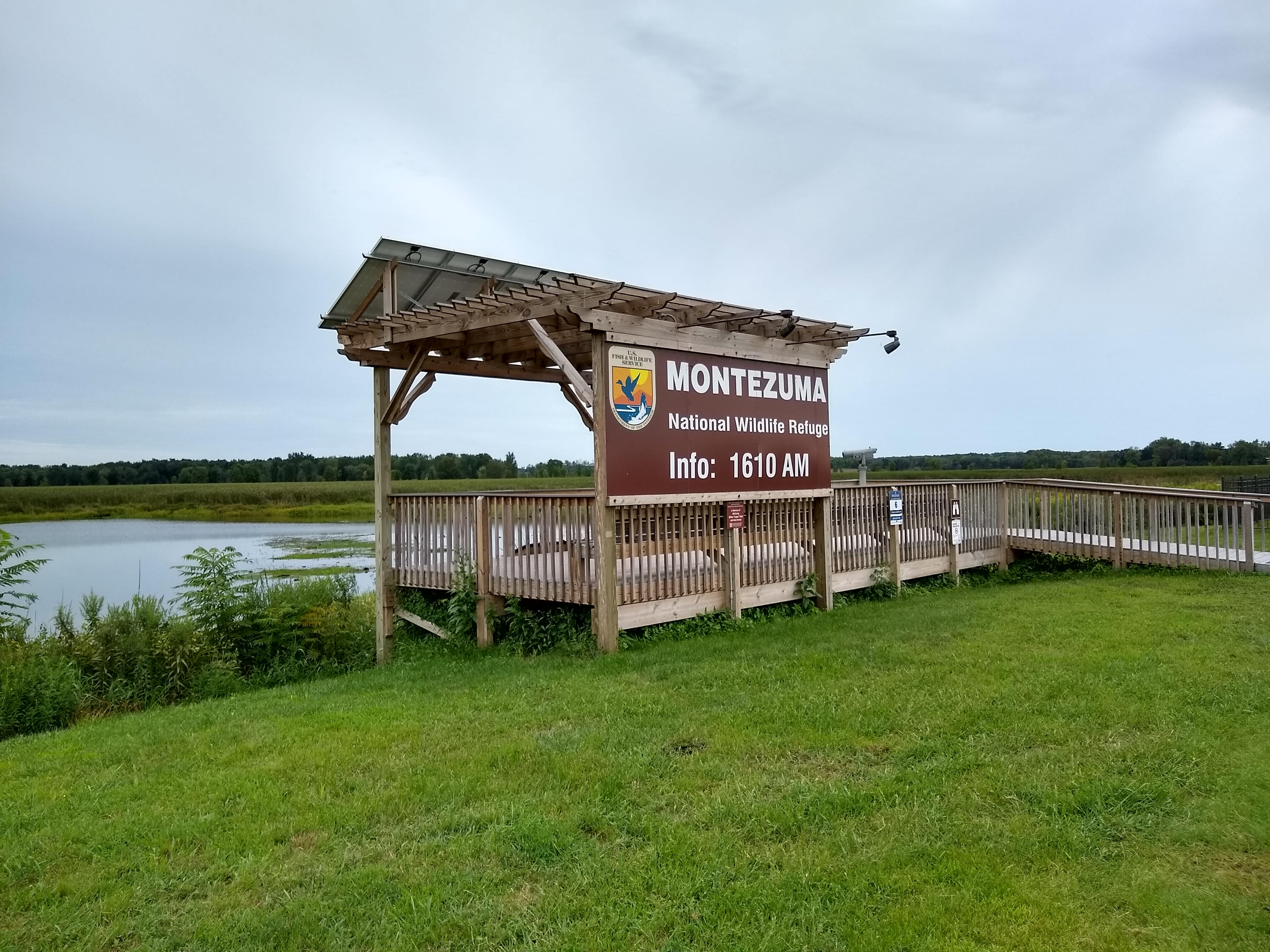
Viewing platform with sign visible from New York State Thruway

The New York State Thruway passes through the north end of the preserve providing passing motorists with a glimpse of the preserve as they speed along the Thruway. A 22-foot steel statue of a bald eagle, dedicated in 2016 to mark the 40th anniversary of the Bald Eagle Restoration program in New York State, is visible from the Thruway.

== See also ==
- List of National Wildlife Refuges
- List of National Natural Landmarks in New York
