= Ridge Road (Western New York) =

Major road dating before the 19th century

- Map of western New York with Ridge Road highlighted in red

Route information
- Maintained by NYSDOT, Monroe and Wayne counties, and several villages and cities
- Length: 121.48 mi (195.50 km)
- History: Established prior to 19th century as Indian trail; rebuilt as road in early 20th century

Major junctions
- West end: Water Street in Lewiston
- Niagara Scenic Parkway in Lewiston; NY 63 near Medina; NY 390 in Greece; NY 590 in Irondequoit; NY 88 in Sodus
- East end: NY 370 near Red Creek

Location
- Country: United States
- State: New York
- Counties: Niagara, Orleans, Monroe, Wayne

Highway system
- New York Highways; Interstate; US; State; Reference; Parkways

Ridge Road is a 121.5-mile (195.5 km) east–west road that traverses four counties in Upstate New York in the United States. The road begins adjacent to the Niagara River at an intersection with Water Street in the village of Lewiston, Niagara County, and passes through several towns, villages, and the city of Rochester before arriving at its eastern terminus at a junction with New York State Route 370 (NY 370) southwest of Red Creek, Wayne County. It is named for the rise atop which the road was built, a mound of sand and gravel that was formed when it was the shoreline of ancient Glacial Lake Iroquois (now Lake Ontario). The ridge is often confused with the nearby Niagara Escarpment, which is much taller, geologic in origin, and lies a few miles to the south.

Most of the road is maintained by either the New York State Department of Transportation as a touring route or by county highway departments as a county road. 70 miles (113 km) of Ridge Road—over half of the road's total length—is part of NY 104, which joins the road outside of Lewiston and leaves it upon crossing the Genesee River in Rochester. From the Monroe–Wayne county line to Red Creek, Ridge Road is a two-lane, mostly county-owned road that parallels the NY 104 super two as both head eastward across Wayne County. Ridge Road is part of the Seaway Trail from its junction with NY 14 east of Sodus to its end at NY 370.

The road dates back to the 18th century when it was a foot trail used by the Algonquian and Iroquois. It developed into a dirt road in the early 19th century, and was modernized in the early 20th century when the state of New York took over the vast majority of the highway. The Porter–Rochester and Webster–Red Creek sections of Ridge Road were designated as part of Route 30, an unsigned legislative route, by 1921, and the latter section became part of the signed NY 3 in 1924. The piece of Route 30 west of Rochester was designated as part of NY 31 by 1926, and NY 31 was rerouted later in the decade to follow Ridge Road west from Porter to Lewiston. In Irondequoit, Ridge Road was unnumbered during the 1920s but designated as part of NY 18 in the early 1930s.

The myriad of designations were mostly replaced with one c. 1935: U.S. Route 104 (US 104). NY 31 and NY 3 were moved off Ridge Road, while NY 18 became concurrent to US 104. Over the next half-century, however, the portion of US 104 (and later NY 104) from the Genesee River eastward was gradually relocated from Ridge Road to new expressways and freeways that were constructed in the vicinity of the old road. A 5.5-mile (8.9 km) section of NY 104's former routing along Ridge Road in Webster was retained as a state highway as part of NY 404; however, most of the old alignment was given to the counties or villages instead.

== Route description ==
=== Lewiston to Rochester ===
The right-of-way of Ridge Road begins on the eastern bank of the Niagara River at the intersection of Center and Water streets in the village of Lewiston. Following Center Street east, the right-of-way meets NY 18F (at this point maintained by Niagara County as the unsigned County Route 907 or CR 907) four blocks later at 4th Street. Here, Center Street changes from a village street to a state-maintained highway as NY 18F joins Center Street east through the village to an interchange with the Robert Moses State Parkway and NY 104 in the shadow of the Niagara Escarpment. NY 18F and the Center Street name both end here, giving way to NY 104 and the Ridge Road moniker. East of this location, Ridge Road and NY 104 parallel the east–west running escarpment to its south as both entities head across western New York.

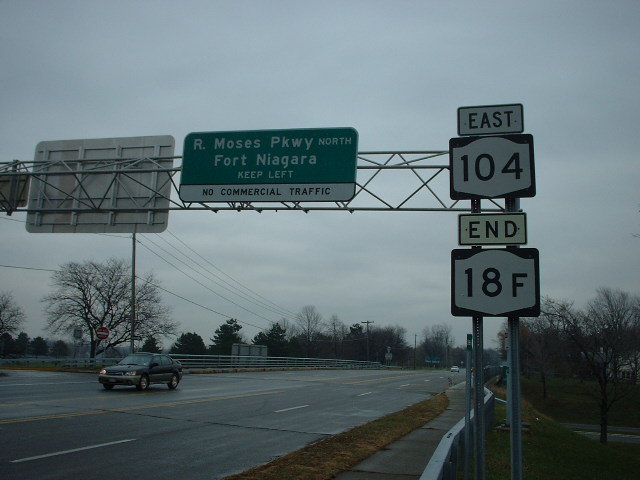
Ridge Road changes designations from NY 18F to NY 104 east of Lewiston.

Most of Ridge Road between Lewiston and the city of Rochester 70 miles (113 km) to the east passes through rural, outlying areas of Niagara, Orleans, and western Monroe counties. While NY 31, a parallel highway 5 miles (8 km) to the south, passes through most of the region's largest communities—including the city of Lockport and the villages of Medina, Albion, and Brockport—Ridge Road and NY 104 bypass them entirely. Instead, the two-lane road passes through only small hamlets built up around junctions between NY 104 and other state routes. This changes in central Monroe County, however, where Ridge Road (known locally as West Ridge Road) is six to nine lanes wide as it serves as the backbone of a large commercial district in the town of Greece. Once in Rochester, West Ridge Road enters areas more residential and industrial in nature, including the sprawling Eastman Business Park near the Genesee River.

=== Rochester area ===
At the Genesee River, NY 104 and West Ridge Road cross the Veterans Memorial Bridge and become an expressway on the east bank of the river. Ridge Road, however, continues to the north of NY 104 as East Ridge Road, which parallels the Keeler Street Expressway as both travel through the area. The latter begins at St. Paul Street a short distance south of Seneca Park Zoo and heads eastward as a city-maintained street, carrying NY 104 Truck through a residential section of the city. East Ridge Road crosses into the town of Irondequoit just east of Seneca Avenue, at which point it becomes county-maintained as CR 241. NY 104 Truck leaves to the south at Hudson Avenue, the first major intersection East Ridge Road has in Irondequoit.

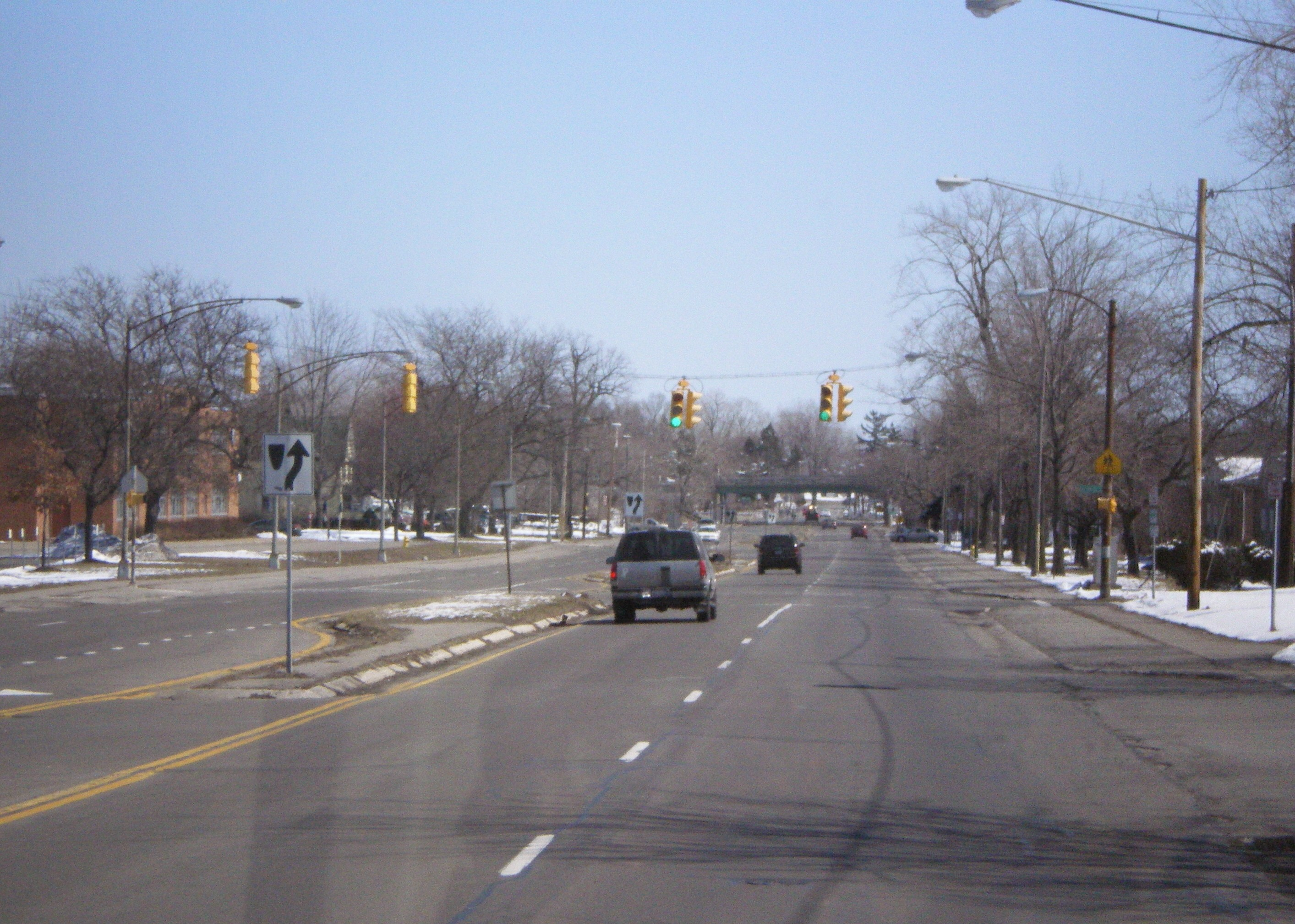
Approaching NY 590 on East Ridge Road eastbound

Like in Greece, the Irondequoit portion of Ridge Road is lined with businesses ranging from big-box stores to small establishments. The road's status as an anchor for the town's economy is supported by the presence of a Wal-Mart supercenter on Hudson Avenue between NY 104 and East Ridge Road and Skyview on the Ridge, formerly known as both the Irondequoit Mall and Medley Center, located on East Ridge Road between North Goodman Street and Culver Road. Past Culver Road, the look along the four-lane East Ridge Road changes slightly as it gains a median while the surrounding neighborhood begins to shift from commercial to residential—a change ushered in by the presence of Eastridge High School. The divided highway, as well as CR 241, come to an end at NY 590 exit 11, the northernmost exit on the expressway. The exit is unorthodox in that the exit is bordered on both sides by NY 104, which is forced to parallel NY 590 for a short distance due to the composition of the area.

After passing over NY 104 westbound, under NY 590 and over NY 104 eastbound, East Ridge Road becomes a nondescript residential street as it enters the Irondequoit neighborhood of Newport. The East Ridge Road name ends at a junction with Bay Shore Boulevard—the only through-traffic road that East Ridge Road intersects east of NY 590—however, the street continues eastward as Binnacle Point to a cul-de-sac on a plateau overlooking Irondequoit Bay. Ridge Road itself does not traverse Irondequoit Bay; this task is accomplished by NY 404 at the southern tip of the bay, NY 104 via the Irondequoit Bay Bridge, and Culver and Lake Roads at the mouth of the bay via the Irondequoit Bay Outlet Bridge, a seasonal swing bridge that is open to traffic during the winter months only. This gap in Ridge Road is the only major discontinuity along its length.

=== Webster to Sodus ===
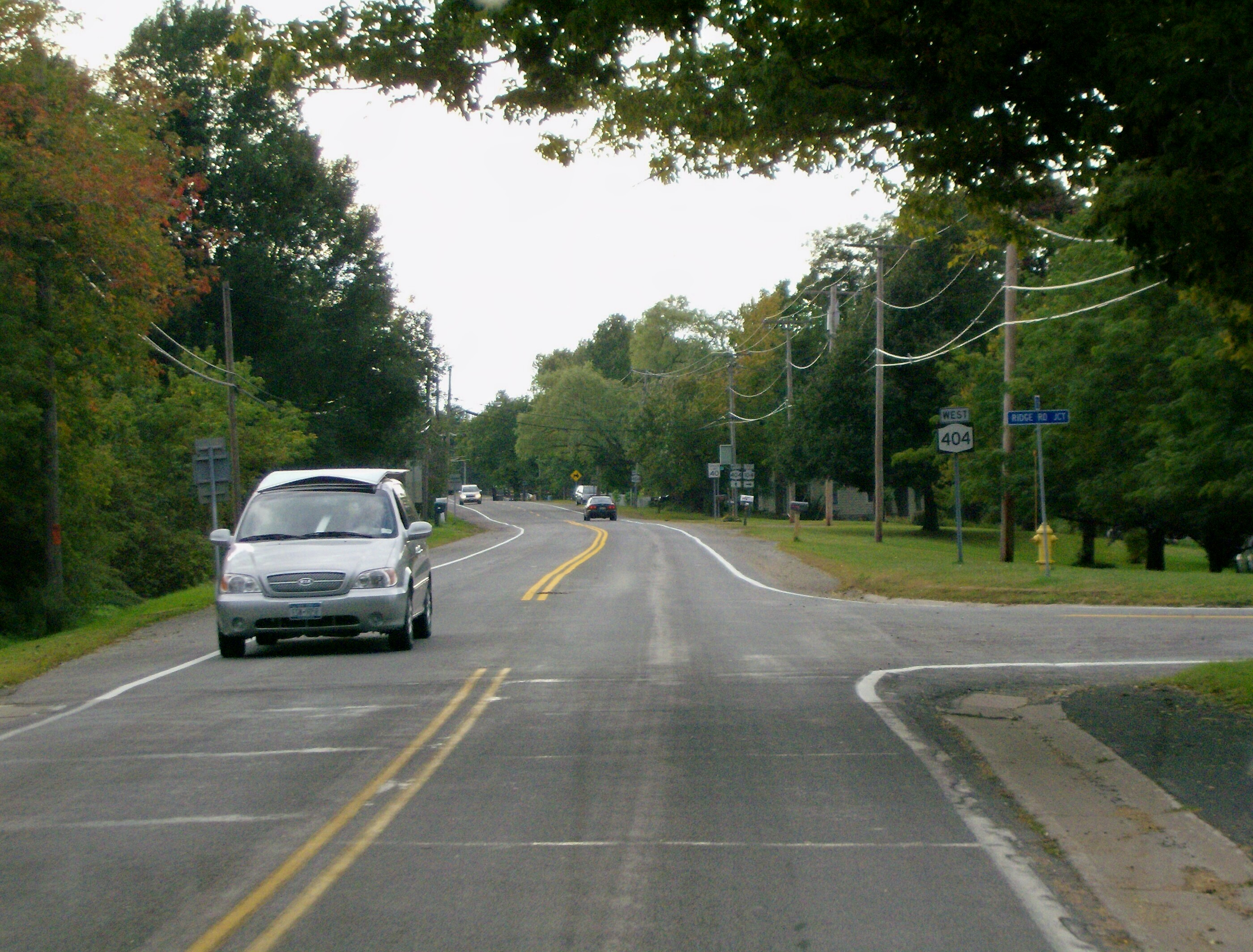
NY 404 leaves Ridge Road at this intersection with Ridge Road Junction, a connector leading to NY 104.

Directly across the bay in the town of Webster, Ridge Road resumes at an intersection with Glen Edith Drive and Bay Road in an area of the town known as West Webster. Like East Ridge Road in the city of Rochester, this stretch of Ridge Road is locally maintained. State maintenance resumes one mile (1.6 km) to the east as Ridge Road merges with Empire Boulevard, which carries NY 404 into Webster from Penfield and Irondequoit. NY 404 takes on the Ridge Road name and heads east through the village of Webster to an intersection 0.5 miles (0.8 km) west of the Wayne County. Here, NY 404 vacates Ridge Road to follow Ridge Road Junction northeasterly down the escarpment—which Ridge Road runs on the edge of throughout most of its alignment in Webster—to NY 104. Ridge Road, in the meantime, becomes locally maintained for its remaining half-mile in Monroe County.

Upon crossing the county line, Ridge Road becomes county-maintained as CR 103. The route heads along the top of the escarpment, passing by a smattering of homes, while NY 104—visible from Ridge Road for most of the latter's routing through the town of Ontario—serves a line of businesses at the escarpment's base. The two roads, which run parallel to one another between the village of Webster and Ontario Center, begin to separate at NY 350 in Ontario Center. East of the hamlet, both Ridge Road and NY 104 enter a less-developed area of the county consisting of forests along NY 104 and fields adjacent to Ridge Road. Across the town line in Williamson, Ridge Road and NY 104 pass along opposite ends of Spencer Speedway prior to entering the hamlet of Williamson. Here, Ridge Road takes on the name Main Street as it passes east–west through the community and intersects NY 21 0.6 miles (1.0 km) south of where it ends at NY 104.

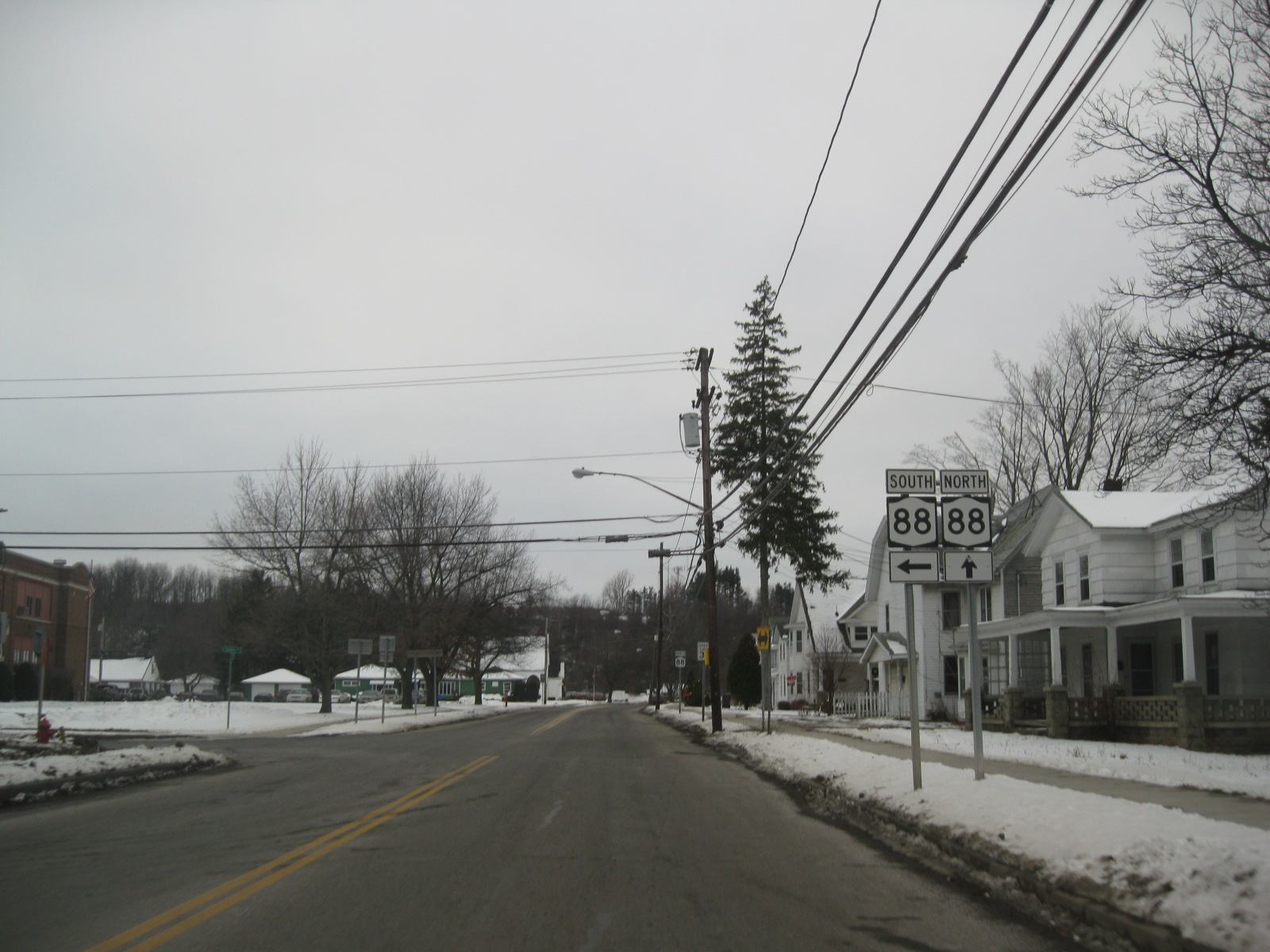
NY 88 leaves Main Street southbound and joins it northbound at the intersection of Carlton and Main streets, shown above.

The Ridge Road name returns outside the community; however, the fields do not as the road initially passes by a steady stream of homes on both sides of the highway. It briefly veers northward outside of Williamson, but returns to a more easterly routing ahead of East Townline Road and the Sodus town line. It is at the latter that the amount of development along Ridge Road finally decreases, giving way to slightly more open areas. In western Sodus, Ridge Road and NY 104 follow parallel, slightly northeasterly alignments that eventually lead both to the village of Sodus. Prior to reaching the village, both highways pass by Williamson–Sodus Airport, a local airport situated in between the two roads. Ridge Road continues on to the village, where it meets NY 88—which ends a short distance northwest of this point at NY 104—just west of the village limits. At this point, CR 103 ends while Ridge Road heads eastward, becoming state-maintained again as it follows NY 88 into Sodus.

Once inside the Sodus village limits, the name of the road changes to West Main Street. NY 88 remains on Main Street for two blocks to Carlton Street, at which point it turns southward onto Carlton Street and leaves Main Street as an unnumbered, village-maintained highway. The street continues eastward through the residential western portion of Sodus to the village's business district, where it intersects Maple Avenue and becomes East Main Street. It splits into two roads a block later: the upper road, which carries the East Main Street name and becomes known as Old Ridge Road outside of the village, climbs up the side of the escarpment while the lower road, State Street, runs along the base of the ridge. State Street itself splits two blocks later near a grade crossing with the Ontario Midland Railroad, with the eastern fork carrying the Ridge Road name.

=== East of Sodus ===
Outside of Sodus, Ridge Road becomes CR 143 and parallels the Ontario Midland Railroad for just under 1 mile (1.6 km) before crossing the railroad at an oblique angle and intersecting NY 104. By crossing NY 104 here, Ridge Road moves to the north side of NY 104 for the first time since the start of East Ridge Road in Rochester and only the second time since the beginning of the road in Lewiston. Ridge Road runs parallel to NY 104 for a considerable distance through sparsely populated areas of the town of Sodus to the hamlet of Alton, where Ridge Road intersects NY 14 in its center. The state highway, which enters Alton from the north as part of the Seaway Trail, travels east for 150 yards (137 m) along Ridge Road before resuming its trek southward toward North Rose. The overlap creates a small gap in CR 143, which resumes at the east end of the concurrency.

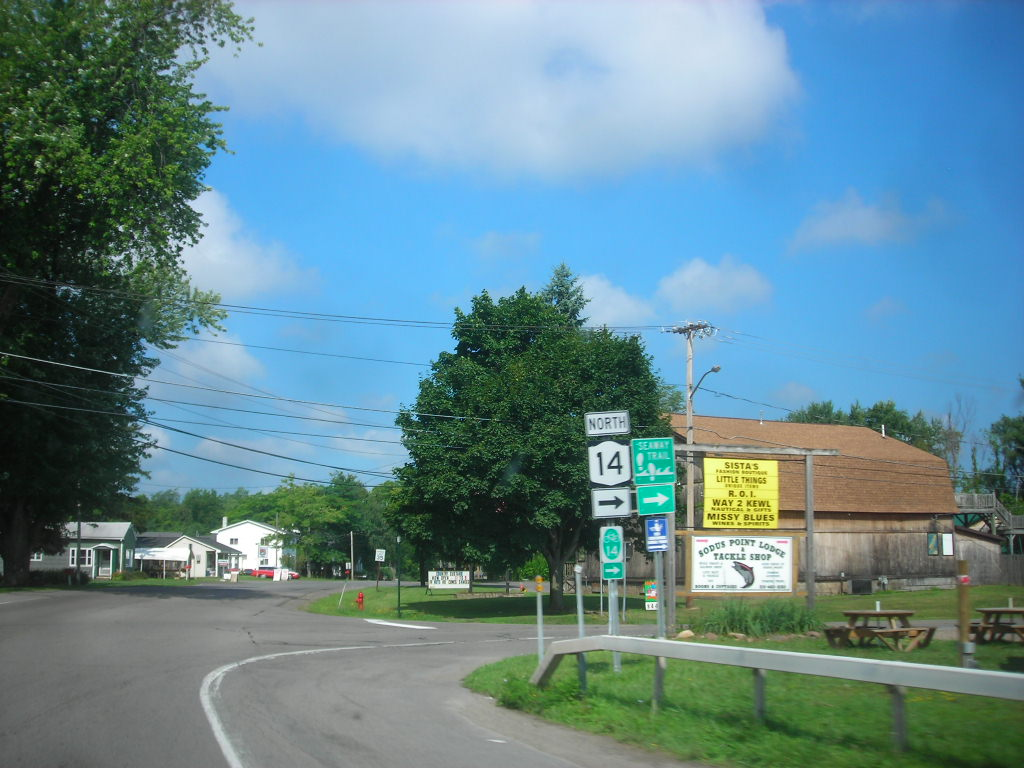
Ridge Road at NY 14 northbound in Alton. Ridge Road is part of the Seaway Trail from this point eastward.

While NY 14 leaves Alton to the south, the Seaway Trail follows Ridge Road as the latter breaks from NY 104 and takes a more northerly alignment into the town of Huron than the super two highway. Ridge Road heads eastward and northeastward across open fields to Sodus Bay, which the road crosses near its southern tip. East of the bay, Ridge Road passes through the small community of Resort before heading almost due eastward through extremely rural sections of Huron. About 4.5 miles (7.2 km) east of Sodus Bay, Ridge Road meets Lummisville Road (CR 155) at a junction northwest of the village of Wolcott. Ridge Road takes on Lummisville Road's northwest–southeasterly alignment and heads into Wolcott, losing the CR 143 designation and becoming the locally maintained West Main Street.

In Wolcott, the path of Ridge Road is known by several names as it traverses the industrial western half of the community—based around a spur of the Ontario Midland Railroad—and its residential eastern portion. It remains West Main Street until New Hartford Street, at which point it becomes just Main Street. One block later, Main Street splits into East Main Street and Mill Street, with Ridge Road following the latter northeast across Wolcott Creek. On the opposite bank of the creek, Mill Street meets Auburn Street, formerly the northernmost part of NY 89, and changes names one last time to Oswego Street. The street leaves Wolcott village on an easterly routing, becoming CR 163 and Ridge Road at the eastern village line.

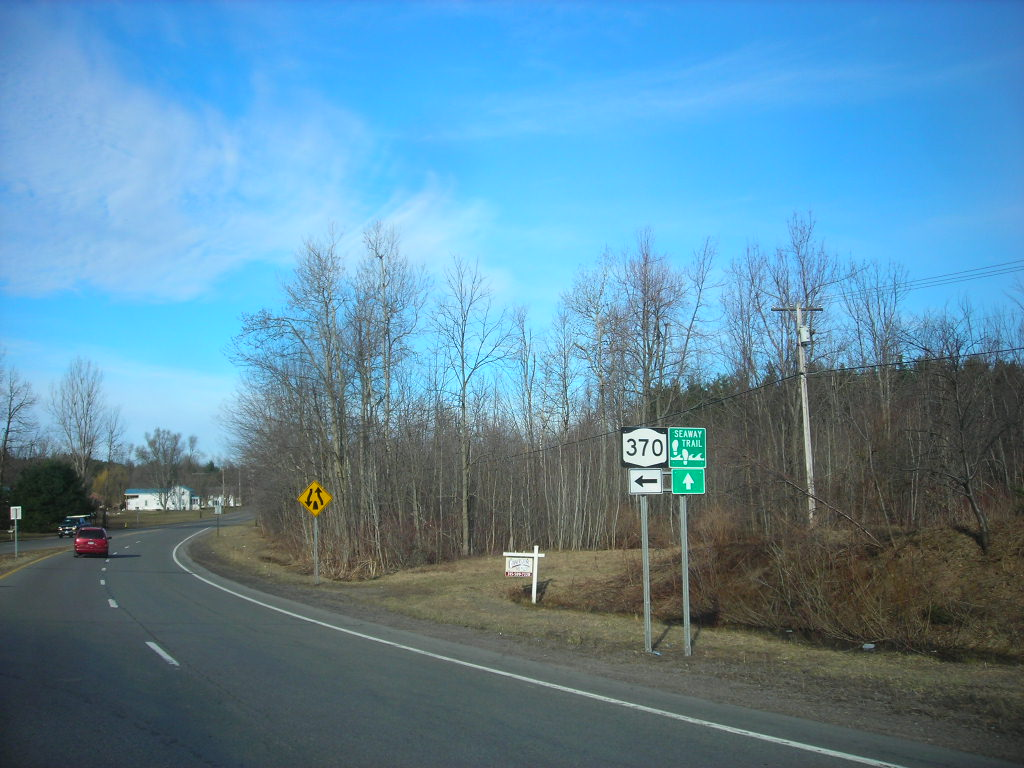
East end of Ridge Road at NY 370

Due east of Wolcott, Ridge Road intersects NY 104 for the last time in a heavily wooded area. On the other side of the super two, Ridge Road continues eastward for 2 miles (3.2 km) through a mostly undeveloped area of the town of Wolcott to an intersection with NY 370, where Ridge Road and CR 163 both terminate about 2 miles (3.2 km) southwest of the village of Red Creek. The right-of-way of Ridge Road continues northeastward as NY 370 westbound, and NY 370 and NY 104A carry the Seaway Trail into Red Creek.

== History ==
=== Origins and early designations ===
The natural rise in the otherwise flat plains of northern Western New York was formed when sand and gravel were deposited at the shore of Glacial Lake Iroquois. This precursor to Lake Ontario, formed while the St. Lawrence River outlet was blocked by glacial ice, had a level about 150 feet (50 m) higher than the modern lake, which meant its southern shoreline was approximately 6 to 8 miles (10 to 13 km) south of the modern shore.

This ridge became the site of a pre-19th century trail carved out and used by the Algonquian and Iroquois. The path, known as the East and West Indian Trail, was initially just 15 inches (38 cm) wide; however, it was gradually widened into a dirt road in the late 18th and early 19th centuries. One of the first areas to be improved was a 12-mile (19 km) section leading west from the Genesee River, which was widened by 1800. The trail was made passable from the Genesee River west to Lewiston in 1812; however, it was still a narrow, crude path with no bridges. In 1816, the state of New York paid $5,000 (equivalent to $92,637 in 2024) to make the trail passable by wagons. By 1820, the trail was being used by daily stagecoaches. The trail was the main mode of transportation between the Genesee River and points west until the establishment of the Erie Canal in 1825, and later, railroads.

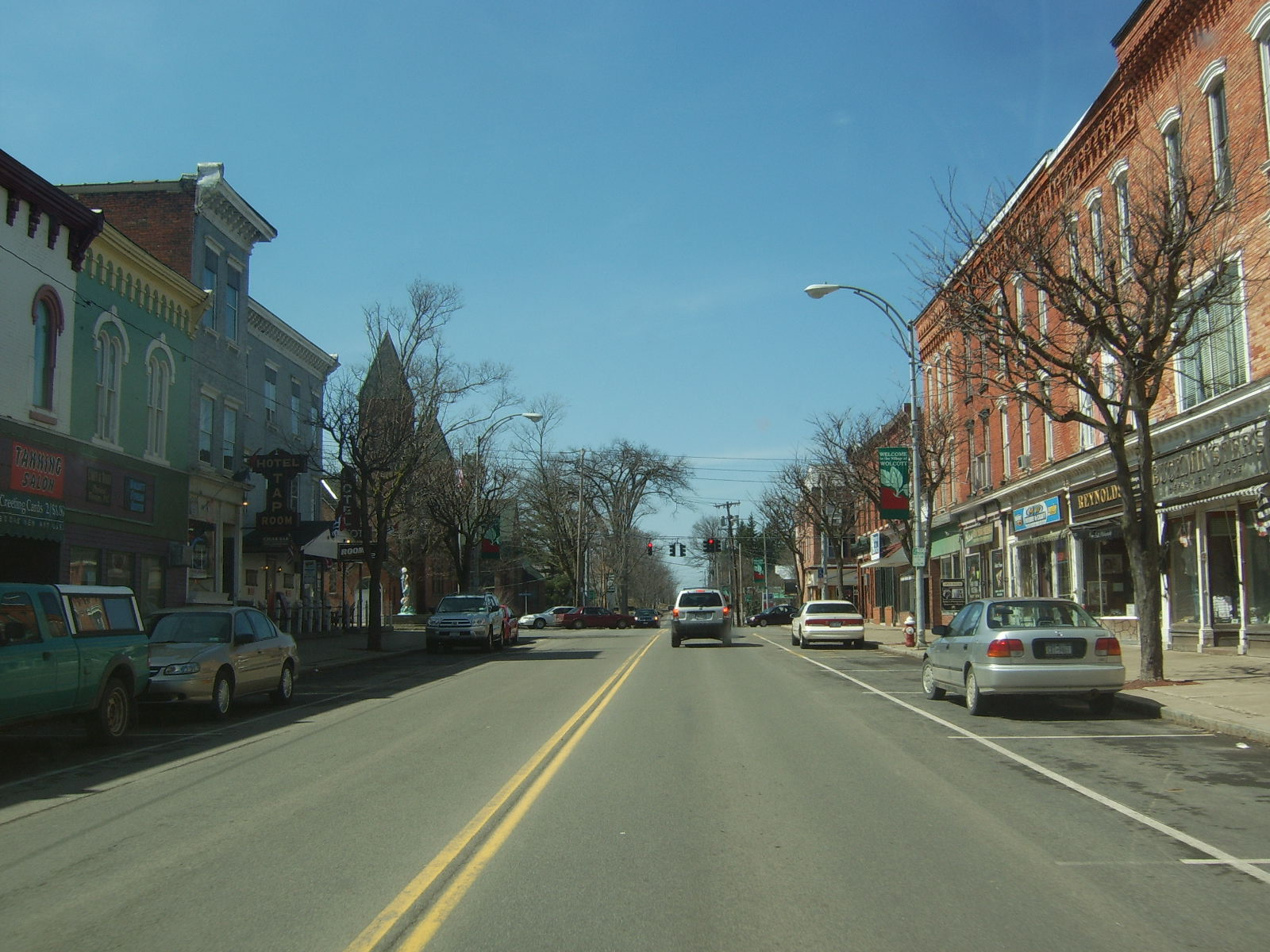
East Main Street (Ridge Road) in the village of Wolcott

It was not until the early 1900s that the road saw major improvements, thanks to the increasing usage of the automobile. In 1908, the New York State Legislature established Route 30, an unsigned legislative route extending from Niagara Falls, Niagara County in the southwest to Rouses Point, Clinton County, in the northeast. Two sections of Ridge Road—from Porter (modern NY 429) to Ridgeway (NY 63) and from Rochester to Red Creek—were included as part of Route 30 at this time. Another section, from Ridgeway to the Orleans–Monroe county line, was added to Route 30's definition in 1914 as a spur route. On March 1, 1921, the mainline of Route 30 was realigned to follow Ridge Road between Ridgeway and the Rochester city line at Greece.

When the first set of posted routes in New York were assigned in 1924, the segment of Route 30 from Rochester to Red Creek became part of NY 3. By 1926, all of legislative Route 30 west of Rochester was designated as part of NY 31. At the time, the entirety of Ridge Road outside of the city of Rochester was state-maintained; however, the piece west of Porter and the section in Irondequoit between the Genesee River and Irondequoit Bay were both unnumbered. The former became part of a realigned NY 31 in the late 1920s, while the latter became part of an extended NY 18 c. 1931 following the completion of the Veterans Memorial Bridge over the Genesee River.

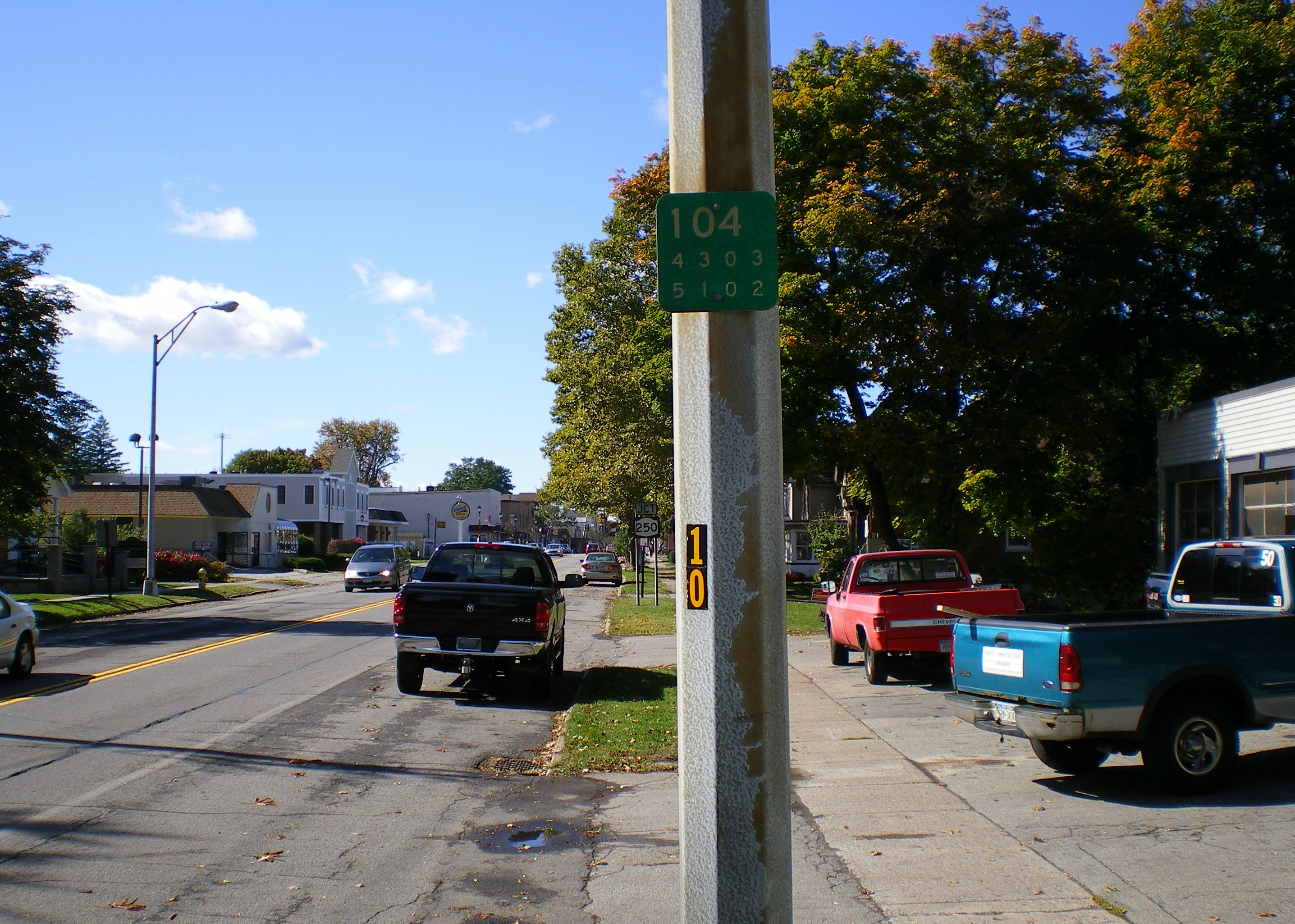
Reference marker for NY 104 on NY 404 (Ridge Road) in Webster

US 104 was assigned across Upstate New York c. 1935, extending from Niagara Falls to Maple View via Lewiston, Rochester, and Oswego. The new US route used the entirety of Ridge Road from Lewiston to Red Creek, save for small portions in and around the city of Rochester; as a result, NY 31 was shifted south onto most of its modern alignment while NY 3 was rerouted south of Watertown to follow what had been NY 3D. When US 104 was first assigned, it dipped south to serve downtown Rochester instead of bypassing it to the north. The route left Ridge Road at Lake Avenue and rejoined it at the junction of Empire Boulevard and Ridge Road in Webster. It was rerouted c. 1937 to continue east over the Veterans Memorial Bridge into Irondequoit, overlapping with NY 18 to the junction of East Ridge and Culver roads.

=== Construction of expressways ===
Beginning in the 1940s, US 104 began to be moved from Ridge Road to expressways and super two highways constructed to bypass the numerous communities that had developed along Ridge Road east of Rochester. The first portion of the super two, extending from the Monroe–Wayne county line at Union Hill to west of Sodus, was opened to traffic in the mid-1940s. An extension of the highway around Sodus to NY 414 in Huron was built in the mid-1960s, resulting in US 104 being temporarily routed on Lake Bluff Road in between the end of the super two and Ridge Road. The remainder of the super two between Huron and Red Creek was finished in the early 1970s. In place of US 104, Ridge Road in Wayne County was designated as CR 103 west of NY 88, CR 143 between Sodus and Wolcott, and CR 163 from Wolcott to NY 370.

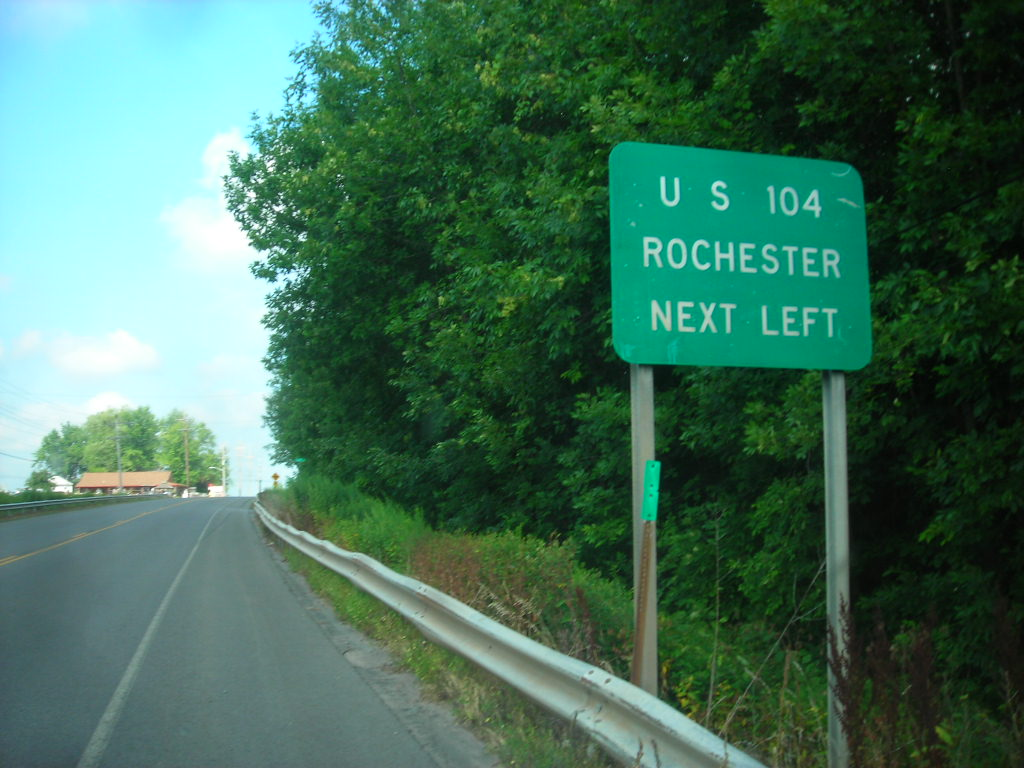
Old signage for US 104 on Ridge Road east of Lake Bluff Road in Huron, reflecting US 104's temporary routing along the latter during the 1960s and 1970s.

Similar conversion projects were also conducted elsewhere. In Irondequoit, the portion of the Sea Breeze Expressway (now NY 590) from Empire Boulevard to Culver Road opened in the late 1950s. US 104 and NY 18 were extended eastward along East Ridge Road to meet the expressway at what is now exit 11. To the southwest, the Keeler Street Expressway was built across Irondequoit in the mid-1960s and fully opened to traffic in late 1969. US 104 was moved from East Ridge Road to the expressway at that time, while NY 18 remained on East Ridge Road until it was truncated to its current eastern terminus in Rochester c. 1973. East Ridge Road subsequently became CR 241.

The first segment of an eastward extension of the Keeler Street Expressway, named the Irondequoit–Wayne County Expressway, opened c. 1971 between the Sea Breeze Expressway and Five Mile Line Road. In between, US 104 crossed Irondequoit Bay by way of the Irondequoit Bay Bridge. US 104's former surface alignment between NY 47 and Five Mile Line Road was redesignated NY 404 while US 104 was temporarily realigned onto Five Mile Line Road to travel between the expressway and Ridge Road. US 104 was redesignated as NY 104 by the following year. NY 404 was gradually extended eastward along Ridge Road as new sections of the freeway opened to traffic. By 1978, it was extended to NY 250 in Webster after NY 104 was realigned onto the newly completed frontage roads between Five Mile Line Road and NY 250. NY 404 was extended to its current terminus in the early 1980s following the completion of the freeway from NY 250 to the Wayne County line in the late 1970s and the construction of the main carriageway of NY 104 between Five Mile Line Road and NY 250 in the early 1980s.

== Major intersections ==
Ridge Road is part of NY 18F in Lewiston, NY 104 from Lewiston east to the Genesee River in Rochester, and NY 404 in Webster. Intersections along those segments of Ridge Road can be found in the articles on those routes.

County	Location	mi	km	Destinations	Notes
Niagara	Village of Lewiston	0.00	0.00	Water Street	
Niagara	Village of Lewiston	0.22	0.35	NY 18F north (CR 907 / 4th Street)	NY 18F joins Ridge Road eastbound and leaves westbound
NY 18F and NY 104 follow Ridge Road for 76.26 miles (122.73 km) between Lewiston and Rochester
Monroe	Rochester	76.48	123.08	St. Paul Street	Begin East Ridge Road eastbound and West Ridge Road westbound (via St. Paul Street)
Monroe	Rochester–Irondequoit city/town line	77.04	123.98	Western terminus of CR 241	
Monroe	Irondequoit	79.44	127.85	Culver Road (CR 120)	Formerly part of US 104 (south) and NY 18 (north)
Monroe	Irondequoit	80.15	128.99	NY 590	Exit 11 (NY 590); eastern terminus of CR 241
Monroe	Irondequoit	80.35	129.31	Dead end at cul-de-sac	
Monroe	Irondequoit Bay; gap in roadway				
Monroe	Town of Webster	80.35	129.31	Bay Road (CR 16)	
Monroe	Town of Webster	81.43	131.05	NY 404 west	NY 404 joins Ridge Road eastbound and leaves westbound
Monroe	Town of Webster	NY 404 follows Ridge Road for 5.60 miles (9.01 km) through the village of Webster and the immediate vicinity			
Monroe	Town of Webster	87.03	140.06	NY 404 east	NY 404 leaves Ridge Road eastbound and joins westbound
Monroe–Wayne county line	Webster–Ontario town line	87.52	140.85	County Line Road (CR 2)	Western terminus of CR 103
Wayne	Ontario			NY 350	
Wayne	Ontario	92.15	148.30	Knickerbocker Road (CR 108)	
Wayne	Ontario	92.32	148.57	Furnace Road (CR 110)	
Wayne	Ontario–Williamson town line	93.93	151.17	Arbor Road (CR 210)	
Wayne	Williamson			NY 21	
Wayne	Williamson	99.80	160.61	Townline Road (CR 118 / CR 218)	
Wayne	Town of Sodus	103.60	166.73	NY 88 north	Eastern terminus of CR 103; NY 88 joins Ridge Road eastbound and leaves westbound
Wayne	Village of Sodus	104.12	167.56	NY 88 south	NY 88 leaves Ridge Road eastbound and joins westbound
Wayne	Sodus–Sodus village/town line	104.85	168.74	Western terminus of CR 143	
Wayne	Town of Sodus	105.89	170.41	NY 104	
Wayne	Town of Sodus	107.20	172.52	South Geneva Road (CR 140 / CR 240)	
Wayne	Town of Sodus	108.91	175.27	NY 14 north	NY 14 joins Ridge Road eastbound and leaves westbound
Wayne	Town of Sodus	108.99	175.40	NY 14 south	NY 14 leaves Ridge Road eastbound and joins westbound
Wayne	Huron	112.71	181.39	Lake Bluff Road (CR 154 / CR 254)	Former northern terminus of NY 414
Wayne	Huron–Wolcott town/village line	117.01	188.31	Eastern terminus of CR 143	
Wayne	Village of Wolcott			Auburn Street	Former northern terminus of NY 89
Wayne	Wolcott–Wolcott village/town line	118.39	190.53	Western terminus of CR 163	
Wayne	Town of Wolcott			NY 104	
Wayne	Town of Wolcott	121.48	195.50	NY 370	Eastern terminus of CR 163; roadway continues east as NY 370
1.000 mi = 1.609 km; 1.000 km = 0.621 mi

== See also ==
- List of county routes in Monroe County, New York
- List of county routes in Wayne County, New York
