= List of highways numbered 318 =

The following highways are numbered 318:

== Canada ==
- Nova Scotia Route 318
- Prince Edward Island Route 318
- Saskatchewan Highway 318

== China ==
- China National Highway 318

== Costa Rica ==
- National Route 318

== Japan ==
- Japan National Route 318

== United States ==
- Arkansas Highway 318
- Colorado State Highway 318
- Connecticut Route 318
- Florida:
  - Florida State Road 318 (former)
  - County Road 318, several roads in Florida
- Georgia State Route 318 (former)
- Indiana State Road 318 (former)
- Louisiana Highway 318
- Maryland Route 318
- Minnesota State Highway 318 (former)
- Montana Secondary Highway 318
- Nevada State Route 318
- New York:
  - New York State Route 318
  - County Route 318 (Wayne County, New York)
- Ohio State Route 318 (former)
- Pennsylvania Route 318
- Tennessee State Route 318
- Texas:
  - Texas State Highway 318 (former)
  - Farm to Market Road 318
- Utah State Route 318
- Virginia State Route 318
- Wyoming Highway 318

Other areas:

- Puerto Rico Highway 318
- U.S. Virgin Islands Highway 318

Preceded by 317	Lists of highways 318	Succeeded by 319
