= List of county routes in Wayne County, New York =

County routes in Wayne County, New York, are only posted on street blade signs. Each route number is the product of two different numbering systems, both county-wide in nature. The last two digits of the route number serve as a road's base designation and are assigned sequentially from the Monroe County line in the west to the Cayuga County line in the east and from the Lake Ontario shoreline in the north to the Ontario and Seneca county lines in the south. The first digit of each route's designation indicates where the route is located: routes numbered in the 100s are north of Ridge Road; routes in the 200s are south of Ridge Road and north of New York State Route 31 (NY 31); and routes in the 300s are south of NY 31. If a road crosses either of those highways, the first digit of the route's number changes to reflect the road's location in the latter numbering grid.

Routes ending in an even number run from north to south; routes with an odd designation travel from east to west.

== Routes 100–199 ==
Route	Length (mi)	Length (km)	From	Via	To	Notes
CR 100	1.63	2.62	Monroe County line (becomes CR 2)	County Line Road in Ontario	CR 101	
CR 101	19.35	31.14	CR 100 at Monroe County line in Ontario (becomes CR 1)	Lake Road	Sodus Point village line in Sodus	
CR 102	3.20	5.15	CR 103	Lakeside Road in Ontario	CR 101	
CR 103	15.75	25.35	Monroe County line in Ontario	Ridge Road	NY 88 in Sodus	Former routing of US 104
CR 108	3.57	5.75	CR 103	Knickerbocker Road in Ontario	CR 101	
CR 109	0.36	0.58	CR 108	Railroad Street in Ontario	CR 110	
CR 110	2.36	3.80	CR 103	Furnace Road in Ontario	Trimble Road	
CR 112	2.73	4.39	CR 113	Stoney Lonesome Road in Williamson	CR 101	
CR 113	0.58	0.93	CR 112	Kenyon and Salmon Creek roads in Williamson	CR 115	
CR 115	0.84	1.35	CR 113	Woods Road in Williamson	CR 116	
CR 116	0.55	0.89	NY 104	Tuckahoe Road in Williamson	CR 115	
CR 117	0.75	1.21	CR 116	Railroad Avenue in Williamson	CR 120	
CR 118	3.67	5.91	CR 103 / CR 218	Town Line Road in Williamson	CR 101	
CR 120	3.26	5.25	NY 21 / NY 104	Lake Avenue and Hamilton Street in Williamson	CR 101	Formerly part of NY 21
CR 134	1.39	2.24	Sodus village line	Maple Avenue in Sodus	CR 101	
CR 140	3.22	5.18	CR 143 / CR 240	North Geneva Road in Sodus	CR 101	
CR 143	12.21	19.65	Sodus village line in Sodus	Ridge Road	Wolcott village line in Huron	Former routing of US 104; discontinuous at NY 14
CR 153	0.16	0.26	West end of bridge	Leroy Island Road in Huron	East end of bridge	Comprises bridge to Leroy Island in Sodus Bay
CR 154	4.32	6.95	CR 143 / CR 254	Lake Bluff Road in Huron	End of county maintenance	
CR 155	4.73	7.61	CR 154	Lummisville Road in Huron	CR 143	
CR 156	2.78	4.47	CR 143 / CR 256	North Huron Road in Huron	Slaght Road	
CR 158	3.63	5.84	CR 155	Dutch Street in Huron	Wright Road	
CR 160	4.25	6.84	Wolcott village line in Wolcott	West Port Bay Road	Loon Point Road in Huron	
CR 161	1.56	2.51	CR 160	Furnace Road in Wolcott	CR 164 / CR 165	
CR 162	5.32	8.56	Wolcott village line	East Port Bay Road in Wolcott	Dead end at Lake Ontario	
CR 163	3.09	4.97	Wolcott village line	Ridge Road in Wolcott	NY 370	Former routing of US 104
CR 164	1.80	2.90	Wolcott village line	Wadsworth Road in Wolcott	CR 161 / CR 165	
CR 165	3.37	5.42	CR 161 / CR 164	Red Creek Road in Wolcott	Red Creek village line	
CR 166	2.10	3.38	CR 165	Hapeman Road in Wolcott	CR 168	
CR 167	3.53	5.68	CR 165	Chapmans Corners Road in Wolcott	NY 104A	
CR 168	0.71	1.14	CR 166	Broadway Road in Wolcott	Younglove Road	
CR 170	2.15	3.46	Red Creek village line	Hawley Road in Wolcott	CR 167	

== Routes 200–299 ==
Route	Length (mi)	Length (km)	From	Via	To	Notes
CR 200	2.97	4.78	CR 201 / CR 202 in Walworth	North Lincoln Road	NY 104 in Ontario	
CR 201	4.36	7.02	Monroe County line (becomes CR 11)	Plank Road in Walworth	NY 350	
CR 202	1.40	2.25	NY 286 / CR 203 / CR 204	South Lincoln Road in Walworth	CR 200 / CR 201	
CR 203	4.33	6.97	Monroe County line	Atlantic Avenue in Walworth	NY 350	Entire length overlaps with NY 286
CR 204 (1)	3.45	5.55	CR 206A in Macedon	West Walworth Road	NY 441 in Walworth	
CR 204 (2)	2.03	3.27	NY 441	West Walworth Road in Walworth	NY 286 / CR 202 / CR 203	Designated NY 388 from c. 1931 to early 1940s
CR 205	1.00	1.61	NY 350 / NY 441	Penfield–Walworth Road in Walworth	CR 207 / CR 208	
CR 205A	3.65	5.87	NY 441 in Walworth	Gananda Parkway	Eddy Road in Macedon	
CR 206	1.50	2.41	NY 31 / CR 306	North Wayneport Road in Macedon	CR 206A	
CR 206A	0.50	0.80	CR 206	Quaker Road in Macedon	CR 204	
CR 207	4.40	7.08	CR 205 / CR 208 in Walworth	Walworth–Marion Road and Buffalo Street	CR 216 in Marion	
CR 208	5.69	9.16	NY 31 in Macedon	Walworth Road	CR 205 / CR 207 in Walworth	
CR 209	3.22	5.18	NY 350 in Macedon	Macedon Center Road	CR 210 in Palmyra	
CR 210	5.29	8.51	Palmyra village line in Palmyra	Maple Avenue	CR 207 in Marion	
CR 212	5.19	8.35	CR 214 in Marion	Ridge Chapel Road	CR 103 in Williamson	
CR 214	1.30	2.09	CR 207	Dean Road in Marion	CR 212	
CR 215	2.35	3.78	CR 218 in Marion	Owls Nest Road	CR 228 / CR 229 in Sodus	
CR 216	1.63	2.62	NY 21	Main Street in Marion	NY 21	Former routing of NY 21
CR 217	2.52	4.06	CR 218 in Marion	Skinner Road	CR 228 in Arcadia	
CR 218	6.55	10.54	CR 216 in Marion	Marion–East Williamson Road	CR 103 / CR 118 in Williamson	
CR 219	2.27	3.65	CR 220	Smith Road in Marion	CR 226 at White Road	
CR 220	3.91	6.29	CR 221 / CR 222 in Palmyra	Newark–Marion Road	CR 216 in Marion	
CR 221	3.99	6.42	CR 220 / CR 222 in Palmyra	Hydesville Road	NY 88 in Arcadia	
CR 222	3.02	4.86	CR 223 in Palmyra	Lyon Road	CR 219 in Marion	
CR 223	4.00	6.44	NY 21	North Creek Road in Palmyra	CR 221	
CR 224	3.55	5.71	NY 31 in Arcadia	Whitbeck and Tellier roads	CR 223 in Palmyra	
CR 225	2.91	4.68	CR 224 in Palmyra	Tellier Road	Newark village line in Arcadia	
CR 226	4.62	7.44	CR 221 in Arcadia	Sandhill Road	CR 219 at White Road in Marion	
CR 228	7.27	11.70	CR 221 in Arcadia	Minsteed Road	CR 215 / CR 229 in Sodus	
CR 229	4.40	7.08	CR 215 / CR 228	Joy Road in Sodus	NY 88 / CR 241	
CR 230	3.75	6.04	CR 229 / CR 232	South Centenary Road in Sodus	CR 103	
CR 231	1.15	1.85	CR 232	Austin Road in Arcadia	NY 88	
CR 232	5.30	8.53	NY 88 / CR 233 in Arcadia	Fairville–Maple Ridge Road	CR 229 / CR 230 in Sodus	
CR 233	1.60	2.57	NY 88 / CR 232	Fairville Station Road in Arcadia	CR 236	
CR 234	3.11	5.01	NY 88	Welcher Road in Arcadia	CR 236	
CR 235	2.69	4.33	CR 236 in Arcadia	Bauer–Van Wickle Road	Lyons village line in Lyons	
CR 236	10.02	16.13	Old Lyons Road in Arcadia	Arcadia Zurich Norris Road	CR 241 in Sodus	
CR 237	2.66	4.28	CR 236 in Arcadia	Zurich Road	CR 242 in Lyons	
CR 238	2.00	3.22	CR 241	Buerman Road in Sodus	CR 143	
CR 239	2.02	3.25	CR 236	Quarry Road in Sodus	CR 240	
CR 240	3.22	5.18	CR 242 / CR 243	South Geneva Road in Sodus	CR 140 / CR 143	
CR 241	2.90	4.67	NY 88 / CR 229	Sodus Center Road in Sodus	CR 240	
CR 242	7.01	11.28	Lyons village line in Lyons	Maple Street and Maple Street Road	CR 240 / CR 243 in Sodus	
CR 243	1.46	2.35	CR 240 / CR 242	Limekiln Road in Sodus	NY 14	
CR 244	2.91	4.68	Lyons village line	Pilgrimport Road in Lyons	CR 248	
CR 245	1.34	2.16	CR 244 in Lyons	Lock Berlin Road	Old Route 31 in Galen	
CR 246	2.23	3.59	NY 31	Warncke Road in Lyons	CR 244	
CR 247	3.43	5.52	CR 244 in Lyons	Travell–Knapps Corners Road	CR 250 in Galen	
CR 248	5.54	8.92	CR 244 in Lyons	Wayne Center Road	NY 14 in Sodus	
CR 249	2.21	3.56	CR 250	Kelsey Road in Galen	NY 414	
CR 250	6.52	10.49	Old Route 31 in Galen	Lakes Corners–Rose Valley Road	NY 414 in Rose	
CR 251	4.07	6.55	CR 248	Wayne Center–Rose Road in Rose	NY 414	
CR 253	1.82	2.93	NY 414	Valley Drive in Rose	Shepard Road	
CR 254	1.20	1.93	NY 104 / NY 414	Lake Bluff Road in Huron	CR 143 / CR 154	Formerly part of NY 414
CR 255	3.23	5.20	NY 414	Wolcott Road in Rose	CR 259	
CR 256	3.29	5.29	NY 414 in Rose	Fifth Road	CR 143 / CR 156 in Huron	
CR 257	2.19	3.52	NY 414	Salter Road in Rose	CR 259	
CR 258	2.27	3.65	CR 259	Whiskey Hill Road in Butler	Wolcott village line	
CR 259	2.58	4.15	CR 257 in Rose	Lasher Road	CR 258 in Butler	
CR 261	2.83	4.55	CR 256 in Huron	Wilson Road	Wolcott village line in Butler	
CR 262	6.94	11.17	Cayuga County line (becomes CR 131)	Wolcott–Spring Lake Road in Butler	NY 89 / NY 104	
CR 264	1.80	2.90	NY 89	Butler Center Road in Butler	CR 262	
CR 266	4.99	8.03	CR 262	Westbury Road in Butler	CR 267 / CR 268	
CR 267	0.93	1.50	NY 370	Westbury Cut Off in Butler	CR 266 / CR 268 at Cayuga County line (becomes CR 108)	
CR 268	2.07	3.33	CR 266 / CR 267 in Butler	Westbury–Red Creek Road	Red Creek village line in Wolcott	
CR 269	4.19	6.74	NY 414	Clyde–Hunts Corners Road in Galen	CR 271 / CR 272	
CR 270	2.63	4.23	NY 31	Daboll Road in Galen	CR 269	
CR 271	2.46	3.96	CR 269 / CR 272 in Savannah	South Butler Road	NY 89 / CR 275 in Butler	
CR 272	4.27	6.87	NY 31	Hadden Road in Savannah	CR 269 / CR 271	
CR 273	0.95	1.53	NY 31	Messner Road in Savannah	NY 89 / CR 274	
CR 274	5.61	9.03	NY 89 / CR 273	Savannah–Spring Lake Road in Savannah	CR 275	
CR 275	3.26	5.25	NY 89 / CR 271 in Butler	South Butler–Conquest Road	Cayuga County line in Savannah (becomes CR 23)	
CR 276	0.47	0.76	CR 279	Van Dyne Spoor Road in Savannah	CR 274	
CR 277	1.25	2.01	NY 89	Cotten Road in Savannah	Taylor Road	
CR 279	0.57	0.92	NY 31 / NY 89	Cotten Road in Savannah	CR 276	

== Routes 300 and up ==
Route	Length (mi)	Length (km)	From	Via	To	Notes
CR 306	2.07	3.33	Ontario County line	South Wayneport Road in Macedon	NY 31 / CR 206	
CR 308	2.20	3.54	Ontario County line (becomes CR 8)	Canandaigua Road in Macedon	NY 31	
CR 309	1.83	2.95	CR 308	Magog Road in Macedon	CR 312	
CR 310	1.77	2.85	CR 309	Erie Street in Macedon	Macedon village line	
CR 312	2.25	3.62	Ontario County line (becomes CR 28)	Alderman Road in Macedon	NY 31	
CR 316	1.21	1.95	Ontario County line	Johnson Street in Palmyra	Palmyra village line	
CR 318	1.89	3.04	Ontario County line (becomes CR 27)	Vienna Road in Palmyra	NY 31	
CR 320	0.92	1.48	CR 318	Hammond Road in Palmyra	NY 31	
CR 334	1.29	2.08	Ontario County line (becomes CR 26)	Vienna Road in Arcadia	Newark village line	
CR 336	1.99	3.20	Ontario County line	Marbletown Road in Arcadia	Newark village line	
CR 338	2.81	4.52	Ontario County line (becomes CR 6)	Old Preemption Road in Lyons	Lyons village line	
CR 339	1.59	2.56	CR 338	Alloway Road in Lyons	NY 14	
CR 340	2.61	4.20	Ontario County line	Leach Road in Lyons	Lyons village line	
CR 342	0.29	0.47	Wayne County offices	Nye Road in Lyons	NY 31	
CR 344	4.47	7.19	CR 346 in Lyons	Lyons–Marengo Road	Lyons village line in Galen	
CR 346	5.06	8.14	Seneca County line (becomes CR 107)	Clyde–Marengo Road in Galen	Clyde village line	
CR 372	5.39	8.67	Seneca County line (becomes CR 105)	Tyre Road in Galen	Clyde village line	
CR 373	1.13	1.82	Seneca County line (becomes CR 105)	Armitage Road in Savannah	NY 89 / CR 374	
CR 374	1.59	2.56	NY 89 / CR 373	Wiley Road in Savannah	CR 376	
CR 376	1.87	3.01	CR 374	Hogback Road in Savannah	NY 31	

== See also ==
- County routes in New York
- List of former state routes in New York (301–400)
