= New York State Route 37 (disambiguation) =

New York State Route 37 is an east–west state highway in the North Country of New York, United States, that was established in 1930.

New York State Route 37 may also refer to:

- New York State Route 37 (mid-1920s–1927) in Westchester and Putnam Counties
- New York State Route 37 (late 1920s – 1930) in Central New York
