= List of highways numbered 317 =

Route 317, or Highway 317, may refer to:

== Canada ==
- Manitoba Provincial Road 317
- Prince Edward Island Route 317
- Quebec Route 317
- Saskatchewan Highway 317

== China ==
- China National Highway 317

== Costa Rica ==
- National Route 317

== India ==
- National Highway 317 (India)

== Japan ==
- Japan National Route 317

== United States ==
- Colorado State Highway 317
- Connecticut Route 317
- Georgia State Route 317
- Louisiana Highway 317
- Maryland Route 317
- Minnesota State Highway 317
- Nevada State Route 317
- New Mexico State Road 317
- New York:
  - New York State Route 317 (disambiguation)
  - County Route 317 (Erie County, New York)
- Ohio State Route 317
- Pennsylvania Route 317
- Puerto Rico Highway 317
- Tennessee State Route 317
- Texas:
  - Texas State Highway 317
  - Texas State Highway Spur 317
  - Farm to Market Road 317
- Utah State Route 317
- Virginia State Route 317 (former)
- Wyoming Highway 317

Preceded by 316	Lists of highways 317	Succeeded by 318
