= List of highways numbered 316 =

The following highways are numbered 316:

== Brazil ==
- BR-316

== Canada ==
- Nova Scotia Route 316
- Prince Edward Island Route 316
- Saskatchewan Highway 316

== China ==
- China National Highway 316

== Costa Rica ==
- National Route 316

== India ==
- National Highway 316 (India)

== Japan ==
- Japan National Route 316

== United Kingdom ==
- A316 road, Chiswick, London to Sunbury-on-Thames

== United States ==
- Connecticut Route 316
- Florida State Road 316 (former)
- Georgia State Route 316
- Illinois Route 316 (former)
- Indiana State Road 316 (former)
- Iowa Highway 316
- Kentucky Route 316
- Louisiana Highway 316
- Maryland Route 316
- Minnesota State Highway 316
- Mississippi Highway 316
- New York:
  - New York State Route 316
  - County Route 316 (Erie County, New York)
- Ohio State Route 316
- Pennsylvania Route 316
- Puerto Rico Highway 316
- Tennessee State Route 316
- Texas State Highway 316
  - Texas State Highway Spur 316
  - Farm to Market Road 316
- Utah State Route 316
- Virginia State Route 316
- Wyoming Highway 316

Preceded by 315	Lists of highways 316	Succeeded by 317
