= List of highways numbered 319 =

The following highways are numbered 319:

== Brazil ==
- BR-319

== Canada ==
- Manitoba Provincial Road 319
- Prince Edward Island Route 319

== China ==
- China National Highway 319

== Costa Rica ==
- National Route 319

== Germany ==
- Bundesstraße 319

== India ==
- National Highway 319 (India)

== Japan ==
- Japan National Route 319

== United Kingdom ==
- A319 road

== United States ==
- U.S. Route 319
- Arkansas Highway 319
- Connecticut Route 319
- Georgia State Route 319 (former)
- Indiana State Road 319 (former)
- Louisiana Highway 319
- Maryland Route 319 (former)
- Montana Secondary Highway 319
- Nevada State Route 319
- New York State Route 319 (former)
- Ohio State Route 319
- Pennsylvania Route 319 (former)
- Puerto Rico Highway 319
- South Carolina Highway 319
- Tennessee State Route 319
- Texas:
  - Texas State Highway 319 (former)
  - Texas State Highway Loop 319 (former)
  - Farm to Market Road 319
- Utah State Route 319
- Virginia State Route 319
- Wyoming Highway 319
  - Wyoming Highway 319 Spur (unsigned)

Preceded by 318	Lists of highways 319	Succeeded by 320
