= County Road 318 =

County Road 318 may refer to:

- County Road 318 (Flagler County, Florida), now County Road 2006
- County Road 318 (Levy County, Florida), formerly State Road 318
  - County Road 318A (Levy County, Florida)
- County Road 318 (Marion County, Florida), formerly State Road 318
- County Route 318 (Wayne County, New York)
