= Onondaga Lake Parkway Bridge =

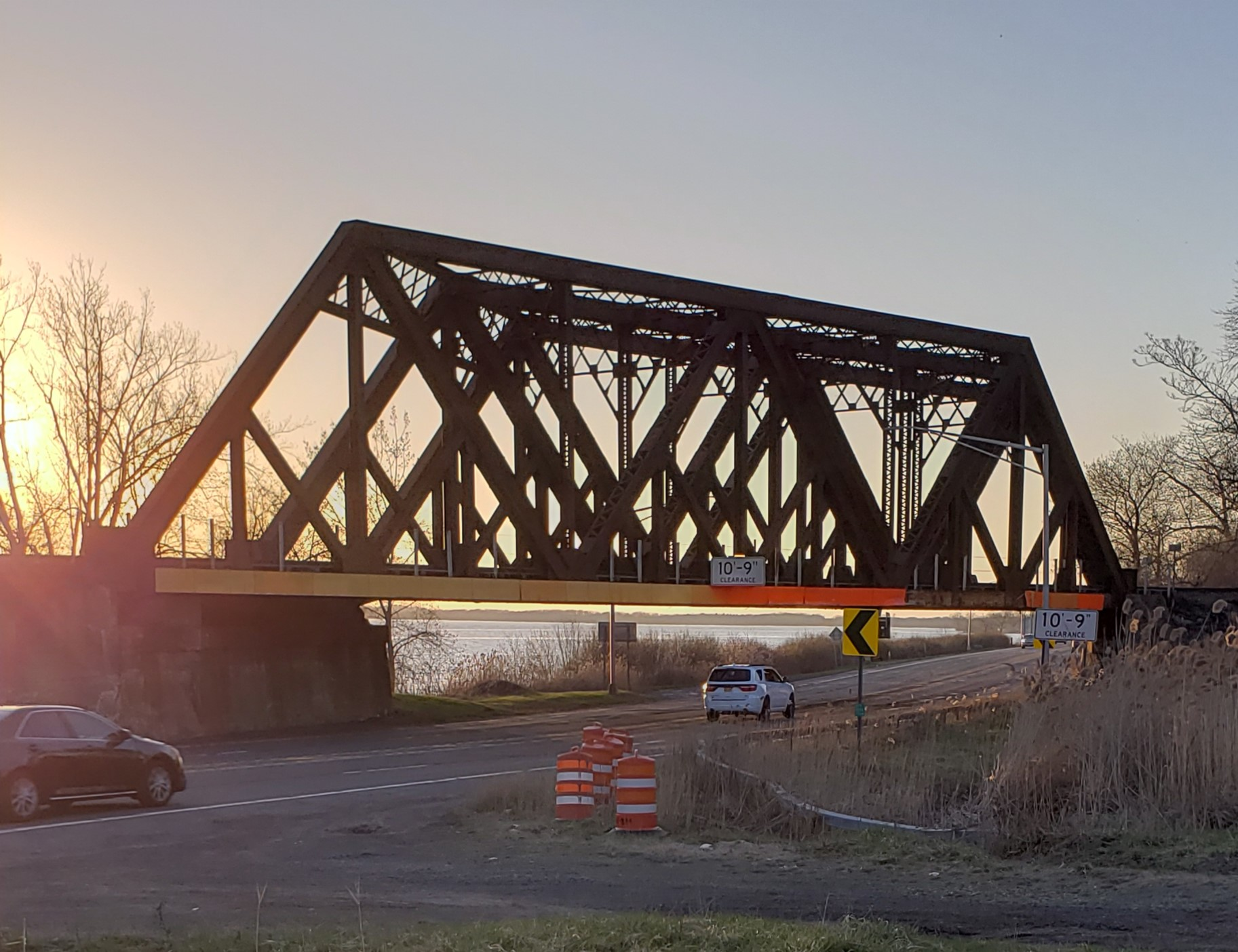
- View of the bridge in April 2023
- Coordinates: 43°5′26″N 76°11′37″W
- Carries: St. Lawrence Subdivision
- Crosses: NY 370
- Locale: Salina, New York, U.S.
- Official name: Onondaga Lake Parkway Bridge
- Other names: The "Undefeated Heavyweight Champion of Central New York"; The "World Champion" of Bridges
- Owner: CSX Transportation

Characteristics
- Design: Truss Bridge
- Material: Wrought Iron
- No. of spans: 1
- Clearance below: 10 ft 9 in (3.28 m) (as of April 2023)

History
- Opened: 1871

Location
- Interactive map of Onondaga Lake Parkway Bridge

The Onondaga Lake Parkway Bridge is a truss bridge just outside the Syracuse, New York city limits that carries the St. Lawrence Subdivision railway freight line owned by CSX Transportation over a segment of New York State Route 370, known as the Onondaga Lake Parkway. The bridge has become infamous for a large number of commercial vehicles colliding with its deck, which rises just 10 feet 9 inches (3.28 m) above grade, while driving down this stretch of NY-370.

== History ==
Constructed in 1871 from wrought iron with "substantial stone abutments," the bridge originally carried the rail line over what was then the Oswego Canal, with the first train traversing and testing the bridge on November 6 of that year. It was designed to sustain a distributed load of 230 tons and three tons in compression. A Syracuse Daily Journal reporter remarked upon its opening that the bridge was a "beautiful, substantial, and permanent one; and what every railroad bridge should be." By the early 1900s, the canal was filled in at that point and boats instead took Onondaga Lake to connect to the enlarged and modernized Erie and Oswego canals. The roadway that would later become NY routes 20, 57, and finally 370 was constructed on the former canal bed as a scenic route along the newly established Onondaga Lake Park.

=== Collisions ===
By the 1950s, the first reported collisions of commercial vehicles into the bridge's 10-foot-9-inch deck occurred in spite of a long-standing commercial vehicle ban, as the Onondaga Lake Parkway gradually turned from a leisurely route into a major thoroughfare route between Liverpool and Syracuse. This remains a common occurrence to this day, with the New York State Department of Transportation revealing that between 2020 and 2022, an average of just over 9 vehicles per year have struck the bridge, up from a normal average of 3 collisions per year. In March 2023, three trucks hit the bridge within a span of 12 days, including two within the last three days of the month.

Commercial vehicles often rise 13–14 feet above the roadway, taller than the deck of the bridge. In addition, Onondaga County and state officials have cited commercial drivers using non-commercial GPS applications such as Google Maps and Apple Maps, which often route truckers along the parkway and into the bridge. Despite the NYSDOT spending significant funds on countermeasures and warning signage, including up to $30 million between 2020 and early 2023, trucks have continued to crash into the bridge on a regular basis, oftentimes driven by drivers from outside the area, and the recurring collisions into the bridge have inspired internet humor in the Syracuse area.

Concerns have been raised about the structural integrity of the bridge after several collisions, but the bridge has remained stable and in good condition as its wrought iron structure was "remarkably well-constructed". In 1996, Department of Transportation official Ray McDougall quipped that the bridge has "won every one" in regard to withstanding numerous collisions over the years. The bridge has jokingly been referred to as the "undefeated heavyweight champion of Central New York" due to withstanding numerous truck crashes.

While many of the crashes have simply been nuisances to the public resulting in few to no injuries, with semi-trailer trucks scraping the bridge or breaking open and spilling their contents after hitting the bridge, a fatal accident occurred in 2010 when a Megabus double-decker bus hit the bridge, killing four passengers. A disaster was narrowly averted in 1992 when a 13-foot-tall tractor trailer wedged itself under the bridge while carrying 40,000 pounds of corrosive powder.

== Timeline ==
Date	Vehicle	Outcome	Notes
August 4th, 2026	Box Truck	The driver was issued 12 tickets. 10 for failure to obey a traffic control device and 2 commercial vehicle violations. No injuries reported.	
June 5th, 2026	Box Truck		
May 24th, 2026	Cement Mixer	The driver was issued 10 tickets. No injuries reported.	
March 26th, 2026	Plain Box Truck		
December 12, 2025	Mack Truck		All lanes of the road were closed for a brief period of time.
August 1, 2025	Enterprise Box Truck	The driver was issued 14 tickets. No injuries reported.	Driver received ticket for violation of operating out of restriction (not wearing glasses).
June 20, 2025	Enterprise Box Truck	The driver was issued multiple traffic tickets including 10 counts of Failure to Obey a Traffic Control Device	
May 6, 2025	Lyon King Logistics Box Truck	The driver was issued 12 tickets. No injuries reported.	
February 18, 2025	Semi-Truck	The driver was issued 5 tickets for disobeying a traffic control device. No injuries reported.	Driver received an additional ticket for aggravated unlicensed operation in the third degree.
February 10, 2025	Enterprise Box Truck	The driver was issued 2 tickets.	
November 25, 2024	Semi-Truck	The driver was issued 18 tickets.	
August 28, 2024	Ryder Box Truck		
May 17, 2024	Semi-Truck		
April 26, 2024	Ryder Box Truck	The driver was issued 4 tickets.	
March 27, 2024	Box Truck	The driver was issued 25 tickets.	
December 8, 2023	ABR Wholesales Box Truck		
November 8, 2023	Ryder Box Truck	The driver was issued a ticket for disobeying a traffic control device.	This vehicle didn't hit the bridge, driver was pulled over beforehand
October 4, 2023	American Moving and Hauling Box Truck	The driver received 10 tickets.	
September 27, 2023	Box Truck	The driver was issued 10 tickets.	
May 2, 2023	Penske Box Truck	The driver was issued 14 tickets.	
April 26, 2023	Greyhound Bus and a Car	The bus was turning around to avoid the bridge when it was hit by a car. No injuries reported. The bus did not hit the bridge but was illegally driving on the road.	The bus did not hit the bridge but was illegally driving on the road.
April 25, 2023	NYS DOT Vehicle	Driver was not issued any tickets.	
March 31, 2023	Box truck	The driver was issued 22 tickets.	Third incident in the span of 12 days.
March 29, 2023	Semi-Truck	The driver was issued 2 tickets.	
March 20, 2023	Semi-Truck	The driver was issued 2 tickets.	
February 8, 2023	Semi-Truck	No injuries were reported, unknown if the driver received citations.	
November 22, 2023	Semi-Truck		
October 31, 2023	Semi-Truck	Major damage was caused to the truck. The driver suffered minor injuries. One ticket was issued.	
December 30, 2022	Amazon Truck		The truck did not hit the bridge, but was forced to turn around by police.
June 13, 2022	Amazon Truck		
March 31, 2022	Box Truck		
July 6, 2022	Box Truck		
May 28, 2021	Penske Rental Box Truck		
May 26, 2021	Box Truck		
December 30, 2020	Ryder Box Truck		
October 22, 2020	Semi-Truck		
October 9, 2020	Box Truck		
July 26, 2019	Semi Truck		
June 25, 2017	RV	The driver was issued a ticket	
January 7, 2016	Semi-Truck	The driver issued 2 tickets.	
December 30, 2013	Semi-Truck	The driver was issued multiple tickets.	
September 11, 2010	Double Decker Mega-Bus	Four People were killed as a result of the crash. The driver was later found not guilty.	
January 17, 1992	Semi-Truck		

== Efforts to improve the roadway ==
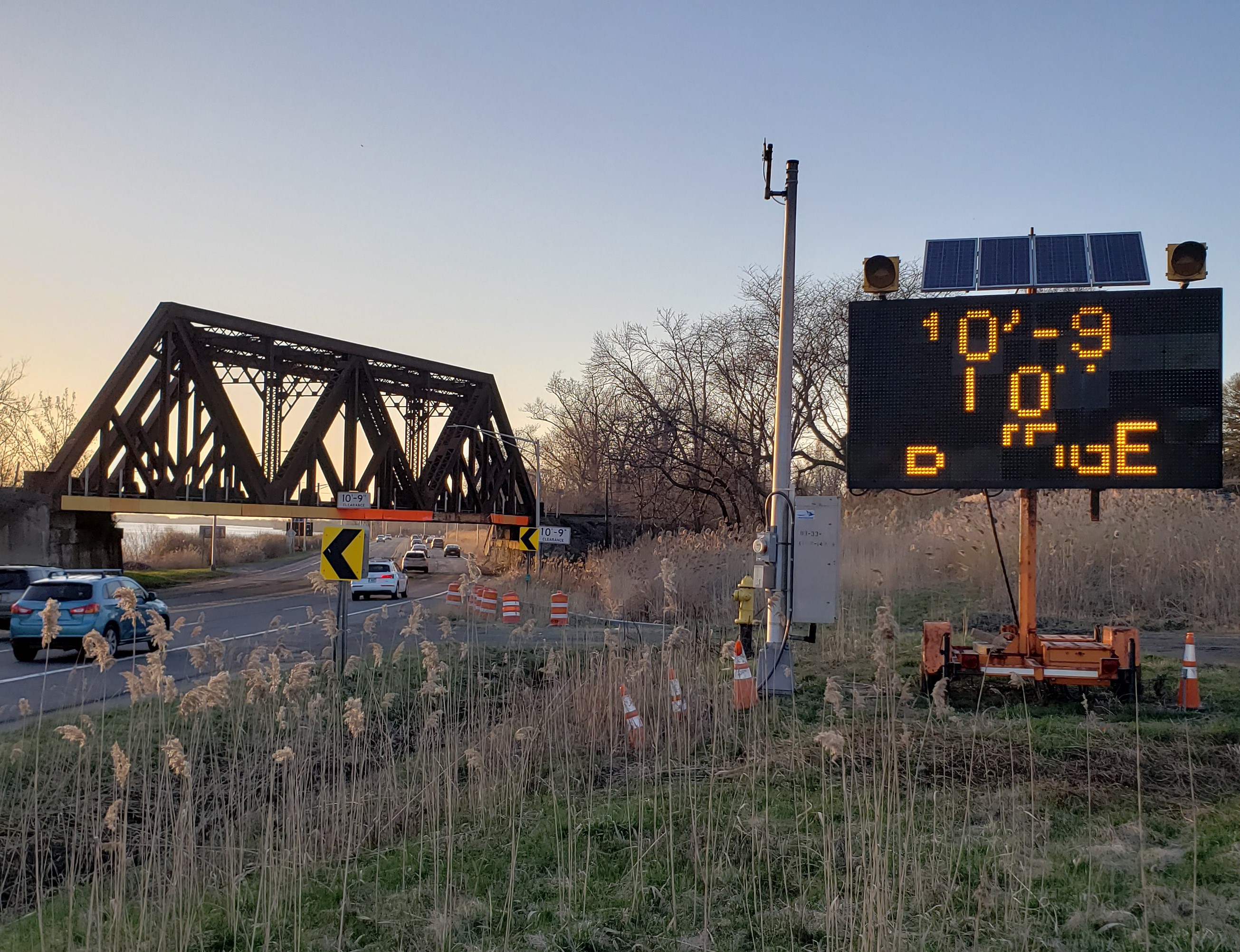
Temporary electronic road sign next to the bridge on NY-370 in 2023, warning of its low height

After the 2010 Megabus crash, the NYSDOT installed an over-height vehicle detection system in the fall of 2011 in an attempt to more effectively enforce the commercial vehicle ban on the parkway and warn truckers to turn around. Truck drivers who ignore the warning signs and subsequently crash into the bridge are now ticketed. A study that was undertaken after the fatal 2010 Megabus crash showed that it was not feasible to raise the bridge or deepen the roadway, as the bridge is also owned by CSX and current geotechnical engineering rules prohibit the roadway from being below the water level of Onondaga Lake. CSX has stated that it is open to a project to raise the bridge if the state pays for it.

Following several collisions in early 2023, the state has narrowed the parkway under the bridge to 1 lane in both directions in a continued effort to divert trucks. In addition, the exit ramp from Interstate 81/future Business Loop 81 to access the parkway has been closed until further notice. In 2026, the state installed permanent signs and sensors along the parkway, with bridge strikes of any sort, including on the Onondaga Lake Parkway Bridge, becoming punishable by 8 points on a driver's license. It has also been noted that the number of annual bridge strikes has decreased since 2023.

== See also ==
- List of bridges known for strikes
