= Victory, Cayuga County, New York =

Victory, New York
- Town
- Location within Cayuga County and New York

- Location within New York Location within the United States
- Coordinates: 43°11′50″N 76°39′16″W
- Country: United States
- State: New York
- County: Cayuga

Government
  - Type: Town Council
  - Town Supervisor: Robert R. Ingham (R)
  - Town Council: Members' List: • Scott G. Bloss (R); • Eleanor J. Pittroff (R); • David Shurtleff, Sr. (R); • Lester H. Van Dyke (R)

Area
  - Total: 34.45 sq mi (89.23 km^{2})
  - Land: 34.39 sq mi (89.08 km^{2})
  - Water: 0.058 sq mi (0.15 km^{2})
- Elevation: 431 ft (131 m)

Population (2010)
  - Total: 1,660
  - Density: 48.3/sq mi (18.6/km^{2})
- Time zone: Eastern (EST)
- ZIP Codes: 13033 (Cato); 13111 (Martville); 13143 (Red Creek)
- FIPS code: 36-011-77420
- Website: www.cayugacounty.us/townofvictory

Victory is a town in Cayuga County, New York, United States. The population was 1,660 at the 2010 census. The name celebrates the political victory in forming the town. It is in the northwestern part of the county and north of Auburn.

== History ==
Victory was within the Central New York Military Tract. The town was first settled circa 1799.

The town was formed from the town of Cato in 1821 after a bitter political dispute about whether to break up Cato. The town of Conquest was formed at the same time and also given a name celebrating the split.

== Geography ==
According to the United States Census Bureau, Victory has a total area of 34.4 square miles (89.2 km^{2}), of which 34.4 square miles (89.1 km^{2}) is land and 0.08 square miles (0.2 km^{2}), or 0.17%, is water.

The western town line is the border of Wayne County.

Sterling Creek flows northward through the town toward Lake Ontario.

New York State Route 38 intersects New York State Route 370 by Victory village. New York State Route 104 runs along the northern town line.

== Demographics ==
Historical population
Census	Pop.	Note	%±
1830	1,819		—
1840	2,371		30.3%
1850	2,298		−3.1%
1860	2,077		−9.6%
1870	1,898		−8.6%
1880	1,952		2.8%
1890	1,706		−12.6%
1900	1,398		−18.1%
1910	1,208		−13.6%
1920	1,078		−10.8%
1930	1,037		−3.8%
1940	1,152		11.1%
1950	1,154		0.2%
1960	1,159		0.4%
1970	1,251		7.9%
1980	1,519		21.4%
1990	1,535		1.1%
2000	1,838		19.7%
2010	1,660		−9.7%
U.S. Decennial Census

As of the census of 2000, there were 1,838 people, 617 households, and 481 families residing in the town. The population density was 53.5 inhabitants per square mile (20.7/km^{2}). There were 662 housing units at an average density of 19.3 per square mile (7.5/km^{2}). The racial makeup of the town was 97.17% White, 0.38% African American, 0.87% Native American, 0.16% Asian, 0.27% Pacific Islander, 0.11% from other races, and 1.03% from two or more races. Hispanic or Latino of any race were 0.44% of the population.

There were 617 households, out of which 43.1% had children under the age of 18 living with them, 63.2% were married couples living together, 7.1% had a female householder with no husband present, and 22.0% were non-families. 18.2% of all households were made up of individuals, and 6.0% had someone living alone who was 65 years of age or older. The average household size was 2.98 and the average family size was 3.36.

In the town, the population was spread out, with 32.0% under the age of 18, 7.3% from 18 to 24, 31.9% from 25 to 44, 20.9% from 45 to 64, and 7.8% who were 65 years of age or older. The median age was 34 years. For every 100 females, there were 104.2 males. For every 100 females age 18 and over, there were 107.6 males.

The median income for a household in the town was $38,672, and the median income for a family was $41,680. Males had a median income of $32,232 versus $23,150 for females. The per capita income for the town was $15,462. About 7.9% of families and 10.6% of the population were below the poverty line, including 15.7% of those under age 18 and 8.1% of those age 65 or over.

== Communities and locations in Victory ==
- Ira Corners – A location on the eastern town line.
- K Cat Corners A location in the eastern part of the town, northeast of Victory village.
- North Victory – A hamlet near the northern town boundary (mostly in the town of Sterling) on NY-104. It was settled circa 1812.
- Victory – The hamlet of Victory at the junction of Routes NY-38 and NY-370 near the center of the town. The community was settled c. 1806.
- Westbury – A hamlet on the western town line, partly in Wayne County. It was first settled c. 1806.
