= Onondaga Lake Park =

Park in New York, United States

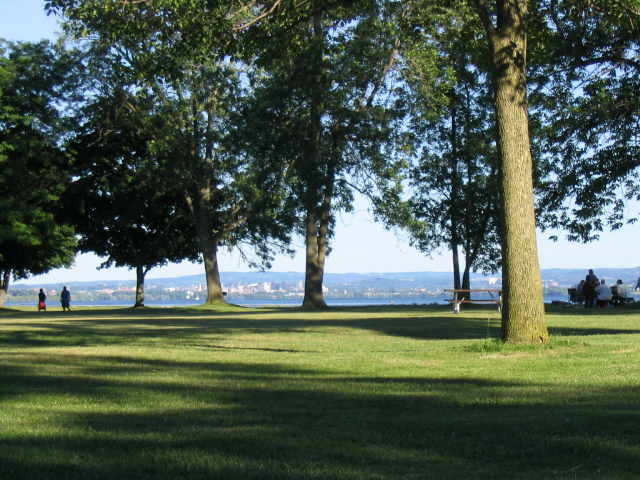
- Onondaga Lake with the Syracuse skyline in the background
- Interactive map of Onondaga Lake Park
- Location: East shore of Onondaga Lake; 6790 Onondaga Lake Trail; Liverpool, New York
- Coordinates: 43°5′58″N 76°12′8″W

Onondaga Lake Park is an over 8-mile (12.8 km) linear greenway located on the shores of Onondaga Lake in Onondaga County, New York. The park is shared between the towns of Salina and Geddes and the city of Syracuse and is home to the Salt Museum, East Shore Recreation Trail and West Shore Trail.

== History ==
=== East Shore Recreation Trail ===
Over two and one-half miles long and twenty feet wide, this paved trail is used for in-line skating and bicycling. During the peak season of April to October, pedestrian use is allowed only if it does not impede wheeled users and stay within three feet of the shoulder and with no more than two abreast. Dogs are not allowed on the trail during peak season. Trams follow the center line.

=== Shoreline Walking Trail ===
Designated for walkers and runners, only foot traffic is allowed on this two mile long trail adjacent to the eastern lake shore. Distance markers along the route help users log their mileage. Special uses (strollers, children's bicycles with training wheels, tricycles and wheel chair users) are also permitted on this trail which is not plowed in the winter.

=== West Shore Trail ===
The West Shore Trail is 4.5 miles (7.2 km) long from where it connects to the East Shore Recreation Trail at its most western end to its most eastern end off Exit 7 of Interstate 690. Located along the western shore of Onondaga Lake, this paved trail meanders through over 4.5 miles (ca. 7 km) of woodlands and open areas. It is used by bicyclists, walkers, runners and nature enthusiasts. This side of Onondaga Lake once had several resorts and dance halls. There are several shelters and benches along the trail. The newly opened extension has lake and city views and runs through the Lakeview Amphitheater, though that portion of the trail is closed during concert events.

=== Lakeland Trail ===
Located off the West Shore Trail, this partial stonedust and natural surfaced trail is ideal for solitude and observation.

== Park events ==
- Antiquefest annual event in July.

== See also ==
- Onondaga Park
- Onondaga Lake Parkway Bridge
