= List of highways numbered 320 =

The following highways are numbered 320:

== Canada ==
- Newfoundland and Labrador Route 320
- Nova Scotia Route 320
- Saskatchewan Highway 320

== China ==
- China National Highway 320

== Costa Rica ==
- National Route 320

== India ==
- National Highway 320 (India)

== Japan ==
- Japan National Route 320

== United States ==
- U.S. Route 320 (former)
- Arkansas Highway 320
- Connecticut Route 320
- Florida State Road 320
  - County Road 320 (Florida)
- Georgia State Route 320
- Hawaii Route 320
- Kentucky Route 320
- Louisiana Highway 320
- Maryland Route 320
- Montana Secondary Highway 320
- Nevada State Route 320
- New Mexico State Road 320
- New York State Route 320
- Ohio State Route 320
- Pennsylvania Route 320
- Puerto Rico Highway 320
- Tennessee State Route 320
- Texas:
  - Texas State Highway 320
  - Texas State Highway Loop 320 (former)
  - Farm to Market Road 320
- Utah State Route 320
- Virginia State Route 320
- Wyoming Highway 320

Preceded by 319	Lists of highways 320	Succeeded by 321
