= New York State Route 317 (disambiguation) =

New York State Route 317 is a north–south state highway in Onondaga County, New York, United States, that was established in 2003.

New York State Route 317 may also refer to:

- New York State Route 317 (1930 – early 1940s) in Herkimer County
- New York State Route 317 (early 1940s – 1980) in Rensselaer County
