= New York State Route 370 =

State highway in central New York, US

New York State Route 370
- Map of Central New York with NY 370 highlighted in red

Route information
- Maintained by NYSDOT and the city of Syracuse
- Length: 35.09 mi (56.47 km)
- Existed: 1930–present
- Restrictions: No commercial vehicles on Onondaga Lake Parkway

Major junctions
- West end: NY 104 / NY 104A near Red Creek
- NY 31 / NY 690 near Baldwinsville
- East end: US 11 / NY 298 Truck in Syracuse

Location
- Country: United States
- State: New York
- Counties: Wayne, Cayuga, Onondaga

Highway system
- New York Highways; Interstate; US; State; Reference; Parkways
← NY 369	→ NY 371

New York State Route 370 (NY 370) is an east–west state highway in Central New York in the United States. It extends for about 35 miles (56.33 km) from an intersection with NY 104 and NY 104A south of the Wayne County village of Red Creek to a junction with U.S. Route 11 (US 11) in the Onondaga County city of Syracuse. The western and central portions of the route pass through mostly rural areas; however, the eastern section serves densely populated areas of Onondaga County, including the villages of Baldwinsville and Liverpool. NY 370 also passes through Cayuga County, where it connects to NY 34, a major north–south highway in Central New York.

NY 370 was assigned as part of the 1930 renumbering of state highways in New York as a Red Creek–Liverpool highway, replacing NY 40 west of Cato and New York State Route 37 from Cato to Baldwinsville. From Liverpool to Syracuse, modern NY 370 was initially part of NY 57, a route that continued north from Liverpool to Oswego. That route was eliminated in 1982, at which time NY 370 was extended eastward to Syracuse over NY 57's former routing. Other minor changes, namely a series of realignments west of Victory, have also occurred since NY 370 was assigned.

== Route description ==
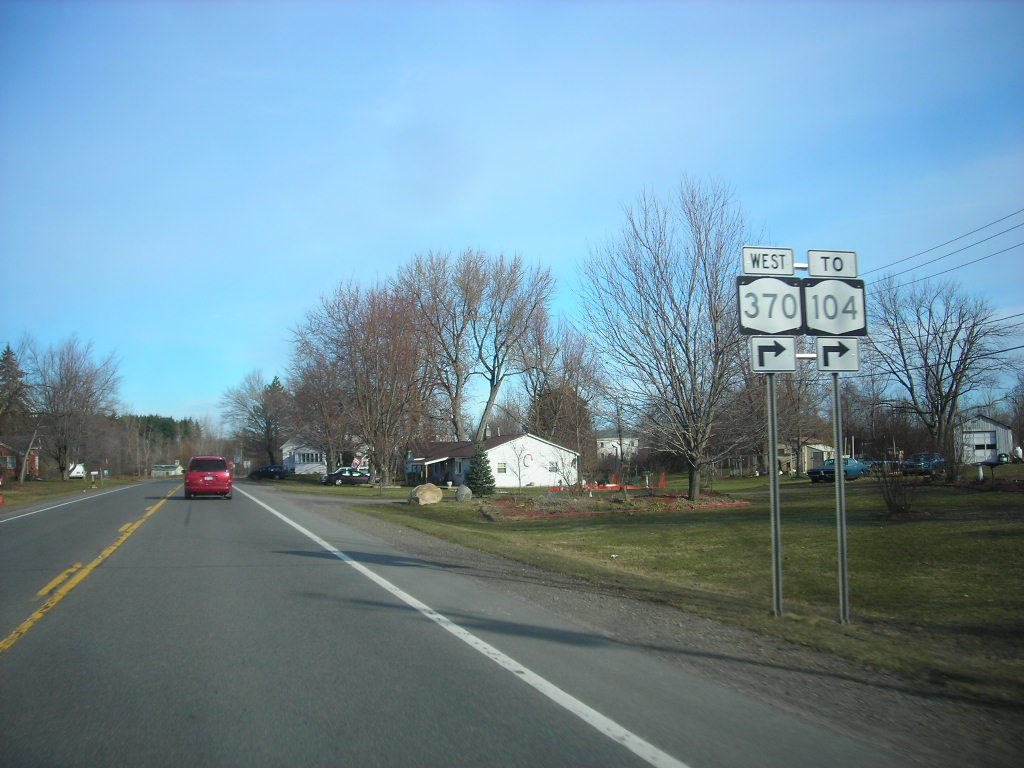
Approaching Ridge Road on NY 370 westbound in Wolcott

Maintenance of the route is also split in a similar fashion. West of Syracuse, the route is maintained by the New York State Department of Transportation (NYSDOT). Within Syracuse, the highway is city-maintained.

=== Red Creek to Baldwinsville ===
NY 370 begins at an intersection with NY 104 and NY 104A south of the village of Red Creek in the northeastern Wayne County town of Wolcott. The route heads southwest from this spot, utilizing a northeastward extension of Ridge Road that was part of US 104 prior to the construction of the super two highway now used by NY 104. After passing 0.7 miles (1.1 km) of open farmland, the route breaks from Ridge Road and travels southeast through the Town of Butler and to the Cayuga County line. The rural surroundings follow NY 370 across the county line and into the town of Victory, where the highway briefly takes on a more easterly alignment as it intersects NY 38 in the town center. Past NY 38, NY 370 gradually curves southward for roughly 2.5 miles (4.0 km) to reach the Victory–Conquest town line. Here, it overtakes the east–west Conquest–Victory Town Line Road and heads eastward along the town line toward the village of Cato.

Just west of Cato village, NY 370 enters nearby Ira and the town of Cato. The route continues along the town line into the small village of Cato, where it becomes Main Street and meets NY 34 in the village center. At this point, NY 370 leaves the town line and heads northeast into Ira at the eastern village line. While in Ira, the highway leaves the village of Cato and passes by Cato–Meridian Central School, located in an otherwise nondescript area of the town dominated by farmland. At the school, the road curves back to the southeast to serve the village of Meridian and reenter the town of Cato. Here, the route reverts to a generally easterly alignment, one that it retains for the next 10 miles (16 km) to Baldwinsville. East of Meridian, NY 370 crosses more cultivated fields as it intersects the south end of NY 176 and crosses into Onondaga County.

Across the county line, NY 370 enters the town of Lysander and becomes known as West Genesee Road. It runs across another 2 miles (3.2 km) of rolling farmland before it begins to parallel the Erie Canal, here part of the Seneca River. At this point, the open fields gradually give way to pockets of residential development as the route approaches the village of Baldwinsville. West of the village limits, NY 370 connects to NY 31 and NY 690 at NY 690's continuation of Interstate 690's (I-690) northernmost grade-separated interchange. NY 31—which overlaps with NY 690 south of the junction—leaves the freeway and joins NY 370 for a 2-mile (3.2 km) overlap that takes both routes along the north bank of the canal and into the densely populated village. They remain overlapped through Baldwinsville's central business district, where they meet NY 48 at Oswego Street.

=== Syracuse area ===
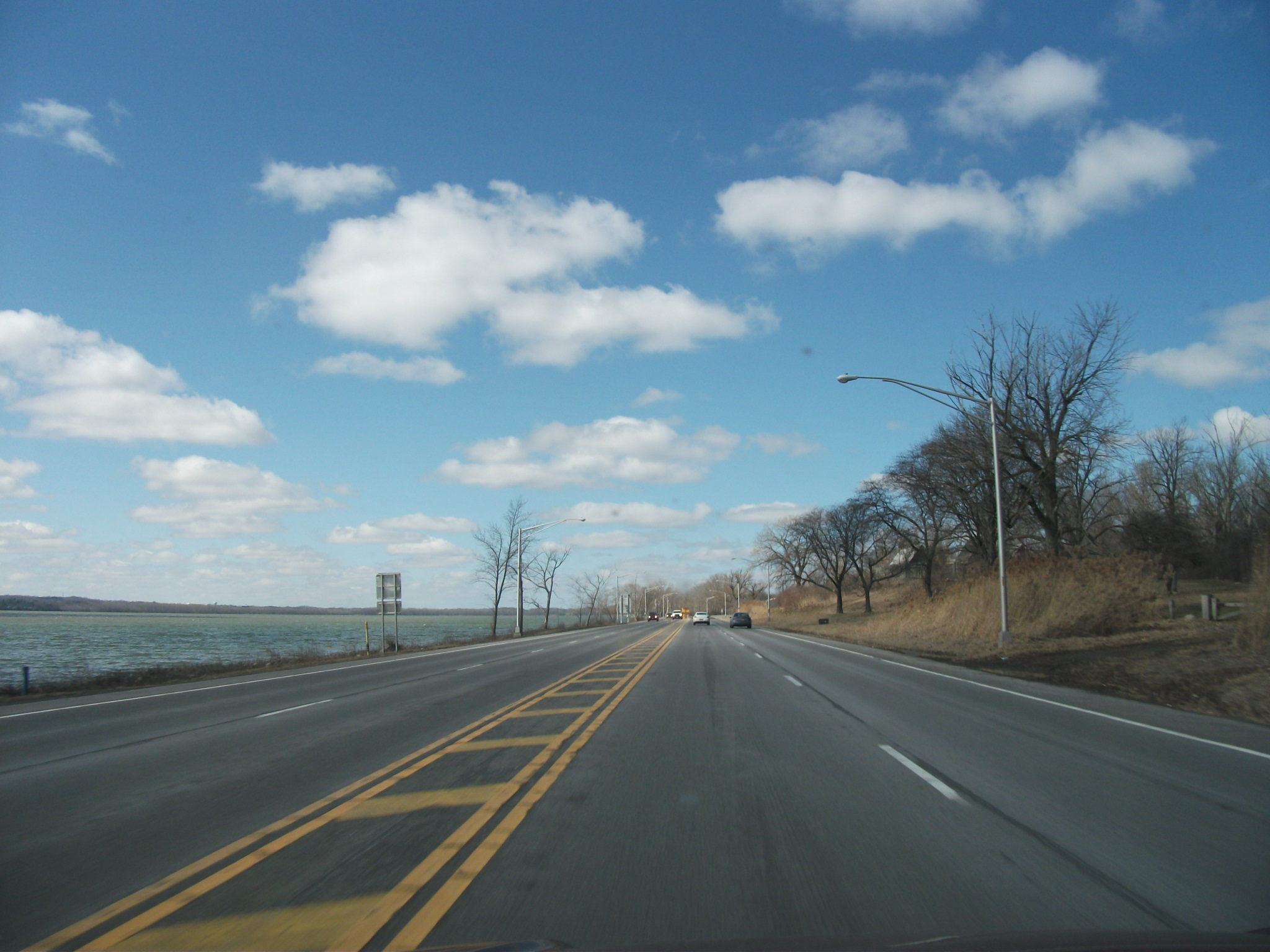
Running alongside Onondaga Lake on NY 370 westbound near Liverpool

At the eastern edge of the village center, NY 31 and NY 370 split, with NY 31 retaining the Genesee Street name and heading northeast towards Oneida Lake. NY 370, meanwhile, travels southeast on Salina Street, loosely paralleling the Erie Canal as it heads toward Syracuse. The route intersects NY 631 before leaving Baldwinsville and heading into another rural section of Lysander. This open stretch ends at the canalside hamlet of Cold Springs, which serves as the beginning of the Syracuse suburbs. After passing through the community, NY 370 crosses over the conjoined Erie Canal and Seneca River and enters the town of Salina. Not far from the canal is a junction with John Glenn Boulevard, a four-lane arterial connecting NY 370 to Interstate 690 (I-690).

Past John Glenn Boulevard, NY 370 passes over the New York State Thruway (Interstate 90 or I-90) near exit 38 and begins to approach the northern shore of Onondaga Lake as it enters the village of Liverpool on 2nd Street. In the village's commercial center, NY 370 intersects Oswego Street, which connects to I-90, once part of NY 57 and now NY 931G, an unsigned reference route. Here, NY 370 turns onto Oswego Street for one block before veering southeastward onto Onondaga Lake Parkway, an undivided four-lane expressway running along the northeastern shoreline of Onondaga Lake where commercial vehicles and vehicles over 10 ft 9 in (3.28 m) are banned. This section of the route also parallels the CSX Transportation-owned St. Lawrence Subdivision, which crosses the highway by way of a low, 10-foot-9-inch (3.28 m) overpass 1 mile (1.6 km) southeast of Liverpool.

The parkway ends 2 miles (3.2 km) from Liverpool at the eastern tip of the lake, where the route connects to I-81 Bus at exit 5. NY 370 continues through the interchange, following the two-lane Park Street into the city of Syracuse. In its first few blocks in the city, the highway passes under the Mohawk Subdivision—CSX's main line across Central New York—and serves both NBT Bank Stadium and the Central New York Regional Market. East of the market, the route continues for one more block through an industrial area of Syracuse to Wolf Street, where NY 370 ends at US 11 and NY 298 Truck 1.5 miles (2.4 km) northwest of downtown Syracuse.

== History ==
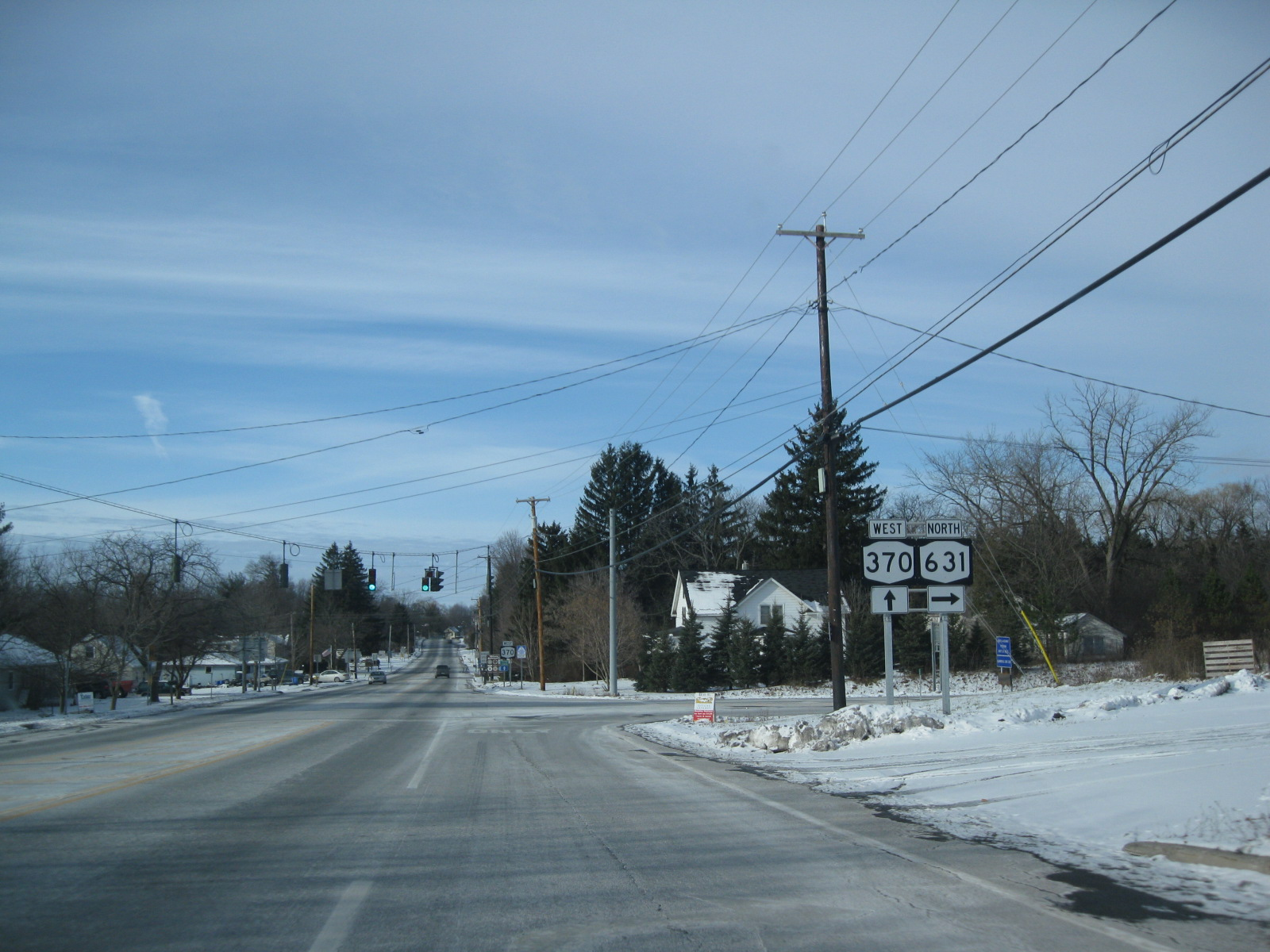
NY 370 west at NY 631 in Baldwinsville

The portion of NY 370 east of Oswego Street in Liverpool was originally designated as part of Route 34, an unsigned legislative route, in 1908. The portion that would become the Onondaga Lake Parkway was built on the filled-in original route of the Oswego Canal, which traveled by the shore of Onondaga Lake to meet with the original Erie Canal in downtown Syracuse. When the first set of posted routes in New York were assigned in 1924, Route 34 became the basis for NY 20, a highway extending from Syracuse to Oswego via Liverpool and Fulton. NY 20 was renumbered to NY 57 in 1927 to eliminate duplication with the newly assigned US 20. To the west, the section of modern NY 370 from Upton Road west of the hamlet of Victory to NY 34 in Cato was designated as part of NY 40 in the mid-1920s. West of Victory, NY 40 followed Upton Road and Canada Street before terminating at NY 3 (now NY 104A) in Red Creek.

Although the portion of what is now NY 370 from Cato to Liverpool was state-maintained by 1926, it remained unnumbered until the late 1920s. At that time, the section west of then-NY 31 (now NY 48) in Baldwinsville became NY 37. The designation proved to be short-lived as it was renumbered to NY 370 as part of the 1930 renumbering of state highways in New York. At the same time, NY 40 was split into several different routes. From Cato to just east of Red Creek, old NY 40 became part of the new NY 370, which also extended southeastward to NY 57 in Liverpool. The small segment of former NY 40 from NY 3 to Upton Road was included in NY 3E (later US 104).

The portion of NY 370 west of Victory was realigned in the late 1950s to follow its modern alignment to a new terminus at US 104 (Ridge Road) southwest of Red Creek. After US 104 (now NY 104) was rerouted to follow a new super two highway through the Red Creek area in the early 1970s, the portion of Ridge Road between the super two east of Wolcott and NY 370 southwest of Red Creek became a westward extension of NY 370. The route was altered slightly at some point in the late 1970s or early 1980s to follow Ridge Road northeast to NY 104 instead.

In May 1982, the NY 57 designation was eliminated after the portion of the route north of Liverpool was removed from the state highway system. From Tulip Street to the Onondaga–Oswego county line, NY 57 was redesignated as County Route 91 (CR 91) but signed as CR 57. The portion of NY 57's former routing between NY 370 in Liverpool and US 11 in Syracuse became part of an extended NY 370.

=== Onondaga Lake Parkway Bridge collisions ===
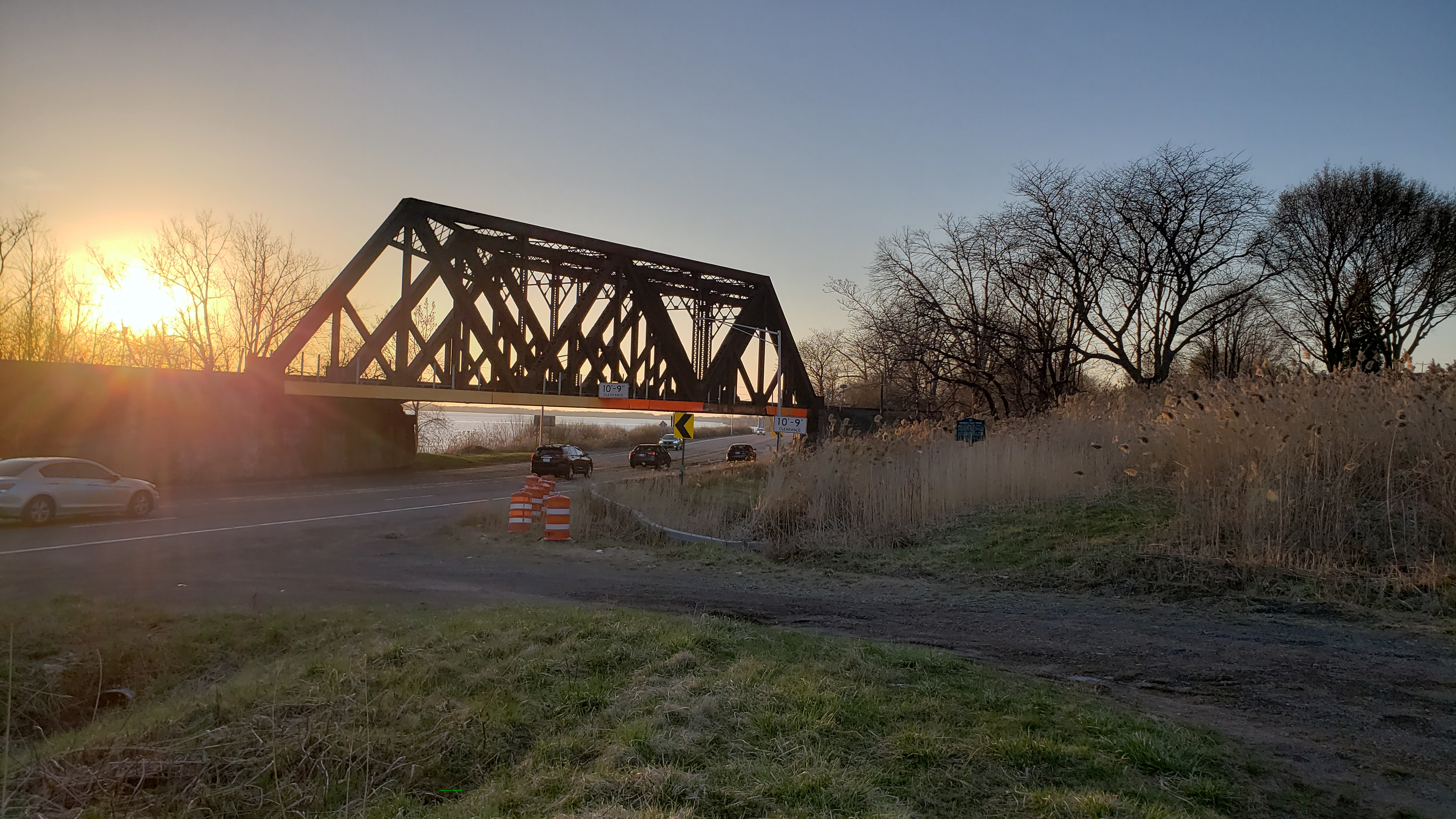
NY-370 passing under the Onondaga Lake Parkway Bridge, which is known for frequent truck collisions

On September 11, 2010, a Megabus double-decker bus hit the low 10 ft 9 in (3.28 m) railroad bridge along the Onondaga Lake Parkway killing four passengers. An overheight warning system was set up along the Parkway in late 2011 coinciding with the banning of commercial traffic along this stretch. Despite the efforts of the NYSDOT to increase warning signage along the parkway, spending as much as $30 million between 2020 and early 2023 towards countermeasures, the Onondaga Lake Parkway Bridge remains infamous in the Syracuse area as a number of trucks continue to crash into its low deck on a regular basis, as has been for much of its history since the 1950s.

== Major intersections ==
County	Location	mi	km	Destinations	Notes
Wayne	Town of Wolcott	0.00	0.00	NY 104 / NY 104A north – Red Creek, Wolcott, Rochester, Oswego	Western terminus; southern terminus of NY 104A
Cayuga	Victory	5.84	9.40	NY 38 – Port Byron, Fair Haven	
Cayuga	Village of Cato	11.23	18.07	NY 34 (North Street / South Street) to I-90 / New York Thruway	
Cayuga	Meridian	14.35	23.09	NY 176 north / Myers Road – Fulton	Southern terminus of NY 176
Onondaga	Lysander	22.43– 22.58	36.10– 36.34	NY 31 west / NY 690 – Syracuse, Fulton	Interchange; western terminus of NY 31 / NY 370 overlap
Onondaga	Baldwinsville	24.15	38.87	NY 48 (Oswego Street)	
Onondaga	Baldwinsville	24.45	39.35	NY 31 east (Genesee Street)	Eastern terminus of NY 31 / NY 370 overlap
Onondaga	Baldwinsville	25.06	40.33	NY 631 north – Radisson	Southern terminus of NY 631
Onondaga	Liverpool	32.02	51.53	Oswego Street / NY 931G to CR 57 north (CR 91) – Fulton, Oswego; Cypress Street	Formerly NY 57
Onondaga	Syracuse	34.11– 34.61	54.89– 55.70	I-81 BL south / Park Street / Old Liverpool Road – Syracuse	Exit 5A (BL I-81); access via NY 936E and NY 936F
Onondaga	Syracuse	35.01	56.34	Hiawatha Road to I-81 BL / I-90 / I-690 – NBT Bank Stadium, NYS Fairgrounds	
Onondaga	Syracuse	35.09	56.47	US 11 / NY 298 Truck (Wolf Street) / Park Street	Eastern terminus
1.000 mi = 1.609 km; 1.000 km = 0.621 mi: Concurrency terminus; Incomplete access
