= Wolcott, New York =

- Town
- Location in Wayne County and the state of New York.

- Location within the state of New York
- Coordinates: 43°13′14″N 76°48′46″W
- Country: United States
- State: New York
- County: Wayne
- Settled: 1807
- Established: March 24, 1807

Government
  - Type: Town Board
  - Supervisor: Lynn Chatfield
  - Clerk: Jessica Freer
  - Court: Justice Henry Krasucki; Justice Roger Misso

Area
  - Total: 39.95 sq mi (103.47 km^{2})
  - Land: 39.05 sq mi (101.14 km^{2})
  - Water: 0.90 sq mi (2.33 km^{2})
- Elevation: 354 ft (108 m)

Population (2010)
  - Total: 4,453
  - Estimate (2016): 4,140
  - Density: 106.0/sq mi (40.93/km^{2})
- Time zone: UTC-5 (Eastern (EST))
  - Summer (DST): UTC-4 (EDT)
- ZIP code: 14590
- Area codes: 315 and 680
- FIPS code: 36-82678
- GNIS feature ID: 0971538
- Website: https://www.townofwolcottny.gov/

Wolcott is a town in the north-eastern corner of Wayne County, New York, United States. The population of the town was 4,453 at the 2010 census. The town is named after Governor Oliver Wolcott of Connecticut.

The Town of Wolcott is in the northeast corner of the county. There are two villages within the town: Wolcott and Red Creek. The town lies west of Syracuse.

== History ==
The first white colonist settlement began around 1807. Native Americans settled the land many years before. The Town of Wolcott was formed 1807 from the Town of Junius in Seneca County, New York before the creation of Wayne County, but the town was not completely organized until 1810. The land on which the town was formed on was previously inhabited by Cayuga and Onondaga Native Americans, who were exiled for siding with the British by Revolutionary War troops led by General Anthony Wayne and subsequently displaced by white European colonists, but who have been free to return for well over a century.

The town was later reduced in size by the formation of new towns in the county: Butler, Huron, and Rose, all in 1826.

The discovery of iron ore in the county led to the smelting operation at Wolcott furnace north of Wolcott village from 1821 to 1869.

== Geography ==
According to the United States Census Bureau, the town has a total area of 40.2 square miles (104.0 km^{2}), of which, 39.3 square miles (101.8 km^{2}) of it is land and 0.9 square miles (2.2 km^{2}) of it (2.14%) is water.

The town's north border is Lake Ontario, and the east town line is Cayuga County.

The Clinton Formation of red hematite led to the early iron production industry in the town and county.

At Red Creek, east–west highway New York State Route 104 splits off New York State Route 104A, which becomes a north–south highway near the east town line. New York State Route 370 is in the southeast part of the town.

== Demographics ==
Historical population
Census	Pop.	Note	%±
1820	2,867		—
1830	1,085		−62.2%
1840	2,481		128.7%
1850	2,751		10.9%
1860	3,063		11.3%
1870	3,223		5.2%
1880	3,731		15.8%
1890	3,216		−13.8%
1900	3,207		−0.3%
1910	2,952		−8.0%
1920	2,792		−5.4%
1930	2,876		3.0%
1940	3,021		5.0%
1950	3,276		8.4%
1960	3,498		6.8%
1970	3,764		7.6%
1980	4,021		6.8%
1990	4,283		6.5%
2000	4,692		9.5%
2010	4,453		−5.1%
2016 (est.)	4,140	▼	−7.0%
U.S. Decennial Census

As of the census of 2010, there were 4,453 people, 1,732 households, and 1,123 families residing in the town. The population density was 110.8 inhabitants per square mile (42.8/km^{2}). There were 2,273 housing units at an average density of 56.5 per square mile (21.8/km^{2}). The racial makeup of the town was 93.1% White, 3.7% Black or African American, 0.3% Native American, 0.2% Asian, 0.0% Pacific Islander, 1.0% from other races, and 1.7% from two or more races. Hispanic or Latino of any race were 3.9% of the population.

There were 1,732 households, out of which 28.6% had children under the age of 18 living with them, 46.8% were married couples living together, 11.2% had a female householder with no husband present, and 35.2% were non-families. 27.3% of all households were made up of individuals, and 11.0% had someone living alone who was 65 years of age or older. The average household size was 2.47 and the average family size was 2.99.

In the town, the population was spread out, with 26.7% under the age of 20, 5.2% from 20 to 24, 25.2% from 25 to 44, 28.8% from 45 to 64, and 14.0% who were 65 years of age or older. The median age was 39.9 years. For every 100 females, there were 109.4 males. For every 100 females age 18 and over, there were 110.3 males.

The median income for a household in the town was $40,194, and the median income for a family was $46,509. Males had a median income of $39,350 versus $38,587 for females. The per capita income for the town was $20,306. About 9.1% of families and 14.1% of the population were below the poverty line, including 17.9% of those under age 18 and 5.7% of those age 65 or over.

=== Housing ===
There were 2,273 housing units at an average density of 56.5 per square mile (21.8/km^{2}). 23.8% of housing units were vacant.

There were 1,732 occupied housing units in the town. 1,265 were owner-occupied units (73.0%), while 467 were renter-occupied (27.0%). The homeowner vacancy rate was 1.9% of total units. The rental unit vacancy rate was 8.7%.

NOTE: It is common for resort communities to have higher than normal vacant house counts. Many are vacation homes which are seasonal and not regularly occupied.

== Government ==
- Town Supervisor: Lynn Chatfield
- Town Clerk: Jesse Chatfield
- Town Justice: Roger Misso
- Town Justice: Larry Mattle
- Councilman: Adam Ellis Jr.
- Councilman: Dan Youngman
- Councilwoman: Julie Aldrich
- Councilwoman: Cindee Mieden
- Assessor: Kelsey Roberts
- Superintendent of Highways: Zachary Decker
- Code Enforcement Officer: Ray Hauss
- Animal Control Officer: Gary Mettler

== Communities and locations in the Town of Wolcott ==
- Blind Sodus Bay – A bay of Lake Ontario in the northeast part of the town. The bay is not open to the lake due to a spit of land that closes it off, forming a fresh water lagoon.
- Desbrough Park – A hamlet near Lake Ontario on the east side of Port Bay.
- Duncans Corners – A location near the east town line on County Road 167.
- Furnace Village – A hamlet on the west town line north of Wolcott village. This community was important in the production of iron in the 19th century.
- Lake Shore Marshes Wildlife Management Area – Three conservation areas in the north part of the town.
- North Wolcott – A hamlet in the north central part of the town.
- Port Bay – A bay of Lake Ontario north of Wolcott village.
- Red Creek – The Village of Red Creek is at the east town line on NY-104.
- Wolcott – The Village of Wolcott is near the west town line.
- Wolcott Creek – A stream flowing past Wolcott village and Furnace Village into Port Bay.
- Yellow Red Corners – A location in the southeast part of the town, now at the present intersection of NY-370 and Ridge Road (County Road 163).
