= New York State Route 104A =

State highway in central New York, US

New York State Route 104A
- Map of central New York with NY 104A highlighted in red

Route information
- Auxiliary route of NY 104
- Maintained by NYSDOT
- Length: 17.38 mi (27.97 km)
- Existed: April 1935–present
- Tourist routes: Great Lakes Seaway Trail

Major junctions
- South end: NY 104 / NY 370 near Red Creek
- North end: NY 104 in Oswego

Location
- Country: United States
- State: New York
- Counties: Wayne, Cayuga, Oswego

Highway system
- New York Highways; Interstate; US; State; Reference; Parkways
← NY 104	→ NY 104B

New York State Route 104A (NY 104A) is a northeast–southwest (signed as north–south) state highway in the central portion of New York in the United States. It serves as a northerly alternate route of NY 104, to which it connects at each end. The route extends for 17.38 miles (27.97 km) from an intersection with NY 104 and NY 370 south of the village of Red Creek in Wayne County to a junction with NY 104 southwest of the city of Oswego. NY 104A spans three counties, serves two villages (Red Creek and Fair Haven) and parallels Lake Ontario for much of its length. All of NY 104A is part of the Seaway Trail, a National Scenic Byway.

All of NY 104A was originally part of Route 30, an unsigned legislative route, during the early 20th century. In 1924, modern NY 104A became part of NY 3, then a cross-state highway that continued west to Niagara County. U.S. Route 104 (US 104) replaced most of NY 3 between Rochester and Maple View in April 1935. From Red Creek to Oswego, however, US 104 used a more southeasterly alignment via Hannibal. The Red Creek–Oswego segment of NY 3 became NY 104A instead.

== Route description ==
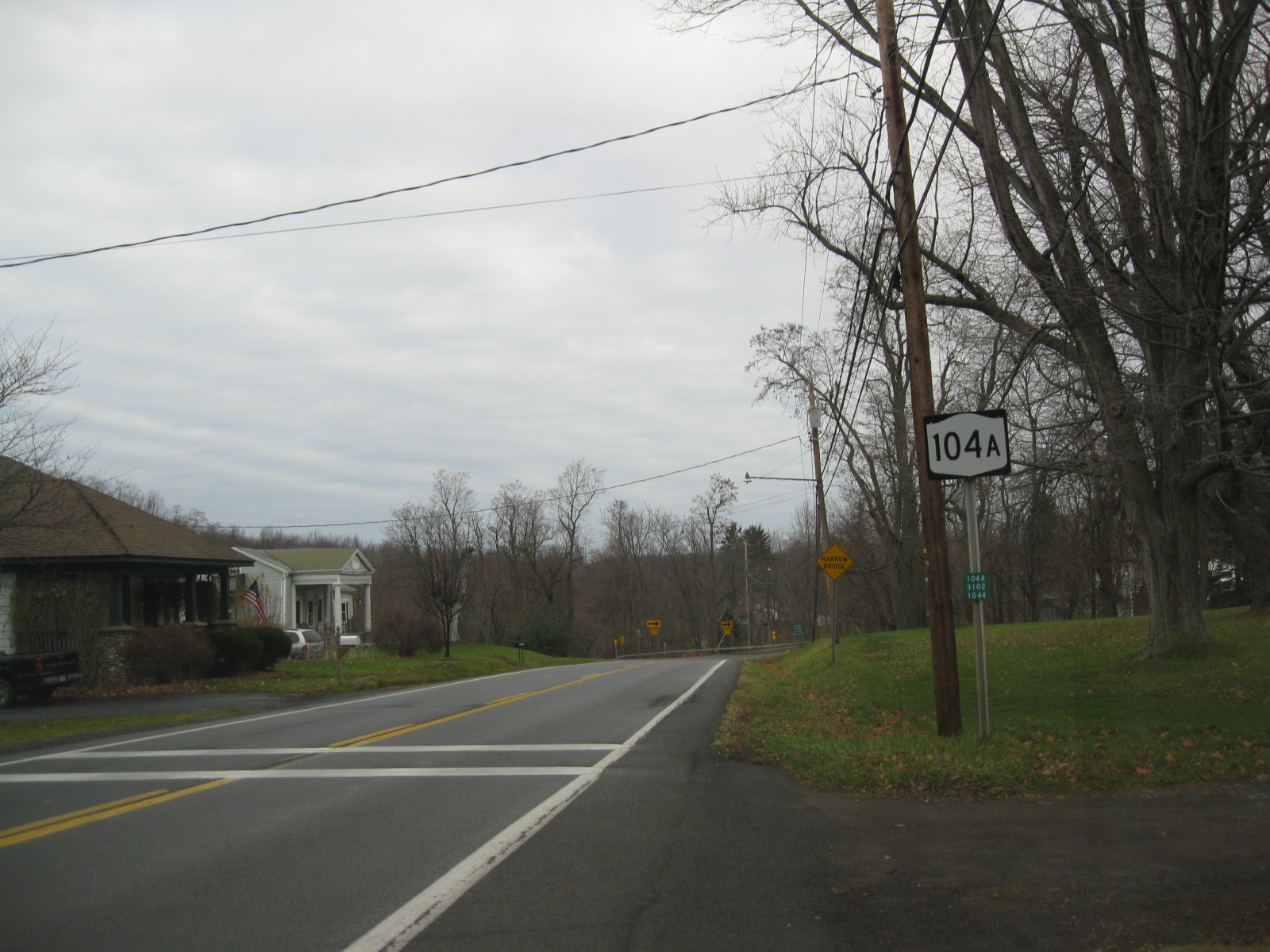
NY 104A northbound through the hamlet of Sterling

NY 104A begins at a rural intersection with NY 104 and NY 370 southwest of the village of Red Creek. While NY 370 heads south from the junction to begin its trek east toward Syracuse, NY 104A travels to the north, initially traversing a mostly undeveloped area outside of Red Creek. After 0.5 miles (0.8 km), it turns northeast to enters the village of Red Creek on Wolcott Street. The route follows Wolcott and Water Streets through the small village to its modest commercial center, where it intersects Main Street. NY 104A turns north here, following Main Street through the village's residential northern half on its way out of the village.

North of Red Creek, NY 104A continues on a northerly alignment for another 3 miles (5 km), roughly paralleling the nearby Wayne–Cayuga county line. At the end of this north–south stretch, the route curves to the northeast to enter Cayuga County and the town of Sterling. Just inside the county line is the small village of Fair Haven, where NY 104A passes Little Sodus Bay and the surrounding Fair Haven Beach State Park. While in the village, it crosses the Cato–Fair Haven Trail, a foot trail linking Fair Haven to the village of Cato 12 miles (19 km) to the southeast. East of the village, it continues on a generally linear routing across farmland to a junction with the northern terminus of NY 38. At this point, NY 104A turns back to the north, following the right-of-way of NY 38 to the hamlet of Sterling.

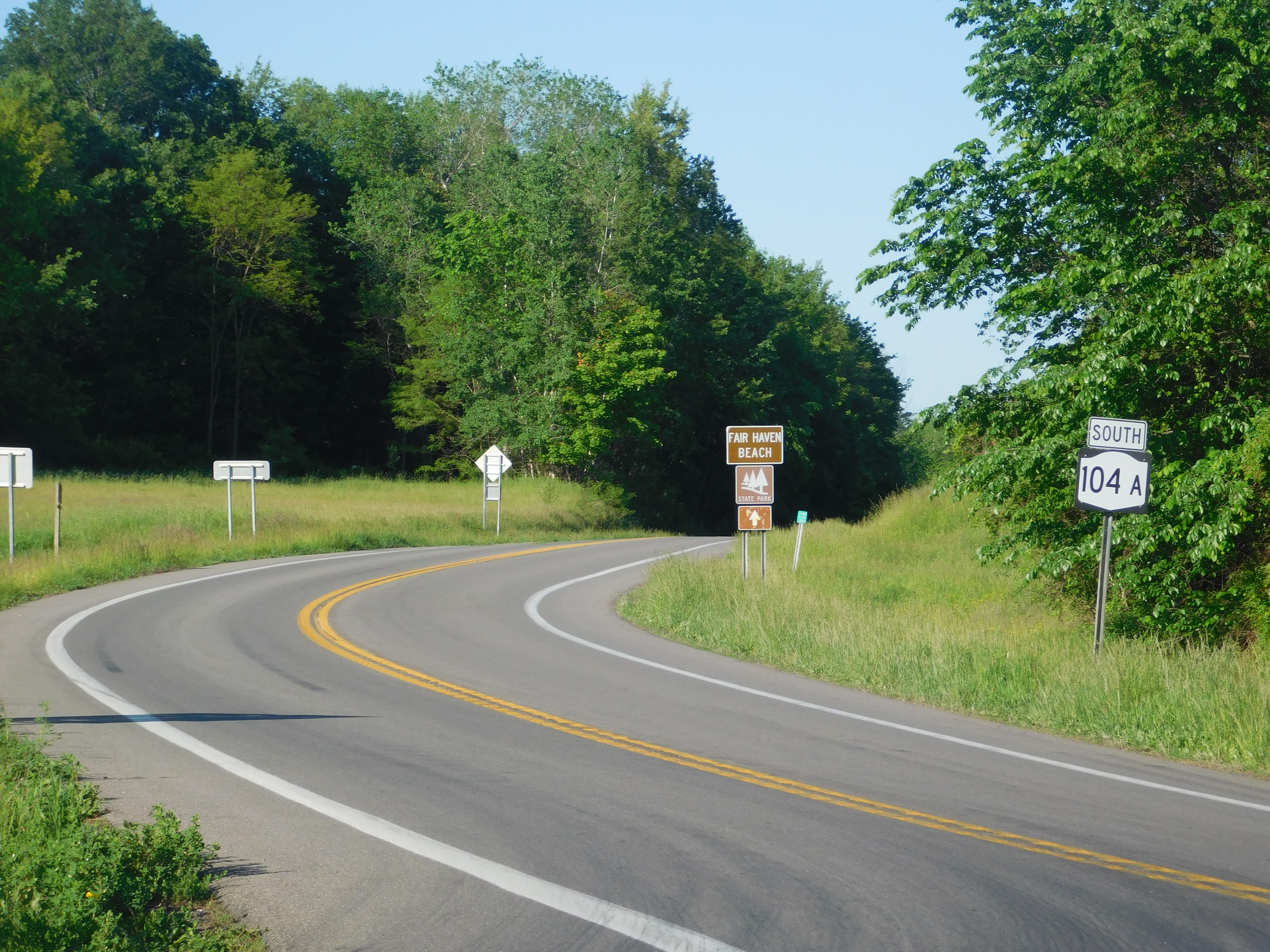
NY 104A from the junction with NY 3 in the town of Sterling

Past the hamlet, the route curves east again to meet NY 3's western terminus north of the hamlet of Crocketts. NY 104A returns to a northward alignment at this junction, paralleling another county line—this time separating Cayuga County from Oswego County—for 2.75 miles (4.43 km). The north–south alignment gradually brings NY 104A closer to Lake Ontario, which the route has loosely paralleled from Fair Haven eastward. Eventually, the route swerves to the northeast to cross into Oswego County. Here, the route passes through more farmlands and forests in the town of Oswego as it parallels the Lake Ontario shoreline 2 miles (3.2 km) to the northwest. NY 104A maintains a northeast alignment for another 3 miles (5 km) to the hamlet of Southwest Oswego, where it rejoins NY 104.

Although the portion of NY 104A from Red Creek to Sterling follows an alignment that takes it as many as 7 miles (11 km) from the lake shore, the route is still the closest continuous highway to the shoreline between Red Creek and Southwest Oswego. For this reason, all of NY 104A is part of the Seaway Trail, a National Scenic Byway that extends across most of Upstate New York. The byway continues south from Red Creek on NY 370 and east toward the city of Oswego on NY 104.

== History ==
In 1908, the New York State Legislature created Route 30, an unsigned legislative route that extended from Niagara Falls to Rouses Point. From Red Creek to Oswego, Route 30 was initially routed on modern NY 104A; however, it was realigned c. 1920 to roughly follow what is now NY 104 between the two locations. When the first set of posted routes in New York were assigned in 1924, the pre-1920 routing of legislative Route 30 between Red Creek and Oswego became part of NY 3, then a cross-state highway extending from the Niagara Frontier to the North Country.

US 104 was assigned in April 1935, extending from Niagara Falls to the town of Mexico by way of several previously numbered highways. East of Rochester, the route mostly supplanted NY 3; however, from the junction of Water and Main Streets in Red Creek to Southwest Oswego, it used much of the post-1920 routing of legislative Route 30 instead, by this time designated as NY 3F. The former routing of NY 3 between the two locations was redesignated as NY 104A. In the early 1970s, the portion of the US 104 super two between Huron and Red Creek was completed and opened to traffic. NY 104A was extended 1 mile (1.6 km) southward over US 104's former routing to meet the new highway south of the village.

== Major intersections ==
County	Location	mi	km	Destinations	Notes
Wayne	Town of Wolcott	0.00	0.00	NY 104 / NY 370 east / Great Lakes Seaway Trail – Oswego, Rochester, Syracuse	Southern terminus; western terminus of NY 370
Cayuga	Sterling	9.57	15.40	NY 38 south	Northern terminus of NY 38
Cayuga	Sterling	10.96	17.64	NY 3 east – Hannibal	Hamlet of Crocketts; western terminus of NY 3
Oswego	Town of Oswego	17.38	27.97	NY 104 / Great Lakes Seaway Trail – Rochester	Northern terminus; Hamlet of Southwest Oswego
1.000 mi = 1.609 km; 1.000 km = 0.621 mi
