= Red Creek, New York =

- Village
- Nickname: "Red Crick or The Creek."
- Location in Wayne County and the state of New York.

- Location within the state of New York
- Coordinates: 43°14′52″N 76°43′22″W
- Country: United States
- State: New York
- County: Wayne
- Town: Wolcott
- Settled: 1811
- Incorporated: 1852
- Named after: Big Red and Little Red Creeks

Government
  - Type: Board of Trustees
  - Mayor: Brooke O'Brien
  - Clerk: Martha Dygert

Area
  - Total: 0.93 sq mi (2.42 km^{2})
  - Land: 0.91 sq mi (2.35 km^{2})
  - Water: 0.027 sq mi (0.07 km^{2})
- Elevation: 341 ft (104 m)

Population (2020)
  - Total: 495
  - Density: 544.8/sq mi (210.34/km^{2})
- Time zone: UTC-5 (Eastern (EST))
  - Summer (DST): UTC-4 (EDT)
- ZIP code: 13143
- Area codes: 315 and 680
- FIPS code: 36-60829
- GNIS feature ID: 0962279
- Website: https://redcreekny.org/

Red Creek is a village in Wayne County, New York, United States. The population was 495 at the 2020 census.

The Village of Red Creek is located at the eastern edge of the Town of Wolcott and shares a border with both the Town of Sterling and Town of Victory in Cayuga County. The village is west of Syracuse and east of Rochester.

== History ==
The village was permanently settled circa 1811 and was originally called "Jacksonville" after Andrew Jackson. The name was changed to "Red Creek" in approximately 1836.

The name change was attributed to the creek which passes through its entirety. Originally, Big Red and Little Red Creeks were believed to be named from the waters color, which was tainted from passing over iron ore that richly runs throughout the water bed.

Local lore explains the origin of the name Red Creek. At one time, a tannery occupied the spot on the north side of the falls. As part of the tanning process, dye was used to tan skins. Dye was disposed of in the pond which then flowed over the dam's falls, discoloring it red.

The village was incorporated in 1852. In 1874, most of the business district was consumed by fire.

== Geography ==
Red Creek is located at 43°14′52″N 76°43′22″W (43.247848, -76.722786).

According to the United States Census Bureau, the village has a total area of 0.9 square miles (2.3 km^{2}), of which 0.9 square miles (2.3 km^{2}) is land and 0.04 square miles (0.10 km^{2}) (2.13%) is water.

The village is at the border of Cayuga County.

Red Creek is also the name of the creek that flows through the community, and dammed to form a small pond on the south edge of the village.

New York State Route 104A passes through the village in a north–south direction as "Wolcott Street," "Water Street," and "Main Street."

== Demographics ==
Historical population
Census	Pop.	Note	%±
1880	525		—
1890	492		−6.3%
1900	480		−2.4%
1910	457		−4.8%
1920	490		7.2%
1930	560		14.3%
1940	539		−3.7%
1950	617		14.5%
1960	689		11.7%
1970	626		−9.1%
1980	645		3.0%
1990	566		−12.2%
2000	521		−8.0%
2010	532		2.1%
2020	495		−7.0%
U.S. Decennial Census

As of the census of 2020, there were 495 people, 230 households, and 180 families residing in the village. The population density was 550 inhabitants per square mile (210/km^{2}). The racial makeup of the village was 93.5% White, 1.0% Black or African American, 0.2% Native American, 0.2% Asian, 0.0% Pacific Islander, 0.4% from other races, and 4.6% from two or more races. Hispanic or Latino of any race were 1.4% of the population.

There were 230 households, out of which 45.6% had children under the age of 18 living with them, 40.4% were married couples living together, 33.5% had a female householder with no spouse present, 7.8% had a male householder with no spouse present, and 21.7% were non-families. 14.8% of all households were made up of individuals, and 2.6% had someone living alone who was 65 years of age or older. The average household size was 3.12 and the average family size was 2.98.

In the village, the population was spread out, with 40.8% under the age of 20, 4.2% from 20 to 24, 29.6% from 25 to 44, 18.4% from 45 to 64, and 7.1% who were 65 years of age or older. The median age was 27.6 years. For every 100 females, there were 84.1 males.

The median income for a household in the village was $62,857, and the median income for a family was $68,125. Males had a median income of $60,759 versus $29,167 for females. The per capita income for the village was $72,240. About 12.8% of families and 19.4% of the population were below the poverty line, including 7.2% of those under age 18.

=== Housing ===
There were 217 housing units at an average density of 241.1 per square mile (93.1/km^{2}); a total of 15.7% of housing units were vacant.

There were 183 occupied housing units in the village, of which 158 were owner-occupied units (86.3%), while 72 were renter-occupied (39.3%). The homeowner vacancy rate was 0.0% of total units. The rental unit vacancy rate was 7.7%.

== Government ==
- Mayor: Brooke O'Brien
- Deputy Mayor: Erika Barnes
- Village Clerk/Treasurer: Martha Dygert
- Public Works Adaministrator: David Godkin
- Trustee: Mike Bettis
- Trustee: Kevin Doll
- Trustee:

== Notable people ==
- George Mangus, baseball player
- Mike Novak, basketball player
