= New York's 130th State Assembly district =

American legislative district

Assemblymember
Brian Manktelow; R–Lyons

New York's 130th State Assembly district is one of the 150 districts in the New York State Assembly. It has been represented by Brian Manktelow since 2019. In 2026, he announced that he would not seek re-election.

== Geography ==
District 130 contains portions of Monroe County, and all of Wayne County. The towns of Sodus, Ontario, Walworth, Macedon, Williamson, Palmyra, Arcadia, Lyons, Galen, Rose, Butler, Savannah, Wolcott, and Webster are included in this district.

The district is overlapped (partially) by New York's 24th and 25th congressional districts, as well as the 54th and 55th districts of the New York State Senate.

=== 2010s ===
District 130 contains portions of Cayuga and Oswego counties, and all of Wayne County. The towns of Sodus, Ontario, Walworth, Macedon, Williamson, Palmyra, Arcadia, Lyons, Galen, Rose, Butler, Savannah, Wolcott, Sterling, Victory, Conquest, Mentz, Montezuma, Aurelius, Ira, Brutus, Cato, Sennett, Oswego, Hannibal and Minetto.

== Recent election results ==
=== 2026 ===
2026 New York State Assembly election, District 130
Primary election
Party	Candidate	Votes	%
Republican	George Dobbins	2,100	39.1
Republican	Summer Johnson	1,757	32.7
Republican	Mark Johns	1,495	27.8
Write-in		21	0.4
Total votes		5,373	100.0
Democratic	Carl Fitzsimmons	2,113	50.5
Democratic	Joseph Lamanna	2,059	49.2
Write-in		9	0.3
Total votes		4,182	100.0
General election
Republican	George Dobbins		
Conservative	George Dobbins		
Total	George Dobbins		
Democratic	Carl Fitzsimmons		
Common Sense	Joseph Lamanna		
Write-in			
Total votes			100.0

=== 2024 ===
2024 New York State Assembly election, District 130
Party	Candidate	Votes	%
Republican	Brian Manktelow	37,646	
Conservative	Brian Manktelow	6,355	
Total	Brian Manktelow (incumbent)	44,001	63.7
Democratic	James Schuler	25,071	36.3
Write-in		16	0.0
Total votes		69,088	100.0
Republican hold			

=== 2022 ===
2022 New York State Assembly election, District 130
Party	Candidate	Votes	%
Republican	Brian Manktelow	29,638	
Conservative	Brian Manktelow	5,969	
Total	Brian Manktelow (incumbent)	35,607	65.9
Democratic	Scott Comegys	17,214	
Working Families	Scott Comegys	1,217	
Total	Scott Comegys	18,431	34.1
Write-in		13	0.0
Total votes		54,051	100.0
Republican hold			

=== 2020 ===
2020 New York State Assembly election, District 130
Party	Candidate	Votes	%
Republican	Brian Manktelow	34,318	
Conservative	Brian Manktelow	5,363	
Independence	Brian Manktelow	937	
Total	Brian Manktelow (incumbent)	40,618	69.0
Democratic	Scott Comegys	18,084	
SAM	Scott Comegys	142	
Total	Scott Comegys	18,226	31.0
Write-in		14	0.0
Total votes		58,858	100.0
Republican hold			

=== 2018 ===
2018 New York State Assembly election, District 130
Party	Candidate	Votes	%
Republican	Brian Manktelow	24,129	
Conservative	Brian Manktelow	4,010	
Independence	Brian Manktelow	916	
Reform	Brian Manktelow	225	
Total	Brian Manktelow	29,280	66.6
Democratic	Scott Comegys	13,878	
Working Families	Scott Comegys	801	
Total	Scott Comegys	14,679	33.4
Write-in		9	0.0
Total votes		43,968	100.0
Republican hold			

=== 2016 ===
2016 New York State Assembly election, District 130
Party	Candidate	Votes	%
Republican	Bob Oaks	36,314	
Conservative	Bob Oaks	7,881	
Total	Bob Oaks (incumbent)	44,195	99.8
Write-in		108	0.2
Total votes		44,303	100.0
Republican hold			

=== 2014 ===
2014 New York State Assembly election, District 130
Party	Candidate	Votes	%
Republican	Bob Oaks	23,278	
Conservative	Bob Oaks	6,090	
Total	Bob Oaks (incumbent)	29,368	99.7
Write-in		80	0.3
Total votes		29,448	100.0
Republican hold			

=== 2012 ===
2012 New York State Assembly election, District 130
Party	Candidate	Votes	%
Republican	Bob Oaks	32,335	
Conservative	Bob Oaks	8,134	
Total	Bob Oaks (incumbent)	40,469	99.6
Write-in		148	0.4
Total votes		40,617	100.0
Republican hold			
