= Bob Oaks =

American politician

Member of the New York State Assembly from the 130th district
- In office January 1, 1993 – December 31, 2018
- Preceded by: Michael Nozzolio
- Succeeded by: Brian Manktelow

Personal details
- Born: Robert C. Oaks; January 15, 1952 (age 74) Rochester, New York, U.S.
- Party: Republican
- Spouse: Judy
- Children: two
- Education: Colgate University; University of Montana
- Profession: politician
- Website: Official website

Robert C. Oaks (born January 15, 1952) is a former Republican member of the New York State Assembly, who represented the 130th Assembly District, which includes all of Wayne County, the towns of Sterling, Victory, Ira, Conquest, Cato, Mentz and Brutus in Cayuga County and the towns of Hannibal, Minetto, and Oswego in Oswego County.

Oaks was born in Rochester, New York and raised on a farm in North Rose, graduating from the North Rose-Wolcott Central School in 1970. He received a bachelor's degree in political science from Colgate University in 1974, followed by a master's degree in recreation administration from the University of Montana in 1976.

He became director of the continuing education program for the Greece Central School District in 1976 and was director of the Wayne County Youth Bureau from 1978 to 1983. Oaks was the Wayne County Clerk from 1983 through the end of 1992.

Oaks was first elected to the State Assembly in 1992. He ran uncontested in the November 2008 and November 2010 general elections. He did not seek reelection in 2018.

He and his wife Judy reside in Macedon, New York. They have two sons, Christopher and Jason.
