= Wayne Center, New York =

Hamlet in New York, United States

Coordinates: 43°09′03″N 76°57′32″W

Wayne Center is a hamlet in the Town of Rose, Wayne County, New York, United States, located near the Lyons town line. It is located four miles (6.4 km) west of the hamlet of Rose and eight miles (13 km) north-northeast of the hamlet of Lyons, at an elevation of 430 feet (130 m). The primary cross roads where the hamlet is located are Wayne Center Road (CR 248), Wayne Center-Rose Road (CR 251) and Ackerman Road.

Although the name is derived from its central position in Wayne County, the hamlet is actually located east of the geographic center.
