= Rose (hamlet), New York =

Hamlet in New York, United States

Coordinates: 43°09′13″N 76°52′43″W

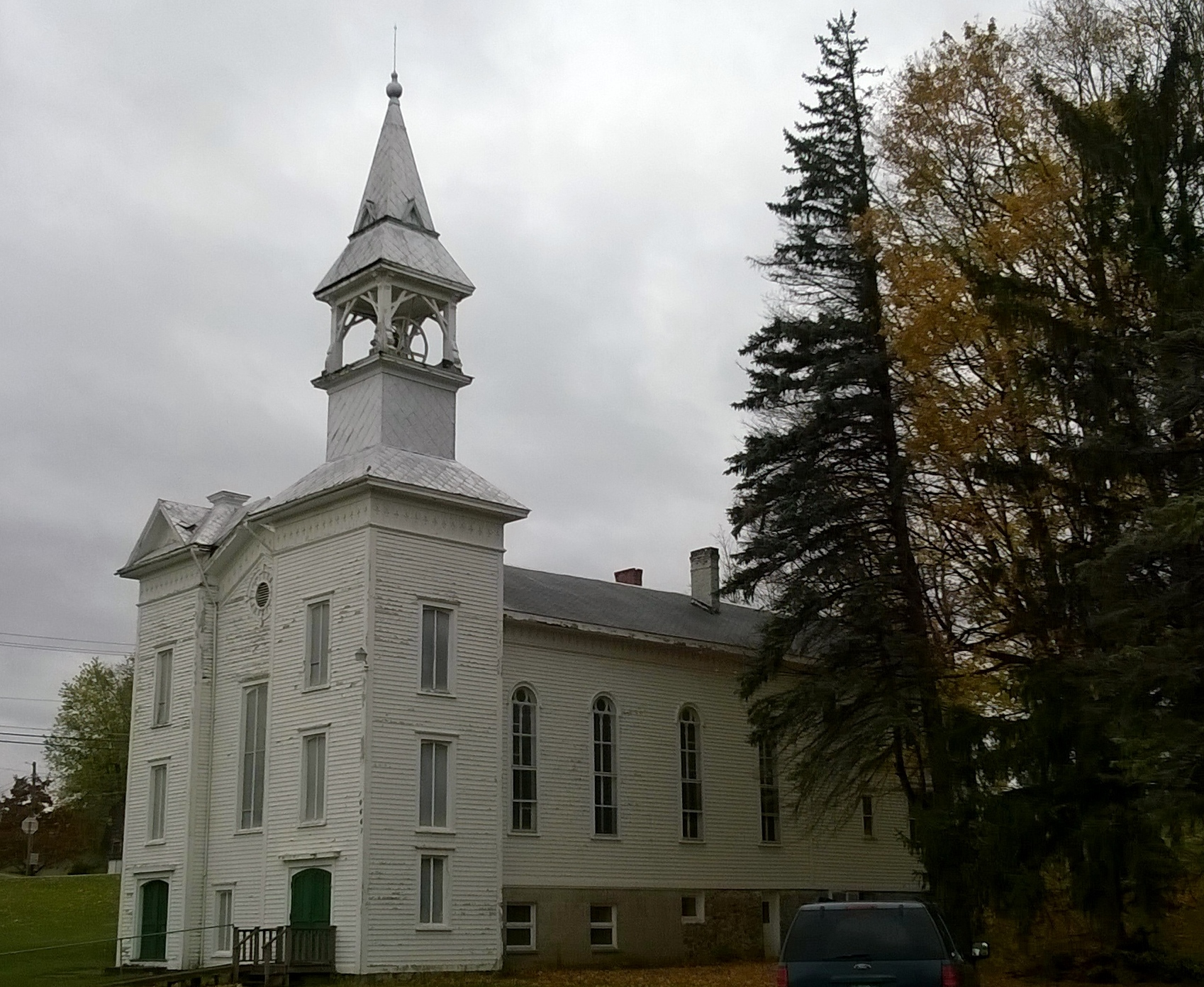
Rose Baptist Church in the hamlet of Rose

Rose is a hamlet in the Town of Rose, Wayne County, New York, United States. It is located five miles (8 km) north of the Village of Clyde and three miles (8 km) south-southeast of the hamlet of North Rose, at an elevation of 420 feet (128 m). The primary cross roads where the hamlet is located are N.Y. Route 414, Wayne Center-Rose Road (CR 251) and Wolcott Road (CR 255).

A United States Post Office is located in Rose with a ZIP Code of 14542.

The Bernard Farnsworth Museum is located at the Rose Community Center in the hamlet. It exhibits a number of items throughout the town's history. The building was formerly Rose Elementary School.
