= Lock Berlin, New York =

Hamlet in New York, United States

Coordinates: 43°04′44″N 76°56′46″W

Lock Berlin is a hamlet in the Town of Galen, Wayne County, New York, United States. It is located four miles (6 km) west of the Village of Clyde and three miles (5 km) northeast of the hamlet of Lyons, at an elevation of 404 feet (123 m). The primary cross roads where the hamlet is located are Old Route 31, Stokes Road, Lock Berlin Road (CR 245) and Maple Street. N.Y. Route 31 passes just south of Lock Berlin.

Remnants of the former Enlarged Erie Canal Lock 54 (also called the Berlin Lock) are located at Lock Berlin Park on the corner of Gansz Road and Peters Road, just off N.Y. Route 31. It was a double-chamber lock built in 1841, and had a lift of 7.70 feet (2.35 m) to the west.
