= Newark Central School District =

School district in the U.S. state of New York

Address
- 100 East Miller Street Newark, New York, 14513; United States
- Coordinates: 43°2′46″N 77°5′37″W

District information
- Type: Public
- Grades: PreK–12
- NCES District ID: 3620640

Students and staff
- Students: 2,068 (2020–2021)
- Teachers: 202.78 (on an FTE basis)
- Staff: 260.21 (on an FTE basis)
- Student–teacher ratio: 10.2:1

Other information
- Website: www.newarkcsd.org

The Newark Central School District is a public school district in New York State that serves approximately 2300 students in the village of Newark and the town of Arcadia in Wayne County with a staff of 270.

The average class size is 21 students (all grades). The student-teacher ratio is 11-13:1(elementary), 12:1(middle school), 14:1(high school).

Susan Hasenauer is the Superintendent of Schools.

== Board of education ==
The Board of Education (BOE) consists of 7 members who serve rotating 3-year terms. Elections are held each May for board members and to vote on the School District Budget.

Current board members are:

- Brad Steve - President - 2-Year Term - July 1, 2021 - 2023
- Julie Nevelizer - Vice President - 3-Year Term - July 1, 2021 - 2024
- Russell Harris - 3-Year Term - July 1, 2020 - 2023
- Miranda Brooks-Ruggeri - 3-Year Term - July 1, 2022 - 2025
- Mary Thoms - 3-Year Term - July 1, 2022 - 2025
- Matt Burgess - 3-Year Term - July 1, 2021 - 2024
- Scott Verbridge - 3-Year Term - July 1, 2021 - 2024

== Schools ==
The district operates three elementary, one middle and one high school. There is also a preschool in the district which is operated by ARC of Wayne.

=== Elementary schools ===
- Lincoln Elementary School (UPK-2), Principal - Kari Hamelinck
- Perkins Elementary School (UPK-2), Principal - Peter Czerkas
- Norman R Kelley Intermediate School (3-5), Principal - Christina Sullivan

=== Middle school ===
- Newark Middle School (6-8), Principal - Melanie Meyers

=== High school ===
- Newark High School (9-12), Principal - Kelly Zielke

== Performance ==
The district's 82% graduation rate exceeds the State Standard of 55%. Approximately 72% of students continue to post-secondary education; 30% of the class of 2006 enrolled in four-year colleges.
