= George Dobbins =

American politician

Member-elect of the New York State Assembly from the 130th district
- Assuming office January 2027
- Succeeding: Brian Manktelow

Personal details
- Born: August 1, 1994 (age 32)
- Party: Republican
- Education: George Washington University, B.A. University College London Georgetown University Law Center, J.D.

George Dobbins is an American politician. A member of the Republican Party, he is the member-elect for the 130th district of the New York State Assembly.
