= Brian Manktelow =

American politician

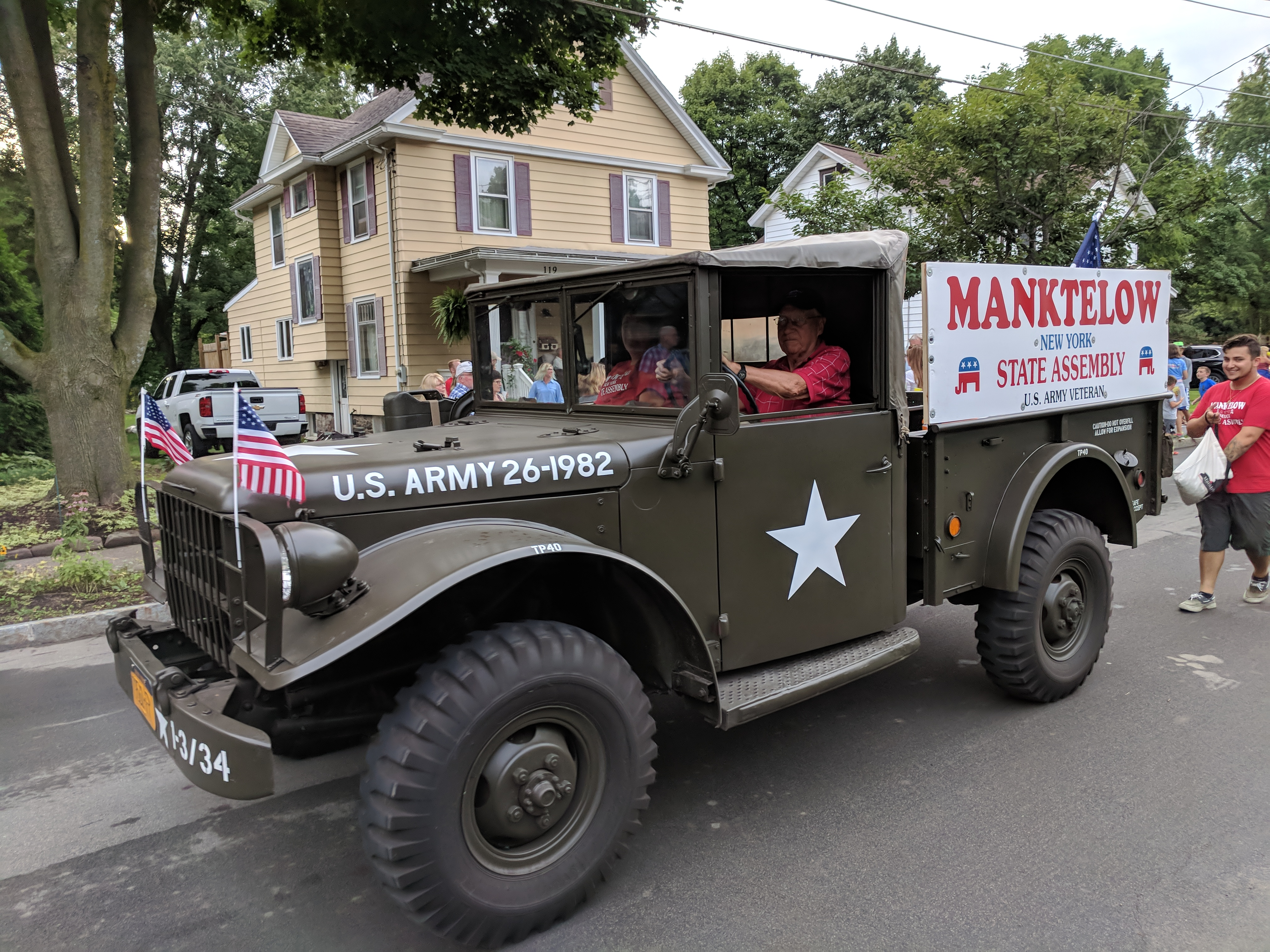

Member of the New York State Assembly from the 130th district
- Incumbent
- Assumed office January 9, 2019
- Preceded by: Bob Oaks
- Succeeded by: George Dobbins (elect)

Personal details
- Born: July 26, 1963 (age 63)
- Party: Republican
- Spouse: Crystal
- Children: 5
- Website: Official website

Brian Manktelow is an American politician and farmer from the state of New York. A Republican, Manktelow has represented the 130th district of the New York State Assembly, based in Wayne County along Lake Ontario, since 2019.

== Career ==
After graduating high school, Manktelow served in the U.S. Army, achieving the rank of sergeant. When he returned, Manktelow took classes at the University of Chicago and Finger Lakes Community College, but did not attain degrees from either.

Manktelow has also been the owner and operator of Manktelow Farms for 30 years.

== Electoral history ==
In 2009, Manktelow was elected Lyons Town Supervisor, a position he held until 2018.

Manktelow ran in 2016 for New York's 54th State Senate district, vacated by retiring Republican Michael F. Nozzolio. He came in third in the primary, behind Floyd Rayburn and eventual winner Pam Helming.

After longtime State Assemblyman Bob Oaks announced his retirement in 2018, Manktelow launched his campaign for the 130th Assembly district. He won the primary uncontested, and defeated Democrat Scott Comegys in the general election with 67% of the vote.

== Personal life ==
Manktelow lives in Lyons with his wife, Crystal, and their five children.
