= Marengo, New York =

Hamlet in New York, United States

Coordinates: 43°01′33″N 76°54′38″W

Marengo is a hamlet in the Town of Galen, Wayne County, New York, United States, located near the Seneca County line. It is located six miles (10 km) southwest of the Village of Clyde, at an elevation of 420 feet (128 m). The primary intersection in the hamlet is at Clyde-Marengo Road (CR 346) and Lyons-Marengo Road (CR 334).

Marengo is at the southern end of the Marengo Marsh, part of the Clyde River basin.
