= Smith-Ely Mansion =

Historic house in New York, United States

- U.S. National Register of Historic Places
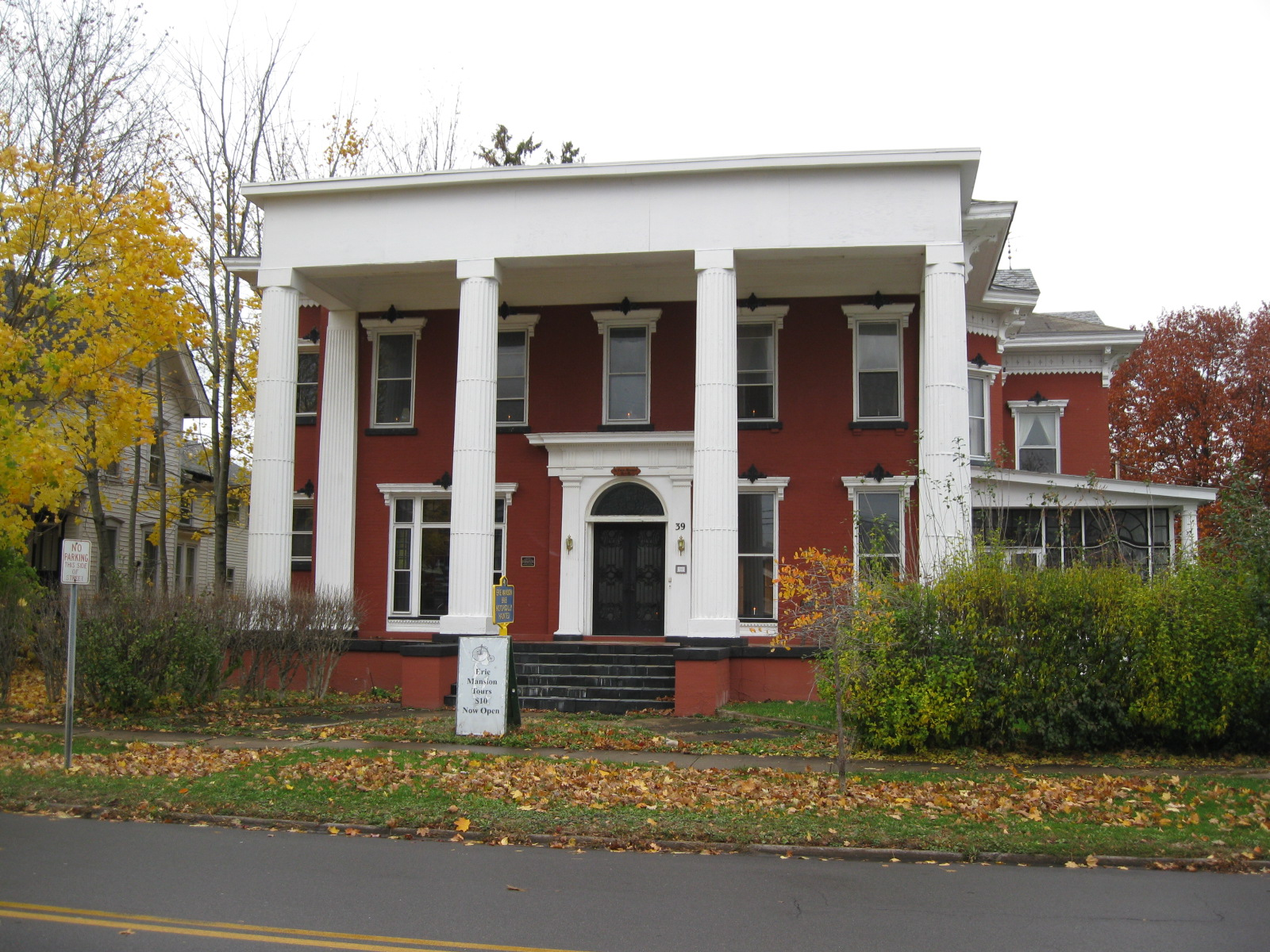
- Smith-Ely Mansion, October 2009

- Location within New York Location within the United States
- Location: 39 W. Genesee St., Clyde, New York
- Coordinates: 43°5′7″N 76°52′25″W
- Area: 0.3 acres (0.12 ha)
- Built: 1858
- Architectural style: Classical Revival
- NRHP reference No.: 92000032
- Added to NRHP: February 10, 1992

Smith-Ely Mansion is a historic home located at Clyde in Wayne County, New York. It is a large, 2½-story brick masonry residence featuring elements of the Classical Revival style. The original house was built about 1850 and extensively altered in 1875–1877. That renovation added an extensive verandah and 3-story tower. The front is dominated by a colossal, four-columned portico added during a renovation dated to 1908–1911.

The Erie Mansion has been known through the years as the Smith-Ely Mansion. Today it has been transformed into a bed and breakfast and renamed The Erie Mansion.

It was listed on the National Register of Historic Places in 1992.
