= United States Post Office (Clyde, New York) =

- US Post Office-Clyde
- U.S. National Register of Historic Places
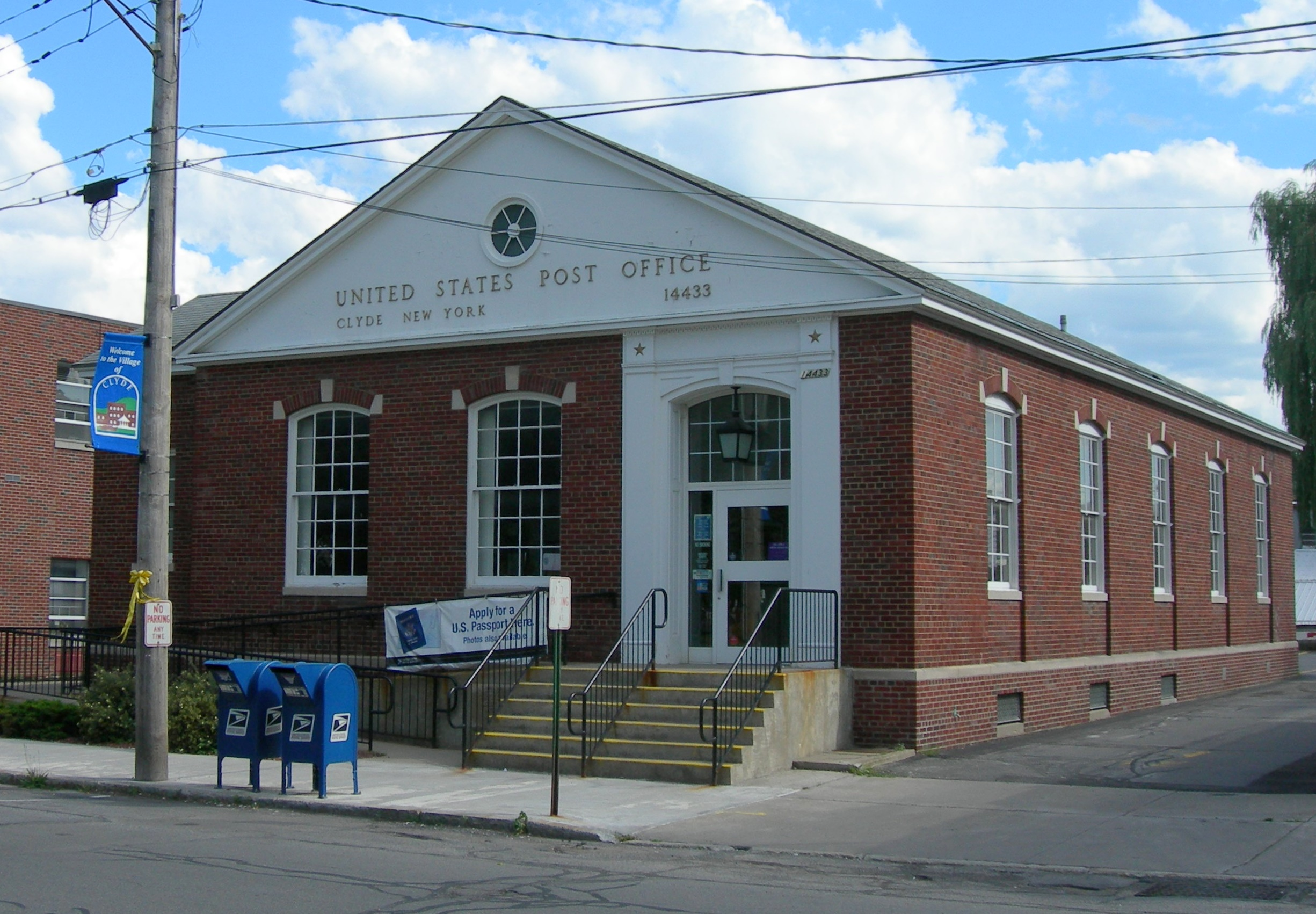
- U.S. Post Office, Clyde NY, July 2008

- Location within New York Location within the United States
- Interactive map showing the location of the U.S. Post Office-Clyde
- Location: 26 S. Park St., Clyde, New York
- Coordinates: 43°5′1″N 76°52′16″W
- Area: less than one acre
- Built: 1940
- Architect: Simon, Louis A.; Donnelly, Thomas
- Architectural style: Colonial Revival
- MPS: US Post Offices in New York State, 1858–1943, TR
- NRHP reference No.: 88002472
- Added to NRHP: November 17, 1988

US Post Office-Clyde is a historic post office building located at Clyde in Wayne County, New York. It was designed and built in 1940–1941 and is one of a number of post offices in New York State designed by the Office of the Supervising Architect of the Treasury Department, Louis A. Simon. It is a 1 1/2-story steel-framed, brick building on a raised foundation with a limestone watercourse, in the Colonial Revival style. The interior features a mural by artist Thomas Donnelly executed in 1941 and titled Apple Pickers.

It was listed on the National Register of Historic Places in 1988.
