= Zurich Bog =

Bog in Arcadia, New York

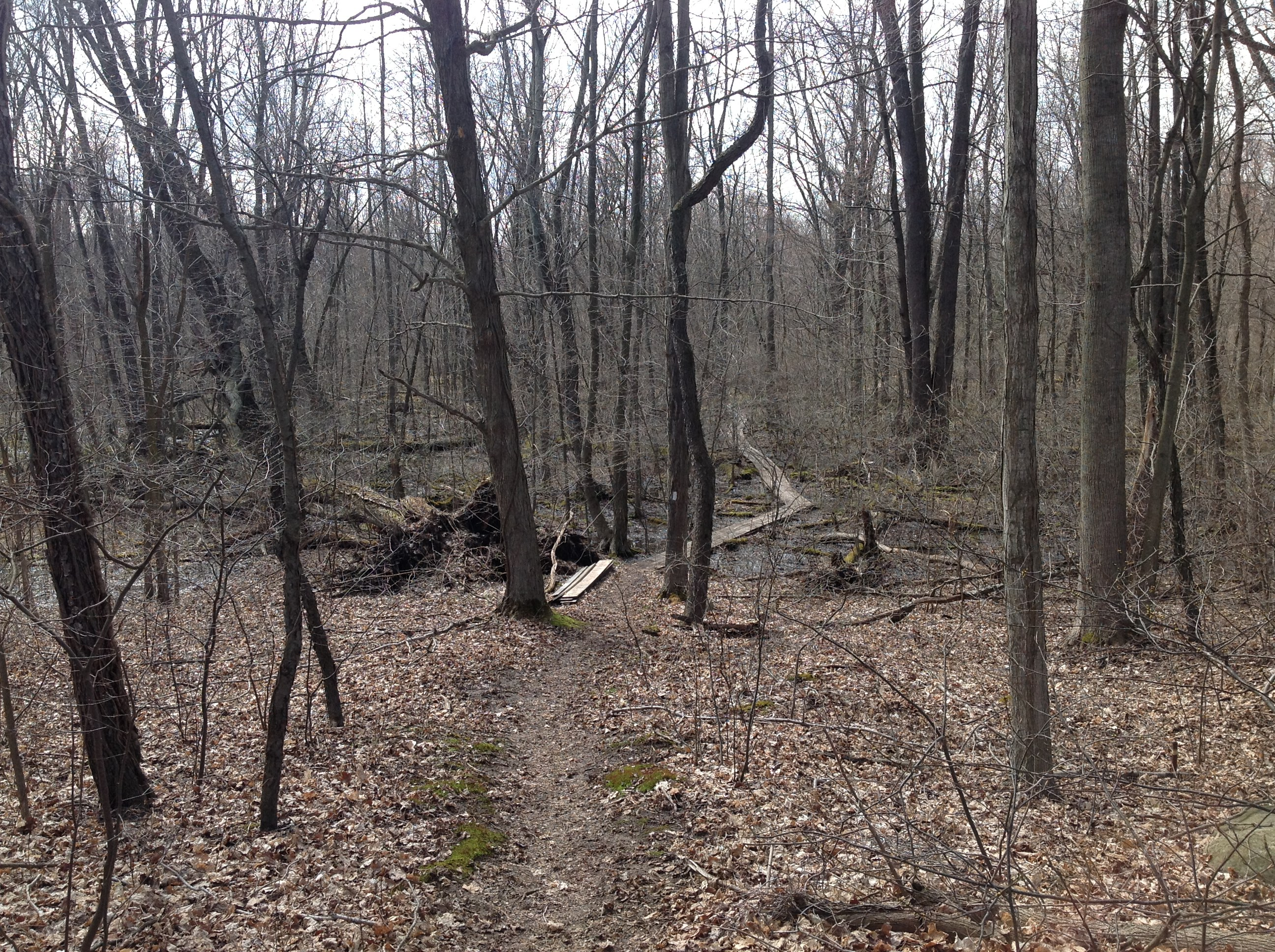
- Zurich Bog in Arcadia, New York

- Location within New York
- Location: Arcadia, Wayne County, New York
- Nearest city: Newark
- Coordinates: 43.144648°N 77.050467°W
- Area: 490 acres (2.0 km^{2})
- Established: 1957

U.S. National Natural Landmark
- Designated: 1973

Zurich Bog is a 490-acre (2.0 km^{2}) sphagnum bog in Arcadia, New York. Lyman Stuart and the Newark School District donated the land on December 10, 1957 to the Bergen Swamp Preservation Society which had been created in 1935 to preserve the similar Bergen-Byron Swamp. The bog has been the focus of scientific interest since the 19th century, and was declared a National Natural Landmark in May 1973.

== See also ==
- List of National Natural Landmarks in New York
