= Rose, New York =

- Town
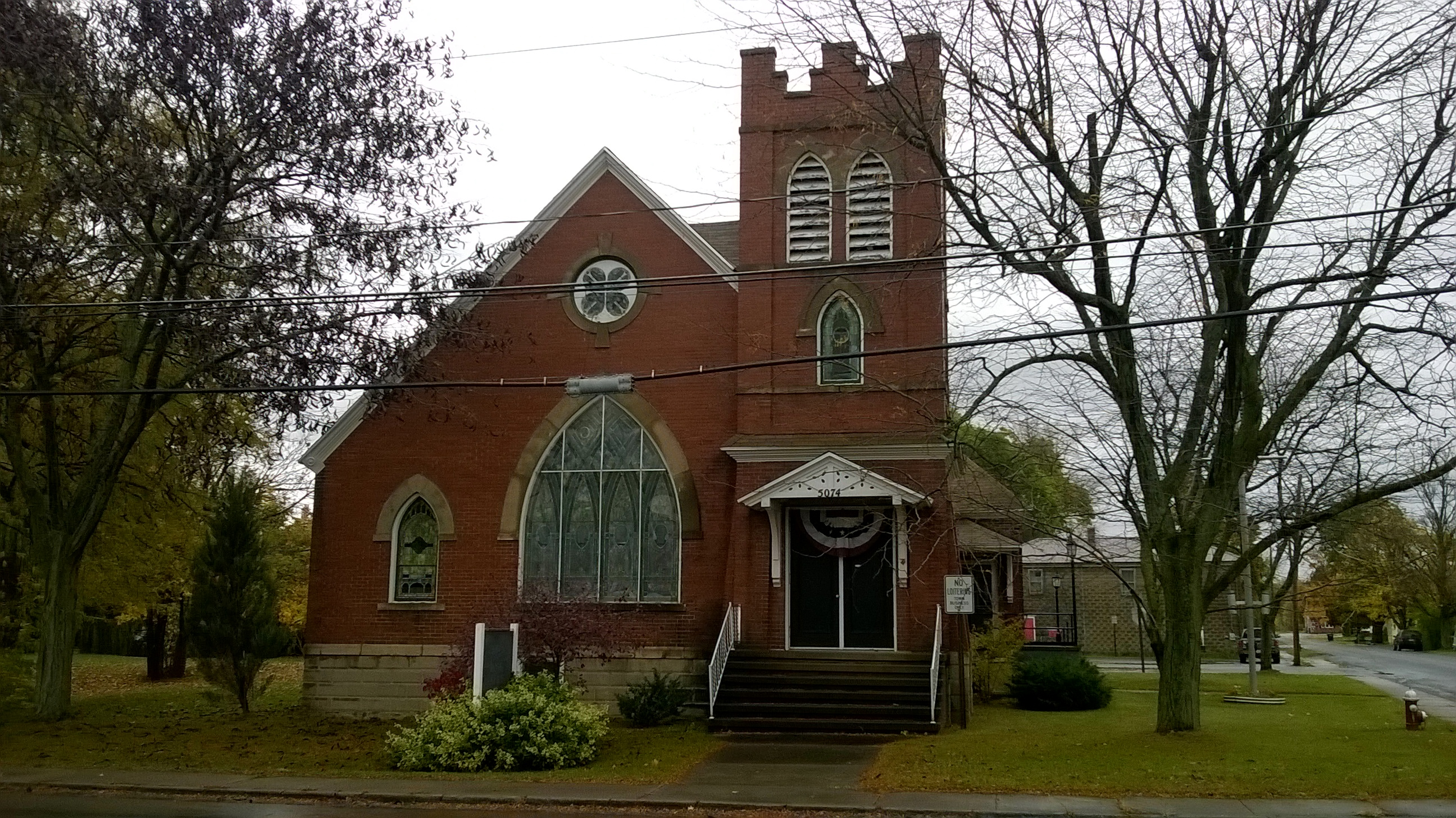
- Rose Town Hall

- Location in Wayne County and the state of New York.

- Location within the state of New York
- Coordinates: 43°9′47″N 76°53′13″W
- Country: United States
- State: New York
- County: Wayne
- Settled: 1805
- Established: February 5, 1826

Government
  - Type: Town Board
  - Supervisor: Richard Lasher
  - Clerk: Christine M. Smith
  - Court: Justice Whitney Ferguson; Justice Diane Smith

Area
  - Total: 33.90 sq mi (87.81 km^{2})
  - Land: 33.90 sq mi (87.79 km^{2})
  - Water: 0.0077 sq mi (0.02 km^{2})
- Elevation: 400 ft (122 m)

Population (2010)
  - Total: 2,369
  - Estimate (2016): 2,292
  - Density: 67.6/sq mi (26.11/km^{2})
- Time zone: UTC-5 (Eastern (EST))
  - Summer (DST): UTC-4 (EDT)
- ZIP code: 14516 (North Rose); 14542 (Rose)
- Area code: 315
- FIPS code: 36-63605
- GNIS feature ID: 0979433
- Website: https://roseny.gov/

Rose is a town in Wayne County, New York, United States. The population was 2,369 at the 2010 census. The town was named after Robert S. Rose, an early landowner of the town.

The Town of Rose is an interior town of the county, located near the county center; it is west of Syracuse, New York.

Two post offices are located in Town of Rose although the area is covered by four postal districts. Most addresses within the northern section have a primary ZIP Code of 14516 for North Rose. Only the immediate hamlet of Rose has a ZIP Code of 14542 for Rose. Much of the southern section either has a ZIP Code of 14433 for Clyde or a ZIP Code of 14489 for Lyons.

Government offices for the town are located in North Rose.

== History ==
The town was first settled around 1805.

The Town of Rose was created in 1826 from the Town of Wolcott. About 1840 a mass delusion took over the local inhabitants, and they came to believe that a treasure of gold and jewels was buried within the town. In spite of many secret, nocturnal excavations, nothing was ever found.

== Geography ==
According to the United States Census Bureau, the town has a total area of 33.9 square miles (88 km^{2}), of which 33.9 square miles (88 km^{2}) is land and 0.03% is water.

New York State Route 414 is a north–south highway through the town.

Sodus Creek flows northward through the town to Sodus Bay.

== Demographics ==
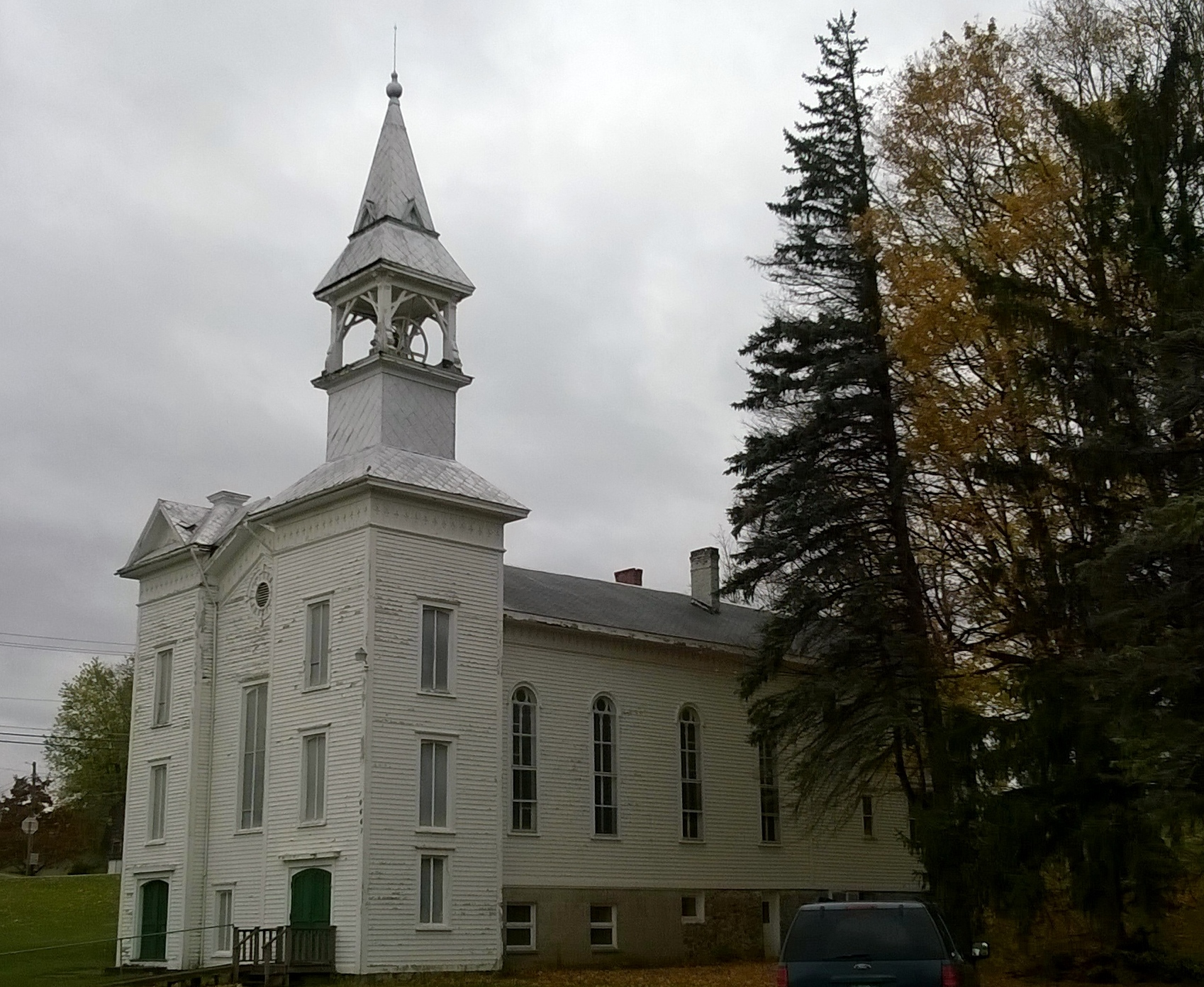
Rose Baptist Church in the hamlet of Rose

Historical population
Census	Pop.	Note	%±
1830	1,641		—
1840	2,038		24.2%
1850	2,264		11.1%
1860	2,119		−6.4%
1870	2,056		−3.0%
1880	2,244		9.1%
1890	2,107		−6.1%
1900	2,055		−2.5%
1910	1,883		−8.4%
1920	1,928		2.4%
1930	1,921		−0.4%
1940	1,882		−2.0%
1950	2,013		7.0%
1960	2,122		5.4%
1970	2,356		11.0%
1980	2,684		13.9%
1990	2,424		−9.7%
2000	2,442		0.7%
2010	2,369		−3.0%
2016 (est.)	2,292		−3.3%
U.S. Decennial Census

As of the census of 2010, there were 2,369 people, 904 households, and 646 families residing in the town. The population density was 69.9 inhabitants per square mile (27.0/km^{2}). There were 982 housing units at an average density of 29.0 units per square mile (11.2 units/km^{2}). The racial makeup of the town was 95.4% White, 0.5% Black or African American, 0.5% Native American, 0.2% Asian, 0.0% Pacific Islander, 0.9% from other races, and 2.4% from two or more races. Hispanic or Latino of any race were 3.3% of the population.

There were 904 households, out of which 27.7% had children under the age of 18 living with them, 56.0% were married couples living together, 9.2% had a female householder with no husband present, and 28.5% were non-families. 20.9% of all households were made up of individuals, and 11.3% had someone living alone who was 65 years of age or older. The average household size was 2.61 and the average family size was 3.02.

In the town, the population was spread out, with 25.4% under the age of 20, 6.0% from 20 to 24, 21.5% from 25 to 44, 30.6% from 45 to 64, and 16.6% who were 65 years of age or older. The median age was 43.4 years. For every 100 females, there were 93.2 males. For every 100 females age 18 and over, there were 94.8 males.

The median income for a household in the town was $52,984, and the median income for a family was $58,060. Males had a median income of $51,488 versus $28,261 for females. The per capita income for the town was $24,601. About 5.4% of families and 8.7% of the population were below the poverty line, including 13.1% of those under age 18 and 4.7% of those age 65 or over.

=== Housing ===
There were 982 housing units at an average density of 29.0 units per square mile (11.2 units/km^{2}); a total of 7.9% of housing units were vacant.

There were 904 occupied housing units in the town, of which 753 were owner-occupied units (83.3%), while 151 were renter-occupied (16.7%). The homeowner vacancy rate was 1.7% of total units. The rental unit vacancy rate was 5.6%.

== Communities and locations in the Town of Rose ==
- Glenmark (formerly "Glenmark Falls") — A hamlet near the north town line and northwest of North Rose.
- Lockwood Corners — A location in the eastern part of the town, south of Stewart Corners on County Road 253.
- Maunders Corners — A location south of Rose village on NY-414.
- North Rose (formerly "Lambs Corners") — A hamlet north of Rose village on NY-414. It prospered to the detriment of Rose village because North Rose had a railroad station.
- Rose (formerly "Valentine," "Albion," and "Rose Valley") — The hamlet of Rose on NY-414. It was first settled around 1811.
- Rose Center — A former location in the town.
- Stewart Corners — A location near the east town line on County Road 259.
- Wayne Center — A hamlet near the west town line on County Road 251. The name is derived from its location near the center of the county.
