= Marbletown, Wayne County, New York =

Hamlet in New York, United States

Coordinates: 43°01′14″N 77°03′59″W

Marbletown is a hamlet in the Town of Arcadia, Wayne County, New York, United States, near the Ontario County line. It is located three miles (5 km) southeast of the Village of Newark, at an elevation of 486 feet (148 m). The primary cross roads where the hamlet is located are Marbletown Road (CR 336), Silver Hill Road and Miller Road.

Marbletown Schoolhouse (built 1876), a historic building, is located on the corner of Marbletown Road and Miller Road. The school served as an educational place for area children until it closed in 1947.
