= Galen, New York =

- Town
- Location in Wayne County and the state of New York.

- Location within the state of New York
- Coordinates: 43°4′3″N 76°52′49″W
- Country: United States
- State: New York
- County: Wayne
- Settled: 1800
- Established: February 14, 1812

Government
  - Type: Town Board
  - Supervisor: Steven J. Groat
  - Clerk: Norma Lancaster
  - Court: Justice Lester Carr Sr. Justice Carol Heald

Area
  - Total: 60.06 sq mi (155.55 km^{2})
  - Land: 59.48 sq mi (154.05 km^{2})
  - Water: 0.58 sq mi (1.50 km^{2})
- Elevation: 400 ft (122 m)

Population (2010)
  - Total: 4,290
  - Estimate (2016): 4,126
  - Density: 69.4/sq mi (26.78/km^{2})
- Time zone: UTC-5 (Eastern (EST))
  - Summer (DST): UTC-4 (EDT)
- Area codes: 315 and 680
- FIPS code: 36-28013
- GNIS feature ID: 0978983
- Website: https://galenny.gov/

Galen is a town in Wayne County, New York, United States. The population was 4,290 at the 2010 census. The town is named after the classical physician Galen.

The Town of Galen is on the south border of the county and west of Syracuse, New York.

The primary postal district covering the Town of Galen is ZIP Code 14433 for Clyde.

== History ==
Before the French and Indian War, there was a French block house and trading post near Clyde.

The town was first settled around 1800 near Marengo.

The town was part of a tract set aside for physicians and surgeons of the Colonial Army as part of the Central New York Military Tract used to pay soldiers of the American Revolution. Galen was formed from the Town of Junius in Seneca County in 1812 and became part of Wayne County in 1823, but lost part of its area to form the Town of Savannah in 1824.

The glass industry was important during the early history of Galen.

Remnants of the former Enlarged Erie Canal Lock 53 (also called the Clyde Lock) are located near the corner of N.Y. Route 31 and Old Route 31, just west of the Village of Clyde. It was built in 1841 as a single-chamber lock, but doubled in 1874. The lock had a lift of 4.63 feet (1.41 m) to the west. It currently sits on private property.

The town is part of the Erie Canalway National Heritage Corridor. Erie Canal Lock 26 is located at the end of Lock Road, off Tyre Road (CR 372) southeast of Clyde. It was built around 1912, and has a lift of 6 feet (1.83 m) to the west.

== Geography ==
According to the United States Census Bureau, the town has a total area of 60.0 square miles (155 km^{2}), of which 59.4 square miles (154 km^{2}) is land and 0.6 square miles (1.6 km^{2}) (1.00%) is water.

The Erie Canal passes through the town, incorporating part of the Clyde River. During renovations of the canal, the route was altered, leaving behind remnants of the original Erie Canal.

The southern border of the town also constitutes part of the border between Wayne County and Seneca County (Town of Junius).

New York State Route 31 is an east–west highway near the Erie Canal, and it intersects New York State Route 414 in the village of Clyde.

== Demographics ==
Historical population
Census	Pop.	Note	%±
1820	2,979		—
1830	3,631		21.9%
1840	4,234		16.6%
1850	4,609		8.9%
1860	5,340		15.9%
1870	5,706		6.9%
1880	5,461		−4.3%
1890	4,922		−9.9%
1900	4,606		−6.4%
1910	4,630		0.5%
1920	4,172		−9.9%
1930	3,901		−6.5%
1940	3,858		−1.1%
1950	4,036		4.6%
1960	4,419		9.5%
1970	4,619		4.5%
1980	4,480		−3.0%
1990	4,413		−1.5%
2000	4,439		0.6%
2010	4,290		−3.4%
2016 (est.)	4,126		−3.8%
U.S. Decennial Census

As of the census of 2010, there were 4,290 people, 1,610 households, and 1,117 families residing in the town. The population density was 72.2 inhabitants per square mile (27.9/km^{2}). The racial makeup of the town was 92.8% White, 3.2% Black or African American, 0.2% Native American, 0.3% Asian, 0.0% Pacific Islander, 0.5% from other races, and 3.1% from two or more races. Hispanic or Latino of any race were 3.2% of the population.

There were 1,610 households, out of which 29.9% had children under the age of 18 living with them, 51.7% were married couples living together, 11.2% had a female householder with no husband present, and 30.6% were non-families. 24.3% of all households were made up of individuals, and 11.4% had someone living alone who was 65 years of age or older. The average household size was 2.66 and the average family size was 3.13.

In the town, the population was spread out, with 29.3% under the age of 20, 5.5% from 20 to 24, 22.5% from 25 to 44, 29.0% from 45 to 64, and 13.7% who were 65 years of age or older. The median age was 39.0 years. For every 100 females, there were 99.8 males. For every 100 females age 18 and over, there were 97.2 males.

The median income for a household in the town was $49,028, and the median income for a family was $54,528. Males had a median income of $38,682 versus $33,984 for females. The per capita income for the town was $21,692. About 6.4% of families and 9.1% of the population were below the poverty line, including 13.5% of those under age 18 and 7.0% of those age 65 or over.

=== Housing ===
There were 1,811 housing units at an average density of 30.5 per square mile (11.8/km^{2}); a total of 11.1% of housing units were vacant.

There were 1,610 occupied housing units in the town, of which 1,255 were owner-occupied units (78.0%), while 355 were renter-occupied (22.0%). The homeowner vacancy rate was 1.6% of total units. The rental unit vacancy rate was 10.8%.

== Communities and locations in the Town of Galen ==
- Angells Corners — A hamlet in the south part of the town on NY-414.
- Clyde — The Village of Clyde at the Erie Canal and NY-31.
- Fergusons Corners — A location in the northwest part of the town on County Road 247.
- Hunts Corners — A location in the northeast corner of the town on County Road 269.
- Lock Berlin — A hamlet in the west part of the town on County Road 245 by the route of the Old Erie Canal.
- Lockpit — A location in the southeast part of the town by the old route of the Erie Canal. It was originally known as "Meadville."
- Marengo — A hamlet in the southwest part of the town, west of Angells Corners.
- Noble Corner — A hamlet on the east town line.
- Pangborn Corners — A location east of Hung Corner at the east town line.
- Shephards Corner — A hamlet northeast of Clyde on County Road 269.
- White Schoolhouse Corners — A location near Shephards Corner at the intersection of NY-414 and County Road 249.
