= Flight of Five Locks =

Series of locks on the Erie Canal, NY

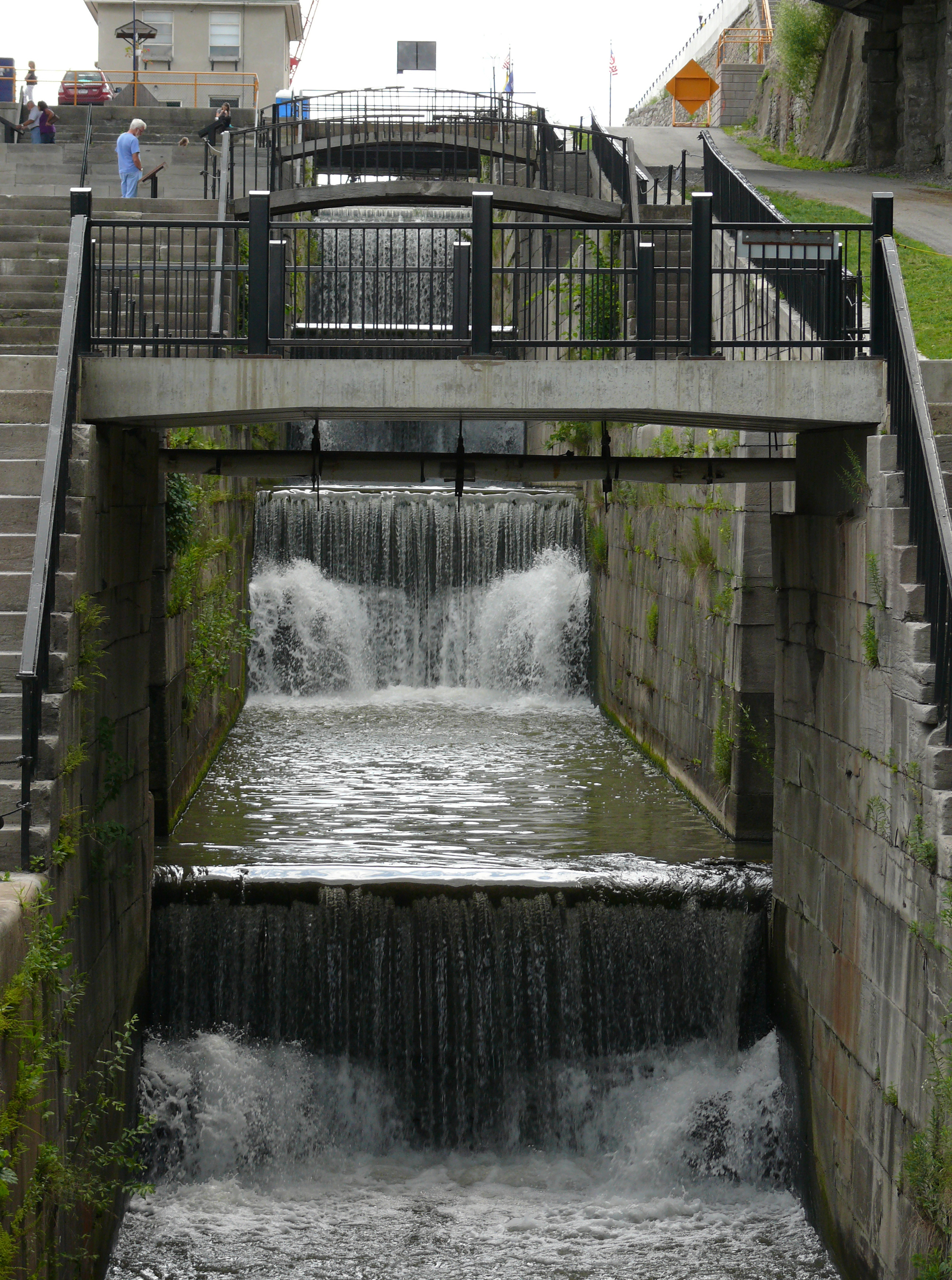
Original northern five step lock structure crossing the Niagara Escarpment at Lockport, before restoration

The Flight of Five Locks on the Erie Canal in Lockport, New York is a staircase lock constructed to lift or lower a canal boat over the Niagara Escarpment in five stages.

The locks are part of the Erie Canalway National Heritage Corridor.

In Stairway to Empire: Lockport, the Erie Canal, and the Shaping of America, (SUNY Press, 2009), historian Patrick McGreevy details the construction of the locks. The "Stairway" of McGreeevy's title is the Flight of Five Locks.

== History ==
To carry the canal across the Niagara Escarpment, the engineers built a five-step staircase lock.

== Restoration ==
The restored locks reopened in 2014 (11 years ago).
