= Fairville, New York =

Hamlet in New York, United States

Coordinates: 43°07′01″N 77°04′45″W

Fairville is a hamlet in the Town of Arcadia, Wayne County, New York, United States. It is located five miles (8 km) north-northeast of the Village of Newark, at an elevation of 440 feet (134 m). The primary cross roads where the hamlet is located are N.Y. Route 88, Fairville-Maple Ridge Road (CR 232) and Fairville Station Road (CR 233).

The Apple Shed, a longtime farm market and cider mill, is located a mile northwest of Fairville.
