= Morgan–Manning House =

Historic house in New York, United States

- Morgan-Manning House
- U.S. National Register of Historic Places
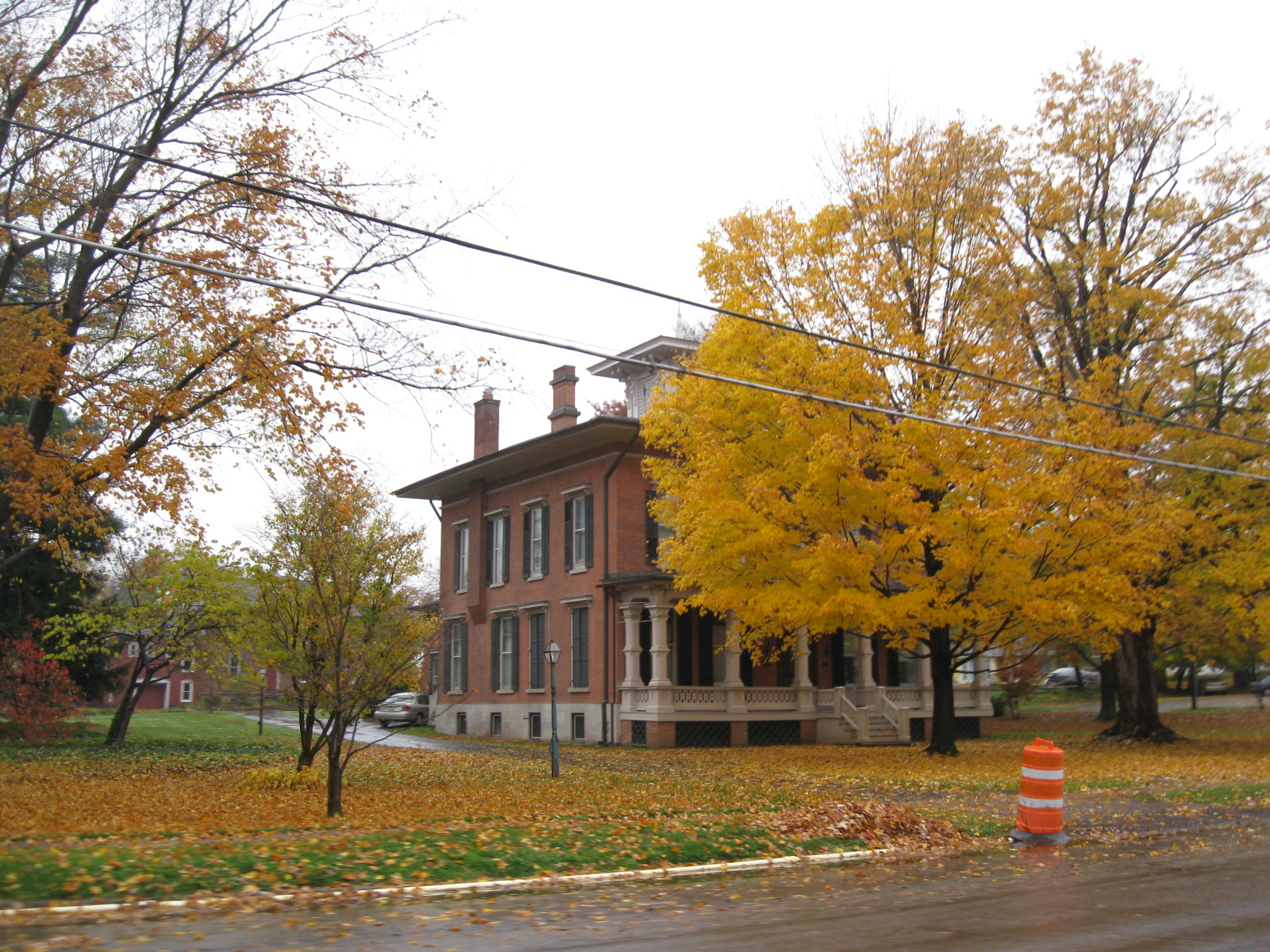
- Morgan-Manning House, October 2009

- Location within New York Location within the United States
- Location: 151 Main St., Brockport, New York
- Coordinates: 43°12′45″N 77°56′22″W
- Area: 1.1 acres (0.45 ha)
- Built: 1854
- Architectural style: Italianate
- NRHP reference No.: 91000443
- Added to NRHP: April 25, 1991

The Morgan–Manning House is a historic house located in Brockport, Monroe County, New York. It was built in 1854 and is a two-story, Italianate–style brick dwelling on a limestone foundation. The five-by-four-bay main block features a hipped roof and cupola. It has a two-story hipped roof wing with a smaller two-story brick appendage creating a stepped, or telescoping, plan or profile. The house also has a full-width porch with brick piers. The interior features elaborate interior woodwork, period plasterwork, stained glass and decorated ceilings. Also on the property is a contributing carriage house.

The home was originally built for John C. Ostrom and was purchased in 1867 by Dayton S. Morgan and his wife Susan Jocelyn Morgan. Dayton Morgan was a local industrialist whose foundry, the Globe Iron Works, produced the first hundred mechanized reapers for Cyrus McCormick. Mr Morgan went on to produce his own very successful mechanized reapers with business partner William Seymour. The house remained in the Morgan family for almost the next hundred years. The Morgan family remodeled many of the rooms on the main floor of the house in the late Victorian style, embellishing the rooms oak and cherry paneling and trim, and stained glass windows. Dayton Morgan died in 1890. His daughter Sara Morgan married physician Frederick Manning in the 1890s. After the early death of her husband, Mrs. Manning returned to Brockport with her young son Arnold, who died at age 21 in 1916. Sara Morgan Manning stayed on in her parents' house until her death in 1964, at age 96, following a disastrous fire that swept through the house on September 26th of that year.

Mrs. Manning bequeathed her home to her community. A group of local citizens formed the Western Monroe Historical Society to restore and care for the house, which had become a local landmark. The damage from the fire has been repaired and the house is furnished to reflect the lifestyle of a wealthy canal town resident during the second half of the 19th century, through the first quarter of the 20th century. The Society's collection includes many portraits of locally prominent 19th-century residents and furnishings from local families.

It was listed on the National Register of Historic Places in 1991. It is designated as a Point of Interest on the Erie Canalway National Heritage Corridor by the National Park Service.

On the evening of Tuesday, January 14, 2025 at approximately 6:45 PM, members of the buildings board arrived for their monthly meeting, upon entering the residence, smoke was discovered coming from the basement. The small basement fire spread quickly due to the Victorian structural components. Fire crews responded from the Brockport Volunteer Fire Department, as well as 4 alarms of mutual aide from neighboring departments. The structure was left with significant damage, including a partial collapse of the second floor, and the pool room and a small bedroom collapsed on the first floor. Several rooms were left with water and smoke damage. The building was secured, and is set to have the roof shrink wrapped to prevent weather damage while awaiting assessment for possible repairs. Board members say they are looking into rebuilding.
