= Mud Mills, New York =

Hamlet in New York, United States

Coordinates: 43°04′30″N 77°04′32″W

Mud Mills is a hamlet in the Town of Arcadia, Wayne County, New York, United States. It is located three miles (5 km) north-northeast of the Village of Newark, at an elevation of 427 feet (130 m). The primary intersection in the hamlet is at Welcher Road (CR 234) and Mud Mills Road. N.Y. Route 88 passes just north of Mud Mills.

A historic 2 1/2-story grist mill (built c. 1804) is located along Ganargua Creek on Mud Mills Road. The facility remained in operation until 1969. It has been reputed that this grist mill is the last in Wayne County with the mechanics still intact.
