= North Rose-Wolcott Central School District =

School district in New York, United States

North-Rose Wolcott Central School District

Location
- Wolcott, New York United States

District information
- Motto: Academics. Commitment. Excellence.
- Grades: UPK-12
- Superintendent: Michael Pullen
- Schools: 3

Students and staff
- Athletic conference: Section V
- District mascot: Cougars
- Colors: Green and White

Other information
- Website: http://www.nrwcs.org

North Rose-Wolcott Central School District is a school district in North Rose and Wolcott, New York, United States. The superintendent is Michael Pullen.

The district operates three schools: North Rose-Wolcott High School, Leavenworth Middle School, and North Rose Elementary School.

== Administration ==
The district offices are located at 11631 Salter-Colvin Road in Wolcott. The superintendent is Michael Pullen.

=== Administrators ===
- Michael Pullen, superintendent

=== Selected former superintendents ===
Previous assignment and reason for departure denoted in parentheses

- Charles H. Kortz–?-2002)
- Lucinda Miner–2002-2003 [interim](interim)
- Daniel R. Starr–2003-2005 (Principal - Williamson High School, named Superintendent of Corinth Central School)
- Lucinda Miner–2006-2010)
- Harold E. Ferguson–2010 [interim]
- John E. Walker–2010-2014 (Principal - Webster Thomas High School, retired)

== North Rose-Wolcott High School ==
North Rose-Wolcott High School

Location
- 11631 Salter-Colvin Road; Wolcott, Wayne, New York 14590

Information
- Principal: Nicole Sinclair
- Vice Principal: Lisa Visalli
- Grades: 9-12
- Website: North-Rose Wolcott High School

North-Rose Wolcott High School is located at 11631 Salter-Colvin Road in Wolcott and serves grades 9 through 12. The principal position is Nicole Sinclair.

=== History ===
==== Selected former principals ====
Previous assignment and reason for departure denoted in parentheses

- Theodore Woods
- Robert P. Ceccarelli–?-2004 (unknown, retired)
- William W. Rotenberg–2004-2007
- June Muto–2007-2009
- Varina Wilson–2009-2010
- Paul G. Benz–2011-2016
- Brian Read;2016-2020

== Leavenworth Middle School ==
Leavenworth Middle School

Location
- 5957 New Hartford Street; Wolcott, Wayne, New York 14590

Information
- Principal: Crystal Rupp
- Assistant Principal: Scott Hassall
- Grades: 5-8
- Website: Leavenworth Middle School

Leavenworth Middle School is located at 5957 New Hartford Street in Wolcott and serves grades 5 through 8. The current principal is Crystal Rupp.

=== History ===
==== Selected former principals ====
- John F. Boogaard Jr.–?-2007
- Michele Sullivan–2007-2013

== North Rose Elementary School ==
North Rose Elementary School

Location
- 10456 Salter Road; North Rose, Wayne, New York 14516

Information
- Principal: Karen Haak
- Asst. Principal: Benjamin Stopka
- Grades: K-4
- Website: North Rose Elementary School

North Rose Elementary School is located at 10456 Salter Road in North Rose and serves grades K through 4. The current principal is Karen Haak.

=== History ===
For many years, North Rose Elementary served Grades 3 through 5. In 2011, the school re-consolidated to house Grades K to 4 after Florentine Hendrick Elementary was closed.

==== Selected former principals ====
- Mary Augusta Boogaard–?-2003
- Neil Thompson–2003-2010

== Defunct school ==
=== Florentine Hendrick Elementary School ===
Florentine Hendrick Elementary School

Information
- Grades: K-2

Florentine Hendrick Elementary School was located at 5751 New Hartford Street in Wolcott and served grades K through 2. The school closed in 2011.

==== History ====
===== Selected former principals =====
- Linda Haensch–?-2011

== Selected former administrators ==
Year	Superintendent	Florentine Hendrick Principal	High School Principal
1999-2000	Charlie Kortz	Linda Haensch	Bob Ceccarelli
2000-2001	Charlie Kortz	Linda Haensch	Bob Ceccarelli
2001-2002	Charlie Kortz	Linda Haensch	Bob Ceccarelli
2002-2003	Lucinda Miner*	Linda Haensch	Bob Ceccarelli
2003-2004	Dan Starr	Linda Haensch	Bob Ceccarelli
2004-2005	Dan Starr	Linda Haensch	Bill Rotenberg
2005-2006	Lucinda Miner	Linda Haensch	Bill Rotenberg
2006-2007	Lucinda Miner	Linda Haensch	Bill Rotenberg
2007-2008	Lucinda Miner	Linda Haensch	June Muto
2008-2009	Lucinda Miner	Linda Haensch	June Muto
2009-2010	Miner/Ferguson*	Linda Haensch	Tina Wilson
2010-2011	John Walker	Linda Haensch	Ceccarelli*/Benz
2011-2012	John Walker		Paul Benz
2012-2013	John Walker		Paul Benz
2013-2014	John Walker		Paul Benz
2014-2015	Hann*/Vigliotti		Paul Benz
2015-2016	Steve Vigliotti		Paul Benz
2016-2017	Steve Vigliotti		Brian Read

*Denotes interim appointment
