= Arcadia, New York =

- Town
- Location in Wayne County and the state of New York.

- Location within New York
- Coordinates: 43°3′42″N 77°5′16″W
- Country: United States
- State: New York
- County: Wayne
- Settled: 1791
- Established: February 15, 1825

Government
  - Type: Town Board
  - Supervisor: Dawn Pisciotti
  - Council Members: Richard VanLaeken; David Greco; Michael Diamond; Joseph Gerbig
  - Clerk: Terresa Vastbinder
  - Court: Justice Marsha Williams; Justice Keith Benjamin

Area
  - Total: 52.14 sq mi (135.05 km^{2})
  - Land: 52.03 sq mi (134.76 km^{2})
  - Water: 0.11 sq mi (0.29 km^{2})
- Elevation: 443 ft (135 m)

Population (2010)
  - Total: 14,244
  - Estimate (2016): 13,686
  - Density: 263.0/sq mi (101.56/km^{2})
- Time zone: UTC-5 (Eastern (EST))
  - Summer (DST): UTC-4 (EDT)
- Area codes: 315 and 680
- FIPS code: 36-02440
- GNIS feature ID: 0978686
- Website: https://townofarcadiany.gov/

Arcadia is a town in Wayne County, New York, United States. The population was 14,244 at the 2010 census.

The Town of Arcadia is on the south border of the county and is east of Rochester, New York.

The primary postal district covering the Town of Arcadia is ZIP Code 14513 for Newark.

== History ==
Prior to its split and founding in 1825, the land which Arcadia sits was purchased in the Phelps and Gorham Purchase, which included much of the land of present day New York west of Seneca Lake. By 1789, white settlers were making their way through the future area of Wayne County, and by 1811, the town of Lyons had been founded to the east of present day Arcadia. By 1825, Lyons had grown big enough that the 48th session of the New York State Legislature split Arcadia from Lyons.

Hydesville, New York was a hamlet in the Town of Arcadia. It was the hometown of the spiritualist Fox Sisters.

In 1957, the Bergen Swamp Preservation Society acquired Zurich Bog for conservation.

The town is part of the Erie Canalway National Heritage Corridor.

== Geography ==
According to the United States Census Bureau, the town has a total area of 52.1 square miles (135 km^{2}), of which 52.0 square miles (135 km^{2}) is land and 0.1 square miles (0.26 km^{2}) (0.19%) is water.

The Erie Canal passes across the town and through the Village of Newark. The east end of "the Wide Waters," a wide part of the canal, is in the town.

The terrain contains many drumlins from past glaciation as well as the Zurich Bog.

The southern town line is the border of Ontario County.

New York State Route 31 (east-west) intersects New York State Route 88 in Newark, just south of the Erie Canal.

== Demographics ==
Historical population
Census	Pop.	Note	%±
1830	3,774		—
1840	4,980		32.0%
1850	5,145		3.3%
1860	5,319		3.4%
1870	5,271		−0.9%
1880	5,702		8.2%
1890	6,310		10.7%
1900	7,046		11.7%
1910	8,672		23.1%
1920	9,266		6.8%
1930	10,051		8.5%
1940	12,108		20.5%
1950	12,816		5.8%
1960	15,836		23.6%
1970	15,245		−3.7%
1980	14,697		−3.6%
1990	14,855		1.1%
2000	14,889		0.2%
2010	14,244		−4.3%
2016 (est.)	13,686		−3.9%
U.S. Decennial Census

As of the census of 2010, there were 14,244 people, 5,792 households, and 3,632 families residing in the town. The population density was 273.4 inhabitants per square mile (105.6/km^{2}). The racial makeup of the town was 89.3% White, 4.6% Black or African American, 0.3% Native American, 0.5% Asian, 0.1% Pacific Islander, 2.2% from other races, and 2.9% from two or more races. Hispanic or Latino of any race were 6.8% of the population.

There were 5,792 households, out of which 26.6% had children under the age of 18 living with them, 43.2% were married couples living together, 14.4% had a female householder with no husband present, and 37.3% were non-families. 30.6% of all households were made up of individuals, and 11.9% had someone living alone who was 65 years of age or older. The average household size was 2.38 and the average family size was 2.93.

In the town, the population was spread out, with 24.8% under the age of 20, 5.9% from 20 to 24, 22.7% from 25 to 44, 30.3% from 45 to 64, and 16.4% who were 65 years of age or older. The median age was 42.4 years. For every 100 females, there were 93.6 males. For every 100 females age 18 and over, there were 91.2 males.

The median income for a household in the town was $44,993, and the median income for a family was $54,415. Males had a median income of $38,636 versus $33,172 for females. The per capita income for the town was $22,331. About 12.2% of families and 15.0% of the population were below the poverty line, including 22.3% of those under age 18 and 10.8% of those age 65 or over.

=== Housing ===
There were 6,194 housing units at an average density of 118.9 per square mile (45.9/km^{2}). 6.5% of housing units were vacant.

There were 5,792 occupied housing units in the town. 3,798 were owner-occupied units (65.6%), while 1,994 were renter-occupied (34.4%). The homeowner vacancy rate was 1.8% of total units. The rental unit vacancy rate was 6.3%.

== Communities and locations in the Town of Arcadia ==
- Arcadia — The former community of Arcadia is now part of the Village of Newark.
- Austin — A hamlet containing the "Maple Ridge" and bordering with the town of Sodus. Along Maple Ridge Road and Austin Road.
- Brantling Hill — A large drumlin in the northeast corner of the town. It is the location of a ski slope.
- Fairville — A hamlet near the town's center along state Route 88.
- Fairville Station — A hamlet northeast of Newark along Fairville Station Road, Heidenreich Road Coleman Hill Road and Arcadia Zurich Norris Road.
- Hydesville — A hamlet north of Newark village on Hydesville Road and Parker Road. The hamlet is called the birthplace of Modern Spiritualism, due to the events of natives Kate and Margaret Fox.
- Marbletown — A hamlet on Marbletown Road (County Road 336), Miller Road and Silver Hill Road near the south town line.
- Minsteed — A hamlet in the northwest corner of the town, on Martin Road, Skinner Road, and Minsteed Road.
- Mud Mills — A hamlet northeast of Newark on Welcher Road (County Road 234.), Mud Mills Road, and Sleight Road.
- Newark — The Village of Newark, located on the Erie Canal and the intersection of NY-31 and NY-88.
- Stebbins Corner — A location west of Hydesville on Tellier Road (County Road 225.)
- Whitings Corners — A hamlet just north of Newark, southwest of Mud Mills, and east of Hydesville.
- Zurich — A location in the northeast corner of the town on Zurich Road (County Road 237), Bramer Road, Lembke Road, Deneef Road and Layton Street Road. Has a portion in the town of Lyons.
- Zurich Bog — A swamp west of Zurich is the lowest point in the town and a registered national landmark. It is also known as "Mud Pond," an open body of water within the bog. It was called "Big Swamp" to the early settlers and "Bottomless Pit" to natives. The swamp is about three miles long and a mile wide.

== Notable people ==
- Electa Amanda Wright Johnson (1838-1929), philanthropist, writer

== See also ==
- List of towns in New York
