= Clyde, New York =

- Village
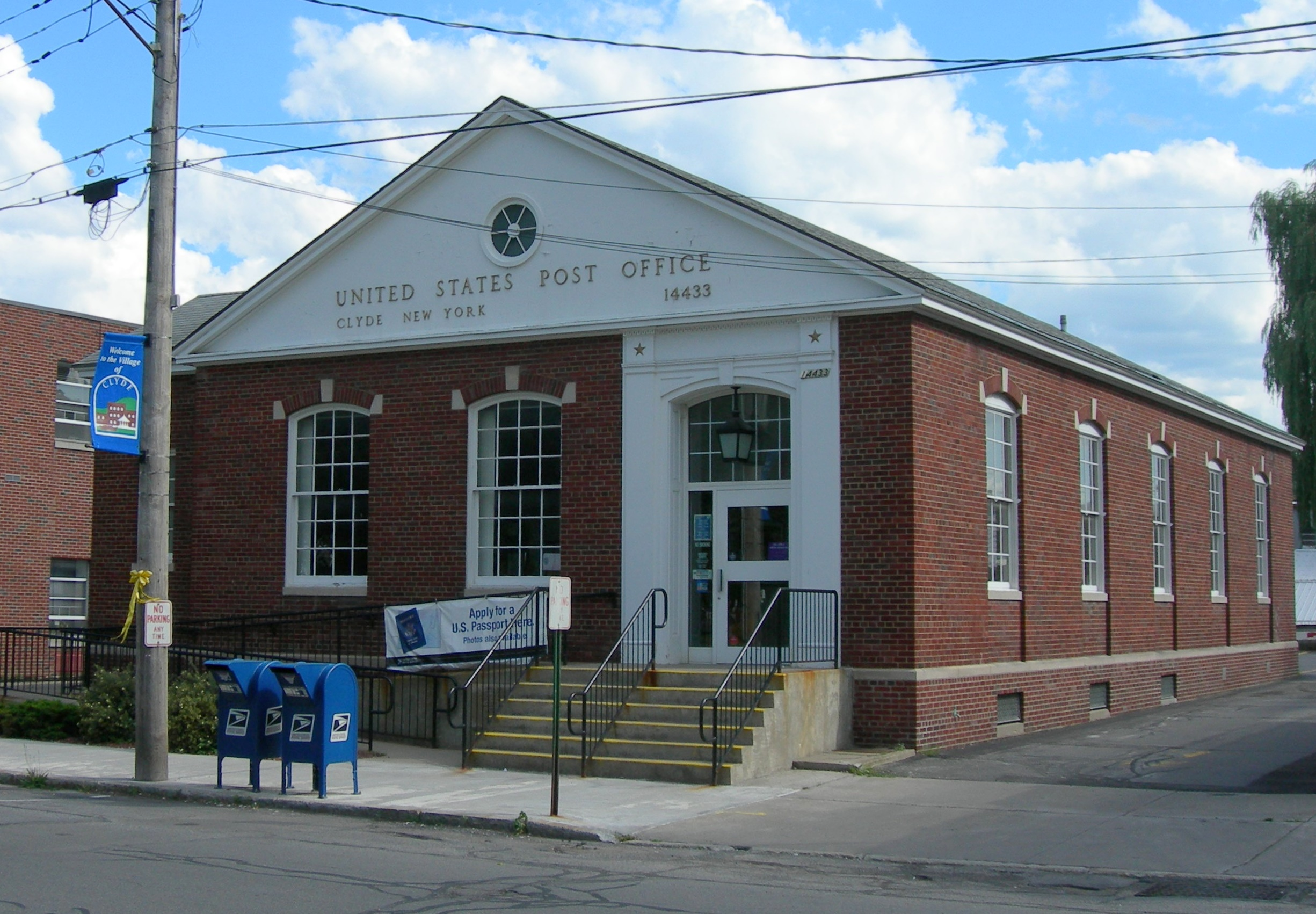
- The Clyde Post Office

- Location in Wayne County and the state of New York.

- Location within the state of New York
- Coordinates: 43°5′3″N 76°52′13″W
- Country: United States
- State: New York
- County: Wayne
- Town: Galen
- Settled: 1811
- Incorporated: May 2, 1835
- Named for: River Clyde

Government
  - Type: Board of Trustees
  - Mayor: Jerry Fremouw
  - Clerk: Ann Fenton

Area
  - Total: 2.26 sq mi (5.85 km^{2})
  - Land: 2.20 sq mi (5.69 km^{2})
  - Water: 0.058 sq mi (0.15 km^{2})
- Elevation: 400 ft (122 m)

Population (2020)
  - Total: 2,171
  - Density: 987.6/sq mi (381.33/km^{2})
- Time zone: UTC-5 (Eastern (EST))
  - Summer (DST): UTC-4 (EDT)
- ZIP code: 14433
- Area code: 315
- FIPS code: 36-16573
- GNIS feature ID: 0946941
- Website: http://www.clydeny.com

Clyde is a village in Wayne County, New York, United States. As of the 2020 census, Clyde had a population of 2,171. It was named after the River Clyde, in Scotland, and the village sits on the Clyde River, a tributary of the Seneca River.

The Village of Clyde is in the Town of Galen and is northeast of Geneva, New York. Clyde is approximately equidistant between the cities of Rochester and Syracuse.

== History ==
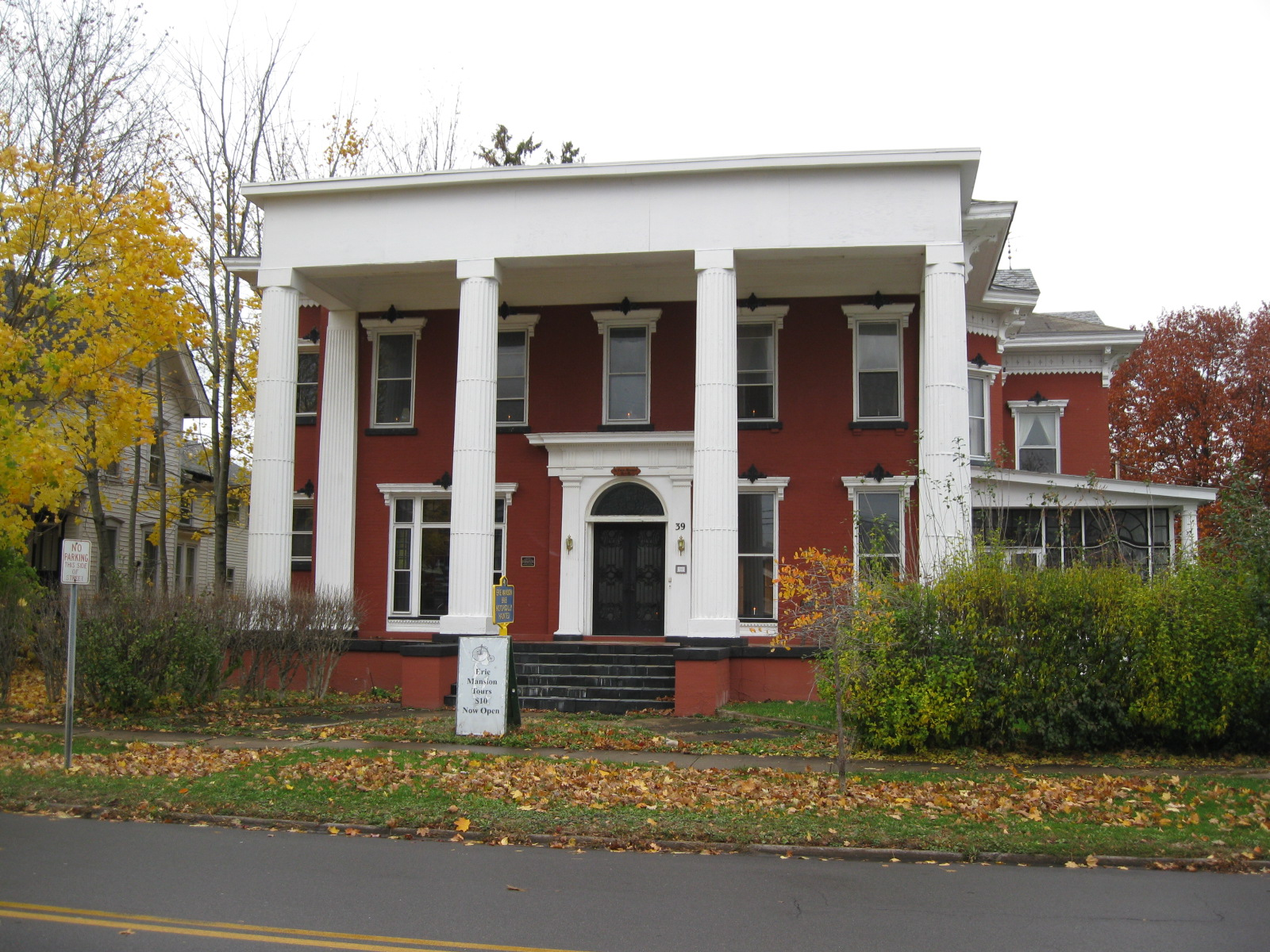
Smith-Ely Mansion

Prior to the French and Indian War, a French trading post and block house was located on the site of the future village. During the American Revolution it was known for its smuggling and was called the "Blockhouse."

The Smith-Ely Mansion and U.S. Post Office are listed on the National Register of Historic Places.

=== Civil War ===
During the American Civil War, men from Clyde served in B Company of the 111th New York Volunteer Infantry, their last company commander of the war being Philip I. Lape. The regiment commander was Colonel Clinton D. MacDougall. The 111th New York was present at, among others, the Battle of Gettysburg, the Battle of the Wilderness, the Battle of Cold Harbor and the Appomattox Campaign. During the Battle of Gettysburg, the 111th took the second highest casualties as a regiment of the entire battle. Throughout the war, the regiment took a total of 1803 casualties, of which 158 were KIA, 557 were WIA (490 of whom recovered to some extent), and 1088 MIA.

Clyde is part of the Erie Canalway National Heritage Corridor.

== Geography ==
Clyde is located at 43°5′3″N 76°52′13″W (43.084232, -76.870297).

According to the United States Census Bureau, the village has a total area of 2.3 square miles (6.0 km^{2}), of which 2.2 square miles (5.7 km^{2}) is land and 0.1 square miles (0.26 km^{2}) (2.21%) is water.

Clyde is an Erie Canal village. The Clyde River was incorporated into the canal structure. The route of the canal through village was changed during canal renovations.

The village is at the intersection of state routes 31 and 414.

== Demographics ==
Historical population
Census	Pop.	Note	%±
1870	2,735		—
1880	2,826		3.3%
1890	2,638		−6.7%
1900	2,507		−5.0%
1910	2,695		7.5%
1920	2,528		−6.2%
1930	2,374		−6.1%
1940	2,356		−0.8%
1950	2,492		5.8%
1960	2,693		8.1%
1970	2,828		5.0%
1980	2,491		−11.9%
1990	2,409		−3.3%
2000	2,269		−5.8%
2010	2,093		−7.8%
2020	2,171		3.7%
U.S. Decennial Census

=== 2020 census ===
As of the 2020 census, Clyde had a population of 2,171. The median age was 37.7 years. 27.2% of residents were under the age of 18 and 16.3% of residents were 65 years of age or older. For every 100 females there were 98.6 males, and for every 100 females age 18 and over there were 97.4 males age 18 and over.

0.0% of residents lived in urban areas, while 100.0% lived in rural areas.

There were 840 households in Clyde, of which 34.4% had children under the age of 18 living in them. Of all households, 42.1% were married-couple households, 19.6% were households with a male householder and no spouse or partner present, and 26.1% were households with a female householder and no spouse or partner present. About 28.4% of all households were made up of individuals and 14.1% had someone living alone who was 65 years of age or older.

There were 947 housing units, of which 11.3% were vacant. The homeowner vacancy rate was 2.9% and the rental vacancy rate was 9.8%.

Racial composition as of the 2020 census
Race	Number	Percent
White	1,837	84.6%
Black or African American	80	3.7%
American Indian and Alaska Native	3	0.1%
Asian	12	0.6%
Native Hawaiian and Other Pacific Islander	0	0.0%
Some other race	39	1.8%
Two or more races	200	9.2%
Hispanic or Latino (of any race)	93	4.3%

=== 2010 census ===
As of the census of 2010, there were 2,093 people, 798 households, and 545 families residing in the village. The population density was 951.4 inhabitants per square mile (367.3/km^{2}). The racial makeup of the village was 90.2% White, 4.5% Black or African American, 0.2% Native American, 0.5% Asian, 0.0% Pacific Islander, 0.6% from other races, and 4.1% from two or more races. Hispanic or Latino of any race were 4.0% of the population.

There were 798 households, out of which 31.2% had children under the age of 18 living with them, 45.4% were married couples living together, 15.4% had a female householder with no husband present, and 31.7% were non-families. 26.8% of all households were made up of individuals, and 13.2% had someone living alone who was 65 years of age or older. The average household size was 2.61 and the average family size was 3.10.

In the village the population was spread out, with 30.1% under the age of 20, 6.3% from 20 to 24, 23.5% from 25 to 44, 26.1% from 45 to 64, and 13.9% who were 65 years of age or older. The median age was 37.1 years. For every 100 females there were 94.7 males. For every 100 females age 18 and over, there were 90.4 males.

=== Income and poverty ===
The median income for a household in the village was $41,471, and the median income for a family was $54,732. Males had a median income of $41,471 versus $34,115 for females. The per capita income for the village was $20,546. About 11.5% of families and 16.9% of the population were below the poverty line, including 23.0% of those under age 18 and 14.2% of those age 65 or over.

=== Housing ===
There were 910 housing units at an average density of 413.6 per square mile (159.7/km^{2}); a total of 12.3% of housing units were vacant.

There were 798 occupied housing units in the village, of which 555 were owner-occupied units (69.5%), while 243 were renter-occupied (30.5%). The homeowner vacancy rate was 2.6% of total units. The rental unit vacancy rate was 11.6%.

== Government ==
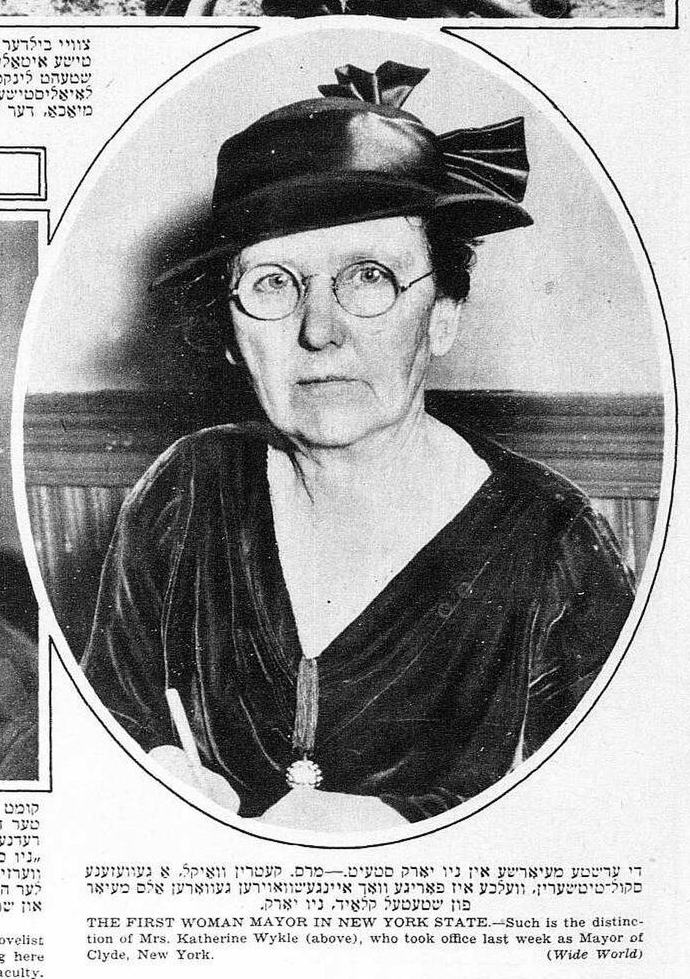
Katherine Wykle, Clyde's mayor from 1937 to 1945 and the first female elected mayor in the state of New York, as she appeared in The Jewish Daily Forward, April 11, 1937

- Mayor: Jerry Fremouw
- Deputy Mayor: Roland Kanaley
- Village Clerk/Treasurer: Ann Fenton
- Trustee: Roland Kanaley
- Trustee: Paul Ferindino
- Trustee: Mike Nicoletta
- Trustee: Brad Shrimp

Fire services are provided by the Galen Clyde Fire District which protects the Town of Galen in its entirety. The Fire District has 3 stations and its directed by the District Chief. The department runs approximately 700 calls for service. Fire district includes 13 miles of the NYS Thruway and Del Lago Resort and Casino, several industrial conplexes and the erie canal. Disanto Propane Operate their corporate HQ and rail siding terminal in the district. The district operates 3 engine Co's. 2 Truck Co's. 1 Rescue Co. 1 Squad Co. 1 Fire Rescue boat and 1 spill.response trailer. The department has an active membership of 45 members trained to NYS standards. The Fire District also provides contractual fire protection to the Town of Tyre in Seneca County as well..

Station 1 HQ (15 Ford Street Clyde NY)

Chiefs Office

Dispatch Office

Houses Engine 49, Squad 16, Water Rescue 9, HZMT 1, Rescue 2, Ladder 10

Station 2 (11098 CR 243 Clyde NY)

Houses Engine 44

Station 3 (1152 Route 414 Seneca County)

Quint 3

Engine 48

== Notable people ==
- Katherine Wykle, first female elected mayor in the state of New York
