= Erie Canalway National Heritage Corridor =

National Heritage Area in New York State, US

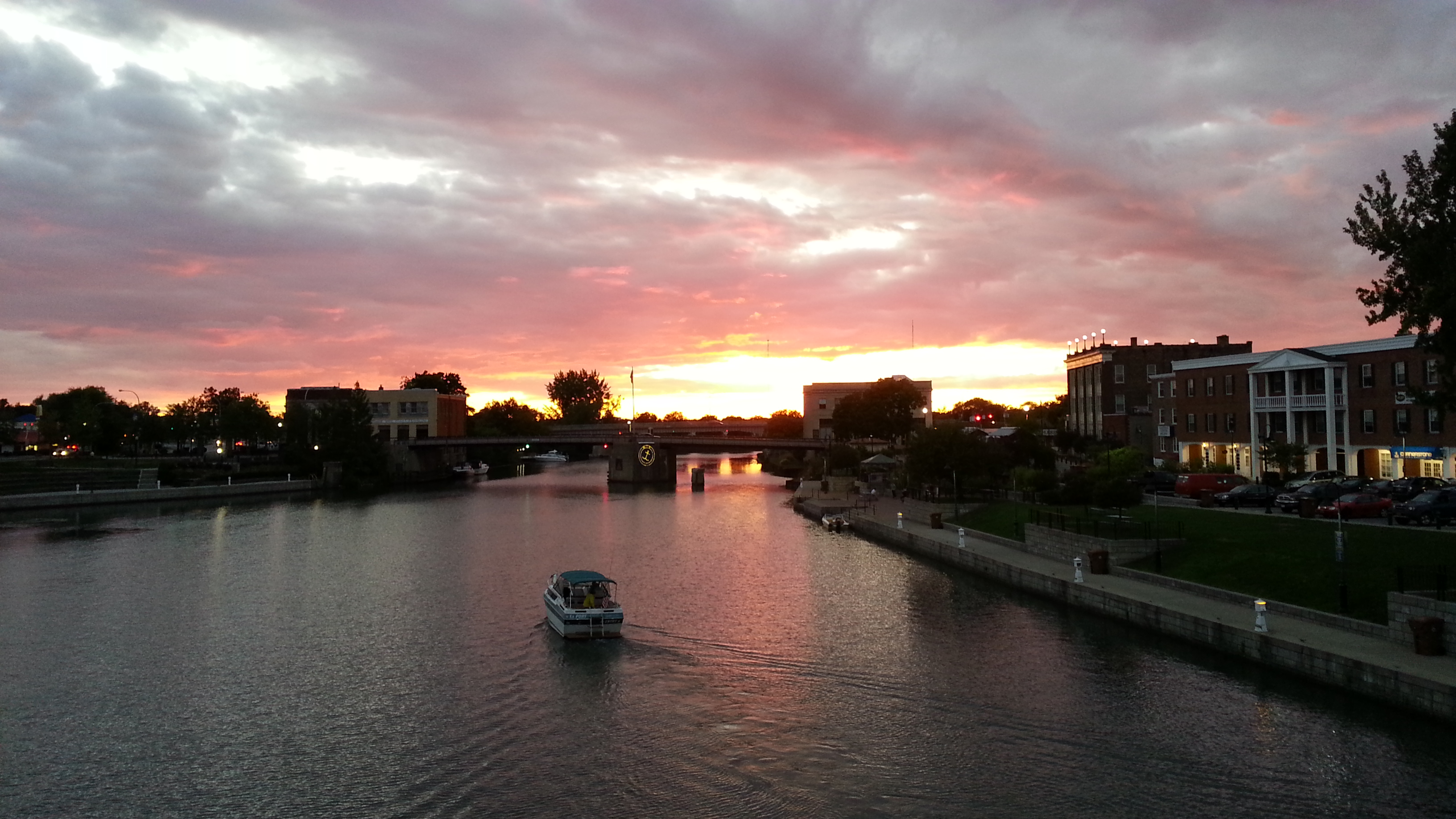
Erie Canal in North Tonawanda, NY

The Erie Canalway National Heritage Corridor is a National Heritage Area in New York State.

It has created signage in a wide area, including placing signs many miles away from any historic site of the Erie Canal.

The corridor includes 34 National historic landmarks and 234 local municipalities.

Among the designated sites is the Morgan-Manning House, which houses the Western Monroe Historical Society and was listed on the National Register of Historic Places in 1991, the Flight of Five Locks in Lockport, and the Mabee Farm Historic Site, which marks an early frontier and gateway to the west.

== See also ==
- New York State Canalway Trail
- Old Erie Canal State Historic Park
