= North Rose, New York =

- Hamlet and CDP
- Location within the state of New York
- Coordinates: 43°11′14″N 76°53′11″W
- Country: United States
- State: New York
- County: Wayne
- Town: Rose

Area
  - Total: 1.69 sq mi (4.38 km^{2})
  - Land: 1.69 sq mi (4.38 km^{2})
  - Water: 0 sq mi (0.00 km^{2})
- Elevation: 381 ft (116 m)

Population (2020)
  - Total: 571
  - Density: 337.8/sq mi (130.43/km^{2})
- Time zone: UTC-5 (Eastern (EST))
  - Summer (DST): UTC-4 (EDT)
- ZIP Code: 14516
- Area codes: 315 and 680
- FIPS code: 36-53462
- GNIS feature ID: 2631641

North Rose is a hamlet (and census-designated place) located in the Town of Rose, Wayne County, New York, United States. As of the 2020 census, North Rose had a population of 571. Government offices for the Town of Rose are located in the hamlet.

== Geography ==
North Rose is located at 43°11′14″N 76°53′11″W.

According to the United States Census Bureau, the CDP has a total area of 1.7 square miles (4.4 km^{2}), all land.

North Rose is located off N.Y. Route 104. The primary cross roads in the hamlet are N.Y. Route 414, also known as Main Street, Glenmark Road and Salter Road (CR 257).

== Demographics ==
Historical population
Census	Pop.	Note	%±
2020	571		—
U.S. Decennial Census

As of the census of 2010, there were 636 people, 259 households, and 167 families residing in the CDP. The population density was 374.1 inhabitants per square mile (144.4/km^{2}). The racial makeup of the CDP was 93.2% White, 0.8% Black or African American, 0.5% Native American, 0.2% Asian, 0.0% Pacific Islander, 1.9% from other races, and 3.5% from two or more races. Hispanic or Latino of any race were 4.2% of the population.

There were 259 households, out of which 27.8% had children under the age of 18 living with them, 46.3% were married couples living together, 10.4% had a female householder with no husband present, and 35.5% were non-families. 27.4% of all households were made up of individuals, and 13.5% had someone living alone who was 65 years of age or older. The average household size was 2.46 and the average family size was 2.91.

In the CDP, the population was spread out, with 24.8% under the age of 20, 7.1% from 20 to 24, 22.1% from 25 to 44, 30.1% from 45 to 64, and 15.7% who were 65 years of age or older. The median age was 42.3 years. For every 100 females, there were 88.7 males. For every 100 females age 18 and over, there were 90.8 males.

The median income for a household in the CDP was $52,708, and the median income for a family was $53,542. Males had a median income of $28,958 versus $25,947 for females. The per capita income for the CDP was $21,528. About 0.0% of families and 2.5% of the population were below the poverty line, including 4.6% of those under age 18 and 0.0% of those age 65 or over.

=== Housing ===
There were 272 housing units at an average density of 160.0 per square mile (61.8/km^{2}). 4.8% of housing units were vacant.

There were 259 occupied housing units in the CDP. 201 were owner-occupied units (77.6%), while 58 were renter-occupied (22.4%). The homeowner vacancy rate was 1.5% of total units. The rental unit vacancy rate was 4.9%.
