= Wayne County, New York =

County in New York, United States

- County
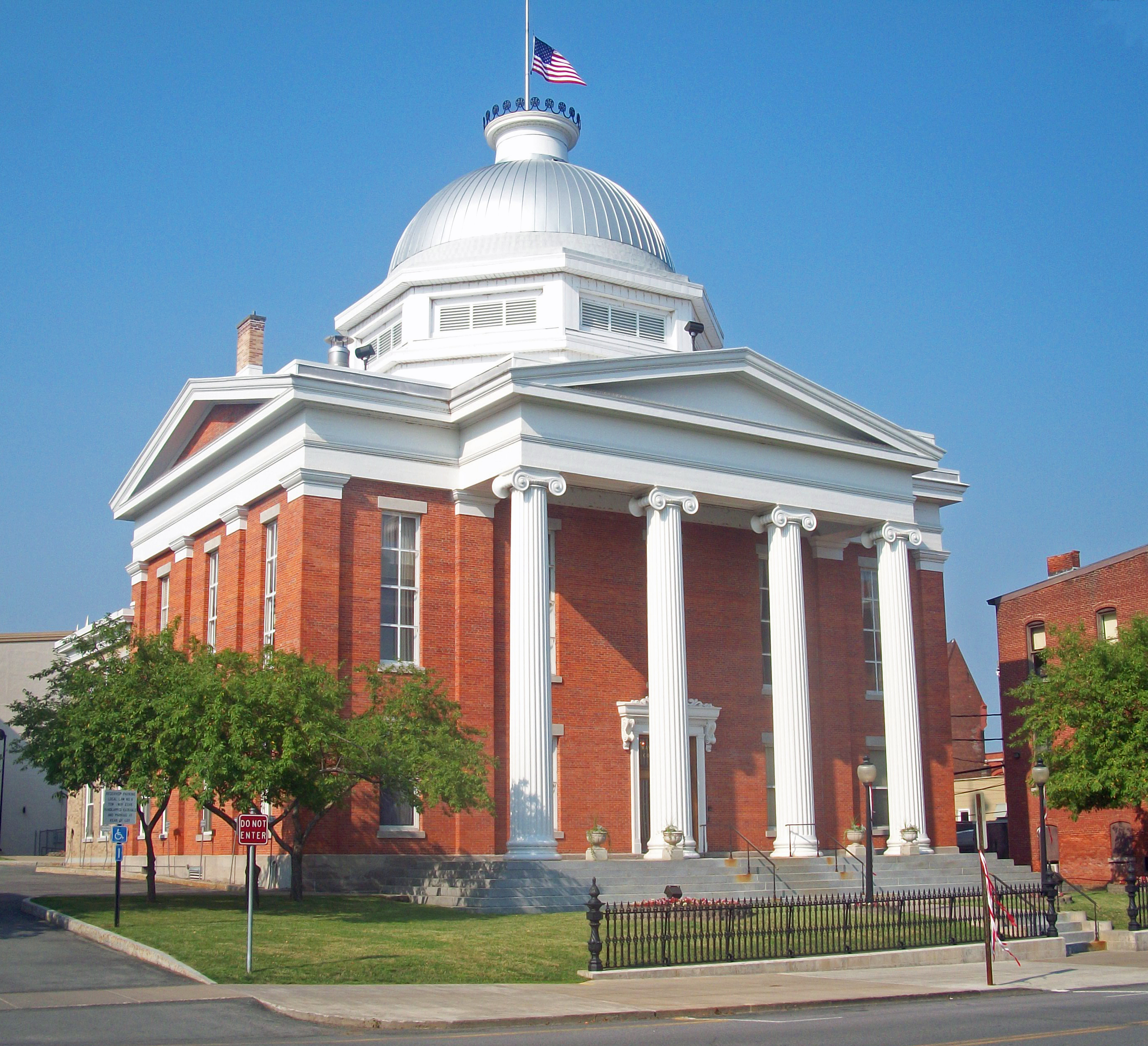
- Wayne County Courthouse in Lyons

- Seal

- Location within the U.S. state of New York
- Coordinates: 43°17′N 77°03′W
- Country: United States
- State: New York
- Founded: 1823
- Named for: Anthony Wayne
- Seat: Lyons
- Largest town: Arcadia

Government
  - County Administrator: Richard House

Area
  - Total: 1,383 sq mi (3,580 km^{2})
  - Land: 604 sq mi (1,560 km^{2})
  - Water: 779 sq mi (2,020 km^{2}) 56%

Population (2020)
  - Total: 91,283
  - Estimate (2025): 91,250 ▼
  - Density: 151/sq mi (58/km^{2})
- Time zone: UTC−5 (Eastern)
  - Summer (DST): UTC−4 (EDT)
- Congressional district: 24th
- Website: www.waynecountyny.gov

Wayne County is a county in the U.S. state of New York. As of the 2020 United States census, the population was 91,283. The county seat is Lyons. The name honors General Anthony Wayne, an American Revolutionary War hero and American statesman. The county is part of the Finger Lakes region of the state.

Wayne County is less than 50 miles west of Syracuse. Wayne County has been considered to be part of the Rochester, New York metropolitan area and lies on the south shore of Lake Ontario, forming part of the northern border of the United States with Canada.

Its location during the early westward expansion of the United States, on an international border and in a fertile farming region, has contributed to a rich cultural and economic history. Two world religions sprung from within its borders, and its inhabitants played important roles in abolitionism in the years leading up to the American Civil War. Nineteenth century War of 1812 skirmishes, Great Lakes sailing ship commerce and Erie Canal barge traffic have yielded to contemporary recognition as one of the world's most productive fruit growing regions. Wayne County ranks as New York's top apple producing county.

== History ==
Prior to the arrival of Europeans, the land Wayne County encompasses was originally part of the Iroquois Confederacy, which had existed from around August 31, 1142. When counties were established in New York State on November 1, 1683, it became part of Albany County.

On April 11, 1823, Wayne County was formed by combining portions of Seneca and Ontario counties.

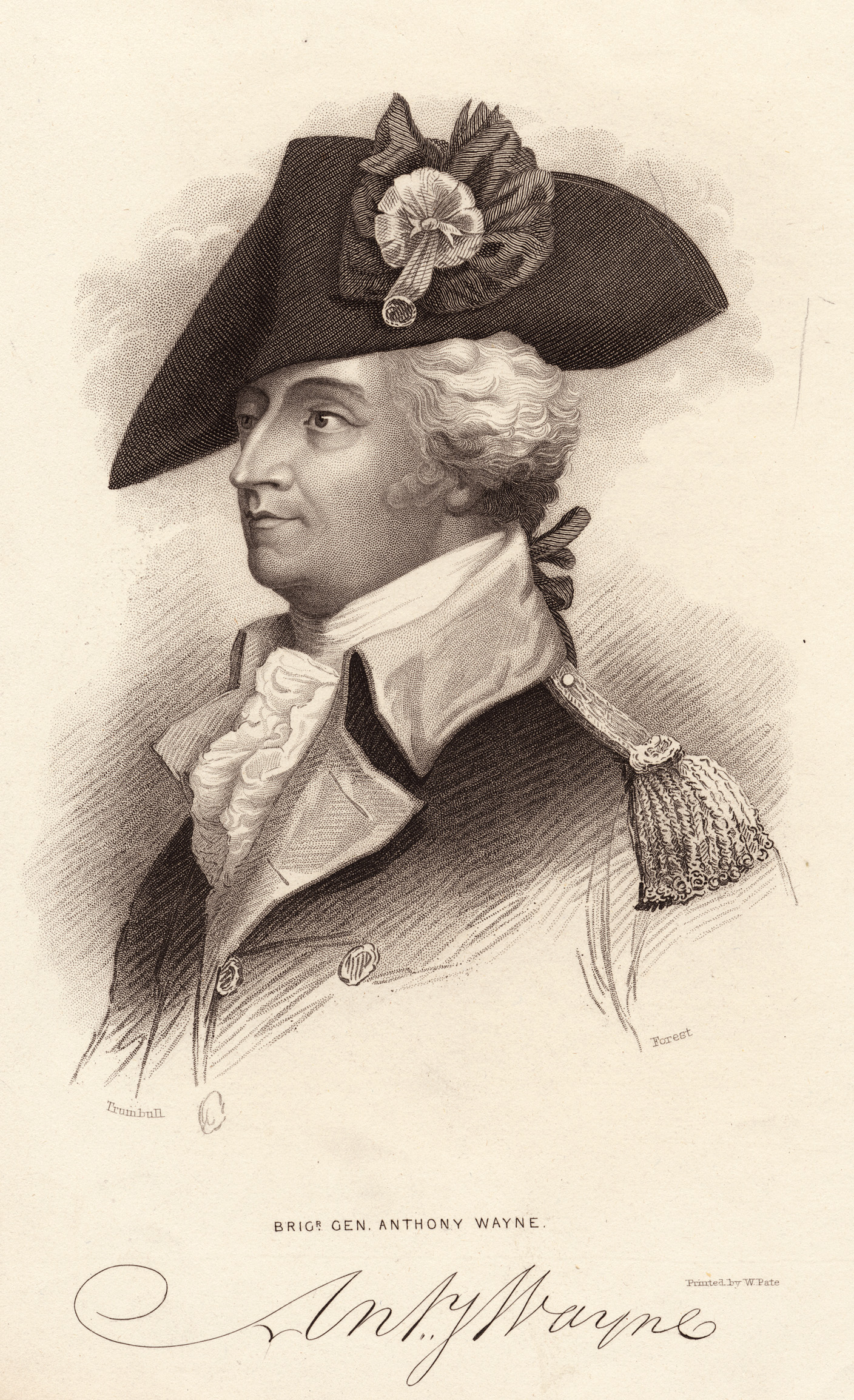
"Mad Anthony" Wayne

=== Westward expansion ===
The first settlers of European extraction came to the region located along the Ganargua River, just west of present-day Palmyra. In 1788 the area became part of the Phelps and Gorham Purchase, a 6,000,000 acres (24,000 km^{2}) tract of land sold to Oliver Phelps and Nathaniel Gorham by the Commonwealth of Massachusetts. Sir William Pulteney, a British baronet and English land speculator, along with his partners in the Pulteney Association, purchased a 1,000,000 acres (4,000 km^{2}) of the former Phelps and Gorham Purchase in 1790.

The first westward road was one coming from near Utica to Geneva, and, with the building of the Cayuga Bridge in 1800, was the road chosen by nearly all of the westward travelers. This highway left the future Wayne County region somewhat isolated and settlers desiring to locate there came by way of streams and lakes lying to the north of the road. It was only a few years after that the "new road" came west, passing through the county, opening up the fertile Ganargua lands to easier settlement.

The first permanent settlement was started by John Swift and Col. John Jenkins in March 1789, about two miles (3.2 km) from Palmyra. In May of that year a small colony made up of the Stansell and Featherly families located at the junction of Ganargwa and the Canandaigua Outlet, calling the place Lyons, from a "fancied likeness of that city's location on the Rhone".

While Phelps and Gorham sold some land to settlers, they were unable to make payments on their land and much of the land in the Phelps Gorham purchase either reverted to Massachusetts and was resold or conveyed directly to Robert Morris, a major financier of the Revolutionary War and signer of the US Declaration of Independence. In 1792, he in turn sold approximately 1,200,000 acres (4,900 km^{2}) to The Pulteney Association owned by Sir William Pulteney and two other minor partners. The Pulteney Purchase, or the Genesee Tract as it was also known, comprised all of the present-day counties of Ontario, Steuben and Yates, as well as portions of Allegany, Livingston, Monroe, Schuyler and Wayne. After Pulteney's death in 1805 the land was known as the Pulteney Estate.

Sir William Pulteney selected Charles Williamson as land agent to develop the purchased 1,200,000 acres (4,900 km^{2}). In 1792, Williamson, a Scotsman, came to the unsettled wilderness in upstate New York to develop the land by building roads, selecting sites for towns, dividing land into lots, and building gristmills, taverns, stores and houses. Williamson selected Sodus Bay on Lake Ontario as the point for a future commercial center, with the idea that the lake and the Saint Lawrence River would be the outlet for the products of the region. In 1794 he had roads built from Palmyra to Phelpstown (present-day Phelps). Sodus was surveyed by Joseph Colt in lots of a quarter acre (1,000 m^{2}), a hotel was built, and $20,000 was expended in the first two years in improvements. Sodus quickly passed from having an uncertain future to the head of the towns of the region.

=== War of 1812 ===
Two small skirmishes were fought in the county during the War of 1812: one in Sodus in June 1813, and the other in Williamson a year later. In May 1814, British troops under the command of Sir James Yeo landed in the Williamson hamlet of Pultneyville. Yeo's fleet had already successfully raided Oswego to the east and unsuccessfully attacked Rochester to the west before attempting to obtain stores from Pultneyville. An agreement with the hamlet's residents was made, permitting the invaders to seize supplies without resistance. A dispute broke out, however, and weapons fire began on both sides, including cannon bombardment from Lake Ontario. A few citizens were killed or wounded and two were taken prisoner as the British fled.

=== Great Lakes commerce ===
Until the opening of the Erie Canal in 1823, Pultneyville, New York, at the mouth of Salmon Creek, was Wayne County's only port. From about 1811 through the 1890s (when the customs office closed), shipping in this small hamlet extended to the Atlantic Ocean and the world via the Saint Lawrence River. During the early years of the 19th century, activity in Pultneyville focused on agricultural commerce from the surrounding region (as far south as Canandaigua) and the maritime trade on the Great Lakes. In 1865, it was home to nearly 30 lake captains, and many sailors from both Pultneyville and Sodus Bay crewed on whalers around the world. In 1874 the first railroad appeared when the Lake Shore Railroad line opened and the center of trade moved three miles (4.8 km) south to Williamson and Pultneyville's significance as a commerce center sharply declined.

=== Religion: Wayne County and the Second Great Awakening ===
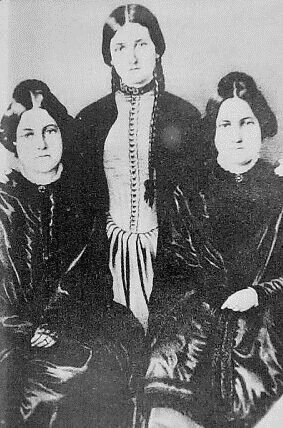
Kate and Margaret Fox

Wayne County played host to key events in the development of significant American religions during the country's Second Great Awakening period of the early 19th century. The Fox Sisters heard rappings from a dead peddler in Hydesville and spawned a movement that eventually garnered a million followers at its peak.

Palmyra became the birthplace of the Latter Day Saint movement in the 1820s.

=== Shakers in Wayne County ===
Sodus Bay also was the site of a community of Shakers from 1826 to 1836. The site provided convenient access to travel by water on the Great Lakes Ontario and Erie, for visits to Shakers who lived in Ohio. This site might also have been useful for abolitionists moving former slaves to freedom in Canada via the Underground Railroad.

The first Shaker leadership team, Elders Jeremiah Talcott and Eldress Polly Lawrence, along with their assistants John Lockwood and Lucy Brown, came to Sodus from the Shakers' parent community at New Lebanon, New York. With 72 converts during their first year, they soon had 200 acres under cultivation. By 1835, the community had grown to almost 150.

However, they learned in 1835 that a canal had been proposed to be dug through their land, and by New York state law, the canal company had the right to seize the property it chose. The Shakers responded by selling their land and 23 buildings to the canal company and moving inland to the 1,700 acres they purchased at Groveland, in Livingston County, New York. However, the canal was never built; two years later, the Shakers were asked to take their property back, but, having reestablished their village elsewhere, and knowing that the land could later be taken for the same purpose, they refused.

Several diaries and journals describing the Shakers' early years at Sodus and Groveland can be found at the Western Reserve Historical Society, Cleveland, Ohio. These manuscripts are available on microfilm at more than 20 locations throughout the U.S.

=== Latter-day Saints (Mormons) ===
Wayne County is the birthplace of the Latter Day Saint movement and Mormonism. Founder Joseph Smith, whose family lived on a farm that straddled the line between Palmyra and Manchester, claimed to have been visited by God the Father and Jesus Christ in 1820, an event known as the First Vision. In 1830 the Book of Mormon was first published in the village of Palmyra by E.B. Grandin, in the present Book of Mormon Historic Publication Site.

=== Spiritualism and the Fox sisters ===
Spiritualists often set March 31, 1848, as the beginning of their movement. On that date, Kate and Margaret Fox, of Hydesville, reported that they had made contact with the spirit of a murdered peddler. What made this an extraordinary event was that the spirit communicated through audible rapping noises, rather than simply appearing to a person in a trance. The evidence of the senses appealed to practical Americans, and the Fox sisters became a sensation. Demonstrations of mediumship (seances and automatic writing, for example) proved to be a profitable business, and soon became popular forms of entertainment and spiritual catharsis. The Foxes earned a living this way, as did many others.

=== Civil War and Underground Railroad ===
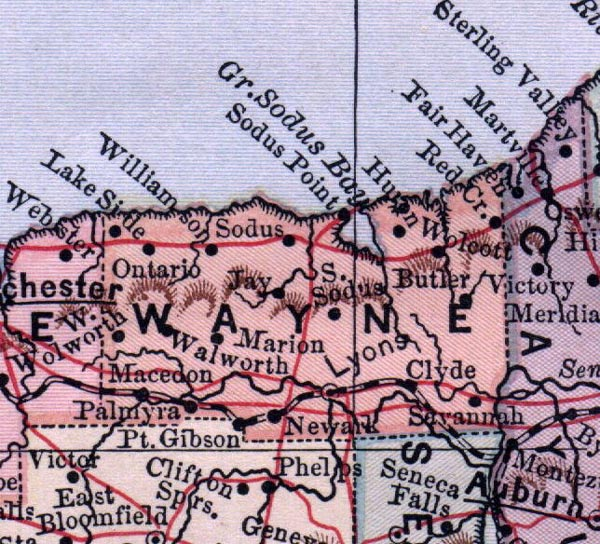
Wayne County detail of 1885 atlas

During the American Civil War Wayne County inhabitants were active in support of the Underground Railroad due to the area's proximity to slavery-free Canada. Wayne County also raised companies for multiple volunteer Union regiments, including the 33rd New York Volunteer Infantry Regiment, the 98th New York Volunteer Infantry Regiment, the 111th New York Volunteer Infantry Regiment, and the 9th New York Heavy Artillery Regiment.

During the Civil War, men from Wayne served in the 111th New York Infantry, under Colonel Clinton D. MacDougall.

The 111th New York was present at, among others, the Battle of Gettysburg, the Battle of the Wilderness, the Battle of Cold Harbor and the Appomattox Campaign. During the Battle of Gettysburg, the 111th took the second highest casualties as a regiment of the entire battle.

Throughout the war, the regiment took a total of 1803 casualties, of which 158 were Killed in action, 557 were Wounded in action (490 of whom recovered to some extent), and 1088 Missing in action.

=== Erie Canal ===
The Erie Canal transits the southern edge of the county. The villages of Clyde, Lyons, Newark, Palmyra and Macedon all became homes to canal locks when the Albany to Rochester section of the canal opened on September 10, 1823. On that day these communities became part of a direct water-link between the eastern seaboard metropolises of New York City and Baltimore and America's expanding western frontier.

=== Hoffman essays ===
Wayne County high school seniors are offered the opportunity to win a scholarship by The Augustus L. and Jennie D. Hoffman Foundation Scholarship Essay Program. Established in 1954 to encourage the study of local history, students research and write essays on some aspect of Wayne County history or civic affairs. Between its inception and 2007 over 600 essays have been submitted.

=== Nuclear power ===
On June 1, 1970, the Robert E. Ginna Nuclear Power Plant started commercial operation on the shores of Lake Ontario, just over the Monroe County line in the Town of Ontario.

The Ginna plant was the site of a minor nuclear accident when, on January 25, 1982, a small amount of radioactive steam leaked into the air after a steam-generator tube ruptured. The leak which lasted 93 minutes led to the declaration of a site emergency. The rupture was caused by a small pie-pan-shaped object left in the steam generator during an outage. This was not the first time a tube rupture had occurred at an American reactor but following on so closely behind the Three Mile Island accident caused considerable attention to be focused on the incident at the Ginna plant. In total, 485.3 curies of noble gas and 1.15 millicuries of iodine-131 were released to the environment.

=== Historical societies ===
In addition to the county historical society, there are a number of other historical preservation organizations. Most of these are town or village based.

- Newark-Arcadia Historical Society
- Butler Historical Preservation Society
- Galen Historical Society
- Historic Palmyra, Inc.
- Lyons Heritage Society
- Macedon Historical Society
- Marion Historical Society
- Ontario Historical & L.P. Society
- Pultneyville Historical (please refer to Williamson-Pultneyville Historical Society)
- Red Creek Historical Society
- Rose Historical Society
- Town of Sodus Historical Society
- Sodus Bay Historical Society
- Walworth Historical Society
- Wayne County Historical Society
- Williamson-Pultneyville Historical Society (www.w-phs.org)
- Wolcott Historical Society

== Law, government and politics ==
The county is governed by a Board of Supervisors, composed of the town supervisors from each of the county's fifteen towns. The board's chairman is selected from amongst the supervisors. The 2007 county budget was $154 million (~$230 million in 2025).

The county seat is the town of Lyons and bi-weekly board meetings are held in the Wayne County Court House in the hamlet. In August 2010, the board made history by convening outside of Lyons for the first time—at the Wayne County fairgrounds in Palmyra.

The Wayne Supreme & County Court (7th Judicial District) sits in Lyons and hears felony cases as well as a few civil cases; the Wayne County Drug Treatment Court also provides an opportunity for recovering drug addicts to work with each other and improve their lifestyles. Vehicle and traffic matters, small claims, evictions, civil matters and criminal offenses in Wayne County are heard in locally-funded town and village courts (collectively known as the Justice Courts).

=== Politics ===
United States presidential election results for Wayne County, New York
Year	Republican / Whig		Democratic		Third party(ies)	
Year	No.	%	No.	%	No.	%
1828	2,372	55.43%	1,907	44.57%	0	0.00%
1832	2,695	48.94%	2,812	51.06%	0	0.00%
1836	2,653	47.20%	2,968	52.80%	0	0.00%
1840	4,309	51.78%	3,996	48.02%	16	0.19%
1844	3,953	46.17%	4,046	47.26%	563	6.58%
1848	3,567	44.00%	797	9.83%	3,743	46.17%
1852	4,033	44.64%	4,050	44.83%	951	10.53%
1856	5,776	62.63%	1,999	21.67%	1,448	15.70%
1860	6,668	62.87%	3,938	37.13%	0	0.00%
1864	6,122	58.23%	4,392	41.77%	0	0.00%
1868	6,322	58.94%	4,405	41.06%	0	0.00%
1872	6,164	62.05%	3,768	37.93%	2	0.02%
1876	7,081	57.29%	5,199	42.06%	80	0.65%
1880	7,600	58.18%	5,207	39.86%	255	1.95%
1884	6,843	54.84%	4,730	37.91%	904	7.25%
1888	7,850	57.73%	5,120	37.65%	628	4.62%
1892	6,848	56.01%	4,618	37.77%	761	6.22%
1896	8,039	63.81%	4,254	33.77%	305	2.42%
1900	7,955	62.29%	4,473	35.02%	343	2.69%
1904	8,081	63.87%	4,140	32.72%	432	3.41%
1908	8,008	62.68%	4,404	34.47%	365	2.86%
1912	4,770	40.32%	3,934	33.26%	3,125	26.42%
1916	7,465	58.72%	4,797	37.73%	451	3.55%
1920	13,333	73.24%	4,289	23.56%	583	3.20%
1924	14,358	73.69%	3,991	20.48%	1,136	5.83%
1928	18,187	75.29%	5,338	22.10%	630	2.61%
1932	15,031	66.29%	7,122	31.41%	522	2.30%
1936	17,901	70.11%	7,099	27.80%	534	2.09%
1940	19,196	72.12%	7,358	27.65%	62	0.23%
1944	17,523	71.36%	6,999	28.50%	33	0.13%
1948	16,167	69.48%	6,749	29.00%	354	1.52%
1952	21,693	76.53%	6,621	23.36%	33	0.12%
1956	22,940	79.51%	5,910	20.49%	0	0.00%
1960	21,290	69.18%	9,476	30.79%	11	0.04%
1964	10,586	36.08%	18,729	63.83%	27	0.09%
1968	17,470	63.09%	8,907	32.17%	1,312	4.74%
1972	23,379	73.89%	8,203	25.92%	60	0.19%
1976	19,324	61.24%	12,061	38.22%	172	0.55%
1980	16,498	50.74%	12,590	38.72%	3,424	10.53%
1984	24,171	70.98%	9,700	28.49%	180	0.53%
1988	20,613	60.80%	12,959	38.22%	330	0.97%
1992	18,019	45.84%	11,866	30.19%	9,421	23.97%
1996	15,837	44.00%	15,145	42.07%	5,015	13.93%
2000	21,701	56.62%	14,977	39.07%	1,651	4.31%
2004	24,709	59.94%	15,709	38.11%	802	1.95%
2008	22,239	54.18%	18,184	44.30%	622	1.52%
2012	20,060	53.43%	16,635	44.30%	852	2.27%
2016	23,380	58.91%	13,473	33.95%	2,834	7.14%
2020	26,204	58.59%	17,456	39.03%	1,067	2.39%
2024	27,286	61.09%	17,056	38.18%	326	0.73%

As of November 2013, Wayne County had a total of 56,589 voters registered (53,891 active, 2,698 inactive). Of those totals: 14,339 were registered as Democrats (13,574 active, 765 inactive); 23,144 as Republicans (22,338 active, 806 inactive); 3,035 as Independence (2,831 active, 204 inactive); 1,517 as Conservative (1,454 active, 63 inactive); and the rest as Greens, Libertarians, and other minor parties. In the 2010 gubernatorial election, Wayne County cast 12,126 Democratic votes for Andrew M. Cuomo, 9,552 Republican votes for Carl Paladino, 1,153 Independence votes for Cuomo, 2,489 Conservative votes for Paladino, 490 Working Families Party votes for Cuomo, and 401 Taxpayers Party votes for Paladino.

Wayne County has only voted for the Democratic presidential candidate once since the Republican Party was founded in 1854.

In the 2014 gubernatorial election, Wayne County cast 5,874 Democratic votes for Andrew M. Cuomo, 12,460 Republican votes for Rob Astorino, 306 Independence votes for Cuomo, 2,709 Conservative votes for Astorino, 289 Working Families Party plus 141 Women's Equality Party votes for Cuomo, and 642 Stop Common Core Party votes for Astorino.

== Geography ==
According to the U.S. Census Bureau, the county has a total area of 1,383 square miles (3,580 km^{2}), of which 604 square miles (1,560 km^{2}) is land and 779 square miles (2,020 km^{2}) (56%) is water.

Wayne County is in the western part of New York State, east of Rochester and northwest of Syracuse, on the south shore of Lake Ontario. Sodus Bay is located on the north shoreline of the county. Wayne is bounded by five other New York counties: the northern boundary is Lake Ontario with Canada on the opposite shore; the western boundary is Monroe County; and the eastern boundary is Cayuga County; the south boundary is shared with Ontario and Seneca counties.

The Clinton Formation, a band of red hematite across the county, led to a thriving iron industry during the 19th century. Furnaces were located in the Towns of Ontario and Wolcott.

Wayne County is included in the Eastern Great Lakes and Hudson Lowlands ecoregion, which extends along the south shores of Lake Erie and Lake Ontario and the St. Lawrence River to Lake Champlain, and south down the Hudson River. This region was glaciated during the last ice age, and contains prominent glacial features including till and drumlins, as well as the valleys containing the Finger Lakes. Part of the area was covered by Glacial Lake Iroquois, while regions further to the east were flooded under the Champlain Sea. At one point during the melting of the glaciers, the Great Lakes drained down the Hudson River to the Atlantic Ocean.

=== Adjacent counties ===
- Cayuga County – east
- Seneca County – southeast
- Ontario County – south
- Monroe County – west

=== Major highways ===
- New York State Route 14
- New York State Route 21
- New York State Route 31
- New York State Route 31F
- New York State Route 88
- New York State Route 89
- New York State Route 104
- New York State Route 104A
- New York State Route 286
- New York State Route 350
- New York State Route 370
- New York State Route 414
- New York State Route 441

=== National protected areas ===
- Lake Ontario National Marine Sanctuary (part)
- Montezuma National Wildlife Refuge (part)

== Demographics ==
Historical population
Census	Pop.	Note	%±
1830	33,643		—
1840	42,057		25.0%
1850	44,953		6.9%
1860	47,762		6.2%
1870	47,710		−0.1%
1880	51,700		8.4%
1890	49,729		−3.8%
1900	48,660		−2.1%
1910	50,179		3.1%
1920	48,827		−2.7%
1930	49,995		2.4%
1940	52,747		5.5%
1950	57,323		8.7%
1960	67,989		18.6%
1970	79,404		16.8%
1980	84,581		6.5%
1990	89,123		5.4%
2000	93,765		5.2%
2010	93,751		0.0%
2020	91,283		−2.6%
2025 (est.)	91,250	▼	0.0%
U.S. Decennial Census; 1790-1960 1900-1990; 1990-2000 2010-2020

=== 2020 census ===
Wayne County, New York – Racial and ethnic composition Note: the US Census treats Hispanic/Latino as an ethnic category. This table excludes Latinos from the racial categories and assigns them to a separate category. Hispanics/Latinos may be of any race.
Race / Ethnicity (NH = Non-Hispanic)	Pop 1980	Pop 1990	Pop 2000	Pop 2010	Pop 2020	% 1980	% 1990	% 2000	% 2010	% 2020
White alone (NH)	80,543	84,263	86,770	85,318	79,230	95.23%	94.55%	92.54%	90.98%	86.80%
Black or African American alone (NH)	2,708	2,735	2,961	2,743	2,397	3.20%	3.07%	3.16%	2.93%	2.63%
Native American or Alaska Native alone (NH)	174	226	208	201	171	0.21%	0.25%	0.22%	0.21%	0.19%
Asian alone (NH)	158	321	429	465	473	0.19%	0.36%	0.46%	0.50%	0.52%
Native Hawaiian or Pacific Islander alone (NH)	x	x	7	24	13	x	x	0.01%	0.03%	0.01%
Other race alone (NH)	118	60	74	59	272	0.14%	0.07%	0.08%	0.06%	0.30%
Mixed race or Multiracial (NH)	x	x	1,053	1,486	4,213	x	x	1.12%	1.58%	4.62%
Hispanic or Latino (any race)	880	1,518	2,263	3,476	4,514	1.04%	1.70%	2.41%	3.71%	4.95%
Total	84,581	89,123	93,765	93,772	91,283	100.00%	100.00%	100.00%	100.00%	100.00%

=== 2010 census ===
As of the census of 2010, there were 93,772 people, 36,585 households, and 25,304 families residing in the county. The population density was 155 inhabitants per square mile (60/km^{2}).

There were 36,585 households, out of which 29.5% had children under the age of 18 living with them, 53.0% were married couples living together, 11.0% had a female householder with no husband present, and 30.8% were non-families. 24.5% of all households were made up of individuals, and 9.8% had someone living alone who was 65 years of age or older. The average household size was 2.53 and the average family size was 2.99.

In the county, the population was spread out, with 26.2% under the age of 20, 5.1% from 20 to 24, 23.8% from 25 to 44, 30.7% from 45 to 64, and 14.2% who were 65 years of age or older. The median age was 41.6 years. For every 100 females, there were 98.5 males. For every 100 females age 18 and over, there were 97.3 males.

The median income for a household in the county was $52,601, and the median income for a family was $62,677. Males had a median income of $47,056 versus $35,684 for females. The per capita income for the county was $25,327. About 7.8% of families and 11.3% of the population were below the poverty line, including 16.4% of those under age 18 and 6.9% of those age 65 or over.

=== Recent racial/ethnic makeup ===
As of the 2013 American Community Survey, the racial makeup of the county was 93.3% White alone, 3.6% African American alone, 0.3% Native American, 0.7% Asian, 0.0% Pacific Islander, and 1.4% from two or more races. Hispanic or Latino of any race were 3.8% of the population, while white alone, not Hispanic or Latino, constituted 94.6% of the population.

=== Housing ===
There were 41,057 housing units at an average density of 68 units per square mile (26 units/km^{2}). 10.9% of housing units were vacant.

There were 36,585 occupied housing units in the town. 28,106 were owner-occupied units (76.8%), while 8,479 were renter-occupied (23.2%). The homeowner vacancy rate was 1.5% of total units. The rental unit vacancy rate was 9.4%.

=== Earlier demographic statistics ===
Families made up 70 percent of the households in Wayne County in 2005. This figure includes both married-couple families (59 percent) and other families (12 percent). Non-family households made up 30 percent of all households. Most of these households were people living alone, but some were composed of people living in households in which no one was related to the householder. Source: American Community Survey, 2005 18.0% were of German, 12.8% Italian, 12.6% English, 11.6% Dutch, 11.4% Irish and 8.9% American ancestry according to Census 2000. 95.7% spoke English as their first language, 2.2% Spanish, 1.8% spoke French and 0.2% spoke another language.

== Economy ==
According to the Wayne County Industrial Development Agency, there are over 150 manufacturing firms in Wayne County, including several Fortune 500 companies located in the county based on market access, a modern transportation network, and favorable industrial conditions. These companies benefit from a skilled workforce including graduates from some of the colleges and universities located within an hour's drive of Wayne County including the University of Rochester, Cornell University, Colgate University and Syracuse University. From its location midway between Rochester and Syracuse, Wayne County is part of the Finger Lakes region (which includes Cayuga, Genesee, Livingston, Monroe, Ontario, Orleans, Seneca, Wayne, Wyoming, and Yates counties) whose businesses annually export an estimated $16 billion in goods.

The Finger Lakes region made $1.2 billion (~$1.79 billion in 2025) in agricultural sales in 2007, which represented 27.9 percent of the total farm sales in New York. In 2007, there were 6,417 farms and 1,500,000 acres (6,100 km^{2}) of farmland in the Finger Lakes. Wayne County was the State's top producer of fruits, tree nuts, and berries. Apples are a major crop in Wayne—the county was the State's top producer of apples and ranked third in the nation in 2007.

The following quick facts apply to Wayne County businesses:

- Total employer establishments, 2021 1,676
- Total employment, 2021 19,136
- Total employment, percent change 2020–2021 -6.0%
- Total nonemployer establishments, 2021 5,023
- All employer firms, reference year 2017 1,494
- Men-owned employer firms, reference year 2017 990
- Women-owned employer firms, reference year 2017 Suppressed; does not meet publication standards [sic]
- Minority-owned employer firms, reference year 2017 69
- Nonminority-owned employer firms, reference year 2017 1,249
- Veteran-owned employer firms, reference year 2017 Suppressed
- Nonveteran-owned employer firms, reference year 2017 1,191
- Total health care and social assistance receipts/revenues, 2017 ($1000) 228,084
- Total transportation and warehousing receipts/revenues, 2017 ($1000) 34,592
- Total retail sales, 2017 ($1000) 997,103
- Total retail sales per capita, 2017 $11,026
- Total accommodation and foodservices sales, 2017 ($1000) 78,377
- Building permits, 2023 172

== Education ==
Wayne County does not have a single unified school district to deliver K-12 education, but multiple central school districts. Each district is governed by a locally-elected board of education, run by a hired superintendent, and funded largely through property taxes, as well as state and federal aid. These districts include:

- Palmyra-Macedon Central School District
- Wayne Central School District
- Gananda Central School District
- Newark Central School District
- Marion Central School District
- Williamson Central School District
- Lyons Central School District
- North Rose-Wolcott Central School District
- Red Creek Central School District
- Sodus Central School District
- Clyde-Savannah Central School District

As with all educational activities in New York State, Wayne County's school systems are ultimately answerable to the New York State Board of Regents and the New York State Education Department, as well as their local communities. These districts also participate in the Wayne Finger Lakes Board of Cooperative Educational Services (BOCES), a state-established organization which shares common educational resources and has its own elected board and superintendent.

Wayne County also has several private, parochial/religiously-based schools, including:

- East Palmyra Christian School
- Heritage Baptist Christian School, Palmyra

Wayne County is not home to any regionally-accredited institutions of higher learning, but has a satellite campus of Finger Lakes Community College in Newark to serve the associate degree-level learner and has access to many public and private colleges along with universities in immediately adjacent counties (such as SUNY Brockport, SUNY Oswego, University of Rochester, and Hobart and William Smith Colleges, Cayuga Community College to name a few.)

== Culture ==
Wayne County is home to several festivals and parades, most from late spring through early fall due to the Upstate New York climate. Some of the more notable, listed in order of occurrence, include:

- Apple Blossom Festival (Williamson, third week in May)
- Peppermint Days (Lyons, second weekend in July)
- Rose Parade (Newark, third weekend in July)
- Hill Cumorah Pageant (Palmyra and Manchester, Ontario County, formerly third week in July, permanently canceled after 2019)
- Pultneyville Homecoming Festivities Historic Hamlet of Pultneyville in Town of Williamson, Wayne County on Seaway Trail; www.w-phs.org (3rd weekend every July)
- CNY Wine & Jazz Festival (Wolcott, first Saturday in August)
- Palmyra Pirate Weekend including "Pirates of the Erie Canal", (Palmyra, Second weekend in August)
- Wayne County Fair (Palmyra, second week in August)
- Lumberjack Festival (Macedon Center, second weekend in September)
- Canaltown Days (Palmyra, third weekend in September)
- Savannah's Potato Festival (Savannah, third weekend in September)
- The Bog & Grog (Wallington, 1st Sunday after Mother's Day and 1st Sunday after Labor Day

Also, many of Wayne County's volunteer fire departments host "firemen's carnivals" throughout the summer, with parades, rides, food, fireworks, and attractions which become a centerpiece of the summer social circuit.

== Communities ==
The county has no cities. There are 15 towns and seven villages.

=== Larger settlements ===
#	Location	Population	Type	Area
1	Newark	9,145	Village	West
2	‡Lyons	3,619	CDP	East
3	Palmyra	3,536	Village	West
4	Williamson	2,495	CDP	Lake Shore
5	Ontario	2,160	CDP	Lake Shore
6	Clyde	2,093	Village	East
7	Sodus	1,819	Village	Lake Shore
8	Wolcott	1,701	Village	Lake Shore
9	†Macedon	1,523	CDP	West
10	Marion	1,511	CDP	West
11	Sodus Point	900	Village	Lake Shore
12	Pultneyville	698	CDP	Lake Shore
13	North Rose	636	CDP	East
14	†Savannah	558	CDP	East
15	Red Creek	532	Village	Lake Shore
-	Gananda	N/A	CDP	West
-	Walworth	N/A	CDP	West

=== Towns ===
- Arcadia
- Butler
- Galen
- Huron
- Lyons
- Macedon
- Marion
- Ontario
- Palmyra
- Rose
- Savannah
- Sodus
- Walworth
- Williamson
- Wolcott

=== Villages ===
- Clyde
- Newark
- Palmyra
- Red Creek
- Sodus
- Sodus Point
- Wolcott

=== Other communities ===
Wayne county has a number of unincorporated communities. Most are considered hamlets.

- Alloway
- Alton
- Angells Corners
- Bear Creek
- Bonnie Castle
- Butler Center
- Desbrough Park
- East Bay Park
- East Palmyra
- East Williamson
- Evans Corner
- Fairville
- Fairville Station
- Fort Hill
- Furnace Village
- Furnaceville
- Glenmark
- Huddle
- Huron
- Hydesville
- Joy
- Lake Bluff
- Lakeside
- Lincoln
- Lock Berlin
- Lockpit
- Lummisville
- Macedon Center
- Marbletown
- Marengo
- Minsteed
- Mud Mills
- Noble Corner
- North Huron
- North Macedon
- North Wolcott
- Ontario Center
- Ontario-on-the-Lake
- Owls Nest
- Pilgrimport
- Pultneyville
- Resort
- Rice Mill
- Rose
- Shaker Heights
- Shephards Corner
- Sodus Center
- South Butler
- South Sodus
- Sunset View
- Thorntons Corner
- Union Hill
- Wallington
- Wayne Center
- Wayneport
- West Butler
- West Walworth
- Westbury
- Yellow Mills
- York
- Zurich

== See also ==
- List of counties in New York
- National Register of Historic Places listings in Wayne County, New York
