= New York State Route 259 =

State highway in Monroe County, New York, US

New York State Route 259
- Map of the Rochester area with NY 259 highlighted in red

Route information
- Maintained by NYSDOT
- Length: 17.11 mi (27.54 km)
- Existed: 1930–present

Major junctions
- South end: NY 33A in Chili
- I-490 in Chili; NY 531 in Ogden
- North end: Lake Ontario State Parkway in Parma

Location
- Country: United States
- State: New York
- Counties: Monroe

Highway system
- New York Highways; Interstate; US; State; Reference; Parkways
← NY 258	→ NY 260

New York State Route 259 (NY 259) is a north–south state highway located west of Rochester in Monroe County, New York, in the United States. The southern terminus of the route is at an intersection with NY 33A in the hamlet of West Chili within the town of Chili. Its northern terminus is at a junction with the Lake Ontario State Parkway in Parma near the Lake Ontario shoreline. NY 259 meets Interstate 490 (I-490) in Chili and NY 531 south of Spencerport. The junction with I-490 is less than 0.2 miles (0.3 km) from where NY 259 begins at NY 33A.

All of NY 259 south of Curtis Road in Parma was assigned as part of the 1930 renumbering of state highways in New York. The route was extended north to the Lake Ontario shoreline in the late 1950s to meet the Lake Ontario State Parkway. This northward extension was originally maintained by Monroe County as the unsigned County Route 226 (CR 226); however, ownership and maintenance of CR 226 south of the Lake Ontario State Parkway was transferred from Monroe County to the state of New York in 2007 as part of a highway maintenance swap between the two levels of government.

== Route description ==
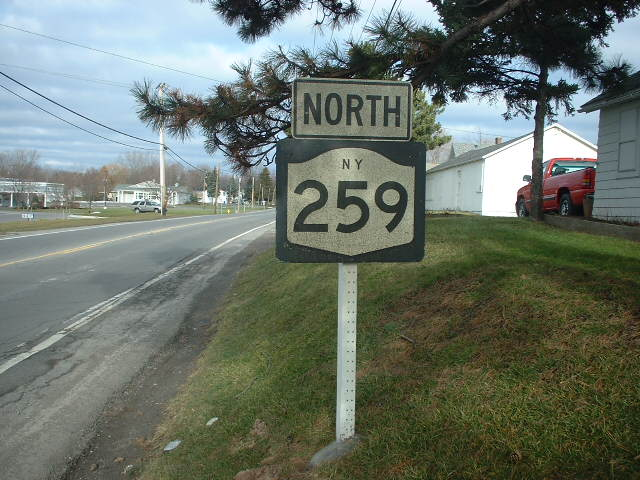
2000 photo of old signage along NY 259 in the town of Chili. This sign has since been removed.

Like Manitou Road in Greece, which changes from a county route to NY 261 after crossing NY 104, Union Street transitions from CR 170 to NY 259 at an intersection with NY 33A in West Chili, a hamlet within the Monroe County town of Chili. Just north of this intersection, NY 259 connects to I-490 at exit 4. Continuing on, the route crosses the CSX Transportation-owned West Shore Subdivision railroad line, as well as the Rochester Subdivision line, prior to intersecting NY 33 in North Chili. NY 259 crosses into the town of Ogden shortly afterward.

In Ogden, NY 259 takes a direct north–south alignment between the town line and the village of Spencerport. Over this stretch, NY 259 meets NY 531 (the Spencerport Expressway) by way of an interchange. In Spencerport, NY 259 meets NY 31, becoming South Union Street, and crosses over the Erie Canal, at which point the route becomes North Union Street. North of the village, the route becomes Union Street again, swerves to the northeast and enters the town of Parma before returning to a northerly alignment at an intersection with NY 104 in the hamlet of Parma Corners. To the north of NY 104, NY 259 is known as Hilton–Parma Corners Road as it heads through a rural portion of the town. It intersects NY 18 south of the village of Hilton in the hamlet of Parma Center, then overlaps NY 18 northward for two miles (3 km) to Hilton, where it becomes South Avenue upon entering the village, then turning left on Main Street. The two routes split in the village center, with NY 18 continuing on West Avenue and NY 259 turning on Lake Avenue. NY 259 undergoes a name change at the Hilton village line, changing from Lake Avenue within the village to North Avenue outside of Hilton as it continues toward Lake Ontario. The route heads north, then northeast through a hilly, rural portion of northwestern Monroe County to a junction with the Lake Ontario State Parkway just south of the shoreline. NY 259 ends here; however, North Avenue continues north for 50 yards (46 m) to a dead end at the lakeshore.

== History ==
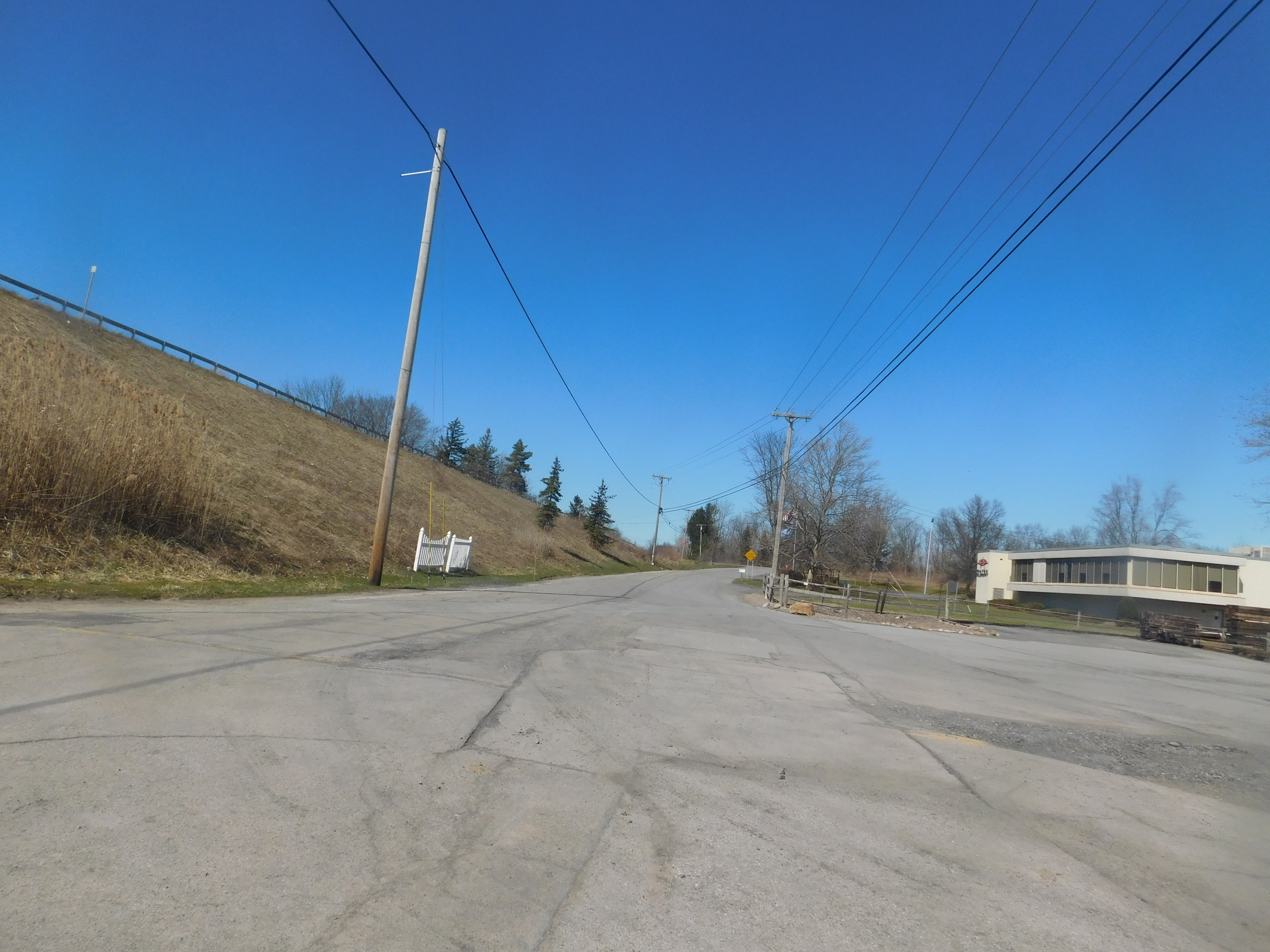
The former alignment of NY 259 in North Chili

NY 259 was assigned as part of the 1930 renumbering of state highways in New York to the portion of its modern alignment between NY 33A in Chili and Curtis Road in Parma. The route was extended north toward the Lake Ontario shoreline in the late 1950s to meet the Lake Ontario State Parkway. This northward extension was initially maintained by Monroe County as CR 226, an unsigned route that continued north of the parkway to the lake along North Avenue. In 2007, ownership and maintenance of CR 226 south of the Lake Ontario State Parkway was transferred from Monroe County to the state of New York as part of a highway maintenance swap between the two levels of government. A bill (S4856, 2007) to enact the swap was introduced in the New York State Senate on April 23 and passed by both the Senate and the New York State Assembly on June 20. The act was signed into law by Governor Eliot Spitzer on August 28. Under the terms of the act, it took effect 90 days after it was signed into law; thus, the maintenance swap officially took place on November 26, 2007. The entirety of NY 259 is now state-maintained. CR 226, meanwhile, no longer exists in any form as the remainder of the route north to the lakeshore was transferred to the town of Parma by March 2009.

== Major intersections ==
The entire route is in Monroe County.

Location	mi	km	Destinations	Notes
Chili	0.00	0.00	NY 33A	Southern terminus; hamlet of West Chili
Chili	0.16	0.26	I-490 – Rochester	Exit 4 on I-490
Chili	1.88	3.03	NY 33	Hamlet of North Chili
Ogden	5.96	9.59	NY 531 to I-490	Interchange
Spencerport	6.19	9.96	NY 31	
Parma	11.68	18.80	NY 104	Hamlet of Parma Corners
Parma	11.68	18.80	NY 18 east	South end of NY 18 overlap; hamlet of Parma Center
Hilton	13.77	22.16	NY 18 west	North end of NY 18 verlap
Parma	17.11	27.54	Lake Ontario State Parkway	Northern terminus
1.000 mi = 1.609 km; 1.000 km = 0.621 mi: Concurrency terminus

== See also ==
- List of county routes in Monroe County, New York
