= List of county routes in Monroe County, New York =

Example of a Monroe County route reference marker

The Monroe County, New York, Department of Transportation maintains 663 miles (1,067 km) of roads as county routes. Unlike most counties in New York, Monroe County does not post reassurance markers along its county routes. In fact, the only field reference to a route's designation are reference markers posted at bridges and culverts along the highway, which carry the county route number on the second line. Routes that do not cross either type of structure at some point are completely unsigned. As a result, county routes in Monroe County are widely known by their road name and not by their number.

Route numbers were initially assigned across the county from east to west, beginning at the Wayne County line and generally progressing westward to the Orleans County line. Subsequent routes (those above County Route 238 or CR 238) do not follow this pattern and are located in all areas of the county. As a general rule, east–west routes have designations ending in an odd number while north–south highways carry designations ending in an even number. Several county routes partially or wholly overlap with New York state touring routes, serving as internal designations for county-maintained segments of those routes.

== 2007 system changes ==
Several county routes were created, modified, or eliminated following a November 26, 2007, highway maintenance swap between Monroe County and the state of New York. The transaction gave ownership of several county highways to the state, specifically county-maintained sections of New York State Route 19 (NY 19), NY 31, NY 252, NY 259, NY 260, and NY 441, and the county-owned Colonel Patrick O'Rorke Memorial Bridge. In return, the county assumed maintenance of five reference routes (NY 940G, NY 941L, NY 941P, NY 942B, and NY 943B), two sections of NY 386, and all of NY 252A and NY 360.

All of the county route numbers assigned to the formerly county-owned sections of state routes were eliminated except for CR 236, assigned to a portion of NY 31 on Redman Road west of Brockport, and CR 99, assigned to the O'Rorke Bridge and Pattonwood Drive between the Rochester city line and CR 124. The now-state-owned section of Redman Road split the formerly continuous CR 236 into two segments, while CR 99 was truncated to begin at the east end of the new NY 943F at CR 124.

CR 236 was also one of several routes that gained mileage as part of the swap. The highway was extended northward from its previous terminus at the junction of Redman and Church (NY 360) roads to cover two previously state-maintained sections of Redman Road in the far northwestern corner of the county, creating an overlap with part of NY 360 and replacing NY 941P, itself formerly NY 215. CR 1, previously assigned to the portion of Lake Road east of NY 250, was extended west to the Irondequoit Bay outlet over former NY 941L, once the easternmost segment of NY 18. CR 270 and CR 84 were also extended to cover NY 942B and NY 940G, respectively.

Four other routes—CR 119, CR 158, CR 168, and CR 234—were modified to cover now county-owned parts of NY 252A, NY 360, and NY 386 that connected to one of the county route's previous endpoints. Lastly, four additional highways transferred to the county—two sections of NY 386, a piece of NY 360, and NY 943B—received new county route designations.

== Routes 1–50 ==
Route	Length (mi)	Length (km)	From	Via	To	Notes
CR 1	8.59	13.82	Irondequoit Bay Outlet Bridge	Lake Road in Webster	Wayne County line (becomes CR 101)	Part west of NY 250 was formerly NY 941L
CR 2	3.01	4.84	Whitney Road	Monroe–Wayne County Line Road in Webster	Wayne County line (becomes CR 100)	
CR 3	2.69	4.33	NY 250	Schlegel Road in Webster	CR 2	
CR 4	3.32	5.34	NY 404	Basket Road in Webster	CR 1	
CR 5	4.59	7.39	CR 16	Klem Road in Webster	CR 8	
CR 6	9.53	15.34	NY 441 / CR 30 in Penfield	Salt Road	CR 1 in Webster	
CR 7			CR 16	Ridge Road in Webster	NY 404	Former number; transferred to town in 1990s
CR 8	4.38	7.05	CR 9	Phillips Road in Webster	CR 1	
CR 9	5.24	8.43	CR 11 in Penfield	State Road	CR 2 in Webster	
CR 10	3.46	5.57	NY 404	Holt Road in Webster	CR 1	
CR 11	6.77	10.90	NY 404	Plank Road in Penfield	Wayne County line (becomes CR 201)	
CR 12	1.77	2.85	CR 5	Whiting Road in Webster	CR 1	
CR 13	2.90	4.67	NY 286	Whalen Road in Penfield	NY 250	
CR 14	2.22	3.57	NY 404	Gravel Road in Webster	CR 5	
CR 15	2.35	3.78	Brighton town line in Penfield	Linden Avenue	CR 17 in Perinton	Part east of NY 153 was formerly part of NY 253
CR 16	3.75	6.04	NY 404 / CR 22 in Penfield	Bay Road	CR 1 in Webster	
CR 17	4.61	7.42	CR 18 at Penfield town line	Whitney Road in Perinton	CR 42	Part north of CR 15 was formerly part of NY 253
CR 18	7.46	12.01	CR 17 at Perinton town line in Penfield	Five Mile Line Road	CR 5 in Webster	Part south of NY 441 was formerly part of NY 253
CR 19			CR 28	Furman Road in Perinton	CR 30	Former number
CR 20	4.33	6.97	CR 260 in Penfield	Jackson Road	NY 404 in Webster	
CR 21	4.35	7.00	NY 31	Ayrault Road in Perinton	CR 46	
CR 22	2.54	4.09	NY 286 / Blossom Road (NY 941V)	Creek Street in Penfield	NY 404 / CR 16	
CR 23	2.05	3.30	NY 96	Garnsey Road in Perinton	CR 50	
CR 24			CR 13	Scribner Road in Penfield	NY 286	Former number
CR 25	1.63	2.62	CR 56 in Pittsford	Park Road	NY 96 in Perinton	
CR 26	5.04	8.11	NY 441 / CR 28 in Penfield	Harris Road	CR 9 in Webster	
CR 27	1.63	2.62	NY 96	Kreag Road in Perinton	CR 21	
CR 28	0.46	0.74	Perinton town line	Huber Road in Penfield	NY 441 / CR 26	
CR 29	0.88	1.42	CR 68 in Pittsford	Woolston Road	Powder Mills Park east boundary in Perinton	
CR 30	1.55	2.49	CR 17 in Perinton	Carter Road	NY 441 / CR 6 in Penfield	
CR 31 (1)	2.77	4.46	NY 65 in Pittsford	Canfield Road	CR 66 in Mendon	
CR 31 (2)	0.41	0.66	CR 66	Canfield Road in Pittsford	NY 64	
CR 31 (3)	0.02	0.03	NY 65	Canfield Road Spur in Pittsford	CR 31 (1)	
CR 31 (4)	0.04	0.06	CR 31 (1)	Canfield Road Spur in Mendon	CR 64	
CR 32	1.54	2.48	CR 17 / CR 50 in Perinton	Watson Road	NY 441 in Penfield	
CR 33	2.46	3.96	CR 66 in Pittsford	Thornell Road	NY 96 in Perinton	
CR 34	2.19	3.52	NY 31F in Perinton	Baird Road	NY 441 in Penfield	
CR 35	1.39	2.24	NY 153 in Pittsford	Golf Avenue	CR 38 in Perinton	
CR 36	0.95	1.53	NY 31F / CR 38 in Perinton	South Lincoln Road	Despatch Drive in East Rochester	
CR 37	3.10	4.99	CR 92 in Henrietta	Stone Road	NY 64 / Mendon Center Road (NY 943C) in Pittsford	
CR 38	3.57	5.75	NY 96 in Perinton	Marsh Road	NY 31F / CR 36 in Perinton	
CR 39	4.98	8.01	NY 15 in Henrietta	Calkins Road	NY 65 / Mendon Center Road (NY 943C) in Pittsford	
CR 40	1.55	2.49	CR 21	Jefferson Avenue in Perinton	NY 31F	
CR 41	1.09	1.75	NY 65	Willard Road in Pittsford	CR 64	
CR 42	1.01	1.63	NY 31F	Howell Road in Perinton	CR 17	
CR 43	1.43	2.30	CR 92 in Henrietta	Williams Road	NY 65 / CR 45 in Mendon	
CR 44	1.05	1.69	CR 21	Lyndon Road in Perinton	NY 31F	
CR 45 (1)	3.64	5.86	NY 65 / CR 43	Pond Road in Mendon	CR 66	
CR 45 (2)	0.03	0.05	NY 65	Pond Road Spur in Mendon	CR 45 (1)	
CR 46	1.03	1.66	NY 31	Aldrich Road in Perinton	CR 21	
CR 47	2.85	4.59	CR 64	Smith Road in Mendon	CR 70	
CR 48			NY 31	Mason Road in Perinton	CR 21	Former number
CR 49	4.63	7.45	NY 65	Cheese Factory Road in Mendon	NY 64	
CR 50	5.19	8.35	Ontario County line in Perinton	Turk Hill Road	CR 17 / CR 32 in Perinton	Overlaps with NY 31F between Church Street and High Street in Fairport

== Routes 51–100 ==
Route	Length (mi)	Length (km)	From	Via	To	Notes
CR 51	1.95	3.14	CR 66	Parish Road in Mendon	NY 64	
CR 52	2.11	3.40	Ontario County line (becomes CR 9)	Victor Road in Perinton	NY 31	Also known as "Victor-Egypt Road"
CR 53	4.62	7.44	CR 243 at Honeoye Falls village line	Boughton Hill Road in Mendon	Ontario County line (becomes CR 41)	
CR 54			Ontario County line	Fishers Road in Perinton	NY 96	Former number
CR 55	1.98	3.19	CR 64	Bulls Saw Mill Road in Mendon	CR 66	
CR 56	2.95	4.75	CR 70 at Mendon town line	East Street in Pittsford	NY 96	
CR 57	0.41	0.66	NY 251	Stoney Lonesome Road in Mendon	NY 65	
CR 58			NY 96 in Pittsford	South Street	NY 31 in Pittsford village	Former number
CR 59	1.36	2.19	NY 15A	Sibley Road in Mendon	NY 65	
CR 60	0.33	0.53	NY 31 / CR 239	Allen Creek Road in Brighton	NY 65 / CR 271	
CR 61	0.49	0.79	Monroe Street (NY 940J)	Maplewood Avenue in Honeoye Falls	NY 65	
CR 62 (1)	0.59	0.95	CR 64 / Calkins Road (NY 943C)	Tobey Road in Pittsford	CR 37	
CR 62 (2)	0.81	1.30	CR 37	Tobey Road in Pittsford	NY 65	
CR 63	6.04	9.72	CR 84 in Rush	Honeoye Falls No. 6 Road	CR 94 at Honeoye Falls village line in Mendon	
CR 64	5.35	8.61	NY 251 in Mendon	Mendon Center Road	CR 62 / Calkins Road (NY 943C) in Pittsford	
CR 65	3.10	4.99	CR 94	Rush–West Rush Road in Rush	NY 15A	
CR 66	8.31	13.37	Ontario County line in Mendon (becomes CR 35)	West Bloomfield Road	NY 64 in Pittsford	
CR 67	3.70	5.95	CR 84	Rush–Henrietta Town Line Road	NY 15A	
CR 68	0.81	1.30	CR 29	Railroad Mills Road in Pittsford	CR 25	
CR 69	1.01	1.63	NY 15A	Ward Hill Road in Henrietta	CR 92	
CR 70	2.63	4.23	NY 251	Mile Square Road in Mendon	CR 56 at Pittsford town line	
CR 71	2.01	3.23	NY 15 / Erie Station Road (NY 943E)	Erie Station Road in Henrietta	NY 15A	
CR 73	0.41	0.66	CR 92	Reeves Road in Henrietta	CR 90	
CR 74	1.56	2.51	CR 45	Douglas Road in Mendon	CR 31	
CR 75	0.99	1.59	CR 84	Martin Road in Henrietta	CR 86	Former number
CR 76	1.42	2.29	CR 78	Phelps Road in Rush	NY 15A	
CR 77	1.84	2.96	CR 84	Brooks Road in Henrietta	NY 15 / NY 253	
CR 78	2.39	3.85	Livingston County line (becomes CR 65)	Works Road in Rush	CR 76	
CR 79	1.91	3.07	CR 84	Lehigh Station Road in Henrietta	NY 15 / NY 253	
CR 80	2.52	4.06	CR 63	Five Points Road in Rush	CR 65	
CR 81	2.24	3.60	CR 84	Bailey Road in Henrietta	NY 15	
CR 82	1.41	2.27	CR 63	Woodruff Road in Rush	CR 84	
CR 83	3.07	4.94	CR 84	Crittenden Road in Brighton	NY 15A	
CR 84 (1)	13.29	21.39	Livingston County line in Rush (becomes CR 26)	East River Road	Rochester city line at Genesee Valley Park	Part north of NY 252 was formerly NY 940G
CR 84 (2)	0.73	1.17	Rochester city line at Genesee Valley Park	East River Road in Brighton	NY 15	
CR 85	3.65	5.87	NY 252	Brighton–Henrietta Town Line Road	CR 98	
CR 86	3.19	5.13	CR 84 in Rush	Telephone Road	NY 15 in Henrietta	
CR 87	3.85	6.20	Rochester city line	Elmwood Avenue in Brighton	NY 96 / NY 441	Part west of I-590 was formerly part of NY 47
CR 88	4.78	7.69	NY 251 in Rush	Middle Road	CR 39 in Henrietta	
CR 89	0.85	1.37	Rochester city line	Norton Street in Irondequoit	NY 590 exit 9	
CR 90	1.03	1.66	CR 73 in Henrietta	Tobin Road	NY 65 in Pittsford	
CR 91	3.19	5.13	CR 122	Titus Avenue in Irondequoit	NY 590	
CR 92	6.32	10.17	NY 251 in Rush	Pinnacle Road	NY 252 in Henrietta	
CR 93			CR 122	Pinegrove Avenue in Irondequoit	Rochester city line	Former number; road transferred to town in the 1990s
CR 94	0.91	1.46	NY 65 / Monroe Street (NY 940J)	West Main Street in Honeoye Falls	CR 63 at Honeoye Falls village line	
CR 95			Rochester city line	Seneca Park Avenue in Irondequoit	CR 122	Former number; road transferred to town in the 1990s
CR 96			CR 39	Clay Road	NY 252	Former number; part south of I-390 now part of CR 263
CR 97	3.22	5.18	CR 122 in Irondequoit	Lake Shore Boulevard and Pine Valley and Sweet Fern roads	CR 120 in Rochester	
CR 98 (1)	4.10	6.60	CR 92 in Henrietta	Winton Road South	Rochester city line	Part north of CR 87 was formerly part of NY 47
CR 98 (2)	0.73	1.17	Rochester city line	Winton Road North	NY 404	Formerly part of NY 47
CR 99	0.56	0.90	CR 124 / Pattonwood Drive (NY 943F)	Pattonwood Drive in Irondequoit	CR 122	
CR 100	2.77	4.46	CR 85	South Clinton Avenue in Brighton	Rochester city line	

== Routes 101–150 ==
Route	Length (mi)	Length (km)	From	Via	To	Notes
CR 101	1.53	2.46	CR 150	Britton Road in Greece	Rochester city line	
CR 102	2.34	3.77	NY 252 in Henrietta	Edgewood Avenue	NY 31 in Brighton	
CR 103	0.94	1.51	CR 142	Kuhn Road in Greece	CR 136	
CR 104			Blossom Road (NY 941V)	North Landing Road in Brighton	NY 286	Former number; road transferred to town in the 1990s
CR 105	0.88	1.42	NY 261	Hincher Road in Greece	CR 144	
CR 106			Empire Boulevard (NY 941B)	Helendale Road in Webster	CR 89	Former number; road transferred to town in the 1990s
CR 107 (1)	0.90	1.45	NY 261 / CR 193	Frisbee Hill Road in Greece	CR 144	
CR 107 (2)	0.87	1.40	CR 144	Frisbee Hill Road in Greece	CR 138 / CR 142	
CR 108	0.76	1.22	Rochester city line	North Goodman Street in Irondequoit	CR 118 / CR 241	
CR 109	3.73	6.00	CR 144	English Road in Greece	CR 150	
CR 110			CR 241	Bouckhart Avenue in Irondequoit	CR 91	Former number; road transferred to town in the 1990s
CR 111 (1)	1.08	1.74	CR 208	Ridgeway Avenue in Greece	NY 386/CR 158	
CR 111 (2)	3.55	5.71	NY 386/CR 158/St. Pierre Drive	Ridgeway Avenue in Greece	Rochester city line	
CR 112	1.08	1.74	Rochester city line	Hudson Avenue in Irondequoit	CR 91	
CR 113	1.32	2.12	NY 259 / CR 175 in Spencerport	Big Ridge Road	CR 210 in Ogden	
CR 114	1.39	2.24	Rochester city line	Portland Avenue in Irondequoit	CR 91	
CR 115	1.09	1.75	CR 136	Trolley Boulevard in Gates	CR 154	
CR 116	0.83	1.34	CR 91	Cooper Road in Irondequoit	CR 122	
CR 117 (1)	1.05	1.69	CR 210	Lyell Road in Ogden	CR 208	
CR 117 (2)	3.20	5.15	CR 208	Lyell Road in Gates	Howard Road (NY 940L) in Gates	
CR 118	3.01	4.84	CR 108 / CR 241 in Irondequoit	Kings Highway	CR 97 in Rochester	
CR 119	8.09	13.02	NY 36 in Ogden	West Side Drive	NY 33A in Gates	Briefly overlaps with NY 386 near Chili Center
CR 120	3.89	6.26	Rochester city line	Culver Road in Rochester and Irondequoit	Irondequoit Bay Outlet Bridge	
CR 121 (1)	1.08	1.74	NY 33A	Chestnut Ridge Road in Chili	CR 168	
CR 121 (2)	2.16	3.48	CR 168	Chestnut Ridge Road in Chili	NY 33A	
CR 122	4.55	7.32	Rochester city line	St. Paul Boulevard in Irondequoit	Cul-de-sac at Lake Ontario	
CR 123	1.16	1.87	NY 259	King Road in Chili	CR 168	
CR 124	1.46	2.35	CR 122	Thomas Avenue in Irondequoit	CR 99 / Pattonwood Drive (NY 943F)	
CR 125			CR 129 at Archer Road	Ballantyne Road	NY 383	Entire length overlapped with NY 252; transferred to state on November 26, 2007
CR 126	1.06	1.71	Latta Road (NY 941A)	Greenleaf Road in Greece	CR 128	
CR 127			NY 33A	Beaver Road	CR 129 at Archer Road	Entire length overlapped with NY 252; transferred to state on November 26, 2007
CR 128	1.03	1.66	CR 132	Beach Avenue in Greece	Rochester city line	
CR 129			CR 127 at Archer Road	Archer Road	CR 125 at Ballantyne Road	Entire length overlapped with NY 252; transferred to state on November 26, 2007
CR 130	4.52	7.27	CR 140	Edgemere Drive in Greece	CR 128	
CR 131	1.67	2.69	CR 194 in Riga	Davis Road	NY 259 / CR 168 in Chili	
CR 132	4.31	6.94	Rochester city line	Dewey Avenue in Greece	CR 130	Part south of Latta Road overlaps NY 18
CR 133	4.92	7.92	CR 155 / CR 190	Morgan Road in Chili	NY 383	
CR 134	2.09	3.36	NY 18	Island Cottage Road in Greece	CR 130	
CR 135	0.27	0.43	CR 190	Clifton Road in Chili	CR 174	
CR 136	9.43	15.18	CR 117 in Gates	Long Pond Road	CR 130 in Greece	
CR 137	0.87	1.40	CR 174	Wickens Road in Chili	CR 170	
CR 138	1.76	2.83	CR 107 / CR 142	Lowden Point Road in Greece	CR 130	
CR 139	8.47	13.63	Genesee County line in Wheatland (becomes CR 40)	North Road	NY 253 / NY 383 in Scottsville	
CR 140	1.99	3.20	CR 107	East Manitou Road in Greece	CR 130	
CR 141	4.03	6.49	CR 174	South Road in Wheatland	River Road (NY 940H)	
CR 142	2.31	3.72	NY 18	Flynn Road in Greece	CR 107 / CR 138	
CR 143	0.98	1.58	CR 132	Ling Road in Greece	CR 126	
CR 144	5.73	9.22	NY 104 / NY 386 / CR 158	North Greece Road in Greece	CR 105	
CR 145	0.53	0.85	NY 36 / CR 265	State Street in Wheatland	CR 178	
CR 146	1.84	2.96	NY 104	North Avenue in Greece	CR 109	
CR 147	2.03	3.27	Genesee County line (becomes CR 25)	Flint Hill Road in Wheatland	CR 265	
CR 148	1.50	2.41	NY 104	Stone Road in Greece	Whitman Road	
CR 149	1.57	2.53	CR 196	Bovee Road in Riga	CR 182	
CR 150	3.33	5.36	Joanne Drive (becomes NY 940K)	Mount Read Boulevard in Greece	NY 18	

== Routes 151–200 ==
Route	Length (mi)	Length (km)	From	Via	To	Notes
CR 151	1.13	1.82	CR 188 at Wheatland town line	Hosmer Road in Riga	CR 190 at Chili town line	
CR 152	1.05	1.69	CR 111 / CR 154	Latona Road in Greece	NY 104 / CR 264	
CR 153	0.97	1.56	CR 182	Bridgeman Road in Riga	NY 36	
CR 154 (1)	0.52	0.84	NY 31	Lee Road in Gates	Rochester city line	
CR 154 (2)	0.84	1.35	Rochester city line	Lee Road in Greece	CR 111/CR 152	
CR 155	2.99	4.81	NY 36	Griffin Road in Riga	CR 133 / CR 190	
CR 156	1.21	1.95	NY 33	Wegman Road in Gates	CR 117	
CR 157	1.34	2.16	NY 36	Robertson Road in Riga	CR 184	
CR 158	4.88	7.85	NY 33 in Gates	Elmgrove Road	NY 104 / CR 144 in Greece	Entire length overlaps with NY 386
CR 159	2.11	3.40	CR 258 at Churchville village line	Savage Road in Riga	CR 194	
CR 160	1.80	2.90	NY 33A in Chili	Pixley Road	NY 33 in Gates	
CR 161	2.32	3.73	NY 33	Bromley Road in Riga	CR 194	NY 33A erroneously listed as Start of Section in 'County Roads Listing – Monroe County'
CR 162	0.65	1.05	NY 204	Buell Road in Gates	NY 33A	
CR 163	0.74	1.19	CR 204 in Riga	Kendall Road	CR 165 / CR 268 in Churchville	
CR 164	1.93	3.11	NY 252A / CR 168 in Chili	Beahan Road	NY 33A / NY 204 / Howard Road (NY 940L) in Gates	Part northwest of Rochester and Southern Railroad was formerly part of NY 47
CR 165	0.80	1.29	CR 163 / CR 268	Gilman Road in Riga	NY 36	
CR 166	2.10	3.38	CR 245	Beulah Road in Wheatland	CR 182 at Riga town line	
CR 167	2.53	4.07	CR 235 at Sweden town line	Dewey Street in Ogden	NY 36	
CR 168 (1)	2.44	3.93	Dead end at Rochester Subdivision (CSXT) rail line	Paul Road in Chili	NY 33A/NY 386	
CR 168 (2)	4.41	7.10	NY 33A/NY 386/CR 256	Paul Road in Chili	NY 383	Entire length overlapped with NY 252A from 2007 to 2009
CR 169	4.10	6.60	NY 36	Stony Point Road in Ogden	NY 33	
CR 170 (1)	0.78	1.26	NY 383	Union Street in Wheatland	CR 139	
CR 170 (2)	4.86	7.82	CR 139 in Wheatland	Union Street	NY 33A / NY 259 in Chili	
CR 171			CR 250	Chambers Street in Ogden	NY 259	Former number
CR 172	2.83	4.55	NY 386	Stottle Road in Chili	NY 33A	
CR 173	7.09	11.41	NY 19 in Sweden	Colby Street	NY 259 in Ogden	
CR 174	4.96	7.98	Livingston County line in Wheatland (becomes CR 63)	Wheatland Center Road	CR 133 in Chili	
CR 175	3.90	6.28	CR 244 in Ogden	Canal Road	NY 259 / CR 113 in Spencerport	
CR 176 (1)	1.82	2.93	CR 141 in Wheatland	Bowerman Road	NY 383 in Scottsville	
CR 176 (2)	0.02	0.03	CR 141	Bowerman Road Spur	CR 176 (1)	
CR 177	1.52	2.45	NY 259 in Spencerport	Lyell Avenue and Spencerport Road	CR 210 in Ogden	
CR 178	0.18	0.29	CR 145	Twin Bridge Road in Wheatland	NY 383	
CR 179 (1)	1.01	1.63	CR 244	Ogden–Parma Town Line Road	CR 212/CR 214	
CR 179 (2)	3.50	5.63	CR 216	Ogden–Parma Town Line Road	CR 208	
CR 180	2.73	4.39	NY 36	Mumford Road in Wheatland	CR 184 at Riga town line	
CR 181	1.48	2.38	CR 214	Pine Hill Road in Parma	CR 216	
CR 182	2.22	3.57	CR 166 at Wheatland town line	Malloch Road in Riga	NY 33A	
CR 183	5.12	8.24	CR 254	Peck Road in Parma	NY 261	
CR 184	3.35	5.39	CR 180 at Wheatland town line	Palmer Road in Riga	CR 157	
CR 185	2.79	4.49	CR 219 / CR 254	Parma Center Road in Parma	NY 18 / NY 259	
CR 186	1.56	2.51	NY 383	Belcoda Road in Wheatland	CR 188	
CR 187	4.48	7.21	CR 254	Burritt Road in Parma	NY 261	
CR 188	0.96	1.54	CR 186	Winslow Road in Wheatland	CR 151 at Riga town line	
CR 189	0.12	0.19	CR 228	West Avenue in Parma	NY 18	
CR 190	0.64	1.03	CR 151 at Riga town line	Chili–Riga Town Line Road	CR 133 / CR 155	
CR 191	0.80	1.29	NY 18 / NY 259 in Hilton	East Avenue	CR 193 / CR 220 in Parma	
CR 192	1.28	2.06	CR 155	Betteridge Road in Riga	NY 33A	
CR 193	1.50	2.41	CR 191 / CR 220	Wilder Road in Parma	NY 261 / CR 107	
CR 194	4.46	7.18	NY 33A / CR 184 in Riga	Attridge Road	NY 33 in Chili	
CR 195	3.74	6.02	CR 203 / CR 228	Curtis Road in Parma	NY 261	
CR 196 (1)	0.67	1.08	CR 149	Brew Road in Riga	Landfill Gate	
CR 196 (2)	0.73	1.17	Landfill Gate	Brew Road in Riga	NY 33A	
CR 197	3.43	5.52	CR 228	Moul Road in Parma	CR 224	
CR 198	1.21	1.95	CR 119	Coldwater Road in Gates	NY 33	Entire length overlaps with NY 386; assigned on November 26, 2007
CR 199	2.44	3.93	CR 228	Huffer Road in Parma	Dead end at Lake Ontario	
CR 200	0.53	0.85	NY 33	Park Road in Churchville	CR 268	

== Routes 201–250 ==
Route	Length (mi)	Length (km)	From	Via	To	Notes
CR 201			NY 260 / CR 230	Chase Road	CR 228	Former number
CR 202	1.16	1.87	CR 268 at Churchville village line in Riga	Bangs Road	CR 167 in Ogden	
CR 203	7.19	11.57	CR 236	Brick Schoolhouse Road in Hamlin	CR 195 / CR 228	
CR 204	1.28	2.06	CR 163 in Riga	Mcintosh Road	CR 167 in Ogden	
CR 205	1.66	2.67	NY 260	Walker Road in Hamlin	CR 228	
CR 206	3.85	6.20	CR 167	Hubbell Street in Ogden	NY 31	
CR 207	2.66	4.28	NY 18	Hamlin Center Road in Hamlin	NY 260	Former routing of NY 18, 1930-1931
CR 208	5.42	8.72	NY 33 in Gates	Manitou Road	NY 104 / NY 261 in Greece	
CR 209	5.91	9.51	CR 234	North Hamlin Road in Hamlin	CR 228	
CR 210	3.14	5.05	CR 273	Gillett Road in Ogden	CR 179	
CR 211	4.90	7.89	NY 272	Moscow Road in Hamlin	NY 19	
CR 212	1.23	1.98	NY 31 / NY 36	Washington Road in Ogden	CR 179 / CR 214	
CR 213	2.29	3.69	CR 252	Clarkson–Hamlin Town Line Road	NY 18	
CR 214	1.23	1.98	CR 179 / CR 212	Hinkleyville Road in Parma	NY 104	
CR 215	4.21	6.78	NY 19	Lawrence Road in Clarkson	CR 254	
CR 216	1.05	1.69	CR 179	Trimmer Road in Parma	NY 104	
CR 217	2.26	3.64	NY 19	Lawton Road in Clarkson	NY 260	
CR 218	1.75	2.82	NY 104	Dean Road in Parma	CR 183	
CR 219	1.60	2.57	NY 260	Ireland Road in Clarkson	CR 185 / CR 254	
CR 220	2.81	4.52	CR 191 / CR 193	Bennett Road in Parma	CR 199	
CR 221	2.26	3.64	NY 19 / CR 281 in Brockport	East Avenue	NY 260 in Clarkson	
CR 222	2.05	3.30	CR 195	Lighthouse Road in Parma	Dead end at Lake Ontario	
CR 223	1.19	1.92	NY 260	Gordon Road in Sweden	CR 244	
CR 224	1.54	2.48	NY 261	Payne Beach Road in Greece	Dead end at Lake Ontario	
CR 225	2.08	3.35	NY 19	Shumway Road in Sweden	CR 242	
CR 226			CR 195	North Avenue	Dead end at Lake Ontario	Part south of Lake Ontario State Parkway overlapped with NY 259; NY 259 section transferred to state on November 26, 2007; remainder given to town
CR 227	2.13	3.43	CR 240	White Road in Sweden	NY 19	
CR 228	4.15	6.68	CR 254 / CR 274	Hamlin–Parma Town Line Road	Dead end at Lake Ontario	
CR 229	0.52	0.84	CR 242	Swamp Road in Sweden	CR 246	
CR 230			NY 18	Walker–Lake Ontario Road in Hamlin	Dead end at Lake Ontario	Part south of Lake Ontario State Parkway overlapped with NY 260; NY 260 section transferred to state on November 26, 2007; remainder given to town
CR 231	2.48	3.99	NY 19	Beadle Road in Sweden	CR 250	
CR 232			CR 209	Lake Road East Fork in Hamlin	Lake Ontario State Parkway	Entire length overlapped with NY 19; transferred to state on November 26, 2007
CR 233	1.25	2.01	CR 240	Capen Road in Sweden	CR 236	
CR 234	3.04	4.89	NY 19	Lake Road West Fork in Hamlin	CR 211	Overlapped with NY 360 south of CR 277 from 2007 to 2012
CR 235	3.47	5.58	Genesee County line (becomes CR 14)	Reed Road in Sweden	CR 167 at Ogden town line	
CR 236 (1)	2.75	4.43	CR 233	Redman Road in Sweden	NY 31/NY 31A/NY 19 Truck	
CR 236 (2)	9.68	15.58	NY 31/NY 19 Truck/CR 281 at Clarkson-Sweden town line	Redman Road	Cook Road in Hamlin	Overlapped with NY 360 between CR 277 and CR 279 from 2007 to 2012; part north of CR 279 was formerly NY 941P
CR 237	1.92	3.09	CR 160	Hinchey Road in Gates	NY 33A	
CR 238	1.10	1.77	NY 31	Monroe–Orleans County Line Road in Clarkson	Orleans County line (becomes CR 63)	
CR 239	2.84	4.57	Rochester city line	Westfall Road in Brighton	NY 31 / CR 60	
CR 240	4.50	7.24	Genesee County line (becomes CR 6)	West Sweden Road in Sweden	NY 31A	
CR 241	3.11	5.01	Rochester city line	East Ridge Road in Irondequoit	NY 590 exit 11	Formerly part of US 104 and NY 18
CR 242	1.78	2.86	CR 229	Sweden–Walker Road in Sweden	NY 31 / NY 260	
CR 243	0.95	1.53	NY 65	East Street in Honeoye Falls	CR 53 at Honeoye Falls village line	
CR 244	0.42	0.68	CR 175 in Sweden	Gallup Road	CR 223 in Ogden	
CR 245	2.20	3.54	Ontario County line (becomes CR 17)	Oatka Creek Road in Wheatland	NY 36	
CR 246 (1)	1.45	2.33	CR 231	Salmon Creek Road in Sweden	CR 173	
CR 246 (2)	0.91	1.46	CR 173	Salmon Creek Road in Sweden	NY 31	
CR 247	1.58	2.54	NY 259	Ogden Center Road in Ogden	CR 210	
CR 248	1.76	2.83	CR 235	Root Road in Sweden	CR 231	
CR 249	0.62	1.00	CR 150 / CR 267	Dorsey Road in Greece	NY 18 / CR 132	
CR 250	0.32	0.51	CR 231	Ogden–Sweden Town Line Road	Chambers Street	

== Routes 251 and up ==
Route	Length (mi)	Length (km)	From	Via	To	Notes
CR 251	2.81	4.52	NY 261	Mill Road in Greece	CR 136 / CR 267	
CR 252	0.75	1.21	CR 213	Drake Road in Hamlin	NY 18	
CR 253	0.56	0.90	CR 64	Barker Road in Pittsford	CR 66	
CR 254	4.44	7.15	NY 104	Clarkson–Parma Town Line Road	CR 228 / CR 274	
CR 255			Lake Avenue / Lake Ontario State Parkway	Pattonwood Drive in Rochester	Irondequoit town line	Former number; road transferred to state on November 26, 2007
CR 256	1.23	1.98	NY 33A / NY 252A / CR 168	Chili Center–Coldwater Road in Chili	CR 119	Entire length overlaps with NY 386; assigned on November 26, 2007
CR 257	0.20	0.32	CR 97 / CR 120	Durand Boulevard in Irondequoit	Sea Breeze Drive	
CR 258	0.54	0.87	CR 159 at Churchville village line	Baker Street in Churchville	NY 33 / NY 36	
CR 259	0.79	1.27	Rochester city line	Seneca Avenue in Irondequoit	CR 91	
CR 260	0.68	1.09	CR 13	Jackson Road Extension in Penfield	CR 20	
CR 261	0.52	0.84	CR 136	Mitchell Road in Greece	CR 136	
CR 262	0.99	1.59	NY 18	Kirk Road in Greece	Janes Road	
CR 263	1.37	2.20	CR 39	Hylan Drive in Henrietta	NY 252	
CR 264	2.20	3.54	NY 104 / CR 152	Fetzner Road in Greece	CR 109	
CR 265	0.50	0.80	CR 147	George Street in Wheatland	NY 36 / CR 145	
CR 266	2.77	4.46	CR 79	John Street in Henrietta	NY 252 / CR 85	
CR 267	1.90	3.06	CR 136 / CR 251	Vintage Lane in Greece	CR 150 / CR 249	
CR 268	0.88	1.42	NY 33 / NY 36	North Main Street in Churchville	CR 202 at Churchville village line	
CR 269	2.46	3.96	NY 96 in Brighton	Penfield Road	CR 270 in Penfield	Former routing of NY 441
CR 270	0.40	0.64	NY 153 / NY 441	Panorama Trail in Penfield	CR 269	Part south of Irondequoit Creek was formerly NY 942B
CR 271	1.95	3.14	NY 31	Clover Street in Brighton	NY 96	Entire length overlaps with NY 65
CR 272	0.69	1.11	Lake Ontario State Parkway	Manitou Beach Road in Greece	Braddocks Avenue	Entire length overlaps with NY 261
CR 273	1.05	1.69	CR 210	Shepard Road in Ogden	CR 208	
CR 274	0.12	0.19	NY 18	Roosevelt Highway Extension in Hamlin	CR 228 / CR 254	
CR 275			CR 177 at Spencerport village line	Spencerport Road in Ogden	CR 210	Former number; now part of CR 177
CR 277	1.89	3.04	CR 236	Church Road in Hamlin	CR 234	Assigned on November 26, 2007; overlapped with NY 360 from 2007 to 2012
CR 279	1.51	2.43	NY 272	Morton Road in Hamlin	CR 236	Assigned on November 26, 2007; overlapped with NY 360 from 2007 to 2012
CR 281	1.52	2.45	NY 31 / CR 236	West Avenue in Clarkson	NY 19	Former routing of NY 31; assigned on November 26, 2007
CR 900	0.24	0.39	CR 118	Horseshoe Road in Rochester	CR 97	
CR 901	0.24	0.39	CR 902	South Glen Road in Irondequoit	Glen Haven Road	
CR 902	0.52	0.84	Orchard Park Boulevard	Bay Front South in Irondequoit	CR 901	
CR 903	0.18	0.29	Corwin Road	Park Road in Brighton	Landing Road North	
CR 904	0.54	0.87	CR 29	Corduroy Road in Perinton	CR 25	
CR 905	1.09	1.75	NY 65 in Pittsford	Hopkins Point Road in Pittsford and Mendon	CR 31 in Pittsford	

== See also ==
- County routes in New York
- List of reference routes in New York
