= Lake Ontario State Parkway =

Highway in New York

Lake Ontario State Parkway
- Lake Ontario State Parkway highlighted in red and NY 948A in blue

Route information
- Maintained by NYSDOT
- Length: 35.05 mi (56.41 km)
- Existed: early 1950s–present
- Tourist routes: Great Lakes Seaway Trail
- Restrictions: No commercial vehicles; closed west of NY 98 from December to March

Major junctions
- West end: NY 948A in Carlton
- NY 98 in Carlton; NY 19 in Hamlin; NY 390 in Greece
- East end: Lake Avenue / Pattonwood Drive in Rochester

Location
- Country: United States
- State: New York
- Counties: Orleans, Monroe

Highway system
- New York Highways; Interstate; US; State; Reference; Parkways

The Lake Ontario State Parkway is a 35.05-mile (56.41 km) limited-access parkway along the southern shore of Lake Ontario in Western New York in the United States. The western end of the highway is at a partial interchange within Lakeside Beach State Park in Carlton, Orleans County. Its eastern terminus is at an intersection with Lake Avenue in the Charlotte neighborhood of the Monroe County city of Rochester. The parkway is internally designated by the New York State Department of Transportation (NYSDOT) as New York State Route 947A (NY 947A), an unsigned reference route. A short, 0.55-mile (0.89 km) connector between the west end of the parkway and NY 18 is unsigned New York State Route 948A.

The parkway mainline and the connector to NY 18 are both part of the Seaway Trail, a National Scenic Byway that extends along the shores of Lake Erie and Lake Ontario from northwestern Pennsylvania to the North Country area of New York. The Lake Ontario State Parkway passes through mostly open and rural areas, except near Greece and Rochester, where the land surrounding the highway is more developed. It serves mostly as a connector between Rochester and several lakeside state parks and communities. From its western terminus to the Rochester suburbs, the parkway is the closest continuous roadway to the Lake Ontario shore.

The highway was one of several parkways built as part of a 145-mile (233 km) expansion to the state's parkway system in 1944. Construction of the Lake Ontario State Parkway began in the late 1940s, and the first section of the route—linking Hamlin Beach State Park to NY 261—opened in the early 1950s. The remainder of the highway through Greece and Rochester was built in stages during the 1950s and early 1960s, while the section between Lakeside Beach and Hamlin Beach State Parks was constructed in the early 1970s. The original plans for the highway called for it to extend as far west as Niagara Falls; later proposals moved the terminus to the north end of the Robert Moses State Parkway near Fort Niagara.

The parkway has been underfunded for years by the state. At the beginning of its life, it was planned to go from Rochester to Niagara Falls. In 2017, the western half of the parkway was finally gifted $9 million, to begin project to repave the sections of Route 19 in Hamlin to Payne Beach (approximately 8 miles). In 2018, $5.2 million was given by the State Of New York. This project paved 7 miles, east and westbound lanes, west of Route 19 (Hamlin) and Route 237 (Kendall). The paving project began in April 2018 and finished in the fall of the same year. During these projects, shoulders were narrowed from 12 to 8 feet. Still, in 2019, about 12 miles of the parkway are in poor condition; consequently, it sees barely any traffic and is not driveable in the winter. The NYSDOT considered permanently closing the deteriorated part of the parkway, which saw only a few hundred cars a day, but the parkway remained open.

== Route description ==
An aerial view of the western end of the parkway and Oak Orchard Creek

The entirety of the 35.05-mile (56.41 km) Lake Ontario State Parkway mainline is designated as NY 947A, while the 0.55-mile (0.89 km) connector between the parkway and NY 18 in Lakeside Beach State Park—named Lakeside Beach Road—is designated as NY 948A. Both are reference route designations and are thus unsigned. The New York State Office of Parks, Recreation and Historic Preservation has jurisdiction over both NY 947A and NY 948A; however, NYSDOT maintains both highways.

=== Orleans County and Hamlin Beach ===
The Lake Ontario State Parkway begins at an interchange with Lakeside Beach Road in Lakeside Beach State Park, located within the town of Carlton in north-central Orleans County. It heads eastward as a four-lane freeway as part of the Seaway Trail, which enters the area from the west on NY 18 and turns north onto Lakeside Beach Road to access the parkway. The four-lane parkway exits the park and enters an area dominated by open, cultivated fields, where it skirts the southern edge of Oak Orchard State Marine Park, a small park situated at the mouth of the Oak Orchard River. Not far to the east, the parkway crosses the river itself and connects to the northern terminus of NY 98 by way of an interchange.

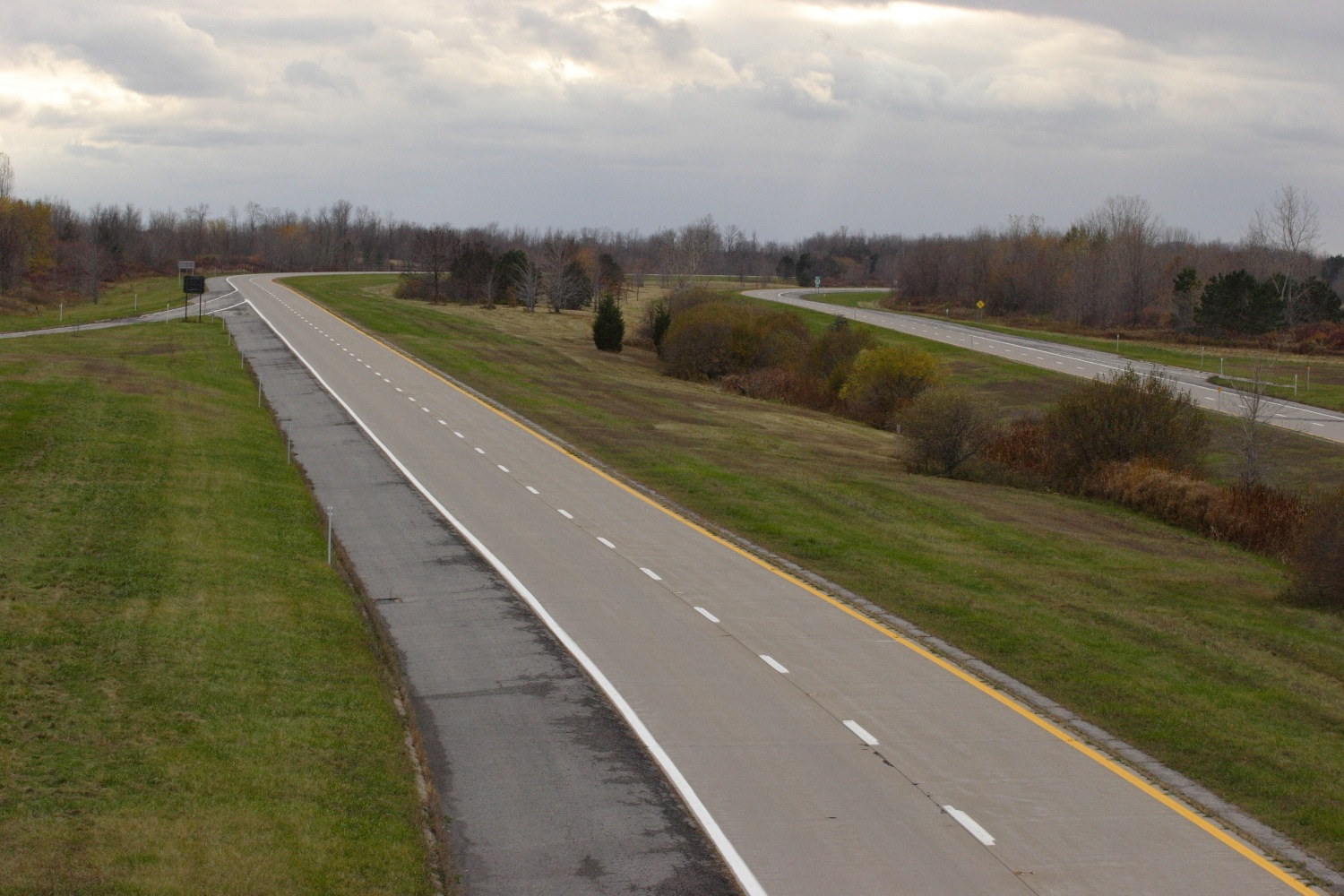
Lake Ontario State Parkway west of Kendall

East of NY 98, the parkway makes a turn to the northeast, meeting Lake Shore Road at a diamond interchange just south of the southern shoreline of Lake Ontario. The highway continues to the shoreline itself, at which point it turns eastward to run along the lake shore for most of the next 6 miles (10 km). While on the lake shore, the parkway crosses into Kendall, the northeasternmost town in the county. It begins to move southward from the lake at an interchange with NY 237, and for the next 2 miles (3.2 km) it follows a more inland path through another set of open fields. The more southerly alignment takes the route south of the lakeside hamlet of Troutburg, located at the north end of NY 272, which runs along the Orleans–Monroe county line. The parkway crosses into Monroe County upon connecting to NY 272 at an interchange 0.3 miles (0.5 km) from the lake shore.

Now in the town of Hamlin, the parkway heads southeastward along the southern edge of Hamlin Beach State Park. Roughly midway through the park, it connects to the park itself by way of a large, modified trumpet interchange that also connects Moscow Road—an east–west connector between Redman Road (former NY 215) and NY 19—to the parkway and Hamlin Beach State Park. East of the park, the parkway comes close to the lake shore once again; however, most of the route in Hamlin is separated from the lake by a series of linear, lakeside hamlets. Roughly 2.5 miles (4.0 km) east of Hamlin Beach, the highway becomes a four-lane expressway ahead of a four-way intersection with NY 19.

=== Hamlin to Rochester ===
Past NY 19, the parkway crosses over Sandy Creek and heads into a portion of Hamlin with less open fields and more forested areas. It has intersections with three more roads—including NY 260—before passing into Parma at a junction with Hamlin–Parma Town Line Road. Junctions with NY 259 and two more local roads come next, followed by the last of the eight at-grade intersections: Payne Beach Road on the Parma–Greece town line. In Greece, the parkway takes a more southeasterly routing, matching the curvature of Lake Ontario's shoreline. About 1.5 miles (2.4 km) into Greece, the parkway becomes a four-lane freeway ahead of an interchange with NY 261. At this point, the trees that had surrounded the parkway begin to dwindle in number, once again opening up views of the lake.

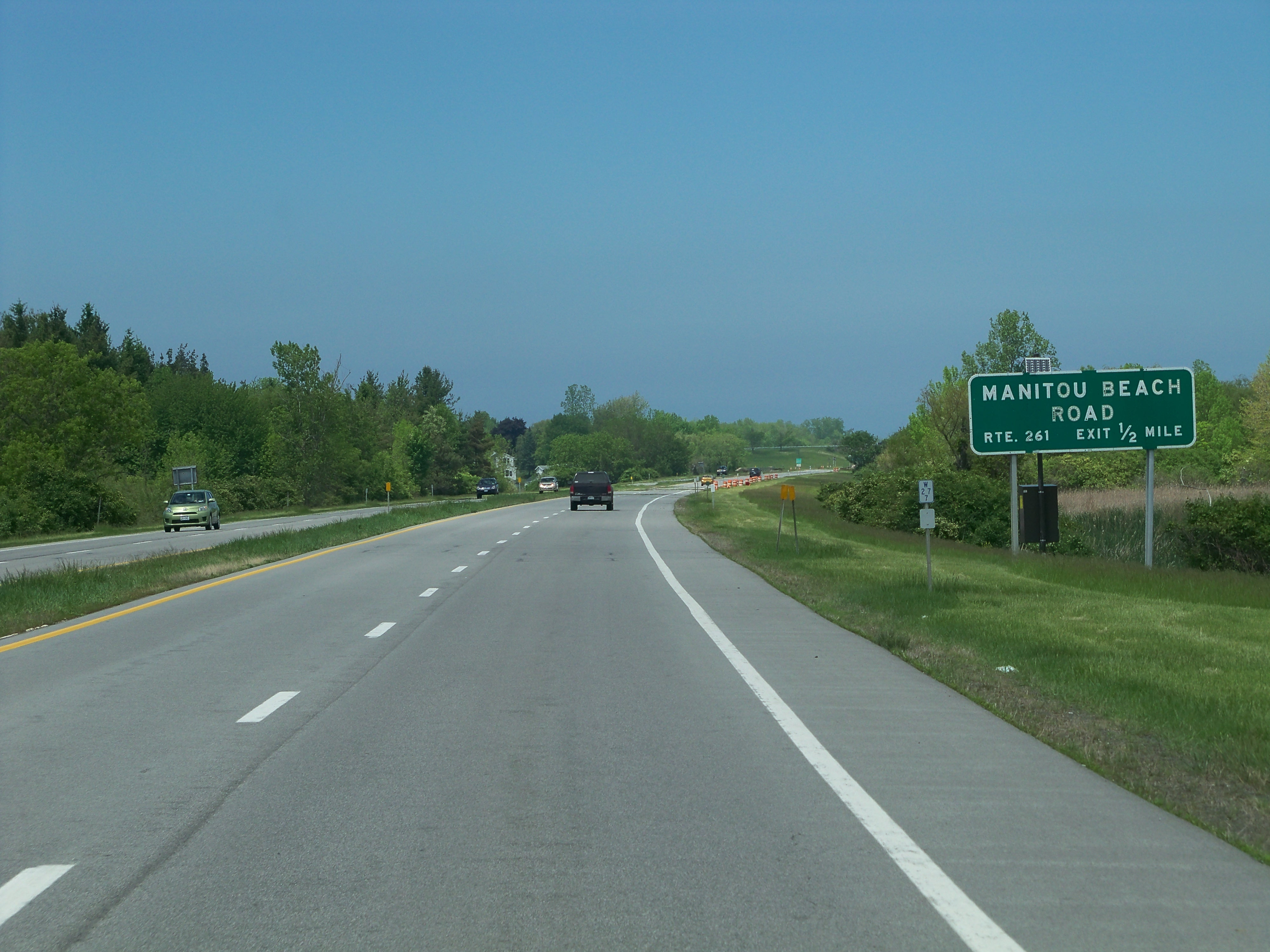
Old, text-only sign for NY 261's exit on the Lake Ontario Parkway

At NY 261, the parkway briefly turns southward, crossing over Salmon Creek and passing west of Braddock Bay before resuming a southeasterly alignment at the East Manitou Road interchange. Here, the Lake Ontario Parkway connects to Braddock Bay State Park, located just northeast of the exit. The parkway leaves the lake for good after the East Manitou Road junction, staying roughly 1 mile (1.6 km) from the lake shore for the remainder of its routing. As it proceeds onward, it runs along the southwestern side of Long Pond and subsequently meets Long Pond Road. Here, the surroundings of the parkway begin to change, becoming more developed as homes gradually overtake the forests and fields that had surrounded the parkway since Carlton.

The parkway winds its way southeastward, passing by homes to the south and marshlands surrounding Beatty Point to the north. At the eastern edge of the marsh, the Lake Ontario Parkway meets the northern end of the controlled-access NY 390. From here eastward, the parkway travels through highly populated areas of the town, meeting Dewey Avenue, Greenleaf Road, and Latta Road and passing under the Hojack Line. East of Latta Road, it passes into the city of Rochester and its Charlotte neighborhood, where it terminates just 0.25 miles (0.40 km) later at an intersection with Lake Avenue. The right-of-way of the parkway and the Seaway Trail both continue eastward as Pattonwood Drive, which leads to the Colonel Patrick O'Rorke Memorial Bridge a short distance to the east. Two blocks north of the junction is the National Register of Historic Places-listed Charlotte–Genesee Lighthouse, located off Lake Avenue.

== History ==
=== Background and initial financing ===
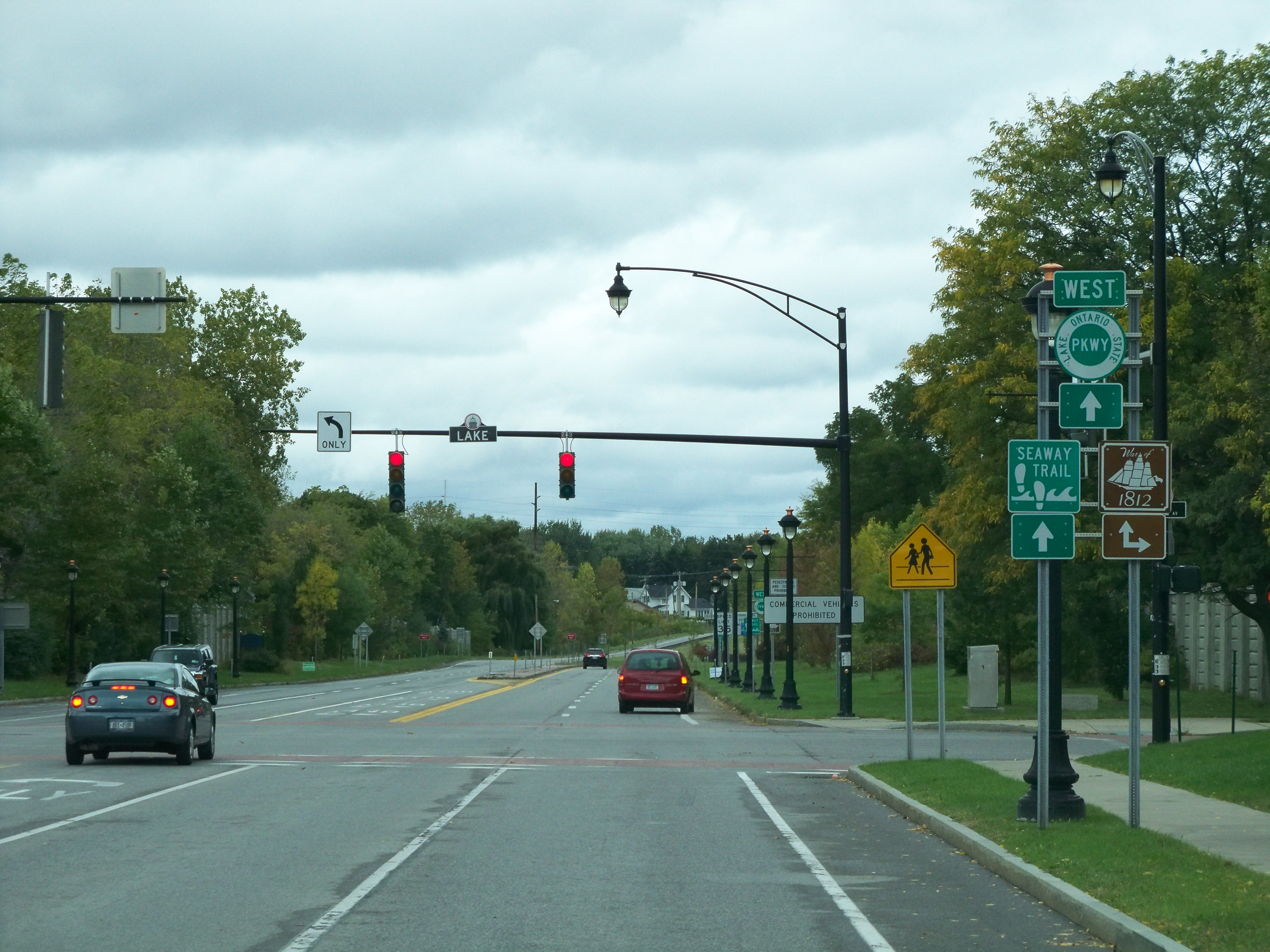
Eastern terminus of the parkway at Lake Avenue in Rochester

Prior to the construction of the Lake Ontario State Parkway, there were no highways that ran along the Lake Ontario shoreline in eastern Orleans County or western Monroe County. At the time, the northernmost continuous east–west highway in these areas was NY 18; however, it deviated significantly from the lakeshore east of Carlton and followed a more inland route to Rochester. Between Carlton and Rochester, the lake shore was accessible only by way of north–south highways off NY 18 or by local east–west roads.

Plans were made as early as 1941 to construct the Lake Ontario State Parkway. On January 13, 1941, New York State Council of Parks chairman Robert Moses indirectly sponsored a bill in the New York State Legislature that would set aside $30 million (equivalent to $657 million in 2025) for the construction of several parkways across New York. One of the parkways that would receive funding from the measure was the proposed Lake Ontario State Parkway, which would receive $4.6 million (equivalent to $101 million in 2025) toward its construction. The bill was approved by both houses of the legislature and given to Governor Herbert H. Lehman, who signed it on March 28, 1941. However, its ultimate approval was dependent on the passage of a constitutional amendment that would allow the legislature to use $60 million (equivalent to $1.31 billion in 2025) intended for eliminating grade crossings for the construction of highways instead. The $30 million earmarked for parkway construction was part of the $60 million in question. On November 4, 1941, the amendment was approved in a statewide referendum on the issue, allowing for the money to be transferred.

=== Construction and extensions ===
On August 17, 1944, Moses announced a 145-mile (233 km) expansion of the existing system of parkways in New York that was intended to accommodate an increase in vehicular traffic that came about following World War II. One of the highways to be built as part of the expansion was the Lake Ontario State Parkway. The first section of the parkway to be built was the piece from Hamlin Beach State Park to NY 261 at Manitou Beach. Construction on the segment began in the late 1940s and was completed in the early 1950s. At some point between 1952 and 1954, work began on an extension eastward to Dewey Avenue in Greece. By 1956, the parkway was open to East Manitou Road and under construction to Lake Avenue in Charlotte. The portion of the highway from East Manitou Road to Long Pond Road was opened by 1958, and the section from Long Pond Road to Dewey Avenue was opened to traffic on October 14, 1958, following a ribbon-cutting ceremony attended by Governor W. Averell Harriman and State Council of Parks chairman Robert Moses. The segment between Dewey and Lake avenues opened to traffic c. 1962.

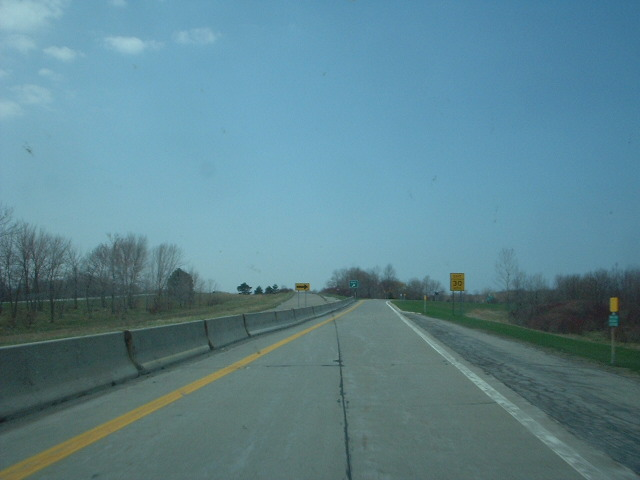
A stub at the parkway's west end, a remnant of the original plans to extend the highway farther west. This stub is located at Lakeside Beach State Park, in Waterport

Long-term plans for the parkway called for it to extend westward along the entirety of the Lake Ontario shoreline to Niagara Falls, and from there as far southward as Buffalo. By 1960, the proposed routing was adjusted to meet the northern end of the Robert Moses State Parkway in Porter, near Fort Niagara. When the city of Niagara Falls released its Regional Highway Plan for the Buffalo–Niagara Falls area in 1971, the proposed routing of the Lake Ontario State Parkway was unchanged. Despite the widespread intentions of extending the parkway westward to Niagara County, the highway never extended any farther westward than Lakeside Beach State Park. The lone portion of the extension that was built—between Hamlin Beach and Lakeside Beach state parks—was constructed between 1969 and December 1972 and officially opened on February 16, 1973.

=== Seasonal closure ===
The 5-mile (8.0 km) section of the parkway between Lakeside Beach State Park and Lake Shore Road handles an average of just under 1,200 vehicles per day, making it the least-traveled section of the highway. Furthermore, the 2-mile (3.2 km) piece west of NY 98 serves an average of 800 vehicles during the summer months and a fraction of that number during the winter months. On November 21, 2012, NYSDOT announced plans to close the parkway between Lakeside Beach State Park and NY 98 during the winter months, citing the low wintertime traffic volumes along the road. The move was predicted to save roughly $70,000 annually in costs related to plowing and salting. The practice has continued to the present. A detour is posted along NY 18, which parallels the parkway for most of its length.

== Exit list ==
All exits are unnumbered.

County	Location	mi	km	Destinations	Notes
Orleans	Carlton	0.00	0.00	To NY 18 – Lakeside Beach State Park, Niagara Falls	Western terminus; at-grade intersection; access via NY 948A
Orleans	Carlton	2.24	3.60	NY 98 south – Albion, Point Breeze	Northern terminus of NY 98; western terminus during seasonal closure from December to March
Orleans	Carlton	4.82	7.76	Lake Shore Road	
Orleans	Kendall	10.36	16.67	NY 237 south – Kendall, Holley	Northern terminus of NY 237
Orleans	Kendall	12.47	20.07	NY 272 south – Morton	Northern terminus of NY 272
Monroe	Hamlin	15.15	24.38	Hamlin Beach State Park	
Monroe	Hamlin			Eastern end of freeway section	
Monroe	Hamlin	17.61	28.34	NY 19 south (Lake Road East Fork) – Hamlin, Brockport	At-grade intersection; northern terminus of NY 19
Monroe	Hamlin	19.84	31.93	NY 260 south (Walker–Lake Ontario Road)	At-grade intersection; northern terminus of NY 260
Monroe	Parma	23.20	37.34	NY 259 south (North Avenue) – Hilton	At-grade intersection; northern terminus of NY 259
Monroe	Parma			Western end of freeway section	
Monroe	Town of Greece	26.93	43.34	NY 261 (Manitou Beach Road)	
Monroe	Town of Greece	28.47	45.82	East Manitou Road (CR 140) – Braddock Bay Park	
Monroe	Town of Greece	30.12	48.47	Long Pond Road	
Monroe	Town of Greece	32.20	51.82	NY 390 south	Northern terminus and exits 27A-B on NY 390
Monroe	Town of Greece	33.21	53.45	Dewey Avenue (CR 132) to NY 18	
Monroe	Town of Greece	34.25	55.12	Greenleaf Road	
Monroe	Town of Greece	34.65	55.76	Latta Road	No eastbound exit
Monroe	Rochester	35.05	56.41	Lake Avenue / Pattonwood Drive	Eastern terminus; at-grade intersection
1.000 mi = 1.609 km; 1.000 km = 0.621 mi: Incomplete access

=== NY 948A ===
The entire route is in Carlton, Orleans County.

mi	km	Destinations	Notes
0.00	0.00	NY 18	Southern terminus
0.23	0.37	Lake Ontario State Parkway east	Western terminus of Lake Ontario State Parkway
0.55	0.89	Park access road	Northern end of state maintenance
1.000 mi = 1.609 km; 1.000 km = 0.621 mi

== See also ==
- Lake Ontario
- Parkways in New York
