= New York State Route 260 =

State highway in Monroe County, New York, US

New York State Route 260
- Map of the Rochester area with NY 260 highlighted in red

Route information
- Maintained by NYSDOT
- Length: 10.58 mi (17.03 km)
- Existed: 1930–present

Major junctions
- South end: NY 31 in Sweden
- North end: Lake Ontario State Parkway in Hamlin

Location
- Country: United States
- State: New York
- Counties: Monroe

Highway system
- New York Highways; Interstate; US; State; Reference; Parkways
← NY 259	→ NY 261

New York State Route 260 (NY 260) is a north–south state highway in Monroe County, New York, in the United States. The southern terminus of the route is at an intersection with NY 31 in the town of Sweden. Its northern terminus is at a junction with the Lake Ontario State Parkway in the town of Hamlin near the Lake Ontario shoreline. NY 260 crosses the Erie Canal near Brockport and intersects NY 104 and NY 18 in Clarkson. Much of NY 260 is a two-lane highway that passes through rural portions of western Monroe County.

The portion of NY 260 south of NY 18 was assigned as part of the 1930 renumbering of state highways in New York. NY 260 was extended north to North Hamlin Road c. 1931 and to the Lake Ontario State Parkway in the early 1960s. All of NY 260 north of NY 18 was originally maintained by Monroe County as the unsigned County Route 230 (CR 230); however, ownership and maintenance of CR 230 south of the Lake Ontario State Parkway was transferred from Monroe County to the state of New York in 2007 as part of a highway maintenance swap between the two levels of government.

== Route description ==
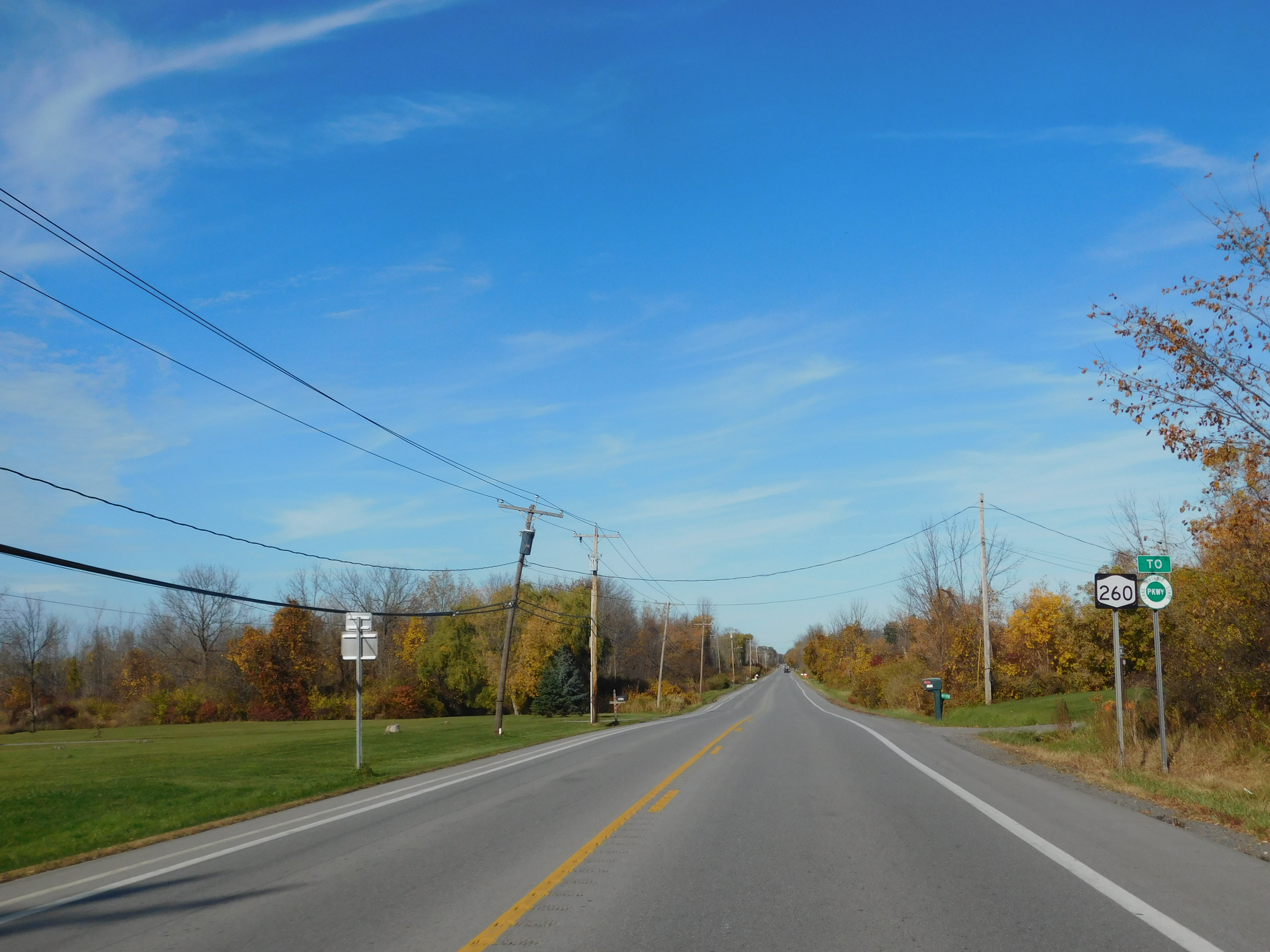
NY 260 north from NY 104 in Clarkson

Heading north from NY 31, NY 260, named Sweden–Walker Road for the two communities it connects, proceeds to the north-northeast as a two-lane highway through a lightly developed area of the town of Sweden, crossing both the former right-of-way of an old Conrail line known as the Falls Road Secondary and the Erie Canal before entering the town of Clarkson. Across the town line, the surroundings become slightly more rural as the route approaches a junction with NY 104 (West Ridge Road) in the hamlet of Garland, located northeast of the village of Brockport and east of the hamlet of Clarkson Corners. Continuing on its north-northeasterly path, NY 260 passes through areas of increasingly rural nature as it progresses through northern Clarkson.

At the northern town line, NY 260 intersects NY 18, which runs along the boundary between the towns of Clarkson and Hamlin at this point. NY 260 becomes Walker–Lake Ontario Road and takes on a more northerly alignment upon crossing into Hamlin. About one mile (1.6 km) into Hamlin, the route serves the small hamlet of Walker. Outside of Walker, NY 260 traverses large areas of farmland as it continues toward and eventually ends at the Lake Ontario State Parkway. While NY 260 terminates at the intersection with the parkway, the road itself continues north for an additional 0.25 miles (0.40 km) to the hamlet of Shore Acres on the Lake Ontario shoreline, where it ends at a dead end.

== History ==
NY 260 was assigned as part of the 1930 renumbering of state highways in New York to the portion of its modern alignment between NY 31 in Sweden and NY 18 in Hamlin. At the time, NY 18 was routed on Hamlin Center Road and used part of modern NY 260 to reach the Clarkson–Hamlin town line. By the following year, NY 18 was rerouted to follow Clarkson–Hamlin Town Line Road (Roosevelt Highway) while NY 260 was extended northward through Walker to North Hamlin Road, then the last east–west roadway before Lake Ontario.

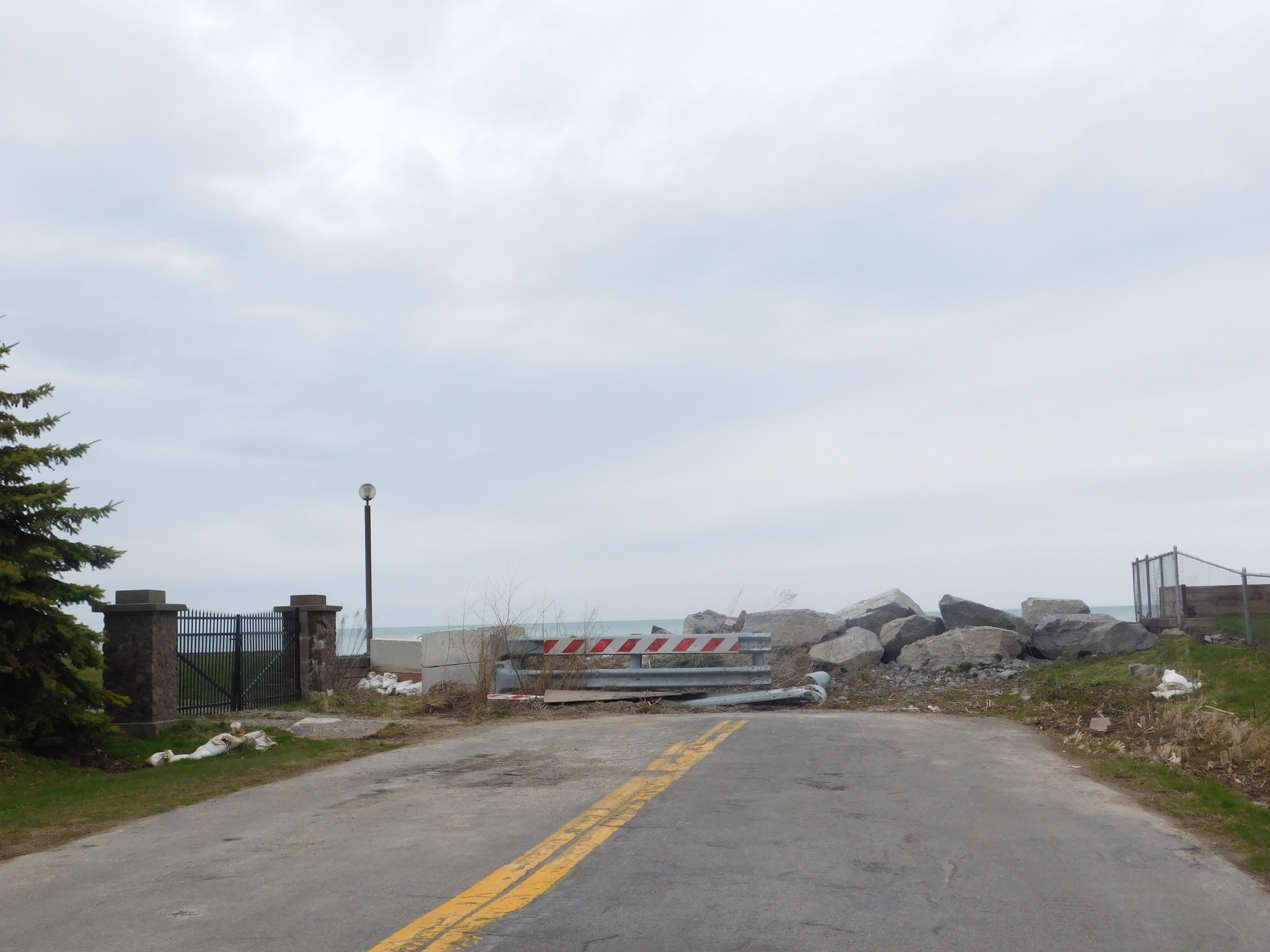
NY 260's former alignment at Lake Ontario

NY 260 was extended a second time c. 1962 to intersect the Lake Ontario State Parkway near the lakeshore. This extension, as well as the piece of NY 260 added c. 1931, was initially maintained by Monroe County as the unsigned CR 230, a route that continued north of the parkway to the lake along Walker–Lake Ontario Road. In 2007, ownership and maintenance of CR 230 south of the Lake Ontario State Parkway was transferred from Monroe County to the state of New York as part of a highway maintenance swap between the two levels of government. A bill (S4856, 2007) to enact the swap was introduced in the New York State Senate on April 23 and passed by both the Senate and the New York State Assembly on June 20. The act was signed into law by Governor Eliot Spitzer on August 28. Under the terms of the act, it took effect 90 days after it was signed into law; thus, the maintenance swap officially took place on November 26, 2007. The entirety of NY 260 is now state-maintained. CR 230, meanwhile, no longer exists in any form as the remainder of the route north to the lakeshore was transferred to the town of Hamlin by March 2009.

== Major intersections ==
The entire route is in Monroe County.

Location	mi	km	Destinations	Notes
Sweden	0.00	0.00	NY 31	Southern terminus
Clarkson	1.95	3.14	NY 104 (West Ridge Road)	Hamlet of Garland
Clarkson–Hamlin town line	6.19	9.96	NY 18	
Hamlin	10.58	17.03	Lake Ontario State Parkway	Northern terminus
1.000 mi = 1.609 km; 1.000 km = 0.621 mi

== See also ==
- List of county routes in Monroe County, New York
