= New York State Route 261 =

State highway in Monroe County, New York, US

New York State Route 261
- Map of the Rochester area with NY 261 highlighted in red

Route information
- Maintained by NYSDOT and Monroe County
- Length: 7.70 mi (12.39 km)
- Existed: c. 1931–present

Major junctions
- South end: NY 104 on Greece–Parma town line
- North end: Lake Ontario State Parkway in Greece

Location
- Country: United States
- State: New York
- Counties: Monroe

Highway system
- New York Highways; Interstate; US; State; Reference; Parkways
← NY 260	→ NY 262

New York State Route 261 (NY 261) is a north–south state highway located west of the city of Rochester in Monroe County, New York, in the United States. It extends for 7.70 miles (12.39 km) through mostly rural areas from an intersection with NY 104 on the Greece–Parma town line to a dead end at the Lake Ontario shoreline in Greece. The majority of NY 261 is situated on the boundary between the towns of Greece and Parma; however, the last 2 miles (3.2 km) of the route are located solely in Greece. NY 261 meets the Lake Ontario State Parkway southwest of Manitou Beach on the latter stretch.

The origins of NY 261 date back to the mid-1910s when the highway was initially taken over by the state. It went unnumbered—in terms of having a posted designation—until c. 1931, at which time it became NY 261. The portion of NY 261 between the Lake Ontario State Parkway and Manitou Beach was initially state-maintained; however, it has since been transferred to Monroe County, which maintains the road as the unsigned County Route 272 (CR 272). The section of NY 261 north of the parkway lost its designation by January 2017.

== Route description ==
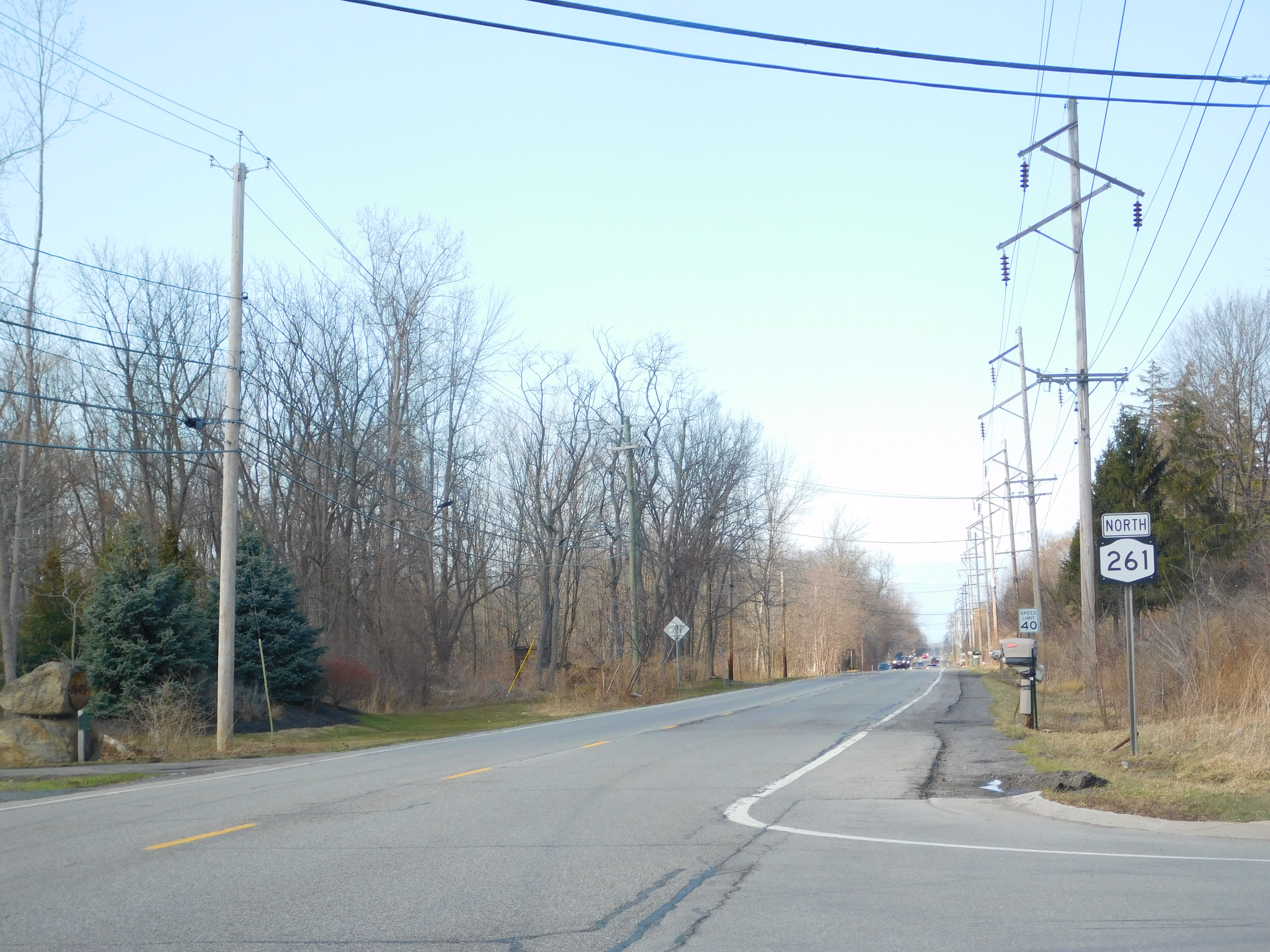
NY 261 in Parma

NY 261 begins at an intersection with NY 104 (Ridge Road) on the Greece–Parma town line. It is initially known as Manitou Road, a highway designated as CR 208 by Monroe County south of NY 104. The route heads northward, following the boundary between Greece and Parma as it traverses a predominantly rural portion of Monroe County. After 2.5 miles (4.0 km) of sporadic development amongst open fields and wooded areas, NY 261 enters the small hamlet of West Greece, where it meets NY 18 at Latta Road. The east–west route turns north here, overlapping with NY 261 for 0.4 miles (0.6 km) before turning westward onto Parma Center Road. Past NY 18, the amount of development remains sporadic well into northwestern Monroe County.

About 3.5 miles (5.6 km) north of NY 18, Manitou Road crosses Salmon Creek and parallels it for a short time before branching into two roads, both of which eventually intersect with the Lake Ontario State Parkway and reach the Lake Ontario shoreline. The left branch, which continues on the same linear north–south alignment as Manitou Road and thus is situated on the town line as well, is named Payne Beach Road and designated as CR 224. NY 261, however, takes the right fork, named Manitou Beach Road, northeast into Greece. The route continues to follow Salmon Creek into the hamlet of Braddock Heights, where NY 261 connects to the Lake Ontario State Parkway by way of an interchange. This exit is the westernmost interchange on the parkway in Monroe County, which becomes a four-lane divided highway until reaching Orleans County.

NY 261 continues northeast past the Lake Ontario State Parkway, serving a line of homes overlooking Braddock Bay to the southeast, and eventually Lake Ontario to the east. Until January 2017, state maintenance of NY 261 ceased just northeast of the junction with the parkway, at which point it became county-maintained as the unsigned CR 272. Roughly 0.5 miles (0.8 km) northeast of the Lake Ontario Parkway, NY 261 reached the lakeside hamlet of Manitou Beach. The route turned southward before reaching the lake shore, however; instead, it parallels the shoreline for 200 yards (183 m) before terminating at an isolated dead end south of the hamlet.

== History ==
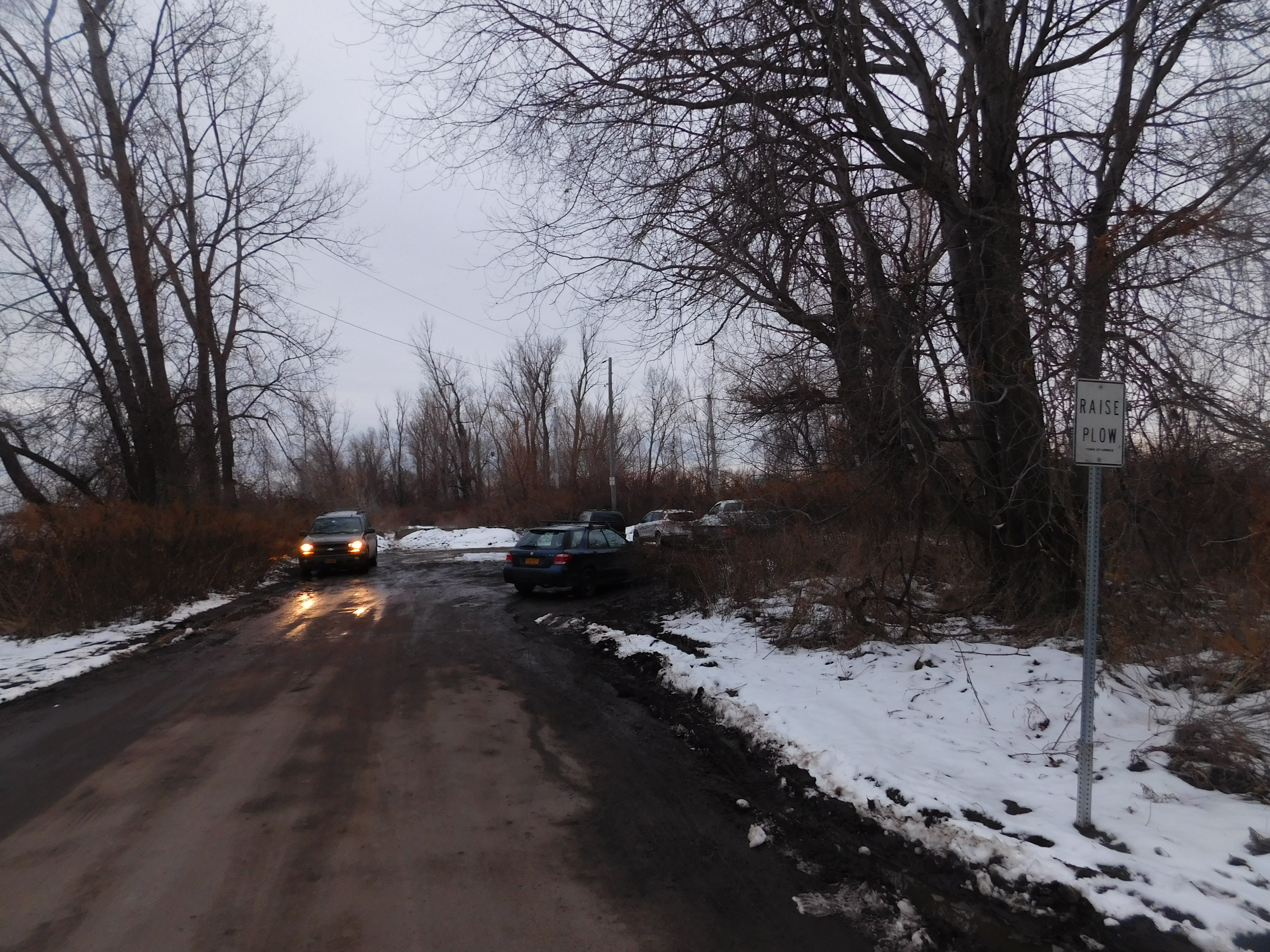
NY 261 at the dead end that marks its northern terminus in Manitou Beach

On June 9, 1915, the state of New York let a contract to improve all of modern NY 261 to state highway standards. The reconstruction cost $79,296.22 (equivalent to $2.29 million in 2024), and the roadway was added to the state highway system on December 26, 1916, as the unsigned State Highway 1281 (SH 1281). In the 1930 renumbering of state highways in New York, hundreds of state-maintained highways that did not have a posted route number were assigned one. NY 261 was assigned to SH 1281 by the following year. The alignment of the route has not changed since that time; however, ownership and maintenance of NY 261 northeast of the Lake Ontario State Parkway was transferred from the state to Monroe County at some point prior to 1997.

== Major intersections ==
The entire route is in Monroe County.

Location	mi	km	Destinations	Notes
Greece–Parma town line	0.00	0.00	NY 104	Southern terminus; hamlet of West Greece
Greece–Parma town line	2.51	4.04	NY 18 east	Southern terminus of NY 18 overlap
Greece–Parma town line	2.85	4.59	NY 18 west	Northern terminus of NY 18 overlap
Greece	7.70	12.39	Lake Ontario State Parkway	Northern terminus; interchange
1.000 mi = 1.609 km; 1.000 km = 0.621 mi: Concurrency terminus

== See also ==
- List of county routes in Monroe County, New York
