= John and Chauncey White House =

Historic house in New York, United States

- U.S. National Register of Historic Places
- U.S. Historic district
- Location within New York Location within the United States
- Location: 854 White Rd., near West Sweden, New York
- Coordinates: 43°10′38″N 77°59′13″W
- Area: 5.01 acres (2.03 ha)
- Built: c. 1828, 1851, 1880, 1919
- Architectural style: Italianate; Colonial Revival
- NRHP reference No.: 13001091
- Added to NRHP: January 15, 2014

John and Chauncey White House, also known as the John White Homestead, is a historic home and national historic district located near West Sweden, Monroe County, New York. It was built about 1851, and is a 2 1/2-story, L-shaped, Italianate style brick dwelling with a cross-gable roof. The house was doubled in size about 1880. It features a one-story, full width Colonial Revival porch added about 1900. Also on the property are the contributing barn (c. 1830, 1903), stone smokehouse (c. 1840), milk house and ice house (c. 1890), and a garage (c. 1915).

It was listed on the National Register of Historic Places in 2013.
