= Patrick O'Rorke =

Irish-American colonel in the Union Army

Patrick Henry O'Rorke
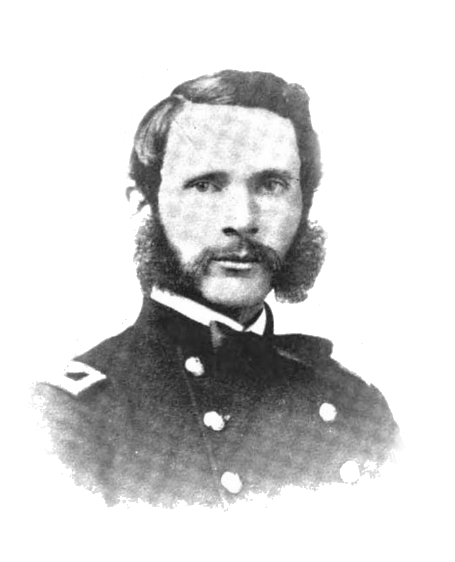
- Born: March 25, 1837; County Cavan, Ireland
- Died: July 2, 1863 (aged 26); Gettysburg, Pennsylvania
- Burial place: Holy Sepulchre Cemetery (Rochester, New York)
- Military career
- Allegiance: United States of America; Union
- Branch: United States Army; Union Army
- Service years: 1861–1863
- Rank: Colonel
- Commands: (New York (state)) 140th New York Volunteer Infantry Regiment
- Conflicts: American Civil War; Battle of Blackburn's Ford; First Battle of Bull Run; Port Royal Expedition; Battle of Fort Pulaski; Battle of Fredericksburg; Battle of Chancellorsville; Battle of Gettysburg †

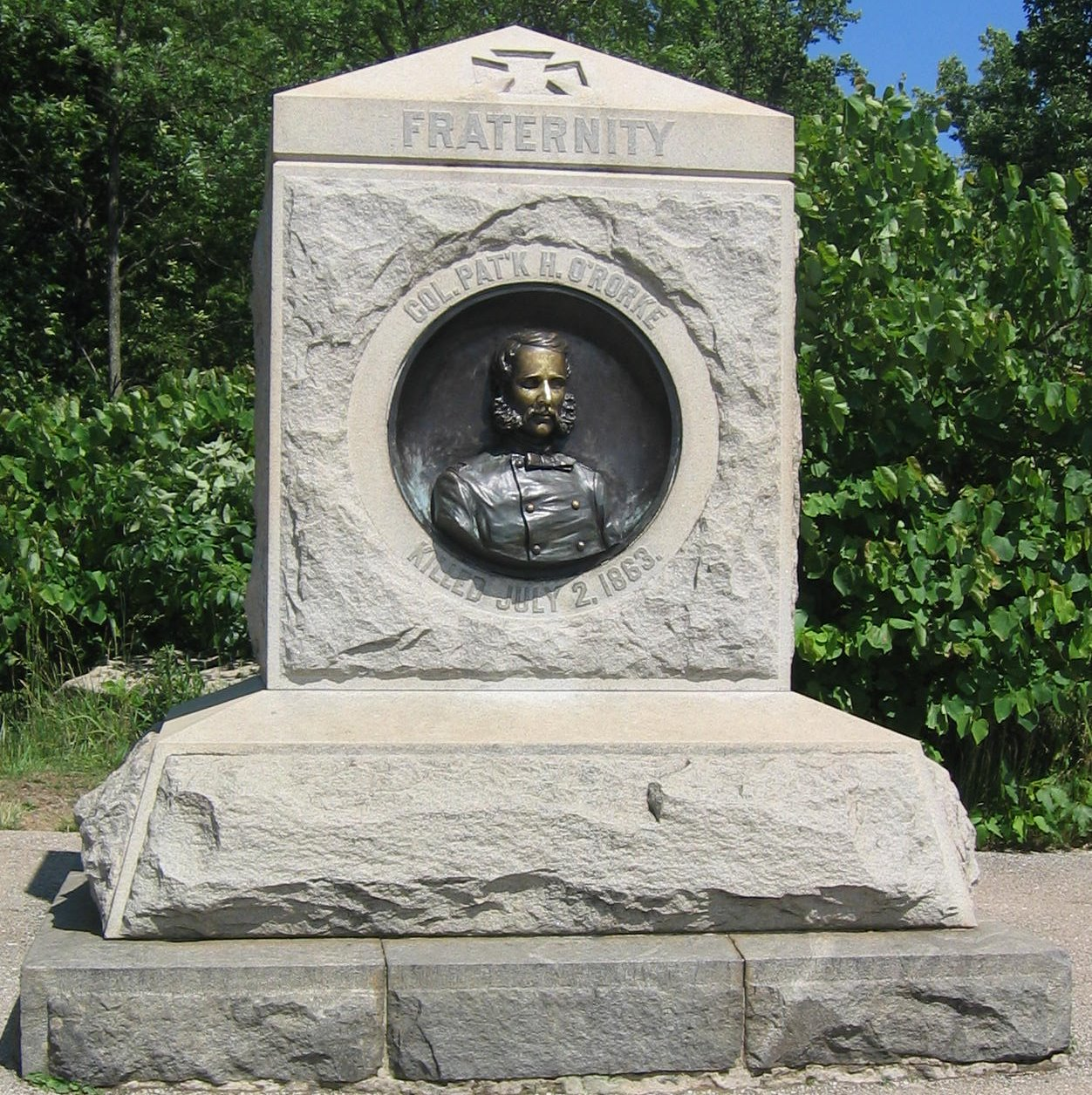
Monument to 140th New York. and O'Rorke at the Gettysburg Battlefield.

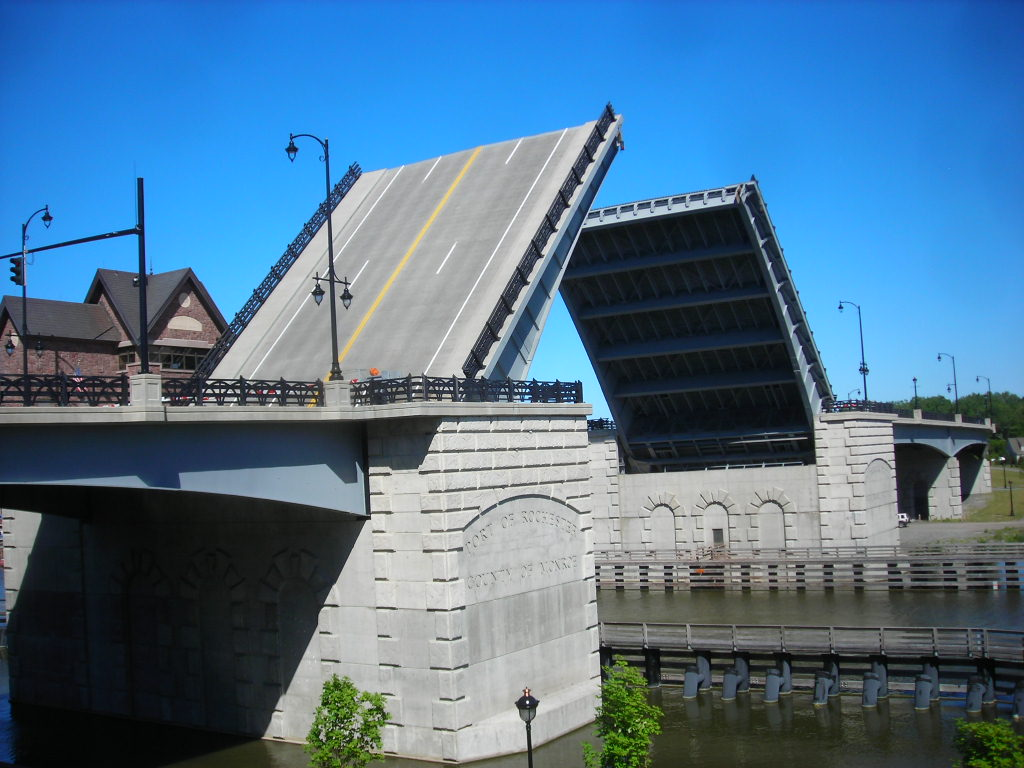
O'Rorke Bridge

Patrick Henry O'Rorke or O'Rourke (March 25, 1837 – July 2, 1863) was an Irish-American immigrant who became a colonel in the Union Army during the American Civil War and was killed at the Battle of Gettysburg.

== Early life ==
O'Rorke was born in County Cavan, Ireland on March 25, 1837. He was a year old when his parents emigrated to the United States. In 1842, his family moved to Rochester, New York, where he attended the public schools. In 1853, at age 16, he was awarded a scholarship to the University of Rochester; however, before attending college, his father died, and O'Rorke, to support his family, took a job as a marble cutter at the request of his mother.

In 1857, he was appointed a cadet in the U.S. Military Academy at West Point, graduating first in his class in June 1861, the same class as George Armstrong Custer, who would graduate last. He was then commissioned to the Corps of Engineers as second lieutenant.

== Civil War ==
In July 1861, O'Rorke served at the Battle of Blackburn's Ford and the First Battle of Bull Run, where his horse was killed from under him, and then as assistant engineer in preparing the defenses of Washington, D.C. He sailed with the Port Royal Expedition in October 1861 and provided vital reconnaissance and engineering in constructing the batteries on Jones, Bird, and Tybee Islands for the bombardment and siege of Fort Pulaski, on Cockspur Island near Savannah, Georgia. Following the capture of the fort on April 11, 1862, O'Rorke was selected as one of the officers to receive the surrender.

Following the battle, O'Rorke returned to Rochester where he was married on July 9 to Clara Bishop.

In September 1862, O'Rorke was appointed colonel of the 140th New York Infantry which was composed mostly of volunteers from his hometown of Rochester and heavily of fellow Irish-Americans. He led the 140th New York in the Battle of Fredericksburg in December. At Chancellorsville in May 1863, he temporarily commanded the 3rd Brigade, 2nd Division, V Corps which included the 140th New York, as well as the 5th New York and the 146th New York.

At Gettysburg, O'Rorke was back in command of his regiment while Brig. Gen. Stephen H. Weed commanded the 3rd Brigade. The 140th New York arrived in time for the second day of fighting (July 2, 1863). Brig. Gen. Gouverneur K. Warren was desperately searching for units to defend Little Round Top, and he encountered O'Rorke's New Yorkers, the rearmost regiment in Weed's brigade, on their way to reinforce the III Corps. O'Rorke initially declined Warren's request for assistance because he was under orders to follow his brigade. Warren told him, "Never mind that, Paddy. Bring them up on the double-quick and don't stop for aligning. I'll take the responsibility." O'Rorke rushed his men to the crest of the hill and plunged down its western face without pause, driving the attacking Confederates back down the slope. During the counterattack, O'Rorke caught up his regimental colors and, mounting a rock to urge on his men, was struck in the neck and fell dead. The Comte de Paris in his Histoire de la guerre civile en Amérique (VI, iv, 379) says this was one of the most striking and dramatic episodes of the battle. A decorated member of O'Rorke's command, Lieutenant Porter Farley, in his noted work An Unvarnished Tale: The Public and Private Civil War Writings of Porter Farley, described O'Rorke's action on Little Round Top as among the most instrumental of the entire civil war, and many respected military historians have further commented that O'Rorke's service, heroism and selflessness, at such critical time in the battle, were at least equal to that of the much better known, Congressional Medal of Honor recipient, Joshua Lawrence Chamberlain.

== Burials and funeral ==
O'Rorke was initially buried by members of the 140 New York near Gettysburg alongside General Weed. However, on about what would have been their first anniversary, O'Rorke's widow Clara traveled to retrieve the body and it was returned by train to Rochester.

A funeral for Colonel O'Rorke was held on July 15 in Rochester drawing hundreds of attendees, both Catholic and Protestant and across a range of ethnic groups. The event is credited with bringing unity to the community. He was initially laid to rest in a Catholic cemetery on Pinnacle Hill, but was ultimately interred in the Holy Sepulchre Cemetery in Rochester.

O'Rorke's widow became a member of the Society of the Sacred Heart and one of the most successful educators in its New York convents.

== In memoriam ==
After the war, Rochester area veterans founded O'Rorke Post 1 of the Grand Army of the Republic veterans society, the second post formed for the society.

The current Ancient Order of Hibernian (AOH) Division of Rochester was founded in 1894 and is named after Colonel O'Rorke. The AOH itself, an Irish-Catholic fraternal order, was founded in New York City in 1836. (https://www.AOHRochester.com).

In 1889, New York erected a monument to the 140th Infantry on Little Round Top. The front of the monument bears a relief image of O'Rorke.

In 2004, a bascule bridge in Charlotte (Rochester), New York, known as the O'Rorke Bridge, was dedicated to the memory of Colonel O'Rorke.
