= Sweden, New York =

- Town
- Location in Monroe County and the state of New York

- Location of New York in the United States
- Coordinates: 43°12′19″N 77°56′30″W
- Country: United States
- State: New York
- County: Monroe
- Incorporated: April 2, 1813; 213 years ago

Government
  - Town supervisor: Kevin G. Johnson (R) 2018 - present Town council: Robert Muesebeck (R); Rhonda Humby (R); Randy Hoke (R); Patricia Hayles (R)

Area
  - Total: 33.83 sq mi (87.62 km^{2})
  - Land: 33.68 sq mi (87.23 km^{2})
  - Water: 0.15 sq mi (0.39 km^{2})
- Elevation: 407 ft (124 m)

Population (2020)
  - Total: 13,244
  - Density: 393.23/sq mi (151.83/km^{2})
- Time zone: UTC-5 (EST)
  - Summer (DST): UTC-4 (EDT)
- ZIP Codes: 14420 (Brockport); 14416 (Bergen); 14428 (Churchville); 14559 (Spencerport)
- Area code: 585
- FIPS code: 36-055-72455
- Website: www.townofswedenny.gov

Sweden is a town in Monroe County, New York, United States. It is part of the Rochester metropolitan area. The town is located on the west border of the county. The Erie Canal passes through the northern part of the town, and Route 19 is a major north–south highway. The population was 13,244 at the 2020 census, down from 14,175 in 2010.

== History ==
The area that is now the town of Sweden was part of the Triangle Tract. Settlers began arriving before 1806. The town was created by a mandate of the New York State Legislature in 1813 to break up the west part of the county into three new towns named Bergen, Sweden, and Murray.

The town of Sweden was established in 1814 from the town of Murray in part of Monroe County. The first Sweden town meeting was held on April 5, 1814.

Lake View Cemetery was listed on the National Register of Historic Places in 2009.

== Geography ==
Sweden is on the western edge of Monroe County. It is bordered on the north by the town of Clarkson and on the east by the towns of Parma and Ogden, all in Monroe County; on the west by the town of Clarendon in Orleans County; and on the south by the town of Bergen in Genesee County. Downtown Rochester is 18 miles (29 km) to the east. The village of Brockport, situated along the Eric Canal, occupies the northern part of Sweden.

New York State Route 19 crosses the center of the town, leading north through Brockport 9 miles (14 km) to Hamlin and south 6 miles (10 km) to Bergen village. State Route 31 crosses the northern part of the town, just south of Brockport, and leads east to Rochester and west 24 miles (39 km) to Medina.

According to the U.S. Census Bureau, the town of Sweden has a total area of 33.83 square miles (87.6 km^{2}), of which 33.68 square miles (87.2 km^{2}) are land and 0.15 square miles (0.39 km^{2}), or 0.45%, are water.

== Demographics ==
Historical population
Census	Pop.	Note	%±
1820	2,761		—
1830	2,938		6.4%
1840	3,133		6.6%
1850	3,623		15.6%
1860	4,045		11.6%
1870	4,558		12.7%
1880	5,734		25.8%
1890	5,201		−9.3%
1900	4,743		−8.8%
1910	4,885		3.0%
1920	3,984		−18.4%
1930	4,613		15.8%
1940	4,698		1.8%
1950	5,982		27.3%
1960	7,224		20.8%
1970	11,461		58.7%
1980	14,859		29.6%
1990	14,181		−4.6%
2000	13,716		−3.3%
2010	14,175		3.3%
2020	13,244		−6.6%
U.S. Decennial Census

As of the census of 2000, there were 13,716 people, 4,581 households, and 2,757 families residing in the town. The population density was 408.9 inhabitants per square mile (157.9/km^{2}). There were 4,843 housing units at an average density of 144.4 per square mile (55.8/km^{2}). The racial makeup of the town was 92.59% White, 3.72% African American, 0.20% Native American, 1.04% Asian, 0.06% Pacific Islander, 1.06% from other races, and 1.33% from two or more races. Hispanic or Latino of any race were 2.88% of the population.

There were 4,581 households, out of which 29.8% had children under the age of 18 living with them, 46.5% were married couples living together, 10.5% had a female householder with no husband present, and 39.8% were non-families. 26.5% of all households were made up of individuals, and 7.4% had someone living alone who was 65 years of age or older. The average household size was 2.52 and the average family size was 3.06.

In the town, the population was spread out, with 19.9% under the age of 18, 30.1% from 18 to 24, 23.2% from 25 to 44, 19.0% from 45 to 64, and 7.8% who were 65 years of age or older. The median age was 25 years. For every 100 females, there were 94.8 males. For every 100 females age 18 and over, there were 93.4 males.

The median income for a household in the town was $44,151, and the median income for a family was $58,750. Males had a median income of $39,850 versus $27,103 for females. The per capita income for the town was $17,874. About 4.3% of families and 13.3% of the population were below the poverty line, including 6.9% of those under age 18 and 7.3% of those age 65 or over.

== Government ==
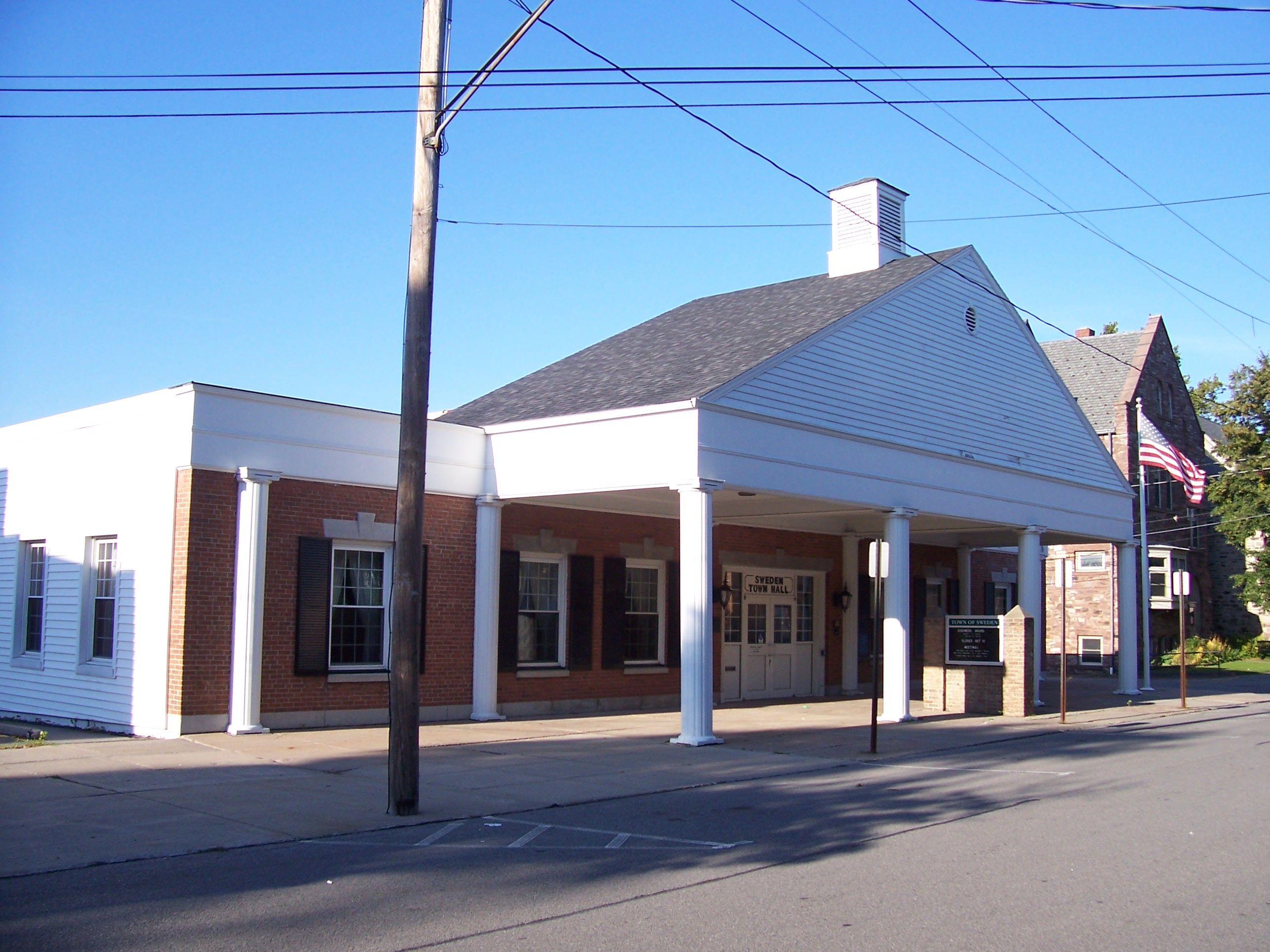
Sweden town hall

The town is governed by a town board consisting of a town supervisor and four councilpersons, all elected by registered town voters.

== Notable people ==
- Emma Stark Hampton, fifth national president, Woman's Relief Corps
- Amaziah B. James, former US congressman

== Communities and locations in Sweden ==
- Brockport – A village near the northern town line that is home to the State University of New York Brockport.
- Ledgedale Airpark (7G0) – A general aviation airport is located southeast of Brockport.
- Seymour Library - A public library serving Brockport, Clarkson, & Sweden NY
- Sweden Center – A hamlet on Route 19 south of Brockport.
- West Sweden – A location in the southwest corner of the town. The John and Chauncey White House was listed on the National Register of Historic Places in 2013.
