= Braddock Bay =

Bay in New York, United States

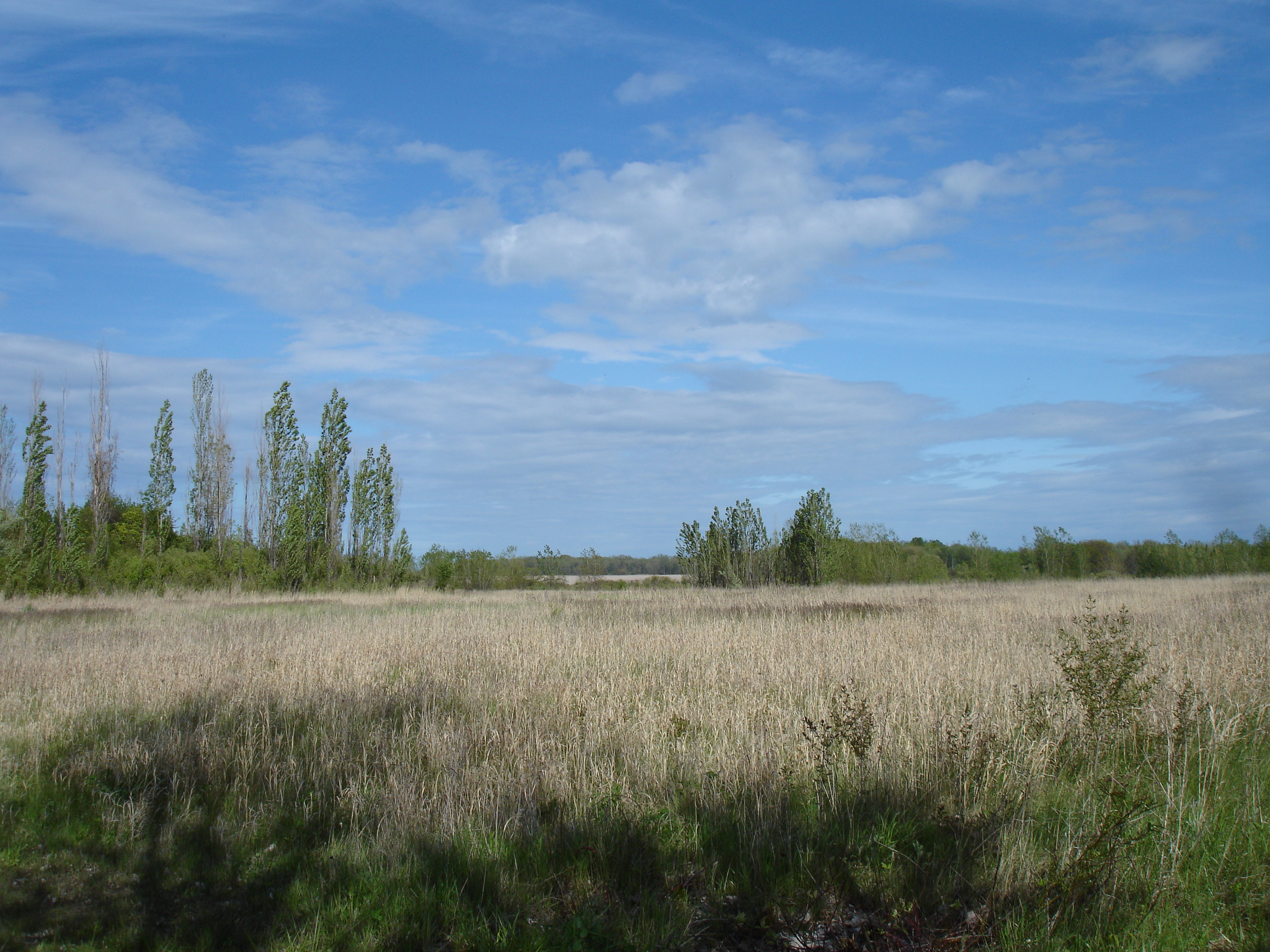
- Grassy fields at Beatty Point in Braddock Bay support ground-nesting bird species.

- Location within New York
- Location: Along Lake Ontario in Monroe County, New York
- Coordinates: 43°18′44″N 77°42′57″W

Braddock Bay, sometimes improperly referred to as Braddock's Bay, is a small bay of Lake Ontario located in Monroe County northwest of Rochester, New York in the United States. Braddock Bay is renowned for being an excellent bird-watching location, as raptors and other birds congregate there when migrating north in spring.

== History ==
The bay's name is derived from a "barbarous mispronunciation" of its original name, Prideaux Bay, which referred to British General John Prideaux. The name was first given after Prideaux and his force of 3,200 soldiers encamped at the bay in 1759, on their way to the Battle of Fort Niagara during the French and Indian War, where Prideaux would be killed. Initial mispronunciation of the bay's name led to some confusion with British General Edward Braddock, resulting in the bay's current name.

Braddock Bay Marina was home to United States Coast Guard Auxiliary Flotilla 45 from its creation in November 1974 until its dissolution at the end of 2011.

== Land management ==
Much of the land in this complex of marshland and small bays is managed by the New York State Department of Environmental Conservation (NYSDEC) as the 2,125-acre (8.60 km^{2}) Braddock Bay Wildlife Management Area. The WMA was created in 1982 after the New York State Office of Parks, Recreation and Historic Preservation (NYSOPRHP) transferred all but approximately 375 acres (1.52 km^{2}) of the former Braddock Bay State Park (established in 1956) to the NYSDEC. The remaining parcels were leased to the Town of Greece in 1981.

As of 2014, the NYSOPRHP retains ownership of 387 acres (1.57 km^{2}) on the bay. Much of this property is maintained by the Town of Greece as Braddock Bay Park, which is located on the east side of the open bay and includes a hawk-watching station.

== Birdwatching ==
The Braddock Bay Raptor Research center sponsors banding of both owls and hawks, whose numbers peak in late March and early April.

The Braddock Bay complex also includes:

- Owl Woods (Pear Orchard) – banding station
- The Spits (East & West)
- The Bay
- Cranberry, Long and Buck Ponds
- Beatty Point: a portion of the Braddock's Bay that has extensive grassy fields, a haven for the numerous grassland bird species (nests can easily be crushed when wandering off-trail in spring).
- Hogan Point and Hincher Road
- Northrup Creek
- Salmon Creek
- Island Cottage Woods
- Rose Marsh

Birds to look for include:

- Spring: eastern kingbird, indigo bunting, bobolink, Savannah sparrow and northern harrier, small groups of ducks, robins, swans and Nelson's sparrow.
- Summer: black terns, Caspian, common and Forster's terns during migration periods, red-winged blackbirds, swans, great blue herons, and sedge wren occasionally
- Fall: red-winged blackbirds, sparrows, swans, great blue herons, and turkey vultures
- Winter: chickadees
