= Parma, New York =

- Town
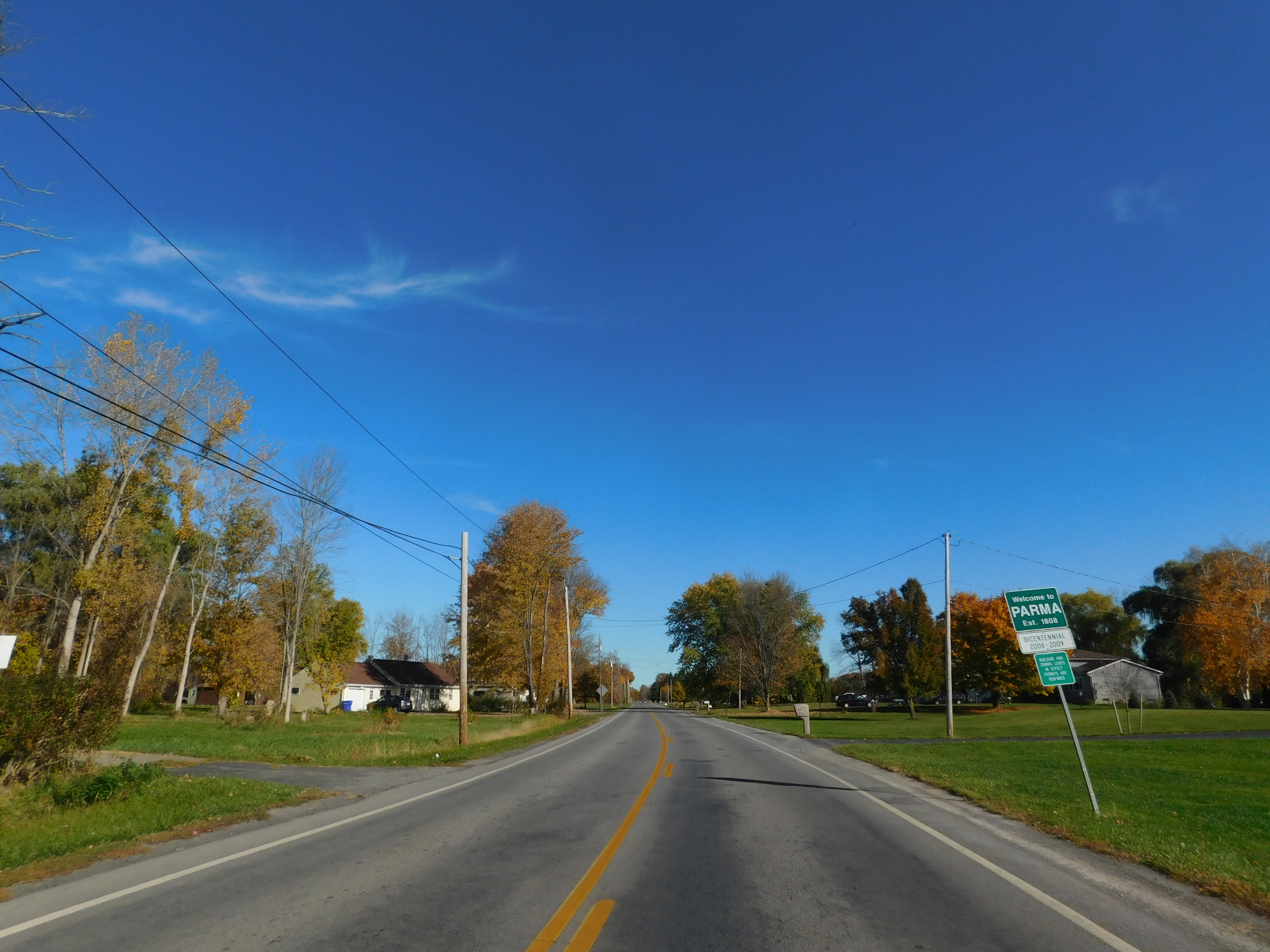
- Monroe County Route 185 (Parma Center Road) eastbound entering the town of Parma

- Location in Monroe County and the state of New York

- Location of New York in the United States
- Coordinates: 43°15′N 77°47′W
- Country: United States
- State: New York
- County: Monroe
- Established: April 8, 1808; 218 years ago

Area
  - Total: 42.98 sq mi (111.33 km^{2})
  - Land: 42.02 sq mi (108.84 km^{2})
  - Water: 0.96 sq mi (2.49 km^{2})
- Elevation: 325 ft (99 m)

Population (2020)
  - Total: 16,217
  - Density: 390/sq mi (149/km^{2})
- Time zone: UTC-5 (EST)
  - Summer (DST): UTC-4 (EDT)
- ZIP Codes: 14468 (Hilton); 14559 (Spencerport); 14420 (Brockport); 14626 (Greece)
- Area code: 585
- FIPS code: 36-055-56561
- Website: parmany.gov

Parma is a town in Monroe County, New York, United States. The population was 16,217 at the 2020 census.

== History ==
The town of Parma was established on April 8, 1808, in what was then Genesee County, from the town of Northampton. The new town was named after the city of Parma in Italy.

== Geography ==
Parma is in northwestern Monroe County and is bordered on the north by the shore of Lake Ontario, on the west by the towns of Hamlin, Clarkson and Sweden, on the south by the town of Ogden, and on the east by the town of Greece. Downtown Rochester is 16 miles (26 km) to the southeast.

According to the U.S. Census Bureau, the town of Parma has a total area of 42.98 square miles (111.3 km^{2}), of which 42.02 square miles (108.8 km^{2}) are land and 0.97 square miles (2.51 km^{2}), or 2.25%, are water.

== Demographics ==
Historical population
Census	Pop.	Note	%±
1820	1,342		—
1830	2,639		96.6%
1840	2,652		0.5%
1850	2,947		11.1%
1860	2,904		−1.5%
1870	2,864		−1.4%
1880	3,180		11.0%
1890	2,912		−8.4%
1900	2,814		−3.4%
1910	2,954		5.0%
1920	2,923		−1.0%
1930	3,222		10.2%
1940	3,387		5.1%
1950	4,049		19.5%
1960	6,277		55.0%
1970	10,748		71.2%
1980	12,585		17.1%
1990	13,873		10.2%
2000	14,822		6.8%
2010	15,633		5.5%
2020	16,217		3.7%
U.S. Decennial census

As of the census of 2020, there were 16,217 people, 6,347 households, and 4,492 families residing in the town. The population density was 385.9 inhabitants per square mile (149.0/km^{2}). There were 6,627 housing units at an average density of 157.7 per square mile (60.9/km^{2}). The racial makeup of the town was 92.1% white, 1.8% Black or African American, 0.2% Native American, 0.5% Asian, 0% Pacific Islander, 1% from other races, and 4.4% from two or more races. Hispanic or Latino of any race were 3.2% of the population.

There were 6,347 households, out of which 20.9% had children under the age of 18 living with them, 56.9% were married couples living together, and 21.5% had a female householder with no husband present. 22.8% of all households were made up of individuals, and 10.6% had someone living alone who was 65 years of age or older.

In the town, the population was spread out, with 25.2% under the age of 18, 6.9% from 18 to 24, 22.1% from 25 to 44, 27.2% from 45 to 64, and 18.6% who were 65 years of age or older. The median age was 41.2 years. For every 100 males 18 and over, there were 98.2 females.

The median income for a household in the town was $93,142, and the median income for a family was $111,972. Males living alone had a median income of $35,402 versus $33,611 for females living alone. The per capita income for the town was $38,254. About 6.3% of the population were below the poverty line, including 5.5% of those under age 18 and 6.1% of those age 65 or over.

== Government ==
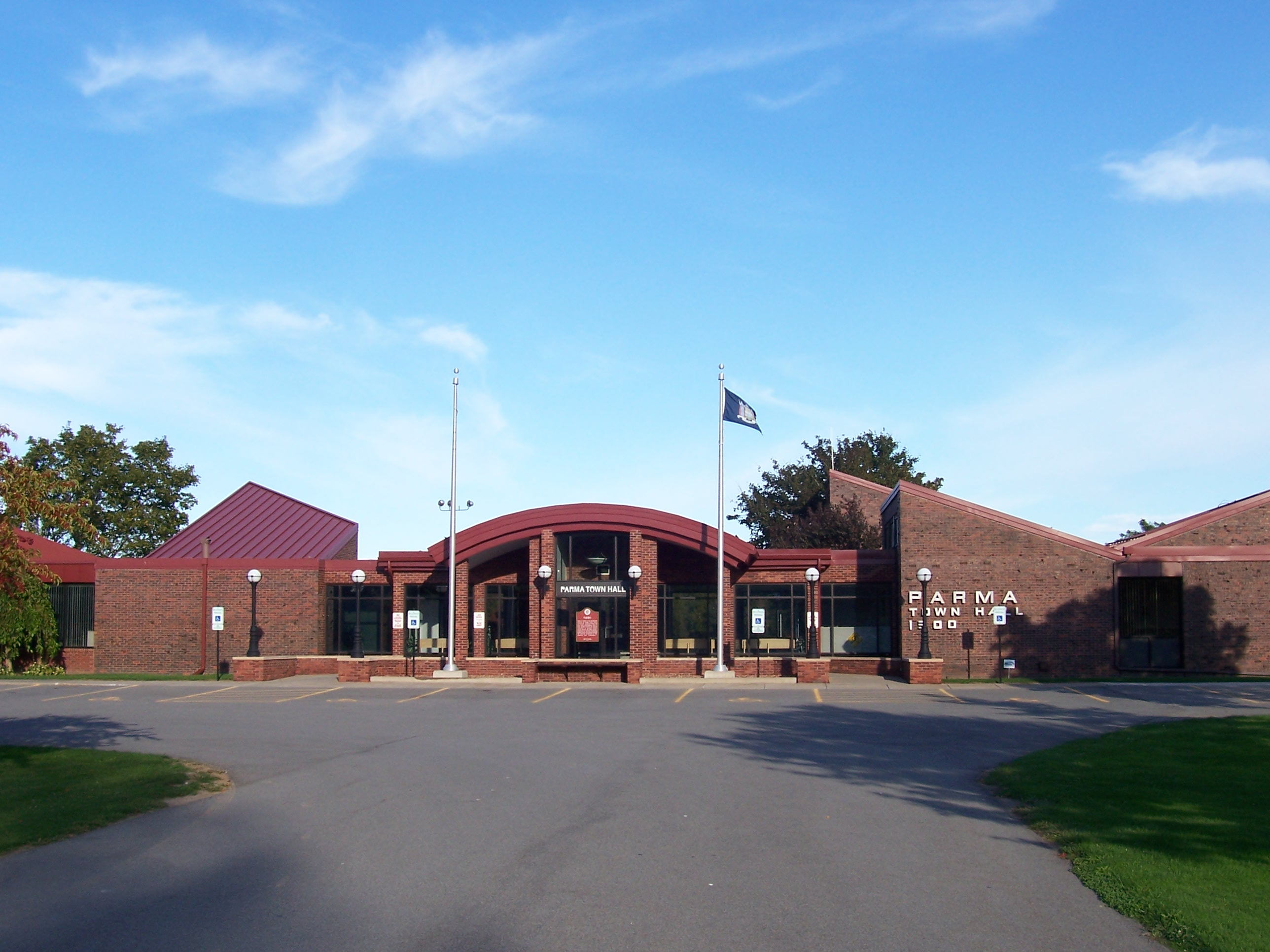
Parma town hall

The town is governed by a Town Board consisting of a Town Supervisor and four Town Council members, all elected by registered town voters. The Town Supervisor serves as the head administrator of the town, and additionally serves as the head financial officer of the town. The Town Council members are responsible for adopting local ordinances, writing new laws, and approving all town appointments for the purpose of fulfilling and executing directives and policies.

Current Town Board members:

- James Roose - Town Supervisor
- David Ciufo - Deputy Supervisor & Town Council
- Tod Ferguson - Town Council
- Linda Judd - Town Council
- Thomas J. Sercu - Town Council

== Education ==
The Hilton Central School District comprises the majority of the town with the southern portion along the 104 Corridor in the Spencerport Central School District and a southwestern portion in the Brockport Central School District.

== Communities and locations in Parma ==
- Hilton - village in the northern part of the town
- Parma Center
- Parma Corners

== Notable people ==
- John Baker (1832–1915), congressman from Indiana and federal judge
- George Baldwin Smith (1823–1879), mayor of Madison, Wisconsin, and fourth Attorney General of Wisconsin
- Cathy Turner (born 1962), short-track speed skater and two-time Olympic gold medalist
