= Colonel Patrick O'Rorke Memorial Bridge =

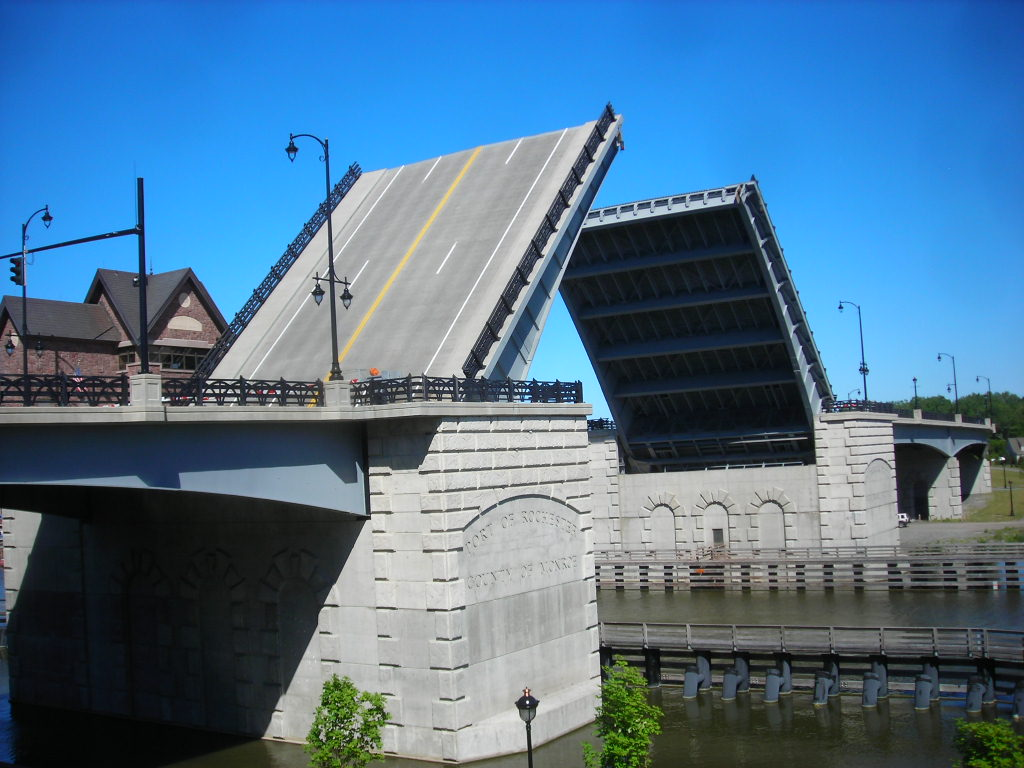
- The O'Rorke Bridge, with its movable span in the up position.
- Coordinates: 43°14′54″N 77°36′41″W
- Carries: Four lanes of Pattonwood Drive (NY 943F)
- Crosses: CSX Charlotte Runner and Genesee River
- Locale: Rochester and Irondequoit, New York
- Maintained by: New York State Department of Transportation
- Preceded by: Stutson Street Bridge

History
- Opened: 2004

The Colonel Patrick O'Rorke Memorial Bridge is a bascule bridge in New York, United States, that connects the Rochester neighborhood of Charlotte to the town of Irondequoit. The bridge, located about 6 miles (10 km) north of downtown Rochester, is named for Civil War Colonel Patrick O'Rorke, who grew up in Rochester and led the New York 140th Infantry at the Battle of Gettysburg. He was killed in action assisting the defense of Little Round Top. The bridge carries Pattonwood Drive over the CSX Transportation-owned Charlotte Running Track and the Genesee River near its mouth at Lake Ontario. The movable part of the bridge is 243 feet (74 m) long, while the western approach is 148 feet (45 m) and the eastern approach is 530 feet (162 m).

The O'Rorke Bridge replaced the Stutson Street Bridge, a smaller bascule bridge located about 250 feet (76 m) downstream. The current bridge carries four 11-foot (3 m) wide car lanes, as well as having two bike lanes and wide sidewalks, where the old bridge was only two lanes. The bridge was dedicated on October 2, 2004. It was maintained by Monroe County until November 26, 2007, when ownership of the structure was transferred to the state of New York as part of a highway maintenance swap between the two levels of government. It is now maintained by the New York State Department of Transportation as New York State Route 943F, an unsigned reference route.

== See also ==
- List of reference routes in New York
