= Ogden, New York =

- Town
- Location in Monroe County and the state of New York

- Location of New York in the United States
- Coordinates: 43°10′N 77°48′W
- Country: United States
- State: New York
- County: Monroe
- Founded: January 27, 1817; 209 years ago

Government
  - Town supervisor: Mike Zale (R) Town council: Josh Hinman (R); Sal Gerbino(R); Aaron Baker (R); Steve Toms (R)

Area
  - Total: 36.73 sq mi (95.14 km^{2})
  - Land: 36.48 sq mi (94.48 km^{2})
  - Water: 0.25 sq mi (0.66 km^{2})
- Elevation: 325 ft (99 m)

Population (2020)
  - Total: 20,270
  - Density: 555.51/sq mi (214.48/km^{2})
- Time zone: UTC-5 (EST)
  - Summer (DST): UTC-4 (EDT)
- ZIP Codes: 14559 (Spencerport); 14410 (Adams Basin); 14428 (Churchville); 14624 (Gates)
- Area code: 585
- FIPS code: 36-055-54474
- Website: ogdenny.gov

Ogden is a town in Monroe County, New York, United States. The population was 20,270 at the 2020 census. The Erie Canal passes through Ogden.

== History ==
The land in Ogden and surrounding areas was transferred from the Native Americans to Phelps and Gorham. The land was surveyed and was divided into townships and lots. The original parcel was about 37sq miles. The New York State Legislature established Genesee county in 1802. The town of Northampton was one of four towns created during the organization of the new county.

On December 8, 1807 the town of Northampton was divided and the town of Parma was created. About nine years later Ogden was split off from Parma. This occurred on January 17, 1817.

== Geography ==
Ogden is in western Monroe County and is bordered on the north by the town of Parma, on the east by the towns of Greece and Gates, on the west by the town of Sweden, and on the south by the towns of Riga and Chili. A short distance at Ogden's southwest corner is bordered by the town of Bergen in Genesee County. Downtown Rochester is 10 miles (16 km) to the east.

According to the U.S. Census Bureau, the town of Ogden has a total area of 36.74 square miles (95.2 km^{2}), of which 36.48 square miles (94.5 km^{2}) are land and 0.26 square miles (0.67 km^{2}), or 0.70%, are water. The southeastern part of town is drained by tributaries of the Genesee River, while the remainder of the town drains to the north via direct tributaries of Lake Ontario, such as Salmon Creek, Northrup Creek, and Larkin Creek. The Erie Canal runs east to west through the northern part of the town, passing through the village of Spencerport.

== Demographics ==
Historical population
Census	Pop.	Note	%±
1820	1,435		—
1830	2,401		67.3%
1840	2,404		0.1%
1850	2,598		8.1%
1860	2,712		4.4%
1870	2,874		6.0%
1880	2,967		3.2%
1890	2,571		−13.3%
1900	2,616		1.8%
1910	3,143		20.1%
1920	2,681		−14.7%
1930	3,159		17.8%
1940	3,435		8.7%
1950	3,970		15.6%
1960	7,262		82.9%
1970	11,736		61.6%
1980	14,693		25.2%
1990	16,912		15.1%
2000	18,492		9.3%
2010	19,856		7.4%
2020	20,270		2.1%
U.S. Decennial Census

As of the census of 2000, there were 18,492 people, 6,527 households, and 5,032 families residing in the town. The population density was 505.9 inhabitants per square mile (195.3/km^{2}). There were 6,740 housing units at an average density of 184.4 per square mile (71.2/km^{2}). The racial makeup of the town was 96.53% White, 1.35% African American, 0.21% Native American, 0.74% Asian, 0.03% Pacific Islander, 0.29% from other races, and 0.86% from two or more races. Hispanic or Latino of any race were 1.37% of the population.

There were 6,527 households, out of which 39.9% had children under the age of 18 living with them, 64.9% were married couples living together, 9.2% had a female householder with no husband present, and 22.9% were non-families. 18.4% of all households were made up of individuals, and 5.5% had someone living alone who was 65 years of age or older. The average household size was 2.78 and the average family size was 3.19.

In the town, the population was spread out, with 27.8% under the age of 18, 8.7% from 18 to 24, 30.2% from 25 to 44, 24.5% from 45 to 64, and 8.9% who were 65 years of age or older. The median age was 36 years. For every 100 females, there were 96.2 males. For every 100 females age 18 and over, there were 92.3 males.

The median income for a household in the town was $59,240, and the median income for a family was $64,606. Males had a median income of $46,145 versus $30,438 for females. The per capita income for the town was $23,587. About 2.0% of families and 2.7% of the population were below the poverty line, including 2.3% of those under age 18 and 2.6% of those age 65 or over.

== Government ==
The town is governed by a town board, consisting of a town supervisor, deputy supervisor and four board members, all elected by registered town voters. The Supervisor responsibilities are similar to that of both a CEO and CFO of a corporation. The town's current (2025) Supervisor is Mike Zale.

In addition to the Board, there is a town Clerk, buildings department, Highways department, Parks and Recreation, Historian, and public safety.

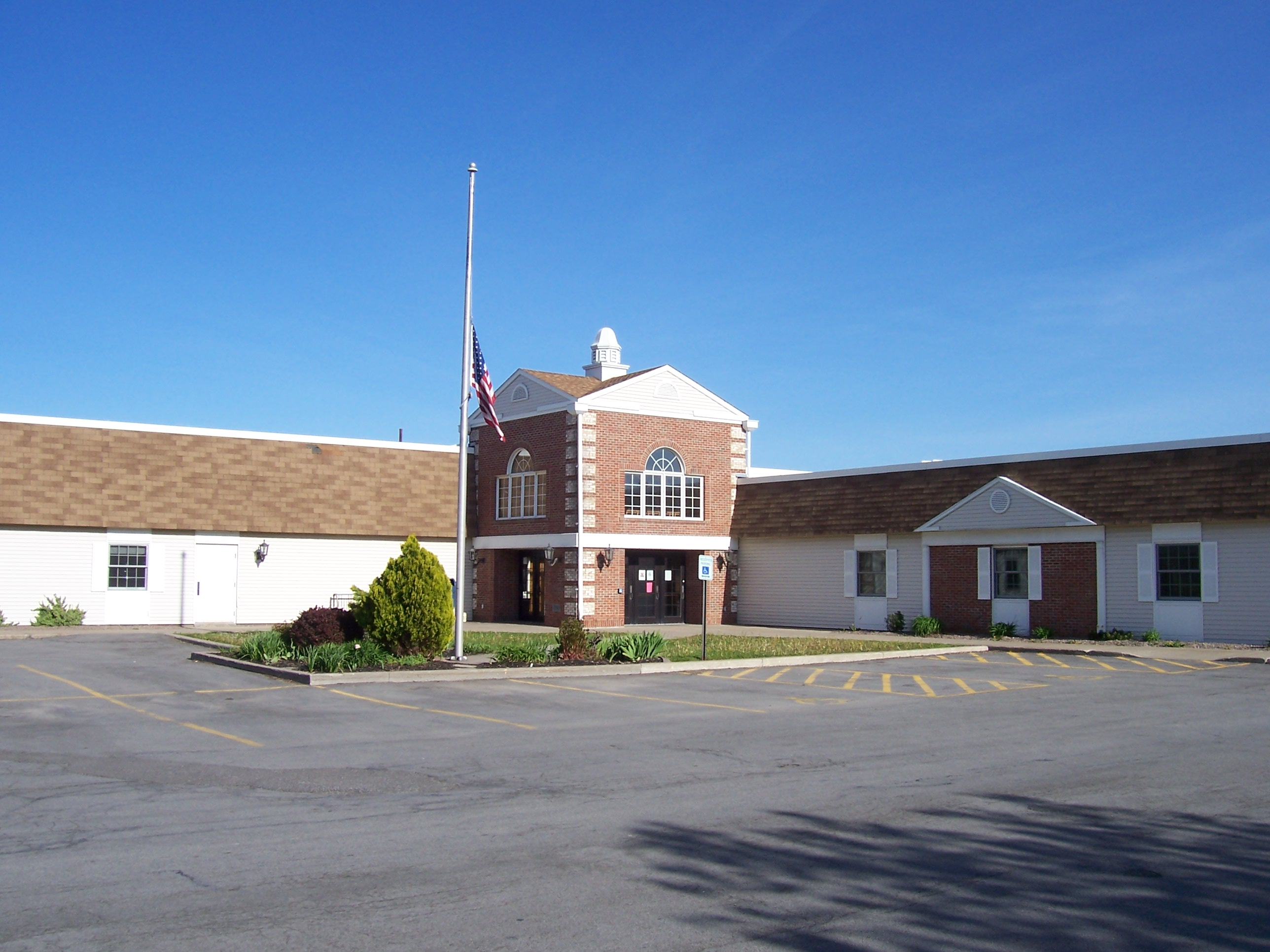
Ogden town offices

== Communities and locations in Ogden ==
- Adams Basin – the unincorporated hamlet of Adams Basin is within the town.
- Spencerport – the village of Spencerport is within the town.

The now-defunct hamlet of Town Pump is also listed in the official New York State Gazetteer, maintained and published by the New York State Department of Health, which includes numerous defunct hamlets and towns, some with alternate or archaic spellings.

== Notable people ==
- Morilla M. Norton (1865-1916), author, poet
