= Clarkson Corners Historic District =

Historic district in New York, United States

- U.S. National Register of Historic Places
- U.S. Historic district
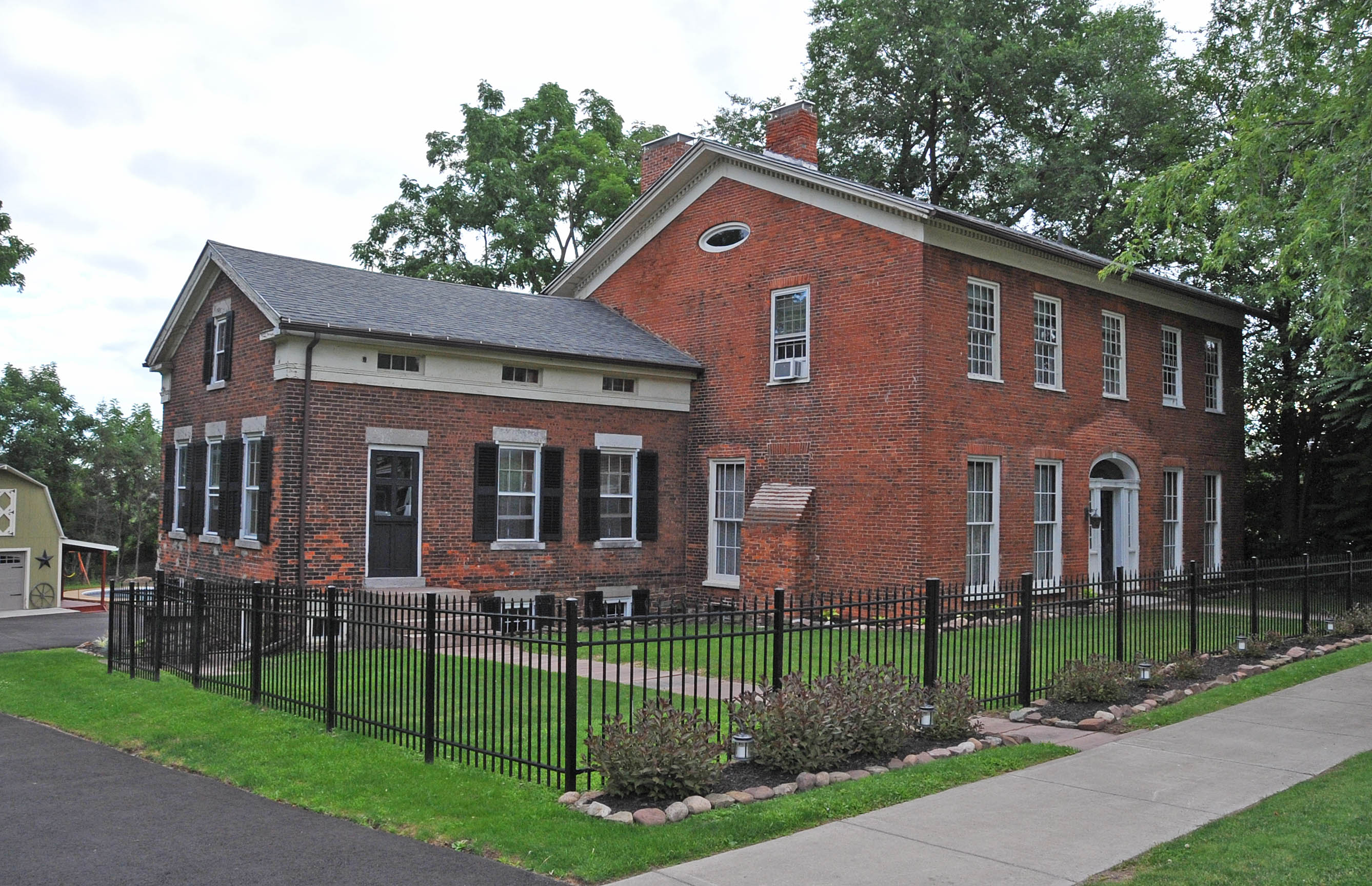
- The Henry R. Selden House in the district

- Location within New York Location within the United States
- Location: Jct. of Ridge and Lake Rds. and E and W along Ridge and S along Lake, Clarkson Corners, New York
- Coordinates: 43°13′57″N 77°55′44″W
- Area: 45 acres (18 ha)
- Architect: Multiple
- Architectural style: Late Victorian, Mid 19th Century Revival, Early Republic
- NRHP reference No.: 94001076
- Added to NRHP: September 02, 1994

Clarkson Corners Historic District is a national historic district located at the hamlet of Clarkson Corners in Monroe County, New York. The district encompasses approximately 60 historic resources associated with the Clarkson crossroads development between about 1804 and 1910.

It was listed on the National Register of Historic Places in 1994.
