= Irondequoit Bay Bridge =

- Irondequoit Bay Bridge, seen from the southwest.
- Coordinates: 43.21178°N 77.53356°W
- Carries: Six lanes of NY 104
- Crosses: Irondequoit Bay
- Locale: Irondequoit–Webster, New York
- Maintained by: NYSDOT

Characteristics
- Total length: 2,375.36 feet (724.01 m)
- Width: 87 feet (27 m)
- Clearance below: 45 feet (14 m)

History
- Opened: February 3, 1970

Statistics
- Daily traffic: 67,229 (2006)

Location
- Interactive map of Irondequoit Bay Bridge

The Irondequoit Bay Bridge is a 2,375.36-foot (724.01 m) continuous truss bridge spanning Irondequoit Bay in eastern Monroe County, New York, in the United States. It is 87 feet (27 m) wide and carries the six-lane New York State Route 104 (NY 104) from the town of Irondequoit on the west side of the bay to the town of Webster on the bay's east side. The western approach is just east of NY 104's interchange with NY 590. The bay bridge was built in 1967, has nine spans and handles an average of 67,229 vehicles per day as of 2006.

Views from the bridge are somewhat obstructed by the concrete side barriers, especially for smaller cars.

== Construction ==
Constructed between 1967 and 1969, the bridge spans Irondequoit Bay from Newport Point, Irondequoit on the western side, to Inspiration Point, Webster on the eastern shore. Some 268 piles, with 20 capped clusters, support the bridge; it is Monroe County's longest bridge. The cost at that time was $7.5 million for the bridge and $17.5 million for the highway approaches, bringing the project total to around $25 million. The bridge was opened on February 3, 1970.

Each section (truss) was built on a barge, which was then pulled into position by a tug-boat. After it was positioned, water was pumped into the pontoons of the barge to sink it enough to enable it to be moved from under the truss.

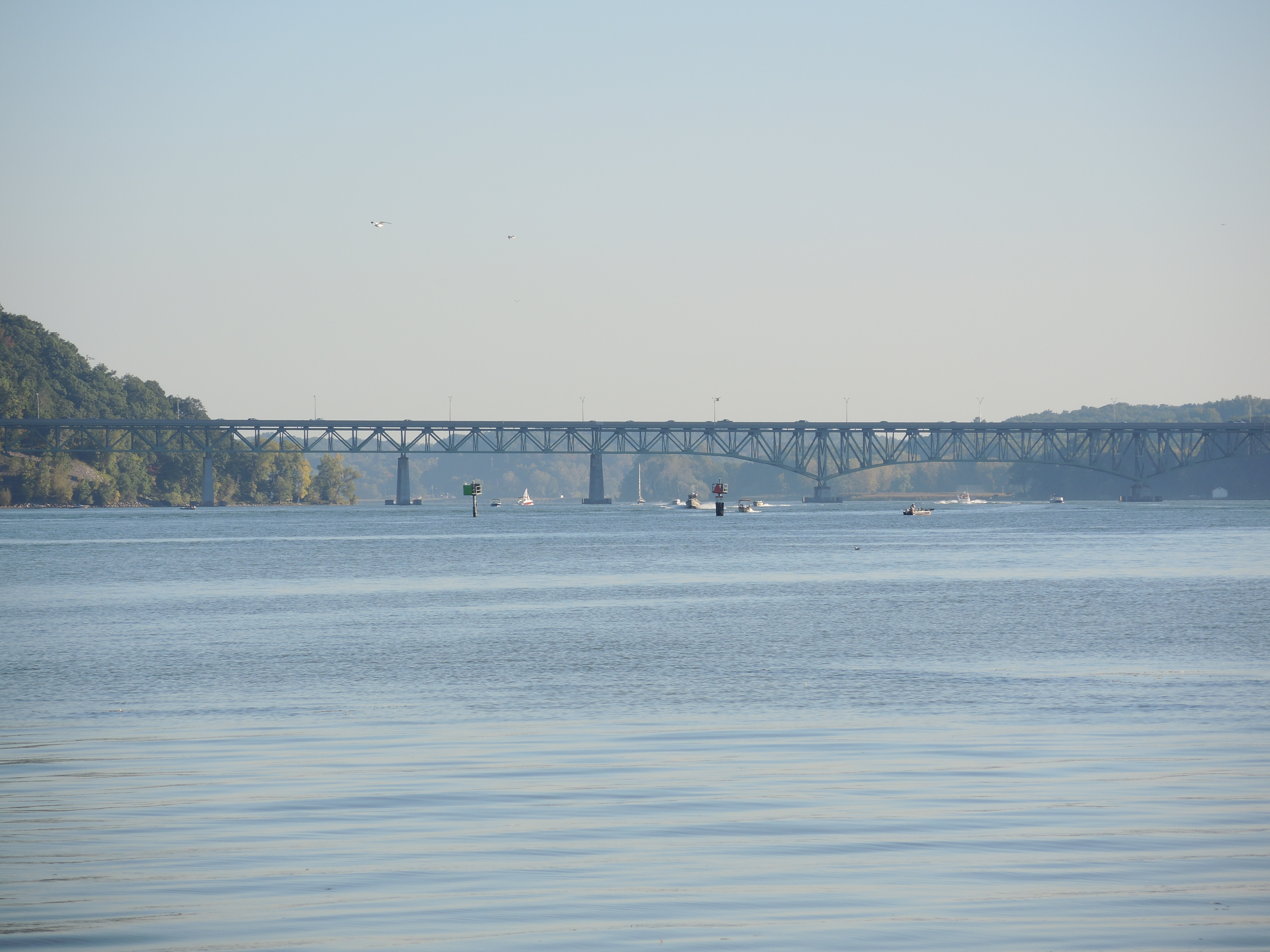
Viewed from Irondequoit Bay Marine Park, Irondequoit

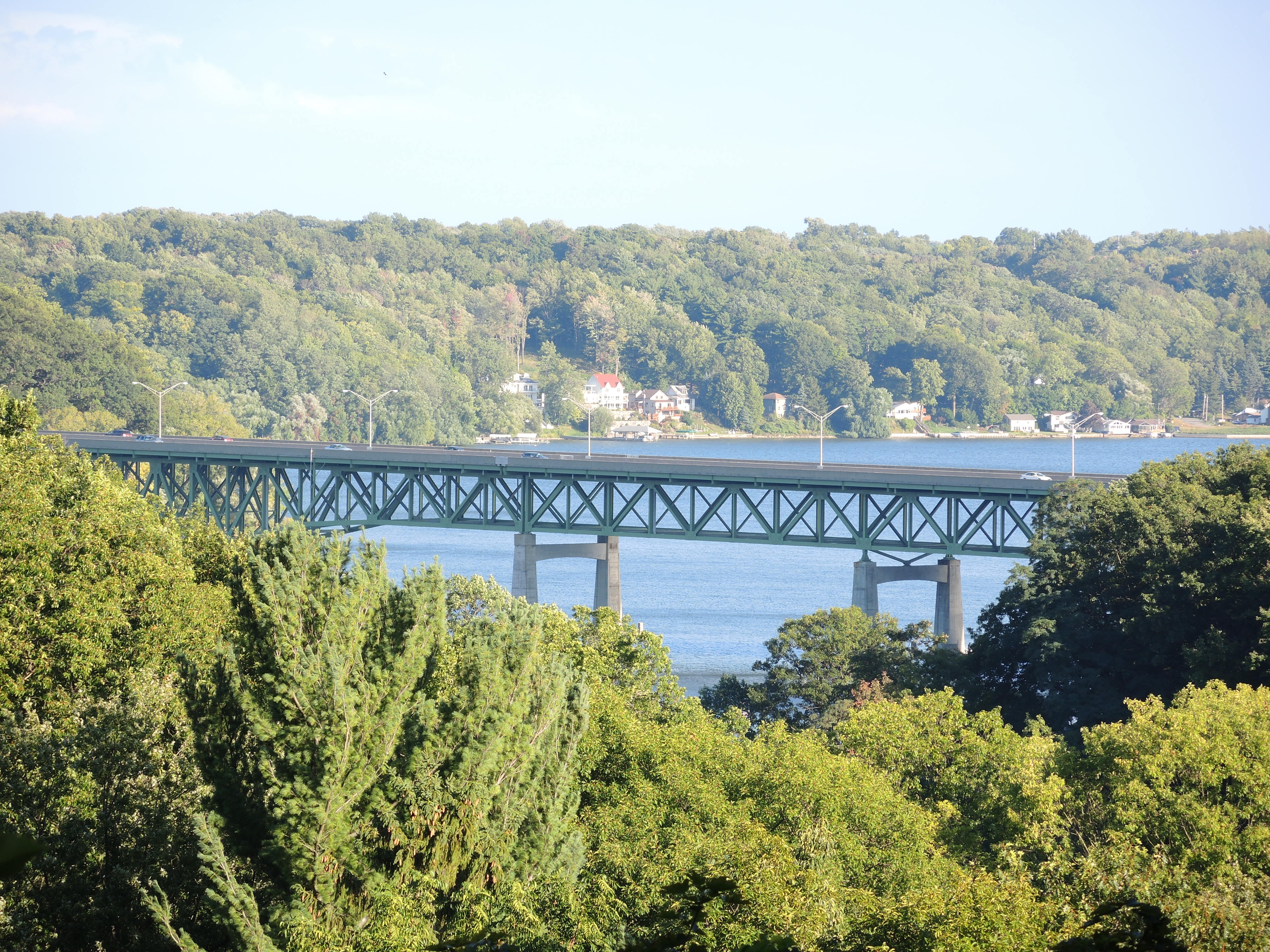
Viewed from Sea Breeze Drive, Irondequoit

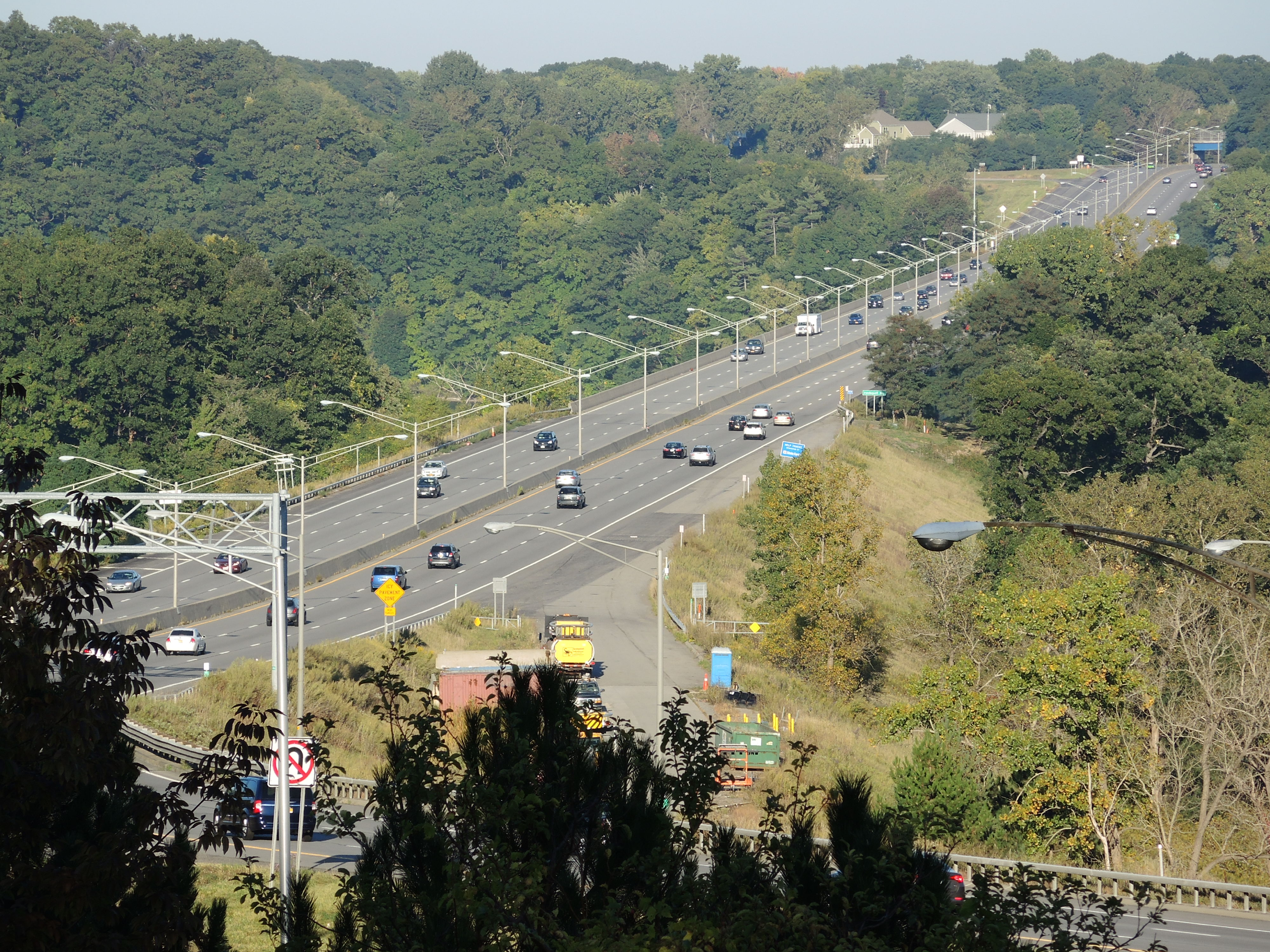
Viewed from NY-104, Irondequoit

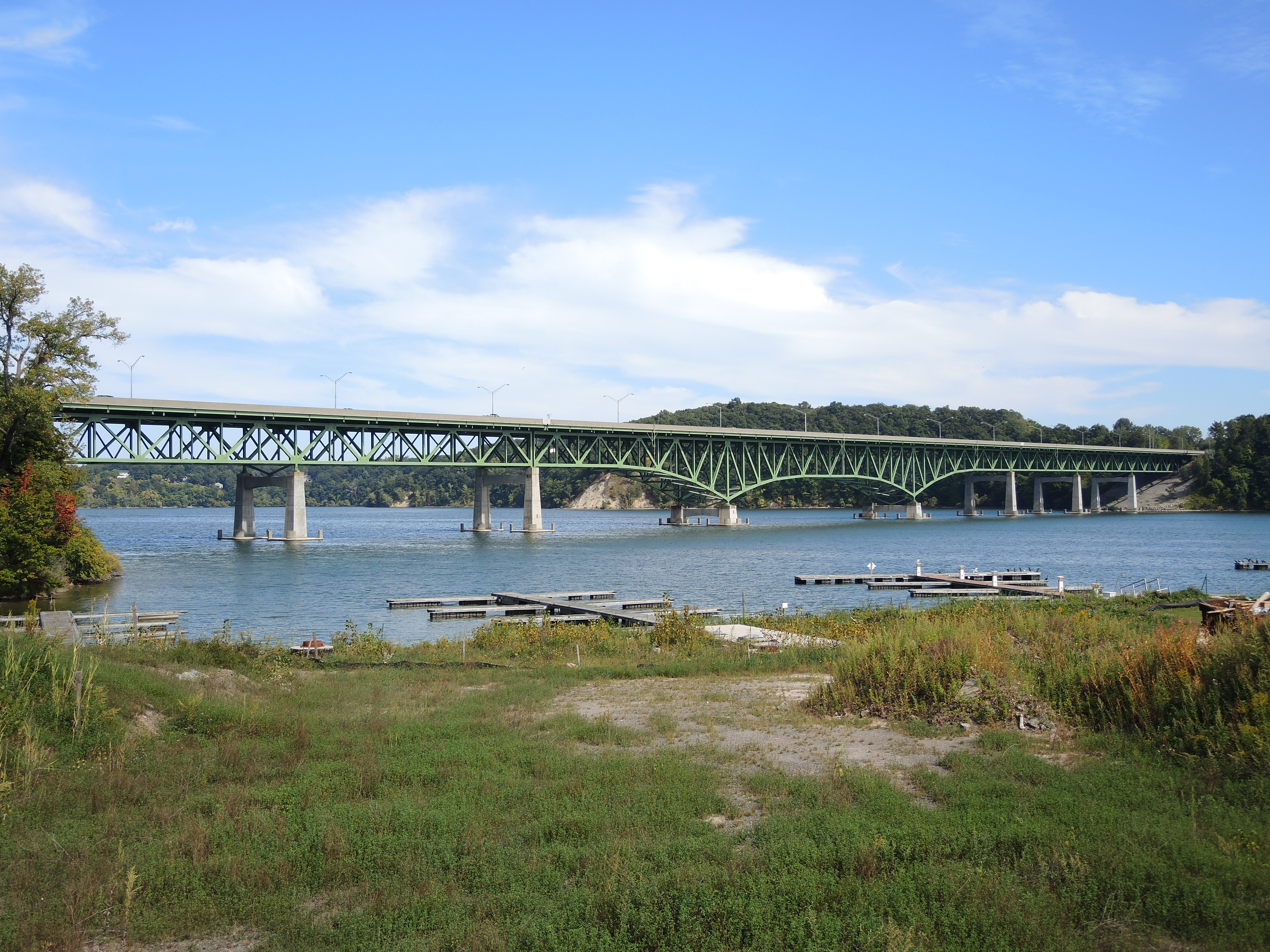
Viewed from Newport, Irondequoit

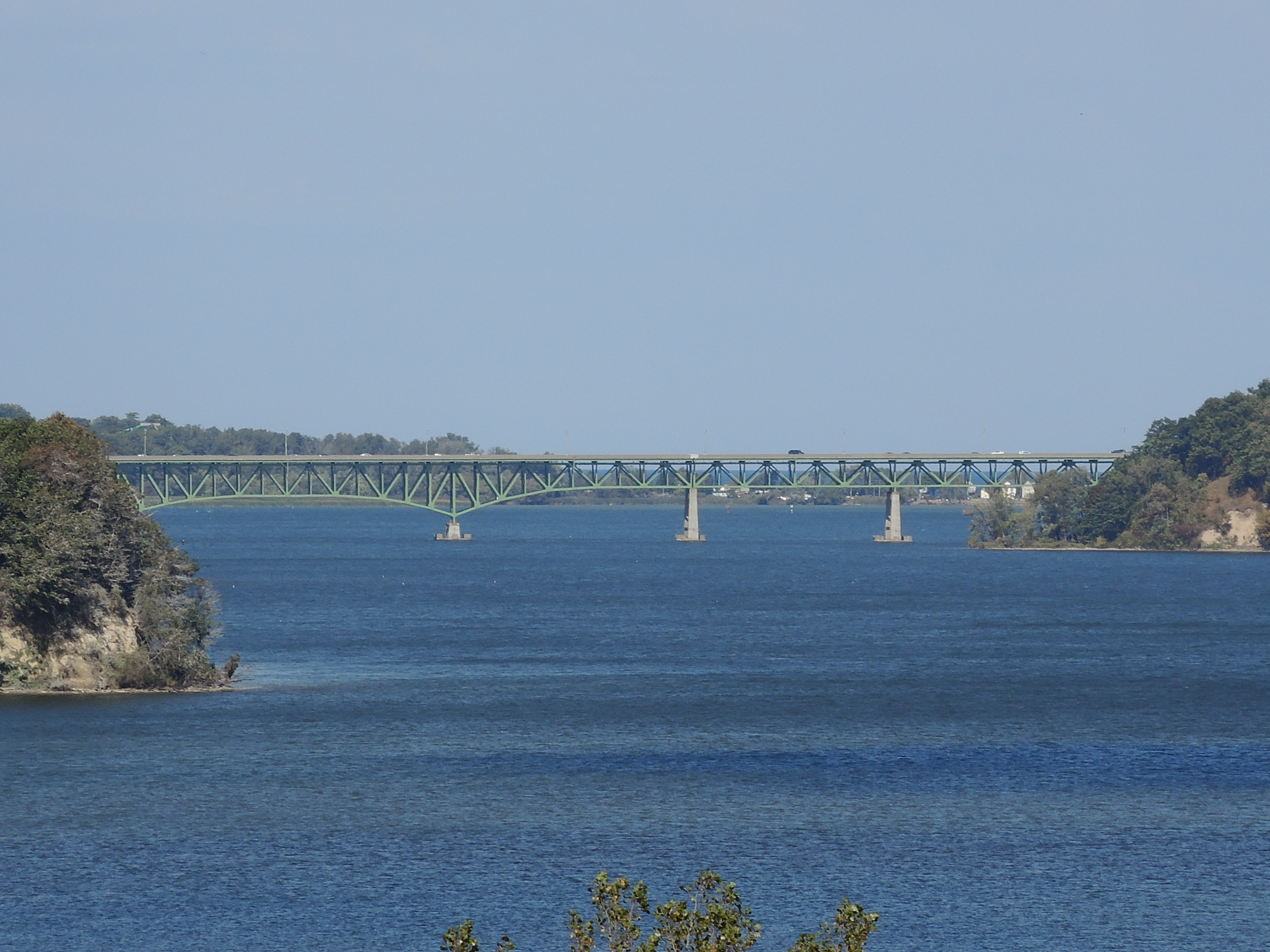
Viewed from Lucien Morin Park, Penfield

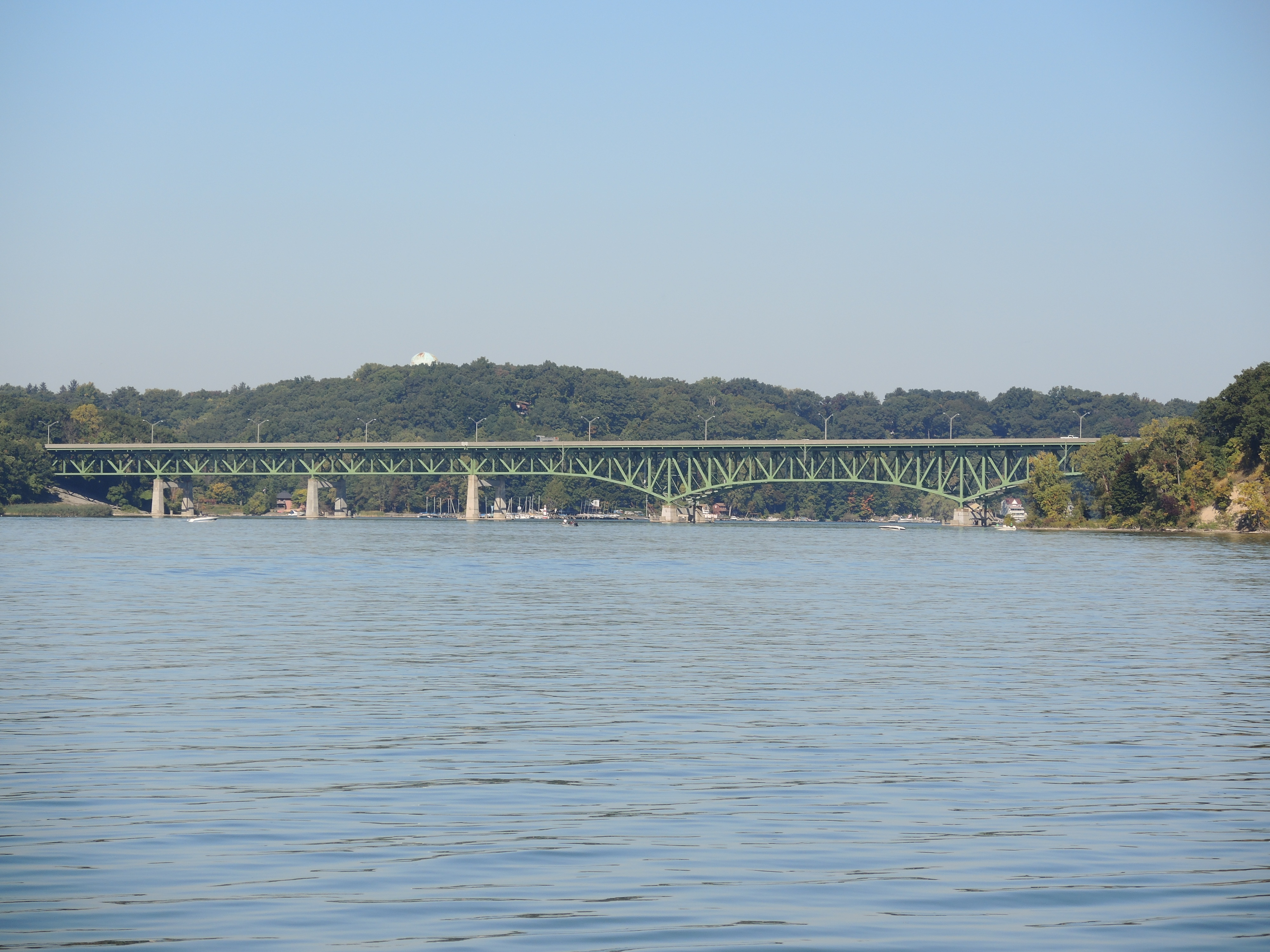
Viewed from Glen Edith, Webster

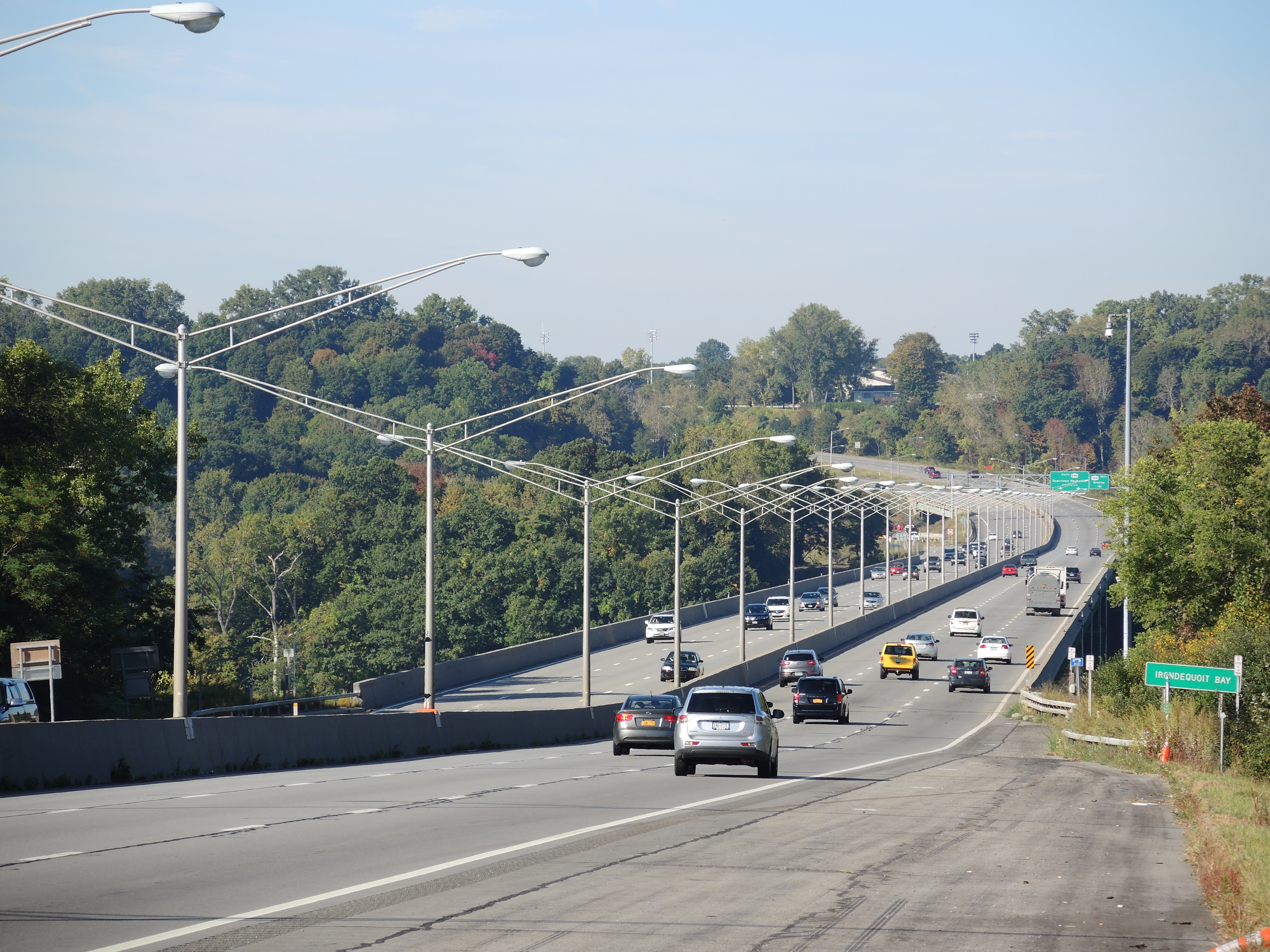
Viewed from NY-104, Webster

== Rehabilitation project and structural issues ==
Preventive maintenance activity on this bridge is meant to extend the life of the bridge by 12+ years in order to maintain the appropriate maintenance cycle.

The $14 million rehabilitation project, substantially completed July 2013, involved steel and concrete repairs, sandblasting and repainting and replacement of bridge joints. The work necessitated frequent lane closures and, for several weekends in 2012, closure of all the lanes in a given direction while the joint replacements were done.

During a biennial inspection in August 2013, a "handful" of the beams were found to be bent downward about a quarter-inch at the outer end — the end that lies at the outer edge of the right-hand lanes. "It's just ever so slight, literally the size of my pencil eraser," Maher said of the deformation. As a result of the discovery, the eastbound and westbound right-hand lanes of the Irondequoit Bay bridge were closed without notice early October 2013 and reopened in March 2014.
