= Clarkson (CDP), New York =

Clarkson, New York
- Census-designated place
- Location in Monroe County and the state of New York

- Location of New York in the United States
- Coordinates: 43°13′59″N 77°55′39″W
- Country: United States
- State: New York
- County: Monroe
- Town: Clarkson

Area
  - Total: 9.11 sq mi (23.6 km^{2})
  - Land: 9.11 sq mi (23.6 km^{2})
  - Water: 0.0 sq mi (0 km^{2})
- Elevation: 429 ft (131 m)

Population (2020)
  - Total: 4,694
  - Density: 515.3/sq mi (199.0/km^{2})
- Time zone: UTC-5 (Eastern (EST))
  - Summer (DST): UTC-4 (EDT)
- ZIP Code: 14420 (Brockport)
- Area codes: 518/838
- FIPS code: 36-15946
- GNIS feature ID: 2631645

Clarkson is an unincorporated community and census-designated place (CDP) within the town of Clarkson in Monroe County, New York, United States. The population was 4,694 at the 2020 census, out of 6,904 in the entire town of Clarkson.

== Geography ==
The Clarkson CDP is in the southern part of the town of Clarkson, centered on the intersection of State Routes 19 and 104. The CDP is bordered to the south by the village of Brockport and the town of Sweden. Route 19 (Lake Road) leads north 5 miles (8 km) to Hamlin and 8.5 miles (13.7 km) to its terminus at Lake Ontario, while to the south it leads through Brockport and continues to Bergen, 10 miles (16 km) away. Route 104 (Ridge Road) leads east 16 miles (26 km) to the northern part of Rochester and west 60 miles (97 km) to Lewiston at the Niagara River. State Route 260 (Sweden-Walker Road) forms the eastern border of the Clarkson CDP and leads north 8.5 miles (13.7 km) to Lake Ontario and south 2 miles (3 km) to Route 31 in Sweden.

According to the U.S. Census Bureau, the Clarkson CDP has an area of 9.1 square miles (23.6 km^{2}), all land. The area is drained to the north by Brockport Creek, part of the Salmon Creek watershed flowing to Lake Ontario.

== Demographics ==
Historical population
Census	Pop.	Note	%±
2010	4,358		—
2020	4,694		7.7%
U.S. Decennial Census
