= New York State Route 104 =

Highway in New York

New York State Route 104
- NY 104 highlighted in red

Route information
- Maintained by NYSDOT and the city of Niagara Falls
- Length: 182.41 mi (293.56 km)
- Existed: June 1971–present
- Tourist routes: Great Lakes Seaway Trail

Major junctions
- West end: NY 384 / Highway 420 on the Rainbow Bridge at the Canadian border in Niagara Falls
- US 62 in Niagara Falls; I-190 / NY 265 in Lewiston; NY 78 near Lockport; NY 98 near Albion; NY 390 in Greece; NY 590 in Irondequoit; NY 14 near Sodus; NY 481 in Oswego; I-81 in Mexico
- East end: NY 13 in Williamstown

Location
- Country: United States
- State: New York
- Counties: Niagara, Orleans, Monroe, Wayne, Cayuga, Oswego

Highway system
- New York Highways; Interstate; US; State; Reference; Parkways
← NY 103	→ NY 104A

New York State Route 104 (NY 104) is a 182.41-mile-long (293.56 km) east–west state highway in Upstate New York in the United States. It spans six counties and enters the vicinity of four cities—Niagara Falls, Lockport, Rochester, and Oswego—as it follows a routing largely parallel to the southern shoreline of Lake Ontario, along a ridge of the old shoreline of Glacial Lake Iroquois. The western terminus of NY 104 is an intersection with NY 384 in Niagara Falls, Niagara County, while its eastern terminus is a junction with NY 13 in the town of Williamstown, Oswego County. The portion of NY 104 between Rochester and the village of Webster east of the city is a freeway known as the Keeler Street Expressway west of NY 590 and the Irondequoit–Wayne County Expressway east of NY 590; from Williamson to Oswego, NY 104 is a super two highway.

The majority of Ridge Road and modern NY 104 from the village of Red Creek to the town of Mexico were originally designated as part of Route 30, an unsigned legislative route, early in the 20th century. All of Ridge Road and its continuation through Oswego to the hamlet of Maple View gained a signed designation by 1926 and became part of U.S. Route 104 (US 104), a United States Numbered Highway extending from Niagara Falls to Maple View, c. 1935. US 104, which never connected to US 4, its implied parent route, was redesignated as NY 104 in June 1971. As part of the redesignation, NY 104 was extended east to NY 13 in Williamstown over what had been New York State Route 126.

The 104 designation, whether it be US 104 or NY 104, has shifted from surface streets to freeway and super twos, particularly from Rochester east to Oswego. The first such realignment occurred in the 1940s in Wayne County and was completed by the realignment of NY 104 onto the Irondequoit–Wayne County Expressway near Webster in the 1980s.

== Route description ==
=== Niagara County ===
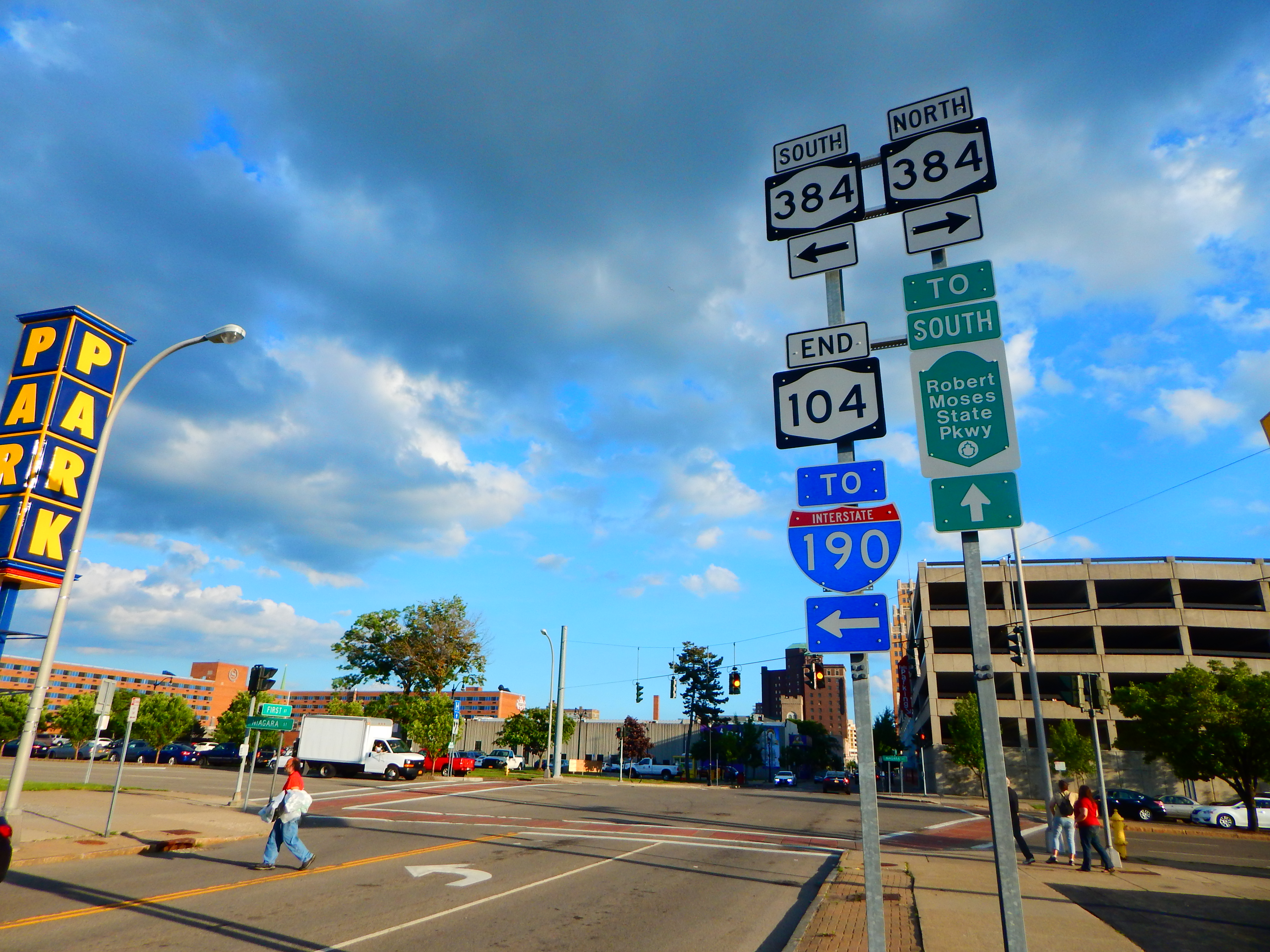
Western terminus of NY 104 at NY 384 in Niagara Falls

NY 104 begins at the Rainbow Bridge in Niagara Falls. The Seaway Trail crosses NY 384 and follows NY 104 north on First Street for one block to the Niagara Scenic Parkway, where the byway and NY 104 veer onto Main Street. NY 104 follows Main Street through the city's largely commercial west side and intersects the northern or eastern terminus for US 62 (Ferry Avenue and Walnut Avenue) and US 62 Business (Pine Avenue). North of US 62 Business, the area becomes more residential as NY 104 meets NY 182 southeast of the Whirlpool Rapids Bridge. To the north, NY 104's name changes to Lewiston Road as it passes the south campus of Niagara University. Near the northern extent of the campus, NY 104 intersects the western terminus of NY 31, here named College Avenue. At the city limits, NY 104 meets the northbound Niagara Scenic Parkway by way of a half-interchange. The portion of NY 104 between Third Street and the Lewiston town line is maintained by the city of Niagara Falls, and is the only part of NY 104 that is not maintained by the New York State Department of Transportation.

Now in the town of Lewiston, NY 104 comes within view of the Niagara River gorge and begins to run along its eastern rim. NY 104 meets the northernmost point of NY 61 at the northern campus of Niagara University. Past NY 61, the route passes by the Niagara Power Visitors Center and over the Robert Moses Niagara Power Plant. On the opposite side of the plant, NY 104 connects with Interstate 190 (I-190) at exit 25 via Upper Mountain Road and passes under the eastern approach to the Lewiston–Queenston Bridge, which links I-190 with Ontario's Highway 405.

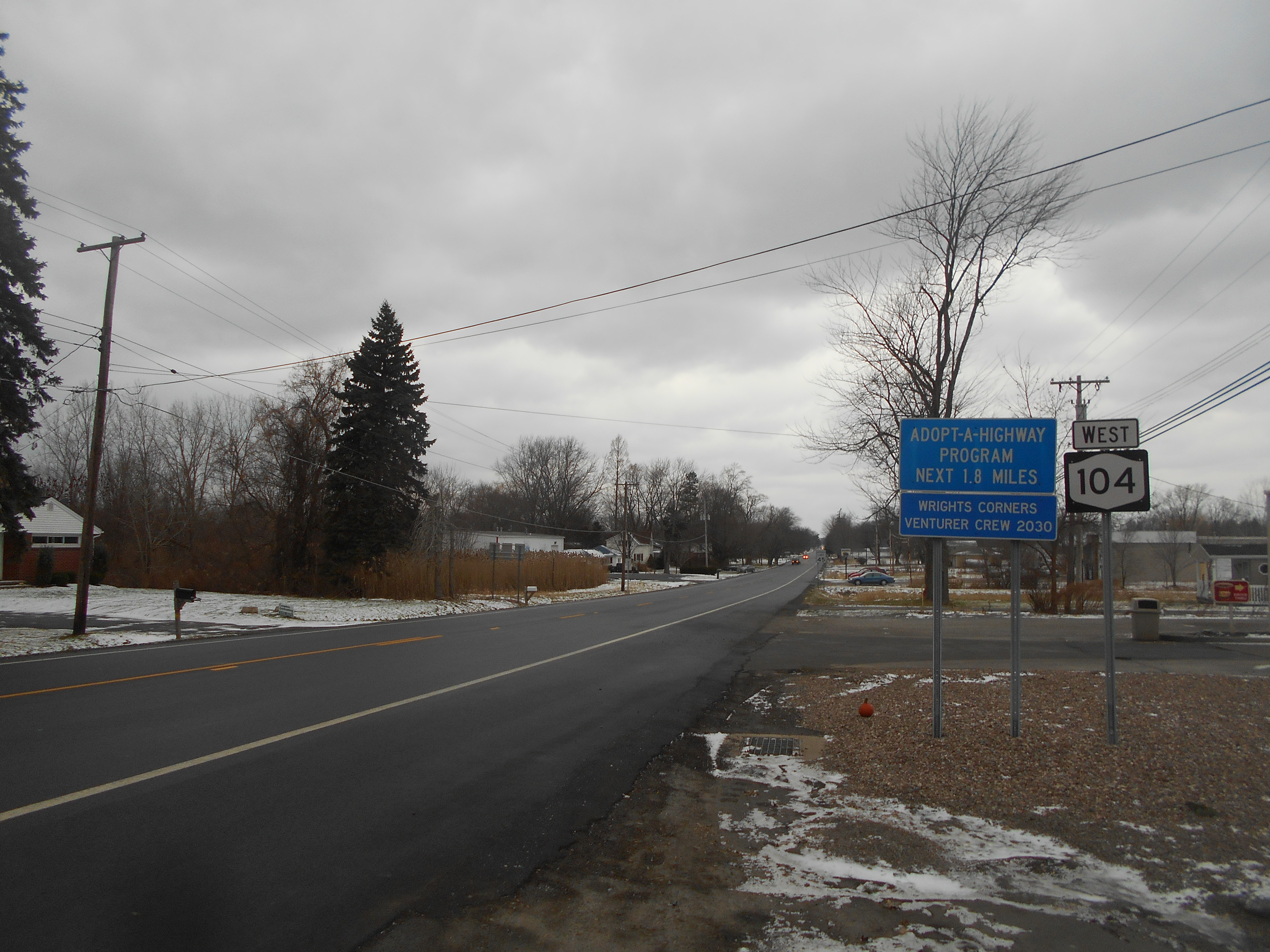
NY 104 heading westward from NY 78 in Newfane

Past I-190, NY 104 begins to deviate from the Niagara River. It heads through a small neighborhood situated between the Moses Parkway and NY 104 and intersects the northern end of NY 265. North of this junction, NY 104 curves northeast to descend the Niagara Escarpment. As it heads downward in elevation, it intersects the western terminus of NY 18 by way of an interchange. As part of the same exit, NY 104 meets the parkway one more time as well as the southern terminus of NY 18F near the village of Lewiston. Here, the Seaway Trail leaves NY 104 to follow NY 18F. East of the exit, NY 104 intersects NY 18 again by way of another interchange.

East of Lewiston village, NY 104 follows Ridge Road through a sparsely populated area of Niagara County. Much of this portion of NY 104 is bordered on its southern end by the Tuscarora Indian Reservation. At the Lewiston hamlet of Dickersonville, the extents of the reservation head south, and development along NY 104 increases slightly. NY 104 meets the northern terminus of NY 429 at the Lewiston–Cambria town line and crosses over NY 425 at Streeters Corners. Just east of this location is an intersection with NY 93 in the community of Molyneaux Corners. The two routes form a concurrency east to Warrens Corners, a hamlet on the Cambria–Lockport town line, where NY 93 turns south to serve the city of Lockport.

NY 104 heads northeast through the extreme northwest corner of the town of Lockport to the town line, where it turns eastward to straddle the boundary between the towns of Lockport and Newfane. As it approaches the hamlet of Wrights Corners, the development along NY 104 increases substantially with the level peaking at the junction of NY 104 and NY 78. The two routes join for roughly 0.35 miles (0.56 km) into the town of Newfane before splitting north of the hamlet. Ridge Road continues northeast through a residential district, which gives way to open fields once more at Ridgewood. NY 104 turns east here, passing through the town of Hartland and intersecting the southern terminus of NY 148 and the northern terminus of NY 271. The route crosses into Orleans County at a junction with the southern terminus of NY 269, which straddles the county line.

=== Orleans and Monroe counties ===
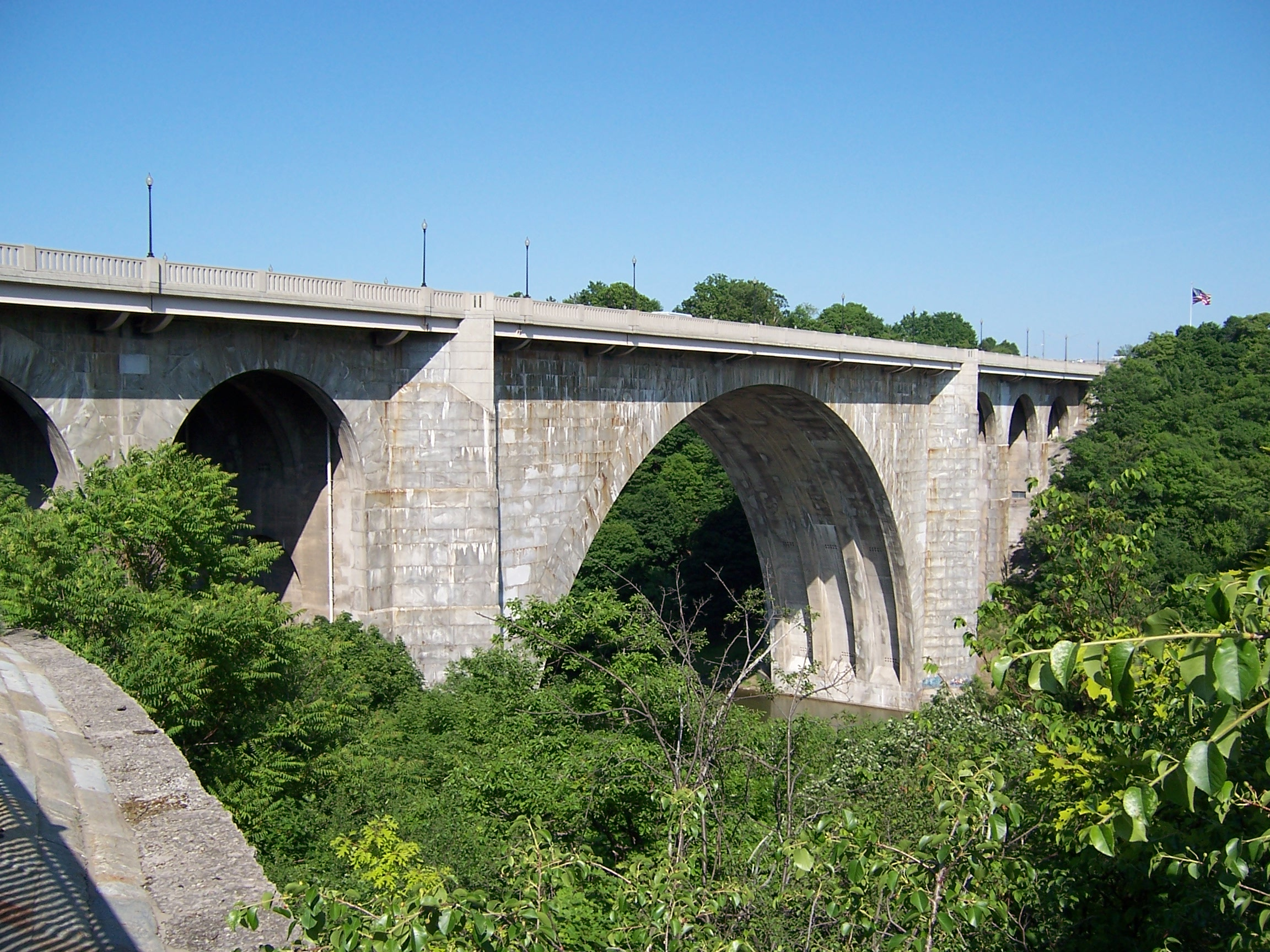
The Veterans Memorial Bridge over the Genesee River.

The route heads northeast through the town of Ridgeway to the hamlet of the same name, where NY 104 meets NY 63. NY 63 joins NY 104 east along Ridge Road for about 300 yards (270 m) before continuing north toward Lake Ontario. NY 104, meanwhile, continues through the rural towns of Ridgeway and Gaines to a junction with NY 279 north of Albion. Not far to the east, NY 104 intersects NY 98, the primary north–south highway through Albion, in the hamlet of Childs. Just past the intersection on the north side of the road are two of the three cobblestone buildings of the Cobblestone Historic District, a National Historic Landmark.

Farther east, Ridge Road enters the town of Murray, where it meets the northern terminus of NY 387 and intersects NY 237 in the hamlet of Murray. The two routes join for just under a mile (1.6 km) before NY 237 breaks away to the south toward Holley. NY 104 exits Orleans County 2 miles (3.2 km) later in the same fashion as it entered: by intersecting a state highway. After meeting the southern terminus of NY 272, NY 104 crosses into Monroe County and becomes West Ridge Road as it heads through the town of Clarkson. In the densely populated hamlet of Clarkson Corners, NY 104 intersects NY 19. The open fields return east of the hamlet, and largely surround Ridge Road as NY 104 intersects NY 260. NY 104 heads onward into Parma, where it widens to four lanes and has a junction with NY 259 in Parma Corners.

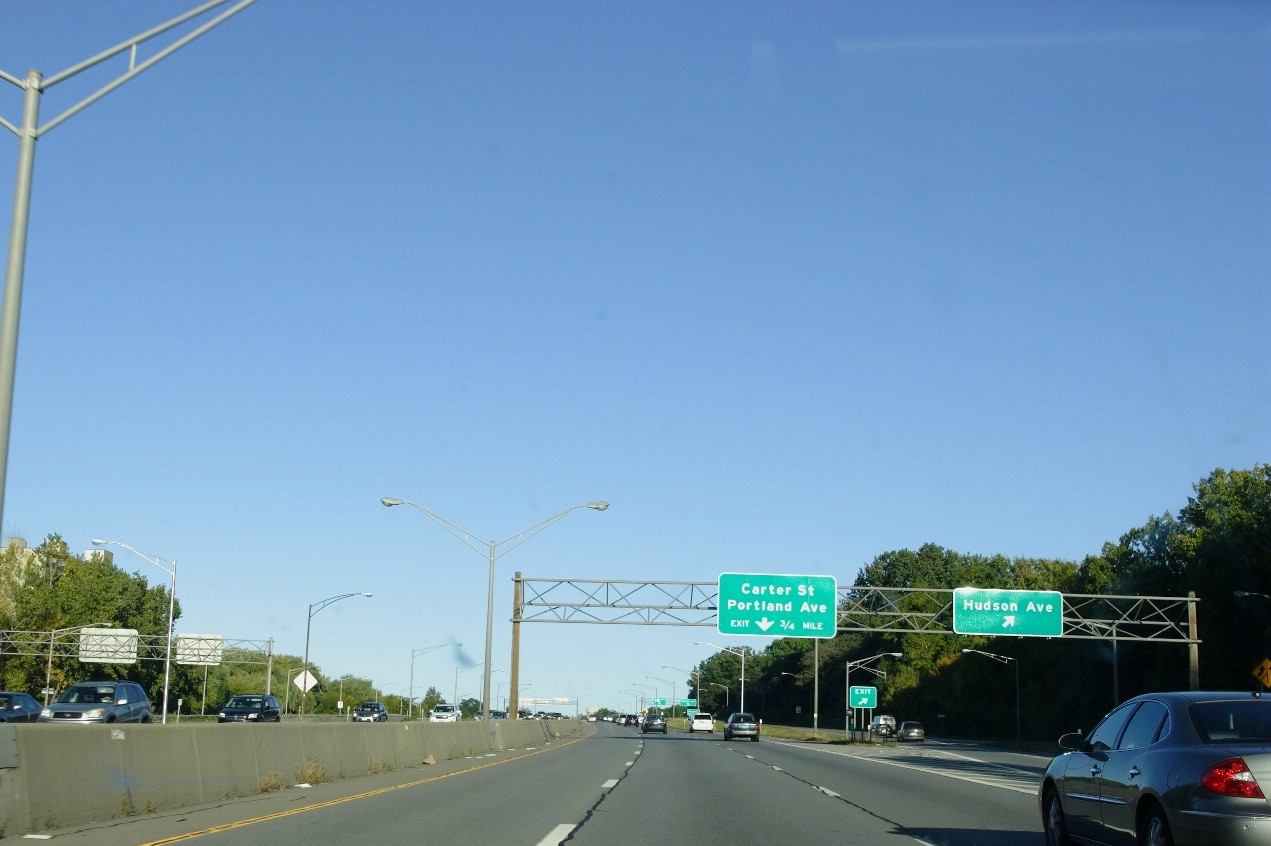
Keeler Street Expressway (NY 104) eastbound at Hudson Avenue

East of Parma Corners, development on NY 104 steadily increases as it heads toward the town of Greece. By the Parma–Greece town line, where NY 104 intersects the southern terminus of NY 261, Ridge Road is lined with commercial properties of varying size. Continuing east, NY 104 meets the northern terminus of NY 386. Here, NY 104 widens to a six-lane divided highway. Between NY 386 and NY 390 exit 24, NY 104 passes by several large shopping malls, the largest of which is The Mall at Greece Ridge at the intersection of NY 104 and Long Pond Road. At NY 390, NY 104 continues to be a six-lane divided highway as it heads toward Rochester. It enters the city limits upon meeting Mount Read Boulevard at an interchange.

In Rochester, NY 104 passes through an area known as Kodak Park, the large industrial complex owned by Eastman Kodak that occupies an entire neighborhood. In the middle of the complex, NY 104 crosses the Rochester and Southern Railroad and the CSX Transportation-owned Charlotte Running Track and intersects the eastern terminus of NY 18. Continuing east, NY 104 crosses the Genesee River gorge on the Veterans Memorial Bridge. On the opposite bank, it loses the name West Ridge Road and becomes a limited-access highway known as the Keeler Street Expressway.

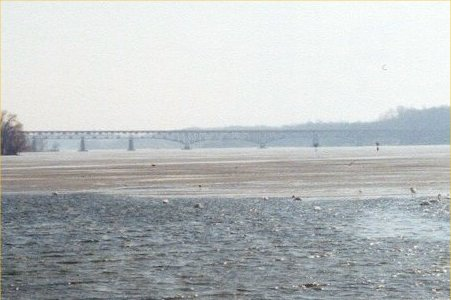
The Irondequoit Bay Bridge carries NY 104 from Irondequoit to Webster.

North of the first exit with St. Paul Street, Ridge Road resurfaces as East Ridge Road, which parallels the expressway to the north. NY 104 continues through Rochester and Irondequoit, connecting to North Clinton Avenue, Seneca Avenue, Hudson Avenue, Carter Street, Portland Avenue, North Goodman Street and Culver Road by way of interchanges. Between the Goodman Street and Culver Road exits, NY 104 passes the former Medley Centre. East of Culver, NY 104 encounters NY 590 and connects to NY 590 southbound by way of an interchange. East Ridge Road runs through the middle of this interchange, although there are no connections between Ridge and NY 104. There is also no access from NY 104 eastbound to NY 590 northbound; eastbound traffic must take Culver Road in order to go north toward Sea Breeze. Just east of the NY 590 interchange, NY 104 becomes the Irondequoit–Wayne County Expressway and crosses the Irondequoit Bay by way of the Irondequoit Bay Bridge. An access road between NY 104 just west of the bridge and NY 590 at Titus Avenue was once planned. Although entrance and exit ramps were built for the connection along NY 104, the rest of the link was never built, leaving no access from NY 104 westbound to NY 590 northbound and from NY 590 southbound to NY 104 eastbound.

On the other side of the bridge in the town of Webster, NY 104 has exits leading to Bay Road, Five Mile Line Road, Hard Road, and Holt Road prior to entering the village of Webster. Within the village, NY 104 meets NY 250 (North Avenue) and Phillips Road by way of interchanges before exiting the village. The expressway loosely parallels the southern edge of the primary Xerox campus to an exit with Salt Road, where it downgrades to a divided highway as it continues east to Basket Road and the Monroe–Wayne county line, partially delimited by NY 404.

=== Wayne and Cayuga counties ===
As Ridge Road follows to the south, NY 104 continues east through Ontario, where it meets the northern terminus of NY 350 in Ontario Center. The four-lane divided highway continues east to Williamson, where the median separating the two directions of NY 104 comes to an end west of the hamlet of Williamson. In the center of the hamlet, NY 104 intersects the northern terminus of NY 21. NY 104 narrows to two lanes east of Williamson as development along the route declines once more, giving way to open fields and thick forests.

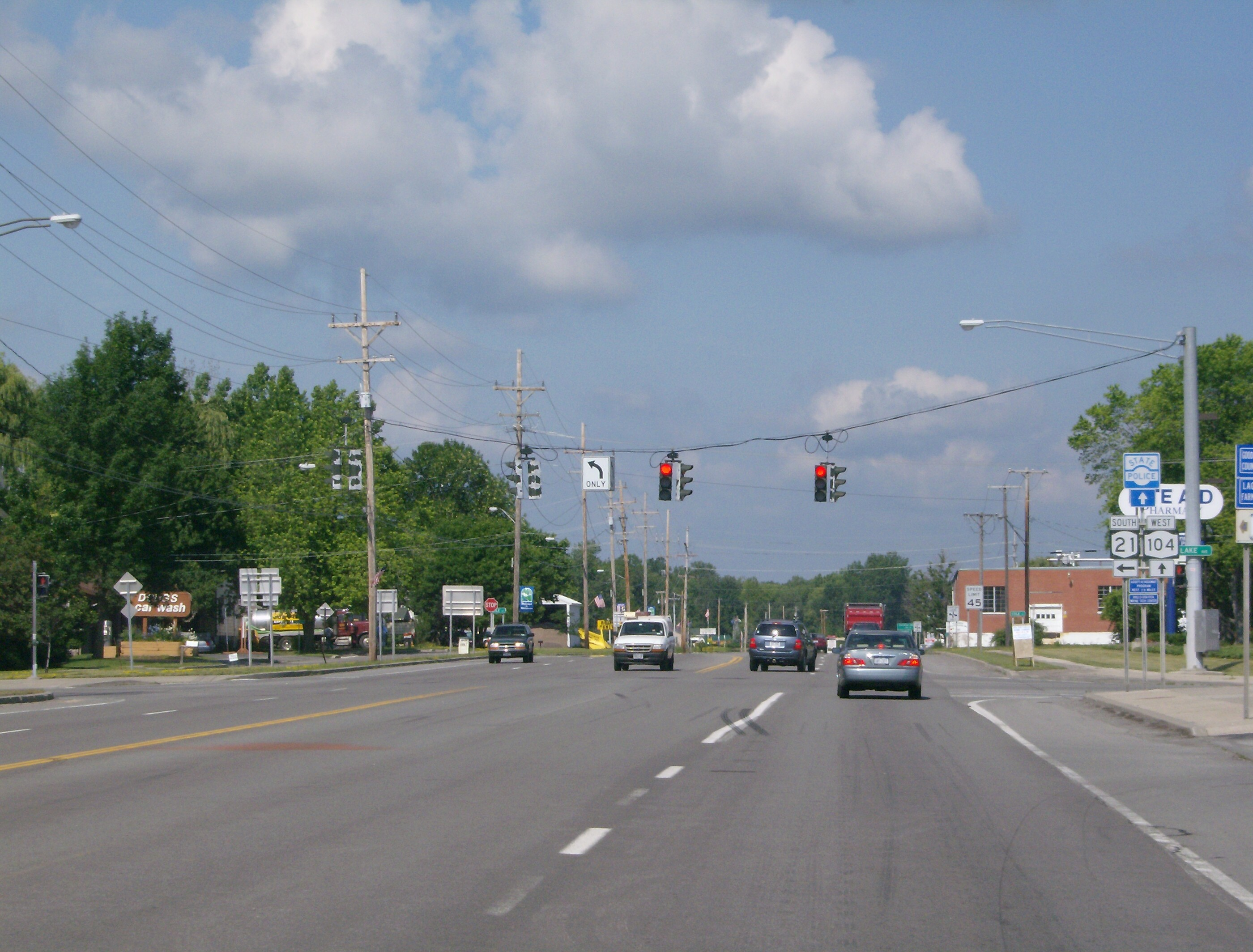
NY 104 at the northern terminus of NY 21 in Williamson

Near the center of the county in the town of Sodus, NY 104 serves as the northern terminus of NY 88 northwest of the village of Sodus. While NY 88 heads east into the village, NY 104 bypasses Sodus to the north. East of the village, Ridge Road and NY 104 intersect as Ridge Road flips to the north side of NY 104. The two highways follow parallel routings southeast toward Alton, where NY 104 intersects NY 14. East of Alton, the gap between the two widens as Ridge Road veers north to access Sodus Bay. NY 104, meanwhile, follows a nearly linear routing into the town of Huron, where it intersects the northern terminus of NY 414.

NY 104 continues on the eastward routing to the vicinity of the village of Wolcott, where it connects to the northern terminus of NY 89 via a half-diamond interchange south of the village. Northeast of this location in the town of Wolcott, Ridge Road intersects NY 104 once again, returning to the south side of the route. The two roads follow parallel routings once more to a junction south of Red Creek. At this rural intersection, NY 104 acts as the southern and northern (western) terminus of both NY 104A and NY 370, respectively, both occupying an extension of Ridge Road. Just east of the intersection is the Wayne–Cayuga county line. Only 7 miles (11 km) of the route are situated in Cayuga County, and the only junction of note within the county is with NY 38, which it meets in the Sterling hamlet of Martville. East of the junction, NY 104 turns sharply to the northeast and enters Oswego County.

=== Oswego County ===
The route continues northeast through the town of Hannibal to the village of the same name. Instead of entering the community, NY 104 bypasses it to the east. It intersects NY 3 east of Hannibal and heads north toward Lake Ontario. In the town of Oswego, NY 104 meets the northern terminus of NY 104A and assumes its northeasterly routing. It is here that the Seaway Trail rejoins NY 104. NY 104 heads along the Lake Ontario shoreline to the lake-side city of Oswego, the first location with significant development along the route since Williamson. The route intersects Sweet Road, a connector leading to the campus of SUNY Oswego, just west of the city limits.

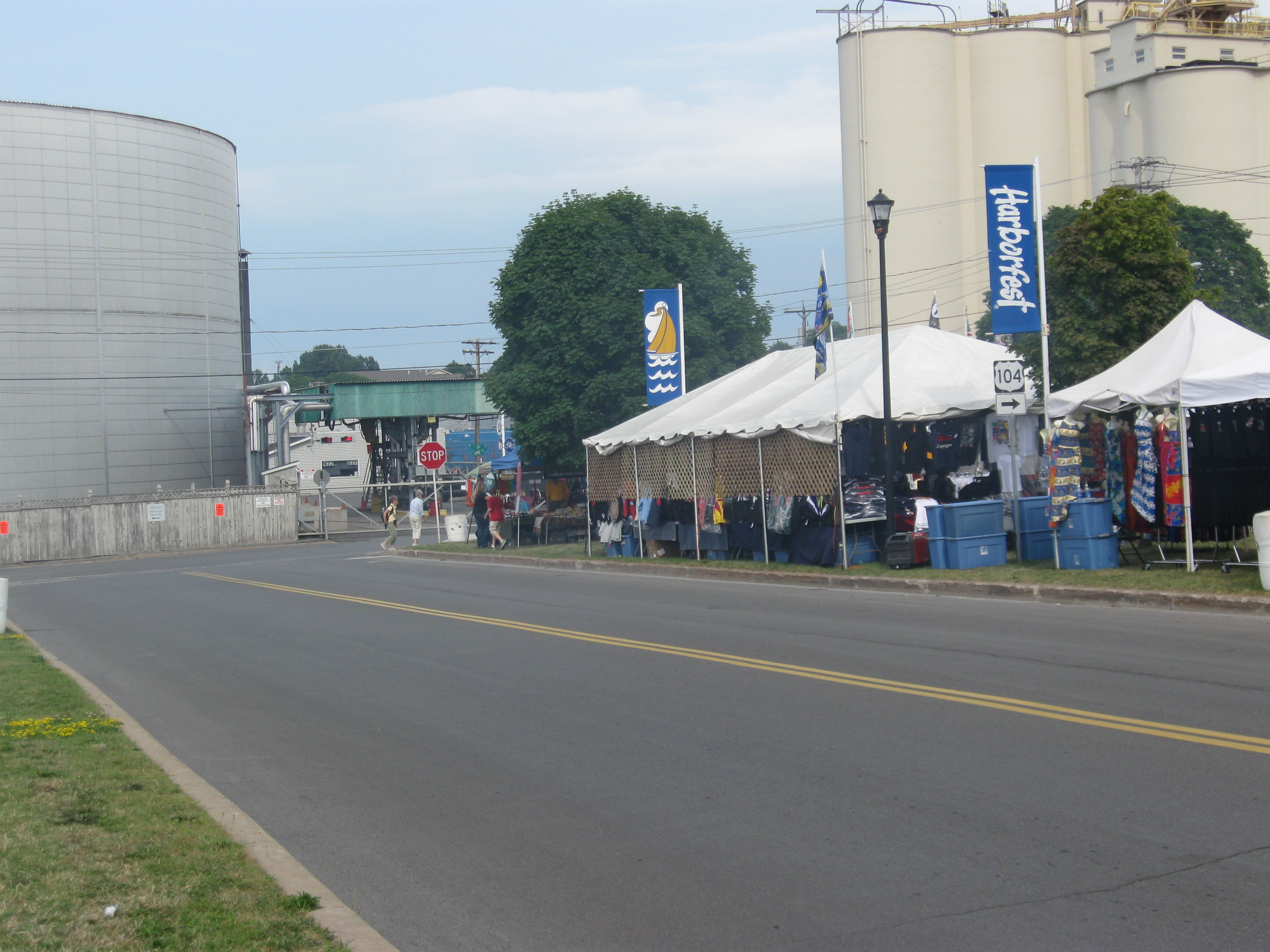
An old "To US 104" shield on Lake Street in Oswego.

NY 104 enters the city as the two-laned West Seneca Street. At Baylis Street, the road widens to four lanes separated by a median. After seven blocks, NY 104 veers onto West Bridge Street, a four-lane street with no median. NY 104 continues along Bridge Street into downtown, where it intersects the northern terminus of NY 48 on the west bank of the Oswego River and the northern terminus of NY 481 on the east bank. As NY 104 heads through eastern Oswego, it separates from East Bridge Street and curves east to follow a more inland routing. The route reverts to two lanes as it exits the city limits.

The high level of development along NY 104 continues to the Scriba hamlet of the same name, where it begins to become more sporadic and give way to fields and dense forests. NY 104 heads northeast to New Haven and the western terminus of NY 104B. While NY 104B heads northeast toward the lake shore as part of the Seaway Trail, NY 104 cuts southeast to serve the village of Mexico. In the village center, NY 104 briefly overlaps NY 3 and intersects the western terminus of NY 69. The route continues due east through the rural town of Mexico to the small hamlet of Maple View, centered around the junction between NY 104 and US 11. Just outside the hamlet, NY 104 meets I-81 at exit 34. Past I-81, NY 104 heads east and southeast for nine miles (14 km) through the predominantly rural towns of Albion and Williamstown to its eastern terminus at a junction with NY 13.

== History ==
=== Early designations ===
U.S. Route 104
- Location: Niagara Falls–Maple View
- Existed: 1935–June 1971

In 1908, the New York State Legislature established Route 30, an unsigned legislative route extending from Niagara Falls, Niagara County in the southwest to Rouses Point, Clinton County, in the northeast. From Rochester to Red Creek, Route 30 was assigned to Ridge Road. Between Red Creek and the hamlet of Union Square (now Maple View) in the town of Mexico, it included most of modern NY 104. At the same time, the roadway alongside the Niagara River between Ridge Road in Lewiston and Pine Avenue in downtown Niagara Falls was designated, but not signed, as part of Route 18. By 1914, Route 30 was amended to also include the section of Ridge Road from Porter (modern NY 429) to Ridgeway (NY 63). In 1914, another section—from Ridgeway to the Orleans–Monroe county line—was also included in Route 30's definition as a spur route. The spur route became part of Route 30 on March 1, 1921, when the mainline route was realigned to follow Ridge Road between Ridgeway and Rochester.

When the first set of posted routes in New York were assigned in 1924, the segments of Route 30 from Rochester to Red Creek and from Oswego to Maple View became part of NY 3. Between Red Creek and Oswego, NY 3 was routed on what is now NY 104A. Farther west, the portion of Route 18 from Niagara Falls to Lewiston was included as part of NY 34. By 1926, all of legislative Route 30 west of Rochester was designated as part of NY 31. In the late 1920s, however, NY 31 was realigned to follow Ridge Road west from Porter to Lewiston. In the 1930 renumbering of state highways in New York, NY 34 became part of an extended NY 18 while New York State Route 3E was assigned to the portion of former legislative Route 30 between Red Creek and Oswego. NY 3E was renumbered to New York State Route 3F c. 1932.

=== Establishment of US 104 ===
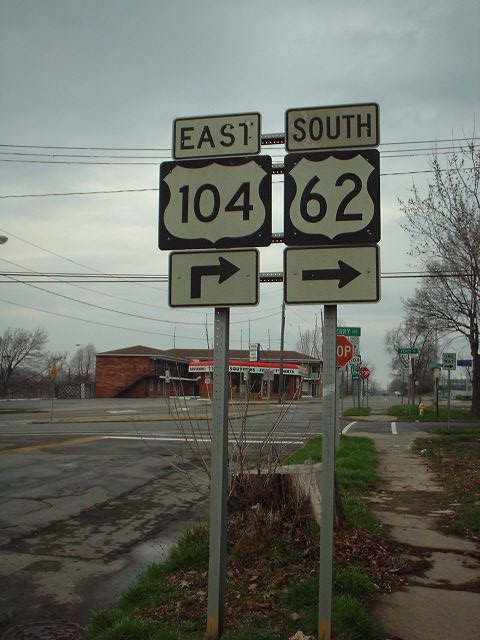
Sign assembly for US 62 and US 104 in Niagara Falls. US 104 had long since been redesignated as NY 104 by the time of this photo.

US 104 was assigned across Upstate New York in April 1935, extending from Niagara Falls to Maple View via Lewiston, Rochester, and Oswego. It overlapped NY 18 from Niagara Falls to Lewiston and replaced NY 3 and NY 31 from Lewiston to Maple View (except from Red Creek to Oswego, where US 104 followed NY 3F instead). As a result, NY 31 was shifted south onto most of its modern alignment while NY 3 was rerouted south of Watertown to follow what had been NY 3D. Although US 104 was technically a child route of US 4, it did not connect to US 4. A highway extending eastward from US 11 and US 104 at Maple View to NY 13 in Williamstown was designated as NY 126 c. 1940.

When it was first assigned, US 104 dipped south to serve downtown Rochester instead of bypassing it to the north. US 104 left Ridge Road at Lake Avenue and followed Lake Avenue and State Street south to Main Street in downtown. It followed Main Street and Winton Road to Empire Boulevard, where it turned east to rejoin Ridge Road in Webster. It was rerouted c. 1937 to continue east on Ridge Road over the Veterans Memorial Bridge and through Irondequoit to Culver Road. US 104 turned here, following Culver Road south to Empire Boulevard and the latter east to Winton Road, where it reconnected to its original routing through the city. The realignment created a significant overlap with NY 18, which joined US 104 in the vicinity of Kodak Park and separated at Culver Road, where it headed north instead.

=== Conversion to expressways ===
Work began in the 1940s on new super two alignments for US 104 in Wayne, Cayuga, and Oswego counties. The new highway was built on a routing parallel to that of Ridge Road and served as a bypass of the communities along Ridge Road. The first portion of the super two, extending from the Monroe–Wayne county line at Union Hill to west of Sodus, was built in the mid-1940s and completed by 1947. An extension of the highway around Sodus to NY 414 in Huron was constructed in the mid-1960s and opened by 1968. In between the end of the super two and Ridge Road, US 104 was routed on Lake Bluff Road. The remainder of the super two between Huron and Red Creek was finished by 1974. East of the super two, a bypass was constructed around the village of Hannibal during the early 1960s and opened to traffic by 1964.

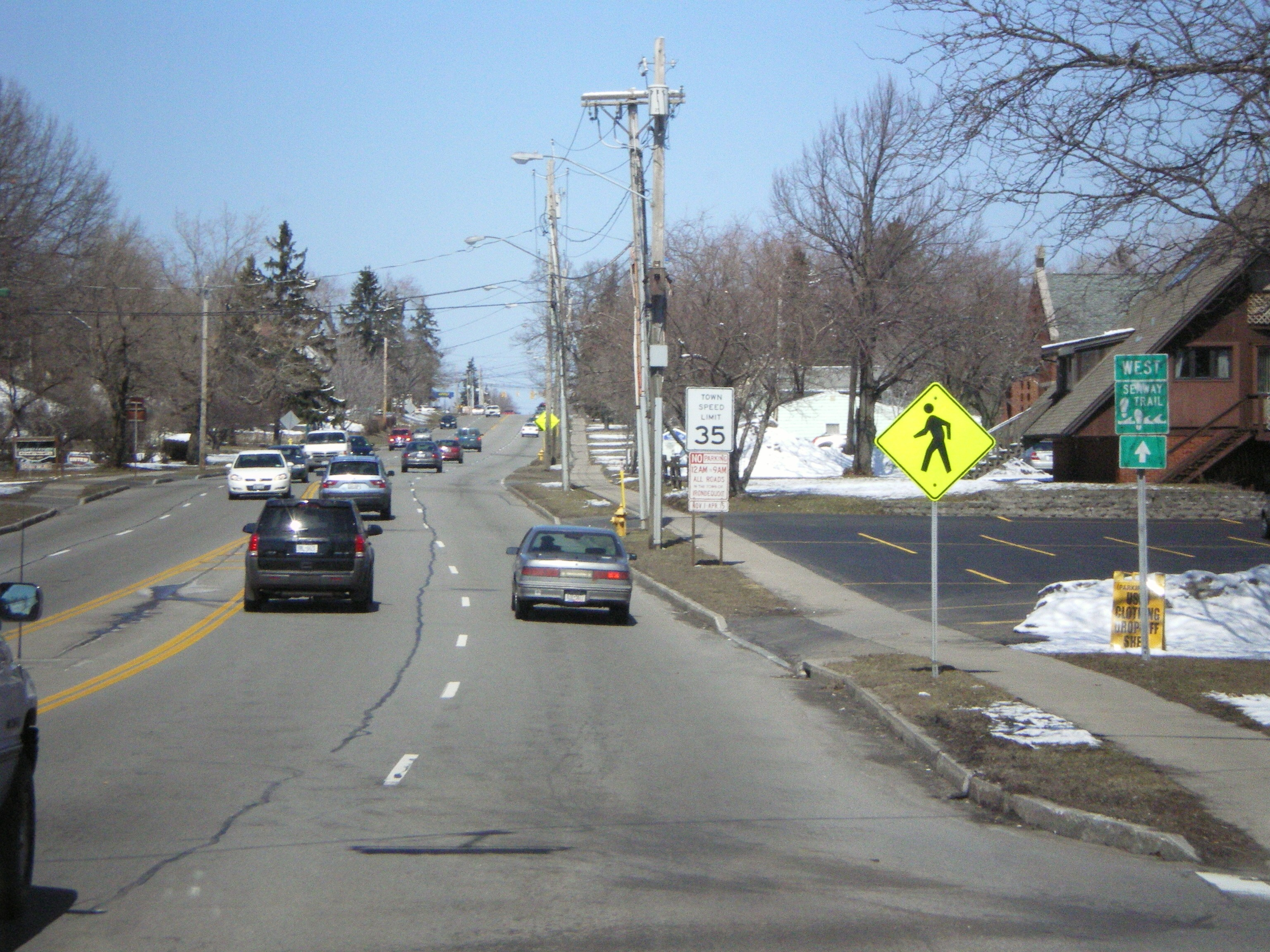
Northbound on Culver Road (former US 104) in Irondequoit just north of NY 104

Similar conversion projects were also conducted elsewhere. In Irondequoit, the portion of the Sea Breeze Expressway (now NY 590) from Empire Boulevard to Culver Road opened in the late 1950s. US 104 and NY 18 were extended eastward along East Ridge Road to meet the expressway at what is now exit 11. Both designations entered the freeway; however, NY 18 followed the roadway north to Culver Road while US 104 progressed south to Empire Boulevard, where it rejoined its former surface alignment towards Webster. The 0.71 miles (1.14 km) of Empire Boulevard between the Rochester city line and the Sea Breeze Expressway remains state-maintained to this day as NY 941B, an unsigned reference route.

In the mid-1960s, construction began on the Keeler Street Expressway, a limited-access highway extending across Irondequoit from the Genesee River (at the Veterans Memorial Bridge) to the Sea Breeze Expressway. The first section from North Goodman Street to the Sea Breeze Expressway was completed by 1968 while the remainder opened in late 1969. The name of the expressway was derived from Keeler Street, a small residential street that originally connected to East Ridge Road and St. Paul Street by way of a traffic circle on the east bank of the Genesee River. The street was turned into a dead-end street as a result of the expressway's construction. US 104 was moved from East Ridge Road to the expressway, which remains known, albeit infrequently, as the Keeler Street Expressway to this day. NY 18 remained on East Ridge Road, however, reducing the overlap between US 104 and NY 18 to just the portion on the Veterans Bridge. NY 18 was truncated to its current eastern terminus c. 1973, eliminating the overlap entirely.

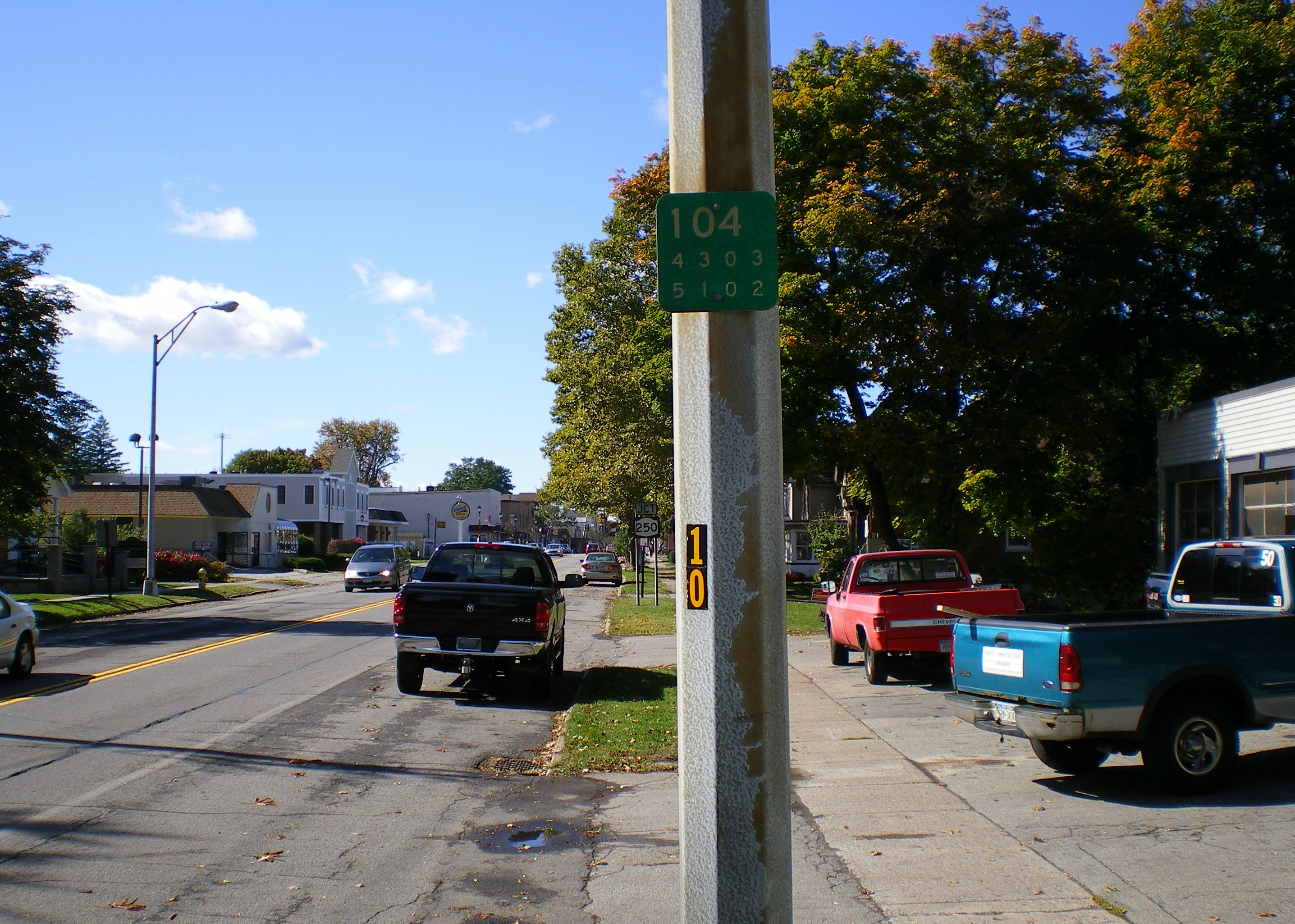
Reference marker for NY 104 on NY 404 in Webster. NY 404 is the former alignment of NY 104 through eastern Monroe County.

The first segment of an eastward extension of the Keeler Street Expressway, named the Irondequoit–Wayne County Expressway, opened c. 1971 between the Sea Breeze Expressway (at this point designated as part of NY 47) and Five Mile Line Road. In between, US 104 crossed Irondequoit Bay by way of the Irondequoit Bay Bridge. US 104's former surface alignment between NY 47 and Five Mile Line Road was redesignated NY 404 while US 104 was temporarily realigned onto Five Mile Line Road between the expressway and Ridge Road to connect to its former alignment.

=== Redesignation and completion ===
The segment of I-81 through central New York was built on an alignment that closely paralleled US 11 from the Pennsylvania state line northward to the city of Watertown. The portion of I-81 near Maple View was completed in late 1961, at which time US 104 was extended 1 mile (1.6 km) eastward over NY 126 to meet the new highway. NY 126 was truncated on its west end to the I-81 interchange as a result. US 104 was redesignated as NY 104 in June 1971, making the route the third to bear the NY 104 designation. As part of the change, NY 104 was extended east to NY 13, completely supplanting NY 126.

By 1978, the frontage roads between Five Mile Line Road and NY 250 in Webster were completed. NY 104 was rerouted eastward along the roadways while NY 404 was extended over NY 104's old alignment to NY 250 in Webster. The section from NY 250 to the existing expressway at the Wayne County line was built in the late 1970s while the main carriageway of NY 104 between Five Mile Line Road and NY 250 was completed in the early 1980s. NY 404 was extended east along the former alignment of NY 104 to the county line upon the total completion of the Five Mile Line Road–NY 250 segment.

== Suffixed routes ==
NY 104 has two suffixed routes, both of which were assigned c. 1935.

- NY 104A (17.38 miles or 27.97 kilometres) is an alternate route of NY 104 between Red Creek, Wayne County, and the town of Oswego, Oswego County.
- NY 104B (6.07 miles or 9.77 kilometres) is a spur in Oswego County that extends from NY 104 in New Haven to NY 3 in Texas.

== NY 104 Truck ==
New York State Route 104 Truck
- Location: Rochester–Irondequoit

New York State Route 104 Truck is a 1.3-mile (2.1 km) long truck route of NY 104 through the city of Rochester and town of Irondequoit in Monroe County. The route, which exists in the eastbound direction only, extends from the ramps connecting NY 104 to St. Paul Street east along East Ridge Road to Hudson Avenue, where it turns south to access NY 104. A 0.9-mile (1.4 km) long segment of NY 104 Truck follows the former alignment of US 104 east along East Ridge Road from St. Paul Street to Hudson Avenue.

== Major intersections ==
County	Location	mi	km	Destinations	Notes
Niagara	Niagara Falls	0.00	0.00	NY 384 (Niagara Street) / Great Lakes Seaway Trail to I-190	Western terminus; access to Rainbow Bridge to Canada
Niagara	Niagara Falls	0.16	0.26	US 62 south (Ferry Avenue)	Northern terminus of US 62
Niagara	Niagara Falls	0.35	0.56	US 62 north (Walnut Avenue)	Northern terminus of US 62
Niagara	Niagara Falls	0.51	0.82	US 62 Bus. east (Pine Avenue)	Western terminus of US 62 Business
Niagara	Niagara Falls	1.42	2.29	NY 182 (Cleveland Avenue)	
Niagara	Niagara Falls	2.51	4.04	NY 31 east (College Avenue)	Western terminus of NY 31
Niagara	Town of Lewiston	3.33	5.36	Niagara Scenic Parkway – Devils Hole, Lewiston, Youngstown, Fort Niagara	
Niagara	Town of Lewiston	3.69	5.94	NY 61 south (Hyde Park Boulevard)	Northern terminus of NY 61
Niagara	Town of Lewiston	4.88	7.85	I-190 / NY 265 – Canada, Buffalo	Interchange; access via Upper Mountain Road; exit 25B (I-190); NY 265 not signed
Niagara	Town of Lewiston	5.41	8.71	NY 265 south (Military Road)	Northern terminus of NY 265
Niagara	Village of Lewiston	5.95	9.58	NY 18 east	Interchange; eastbound exit and westbound entrance; western terminus of NY 18
Niagara	Town of Lewiston	6.49	10.44	NY 18F north / Great Lakes Seaway Trail / Niagara Scenic Parkway – Lewiston, Artpark, Fort Niagara, Niagara Falls	Interchange; southern terminus of NY 18F
Niagara	Town of Lewiston	7.17	11.54	NY 18	
Niagara	Lewiston–Cambria town line	14.24	22.92	NY 429 south (Townline Road) – North Tonawanda	Northern terminus of NY 429
Niagara	Cambria	17.28	27.81	NY 425 – Wilson	Hamlet of Streeters Corners
Niagara	Cambria	18.85	30.34	NY 93 west – Youngstown	Hamlet of Molyneaux Corners; western terminus of NY 93 / NY 104 overlap
Niagara	Cambria–Lockport town line	21.12	33.99	NY 93 east	Hamlet of Warrens Corners; eastern terminus of NY 93 / NY 104 overlap
Niagara	Lockport–Newfane town line	25.10	40.39	NY 78 south – Lockport	Hamlet of Wrights Corners; southern terminus of NY 78 / NY 104 overlap
Niagara	Newfane	25.41	40.89	NY 78 north – Olcott	Hamlet of Wrights Corners; northern terminus of NY 78 / NY 104 overlap
Niagara	Hartland	33.07	53.22	NY 148 north – Barker	Southern terminus of NY 148
Niagara	Hartland	37.06	59.64	NY 271 south – Middleport	Northern terminus of NY 271
Niagara–Orleans county line	Hartland–Ridgeway town line	37.60	60.51	NY 269 north	Southern terminus of NY 269; hamlet of Jeddo
Orleans	Ridgeway	41.34	66.53	NY 63 south – Medina	Western terminus of NY 63 / NY 104 overlap
Orleans	Ridgeway	41.50	66.79	NY 63 north – Lyndonville	Eastern terminus of NY 63 / NY 104 overlap
Orleans	Gaines	50.64	81.50	NY 279	Hamlet of Gaines
Orleans	Gaines	51.84	83.43	NY 98 – Lakeside Beach State Park, Point Breeze, Albion	Hamlet of Childs
Orleans	Murray	56.99	91.72	NY 387 south	Northern terminus of NY 387
Orleans	Murray	59.45	95.68	NY 237 north – Kendall	Hamlet of Murray; western terminus of NY 104 / NY 237 overlap
Orleans	Murray	60.32	97.08	NY 237 south – Holley	Eastern terminus of NY 104 / NY 237 overlap
Orleans–Monroe county line	Murray–Clarkson town line	62.30	100.26	NY 272 north	Southern terminus of NY 272
Monroe	Town of Clarkson	66.11	106.39	NY 19	Hamlet of Clarkson
Monroe	Town of Clarkson	68.09	109.58	NY 260	Hamlet of Garland
Monroe	Parma	73.08	117.61	NY 259 – Spencerport, Hilton	Hamlet of Parma Corners
Monroe	Parma–Greece town line	75.11	120.88	NY 261 north (Manitou Road)	Southern terminus of NY 261; hamlet of West Greece
Monroe	Town of Greece	76.28	122.76	NY 386 south (Elmgrove Road)	Northern terminus of NY 386
Monroe	Town of Greece	79.16	127.40	NY 390	Exit 24 (NY 390)
Monroe	Rochester	79.95	128.67	Mount Read Boulevard ( NY 940K)	
Monroe	Rochester	81.02	130.39	NY 18 west (Dewey Avenue)	Eastern terminus of NY 18
Monroe	Rochester	81.66	131.42	Lake Avenue ( NY 940M)	Northern terminus of unsigned NY 940M
Monroe	Rochester	Western end of freeway section			
Monroe	Rochester	81.91	131.82	Maplewood Drive	
Monroe	Rochester	82.27	132.40	Ridge Road East / St. Paul Street	Serves Seneca Park Zoo; eastbound exit and westbound entrance only
Monroe	Rochester	82.69	133.08	North Clinton Avenue / Seneca Avenue	Serves Seneca Park Zoo; western terminus of frontage roads ( NY 946A eastbound and NY 946B westbound)
Monroe	Rochester	83.35	134.14	Hudson Avenue	Eastbound exit only
Monroe	Rochester	83.74	134.77	Carter Street / Portland Avenue (east) / Hudson Avenue (west)	
Monroe	Irondequoit	84.40	135.83	Goodman Street / Portland Avenue (west)	Serves Rochester General Hospital; eastern terminus of eastbound frontage road ( NY 946A)
Monroe	Irondequoit	85.33	137.33	Culver Road (Seaway Trail) – Sea Breeze	Eastern terminus of westbound frontage road ( NY 946B)
Monroe	Irondequoit	85.91	138.26	NY 590 south – Downtown Rochester	
Monroe	Irondequoit–Webster			Irondequoit Bay Bridge	
Monroe	Town of Webster	88.24	142.01	Bay Road	
Monroe	Town of Webster	90.28	145.29	Five Mile Line Road	Western terminus of frontage roads ( NY 946C eastbound and NY 946D westbound)
Monroe	Town of Webster	90.98	146.42	Hard Road / Holt Road	Eastbound exit and entrance only
Monroe	Town of Webster	91.87	147.85	Hard Road / Holt Road	Westbound exit and entrance only
Monroe	Village of Webster	92.57	148.98	NY 250 – Webster	Eastern terminus of frontage roads ( NY 946C eastbound and NY 946D westbound)
Monroe	Village of Webster	93.15	149.91	Phillips Road	Serves Xerox Wilson Center; eastbound exit and westbound entrance only
Monroe	Town of Webster	94.12	151.47	Salt Road	
Monroe	Town of Webster	Eastern end of freeway section			
Monroe–Wayne county line	Webster–Ontario town line	95.43	153.58	NY 404 west (County Line Road) – Union Hill	Eastern terminus of NY 404
Wayne	Ontario	98.92	159.20	NY 350 south (Ontario Center Road) – Ontario Center, Macedon	Hamlet of Ontario Center; northern terminus of NY 350
Wayne	Town of Williamson	104.97	168.93	NY 21 south (Lake Avenue) – Palmyra	Northern terminus of NY 21; hamlet of Williamson
Wayne	Town of Sodus	110.49	177.82	NY 88 south – Sodus, Newark	Northern terminus of NY 88
Wayne	Town of Sodus	116.28	187.13	NY 14 – Sodus Point, Lyons	Hamlet of Alton
Wayne	Huron	120.35	193.68	NY 414 south	Northern terminus of NY 414
Wayne	Butler	125.56	202.07	NY 89 south	Interchange; eastbound exit and westbound entrance only; northern terminus of NY 89
Wayne	Town of Wolcott	127.01	204.40	CR 163 (Ridge Road) to NY 89 – Wolcott	
Wayne	Town of Wolcott	129.72	208.76	NY 104A east / NY 370 east – Red Creek, Fair Haven, Syracuse	Western terminus of NY 104A and NY 370
Cayuga	Sterling	134.85	217.02	NY 38 – Port Byron, Fair Haven Beach State Park	Hamlet of North Victory
Oswego	Town of Hannibal	139.84	225.05	NY 34 south – Cato, Weedsport	Northern terminus of NY 34
Oswego	Village of Hannibal	141.30	227.40	NY 3 – Hannibal, Fulton	
Oswego	Town of Oswego	147.31	237.07	NY 104A west / Great Lakes Seaway Trail – Fair Haven	Hamlet of Southwest Oswego; eastern terminus of NY 104A
Oswego	Oswego	152.12	244.81	NY 48 south (West Fifth Street)	Northern terminus of NY 48
Oswego	Oswego	152.53	245.47	NY 481 south (East First Street)	Northern terminus of NY 481
Oswego	New Haven	161.67	260.18	NY 104B east / Great Lakes Seaway Trail – Pulaski, Watertown	Western terminus of NY 104B
Oswego	Village of Mexico	166.72	268.31	NY 3 west – Fulton	Western terminus of NY 3 / NY 104 overlap
Oswego	Village of Mexico	166.96	268.70	NY 3 east – Port Ontario, Watertown	Eastern terminus of NY 3 / NY 104 overlap
Oswego	Village of Mexico	167.10	268.92	NY 69 east – Parish	Western terminus of NY 69
Oswego	Town of Mexico	171.38	275.81	US 11	Hamlet of Maple View
Oswego	Town of Parish	172.53	277.66	I-81 – Syracuse, Watertown	Exit 118 (I-81)
Oswego	Williamstown	182.41	293.56	NY 13 – Altmar, Williamstown, Camden	Eastern terminus
1.000 mi = 1.609 km; 1.000 km = 0.621 mi: Concurrency terminus; Incomplete access

== See also ==
Former alignments

- Ridge Road, from the Veterans Memorial Bridge to Red Creek
- New York State Route 404, NY 590 in Rochester to NY 104 in Union Hill
- New York State Route 370, small portion of Ridge Road near Red Creek
- New York State Route 104A, partially former US 104 in Red Creek
