= Hannibal (village), New York =

Hannibal, New York
- Village
- Location in Oswego County and the state of New York.
- Coordinates: 43°19′15″N 76°34′34″W
- Country: United States
- State: New York
- County: Oswego

Area
  - Total: 1.15 sq mi (2.98 km^{2})
  - Land: 1.15 sq mi (2.98 km^{2})
  - Water: 0 sq mi (0.00 km^{2})
- Elevation: 330 ft (100 m)

Population (2020)
  - Total: 535
  - Density: 464.3/sq mi (179.25/km^{2})
- Time zone: UTC-5 (Eastern (EST))
  - Summer (DST): UTC-4 (EDT)
- ZIP code: 13074
- Area code: 315
- FIPS code: 36-32017
- GNIS feature ID: 0952170

Hannibal is a village in Oswego County, New York, United States. The population was 535 at the 2020 census. The village is named after Hannibal, the hero of ancient Carthage, and is located in the western part of the town of Hannibal on New York State routes 3 and 104, and Oswego County Route 34.

== History ==
The first settlement came circa 1808 with a structure made of logs on the site of a former Indian encampment. The village was incorporated in 1860. The population was then 416. By 1895, the population had reached 450.

== Geography ==
Hannibal is located at 43°19′15″N 76°34′34″W (43.320945, -76.576193). The village is located on Nine Mile Creek.

According to the United States Census Bureau, the village has a total area of 1.1 square miles (3.0 km^{2}), all land.

== Demographics ==
Historical population
Census	Pop.	Note	%±
1870	454		—
1880	490		7.9%
1890	452		−7.8%
1900	410		−9.3%
1910	330		−19.5%
1920	400		21.2%
1930	410		2.5%
1940	437		6.6%
1950	501		14.6%
1960	611		22.0%
1970	686		12.3%
1980	680		−0.9%
1990	613		−9.9%
2000	542		−11.6%
2010	555		2.4%
2020	535		−3.6%
U.S. Decennial Census

At the 2000 census, there were 542 people, 213 households and 138 families residing in the village. The population density was 476.5 inhabitants per square mile (184.0/km^{2}). There were 235 housing units at an average density of 206.6 per square mile (79.8/km^{2}). The racial makeup of the village was 98.89% White, 0.55% Black or African American, 0.37% Native American, and 0.18% from two or more races. Hispanic or Latino of any race were 0.55% of the population.

There were 213 households, of which 33.3% had children under the age of 18 living with them, 48.8% were married couples living together, 11.7% had a female householder with no husband present and 35.2% were non-families. 26.8% of all households were made up of individuals, and 14.1% had someone living alone who was 65 years of age or older. The average household size was 2.54 and the average family size was 3.16.

26.4% of the population were under the age of 18, 8.1% from 18 to 24, 27.1% from 25 to 44, 26.8% from 45 to 64, and 11.6% who were 65 years of age or older. The median age was 37 years. For every 100 females, there were 88.9 males. For every 100 females age 18 and over, there were 89.1 males.

The median household income was $33,333 and the median family income was $50,556. Males had a median income of $32,292 and females $20,875. The per capita income was $16,345. About 6.6% of families and 13.0% of the population were below the poverty line, including 12.9% of those under age 18 and 20.9% of those age 65 or over.

== Education ==
Public K-12 education is provided by the Hannibal Central School District.
