= Irondequoit Bay =

Bay on south shore of Lake Ontario

- O-nyiu-da-on-da-gwat (Seneca)
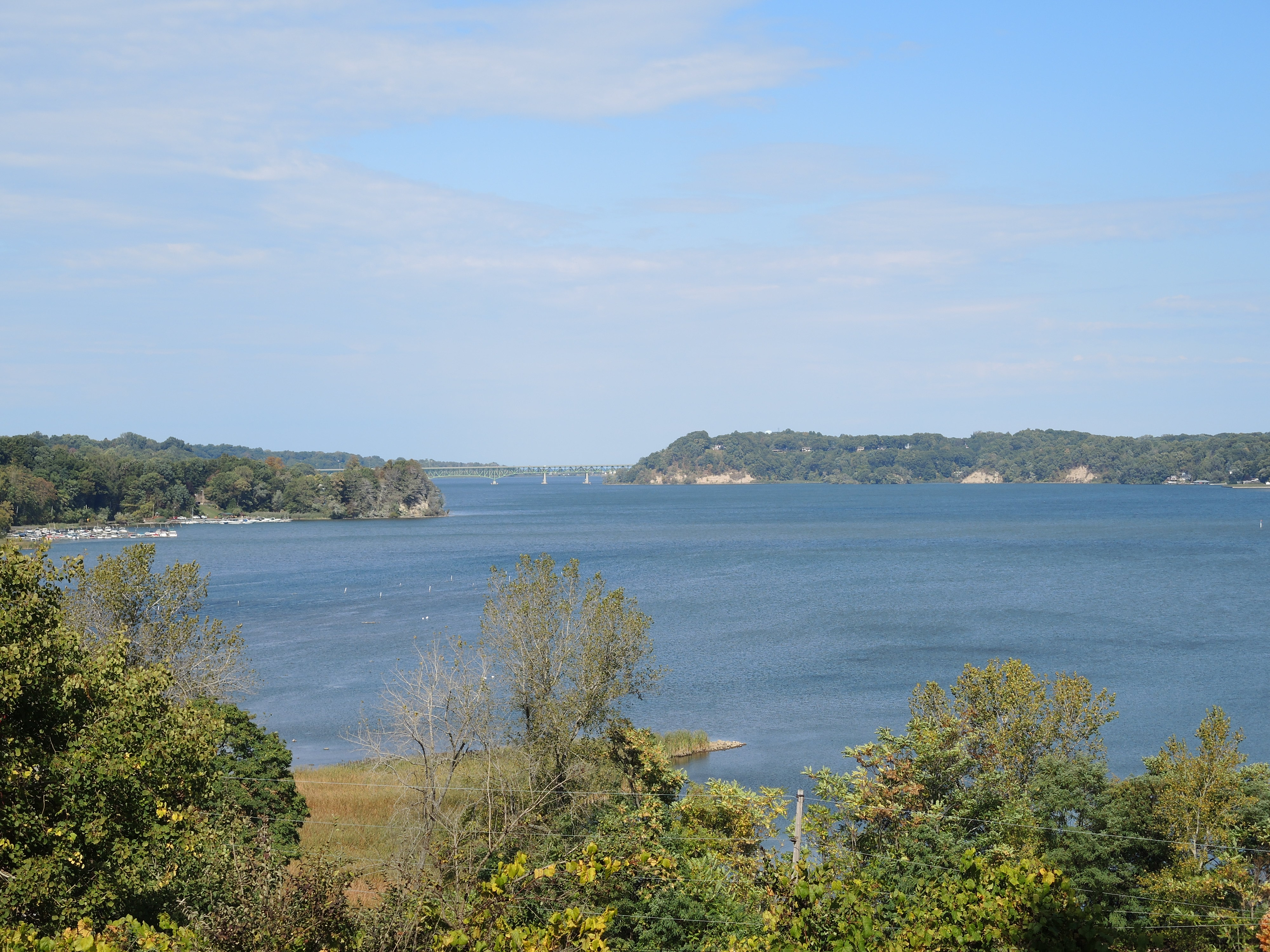
- View from Lucien Morin Park in Penfield, New York

- Location within New York
- Coordinates: 43.205°N 77.531°W
- Type: Bay
- Etymology: "It turns out"/"It goes aside"
- Primary inflows: Densmore Creek, Irondequoit Creek
- Primary outflows: Lake Ontario
- Managing agency: New York State Department of Environmental Conservation
- Max. length: 4 miles (6.4 km)
- Max. width: 0.5 miles (0.80 km)
- Surface area: 1,660 acres (670 ha)
- Max. depth: 73 feet (22 m)
- Shore length^{1}: 17.7 miles (28.5 km)
- Surface elevation: 250 feet (76 m)
- Islands: Fish Island, Held Island, Snider Island
- Settlements: Irondequoit, Penfield, Webster
- ^{1} Shore length is not a well-defined measure.

Irondequoit Bay is a large body of water located in northeastern Monroe County, New York. The bay, roughly 0.5 miles (0.80 km) wide and 4 miles (6.4 km) in length, is fed by Irondequoit Creek to the south and flows into Lake Ontario at its northern end. On average, the surface of Irondequoit Bay rests at 245 feet (75 m) above sea level and is 80 feet (24 m) deep at its deepest point a short distance north of the Irondequoit Bay Bridge carrying the six-lane New York State Route 104 over the bay.

The center of the bay acts as the eastern border for the town of Irondequoit and the western border of the towns of Penfield and Webster. The Irondequoit–Penfield boundary continues along the center of Irondequoit Creek south of the New York State Route 404 float bridge.

During the past million years there were four glacial ages that covered the Rochester area with ice and impacted the geography of the area. The most recent glacier that left evidence here was about 100,000 years ago and it caused compression of the earth by as much as 2,500 feet (760 m). About 12,000 years ago, the area underwent massive changes, which included the rerouting of the Genesee River and other water bodies. Since the earth rebounded from the melting glaciers more rapidly in Canada than in New York, water from Lake Ontario was spilled over New York due to its lower elevation. During this time, the original outlet of the Genesee River was flooded out, creating Irondequoit Bay.

On a French map of the area from 1688 titled "Le Lac Ontario" Irondequoit Bay was referred to as the "swamp of the Senecas". Prior to the 1840s, the bay was known as "Teoronto Bay."

Seven parks abut the bay:

- Devil's Cove Park, Webster
- Ellison Park, Penfield
- Irondequoit Bay Marine Park, Irondequoit
- Abraham Lincoln Park (formerly Irondequoit Bay Park East), Penfield
- Irondequoit Bay Park West, Irondequoit
- LaSalle's Landing Park, Penfield
- Sandbar Park, Webster
