= Veterans Memorial Bridge (Rochester, New York) =

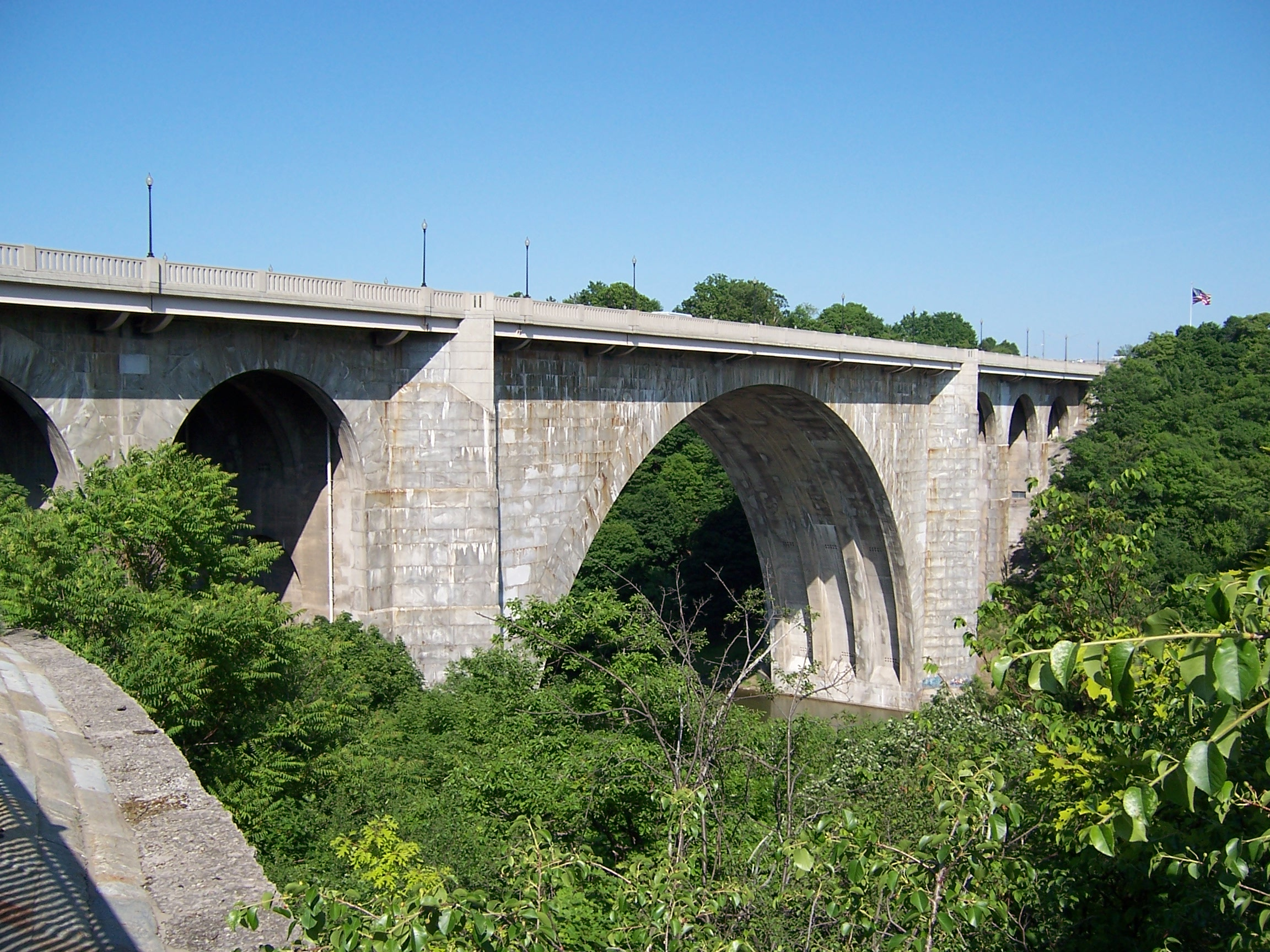
- Coordinates: 43°11′33″N 77°37′14″W
- Carries: Eight lanes of NY 104; Pedestrians
- Crosses: Genesee River
- Locale: Rochester, New York
- Maintained by: New York State Department of Transportation
- Preceded by: Driving Park Bridge
- Followed by: Kodak Park/Seneca Park pedestrian walkway

Characteristics
- Material: Steel faced with white granite
- Total length: 981 feet (299 m)
- Width: 106 feet (32 m)
- Height: 190 feet (58 m)
- No. of spans: 3

History
- Architect: Gehron & Ross
- Designer: F. P. McKibben
- Constructed by: Booth & Flinn Company
- Construction start: 1928; 97 years ago
- Construction end: 1931; 94 years ago
- Opened: 1931; 94 years ago

The Veterans Memorial Bridge in Rochester, New York, carries New York State Route 104 (less well known as the Keeler Street Expressway) across the Genesee River. The bridge is an architecturally significant concrete arch faced with white granite. Conceived in 1928 and finished in 1931, the span is the longest bridge in Rochester at 981 feet (299 m). It is 190 feet (58 m) in height and 106 feet (32 m) wide.

The bridge was originally connected to a traffic circle but was changed to an interchange in the 1960s.

Additional links have been included below for background information for future expansion of this article.

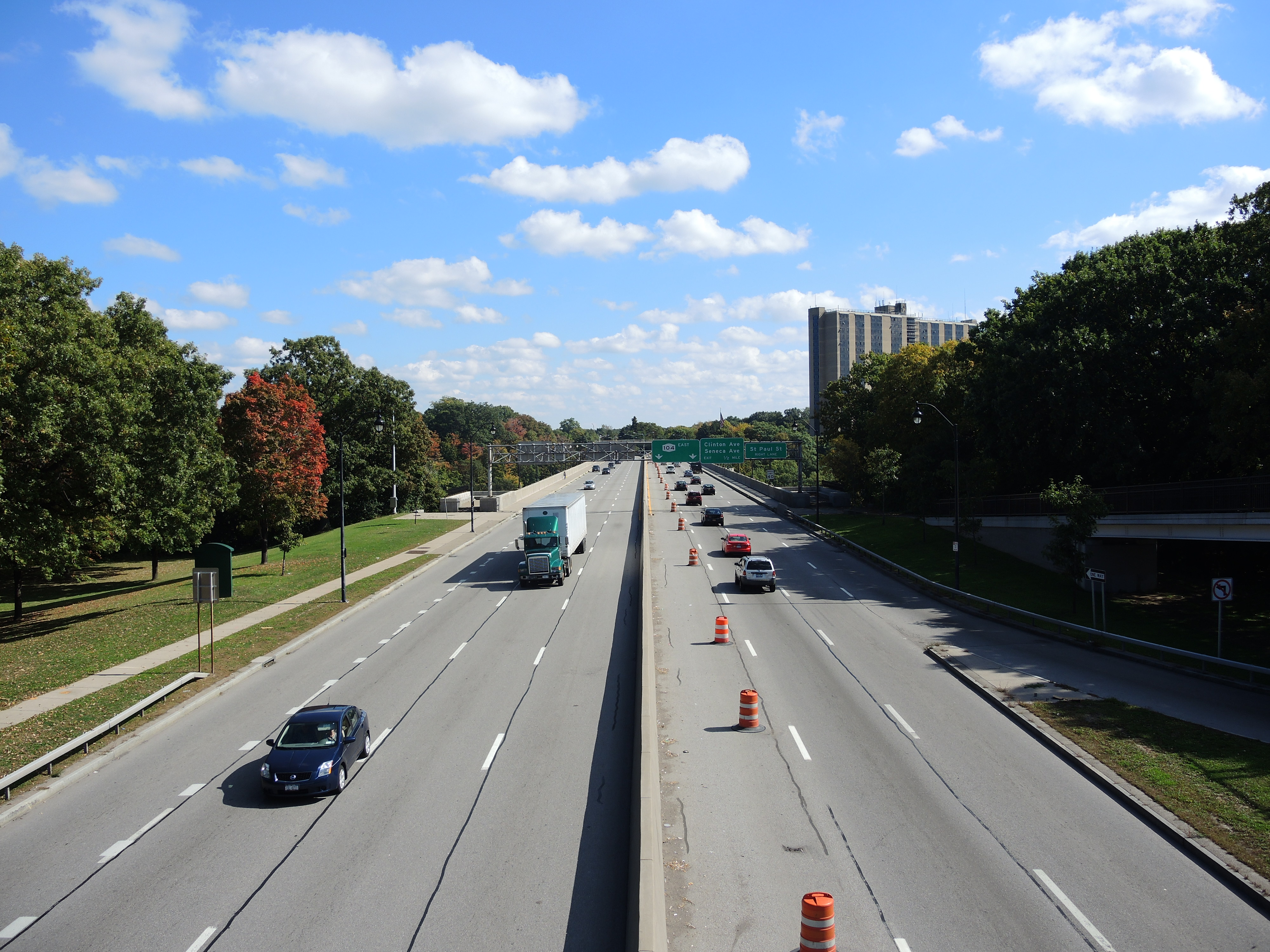
Route 104 as it crosses the bridge

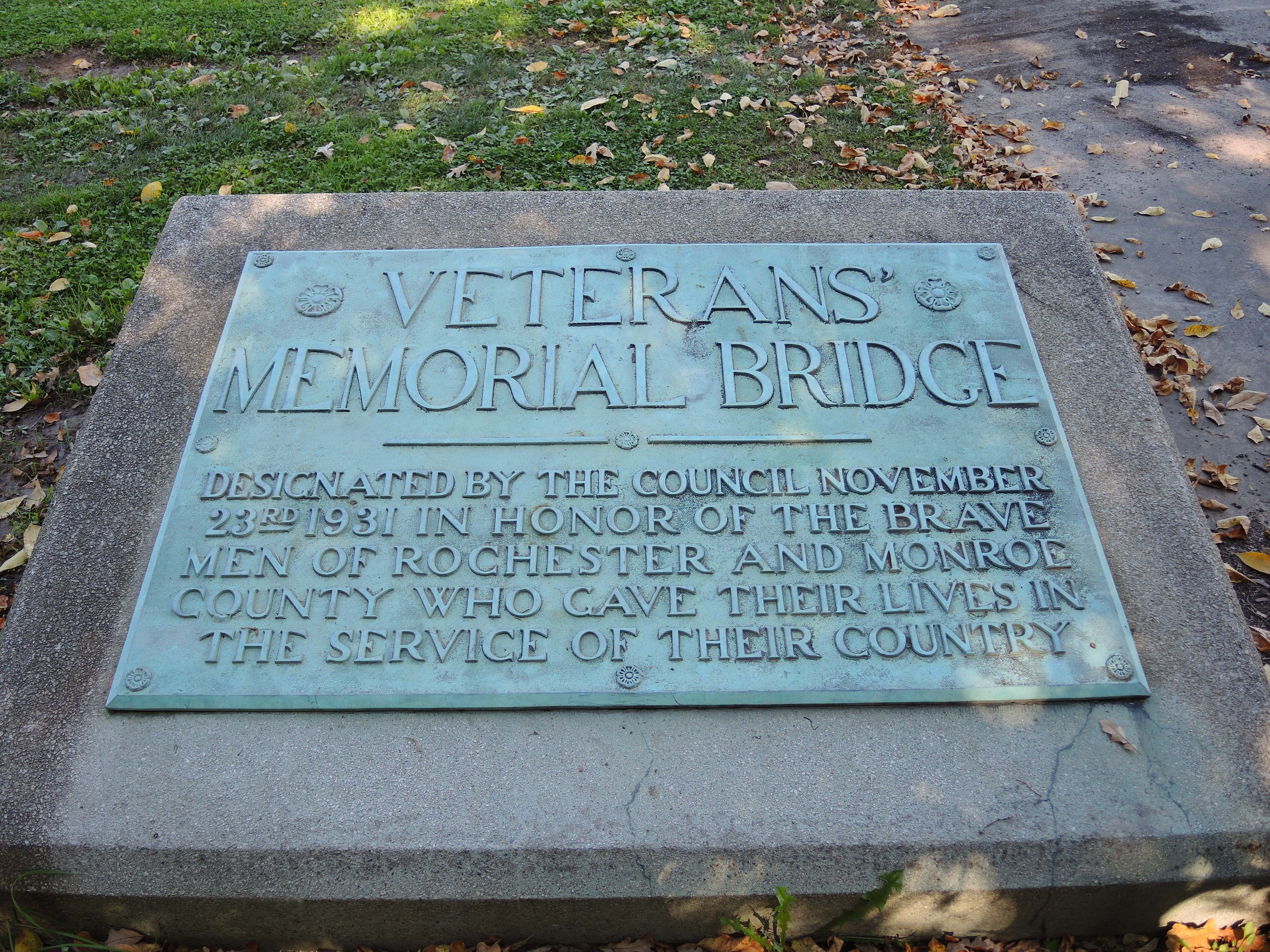
Plaque located along Route 104 on the west side of the bridge

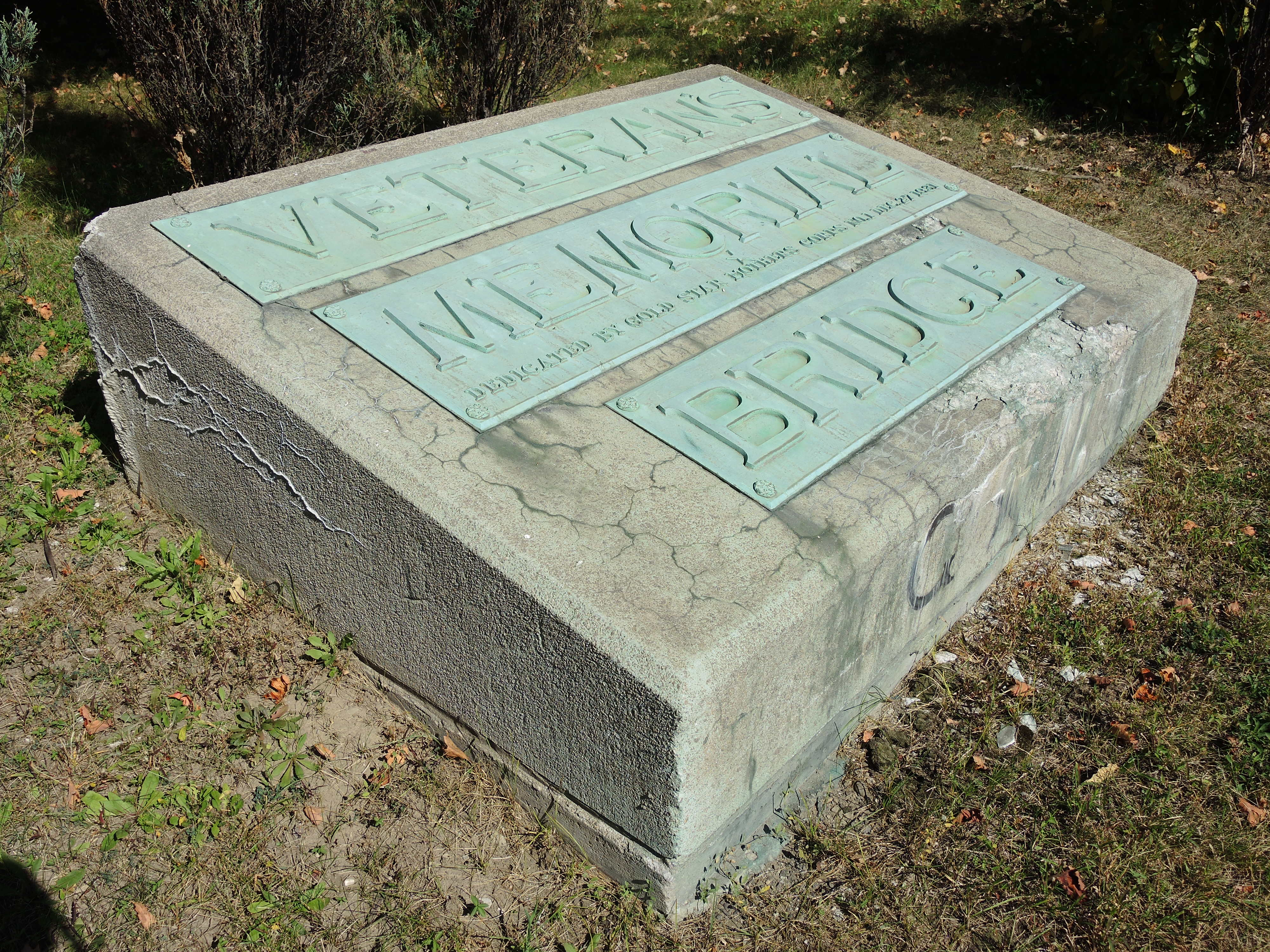
Plaque located along Route 104 on the east side of the bridge adjacent to Maplewood Park

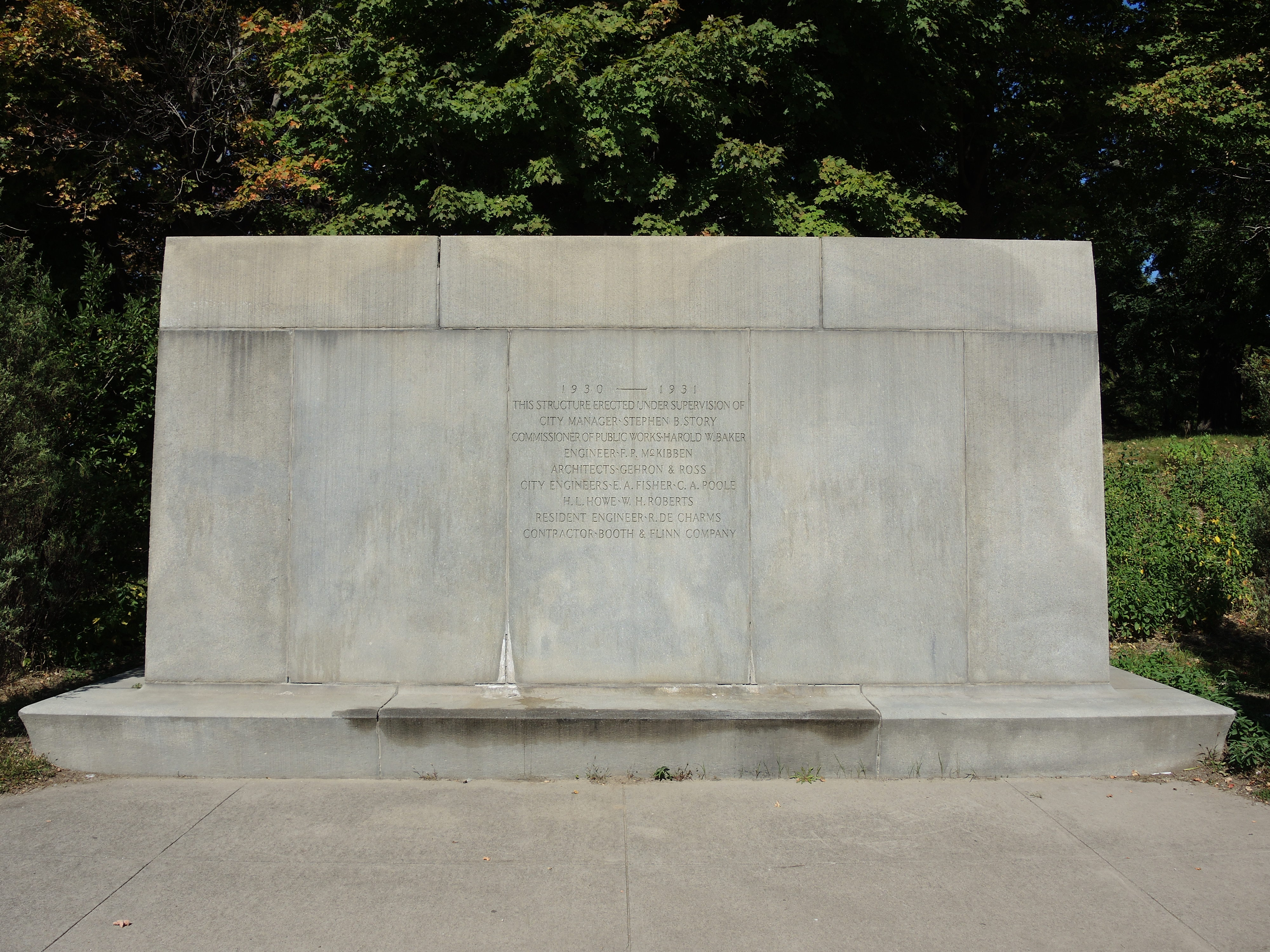
Monument along Route 104 on the east side of the bridge in Seneca Park

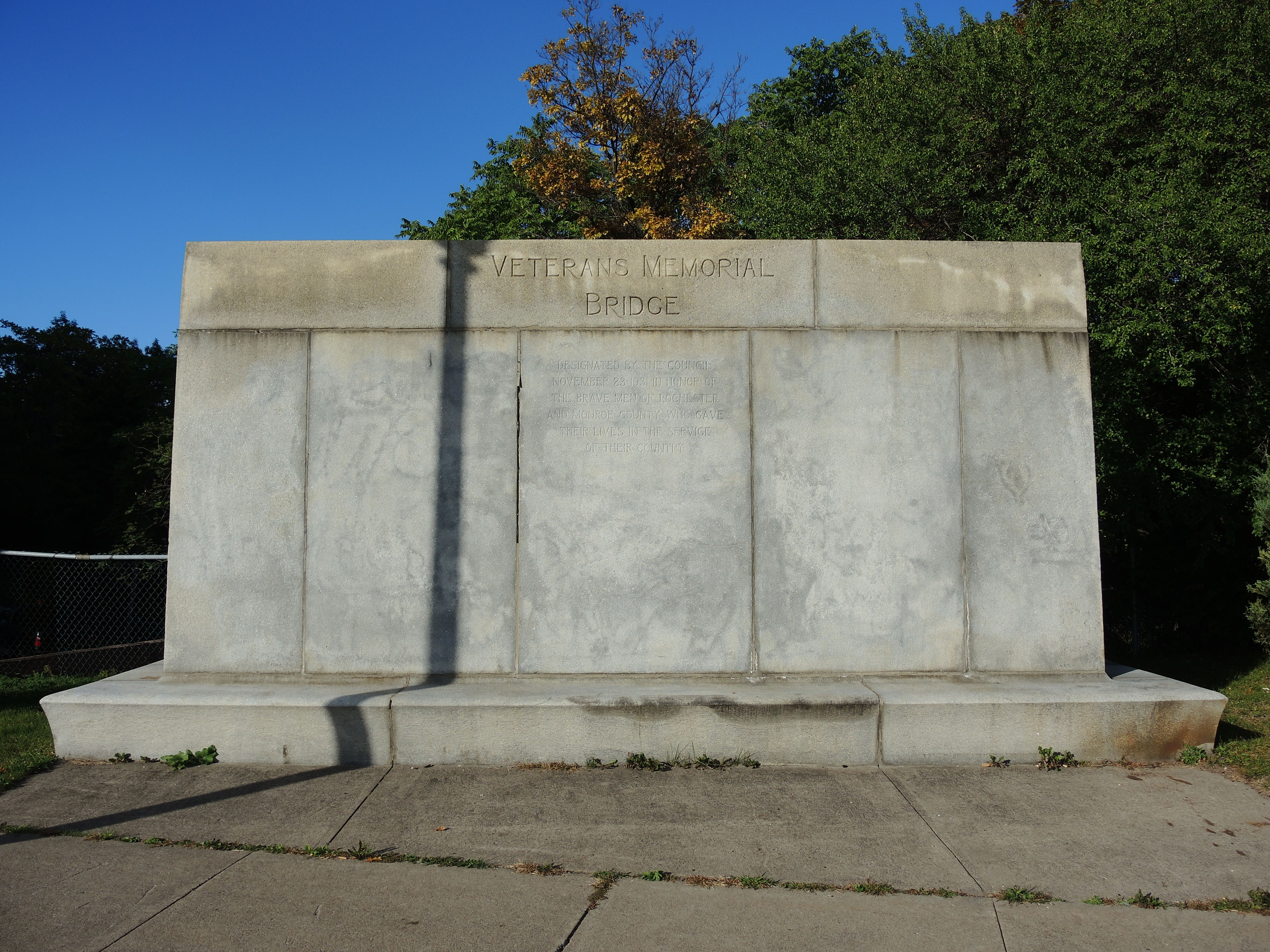
Monument along Route 104 on the east side of the bridge adjacent to Seneca Towers

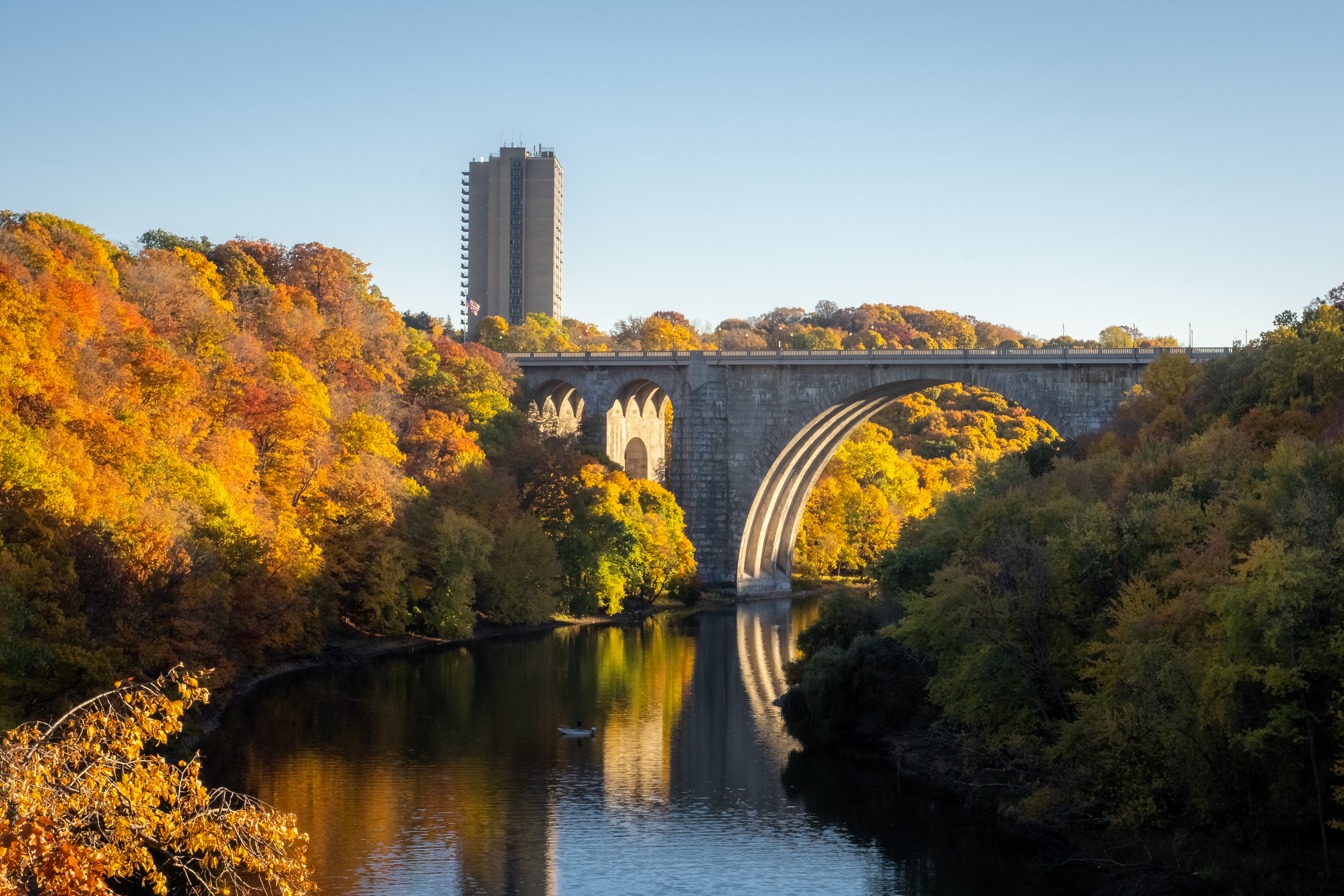
The bridge in Autumn, viewed from Seneca Park
