= Clarkson, New York =

Town in Monroe County, New York, United States

- Town
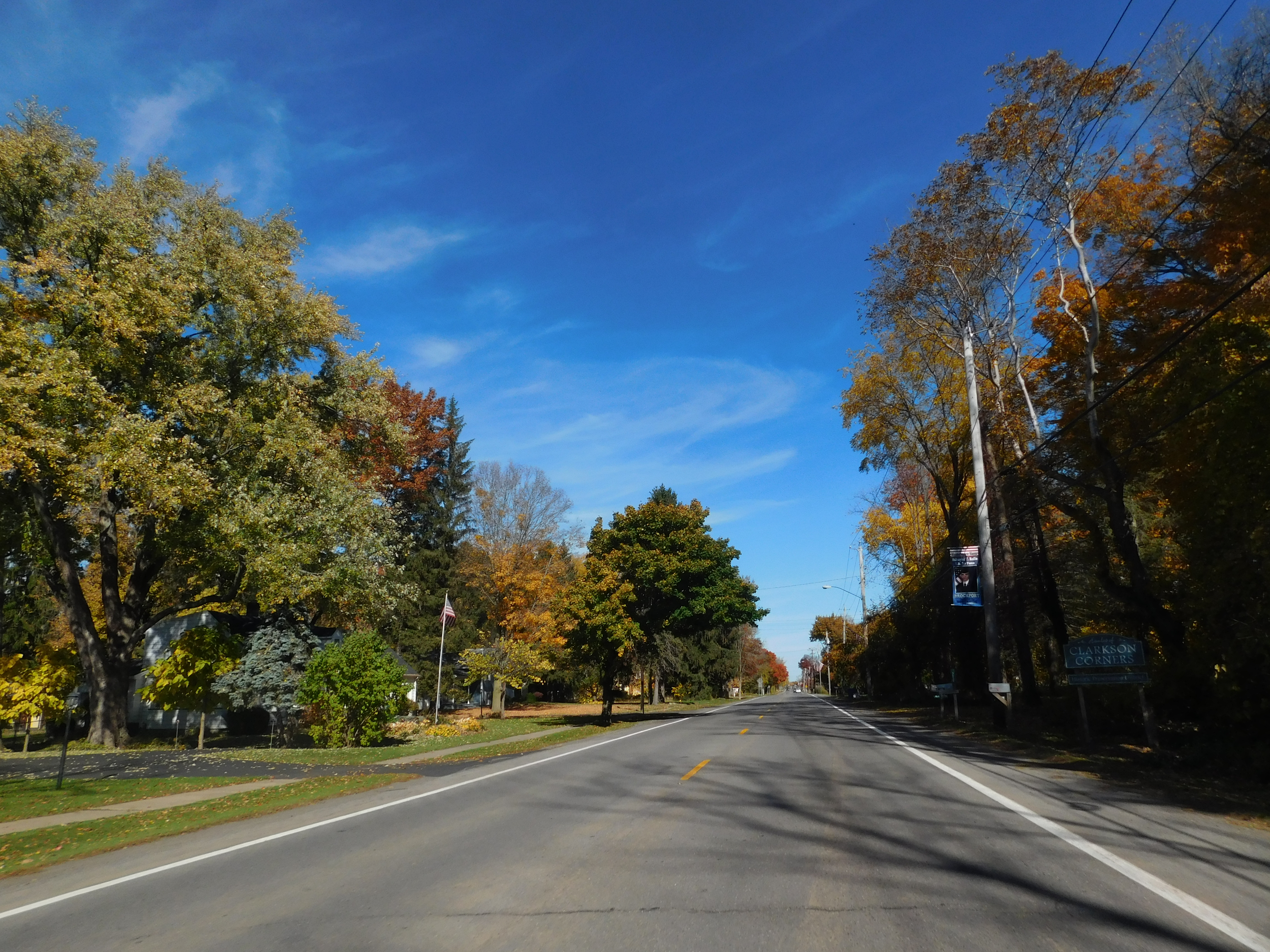
- New York State Route 19 northbound entering Clarkson Corners

- Location in Monroe County and the state of New York

- Location of New York in the United States
- Coordinates: 43°15′07″N 77°55′19″W
- Country: United States
- State: New York
- County: Monroe
- Established: April 2, 1819; 207 years ago

Government
  - Town supervisor: Christa L. Filipowicz (R) 2019 - Present Town council: Patrick M. Didas (R); Leslie Zink (R); Allan T. Hoy (R); Thomas A. Guarino (R)

Area
  - Total: 33.19 sq mi (85.95 km^{2})
  - Land: 33.18 sq mi (85.93 km^{2})
  - Water: 0.0039 sq mi (0.01 km^{2})
- Elevation: 368 ft (112 m)

Population (2020)
  - Total: 6,904
  - Density: 208.1/sq mi (80.34/km^{2})
- Time zone: UTC-5 (EST)
  - Summer (DST): UTC-4 (EDT)
- ZIP Codes: 14430 (Clarkson); 14420 (Brockport); 14464 (Hamlin); 14468 (Hilton); 14470 (Holley)
- Area code: 585
- FIPS code: 36-055-15957
- Website: www.clarksonny.org

Clarkson is a town in Monroe County, New York, United States, on the western border of the county and west of the city of Rochester. The population was 6,904 at the 2020 census. The town is named after General Matthew Clarkson.

== History ==
Matthew Clarkson was an extensive landowner in this locality, who gave 100 acres (40 ha) to the town. Clarkson was formed from the town of Murray on April 2, 1819. Clarkson was reduced to form the town of Union (the present town of Hamlin) in 1852.

It has been claimed that Moddy Freeman was the first settler in Clarkson. James Sayres purchased at Clarkson Corners in 1804 and was the first settler on the Ridge Road. Eli Blodgett also settled here in 1804, and there were many others prior to 1809. In 1819 and a year or two thereafter, settlement and development progressed rapidly. It was the home of Henry R. Seldon, judge of the Court of Appeals, and later lieutenant governor of New York. The first male child born was a son to Mrs. Clarkson; the first female birth was that of Betsey Palmer, in 1812. Charlotte Cummings taught the first school, in 1812. Henry McCall kept the first store, about 1810. Isaac Williams built the first frame house and was the first blacksmith. Dr. Noah Owen was the first physician and Dr. Rowe the second. John Bowman was the first lawyer. The first and about the only newspaper published in Clarkson was the Jeffersonian, in 1835, which continued for only a year. The first sawmill was erected previous to 1811, by James Sayres, and stood a half-mile east of the corners. Several distilleries were among the early industries along the Ridge Road. A post-office was established in 1816, Dr. Baldwin being the first postmaster.

Ridge Road was an important thoroughfare during the war times of 1812-15, and Clarkson was the general rendezvous for troops and the temporary depository for supplies and munitions of war. Clarkson village, then known as "Murray Corners", was a hamlet of considerable note, the Ridge Road being the main route between Canandaigua and Lewiston. The Corners was a stopping-place where horses were changed and travelers allowed a brief respite, but since the completion of the Erie Canal, and the still later construction of the New York Central Railroad, the neighboring town of Sweden has gained ascendency and profited, while Clarkson has correspondingly lost in commercial importance.

== Geography ==
Clarkson is northwestern Monroe County and is bordered to the south by the village of Brockport and to the west by Orleans County. New York State Route 272 forms part of the county line. New York State Route 104 (Ridge Road) is the east-west highway through Clarkson, leading east 17 miles (27 km) to the northern part of Rochester and west 59 miles (95 km) to Lewiston. Route 19 crosses Route 104 at Clarkson Corners, leading north 5 miles (8 km) to Hamlin and 8 miles (13 km) to Lake Ontario, and south through Brockport 15 miles (24 km) to the New York State Thruway and Interstate 490.

According to the U.S. Census Bureau, the town of Clarkson has a total area of 33.2 square miles (86 km^{2}), of which 0.005 square miles (0.013 km^{2}), or 0.02%, are water.

== Demographics ==
Historical population
Census	Pop.	Note	%±
1820	1,612		—
1830	3,251		101.7%
1840	3,486		7.2%
1850	4,555		30.7%
1860	2,093		−54.1%
1870	1,884		−10.0%
1880	2,160		14.6%
1890	1,741		−19.4%
1900	1,581		−9.2%
1910	1,549		−2.0%
1920	1,403		−9.4%
1930	1,456		3.8%
1940	1,449		−0.5%
1950	1,912		32.0%
1960	2,339		22.3%
1970	3,642		55.7%
1980	4,016		10.3%
1990	4,517		12.5%
2000	6,072		34.4%
2010	6,736		10.9%
2020	6,904		2.5%
U.S. Decennial Census

As of the census of 2000, there were 6,072 people, 2,034 households, and 1,582 families residing in the town. The population density was 182.8 inhabitants per square mile (70.6/km^{2}). There were 2,090 housing units at an average density of 62.9 per square mile (24.3/km^{2}). The racial makeup of the town was 93.92% White, 2.03% African American, 0.25% Native American, 0.64% Asian, 0.05% Pacific Islander, 1.40% from other races, and 1.71% from two or more races. Hispanic or Latino of any race were 2.72% of the population.

There were 2,034 households, out of which 41.3% had children under the age of 18 living with them, 64.7% were married couples living together, 9.8% had a female householder with no husband present, and 22.2% were non-families. 18.1% of all households were made up of individuals, and 8.4% had someone living alone who was 65 years of age or older. The average household size was 2.86 and the average family size was 3.26.

In the town, the population was spread out, with 29.4% under the age of 18, 6.0% from 18 to 24, 30.7% from 25 to 44, 21.9% from 45 to 64, and 11.9% who were 65 years of age or older. The median age was 36 years. For every 100 females, there were 94.8 males. For every 100 females age 18 and over, there were 89.9 males.

The median income for a household in the town was $53,438, and the median income for a family was $58,212. Males had a median income of $41,397 versus $25,795 for females. The per capita income for the town was $20,555. About 3.1% of families and 4.9% of the population were below the poverty line, including 4.0% of those under age 18 and 7.6% of those age 65 or over.

== Communities and locations ==
- Brockport – Two small parts of the village of Brockport are in the town.
- Clarkson – A census-designated place located in the southern part of the town, centered on the intersection of State Routes 19 and 104.
- Clarkson Corners – A hamlet in the census-designated place of Clarkson, formerly known as "Murray Corners" and "Clarkson" (until 2009) that was an important community on Ridge Road until the opening of the Erie Canal and railroads. The Clarkson Corners Historic District was listed on the National Register of Historic Places in 1994.
- Garland – A hamlet in the southeast part of town on Ridge Road (NY-104), also part of the Clarkson CDP.
- Morton – A hamlet at the west town line on NY-272.
- Otis – A location in the northeast part of the town.
- Redman Corners – A hamlet on Ridge Road on the west side of the town.
- Ridge Road – NYS-104, once the major highway between Rochester and Niagara Falls.

== Government ==
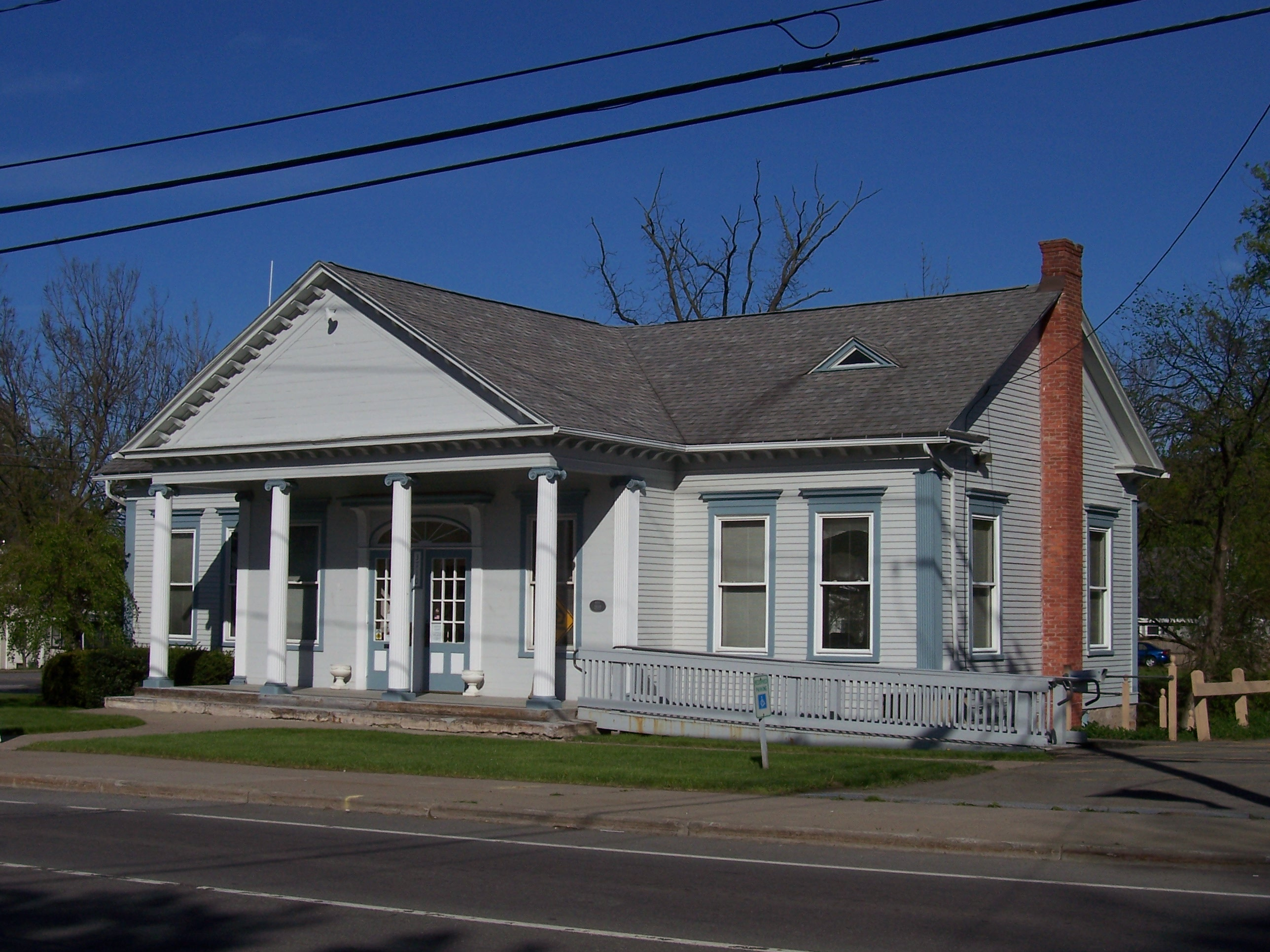
Clarkson Town Hall

The town is governed by a Town Board consisting of a Town Supervisor and four Town Council members, all elected by registered town voters. The Supervisor serves in both the executive and legislative branch for the town. The board handels town finances and general management. Ursula Liotta is town supervisor.
