= Irondequoit Bay State Marine Park =

State park in Monroe County, New York

- Location within New York
- Type: State park
- Location: Culver Road; Irondequoit, New York
- Nearest city: Rochester, New York
- Coordinates: 43°13′55″N 77°32′24″W
- Area: 44 acres (0.18 km^{2})
- Created: 1970
- Operator: Monroe County Parks Department; New York State Office of Parks, Recreation and Historic Preservation
- Visitors: 41,812 (in 2014)
- Open: All year
- Website: Irondequoit Bay Marine Park

Irondequoit Bay State Marine Park is a 44-acre (0.18 km^{2}) state park and boat launch located in Monroe County, New York, north of the City of Rochester. The park is operated by the Town of Irondqeuoit and primarily facilitates fishing and boating access to Irondequoit Bay and Lake Ontario.

== Park description ==
Irondequoit Bay State Marine Park includes space and facilities for fishing, boating, geocaching, kayaking, and canoeing. The park is typically open daily from 7 a.m. until 11 p.m., except during the winter months (November 1 through March 31), when the park closes at 4 p.m. Monday through Thursday. The park's boat launch is open from 6 a.m. to 8 p.m., starting in late spring.

== See also ==
- List of New York state parks
