= Lewiston (village), New York =

Lewiston Yehęwakwáʼthaʼ (Tuscarora)
- Village
- Village of Lewiston
- Flag

- Location in Niagara County and the state of New York.
- Coordinates: 43°10′5″N 79°0′33″W
- Country: United States
- State: New York
- County: Niagara
- Named for: Governor Morgan Lewis

Government
  - Mayor: Anne Welch
  - Deputy Mayor: Victor Eydt

Area
  - Total: 1.24 sq mi (3.20 km^{2})
  - Land: 1.10 sq mi (2.84 km^{2})
  - Water: 0.14 sq mi (0.36 km^{2})
- Elevation: 430 ft (130 m)

Population (2020)
  - Total: 2,531
  - Density: 2,308.0/sq mi (891.12/km^{2})
- Time zone: UTC-5 (Eastern (EST))
  - Summer (DST): UTC-4 (EDT)
- ZIP code: 14092
- Area code: 716
- FIPS code: 36-42147
- GNIS feature ID: 0979146
- Website: villageoflewistonny.gov

Lewiston is a village in Niagara County, New York, United States. The population was 2,701 at the 2010 census. The village is named after Morgan Lewis, an early 19th-century governor of New York. It is part of the Buffalo–Niagara Falls Metropolitan Statistical Area.

The Village of Lewiston, NY (also known as Yehęwakwáʼthaʼ in Tuscarora) is within the Town of Lewiston. The Earl W. Brydges Artpark State Park lies at its southern border. Lewiston was selected by Rand McNally as one of the "Top Ten Best Small Towns in America" in November 2012.

Lewiston is situated on the Niagara River, just across the river from Canada. The Niagara River intersects the Niagara Escarpment between Lewiston and Queenston, Ontario, identifying the escarpment's Lewiston-Queenston section as the geologic origin of Niagara Falls. Over a roughly 12,500 year span, the falls have eroded nearly seven miles south from Lewiston to their present location in Niagara Falls, creating the seven-mile long Niagara Gorge. Lewiston lies halfway between the world-famous Niagara Falls and historic Fort Niagara in Youngstown. Niagara Falls is approximately a ten-minute drive to the south. Visitors from Canada can take the Lewiston-Queenston Bridge across the Niagara River.

Popular summer festivals include the Lewiston Art Festival (the second weekend in August) and the Northwest Jazz Festival (the last weekend in August). The famous Niagara County Peach Festival takes place during the second weekend of September. Several other festivals, such as the Harvest and Hops Festival, take place during the year. Most are held on or near Center Street, the Village's main street (18F North).

Lewiston recently won an online voting contest sponsored by USA Today and Rand McNally for "Best for Food" small town in America, beating 176 other communities. Lewiston has over 30 locally owned and operated restaurant/food establishments within a mile, primarily on Center Street, catering to a variety of tastes. It was also designated in the same contest as one of the "Top Ten Best Small Towns in America."

== History ==
Various cultures of Native American tribes inhabited the Lewiston area for thousands of years, with the earliest known artifacts dating to 5000 B.C. By the 14th century, Iroquoian-speaking peoples inhabited the area. Before the mid-17th century, they had coalesced into the Five Nations, the historic Iroquois tribes of the Haudenosaunee based in present-day New York. In the early 18th century, they were joined by the Iroquoian Tuscarora from the South, who centuries before had migrated from the Great Lakes area to North Carolina. In 1722, the Iroquois accepted the Tuscarora as the Sixth Nation of the confederacy. The Tuscarora had a village here before the American Revolutionary War called Yehęwakwáʼthaʼ.

During the war, Tuscarora and Oneida Iroquois bands allied individually with the colonists or the British. Those who allied with the British went north with Joseph Brant before the end of the war and are part of the Six Nations of the Grand River First Nation in Ontario. Those allied with the American colonists stayed in New York. The Tuscarora Nation of New York is federally recognized and has occupied a reservation at Lewiston since the early 19th century, although in the 1950s state and federal authorities took 22% of their reservation by eminent domain to construct what is now the Robert Moses Power Plant reservoir.

The Village of Lewiston (formerly known as The Landing) was the site of the first European settlement in western New York in 1720, where trading started along the river. French explorers arriving from Canada across the river had visited the area as early as 1615. The village, incorporated in 1822, claims to be the "most historic square mile in America". It was named after Morgan Lewis, the 3rd Governor of New York.

In addition to its ancient indigenous settlement, Lewiston became historically significant during European development of North America, and strategic in United States and Canadian history. It was the site from which the US invaded Canada in the Battle of Queenston Heights which took place October 13, 1812. It was the first major battle of the War of 1812. A commemorative sign marks the location where the American force embarked to cross the Niagara River. After the Americans lost the battle, a British retaliatory raid in December 1813 burned Lewiston to the ground and killed several civilians. While most American militia deserted, the local Tuscarora natives stood and fought a delaying action which bought enough time for the surviving citizens to escape. The Historical Association has constructed a large scale bronze monument of thanksgiving to the Tuscaroras entitled Tuscarora Heroes Monument that was unveiled on the 200th anniversary of the attack on December 19, 2013.

The earliest recorded railway in the United States was an inclined wooden tramway built here in 1764 by John Montresor (1736–1799), a British military engineer. Called "The Cradles" and "The Old Lewiston Incline," it featured loaded carts pulled up wooden rails by rope. It promoted the movement of goods over the Niagara Escarpment in present-day Lewiston.

For many African Americans escaping slavery in the 1840s and 1850s, Lewiston was the final stop on the Underground Railroad before they crossed the Niagara River to freedom in Canada. Lewiston is the setting for the book, Freedom Crossing, by Margaret Goff Clark. Many schools use the book as required reading for thousands of grade school students across the United States as they learn about the Underground Railroad movement. The Historical Association of Lewiston has prepared a "Freedom Crossing Study Guide". They dedicated the Freedom Crossing Monument on October 14, 2009. The large-scale bronze monument stands on the bank of the Niagara River.

Catherine Hustler was credited with inventing the "cocktail" mixed drink in Lewiston in the 19th century. She was featured as a character in James Fenimore Cooper's novel The Spy: A Tale of the Neutral Ground. Built in 1824, the Frontier House was known for a time as the finest hotel in the United States west of the Hudson River. Lewiston was a trading center on the Niagara River. As economic development changed, it became a destination for recreation and vacationers.

Lewiston has completed a multi-million dollar upgrade of its business district, which has been renovated with brick sidewalks and period lanterns. Its waterfront park is also being improved with more green space and additional parking. A new landmark hotel has just been opened near the waterfront. The village has a number of properties listed on the National Register of Historic Places. These have contributed to the sense of place that anchors the village and formed the base of its main street renovation.

Tourists and visitors flock to Lewiston, primarily in the summertime, to enjoy its many festivals, fine restaurants, Artpark, and to learn about its history. Thousands enjoy taking the Whirlpool Jet Boat ride, which shoots through the Niagara River Class 5 rapids and is considered one of the top five adventure rides in North America.

In proximity to the Village of Lewiston, a 710-acre (2.9 km^{2}) hazardous chemical waste landfill is privately operated on land within the towns of Lewiston and Porter. The company is paid to accept hazardous wastes from jurisdictions across the state and is regulated by the state. It is the only such landfill left in the northeastern United States. Nearby is the former Army Ordnance Depot, which has a landfill containing heavy metal contamination, as well as radioactive material from the Manhattan Project of World War II, conducted at Tonawanda, New York. This landfill is supervised by the Army Corps of Engineers (COE).

== Geography ==
Center Street in Lewiston

According to the United States Census Bureau, the village has an area of 1.2 square miles (3.1 km^{2}), of which 1.1 square miles (2.8 km^{2}) is land and 0.1 square miles (0.26 km^{2}) (9.32%) is water.

Lewiston is a Niagara River community, north of Niagara Falls. Across the river is the town of Niagara-on-the-Lake in Ontario, Canada. The formation of Niagara Falls began between what is now Town of Niagara-on-the-Lake and Village of Lewiston, approximately 12,000 years ago. Since then, the falls have moved seven miles (11 km) south along the river due to erosion of land.

New York's historic Ridge Road begins in Lewiston. New York State Route 18F and New York State Route 18 have termini here, both at New York State Route 104. The Niagara Scenic Parkway runs north and south along the village's eastern edge.

Lewiston is also located 6.2 miles of the area's international historic treasure Old Fort Niagara - oldfortniagara.org in Fort Niagara State Park, which is located in the Village of Youngstown, NY.

== Demographics ==
Historical population
Census	Pop.	Note	%±
1860	1,160		—
1870	770		−33.6%
1880	680		−11.7%
1890	633		−6.9%
1900	697		10.1%
1910	713		2.3%
1920	723		1.4%
1930	1,013		40.1%
1940	1,280		26.4%
1950	1,626		27.0%
1960	3,320		104.2%
1970	3,292		−0.8%
1980	3,326		1.0%
1990	3,048		−8.4%
2000	2,781		−8.8%
2010	2,701		−2.9%
2020	2,531		−6.3%
U.S. Decennial Census

As of the census of 2000, there were 2,781 people, 1,268 households, and 735 families residing in the village. The population density was 2,610.3 inhabitants per square mile (1,007.8/km^{2}). There were 1,351 housing units at an average density of 487.5 persons per square kilometre (1,263 persons/mi^{2}). The racial makeup of the village was 98.53% White, 0.11% African American, 0.54% Native American, 0.36% Asian, 0.04% Pacific Islander, 0.04% from other races, and 0.40% from two or more races. 0.58% of the population were Hispanic or Latino of any race.

There were 1,268 households, out of which 21.1% had children under the age of 18 living with them, 45.9% were married couples living together, 8.5% have a woman whose husband does not live with her, and 42.0% were non-families. 37.5% of all households were made up of individuals, and 18.5% had someone living alone who was 65 years of age or older. The average household size was 2.11 and the average family size was 2.79.

== Notable architecture ==
The residence at 810 Center Street, which became the Clarkson House, was among the first structures added as the village was rebuilt after being burnt to the ground during the War of 1812.

The following are listed on the National Register of Historic Places:

- Lewiston Mound
- Lower Landing Archeological District
- Frontier House

== Environmental issues ==
Nearby, within the towns of Lewiston and Porter, are two major landfills for handling hazardous materials:

- The Chemical Waste Management Hazardous Waste Landfill, the only hazardous chemical waste landfill in the northeastern United States.
- The Lake Ontario Ordnance Works, a former Army Ordnance Depot, which contains land contaminated from its operations.
- The Niagara Falls Storage Site which contains radioactive material from part of the Manhattan Project conducted at Tonawanda, New York.

== Government ==
The Town of Lewiston (est. 1818), which includes the Village, has a population of more than 16,000 people. The town supervisor is Steve Broderick. The village mayor is Anne Welch.

Lewiston's public library is part of a regional library system. The Nioga Library System is a three-county non-profit cooperative library system serving the public libraries in three counties (Niagara, Orleans, and Genesee).
