= Niagara Scenic Parkway =

Highway in New York

Niagara Scenic Parkway
- Map of the Niagara Region with the Niagara Scenic Parkway and the branch west to Fort Niagara highlighted in red

Route information
- Maintained by NYSDOT
- Existed: June 9, 2016–present
- History: Known as the Robert Moses State Parkway from 1964–June 9, 2016

Southern segment
- Length: 3.24 mi (5.21 km)
- South end: I-190 / NY 324 / NY 384 / LaSalle Expressway in Niagara Falls
- North end: NY 384 in Niagara Falls

Northern segment
- Length: 13.3 mi (21.4 km)
- South end: Findlay Drive / Whirlpool Street in Niagara Falls
- Major intersections: NY 18F / NY 104 in Lewiston
- North end: NY 18 in Porter

Location
- Country: United States
- State: New York
- Counties: Niagara

Highway system
- New York Highways; Interstate; US; State; Reference; Parkways

The Niagara Scenic Parkway (known as the Robert Moses State Parkway until 2016) is a 16.4-mile (26.39 km) limited-access parkway in western Niagara County, New York, in the United States. Its southern terminus is at the LaSalle Expressway on the east bank of the Niagara River in Niagara Falls. The northern terminus is at New York State Route 18 (NY 18) at Four Mile Creek State Park in Porter near Lake Ontario.

Originally, the parkway was one continuous road; however, due to low usage, a portion of the parkway near Niagara Falls was removed in two phases in the early 1980s and in 2019–2020, separating the parkway into two sections.

The parkway, a four-lane freeway for most of its route, is one of the most unorthodox parkways in New York State, similar to Ocean Parkway on Long Island. The portion between downtown Niagara Falls and Lewiston is two lanes and undivided, and the parkway as a whole has gradually been relegated due to low usage.

The length of the parkway is designated as New York State Route 957A by the New York State Department of Transportation (NYSDOT). A 1.16-mile (1.87 km) long spur connecting the Niagara Scenic Parkway to Fort Niagara State Park near Youngstown is designated as New York State Route 958A. Both reference route designations are unsigned.

== Route description ==
The Niagara Scenic Parkway begins as a westward continuation of a spur off the LaSalle Expressway in Niagara Falls, New York. It connects with Interstate 190 (I-190) and NY 384 just west of its official southern terminus and passes under the North Grand Island Bridge as it heads west along the Niagara River as a four-lane freeway. Three miles (5 km) west of I-190, the parkway turns north and returns to grade level at Buffalo Avenue, where it terminates and continues north as John B. Daly Boulevard (designated but not signed as NY 952B by NYSDOT).

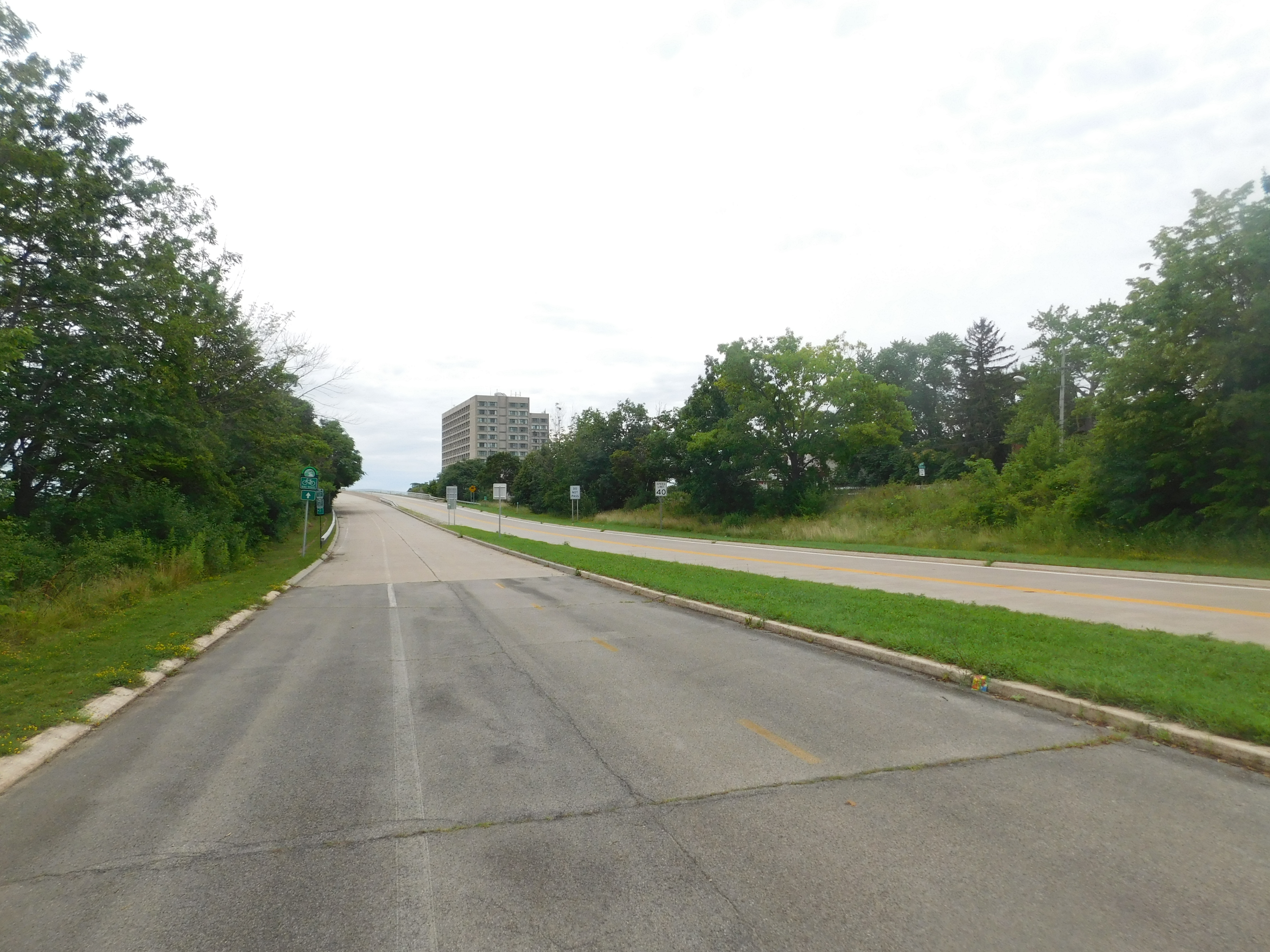
The Niagara Scenic Parkway in Niagara Falls from the trail portion of the southbound roadway

The parkway begins again as a two-lane expressway at Findlay Drive just before Whirlpool State Park. North of the park, the highway curves northeastward, matching the curvature of the gorge in the area. After serving the Devil's Hole State Park and intersecting NY 104, it passes over the Robert Moses Niagara Power Plant. Many features are within view at this point: to the west of the parkway at this point are the Sir Adam Beck Hydroelectric Power Stations; to the north are the Lewiston–Queenston Bridge and the Niagara River's course for miles ahead. The parkway has entrance ramps from I-190 via Upper Mountain Road before passing under the bridge and becoming to a four-lane freeway again.

Just north of the bridge, the Niagara Scenic Parkway approaches the edge of the Niagara Escarpment. Here, it is possible to see for several miles in any direction. Looking north, the remainder of the Niagara River can be seen, as can its mouth at Lake Ontario. The parkway descends the escarpment and meets NY 18F and NY 104 just east of the village of Lewiston. North of Lewiston, the Parkway follows a largely north–south routing as it passes through largely rural sections of the towns of Lewiston and Porter. During this stretch, it has an exit to Pletcher Road, which links the parkway to Joseph Davis State Park.

At the village of Youngstown, the Niagara Scenic Parkway interchanges with NY 93. North of the village, the parkway's median widens as it interchanges with a short spur (designated but not signed as NY 958A) leading to Fort Niagara State Park and Fort Niagara within. Past this junction, the parkway turns east and begins to parallel Lake Ontario. It passes under NY 18F and interchanges with Four Mile Creek Drive, the entry road for Four Mile Creek State Park, before terminating at an at-grade intersection with NY 18. The New York State Office of Parks, Recreation and Historic Preservation has jurisdiction over the parkway and its spur to Fort Niagara; however, NYSDOT maintains both highways.

== History ==
Robert Moses State Parkway
- Location: Niagara Falls–Porter
- Existed: 1964–June 9, 2016

=== Construction ===
Proposals for a freeway to connect downtown Niagara Falls with the proposed Niagara Thruway, a spur of the New York State Thruway, surfaced by the 1950s. The general routing of the highway would begin at the Rainbow Bridge in downtown and parallel NY 384 on its north side to the North Grand Island Bridge, where it would turn south to meet the northern terminus of the Niagara Thruway. However, by the 1960s, a new alignment along the bank of the Niagara River and through the Niagara Falls State Park was selected instead. Two portions of the "Niagara Parkway", as it was then known, were completed by 1962. The first extended from the Niagara Thruway (Interstate 190) to the Rainbow Bridge. Another, representing a northward extension of the parkway, was open along the Niagara Gorge's eastern edge from Niagara Avenue to U.S. Route 104 in Lewiston. At the time, the sections from the Rainbow Bridge to Niagara Street and US 104 to Ridge Road in Lewiston were under construction. Both were open to traffic by 1964. An extension of the parkway, formerly named the "Robert Moses State Parkway" after public works developer Robert Moses, now named the Niagara Scenic Parkway, north to NY 18 in Porter was completed by 1968. A spur to Fort Niagara was built as part of the extension.

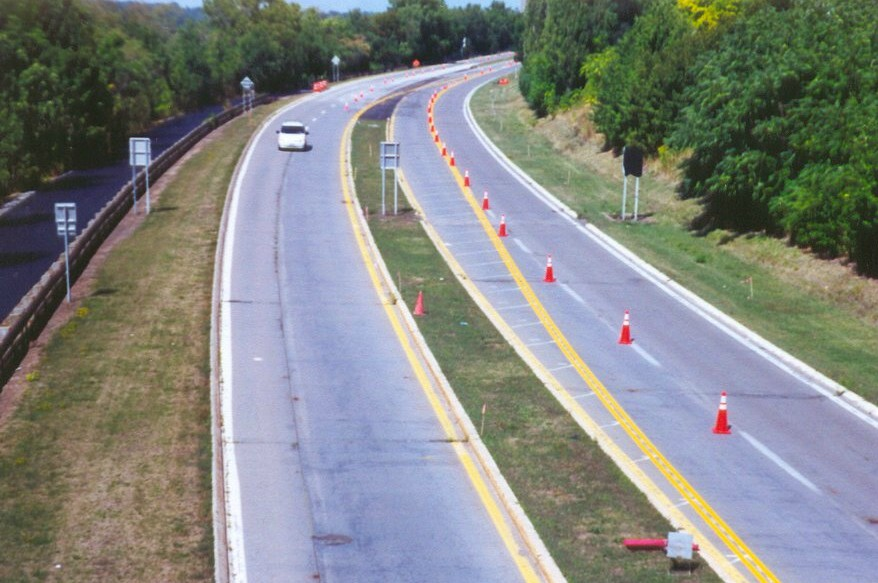
Looking north at the parkway from the pedestrian bridge near the Aquarium of Niagara. This part was undergoing a partial conversion into a recreation trail in 2001

The Niagara Scenic Parkway was to have been part of a vast network of freeways in the Buffalo area. Under the 1971 Regional Highway Plan for the Buffalo–Niagara Falls area, the parkway would have been paralleled by a westward extension of the LaSalle Expressway, which would have extended from the Rainbow Bridge to I-190 along the proposed routing shown on maps 20 years before. Farther north, the northern end of the Niagara Scenic Parkway in Porter would have linked to a western extension of the Lake Ontario State Parkway. Neither proposal ever came to fruition.

=== Downgrading ===
The portion of the Niagara Scenic Parkway within Niagara Falls State Park was closed and largely removed in the early 1980s as a result of a movement to restore the park to the original layout conceived for it by landscape architect Frederick Law Olmsted. As a result, the parkway became discontinuous. Its southern segment began at the pre-existing interchange with Quay Street (John B. Daly Boulevard), which remained virtually untouched, while the southern end of the northern segment was reconfigured in the vicinity of downtown to terminate at an at-grade intersection with Main Street (NY 104). The portions of the Niagara Scenic Parkway that still exist within Niagara Falls State Park are mostly in the vicinity of the Rainbow Bridge and are used for park business only.

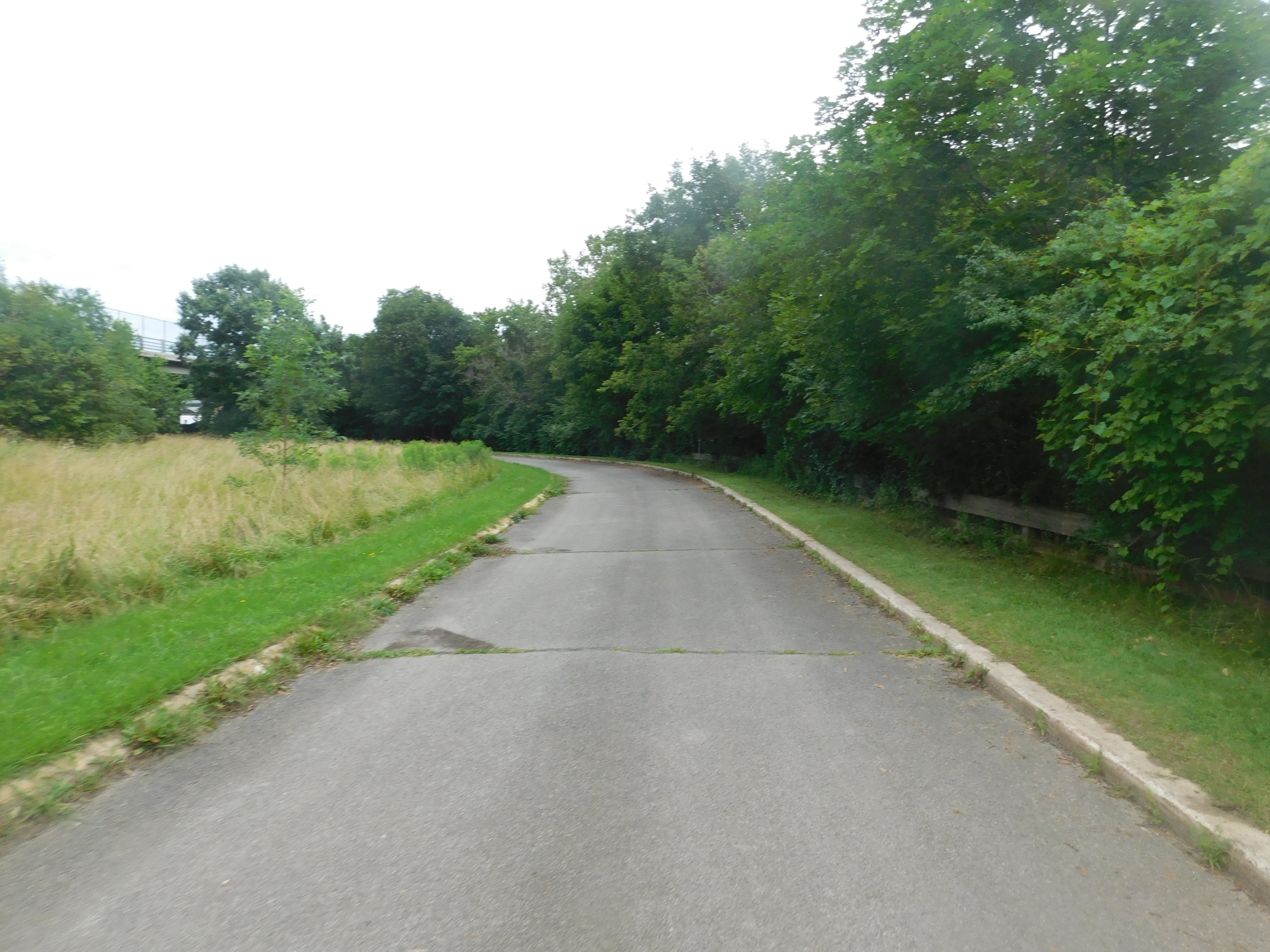
Abandoned ramps from the Niagara Scenic Parkway to Whirlpool Street and NY 182 in Niagara Falls

Additional downgrading of the highway has occurred in other areas. From Cedar Avenue in downtown Niagara Falls to I-190 in Lewiston, the southbound lanes were gradually converted into a recreation/bike trail during the 2000s, funneling all traffic into the former northbound lanes and turning the parkway into a two-lane undivided road.

In February 2013, New York State announced that another segment of the parkway from Main Street north to Findlay Drive would be removed, allowing improved access by residents and tourists on the city streets to the gorgefront. In early 2019, the stretch of parkway between Main Street (NY 104) and Findlay Drive was permanently closed and demolition began starting with the section of viaduct near the Whirlpool Rapids Bridge which was removed in mid-2019. Engineering work for the removal of the first section began in April 2014. By July 2020, the section between Main Street and Findlay Drive was fully removed, and is set to be replaced by park land complete with bicycle and pedestrian paths. Removal of a further stretch from Findlay north to the NY 104/18F interchange in Lewiston was also discussed at the time, but not implemented.

Between 2014 and 2016, the Riverway Project, part of the Buffalo Billion state program, reconstructed and reconfigured a one-mile stretch of the parkway near Goat Island. This included conversion of the John B. Daly Boulevard interchange into a roundabout which opened May 2015.

On June 9, 2016, Governor Andrew Cuomo announced that the Robert Moses State Parkway would be renamed the Niagara Scenic Parkway.

== Exit list ==
The entire route is in Niagara County. All exits are unnumbered.

Location	mi	km	Destinations	Notes
Niagara Falls	0.00	0.00	LaSalle Expressway east to NY 265 – Tonawanda	Southern terminus
Niagara Falls	0.02	0.032	I-190 (NY 324 east) / NY 384 (Buffalo Avenue) – Buffalo, Lewiston	Southbound exit and northbound entrance; exit 21 on I-190
Niagara Falls	3.24	5.21	NY 384 (Buffalo Avenue)	Roundabout; northern terminus; access via NY 952B
Niagara Falls	Gap in route			
Niagara Falls	5.04	8.11	Findlay Drive / Whirlpool Street	Southern terminus; at-grade intersection
Town of Lewiston	9.68	15.58	NY 18F north / NY 104 (Ridge Road) – Lewiston Artpark	Southern terminus of NY 18F
Town of Lewiston	12.37	19.91	Pletcher Road – Joseph Davis State Park	
Youngstown	15.51	24.96	NY 93 – Youngstown	
Youngstown	15.94	25.65	To NY 18F – Fort Niagara	Access via NY 958A
Porter	18.09	29.11	Four Mile Creek State Campsite	Northbound exit and southbound entrance; access via Park Road
Porter	18.42	29.64	NY 18 (Lake Road)	Northern terminus; at-grade intersection
1.000 mi = 1.609 km; 1.000 km = 0.621 mi: Incomplete access

=== NY 958A ===
The entire route is in Porter, Niagara County. All exits are unnumbered.

mi	km	Destinations	Notes
0.00	0.00	Niagara Scenic Parkway to I-190 / NY 18 – Four Mile Creek State Campsite, Niagara Falls	Southern terminus
		NY 18F – Youngstown	Northbound access is via center median u-turn ramp
1.16	1.87	Fort Niagara State Park	Northern terminus
1.000 mi = 1.609 km; 1.000 km = 0.621 mi

== See also ==
- Niagara Parkway, the longer counterpart to the Niagara Scenic Parkway on the Ontario side of the Niagara River
