= New York State Route 18F =

Highway in New York

New York State Route 18F
- Map of the Buffalo–Niagara Falls area with NY 18F highlighted in red

Route information
- Auxiliary route of NY 18
- Maintained by NYSDOT, Niagara County, and the town of Porter
- Length: 9.80 mi (15.77 km)
- Existed: January 1, 1949–present
- Tourist routes: Great Lakes Seaway Trail

Major junctions
- South end: NY 104 / Niagara Scenic Parkway in Lewiston
- NY 958A in Porter
- North end: NY 18 in Porter

Location
- Country: United States
- State: New York
- Counties: Niagara

Highway system
- New York Highways; Interstate; US; State; Reference; Parkways
← NY 18D	→ NY 19

New York State Route 18F (NY 18F) is a 9.80-mile (15.77 km) long state highway in northwestern Niagara County, New York, in the United States. The southern terminus of the route is at an interchange with NY 104 and the Niagara Scenic Parkway just east of the village of Lewiston. The northern terminus is at an intersection with NY 18 near Four Mile Creek State Park in Porter. NY 18F parallels NY 18 for most of its alignment, taking a more westerly course than its parent. NY 18F is the only remaining suffixed route of NY 18.

The portion of modern NY 18F south of Youngstown was originally designated as part of NY 34 in 1924; however, NY 34 was absorbed into NY 18 as part of the 1930 renumbering of state highways in New York. The change was part of a larger extension of NY 18 east to Rochester. NY 18 was realigned in 1949 to follow its modern alignment between Lewiston and Lake Ontario, at which time its former routing alongside the Niagara River became NY 18F.

== Route description ==
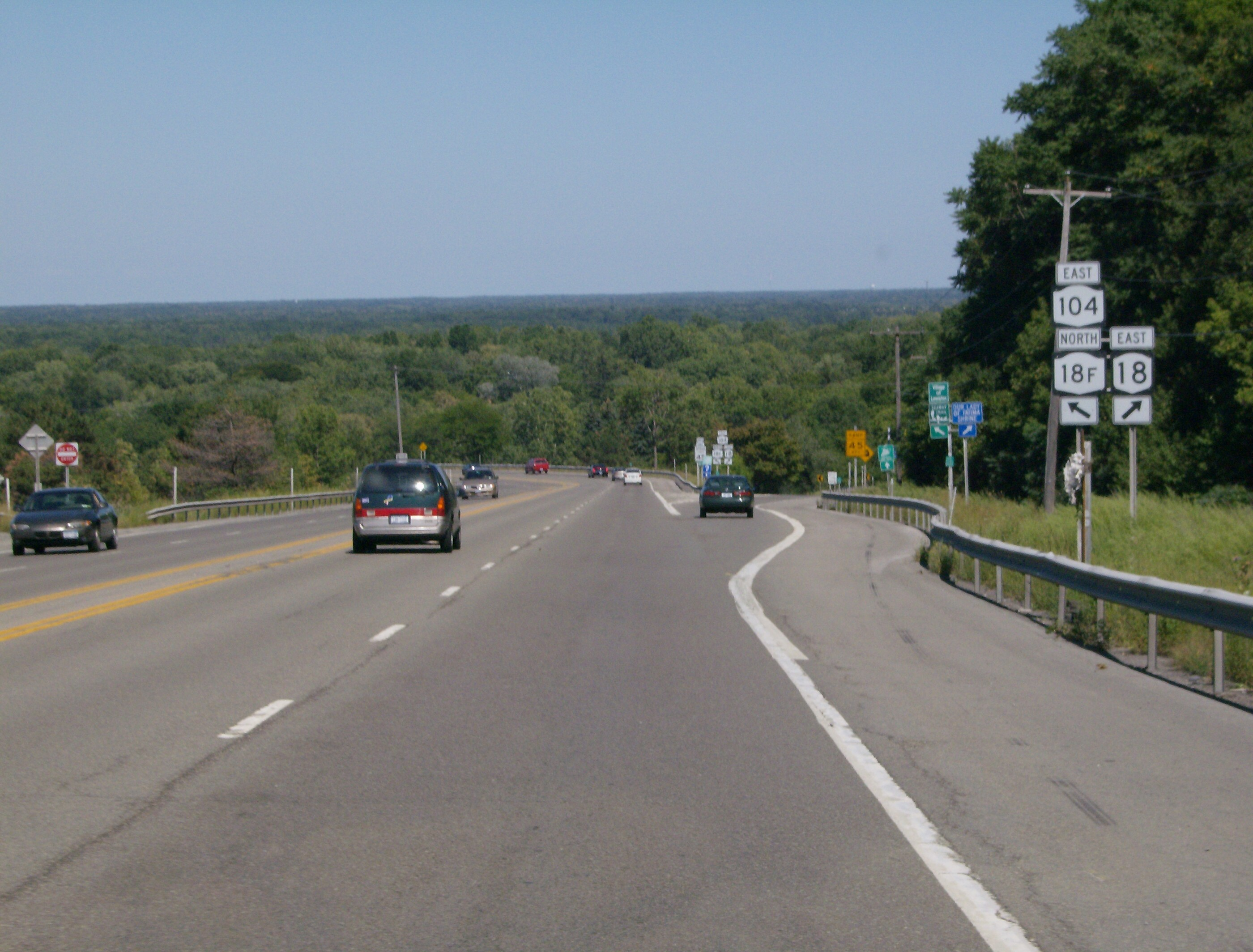
Erroneous NY 18F signage on NY 104

Officially, NY 18F begins at the eastern edge of the village of Lewiston at an interchange between NY 104 and the Niagara Scenic Parkway. Signage for NY 18F, however, exists as far south as the interchange between NY 104 and NY 18 south of the village. According to signage, NY 18F is concurrent to NY 104 from NY 18 north to the interchange between NY 104 and the Moses Parkway, where NY 18F and NY 104 split at the western extent of the interchange. The Seaway Trail, routed along NY 104 from Niagara Falls north to Lewiston, follows NY 18F west into Lewiston along the path of Ridge Road, here named Center Street. At 4th Street, NY 18F turns northward, following 4th Street for four blocks to Oneida Street. NY 18F cuts west on Oneida for two blocks before continuing northward out of the village on 2nd Street.

North of the Lewiston village limits, NY 18F is the closest roadway to the Niagara River, a trait reflected in its name of Lower River Road. As it progresses northward along the eastern bank of the river, NY 18F parallels both the Niagara Scenic State Parkway and NY 18. At Stella Niagara, NY 18F meets Pletcher Road, the first road north of Lewiston that provides a connection to all three roadways. NY 18F continues on, passing through the western extent of Joseph Davis State Park south of the village of Youngstown in the town of Lewiston. In Youngstown, NY 18F becomes Main Street and intersects the western terminus of NY 93 in the village center. At the northern fringe of the community, NY 18F intersects the southern entrance to the Fort Niagara State Park. NY 18F bypasses the park, turning east onto Jackson Street, then north onto Lake Road as it follows the perimeter of the park.

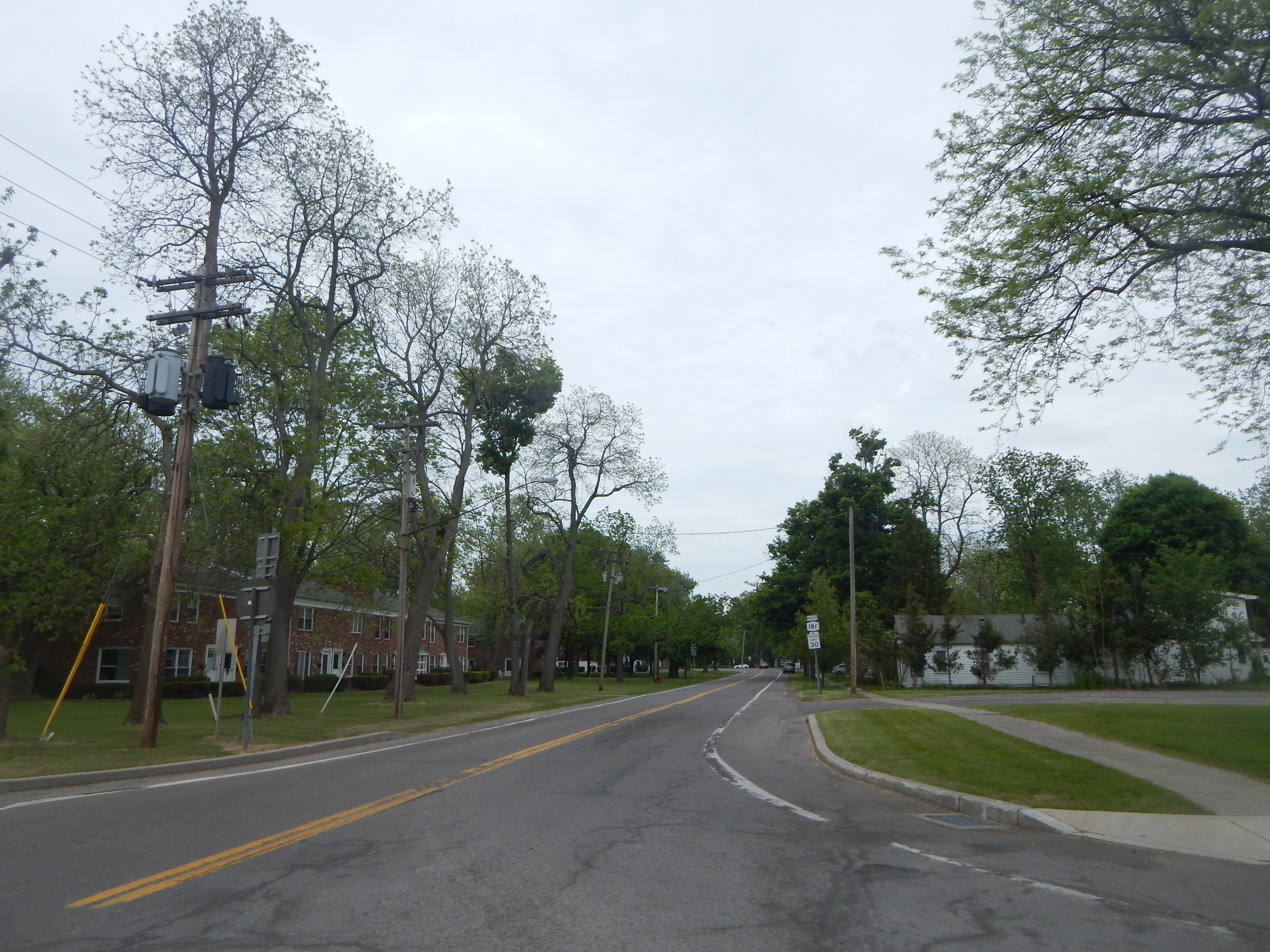
NY 18F heading east from Fort Niagara State Park entrance

Near the Lake Ontario shoreline, NY 18F connects to the Fort Niagara spur (NY 958A) of the Niagara Scenic State Parkway via a partial diamond interchange. Past the exit, NY 18F turns east and begins to parallel the lakeshore. The route also parallels the mainline Moses Parkway for a short distance before curving south to cross over the parkway and terminate at NY 18 in the vicinity of Four Mile Creek State Park in Porter.

Ownership and maintenance of NY 18F is split between three different entities. The section of NY 18F from Center Street in Lewiston to the northern village line of Youngstown is maintained by Niagara County. From Main Street in Youngstown to the northern village line, NY 18F is concurrent to the unsigned County Route 138 (CR 138); the remainder of the county-maintained segment is co-designated as CR 907. All of NY 18F north of Youngstown is maintained by the town of Porter while the rest—Center Street between NY 104 and 4th Street—is maintained by the New York State Department of Transportation.

== History ==
All of what is now NY 18F south of Youngstown was originally designated as part of NY 34 in 1924. In the 1930 renumbering of state highways in New York, NY 34 became part of NY 18, which was extended north to Youngstown and east to Rochester as part of the renumbering. NY 18 was originally state-maintained from the village of Lewiston to Youngstown; however, the state of New York relinquished ownership and maintenance of NY 18 between Center Street in Lewiston and the village of Youngstown on July 24, 1947. The section within the village of Lewiston was transferred to village control, while the remainder of the route was given to Niagara County. In December 1947, Lewiston petitioned the county to also assume maintenance of the portion of NY 18 within the village; the request was eventually granted.

On January 1, 1949, NY 18 was realigned to follow a more inland routing between the village of Lewiston and what is now Four Mile Creek State Park. The former riverside and lakeside routing of NY 18 between the two locations was redesignated as NY 18F. At the time, NY 18F was one of five spur routes of NY 18, which at the time extended southward to the Pennsylvania state line. NY 18A, NY 18B, and NY 18D were assigned to spurs of NY 18 south of Lewiston, while NY 18E was assigned to a spur of NY 18 in the village of Lewiston that connected the village to the second Queenston–Lewiston Bridge. When NY 18 was truncated to Lewiston on January 1, 1962,, NY 18A, NY 18B, and NY 18D were either renumbered or absorbed by pre-existing routes. NY 18E also ceased to exist around this time as the Queenston–Lewiston Bridge was removed and replaced with the modern Lewiston–Queenston Bridge just upstream.

== Major intersections ==
The entire route is in Niagara County.

Location	mi	km	Destinations	Notes
Village of Lewiston	0.00	0.00	NY 104 / Niagara Scenic Parkway / Great Lakes Seaway Trail to I-190 – Canada, Buffalo, Niagara Falls, Fort Niagara	Southern terminus; interchange
Youngstown	6.38	10.27	NY 93 east (Lockport Street)	Western terminus of NY 93
Porter			To Niagara Scenic Parkway – Fort Niagara, Niagara Falls, 4 Mile Creek State Campsite	Interchange; access via NY 958A
Porter	9.80	15.77	NY 18 / Great Lakes Seaway Trail – Wilson, Lewiston	Northern terminus
1.000 mi = 1.609 km; 1.000 km = 0.621 mi

== See also ==
- List of county routes in Niagara County, New York
