= Tuscarora Heroes Monument =

Coordinates: 43.172294°N 79.034622°W

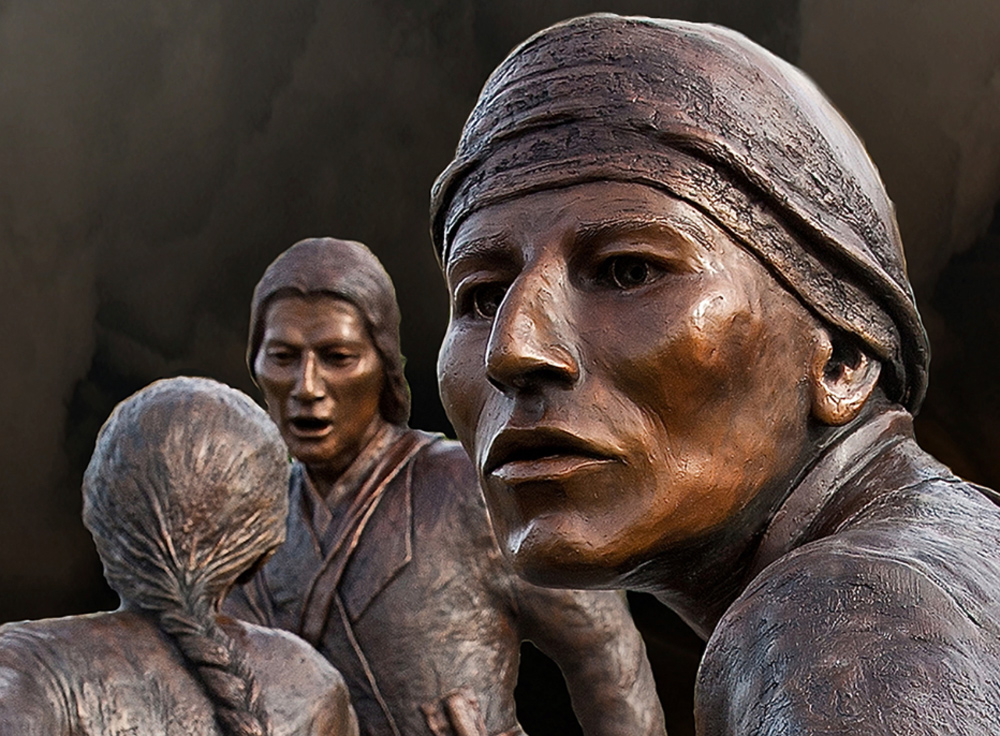
Tuscarora Heroes Monument

Tuscarora Heroes Monument is located in Lewiston, New York and stands as a testament of thanksgiving from the people of Lewiston to the Tuscarora Nation for saving the lives of dozens of local residents during the War of 1812 British attack on December 19, 1813. It consists of three 110% lifesize bronze sculptures that depict a tableau of two Tuscarora men rescuing a local woman and her baby from the British attack.

It is recognized as the largest War of 1812 bicentennial monument project in the United States.

Primary funding was provided by the Town of Lewiston using Niagara River Greenway funds, along with Niagara County, New York (also with Greenway funds), the KeyBank Foundation, the Margaret L. Wendt Foundation, the Niagara Falls National Heritage Area, and the Daughters of 1812. The Village of Lewiston allowed the use of its park property to locate the monument.

== Concept and Design ==
The monument project was conceived, planned and organized by an all-volunteer committee from the Historical Association of Lewiston, NY, which also raised all the funds. The committee was led by Lewiston's 1812 Bicentennial volunteer director, Lee Simonson, who advanced the idea of a tribute to the Tuscaroras in 2009 as one of two major bicentennial projects for the group to undertake, the other being the reenactment of the Battle of Queenston Heights.

Because the significance of the Tuscarora intervention in the attack was relatively unknown, Simonson wrote the book, "Tuscarora Heroes", detailing the history and circumstances of the British attack and subsequent Tuscarora action. The book was published in March 2010 by the Historical Association of Lewiston and was introduced at an April 2010 press conference, along with a small clay model of the proposed monument by artist Susan Geissler. Geissler had received widespread acclaim for her sculpture work on Lewiston's Freedom Crossing Monument which had just been unveiled in October 2009.

While the original sculpture concept design remained relatively unchanged, the platform where the sculptures were to be mounted underwent several major revisions, culminating in the final turtle design with stone pillars supporting a suspended bronze plaque that lists the names of the known Tuscarora Heroes, along with the names of those killed in the attack. A colorful interpretive Seaway Trail sign, with a historical timeline and map, is also at the site and provides a detailed history.

== Unveiling ==
Thousands of spectators viewed the unveiling ceremony on December 19, 2013, the Bicentennial of the Tuscarora action. The monument was unveiled during the final "Flames Through Lewiston" event which featured hundreds of volunteer American, British, and native re-enactors. About a dozen Tuscarorans portrayed the Tuscarora Heroes and Sacarissa Chief Leo Henry played the role of his predecessor, Chief Solomon Longboard, the leader of the Tuscarora Heroes in 1813.

Local civilians of all ages reenacted the panicked exodus from Lewiston by its residents 200 years earlier. Re-enactors, dressed in only pajamas and blankets, ran for their lives down the same street their Lewiston predecessors used to escape the attackers. Some civilians were killed on the street by British natives as was the case in the real attack.

== Symbolism ==
The monument site has several symbolic aspects. The sculptures are mounted on stamped form concrete in the shape of a large turtle's back. The Iroquois believe that the world was created on a turtle's back. The turtle's head points toward the American flag representing the American-Tuscaroran alliance since the American Revolution. Six northern white pine trees surrounding the sculptures represent the six nations of the Iroquois Confederacy. The Iroquois flag also flies at the site.

== The Tuscarora Heroes Story ==
In the early morning of December 19, 1813, the citizens of Lewiston, New York, awoke to unimaginable horrors. The small frontier village, situated on the Niagara River on the border between the United States and Canada, suddenly found itself on the front line of a vicious international war.

Hours earlier, in the middle of the night, British-Canadian troops had invaded the United States and captured Fort Niagara without firing a shot. The British-Canadians, along with their unrestrained “Western Indian” allies, ran down River Road toward Lewiston, armed with torches, guns and tomahawks, intent on retribution and turning Lewiston into a pile of ashes. Poorly defended, Lewiston citizens were on their own. They could only run for their lives through the snow and mud in hopes of escaping the atrocities. Civilians were murdered in the rampage and tormented parents found themselves helpless in trying to save their children — one 7-year-old was shot and scalped in front of his mother’s eyes.

At the moment when Lewiston citizens had lost hope and thought they would all become victims of a bloody and merciless massacre, the local Tuscarora men ran down from their village atop the Escarpment and offered the first resistance the enemy had seen. Their ingenious and diversionary tactics gave the impression that “their numbers were legion.” Fearing a trap, the enemy stopped in its tracks.

Despite being outnumbered 30 to 1, the Tuscaroras were able to buy the escaping residents enough time to get out of harm’s way.

== Tuscarora Heroes Monument Trivia ==
Despite multi-year efforts by the local volunteers to get the federal and New York State governments to offer some kind of special medal or award to the Tuscaroras, neither was forthcoming. However, financial support was received from the Niagara Falls National Heritage Area, an arm of the National Park Service.

The GPS coordinates of the location where the Tuscaroras are believed to have first intervened in the attack are engraved on the leg of the largest sculpture.

The total cost of the bronze monument and plaza was $352,000.

The Village of Lewiston, NY, donated public property for the monument on the southwest corner of Portage Road and Center Street.

Three webcams broadcast streaming video from the monument site can be accessed at the Historical Association of Lewiston Inc. website.

A time capsule, to be opened in 2213, was entombed in one of the pillars.

Commemorative coins and stamps were released in honor of the Tuscarora Heroes bicentennial. A hardcover book, chronicling the monument project, was also released by the Historical Association in early 2014.
