= Clarkson House =

Clarkson House may refer to:

- Clarkson House (Flaherty, Kentucky), listed on the U.S. National Register of Historic Places (NRHP)
- Clarkson House (Lewiston, New York), NRHP-listed
- Clarkson-Knowles Cottage, Potsdam, New York, NRHP-listed
- Clarkson-Watson House, Philadelphia, Pennsylvania, NRHP-listed
