= Colonial Village, New York =

Hamlet in the state of New York, United States

Coordinates: 43°08′06″N 78°57′57″W

Colonial Village is a hamlet in the town of Lewiston in Niagara County, New York, United States, North America.
