= St. John's Episcopal Church (Youngstown, New York) =

Historic church in New York, United States

- U.S. National Register of Historic Places
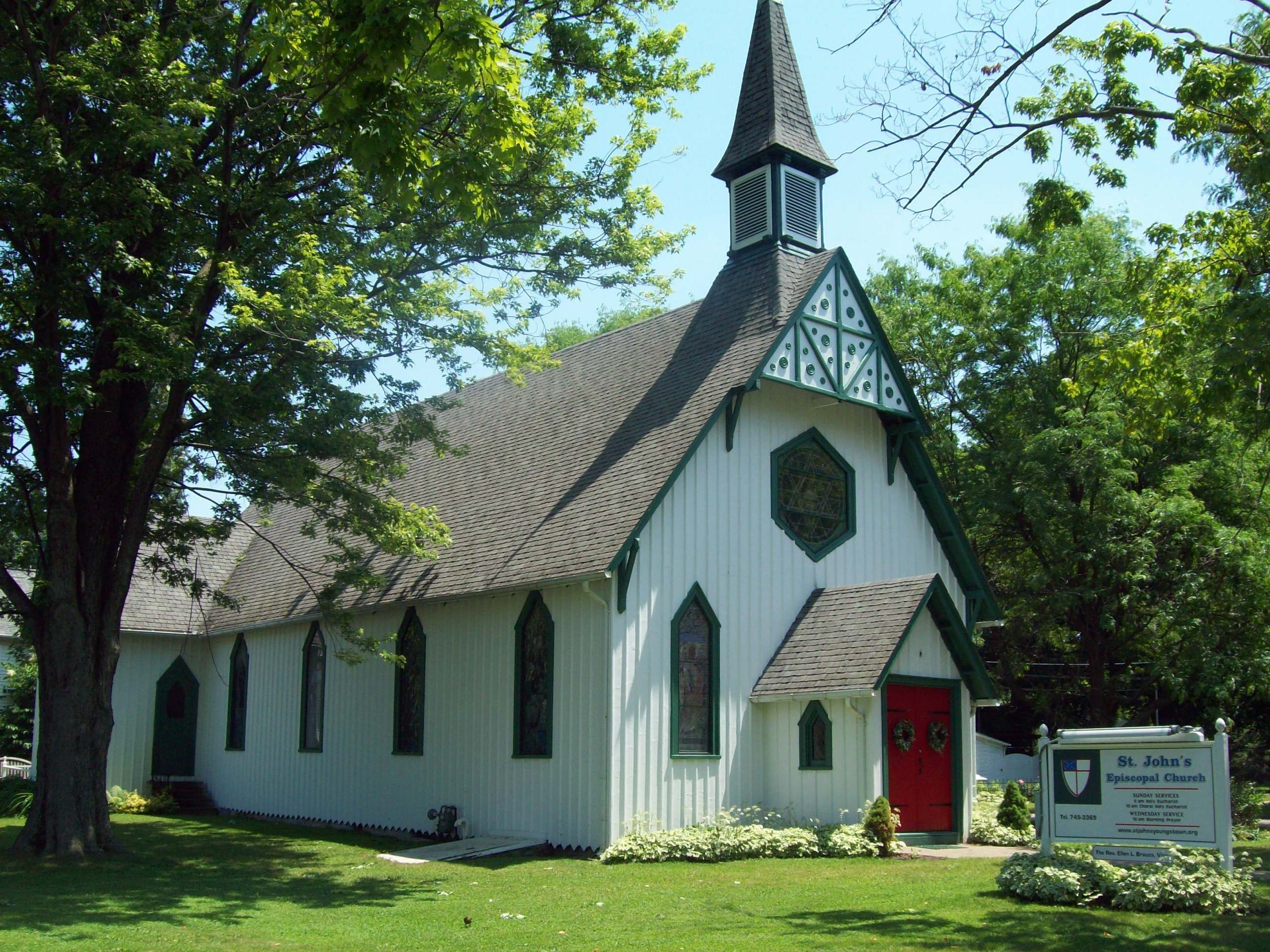
- St. Johns Episcopal Church, June 2009

- Location within New York Location within the United States
- Location: 117 Main St., Youngstown, New York
- Coordinates: 43°15′13″N 79°3′1″W
- Built: 1878
- Architectural style: Gothic Revival
- NRHP reference No.: 90000687
- Added to NRHP: May 10, 1990

St. John's Episcopal Church is a historic Episcopal church located at Youngstown in Niagara County, New York. It is a Gothic Revival style board and batten frame church constructed in 1878.

It was listed on the National Register of Historic Places in 1990.
