= John Carter Farmstead =

Historic house in New York, United States

- U.S. National Register of Historic Places
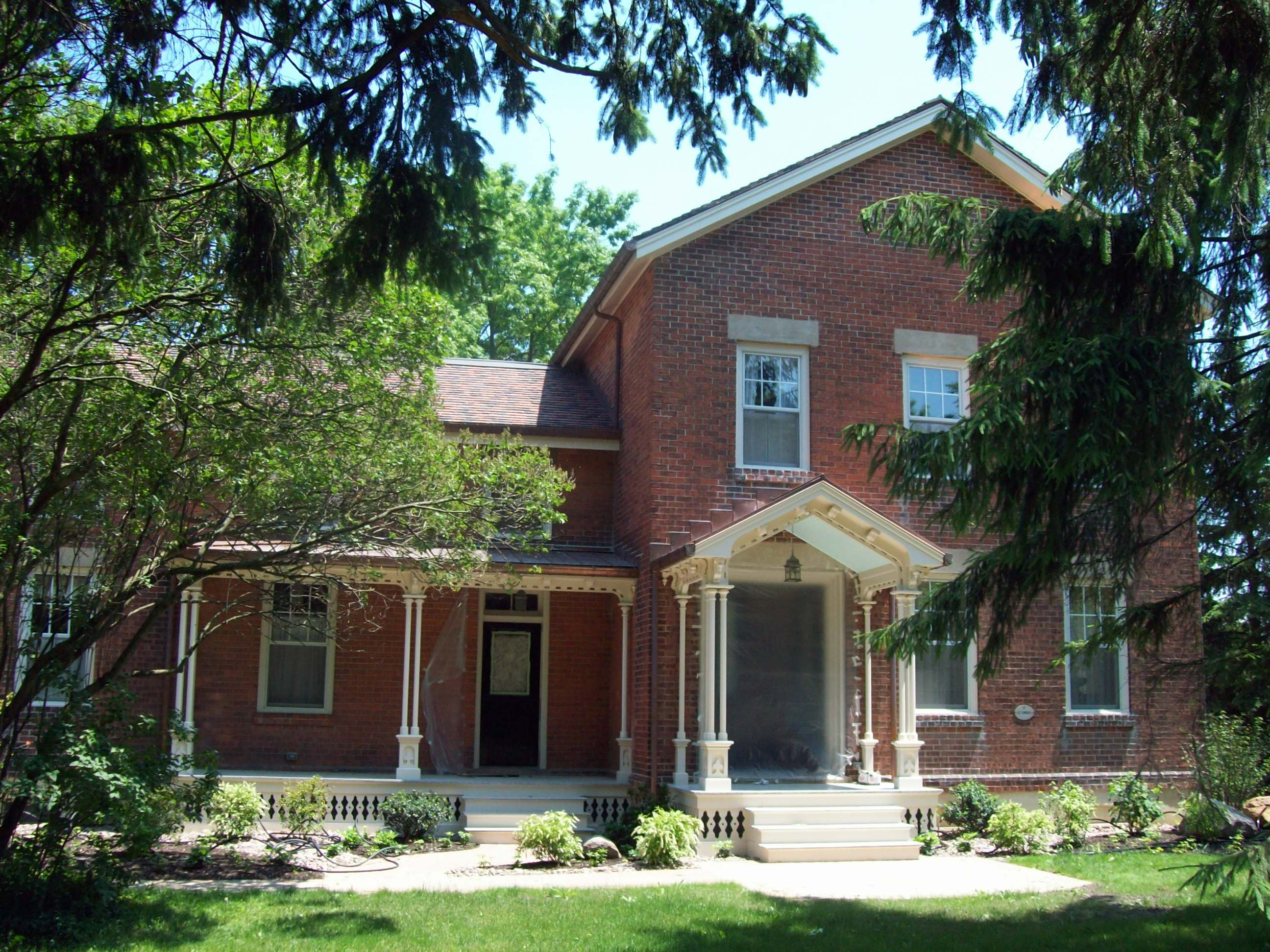
- John Carter Farmstead, June 2009

- Location within New York Location within the United States
- Nearest city: Youngstown, New York
- Coordinates: 43°15′51″N 79°2′46″W
- Built: 1857
- Architect: Carter, John
- Architectural style: Greek Revival, Italianate
- NRHP reference No.: 07000490
- Added to NRHP: May 30, 2007

John Carter Farmstead is a historic farmhouse and bank barn located at Youngstown in Niagara County, New York. It consists of a brick dwelling constructed in 1858 in the Italianate style and a brick bank barn, constructed in 1857. The farm ceased operation in 1996.

It was listed on the National Register of Historic Places in 2007.
