= Blairville, New York =

Hamlet in New York, United States

Coordinates: 43°14′02″N 79°01′01″W

Blairville is a hamlet in the town of Porter in Niagara County, New York, United States.
