= Lewiston Public Library (New York) =

Public library in Lewiston, New York

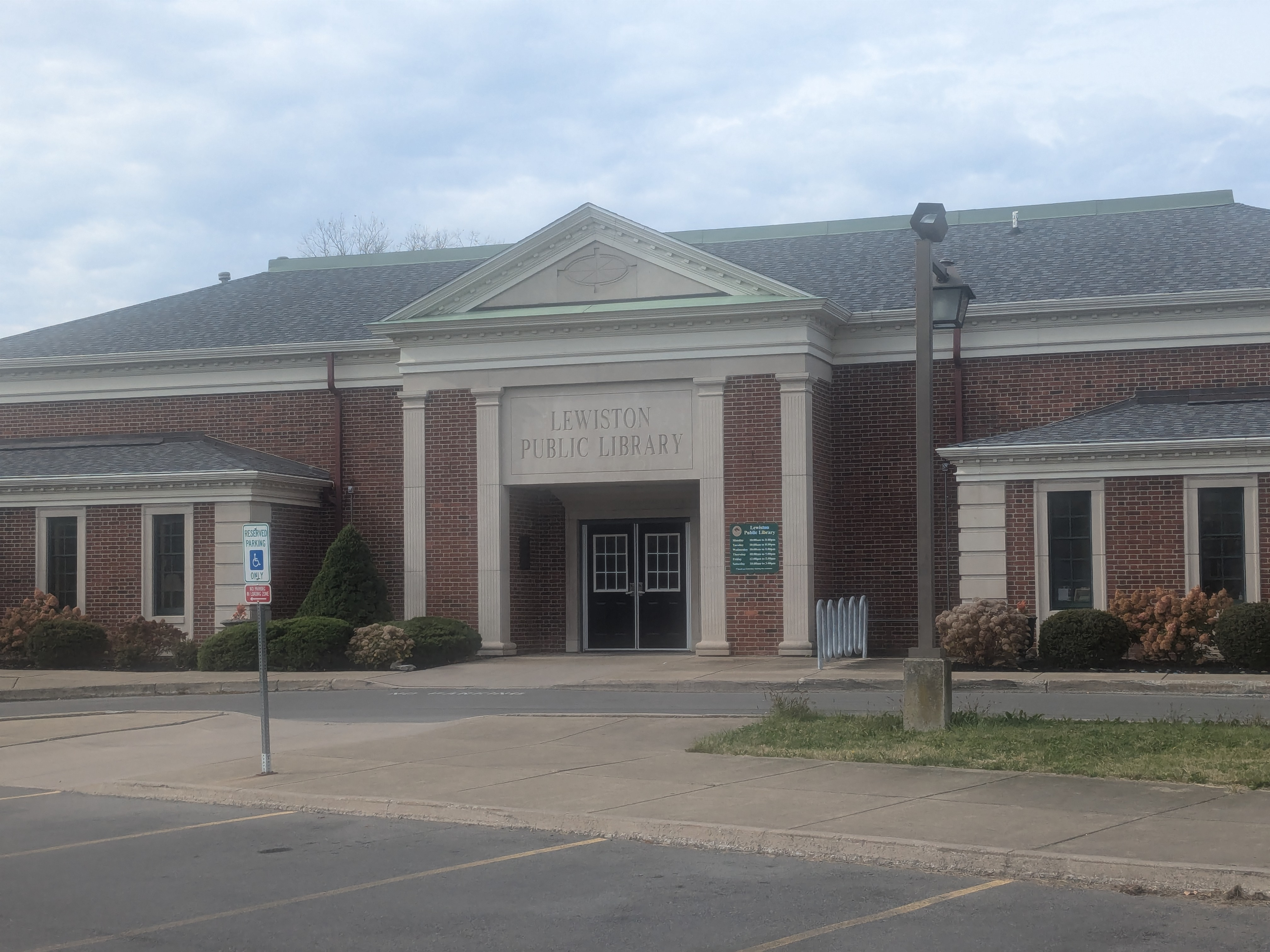
- The library in 2024
- 43.16918220326756°N 79.03639341019323°W
- Location: Lewiston, New York, United States

Other information
- Website: www.lewistonpubliclibrary.org

The Lewiston Public Library, is located in Lewiston, New York, United States. The library was permanently chartered by the State of New York in 2008. The library is chartered to serve the Town and Village of Lewiston and has a service population of over 14,000. It is part of the Nioga Library System.

== History ==
In July 1901, the newly organized Men's Club of Lewiston proposed "as soon as practicable to establish public reading rooms and to take steps towards forming the nucleus of a public library." According to its newsletter, the club "cordially invites all friends of education and progress to attend and bring with them each a book as a contribution to the cause." In 1938, the library was almost forced to close its doors for lack of financial support. However, the Lewiston Service Guild stepped in and took over the annual membership drive, collecting $150, which saved the library. The Guild also made building repairs, cleaned and painted the facility and purchased new books. The Guild continued to collect door-to-door for operating funds for many decades.

In 1961, the library moved into the Hotchkiss Building (also known as the "Long House") at 505 Center Street. The house was built by Judge William Hotchkiss in 1815 after his return home from the War of 1812. The library received its provisional charter in 1976 and subsequently began to earn support through tax dollars. In 1990, the library moved into its new building at 305 South Eighth Street in the Village of Lewiston. The late State Senator John B. Daly became the library's main supporter in the late 1980s and 1990s. The new children's wing, added in 1999, is named in his honor.

== Art ==
The Library Board hired sculptor E. B. Cox of Ontario to do renditions of the seven animals representing the seven Tuscarora clans to decorate the new library. The library contains the Bjarne Klaussen Collection, which depicts buildings of Lewiston, New York that were considered historically significant in the village's development.
