= Niagara River Greenway Plan =

The Niagara River Greenway Plan is a comprehensive plan focusing on the development of a greenway of interconnected parks, river access points and waterfront trails along the right bank of the Niagara River from Lake Ontario to Lake Erie. The plan was drawn up by The Niagara River Greenway Commission, first established in 2004 by then New York state Governor George Pataki.

== Location of The Greenway ==
The Greenway is defined by Municipal boundaries. Currently 13 Towns, Villages, Cities and Municipalities are located within the Greenway. Upon completion the Greenway will encompass approximately 35 miles (north to south) of greenspace.

=== Included Municipalities ===
- Porter, New York
- Youngstown, New York
- Village of Lewiston, New York
- Town of Lewiston, New York
- Niagara, New York
- Niagara Falls, New York
- Wheatfield, New York
- North Tonawanda, New York
- Town of Tonawanda, New York
- City of Tonawanda, New York
- Grand Island, New York
- Kenmore, New York
- Buffalo, New York
