= Towers Corners, New York =

Hamlet in New York, United States

Coordinates: 43°15′29″N 79°00′33″W

Towers Corners is a hamlet in the town of Porter in Niagara County, New York, United States.
