= Freedom Crossing Monument =

Monument in Lewiston, New York, USA

Coordinates: 43.1735°N 79.0491°W

Freedom Crossing Monument is located on the bank of the Niagara River in Lewiston, New York, and honors the courage of fugitive slaves who sought a new life of freedom in Canada, and to the local volunteers who protected and helped them on their journey across the Niagara River. It was dedicated on October 14, 2009.

It also highlights and celebrates the historical importance of the Niagara River as a gateway to freedom on the Underground Railroad during the mid-19th century.

It was the first project to receive the endorsement of the Niagara River Greenway Commission and the project conception, planning and fund raising was done entirely by volunteers of the Historical Association of Lewiston, Inc., the monument's sponsor. The Association advanced the concept of the monument in 2006.

Primary funding was provided by the Town of Lewiston with Niagara River Greenway Plan funds which were received from the New York Power Authority, and with supplemental private support from the Margaret L. Wendt Foundation and the KeyBank Foundation. No tax dollars were used. Total project cost was $230,000.

== Origins ==
The monument is named after the Freedom Crossing book, which was authored by Margaret Goff Clark (1913–2003) first published in 1969. It has been read by over half a million 4th and 5th graders across the United States and it is their first exposure the workings of the Underground Railroad. The story takes place in Lewiston and Mrs. Clark included detailed descriptions of many notable landmarks, including the Presbyterian Church and Tryon's Folly. She also prominently mentions Josiah Tryon (1798–1886), who was Lewiston's volunteer "station master" on the Underground Railroad. Mr. Tryon secretly guided the escapees on their journey and escorted them across the Niagara River in his rowboat under the cover of darkness. He is depicted in the Monument and is handing the baby to the fugitive mother.

The fictional heroine of the Freedom Crossing book, Laura Eastman, a teenage girl, is shown in the Monument (her outstretched arm pointing the way to Canada across the river) to memorialize the book and the ideals that symbolize the courage of both the freedom seekers and the volunteers who helped them escape.

== Design and construction ==
Susan Geissler, a sculptor, was commissioned by the Historical Association to design and produce the monument. The original concept was in collaboration with the volunteer project director, Lee Simonson. While the concept designs, approvals and fundraising took over three years, the actual construction, from start to finish, was about nine months.

The bronze monument pieces were cast in Loveland, Colorado, and were transported to Lewiston by truck. Once the pieces arrived, the installation was accomplished in a 12-hour period on Monday, September 28, 2009, during the worst weather day of that month. The Village of Lewiston Public Works crew, along with volunteer architect John Giusiana, landscaper Jeff Thompson and bronze installer, Ed Darchuk, completed the work.

== Physical characteristics ==
The monument consists of five bronze sculptures that are 120% lifesize. The subjects are a family of freedom seekers including a father, mother and baby; Lewiston's Underground Railroad Station Master, Josiah Tryon; and the fictional heroine, Laura Eastman, from the Freedom Crossing book. A rowboat is also part of the monument and two of the subjects are standing on rock depicting the bank of the Niagara River.

Every aspect of the monument has some significance, including the cane held by the fugitive father. Legend indicates that a cane made "of thornwood and entwined with tendrils" was given in thanks to one of the local volunteers by an escapee.

== The Harriet Controversy ==
The original monument design also included a likeness of Harriet Tubman, a well-known African-American abolitionist from Maryland who guided fugitive slaves to Canada. Tubman is known to have helped escapees cross the Niagara River to St. Catharines, Ontario. When the design was announced, a firestorm of controversy erupted with criticism from Niagara Falls, New York, Lewiston's neighboring community to the south.

Critics from Niagara Falls claimed that there was no proof that Tubman was ever in Lewiston. Kevin Cottrell, the leader of the "North Star" project to promote the Underground Railroad in Niagara Falls, said Lewiston's plans to include Tubman in the monument was "bad history" and that it could hurt the Falls' efforts to tell its own story. "I don't begrudge Lewiston, but it's the people in the Falls who better wake up and see that, if they don't tell their story, someone else will." Soon after, the Niagara Falls Tourism Advisory Board passed a resolution in support of locating a statue of Tubman in Niagara Falls. Niagara Falls City Administrator Bill Bradberry, a member of the board, called Lewiston's plans "disingenuous, dishonest, historically inaccurate and just wrong." On June 11, 2007, the Niagara Falls City Council passed a resolution stating, "the truth is the only thing that sells and that tourists crave authenticity, not fiction. The City Council supports locating a bronze statue of Tubman near the Whirlpool Rapids Bridge abutment near Ontario and Whirlpool Streets in Niagara Falls and not in Lewiston."

The issue received widespread newspaper and television coverage and the controversy became so fever pitched that Cottrell was quoted as saying, "We're glad they (the City Council and Tourism Advisory Board) are endorsing what we're doing. I just think they need to tone it down."

On June 14, 2007, representatives of the Historical Association of Lewiston and the City of Niagara Falls, met to discuss the proposed design. On June 18, 2007, the Historical Association dropped its plans to include Tubman in the Freedom Crossing Monument, saying it would focus the monument on Lewiston's Underground Station Master, Josiah Tryon.

== Freedom Crossing Monument trivia ==
Since no known photographic image exists of Josiah Tryon, local Tryon re-enactor Timothy Henderson was used as the model. Henderson has been portraying Tryon since 1994.

The monument contains hidden messages and codes on each character. For example, the GPS coordinates of Josiah Tryon's gravesite are inscribed on his bronze sculpture.

The monument is the first large scale Underground Railroad monument in Western New York on the Canada–US border, and the second in the United States, the first being in Detroit, Michigan.

Speakers at the dedication ceremony included Marcia Clark Noel, daughter of the Freedom Crossing book author, and Lezlie Harper Wells, a descendant of fugitive slaves who crossed the Niagara River.

== Descriptive plaque ==
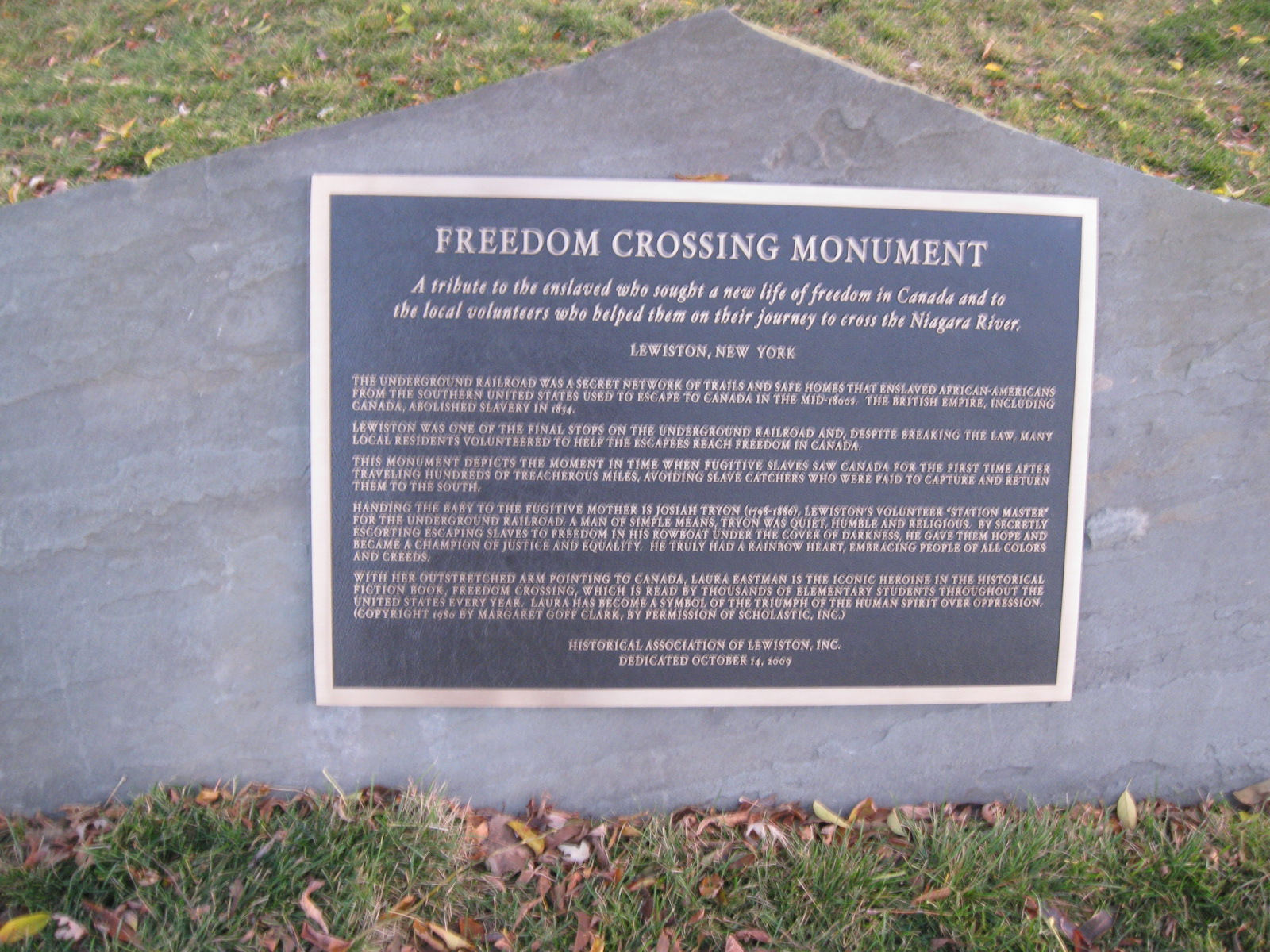
Plaque at Freedom Crossing Monument

The Underground Railroad was a secret network of trails and safe houses that enslaved African-Americans from the southern United States used to escape to Canada in the mid-19th century. The British Empire, including Canada, abolished slavery in 1834.

Lewiston was one of the final stops on the Underground Railroad and, despite breaking the law, many local residents volunteered to help the escapees reach freedom in Canada.

This Monument depicts the moment in time when fugitive slaves saw Canada for the first time after traveling hundreds of treacherous miles, avoiding slave catchers who were paid to capture and return them to the South.

Handing the baby to the fugitive mother is Josiah Tryon (1798–1886), Lewiston's volunteer "station master" for the Underground Railroad. A man of simple means, Tryon was quiet, humble and religious. By secretly escorting escaping slaves to freedom in his rowboat under the cover of darkness, he gave them hope and became a champion of justice and equality. He truly had a rainbow heart, embracing people of all colors and creeds.

With her outstretched arm pointing to Canada, Laura Eastman is the iconic heroine in the historical fiction book Freedom Crossing, which is read by thousands of elementary students throughout the United States every year. Laura has become the symbol of the triumph of the human spirit over oppression. (copyright 1980 by Margaret Goff Clark, by permission of Scholastic, Inc.)

== Sponsor plaque ==
A Niagara River Greenway Project
Sculpture by Susan Geissler
Town of Lewiston Council
Fred M. Newlin II, Supervisor
Ernest C. Palmer Michael A. Johnson
Alfonso M. Bax Sean A. Edwards
Village of Lewiston Board of Trustees
Richard F. Soluri, Mayor
Michael J. Marra Terry C. Collesano
William E. Geiben Ronald R. Winkley
With private funding from
The Margaret L. Wendt Foundation
and
The KeyBank Foundation
In cooperation with the
Niagara River Greenway Commission
and
New York State Power Authority
Sponsored by the
Historical Association of Lewiston, Inc.
Lee Simonson Diane Finkbeiner Pamela Hauth

Project Director President Executive Director

== Project timeline ==
- April 6, 2006: Concept first suggested in an email from Historical Association volunteer, Lee Simonson, to local sculptor Susan Geissler.
- May 17, 2007: NY State Parks Commissioner, Carol Ash, visits Lewiston and sees the Monument concept on a canvas mural, and comments, "It's wonderful."
- May 24, 2007: Meeting in Lewiston with Marie Hare of the KeyBank Foundation. KeyBank becomes first private sponsor.
- June 14, 2007: Meeting with Niagara Falls representatives at the Castellani Art Museum at Niagara University to discuss the inclusion of Harriet Tubman in the Monument. Subsequent decision is to remove her from the Monument.
- October 15, 2007: Project gets unanimous support from the Village of Lewiston.
- October 29, 2007: Meeting with the Margaret L. Wendt Foundation seeking support. Becomes the major private sponsor.
- January 15, 2008: First project to receive approval from the Niagara River Greenway Commission. Entire process, including the application and planning is done by volunteers from the Historical Association of Lewiston.
- April 28, 2008: Unanimous approval received from the Town of Lewiston to use Greenway funds. Councilman Ernest Palmer is the prime sponsor.
- June 25, 2008: Lewiston Supervisor Fred Newlin presents the project to the Host Communities Standing Committee of the Greenway and receives unanimous approval.
- July 27, 2008: Contract signed between Historical Association of Lewiston and artist Susan Geissler to begin work.
- July 24, 2009: Site work begins at Lewiston Landing Park along the Lower Niagara River with electrical work and the installation of two permanent webcams that will broadcast live streaming video over the Internet.
- September 28, 2009: Mounting of the bronze sculptures done in a 12-hour work session with Colorado installer, Ed Darchuk, with help from Village of Lewiston crew, Lewiston architect John Giusiana, and Newfane landscaper, Jeff Thompson. Detailed landscaping portion begins.
- October 14, 2009: Unveiling of the Freedom Crossing Monument during an evening ceremony under the lights, with over 400 in attendance.
