= Dickersonville, New York =

Hamlet in New York, United States

Coordinates: 43°11′26″N 78°55′49″W

Dickersonville is a hamlet in the town of Lewiston in Niagara County, New York, United States.

== History ==
The area of Dickersonville, previously known as Hardscrabble, was crossed by a trail used by indigenous people before being the site of a military encampment. The camp at Hardscrabble was established during the War of 1812 in the area near the intersection of modern-day Ridge Road and Dickersonville Road, though the exact location of the camp is debated. It is estimated to have been large enough to house up to two thousand men. Five hundred men were listed in the camp before it was burned by the British and their Native allies in 1814.

Following the British capture of Fort Niagara in December 19, 1812, British forces proceeded to Lewiston. With the attack on Lewiston, many settler civilians fled the village along the Ridge Road towards the Hardscrabble area. Tuscarora women retreating from their nearby village on the Ridge Road were the first to warn the settlers in Hardscrabble of the oncoming attack, allowing many to escape. The pursuit by British forces and their Native allies continued up to a mile beyond Hardscrabble.

=== Settlement ===
The region had been sought for settlement by European-Americans before the War of 1812. One early settler was Silas Hopkins of New Jersey who had been in the area in the 1780s when Fort Niagara was still under British administration. Hopkins was active in the fur trade in the Lewiston area in 1788; he settled on a farm on Ridge Road east of modern-day Dickersonville.

Coronel Alexander Dickerson was a settler in the wilderness along the River Road in modern-day North Tonawanda. He found little traffic there and was looking for a more lucrative site and found it at Hardscrabble. The area was a prime location because it had already been previously cleared by the army. He bought a home along with a 164-acre lot of land there in 1823 along with a farm previously settled by Jesse Beach, an early Lewiston settler, in 1803; there, he operated a tavern. Ridge Road was the only road into Lewiston at that time and Dickerson became a prominent landowner of the region. By 1837, he bought the remaining available property in the area of Dickersonville from William Porter. A settlement was beginning to form with the addition of a mill, school, store and blacksmith shop. Alexander Dickerson was a foundational member of the community and it became known as the Hamlet of Dickersonville. Before being named Dickersonville, Hardscrabble had been known by several other names including, Skunks Misery, Hog Holler, Cattle Town, and Onionville. The Dickerson estate home stayed in his family until 1867, changing ownership several times since then; as of 2022, it continued to be an active harm known as Raby Farm.

The first postmaster of the hamlet was William Pool, appointed in 1850; Pool was followed by Alexander Read, then reverend Sheldon Clark Townsend under whom the office was discontinued. The Methodist church of Dickersonville was organized at some time during 1850 to 1855; the church building was built on land donated by reverend Townsend, who was the first preacher. According to William Pool, a Lewistown journalist and historian, the hamlet had lost much of its original business importance by the late 1890s.

=== Cemetery ===
The Dickersonville Cemetery was established in 1854 on land donated by Isaac Woolson II, containing thirty plots. The cemetery was expanded to contain more than a thousand plots in 1872. The town of Lewiston assumed ownership of the cemetery in 1983.

== Bibliography ==
- Pool, William (1897). Landmarks of Niagara County. New York: D. Mason and Company.
