= Porter Center, New York =

Hamlet in New York, United States

Coordinates: 43°14′58″N 78°57′27″W

Porter Center is a hamlet in the town of Porter in Niagara County, New York, United States.
