= Clarkson House (Lewiston, New York) =

1818 building in Lewiston, New York

- Interactive map of the Clarkson House area

General information
- Location: 810 Center Street; Lewiston, New York 14092
- Coordinates: 43.172656°N 79.035079°W
- Current tenants: The Griffon House
- Completed: 1818
- Renovated: 2004
- Owner: GMA Properties, LLC

The Clarkson House is an 1818 building in Lewiston, New York that has been in use as a restaurant since 1958.

== History ==
The Clarkson House building was "one of the first buildings constructed after the burning of the Village of Lewiston by the British during the War of 1812. It was built in 1818 by Jacob Townsend who came to Lewiston from Connecticut in 1810".

== Restaurant ==
Robert and Marilyn Clarkson established the Clarkson House restaurant in the building in 1958, operating it as their family business until 1995. The intimate steak and lobster restaurant was "a favorite stop for travelers and visitors to Lewiston" from both sides of the border, and has been repeatedly featured in "Country Inns and Back Roads" travel guides.

Following the Clarksons' retirement, the restaurant continued operating under the Clarkson House name until August 2009, new tenant Gary Macri reopened the restaurant under the name Macri's Italian Grille, his family business of over 60 years.

In 2017, the building was leased by the Griffon Gastropub, and they reopened the restaurant as the Griffon House.
