= Margaret Goff Clark =

American children's book author

- Born: March 7, 1913; Oklahoma City, Oklahoma
- Died: October 6, 2003 (aged 90); Santa Monica, California
- Writing career
- Genre: Children's literature

Margaret Goff Clark (1913–2003) was an American author of children's books. She is best known for her book Freedom Crossing.

Clark née Goff was born on March 7, 1913, in Oklahoma City, Oklahoma. She attended the State Teachers College at Buffalo. In 1937 she married Charles R. Clark.

Her first book was The Mystery of Seneca Hill published in 1961 by Franklin Watts. Her book Freedom Crossing was published in 1969 by Funk & Wagnalls. It was a historical novel for children about the Underground Railroad. In 1995 her book The Threatened Florida Black Bear was published by Cobblehill Books. That book was a recipient of a 1995 Outstanding Science Trade Books for Students K–12 awarded by the National Science Teachers Association.

Clark died on October 6, 2003, in Santa Monica, California.

== See also ==
- Freedom Crossing Monument
