= Joseph Davis State Park =

State park in Niagara County, New York

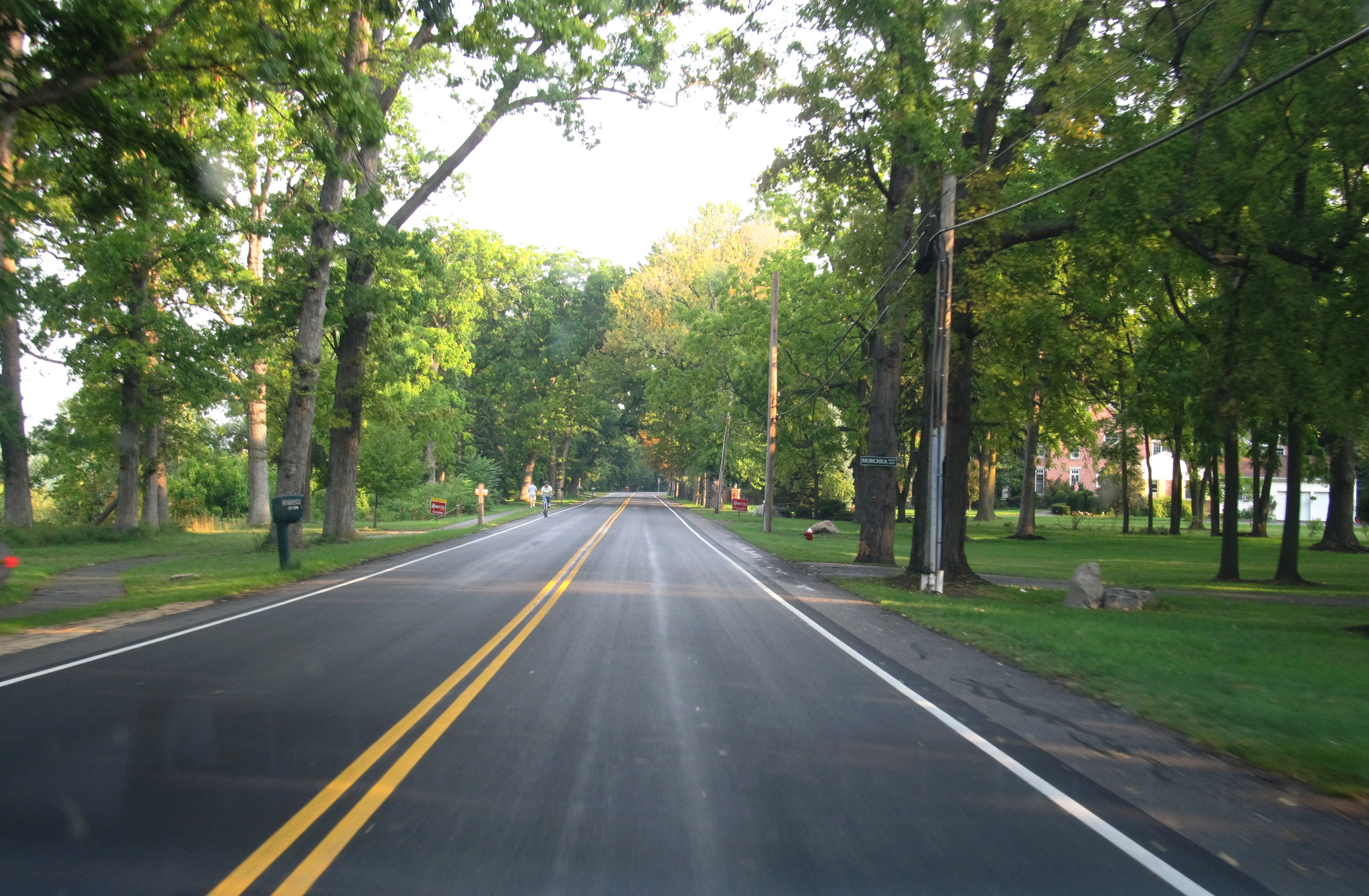
- Joseph Davis State Park, September 2012

- Location within New York
- Type: State park
- Location: 4143 Lower River Road; Lewiston, New York
- Nearest city: Lewiston, New York
- Coordinates: 43°12′47″N 79°02′31″W
- Area: 388 acres (1.57 km^{2})
- Created: 1964; 62 years ago
- Operator: Town of Lewiston; New York State Office of Parks, Recreation and Historic Preservation
- Visitors: 27,644 (in 2010)
- Open: All year
- Website: Joseph Davis State Park

Joseph Davis State Park is a 388-acre (1.57 km^{2}) state park located along the banks of the lower Niagara River in the Town of Lewiston in Niagara County, New York.

== History ==
Joseph Davis State Park was originally known as Lower Niagara State Park when it first opened in 1964. The park was formed from a 220-acre (0.89 km^{2}) parcel of land purchased by New York State in 1961. An additional 98 acres (0.40 km^{2}) of land was added to the park in 1969, just before the decision to rename the park in honor of Joseph Davis in 1970. Davis was a former president of the Niagara Frontier State Parks Commission, serving from 1948 to 1969.

In 2005, the park was featured in the eighth installment of the reality competition series The Amazing Race as the Finish Line for the Race.

Since 2011, the park has been operated by the Town of Lewiston in partnership with the New York State Office of Parks, Recreation and Historic Preservation.

== Park description ==
Joseph Davis State Park includes trails for hiking, snowshoeing, cross-country skiing, and snowmobiling, in addition to facilitating access for anglers to fish in the Niagara River or several ponds within the park. The park also includes a free 27-hole disc golf course.

A bird conservation area has also been established within the park, including riverfront land, wetlands, and successional shrubland. The conservation area's primary purpose is to provide habitat and feeding areas for songbirds that utilize river corridors during their annual migrations.

== See also ==
- List of New York state parks
