= Four Mile Creek State Park =

State park in Niagara County, New York

- Location within New York
- Type: State park
- Location: 1055 Lake Road; Youngstown, New York
- Coordinates: 43°16′30″N 78°59′53″W
- Area: 248 acres (1.00 km^{2})
- Operator: New York State Office of Parks, Recreation and Historic Preservation
- Visitors: 79,609 (in 2014)
- Open: All year
- Website: Four Mile Creek State Park

Four Mile Creek State Park is a 248-acre (1.00 km^{2}) state park located in the Town of Porter in Niagara County, New York. The park is at the mouth of Four Mile Creek on the shore of Lake Ontario, approximately 15 miles (24 km) north of the Niagara Falls.

== Description ==
The park offers picnic tables, a playground, hiking and biking, a campground with tent and trailer sites, yurts, laundry facilities, recreation programs, a nature trail, and a food concession. Camping permits issued by the park allow for free parking at other state parks located in the area. Wildlife at the park includes great blue herons and white-tailed deer.

== See also ==
- List of New York state parks
