= Youngstown, New York =

Youngstown
- Village
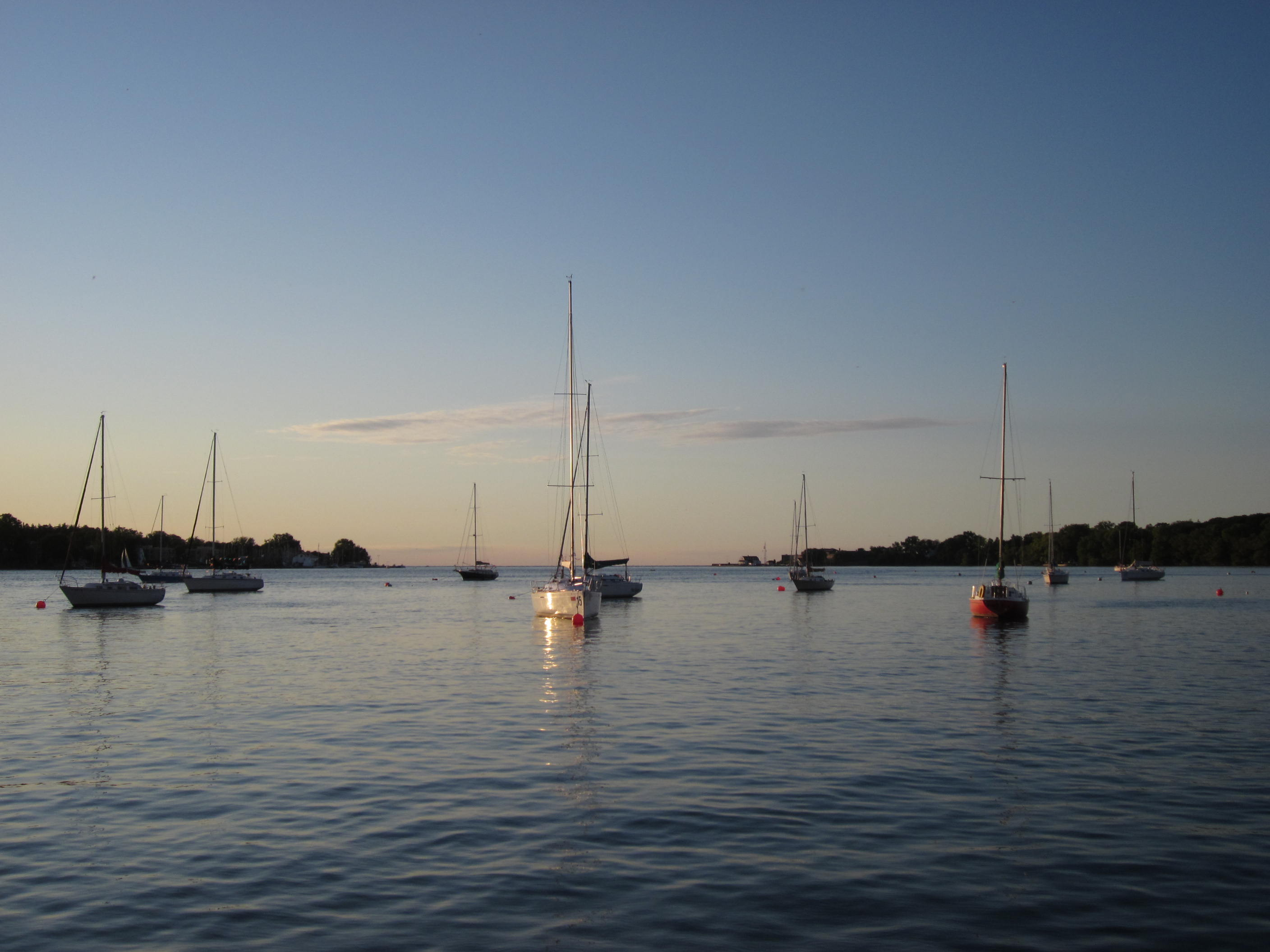
- Niagara River in Youngstown

- Coat of arms
- Nickname: Y-Town
- Location in Niagara County and the state of New York.

- Location within New York
- Coordinates: 43°14′56″N 79°2′33″W
- Country: United States
- State: New York
- County: Niagara
- Named for: John Young

Area
  - Total: 1.34 sq mi (3.46 km^{2})
  - Land: 1.08 sq mi (2.80 km^{2})
  - Water: 0.25 sq mi (0.66 km^{2})
- Elevation: 300 ft (90 m)

Population (2020)
  - Total: 1,859
  - Density: 1,720.0/sq mi (664.08/km^{2})
- Time zone: UTC-5 (Eastern (EST))
  - Summer (DST): UTC-4 (EDT)
- ZIP code: 14174
- Area code: 716
- FIPS code: 36-84143
- GNIS feature ID: 0971860
- Website: Village of Youngstown

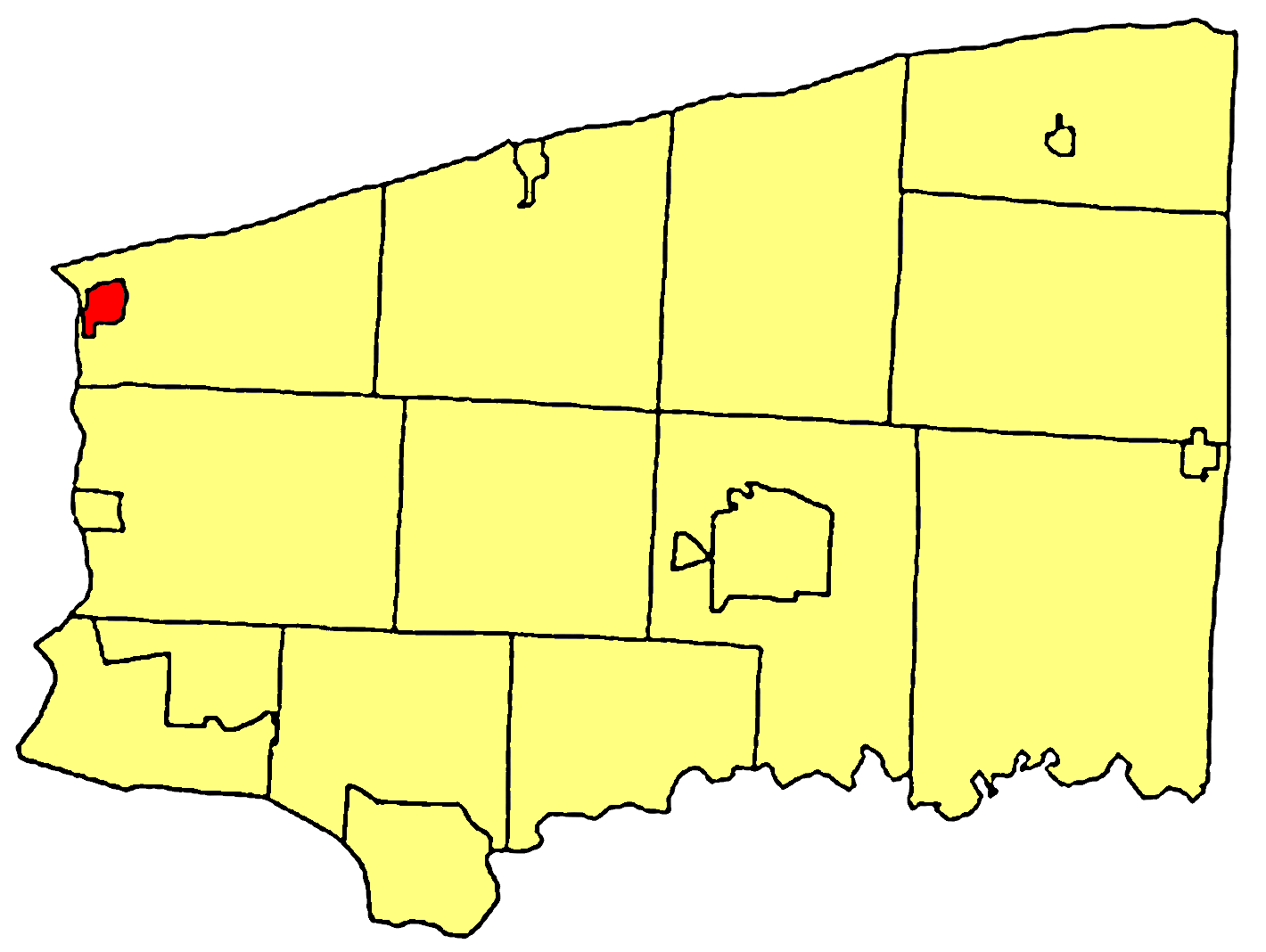
Location within Niagara County.

Youngstown is a village in Niagara County, New York, United States. As of the 2020 census, Youngstown had a population of 1,859. It is part of the Buffalo-Niagara Falls metropolitan area.

Youngstown is on the western edge of the town of Porter and is at the international border with Canada, at Niagara-on-the-Lake, Ontario. It is north of the city of Niagara Falls.

== History ==
The village's early growth was under the protection of Fort Niagara. The village was destroyed by the British in 1813 during the War of 1812. The Village of Youngstown was incorporated in 1854, named after John Young.

Youngstown is an historic village located at the northwestern corner of the state where the Niagara River flows into Lake Ontario. In an area known to the Indians for hundreds of years, the French explorer La Salle left his mark by building a small fort in 1670, less than a mile north of where the village now stands. The French gained control of the Great Lakes area and by 1727 built the "Castle" which became the centerpiece of Old Fort Niagara.

John Young, who lived across the river, saw opportunities on this side and built a store on the landing area in 1809. In 1811, he bought Lots 1 and 2 of the Mile Reserve. These included all the property from what is now the north side of Falkner Park and as far south as Campbell Street and from the river eastward to what is now the Niagara Scenic Parkway.

Young sold the Falkner Park area to Robert Greensit in March 1812 before the war started between the U.S. and England. By that time, a number of log cabins had been built to provide shelter for the skilled tradesmen and storekeepers who were attracted to the area by the Fort which needed many supplies and services.

In 1813, American forces captured Fort George across the river. At Christmas time, they retreated to the American side after burning the Village of Newark, Ontario (now Niagara-On-The-Lake). In retaliation, British and Indians captured Fort Niagara and burned most of the buildings and homes south of it to what is now Buffalo.

Rebuilding gradually took place and by the 1840s the village was well established with many fine homes and stores. The moderate climate, the excellent fishing, accessibility by lake boats and proximity to Canada all played a part in Youngstown's growth. The soil proved invaluable for fruit culture which attracted many farmers. This led to the development of industries such as barrel making, fruit packing and storage, the drying of apples and making of cider and vinegar. Carpenters, blacksmiths and other tradesmen were needed as lumber and shipbuilding businesses were important for many years.

Many changes have come about through the years: concrete sidewalks replaced those made of wood. The dirt and stone road to Lewiston became a safe paved highway; the fire company grew from a man-pulled hose cart into a fully equipped fire department and water and sewer systems were installed throughout the village. The handling of mail began in Judge Hinman's home and was finally delivered house to house in 1959.

Three railroads were built to the village. Two failed immediately in the 1850s, but the electric line carried supplies to the village and fort as well as bringing thousands of people to the old beach amusement park.

The following are listed on the National Register of Historic Places: Fort Niagara Light, John Carter Farmstead, St. John's Episcopal Church, and the Old Fort Niagara-Colonial Niagara Historic District.

== Youngstown landmarks ==
=== Old Fort Niagara ===
Old Fort Niagara is a National Historic Landmark and New York State Historic Site that welcomes more than 100,000 visitors every year. It offers a collection of original military architecture and fortifications from the 18th century and the 19th century, as well as living history events and programs, historical exhibits and collections, archaeology, and education.

The history of Old Fort Niagara spans more than 300 years. During the colonial wars in North America a fort at the mouth of the Niagara River was vital, for it controlled access to the Great Lakes and the westward route to the heartland of the continent. With the completion of the Erie Canal in 1825, however, the strategic value of Fort Niagara diminished. It nonetheless remained an active military post well into the 20th century.

The three flags flown daily above the parade ground symbolize the nations which have held Fort Niagara. Each competed for the support of a fourth nation; the powerful Iroquois Confederacy. The French established the first post here, Fort Conti, in 1679. Its successor, Fort Denonville (1687–88) was equally short lived. In 1726 France finally erected a permanent fortification with the construction of the impressive "French Castle." Britain gained control of Fort Niagara in 1759, during the French & Indian War, after a nineteen-day siege. The British held the post throughout the American Revolution but were forced, by treaty, to yield it to the United States in 1796. Fort Niagara was recaptured by the British in 1813. It was ceded to the United States a second time in 1815 at the end of the War of 1812.

== Notable people ==
- Micheal Barrett, Sergeant Major of the Marine Corps 2011–2015
- Dave Clawson, former head coach of the Wake Forest Demon Deacons college football team.
- Sid Jamieson, longtime Bucknell University lacrosse coach
- Daryl Johnston, former Dallas Cowboys NFL player, (Ret.).
- Gary Schiff, City Councilman in Minneapolis, Minnesota
- Henry Delp Styer, US Army brigadier general
- Kevin Sylvester, Author, Broadcaster

== Geography ==
According to the United States Census Bureau, the village has a total area of 1.4 square miles (3.6 km^{2}), of which 1.2 square miles (3.1 km^{2}) is land and 0.2 square miles (0.52 km^{2}) (17.14%) is water.

New York State Route 18F (Lower River Road) parallels the Niagara River through the village and intersects Lockport Street (NY 93).

New York State Route 93 (Lockport St. in the village, western terminus at NY 18F in the village).

=== Adjacent areas ===
The village is on the east bank of the Niagara River and is north of the city of Niagara Falls and the town of Lewiston. Youngstown is west of the Niagara Scenic Parkway and at the western end of the Youngstown-Lockport Road (NY-93). The village is entirely within the town of Porter. Across the Niagara River is the town of Niagara-on-the-Lake, Ontario, located within the Niagara Region.

Toronto is directly across Lake Ontario to the north. Day or night, under clear conditions, the Toronto skyline is visible to the naked eye from Old Fort Niagara State Park.

=== Climate ===
Northwestern Niagara County has a hot summer humid continental climate (Dfa), bordering closely on a humid subtropical climate (Cfa -3), with the temperature in January and February averaging about 27 °F (−3 °C).

Climate data for Youngstown, New York (1991–2020 normals, extremes 2000–present)
| Month | Jan | Feb | Mar | Apr | May | Jun | Jul | Aug | Sep | Oct | Nov | Dec | Year |
|---|---|---|---|---|---|---|---|---|---|---|---|---|---|
| Record high °F (°C) | 68 (20) | 74 (23) | 79 (26) | 85 (29) | 94 (34) | 95 (35) | 99 (37) | 97 (36) | 96 (36) | 89 (32) | 76 (24) | 71 (22) | 99 (37) |
| Mean daily maximum °F (°C) | 33.6 (0.9) | 35.5 (1.9) | 43.0 (6.1) | 55.1 (12.8) | 67.6 (19.8) | 77.4 (25.2) | 82.9 (28.3) | 81.2 (27.3) | 74.1 (23.4) | 61.5 (16.4) | 49.5 (9.7) | 38.5 (3.6) | 58.3 (14.6) |
| Daily mean °F (°C) | 26.4 (−3.1) | 27.4 (−2.6) | 34.1 (1.2) | 44.9 (7.2) | 56.8 (13.8) | 67.2 (19.6) | 72.7 (22.6) | 71.0 (21.7) | 63.9 (17.7) | 52.7 (11.5) | 41.6 (5.3) | 32.3 (0.2) | 49.2 (9.6) |
| Mean daily minimum °F (°C) | 19.2 (−7.1) | 19.2 (−7.1) | 25.3 (−3.7) | 34.7 (1.5) | 46.1 (7.8) | 57.1 (13.9) | 62.5 (16.9) | 60.8 (16.0) | 53.7 (12.1) | 43.9 (6.6) | 33.7 (0.9) | 26.0 (−3.3) | 40.2 (4.6) |
| Record low °F (°C) | −10 (−23) | −9 (−23) | −4 (−20) | 20 (−7) | 28 (−2) | 40 (4) | 46 (8) | 44 (7) | 30 (−1) | 23 (−5) | 9 (−13) | 0 (−18) | −10 (−23) |
| Average precipitation inches (mm) | 2.35 (60) | 2.22 (56) | 2.72 (69) | 4.06 (103) | 2.89 (73) | 3.23 (82) | 3.16 (80) | 2.19 (56) | 3.21 (82) | 2.93 (74) | 2.72 (69) | 2.72 (69) | 34.40 (874) |
| Average snowfall inches (cm) | 12.8 (33) | 20.8 (53) | 8.1 (21) | 1.7 (4.3) | 0.0 (0.0) | 0.0 (0.0) | 0.0 (0.0) | 0.0 (0.0) | 0.0 (0.0) | 0.0 (0.0) | 2.0 (5.1) | 9.8 (25) | 55.2 (140) |
| Average precipitation days (≥ 0.01 in) | 18.7 | 15.3 | 11.6 | 14.9 | 14.1 | 12.4 | 10.8 | 11.4 | 11.9 | 18.3 | 14.5 | 16.1 | 170.0 |
| Average snowy days (≥ 0.1 in) | 11.7 | 11.5 | 4.9 | 1.6 | 0.0 | 0.0 | 0.0 | 0.0 | 0.0 | 0.0 | 2.2 | 8.0 | 39.9 |
Source: NOAA

== Demographics ==
Historical population
| Census | Pop. | Note | %± |
|---|---|---|---|
| 1880 | 500 | | — |
| 1890 | 490 | | −2.0% |
| 1900 | 547 | | 11.6% |
| 1910 | 556 | | 1.6% |
| 1920 | 539 | | −3.1% |
| 1930 | 639 | | 18.6% |
| 1940 | 799 | | 25.0% |
| 1950 | 932 | | 16.6% |
| 1960 | 1,848 | | 98.3% |
| 1970 | 2,169 | | 17.4% |
| 1980 | 2,191 | | 1.0% |
| 1990 | 2,075 | | −5.3% |
| 2000 | 1,957 | | −5.7% |
| 2010 | 1,935 | | −1.1% |
| 2020 | 1,859 | | −3.9% |
U.S. Decennial Census

As of the census of 2000, there were 1,957 people, 809 households, and 564 families residing in the village. The population density was 1,687.5 inhabitants per square mile (651.5/km^{2}). There were 863 housing units at an average density of 744.2 per square mile (287.3/km^{2}). The racial makeup of the village was 98.42% White, 1.07% Native American, 0.05% from other races, and 0.46% from two or more races. Hispanic or Latino of any race were 0.77% of the population.

There were 809 households, out of which 30.9% had children under the age of 18 living with them, 56.9% were married couples living together, 9.3% had a female householder with no husband present, and 30.2% were non-families. 25.7% of all households were made up of individuals, and 12.0% had someone living alone who was 65 years of age or older. The average household size was 2.42 and the average family size was 2.93.

In the village, the population was spread out, with 24.3% under the age of 18, 6.5% from 18 to 24, 25.8% from 25 to 44, 27.3% from 45 to 64, and 16.0% who were 65 years of age or older. The median age was 41 years. For every 100 females, there were 91.3 males. For every 100 females age 18 and over, there were 87.0 males.

The median income for a household in the village was $48,333, and the median income for a family was $60,089. Males had a median income of $47,063 versus $23,333 for females. The per capita income for the village was $23,705. About 3.0% of families and 3.9% of the population were below the poverty line, including 4.0% of those under age 18 and 4.7% of those age 65 or over.
