= Lewiston, New York =

Lewiston, New York Uyhę́ha·ekwt (Tuscarora)
- Town
- Location in Niagara County and the state of New York.
- Coordinates: 43°10′40″N 78°58′25″W
- Country: United States
- State: New York
- County: Niagara
- Named for: Governor Morgan Lewis

Government
  - Type: Town Council
  - Town Supervisor: Steve Broderick
  - Town Council: Members' List: • John O. Jacoby; • Robin “Rob” Morreale; • Jason C. Meyers; • Sarah Waechter

Area
  - Total: 41.13 sq mi (106.53 km^{2})
  - Land: 37.12 sq mi (96.14 km^{2})
  - Water: 4.01 sq mi (10.39 km^{2})

Population (2020)
  - Total: 15,944
  - Density: 431.4/sq mi (166.57/km^{2})
- Time zone: Eastern (EST)
- ZIP Codes: 14092 (Lewiston); 14131 (Ransomville); 14132 (Sanborn); 14174 (Youngstown); 14304, 14305 (Niagara Falls); 14109 (Niagara University)
- FIPS code: 36-063-42158
- Website: www.townoflewistonny.gov

Lewiston (Tuscarora: Uyhę́ha·ekwt) is a town in Niagara County, New York, United States. The population was 15,944 at the 2020 census. The town and its contained village are named after Morgan Lewis, a governor of New York.

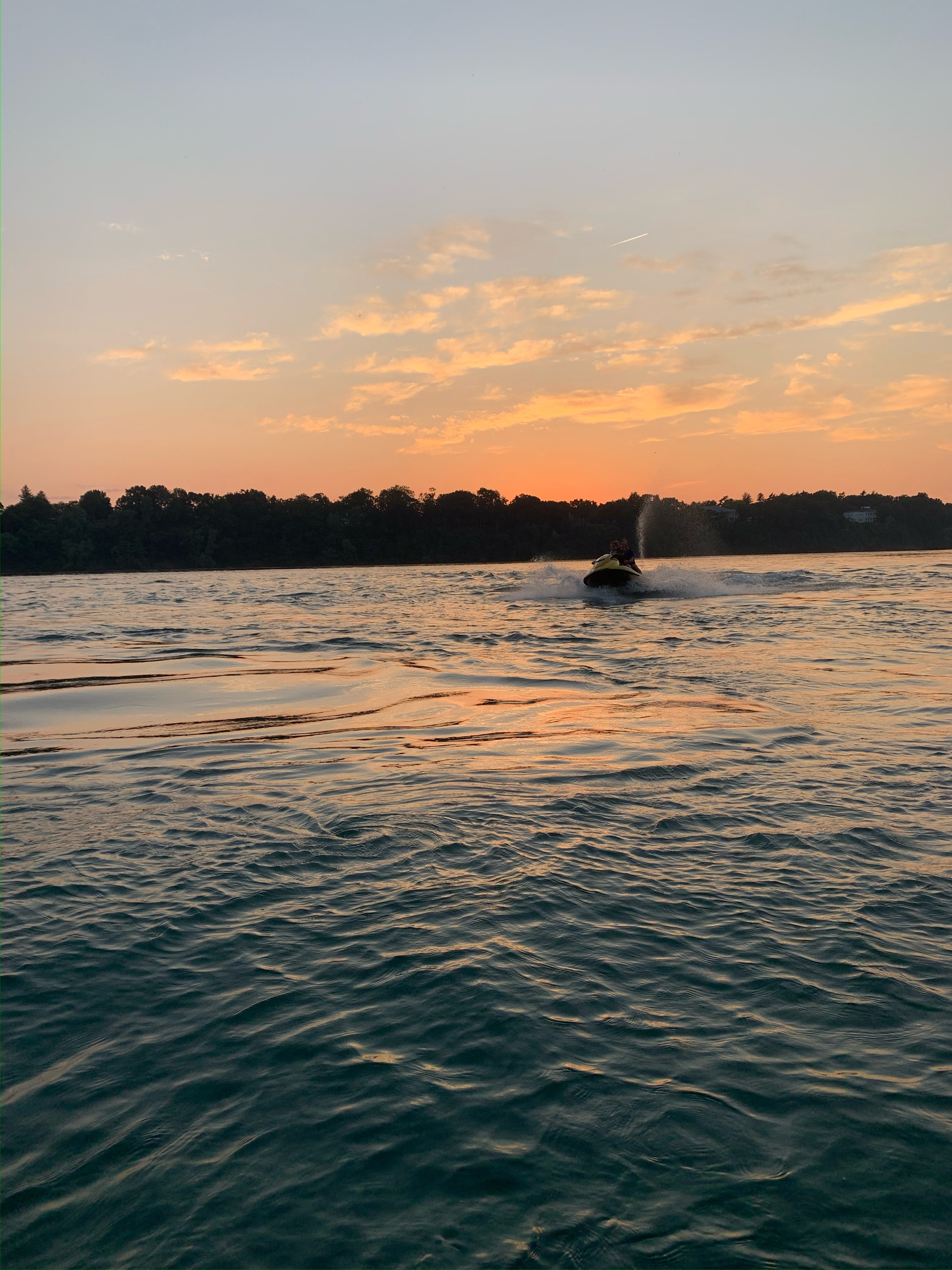
Niagara River, Lewiston NY

The Town of Lewiston is on the western border of the county. The Village of Lewiston and Tuscarora Reservation are located within the town.

== History ==
Lewiston is located at the site of the lower landing of the Niagara Portage, a historic route bypassing Niagara Falls.

The Town of Lewiston was formed in 1818 from the town of Cambria. Lewiston was the first European settlement in Western New York. A French explorer by the name of Étienne Brûlé arrived in 1615.

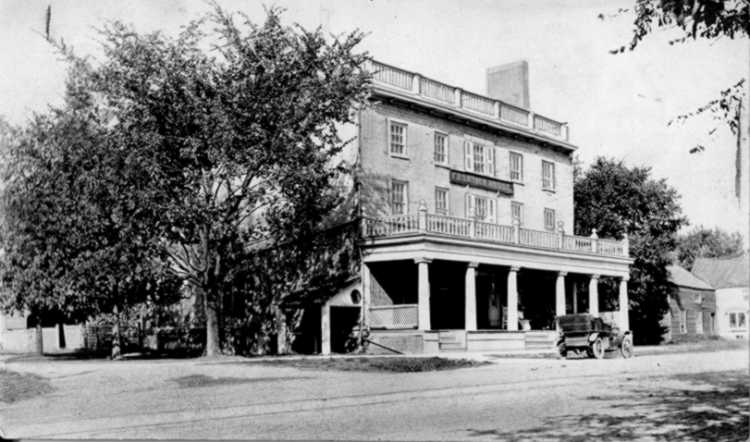
Frontier House

== Government ==
The Town Supervisor is Steve Broderick and the Chief of Police is Michael Salada.

The Town Supervisor is considered the "Chief Fiscal Officer" for the Town. In this capacity, the officeholder oversees all finances as well as presiding at Town Board meetings, representing the Town for the Niagara County Water District, Niagara County Sewer District, Niagara Greenway Commission and Niagara Power Coalition. The Supervisor also serves as an ex-officio board member on various community organizations.

Five volunteer fire companies protect the Town of Lewiston. The Lewiston #1 (established 1914) and #2 (established 1942) fire companies, the Pekin Volunteer Fire Company (established 1932), the Sanborn Volunteer Fire Company, and the Upper Mountain Fire Company (established 1959).

Several federal, state, county and local law enforcement agencies protect the town. The United States Border Patrol is the federal agency. The New York State agencies are the New York State Police and the New York State Parks Police. The Niagara County Sheriff's Department assists the Lewiston Police Department which is the local authority.

== Geography ==
According to the United States Census Bureau, the town has a total area of 41.0 square miles (106.3 km^{2}), of which 37.3 square miles (96.5 km^{2}) is land and 3.8 square miles (9.7 km^{2}) (9.16%) is water.

The Niagara River forms the western boundary of the town, which is an international border with Canada. The Town of Lewiston's southern border is with the City of Niagara Falls, NY, the Town of Niagara, NY, and the Town of Wheatfield, NY. The southern portion of the town also is on the top of the Niagara Escarpment. The eastern border of the town is at Townline Road which separates the Towns of Cambria and Lewiston. The northern border of the town is with the Towns of Porter and Wilson.

New York State Route 104 passes across the town as Lewiston Road on top of the Niagara Escarpment and Ridge Road below the Escarpment. There are three exits of Interstate 190 in Lewiston: exit 24 at Witmer Road (New York State Route 31), exit 25A at Military Road (New York State Route 265) and exit 25B for Route 104 and the Niagara Scenic Parkway.

=== Communities and locations within Lewiston ===
- Bonds Lake County Park – a park in the northeastern corner of the town.
- Colonial Village – a hamlet by the south town line on Route 31 (Saunders Settlement Road).
- Devil's Hole State Park – in the southwestern corner of the town.
- Dickersonville – a hamlet in the northeastern part of the town on Route 104 (Ridge Road).
- Earl W. Brydges Artpark State Park – a New York State Park on the eastern edge of the town.
- Falcon Manor – a location on the south town line, east of Colonial Village.
- Joseph Davis State Park– a New York State Park
- Lewiston Heights – an upscale neighborhood built atop the Niagara Escarpment.
- Lewiston Reservoir – a human-made 1,900-acre (770 ha), 22-billion-US-gallon (83,000,000 m^{3}) reservoir which stores water before being released into the forebay of the Robert Moses Power Station (also known as the Robert Moses Power Plant Reservoir).
- Model City – a hamlet on Route 104 (Lewiston Road).
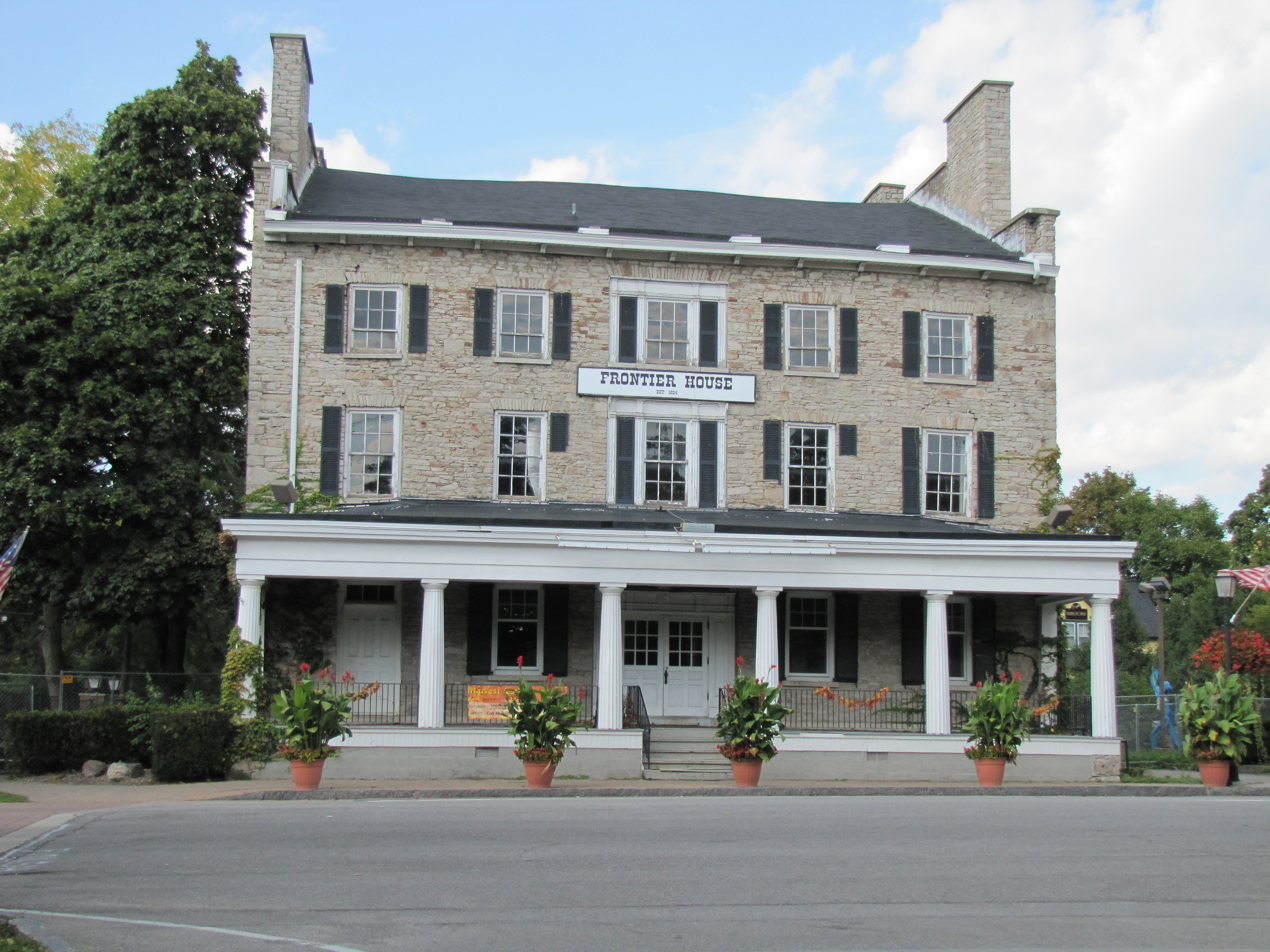
  Frontier House
- Niagara University, New York – a census-designated place.
- Pekin – a hamlet on the eastern town line.
- Reservoir State Park – a park on the south shore of the reservoir and Route 265 (Military Road).
- Sanborn – a hamlet originally called South Pekin that was later renamed Sanborn, after Ebenezer Sanborn, in 1866. It is in the southeast corner of the town on Route 429 (Cambria-Lewiston Town Line Road) and Route 31 (Saunders Settlement Road).
- Tuscarora Reservation – a 9.3 mi^{2} (24.0 km^{2}) reservation for the Tuscarora tribe (members of the Iroquois confederacy), east of the Reservoir, that lies entirely within the Town of Lewiston.
- Village of Lewiston – a historic village in the western part of the town.

=== Adjacent cities and towns ===
- Town of Porter - north
- Town of Cambria - east
- Town of Wheatfield - southeast
- Town of Niagara - south
- City of Niagara Falls - southwest
- Niagara-on-the-Lake, Ontario, Canada - northwest
- Niagara Falls, Ontario, Canada - west

== Demographics ==
Historical population
| Census | Pop. | Note | %± |
|---|---|---|---|
| 1820 | 869 | | — |
| 1830 | 1,528 | | 75.8% |
| 1840 | 2,533 | | 65.8% |
| 1850 | 2,924 | | 15.4% |
| 1860 | 3,379 | | 15.6% |
| 1870 | 2,959 | | −12.4% |
| 1880 | 2,768 | | −6.5% |
| 1890 | 2,577 | | −6.9% |
| 1900 | 2,884 | | 11.9% |
| 1910 | 2,846 | | −1.3% |
| 1920 | 2,750 | | −3.4% |
| 1930 | 3,420 | | 24.4% |
| 1940 | 4,448 | | 30.1% |
| 1950 | 6,921 | | 55.6% |
| 1960 | 13,686 | | 97.7% |
| 1970 | 15,888 | | 16.1% |
| 1980 | 16,219 | | 2.1% |
| 1990 | 15,453 | | −4.7% |
| 2000 | 16,257 | | 5.2% |
| 2010 | 16,262 | | 0.0% |
| 2020 | 15,944 | | −2.0% |
U.S. Decennial Census

As of the census of 2000, there were 16,257 people, 5,882 households, and 4,252 families residing in the town. The population density was 436.2 inhabitants per square mile (168.4/km^{2}). There were 6,147 housing units at an average density of 164.9 per square mile (63.7/km^{2}). The racial makeup of the town was 96.98% White, 0.92% Black or African American, 0.67% Native American, 0.58% Asian, 0.01% Pacific Islander, 0.34% from other races, and 0.49% from two or more races. Hispanic or Latino of any race were 0.91% of the population.

There were 5,882 households, out of which 28.7% had children under the age of 18 living with them, 61.6% were married couples living together, 7.6% had a female householder with no husband present, and 27.7% were non-families. 24.1% of all households were made up of individuals, and 11.8% had someone living alone who was 65 years of age or older. The average household size was 2.50 and the average family size was 2.98.

In the town, the population was spread out, with 20.6% under the age of 18, 14.2% from 18 to 24, 23.1% from 25 to 44, 24.8% from 45 to 64, and 17.3% who were 65 years of age or older. The median age was 40 years. For every 100 females, there were 89.8 males. For every 100 females age 18 and over, there were 86.3 males.

The median income for a household in the town was $50,819, and the median income for a family was $58,620. Males had a median income of $46,748 versus $26,848 for females. The per capita income for the town was $23,275. About 4.3% of families and 5.8% of the population were below the poverty line, including 7.1% of those under age 18 and 7.6% of those age 65 or over.

== Economy ==
Lewiston home to various business, sporting and entertainment venues, including:

- New York Power Authority's Robert Moses Niagara Power Plant. This complex contains a 65-acre (260,000 m^{2}) raised reservoir, a pump-generating plant, and the hydroelectric power plant
- Niagara Falls Country Club, a private country club and golf course, is located in the Lewiston Heights neighborhood of Lewiston, New York.
- Earl W. Brydges Artpark State Park, a 172-acre state park located in the Village of Lewiston that is a venue for summer musical entertainment, in addition to offering picnic tables and pavilions, fishing, hiking, nature trail, a performing arts theater, recreation programs and cross-country skiing.
- Edwin Mellen Press, a Lewiston-based publishing house founded by religion scholar Herbert Richardson

Additionally, Lewiston has three museums:

- The Lewiston Museum
- Castellani Art Museum
- Sanborn Historical Society Museum

== Education ==
=== Universities ===
- Niagara University is located near the border of the City of Niagara Falls
- SUNY Niagara is located near the village of Sanborn in the Town of Cambria.

=== Public schools ===
The Towns of Lewiston and Youngstown are predominantly served by the Lewiston-Porter Central School District, located on Creek Road. As of June 2015, Lewiston-Porter enrolled 2,077 students in K-12 and had district expenditures of $42,234,808. In 2014 Lewiston-Porter Central School District was the highest ranked school district (including both public and private high schools) in Niagara County, and 9th overall in Western New York, in terms of overall academic performance. In 2015, Lewiston-Porter was rated 10th best in Western New York and 2nd in Niagara Country, behind Starpoint Central School District.

Niagara-Wheatfield Central School District also serves the Town of Lewiston with Niagara-Wheatfield High School, Edward Town Middle School, Colonial Village Elementary School, and West Street Elementary School all physically located in the Town of Lewiston.

=== Private schools ===
Within the Town of Lewiston, there are also several private schools:

- Stella Niagara Education Park, a Roman Catholic elementary school
- Sacred Heart Villa School, a school
- St. Peter's Roman Catholic School, a Roman Catholic elementary school

== Infrastructure ==
=== Healthcare ===
There are several health-care facilities in the town. The Catholic Health-run Mount Saint Mary's Hospital (formed in 1907) is a six-floor facility that offers many differing kinds of high-level healthcare. It also includes the "EmStar" emergency health facility. Adjacent to Mt. St. Mary's is the Our Lady of Peace nursing home.

=== Transportation ===
- Interstate 190 This interstate runs in the southwest part of town, from the Town of Niagara to its northern terminus in the Town of Lewiston at the Queenston-Lewiston Bridge which marks the Canada–US border, the highway continues as Ontario Highway 405.
- New York State Route 18 (Creek Road), East-West (North-South Direction) Highway across the town roughly paralleling the Niagara Scenic Pkwy. from the Porter town line to its southern terminus at Lewiston Rd. (NY 104) just outside the Village of Lewiston.
- New York State Route 18F (Lower River Road, Center Street (village)), North-South roadway through the town from the Porter town line through the Village of Lewiston to its southern terminus at NY 104/NY 18. This route roughly parallels the Lower Niagara River north of the Village of Lewiston north to the Town of Porter.
- New York State Route 31 (Saunders Settlement Road), East-West Highway across the southern part of town from the Cambria town line to the Niagara town line just before the routes junction with Military Rd. (NY 265).
- New York State Route 61 (Hyde Park Boulevard), North-South Roadway mostly in the City of Niagara Falls, but has a short distance in the southwest corner of town where the route has its northern end at Lewiston Rd. (NY 104).
- New York State Route 265 (Military Road), North-South roadway through the town from the Niagara town line past the New York Power Authority Generating Plant to its northern terminus at Lewiston Rd. (NY 104).
- New York State Route 429 (Townline Road, Buffalo Street), North-South roadway from the Wheatfield town line to its northern terminus in the town at Ridge Rd. (NY 429).
- Niagara Scenic Parkway, North-South highway through the town from the Niagara Falls city line to the Porter town line.
- New York State Route 104(Ridge Road), East-West roadway runs from the Cambria town line to the Niagara Falls city line

== In popular culture ==
Lewiston is the smallest city in the history of The Amazing Race to host the finish for an edition of this reality show; The Amazing Race: Family edition was completed there.
