= New York State Route 215 (1940s–1970s) =

Former highway in New York

New York State Route 215
- Map of Monroe and Orleans counties with NY 215 highlighted in red

Route information
- Maintained by NYSDOT
- Length: 2.18 mi (3.51 km)
- Existed: early 1940s–early 1970s

Major junctions
- South end: NY 360 in Hamlin
- North end: Hamlin Beach State Park in Hamlin

Location
- Country: United States
- State: New York
- Counties: Monroe

Highway system
- New York Highways; Interstate; US; State; Reference; Parkways
← NY 214	→ NY 215

New York State Route 215 (NY 215) was a north–south state highway located within the town of Hamlin in Monroe County, New York, in the United States. It served as the primary highway to and from Hamlin Beach State Park prior to the construction of the Lake Ontario State Parkway. The southern terminus of the route was at an intersection with NY 360 east of the hamlet of Morton. Its northern terminus was at the park on the shore of Lake Ontario. The entirety of NY 215 was named Redman Road.

NY 215 was assigned in the early 1940s to provide a signed connection between NY 360 and Hamlin Beach State Park. It ceased to exist in the early 1970s once it was severed from the Lake Ontario shoreline by a westward extension of the Lake Ontario State Parkway. However, the remaining portion of NY 215 remained state maintained for another 30 years as New York State Route 941P, an unsigned reference route. Ownership and maintenance of NY 941P was transferred to Monroe County as part of a highway maintenance swap that took effect on November 26, 2007. The former routing of NY 941P is now part of unsigned County Route 236 (CR 236).

== Route description ==
NY 215 began at a three-way intersection with NY 360 east of the hamlet of Morton in the town of Hamlin. NY 360 turned off Redman Road here to follow Morton Road west to the hamlet of Morton while NY 215 headed north on Redman Road. It passed by open, cultivated fields and small pockets of residences as it proceeded through rural northwestern Monroe County. After 1.5 miles (2.4 km), NY 215 intersected Moscow Road, a local highway connecting NY 215 to the then-western end of the Lake Ontario State Parkway.

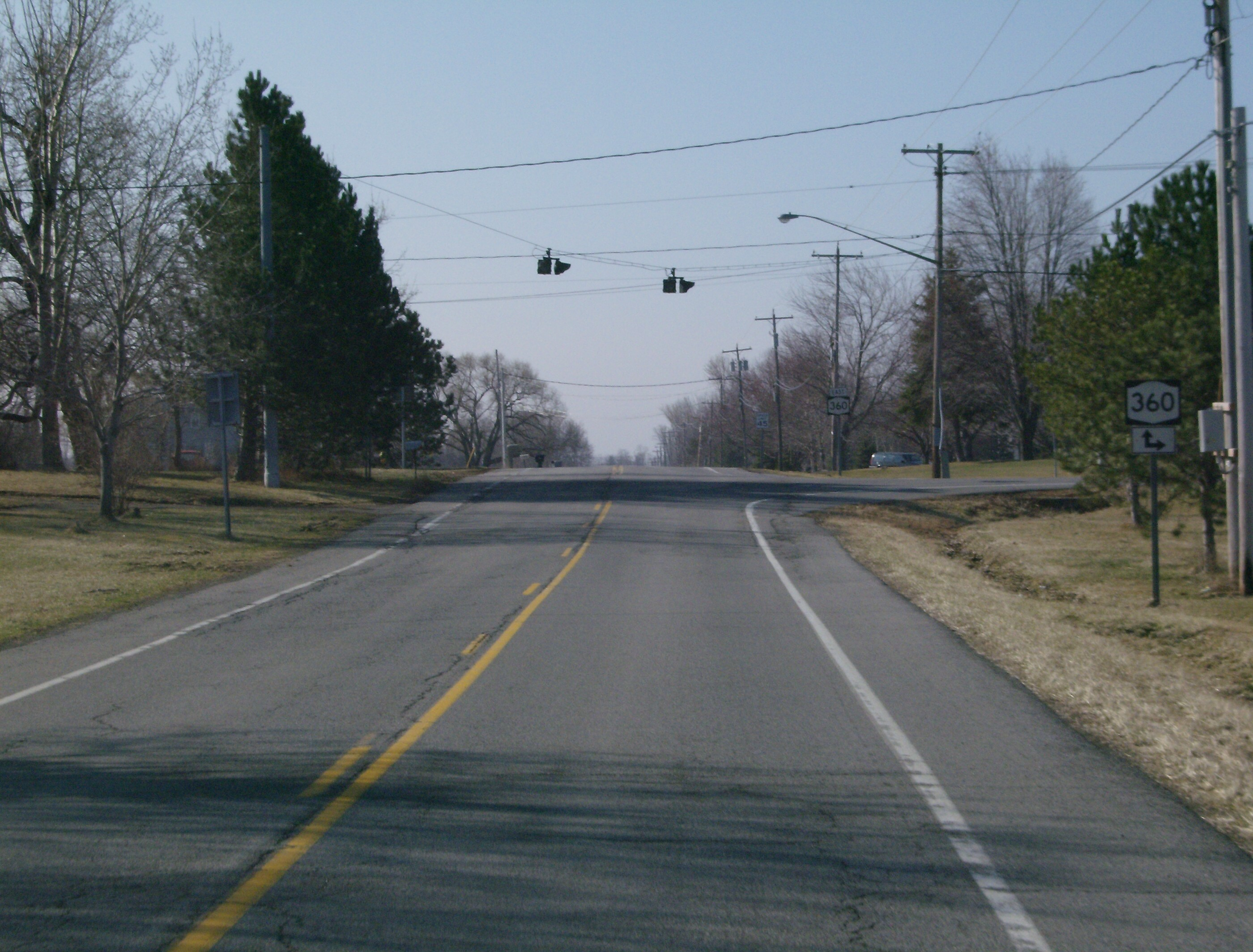
Former southern terminus of NY 215 at NY 360 in Hamlin

North of Moscow Road, the fields on the highway's east side slowly gave way to forested areas as the route approached Hamlin Beach State Park and intersected Cook Road. The route terminated 500 feet (150 m) north of Cook Road at the southern boundary of Hamlin Beach State Park. The physical roadway continued into the park and to nearby Lake Ontario as a local highway.

== History ==
The portion of Redman Road north of modern NY 360 in Hamlin was a state highway as early as 1920; however, it was not assigned a designation until the early 1940s, when it became NY 215. At the time, it was the primary highway to and from Hamlin Beach State Park on the Lake Ontario shoreline, as no continuous east–west lakeside roadway existed at the time. This changed in the late 1940s and early 1950s following the construction of the Lake Ontario State Parkway, a lakeshore highway connecting the park to NY 261 in Greece. The parkway began east of NY 215 at Moscow Road and provided a direct connection to Hamlin Beach State Park from Greece, and eventually Rochester. As a result, NY 215 became merely an alternate route to the park.

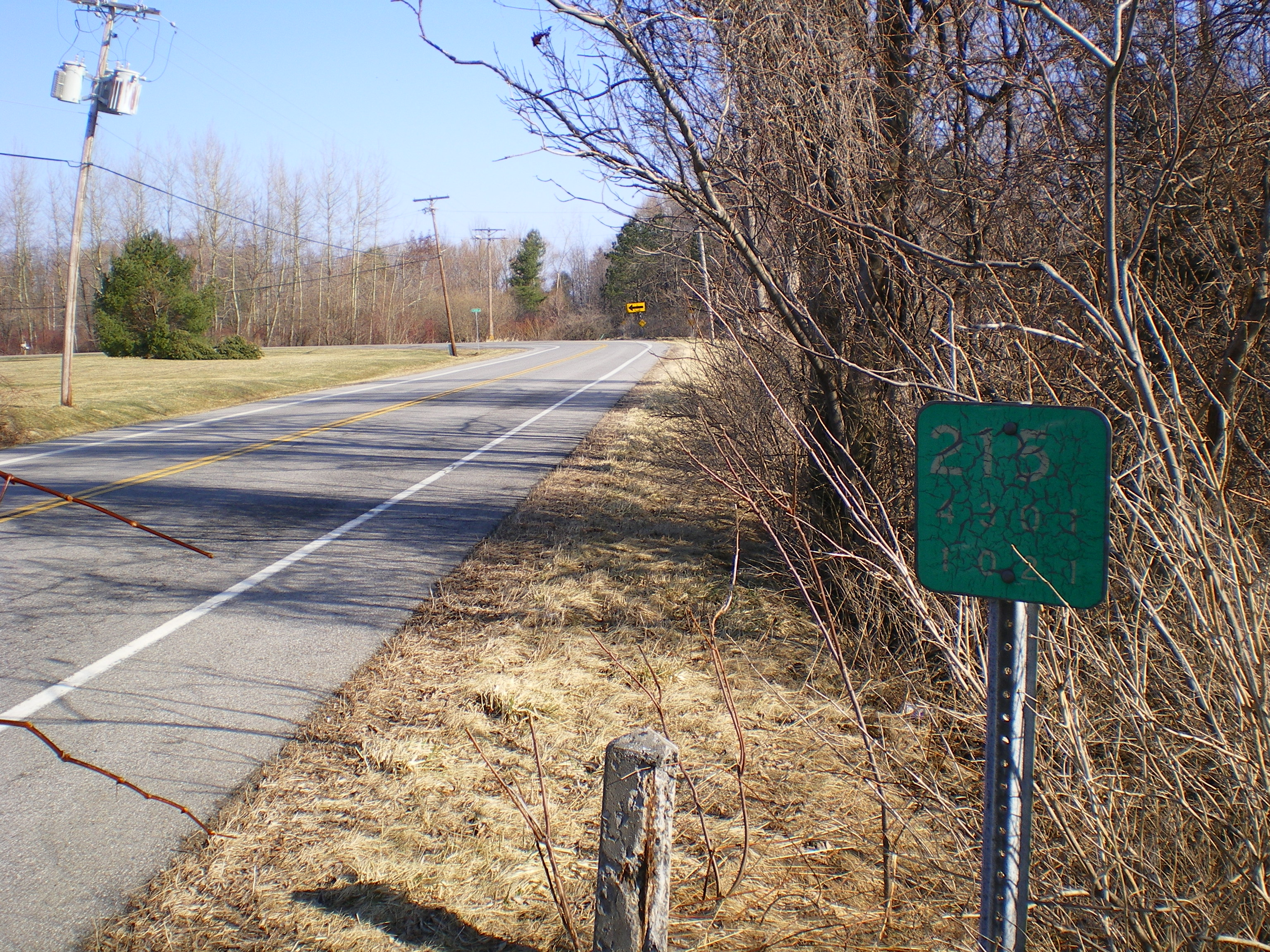
Reference markers for NY 215 are still intact along Redman Road. The above marker is the last on former NY 215 northbound

In the early 1970s, the Lake Ontario State Parkway was extended westward across Monroe and Orleans counties to Lakeside Beach State Park in Carlton. NY 215's connection to Hamlin Beach State Park was severed as part of the construction. As a result, the remaining portion of NY 215 from NY 360 to Cook Road lost its signed route status and was redesignated NY 941P, an unsigned reference route.

The highway remained state maintained until 2007, when ownership and maintenance of it was transferred from the state of New York to Monroe County as part of a highway maintenance swap between the two levels of government. A bill (S4856, 2007) to enact the swap was introduced in the New York State Senate on April 23 and passed by both the Senate and the New York State Assembly on June 20. The act was signed into law by Governor Eliot Spitzer on August 28. Under the terms of the act, it took effect 90 days after it was signed into law; thus, the maintenance swap officially took place on November 26, 2007. The former routing of NY 941P is now part of CR 236.

== Major intersections ==
The entire route was in Hamlin, Monroe County.

mi	km	Destinations	Notes
0.00	0.00	NY 360 (Morton Road / Redman Road)	
1.53	2.46	Moscow Road (CR 211)	To Lake Ontario State Parkway
2.17	3.49	Cook Road	
2.18	3.51	Hamlin Beach State Park	Southwestern park entrance
1.000 mi = 1.609 km; 1.000 km = 0.621 mi
