= New York State Route 272 =

State highway in western New York, US

New York State Route 272
- County Line Road
- Map of Monroe and Orleans Counties with NY 272 highlighted in red

Route information
- Maintained by NYSDOT
- Length: 7.58 mi (12.20 km)
- Existed: 1930–present

Major junctions
- South end: NY 104 on Murray–Clarkson town line
- Lake Ontario State Parkway on Kendall–Hamlin town line
- North end: Dead end at Lake Ontario

Location
- Country: United States
- State: New York
- Counties: Orleans, Monroe

Highway system
- New York Highways; Interstate; US; State; Reference; Parkways
← NY 271	→ NY 273

New York State Route 272 (NY 272) is a north–south state highway in the western portion of New York in the United States. It extends for just over 7.5 miles (12.1 km) along the Orleans–Monroe county line from an intersection with NY 104 in Clarkson to the Lake Ontario shoreline north of an interchange with the Lake Ontario State Parkway in the Hamlin hamlet of Troutburg. The route is two lanes wide for its entire length and passes through mostly rural areas, save for the hamlet of Morton at a junction with Kenmore and Morton Roads (the latter being former NY 360). NY 272 was assigned as part of the 1930 renumbering of state highways in New York and has not been altered since.

== Route description ==
NY 272 begins at an intersection with NY 104 (Ridge Road) on the Orleans–Monroe county line, which also separates the towns of Clarkson and Murray. The two-lane route heads north, passing through open fields and over Sandy Creek to intersect NY 18 at Kendall Mills, a hamlet in the town of Hamlin. NY 18 briefly overlaps NY 272 northward but veers west off the county line and into Kendall south of the dual-town hamlet of Morton. The number of homes and businesses along NY 272 begins to rise during the stretch between Kendall Mills and Morton.

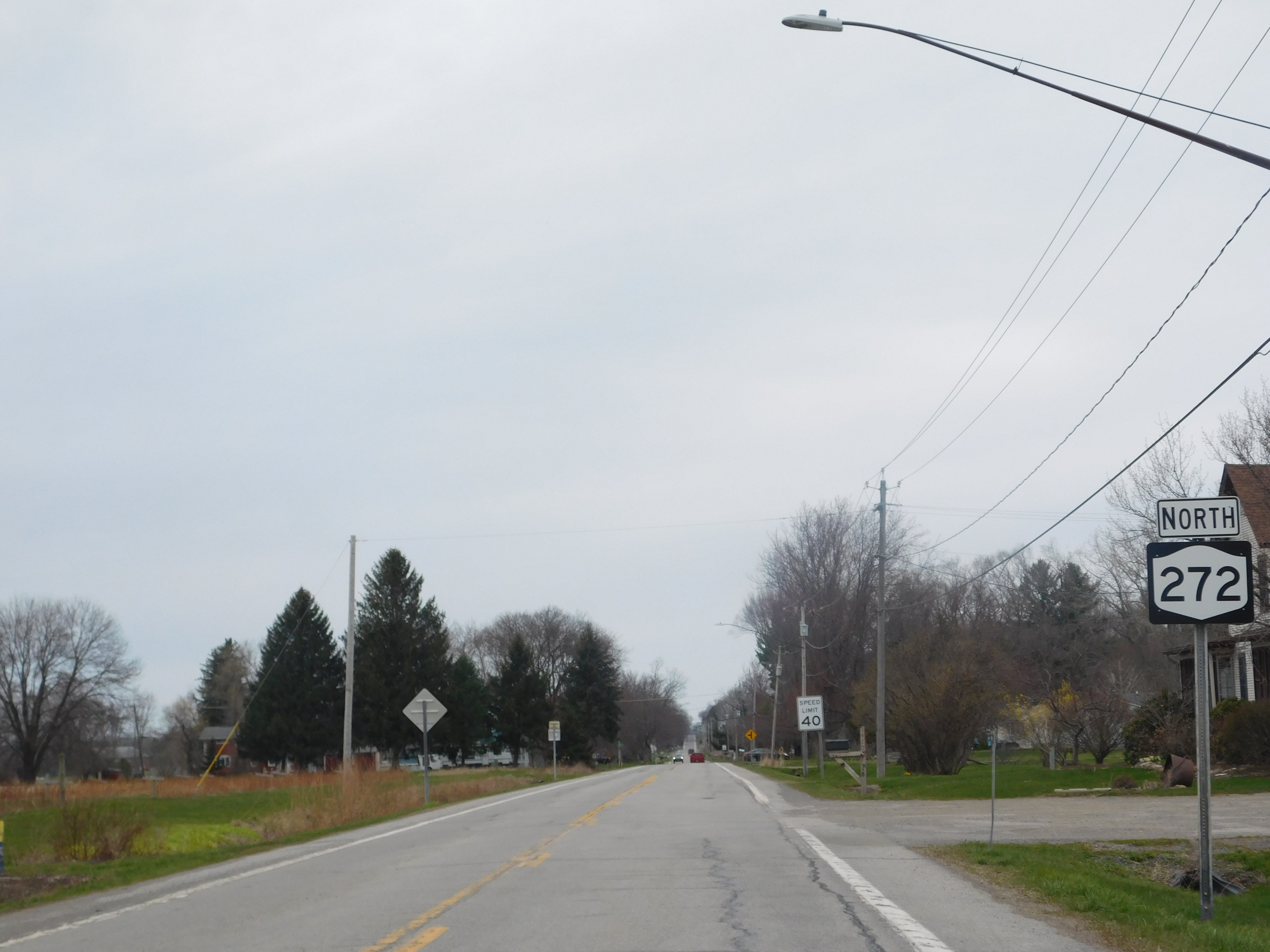
NY 272 northbound in Morton

NY 272 directly serves Morton, a small community situated equally in the town of Kendall and the town of Hamlin. In the center of Morton, NY 272 intersects Morton Road (unsigned County Route 279 and formerly NY 360), which approaches NY 272 from the Monroe County side. North of Morton, the amount of development along the road declines sharply as it heads toward Lake Ontario. NY 272 meets the Lake Ontario State Parkway at an interchange south of the shoreline near the west end of Hamlin Beach State Park. This is the last signed highway that NY 272 intersects; however, NY 272 officially continues to the lakeside hamlet of Troutburg in the town of Hamlin, where it terminates at a dead end at the southern lakeshore.

NY 272 is one of only two state highways in New York that are located wholly along a county boundary. Incidentally, the other one is NY 269 on the other side of Orleans County, which delimits the boundary between Orleans and Niagara Counties.

== History ==
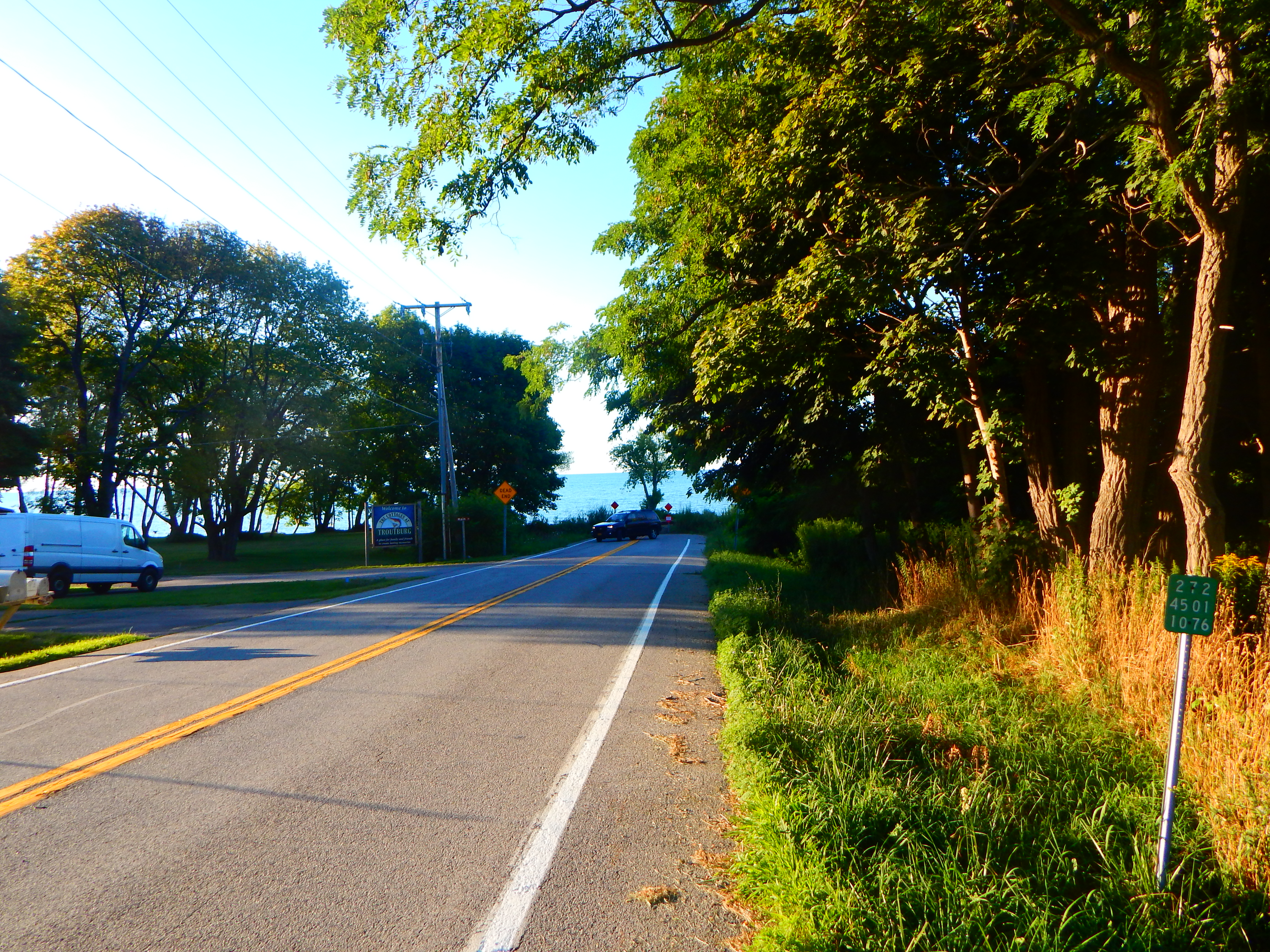
The northern terminus of NY 272 at Lake Ontario in Troutburg. The final reference marker is visible to the right

The portion of the Orleans–Monroe county line road north of Ridge Road was added to the state highway system in stages during the late 1900s and early 1910s. The section north of the Clarkson–Hamlin town line cost $39,531.05 (equivalent to $1,383,440 in 2024) to improve to state highway standards and was accepted into the system on December 1, 1909, as the unsigned State Highway 398 (SH 398). To the south, the piece between Ridge Road and the south end of SH 398 cost $20,199.14 (equivalent to $642,632 in 2024) to bring up to standards and was included in the system on November 12, 1913, as SH 588. Neither SH 398 nor SH 588 were assigned a posted designation until the 1930 renumbering of state highways in New York, when they were collectively designated as NY 272.

== Major intersections ==
The entire route is located on the Orleans–Monroe county line.

Location	mi	km	Destinations	Notes
Murray–Clarkson town line	0.00	0.00	NY 104 (Ridge Road)	Southern terminus
Kendall–Hamlin town line	3.26	5.25	NY 18 east	South end of NY 18 overlap; hamlet of Kendall Mills
Kendall–Hamlin town line	4.24	6.82	NY 18 west	North end of NY 18 overlap
Kendall–Hamlin town line	5.02	8.08	Morton Road (CR 279)	Former NY 360; hamlet of Morton
Kendall–Hamlin town line	7.32	11.78	Lake Ontario State Parkway – Hamlin Beach, Rochester, Lakeside Beach	Interchange
Kendall–Hamlin town line	7.58	12.20	Dead end at Lake Ontario	Northern terminus; hamlet of Troutburg
1.000 mi = 1.609 km; 1.000 km = 0.621 mi: Concurrency terminus
