= New York State Route 360 =

Highway in New York

New York State Route 360
- Map of Monroe and Orleans counties with NY 360 highlighted in red

Route information
- Maintained by Monroe County
- Length: 4.87 mi (7.84 km)
- Existed: c. 1931–February 2012

Major junctions
- West end: NY 272 in Hamlin
- East end: NY 19 in Hamlin

Location
- Country: United States
- State: New York
- Counties: Monroe

Highway system
- New York Highways; Interstate; US; State; Reference; Parkways
← NY 359	→ NY 361

New York State Route 360 (NY 360) was an east–west state highway located in northwestern Monroe County, New York, in the United States. It extended for 4.87 miles (7.84 km) through the town of Hamlin from an intersection with NY 272 at the Monroe–Orleans county line to a junction with NY 19 north of the hamlet of Hamlin. NY 360 intersected the former southern terminus of NY 215 1.50 miles (2.41 km) east of the county line at its northern junction with Redman Road. Most of NY 360 passed through rural areas; however, the easternmost portion of the route was located in a residential neighborhood that comprises the northernmost portion of the hamlet of Hamlin.

The highways that NY 360 followed were originally improved to state highway standards in the 1900s and 1910s and first designated as part of NY 18 as part of the 1930 renumbering of state highways in New York. By the following year, the NY 360 designation was assigned to what is now NY 18 between NY 272 and NY 19. The alignments of NY 18 and NY 360 between those two routes were flipped c. 1933. Ownership and maintenance of NY 360 was transferred from the state of New York to Monroe County on November 26, 2007, as part of a highway maintenance swap between the two levels of government. NY 360 overlapped with four different county routes at various points along its routing until the route was officially deleted as a touring route in February 2012.

== Route description ==
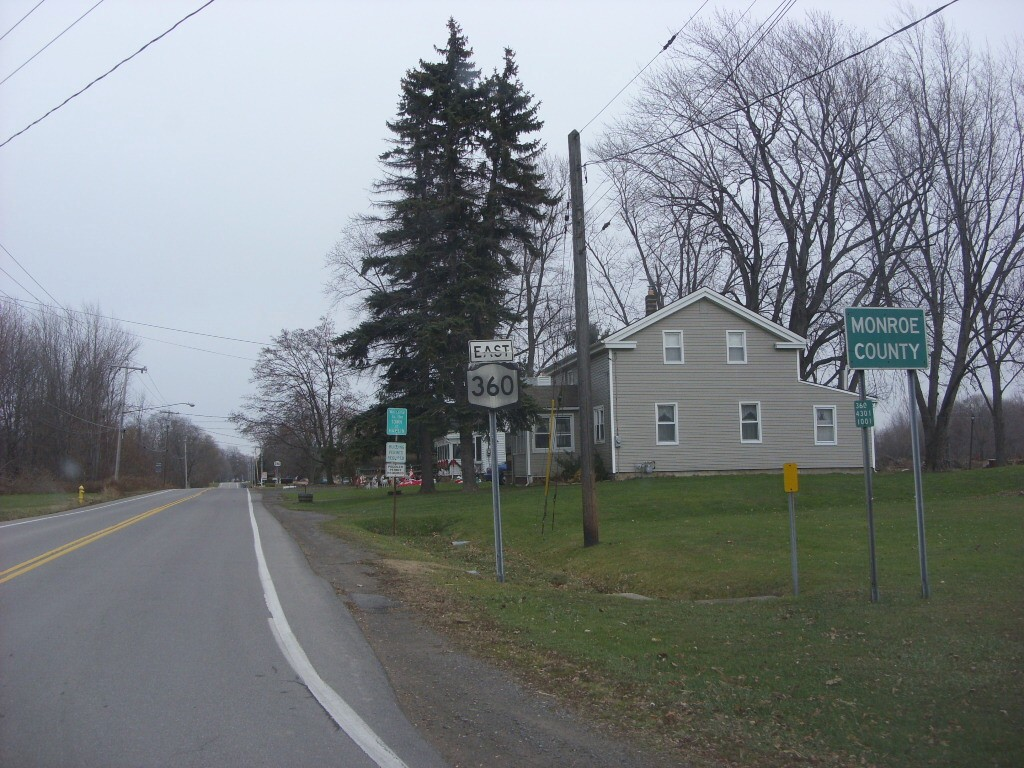
2008 photo of the first reassurance marker on NY 360 eastbound, located just east of NY 272 and the county line

NY 360 began at an intersection with NY 272 at the Monroe–Orleans county line in the town of Hamlin. The route proceeded east on Morton Road, passing through a lightly populated area and crossing a pair of tributaries that feed into Yanty Creek. After 1.50 miles (2.41 km), Morton Road ended at an intersection with Redman Road. This junction was once the southern terminus of NY 215; however, it is now merely a junction between two county-maintained routes. NY 360 turned south here to follow Redman Road for 0.5 miles (0.8 km) before resuming its eastward progression on Church Road.

Like on Morton Road before it, the portion of Church Road that is part of NY 360 was sparsely populated, save for a portion of the road near its junction with Lake Road West Fork. Roughly halfway between Redman Road and Lake Road West Fork, NY 360 passed over Sandy Creek. At Lake Road West Fork, NY 360 veered southeast. As NY 360 continued along the roadway, the amount of development increased as the route approached of the hamlet of Hamlin. North of the hamlet's center, NY 360 met NY 19 (Lake Road East Fork) at a Y-shaped intersection. NY 360 ended here, and NY 19 continued southward into Hamlin as Lake Road.

== History ==
=== Origins and designation ===
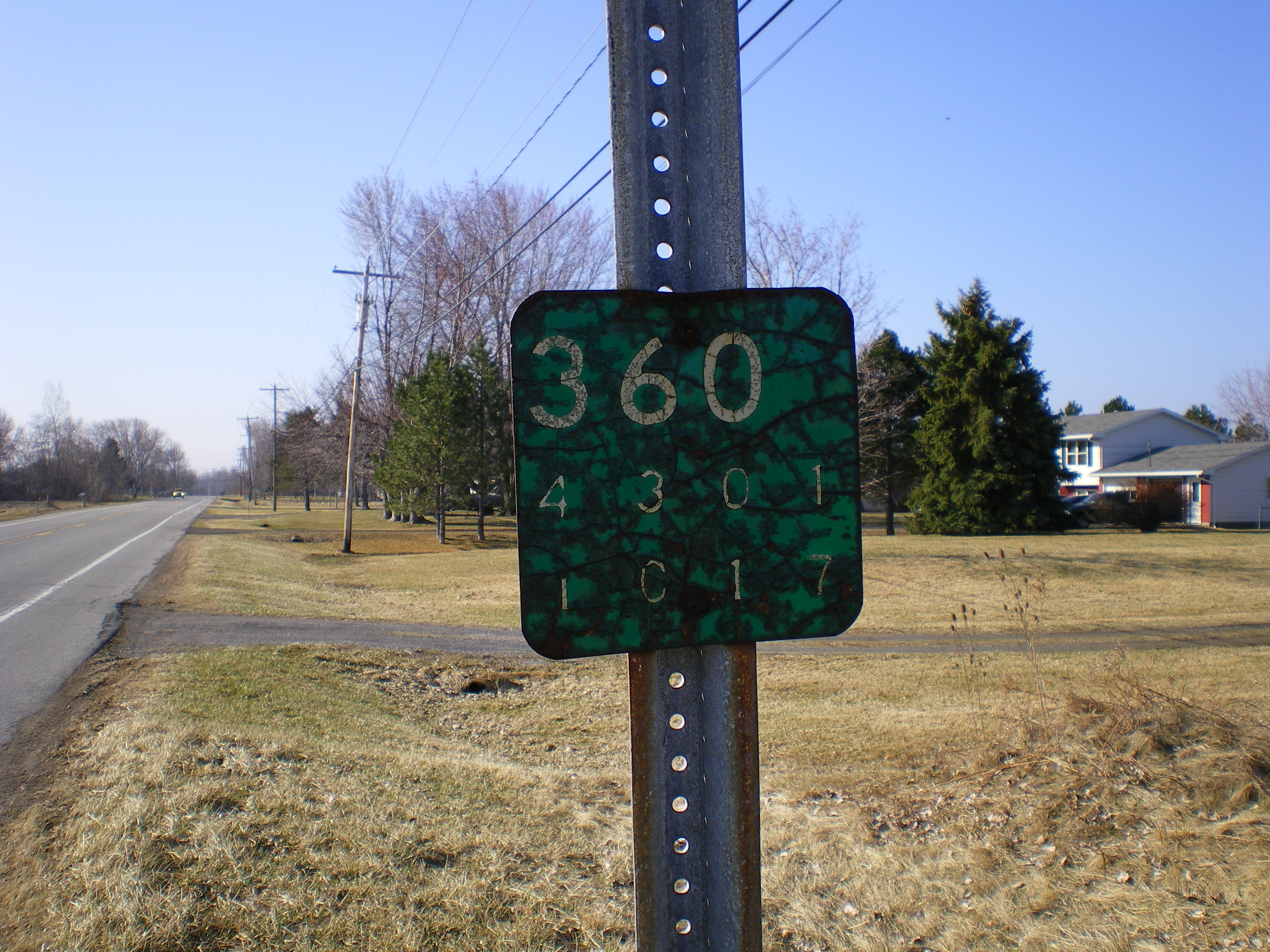
2009 photo of an old reference marker on the Redman Road portion of NY 360

On September 20, 1907, the state of New York let a contract for a project to improve Church Road, the section of Redman Road north of Church Road, and the portion of Lake Road West Fork between Church Road and Lake Road to state highway standards. The project was completed by mid-1909, and the highways, collectively inventoried as State Highway 286 (SH 286), were added to the state highway system on July 20, 1909. On June 8, 1915, the state awarded another contract to bring Morton Road up to state highway standards. Work on the road, internally designated as SH 1282, was completed that year, allowing for the highway to be added to the state highway system on December 8, 1915. The first set of posted state routes in New York were assigned in 1924; however, no designations were assigned to either of the aforementioned highways at this time.

In the 1930 renumbering of state highways in New York, several of the routes assigned during the 1920s were renumbered or modified. At the same time, hundreds of state-maintained highways that did not yet have a route number were assigned one. This included both SH 1282 and the section of SH 286 south of Morton Road as both became part of NY 18, a highway that was extended eastward from Buffalo to Rochester as part of the renumbering. At the time, NY 18 entered the hamlet of Morton on Kenmore Road and followed Morton, Redman, and Church Roads and Lake Road West Fork into Hamlin, where it overlapped with NY 63 (modern NY 19) south along Lake Road to rejoin its modern alignment at Hamlin Center Road. By the following year, NY 360 was assigned to what is now NY 18 between NY 272 and Lake Road (then-NY 63) in Hamlin. The alignments of NY 18 and NY 360 between Morton and Hamlin were flipped c. 1933, placing both highways on their modern routings.

=== Transfer of maintenance ===
In 2007, ownership and maintenance of NY 360 was transferred from the state of New York to Monroe County as part of a highway maintenance swap between the two levels of government. A bill (S4856, 2007) to enact the swap was introduced in the New York State Senate on April 23 and passed by both the Senate and the New York State Assembly on June 20. The act was signed into law by Governor Eliot Spitzer on August 28. Under the terms of the act, it took effect 90 days after it was signed into law; thus, the maintenance swap officially took place on November 26, 2007.

As a result of the change in maintenance, NY 360 became part of four unsigned county routes. On Morton Road, NY 360 was co-designated as County Route 279 (CR 279). The portion on Redman Road was part of CR 236, which extends from NY 31 west of Brockport to Cook Road near the Lake Ontario State Parkway. The section of NY 360 on Church Road overlapped with CR 277. Finally, the part of NY 360 on Lake Road West Fork was concurrent with CR 234, which extends north past NY 360 to Moscow Road (CR 211). All four overlaps were eliminated when the NY 360 designation was officially removed in February 2012, and the NY 360 shields were removed by June of that year.

== Major intersections ==
The entire route was in Hamlin, Monroe County.

mi	km	Destinations	Notes
0.00	0.00	NY 272	
1.50	2.41	Redman Road (CR 236)	Former NY 215
4.87	7.84	NY 19	Hamlet of Hamlin
1.000 mi = 1.609 km; 1.000 km = 0.621 mi

== See also ==
- List of county routes in Monroe County, New York
