= New York State Route 18 =

Highway in New York

New York State Route 18
- Map of western New York with NY 18 highlighted in red

Route information
- Maintained by NYSDOT, Monroe County and the city of Rochester
- Length: 87.40 mi (140.66 km)
- Existed: 1924–present
- Tourist routes: Great Lakes Seaway Trail

Major junctions
- West end: NY 104 in Lewiston
- Niagara Scenic Parkway in Youngstown; NY 78 in Olcott; NY 390 in Greece
- East end: NY 104 in Rochester

Location
- Country: United States
- State: New York
- Counties: Niagara, Orleans, Monroe

Highway system
- New York Highways; Interstate; US; State; Reference; Parkways
← NY 17M	→ NY 18A

New York State Route 18 (NY 18) is an east–west state highway in western New York in the United States. It runs parallel to the south shore of Lake Ontario for most of its length between Niagara County and Monroe County. NY 18, which also passes through Orleans County, acts as a northerly alternate to NY 104, another east–west route that parallels NY 18 to the south on Ridge Road. The western terminus of NY 18 is at a complex grade-separated interchange with NY 104 outside the village of Lewiston. Its eastern terminus is at a junction with NY 104 in an area of Rochester known as Eastman Business Park.

NY 18 was assigned in 1924 and originally extended from the Pennsylvania state line near Salamanca to downtown Buffalo via Dayton and Hamburg. It was extended northeast to Rochester via Niagara Falls as part of the 1930 renumbering of state highways in New York and east to NY 250 in the town of Webster by the following year. NY 18 was truncated on its west end to the town of Lewiston in the early 1960s and on its east end to Rochester in the early 1970s.

Although NY 18 is signed as east–west, it runs primarily north–south through the western portion of Niagara County. After leaving Niagara County, NY 18 shifts farther south, gradually moving away from the shore of Lake Ontario. In central Orleans County, NY 18 meets the Lake Ontario State Parkway at the Lakeside Beach State Park. The parkway then becomes the lakeside road, and NY 18 veers south to follow a more inland routing.

== Route description ==
=== Niagara County ===
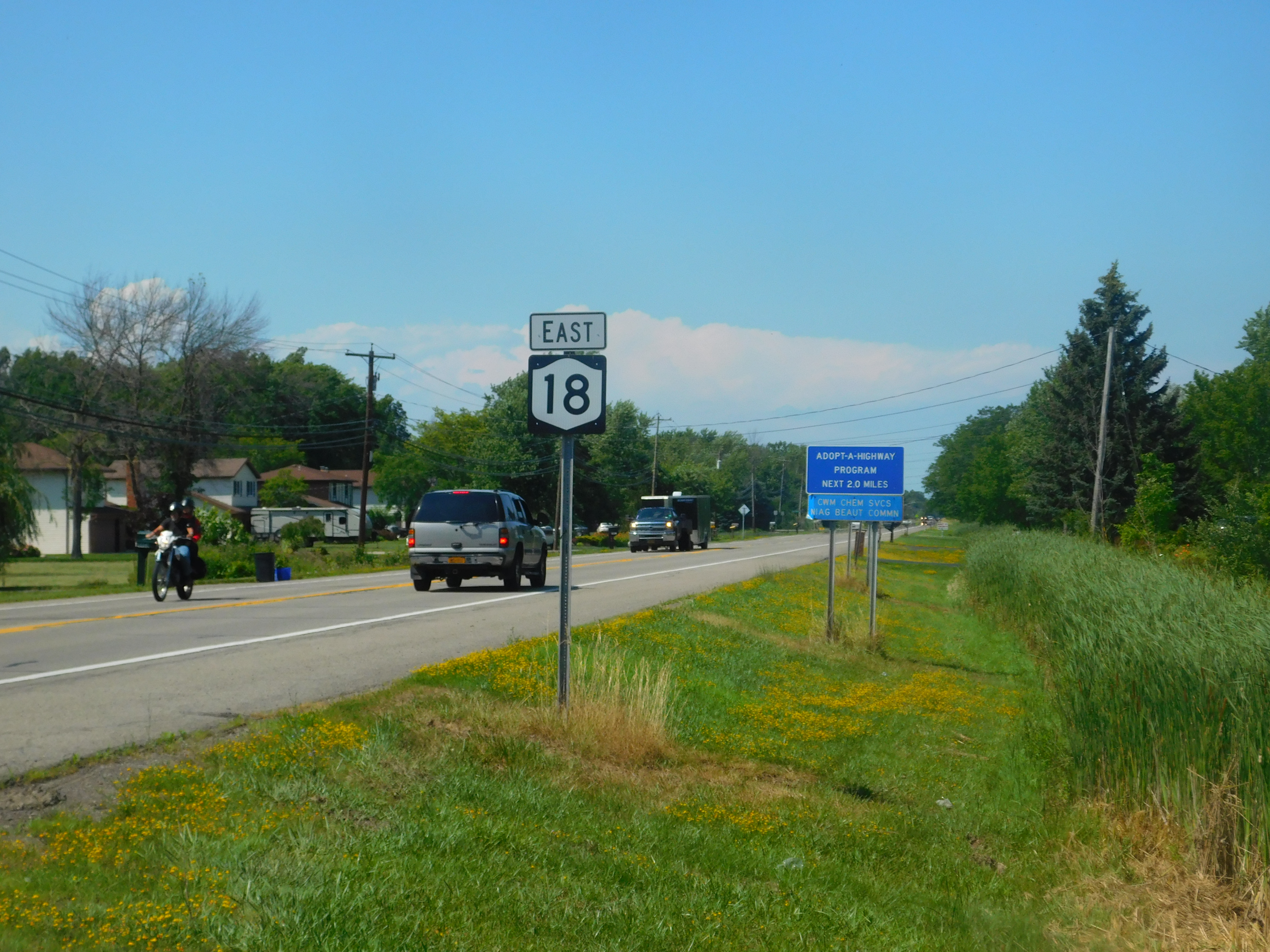
NY 18 northwest of Model City

NY 18 begins at a junction with NY 104 south of a complex grade-separated interchange that includes NY 18F, NY 104, and the Niagara Scenic Parkway on the eastern edge of the village of Lewiston. From NY 104 east, a right-turn ramp allows access to Creek Road Extension, the first street that modern-day NY 18 occupies. NY 104 continues north from the ramp, passing over NY 18 westbound (which terminates at the merge ramp with NY 104 west) on its way to the village while NY 18 proceeds to the northeast on Creek Road Extension, bypassing Lewiston to the southeast. After 0.5 miles (0.8 km), the highway curves to the north and meets NY 104 at an unconventional grade-separated interchange that has a pair of two-way ramps connecting the two state routes. NY 18 continues on, passing under NY 104 and paralleling the Niagara Scenic Parkway as it proceeds north.

At a wye in the Porter hamlet of Blairville, NY 18 breaks from its north–south alignment and turns to the northeast before curving northward once more, returning to a perfect north–south alignment at an intersection with NY 93 in the hamlet of Towers Corners. Southwest of the Four Mile Creek State Park, NY 18 turns a full 90 degrees to the east and begins to parallel the southern shore of Lake Ontario. Here, NY 18 meets the northern terminus of NY 18F, changes names from Creek Road to Lake Road, and becomes part of the Seaway Trail, a National Scenic Byway. The route proceeds northeast to Four Mile Creek State Park, where it intersects the northern end of the Niagara Scenic Parkway. East of the park, NY 18 gradually moves to the north, decreasing the area between the route and the lakeshore as it proceeds east.

Now in Wilson and less than 100 yards (91 m) from the lakeshore, NY 18 meets the northern terminus of NY 425. Farther east, in Olcott, NY 18 intersects the northern extent of NY 78. On the eastern edge of town, the route intersects Transit Road, which runs along the transit line first surveyed by the Holland Land Company. This portion of Transit Road does not meet the NY 78-occupied portion in Lockport, however. After meeting the northern end of NY 148 in Somerset, NY 18 intersects the northern terminus of NY 269 at the Niagara–Orleans County line.

=== Orleans County ===
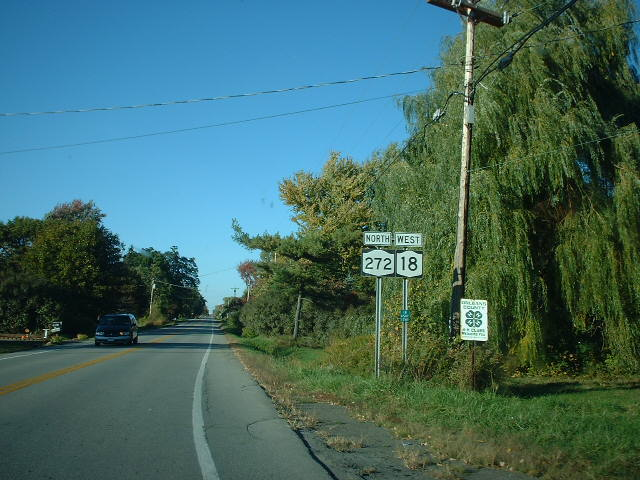
Northbound on NY 18 (west) and NY 272 along the Orleans–Monroe County line

Across the county line, NY 18 becomes the Roosevelt Highway. It continues across the northern edge of the county and the southern fringe of Lake Ontario, meeting the northern terminus of NY 63 in Yates Center, north of Lyndonville. While NY 63 ends here, Lyndonville Road continues north to the lake as County Route 63-1 (CR 63-1). This portion of Lyndonville Road was once part of NY 63. In Carlton, NY 18 intersects the northern terminus of NY 279, the last in a series of north–south routes that terminate at NY 18. Not far to the east, the route serves Lakeside Beach State Park and indirectly connects to the western terminus of the Lake Ontario State Parkway. At this point, the Seaway Trail leaves NY 18 to follow the parkway along the lakeshore.

East of the park, NY 18 breaks from the Lake Ontario shore and begins to make its way southward, curving to the southeast as it meets NY 98 north of the hamlet of Baldwin Corner. The routes converge to form a concurrency south to the hamlet, where NY 18 continues east. At the Carlton–Kendall town line, NY 18 curves southeastward once again before reverting to an easterly alignment in Kendall. After passing NY 237 south of the hamlet of Kendall, NY 18 intersects NY 272 at the Orleans–Monroe County line. NY 18 merges onto the county line road, overlapping NY 272 along the county line for just under 1 mile (1.6 km) to the continuation of Roosevelt Highway, where NY 18 continues east into Monroe County.

=== Monroe County ===
NY 18 remains Roosevelt Highway until Hamlin–Parma Town Line Road, where is becomes West Avenue. In the hamlet of Hamlin, it meets NY 19. NY 18 passes NY 260 before swerving northward onto West Avenue at the Hamlin–Parma town line and proceeding eastward toward the village of Hilton. In Hilton, NY 18 meets NY 259 (Lake Avenue) in the center of the village. The two routes overlap for a short distance east along Main Street before turning south to exit the village on South Avenue.

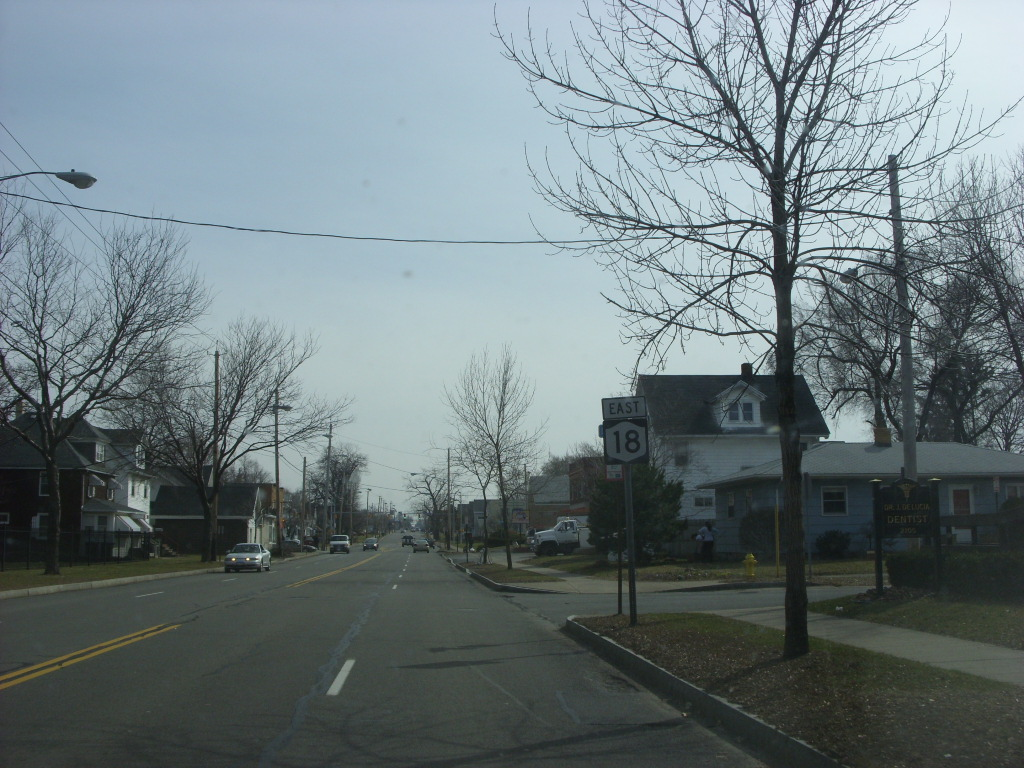
NY 18 eastbound in Rochester about a half-mile north of NY 104

NY 18 and NY 259, now named Hilton–Parma Corners Road, remain concurrent until Parma Center, where NY 18 turns east to follow Parma Center Road for roughly 2 miles (3.2 km) through a rural portion of Parma. Parma Center Road ends upon intersecting NY 261 (Manitou Road) at the Parma–Greece town line; as a result, NY 18 joins NY 261 for one block southward before returning east on Latta Road and entering the Rochester suburb of Greece. NY 18 passes through the rural northwestern part of the town and the more developed, densely populated northeastern section, meeting NY 390 at exit 26 in the latter. The junction is the northernmost exit on NY 390 prior to its merging with the Lake Ontario State Parkway to the north.

A small distance east of NY 390, NY 18 passes Greece Arcadia High School and intersects Mount Read Boulevard in the hamlet of Mount Read before intersecting Dewey Avenue a half-mile to the east. NY 18 turns south onto Dewey Avenue; however, state maintenance continues to follow Latta Road east to where it crosses into the Rochester city limits at Charlotte. This section of Latta Road is designated as NY 941A, an unsigned reference route. NY 18, meanwhile, becomes maintained by Monroe County as part of CR 132, an unsigned designation that follows Dewey Avenue north to its end at the Lake Ontario shoreline. The route continues south on Dewey Avenue to the Rochester city line, where CR 132 ends and maintenance of the route shifts to the city of Rochester. NY 18 ends about 1 mile (1.6 km) later at a junction with NY 104 in an industrialized area known as Eastman Business Park.

== History ==
=== Origins and early changes ===
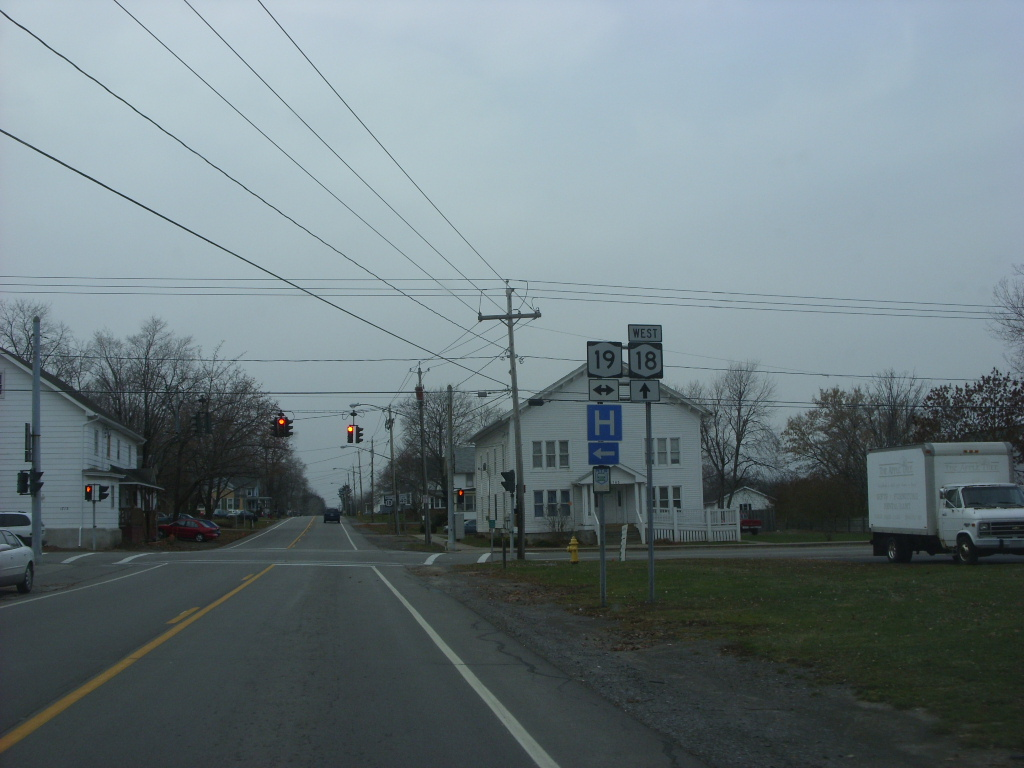
Looking west at the junction of NY 18 and NY 19 in Hamlin. NY 18 initially turned right here and followed modern NY 19 and the now-decommissioned NY 360 into Orleans County.

In 1908, the New York State Legislature created Route 18, an unsigned legislative route that ran from the Pennsylvania state line at Ripley to the mouth of the Niagara River north of Youngstown with a gap through the city of Buffalo. North of Buffalo, Route 18 followed Niagara Falls Boulevard (modern NY 950K and U.S. Route 62 or US 62) to Niagara Falls and current NY 104 and NY 18F between Niagara Falls and Lake Ontario. When the first set of posted routes in New York were assigned in 1924, the portion of legislative Route 18 north of Buffalo became the basis for NY 34, which began at Main Street (NY 5) in Buffalo and followed the path of legislative Route 18 through Niagara Falls and along the Niagara River to Lake Ontario. NY 18 was assigned at the same time; however, it initially went from the Pennsylvania state line at Limestone north to Buffalo along what is now US 219, NY 417, NY 353 and US 62. In Cattaraugus County, NY 18 initially followed Leon and New Albion Roads between Cattaraugus and Little Valley.

NY 18 was extended northeastward to Rochester as part of the 1930 renumbering of state highways in New York, effectively doubling the route's length. Instead of ending at the junction of Ohio and Main Streets (the latter then part of NY 5) in downtown Buffalo, NY 18 now overlapped with NY 5 along Main Street north to Niagara Falls Boulevard, where it turned north and proceeded to Lake Ontario over NY 34. At Youngstown, the route turned east, following a previously unnumbered alignment along the lakeshore to Rochester, where it ended at NY 31 (now NY 104) in Kodak Park. The route was extended further eastward to NY 250 in Webster by the following year by way of East Ridge Road, Culver Road, and Lake Road. NY 18 was never extended eastward past its junction with NY 250.

While the general routing of NY 18 between Youngstown and Rochester was the same in 1930 as it is now, it initially followed a slightly different alignment through eastern Orleans County and western Monroe County. NY 18 broke from its current alignment at Carr Road and followed Carr, Kenmore and Kendall Roads through the town of Kendall to the hamlet of Morton, from where it continued to Hamlin via the now-decommissioned NY 360 and NY 19. Additionally, NY 18 utilized Hamlin Center Road and what is now NY 260 between Hamlin and Roosevelt Highway.

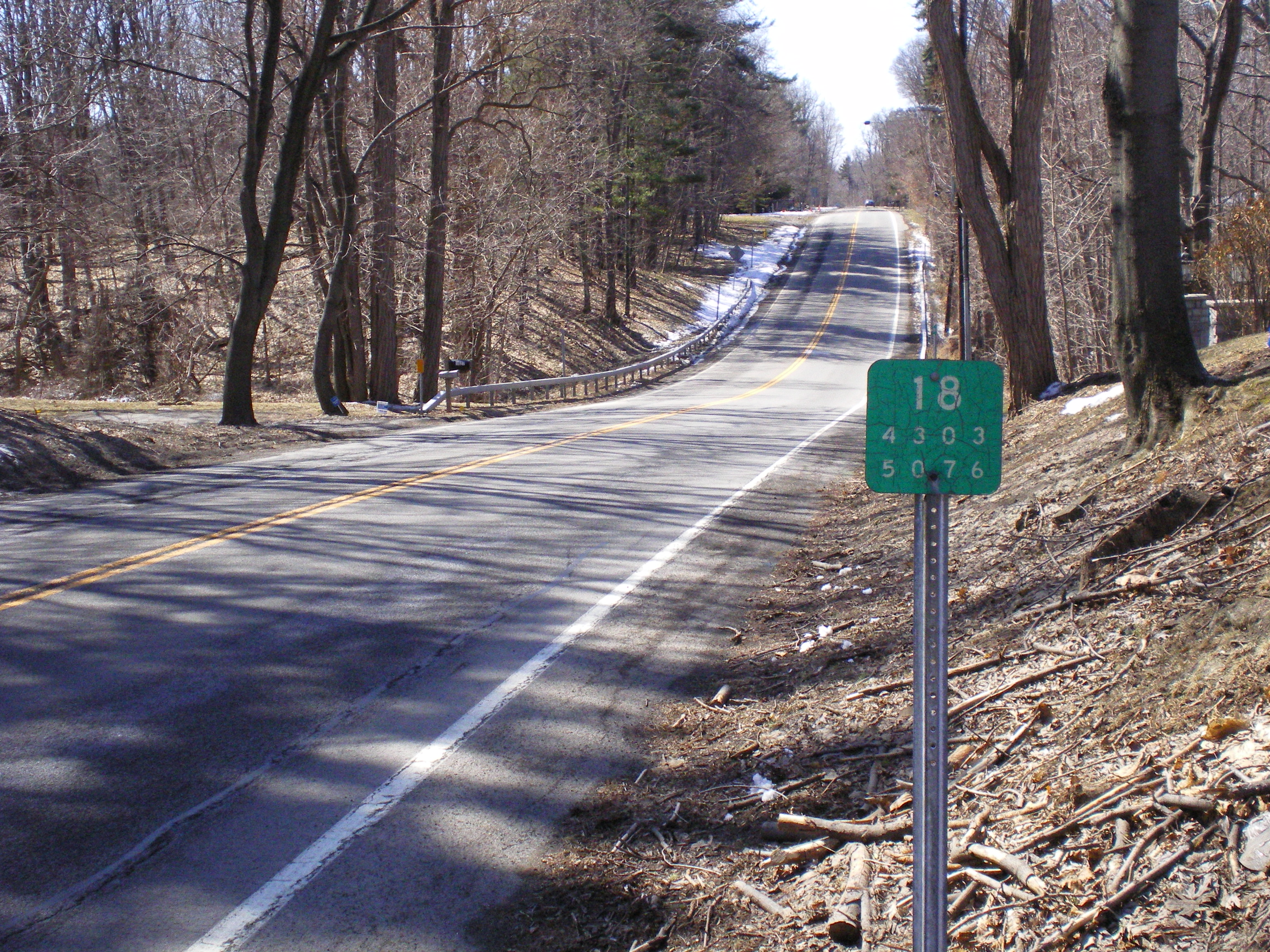
March 2008 photo of a reference marker for NY 18 on Lake Road in Webster

The majority of NY 18's routing south of the village of Lewiston was incorporated into the U.S. Highway System in the early 1930s after US 62 and US 219 were extended into New York and US 104 was assigned. NY 18 now began concurrent to US 219 at the state line and overlapped the route northward to the city of Salamanca. US 219 left NY 18 here, and the latter continued independently to the town of Dayton, where it intersected US 62. From there, US 62 followed NY 18 north to a junction with US 104 (Main Street) in Niagara Falls. US 62 ended here, and NY 18 became concurrent to US 104 upon turning onto Main Street. The overlap ended in the village of Lewiston, where US 104 turned east to follow Ridge Road instead.

=== Realignments and truncation ===
By 1931, NY 18 was realigned to follow its current alignment between Hamlin and the Parma town line while the modern routing of NY 18 between the Orleans County line and Hamlin was designated as NY 360. The alignments of NY 360 and NY 18 between NY 272 and Hamlin were flipped c. 1933, placing both routes on their modern routings through Hamlin. NY 18 was moved onto its present routing through Kendall c. 1938, bypassing the hamlets of Kendall and Morton to the south. In the Buffalo area, NY 18 was realigned twice in the 1930s: first by 1935 to bypass downtown to the east on Bailey Avenue between Abbott Road and Main Street and again in the late 1930s to use Bailey Avenue and Eggert Road between Main Street and Niagara Falls Boulevard. The Cattaraugus–Little Valley segment of the route was realigned c. 1934 to travel directly between the two locations. Its former routing via New Albion became NY 18F; however, that designation was eliminated c. 1938, and ownership of the New Albion route was transferred to Cattaraugus County, which has maintained it as portions of County Routes 5 and 6 ever since.

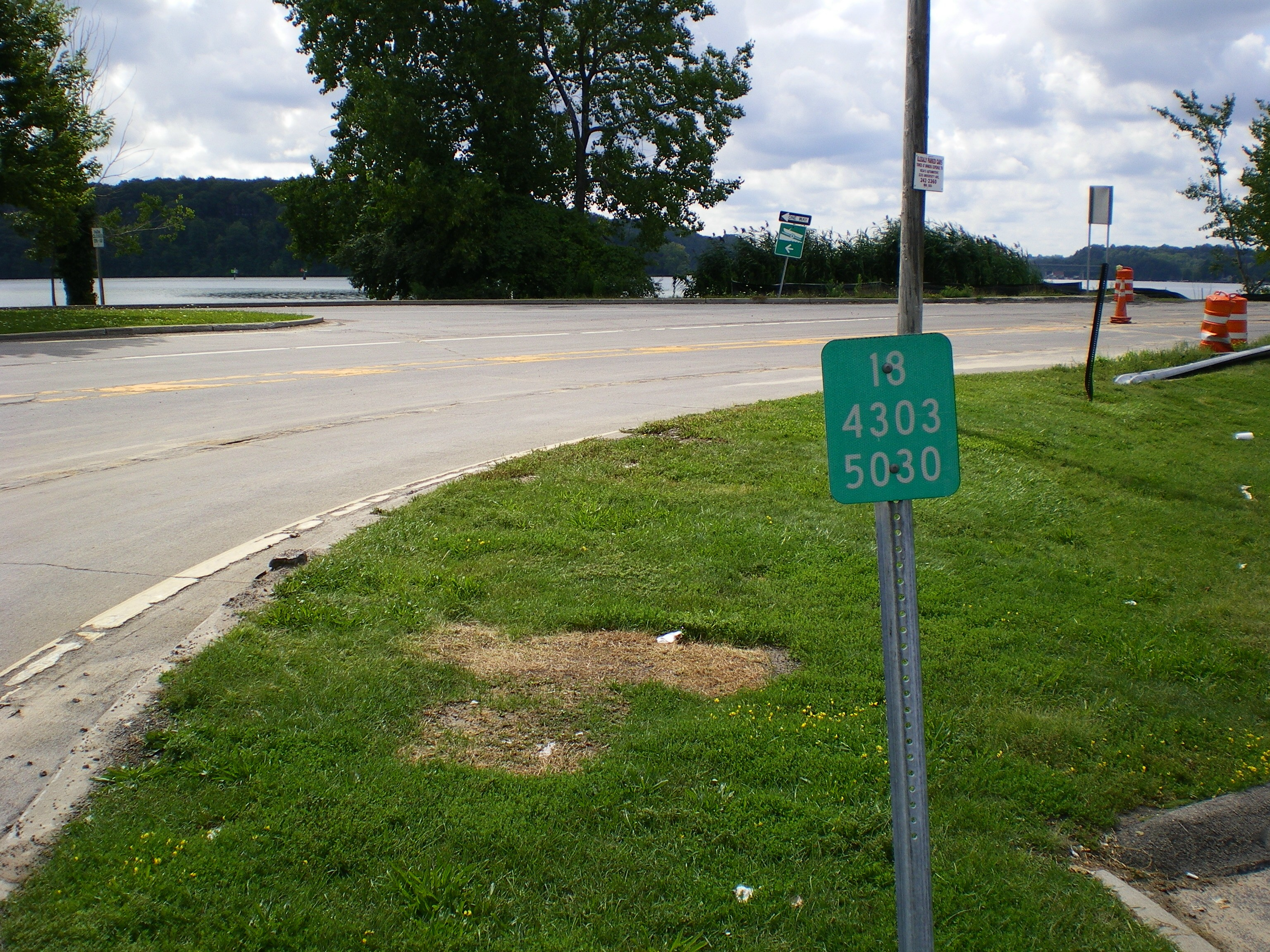
August 2009 photo of a reference marker for NY 18 on NY 590 in Irondequoit

NY 18 was rerouted between Lewiston and Youngstown on January 1, 1949, to follow a more inland highway through western Niagara County. The former routing of NY 18 alongside the Niagara River was redesignated as NY 18F. To the east in Rochester, NY 18 was realigned in the early 1950s to follow East Ridge Road east to the then-southern terminus of the Sea Breeze Expressway. The route turned north, following the highway to its end at Culver Road, where it rejoined its pre-expressway alignment. The western terminus of NY 18 was moved north to its present location in Lewiston on January 1, 1962, eliminating the three lengthy overlaps that existed between Pennsylvania and Lewiston. The lone independent portion of NY 18 south of Lewiston was renumbered NY 353.

On January 1, 1970, NY 47 was extended northward to encompass the entirety of the now-complete Sea Breeze Expressway, creating an overlap with NY 18 between Ridge and Culver Roads. Prior to the extension, NY 47 had ended at Empire Boulevard (US 104, now NY 404). The overlap proved to be temporary as NY 18 was truncated westward c. 1973 to its current eastern terminus in Kodak Park. The former routing of NY 18 between NY 590 and NY 250 was redesignated as NY 941L, an unsigned reference route. East Ridge Road, meanwhile, was now devoid of any designations as US 104 had been shifted onto the Keeler Street Expressway several years before. As a result, ownership and maintenance of the Irondequoit section of East Ridge Road was transferred to Monroe County, which designated it as the unsigned CR 241. Culver Road, meanwhile, is now CR 120.

=== Olcott realignment ===
The alignment of NY 18 through Olcott Beach dated back to the early 1800s, starting with a foot bridge over Eighteen Mile Creek in 1811, built out of wood. This was replaced by a white oak frame bridge built in 1825 for $500 (1825 USD) for the use of transporting wagons across the creek. General James Weisner contracted to build the bridge, which was 77 feet (23 m) wide, along with 20 20-foot (6.1 m) long spans. That bridge was replaced in 1878 by an iron structure with dimensions of 100 by 22 feet (30.5 m × 6.7 m). This new span was a swing bridge, compared to the prior fixed structures. The New York State Department of Public Works replaced that structure with another fixed span in 1935. This span was too low to the water line, causing a bottleneck of boats and ships entering Eighteen Mile Creek. This two-lane structure was a 160-foot (49 m) long structure, that also caused a bottleneck for drivers because there became no parking in Olcott.

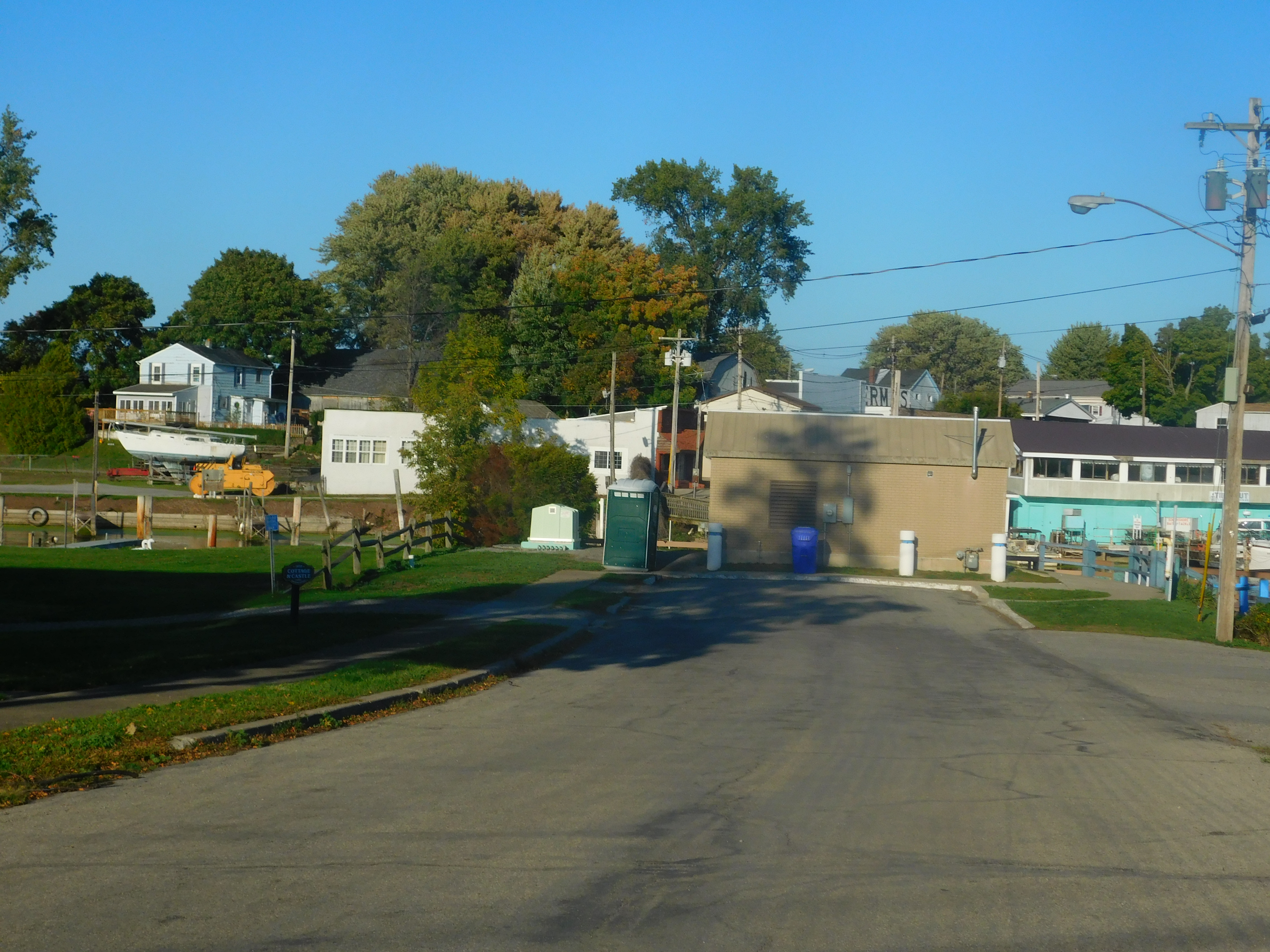
Former NY 18 alignment in Olcott approaching the old bridge built in 1935

Frustration grew in the 1960s to this low-level bridge. This involved a community movement to get a new bridge built through Olcott in 1966. This would involve razing the former span from 1935 and opening Eighteen Mile Creek back to the boaters who could not fit under the span. The creek, navigable from nearby Burt, would get more use without the bridge blocking the boats from entering. A new bridge would need to be a 40–50 feet (12–15 m) high, compared to 3–4 feet (0.91–1.22 m), which the older structure was. Residents felt that if they got a new bridge built, they could make at least $60,00 for attracting schooners to Olcott. They felt that with boat owners, Olcott's average income would skyrocket to $500,000 a year. The construction of a new bridge would expand the harbor in Olcott overall. The petition for a new bridge attracted almost 400 signatures from local residents, boaters and landowners.

This petition reached State Senator Earl W. Brydges, a resident of Wilson. He drafted legislation to fund $500,000 to the Department of Public Works to construct a new bridge in Olcott. Assemblyman V. Sumner Carroll of Niagara Falls followed with the Assembly. Initial estimates for a new bridge, located south of the current structure, would be $370,000. This would keep traffic flow from being interrupted for construction, building an improved alignment of NY 18. The right-of-way costs would be cheaper and the harbor would have a new structure to appease the design of the area.

By February 1967 the support for a new bridge grew locally. The bridge, which now cost over $1.75 million to build, would be 50 feet (15 m) high. Engineers suggested that 32 feet (9.8 m) would be the highest rebuilding the current structure could go. Engineers also considered alternate concepts, but the design of the area prohibited any options besides a new bridge. This new bridge would involve building an approach at West Creek Road near the local water tower. This would bypass downtown Olcott to the south, crossing Eighteen Mile Creek before reaching a junction with NY 78 850 feet (260 m) south of the current intersection between NY 18 and NY 78. The alignment would then cross Franklin Street and through nearby Krull Park where it would meet then-current NY 18. This new alignment would be 1 mile (1.6 km) long, coming at the cost of 16 structures. This would include farm buildings, barber shop, gas station and a few homes. Some locals asked if the construction would be superfluous with the construction of the nearby Lake Ontario State Parkway, which they stated would be several miles south of Olcott.

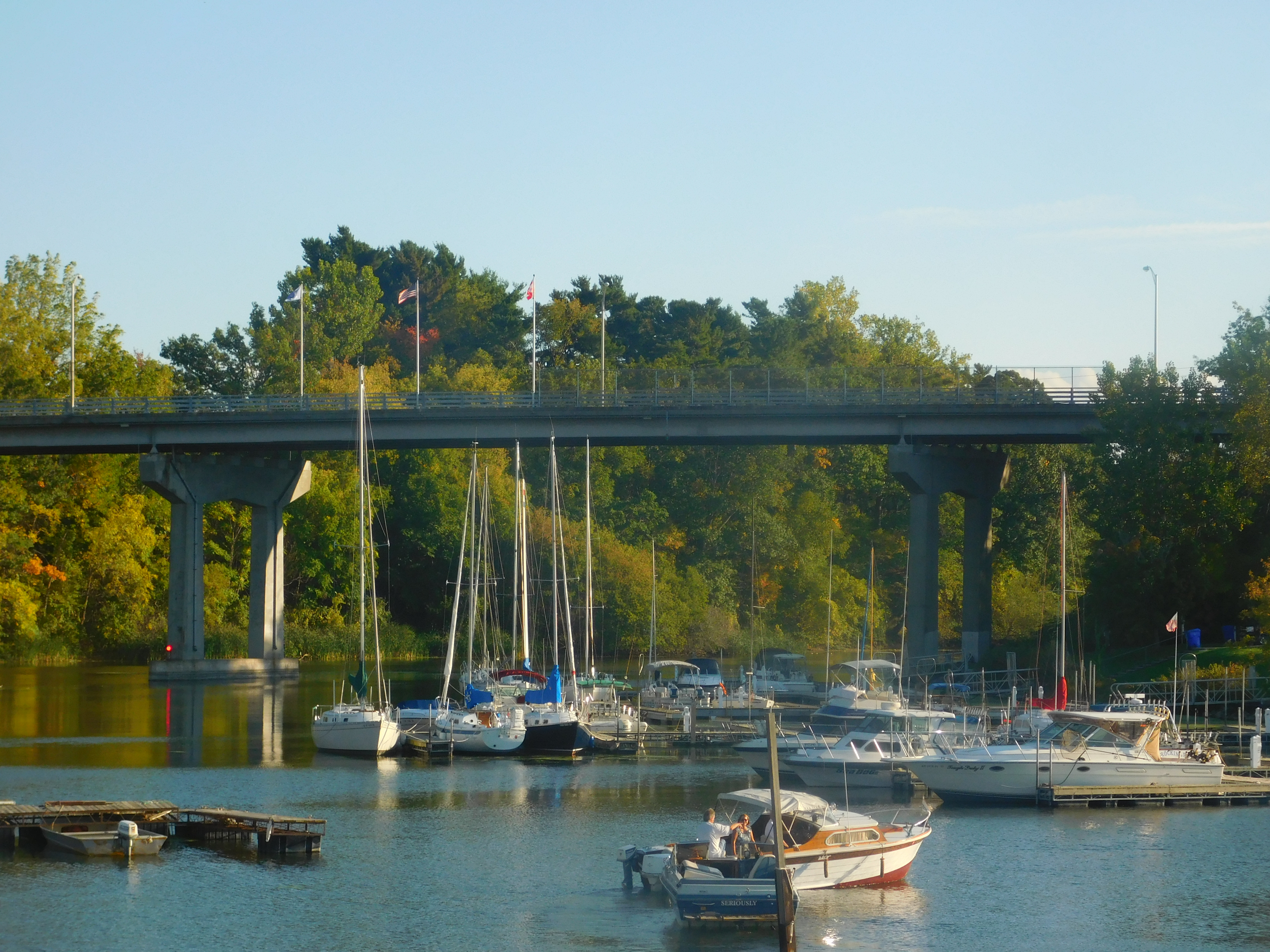
The new bridge over Eighteen Mile Creek built in Olcott from 1968–1970, seen from the old structure's location upstream

By January 1968, the number of properties affected rose to 67, with 20 homes affected in various fashions. The new bridge would cost $1.1 million, would be 525 feet (160 m) long, with four lanes 12 feet (3.7 m) wide. The new approaches to the bridge would cost $1.4 million to build. At that point, the Department of Public Works speculated construction would begin in 1968. Meanwhile, money was granted for the study of widening the Olcott harbor channel for boaters. On June 21, 1968, it was announced that the Tuscarora Construction Company of Amherst made a winning $2,578,783 bid for construction of the bridge and its approaches.

Construction began in August 1968, with land clearing and construction of the physical bridge in October 1968. The New York State Department of Transportation said the project would be complete by December 1, 1970. Construction rapidly advanced through 1968 and into 1969, with the new piers being built by April 1969. Concrete was being poured in the piers, while power, gas and electric lines were being realigned for construction. With the construction running ahead of schedule, there was a belief that the project could be finished ahead of schedule. Construction of abutments was to start soon in May 1969.

The process was so rapidly advancing that despite the late delivery of steel in October 1969 for the new structure, it failed to stop the construction. The rapid pace continued into 1970, with the construction ahead of the new November 15, 1970, deadline. However, construction continued until the bridge opened on November 9, 1970, to traffic at 11 am.

The Army Corps of Engineers expanded navigation of Eighteen Mile Creek to Burt in February 1972 thanks to bridge construction. However, despite the new bridge, the history of bridges at Olcott caused problems for boaters. Despite the old bridge being torn out, the pilings of the 1878 structure were still present 2–3 feet (0.61–0.91 m) underwater.

== Suffixed routes ==
NY 18 has had seven suffixed routes using six designations; only one, NY 18F, still exists. Most of the routes were renumbered when NY 18 was truncated to Lewiston c. 1962.

- NY 18A was an alternate route of NY 18 between Collins and Hamburg. It was assigned in 1930 and mostly replaced with an extended NY 75 c. 1962.
- NY 18B was an alternate route of NY 18 through the eastern suburbs of Buffalo. It was assigned c. 1935 and mostly replaced with an extended NY 277 c. 1962.

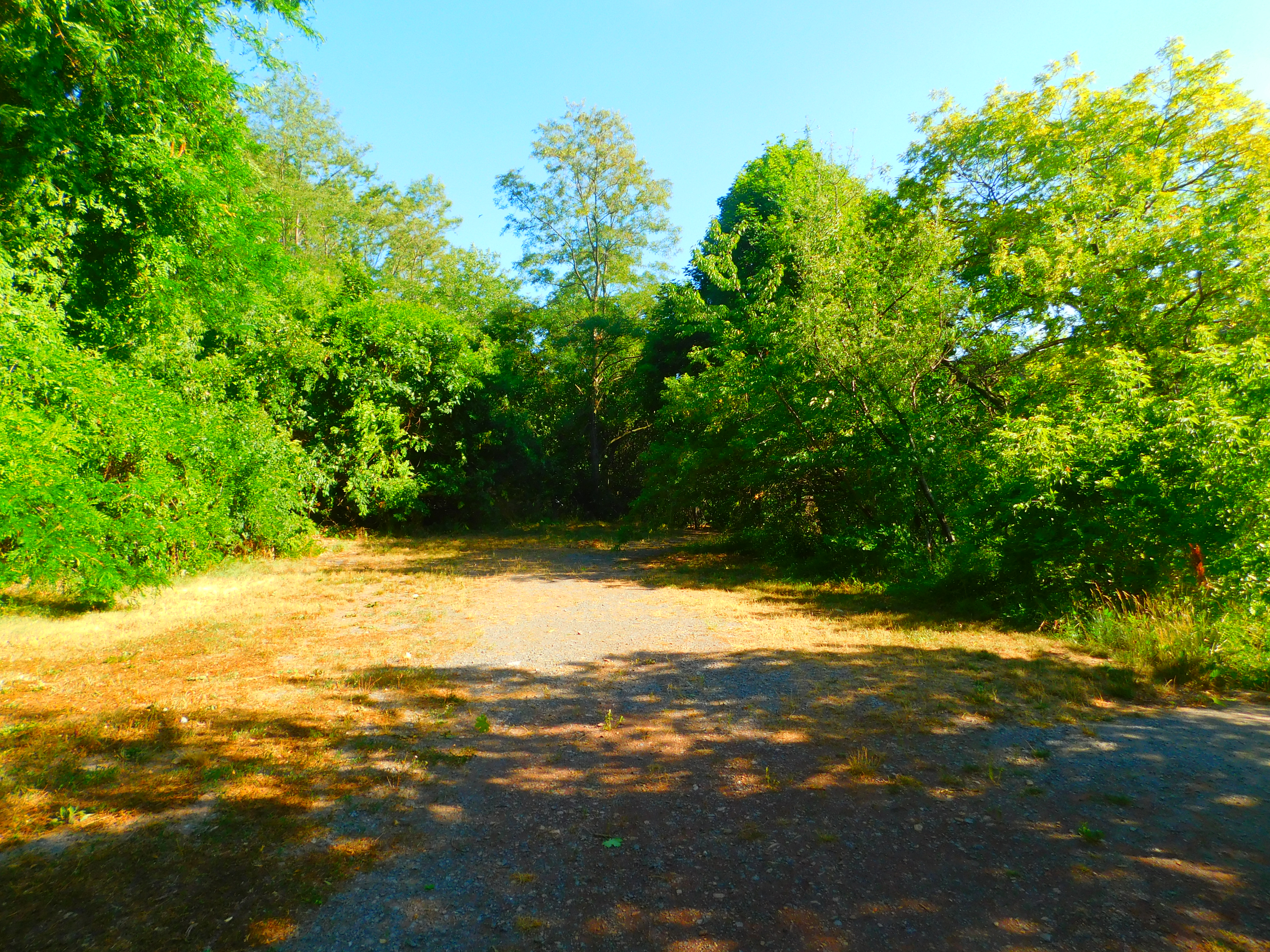
NY 18E's former alignment in the Earl W. Brydges Artpark State Park

- NY 18C was a short-lived alternate route of NY 18 through the eastern Buffalo suburbs. It was assigned c. 1932 and began at NY 18 (now US 62) at Big Tree in Hamburg and followed Big Tree Road and modern US 20 to NY 35 (now US 20 and NY 130) in Depew. The Transit Road portion of the route overlapped with NY 78. NY 18C was truncated to consist only of the Transit Road portion c. 1935 and removed entirely c. 1938 as part of US 20's realignment through western New York.
- NY 18D was a spur route linking NY 18 to the Whirlpool Rapids Bridge north of downtown Niagara Falls. It was assigned c. 1932 and renumbered to NY 182 on January 1, 1962.
- NY 18E was a short spur assigned in the early 1930s to a connector between then-NY 18 (now NY 18F) and the original Queenston–Lewiston Bridge in Lewiston. It was removed in the early 1960s when the original bridge to Queenston was replaced with the modern Lewiston–Queenston Bridge a short distance upstream.
- The NY 18F designation has been used for two distinct highways:
  - The first NY 18F was assigned c. 1934 to NY 18's original routing between Cattaraugus and Little Valley. The designation was removed c. 1938.
  - The current NY 18F (9.80 miles or 15.77 kilometres) is an alternate route of NY 18 in western Niagara County that serves the riverside villages of Lewiston and Youngstown. It was assigned in 1949.

== Major intersections ==
County	Location	mi	km	Destinations	Notes
Niagara	Village of Lewiston	0.00	0.00	NY 104 west	Western terminus
Niagara	Town of Lewiston	1.00	1.61	NY 104	
Niagara	Porter	6.99	11.25	NY 93 – Youngstown, Lockport	Hamlet of Towers Corners
Niagara	Porter	7.75	12.47	NY 18F south / Great Lakes Seaway Trail	Northern terminus of NY 18F
Niagara	Porter	8.55	13.76	Niagara Scenic Parkway south – Fort Niagara, Youngstown, Niagara Falls	Northern terminus of Niagara Scenic Parkway
Niagara	Village of Wilson	17.85	28.73	NY 425 south – Business District	Northern terminus of NY 425
Niagara	Newfane	23.71	38.16	NY 78 south	Northern terminus of NY 78; hamlet of Olcott
Niagara	Somerset	31.85	51.26	NY 148 south – Barker	Northern terminus of NY 148
Niagara–Orleans county line	Somerset–Yates town line	36.39	58.56	NY 269 south	Northern terminus of NY 269
Orleans	Yates	40.28	64.82	NY 63 south – Lyndonville	Northern terminus of NY 63
Orleans	Carlton	47.21	75.98	NY 279 south	Northern terminus of NY 279
Orleans	Carlton	48.21	77.59	To Lake Ontario State Parkway east – Lakeside Beach State Park, Rochester	Access via NY 948A
Orleans	Carlton	50.79	81.74	NY 98 north – Point Breeze	Western end of NY 98 concurrency; hamlet of The Bridges
Orleans	Carlton	51.33	82.61	NY 98 south	Eastern end of NY 98 concurrency; hamlet of Baldwin Corner
Orleans	Carlton	51.63	83.09	To NY 98 south	Access via NY 941M; hamlet of Baldwin Corner
Orleans	Kendall	59.99	96.54	NY 237	
Orleans–Monroe county line	Kendall–Hamlin town line	62.20	100.10	NY 272 north	Western end of NY 272 concurrency
Orleans–Monroe county line	Kendall–Hamlin town line	63.18	101.68	NY 272 south	Eastern end of NY 272 concurrency; hamlet of Kendall Mills
Monroe	Hamlin	67.12	108.02	NY 19	Hamlet of Hamlin
Monroe	Clarkson–Hamlin town line	70.15	112.90	NY 260	
Monroe	Hilton	73.96	119.03	NY 259 north	Western end of NY 259 concurrency
Monroe	Parma	76.05	122.39	NY 259 south	Eastern end of NY 259 concurrency; hamlet of Parma Center
Monroe	Parma–Greece town line	78.07	125.64	NY 261 north	Western end of NY 261 concurrency
Monroe	Parma–Greece town line	78.41	126.19	NY 261 south	Eastern end of NY 261 concurrency
Monroe	Town of Greece	82.61	132.95	NY 390 to Lake Ontario State Parkway	Exit 26 on NY 390; hamlet of Mount Read
Monroe	Town of Greece	83.67	134.65	Latta Road (NY 941A east)	
Monroe	Rochester	87.40	140.66	NY 104	Eastern terminus
1.000 mi = 1.609 km; 1.000 km = 0.621 mi: Concurrency terminus

== See also ==
- List of county routes in Cattaraugus County, New York
