= New York State Route 215 (disambiguation) =

New York State Route 215 is a north–south state highway in Cortland County, New York, United States, that was established in the 1980s.

New York State Route 215 may also refer to:

- New York State Route 215 (1930–1939) in Orange County
- New York State Route 215 (1940s–1970s) in Monroe County
