= Hamlin (CDP), New York =

Hamlin, New York
- Census-designated place
- Location in Monroe County and the state of New York

- Location of New York in the United States
- Coordinates: 43°18′10″N 77°55′15″W
- Country: United States
- State: New York
- County: Monroe
- Town: Hamlin

Area
  - Total: 7.68 sq mi (19.9 km^{2})
  - Land: 7.68 sq mi (19.9 km^{2})
  - Water: 0.0 sq mi (0 km^{2})
- Elevation: 312 ft (95 m)

Population (2020)
  - Total: 5,177
  - Density: 673.9/sq mi (260.2/km^{2})
- Time zone: UTC-5 (EST)
  - Summer (DST): UTC-4 (EDT)
- ZIP Codes: 14464 (Hamlin); 14468 (Hilton)
- Area code: 585
- FIPS code: 36-31786

Hamlin is an unincorporated community and census-designated place (CDP) within the town of Hamlin, Monroe County, New York, United States. The population was 5,177 at the 2020 census, out of 8,725 in the entire town of Hamlin.

== Geography ==
Hamlin CDP is in northwestern Monroe County, in the southern part of the town of Hamlin. It is bordered to the south by the town of Clarkson. New York State Route 19 (Lake Road) passes through the center of the CDP, leading north 3.5 miles (5.6 km) to its terminus at the Lake Ontario State Parkway and south 6 miles (10 km) to Brockport. State Route 18 passes through the southern part of the CDP, leading east 6 miles (10 km) to Hilton and west 43 miles (69 km) to Olcott.

According to the U.S. Census Bureau, the Hamlin CDP has an area of 7.7 square miles (19.9 km^{2}), all land.

== Demographics ==
Historical population
Census	Pop.	Note	%±
2010	5,521		—
2020	5,177		−6.2%
U.S. Decennial Census
