= Kendall, New York =

- Town
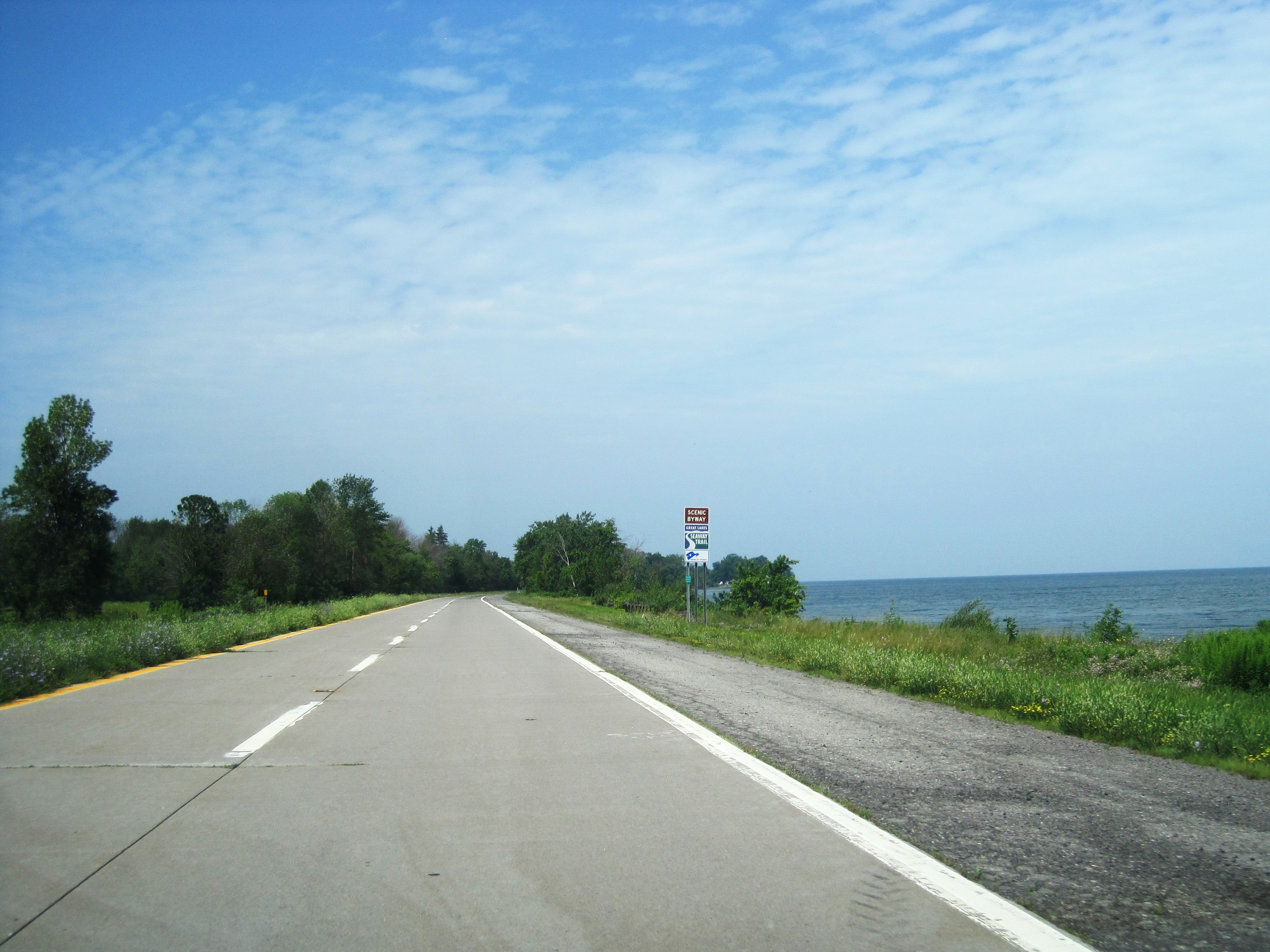
- View of Lake Ontario from the Lake Ontario State Parkway in Kendall

- Location in Orleans County and the state of New York.

- Location of New York in the United States
- Coordinates: 43°20′9″N 78°2′55″W
- Country: United States
- State: New York
- County: Orleans

Area
  - Total: 32.92 sq mi (85.26 km^{2})
  - Land: 32.86 sq mi (85.11 km^{2})
  - Water: 0.062 sq mi (0.16 km^{2})
- Elevation: 330 ft (100 m)

Population (2010)
  - Total: 2,724
  - Estimate (2016): 2,638
  - Density: 80/sq mi (31/km^{2})
- Time zone: UTC-5 (Eastern (EST))
  - Summer (DST): UTC-4 (EDT)
- ZIP code: 14476/14508
- Area code: 585
- FIPS code: 36-39188
- GNIS feature ID: 0979114
- Website: www.townofkendall.com

Kendall is a town in Orleans County, just west of the town of Hamlin in Monroe County, in New York State, United States. The population of Kendall was 2,724 at the 2010 census. The Town of Kendall is in the northeast corner of Orleans County and is northwest of Rochester.

== History ==
The town was part of the Connecticut Tract, also called the 100,000 Acre Tract.

The first settlers arrived circa 1812. The Erie Canal opened in 1825, making a ready market for wheat and lumber. It also made the way easier for more settlement. The first Norwegian immigrant community in the United States was begun at the Kendall Settlement in 1825. They settled in a body along the lakeshore in the northeast part of town. Norwegian-American pioneer leader Cleng Peerson subsequently founded a settlement in the Fox River Valley of Illinois during 1834, near the community of Norway, Illinois.

The Town of Kendall was incorporated from the Town of Murray. On April 7, 1837, about half of the Town of Murray became the new Town of Kendall. It was formerly called "North Murray" and was settled slowly due to swampy terrain, being called the "Black North", due to the bogs and forests. The town was named after Amos Kendall, the U.S. Postmaster General under Presidents Andrew Jackson and Martin Van Buren.

== Geography ==
According to the United States Census Bureau, the town has a total area of 33.0 square miles (85 km^{2}), of which 32.9 square miles (85 km^{2}) is land and 0.1 square miles (0.26 km^{2}) (0.24%) is water.

Kendall borders Lake Ontario on its north. The eastern boundary, marked by New York State Route 272, is the on Monroe County, New York, (Town of Hamlin).

The Lake Ontario State Parkway parallels the shore of Lake Ontario. North-south highway New York State Route 237 (Kendall Highway) intersects east-west highway New York State Route 18 (Roosevelt Highway) south of Kendall village.

== Demographics ==
Historical population
Census	Pop.	Note	%±
1840	1,692		—
1850	2,289		35.3%
1860	1,920		−16.1%
1870	1,744		−9.2%
1880	1,893		8.5%
1890	1,775		−6.2%
1900	1,616		−9.0%
1910	1,585		−1.9%
1920	1,275		−19.6%
1930	1,311		2.8%
1940	1,341		2.3%
1950	1,343		0.1%
1960	1,680		25.1%
1970	2,183		29.9%
1980	2,388		9.4%
1990	2,769		16.0%
2000	2,838		2.5%
2010	2,724		−4.0%
2016 (est.)	2,638		−3.2%
U.S. Decennial Census

As of the census of 2000, there were 2,838 people, 979 households, and 794 families residing in the town. The population density was 86.3 inhabitants per square mile (33.3/km^{2}). There were 1,103 housing units at an average density of 33.5 per square mile (12.9/km^{2}). The racial makeup of the town was 97.04% White, 0.63% African American, 0.56% Native American, 0.18% Asian, 0.56% from other races, and 1.02% from two or more races. Hispanic or Latino of any race were 1.20% of the population.

There were 979 households, out of which 37.5% had children under the age of 18 living with them, 68.1% were married couples living together, 8.2% had a female householder with no husband present, and 18.8% were non-families. 14.6% of all households were made up of individuals, and 5.6% had someone living alone who was 65 years of age or older. The average household size was 2.90 and the average family size was 3.18.

In the town, the population was spread out, with 28.4% under the age of 18, 6.8% from 18 to 24, 27.9% from 25 to 44, 25.9% from 45 to 64, and 10.9% who were 65 years of age or older. The median age was 38 years. For every 100 females, there were 105.7 males. For every 100 females age 18 and over, there were 101.7 males.

The median income for a household in the town was $49,821, and the median income for a family was $50,952. Males had a median income of $36,959 versus $24,309 for females. The per capita income for the town was $20,373. About 5.2% of families and 5.0% of the population were below the poverty line, including 6.6% of those under age 18 and 3.9% of those age 65 or over.

== Communities and locations in Kendall ==
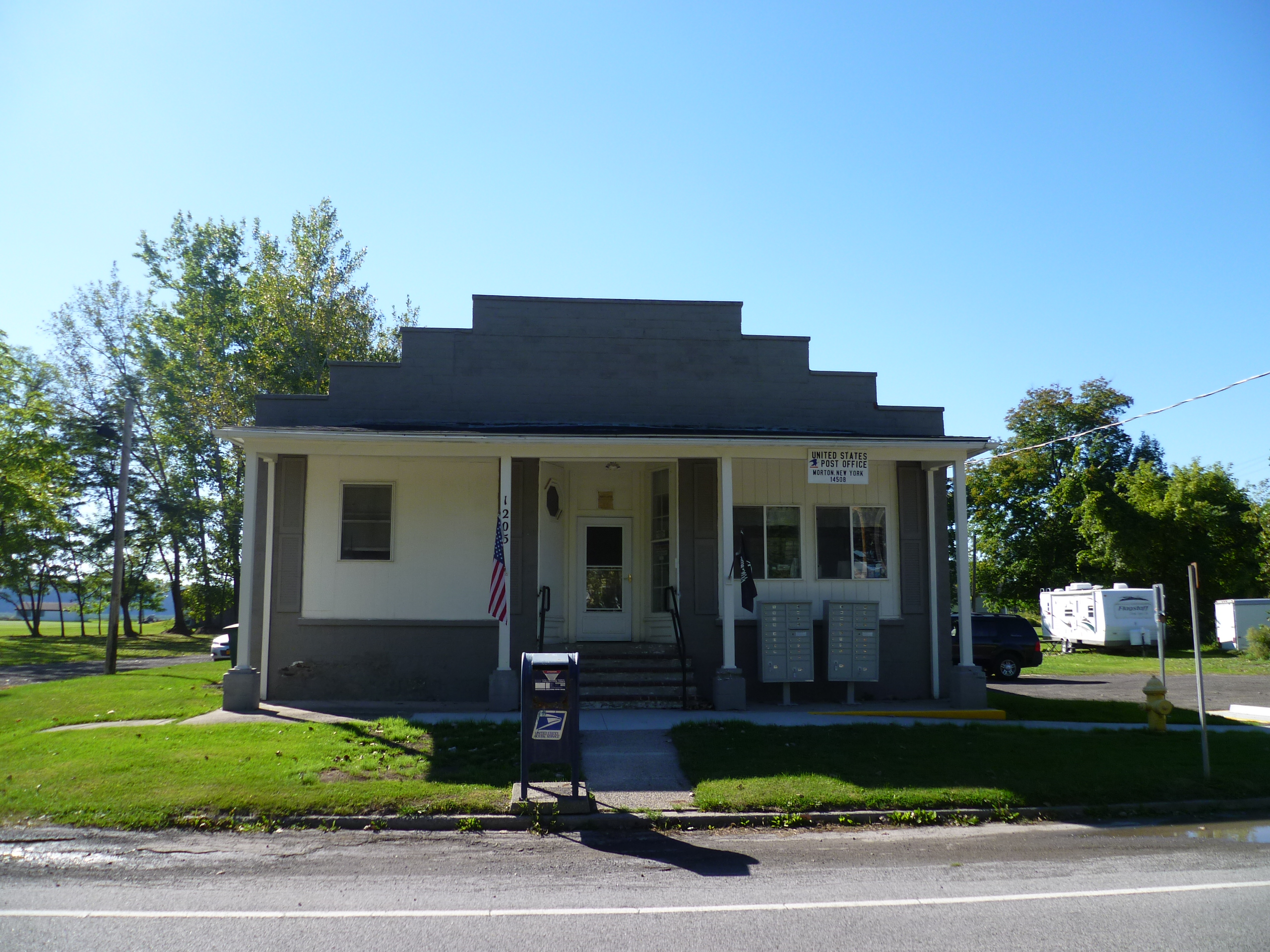
The post office for Morton, NY, which is located on County Line Road.

- Kendall - A hamlet on NY-237 and the location of the town government.
- Kendall Mills – A location on the eastern town line and NY-272, formerly called "Webster Mills."
- Lomond Shore – A Lake Ontario shore hamlet next to the Lake Ontario Shore Parkway.
- Morton – A hamlet, formerly "East Kendall" and "Clarks Corners", located on the border of Monroe County. It has its own post office located on NY-272 (County Line Road), the zip code being 14508.
- Troutburg – A hamlet by Lake Ontario on the east town line. It was once a lake port.
- West Kendall – A hamlet northwest of Kendall.
