= New York State Route 269 =

State highway in western New York, US

New York State Route 269
- County Line Road
- Map of western New York with NY 269 highlighted in red

Route information
- Maintained by NYSDOT
- Length: 6.36 mi (10.24 km)
- Existed: 1930–present

Major junctions
- South end: NY 104 on Hartland–Ridgeway town line
- North end: NY 18 on Somerset–Yates town line

Location
- Country: United States
- State: New York
- Counties: Niagara, Orleans

Highway system
- New York Highways; Interstate; US; State; Reference; Parkways
← NY 268	→ NY 270

New York State Route 269 (NY 269) is a north–south state highway located in western New York in the United States. The highway runs for 6.36 miles (10.24 km) along the Niagara–Orleans county line and is named County Line Road. The southern terminus of NY 269 is at an intersection with NY 104 in the hamlet of Jeddo. Its northern terminus is at a junction with NY 18 in the hamlet of County Line. NY 269 is one of only two state highways in New York that are located wholly along a county boundary; the other is NY 272 on the other side of Orleans County. The route was assigned as part of the 1930 renumbering of state highways in New York and has not been altered since.

== Route description ==
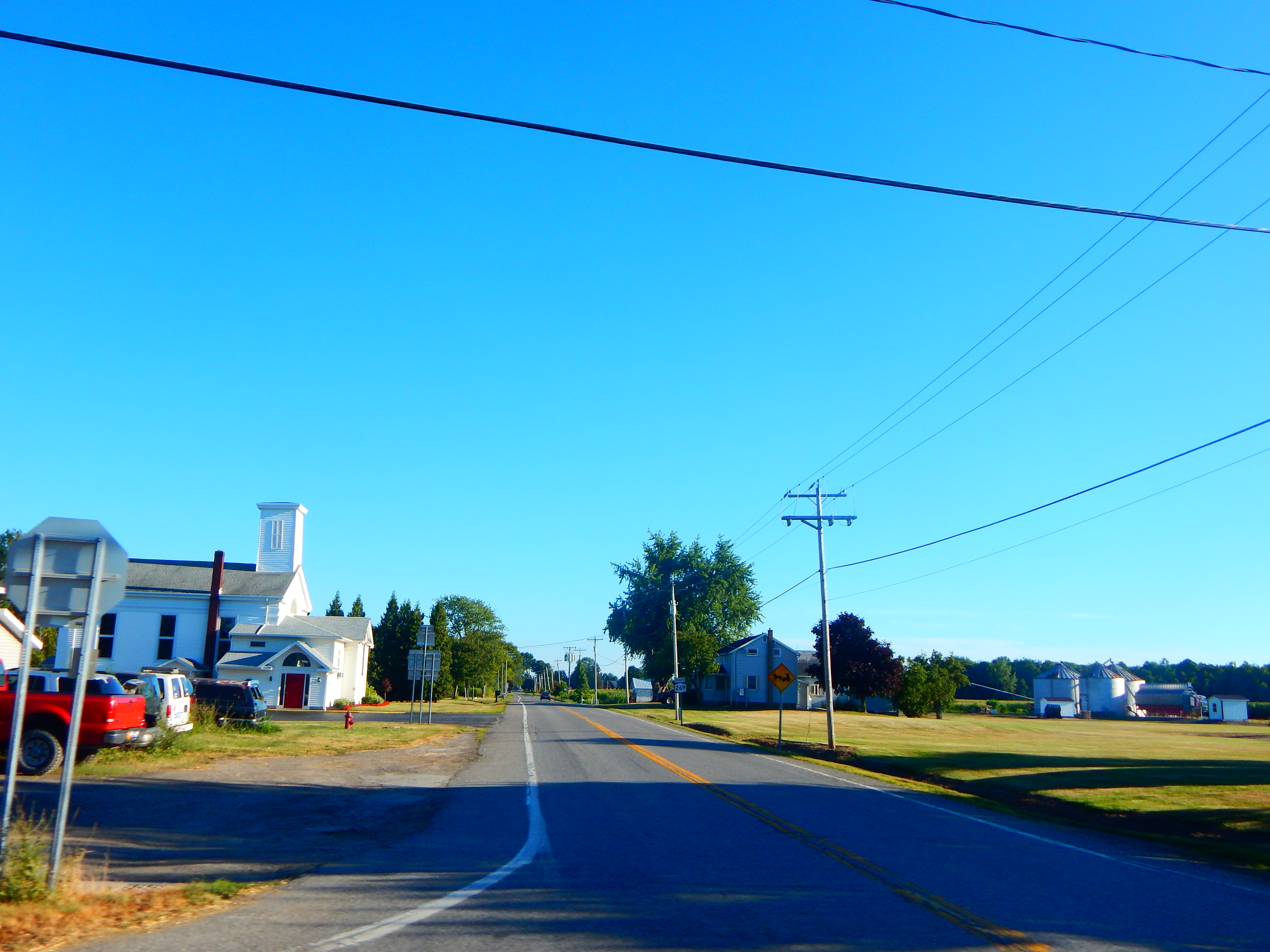
NY 269 southbound from NY 18 in Somerset and Yates

NY 269 begins at an intersection with NY 104 (Ridge Road) in the hamlet of Jeddo, located on the boundary between the towns of Hartland, Niagara County, and Ridgeway, Orleans County. The highway progresses northward along the two-lane County Line Road, running along the eastern boundary of Niagara County and the western edge of Orleans County. It passes through mostly undeveloped areas dominated by forests and farmlands on its way to the small hamlet of North Ridgeway, located 2 miles (3.2 km) north of Jeddo at the junction of NY 269 and Mill Road. Not far to the north of the hamlet is Town Line Road, which serves as the divider between the towns of Hartland and Somerset.

North of Town Line Road, NY 269 crosses into the towns of Somerset and Yates, where it initially continues across more rural terrain. Eventually, the route reaches the hamlet of County Line, a small but commercialized community located in an otherwise open and undeveloped area. NY 269 heads into the center of the community, where the NY 269 designation terminates at an intersection with NY 18 (Lake Road). NY 269 is one of only two state highways in New York that are located wholly along a county boundary. Incidentally, the other—NY 272—follows the northern half of Orleans County's eastern boundary, which it shares with Monroe County.

== History ==
The portion of the Niagara–Orleans county line road between Ridge Road and the hamlet of County Line was taken over by the state of New York c. 1930. In the 1930 renumbering of state highways in New York, several of the routes assigned during the 1920s were renumbered or modified. At the same time, hundreds of state-maintained highways that did not yet have a route number were assigned one. One of these was the state-maintained portion of the Niagara–Orleans county line road, which was designated as NY 269. The route has not been substantially altered since that time.

== Major intersections ==
The entire route is located on the Niagara–Orleans county line.

Location	mi	km	Destinations	Notes
Hartland–Ridgeway town line	0.00	0.00	NY 104 (Ridge Road)	Southern terminus; hamlet of Jeddo
Somerset–Yates town line	6.36	10.24	NY 18 (Lake Road)	Northern terminus; hamlet of County Line
1.000 mi = 1.609 km; 1.000 km = 0.621 mi
