= North Star School District No. 11 =

- U.S. National Register of Historic Places
- Location within New York Location within the United States
- Location: 864 Walker Lake Ontario Rd., Hamlin, New York
- Coordinates: 43°19′08″N 77°51′36″W
- Area: Less than 1 acre (0.40 ha)
- Built: 1844, 1880, 1912, 1952
- Architectural style: Greek Revival
- NRHP reference No.: 14000579
- Added to NRHP: September 10, 2014

North Star School District No. 11, also known as the North Star History Center, is a historic one-room school building located at Hamlin, Monroe County, New York. It was built in 1844, and is a one-story, Greek Revival style brick building. It rests on a Medina sandstone foundation and has a front gable roof with a prominent cornice and topped by a bell tower. It has a front porch added in 1912 and rear frame additions added about 1952. Also on the property are two contributing wooden privies and a coal house (c. 1880). The school closed in 1952, and subsequently used as a community center and local history museum since 1987.

It was listed on the National Register of Historic Places in 2014.
