= Lakeside Beach State Park =

Park in Carlton, New York, USA

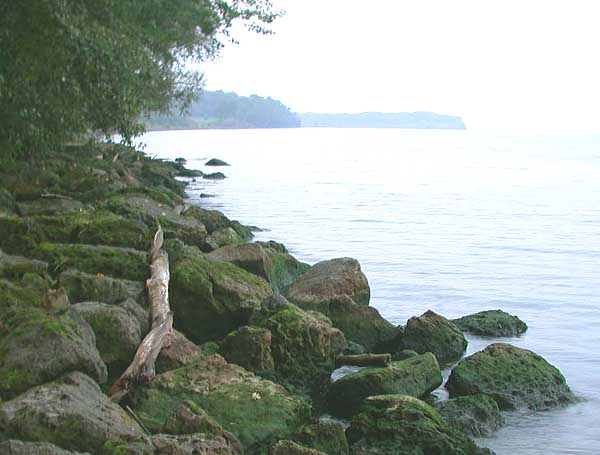
- View of Lake Ontario along the shore of Lakeside Beach State Park

- Location within New York
- Type: State park
- Location: Route 18; Waterport, New York
- Coordinates: 43°22′01″N 78°14′31″W
- Area: 744 acres (3.01 km^{2})
- Operator: New York State Office of Parks, Recreation and Historic Preservation
- Visitors: 77,326 (in 2014)
- Open: All year
- Camp sites: 274
- Website: Lakeside Beach State Park

Lakeside Beach State Park is a 744-acre (3.01 km^{2}) state park located on the shore of Lake Ontario in the Town of Carlton, Orleans County, New York.

== Park description ==
The park includes 274 campsites, as well as a campground store. Despite its name, swimming is not allowed at the park. The park installed the 18-hole "Shore Winds Disc Golf Course" in 2009, which starts near the back of the park and includes several holes playing along the Lake Ontario shoreline.

The park may be accessed from Route 18. The park is also the western terminus of the Lake Ontario State Parkway.

== See also ==
- List of New York state parks
