= Hamlin Beach State Park =

Park in Hamlin, New York, USA

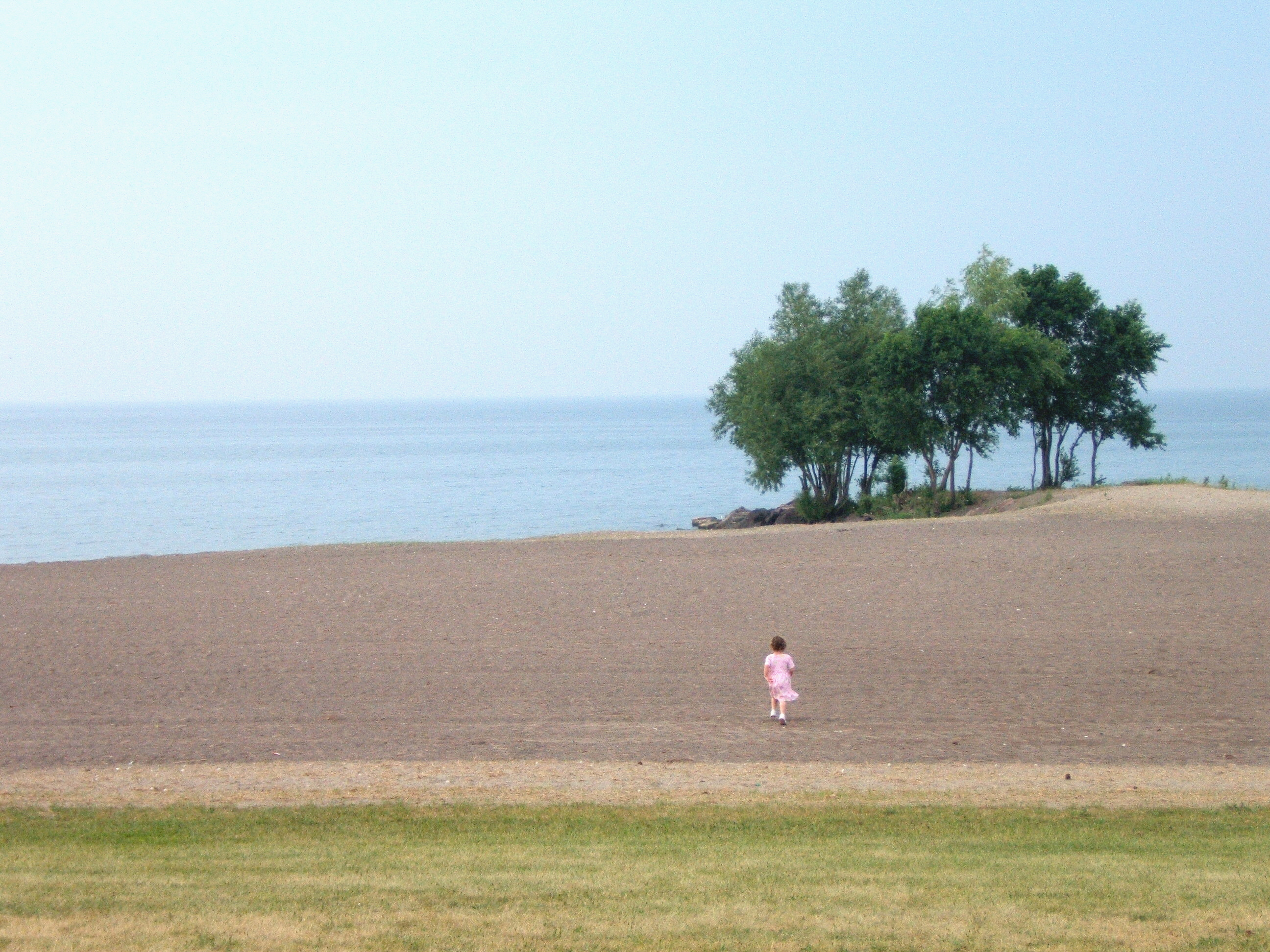
- View of the beach at Hamlin Beach State Park.

- Location within New York
- Type: State park
- Location: 1 Hamlin Beach Blvd. West; Hamlin, New York
- Nearest city: Hamlin, New York
- Coordinates: 43°21′40″N 77°57′11″W
- Area: 1,287 acres (5.21 km^{2})
- Created: 1938
- Operator: New York State Office of Parks, Recreation and Historic Preservation
- Visitors: 278,098 (in 2014)
- Open: All year
- Website: Hamlin Beach State Park

Hamlin Beach State Park is a 1,287-acre (5.21 km^{2}) state park located on the shore of Lake Ontario in the Town of Hamlin in Monroe County, New York, United States. The Lake Ontario State Parkway passes through the park.

== History ==
Hamlin Beach first became a park in 1929, after Monroe County purchased a total of 597 acres (2.42 km^{2}) for $169,373. The park, initially known as Northwest Beach Park, consisted of the former Charles Wolf property and surrounding farmland. The park's name was changed to Hamlin Beach Park in 1930.

While under county ownership, a Civilian Conservation Corps camp was constructed at the park, and workers lodged at the camp labored to improve the park's facilities between 1935 and 1941. During World War II, the site was used as a Prisoner of War camp, housing German POWs between 1944 and 1946. The camp served as a labor hub, providing workers to local farms and food processing plants in the Hamlin area. The camp was dismantled when the war was over.

The site was transferred to New York State's ownership in 1938, and was renamed Hamlin Beach State Park. After World War II, the Lake Ontario State Parkway was extended through the park, increasing accessibility. The parking lot was expanded to handle the increase in visitors, and the campgrounds were built.

Evidence of the Civilian Conservation Corps' park improvements can be seen, including stone-work on headwalls, barriers and pavilions. Their work on the park was responsible for six buildings and the reclamation of swampland on the eastern end.

During the 1970s, the park, specifically the beach, was suffering from large amounts of erosion from storms. State and Federal funding was provided and the beaches were rebuilt and jetties were added to help prevent further damage. Development on the Yanty Creek Nature trail began as well. It is now a mile-long trail with educational markers along the way.

In 2008, volunteers from the Friends of Hamlin Beach began clearing brush from the grounds of the former CCC/POW camp which is located off of Moscow Road in Hamlin. An interpretive trail explaining the history of the camp was officially opened in 2014.

== Park description ==
Hamlin Beach State Park offers a beach, picnic tables with pavilions, a playground, recreation programs, a nature trail, surfing, hiking and biking, fishing, a campground with 264 tent and trailer sites, ice skating, cross-country skiing, snowmobiling, a boat launch, and a food concession.

The park is open year-round, and swimming is permitted from the middle of June through Labor Day. Campsites are available from early May through Columbus day. The beach occasionally closes due to pollution.

Three parking lots, with the capacity to hold 2,500 vehicles, are available along the main road through the park. A $9 parking fee is assessed for vehicles (Deducted to $3 for the 2019 season). The park is handicap accessible. Pets are permitted on leashes of six feet (1.8 m) or less, and must have proof of inoculation before entering the camping area. No animals are allowed on the beach.

Boats may be launched from either a designated hand launch north of the Area 1 parking lot or from a car-top launch on the eastern end of the beach near the Yantee Creek parking area.

In 2016, it was announced that Governor Cuomo was giving Hamlin Beach State Park $2.25 Million for a park enhancement program. With this money, the old 1939 sandstone bathhouse, built by members of the Civilian Conservation Corps, underwent heavy remodeling. They were gutted, and improved. Also, new bathrooms were installed in loops A & B in the campground area.

=== Trails ===
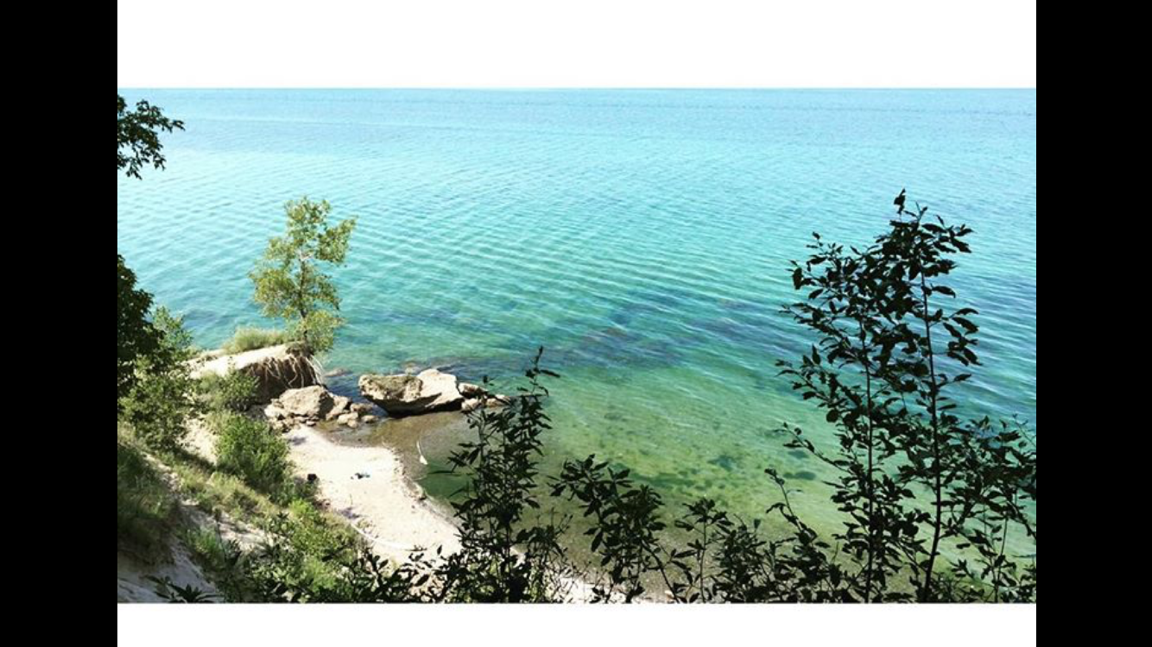
Devil's Nose at Hamlin Beach State Park

The Yanty Creek Nature Trail is on the eastern end of the park and the trailhead is accessible by the park road. There is parking for about 10 cars at the trailhead. The trail is stone or mulch and winds around in a loop. Informational placards are provided along the way. The Shoreline Trail is a paved trail that runs along the lake east to west, passing by the beaches. There are several other small trails within the campgrounds and other wooded areas.

The Devil's Nose is a sand bluff on the westernmost end of the park. The tree-covered bluff is part of a larger sand and clay shoal that extends approximately one mile (1.6 km) under the lake. The above-water section of the Nose used to be much larger, but rising lake levels and erosion has drastically reduced the size. In 2018, work began to re-open the trails to the public. Mulch was laid down, fences placed, and the trails were re-opened in 2019 for public access. Stay back signs posted frequently because of nearly 80 foot drop.

Devil's Nose is the site of many shipwrecks, including the York in December 1799; the C. Reeve on November 22, 1862; the Almira on June 8, 1863; and the John Weeden on October 27, 1869.

== See also ==
- List of New York state parks
