= Hamlin, New York =

- Town
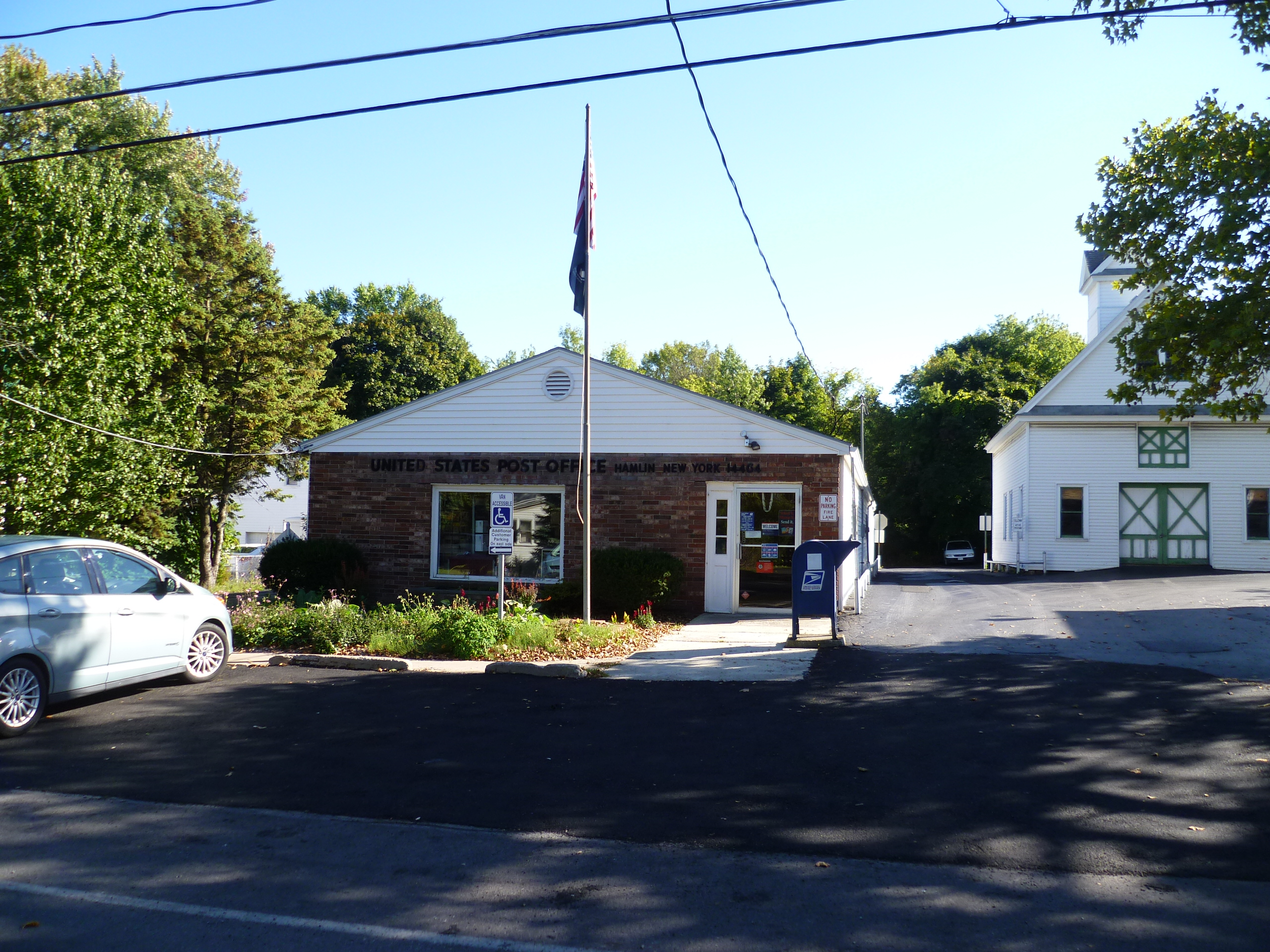
- The post office for Hamlin, located on Railroad Avenue

- Location in Monroe County and the state of New York

- Location of New York in the United States
- Coordinates: 43°18′11″N 77°55′16″W
- Country: United States
- State: New York
- County: Monroe
- Established: October 11, 1852; 173 years ago (as the town of Union)
- Renamed: February 28, 1861; 165 years ago (as Hamlin)

Government
  - Town supervisor: Eric Peters (R) Town council: Dave Rose (R); Phil Hurlbutt (R); Jason Baxter (R); Jennifer Voelkl (R)

Area
  - Total: 44.59 sq mi (115.5 km^{2})
  - Land: 43.25 sq mi (112.0 km^{2})
  - Water: 1.34 sq mi (3.5 km^{2})
- Elevation: 345 ft (105 m)

Population (2020)
  - Total: 8,725
  - Density: 201.7/sq mi (77.9/km^{2})
- Time zone: UTC-5 (EST)
  - Summer (DST): UTC-4 (EDT)
- ZIP Codes: 14464 (Hamlin); 14468 (Hilton); 14420 (Brockport); 14470 (Holley); 14476 (Kendall)
- Area code: 585
- FIPS code: 36-055-31797
- Website: www.hamlinny.org

Hamlin is a town in Monroe County, New York, United States. The population was 8,725 at the 2020 census, down from 9,045 in 2010. The town is in the northwestern part of the county and is the second-largest town in area in the county.

== History ==
The town of Hamlin was created as the town of Union, and was renamed in 1861 as Hamlin in honor of Abraham Lincoln's first vice president, Hannibal Hamlin.

Hamlin was initially a part of the town of Northampton. The town of Murray was split from Northampton in 1807, and was split again into Union and Clarkson on December 14, 1852.

The North Star School District No. 11 was listed on the National Register of Historic Places in 2014.

== Geography ==
According to the U.S. Census Bureau, the town has a total area of 44.59 square miles (115.5 km^{2}), of which 43.25 square miles (112.0 km^{2}) are land and 1.34 square miles (3.5 km^{2}), or 3.01%, are water. The northern boundary of the town is Lake Ontario, and the western town line is the border of Orleans County, marked by New York State Route 272 (Monroe Orleans County Line Rd). The south town line borders the town of Clarkson, marked by Clarkson Hamlin Town Line Road that intersects Lake Road (New York State Route 19) south of Hamlin village. The eastern town line borders the town of Parma, marked by Hamlin-Parma Townline Road.

The Lake Ontario State Parkway passes across the north part of the town. The city of Rochester is 23 miles (37 km) to the southeast, and the village of Brockport is 6 miles (10 km) to the south.

== Demographics ==
Historical population
Census	Pop.	Note	%±
1860	2,460		—
1870	2,304		−6.3%
1880	2,556		10.9%
1890	2,338		−8.5%
1900	2,183		−6.6%
1910	2,184		0.0%
1920	1,999		−8.5%
1930	2,079		4.0%
1940	2,080		0.0%
1950	2,321		11.6%
1960	2,755		18.7%
1970	4,167		51.3%
1980	7,675		84.2%
1990	9,203		19.9%
2000	9,355		1.7%
2010	9,045		−3.3%
2020	8,725		−3.5%
U.S. Decennial Census

As of the census of 2000, there were 9,355 people, 3,255 households, and 2,532 families residing in the town. The population density was 215.5 inhabitants per square mile (83.2/km^{2}). There were 3,503 housing units at an average density of 80.7 per square mile (31.2/km^{2}). The racial makeup of the town was 96.78% White, 1.09% African American, 0.35% Native American, 0.32% Asian, 0.01% Pacific Islander, 0.68% from other races, and 0.76% from two or more races. Hispanic or Latino of any race were 1.60% of the population.

There was a myth that Hamlin's name was derived from that of the German city of Hamelin, this due to the fact that many residents in or near the hamlet of Hamlin were descended from German immigrants who had arrived during the late 1800s and settled in that part of the town. This had coincided with the town's renaming from Union in 1861.

There were 3,255 households, out of which 43.4% had children under the age of 18 living with them, 63.7% were married couples living together, 9.6% had a female householder with no husband present, and 22.2% were non-families. 17.4% of all households were made up of individuals, and 5.9% had someone living alone who was 65 years of age or older. The average household size was 2.86 and the average family size was 3.24.

In the town, the population was spread out, with 30.8% under the age of 18, 8.1% from 18 to 24, 31.5% from 25 to 44, 23.0% from 45 to 64, and 6.5% who were 65 years of age or older. The median age was 34 years. For every 100 females, there were 98.5 males. For every 100 females age 18 and over, there were 97.0 males.

The median income for a household in the town was $49,987, and the median income for a family was $55,020. Males had a median income of $39,722 versus $24,698 for females. The per capita income for the town was $18,978. About 4.7% of families and 6.0% of the population were below the poverty line, including 6.4% of those under age 18 and 1.7% of those age 65 or over.

== Government ==
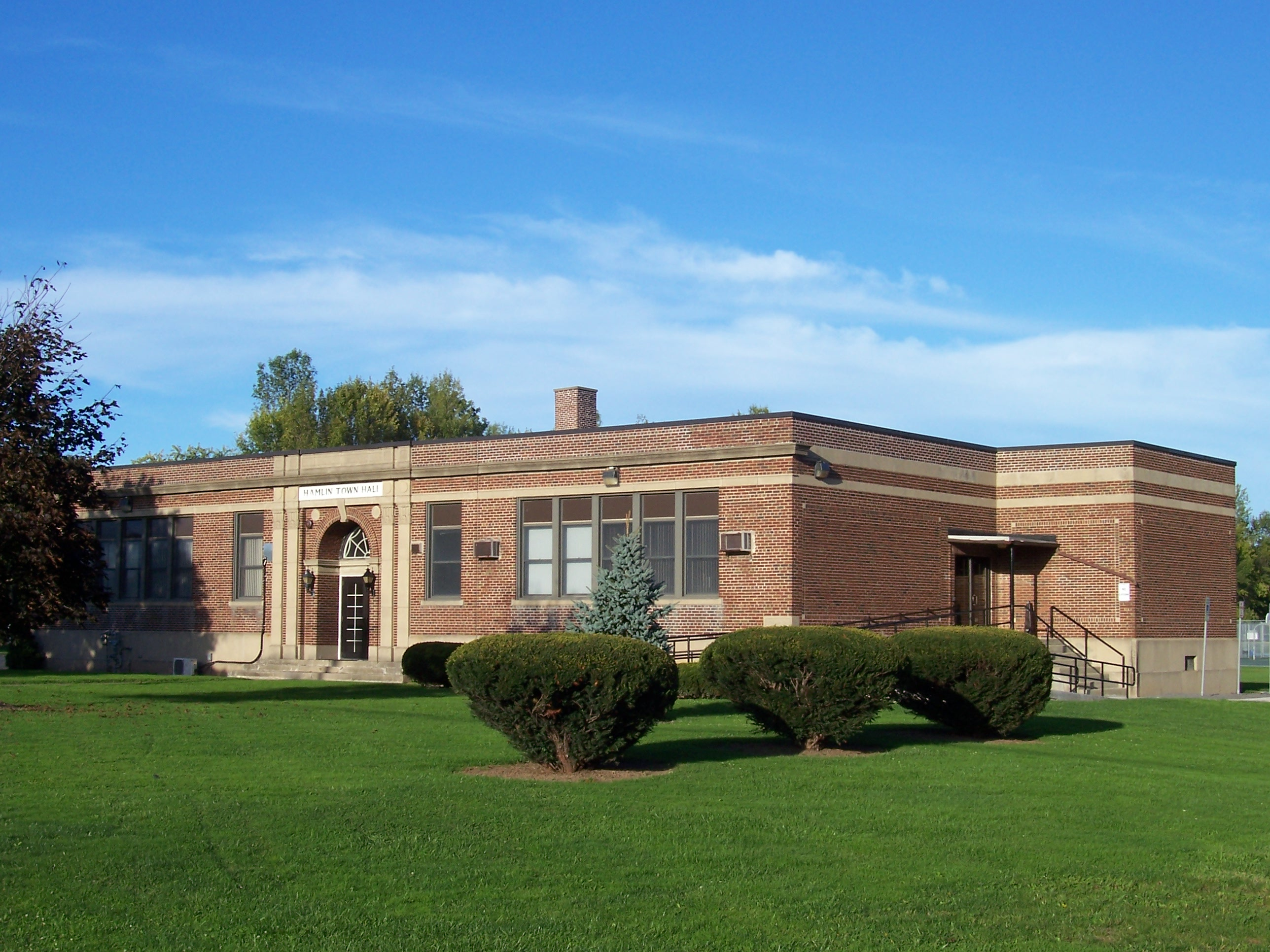
Hamlin town hall

The town is governed by an elected town board, consisting of the town supervisor and four council members. Support boards include:

- Planning board
- Zoning board of appeals
- Conservation board

== Communities and locations in the town of Hamlin ==
- Benedict Beach – A beachside hamlet on Lake Ontario.
- Bluff Beach – A location in the northwest part of the town near Troutburg.
- Brockport Yacht Club-- Located on the South Shore of Lake Ontario, near the mouth of Sandy Creek, it is primarily a sailing club.
- Hamlin – the hamlet (and census-designated place) within the town of Hamlin on Route 19.
- Hamlin Beach State Park – A state park on the shore of Lake Ontario in the northwest part of the town.
- Hamlin Recreation Area – A park south of Hamlin village.
- Huntington Park – A location south of Hamlin village and near the south town line.
- Kendall Mills – A hamlet on the west town line.
- Morton – A hamlet at the west town line on Route 272.
- North Hamlin – A hamlet, formerly "Thomasville," south of the Lake Ontario State Parkway.
- Onteo Beach – A beachside hamlet on Lake Ontario.
- Sandy Harbor Beach – A beachside hamlet on Lake Ontario.
- Shore Acres – A beachside hamlet on Lake Ontario.
- Troutburg – A beachside hamlet by Lake Ontario and the Lake Ontario State Parkway in the northwest corner of the town. It is at the west end of Hamlin Beach State Park.
- Walker – A hamlet in the southeast part of the town on Route 260.
