= Clifton Park Center =

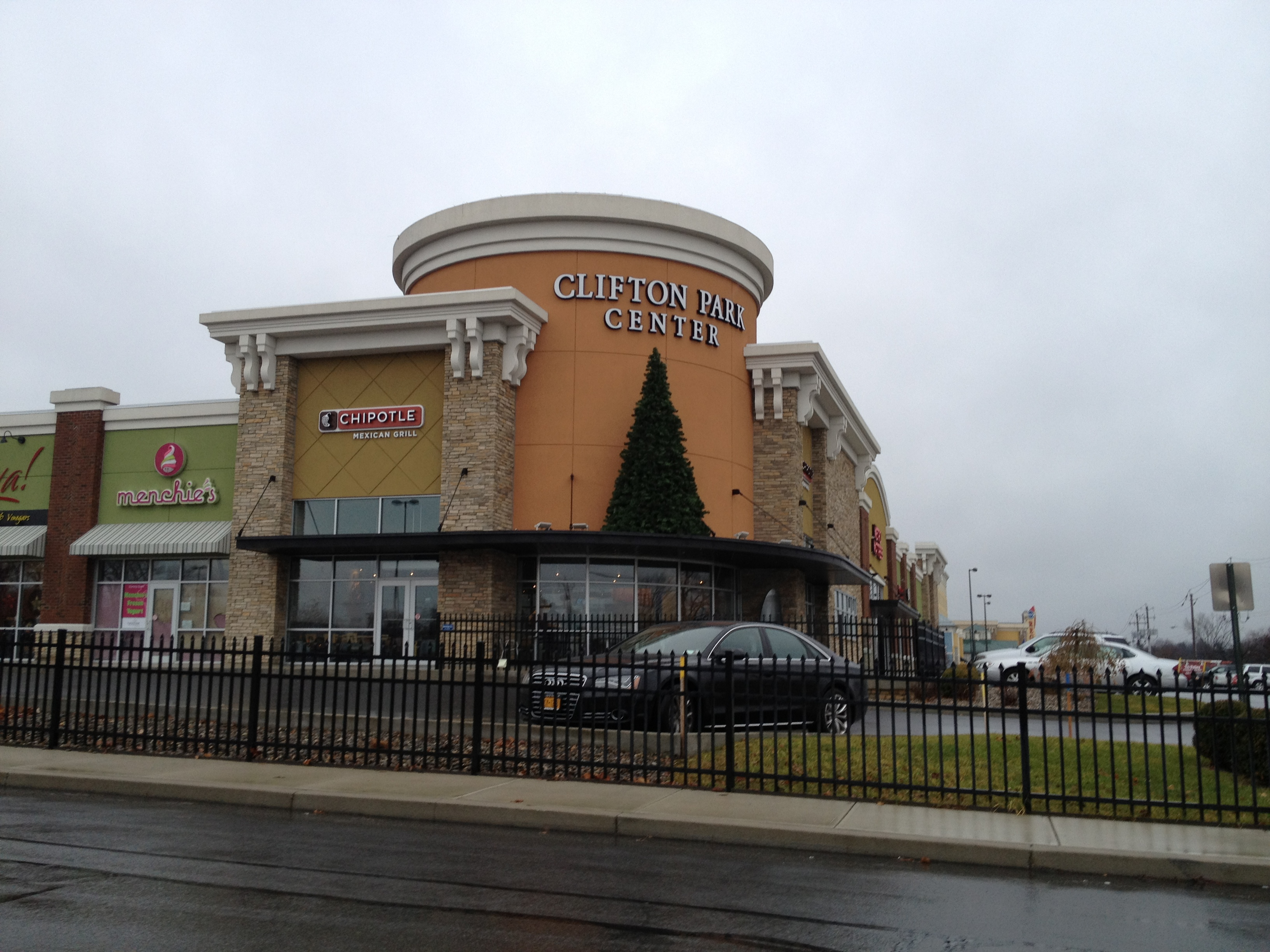
- Exterior view of Clifton Park Center, December 2012
- Location: Clifton Park, New York
- Coordinates: 42°51′30″N 73°46′42″W
- Opened: 1976
- Developer: Myron Hunt
- Manager: CPC Development
- Owner: CPC Development
- Num. of stores: 72
- Num. of anchor tenants: 3
- Floors: 1 (main mall), Boscov's has 2 floors, and a five-story Hilton Garden Inn
- Website: shopcpc.com

Clifton Park Center, formerly known as the Clifton Country Mall, is a large shopping center, located in Clifton Park, New York. As of 2022, the mall currently maintains the traditional chain anchors Boscov's, JCPenney, and a Marshalls and HomeGoods combo. The mall features 72 stores and a food court.

== History ==
The mall opened in 1976 with JC Penney, The Carl Company and A&P as the mall's three anchor stores. In 1984, the mall was expanded, bringing in Caldor as a fourth anchor. This expansion also gave the mall a food court and movie theater. In 1989, A&P closed and its empty space was converted into a Price Chopper and a CVS, then into Steinbach in 1991. Also in 1991, The Carl Company closed and its empty space was converted into the mall's present day Marshalls Megastore/HomeGoods.

In 2000, the mall was given a new white marble exterior (replacing its original pink exterior) and its name was changed from Clifton Country Mall to Clifton Park Center. After Steinbach and Caldor closed in 1999, the mall was only left with two anchor stores. After Boscov's opened its first Capital District store at Colonie Center, Clifton Park town officials convinced Boscov's to open a second Capital District store at Clifton Park Center, rather than at Wilton Mall. The former Caldor was demolished and in its place, a two story Boscov's was constructed, which opened in November 2000, becoming the mall's third current anchor store.

In April 2006, the mall was purchased by DCG Development, a Clifton Park based development firm. The new developers demolished the mall's northern section (everything north of Marshalls), converting the area into a lifestyle section, consisting of outdoor storefronts, each with individual entrances. The demolitions left both JC Penney and the former Steinbach as stand-alone buildings, separated from the rest of the mall. In August 2009, the former Steinbach was demolished and converted into a stand-alone lifestyle building, consisting of outdoor storefronts with individual entrances. In 2011, the mall's original movie theater and its surrounding area was demolished and replaced with a new “state of the art” 10 screen Regal Cinema and a five story Hilton Garden Inn. In March 2023, DCG Development sold the mall to its current owner, CPC Development.
