= Capital District (New York) =

Capital District Albany metropolitan area
- Region
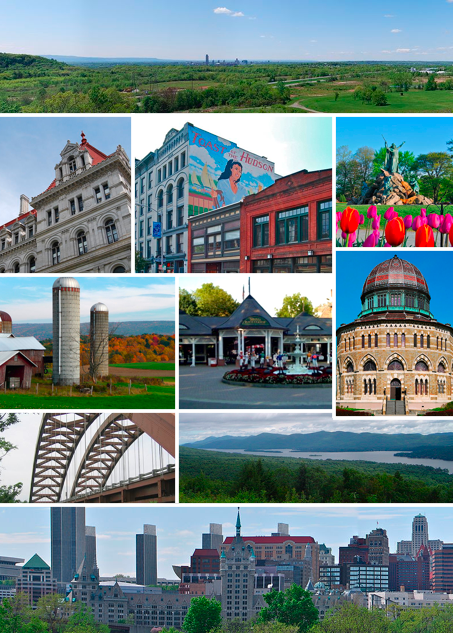
Interactive Map of Albany–Schenectady, NY CSA
City of Albany
Albany–Schenectady–Troy MSA
Glens Falls MSA
Hudson µSA
Gloversville µSA
Amsterdam µSA
- Country: United States
- State: New York
- Cities: Albany, Amsterdam, Ballston Spa, Catskill, Cohoes, Glens Falls, Gloversville, Hudson, Johnstown, Mechanicville, Menands, Rensselaer, Saratoga Springs, Schenectady, South Glens Falls, Troy, Waterford, Watervliet
- Counties: Albany, Columbia, Fulton, Greene, Montgomery, Rensselaer, Saratoga, Schenectady, Schoharie, Warren, Washington

Area
  - Total: 7,228 sq mi (18,720 km^{2})

Population (2020)
  - Total: 899,262 (MSA); 1,190,727 (CSA)
  - Density: 124.4/sq mi (48.04/km^{2})

GDP
  - Total: $80.303 billion (2022)
- Time zone: UTC−5 (EST)
  - Summer (DST): UTC−4 (EDT)
- Area code: 518, 838
- Website: Capital District Regional Planning Commission; Capital District Transportation Committee

The Capital District, also known as the Capital Region, is the metropolitan area surrounding Albany, the capital of the U.S. state of New York. With an estimated 915,835 residents as of the 2025 US Census estimate, the Capital District is the 4th largest metropolitan area in New York State, and the fastest-growing region in Upstate New York.

The Capital District was first settled by the Dutch in the early 17th century and came under English control in 1664. Albany was the first city to be established in New York State, and has been the permanent capital of the state of New York since 1797. The Capital District is notable for many historical events that predate the independence of the United States, including the Albany Plan of Union and the Battles of Saratoga. Since 2020, the economy of Albany and the surrounding Capital District has been directed toward artificial intelligence, AI-based photonics, quantum computing hardware manufacturing, nanotechnology, and digital electronics.

== Etymology ==
The earliest known reference to the name "Capital District" stems from a Capital Police District that was created in the Albany area in the late 1860s, and was eventually reinforced by the central role played by Albany in both the region and in New York State.

In the 1910s, several economic and government organizations covering the area used "Capital District" in their name, such as the Capital District Conference of Charities and Corrections in 1913, the Capital District Life Underwriters Association also in 1913, and the Capital District Recreation League. The Capital District Recreation League, formed in 1916, proposed to create a Capital District Park in the area of the Shaker settlement.

=== Nicknames ===
Capitaland, Metroland, the Tri-City Area, and Tech Valley are nicknames sometimes used to refer to the Capital District. The region is often also called the 518 after the telephone area code that serves the Capital District.

The Capital District is a part of the area marketed under the name "Tech Valley" in recognition of the technology companies that have relocated to the region. The 19-county Tech Valley region, which extends from the Canada–US border south to Orange County, is marketed by organizations such as the Tech Valley Chamber Coalition, the Albany-Colonie Regional Chamber of Commerce, and the Albany-based Center for Economic Growth. In 2011, New York launched a Regional Council initiative under which the "Capital Region" became the state's official name for the eleven-county region consisting of 1.1 million people in Albany, Columbia, Fulton, Greene, Montgomery, Rensselaer, Saratoga, Schenectady, Schoharie, Warren and Washington counties.

== History ==
=== First settlements ===
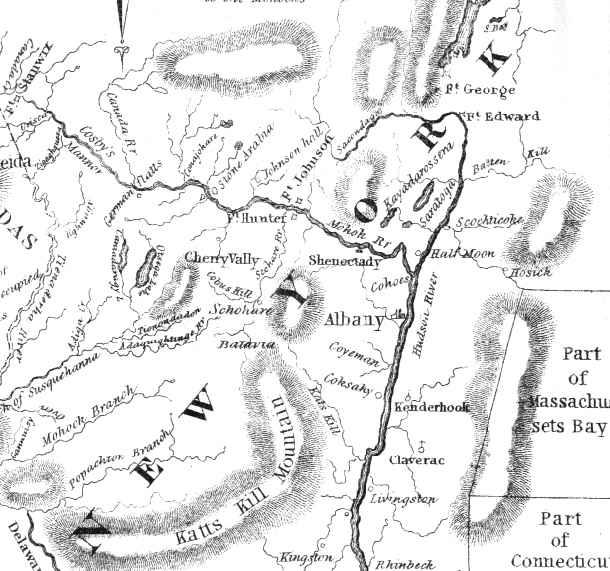
Capital District settlements in 1771

Permanent European claims and settlement began in 1609, when Henry Hudson sailed north up the Hudson River in the name of the Dutch. During the same year, Samuel Champlain explored south down Lake Champlain and Lake George in the name of France. Conflict soon ensued between the French and Dutch for control of the fur trade and both made alliances with different Native American tribes. In 1630, Kiliaen van Rensselaer founded the Manor of Rensselaerswyck, a Dutch patroonship in the area, which encompassed much of the area that is now the Capital District. In 1664, the English successfully conquered the Dutch while rivalry with the French continued. The Dutch, and then the English, maintained focus on settlement and farming while the French incursion into this area was limited to hunting for furs, trading with the natives, and building a few forts. Conflict arose when the French-built Fort Carillon and the British-built Fort William Henry near each other, both in order to control the route between the Hudson River Valley and the Champlain Valley.

Through the Dongan Charter, Governor Thomas Dongan granted Albany the right to purchase 500 acres (2.0 km^{2}) in "Schaahtecogue" (today Schaghticoke, in Rensselaer County) and 1,000 acres (4.0 km^{2}) at "Tionnondoroge" (today Fort Hunter, in Montgomery County). Arent van Curler founded Schenectady in 1662; Fort Saratoga was built at present-day Schuylerville in 1691; and Greenbush (present-day city of Rensselaer) was settled in the 1620s. South of Albany, settlement occurred quickly at first, but slowed as growth on the frontier pushed people north and west of Albany and left the southern reaches of the Capital District behind. Hudson, in Columbia County, was purchased from the natives in 1662 by Dutch farmers and speculators but did not see actual settlement and growth until 1783 when New Englanders, mainly from southeastern Massachusetts and Rhode Island, arrived; it was chartered as a city in 1785, becoming only the third city in the State of New York.

The French and Indian War saw several major battles in the Capital District, including at the aforementioned forts. In the end, the French were defeated, freeing the land for further settlement to the west and north of Albany. During the American Revolution the area again saw fighting and Fort Ticonderoga experienced notable action. The Battle of Saratoga, which took place in the present-day town of Stillwater, is considered the turning point of the war. In 1776, General Philip Schuyler built a small fleet of ships at Whitehall. They were used by Benedict Arnold in the Battle of Valcour Island. The event led to Whitehall's modern-day claim to be the birthplace of the United States Navy.

After the Revolution, settlements continued to proliferate west and north of the Albany area. North of Albany, along the river, settlements grew quickly: Waterford (oldest continuously incorporated village in the US, incorporated in 1794), Troy (settled in 1787, chartered as a village 1801, city in 1816), Lansingburgh (a village in 1763, annexed to Troy in 1900), and Watervliet (settled in 1643 and incorporated as a village in 1836 as West Troy, city in 1897). West from Schenectady, land purchases in the 1750s led to settlements at Fonda and Fultonville in Montgomery County, but land purchases elsewhere, such as at Gloversville in Fulton County did not see settlement until the end of the 18th century when the Iroquois threat had been eliminated by the Sullivan Expedition in 1779, which came as retaliation for the Cherry Valley Massacre in nearby Otsego County.

=== Creation of the counties ===
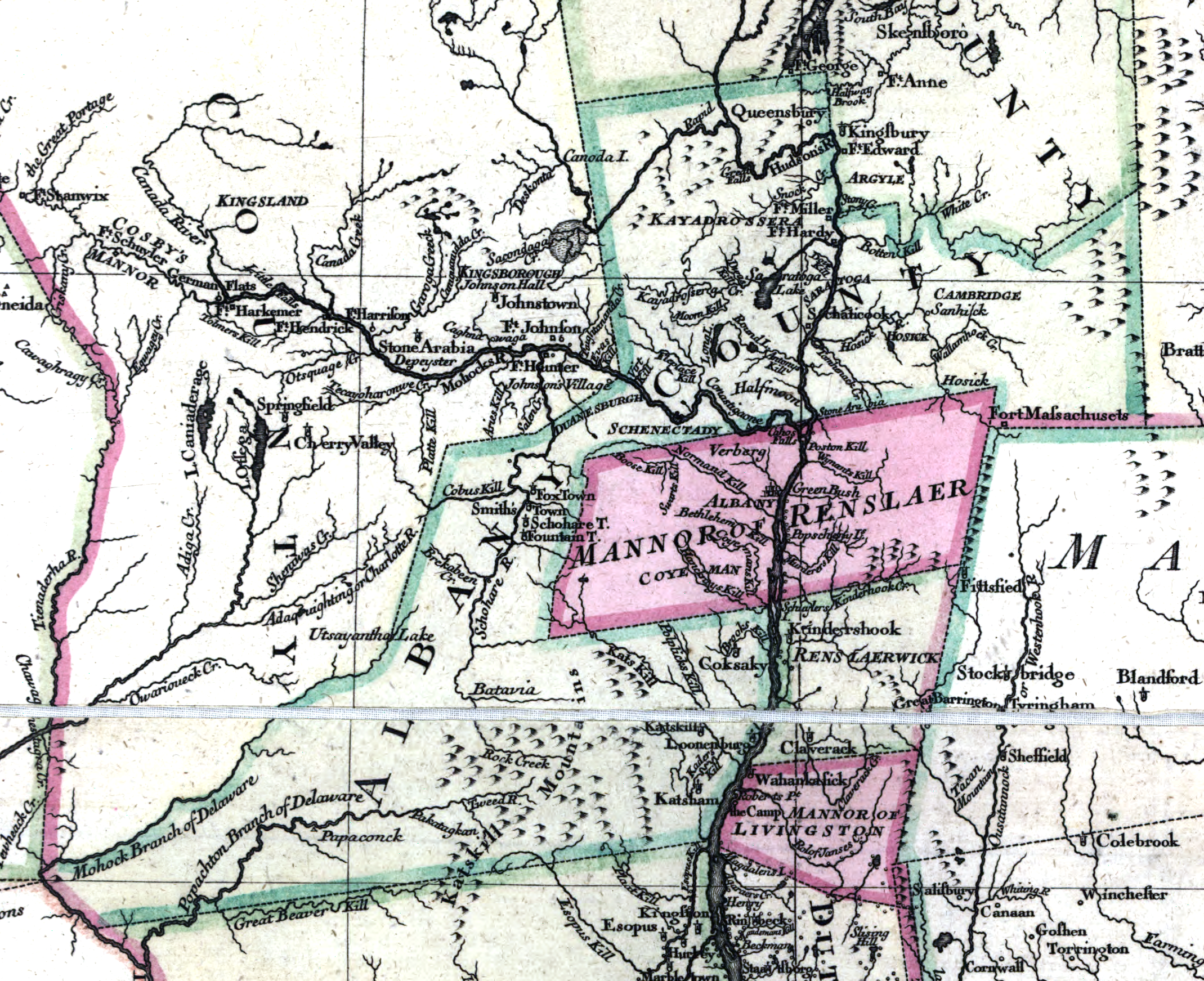
Albany County in 1777

The entire area of the Capital District was within the original boundaries of Albany County as established by the Province of New York on November 1, 1683; it was one of the original 12 counties. In 1772, Charlotte County and Tryon County were both formed from parts of Albany County. Charlotte County was renamed Washington County in 1784, and from part of that, Warren County was created in 1813. Tryon County was renamed Montgomery County in 1784, and from part of that, Fulton County was created in 1838. Tryon County was large: it encompassed the lands from five miles (8 km) west of Schenectady to the western indeterminate boundary of the Province of New York.

What remained of Albany County in 1774 became the most populated county in the state with a population of 42,921 and it continued to be the most populous county until at least 1790, when the population was 75,921. Albany lost population as new counties were created from within: Columbia County was created in 1786; Rensselaer and Saratoga counties were formed in 1791; Schoharie County was created in 1795 from parts of both Albany and Otsego counties (Otsego having been created from part of Montgomery County in 1791); Greene County was formed in 1800 from parts of both Albany and Ulster counties; Schenectady County was created in 1809; and Warren County was formed in 1813 from Washington County. Fulton County was the last county in the Capital District to be formed. A graphical representation of the county breakup timeline can be seen below.

Timeline of the breakup of the counties in the Capital District

=== Urbanization and transportation ===
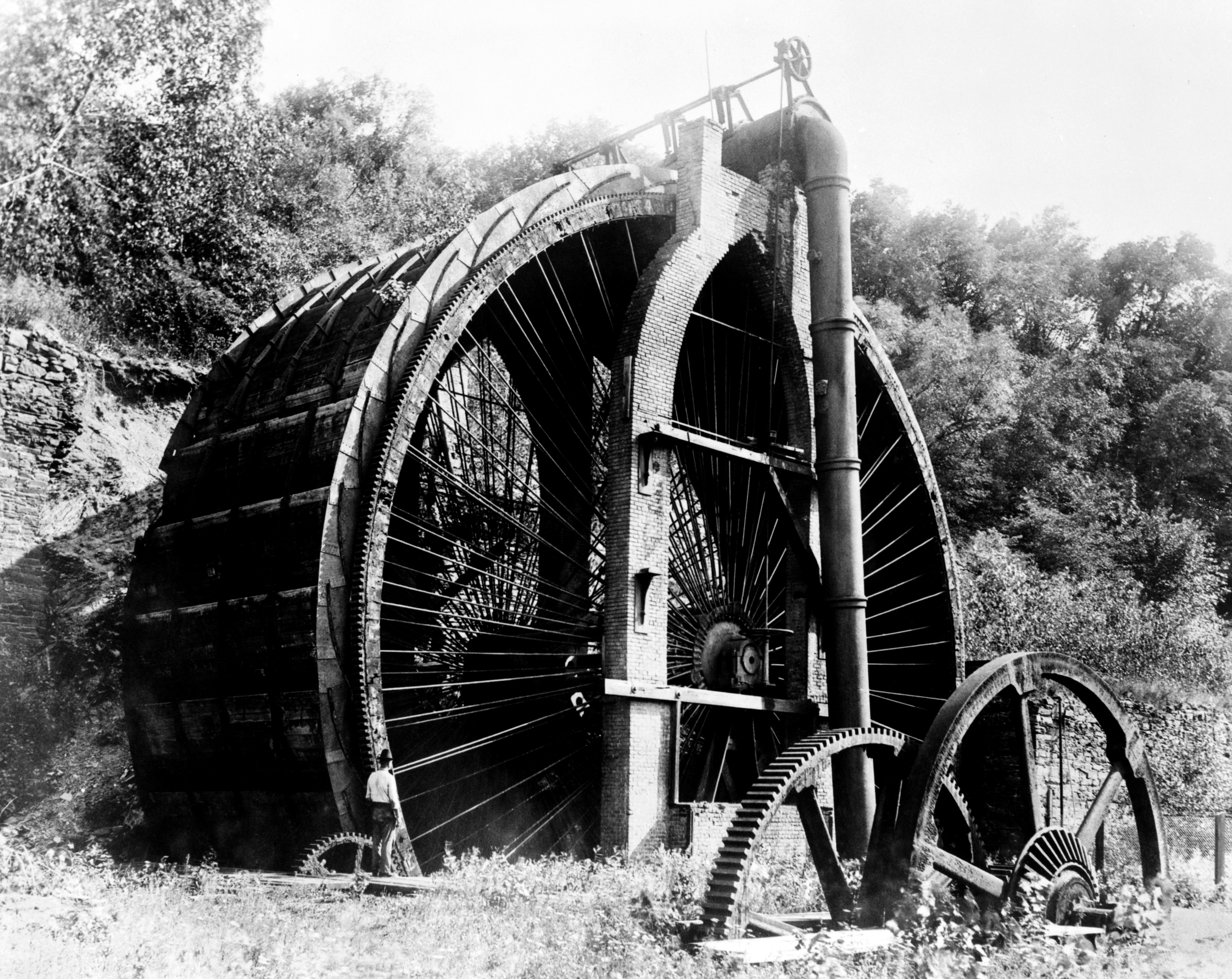
Waterwheel at Burden Iron Works on the Wynantskill in Troy

The Champlain and Erie canals were opened in 1823, and 1825, respectively. Their completion connected the area to the Great Lakes and Saint Lawrence River, leading to a large influx in industrialization and immigration. Shortly after the completion of the canals, in 1831, the Mohawk and Hudson Railroad Company (M&H) built the Albany and Schenectady Railroad between those two cities. This was the first railway in the state. Railroads, like the plank/post roads and canals before them, made Albany an even more important transportation hub. In 1853 Erastus Corning consolidated 10 railroads stretching from Albany to Buffalo as the New York Central Railroad, headquartered in Albany until Cornelius Vanderbilt took over in 1867 and moved the company to New York City.

Industry consequently became prominent in the area. Gloversville was labeled the "headquarters of the glove and mitten industry" and became the preeminent glove-manufacturing and leather-working region in New York. Cohoes became known as the "Spindle City" for its large cotton mills, due mainly to Harmony Mills, the largest cotton mill complex in the world when it opened in 1872. Troy became famous for its iron works due to Burden Iron Works, though later Troy would earn the nickname of "Collar City" due to Cluett, Peabody & Co., which made Arrow brand shirts at the largest collar, cuff, and shirt factory in the world at the time. In 1887 Thomas Edison moved his Edison Machine Works to Schenectady, and in 1892 Schenectady became the headquarters of the General Electric Company (GE). Schenectady Locomotive Works, along with seven other locomotive manufacturers, merged in 1901 and the American Locomotive Company (ALCO) was formed and headquartered in Schenectady. Due to the dominance of GE and ALCO in their respective industries, Schenectady would gain the nicknames of "Electric City" and "The City that Lights and Hauls the World". The nature of this industry lent itself to the creation of many labor-saving inventions, such as the horseshoe machine of Henry Burden, the pre-shrinking fabric machines of Sanford Cluett, the power knitting loom of Timothy Bailey, the railroad air-brake of George Westinghouse, and the hundreds of electricity-related improvements of General Electric Company scientists.

=== Rise of the suburbs and urban decline and renewal ===
Starting with the 1980 United States census, Albany posted a decline in population until the 2000 U.S. census. Meanwhile, the suburbs saw an influx in population and grew at the expense of the city of Albany. There were many causes to this, including the building of interstates and other highways allowing for more commuting, lack of available suitable land within the urban centers, and the subsequent location of shopping centers following the people to the suburbs.

The decline of exporting from the United States contributed to a general decline as well. Watervliet, Cohoes, and especially Troy lost a competitive edge that came with being at the confluence of the Hudson and Mohawk rivers: the location no longer meant better access to markets, waterfalls no longer made the cheapest power, and cheap labor in the southern and western parts of the nation became important to companies. General Electric moved part of their headquarters to Connecticut from Schenectady in the mid-1980s. Within the Capital District focus shifted to the suburbs. The suburbs had large open spaces for office parks and homes while the cities were constrained in available land. Albany International, with their headquarters and factory straddling the Menands and Albany border, built a new headquarters in 1987 in suburban East Greenbush, as did Garden Way, headquartered in Troy. The region's first technology park was built in the 1980s in North Greenbush by Rensselaer Polytechnic Institute (RPI).

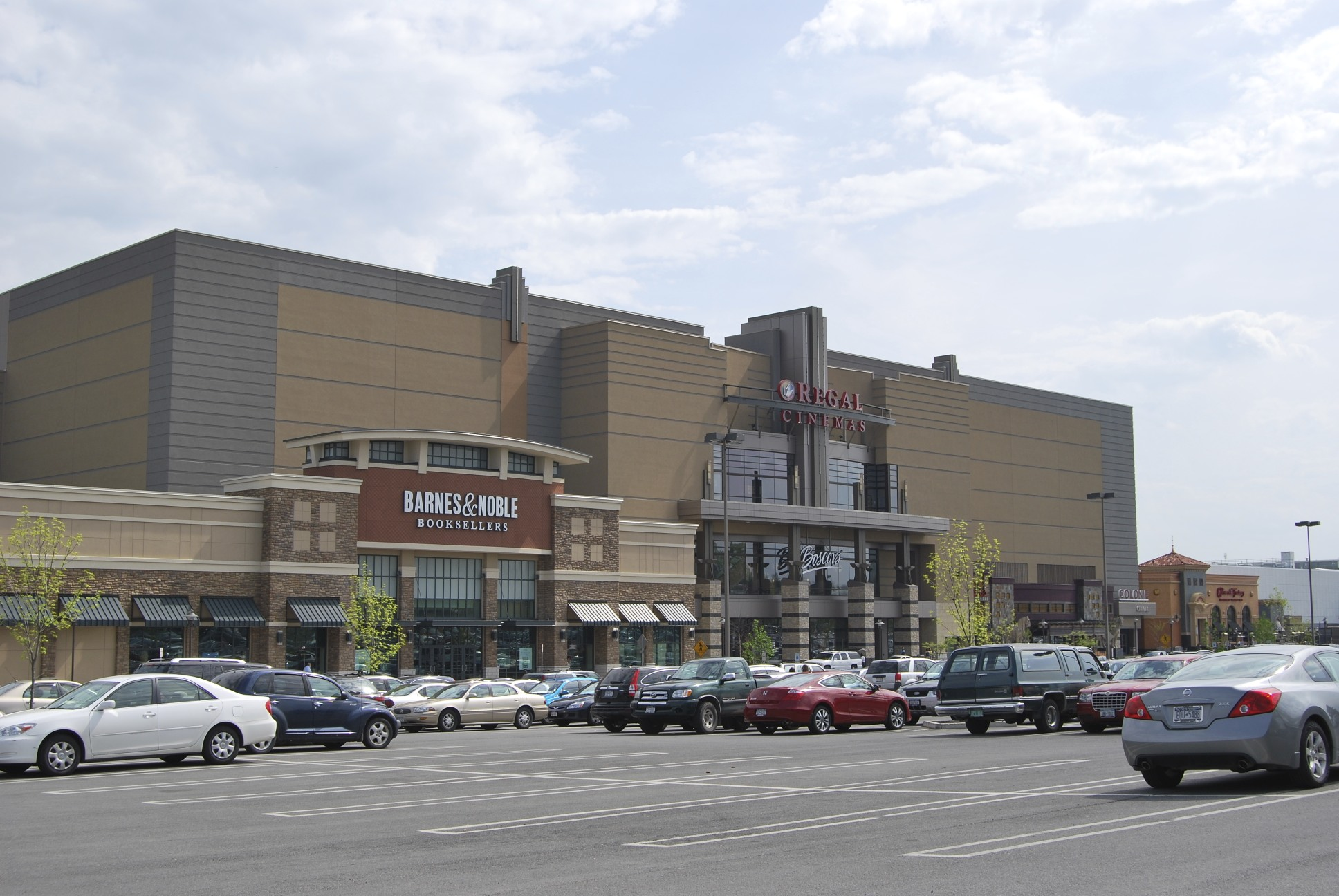
Colonie Center, the Capital District's first enclosed mall

Not only was there a shift in population to the suburbs, a shift in retail shopping occurred as well. Retail sales in the cities declined a percent between 1972 and 1987, while having increased 63 percent in the suburbs. Although it was, and still is, within the city limits of Albany, Westgate Plaza opened in 1957 as the area's first "suburban"-style shopping center. Two years later, Stuyvesant Plaza was built outside Albany, in the neighboring town of Guilderland. 1966 saw the opening of the area's first enclosed shopping mall, Colonie Center in Colonie, which drew shoppers from hundreds of miles away. Both Macy's, which up until this time only had locations in the New York City area, and Sears originally wanted to build stores in downtown Albany, but chose to move into suburban Colonie Center after having encountered interference from Albany's Mayor Corning.

Several more enclosed malls were built in the area after Colonie Center's debut, all outside Albany limits: Mohawk Mall in Niskayuna in 1970, Aviation Mall in Queensbury in 1975, Clifton Park Center in Clifton Park in 1976 (originally known as Clifton Country Mall), Rotterdam Square outside Schenectady in 1988, and the Wilton Mall at Saratoga in Wilton, in 1990. The first mall built within a downtown area was completed in 1977 as the Amsterdam Mall in Amsterdam. In 1979, the Uncle Sam Atrium opened in downtown Troy and, in 1986 Cohoes Commons opened in Cohoes, but by 2000 was nearly empty and is now office space. Crossgates Mall, a large upscale mall built in Guilderland in 1984, is now the fourth-largest mall in New York state. A modern expansion of Crossgates Mall in 1994 attracted luxury retailer Lord & Taylor as an anchor, as well as another Macy's to the area.

Capitalizing on young professionals’ growing interest in living in walkable urban downtowns, the City of Albany has countered the shift to the suburbs with an apartment building boom. The effort to bring more residents to downtown Albany began gaining momentum in 1996 through the creation of the Albany Business Improvement District. Since 2002, the Capitalize Albany Corp. has been fueling the downtown residential strategy by allocating resources to building owners, developers and investors. In the early 2000s, the effort started with a series of small luxury apartment projects on Albany's North Pearl and State Streets and later expanded to several major developments both in downtown and just beyond it. Those major projects include: the conversion of a vacant industrial building into the 42-unit Monroe Apartments in 2012; the redevelopment of the former arcade building on Broadway into a 60-unit complex; and the $80 million redevelopment of the former Knickerbocker News building into The Knick, a 132-apartment complex in 2019. By 2020, more than $110 million in downtown investments had supported the completion of 650 residential units had been completed in Albany and 400 more were in development.

Other Capital Region cities have also similarly pursued downtown revitalization efforts. In the 20 years since its creation in 1998, Schenectady's Metroplex Development Authority leveraged $249 million in sales tax revenues and grants to support 700 projects with a value of $1.3 billion and 8,000 jobs. Glens Falls was the winner of the Capital Region city to be awarded $10 million through Gov. Andrew Cuomo's Downtown Revitalization Initiative (DRI) in 2017. Subsequent $10 million DRI winners have included Hudson and Albany. In the city of Saratoga Springs, there was a 1,352, or 11.7 percent, increase in housing units between 2000 and 2010.

== Geography ==
Historical population
| Census | Pop. | Note | %± |
|---|---|---|---|
| 1900 | 334,120 | | — |
| 1910 | 384,177 | | 15.0% |
| 1920 | 408,398 | | 6.3% |
| 1930 | 456,755 | | 11.8% |
| 1940 | 465,643 | | 1.9% |
| 1950 | 514,490 | | 10.5% |
| 1960 | 680,119 | | 32.2% |
| 1970 | 746,660 | | 9.8% |
| 1980 | 771,290 | | 3.3% |
| 1990 | 809,443 | | 4.9% |
| 2000 | 825,875 | | 2.0% |
| 2010 | 870,716 | | 5.4% |
| 2020 | 899,262 | | 3.3% |
| 2025 (est.) | 915,835 | | 1.8% |
U.S. Decennial Census

According to the Albany Times Union, the Capital District includes 11 counties: Albany, Columbia, Fulton, Greene, Montgomery, Rensselaer, Saratoga, Schenectady, Schoharie, Warren, and Washington. The lower part of the Capital District is sometimes considered to be part of the Hudson Valley. The map in the infobox at the top of this page highlights those 11 counties. However, the Empire State Development Corporation (ESDC) asserts that the Capital District consists of only eight counties (the counties of Fulton, Montgomery, and Schoharie are not included). The ESDC's definition of the Capital District is reflected in the map below the infobox, which is marked "Regions of New York". This page will utilize the Times Union's definition unless otherwise indicated.

The 11 counties of the Capital District are divided into 13 cities and 143 towns, with 62 villages that are inside one or more towns. One village, Green Island, is coterminous with its town.

The Capital District encompasses parts of the southern and southeastern Adirondacks to the northern parts of its limits.

| County | 2025 Estimate | 2020 Census | Change | Area | Density |
|---|---|---|---|---|---|
| Albany County | 321,225 | 314,848 | +2.03% | 522.80 sq mi (1,354.0 km^{2}) | 614/sq mi (237/km^{2}) |
| Saratoga County | 241,343 | 235,509 | +2.48% | 809.98 sq mi (2,097.8 km^{2}) | 298/sq mi (115/km^{2}) |
| Schenectady County | 162,581 | 158,061 | +2.86% | 204.52 sq mi (529.7 km^{2}) | 795/sq mi (307/km^{2}) |
| Rensselaer County | 160,510 | 161,130 | −0.38% | 652.43 sq mi (1,689.8 km^{2}) | 246/sq mi (95/km^{2}) |
| Schoharie County | 30,176 | 29,714 | +1.55% | 621.82 sq mi (1,610.5 km^{2}) | 49/sq mi (19/km^{2}) |
| Total | 915,835 | 899,262 | +1.84% | 2,811.55 sq mi (7,281.9 km^{2}) | 326/sq mi (126/km^{2}) |

== Climate ==
Albany

Climate chart (precipitation, max. and min. temperature)
| J | F | M | A | M | J | J | A | S | O | N | D |
| 2.7 31 13 | 2.3 34 16 | 3.2 45 25 | 3.3 57 36 | 3.7 70 47 | 3.8 78 55 | 3.5 82 60 | 3.7 80 58 | 3.3 71 50 | 3.2 60 39 | 3.3 48 31 | 2.8 36 20 |
- █ Average max. and min. temperatures in °F
- █ Precipitation totals in inches
- Source: USTravelWeather.com
Metric conversion
| J | F | M | A | M | J | J | A | S | O | N | D |
| 69 0 −10 | 58 1 −9 | 81 7 −4 | 83 14 2 | 93 21 8 | 95 25 13 | 89 28 16 | 93 27 15 | 84 22 10 | 82 15 4 | 84 9 −1 | 70 2 −7 |
- █ Average max. and min. temperatures in °C
- █ Precipitation totals in mm

The Capital District has a humid continental climate, with cold, snowy winters, and hot, wet summers. The region stands at a temperate sweet spot in New York State, annually receiving on average much less snow than other upstate metro areas and much less precipitation than downstate cities. For example, between 1980 and 2010, the 25-mile area around Albany on average received 60.3 inches of snow. That was 105 percent less snow than the same sized area around Syracuse received, 65 percent less than the Rochester area, 57 percent less than the Buffalo area and 38 percent less than the Binghamton area. During the same period, the Albany area averaged received 39.35 inches of rain. That was 18 percent less rain than the Poughkeepsie area, 25 percent less rain than the Westchester area and 18 percent less rain than the Islip area.

Albany receives around 36.2 inches of rain per year, with 135 days of at least .01 inches of precipitation. Snowfall is significant, totaling about 63 inches annually, but with less accumulation than the lake-effect areas to the north and west, being far enough from Lake Ontario. The core of the region is however, close enough to the coast to receive heavy snow from Nor'easters, and the region gets the bulk of its yearly snowfall from these types of storms. The region also occasionally receives Alberta clippers. Mohawk–Hudson convergence occasionally prolongs snowfall events in the Capital District, where precipitation has ended elsewhere across the region.

Albany receives on average per year 69 sunny days, 111 partly cloudy days, and 185 cloudy days; and an average, over the course of a year, of less than four hours of sunshine per day, with just over an average of 2.5 hours per day over the course of the winter. The chance during daylight hours of sunshine is 53%, with the highest percentage of sunny daylight hours being in July with 64%, and the lowest month is November with 37%.

== Cityscape ==
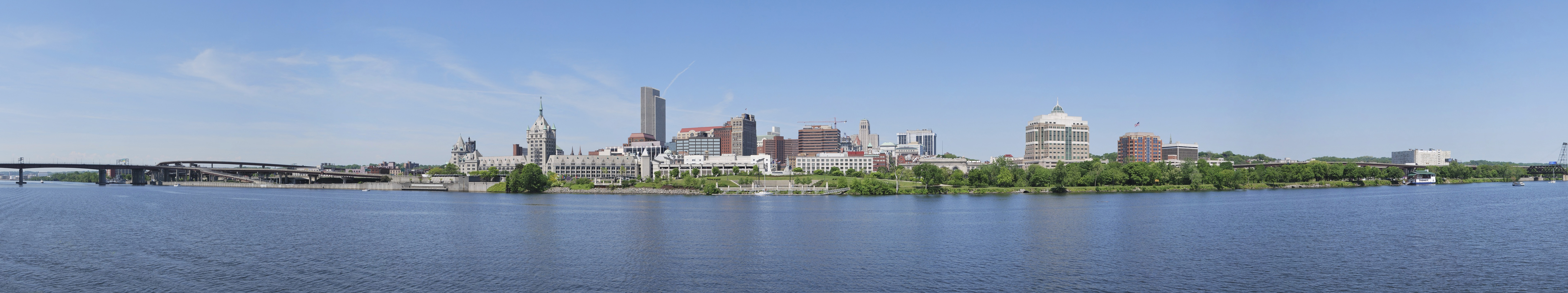
Panorama of the New York state capital Albany and the Hudson River from Rensselaer, New York.

=== Architecture ===
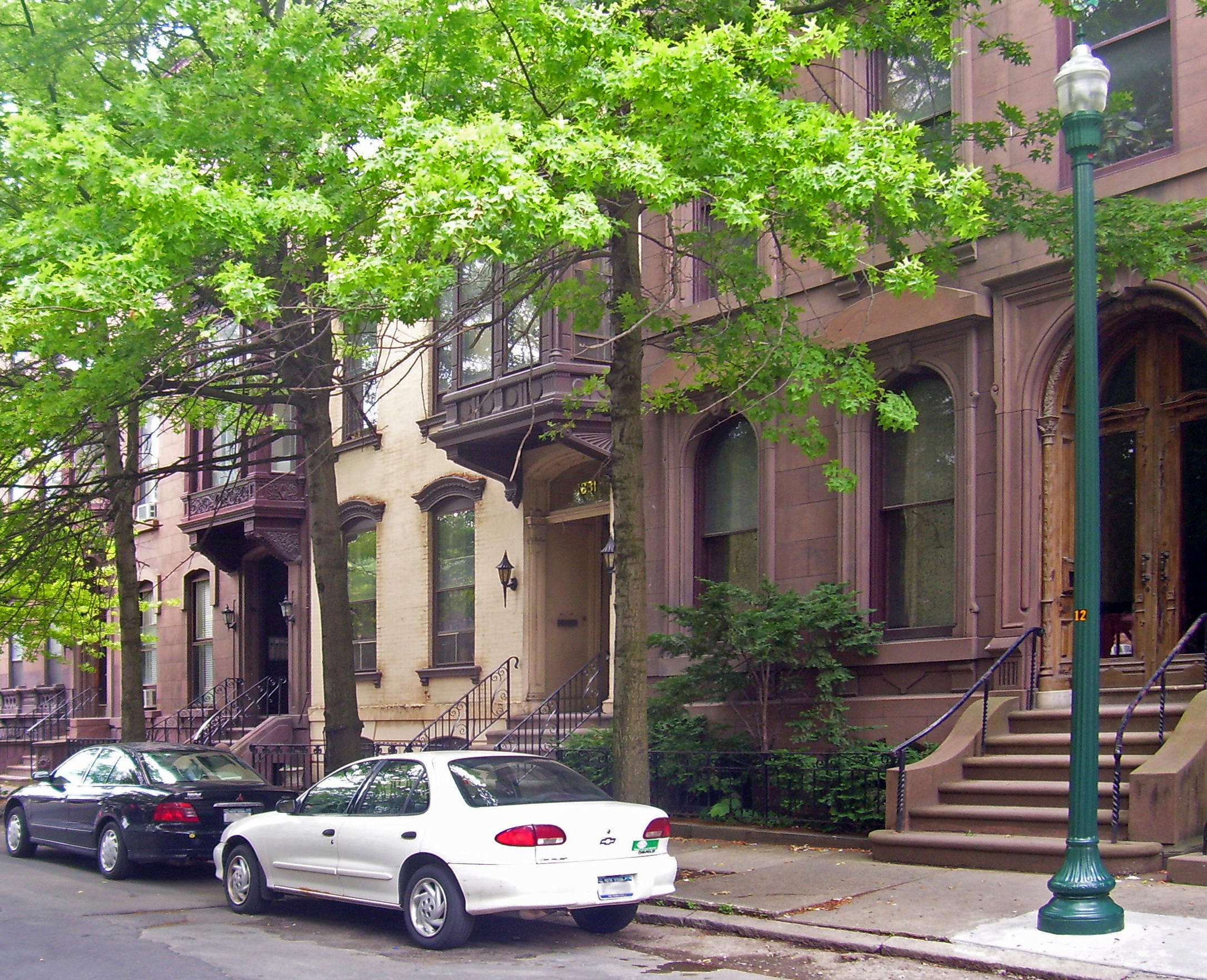
Several brownstones on Fifth Avenue in Troy

The Capital District, having a history of settlement stretching back 400 years, has had many different architectural styles built over the years. Early Dutch farmhouses are still standing in the rural towns, especially west of Albany, such as the Mabee House. The Van Ostrande-Radliff House (1728) in Albany and the Rosa House in Schenectady (before 1700) are the oldest houses in each city. In 1885 American Architect and Building News, a magazine with national circulation, polled its readers asking what the nation's Top Ten most beautiful buildings were. Two buildings in the city of Albany made the list: Albany City Hall and the New York State Capitol; both finished in 1883 and designed by Henry Hobson Richardson.

Troy has many distinctive features in architecture that sets it apart, such as its ornamental ironwork, cast-iron storefronts such as the Arts Center of the Capital Region, and the abundance of windows by Tiffany such as St. John's Episcopal Church, Troy Public Library, and St. Paul's Episcopal Church. The Capital District also has a large selection of brownstone buildings especially in the Center Square neighborhood of Albany and the Washington Park neighborhood in Troy. Washington Park in Troy is one of only two privately owned urban ornamental parks in the state.

Schenectady's Stockade neighborhood has representations of residential architecture from all periods in its 300-year history including Dutch, Federal, Greek Revival, Gothic Revival, and Victorian. Also in Schenectady is the GE Realty Plot built by General Electric as homes for their employees, the houses are in revival styles such as Tudor, Georgian, Queen Anne, Dutch Colonial, and Spanish Colonial. The first all electric house was built by GE in the Realty Plot to showcase its products. In Albany's Pine Hills neighborhood is a style of residential architecture that is rare in the rest of the Capital District, bungalows in the Spanish revival style, with red tile roofs and stucco walls, only 27 still exist and are the remnants of the Winchester Gables development.

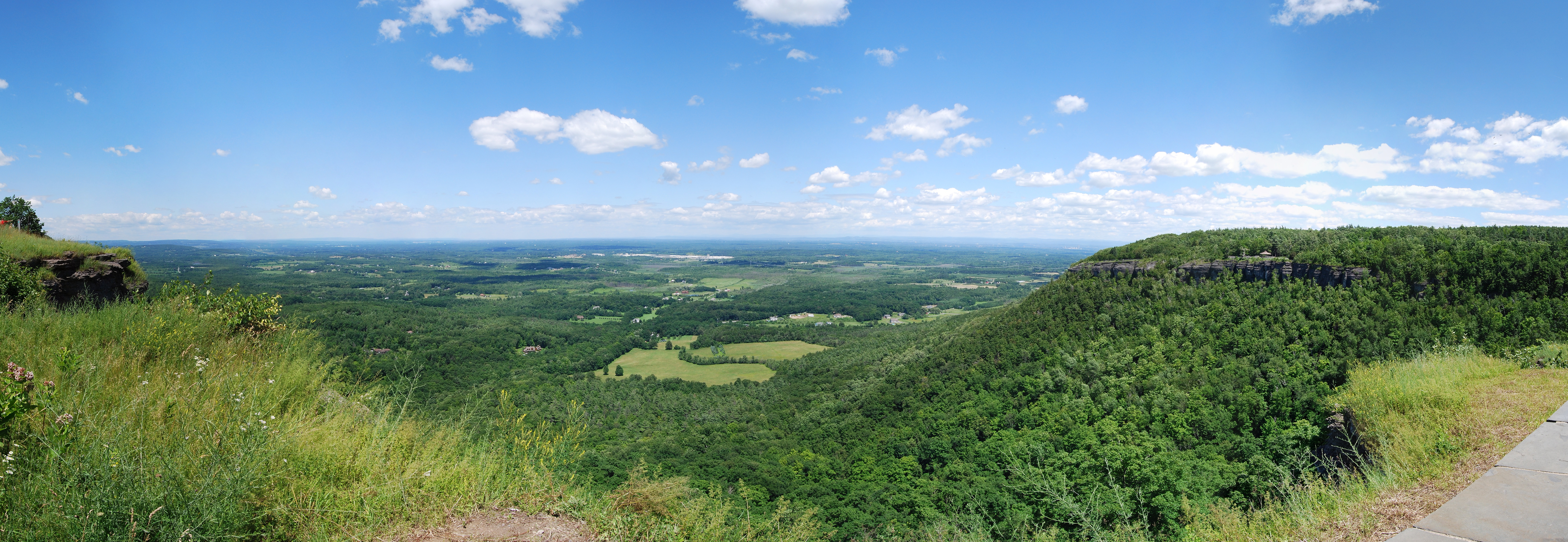
View of Albany County from Thacher State Park

During the winter months the Capital District has many places to go for such cold-weather activities as skiing, snowboarding, tubing, ice fishing, snowshoeing, snowmobiling, and ice climbing. Some downhill ski centers include West Mountain and Gore Mountain in Warren County, Maple Ski Ridge in Schenectady County, Willard Mountain in Washington County, Windham Mountain and Hunter Mountain in Greene County. In addition to downhill skiing most also have cross-country skiing trails as well. There are also cross-country trails at the state parks in the area, the Schenectady County Forest in Duanesburg and Pine Ridge XC Ski Area in Rensselaer County. There are over 18 miles (29 km) of official trails for snowshoeing at the Albany Pine Bush Preserve. Lake George, known as the "Queen of the Lakes" in the United States, also has an annual winter carnival every weekend in February.

== Demographics ==
The Capital District is one of New York's most affluent metro areas in Upstate New York. Home to an estimated 913,000 residents as of 2024, the Capital District is the third-most populous metropolitan area in the State of New York. Median household income was roughly $76,000 in 2022 and its educational attainment profile, with 40 percent of adults 25+ having a college degree, is at the state average and above the national average.

=== Metropolitan Statistical Area ===
The Albany–Schenectady–Troy NY Metropolitan Statistical Area (MSA) is defined by the United States Office of Management and Budget. The MSA includes Albany, Rensselaer, Saratoga, Schenectady, and Schoharie counties; this area makes up a large portion of the Capital District. As of the 2020 census, the Albany–Schenectady–Troy MSA had a population of 899,262, increasing to an estimated 1.3 million residents as of 2024.

=== Combined Statistical Area ===
The Albany–Schenectady NY Combined Statistical Area (CSA) includes 10 of the 11 counties in the Times Union definition of the Capital District (excluding only Greene County). The Albany–Schenectady–Troy NY Metropolitan Statistical Area (MSA) combines with the Glens Falls, New York MSA (consisting of Warren and Washington counties) and three Micropolitan Statistical Areas to make up the Albany–Schenectady NY Combined Statistical Area (CSA). The three Micropolitan Statistical Areas within the CSA are the Gloversville (μSA) (formed in 1990), which consists of Fulton County; the Amsterdam μSA (also formed in 1990), which consists of Montgomery County; and the Hudson μSA (also formed in 1990), which consists of Columbia County.

As of the 2020 U.S. census, the Albany–Schenectady NY Combined Statistical Area had a population of 1,190,727. Adding the 2020 population of Greene County (47,931) to the population of the CSA (1,190,727) yielded a total 2020 Capital District population of 1,238,658.

== Education ==
=== School districts ===
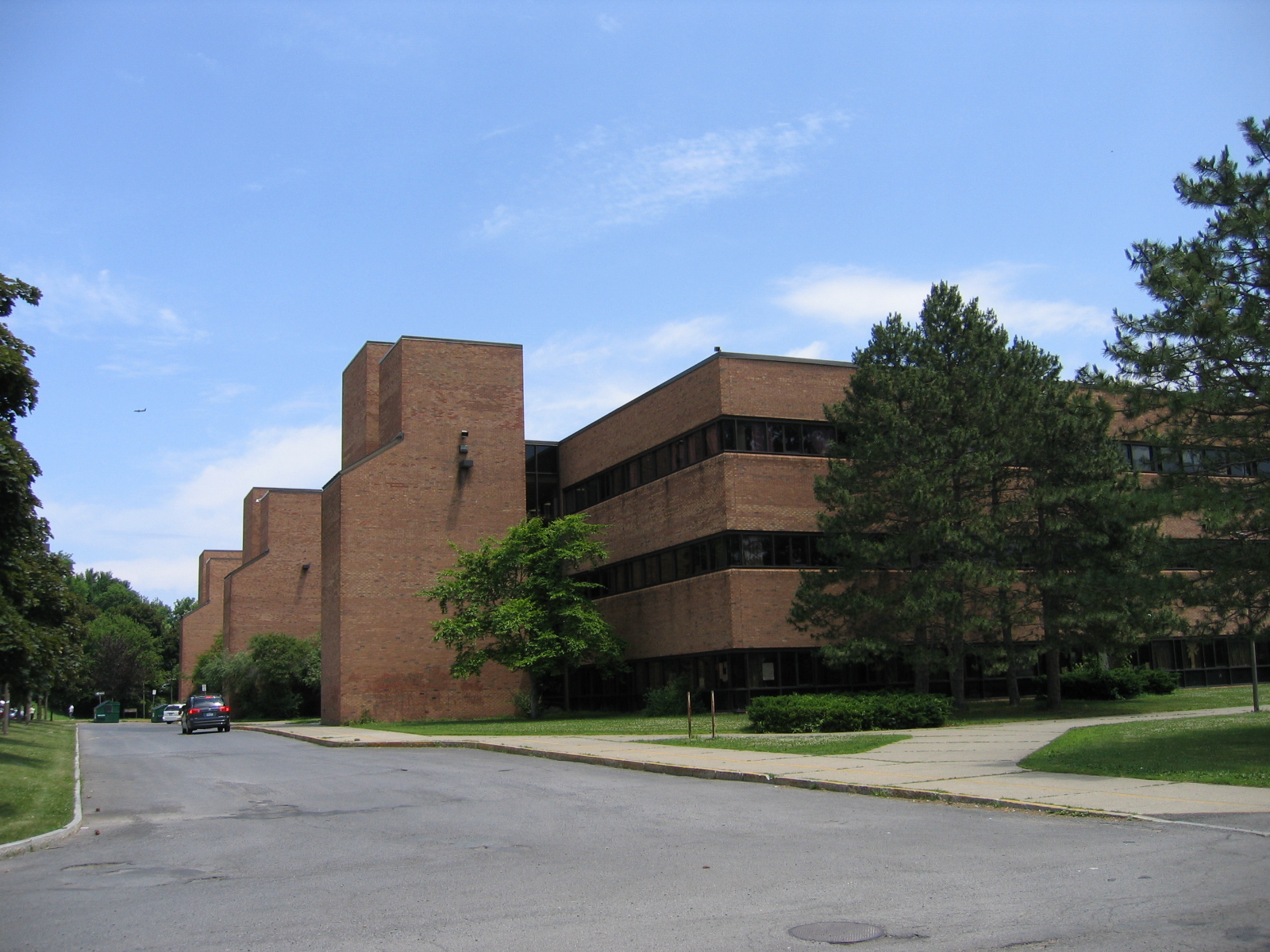
Albany High School

In Albany, Rensselaer, Saratoga, and Schenectady counties there are 54 public school districts, each of which is under the umbrella of one of four Boards of Cooperative Educational Services (BOCES) in the area: Capital Region BOCES, Questar III (Rensselaer-Columbia-Greene BOCES), Washington-Saratoga-Warren-Hamilton-Essex BOCES, or Hamilton-Fulton-Montgomery BOCES. Some of these districts cross county borders since school district boundaries are independent of town and county borders. The smallest district by student enrollment is North Greenbush Common School District, with 20 students in 2006 and the largest school district is Shenendehowa Central School District, with 9,745 students in the end of the 2008 school year. According to Niche.com and U.S. News & World Report, Shaker High School in Latham, Niskayuna Central High School in Niskayuna, Columbia High School in East Greenbush, and Bethlehem Central Senior High School in Delmar are the highest ranked public high schools in the Capital District.

=== Colleges and universities ===
Two college buildings representing the past and the future, the Nott built in 1879 and EMPAC in 2008

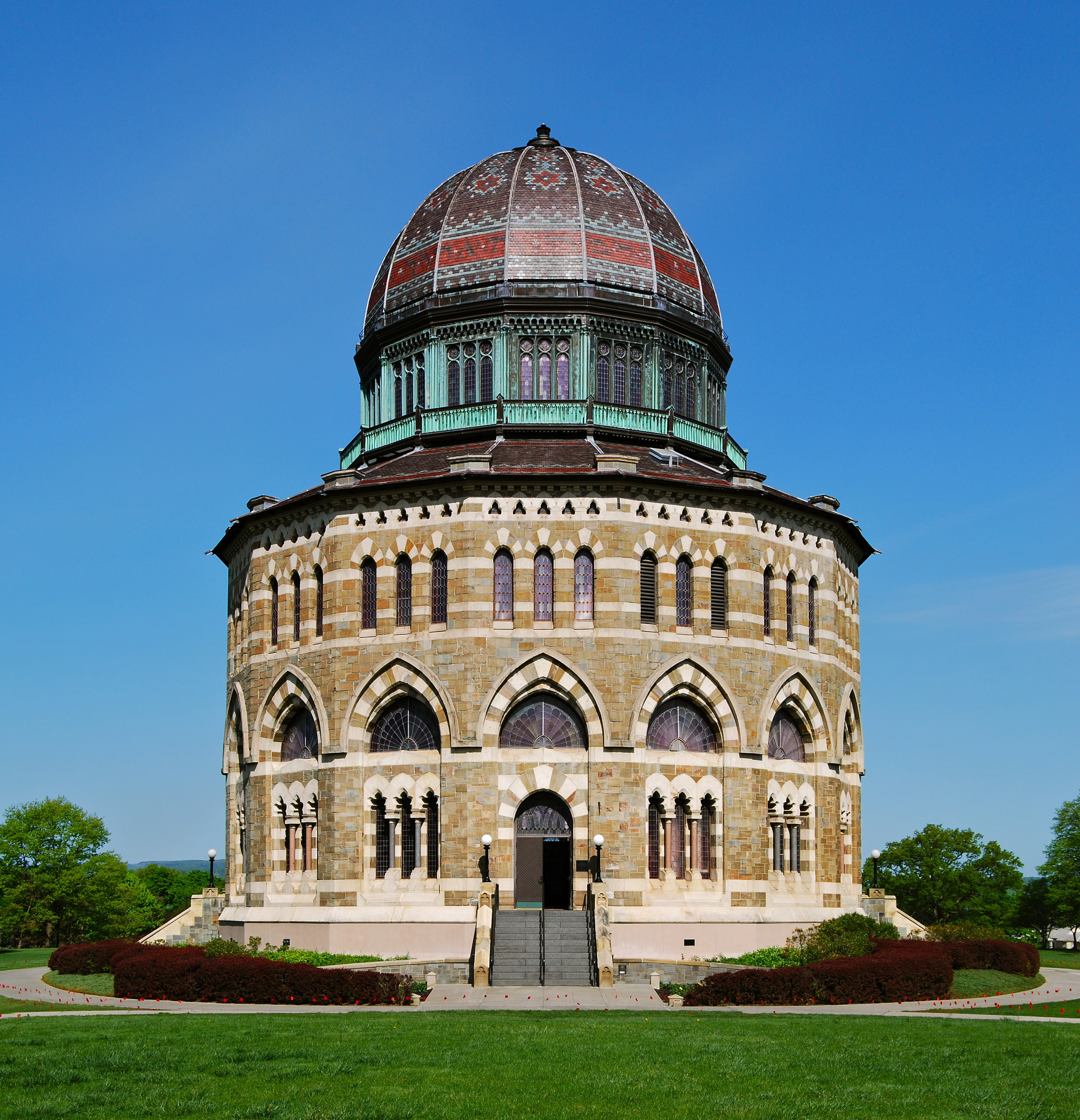
Nott Memorial at Union College

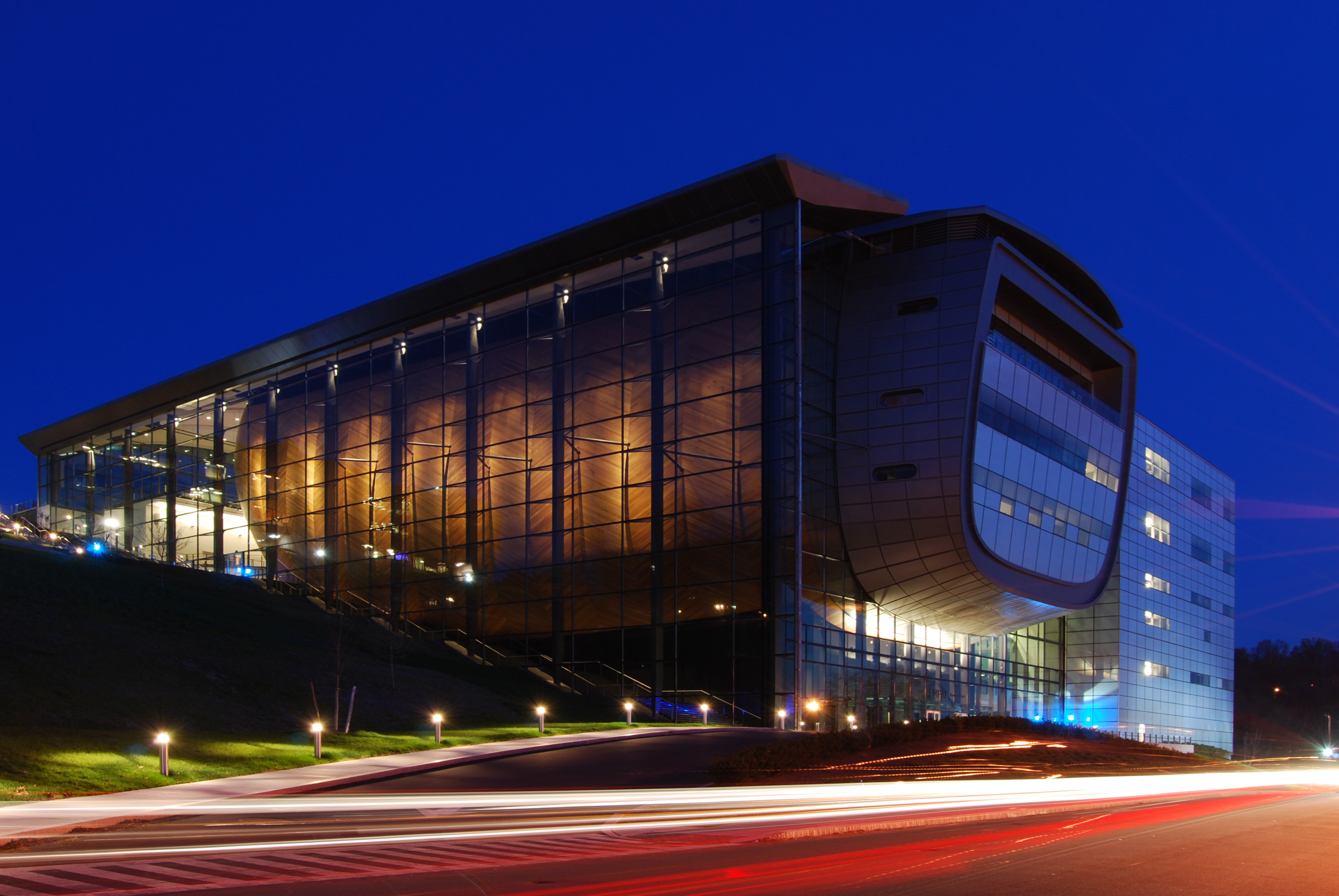
Experimental Media and Performing Arts Center at RPI

The largest educational institution in the Capital District is the University at Albany, one of the four major university centers of the State University of New York.

Founded in 1795, Union College was the alma mater of President Chester A. Arthur.

Rensselaer Polytechnic Institute in Troy is the oldest continuously existing technical university in the English-speaking world.

== Economy ==
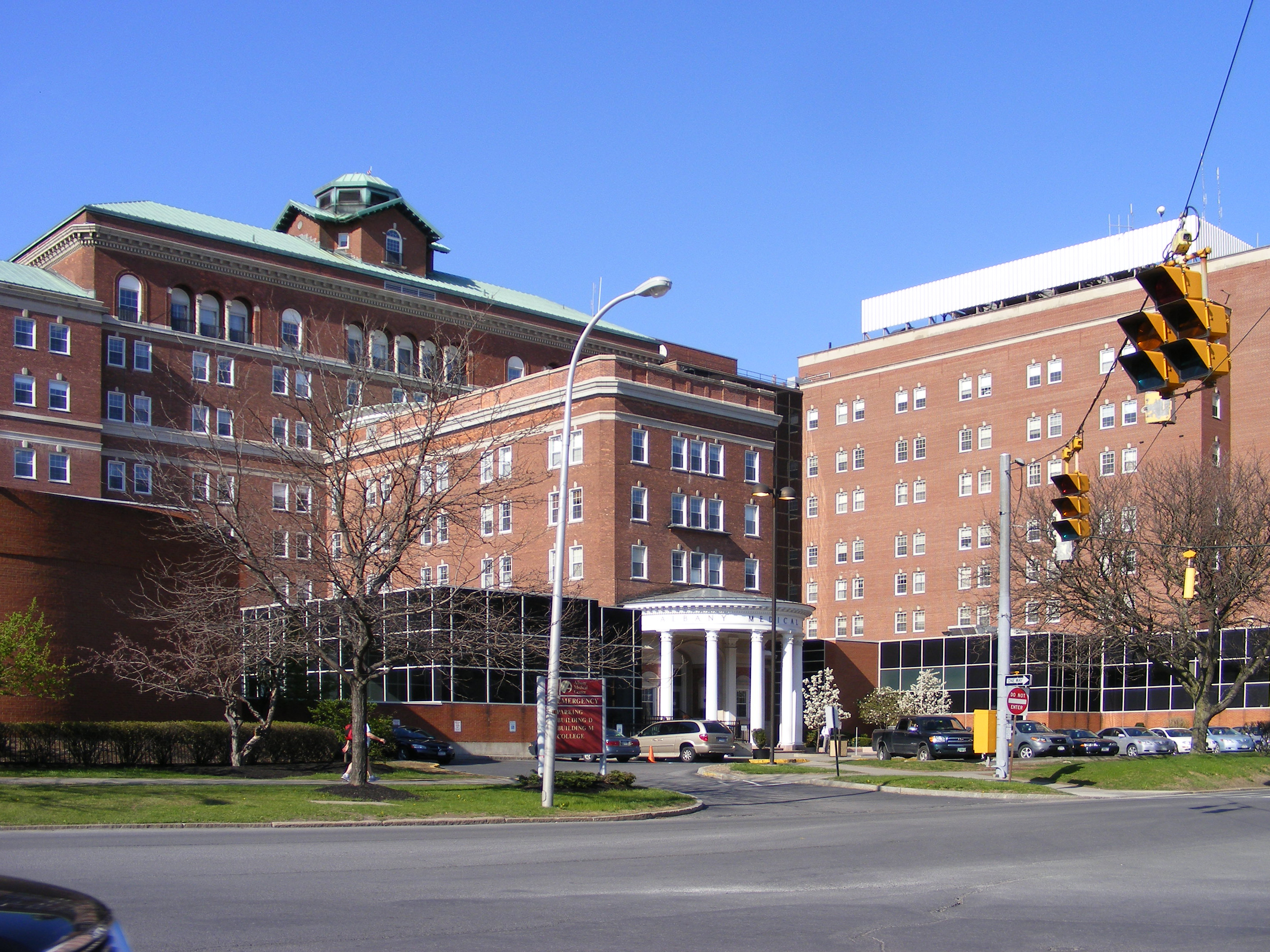
Albany Medical Center, the fourth largest employer in the Capital District

The economy of the Capital District is heavily anchored by the state government. There have traditionally been three legs holding up the region's economy: State government, health care, and education. Albany has the fourth-highest amount of lawyers in its employment pool (7.5 lawyers per 1,000 jobs) in the nation, behind Washington, D.C.; Trenton, New Jersey; and New York City, respectively. Many important regional and national banks are headquartered in the area.

=== Tech Valley ===
Since the 2000s, the economy of the Capital District has been redirected toward high technology. Tech Valley is a marketing name for the eastern part of New York State, encompassing the Capital District and the Hudson Valley. Originated in 1998 to promote the greater Albany area as a high-tech competitor to regions such as Silicon Valley and Boston, the region has since grown to represent the counties in the Capital District and extending to IBM's Westchester County plants in the south and the Canada–US border to the north. The area's high technology ecosystem is supported by technologically focused academic institutions including Rensselaer Polytechnic Institute and the State University of New York Polytechnic Institute. Tech Valley encompasses 19 counties straddling both sides of the Adirondack Northway and the New York Thruway, and with heavy state taxpayer subsidy, has experienced significant growth in the computer hardware side of the high-technology industry, with great strides in artificial intelligence, the nanotechnology sector, digital electronics design, and water- and electricity-dependent integrated microchip circuit manufacturing. In April 2021, GlobalFoundries, a company specializing in the semiconductor industry, moved its headquarters from Silicon Valley, California to its most advanced semiconductor-chip manufacturing facility in Saratoga County, New York near a section of the Adirondack Northway, in Malta, New York.

Fueled by its urban counties (Albany, Schenectady, Rensselaer, Saratoga), the region is one of only 51 metros in the nation where businesses annually spend more than $1 billion on R&D. A substantial amount of those expenditures are in the field of semiconductor research, so much so that 1,404 semiconductor device-related patents awarded by the U.S. Patent and Trademark Office in 2019 listed an inventor in the eight-county Capital Region – more than any other state in the nation except California and excluding the whole of New York.

== Culture and contemporary life ==
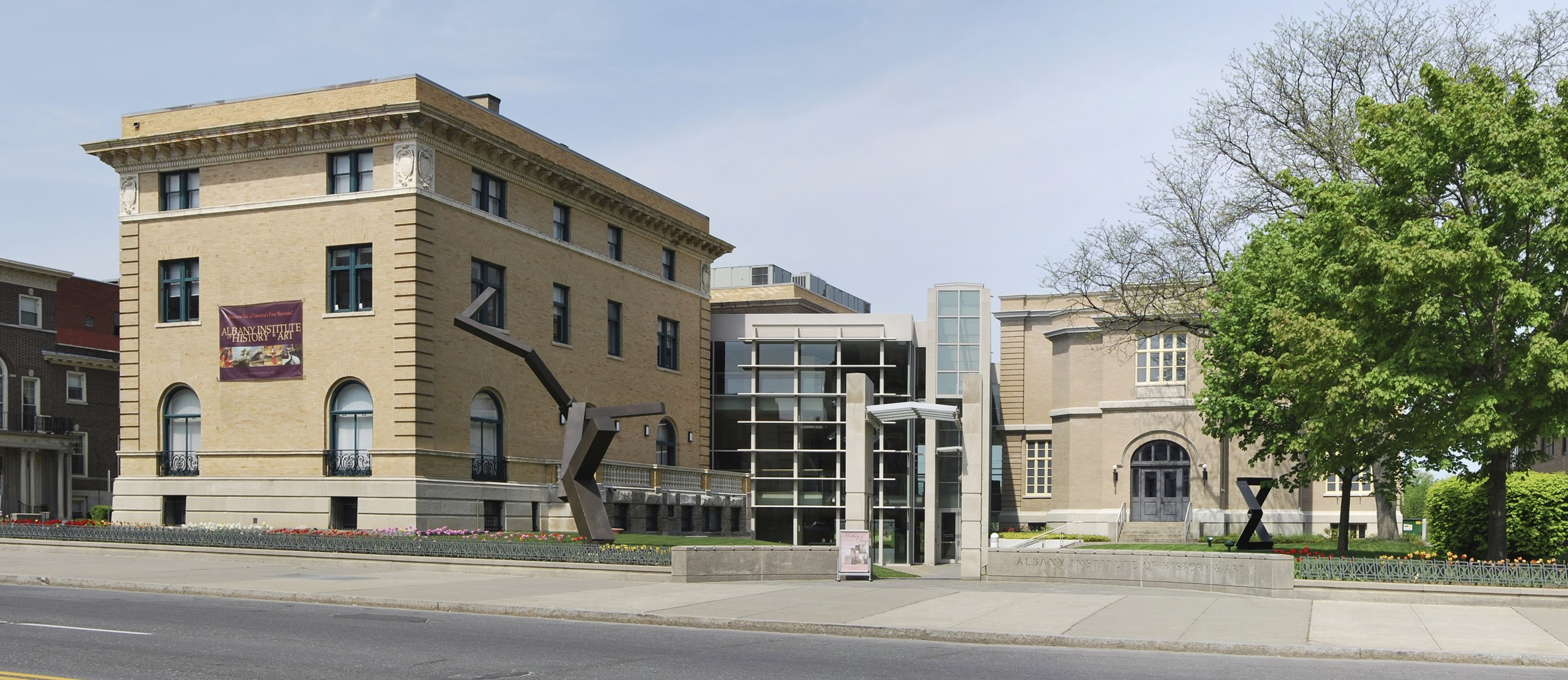
The Albany Institute of History and Art in Albany

Albany consistently ranks high on lists of top cities/metro areas for culture, such as being 23rd in the book Cities Ranked & Rated. Albany ranked 12th among large metro areas and Glens Falls ranked 12th among the small metro areas in Sperling's Best Places; and Expansion Management (a monthly business magazine) gave the Albany-Schenectady-Troy area five Stars, its highest ranking, for quality of life features. The Capital District has many museums, historical sites, art galleries, and festivals that stretch back to the 17th century. The Capital District has been pivotal in the history of Santa Claus in the United States, including the first written reference to Santa (Sinterclaas) in 1675 and the first publishing of 'Twas the Night before Christmas in 1823.

=== Cuisine ===
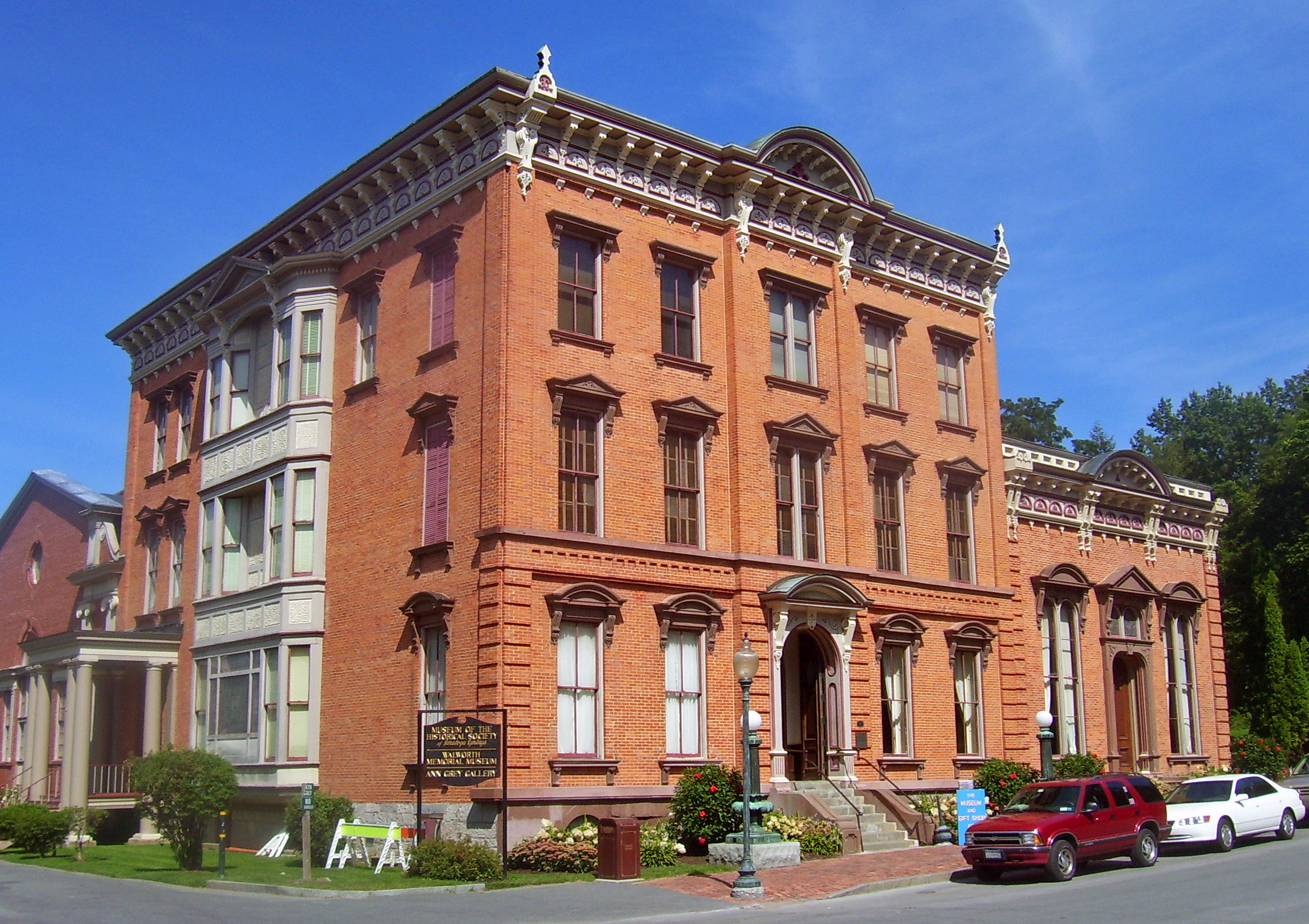
The Canfield Casino, home of the first club sandwich in 1894

The Capital District has been the birthplace of several important foods in American food culture. Potato chips were invented by African-American/Native American chef George Crum, at the Moon Lake Lodge's restaurant in Saratoga Springs. The club sandwich was also invented in Saratoga Springs, at the Saratoga Club-house, today the Canfield Casino, in 1894. Pie à la Mode was first made at the Cambridge Hotel in Cambridge, Washington County in the 1890s. Mozzarella sticks with melba (a raspberry sauce) is a popular dish originating from the Capital District, in the Albany area in particular.

Sturgeon in the Hudson River was once so plentiful that the fish was referred to as "Albany beef".

=== Festivals ===
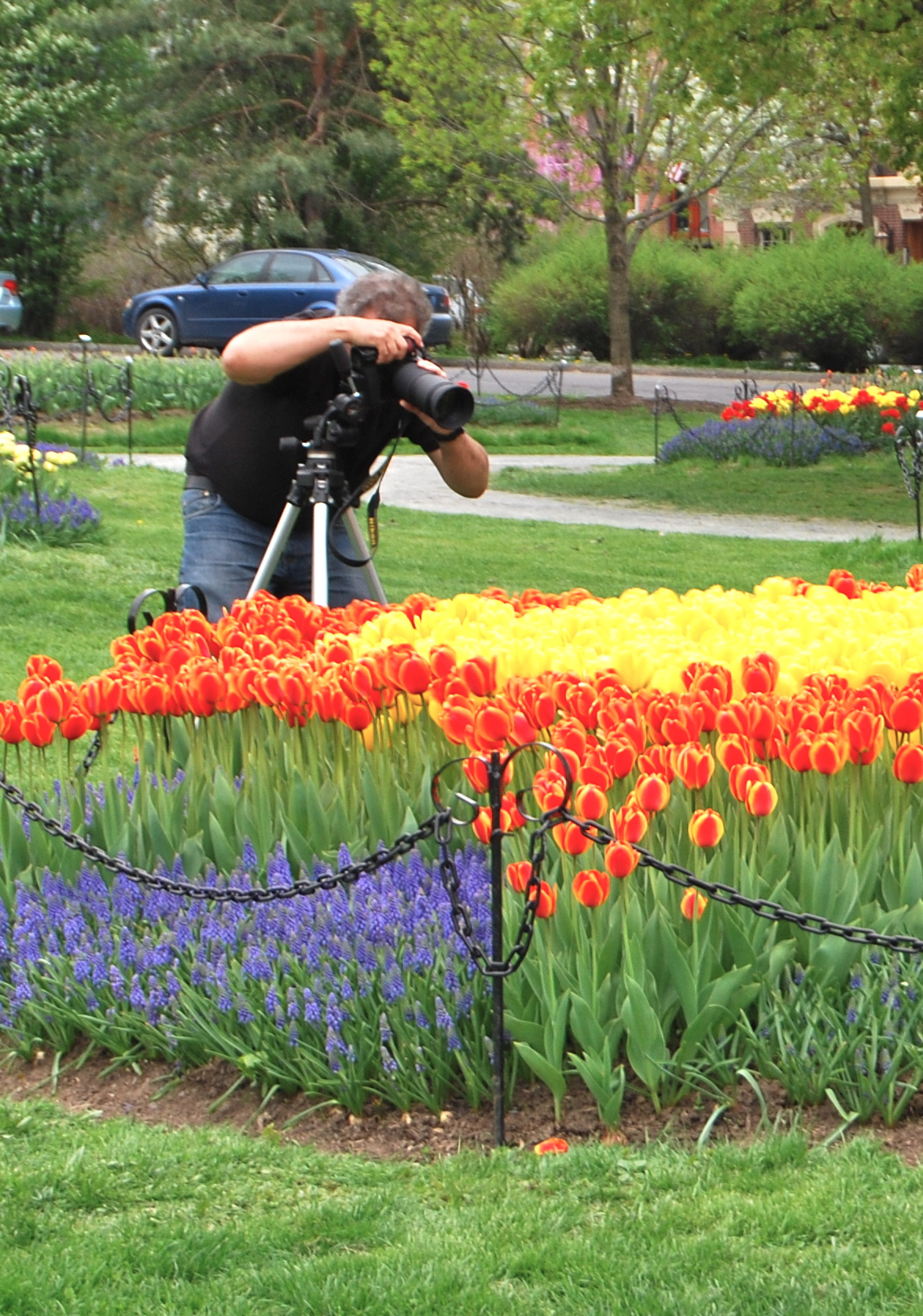
A photographer taking in the floral scene at the Tulip Fest, 2009

One of the largest events in the Capital District is the Tulip Fest held in Albany every spring at Washington Park. The tradition stems from when Mayor Erastus Corning 2nd got a city ordinance passed declaring the tulip as Albany's official flower on July 1, 1948. In addition, he sent a request to Queen Wilhelmina of the Netherlands to name a variety as Albany's tulip. On July 11, 1948, her reply was "Her Majesty gladly accepts the invitation to designate a tulip as the official flower of Albany." She picked the variety "Orange Wonder", a bronzy orange shaded scarlet. The first Tulip Fest was celebrated the next year on May 14, 1949, with opening ceremonies still carried on today as tradition, such as the sweeping of State Street and the crowning of a Tulip Queen. The African-American tradition of Pinksterfest, whose origins are traced back even further to Dutch festivities, was later incorporated into the Tulip Fest. Attendance to the festival in 2010 was approximately 80,000.

Another large festival in Albany is the Capital Pride Parade and Festival, a major gay pride event held each June, attended by an estimated 30,000 spectators annually from across Upstate New York.

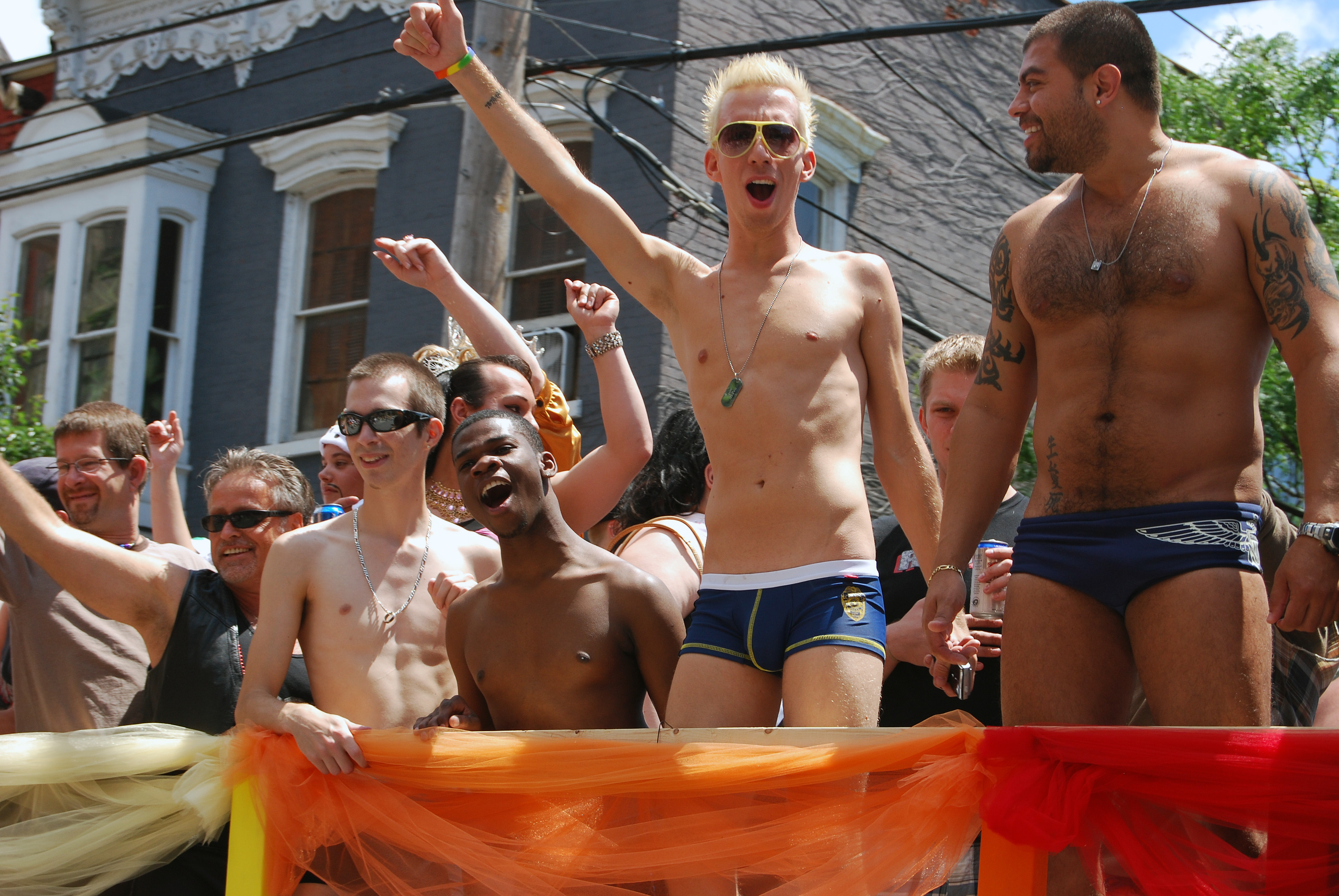
The Capital Gay Pride Parade and Festival is the largest celebration of LGBTQ culture in Upstate New York.

The largest Flag Day parade in the United States had been held every year in Troy until 2017. The 42nd annual parade in 2009 is along a two-mile (3 km) long route. First Night celebrations are held in Saratoga Springs, while in 2006 Albany decided to eliminate its First Night celebrations in favor of a new "Albany WinterFestival" (WinterFest).

Other major festivals in the Capital District include ethnic festivals. The Albany LatinFest, which has been held since 1996, drew 10,000 people to Washington Park in 2008. In Schenectady the growing Guyanese community has celebrated the Guyanese Family Fun Day for several years in that city's Central Park. PolishFest is a three-day celebration of Polish culture in the Capital District, held in the town of Colonie for the past eight years.

=== Entertainment ===
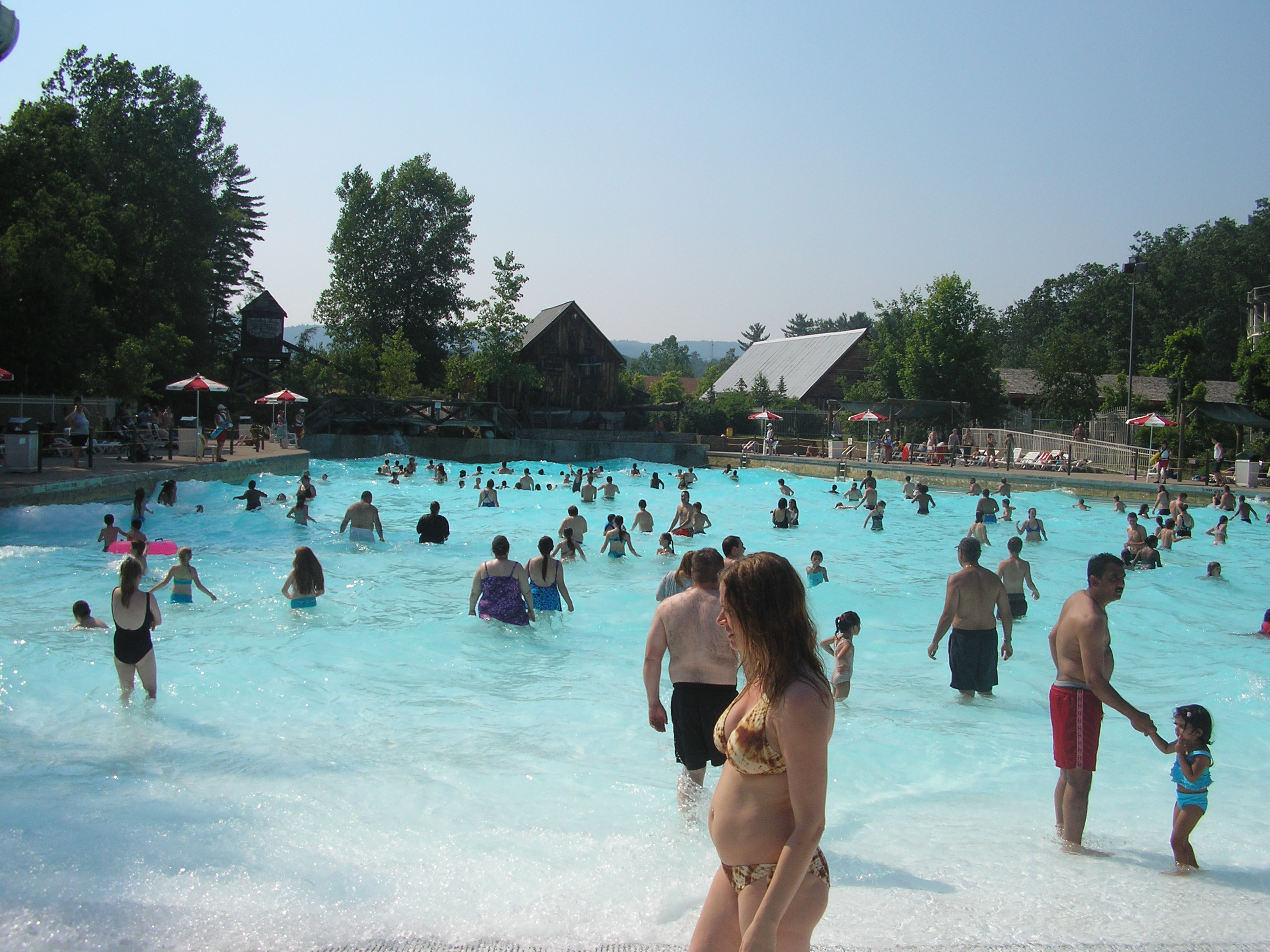
Hurricane Bay wave pool at Six Flags Great Escape

The Capital District has many enclosed malls that are regional malls (malls over 400,000 sq ft (37,000 m^{2})), and two that are classified as super-regional malls (malls with over 800,000 sq ft (74,000 m^{2})). Crossgates Mall in Guilderland and Colonie Center in Colonie are the two super-regional malls.reloc

=== Sports ===
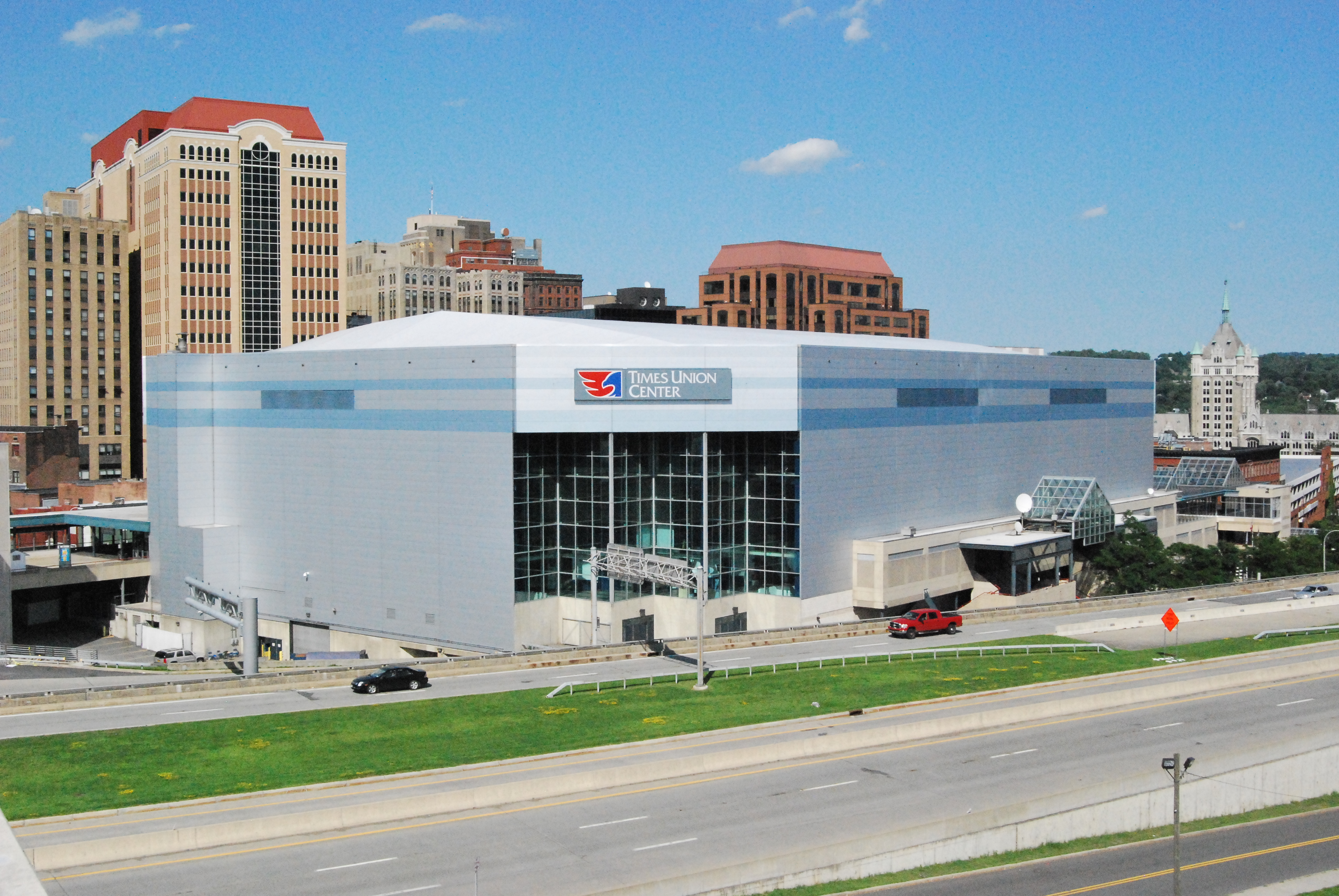
The MVP Arena in Albany, the largest sporting and concert venue in the Capital District

Since 1988, the Siena College men's basketball team (the Siena Saints) have appeared in sevenNCAA Tournaments (1989, 1999, 2002, 2008, 2009, and 2010), while their crosstown rivals, the Great Danes of the University at Albany (SUNY) have appeared five times 2006, 2007, 2013, 2014, 2015, and 2015.

Union College won the NCAA Division 1 National Championship in 2014 in men's college hockey, while its rival, RPI, brought home the title in 1985 and 1954.

==== Professional sports teams ====
- Albany Empire (Arena Football League)
- Albany Legends (International Basketball League)
- Tri-City ValleyCats (Frontier League, independent baseball league; 2010, 2013, 2018 New York–Penn League Champions)
- New York Buzz (World Team Tennis)

== Transportation ==
Albany has long been at the forefront of transportation technology from the days of turnpikes and plank roads to the Erie Canal, from the first passenger railroad in the state to the oldest municipal airport in the nation. Today, Interstates, Amtrak, and the Albany International Airport continue to make the Capital District a major crossroads of the Northeastern United States.

=== Interstate and other major highways ===
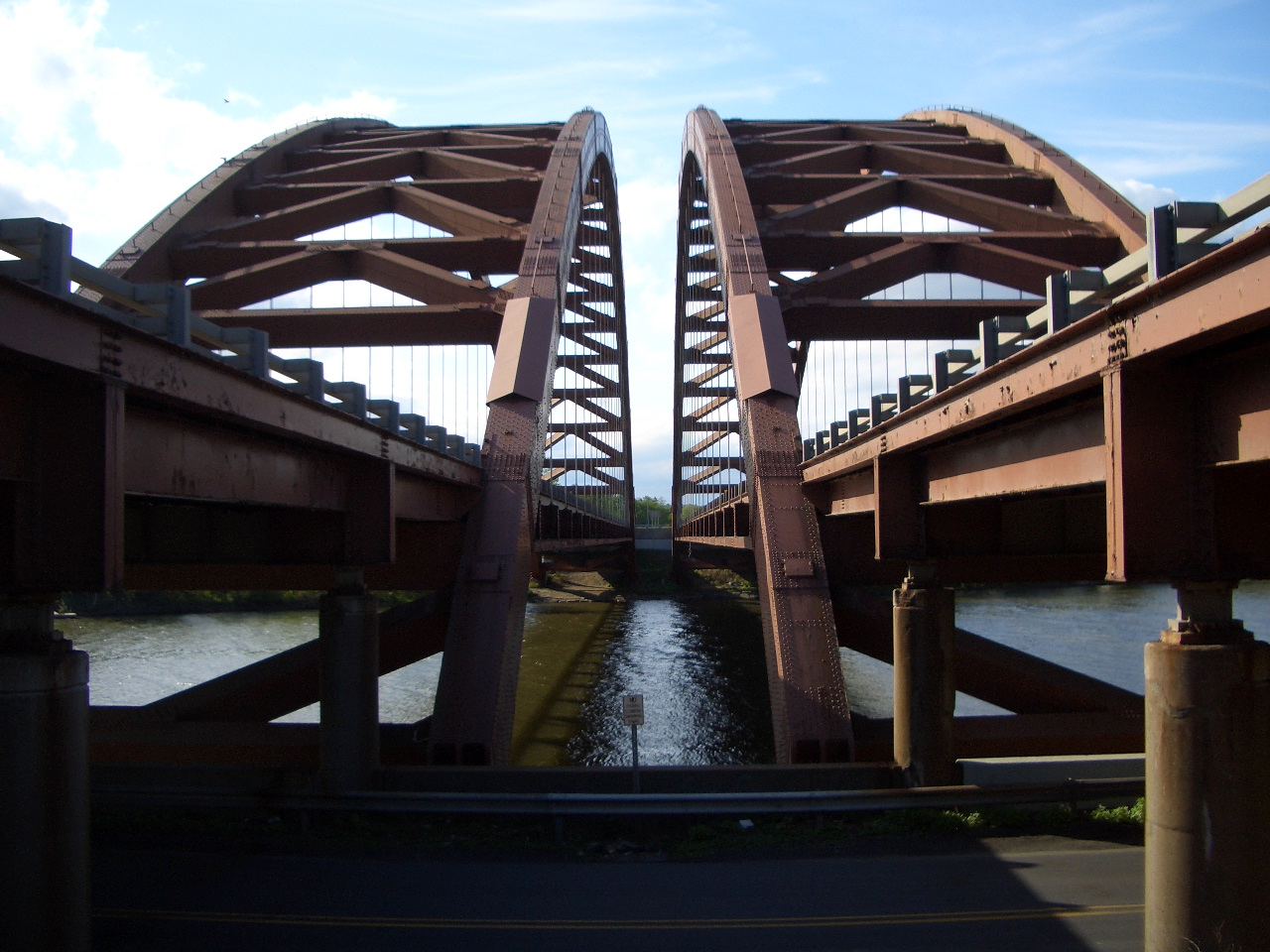
The Thaddeus Kosciusko Bridge carries Interstate 87 between Saratoga and Albany counties.

East-west Interstate 90 (I-90) and north–south Interstate 87 (I-87) meet at Exit 24 of the Thomas E. Dewey New York State Thruway in the Capital District. Exit 24 is the busiest exit on the Thruway. I-87 parallels the much older US Route 9W south of Albany and US Route 9 north and I-90 parallels New York State Route 5 west from Albany; all three highways are still important for local and regional traffic despite the proximity of the Interstates.

=== Mass transit ===
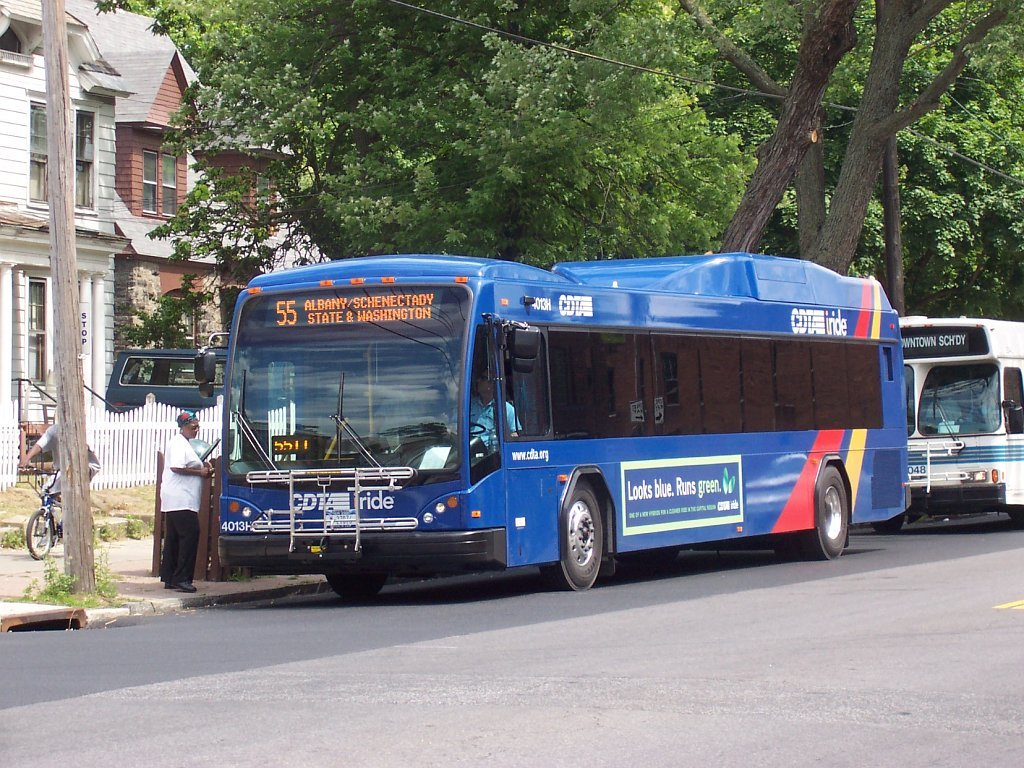
CDTA Gillig hybrid bus, in Schenectady, with iRide branding

The four core counties of the Capital District are served by buses of the Capital District Transportation Authority, which has transit hubs in the three principal cities of Albany, Schenectady, and Troy. There is also express bus service between Saratoga Springs and Albany. The CDTA serves a large part of Albany, Rensselaer, and Schenectady counties. The city of Mechanicville, Saratoga County runs a public transit service on four routes which cover the city and the surrounding suburbs in the towns of Stillwater and Halfmoon in Saratoga County and the hamlet of Hemstreet Park in the town of Schaghticoke, Rensselaer County. CDTA also serves Bolton Landing (May to October), Glens Falls, Hudson Falls, Fort Edward, Lake George, Queensbury, and South Glens Falls. Gloversville Transit System (GTS) serves Gloversville, Johnstown, and Amsterdam.

=== Cities with intercity bus service to outside the region ===
- Albany: Greyhound Lines, Trailways, and Peter Pan Bus Lines buses all serve a downtown terminal. Chinatown bus lines leave from Central Avenue with service to Chinatown, Manhattan.
- Schenectady: Greyhound and Trailways serve a downtown terminal on State Street.
- Glens Falls: Greyhound and Trailways serve a downtown terminal.
- Gloversville: Greyhound and Trailway serve a downtown terminal on West Fulton Street.
- Saratoga Springs: Greyhound
- Rensselaer: Megabus operates regular service from the Albany-Rensselaer Train Station to New York City and Ridgewood, New Jersey

=== Airports ===
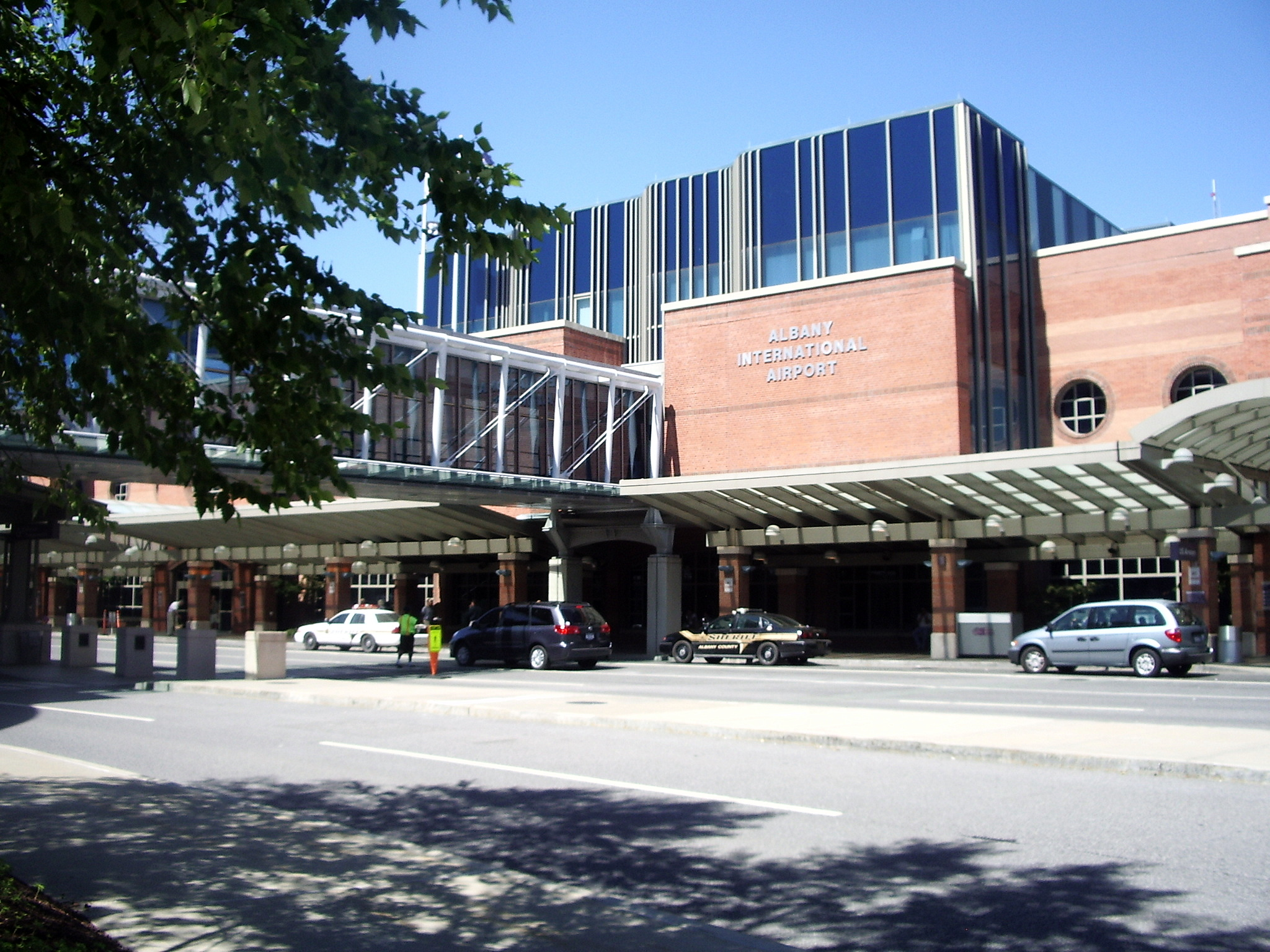
Albany International Airport main entrance

Nine of the 11 counties in the Capital District make up the Upper Hudson Region as defined by the Federal Aviation Administration (FAA). In 1978 the FAA assigned the Capital District Regional Planning Commission to be responsible for this region's aviation system planning and to provide technical assistance. The Upper Hudson Region has 26 airports open to public use, with 13 designated as system airports. Those 13 airports are:

- Albany International Airport in Colonie, Albany County, the only commercial service airport;
- Schenectady County Airport in Glenville, Schenectady County;
- Saratoga County Airport in Milton, Saratoga County;
- Columbia County Airport in Columbia County;
- Fulton County Airport in Johnstown, Fulton County;
- Freehold Airport in Greenville, Greene County;
- South Albany Airport in Bethlehem, Albany County;
- Rensselaer County Airpark in Poestenkill, Rensselaer County;
- Duanesburg Airport in Duanesburg, Schenectady County;
- Burello-Mechanicville Airport in Schaghticoke, Rensselaer County;
- Plateau Sky Ranch in Edinburg, Saratoga County;
- Sharon Airport in Sharon, Schoharie County;
- Maben Airport in Prattsville, Greene County.

=== Rail ===
Amtrak has several routes servicing the stations of the Capital District. The Adirondack (north to Montreal, Quebec and south to the city of New York), Empire Service (west to Buffalo and Niagara Falls, south to New York), Ethan Allen Express (northeast to Burlington, Vermont and south to New York), Maple Leaf (west to Toronto and south to New York), Berkshire Flyer (east to Pittsfield and south to New York), and the Lake Shore Limited (at Albany-Rensselaer separate routes from Boston and New York merge to one train west to Chicago, on way east one train splits to two, one east to Boston another south to New York). Amtrak stations in the region are:

- Albany-Rensselaer station in Rensselaer County
- Schenectady station in Schenectady County
- Saratoga Springs station in Saratoga County
- Fort Edward station in Washington County
- Hudson station in Columbia County
- Amsterdam station in Montgomery County
- Whitehall station in Washington County

Albany-Rensselaer has long been one of Amtrak's major stations. It is the busiest serving a metropolitan area of fewer than 2 million people, mainly due to the large number of passengers traveling to and from New York City.

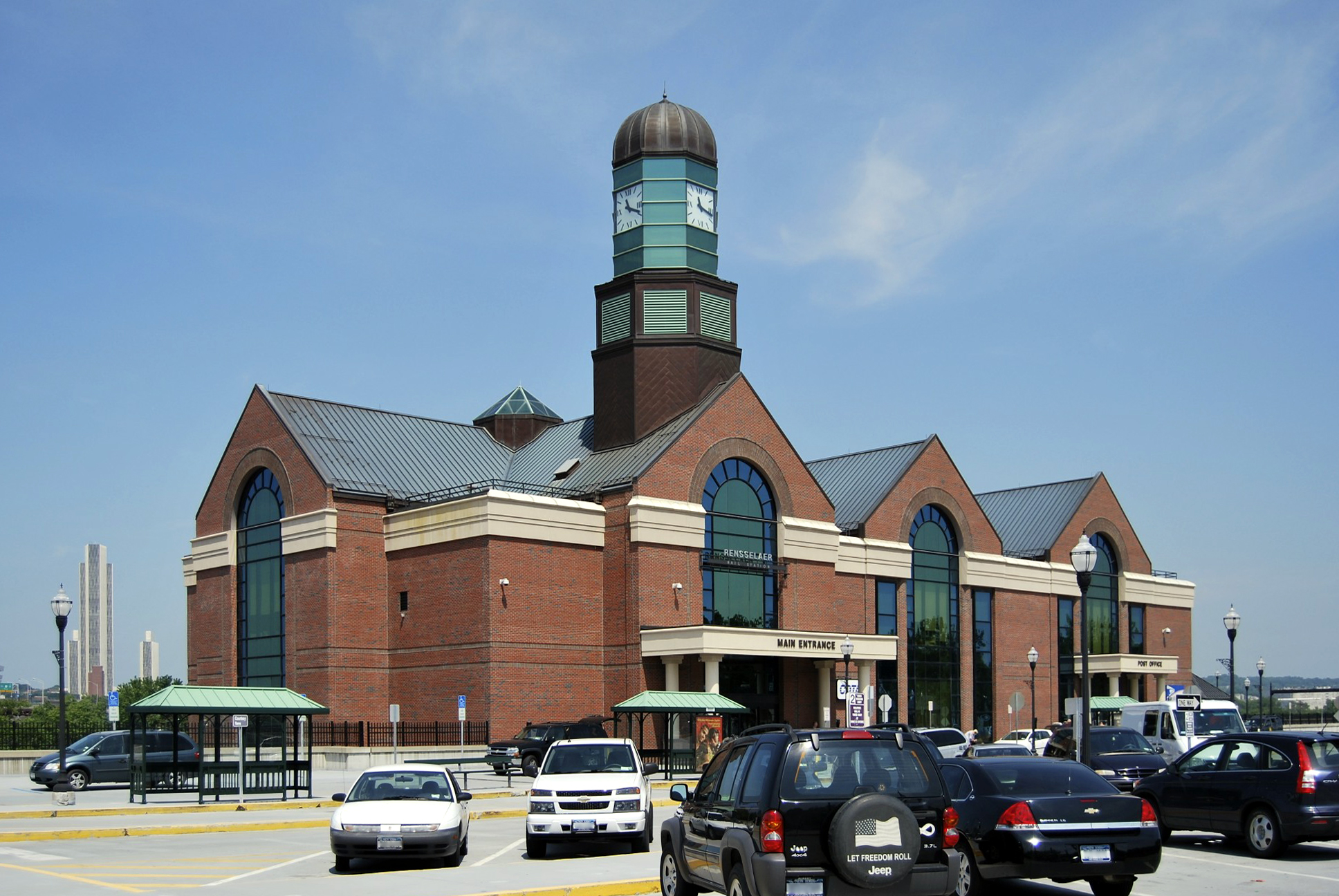
Albany-Rensselaer station

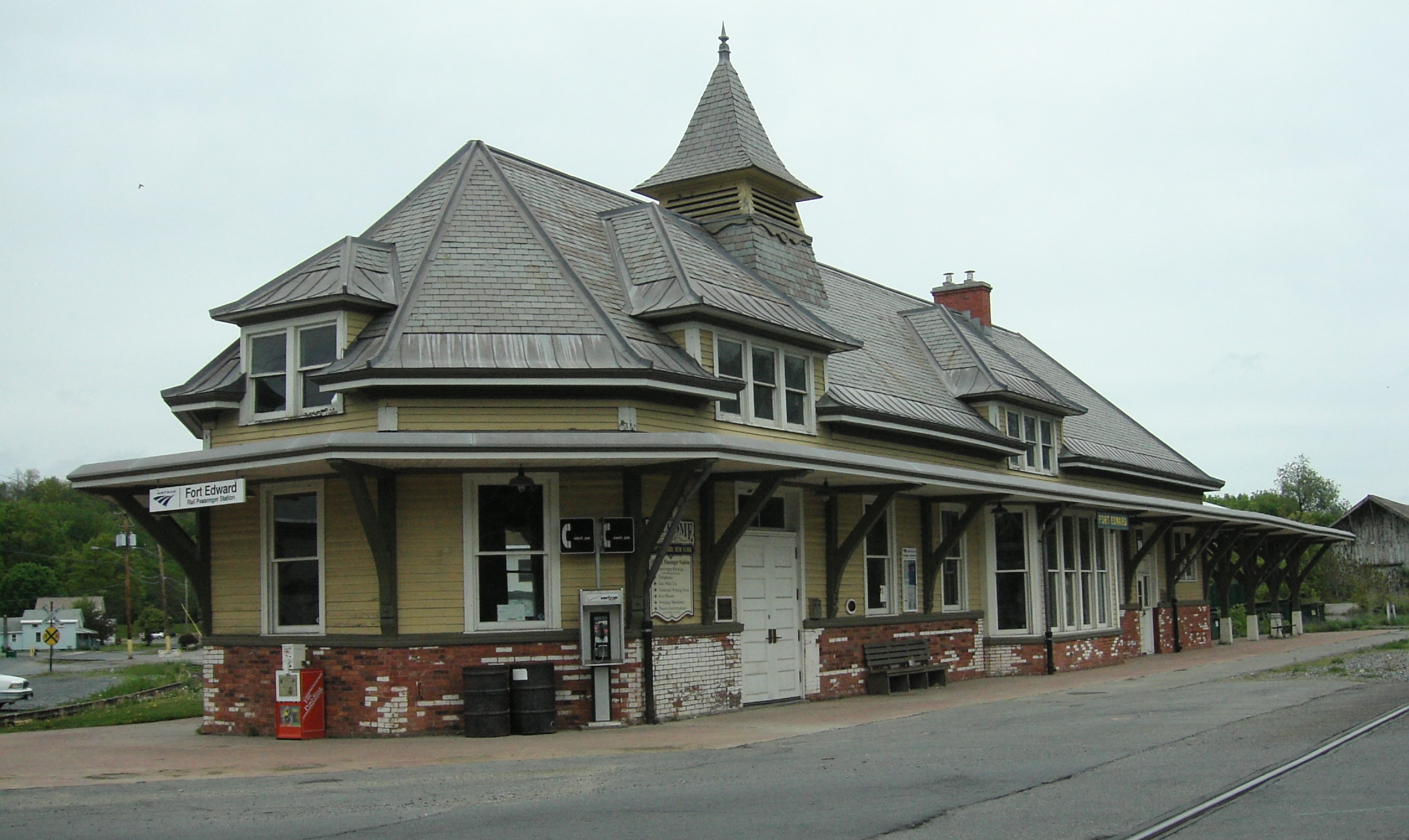
Fort Edward station

== Congressional representation ==
Congressmembers of the Capital District

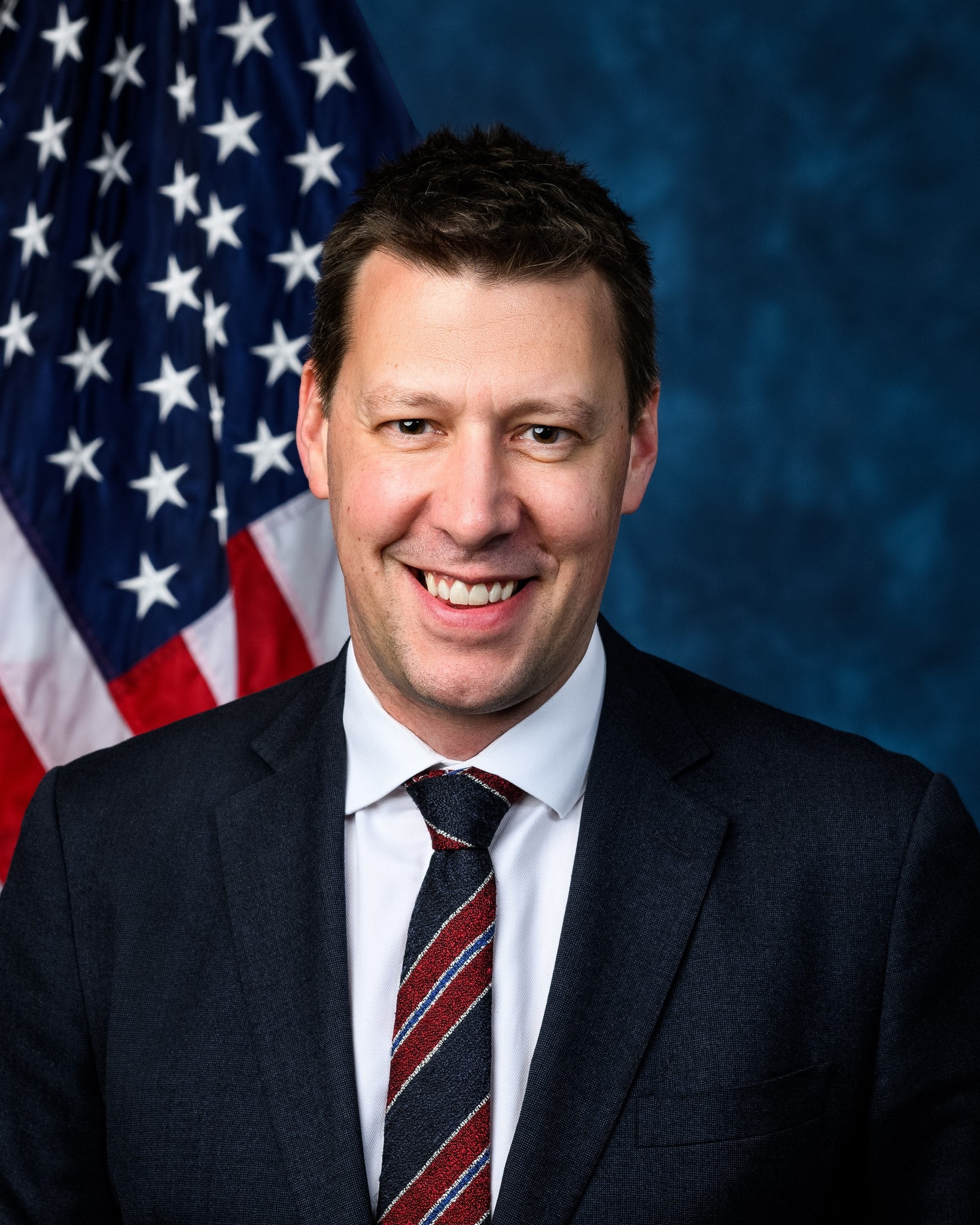
Josh Riley (19th)

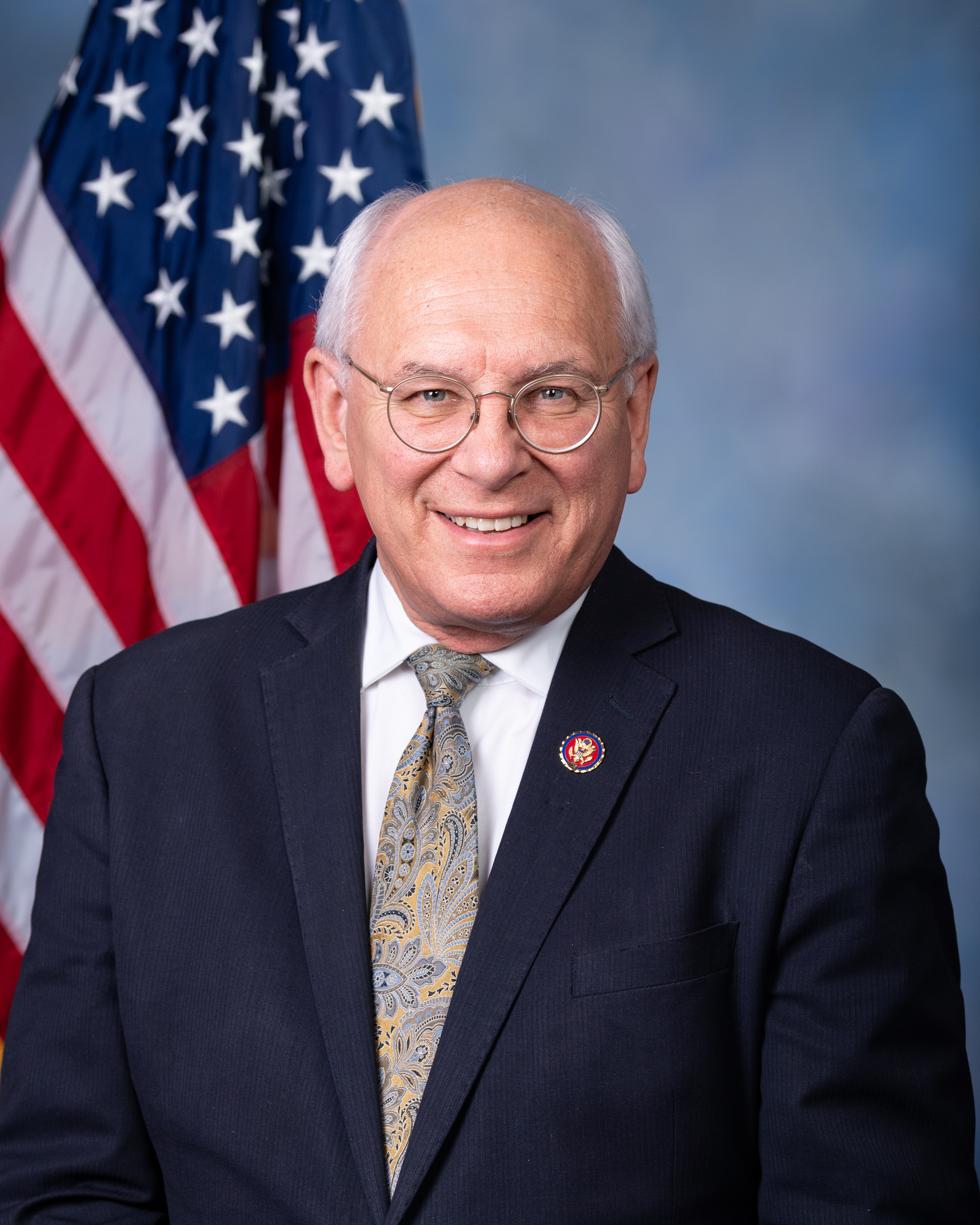
Paul Tonko (20th)

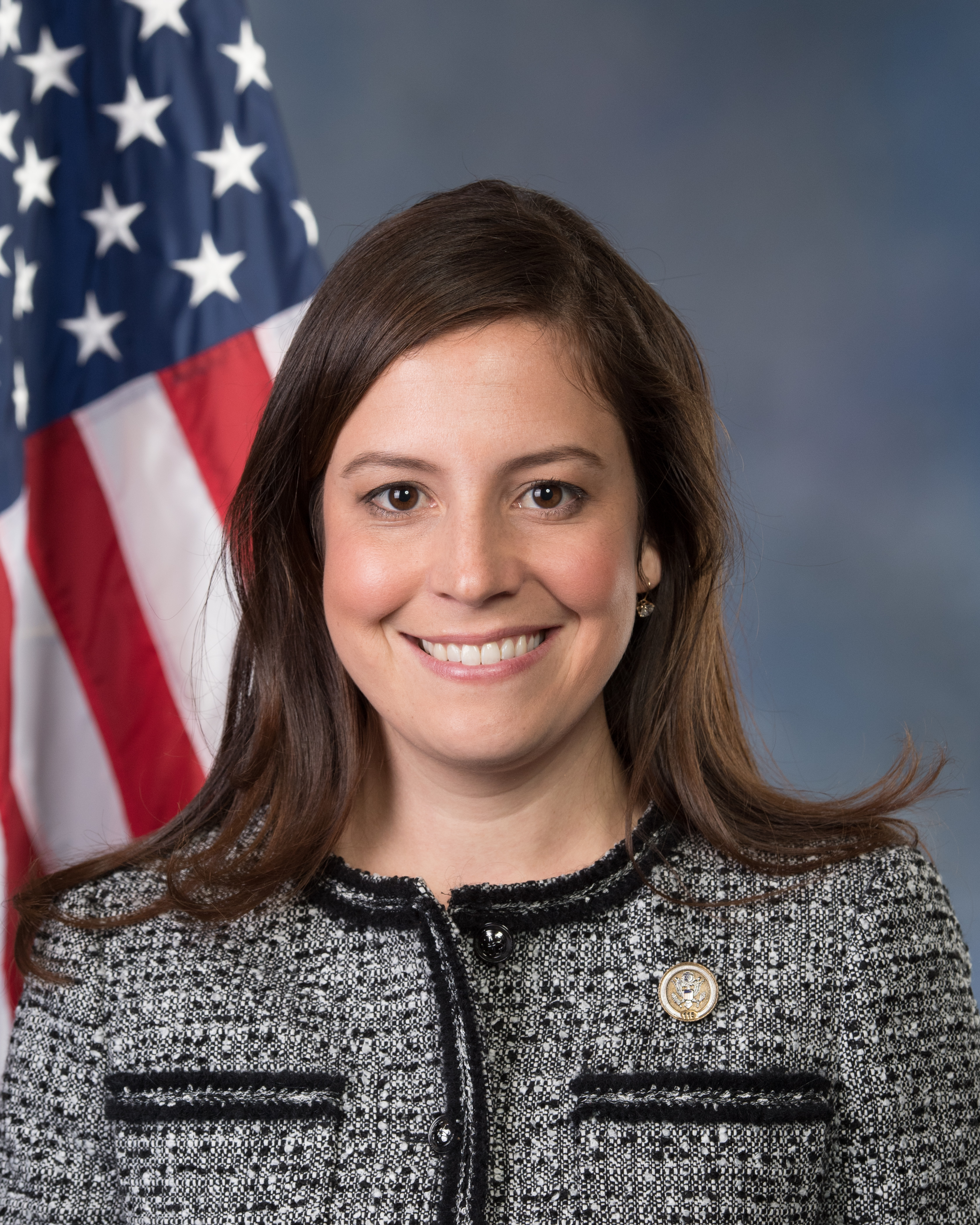
Elise Stefanik (21st)

The Capital District contains portions of three congressional districts: New York's 19th, 20th, and 21st congressional districts. As of 2023, those three districts are represented by Josh Riley (D) (19th district), Paul Tonko (D) (20th district) and Elise Stefanik (R) (21st district), respectively.
