= Cohoes Commons =

Coordinates: 42.7762°N 73.6994°W

- Location: Cohoes, New York
- Opened: August 1, 1987
- Closed: C. 2009
- Developer: Zandri Construction Co. of Cohoes
- Owner: National Enterprises
- Num. of stores: 16
- Num. of anchor tenants: 1
- Floor area: 120,000 sq ft (11,000 m^{2})
- Floors: 2

Cohoes Commons was a small, urban enclosed shopping mall in Cohoes, New York, mostly focusing on upscale fashion outlet stores. The building is primarily an office complex. It is located on Mohawk Street.

== History ==
=== Development ===
Plans for development of the mall were announced in Summer, 1986. A mall would be built as an addition to the existing Cohoes Specialty Stores, which would serve as the anchor. The plan was to build 56,000 square feet (5,200 m^{2}) of additional retail space in a two-story building. The intent was to feature stores not found in the larger, suburban malls in the New York Capital Region. Ground breaking was scheduled for October 1, 1986. The cost of the mall was $4 million. Construction was done by Zandri Construction Co. of Cohoes. It was claimed that people came to Cohoes Specialty Stores and wanted to see other shops in close proximity.

At the time, Cohoes had a downtown with businesses catering to cost-conscious customers. It was felt among the community in that area, that the kinds of traffic coming to the mall would not spill over into the business area. Parking concerns were also cited because this mall did not have acres of parking spaces like the typical suburban mall.

=== Opening ===
The mall was scheduled to open on August 1, 1987. Total retail space was 75,000 square feet (7,000 m^{2}) in addition to its anchor. As a result of the mall's development, Cohoes Specialty Stores opened Cohoes Too in 1987, which sold clearance items from all stores in the Cohoes Specialty Stores chain, across the street in the building formerly housed by Dansk. Dansk moved into the mall as an original tenant.

By 1989, New York State Route 787, an arterial expanding I-787, had been completed, connecting Cohoes with the interstate. This brought more people into the area. It was noted that busloads of people were arriving in Cohoes on Saturdays, prompting consideration of a Harmony Mall in the old Harmony Mills No. 2 building. This building had served as a knitting mill in 1866.

=== Early years ===
The Cohoes Specialty Stores chain owned 50% of the Cohoes Commons building. When Burlington Coat Factory purchased the chain in 1989, they took the 50% ownership in the building.

By 1993, the partnership that operated the mall (including Cohoes Fashions, then owned by Burlington Coat Factory, as a limited partner) was the Mohawk Group based in Manhattan. In 1987, Mohawk Group purchased the mall from Cohoes Specialty Stores, Ltd. The mortgage holder in 1993 was First International Bank of California. The bank filed foreclosure papers by mid-1993 due to failure to pay the $44,000 monthly payment.

By the end of 1995, the mall was transferred to National Enterprises of California from the Mohawk Group to avoid foreclosure.

=== Decline ===
The Cohoes Specialty Stores chain was underwater in debt, and was sold by mid-1989. The chain's flagship and anchor store at Cohoes Commons was temporarily closed (June 2 to June 18, 1989) and others in the chain were permanently shuttered. Ultimately, Burlington Coat Factory bought the chain in a bankruptcy sale. The mall itself did well after this time, but stores continued to relocate over the years. By 1995, the mall had a 68% vacancy rate. New owners were attempting to turn it around to return it to the upscale shopping center of the late 1980s.

By late 1995, the only remaining tenants included Cohoes Fashions, L'eggs/Bali/Hanes, Labels, Polo/Ralph Lauren, Prestige Fragrances, and Labels. The new owners planned renovations to include skylights and other items to make the mall seem more upscale.

Cohoes Fashions announced in April, 1999, that it would be relocating to Crossgates Mall. In the subsequent months, Polo/Ralph Lauren announced its departure from the mall along with another boutique. In October, 1999, the anchor Cohoes Fashions was finishing its store liquidation sale in preparation for its new location at Crossgates Mall. By January, 2000, it was noted in the Albany Times Union that Cohoes Commons was "largely empty." Like many other, larger malls, loss of the anchor caused traffic to dwindle and a chain reaction of smaller stores leaving. The size of the mall (under 200,000 sq ft (19,000 m^{2})) made it difficult to attract new retail tenants.

=== Closure and redevelopment ===
The mall was converted into an office complex occupied by Seton Health and later a unit of the New York State Department of Civil Service.
