= Colonie Center =

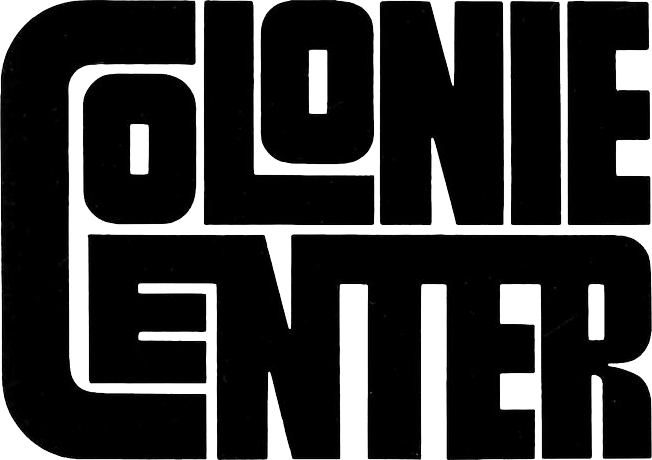

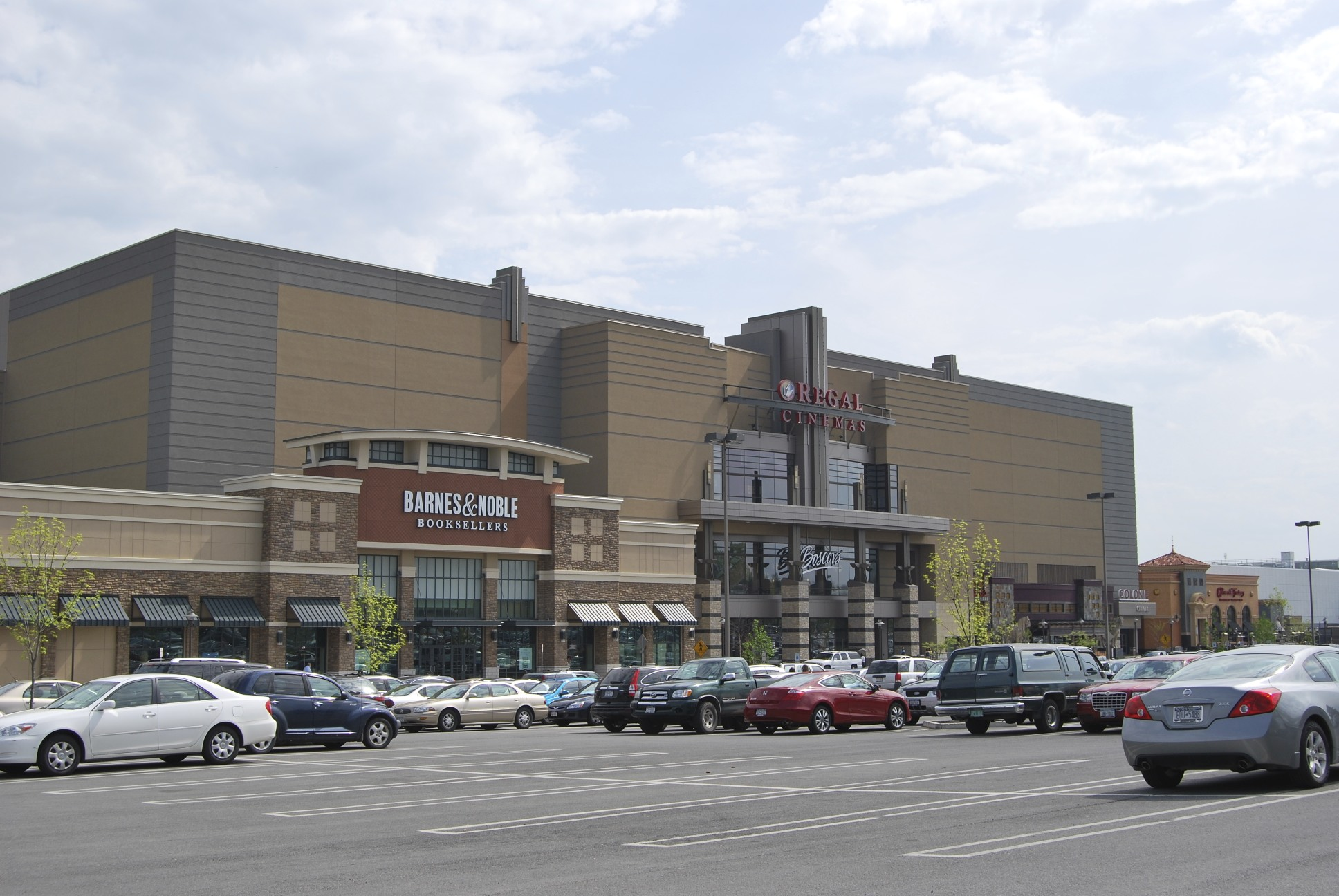
- Location: Roessleville, New York, United States
- Coordinates: 42°42′36″N 73°48′58″W
- Opened: November 1, 1966
- Developer: Homart Development Company
- Owner: Colonie Pacific
- Architect: Victor Gruen Associates
- Num. of stores: 110
- Num. of anchor tenants: 6
- Floor area: 1,340,610 sq ft (124,547 m^{2})
- Floors: 2 (3 in Boscov's, Macy's, and Regal Cinemas)
- Public transit: CDTA bus: 1, 117, 125, 190, 355, 905
- Website: shopatcoloniecenter.com

Colonie Center is a shopping mall located in Roessleville, New York, a suburb of Albany, at the intersection of Central Avenue, Wolf Road, and Interstate 87. Opening in 1966, it was the first enclosed shopping mall in New York's Capital Region. The two-story mall has an area of 1,340,610 square feet (124,547 m^{2}) and 110 stores as well as a food court. In April 2013, the shopping center was sold to KKR in partnership with Colonie Pacific. On July 9, 2021, KKR sold its stake.

The mall features the traditional retailers Macy's, Boscov's, L.L. Bean, Barnes & Noble, Whole Foods Market, in addition to a 13-screen, stadium-seating, Regal Cinemas & RPX. Previously, the mall housed a Christmas Tree Shops, which closed in 2023.

By 2019, the original Sears auto center had been reconstructed for both BJ's Restaurants and Ethan Allen. In August 2017, Sears announced it would shutter as part of an ongoing decision to eliminate its traditional brick-and-mortar format. A number of potential replacement tenants have reportedly been in the midst of early on discussions with property owner and developmental arm Seritage Growth Properties. According the recent rumours, there have been reports of a Crate & Barrel or Saks OFF 5th, filling in for CTS (Christmas Tree Shops)

On June 29, 2023, it was announced Christmas Tree Shops would be shuttering after finding itself unable to satisfy their long-term established debt due to ongoing supply chain shortages.

On July 5, 2023, it was announced that Sierra and Floor & Decor would both be dividing and reconstructing the space which originally had been Sears.
