= Roessleville, New York =

- Hamlet and CDP
- Location within New York Location within the United States
- Coordinates: 42°41′42″N 73°48′27″W
- Country: United States
- State: New York
- Region: Capital District
- County: Albany
- Town: Colonie
- Settled: 1840
- Named for: Theophilus Roessle

Area
  - Total: 2.89 sq mi (7.5 km^{2})
  - Land: 2.88 sq mi (7.5 km^{2})
  - Water: 0.01 sq mi (0.026 km^{2})
- Elevation: 243 ft (74 m)

Population (2020)
  - Total: 11,518
  - Density: 4,000/sq mi (1,540/km^{2})
- Time zone: UTC-5 (EST)
  - Summer (DST): UTC-4 (EDT)
- ZIP Codes: 12205 (Roessleville); 12211 (Loudonville)
- Area code: 518

Roessleville is a hamlet in the town of Colonie, Albany County, New York, United States. It is a densely settled suburb of the city of Albany, along New York State Route 5. Roessleville was a census-designated place in the 1990 Census, but was deleted in 2000, but became a CDP again in 2020.

== History ==
Roessleville was originally of the Pine Bush pine barrens that stretched from Albany to Schenectady; the land later became farmland in the 1940s, then more recently transformed into a densely packed suburb. Roessleville is named for Theophilus Roessle, a German immigrant from the Kingdom of Württemberg, who built one of the most elegant mansions in the Albany area in what is now Roessleville; today's Elmhurst Avenue was once his gated driveway. Two of the most famous residents of Roessleville was Josiah and Elizabeth Stanford; parents of Governor of California Leland Stanford; who moved the entire family here in 1840 and owned the Elm Grove Farm and hotel.

== Geography ==
Roessleville is that section of the town of Colonie between Osborne and Wolf roads, it is bisected by Central Avenue (NY Route 5). The Albany city line is along its southeastern border, the village of Colonie is along its northwestern boundary at Wolf Road. The census-designated place of Roessleville, as defined by the US Census Bureau for 1990, was 2.9 square miles (7.5 km^{2}) in area.

== Demographics ==
Historical population
Census	Pop.	Note	%±
1970	5,476		—
1980	11,685		113.4%
1990	10,753		−8.0%
2020	11,518		—

Since hamlets are by definition ill-defined any attempt at accurate calculations of population related statistics will be difficult or inaccurate. As a census-designated place (CDP) prior to 2000 however Roessleville did have definitive boundaries, though they did change over time from one census to another. Roessleville was not a CDP in 1960, but was in 1970 when it had 5,476 persons which included 125 in a small slice of the town of Guilderland; the Guilderland section was not included in 1980, and in 1990 Roessleville had a population of 10,753.

=== 2020 census ===
As of the 2020 census, Roessleville had a population of 11,518. The median age was 43.6 years. 17.4% of residents were under the age of 18 and 19.9% of residents were 65 years of age or older. For every 100 females there were 92.5 males, and for every 100 females age 18 and over there were 91.3 males age 18 and over.

100.0% of residents lived in urban areas, while 0.0% lived in rural areas.

There were 5,142 households in Roessleville, of which 23.4% had children under the age of 18 living in them. Of all households, 39.0% were married-couple households, 22.2% were households with a male householder and no spouse or partner present, and 31.0% were households with a female householder and no spouse or partner present. About 35.2% of all households were made up of individuals and 14.3% had someone living alone who was 65 years of age or older.

There were 5,460 housing units, of which 5.8% were vacant. The homeowner vacancy rate was 0.6% and the rental vacancy rate was 6.0%.

Racial composition as of the 2020 census
Race	Number	Percent
White	8,289	72.0%
Black or African American	990	8.6%
American Indian and Alaska Native	30	0.3%
Asian	1,125	9.8%
Native Hawaiian and Other Pacific Islander	0	0.0%
Some other race	295	2.6%
Two or more races	789	6.9%
Hispanic or Latino (of any race)	770	6.7%
