= Wilton Mall =

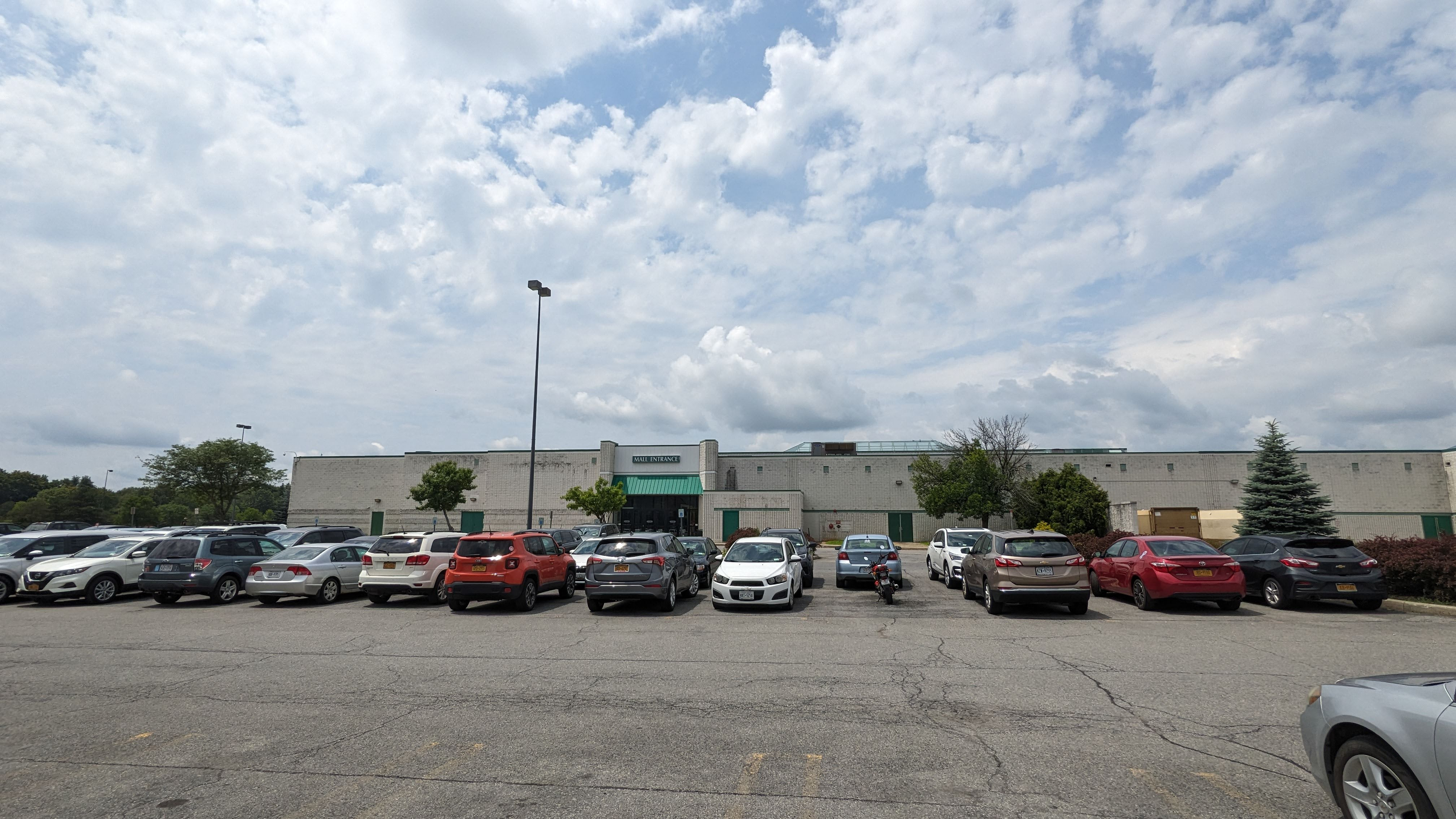
- Exterior of Wilton Mall
- Location: Wilton, New York, United States
- Coordinates: 43.10221°N 73.7375°W
- Address: 3065 NY Route 50
- Opened: 1990
- Developer: Wilmorite Properties
- Manager: Faraz Khan
- Owner: Faraz Khan
- Num. of stores: 70
- Num. of anchor tenants: 5
- Floor area: 708,000 sq ft (65,800 m^{2})
- Floors: 1
- Public transit: 450, 452
- Website: wiltonmall.com

Wilton Mall is a regional shopping center, located off Interstate 87 exit 15 in the town of Wilton, directly north of Saratoga Springs, New York. The mall features anchor stores JCPenney, Dick's Sporting Goods, HomeGoods, Planet Fitness and Healthy Living Market.

The mall has a gross leasable area of 708,000 square feet (65,800 m^{2}). It was owned Macerich until 2025, having been purchased from Wilmorite Properties of Rochester, New York in 2004. The mall was sold to Faraz Khan, who owns Clifton Park Center in April 2025.

The dawn of the 2020s saw several storied traditional department store retailers update its brick-and-mortar formats after being encroached upon to a degree by several digital retailers in recent years

In August 2018, it was announced department store retailer The Bon-Ton would be shuttering after it was unable to elect any new conditions to satisfy its established long-term debt. As of February 2023, the previous The Bon-Ton outpost is in the approval stages to become townhouses and 400 luxury apartments.

In 2018, it was revealed Saratoga Hospital would be reconstructing Sears after it had announced to shutter as part of an ongoing decision to phase out of their traditional brick-and-mortar format.

In March 2022, Macerich, the mall development firm, unveiled its plan for a future enhanced development with up to 400 luxury apartments as well as townhomes, something it has done at its malls before including Tysons Corner Center. The developers desire to add many additional features such as a theater, art gallery, microbreweries, distilleries, row houses, an indoor pool, cocktail lounges, and even laboratories and research centers.
