= Rochester metropolitan area, New York =

Rochester metropolitan area
- Metropolitan Statistical Area
- Rochester, NY Metropolitan Statistical Area
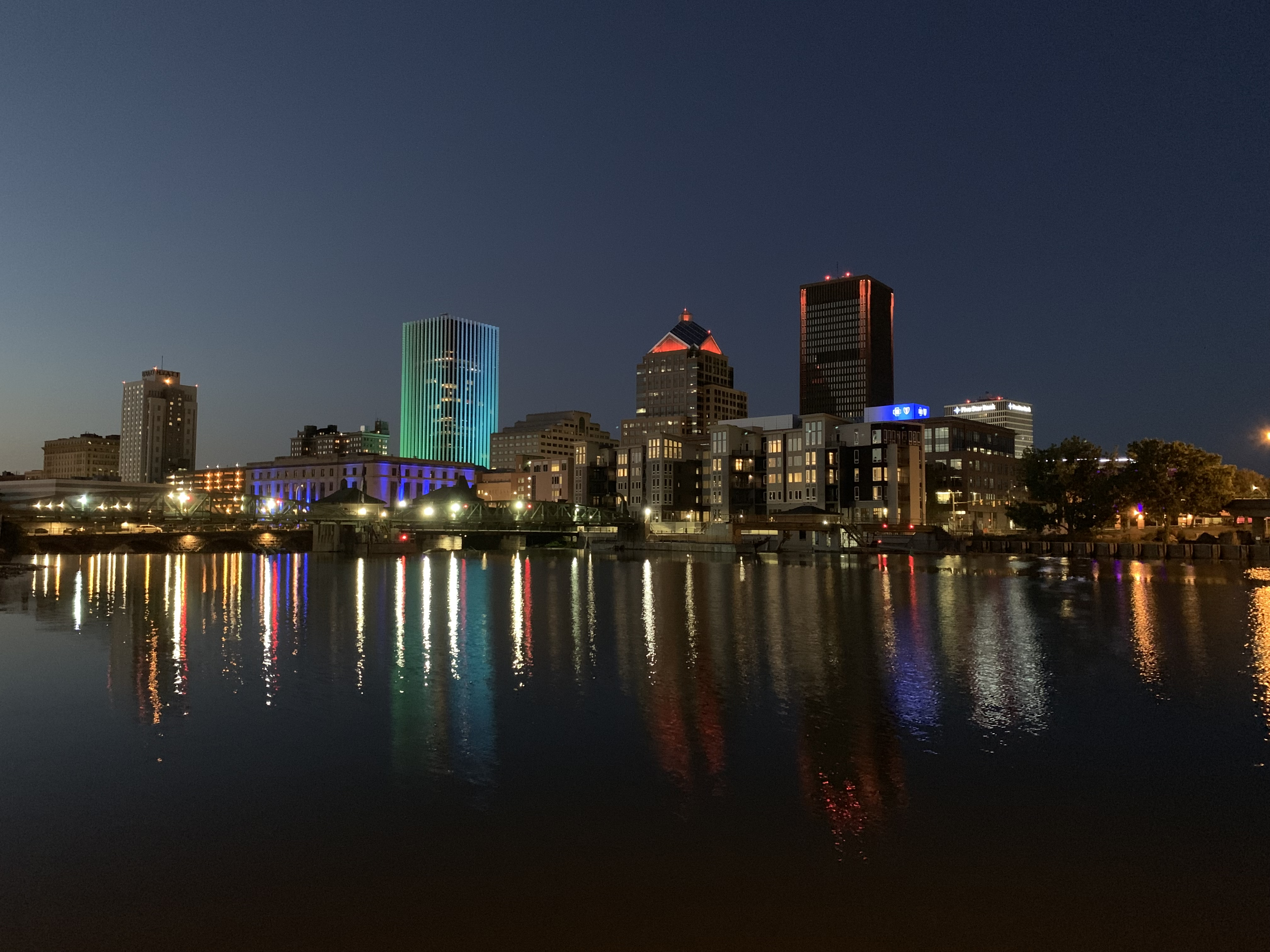
- Skyline of Rochester in 2019
Map of Rochester–Batavia–Seneca Falls, NY CSA
City of Rochester
Rochester MSA
Batavia μSA
Seneca Falls μSA
- Coordinates: 43°08′57″N 77°31′19″W
- Country: United States
- State: New York
- Largest city: Rochester
- Other cities: – Canandaigua – Batavia – Geneva

Area
  - Total: 2,930 sq mi (7,600 km^{2})

Population (2020)
  - Total: 1,090,135
  - Estimate (2025): 1,056,149 ▼
  - Rank: 54th in the U.S. ▼
  - Density: 360/sq mi (139/km^{2})

GDP
  - MSA: $75.085 billion (2022)
- Time zone: UTC-5 (EST)
  - Summer (DST): UTC-4 (DST)
- Area codes: 585, 315/680

The Rochester metropolitan area, denoted the Rochester, NY Metropolitan Statistical Area by the United States Census Bureau, is a metropolitan statistical area consisting of six counties in Western New York, anchored by the city of Rochester, New York. Many counties are mainly rural with various farming communities scattered throughout the metropolitan area. As of the 2025 census estimates, the MSA had a population of 1,056,149. The Rochester MSA is the 3rd largest MSA in New York state.

== Counties ==
=== Metropolitan area ===
| County | Seat | 2025 Estimate | 2020 Census | Change | Land Area | Density |
|---|---|---|---|---|---|---|
| Monroe | Rochester | 750,506 | 759,443 | −1.18% | 657 sq mi (1,700 km^{2}) | 1,142/sq mi (441/km^{2}) |
| Ontario | Canandaigua | 113,130 | 112,458 | +0.60% | 644 sq mi (1,670 km^{2}) | 176/sq mi (68/km^{2}) |
| Wayne | Lyons | 91,250 | 91,283 | −0.04% | 604 sq mi (1,560 km^{2}) | 151/sq mi (58/km^{2}) |
| Livingston | Geneseo | 61,438 | 61,834 | −0.64% | 632 sq mi (1,640 km^{2}) | 97/sq mi (38/km^{2}) |
| Orleans | Albion | 39,825 | 40,343 | −1.28% | 391 sq mi (1,010 km^{2}) | 102/sq mi (39/km^{2}) |
| Total | | 1,056,149 | 1,065,361 | −0.86% | 2,928 sq mi (7,580 km^{2}) | 361/sq mi (139/km^{2}) |

== Communities ==
=== Places with more than 100,000 inhabitants ===
- Rochester (Principal city)

=== Places with 50,000 to 100,000 inhabitants ===
- Irondequoit (suburb)
- Greece (suburb)

=== Places with 25,000 to 50,000 inhabitants ===
- Brighton (suburb)
- Chili (suburb)
- Gates (suburb)
- Henrietta (suburb)
- Perinton (suburb)
- Penfield (suburb)
- Pittsford (suburb)
- Webster (suburb)

=== Places with 10,000 to 25,000 inhabitants ===
- Arcadia (town)
- Canandaigua (city)
- Canandaigua (town)
- Farmington (town)
- Geneva (city; partial)
- Geneseo (town)
- Greece (census-designated place)
- Ontario (town)
- Ogden (suburb)
- Parma (suburb)
- Sweden (suburb)
- Victor (town)

=== Places with 5,000 to 10,000 inhabitants ===
- Albion (town)
- Albion (village)
- Avon (town)
- Brockport (village)
- Clarkson (town)
- East Rochester (village and town)
- Fairport (village)
- Hamlin (town)
- Hilton (village)

- Livonia (town)
- Lyons (town)
- Macedon (town)
- Manchester (town)
- Medina (village)
- Mendon (town)
- Murray (town)
- Newark (village)
- North Dansville (town)
- Palmyra (town)

- Phelps (town)
- Ridgeway (town)
- Riga (town)
- Shelby (town)
- Sodus (town)
- Walworth (town)
- Webster (village)
- Wheatland (town)
- Williamson (town)

=== Places with fewer than 5,000 inhabitants ===
- Avon (village)
- Barre (town)
- Bloomfield (village)
- Bristol (town)
- Butler (town)
- Caledonia (town)
- Caledonia (village)
- Canadice (town)
- Carlton (town)
- Churchville (village)
- Clarendon (town)
- Clifton Springs (village)
- Clyde (village)
- Conesus (town)
- Dansville (village)
- East Bloomfield (town)
- Gaines (town)
- Galen (town)
- Geneva (town)
- Gorham (town)
- Groveland (town)
- Holley (village)
- Honeoye Falls (village)
- Hopewell (town)
- Huron (town)

- Kendall (town)
- Leicester (town)
- Leicester (village)
- Lima (town)
- Lima (village)
- Livonia (village)
- Lyndonville (village)
- Lyons (village)
- Macedon (village)
- Manchester (village)
- Marion (town)
- Mount Morris (town)
- Mount Morris (village)
- Naples (town)
- Naples (village)
- Nunda (town)
- Nunda (village)
- Ossian (town)
- Palmyra (village)
- Phelps (village)
- Pittsford (village)
- Portage (town)
- Red Creek (village)
- Richmond (town)
- Rose (town)

- Rush (town)
- Rushville (village; partial)
- Savannah (town)
- Scottsville (village)
- Seneca (town)
- Shortsville (village)
- Sodus (village)
- Sodus Point (village)
- South Bristol (town)
- Sparta (town)
- Spencerport (village)
- Springwater (town)
- Victor (village)
- West Bloomfield (town)
- West Sparta (town)
- Wolcott (town)
- Wolcott (village)
- Yates (town)
- York (town)

== Demographics ==
Historical population
| Census | Pop. | Note | %± |
|---|---|---|---|
| 1900 | 217,854 | | — |
| 1910 | 263,212 | | 20.8% |
| 1920 | 352,034 | | 33.7% |
| 1930 | 423,861 | | 20.4% |
| 1940 | 438,230 | | 3.4% |
| 1950 | 487,632 | | 11.3% |
| 1960 | 800,658 | | 64.2% |
| 1970 | 961,516 | | 20.1% |
| 1980 | 971,230 | | 1.0% |
| 1990 | 1,002,410 | | 3.2% |
| 2000 | 1,037,831 | | 3.5% |
| 2010 | 1,079,671 | | 4.0% |
| 2020 | 1,090,135 | | 1.0% |
| 2023 (est.) | 1,052,087 | | −3.5% |
Historical Population Figures

As of the census of 2000, there were 1,037,831 people, 397,303 households, and 262,131 families residing within the MSA. The racial makeup of the MSA was 83.35% White, 10.73% African American, 0.27% Native American, 1.90% Asian, 0.03% Pacific Islander, 1.99% from other races, and 1.73% from two or more races. Hispanic or Latino of any race were 4.50% of the population.

The median income for a household in the MSA was $42,733, and the median income for a family was $50,687. Males had a median income of $36,777 versus $25,999 for females. The per capita income for the MSA was $19,626.

The Rochester NY MSA is the third largest economy and the fourth wealthiest region in all of NYS after New York City, Buffalo, and Albany.

== Rochester-Batavia-Seneca Falls Combined statistical area ==
The Rochester–Batavia–Seneca Falls combined statistical area is made up of seven counties in western New York. The combined statistical area includes one metropolitan area and two micropolitan areas. As of the 2020 Census, the CSA had a population of 1,182,337.

- Metropolitan statistical area (MSA)
  - Rochester (Livingston, Monroe, Ontario, Orleans, and Wayne counties)
- Micropolitan statistical areas (μSAs)
  - Batavia (Genesee County)
  - Seneca Falls (Seneca County)

== Economy ==
Metropolitan Rochester has the third largest regional economy in all of NYS, after the NYC and Buffalo areas.

=== Top regional employers ===
As of 2016

| Employer | Number of employees |
|---|---|
| University of Rochester | 27,590 |
| Rochester Regional Health | 15,753 |
| Wegmans Food Markets Inc. | 13,606 |
| Xerox Corp. | 6,396 |
| Paychex | 4,123 |
| Rochester Institute of Technology | 3,993 |
| Lifetime Healthcare Cos (including Excellus BlueCross BlueShield) | 3,569 |
| Harris Corporation | 3,450 |
| YMCA of Greater Rochester | 2,745 |
| Tops Markets LLC | 2,588 |

=== Major shopping centers ===
- Rochester Public Market
- Village Gate Square
- The Marketplace Mall (located in the suburb of Henrietta)
- The Mall at Greece Ridge (located in the suburb of Greece)
- Eastview Mall (located in the town of Victor)
- Pittsford Plaza (located in the town of Pittsford)

==== Former shopping centers ====
- Midtown Plaza (Closed as of July 29, 2008 and demolished 2010)
- Irondequoit Mall (Located in the suburb of Irondequoit) (Closed since April 2010)

== Colleges and universities ==
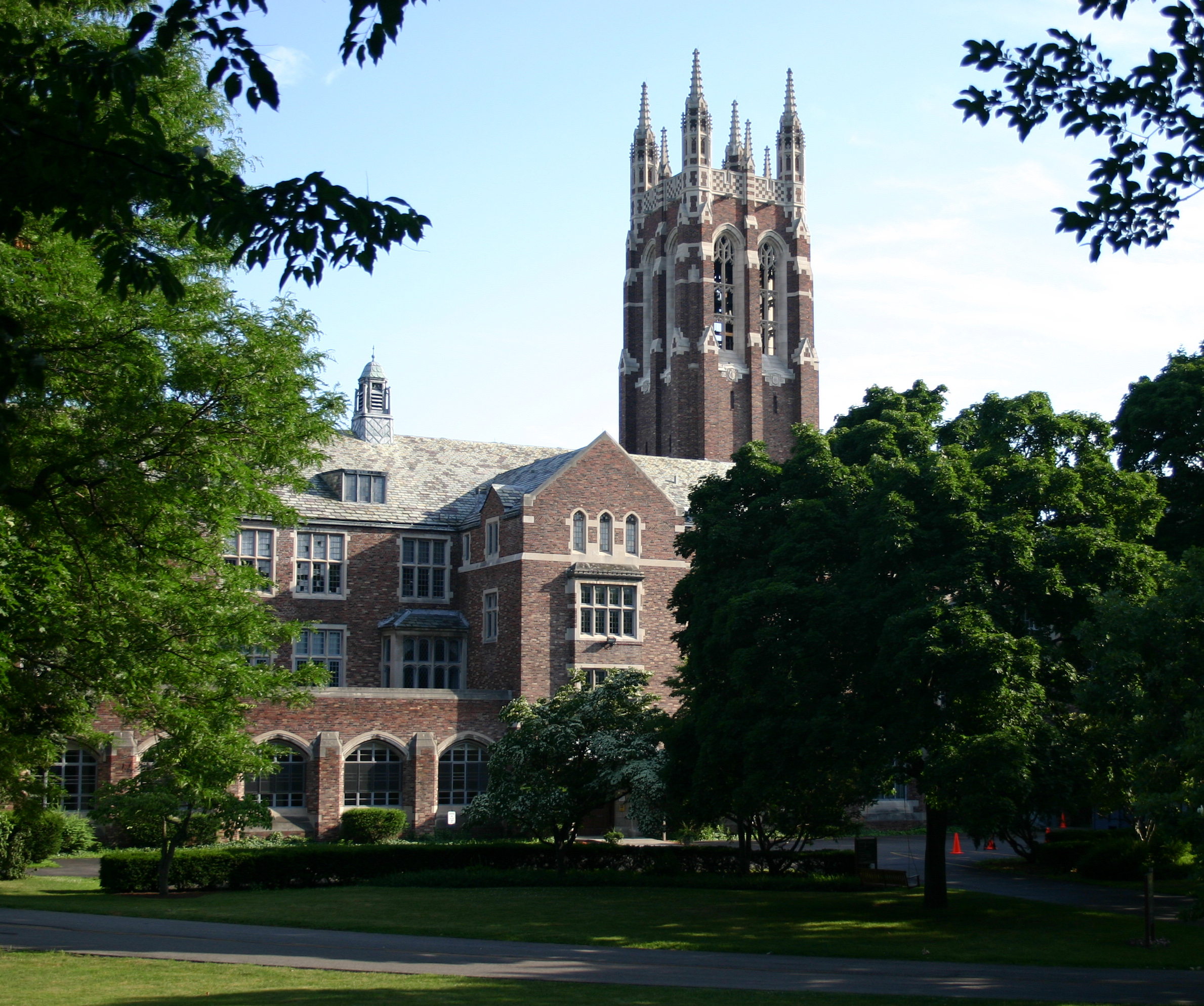
Colgate Rochester Crozer Divinity School

The Rochester area, particularly in Monroe County, has a large number of colleges and universities. In 2010, the metropolitan area was ranked the eighth-best (among "mid-sized" metros between 1 million and 2.5 million in population) in the United States by the American Institute for Economic Research. Education is one of Rochester's primary economic areas. The six-county region is home to a number of colleges and universities:

- Livingston County
  - SUNY Geneseo
- Monroe County
  - Bryant & Stratton College in Greece and Henrietta
  - Colgate Rochester Crozer Divinity School
  - Empire State College's Genesee Valley Learning Center
  - Monroe Community College
  - Nazareth University
  - Roberts Wesleyan College in Chili
  - Rochester Institute of Technology
  - St. Bernard's School of Theology and Ministry
  - St. John Fisher University
  - SUNY Brockport
  - University of Rochester
- Ontario County
  - Finger Lakes Community College
  - Hobart and William Smith Colleges

Together with Alfred State College, Alfred University, Corning Community College, Genesee Community College, Houghton College, Keuka College, and Wells College and New York Chiropractic College, all within 90 miles of Rochester, these institutions comprise the Rochester Area Colleges consortium.

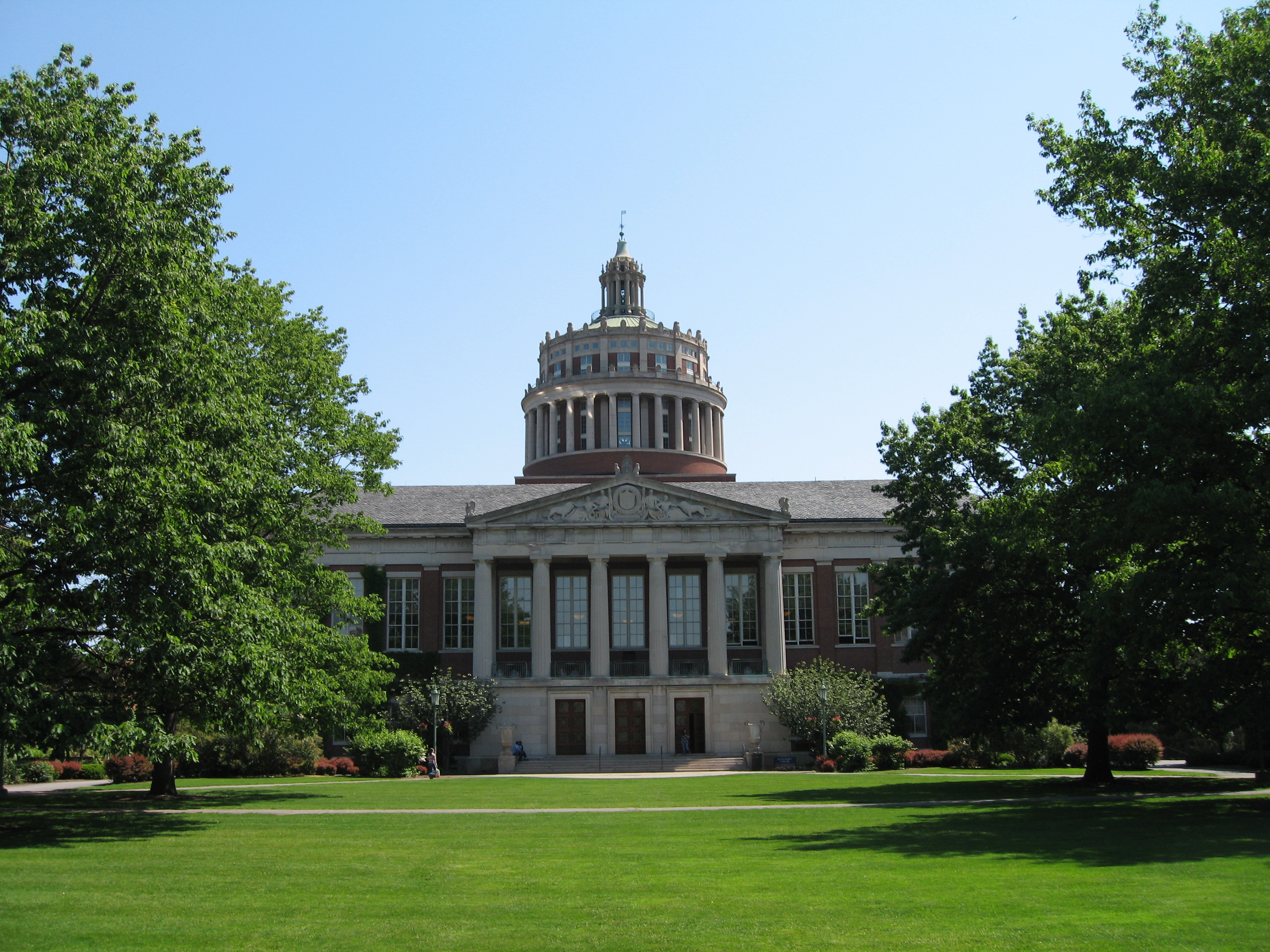
River Campus of the University of Rochester

=== University of Rochester ===
The University of Rochester (U of R), ranked as the 29th best university in the nation by U.S. News & World Report and was deemed "one of the new Ivies." The nursing school has received many awards and honors and the Simon School of Business is also ranked in the top 30 in many categories.

The University of Rochester's Laboratory for Laser Energetics (LLE) is home to the highest power laser in the world, the OMEGA EP laser.

The university is also home to the Eastman School of Music, which in 2004 was ranked the number one music school in America.

=== Rochester Institute of Technology ===
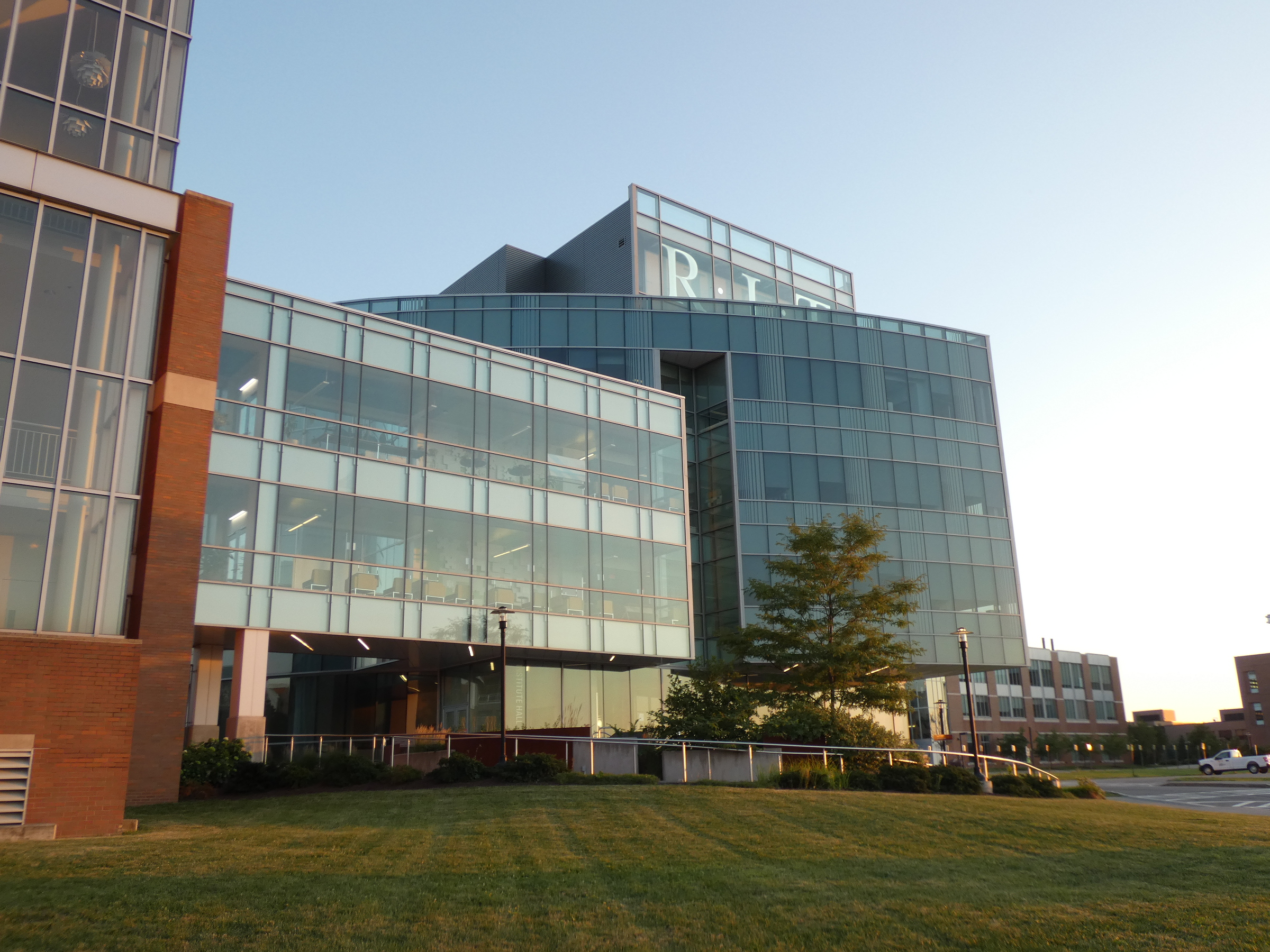
Institute Hall at RIT

The Rochester Institute of Technology (RIT) was founded in 1829 and is the tenth largest private university in the country in terms of full-time students. It is internationally known for its science, computer, engineering, and art programs, as well as for the National Technical Institute for the Deaf, a leading deaf-education institution.

RIT is among the top colleges and universities in the nation for programs in the fine arts, placing in the top 10 for many of the college's programs, including Photography (3rd), Glass art (2nd), Industrial design (8th), and others. RIT's undergraduate programs have been featured as one of nation's best in the Princeton Review, and its undergraduate engineering programs have been ranked in the top 70 in the country by the U.S. News & World Report.

=== Monroe Community College ===
Monroe Community College, the largest community college in Upstate New York, has had the top ranking community college athletic program two years in a row and was rated as the tenth best associates degree producing two year college by Community College Week. MCC has four campuses: the Downtown Campus, the main Brighton Campus which houses the Mercer Gallery, the Applied Technologies Center, and the Public Safety Training Facility.

=== Roberts Wesleyan College ===
Roberts Wesleyan was ranked the third-best value private college in the U.S. by the Princeton Review in 2007—the only school in New York State ranked in the top 10. It is also Rochester's only college affiliated with the Council for Christian Colleges and Universities.

== See also ==
- New York census statistical areas
- Sports in Rochester
