= Rochester-Genesee Regional Transportation Authority =

Public transit company in New York State

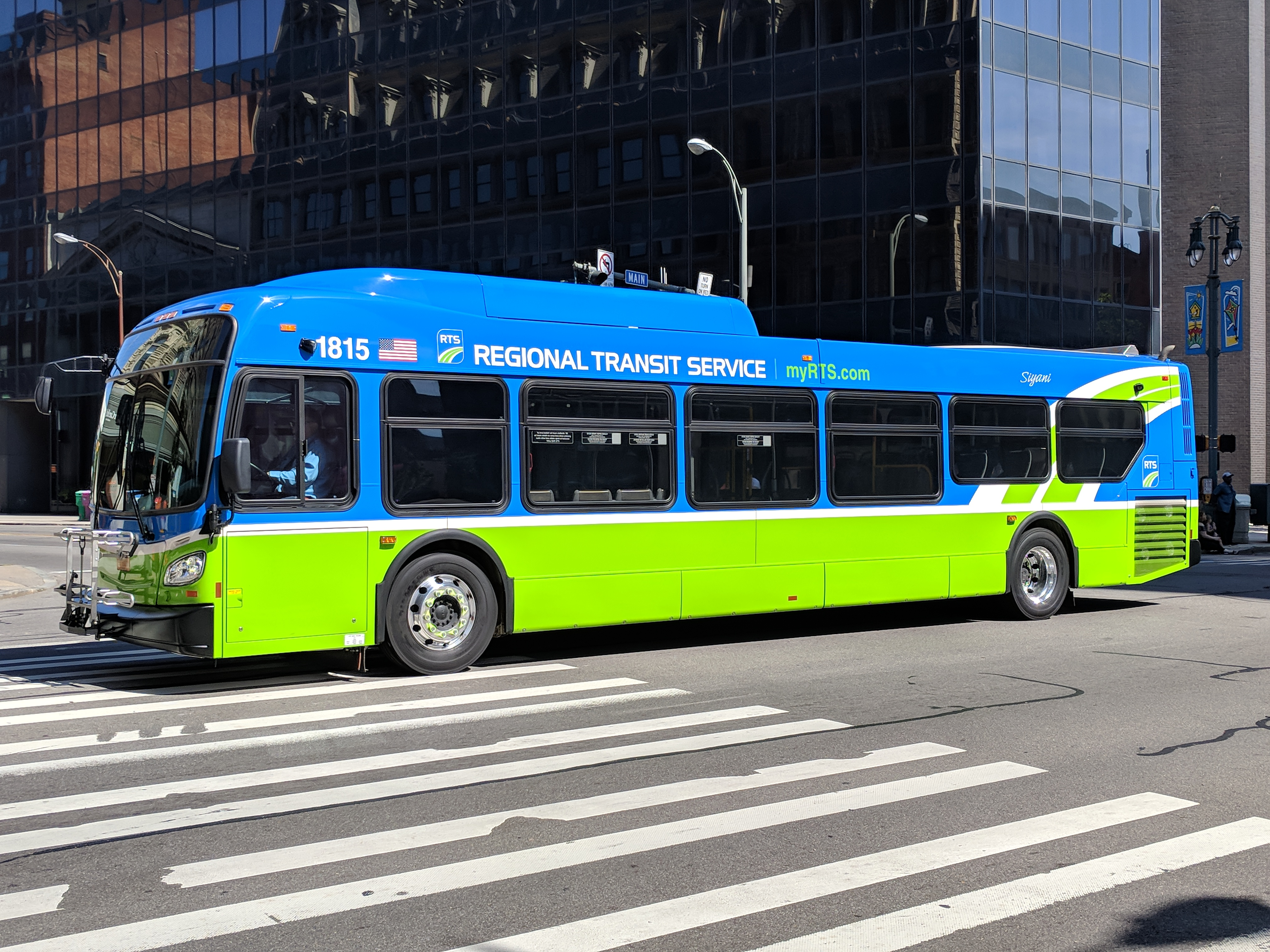
- RTS bus outside the Rochester Labor Day parade, 2018
- Founded: 1969
- Headquarters: 1372 East Main Street; Rochester, New York
- Locale: Monroe and surrounding counties
- Service area: Monroe, Genesee, Livingston, Ontario, Orleans, Seneca, Wayne, and Wyoming counties, New York
- Service type: Public transit
- Destinations: Rochester and surrounding area
- Hubs: RTS Transit Center
- Fleet: Bus, Van
- Daily ridership: 31,900 (weekdays, Q2 2026)
- Annual ridership: 11,261,300 (2025)
- Fuel type: Diesel, diesel-electric, electric
- Operator: RTS, B-Line, RTS Livingston, RTS Wayne, RTS Genesee, RTS Ontario, RTS Wyoming, RTS Orleans, RTS Seneca, RTS Access
- Chief executive: Miguel Velázquez
- Website: myrts.com

The Rochester-Genesee Regional Transportation Authority (RGRTA) is a New York State public-benefit corporation which provides transportation services in the eight-county area in and around Rochester, New York. Currently, RGRTA oversees the daily operation of eleven subsidiaries under the parent company of the RGRTA, including paratransit services. In 2025, the combined system of eleven subsidiaries had a ridership of 11,261,300, or about 31,900 per weekday as of the second quarter of 2026.

== Organization ==
The RGRTA is guided by a 16-member board of commissioners (one of which is vacant). The management team is headed by CEO Miguel Velazquez, who reports to the board. In 2017, the RGRTA had operating expenses of $116.51 million and a level of staffing of 1,045 people.

== History ==
=== Rochester Railway Company ===
Public transportation in the greater Rochester area can trace its roots back to the streetcar and interurban lines operated by the Rochester Railway Company and later New York State Railways. In 1929, New York State Railways entered receivership, and local interests formed a plan to reorganize the former Rochester Railway. After several years of negotiation, the New York State Public Service Commission approved a reorganization plan in 1937 put together by attorney Howard Woods and his committee of stockholders.

=== Rochester Transit Corporation ===
On August 2, 1938, Rochester Transit Corporation assumed operation of the bus and streetcar operations serving the city. The last streetcar line was converted to bus operation in 1941, though contract operation of the city-owned Rochester Subway continued until 1956 (RTC ended freight operations in the Subway by 1957, transferring the responsibility to the connecting railroads). The company was returned to local control in 1943 when the remaining shares owned by Associated Gas & Electric were bought out.

=== From private to public ===
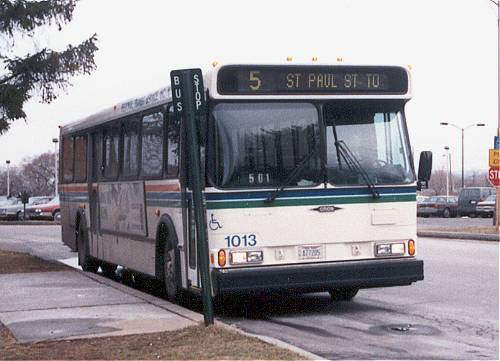
A 1990 Orion V bus

With postwar prosperity came increased use of automobiles and the spread of population out to the suburbs. Rochester Transit Corporation was plagued by labor unrest, and strikes in 1952 and 1965 ground the system to a halt. A dispute over job listings and seniority caused a brief two-day strike in May 1967. With the transit workers contract coming to an end that fall, stalled negotiations led to another strike in November 1967. The work stoppage continued through the holiday season, and with no end in sight, the City of Rochester drew up a plan to condemn and purchase the transit company operations. Over the objections of RTC, the strike came to an end on January 25, 1968, and the city contracted with National City Management Company to operate the bus lines as Rochester Transit Service.

Rochester-Genesee Regional Transportation Authority (RGRTA) was formed in 1968 by a state act of government which also formed three similar agencies in Syracuse, Buffalo, the Capital District around Albany and New York City. The RGRTA took over the former RTC bus operation from the City of Rochester and later began expanding bus service to outlying suburban and rural areas. The lines that made up the former RTC service became part of the Regional Transit Service (RTS) in Rochester and Monroe County.

== Regional Transit Service ==
The largest subsidiary of the RGRTA, Regional Transit Service (RTS) serves Monroe County (Rochester and its immediate suburbs) as well as providing service to students at Monroe Community College and Rochester Institute of Technology. Students in the Rochester City School District are also served. Suburban and park-and-ride routes serve the outlying towns in Monroe County and surrounding counties of Genesee, Livingston, Ontario, Orleans, Seneca, Wayne and Wyoming, including service into Avon, Victor, Lyons, and Le Roy. RTS also serves major shopping centers and malls in Monroe County, such as various Walmart locations, Marketplace Mall in Henrietta, Eastview Mall in Victor and The Mall at Greece Ridge in Greece.

=== Bus routes ===
Regional Transit Service operates a number of individual routes, most of which operate on a hub and spoke system from Downtown Rochester. These routes originate at the RTS Transit Center (Pictured Below) at 60 St. Paul Street along Mortimer Street.

Prior to November 28, 2014, the opening date of the transit center, routes originated from the corner of Main and Clinton or from Broad Street. The Main and Clinton stops had been in place since 1863. With the move came a change in routes, stops and times including the elimination of through-routing, in which a bus would operate between two or more different routes during scheduled runs.

On May 17, 2021, the RTS launched Reimagine RTS and the system underwent a complete renumbering and opened new Connection Hubs at highly traveled points of interest, as well as introducing 9 frequent routes running every 15 minutes from 6AM to 6PM on weekdays, although one would later become a local route later that September. These routes would form the RTS Connect network, which is the term to describe the fixed route system.

Also introduced that May 17 was RTS On-Demand, an On-Demand rideshare service that allows for a door to door service when booked within a zone. There are seven On-Demand zones in total; Brockport, Greece, Henrietta, Irondequoit, Lexington Ave, Pittsford/Eastview, and Webster. All of which have at least one connection hub to at least one RTS Connect route.

On September 13, 2021, due to the Rochester City School District experiencing a bus driver shortage, RTS reduced frequency on all but one of their frequent routes in order to assist the RCSD with transporting its students with the drivers they had. Then on January 3, 2022, after hiring and training new operators, the 8 East Main and 16 Genesee had their 15-minute frequencies restored. Two years later, on September 3, 2024, the 22 Lake also had its 15-minute frequency between Downtown and West Ridge Road restored.

As of April 6, 2026, there are 30 routes routes that run within Monroe County, designated as RTS Connect. 24 of them run to the Transit Center in Downtown Rochester. These routes consist of the Following:

Downtown Routes
Route #	Route Name	Outbound Terminus	Inbound Terminus	Additional Notes
1	St. Paul	Irondequoit Plaza Connection Hub, Irondequoit	Transit Center	
2	North Clinton	Irondequoit Plaza Connection Hub, Irondequoit	Transit Center	On weekdays (during school days), one outbound bus in morning, and one inbound bus in the afternoon head to Irondequoit and Drake Junior High Schools
3**	Joseph	Hudson Avenue Walmart	Transit Center	
4**	Hudson	Irondequoit Plaza Connection Hub, Irondequoit	Transit Center	
5**	Portland	Skyview Connection Hub, Irondequoit	Transit Center	On weekdays (during school days), one inbound bus in the afternoon deviates to the Bishop Kearney High School
6	North Goodman	Skyview Connection Hub, Irondequoit	Transit Center	On weekday school days, two outbound buses in the morning, and one inbound bus in the afternoon deviate to the Bishop Kearney High School
7	Clifford/Empire	Baytowne Plaza Connection Hub, Webster	Transit Center	
8*	East Main	Landing Heights Apartments, Brighton	Transit Center	
9	University	Blossom Loop Connection Hub	Transit Center	On weekday school days, one outbound bus in the morning, and one inbound bus in the afternoon extends further east to the Mercy High School For Young Women
10	Park	Blossom Loop Connection Hub	Transit Center	
11**	Monroe	St. John Fisher University Connection Hub, Pittsford	Transit Center	
12	South Clinton	Jewish Home, Brighton	Transit Center	
13	South Ave	Monroe Community College Brighton Campus (Rear Loop), Brighton	Transit Center	
14	Marketplace	Saginaw Drive, Henrietta	Transit Center	
15	Plymouth	UR Eastman Dental	Transit Center	
16*	Genesee	UR Eastman Dental	Transit Center	
17	Jefferson/19th Ward	Monroe Community College Brighton Campus (Main Entrance), Brighton	Transit Center	
18	Chili	Cedars of Chili, Chili Center, Chili	Transit Center	
19	Buffalo Road	Rochester Tech Park Connection Hub, Gates	Transit Center	Certain outbound and inbound buses on both weekdays and weekends throughout the week head to the Amazon Warehouse before they continue as normal.
20	Lyell	Greece-Ridge Mall Connection Hub, Greece	Transit Center	
21-(S/L)*	Dewey Short/Long Line	Eastman Ave Connection Hub (Short Line) Walmart/Northgate Plaza, Greece (Long line)	Transit Center	On weekdays from 6 AM to 6 PM, this route alternate between termini. On weekends, only the long line is active.
22-(S/L)*	Lake Short/Long Line	Eastman Ave Connection Hub (Short Line) Ontario Beach, Charlotte (Long Line)	Transit Center	On weekdays from 6 AM to 6 PM, this route alternate between termini. On weekends, only the long line is active. Two inbound 22-L buses on weekdays, and three inbound buses on weekends serve the St. Bernard's Park Apartments.
23	West Ave/Airport	Walmart/Westgate Plaza, Gates (Suspended)* Fredrick Douglass Greater Rochester International Airport Terminal (Current)	Transit Center	Service to Westgate Plaza is Suspended until further notice due to construction.
24	Bay	Waring Road Plaza	Transit Center	

Notes: Routes with one * indicate that they run every 15 minutes on weekdays from 6AM to 6PM. Routes with two ** indicate that while they normally run every 15 minutes, they are currently running at a reduced frequency due to the RCSD bus driver shortage in 2021.

Additionally, there are two routes designated as crosstown routes, one route designated as suburban, one seasonal route, and two commuter routes. All but the 91 do not serve Downtown Rochester. These are:

Other Routes
Route #	Route Name	Eastbound/Northbound Terminus	Westbound/Southbound Terminus	Additional Notes
40	Ridge Crosstown	Skyview Connection Hub, Irondequoit	Greece Ridge Mall, Greece	
41	Culver/Goodman Crosstown	Skyview Connection Hub, Irondequoit	Clay Road & Walmart, Henrietta	
50	Fairport/Penfield	Penfield Target, Fairport	Blossom Loop Connection Hub, Rochester	This route runs every 120 minutes throughout the day.
70	Seabreeze	Seabreeze Amusement Park	Skyview Connection Hub, Irondequoit	This is a seasonal route, which is active from May 1 to September 30.
91	Newark/Lyons Commuter	Lyons Central Park, Lyons	RTS Transit Center, Downtown Rochester	Only two roundtrips a day (one in the morning, and one in the evening) on weekdays.
97	Elmwood Commuter	Twelve Corners, Brighton	UR Eastman Dental	Only six roundtrips a day (three in the morning, and three in the evening) on weekdays.

Neighborhood Direct Service (These routes are designated with three digits and are only active twice per school weekday, to school in the morning, and from school in the afternoon)

- School of the Arts Prince Street
  - Route 270 Prince St/Maplewood-Charlotte
  - Route 271 Prince St/Maplewood-Dewey
  - Route 272 Prince St/Edgerton
  - Route 273 Prince St/Lyell-Otis
  - Route 274 Prince St/Dutchtown
  - Route 275 Prince St/19th Ward NW
  - Route 276 Prince St/19th Ward SE
  - Route 277 Prince St/Genesee
  - Route 278 Prince St/Mayor's Heights-Plymouth
  - Route 280 Prince St/Highland-Strong
  - Route 281 Prince St/N Winton Village
  - Route 283 Prince St/N Marketview-Northland
  - Route 284 Prince St/N Goodman-Portland
  - Route 285 Prince St/Joseph-Hudson
  - Route 287 Prince St/St. Paul-N Clinton
  - Route 289 Prince St/Park Ave
- Edison Tech/All City HS Colfax Street
  - Route 350 Colfax St/Maplewood-Charlotte
  - Route 351 Colfax St/19th Ward SE
  - Route 352 Colfax St/Maplewood-Dewey
  - Route 353 Colfax St/Edgerton
  - Route 354 Colfax St/Dutchtown
  - Route 355 Colfax St/19th Ward NW
  - Route 356 Colfax St/Beechwood
  - Route 357 Colfax St/Mayor's Heights-Plymouth
  - Route 358 Colfax St/N Marketview-Homestead
  - Route 359 Colfax St/St. Paul-N Clinton
  - Route 360 Colfax St/Genesee
  - Route 361 Colfax St/Joseph-Hudson
  - Route 362 Colfax St/N Winton Village
  - Route 363 Colfax St/Northland-Lyceum
  - Route 364 Colfax St/Portland
  - Route 367 Colfax St/N Goodman
  - Route 368 Colfax St/City SE
- Franklin Campus Norton Street
  - Route 420 Norton St/Genesee
  - Route 422 Norton St/Dutchtown
  - Route 423 Norton St/Lyell-Otis
  - Route 425 Norton St/19th Ward SE
  - Route 426 Norton St/Edgerton
  - Route 427 Norton St/Mayor's Heights-Plymouth
  - Route 428 Norton St/Northland-Lyceum
  - Route 429 Norton St/N Marketview-Beechwood
  - Route 430 Norton St/N Goodman
  - Route 431 Norton St/St Paul
  - Route 433 Norton St/19th Ward NW
  - Route 434 Norton St/N Winton Village
  - Route 436 Norton St/City SE
  - Route 437 Norton St/N Clinton
  - Route 438 Norton St/Maplewood-Charlotte
  - Route 439 Norton St/Maplewood-Dewey
- Wilson Magnet Commencement High School Genesee Street
  - Route 440 Genesee St/Maplewood-Charlotte
  - Route 441 Genesee St/Dutchtown-19th Ward NW
  - Route 442 Genesee St/St Paul-N Clinton
  - Route 443 Genesee St/Joseph-Hudson
  - Route 445 Genesee St/N Winton Village-Beechwood
  - Route 446 Genesee St/Lyell-Otis-Edgerton
  - Route 447 Genesee St/City SE
  - Route 448 Genesee St/Maplewood-Dewey
  - Route 450 Genesee St/N Goodman-Portland
  - Route 451 Genesee St/N Marketview-Northland
- Northeast Sr HS/Northwest Jr HS Fernwood Park
  - Route 630 Fernwood Pk/Edgerton
  - Route 631 Fernwood Pk/Maplewood
  - Route 632 Fernwood Pk/Genesee
  - Route 633 Fernwood Pk/Lyell-Otis-Dutchtown
  - Route 634 Fernwood Pk/19th Ward SE
  - Route 635 Fernwood Pk/Plymouth-Jefferson-19th Ward NW
  - Route 636 Fernwood Pk/N Winton Village-Beechwood
  - Route 637 Fernwood Pk/N Goodman-Portland
  - Route 638 Fernwood Pk/Hudson
  - Route 640 Fernwood Pk/St Paul-N Clinton
  - Route 641 Fernwood Pk/Joseph
  - Route 642 Fernwood Pk/City SE
- Monroe HS Alexander Street
  - Route 751 Alexander St/Maplewood-Charlotte
  - Route 752 Alexander St/Maplewood-Dewey
  - Route 753 Alexander St/19th Ward NW-Plymouth-City SE
  - Route 757 Alexander St/Dutchtown
  - Route 758 Alexander St/Genesee19th Ward SE
  - Route 759 Alexander St/Lyell-Otis-Edgerton
  - Route 760 Alexander St/N Goodman-Portland
  - Route 761 Alexander St/Hudson
  - Route 762 Alexander St/St Paul
  - Route 763 Alexander St/Northland-Lyceum
  - Route 764 Alexander St/N Clinton
  - Route 765 Alexander St/N Winton Village-Beechwood-Cobbs Hill
  - Route 768 Alexander St/Joseph
- Leadership Academy Lake Avenue
  - Route 773 Lake Ave/N Goodman-Northland-Portland
  - Route 775 Lake Ave/Joseph-Hudson
  - Route 776 Lake Ave/St Paul-N Clinton
  - Route 778 Lake Ave/Maplewood-Dewey
  - Route 779 Lake Ave/Edgerton
  - Route 780 Lake Ave/Lyell-Otis-Dutchtown
  - Route 781 Lake Ave/N Winton Village-N Marketview-Beechwood
  - Route 783 Lake Ave/Genesee-19th Ward SE
  - Route 784 Lake Ave/19th Ward NW-Plymouth
  - Route 785 Lake Ave/City SE

RTS On Demand:

- Brockport On Demand Zone
- Greece On Demand Zone
- Henrietta On Demand Zone
- Irondequoit On Demand Zone
- Lexington On Demand Zone
- Pittsford/Eastview On Demand Zone
- Webster On Demand Zone

==== Routes outside Monroe County ====
- Route 201 Albion (RTS Orleans)
- Route 202 Medina (RTS Orleans)
- Route 203 Batavia (RTS Orleans)
- Route 204 Brockport (RTS Orleans)
- Route 205 Albion/Medina (RTS Orleans)
- Route 211 City of Batavia (RTS Genesee)
- Route 214 Batavia/LeRoy (RTS Genesee)
- Route 220 Arcade Shopper Shuttle
- Route 221 Village of Warsaw (RTS Wyoming)
- Route 222 Warsaw/Batavia (RTS Wyoming)
- Route 223 Arcade Commuter (RTS Wyoming)
- Route 224 Warsaw to Arcade (RTS Wyoming)
- Route 225 Service to SASI (RTS Wyoming)
- Route 226 Silver Springs/Castile/Pike (RTS Wyoming)
- Route 227 Perry (RTS Wyoming)
- Route 228 Wyoming (RTS Wyoming)
- Route 229 Attica (RTS Wyoming)
- Routes 231 & 232 (RTS Livingston)
- Routes 242 & 243 East Livingston County via Mt. Morris (RTS Livingston)
- Route 250 Canandaigua North (RTS Ontario)
- Route 252 Canandaigua South (RTS Ontario)
- Route 253 Canandaigua – Eastview Mall (RTS Ontario)
- Route 255 Canandaigua – Geneva (Rts. 21 & 96) (RTS Ontario)
- Route 261 Geneva (RTS Ontario)
- Routes 281 & 282 Seneca Falls/Waterloo/Geneva (RTS Seneca)
- Route 290 Lyons to Canandaigua (RTS Ontario and RTS Wayne)
- Route 293 Canandaigua to Lyons (RTS Ontario and RTS Wayne)
- Route 296 Lyons to Geneva (RTS Ontario and RTS Wayne)
- Routes 302-307 Wayne County (RTS Wayne)
- Routes 307B & 308 Lyons to Webster (RTS Wayne)
- Route 331 Route 31 Shuttle (RTS Wayne)
- Pilot Routes 332 & 333 (RTS Wayne)

==== Former routes in Monroe County ====
- Route 1 Park Ave/Lake Ave (Split into Route 31 Park Ave and Route 1 Lake Ave on November 28, 2014)
- Route 2 Thurston Rd/Parsells Ave (Split into Route 2 Thurston Rd and Route 42 Parsells Ave on November 28, 2014)
- Route 2 Thurston Rd (Merged with Route 12 19th Ward/MCC on May 4, 2015, to form Route 25 Thurston/MCC)
- Route 3 Goodman/Lyell Ave (Split into Route 33 Goodman and Route 3 Lyell Ave on November 28, 2014)
- Route 4 Hudson Ave/Genesee St (Split into Route 34 Hudson Ave and Route 3 Genesee St on November 28, 2014)
- Route 5 South Ave/St. Paul Blvd (Split into Route 45 South Ave and Route 35 St. Paul Blvd on November 28, 2014)
- Route 6 Jefferson Ave/Clifford Ave (Split into Route 6 Jefferson Ave and Route 36 Clifford Ave on November 28, 2014)
- Route 7 Monroe Ave/Clinton (Split into Route 47 Monroe Ave and Route 37 Clinton on November 28, 2014)
- Route 8 Chili/Strong/East Main (Split into Route 8 Chili, Route 28 Genesee Park/Strong, and Route 38 East Main on November 28, 2014)
- Route 9 Jay/Maple/Bay/Webster (Split into Route 9 Jay/Maple and Route 39 Bay/Webster on November 28, 2014)
- Route 10 Portland/Dewey Ave (Split into Route 40 Portland and Route 10 Dewey Ave on November 28, 2014)
- Route 11 South Clinton/Goodman/Joseph Avenue (Split into Route 51 South Clinton/Goodman and Route 41 Joseph Ave on November 28, 2014)
- Route 12 19th Ward/MCC (Merged with Route 2 Thurston on May 4, 2015, to form Route 25 Thurston/MCC)
- Route 17 East Ave (renumbered Route 57 East Ave on November 28, 2014)
- Route 18 University Ave (renumbered Route 48 University Ave on November 28, 2014)
- Route 20 Brockport (renumbered Route 104 Brockport on November 28, 2014)
- Route 21 Fairport (renumbered Route 81 Fairport on November 28, 2014)
- Route 22 Penfield (renumbered Route 82 Penfield on November 28, 2014)
- Route 25 Rochester Works Shuttle (Discontinued in 2005)
- Route 26 Henrietta Loop (Discontinued in January or April 2006)
- Route 27 Unity (Discontinued in January 2010)
- Route 28 RIT Main Campus Clockwise Weekdays (Merged into Route 29 when the route was no longer a loop in summer 2004)
- Route 28 RIT Weekdays (Created in fall 2006; discontinued in January 2010)
- Route 29 RIT Main Campus Counterclockwise Weekdays (Merged with Route 28 to form Route 29 RIT Main Campus Weekdays when the route was no longer a loop in summer 2004)
- Route 29 RIT Main Campus Weekdays (Discontinued in fall 2004)
- Route 30 Webster/Xerox via Empire/Creek (Merged with Routes 40 and 45 into Route 103 Webster on November 28, 2014)
- Route 31 RIT Inn/Racquet Club (Discontinued summer 2004)
- Route 32 RIT Movie/Mall Route (Discontinued summer 2004)
- Route 33 RIT Weekends (Merged into Route 24 in fall 2004; restored in fall 2006; discontinued in January 2010)
- Route 34 RIT Holiday/Winter Break (Discontinued summer 2004; Restored for winter break 2006 season, but discontinued again early 2007)
- Route 34 RIT Summer 2008 (Only operated in summer 2008)
- Route 35 Webster/Xerox via Creek/Klem (Discontinued in 2005)
- Route 40 Webster/Xerox (Merged with Routes 30 and 45 into Route 103 Webster on November 28, 2014)
- Route 44 Greece/Ferry (Discontinued in January or April 2006)
- Route 45 Webster/Xerox via Irondequoit Mall (Merged with Routes 30 and 40 into Route 103 Webster on November 28, 2014)
- Route 50 MCC (split into Route 5 MCC Downtown Campus and Route 55 MCC Brighton Campus on September 4, 2017)
- Route 52 Park Ave to URMC (Discontinued on September 1, 2014)
- Route 68 RIT Henrietta (Discontinued on August 31, 2015)
- Route 70 University of Rochester (Discontinued fall 2007)
- Route 71 University of Rochester (Discontinued fall 2006)
- Route 72 University of Rochester (Discontinued fall 2007)
- Route 73 University of Rochester (Discontinued summer 2007)
- Route 74 University of Rochester (Discontinued summer 2007)
- Route 75 University of Rochester (Discontinued summer 2007)
- Route 76 Gates/Ogden/Chili (Discontinued January 2007)
- Route 91 Avon (renumbered Route 101 Avon on November 28, 2014
- Route 92 Perinton/Bushnell's Basin (renumbered Route 102 Perinton/Bushnell's Basin on November 28, 2014)
- Route 95 N Chili/Westside Dr/Churchville/Bergen/LeRoy (Discontinued January 2007)
- Route 96 Hilton/Hamlin/Clarkson (renumbered Route 106 Hilton/Hamlin/Clarkson on November 28, 2014)
- Route 102 Concerts by the Shore (Only operated summer 2003)
- Route 104 Wegmans Rochester LPGA (Only operated summer 2003)
- Route 105 July 4 Celebration 2003 (Only operated summer 2003)
- Route 118 Buffalo Bills Sports Shuttle (Discontinued in early 2008)
- Route 119 SU Orangemen Sports Shuttle (Discontinued in early 2005)
- Route 166 Geneseo (Discontinued in early 2008)
- Route 177 Nazareth College (Discontinued in early 2008)

==== Prior to May 17, 2021 ====
- Route 1 Lake (replaced by Route 22 Lake or RTS On Demand Greece on May 17, 2021)
- Route 3G (Park Ridge/Greece Ridge)/3W (Walmart) Lyell (replaced by Route 20 Lyell or 42 Lyell/Upper Falls Crosstown on May 17, 2021)
- Route 4 Genesee (replaced by Route 16 Genesee on May 17, 2021)
- Route 6 Jefferson (replaced by Route 17 Jefferson/19th Ward on May 17, 2021)
- Route 8 Chili (replaced by Route 18 Chili on May 17, 2021)
- Route 9J/9M Jay/Maple (replaced by Route 19 Buffalo Road or RTS On Demand Lexington on May 17, 2021)
- Route 10 Dewey (replaced by Route 21 Dewey or RTS On Demand Lexington on May 17, 2021)
- Route 13 Edison (replaced by RTS On Demand Lexington on May 17, 2021)
- Route 14 Ridge Road (replaced by Route 40 Ridge Crosstown or RTS On Demand Greece on May 17, 2021)
- Route 15 Latta (replaced by Route 21 Dewey, Route 22 Lake, or RTS On Demand Greece on May 17, 2021)
- Route 16 Crosstown (replaced by RTS On Demand Lexington on May 17, 2021)
- Route 19 S. Plymouth Ave (replaced by Route 15 Plymouth on May 17, 2021)
- Route 23 Jefferson Road (replaced by Route 14 Marketplace, Route 41 Culver/Goodman Crosstown, or RTS On Demand Henrietta on May 17, 2021)
- Route 24 Marketplace Mall/RIT (replaced by Route 14 Marketplace or RTS On Demand Henrietta on May 17, 2021)
- Route 25 Thurston (replaced by Route 17 Jefferson/19th Ward on May 17, 2021)
- Route 28 Genesee Park Blvd./Strong (replaced by Route 17 Jefferson/19th Ward or Route 18 Chili on May 17, 2021)
- Route 31 Park (replaced by Route 10 Park or RTS On Demand Pittsford/Eastview on May 17, 2021)
- Route 33 N. Goodman (replaced by Route 6 North Goodman or RTS On Demand Irondequoit on May 17, 2021)
- Route 34 Hudson (replaced by Route 4 Hudson or RTS On Demand Irondequoit on May 17, 2021)
- Route 35 St. Paul (replaced by Route 1 St. Paul or RTS On Demand Irondequoit on May 17, 2021)
- Route 36 Clifford (replaced by Route 7 Clifford/Empire or Route 41 Culver/Goodman Crosstown on May 17, 2021)
- Route 37 N. Clinton (replaced by Route 2 North Clinton on May 17, 2021)
- Route 38 East Main (replaced by Route 8 East Main on May 17, 2021)
- Route 39 Bay/Webster (replaced by Route 41 Culver/Goodman Crosstown on May 17, 2021)
- Route 40 Portland (replaced by Route 5 Portland, Route 70 Seabreeze Seasonal, or RTS On Demand Irondequoit on May 17, 2021)
- Route 41 Joseph (replaced by Route 3 Joseph on May 17, 2021)
- Route 42 Parsells (replaced by Route 41 Culver/Goodman Crosstown on May 17, 2021)
- Route 45 South (replaced by Route 13 South on May 17, 2021)
- Route 47 Monroe (replaced by Route 11 Monroe or RTS On Demand Pittsford/Eastview on May 17, 2021)
- Route 48 University (replaced by Route 9 University or Route 97 Elmwood Commuter on May 17, 2021)
- Route 51 S. Clinton (replaced by Route 12 South Clinton on May 17, 2021)
- Route 53 S. Goodman St (replaced by Route 12 South Clinton or Route 41 Culver/Goodman Crosstown on May 17, 2021)
- Route 55 MCC Brighton (replaced by Route 13 South on May 17, 2021)
- Route 57 East (replaced by Route 9 University, Route 10 Park, Route 11 Monroe or RTS On Demand Pittsford/Eastview on May 17, 2021)
- Route 81 Fairport (replaced by Route 50 Fairport/Penfield on May 17, 2021)
- Route 82 Penfield (replaced by Route 50 Fairport/Penfield on May 17, 2021)
- Route 83 Calkins Rd (replaced by RTS On Demand Henrietta on May 17, 2021)
- Route 84 Perinton/Bushnell's Basin/Eastview Mall (replaced by RTS On Demand Pittsford Eastview or Route 95 Eastview Commuter on May 17, 2021)
- Route 101 Avon/Rush Park & Ride (replaced by Route 90 Avon/Rush Commuter on May 17, 2021)
- Route 102 Newark/Lyons (replaced by Route 91 Newark/Lyons Commuter on May 17, 2021)
- Route 103 Webster (replaced by Route 7 Clifford/Empire, Route 93 Webster Commuter, or RTS On Demand Webster on May 17, 2021)
- Route 104 Brockport (replaced by Route 19 Buffalo Road, Route 94 Brockport Commuter, or RTS On Demand Brockport on May 17, 2021)
- Route 106 Hilton/Hamlin/Clarkson (replaced by Route 92 Hilton/Hamlin Commuter on May 17, 2021)
- Route 124 Marketplace Mall ROC-it (replaced by Route 14 Marketplace on May 17, 2021)
- Route 134 Hudson ROC-it (replaced by Route 4 Hudson on May 17, 2021)
- Route 145 South ROC-it (replaced by Route 13 South on May 17, 2021)
- Route 150 Dewey ROC-it (replaced by Route 21 Dewey on May 17, 2021)
- Route 163 Lyell ROC-it (replaced by Route 20 Lyell or Route 42 Lyell/Upper Falls Crosstown on May 17, 2021)
- Neighborhood Direct Service (NDS) (Vertus HS Humboldt Street)
  - Route 650 Humboldt St/Maplewood
  - Route 651 Humboldt St/Genesee-19th Ward SE
  - Route 652 Humboldt St/Lyell-Otis-Edgerton
  - Route 653 Humboldt St/PlymouthJefferson-19th Ward NW
  - Route 654 Humboldt St/Hudson-Northland-Portland
  - Route 655 Humboldt St/N Winton Village-N Marketview
  - Route 656 Humboldt St/St Paul-N Clinton-Joseph
  - Route 657 Humboldt St/City SE
- Route TE3 Tiger East End Express
- RIT Park Avenue Friday Nights

== Other subsidiaries ==
- RTS Genesee (formerly Batavia Bus Service) serves Genesee County with local bus service in the city of Batavia, commuter service to and from Le Roy, and once-weekly dial-a-ride service to many of the smaller outlying communities of Wyoming County. Also of note, the RTS Genesee is the oldest of the smaller subsidiaries of the RGRTA network.
- RTS Livingston (formerly Livingston Area Transit Service) serves Livingston County with several routes connecting with the county seat of Geneseo and to sites in/near Rochester. It also operates a local bus service in Geneseo and special service for students at SUNY Geneseo. One line connects to RTS Wayne buses in Perry.
- RTS Wayne (formerly Wayne Area Transit Service) serves Wayne County with several loop routes based around the county seat of Lyons and the town of Sodus. Then WATS joined the RGRTA as a subsidiary in 1980. A shuttle service also connects with Regional Transit Service (RTS) buses during commuting hours in Lyons.
- RTS Wyoming (formerly Wyoming Transit Service) serves Wyoming County, running three loops connecting towns in the community to the county seat of Warsaw. A local loop bus service is also offered to passengers weekdays in the Village of Warsaw.
- RTS Ontario (formerly County Area Transit Service) serves Ontario County with a focus on Canandaigua and Geneva.
- RTS Orleans (formerly Orleans Transit Service) serves Orleans County with a focus on the larger villages of Albion and Medina with one line connecting to the RTS Genesee subsidiary in Batavia, and special service for students at SUNY Brockport.
- RTS Seneca (formerly Seneca Transit Service) serves Seneca County with a focus on Geneva, Seneca Falls, and Waterloo. Additional service also operates on a less frequent schedule as far south as Interlaken and Lodi.
- RTS Access (formerly Lift Line) (provider of paratransit services to the area served within 3/4 mile of any fixed RTS route)
- RGRTA Maritime Development Corporation
- Genesee Transportation Service Council Staff, Inc.

On August 19, 2014, RGRTA announced a rebranding of all their bus lines in the surrounding counties under their control to be named RTS, with the county name following, as shown above, rather than independent names. The changes were officially implemented immediately with equipment and uniforms changing as they are phased in.

== Fares ==
Below is the fare chart for riding RTS Services:

Fare Chart/Pass Price (can be paid with cash (exact change preferred), RTS Go card or mobile, Apple Pay and/or Google Wallet via a smart device, or chip-enabled bank cards)
Fare Type	Single/Base (RTS Connect)	All-Day (RTS Connect)	Monthly (RTS Connect)	RTS On Demand	Notes
Regular	$1	$3	$56	$3	
Reduced Fare*	$0.50	$1.50	$28	$1.50	In order to be eligible for the reduced fare, passengers must either be: A child between the ages of 6 and 11.; Senior citizens aged 65 and above.; Any person with disabilities.; Those qualified must prepare a Government-Issued ID or Medicare card upon boarding.

Passengers are also able to ride for free if they are:

- A Child below 5 accompanied by a fare paying adult (limited to three per adult).
- RTS Access Customers with an RTS Access ID, as well as a PCA traveling with an RTS Access Customer.
- Veterans who have a bus passed issued by the Veterans Outreach Center.
- EBT card holders (Managed by the Monroe County Department of Health Services)
- RCSD Students whom attend either East High School, Edison Tech, Padilla High School, Monroe High School, School of the Arts, or Wilson Magnet.
- Monroe Community College students with their U-Pass.

=== RTS Go ===
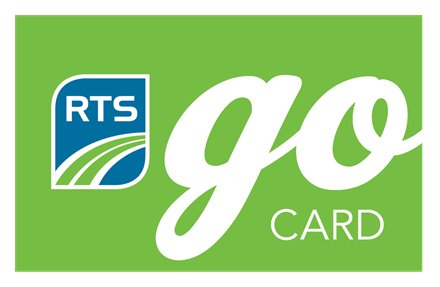
Front of an RTS Go Card

Introduced on July 15, 2020, RTS Go is a contactless fare system that is used in Monroe County for fare payment on board RTS Services. It has two forms: A physical stored-value smart card that can be reloaded at either the ticket vending machines inside the Transit Center or at a specified retail location, and a mobile account integrated into the bus and train tracker; Transit. Both forms can be connected to each other. The main feature of this system is fare capping, where passengers can tap in for up to three rides in a single day to earn unlimited rides for the rest of the day, or up to 56 times in one month for unlimited rides for the remainder of said month (both caps match up with the prices of the corresponding pass type shown above).

An update to physical RTS Go Cards was introduced in Mid-August, 2022, where RTS partnered with a retail network service called VanillaDirect, allowing for newer cards produced from Mid-August onwards to also be reloaded at specified retail locations throughout the county.

The next update for the system took place on January 16, 2024, where after an update to the Transit app, passengers with an RTS Go mobile account can refill their value with Apple Pay and Google Wallet, although direct fare payment using these services via a smart device (e.g. Smartwatches and smartphones with NFC capabilities) would not be introduced until September 1, 2025, where chip-enabled credit/debit cards, along with smart devices with Apple Pay and Google Wallet enabled are able to tap on RTS Go validators to pay the fare. The fare capping capabilities apply for these methods so long as the choice of payment is specified on their accounts.

== Facilities ==
In 2014, the authority opened a $50 million 87,000 square feet (8,082.56 m^{2}) RTS transit center in downtown Rochester, replacing the former bus station that was part of Midtown Plaza. The center has 30 bays capable of handling up to 100 buses per hour.

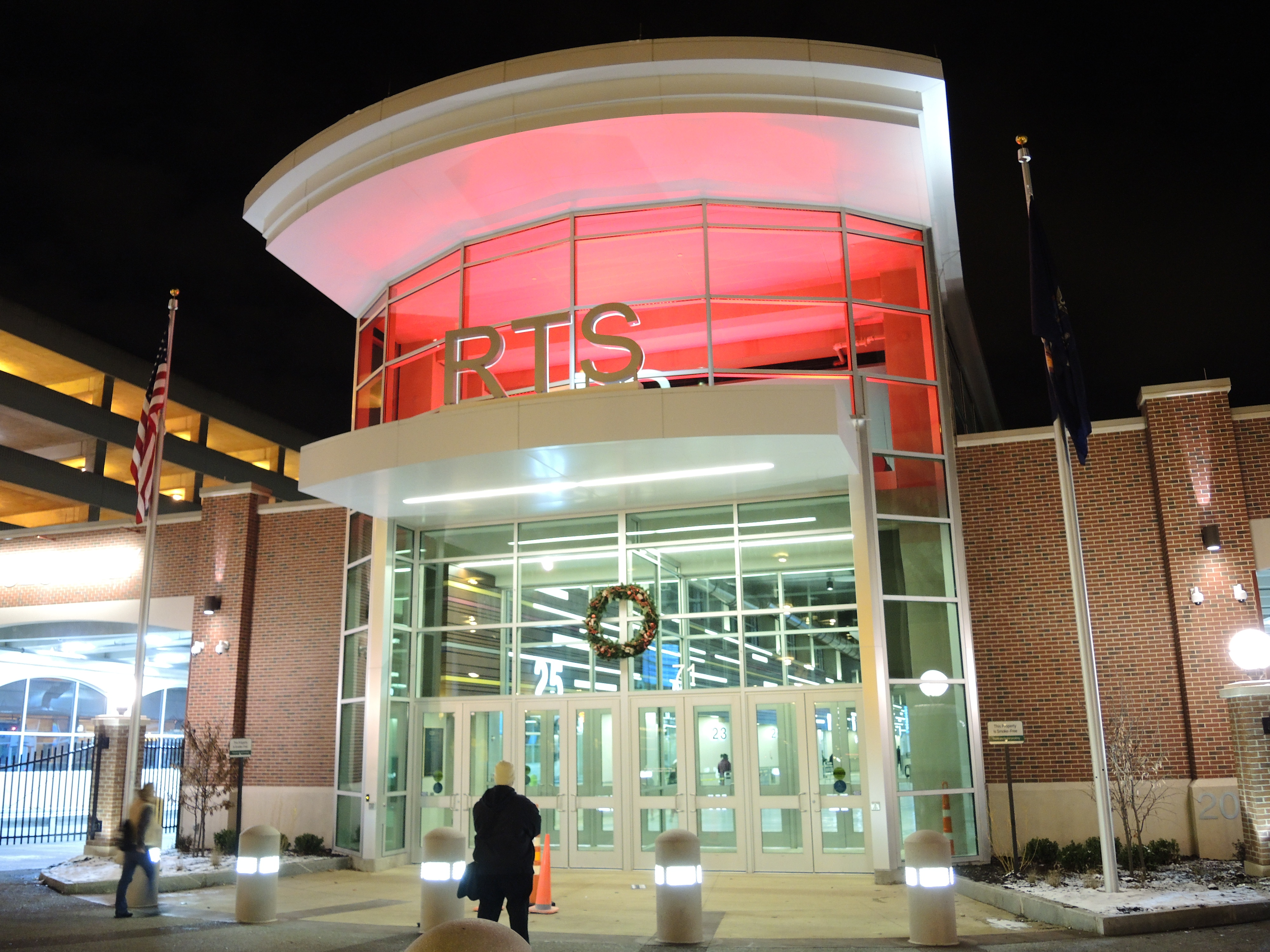
Clinton Avenue entrance

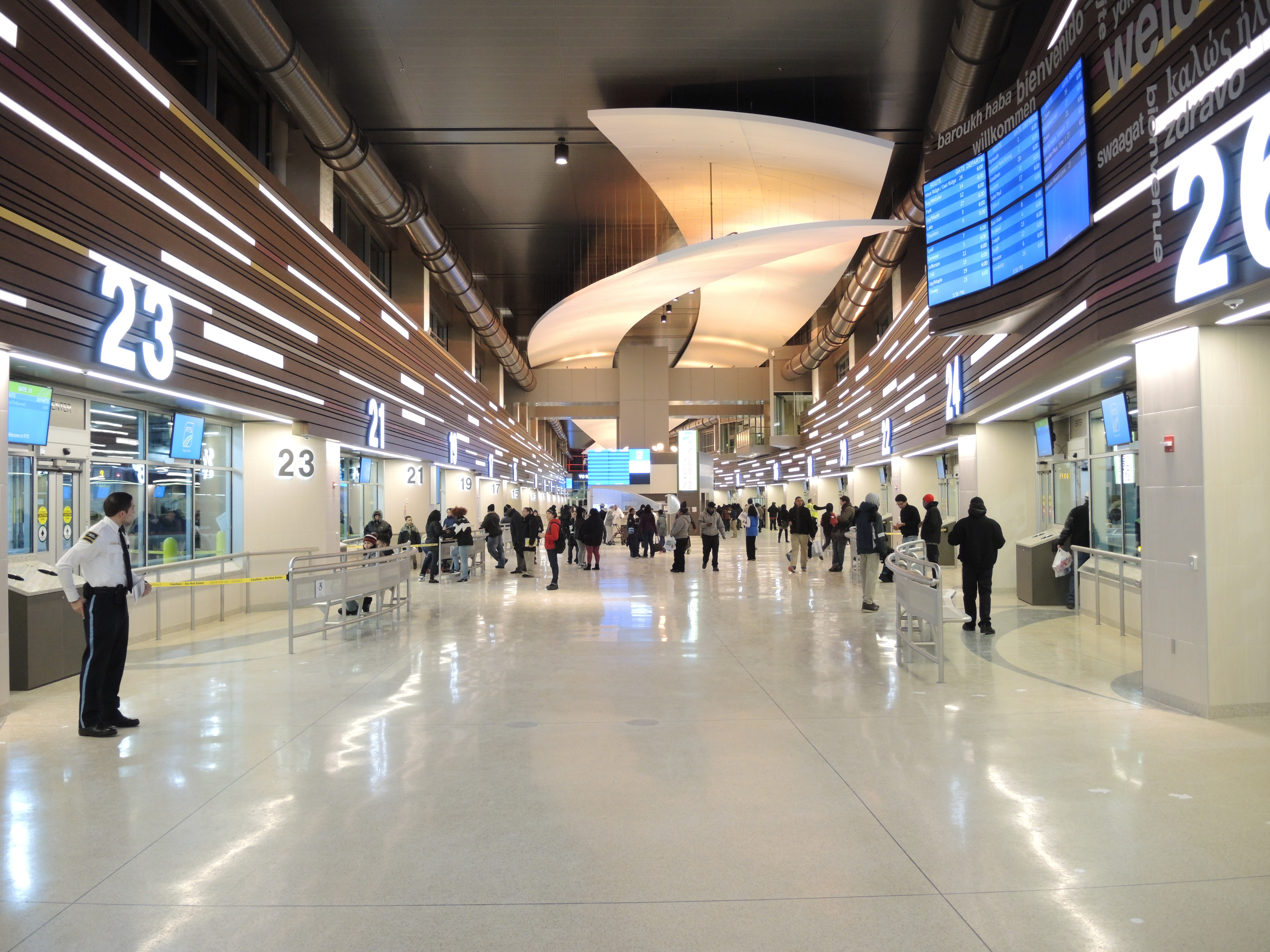
Interior viewed from the Clinton Avenue entrance

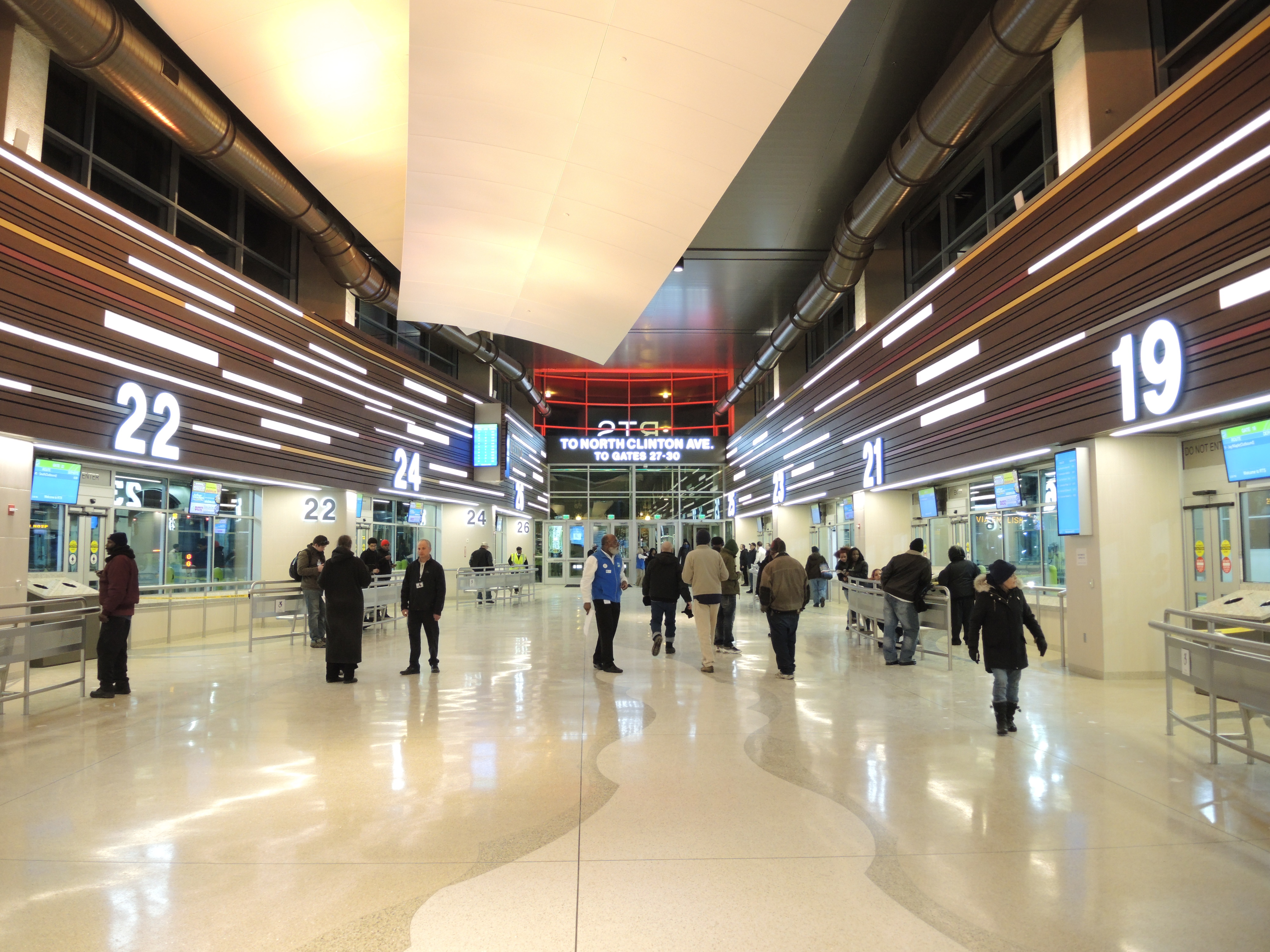
Interior looking toward the Clinton Avenue entrance

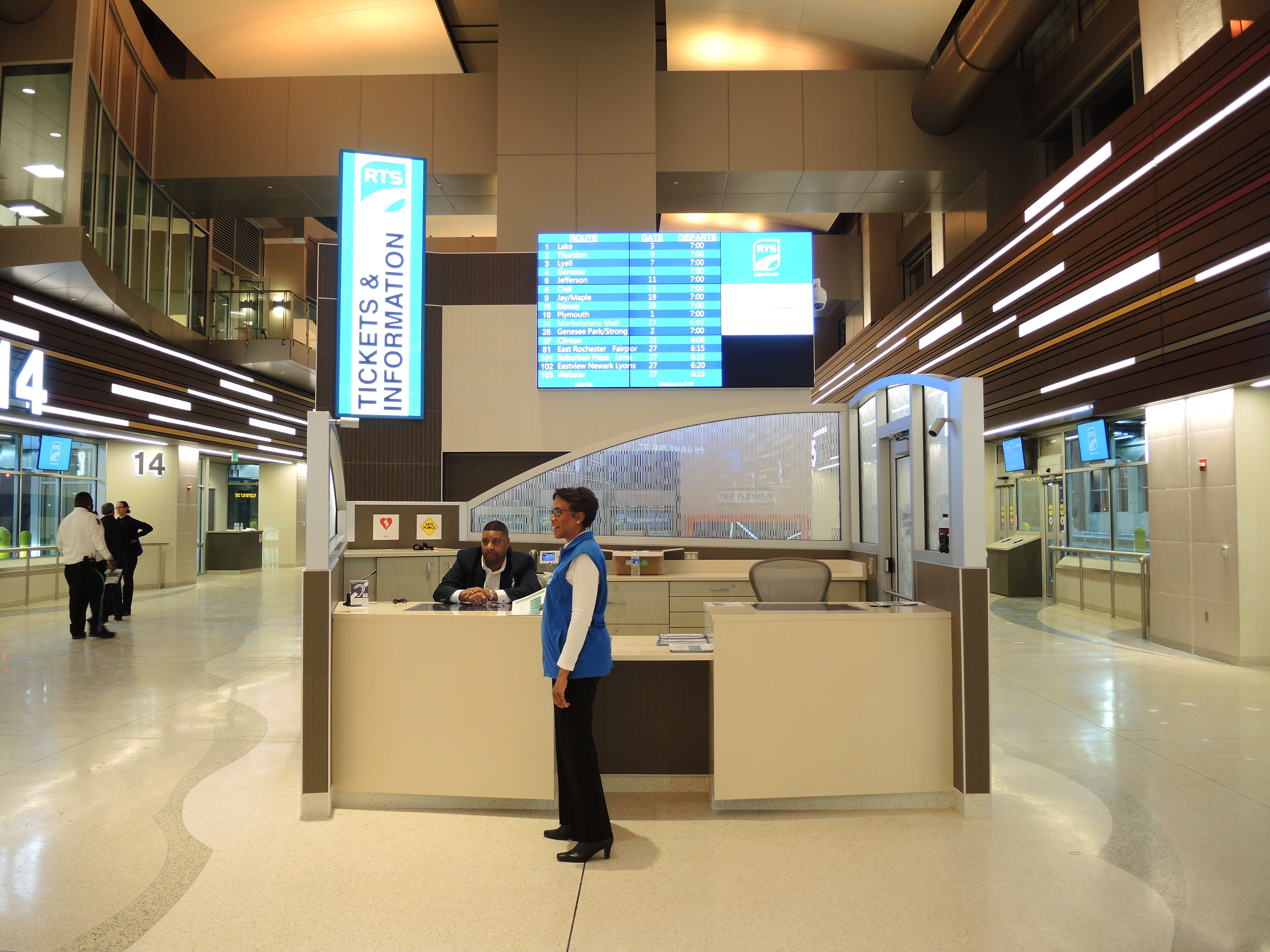
Ticket and information counter

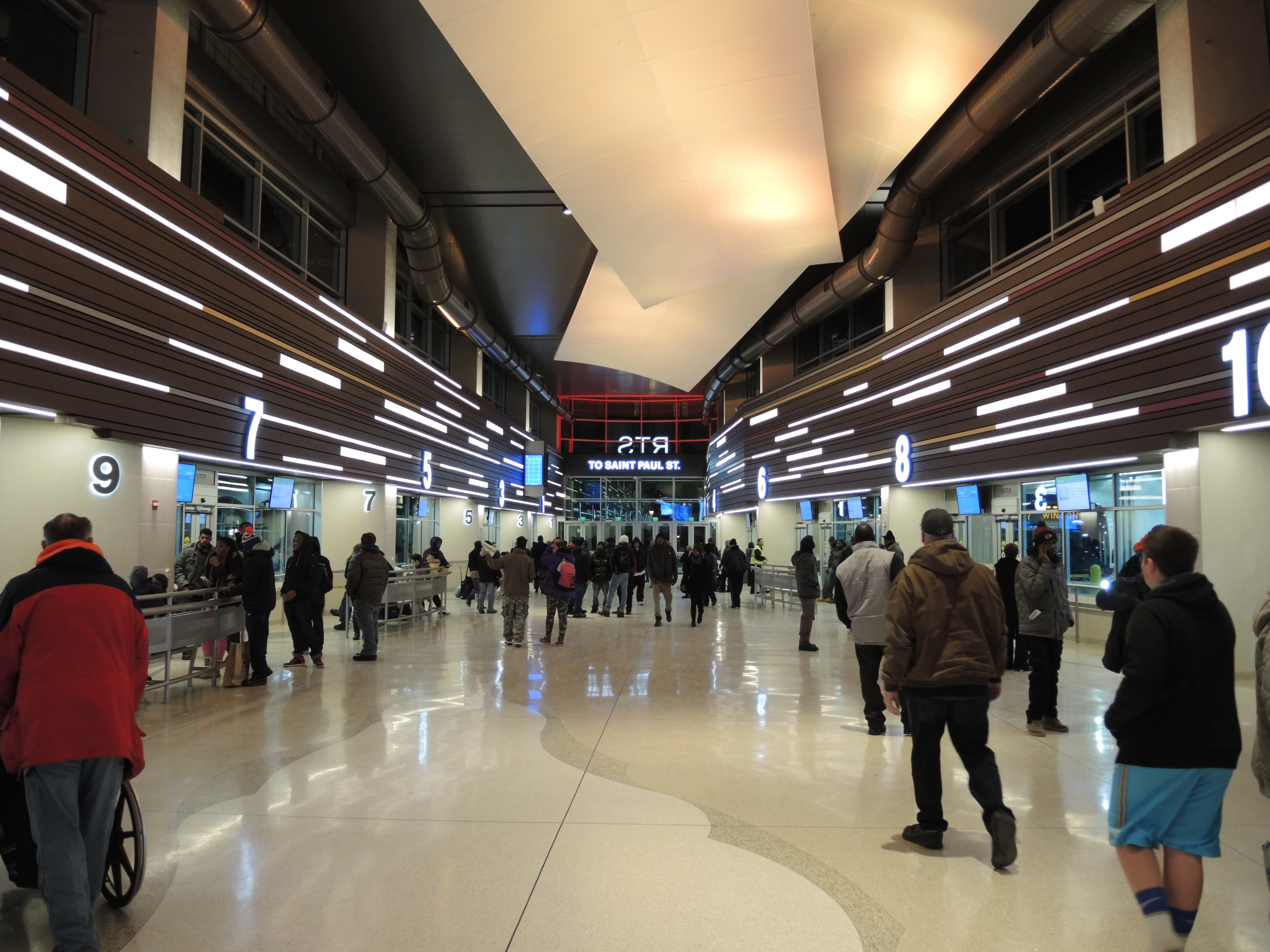
Interior looking toward the St. Paul Street entrance

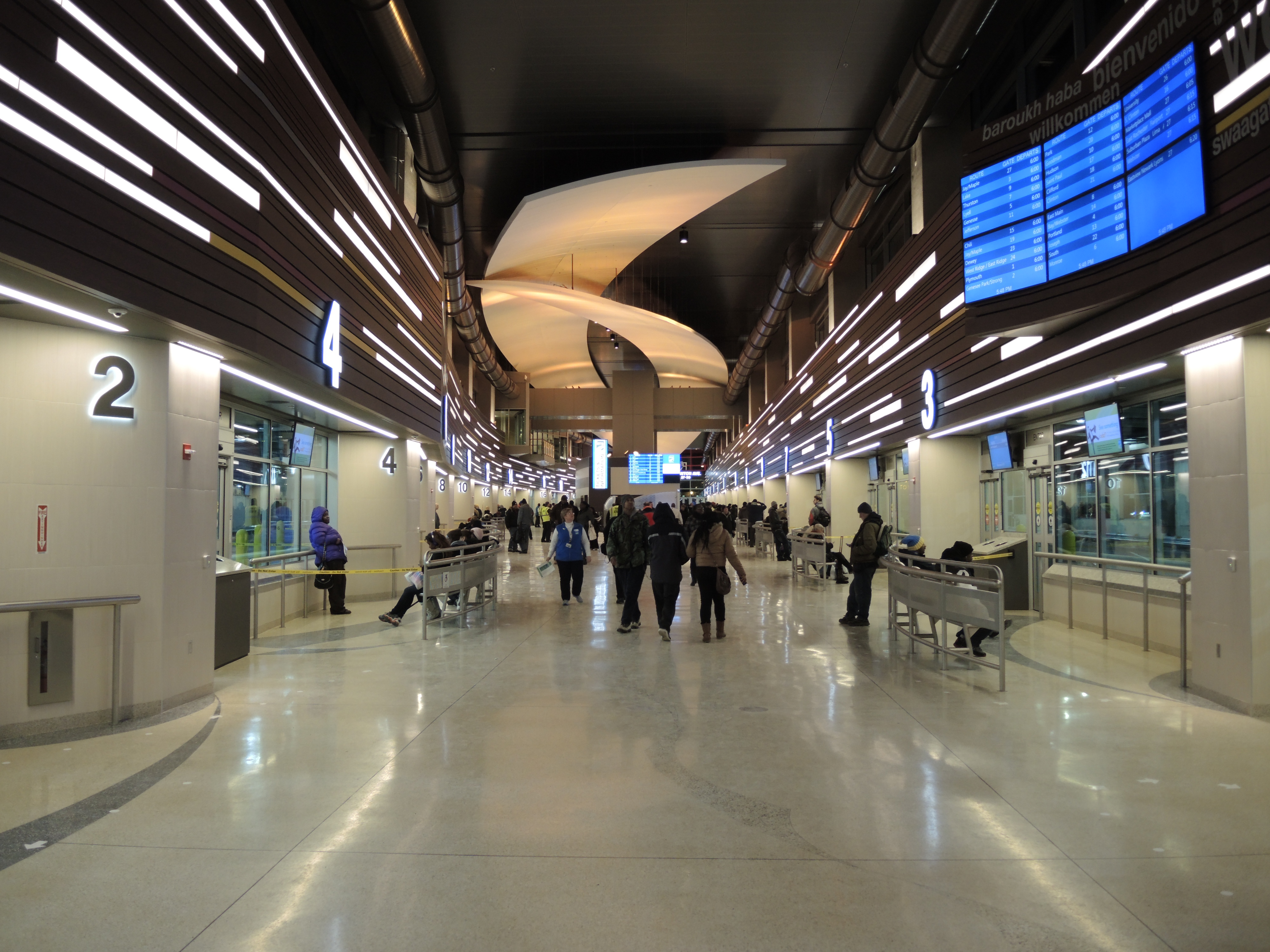
Interior viewed from the St. Paul Street entrance

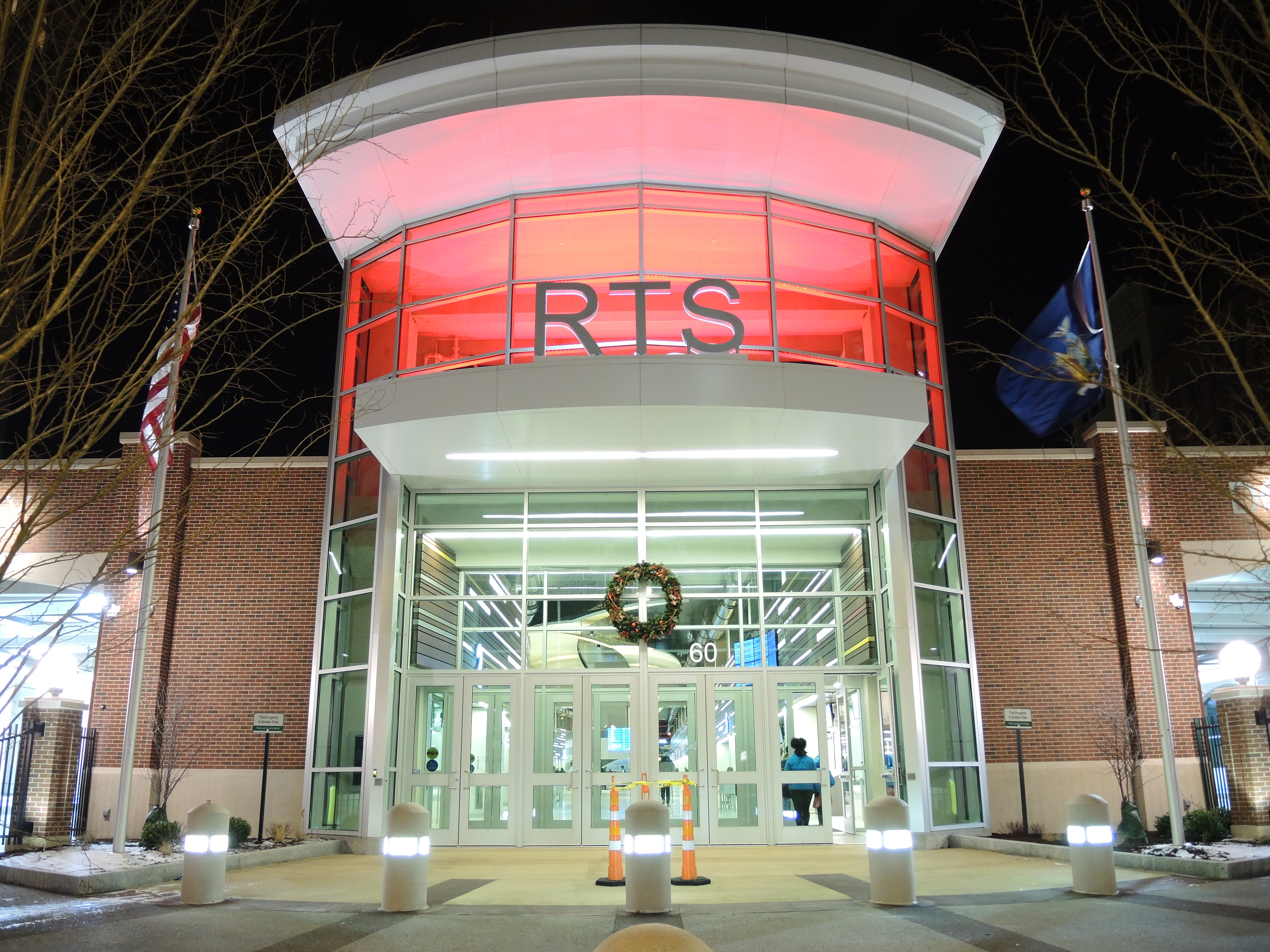
St. Paul Street entrance

== See also ==
- Capital District Transportation Authority – Albany, New York
- Central New York Regional Transportation Authority – Syracuse, New York
- Metropolitan Transportation Authority – New York Metropolitan Area
- New York State Thruway Authority
- Niagara Frontier Transportation Authority – Buffalo, New York, and Niagara Falls, New York

== References and Notes ==
AThis ridership number only accounts for RTS Monroe County. It does not include other subsidies, including RTS Access.
