= Skyview on the Ridge =

Defunct shopping mall in Irondequoit, New York

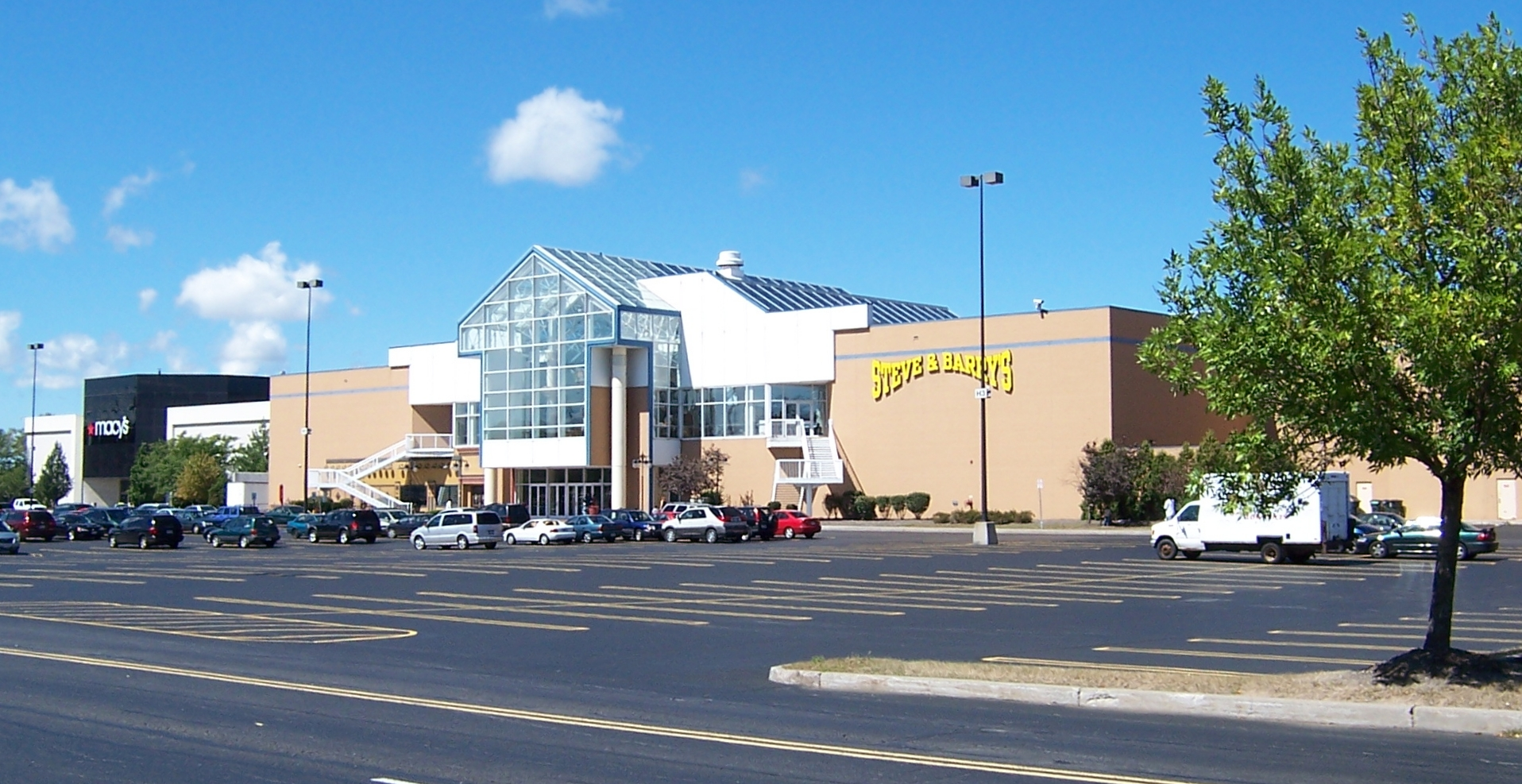
- Main entrance as it appeared in September 2007
- Location: Irondequoit, New York, United States
- Coordinates: 43.1985°N 77.5700°W
- Opened: March 1, 1990; 36 years ago
- Closed: February 2, 2009; 17 years ago
- Developer: Wilmorite Properties
- Manager: Angelo Ingrassia
- Owner: Angelo Ingrassia
- Num. of stores: 110 (at peak)
- Num. of anchor tenants: 4 (at peak)
- Floor area: 1,000,000 square feet (93,000 m^{2})
- Floors: 2

Skyview on the Ridge is a community center and former shopping mall in Irondequoit, New York, a suburb of Rochester. It opened in 1990 as Irondequoit Mall, featuring anchor stores Sibley's, J. C. Penney, and Sears, with McCurdy's added later.

== History ==
Wilmorite Properties announced plans for Irondequoit Mall in June 1985. By May 1988, the first three anchor stores were confirmed: Sears, J. C. Penney, and Sibley's. Sibley's was renamed Kaufmann's before the mall opened in March 1990, with approximately 110 stores, and an estimated 80,000 customers in its first weekend of business. McCurdy's opened as a fourth anchor store in 1992. It became The Bon-Ton in 1995. The mall was an early success, but was a quarter empty by 2001. In February 2002, Wilmorite sold the mall to an investor group led by Equitable Life Assurance Society of the United States.

JC Penney closed in January 2003. The struggling mall was sold by Equitable in May 2005 to Bersin Properties, headed up by former Pyramid Companies executive Adam Bersin, and renamed Medley Centre. Bersin had limited success trying to turn the mall around, selling an outparcel to Target and bringing in Steve & Barry's as a tenant to fill the space vacated by JCPenney.

Target opened in 2007. That same year, The Bon-Ton closed and Scott Bersin's interest in Bersin Properties was purchased by Scott R. Congel, a former principal with The Pyramid Companies of Syracuse. Congel announced plans to add a 421-room hotel, 330 condominium units and a 16-screen movie theater, along with retail, restaurant and office space and an underground parking garage. The Great Recession hit before any work began.

The mall interior closed in February 2009. Macy's closed in April 2014. Sears, the final store at the mall, closed in April 2016.

On January 21, 2016, local real estate developer Angelo Ingrassia purchased the center at auction for $100,000. On August 29, 2017, Ingrassia announced plans to redevelop the site as Skyview on the Ridge, a mixed-use development with an office park, retail, a community center, and a large residential component.

On July 30, 2019, the Town of Irondequoit approved a referendum allowing the town to borrow $7.25 million to build a community center.

In 2021, the mall's double decker carousel was dismantled and sold.

The former Sears anchor was redeveloped as Skyview Park Apartments, affordable senior housing, in 2022.

== See also ==
- Eastview Mall
- The Mall at Greece Ridge
- The Marketplace Mall
- Midtown Plaza
