= McCurdy's =

Rochester, New York-based department store

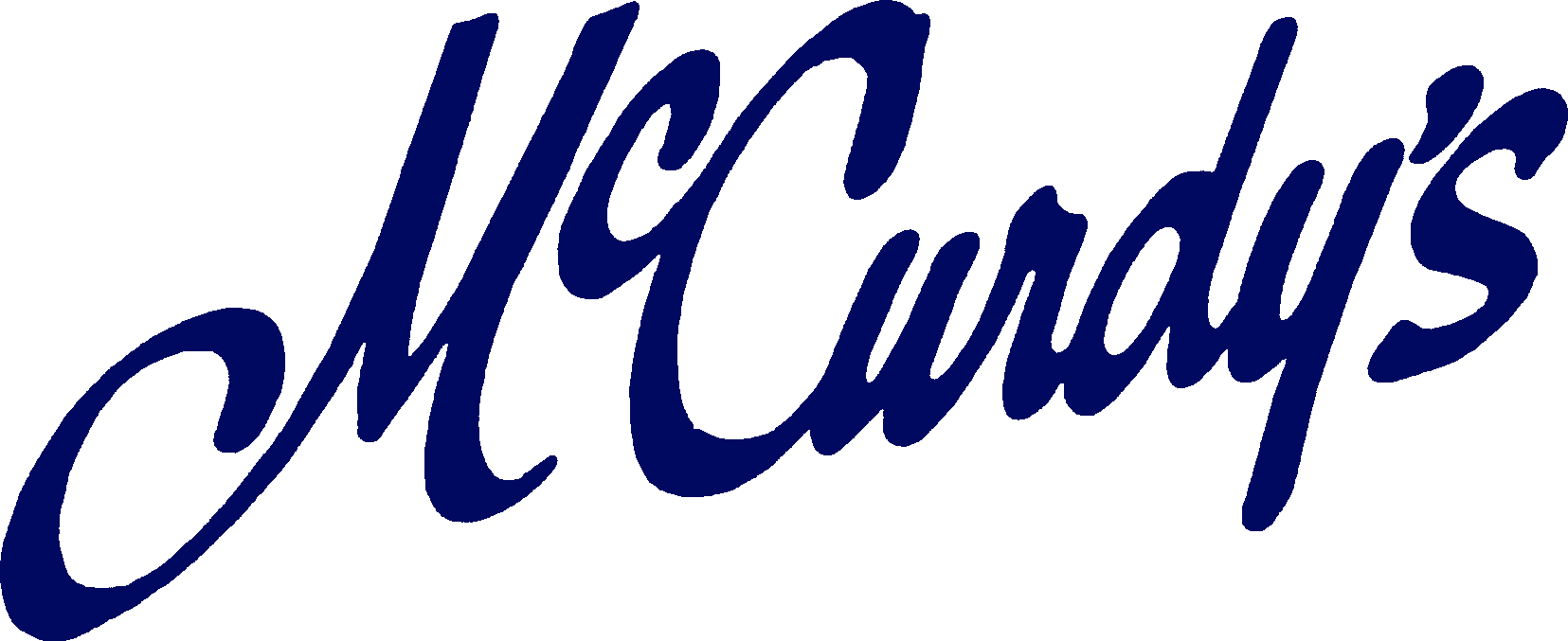
- Type: Department Store
- Industry: retailing
- Predecessor: McCurdy and Norwell Co.
- Founded: Rochester, New York, United States (1901)
- Founder: John Cooke McCurdy
- Defunct: 1994
- Fate: merged into The Bon-Ton
- Successor: The Bon-Ton
- Key people: Gilbert McCurdy
- Products: clothing, merchandise, baked goods,
- Subsidiaries: B. Forman Co. (1968-1994)

McCurdy's (formally McCurdy and Company) was a Rochester, New York–based department store. Founded in 1901, the company was acquired by May Department Stores in 1994, but as a result of an antitrust settlement due to both McCurdy's and May's Kaufmann's stores being the predominant anchors in the area shopping malls, its stores were divested to The Bon-Ton Department store chain.

== History ==
McCurdy's was started as McCurdy and Norwell Co. in 1901 by John Cooke McCurdy, who came to Rochester by way of Philadelphia and Ireland. The store was located at the corner of Main and Elm streets. This location would later form the basis of a mall at the location when Gilbert McCurdy, along with fellow department store owner Maurice Forman of B. Forman Co., helped found Rochester's Midtown Plaza, where its flagship store would be incorporated in and become the main anchor of the mall.

Other locations would later be in Pittsford, New York, Greece, New York in Long Ridge Mall and Northgate Plaza, Irondequoit, New York in Irondequoit Mall, Henrietta, New York in The Marketplace Mall, Geneva, New York in Town and Country Plaza, and Victor, New York in Eastview Mall. The Northgate store made McCurdy's the first Rochester department store to open in the suburbs when it opened in 1953.

McCurdy's was a medium to high priced establishment, in direct competition with Sibley, Lindsay and Curr (later just Sibley's). To make themselves accessible to all, the Midtown, Long Ridge (now Greece Ridge), and Eastview Malls had "budget stores" which ran seconds, closeouts, and special merchandise at prices just above the discount houses, but with McCurdy's service and cachet. The midtown location also contained a bakery and restaurant.

McCurdy’s bought fellow Rochester-based department store B. Forman’s in 1968. The purchase gave McCurdy’s sole control of Midtown; previously control of the mall had been divided between the two. McCurdy's continued to operate both stores until 1994. The 1989 Acquisition of Elmira, NY based Iszard's would later offer expansion into Elmira and Ithaca areas.

McCurdy & Co. borrowed $4.5 million in January 1994 from the City of Rochester, citing a need for working capital, and giving a mortgage on the McCurdy Midtown building as security. In July 1994, McCurdy's and B. Forman Co. closed. It was announced that four McCurdy locations would be sold to the May Company, and all B. Forman Co. stores would be closed. The going-out-of-business sale at McCurdy's and B. Forman started a few days later.

The Midtown Plaza location (McCurdy's main store) and Sibley's main store were directly across the street from each other on East Main Street in downtown Rochester, although McCurdy's was a bit more conservative in merchandising.

Midtown's most striking feature was the mechanical "Clock of Nations" in the main floor atrium. Rising two stories, the clock featured mechanical dolls that would circle the main clock on the hour with a country highlighted each hour. The dolls were housed in capsules featuring a door that would open and close to reveal the dolls. The highlighted country's capsule would be illuminated, and a melody appropriate to the country would play. Generations of children (and adults) sat in the atrium in eager anticipation each hour. When Midtown's patronage dwindled, stores were closing, and the future was obvious, the clock became a cause célèbre all across the region. The clock was moved to the Greater Rochester International Airport terminal in 2008.
