= The Marketplace Mall =

Defunct mall in Henrietta, New York

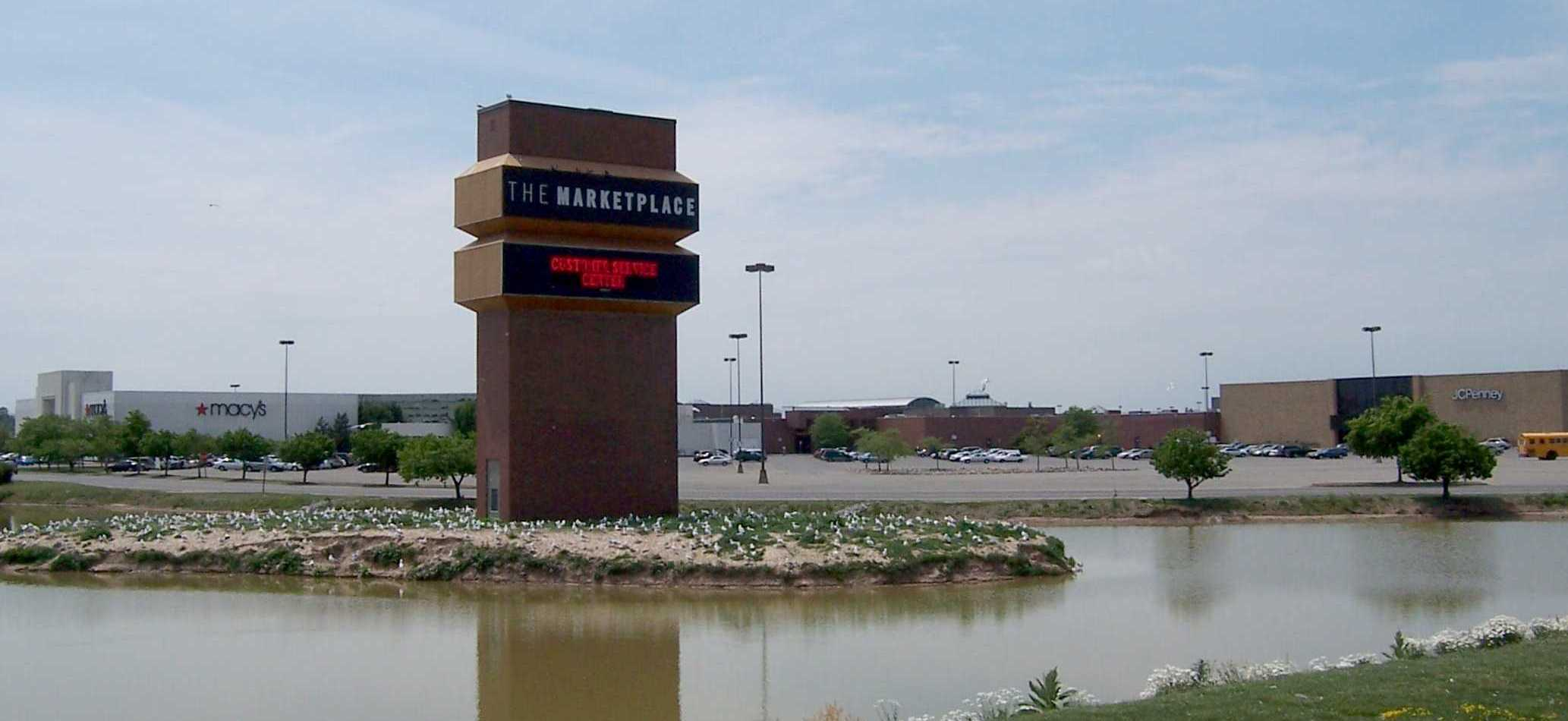
- "The Place to Be" - Outdoor view
- Location: Henrietta, New York, United States
- Coordinates: 43.08377°N 77.632978°W
- Opened: October 7, 1982; 44 years ago
- Closed: December 31, 2025; 10 months ago
- Developer: Wilmorite Properties
- Manager: Wilmorite Properties
- Owner: Wilmorite Properties
- Num. of stores: 140 (at peak)
- Num. of anchor tenants: 5 (at peak)
- Floor area: 804,806 sq ft (74,769 m^{2})
- Floors: 1 (2 in former Dick's Sporting Goods, JCPenney)
- Website: themarketplacemall.com

The Marketplace Mall was a shopping center managed by Wilmorite and located on Hylan Drive in Henrietta, New York, a suburb of Rochester.

== History ==
The space at the southeast corner of West Henrietta Road (NY 15) and Jefferson Road (NY 252) was previously Hylan Airport, a general aviation facility home to Ray Hylan's school of aviation. In the 1970s, Hylan moved his school to the Rochester – Monroe County Airport and worked with the Wilmot family to develop the former airfield into commercial space.

The Marketplace Mall opened on October 7, 1982, and was touted as the largest mall located between New York City and Cleveland. On opening day, The Marketplace was anchored by Sibley's, McCurdy's, B. Forman Co. and Sears. It was home to 140 specialty retailers. In February 1983, JCPenney added on as the fifth department store. Since 1982 four outparcels have been added to the property. The food court was added in 1987. In 1990, Sibley's became Kaufmann's. In 1994, McCurdy's became The Bon-Ton. In 2001, an 84,000 sq ft (7,800 m^{2}) Galyan's was added on to the south side of the mall, which was converted to a Dick's Sporting Goods in 2004. In September 2006, Kaufmann's became Macy's.

In 1982, The Marketplace was the fifth shopping center to open in the Rochester, NY Market behind Midtown Plaza in 1962, Greece Towne Mall in 1967, Long Ridge Mall in 1971, and Eastview Mall in 1971. It was the second major retail shopping center to open in Henrietta following Southtown Plaza. The area surrounding the mall, which was previously vacant farmland, has been developed both commercially and residentially over the past twenty years. There are five parcels totaling 80 acres (320,000 m^{2}) available for future development located adjacent to the Marketplace Commons. Marketplace Commons was developed by Wilmorite and is located next to the Marketplace Mall.

=== 2017–2025: Decline ===
Macy's closed in 2017. Floor & Decor opened in the space in August 2023.

Sears closed in 2019 and was replaced by a $240 million development for UR Medicine, completed in 2023.

In 2024, Dick's Sporting Goods moved to the former Christmas Tree Shops in the Market Square plaza. This left JCPenney as the only remaining anchor store.

On November 11, 2025, Wilmorite announced that it would close the interior portion of the mall, and relocate the remaining tenants with interior only entrances to other Wilmorite properties.

The Marketplace Mall officially closed on December 31, 2025. According to a recent news article, the inside stores of the mall will be gutted out and repurposed.

=== Redevelopment ===
The Marketplace Mall is planned for demolition in 2026. It will be replaced with a mixed-use development, including four story apartment buildings with 150+ units.
