= B. Forman Co. =

American retail store

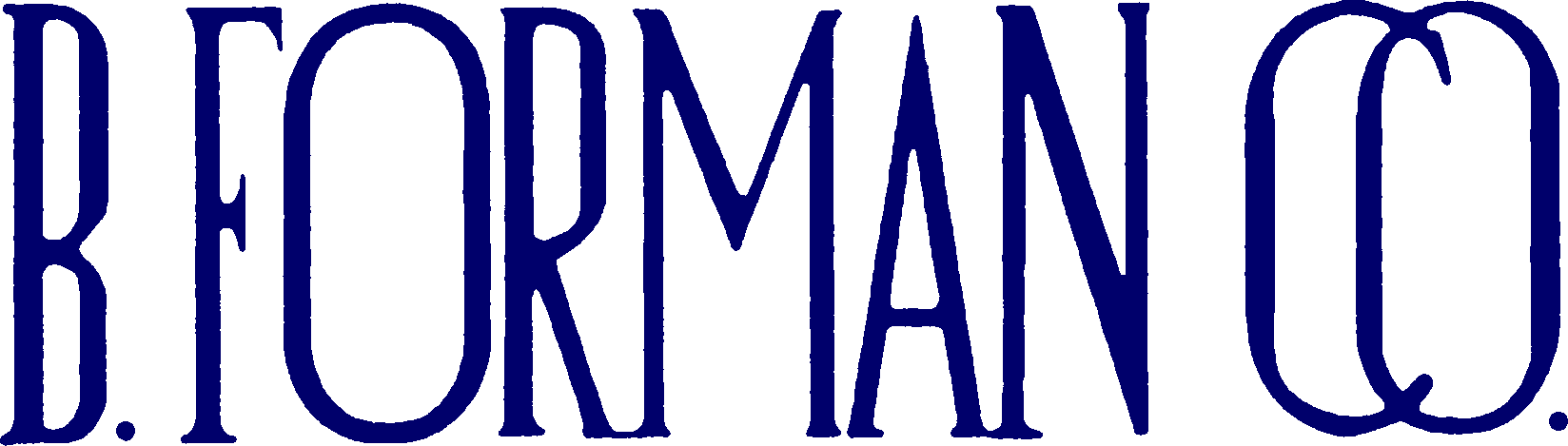
- Company type: Department Store
- Industry: retailing
- Founded: Rochester, New York, United States (1911)
- Founder: Benjamin Forman
- Defunct: 1994
- Fate: Acquired by McCurdy's
- Successor: Kaufmann's (1990–2006); Macy's (2006–present); The Bon-Ton
- Key people: Edward Forman
- Products: clothing, merchandise,

B. Forman Co. was a retail store in Rochester, New York, specializing primarily in high-end women's clothing. Once the largest store of its kind between New York and Chicago, the company, founded by Benjamin Forman in the first decade of the twentieth century, closed in 1994. B. Forman Co., along with McCurdy & Co., created Rochester's Midtown Plaza.

== Founder ==
Benjamin Forman, founder of B. Forman Co., was born August 29, 1874. His passport application of 1921 lists his birthplace as "Lemburg, Austria" and his father as Abraham Forman. His birthplace is likely Lviv, now located in the western part of Ukraine but, in the 19th century, in the Austrian Empire. Various United States Census reports list his native language as Yiddish. His 1921 passport application lists him as having immigrated to the United States October 10, 1891.

== Early tailor shop ==
According to a Democrat and Chronicle story in 2016, Forman moved from New York to Philadelphia, Ithaca and Syracuse before arriving in Rochester in 1902. Forman does not appear in the Rochester City Directory until 1904.

Vienna Tailors, described as "mammoth ladies' tailoring establishment" at 255 E. Main Street, Rochester, by the Democrat and Chronicle newspaper in 1902, had been founded by A. Edelberg who, upon retirement, turned the business over to Noah Kahn.

Benjamin Foreman was associated with the tailor shop at 255 East Main Street, Rochester, by 1903. An advertisement for "The Vienna Tailors" listed the proprietors as Lessen, Foreman, and Rocker. The same advertisement warned: "Do not confound us with the persons who formerly ran a business here under our name. Don't be deceived, there is but one place of our name in each city, and that is conducted by the undersigned who guarantee satisfaction or no sale." The 1903 Rochester City Directory lists the partners as M. Lessen, B. Forman and I. Rocker; Max Lessen is listed as living in Syracuse and Isadore Rocker as living in Ithaca.

This tailor shop was renamed B. Forman a year later. He moved his shop, "B. Forman's, Ladies' Tailor", to the second floor of 42 North Clinton Avenue April 1, 1906, next to the new Sibley, Lindsay & Curr department store.

== B. Forman Store ==
Mr. Forman opened a new ready-to-wear store at 50 South Clinton Avenue in 1911. A store advertisement claimed that "every garment will be properly fitted by Mr. Forman personally. The same supervision that is exercised in the made-to-measure department will also be exercised in the ready-to-wear department." Later that year, Foreman purchased a building lot next door (46 South Clinton Street) and announced plans to construct a three-story retail store, 38 feet fronting Clinton, and extending back to Cortland Street, 197 feet deep. The new store, now called "B. Forman Co." opened August 22, 1912. The South Clinton block was, until then, primarily lined with residential houses.

Benjamin Forman's first wife, Dorah, died in December 1915. He married his second wife, Raye Greenberg, two years later. They moved from 15 Harper Street to 224 Edgerton Street that same year. Raye Foreman died March 20, 1944. When he died, Benjamin Forman was survived by a third wife, Belle Friedman Forman.

Saks & Co. and Gimbel Brothers of New York City attempted, unsuccessfully, to entice Forman to come to New York in a management role in 1923.

B. Forman Co. was a founding member of a trade association, the retail Research Association. Other members included Abraham & Straus of Brooklyn, L. S. Ayers of Indianapolis, L. Bamberger of Newark; Filene's of Boston, Joseph Horne Co. of Pittsburgh, Hudson Company of Detroit, Hutzler Brothers of Baltimore, Rike-Kumler Company of Dayton, Strawbridge & Clothier of Philadelphia, and Wm. Taylor Sons of Cleveland.

In 1925, Benjamin Forman opened "Camp Forman", a 22-acre vacation and recreation center for employees of the company, in Pultneyville, New York. The property became the first public park of Wayne County, New York, in 1955.

There was a major expansion of the store in 1925, including a six-story office tower in the back end of the store.

B. Forman expanded the South Clinton store again in 1941, taking over half of the lot to the north that was the previous location of the Lyceum Theater. This expansion increased the sales area by 40%. The Clinton Avenue frontage of the store was remade in limestone, to harmonize the new and old frontage.

The store expanded again ten years later, taking over the other half of the old Lyceum lot. The store then fronted 200 feet on Clinton Avenue. The store featured some 50 individual 'shops', with separate buyers, each with a different theme. There were twelve separate 'shops' for dresses alone. The store was reported in the Democrat and Chronicle newspaper to be the largest woman's specialty store between New York City and Chicago, the first store in the country to install escalators, and the first in Rochester to be fully air conditioned.

Benjamin Forman died March 23, 1951, at his apartment in the Sheridan Hotel, 111 East Avenue.

Edward Forman, Benjamin's oldest son, had taken over as President of the company in 1946. He was born in 1899, served in France during World War I, and joined the B. Forman staff in 1924. He died, unexpectedly, on a trip to New York City January 13, 1953. He was then succeeded as president by his brother, Maurice Forman. Another brother, attorney Frederick Forman, served as Treasurer. Leo Mans, a French immigrant, served as Display Director from 1917 to his death in 1955.

== Retail expansion ==
The store began expanding with branch locations in the 1950s. A children's clothing store was created at Monroe Avenue and Glen Ellen Way, in suburban Brighton and a 40,000 sq. ft. store was built at Culver Ridge Plaza, Irondequoit, New York The Irondequoit store opened March 5, 1957.

The most bold venture of the B. Forman Co. was the creation of an indoor shopping mall in Downtown Rochester. Announced in September 1958, this was a joint venture of B. Forman and McCurdy's Department Store. The rear of both downtown stores were near each other, off of Cortland Street. The Midtown Plaza project enclosed Courtland, creating a two-story indoor mall, with the two stores now facing each other inside the mall. Early tenants, in addition to B. Forman Co. and McCurdy's, included Wegmans, Lincoln Rochester Bank (now Chase Bank), the United States Postal Service and Trailways, as well as several national and local chain stores. The mall opened April 10, 1962.

B. Forman Co. announced two additional stores for suburban Rochester in early 1967, one at Pittsford Plaza, Pittsford, New York and the other at Long Ridge Plaza (now Greece Ridge) in Greece, NY The small Young World store on Monroe Avenue, Brighton, was closed and its retail operation moved to the new Pittsford Plaza store in 1968 The Pittsford store opened March 5, 1968. The Greece store, in Long Ridge Mall (now Greece Ridge) did not open until September 15, 1971.

== End of Forman family ownership ==
Forman family ownership of the company came to a bitter end in 1967. After the death of Benjamin and Edward Forman, the company was equally owned by Maurice and Frederick Forman. Fred died, unexpectedly, in 1963 at age 57. His half interest in the company was inherited in trust by his widow, Sally (Bresler) Forman and their son, Jay W. Gilbert.

Differences between Maurice Forman and his brother's widow broke out into the open when she filed a lawsuit seeking to dissolve the company. Creditors of the Fred Forman Estate, including Maurice Forman, filed a petition opposing the dissolution on the grounds that funds might not be sufficient to pay $850,000 (~$6.08 million in 2024) in estate debts. The petition noted that B. Forman Co. had offered to purchase the interest of Fred Forman for $1,425,000 twice. Mrs. Forman contended the value of her husband's interest in the company was $2.2 million Charges and counter-charges were made between the warring parties, including a hearing at Surrogate's Court April 1967 The bitter dispute was resolved when McCurdy's purchased the stock of the B. Forman Co. in 1968. The company continued to operate as an autonomous operation of the McCurdy company.

In 1969, for the first time in its history, a non-family member took over as President of B. Forman Co., Joseph E. Morressy. Maurice Forman became Chair of the B. Forman board. Morressy succeeded Maurice Forman as board chair in 1974, and Pete C. Merrill, a Vice President of McCurdy's, was named new President of B. Forman Co.

Under Merrill, the company launched a new concept of creating a mini-store, called "B. Forman II", the first of which opened in Irondequoit Shopping Plaza May 1977, and the second in Perinton Square Mall October 1, 1979. The Irondequoit B. Forman II apparently closed the summer of 1981, as it was listed in Forman ads through July, but not by September. The "B.Forman II" name was last used in advertising for the Perinton Square store in April 1983

The last Rochester area B. Forman Co. store opened at Marketplace Mall October 1982. The company then looked outside of Rochester, acquiring two stores in Syracuse from Flah's. Two years later, the company bought the Flah company, acquiring seven more stores in New York State: three in Albany, and one each in Schenectady, Poughkeepsie, Middletown and Kingston.

== Contraction and closing ==
Pete C. Merrill retired as President of B. Forman Co. in 1987. He was replaced by Larry W. Hinkle, who resigned four years later. Gilbert K. 'Ken' McCurdy, Executive Vice President of McCurdy's, stepped in as interim President. Bernard Zindler was brought in as president in April 1992. He reported to McCurdy & Co. President and CEO Thomas E. Dokter. Zindler resigned as President January 1994.

B. Forman Co. last new store opened at the Carousel Center in Syracuse in 1990. B. Forman Co. unsuccessfully attempted to purchase the Bonwit Teller store in Buffalo's Galleria Mall in 1990.

However, the company faced serious problems and closed five stores in 1992, the Long Ridge, Greece and Culver Ridge, Irondequoit stores as well as former Flah stores in Colonie, Poughkeepsie and Middletown. A year later, the company announced the closing of three more stores, including the small B. Forman II store at Perinton Mall as well as the Kingston and Carousel Center stores.

McCurdy & Co. borrowed $4.5 million in January 1994 from the City of Rochester, citing a need for working capital, and giving a mortgage on the McCurdy Midtown building as security. And in July 1994, McCurdy's and B. Forman Co. closed. It was announced that four McCurdy locations would be sold to the May Company, and all B. Forman C. stores would be closed. The going-out-of-business sale at McCurdy's and B. Forman started a few days later. The B. Forman stores were closed by the end of August.

An announcement of an intention to relaunch a 'hybrid' B. Forman store in Midtown Plaza in November 1994, backed by Rochester developer E. Anthony Wilson and investors he recruited, was announced in September. Merchandise was to be provided by Bonwit Teller. A hiring announcement was printed in October. and the new store opened Nov. 25. The 'new' B. Forman store closed fourteen months later. A few months later, the discount store Peebles took over the Midtown space, the location where Benjamin Forman had started his ready-to-ware business in 1911.

Barnes & Noble took over the former Pittsford Plaza B. Forman Co. building in 1995. The B. Forman building at Midtown Plaza was demolished starting Oct. 18, 2010.
