= The Mall at Greece Ridge =

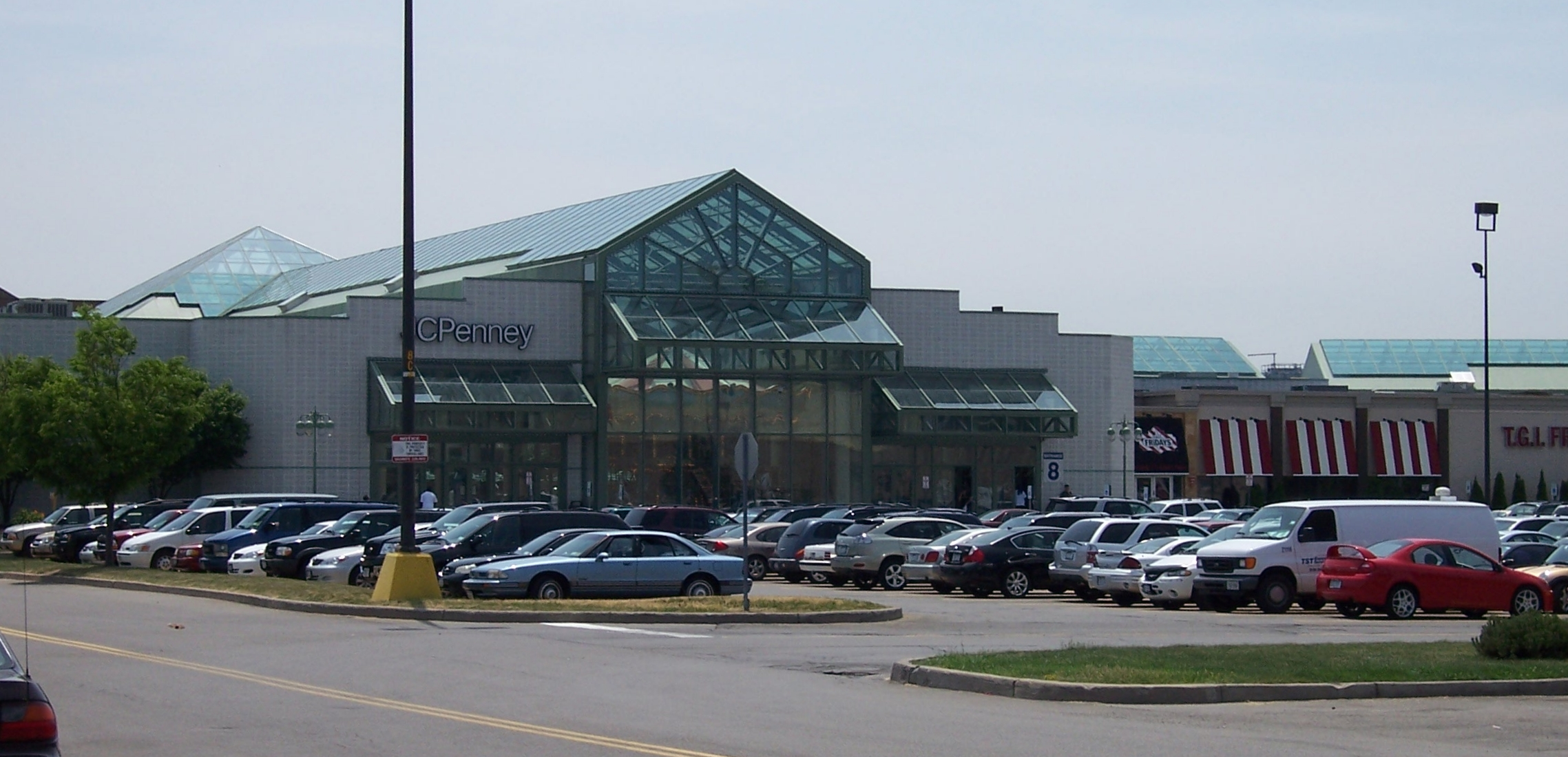
- Location: Greece, New York
- Coordinates: 43.207287°N 77.692051°W
- Opened: May 1, 1967; 59 years ago (as Greece Town Mall); October 2, 1969; 57 years ago (as Long Ridge Mall); March 15, 1994; 32 years ago (combined as The Mall at Greece Ridge Center)
- Developer: Wilmorite Properties
- Manager: Wilmorite Properties
- Owner: Wilmorite Properties
- Num. of stores: 112
- Num. of anchor tenants: 9 (7 open, 2 vacant)
- Floor area: 1,208,488 sq ft (112,272 m^{2})
- Floors: 1 (2 in JCPenney and both former Macy's and Macy's Home Store, second floor offices and stockrooms in Boscov's)
- Website: http://www.themallatgreeceridge.com/

The Mall at Greece Ridge is located in Greece, New York, a suburb of Rochester, New York. It is managed by Wilmorite Properties. It contains 107 stores and restaurants in the main concourse. The mall's anchors are JCPenney, Boscov's, Dick's Sporting Goods, Apple Cinemas, Goodwill, StoreEase Self Storage, and a free-standing Target. Junior anchors are Burlington, Marshalls, Michaels, and Barnes and Noble. There are two vacant anchor buildings, formerly occupied by Macy's and Macy's Home Store. It also features a double-decker carousel.

The mall is near the center of a long line of plazas, chain hotels, restaurants, and car dealerships that continues for several miles in each direction on Ridge Road (New York State Route 104).

== History ==
The mall complex began as two entirely separate adjacent shopping malls, Greece Towne Mall and Long Ridge Plaza. Greece Towne Mall opened on May 1, 1967, with a Sibley's department store and 13 other stores. By the end of the year, all 46 stores at the mall had opened.

McCurdy's department store, a competitor of Sibley's, opened a freestanding store nearby on October 2, 1969. The Long Ridge Plaza shopping center was built around it, and opened on September 15, 1971. The new mall contained three additional anchor stores: Woolworth, J. B. Hunter, and B. Forman Co. A fifth anchor store, Sears, opened on February 1, 1972. J. B. Hunter closed in 1974, and JCPenney opened in its place in September 1975.

In 1982, a new wing was added at Greece Towne Mall, with a Gold Circle (later Hills, and then Caldor.) In the late 1980s, talks to link the two malls to draw shoppers back to Greece escalated, when new malls opened in Irondequoit and Henrietta and when plans for a massive expansion of Eastview Mall were revealed. Wilmorite, which had developed Greece Towne Mall, acquired Long Ridge Plaza in 1989, and spent about $60 million on the merger of the two malls, with a new 300,000 square feet (28,000 m^{2}) connecting wing. Sibley's was renamed Kaufmann's in 1990.

On March 15, 1994, the new combined mall opened as The Mall at Greece Ridge Center. At 1.6 million square feet (150,000 m^{2}), it was the 4th largest mall in the eastern United States, and the 20th largest in the country. The mall is still the largest shopping center in the Rochester area.

JCPenney moved from its original location to a newly built anchor store, which opened on May 4, 1994, in the new wing. The old JCPenney was divided into a Burlington Coat Factory and a Lechmere, both of which opened in 1995. Woolworth's closed and was replaced by Dick's Sporting Goods in August 1994.

McCurdy's closed in 1994 and the chain was sold to The May Company, which rebranded all stores as Kaufmann's, giving the mall two of their stores. The Bon-Ton filed an anti-trust lawsuit against The May Company, for not being able to go into the Rochester area. The May Company settled with The Bon-Ton, allowing them to buy all the former McCurdy's stores, except the Long Ridge Mall location. Kaufmann's moved from the former Sibley's to the McCurdy's space, while The Bon-Ton took over the Sibley's space.

Caldor went out of business in 1996, and their anchor store was demolished and replaced with a Hoyts Cinema, which opened in 1998, before rebranding to Regal Cinemas in 2004. Lechmere went out of business in 1997 and Burlington moved downstairs, to the former Lechmere location, in 2005. In 2006, the mall's name was shortened to The Mall at Greece Ridge, dropping the word Center. That same year, Kaufmann's was rebranded as Macy's. In 2012, The Bon-Ton anchor store closed and was demolished. It was replaced with a new wing of the mall, completed in 2014.

The Sears anchor store closed in 2018. It was replaced by a True Storage self-storage facility managed by CubeSmart in 2024. On September 1, 2026, True Storage sold the facility to Greece NY Storage PropCo LLC, an affiliate of Glacier Global Partners, and became managed by StoreEase.

On January 19, 2023, it was announced that Regal Cinemas would close, as a result of the economic impact of the COVID-19 pandemic. Apple Cinemas renovated the space and reopened it on March 14, 2025.

In 2024, Burlington moved from their anchor building to a smaller in-line space in the mall, formerly occupied by Bed Bath & Beyond.

Macy's closed both of their anchor stores on March 23, 2025. 5 days later, Boscov's announced they would open a new anchor store including the former Burlington location, and an expansion across the full width of the mall, to Entrance 6. The owner of Jim's at the Mall, a popular diner next to entrance 6, refused to relocate, resulting in a change.org petition. The Boscov's store was constructed and is set to open in the Fall of 2025, the chain's first location in the Rochester area. The store opened on October 30, 2025.
