= Greece (CDP), New York =

Greece, New York
- Census-designated place
- Location in Monroe County and the state of New York

- Location of New York in the United States
- Coordinates: 43°12′32″N 77°42′01″W
- Country: United States
- State: New York
- County: Monroe
- Town: Greece

Area
  - Total: 4.37 sq mi (11.33 km^{2})
  - Land: 4.37 sq mi (11.33 km^{2})
  - Water: 0 sq mi (0.00 km^{2})
- Elevation: 426 ft (130 m)

Population (2020)
  - Total: 14,429
  - Density: 3,299.4/sq mi (1,273.89/km^{2})
- Time zone: UTC-5 (EST)
  - Summer (DST): UTC-4 (EDT)
- ZIP Code: 14626
- Area code: 585
- FIPS code: 36-30279

Greece is a suburban community and census-designated place (CDP) within the town of Greece in Monroe County, New York, United States. The population of the CDP was 14,429 at the 2020 census, out of 96,926 in the entire town of Greece. It is a suburb of the city of Rochester.

== Geography ==
The Greece CDP is in the southern part of the town of Greece, 6 miles (10 km) northwest of downtown Rochester. New York State Route 104 (Ridge Road) passes through the center of the community, leading east 4 miles (6 km) into the northern part of Rochester and west 12 miles (19 km) to Clarkson. Route 390, the western freeway around Rochester, passes just east of the Greece CDP, with access from Exit 24 (Route 104).

According to the U.S. Census Bureau, the Greece CDP has a total area of 4.37 square miles (11.32 km^{2}), all land.

== Demographics ==
Historical population
Census	Pop.	Note	%±
1980	16,177		—
1990	15,632		−3.4%
2000	14,614		−6.5%
2010	14,519		−0.7%
2020	14,429		−0.6%

As of the census of 2000, there were 14,614 people, 6,004 households, and 4,010 families residing in the CDP. The population density was 3,374.2 inhabitants per square mile (1,302.8/km^{2}). There were 6,170 housing units at an average density of 1,424.6 per square mile (550.0/km^{2}). The racial makeup of the CDP was 94.06% White, 2.50% Black or African American, 0.18% Native American, 1.65% Asian, 0.03% Pacific Islander, 0.72% from other races, and 0.86% from two or more races. Hispanic or Latino of any race were 2.44% of the population.

There were 6,004 households, out of which 26.5% had children under the age of 18 living with them, 53.7% were married couples living together, 9.3% had a female householder with no husband present, and 33.2% were non-families. 29.0% of all households were made up of individuals, and 14.3% had someone living alone who was 65 years of age or older. The average household size was 2.40 and the average family size was 2.97.

In the CDP, the population was spread out, with 21.7% under the age of 18, 6.6% from 18 to 24, 25.7% from 25 to 44, 25.7% from 45 to 64, and 20.2% who were 65 years of age or older. The median age was 42 years. For every 100 females, there were 90.0 males. For every 100 females age 18 and over, there were 85.1 males.

The median income for a household in the CDP was $45,110, and the median income for a family was $54,608. Males had a median income of $40,199 versus $29,796 for females. The per capita income for the CDP was $22,129. About 2.8% of families and 4.3% of the population were below the poverty line, including 6.7% of those under age 18 and 5.6% of those age 65 or over.
