= Eastview Mall =

Coordinates: 43.029°N 77.444°W

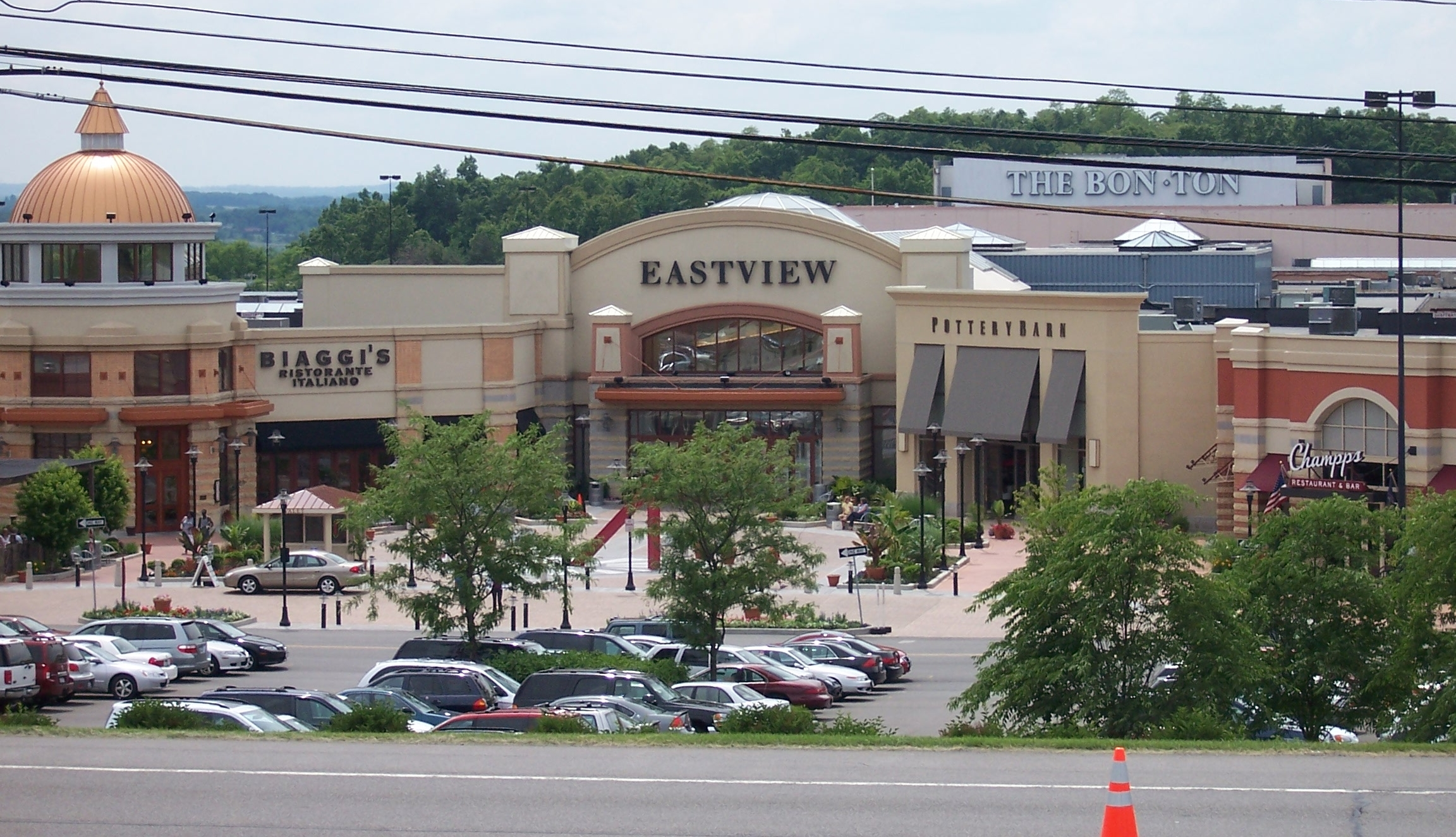
- "A Higher Form of Shopping"
- Location: Victor, New York
- Opened: 1971; 55 years ago
- Developer: Wilmorite Properties
- Manager: Wilmorite Properties
- Owner: Wilmorite Properties
- Num. of stores: 144
- Num. of anchor tenants: 5 (4 open, 1 under construction)
- Floor area: 1,375,097 sq ft (127,751 m^{2})
- Floors: 1 (2 in JCPenney, Macy's, and Von Maur)
- Website: eastviewmall.com

Eastview Mall, located in Victor, New York (near Rochester, New York), is a regional indoor shopping center owned and managed by Wilmorite Properties. The mall features JCPenney, Macy's, Von Maur, Dick's House of Sport, and Bass Pro Shops.

Eastview is located just off New York State Thruway (Interstate 90) Exit 45 on New York State Route 96. This 1,375,097-square-foot (127,751 m^{2}) shopping center has 144 stores and services including some that are unique to the Rochester-area market. Eastview Mall serves the entire Metro-Rochester, NY region, attracting customers from throughout Western NY, as well as visitors to the nearby Finger Lakes.

== History ==
Originally proposed for a site in Monroe County but shifted to neighboring Ontario County following strong local opposition, construction on what was originally called the Great Eastern Mall began in 1969. Renamed Eastview Mall, the first phase of the project opened in 1971. Original anchor tenants were Sibley's and Sears. An expansion a year later added McCurdy's. It was expanded in 1995 with the addition of a wing anchored by Lord & Taylor and JCPenney, and then expanded once more at the main entrance in 2003. In November 2011, it was announced that department store retailer The Bon-Ton would shutter its location. It was later announced that upscale department store retailer Von Maur would be building a 140,000 square foot anchor store in its place.

A PacSun at the mall opened in 1998 and closed in 2012. It returned in 2024.

In January 2013, the mall's H&M closed. It returned eight years later in 2021.

In 2017, a Tesla supercharging station was added in the mall parking lot.

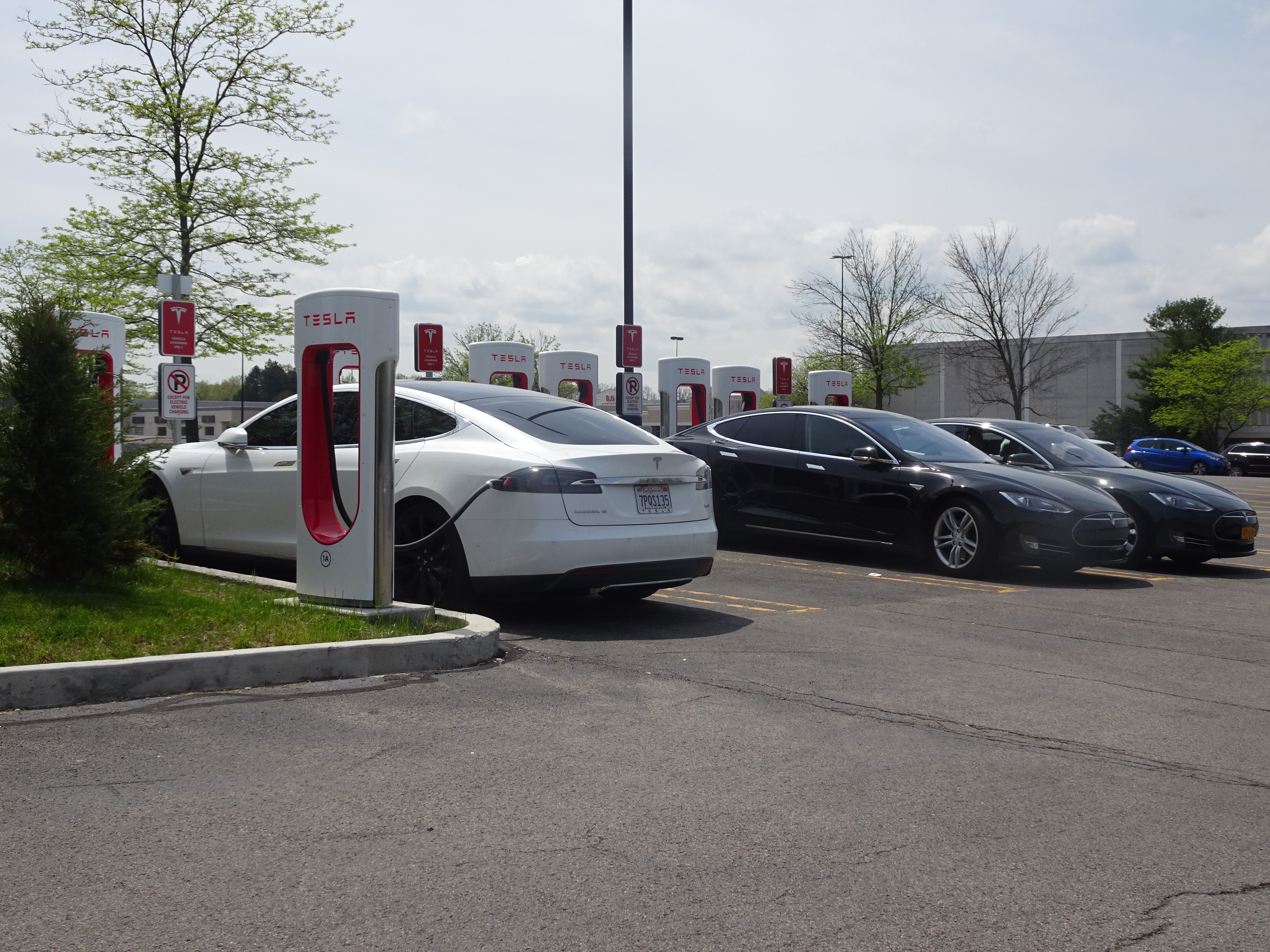
Tesla Supercharging station added in 2017

In August, 2018, it was announced the Sears anchor store would close. Plans were announced to develop Dick's House of Sport, a new concept by Dick's Sporting Goods. Plans for a skating rink were later announced to be attached to the store.

In August 2020, the Lord & Taylor chain went out of business, due to the economic impact of the COVID-19 pandemic. Wilmorite, the mall development firm, proposed that the previous Lord & Taylor anchor store be reconstructed for an unnamed "environmentally friendly home goods and clothing retailer," as well as a family owned grocery. On October 21, 2025, it was announced that Bass Pro Shops would open in the former Lord & Taylor space in late 2026.
