= List of largest shopping malls in New York =

== List of largest enclosed malls ==
#	Mall name	City	Region	Retail space Square feet (ft²)	Stores	Anchor stores/entertainment venues	Year opened	Ownership
1	Destiny USA	Syracuse, New York	Syracuse	2,400,000 square feet (220,000 m^{2})	239	Macy's, Nordstrom Rack, DSW Shoe Warehouse, Dick's Sporting Goods, Forever 21, Burlington, TJ Maxx, At Home, Regal Cinemas, Destiny USA Hotel, WonderWorks Destiny	1990	The Pyramid Companies
2	Roosevelt Field	Garden City, New York	Long Island	2,366,692 square feet (219,872.9 m^{2})	294	Macy's, Bloomingdale's, Nordstrom, JCPenney, Dick's Sporting Goods, Neiman Marcus, AMC	1956	Simon Property Group
3	Palisades Center	West Nyack, New York	Rockland	2,200,000 square feet (200,000 m^{2})	400	Barnes & Noble, Macy's, Target, AMC Theatres, Palisades Center Ice Rink, Palisades Climb Adventure Ropes Course, Lucky Strike West Nyack, Ferris Wheel, Carousel, Levity Live Comedy Club, 5 Wits, Dave & Buster's, Autobahn Indoor Speedway, Billy Beez	1998	The Pyramid Companies
4	Green Acres Mall	Valley Stream, New York	Long Island	2,081,000 square feet (193,300 m^{2})	174	Macy's (2 stores), Primark, Walmart, BJ's Wholesale Club	1956	Macerich
5	Crossgates Mall	Albany, New York	Albany	1,700,000 square feet (160,000 m^{2})	176	Macy's, JCPenney, Burlington, Best Buy, Dick's Sporting Goods, Forever 21, Regal Cinemas, Zara	1984	The Pyramid Companies
6	Walden Galleria	Cheektowaga, New York	Buffalo	1,600,000 square feet (150,000 m^{2})	193	Macy's, JCPenney, Best Buy, Dick's Sporting Goods, DSW, Forever 21, Kids For Less, Old Navy, Regal Cinemas, Primark	1989	The Pyramid Companies
7	The Mall at Greece Ridge	Greece, New York	Rochester	1,423,411 square feet (132,239.2 m^{2})	114	Macy's (2 stores), JCPenney, Dick's Sporting Goods, Bed Bath & Beyond, Barnes & Noble, Michaels, Burlington, Old Navy, Target	1967	Wilmorite Properties
8	Eastview Mall	Victor, New York	Rochester	1,361,325 square feet (126,471.2 m^{2})	156	Macy's, JCPenney, Von Maur, Dick's Sporting Goods	1971	Wilmorite Properties
9	Smith Haven Mall	Lake Grove, New York	Long Island	1,302,412 square feet (120,998.0 m^{2})	170	Macy's, Dick's Sporting Goods	1969	Simon Property Group
10	Colonie Center	Roessleville, New York	Albany	1,300,000 square feet (120,000 m^{2})	110	Macy's, Boscov's, Regal Cinemas, Christmas Tree Shops, Whole Foods Market	1966	KKR & Co. L.P. & Colonie Pacific
11	Staten Island Mall	Staten Island, New York	New York City	1,258,042 square feet (116,875.9 m^{2})	205	Macy's, JCPenney, Primark	1973	Brookfield Properties
12	Broadway Commons	Hicksville, New York	Long Island	1,200,000 square feet (110,000 m^{2})	98	Target, IKEA	1956	Pacific Retail
13	Galleria at Crystal Run	Wallkill, New York	Hudson Valley	1,200,000 square feet (110,000 m^{2})	120	Macy's, JCPenney, Target, Dick's Sporting Goods, Gold's Gym, Urban Air Adventure Park	1992	The Pyramid Companies
14	Poughkeepsie Galleria	Poughkeepsie, New York	Hudson Valley	1,200,000 square feet (110,000 m^{2})	123	Target, Dick's Sporting Goods, Macy's, Best Buy, DSW	1987	The Pyramid Companies
15	Kings Plaza	Brooklyn, New York	New York City	1,138,000 square feet (105,700 m^{2})	150	Macy's, Primark, Burlington, Zara, Best Buy, Lowe's	1970	Macerich
16	Walt Whitman Shops	Huntington Station, New York	Long Island	1,084,827 square feet (100,783.7 m^{2})	105	Macy's, Bloomingdale's, Saks Fifth Avenue	1962	Simon Property Group
17	Arnot Mall	Big Flats, New York	Upstate	1,003,700 square feet (93,250 m^{2})	97	JCPenney, Burlington	1967	Urban Retail Properties
18	South Shore Mall	Bay Shore, New York	Long Island	996,738 square feet (92,600.0 m^{2})	140	Macy's, JCPenney, Dick's Sporting Goods	1963	Namdar Realty Group
19	Queens Center Mall	Queens, New York	New York City	964,000 square feet (89,600 m^{2})	198	Macy's, JCPenney	1973	Macerich
20	Oakdale Commons	Johnson City, New York	Upstate	963,475 square feet (89,509.8 m^{2})	66	Dick's Sporting Goods, BJs Wholesale Club, JCPenney, Dave & Busters (opening 2024)	1975	JFM Real Estate
21	Via Port Rotterdam	Rotterdam, New York	Albany	900,000 square feet (84,000 m^{2})	58	Shoe Department, Via Entertainment, Via Aquarium, New York State Department of Taxation Call Center, United Auto Supply	1988	Via Properties
22	Sangertown Square	New Hartford, New York	Upstate	880,000 square feet (82,000 m^{2})	70	Target, Dick's Sporting Goods, Boscov's, DSW, HomeGoods	1980	The Pyramid Companies
23	The Westchester	White Plains, New York	Westchester	800,564 square feet (74,374.8 m^{2})	133	Neiman Marcus, Crate & Barrel, Nordstrom	1995	Simon Property Group
24	McKinley Mall	Hamburg, New York	Buffalo	800,000 square feet (74,000 m^{2})	75	JCPenney, Barnes & Noble, Bed Bath & Beyond, Best Buy	1985	Kohan Retail Investment Group
25	The Mall at Bay Plaza	The Bronx, New York	New York City	780,000 square feet (72,000 m^{2})	80	Macy's, JCPenney	2014 (August 14, 2014)	Prestige Bay Plaza Development Corporation
26	Hudson Valley Mall	Kingston, New York	Hudson Valley	765,704 square feet (71,136.2 m^{2})	30	Target, Dick's Sporting Goods	1981	Hull Property Group
27	Wilton Mall	Wilton, New York	Upstate	763,270 square feet (70,910 m^{2})	86	JCPenney, Dick's Sporting Goods, HomeGoods, Bow Tie Cinemas	1990	Macerich
28	Salmon Run Mall	Watertown, New York	Upstate	678,118 square feet (62,999.2 m^{2})	83	JCPenney, Dick's Sporting Goods, Burlington, Best Buy, Regal Cinemas	1986	The Pyramid Companies
29	Clifton Park Center	Clifton Park, New York	Albany	660,000 square feet (61,000 m^{2})	72	JCPenney, Boscov's, Marshalls/HomeGoods, Regal Cinemas	1976	DCG Development
30	Aviation Mall	Glens Falls North, New York	Upstate	630,000 square feet (59,000 m^{2})	53	JCPenney, Target, Dick's Sporting Goods, Olie's Bargain Outlet, Peter Harris, Regal Cinemas, Planet Fitness	1975	The Pyramid Companies
31	The Shops at Ithaca Mall	Lansing, New York	Upstate	622,920 square feet (57,871 m^{2})	68	Dick's Sporting Goods, Target, Regal Cinemas, Best Buy, Ulta Beauty, Old Navy, Michaels	1976	Namdar Realty Group
32	Champlain Centre	Plattsburgh, New York	Upstate	610,500 square feet (56,720 m^{2})	61	JCPenney, Target, Dick's Sporting Goods, Beat Buy, DSW, Hobby Lobby, Kohl's, Regal Cinemas	1987	The Pyramid Companies
33	Jefferson Valley Mall	Yorktown Heights, New York	Hudson Valley	575,280 square feet (53,445 m^{2})	80	Macy's, Dick's Sporting Goods	1983	Washington Prime Group
34	Fingerlakes Mall	Aurelius, New York	Upstate	427,447 square feet (39,711.1 m^{2})	37	Bass Pro Shops	1980	Siba Management
35	Chautauqua Mall	Lakewood, New York	Upstate	425,000 square feet (39,500 m^{2})	50	JCPenney, OfficeMax, Planet Fitness, Jo-Ann Fabrics, Dipson Theatres	1971	Washington Prime Group
36	Newburgh Mall	Newburgh, New York	Hudson Valley	388,000 square feet (36,000 m^{2})	54	Sears, Office Depot	1980	Urban Retail Properties
37	Southside Mall	Oneonta, New York	Upstate	242,000 square feet (22,500 m^{2})	30	JCPenney, Dick's Sporting Goods, Harbor Freight, OfficeMax, TJ Maxx	1982	Fameco Real Estate

- Denotes urban mall.

== List of largest outlet malls ==
#	Mall name	City	Region	Retail space Square feet (ft²)	Stores	Anchor stores/entertainment venues	Year opened	Ownership
1	Woodbury Common Premium Outlets	Central Valley, New York	Orange County	899,088	240		1985	Simon Property Group
2	Tanger Outlets Deer Park	Deer Park, New York	Long Island	741,981			2008	Tanger Factory Outlet Centers
3	Tanger Outlets Riverhead	Riverhead, New York	Long Island	729,734			1994	Tanger Factory Outlet Centers
4	Fashion Outlets of Niagara Falls USA	Niagara Falls, New York	Niagara Falls	708,000			1982	Macerich
5	Waterloo Premium Outlets	Waterloo, New York	New York	421,200	100		1995	Simon Property Group
6	Empire Outlets	Staten Island, New York	Staten Island	350,000	100		2019	BFC Partners
7	Bellport Outlet Stores	Bellport, New York	Long Island	124,215	16		1992	Sunrise Station LLC
8	The Outlets at Lake George	Lake George, New York	Lake George	102,000			1986	Factory Outlets of Lake George; David Kenney
9	Adirondack Outlet Mall	Lake George, New York	Lake George	76,000				Factory Outlets of Lake George; David Kenney
10	The Outlet Shoppes of Lake George	Lake George, New York	Lake George	60,000			2014	David Kenney
11	French Mountain Commons	Lake George, New York	Lake George					Factory Outlets of Lake George; Ed Moore
12	Log Jam	Lake George, New York	Lake George					Factory Outlets of Lake George; Ed Moore

== List of largest lifestyle and power centers ==
#	Mall name	City	Region	Retail space Square feet (ft²)	Stores	Anchor stores/entertainment venues	Year opened	Ownership
1	Westchester's Ridge Hill	Yonkers, New York	Westchester	1,300,000	50	Dick's Sporting Goods, Lowe's, Whole Foods Market, TJ Maxx, Showcase Cinemas, Legoland Discovery Centre	October 20, 2011	Queensland Investment Corporation
2	Bay Plaza Shopping Center	The Bronx, New York	New York City	1,252,682	50	Kmart, Marshalls, AMC	1988	Prestige Bay Plaza Development Corporation
3	Cross County Shopping Center	Yonkers, New York	Westchester	1,000,000	50	Macy's, Target (opening 2021)	1954	Brooks Shopping Centers
4	The Shops & Restaurants at Hudson Yards*	Manhattan, New York	New York City	1,000,000 square feet (93,000 m^{2})	100		2019 (March 15, 2019)	Oxford Properties Group Inc.
5	Rego Center***	Queens, New York	New York City	958,557	28	TJ Maxx, Marshall's, Costco, Burlington, IKEA, At Home (opening 2021)	March 3, 2010	Urban Edge Proprrties
6	Bronx Terminal Market***	The Bronx, New York	New York City	913,000	21	Target, Home Depot, Best Buy	September 1, 2009	The Related Companies
7	Nanuet Town Centre	Nanuet, New York	Rockland	757,928	240		October 10, 2013	Simon Property Group
8	Gateway Center	Brooklyn, New York	New York City	638,000	51	BJ's Wholesale Club, Home Depot, Bed, Bath & Beyond, Target, Best Buy	October 1, 2002	The Related Companies
9	The Shops at Skyview Center	Queens, New York	New York City	559,978	37	Target, BJ's Wholesale Club, Best Buy, Marshalls	2010	ShopCore Properties
10	East River Plaza***	Manhattan, New York	New York City	527,000	15	Target, Costco, Burlington	November 12, 2009	Forest City Ratner
11	Queens Place Mall**	Queens, New York	New York City	440,000 square feet (41,000 m^{2})	15	Best Buy, DSW, Target	1965	Madison International Realty
12	The Shops at Columbus Circle*	Manhattan, New York	New York City	430,556 square feet (40,000.0 m^{2})	50	Whole Foods Market, Williams Sonoma	2003 (February 27, 2003)	The Related Companies
13	Atlantic Terminal*	Brooklyn, New York	New York City	370,000 square feet (34,000 m^{2})	35	Target, Best Buy, Marshalls	2004 (September 7, 2004)	Madison International Realty
14	The Shops at Atlas Park	Queens, New York	New York City	370,000	50	TJ Maxx, Regal Cinemas, Ashley Homestore	April 27, 2006	Macerich
15	City Center at White Plains**	White Plains, New York	Westchester	363,103 square feet (33,733.4 m^{2})	20	Target, Nordstrom Rack, Burlington Coat Factory	2003	Kite Realty
16	Westfield World Trade Center*	Manhattan, New York	New York City	326,146 square feet (30,300.0 m^{2})	116	Victoria's Secret, Apple Store	2016 (August 16, 2016)	Unibail-Rodamco-Westfield
17	The Source at White Plains**	White Plains, New York	Westchester	265,000 square feet (24,600 m^{2})	6	Dick's Sporting Goods, Raymour & Flanigan, Whole Foods Market	2004	The Wilder Companies
18	The Mall at Cross County*	Yonkers, New York	Westchester	263,567 square feet (24,486.2 m^{2})	13		1986	Aac Cross County Mall Llc
19	Americana Manhasset	Manhasset, New York	Long Island	220,000	66		1956	Castagna Realty

== List of strip malls ==
Mall name	City	Region	Retail space Square feet (ft²)	Stores	Anchor stores/entertainment venues	Year opened	Ownership
Caesar's Bay Shopping Center	Brooklyn, New York	New York City	300,000	14	Kohl's, Target, Best Buy	1961	Gazit Globe
The Shops at Northern Boulevard	Queens, New York	New York City	218,009	10	Marshalls	1996	NAI Global
Plaza 48	Queens, New York	New York City	129,790	6	David's Bridal	1980	Heidenberg Properties

== Former shopping malls ==
The following shopping malls have been demolished or closed. Some have been replaced by new strip plazas or re-developed for non-retail uses:

Mall name	City	Region	Retail space Square feet (ft²)	Stores	Anchor stores/entertainment venues	Year opened	Year closed	Ownership	Notes
Boulevard Mall	Amherst, New York	Buffalo	902,000 square feet (83,800 m^{2})	77	Macy's, JCPenney	1962	2026	Forest City Enterprises	The interior concourse officially closed on February 3, 2026. Demolition is expected to begin this spring to make way for a mixed-use "town center" by Benderson Development.
Cohoes Commons*	Cohoes, New York	Albany	120,000 square feet (11,000 m^{2})			1987	2000	National Enterprises	A small urban enclosed mall that failed early on. It was converted into office space and light industrial use decades ago.
Camillus Mall	Camillus, New York	Syracuse	450,000 square feet (42,000 m^{2})			1964	2003	Wilmorite Properties	The site is now Camillus Commons, an open-air center anchored by a Super Walmart and Lowe’s.
Penn-Can Mall	Cicero, New York	Syracuse	762,962 square feet (70,881.5 m^{2})			1976	1996	Winmar	While it is technically "enclosed," it is no longer a traditional retail mall. It is now a massive automotive "mall" housing dozens of car dealerships, along with some cafes and office spaces.
Eastern Hills Mall	Harris Hill, New York	Buffalo	997,945 square feet (92,712.1 m^{2})	75	JCPenney, Raymour & Flanigan	1971	2024	Mountain Development Corp., Uniland Development	The interior was shuttered in 2024. Redevelopment into "Eastern Hills Town Center" is underway, planning for 1,500 residential units and a "walkable village" feel.
Fairmount Fair	Fairmount, New York	Syracuse	380,000 square feet (35,000 m^{2})				1964		It was converted into an open-air plaza decades ago.
Fayetteville Mall	Fayetteville, New York	Syracuse	500,000 square feet (46,000 m^{2})			1974	1999		It was replaced by the Towne Center at Fayetteville, a successful open-air lifestyle center with Target, Kohl's, and L.L. Bean.
The Galleria at White Plains	White Plains, New York	Westchester	865,000 square feet (80,400 m^{2})	85		1980	2023	Pacific Retail Capital Partners	
Great Northern Mall	Clay, New York	Syracuse	891,000 square feet (82,800 m^{2})	56	Old Navy	1988	2022	Kohan Retail Investment Group	
Latham Circle Mall	Latham, New York	Albany	660,000 square feet (61,000 m^{2})			1957	2013	Eugene Weiss	It is now The Shoppes at Latham Circle, an open-air power center anchored by Walmart and Lowe's.
Manhattan Mall*	Manhattan, New York	New York City	243,000 square feet (22,600 m^{2})	40		1989		Vornado Realty Trust	
Long Ridge Mall	Greece, New York	Rochester	724,000 square feet (67,300 m^{2})			1971	1994		Long ago merged into its neighbor to create "The Mall at Greece Ridge."
The Marketplace Mall	Henrietta, New York	Rochester	1,001,041 square feet (92,999.8 m^{2})	40	JCPenney, Dick's Sporting Goods, Dave & Buster's	1982	2025	Wilmorite Properties	The site is now a medical/retail hybrid; while the URMC Orthopaedics campus and exterior stores (Dave & Buster's, JCPenney) remain open, the interior is being gutted.
Mohawk Mall	Niskayuna, New York	Albany	750,000 square feet (70,000 m^{2})	99		1970	2000	Myron M. Hunt, Inc., and Benderson Development Corp.	Replaced by an open-air lifestyle center called Mohawk Commons.
Irondequoit Mall	Irondequoit, New York	Rochester	1,000,000 square feet (93,000 m^{2})	110	JCPenney, Sears	1990	2009	Wilmorite Properties	Skyview on the Ridge is a future redevelopment that will replace the mall.
White Plains Mall*	White Plains, NY	Westchester	170,000 square feet (16,000 m^{2})			1972	2022		
New Rochelle Mall	New Rochelle, NY	Westchester	600,000 square feet (56,000 m^{2})	100		1968	1995		
Northway Mall	Colonie, New York	Albany	512,000 square feet (47,600 m^{2})			1970	1999	Mall Properties, Inc.	It is now the Northway Shopping Center, a massive open-air strip with Target, Marshalls, and PetSmart.
The Mall at the Source	East Garden City, NY	Long Island	750,000 square feet (70,000 m^{2})			1997	2018	Lesso Mall Development Long Island Inc.[2]	The new owners invested over $28 million to pivot away from traditional retail. Today, the space is a "Lifestyle and Entertainment Center" called Samanea New York Mall,
Nanuet Mall	Nanuet, NY	Rockland	900,000 square feet (84,000 m^{2})			1969	2011	Lesso Mall Development Long Island Inc.	Replaced by The Shops at Nanuet
ShoppingTown Mall	Dewitt, New York	Syracuse	988,054 square feet (91,793.2 m^{2})			1954	2020	Eagan Real Estate Inc.	
Sun Vet Mall	Holbrook, NY	Long Island	270,000 square feet (25,000 m^{2})			1974	2023	LBlumenfeld Development Group	
Sunrise Mall	East Massapequa, New York	Long Island	1,195,870 square feet (111,100 m^{2})	162	Dick's Sporting Goods	1973	2023	Urban Edge Properties	
Shops at West Seneca	West Seneca, New York	Buffalo	676,000 square feet (62,800 m^{2})			1969	1994	Pyramid Companies	The center was branded as a plaza called The Shops at West Seneca and its first tenant (Tops Markets) opened in May 1997 followed by Kmart in 2000.
St. Lawrence Centre	Massena, New York	Upstate	548,612 square feet (50,967.7 m^{2})	44	JCPenney	1990	2024	Shapiro Group	Converted to an industrial complex with storage facilities. Only JCPenney and Maurices left as retail tenants.
Summit Park Mall	Wheatfield, New York	Buffalo	800,000 square feet (74,000 m^{2})			1972	2009	Forest City Enterprises	
Champlain Centre South	Plattsburgh, New York	Upstate	400,000 square feet (37,000 m^{2})			1975	2000	The Pyramid Companies	The old Plattsburgh mall, originally Pyramid Mall Plattsburgh, opened in 1979 and was renamed Champlain Centre South when the new Champlain Centre North (now just Champlain Centre) opened in 1987; the old mall (South) was demolished in the late 1990s, not 1987, to expand the newer, main Champlain Centre.

'* Denotes urban mall
'** Denotes indoor power center
'*** Denotes vertical outdoor power center

== See also ==
- List of largest shopping malls in the United States
- List of shopping malls in New Jersey
- List of largest enclosed shopping malls in Canada
- List of largest shopping malls in the world
