= Driver's Village =

Auto row and former shopping mall in Cicero, New York, United States

- Interactive map of the Driver's Village area
- Former names: Penn-Can Mall

General information
- Type: Auto row, former shopping mall
- Location: 5885 East Circle Drive, Cicero, New York, United States
- Coordinates: 43°9′0″N 76°6′52″W
- Opened: March 28, 1976; 50 years ago

Technical details
- Floor count: 2
- Floor area: 762,962 sq ft (70,881.5 m^{2}) (as Penn-Can Mall)

Design and construction
- Developer: Winmar

Other information
- Number of stores: 100+
- Number of anchors: 3

Driver's Village is an auto row in Cicero, New York, near Syracuse, New York, United States. It is housed in a former shopping mall which was known as Penn-Can Mall. Opened on March 28, 1976, Penn-Can Mall was the first enclosed mall on the north end of Syracuse, and the fourth mall to be built in the entire metropolitan area. It was constructed by the Winmar Company of Seattle, Washington, and had room for 86 stores. At the mall's inception, only 28 stores were open, but the other spaces quickly followed, followed by even more during an expansion in 1986, putting the mall's store count to 121. Anchor stores of the mall included Hills, Sears, and Chappell's. After a period of decline in the 1990s, brought on by competition from newer malls in the Syracuse area, Penn-Can Mall closed in 1996. The structure was partially demolished and reopened in 2000 as Driver's Village.

== Building design ==
Penn-Can Mall opened in 1976. It was built in a straight line, and later it was in a "T" shape following the expansion. Originally, it was anchored by Sears, with a Hills added at the opposite end in 1983; another wing with Chappell's was added in 1986. Local department stores Addis & Company and Dey Brothers also had junior-anchor locations, and the mall included a three-screen movie theater.

Wilmorite entered a partnership with the Eagan family, the mall's original owners, in 1989. The Wilmorite company built another mall, Great Northern Mall in Clay, in 1988. Both Sears and Chappell's moved to Great Northern, with Steinbach and Caldor replacing their respective stores at Penn-Can. The Pyramid Companies opened its Carousel Center nearby in 1990, further increasing competition against Penn-Can. After Steinbach closed, it was replaced with a Burlington Coat Factory in 1993. Caldor replaced the Chappell's a year later, following the opening of Caldor stores at other Wilmorite properties.

In 1994, Wilmorite announced plans to demolish the main mall structure, leaving the Burlington Coat Factory, Hills, and Caldor stores. Under these plans, the mall itself would be replaced with a power center which would have included an unnamed big box home improvement store and a movie theater operated by Regal Cinemas.

The mall itself closed in 1996, leaving only the Hills store operational until that chain closed in 1999, and was replaced by Ames, which remained open until 2002, and the Burlington, which remained until 2016.

== Conversion to Driver's Village ==
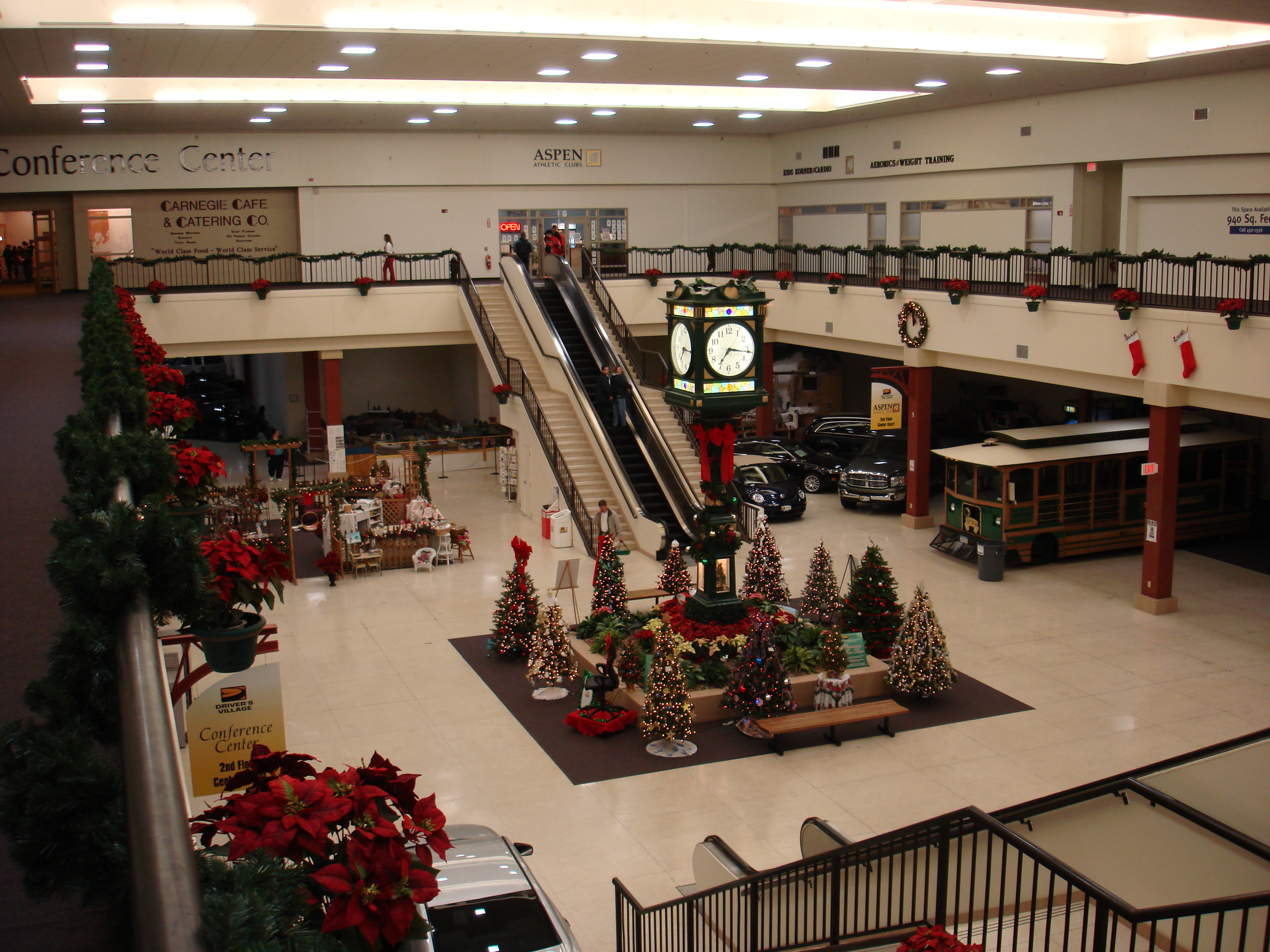
Center Court of Driver's Village in December 2006

In early 2000, local area auto dealer Roger Burdick purchased the old mall and proceeded to turn it into an auto mall, known as Driver's Village. With a design by Robertson Strong Apgar Architects, the old Sears and Ames wings were demolished, and the rest of the mall was gutted, save for the hallway and the eastern portion of the newer wing from 1986. Ames closed in 2002 and was turned into a used car showroom. The rest of the mall has been converted into showrooms and service centers for 16 auto brands.

Retail is still present in Driver's Village which includes a cafe, a catering company, a children's party location, as well as real estate, insurance, financial and tax service offices. Aspen Athletic Club and the Greater Syracuse Sports Hall of Fame are also located there.

=== Manufacturers ===
There are currently 16 new car franchises connected to the main building at Driver's Village. These include Audi, Buick, Chevrolet, Chrysler, Dodge, Fiat, GMC, Jeep, Kia, Lincoln, Mazda, Mitsubishi, Nissan, Porsche, Ram and Volkswagen. Additionally, there are four franchises in separate buildings on the property: BMW, Hyundai, Lexus and Toyota.
