= Park Point =

Point Park may refer to:

- Park Point (Minnesota), a neighborhood and sandbar in Duluth, Minnesota, USA
- Park Point at RIT, a commercial enterprise on Rochester Institute of Technology's campus in Rochester, New York, USA
- Point Park University, a liberal arts university in Pittsburgh, Pennsylvania, USA
