= Robot Galaxy =

- Company type: Private
- Industry: Retail
- Founded: 2007
- Headquarters: New York, New York, U.S.
- Key people: Oliver Mitchell, Ken Pilot
- Products: Build-Your-Own Robots
- Number of employees: ~20
- Website: www.robotgalaxy.com

Robot Galaxy was a mall-based retail and entertainment company that allowed children to build their own personalized robots. The Robot Galaxy brand included retail stores, an online virtual world, and a comic book series.

== History ==
Robot Galaxy was founded in 2007 by entrepreneur Oliver Mitchell and former retail executive Ken Pilot . The first two stores opened October 2007; one in the Palisades Center in West Nyack, NY and the other in the Freehold Raceway Mall in Freehold, NJ. In November 2008, Robot Galaxy opened a store within Toys R Us Times Square .

== Retail ==
The store experience allowed children to customize their own personal robots. Children began by picking a character from the comic book series and then choose from a variety of different motorized parts and accessories to construct a unique robot. Considering the number of robot parts to choose from, there were over a thousand possible robots.

Once activated, the robots have a USB connection that allowed robot owners to plug their robots into their computers, connecting to the Robot Galaxy virtual world.

== Online virtual world ==
The online virtual world provided a safe community for children to play games and battle with other robots. By playing games and collecting points, children can unlock new features on their robots.

== Comic book series ==
There are four comic books. The comic books explain the story of the Robot Galaxy, and include all robots available for sale in stores.
