= Central New York Playhouse =

- Founded: 2012
- Founder: Dustin Czarny
- Location: 3469 Erie Blvd. E. DeWitt, NY 13214
- Website: cnyplayhouse.org

Central New York Playhouse is a community theater company in DeWitt, New York. Founded in 2012, the Playhouse performs a monthly production in ShoppingTown Mall.
