= ShoppingTown Mall =

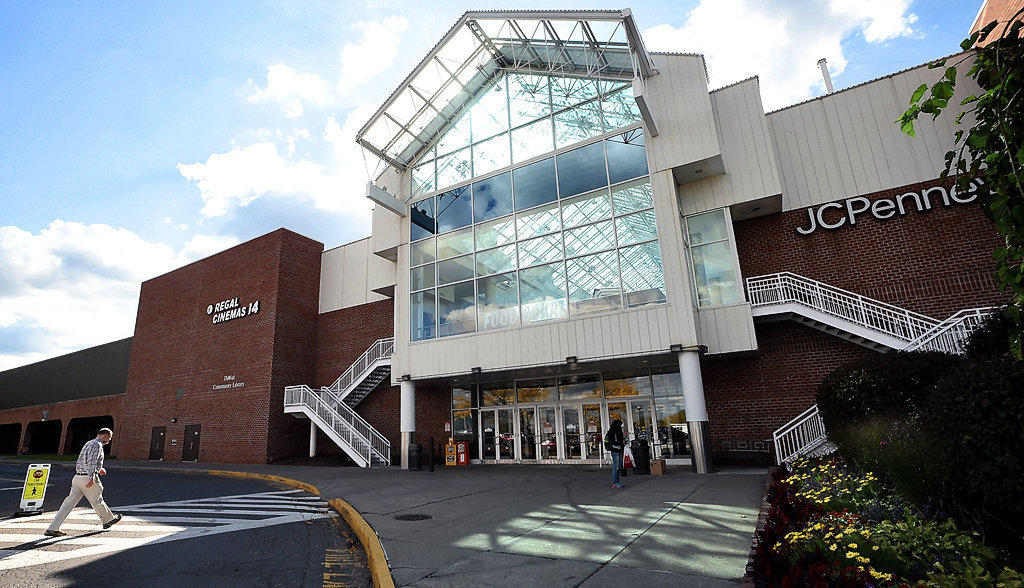
- ShoppingTown main entrance
- Location: 3649 Erie Boulevard East, DeWitt, New York, US
- Coordinates: 43.0406°N 76.06411°W
- Opened: 1954 (as a strip mall, then enclosed in 1973)
- Closed: March 2020
- Developer: Eagan Real Estate Inc.
- Owner: Onondaga County, New York
- Num. of stores: 0
- Num. of anchor tenants: 0
- Floor area: 988,054 sq ft (91,793 m^{2})
- Floors: 2
- Website: www.shoppingtownmall.com

ShoppingTown Mall is an abandoned regional shopping mall in Dewitt, New York. First opened as an open-air shopping center in 1954, it was enclosed in 1973 and remained a major shopping center before no longer being part of Dewitt New York in March 2020 to make way for a new $400 million development, which will be named District East. Much of the existing mall will be demolished for a phased development that includes a substantial residential component, a movie theater complex, retail space and offices, as well as new sidewalks, bike paths, walking trails, and large park and green space that will serve as a spearhead to the Empire State Trail.

== History ==
=== Open-air shopping center ===
Shoppingtown Mall began as an open-air shopping center, first announced in August 1953 and managed by Eagan Real Estate Inc. At this time, tenants including F. W. Woolworth, J. C. Penney, Walgreens, Grand Union, Acme Markets, Fanny Farmer, Endicott Johnson, and Kinney Shoes had already signed on to the project. Local Syracuse department store Addis' signed onto the project in February 1954, and later that month a four-day grand opening gala was announced, set to begin March 3. The center opened as planned on March 3 with most major tenants, with Addis opening later on October 8, 1954. Multiple new stores, including Flah & Co, W. T. Grant, and a Kallet Theater, began construction in 1955–1956.

A Dey's Store For Homes was first announced in 1960, with plans for the home store to open by 1961, with a full store projected to open at a later date. The home store opened August 25, 1962, followed by the full store which opened on October 11, 1966. The center was affected by a fire in April 1967, which most affected Flah & Co, who remained closed for over a month to completely restock and remodel the store. A branch store of Syracuse department store E.W. Edwards & Sons opened in November 1968. A new 2-screen Kallet Theater opened December 28, 1968.

=== Mall conversion ===
Shoppingtown began conversion into an "all-climate mall" in late 1973, with Edwards planned to be one of the anchors, though Edwards closed its doors amidst bankruptcy in November 1973. The mall suffered a fire in June 1974, which fatally injured one firefighter and caused an estimated $500,000 in damages, primarily to W.T. Grant. The two-screen Kallet theater was purchased by Carrols Development Corp in 1974, and operated as a Cinema National. Woolworth also announced the closure of its Shoppingtown store on December 31, 1974. Rumored since shortly after the store's closing in 1973, J. C. Penney opened a new, larger store in the former Edwards in January 1975. Both Flah & Co and Addis' opened new stores at the mall, said to be double the size of their previous locations in the center. The mall opened on August 4, 1975, with a week-long grand opening ceremony.

=== Enclosed mall ===
Woolworth's re-joined the mall in August 1978, taking over the former W.T. Grant space. The mall added a 57,000 sq ft (5,300 m^{2}) Chappell's as an anchor in October 1984. Addis merged with Dey Brothers in May 1989, with plans to close the Addis store at the mall, and merge operations into the existing Dey Brothers store. Shortly after this, Wilmorite Properties gained control of the mall through a partnership with Eagan in Summer 1989, announcing a major remodel later that year.

The remodel was completed at a cost of $53 million in 1991, adding a new wing which included a relocated Addis & Dey store and a food court, with the original Addis & Dey store being split between TJ Maxx in 1991 and Steinbach's in 1992. Addis & Dey announced the closure of their Shoppingtown Mall store amidst bankruptcy in 1992. Shortly thereafter in early 1993, Kaufmann's announced it would relocate from Fayetteville Mall to the former Addis & Dey space. Woolworth's closed for the second and final time in early 1993. Steinbach's closed July 1, 1994, after recording hundreds of thousands in losses at the store, and TJ Maxx relocated to the Fayetteville Mall. Sears took over both floors of the former Addis & Dey space, in addition to building a new auto center. Media Play was announced in April 1994, taking over the former Woolworth's and Kallet Theater spaces for a 48,000 sq ft (4,500 m^{2}) location. The Bon-Ton came to the mall with their acquisition of Chappell's in late 1994.

Old Navy opened in January 2000, and Dick's Sporting Goods was announced in March that year. ShoppingTown Mall was one of several properties sold to Macerich by Wilmorite in late 2004 for $2.3 billion. Kaufmann's became Macy's in September, 2006. In March 2007, Macerich announced plans to create an open-air plaza with new shops facing Erie Boulevard East in the Sears wing, though this never materialized perhaps due to the economic recession.

Eventually, LNR threw in the towel. The struggling shopping facility was sold at an online auction in August 2013. The new owner was Las Vegas-based Moonbeam Capital Investments. In late 2014, they were poised to begin a massive redevelopment. This initiative was thwarted by the shuttering of Macy's in March 2015. To add insult to injury, Dick's Sporting Goods moved out of the mall and down the road in October of the same year. All of the store closings caused Moonbeam Capital to reevaluate their redevelopment plan. A more mixed-use -lifestyle-like- reinvention was envisaged, with office, healthcare and residential components. Plans for a partial demolition of the West Wing, originally proposed in 2007, were revived. The western half of the wing would be razed, with existing stores on the east side opened up to an expanded parking area. J.C. Penney, who had maintained a ShoppingTown Mall store since 1954, threw in the towel and ceased operations on April 8, 2016. Christopher & Banks called it quits in May 2016. TGI Fridays inside ShoppingTown Mall went out of business on September 12, 2016. Ming Wok was the final food court tenant to permanently black out on January 9, 2018. University Sports Shop, Yankee Candle Company, Tuxedo Junction, Dunkin Donuts, and PayLess ShoeSource left the mall in 2017, followed by Sears, which went permanently dark on September 2, 2018, leaving ShoppingTown Mall anchorless. Rite Aid said goodbye and has left ShoppingTown Mall on June 24, 2019.

Moonbeam Capital served notices to all remaining tenants of ShoppingTown Mall in September 2020 to vacate within 30 days. This was the first step towards a new $400 million development, which will be named District East. Much of the existing mall will be demolished for a phased development that includes a residential component, a movie theater complex, a "premium" grocer, specialty retail, and services like doctors and medical offices. The project will also include new sidewalks, bike paths, walking trails, and large park and green space that will serve as a spearhead to the recently enhanced Empire State Trail.
