= Danbury Fair (shopping mall) =

Danbury Fair Mall

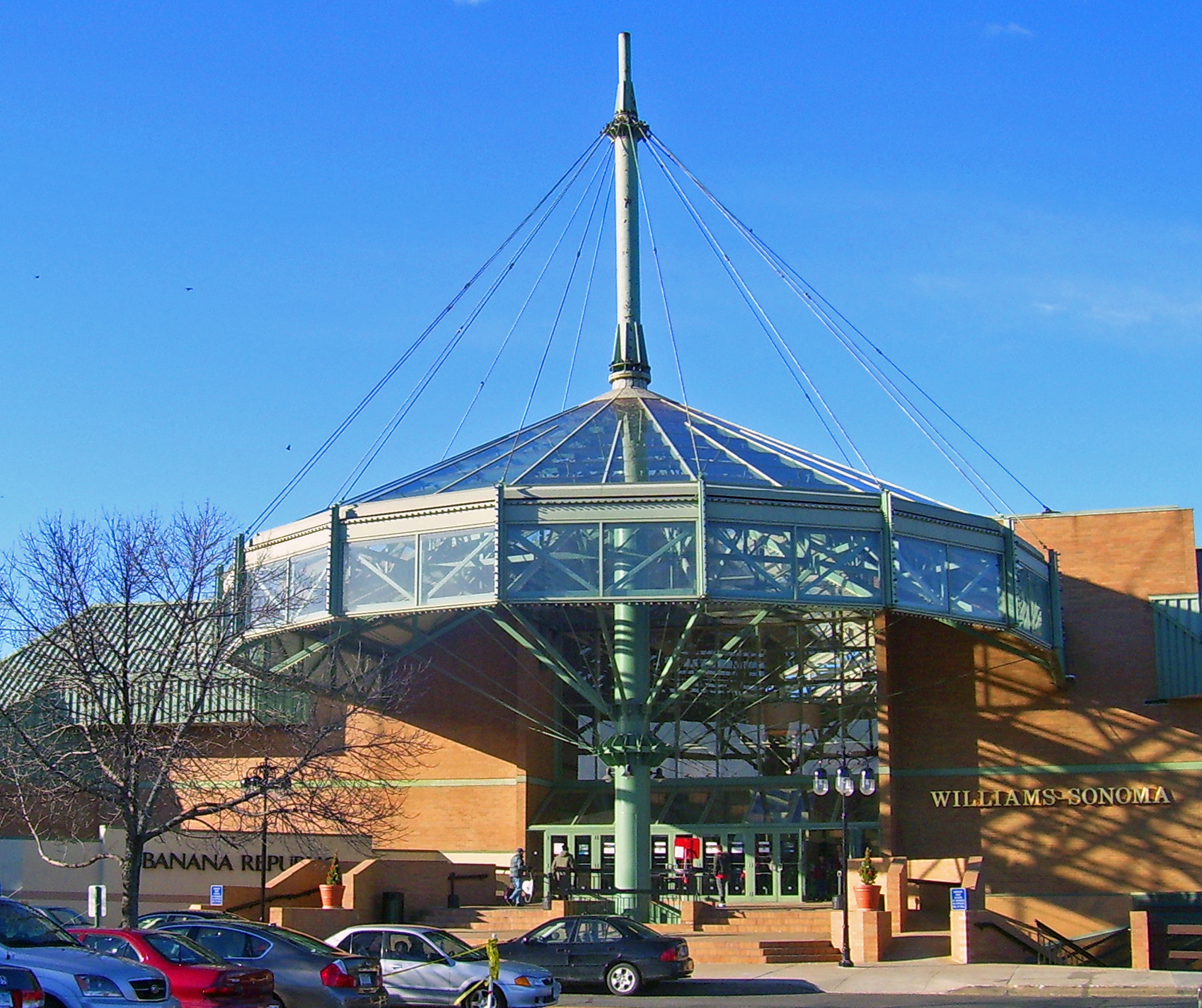
- Entrance, designed to evoke the shape of a carousel
- Location: Danbury, Connecticut
- Coordinates: 41°22′56″N 73°28′39″W
- Address: 7 Backus Avenue, Danbury, CT 06810 United States
- Opened: October 28, 1986; 40 years ago
- Developer: Wilmorite Properties
- Owner: Macerich
- Num. of anchor tenants: 7 (6 open, 1 coming soon)
- Floor area: 1,226,000 sq ft (113,900 m^{2})
- Public transit: HARTransit: 6, 7 Link
- Website: danburyfairmall.com

Danbury Fair (also referred to as Danbury Fair Mall) is an upscale shopping mall located in Danbury, Connecticut. As of 2011, it is the second largest shopping mall in Connecticut, as well as the fifth largest in New England. It is located off of Interstate 84 at Exit 3 and Route 7 opposite the Danbury Municipal Airport.

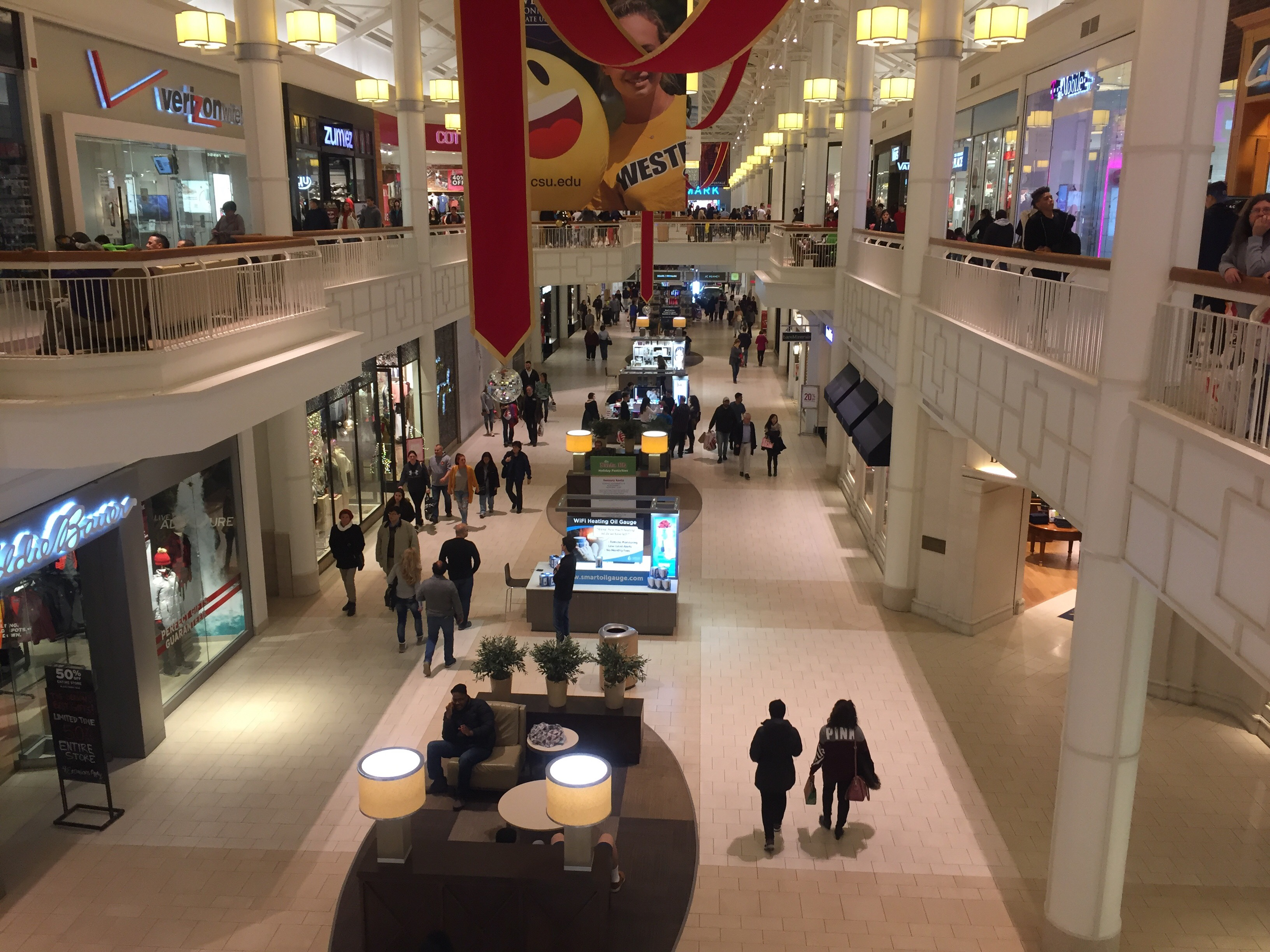
Interior of mall during 2017 holiday shopping season, showing new color scheme and decor

== Overview ==
There are 192 retailers and eateries, including the major department stores Macy's and JCPenney. Filene's was in the mall until the 2006 Macy's consolidation. The mall contains attractions targeting children, including a double-decker carousel in the food court and many youth-oriented events and activities the mall sponsors on a regular basis (such as "Family Fun Night"). Many of these events take place in the mall's center on the lower floor. This space changes throughout the year, and can be converted into a stage area for special events such as song and dance performances. The mall is decorated during the holidays. The carousel is the second largest indoor carousel in the world, second only to the carousel at House on the Rock in Spring Green, Wisconsin.

Every summer from June to July, a carnival opens, taking up one of the mall's parking areas. The mall refers to the event as the “Danbury City Fair” in a nod to the historic fair upon whose site the mall was built. When the mall changed companies in the mid-2000s, however, the carnival was cut back from a month-long event starting in June to just a two-week event, starting every Memorial Day weekend.

== History ==
The mall was built by the Wilmorite Corporation on land formerly used for the Danbury Fair, which paid $170,000 per acre (at that time, the highest price ever paid for land in the Danbury area).

During construction, it emerged that two Wilmorite executives had paid Danbury's then-mayor, James Dyer $60,000 in cash, sometimes concealed in newspapers. They claimed he demanded the money to assure his support for the mall. The allegations contributed to Dyer's defeat for re-election in 1987. He was acquitted of corruption charges in 1990; other charges were dismissed later.

The mall opened in 1986, anchored by Sears and G. Fox & Co. (which became Filene's in 1993). Macy's opened in October 1987, and JCPenney opened in March 1988. In 1991, Lord & Taylor and a parking garage were added. In 2005, the Wilmorite Corporation sold the mall to The Macerich Company.

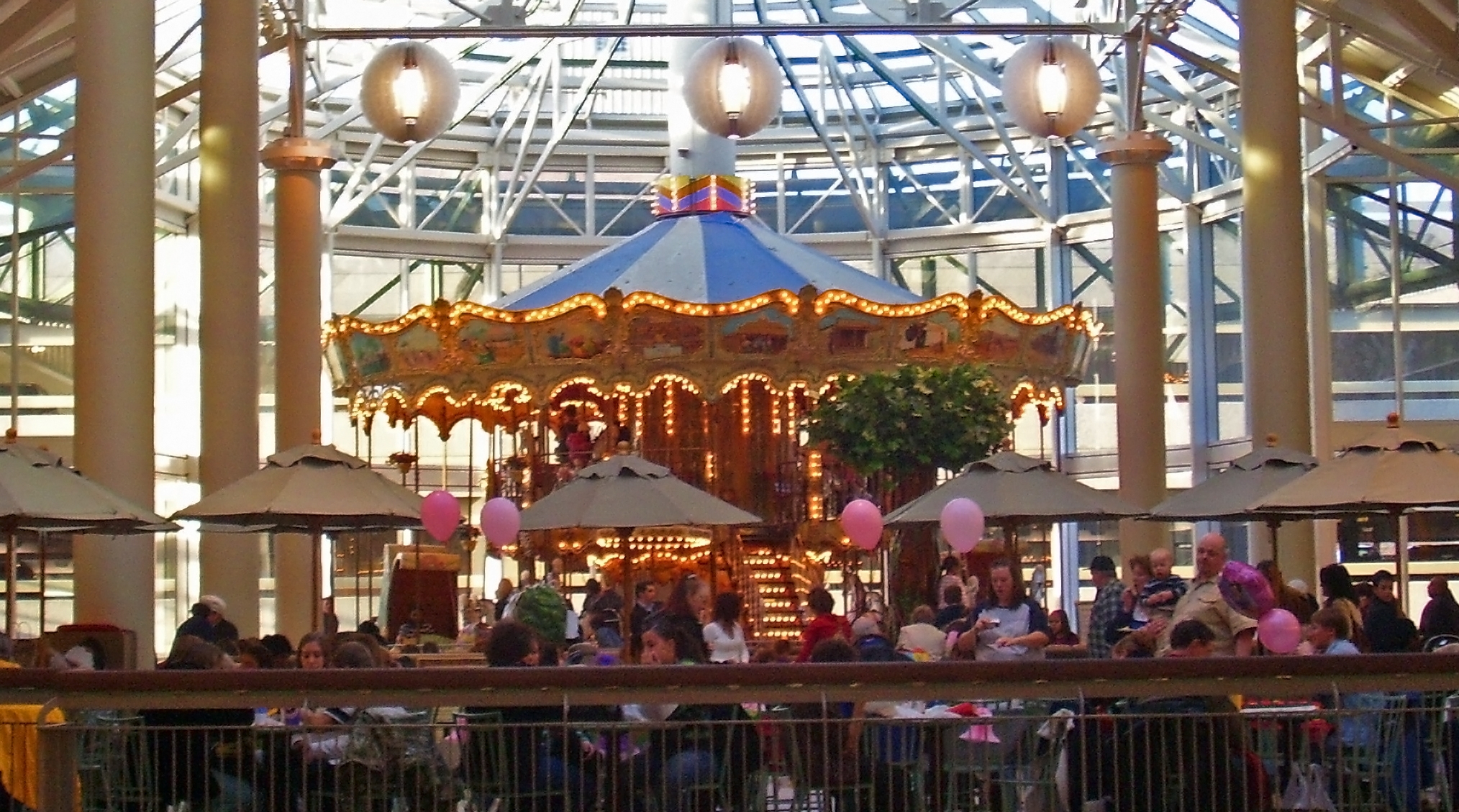
The carousel in the food court, echoing the fairground site the mall was built on.

In January 2007, Danbury Fair began the process of an interior renovation, which was completed in Spring 2008. The two areas that received the most noticeable renovations were the food court and the center court. The renovated food court featured new banquet seating and a slightly curved panoramic view of the restaurants, which reduced the number of restaurants from 16 to 11. In the center court, the large- scale fountains (which also doubled as event areas) were removed and replaced by a Starbucks coffee bar, soft seating with tables, and a down-scaled water feature to reduce the noise level.

By 2010, the Filene's store was reconstructed into mall space which includes Dick's Sporting Goods, Forever 21, Brio Tuscan Grille, The Cheesecake Factory, and L.L.Bean.

In 2015, Primark opened one of its first American locations at the center. It opened in the upper level of the Sears store, while Sears consolidated to an updated 56,000 sq ft format on the lower level.

The dawn of the 2020s saw several traditional retailers reduce the scale of their department store locations due to the impact of both digital retailers and the COVID pandemic.

On November 7, 2019, it was announced that the Sears anchor store would close.

In August 2020, Lord & Taylor announced it would close all its retail stores, as a result of the economic impact of the COVID-19 pandemic.

On March 9, 2024, Round1 opened in the lower level of the former Forever 21. On April 9, 2024, Target opened in the lower level of the former Sears.

== List of anchor stores ==
Name	No. of Floors	Year opened	Year closed	Notes
Macy's	3	1987	—N/a	
JCPenney	2	1988	—N/a	
Lord & Taylor	2	1991	2020	
Primark	1	2015	—N/a	Replaced the second floor of Sears.
Dick's Sporting Goods	1	2010	—N/a	Replaced Filene's. Replaced the second floor of Forever 21 in 2020.
Sears	2	1986	2020	Downsized to first floor in 2015 and closed in 2020.
G. Fox	2	1986	1993	
Filene's	2	1993	2006	Replaced G. Fox.
Forever 21	2	2010	2019	Replaced Filene's.
Target	1	2024	—N/a	Replaced the first floor of Sears.
Round1	1	2024	—N/a	Replaced the first floor of Forever 21.

== See also ==
- Freehold Raceway Mall in Freehold Township, New Jersey - Built by developer Wilmorite a few years after Danbury Fair and also currently owned by Macerich. Due to both malls being built around the same time in the New York metropolitan area, utilizing similar interior design fixtures, along with both malls residing under relatively similar high socioeconomic areas and thus offering similar stores, they are sometimes attributed as retail 'twins'.
- Kyle Gordon - American comedian, actor, musician, singer-songwriter, and Youtuber who in his song "If You Break Up with Me", a song where a boyfriend threatens to kill himself if his ex-girlfriend doesn't get back together with him again, threatens to also blow up the mall.
