= Great Northern Mall (New York) =

Coordinates: 43.188219°N 76.225290°W

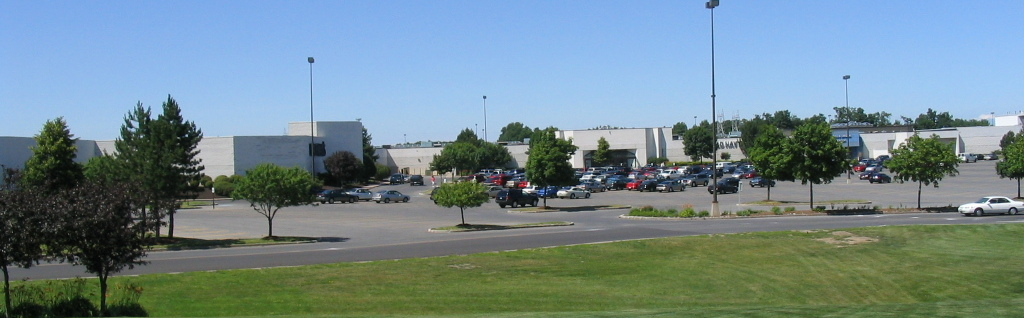
- Great Northern Mall
- Location: Clay, New York, United States
- Opened: October 5, 1988; 38 years ago
- Closed: November 20, 2022; 3 years ago
- Developer: Wilmorite Properties
- Owner: Kohan Retail Investment Group
- Floor area: 895,000 square feet (83,100 m^{2})
- Floors: 1

The Great Northern Mall was an enclosed regional shopping mall located in the Syracuse suburb of Clay, New York. It closed in 2022 for redevelopment by Hart Lyman Company, which plans to transform the mall into a lifestyle center with luxury apartments and townhomes, a movie theater and hotel, high-end shops and restaurants. The mall served Syracuse's northern suburbs and Onondaga County.

== History ==
Great Northern Mall opened in 1988, anchors included Sears, The Bon-Ton, Dey Brothers, Chappell's, Macy's, Sibley's, Kaufmann's, Dick's Sporting Goods, and Hess's.

Macy's closed in 2017.

Sears closed in September 2018.

Dick's Sporting Goods closed on July 10, 2021 and moved to another shopping center less than a mile away.

An IHOP opened in front of the mall on March 16, 2021.

On August 17, 2022, the Hart Lyman Company announced they would transform the mall into a lifestyle center, with luxury apartments and townhomes, a movie theater and hotel, high-end shops and restaurants. The mall closed on November 20, 2022.

The development anticipated to break ground in Fall of 2025. Demolition started in February 2026.
