= Aviation Mall =

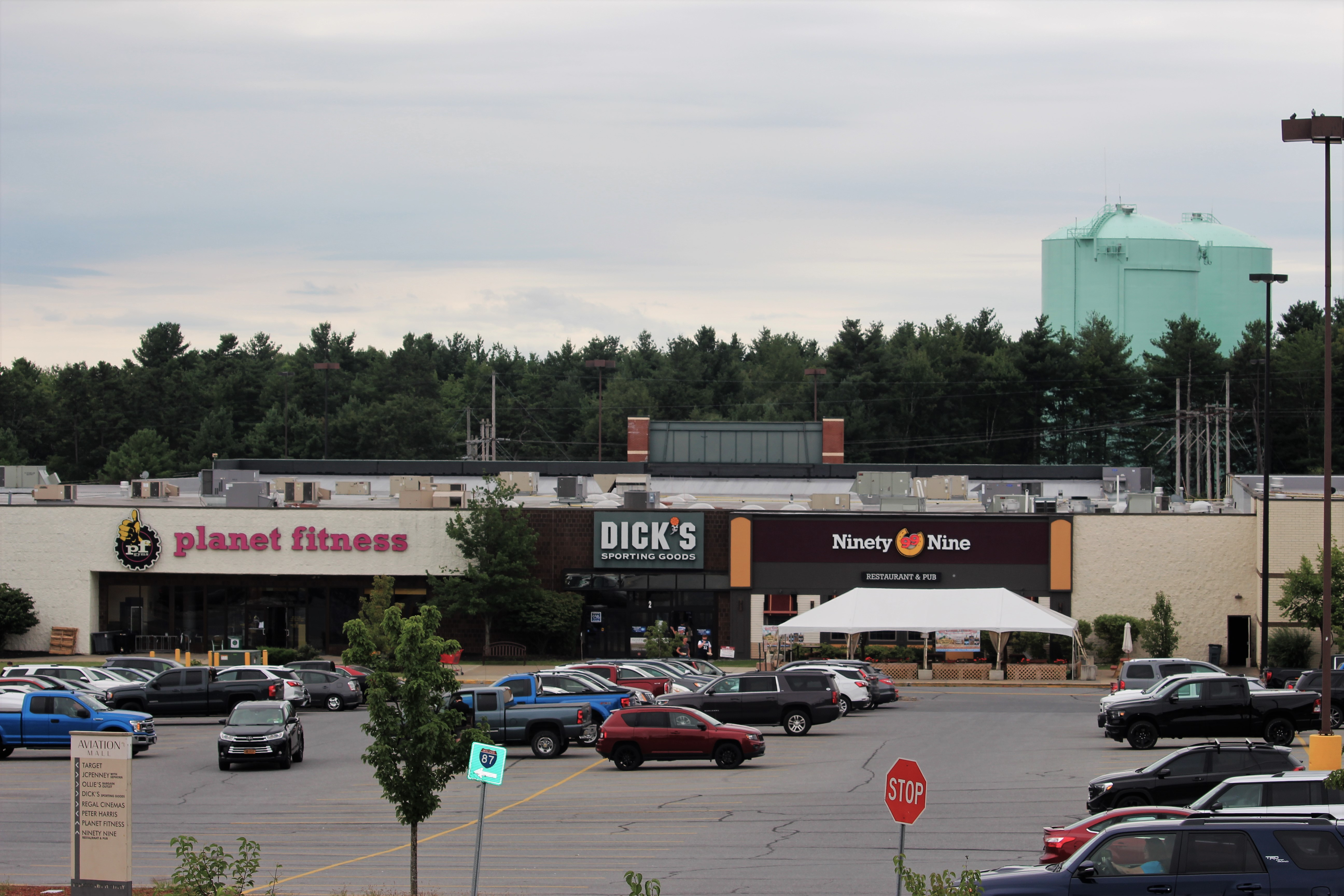
- Location: Glens Falls North, New York, United States
- Coordinates: 43°19′36″N 73°40′39″W
- Opened: 1975
- Developer: The Pyramid Companies
- Manager: Aviation Mall Holdings
- Owner: Aviation Mall Holdings
- Num. of stores: 41
- Num. of anchor tenants: 5
- Floor area: 630,000 square feet (59,000 m^{2})
- Floors: 1
- Website: shopaviationmall.com

Aviation Mall is a major regional shopping mall in Glens Falls North, New York. It serves the extreme northern portion of the Capital District (Albany Metropolitan Area) as well as the Glens Falls/Lake George area. The mall has a gross leasable area of 630,000 square feet (59,000 m^{2}). The mall features JCPenney, Dick's Sporting Goods, Target, Ollie's Bargain Outlet, and ADK Karting, in addition to a nine-screen Regal Cinemas, and a Planet Fitness.

== History ==
Aviation Mall opened in 1975 with JCPenney and Denby's (a regional chain) as anchors. The mall was relatively small when it first opened, but was later expanded with Sears and then Caldor. In 1994, JCPenney built a new store next to its original store, with mall management reconstructing the former space to feature more small store space. TJ Maxx was added the same year replacing space previously occupied by Magrams. In 1998, Caldor shuttered and was converted to The Bon-Ton. Target built on in 2004, and Dick's Sporting Goods moved into remaining space of the original JCPenney in 2005.

In 2017, Regal Cinemas opened after expanding from seven screens to nine and was upgraded to feature new flooring and wall coverings along with reclining seats.

The dawn of the 2020s saw several storied traditional department store retailers update its brick-and-mortar formats after being encroached upon to a degree by several digital retailers in recent years.

On April 17, 2018 it was announced department store retailer The Bon-Ton would be shuttering after it wasn't able to establish any new conditions to satisfy its established long-term debt. On March 4, 2019, it was announced that the previous The Bon-Ton outpost would become an Ollie's Bargain Outlet which was set to open August 28, 2019.

On August 22, 2018, it was announced that Sears would shutter as part of an ongoing decision to phase out of brick-and-mortar. Potential replacement tenants have been rumored in discussion since 2019.

In July 2024, Pyramid Management Group defaulted on its loans. The Woodmont Company was appointed by the court to manage the mall, which was purchased at auction on September 10, 2025 for $21 million by Concord Capital New York.

On November 12, 2025, ADK Karting opened up inside the former Sears building. ADK Karting is a go-karting venue that was constructed throughout 2025. ADK Karting also includes an arcade and glow mini-golf course Attached to the go-kart venue is a bar and grill restaurant that opened along with ADK Karting called Paddock 578.
