= James P. Wilmot =

American racehorse owner (1911–1980)

James P. Wilmot (1911–1980) was a pioneer aviation executive, landowner, philanthropist and horse breeder who served as Finance Chairman of the Democratic National Committee. The James P. Wilmot Cancer Center at the University of Rochester is named in his honor.

Jim Wilmot was raised in Rochester, New York, the son of James Butler Wilmot and Josephine O'Leary. His father owned a small chain of clothing stores. Beginning his career as an employee of Rochester Municipal Airport, he started a pilot-training company called Page Airways. The company would grow to become an international aviation sales corporation that was the exclusive agent for Grumman Corp.'s Gulfstream G2 jets.

Mr. Wilmot served as a Corporate Director of Columbia Pictures and the Irving Trust in addition to co-founding and running Wilmorite Properties with his brother William F. Wilmot (Wee), the family's real estate development enterprise. He was chairman of the Democratic Party's Finance Committee, and a good friend of such figures as House Speaker Thomas P. Tip O'Neill, Senator Henry M. 'Scoop' Jackson and Vice President Hubert Humphrey, who relaxed at Wilmot's estate after the 1968 Presidential Election campaign.

Along with his brother William, Jim Wilmot was a noted horsebreeder. At one time the Wilmots owned the historic racetrack Freehold Raceway in New Jersey. In 1974, one of his and his brother's horses, Gold and Myrrh, sired by Damascus, ran in the 100th Kentucky Derby, and he met special guest the Princess Margaret, sister of Queen Elizabeth II. His nephew William B. Wilmot, son of William F., would later successfully train Gold and Myrrh, peaking with a win over Forego in the Metropolitan Handicap. Today, William B. is a top thoroughbred horse breeder along with his wife Joan Taylor through the family's Stepwise Farm, located in Saratoga Springs, New York.
