= Manalapan EpiCentre =

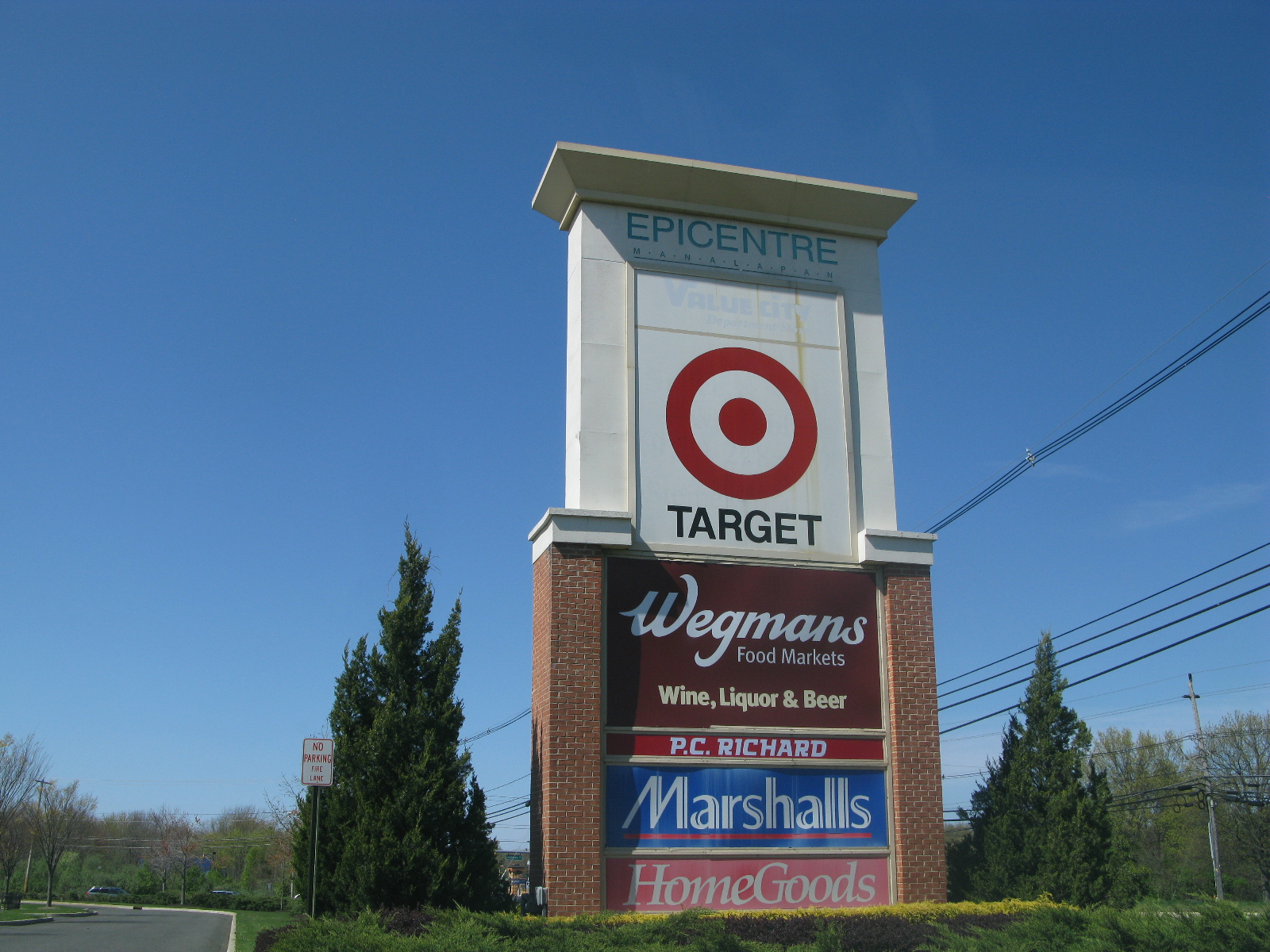
- Signage along U.S. Route 9
- Location: Manalapan, New Jersey, United States
- Coordinates: 40.291°N 74.300°W
- Opened: 2002
- Owner: Steiner Equities Group, LLC
- Num. of anchor tenants: 2
- Floor area: 460,000 square feet (42,735 m^{2})
- Floors: 1
- Parking: Parking lot
- Public transit: NJ Transit bus: 63, 64, 67, 130, 132, 139

The Manalapan EpiCentre opened in 2002 on the corner of U.S. Route 9 southbound and Symmes Drive in Manalapan, New Jersey. The mall serves the Marlboro and Freehold area. It replaced the earlier Manalapan Mall that was demolished in 1998.

== History ==
Manalapan Mall
- Location: Manalapan, New Jersey, United States
- Opened: 1971
- Closed: 1998
- Floors: 1
- Parking: Parking lot

The Manalapan Mall was a shopping mall in Manalapan, New Jersey. It opened in 1971 on the corner of U.S. Route 9 southbound and Symmes Drive and was demolished in 1998 to be replaced by the Manalapan EpiCentre. The mall was anchored by Steinbach, and had 25 stores attached to its south side. A second phase would have included a Macy's, a Sears, and would have grown to a total of 100 stores, but the plans were shelved because of financial problems. By the 1980s, plans were submitted for a super-regional mall, the Freehold Raceway Mall, about 5 miles (8 km) south on Route 9. In 1996, the Steinbach chain was bought out, and the Manalapan Mall store was not included in the purchase. The former Steinbach store was converted to a Value City location. In October 2008, Value City declared bankruptcy and announced they would close all stores by early 2009. The Value City became a P. C. Richard & Son, which opened on November 11, 2011. A Sports Authority opened on August 11, 2012, in the same building as the P. C. Richard & Son, along with a Bonefish Grill on January 27, 2014. Sports Authority only lasted less than four years as they closed in June 2016, two months before the company went out of business as a whole. On February 28, 2019, the space was replaced with HomeSense.

A proposal in the early 1990s to expand the deteriorating mall faced opposition from neighbors fearing increased traffic. By the late 1990s, while Freehold Raceway Mall was prospering, Manalapan Mall was becoming a dead mall. In 1998, the mall, except for the Value City, was torn down to make way for a big-box Epi-Center with a total of 400,000 square feet (40,000 m^{2}) of retail space, some four times the area of the original site.

The HomeSense store site is a stand-alone store while the south and west corners of the old mall were turned into Wegmans, The Wiz (which was closed in 2003 and replaced by HomeGoods), Dick's Sporting Goods (which later moved to a space at the Freehold Raceway Mall and was replaced by Marshalls) and a Target. Other smaller businesses in the Manalapan EpiCentre are Applebee's, Verizon, Pet Valu, Eyechic Optical Boutique, Gary's Jewelers, Hand & Stone, Cucina Alessi Italian Ristorante, and The Turning Point.A Nordstrom was added in 2025, and a Normans Hallmark was also added in 2023.

In 2005, plans were released to build an alternative mall facility that would include 800,000 square feet (70,000 m^{2}) of space, including retailers, a multiplex theater and hotel.
