= Camillus Plaza =

- Location: Camillus, New York
- Coordinates: 43°02′21″N 76°16′16″W
- Address: 5399 W Genesee St, Camillus, NY 13031
- Opened: 1964
- Closed: 2003 (demolished 2003)
- Developer: Wilmorite Properties
- Num. of stores: 0 (over 100 stores at its peak when it was an enclosed shopping center)
- Num. of anchor tenants: 0 (4 when it was an enclosed shopping center)
- Floors: 1

Camillus Plaza (later Camillus Mall) and now known as Camillus Commons, was a shopping mall in Camillus, New York.

Camillus Plaza opened in 1964 as a strip mall on the site of a former Kallet drive-in theater. Early anchors included A&P (later Great American) and P&C supermarkets, E.W. Edwards, Witherill's, and WT Grant department stores, Goldberg's Furniture and Anderson Little. After Edwards and WT Grant left, they were replaced by JCPenney and a Price Chopper supermarket respectively. In 1981 an enclosed "mall" section was opened, with a two-screen movie theatre (originally CinemaNational, then USA Cinemas, Loews, and finally Hoyts), and a new Kmart anchoring the far end. However, much of the original plaza retained its strip mall format. An aptly named "Mall Entrance" took the place of the strip mall's original Anderson-Little store, and Anderson-Little relocated to the enclosed mall. Silo added a store on the back side of the strip mall, facing the new enclosed section, but not connecting to it. Price Chopper closed in 1982, and made way for Hills.

== Camillus Mall ==
In 1984, most of the remaining strip mall was enclosed. As part of this conversion, Witherill's was replaced by Hess's. P&C moved to a newly constructed freestanding store at the corner of the plaza's property, a Carl's Drugs (later Fay's Drugs, Eckerd, and finally Rite Aid) was attached to P&C, and an additional entrance was added to JCPenney so that mall patrons could enter the store without leaving the enclosed mall. Additionally, the entire complex was renamed Camillus Mall. In 1987, Sears moved from their previous location in Fairmount Fair, adding an 84,800-square-foot (7,880 m^{2}) store to the mall. Silo expanded around the same time, adding an entrance accessible from within the mall. An additional four movie screens were added, however they were not in the same location as the original two, so patrons needed to determine whether their film was showing in "one and two" or "three through six". Eventually, the original two screens were closed, and Hoyts Cinemas expanded "three through six" into the adjacent vacant Silo space, creating a single ten screen facility. In its prime, the enclosed mall featured five anchors.

== Decline ==
Camillus Mall's decline began in 1990, just as the newer and larger Carousel Center (now Destiny USA) opened only seven miles away, concurrent with the beginning of a shift in the area's demographics. Also, Camillus Mall was not convenient to most major highways. In 1994 Hess's closed and became Chappell's (later Bon-Ton, closed on August 29, 2018). In the years to follow, a number of anchor stores and smaller shops began to close, including Silo, Kmart, and Hills. By 2001, Sears and JCPenney had closed as well, leaving only a few small stores and the "Hoyts Cinema 18" left in operation.

== Camillus Commons ==
In 2003, the entire mall was torn down, except for Bon-Ton, the freestanding Applebee's (now split between Adelita's Cocina and Starbucks), the P&C Supermarket (now Tops), the attached Eckerd (now Rite Aid), and the vacant former Kmart building, which was sold to the West Genesee School District for extra classroom space while the adjacent school was renovated, and ultimately became the school's bus garage and transportation office. A new plaza, called ''Camillus Commons'', was constructed on the site of the old mall, construction began in late 2004. Lowe's opened in January 2006. Walmart's Fairmount Fair location was a former Caldor store and could not be expanded (since replaced by Target), so in June 2006 they moved to a newly constructed Supercenter next to Lowe's. A Bank of America branch also opened in the plaza as well as a Verizon Wireless outlet (which relocated to a new Verizon store in Camillus in the late-2010s). Wendy's opened a restaurant behind Denny's in late 2014.

After Bon-Ton closed in the summer of 2018, the building became composed of medical offices such as St. Joseph’s Health, which opened in 2019, and Empire Dermatology, which opened in 2022.
