= Salmon Run Mall =

Shopping mall in Watertown, New York

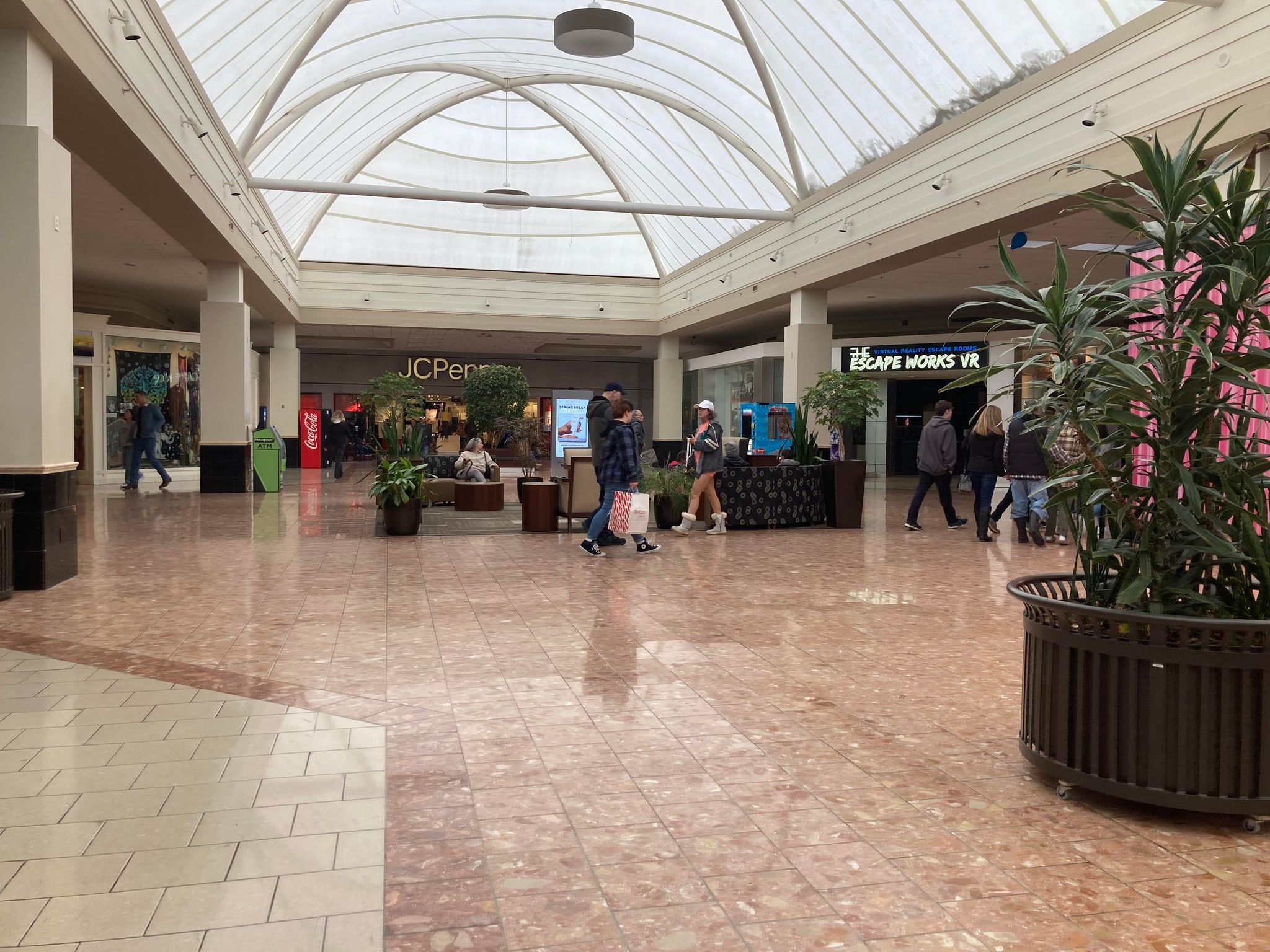
- Salmon Run Mall interior in 2022
- Location: Watertown, New York, United States
- Coordinates: 43.97845°N 75.95315°W
- Opened: 1986
- Developer: The Pyramid Companies
- Manager: The Pyramid Companies
- Num. of stores: 69
- Num. of anchor tenants: 3
- Floor area: 678,118 sq ft (62,999 m^{2})
- Floors: 1
- Website: www.shopsalmonrunmall.com

Salmon Run Mall is an enclosed shopping mall in Watertown, New York. It is anchored by JCPenney, Hobby Lobby, and Regal Cinemas.

== History ==
One of the original anchor stores was a branch for regional Chappell's, which closed in 1993 when the chain entered bankruptcy. It was remodeled that same year and became The Bon-Ton.

Another anchor store that built on in the mid-1990's was Montgomery Ward, which closed and became Burlington in 2001.

On April 17, 2018 it was announced that The Bon-Ton would close, when the parent company went out of business.

In 2019, Sears closed. It was replaced in 2020 by Hobby Lobby.

On June 29, 2023, it was announced that Christmas Tree Shops would close, when the parent company went out of business.

On April 4, 2024, it was announced that Dick's Sporting Goods would relocate to Towne Center Plaza on April 17. On April 11, 2024, it was announced that Burlington would be relocated to the former TJ Maxx at the Price Chopper Plaza. Shortly after Dick’s Sporting Goods opened, Scott Warner’s Binzz & More opened utilizing the former Dick’s Sporting Goods anchor store.

In 2025, Ashley Store announced they would be opening a store in the former Gander Outdoors space next to Planet Fitness. The store opened in 2025.

In late 2025, Crosshairs Airsoft, an air soft shooting range opened in the former The Bon-Ton anchor space.
