= Champlain Centre =

Coordinates: 44°42′8.6″N 73°29′27.5″W

Champlain Centre North
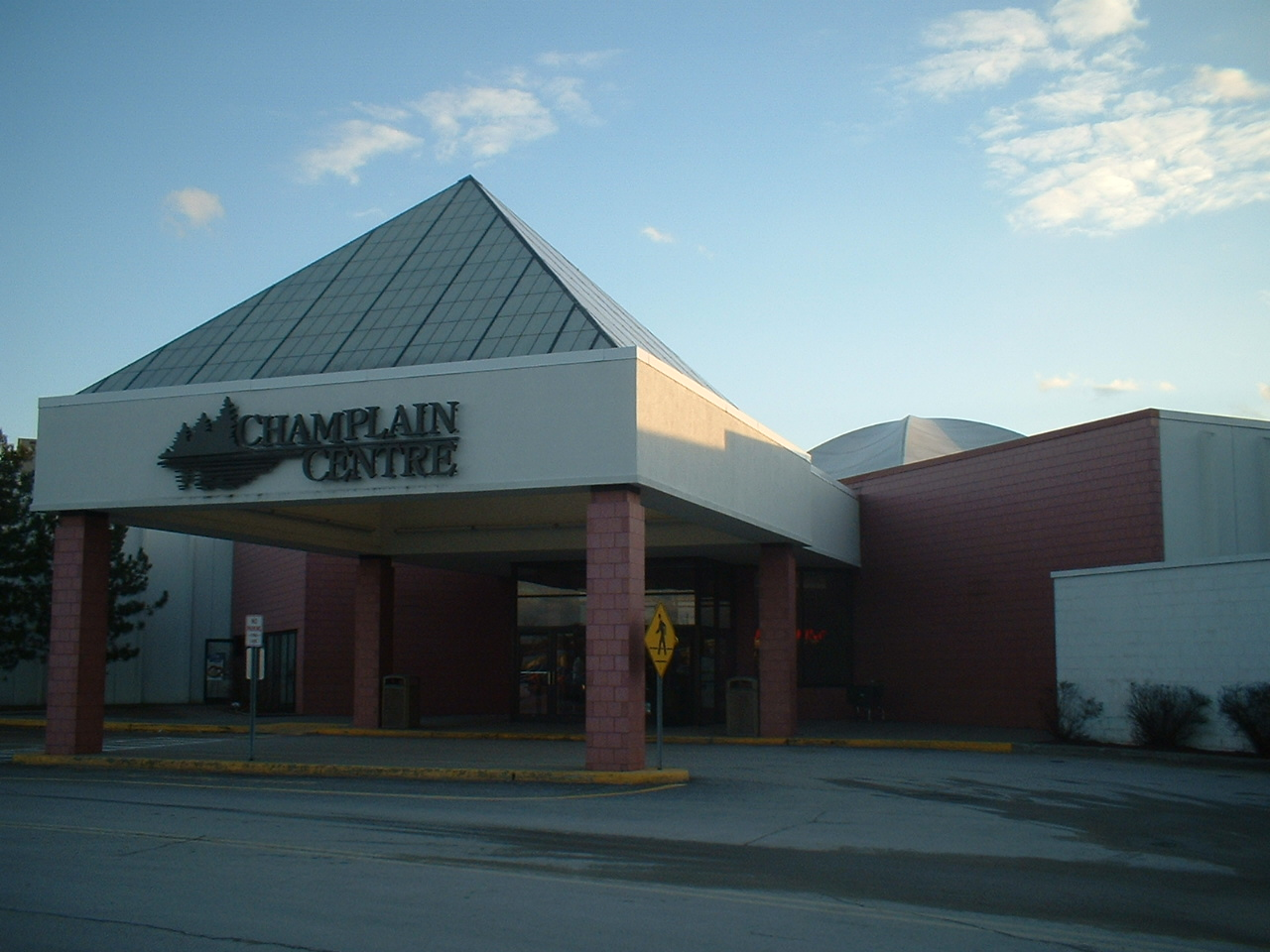
- Entrance to Champlain Centre North, 2007
- Location: Plattsburgh, New York, U.S.
- Address: 60 Smithfield Boulevard
- Opened: July 1, 1987
- Developer: The Pyramid Companies
- Manager: Pacific Retail Capital Partners
- Owner: Deutsche Bank National Trust Company
- Num. of stores: 53
- Num. of anchor tenants: (7)
- Floor area: 610,500 square feet (56,720 m^{2})
- Floors: 1
- Website: Official Website

Champlain Centre North is a shopping mall in Plattsburgh, New York. Opened in 1987, the mall features tenants open & closed, like JCPenney, Target, Dick's Sporting Goods, DSW, Hobby Lobby, Kohl's, Ollie's Bargain Outlet, Ross Stores, Old Navy, Five Below, and a Regal Entertainment Group-owned movie theater.

== History ==
Before the mall opened, The Pyramid Companies had operated another mall in Plattsburgh known as Pyramid Mall, anchored by JCPenney, Montgomery Ward, Price Chopper, and Kmart. As this center was landlocked and incapable of expansion, Pyramid chose to build another mall to its north. The new mall was named Champlain Centre North, and the old one was named Champlain Centre South. JCPenney moved to the newer mall, while Champlain Centre South was briefly redeveloped as an outlet mall before being demolished in the late 1990s.

Champlain Centre opened July 1, 1987. In addition to the new JCPenney store, it was anchored by Sears, Hills, Steinbach, Hoyts Cinemas, and Service Merchandise, which opened that November. A Toys "R" Us opened at the mall in 1997, and Old Navy joined in 1998. Steinbach and Service Merchandise both closed in 1999, and Toys "R" Us closed in 2002. Dick's Sporting Goods replaced the old Steinbach in 2003, Gander Mountain replaced Service Merchandise in 2004, and Borders Books & Music replaced Toys "R" Us in 2005, while the Hills store was converted to Ames following that chain's acquisition of Hills. Ames closed in 2002 with the chain's bankruptcy, and the space became Target in 2008.

Rex Appliances closed in 2005 and Best Buy joined the mall in 2006 in the former space of Rex, Borders closed in 2011, Wendell's Furniture replaced Borders in 2012, and DSW, Inc. opened in 2014. Hoyts Cinemas closed in 2010 for renovations, including the addition of stadium seating, and became Regal Cinemas in 2012. It reopened in late 2012. In April 2016, Sears closed their doors. Hobby Lobby opened in part of the vacated Sears building a year later. Gander Mountain closed in 2017 when the company went bankrupt. It reopened in August 2018 under the new name, Gander Outdoors. Gander Outdoors closed in October 2019. The former Gander Outdoors was turned into an Ollie's Bargain Outlet which opened in November 2020. Kohl's opened in the mall in late September 2019. Best Buy closed its doors in October 2021. In October 2023, Ross Dress For Less opened in the former Best Buy. Also, in October 2023, Pyramid Malls defaulted on the loan and Champlain Centre was foreclosed on. On March 26, 2024, a public auction was held for the property and Deutsche Bank National Trust Company is the owner of the mall. Deutsche Bank National Trust Company is also the bank that held the loan for the mall. On May 7, 2024, Pacific Retail Capital Partners now manages the mall.
