= Park Point at RIT =

- Location: Henrietta, New York, United States
- Coordinates: 43.091519°N 77.658319°W
- Opened: September 27, 2008
- Manager: American Campus Communities
- Owner: American Campus Communities (leased by RIT)
- Num. of stores: 10
- Website: www.americancampus.com/student-apartments/ny/rochester/park-point

Park Point at RIT (originally referred to as "Collegetown" or "College Park") is an apartment complex and commercial enterprise on the northeast corner of Rochester Institute of Technology's campus in Rochester, New York. The property was initially being leased to Wilmorite Properties, until it was bought by American Campus Communities in 2013.

== History ==
For several years, RIT had been looking for ways to add new housing to campus for students. As early as October 2003, rumors spread through RIT's student body about expanding an existing complex, or perhaps a new student housing project. In the winter of 2005, RIT announced a plan for 'College Town'. College Town was envisioned as "a commercial venture that would bring a variety of shopping, dining and housing to a 90-acre (360,000 m^{2}) parcel on the northeast corner of campus." Initially, the area was designed for use primarily by RIT students and faculty, but as time progressed, the idea of College Town expanded to include not only RIT and other college students, but to also incorporate recent graduates, students from other nearby colleges (such as Monroe Community College and the University of Rochester), and the local community.

=== Construction ===
Construction as of November 2007

Although RIT originated the idea for the project, the implementation and operation of Park Point was carried out by Wilmorite Properties.

Construction of Park Point was originally planned to start in the fall of 2006. However, the project was delayed by concerns about the wetlands in the proposed area. RIT worked with the New York State Department of Environmental Conservation and the United States Army Corps of Engineers to overcome the concerns. RIT created an equal amount of wetlands in the southeast corner of campus to offset the loss of wetlands due to the construction of Park Point. Construction began on Monday, April 30, 2007, with the clearing of trees and brush in the area, with the official groundbreaking taking place on June 22. The project also caused minor disturbances to local traffic for brief periods of time. These were mostly attributed to bringing utilities to the area as well as the paving of new entrances on John Street and Perkins Road.

Although tenants were allowed to move in and shops began opening on August 15, 2008, the grand opening of Park Point at RIT was held on September 27, 2008, with a concert called Simone Square Bash 2008.

== Property ==
Park Point is situated upon a 60-acre (240,000 m^{2}) plot of RIT's campus. The land, owned by the RIT, was originally intended to be sold to Wilmorite, but RIT instead chose to lease the land to Wilmorite.

The area contains 32 buildings, 31 of which contain apartments. The buildings are divided into three groupings; the block of buildings along Jefferson Road, the block of buildings along John Street, and the buildings around Simone Square at the intersection of the two streets. Simone Square is a small mall, the southwest end of which has a fountain and an open-air stage. All buildings around the square have apartments from the 2nd to the 4th floors, excluding Barnes & Noble.

Slightly west of Park Point is a former Radisson Hotel at 175 Jefferson Road, which is now student housing directly owned and operated by RIT.

=== Barnes & Noble bookstore ===
When it opened in July, 2007, the Barnes & Noble Academic Superstore anchored the commercial portion of Park Point and also doubled as RIT's campus bookstore, replacing Campus Connections. The computer and photography departments of the old Campus Connections store remained open in a portion of the old location in Monroe Hall on campus and were renamed the Digital Den. The new store was two stories tall, totaling half of Park Point's 80,000 square feet (7,400 m^{2}) of commercial floorspace. "Barnes & Noble @RIT" in Park Point became the official bookstore of RIT and was also open and accessible to the general public. The Barnes & Noble at Park Point also sold RIT merchandise: RIT t-shirts, jerseys, hoodies and numerous other branded items, dormitory supplies, and minor conveniences. There was also a cafe serving Starbucks products inside the store.

Several years before its eventual demise, RIT remodeled and repurposed 3/4 of the store's 2nd floor as office space to house the entirety of the RIT Controller Department.

After many years of struggling to make a profit, Barnes & Noble @RIT in Park Point went out of business and permanently closed its doors in June, 2022. Following the store closure, the RIT merchandise portion of the bookstore was moved back to the previous location in Monroe Hall and the Digital Den store was kept as part of the new store under the name "RIT Campus Store." Specialized art supplies were discontinued, and books were moved to a digital platform called "TextbookX," by Akadémos. There are no longer any physical books sold on RIT campus.

=== Simone Square ===
The focal point of the property is Simone Square, named in honor of Dr. Albert J. Simone. Dr. Simone was RIT's eighth president, and was involved with the project during his presidency. While discussing the College Town project, Simone had said, "We're doing this to increase a sense of community on RIT's campus. That way, students can have a place to release their energies after a hard day on campus and still be together with their classmates and see faculty and staff in a social setting."

The official Grand Opening of Park Point was held on September 27, 2008, in Simone Square.

On April 25, 2009, 10fest, a free concert promoting the release of Glacéau Vitamin Water 10 was held in Simone Square. The concert featured a performance by Christina Milian at sunset.

=== Dining, shopping, and facilities ===
The following shops, restaurants, and facilities occupy Park Point:

- Lovin' Cup, a full service restaurant, wine bar and music venue hosting such events as Def Poetry Jam, Trivia Night and Open Mic Night, Salsa Dance Night and Lovin' Cup Idol competition
- Mecate Mexican Restaurant opened in 2022, occupying the space formerly occupied by Texas BBQ Joint and before that, Alladin's Natural Eatery
- Royal of India
- Veracity VRcade
- A fitness center, free for tenants

=== Housing ===
Apartments are leased fully furnished, and are available in 15 different layouts, including: singles, doubles, triples, quadruples, and quintuples.

== Relations with RIT ==
Although RIT created the concept of an RIT CollegeTown, Wilmorite properties was responsible for construction and the operation of Park point; in 2013 Wilmorite Sold the lease to American Campus Communities The housing at Park Point is not associated with RIT's own Housing Operations, but is instead conducted by American Campus Communities. Additionally, although RIT has its own Public Safety department, Security for Park Point is provided by Allied Universal.

There has been criticism from students residing at Park Point over RIT's refusal to issue commuter parking passes to students living at Park Point. RIT students who rent an apartment at Park Point are considered to be 'On-Campus' for purposes of acquiring a parking pass, and are therefore ineligible to receive parking passes for the various academic parking lots around campus. A student rally was held in Simone Square in which students peacefully planned a course of action: formal petitioning via RIT's Student Government. RIT acknowledged that parking has become a problem, citing a deficit of nearly 1,100 parking spaces during the fall of 2008. In the meantime, additional shuttle bus service to Park Point was provided, with future emphasis placed on creating, among other parking improvements, additional parking spaces and more bike paths on campus.

Buses from the Rochester Genesee Regional Transportation Authority make stops at Park Point as both campus shuttles and city routes.

== See also ==
- College town
