= Freehold Raceway Mall =

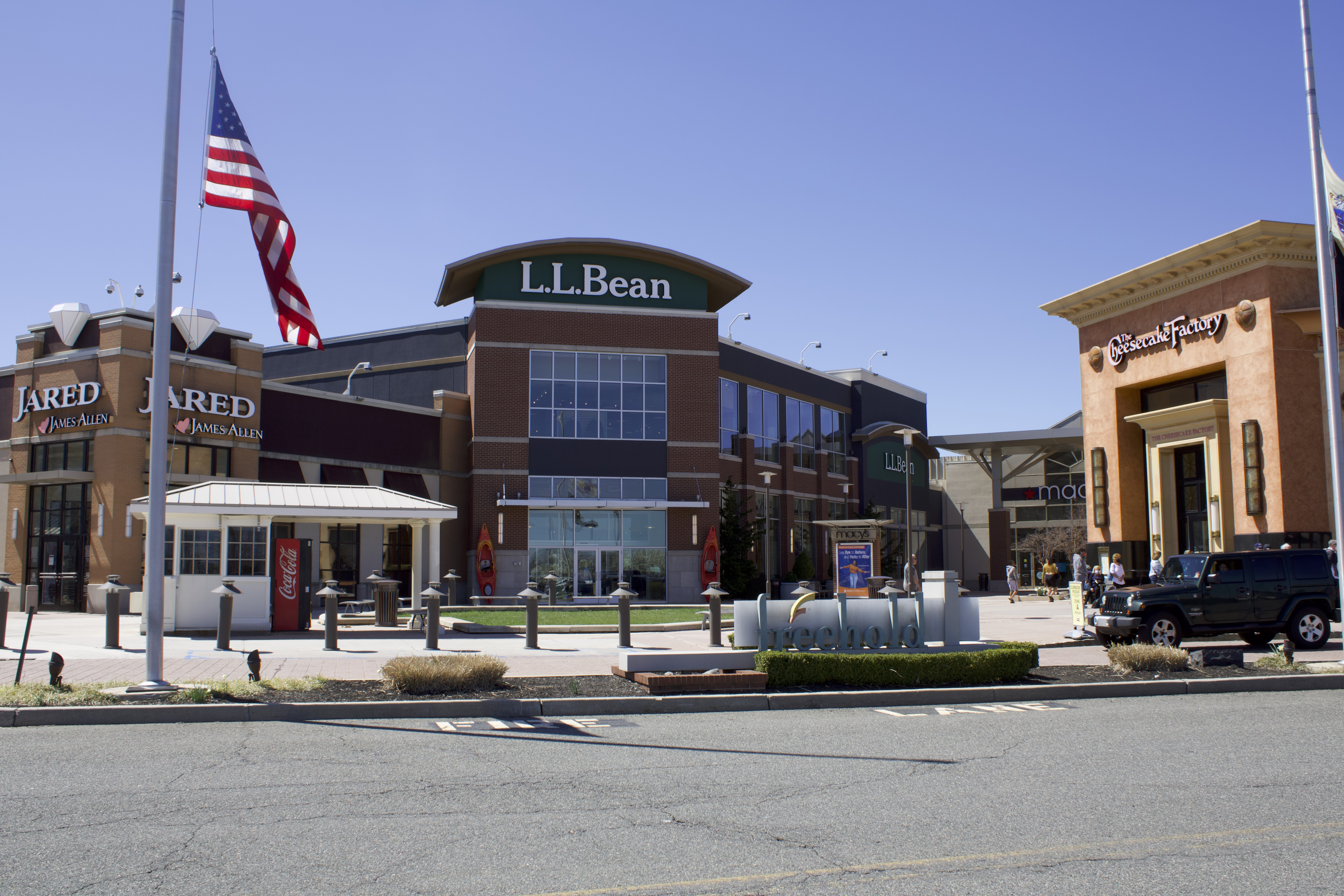
- Entrance at the outdoor lifestyle center
- Location: Freehold, New Jersey
- Coordinates: 40.2521°N 74.2946°W
- Opened: August 1, 1990; 36 years ago
- Developer: Wilmorite
- Manager: Macerich
- Owner: Macerich and Heitman
- Num. of stores: 237
- Num. of anchor tenants: 7 (1 under construction)
- Floor area: 1,553,000 square feet (144,300 m^{2})
- Floors: 2 (3 in Macy's and Von Maur)
- Parking: Parking lot
- Public transit: NJ Transit bus: 67, 836, 838
- Website: freeholdracewaymall.com

Freehold Raceway Mall is a super-regional shopping mall located in Freehold Township, in the U.S. state of New Jersey. As of 2020, it was the largest shopping mall in the Jersey Shore region and the state's third largest shopping mall, behind Garden State Plaza in Paramus, and American Dream in East Rutherford. It is located off of U.S. Route 9, Business Route 33, and West Main Street, opposite the former Freehold Raceway.

The mall is anchored by Macy's, JCPenney, L.L.Bean, Primark, Dave & Buster's, Dick's House of Sport, and Freehold Athletic Club. There is currently a Von Maur anchor store under construction and set to open in fall 2027.

== Overview ==
Freehold Raceway Mall logo

The mall is owned and managed by The Macerich Company, having purchased the mall from developer Wilmorite in 2005, and has a 1,671,000 sq ft (155,200 m^{2}) of total gross leasable area, making it the third largest shopping mall in New Jersey. An outdoor lifestyle addition, begun in January 2007, added 100,000 square feet (9,300 m^{2}) of additional retail space.

On November 23, 2011, the mall was ranked in a Weather Channel news article titled "The Most Congested Malls for Black Friday". Freehold Raceway Mall ranked third in the nation.

== History ==
Construction on Freehold Raceway Mall commenced in 1987, across the street from the Freehold Raceway on land used for stables. The stables still exist, connected by a small pedestrian/horsecart bridge over Route 9, but they can only be accessed via mall entrance road. In preparation for the mall's opening, the Freehold Circle was eliminated and rebuilt into an at-grade intersection with traffic lights and jughandles. A traffic light and jughandle for the mall entrance road from Route 9 was also constructed due south of the intersection of Route 9 and Business Route 33.

=== 1990–2007 ===
The mall officially opened on August 1, 1990; the public opening was preceded by a private "preview" gala and fundraiser for CentraState Medical Center which included papier-mâché racehorse centerpieces and a fabric replica of the food court's carousel, which had not yet arrived from Italy. The mall originally had two anchors: Sears and Lord & Taylor, with construction already underway on JCPenney which later opened in 1991 as well as Nordstrom which inaugurated in 1992. A violent riot in the Fall of 1997 did little to reduce the mall's popularity and a fifth anchor, Macy's, was opened on October 7, 1998. The mall was not initially successful. Vacancies were imminent, and many of the spaces were filled with non-traditional mall tenants, such as municipal services. Local photography clubs displayed their photos on the mall's empty walls, while other areas sported photos of the raceway and the fire that occurred in 1984.

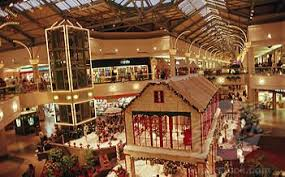
Retro photos of how the Freehold Raceway Mall appeared during the 1990s and early-mid 2000s.

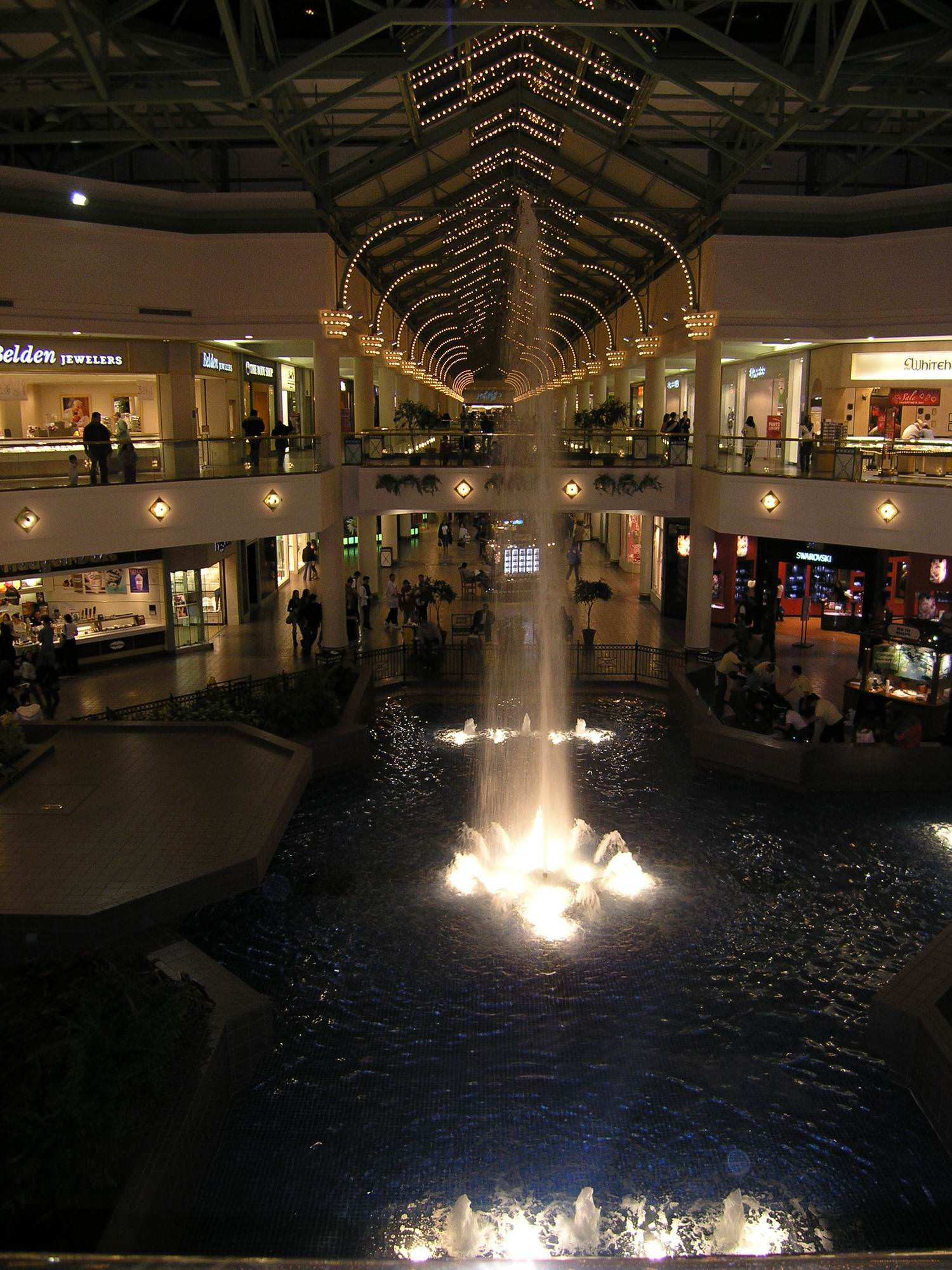

The only evidence of the mall from Route 9 was the monument sign approaching the mall entrance, as the satellite big box stores were not yet built. Customers could also easily travel to the nearby Monmouth Mall, Seaview Square Mall, Brunswick Square Mall, or the Manalapan Mall. When Nordstrom opened the Freehold Raceway Mall had the only location in a 30 miles (48 km) radius. The crowds eventually came and the vacancy rate at the mall significantly dropped. The success of the Freehold Raceway Mall in the 1990s and early 2000s ultimately led to the downfall of the nearby Manalapan Mall, which closed in 1999 (which redeveloped into the Manalapan EpiCentre), along with the Seaview Square Mall (which redeveloped into a power center.).

=== 2007–2020 ===
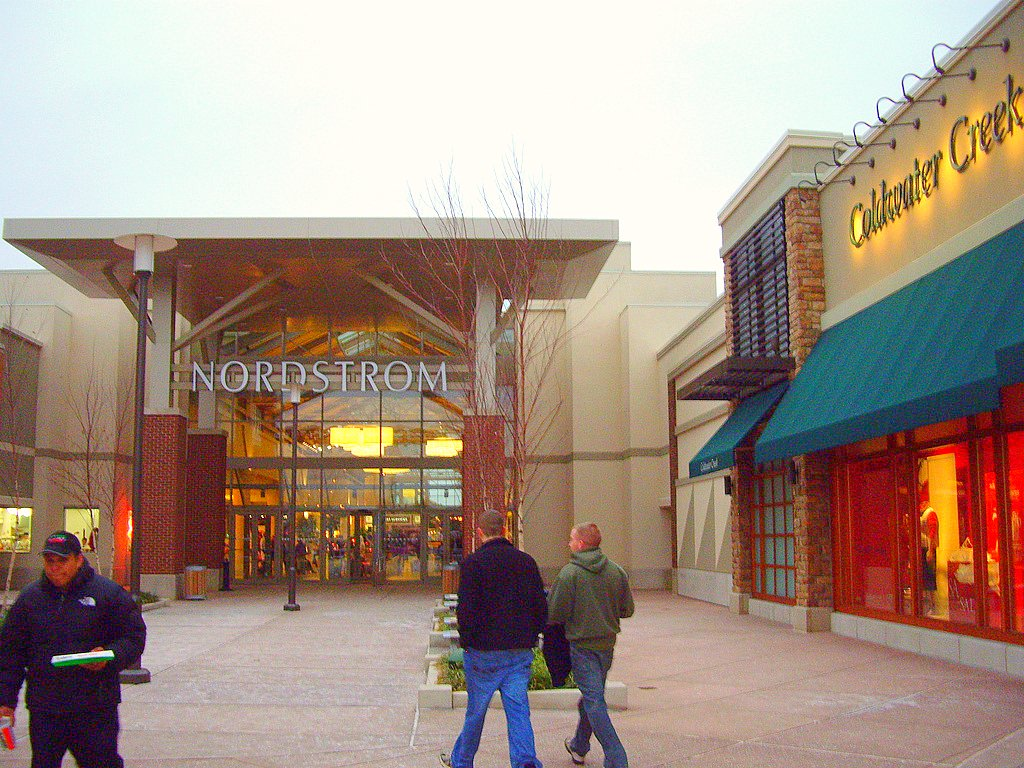
Freehold Raceway Mall entrance featuring original tenant Nordstrom seen from the 2007 lifestyle center addition

Freehold Raceway Mall was expanded in 2007, and construction began in January. The expansion was built in the space between JCPenney and Sears in the upper floor parking lot. The addition included a strip of outdoor stores along the JCPenney side of the mall, occupied by 13 to 15 stores, two restaurants, a promenade, an area for community events and a valet parking station. In April 2007, the mall's first renovation project was underway. The renovation replaced the flooring, changing the brown and green tile to a beige stone tile, it replaced the green paint on the ceilings and ironwork with a more beige/earthtone, the brass rails were replaced in favor of wooden rails, new lighting under the skylights and along/under the columns was added, the globe lighting along the skylights, pillars and ironwork was replaced, a new escalator next to Sears was added, soft, carpeted seating areas were added and the large center court fountain was replaced with a smaller fountain, and a soft seating area. New additions include single- and two-story retail spaces, and two new parking lots which were built on site to replace those that were lost. They are located along the Raceway Mall Drive entrance and on the opposite side of the ring road next to Nordstrom.

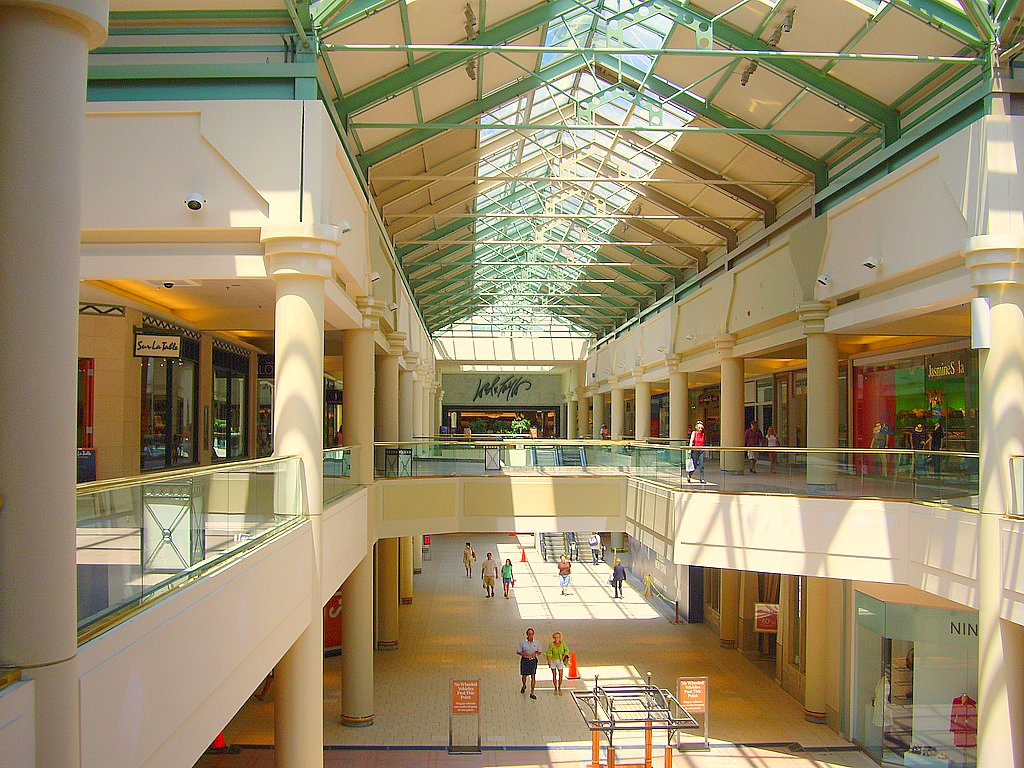
The Freehold Raceway Mall under renovation in Summer 2007.

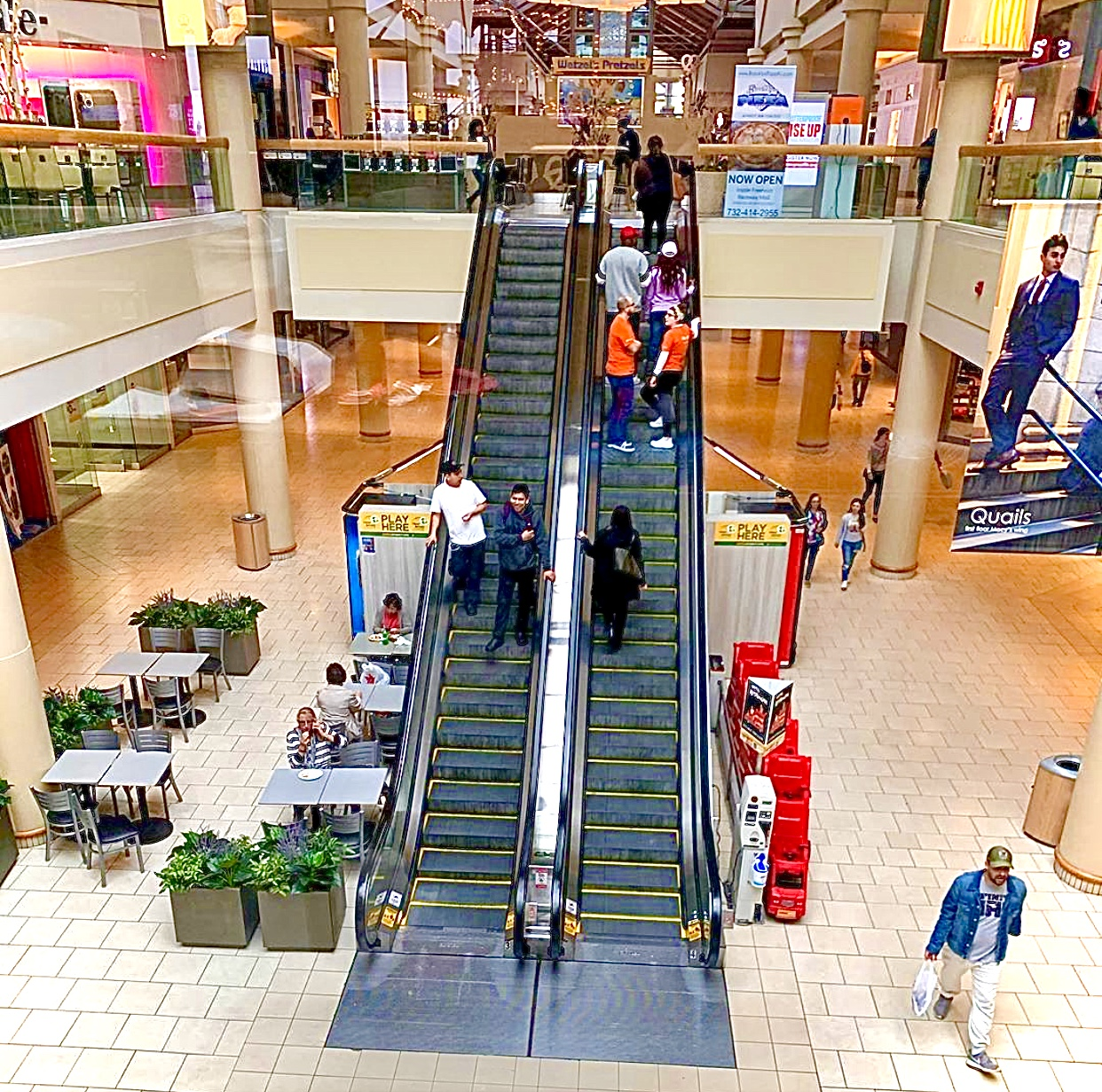
Foot traffic at Freehold Raceway Mall on a weekday afternoon, October 2019

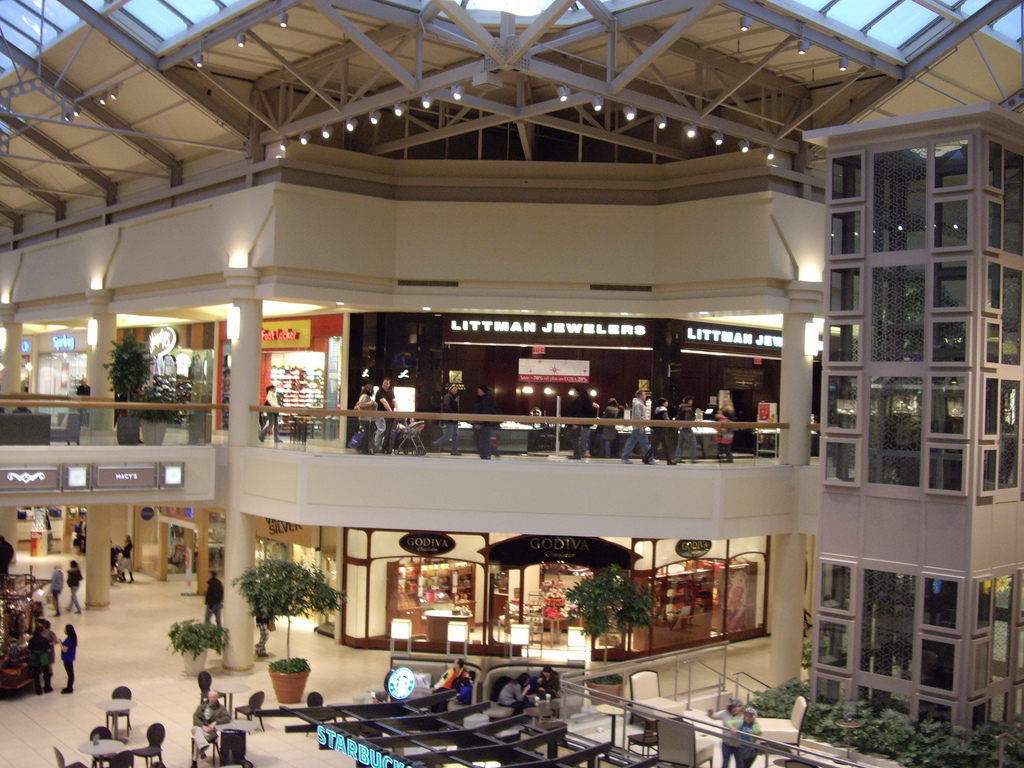
The Center Court post-renovation, January 2009

On July 18, 2011, Borders Books & Music announced that they will be liquidating all of their stores, including their Freehold location.

In September 2013, L.L.Bean opened their third New Jersey location inside the former Borders Books & Music anchor. They hosted a grand opening festival including giveaways, contests, and also a Birds of Prey exhibit as well.

On July 16, 2016, Primark joined the shopping center after Sears downsized to one floor.

=== 2020–present ===
The dawn of the 2020s saw several storied traditional department store retailers update its brick-and-mortar formats after being encroached upon to a degree by several digital retailers in recent years in addition to the COVID pandemic.

In May 2020, Nordstrom, which also maintains several outposts nearby, announced plans to shutter along with several additional locations as a direct result of pulling back due to the COVID-19 pandemic.

In August 2020, it was announced that specialty department store retailer Lord & Taylor would shutter its traditional brick and mortar format as a direct result of the COVID-19 pandemic.

On June 1, 2022, it was announced that Lidl will come in the former Bob's Stores.

By October 2022, after the government lockdown, Freehold Raceway Mall announced several additions, among them are Offline by Aerie, Elite Jewelers, Torrid, LoveSac, Lovisa, in addition to new formats for Aldo, Pandora, and a new much larger Apple format. As of 2023, a new Lidl occupies an outparcel space while a new Bob's Stores opened as an attached fixture at the mall next to Primark.

In May 2023, Apple relocated to a new location on the same story of the mall.

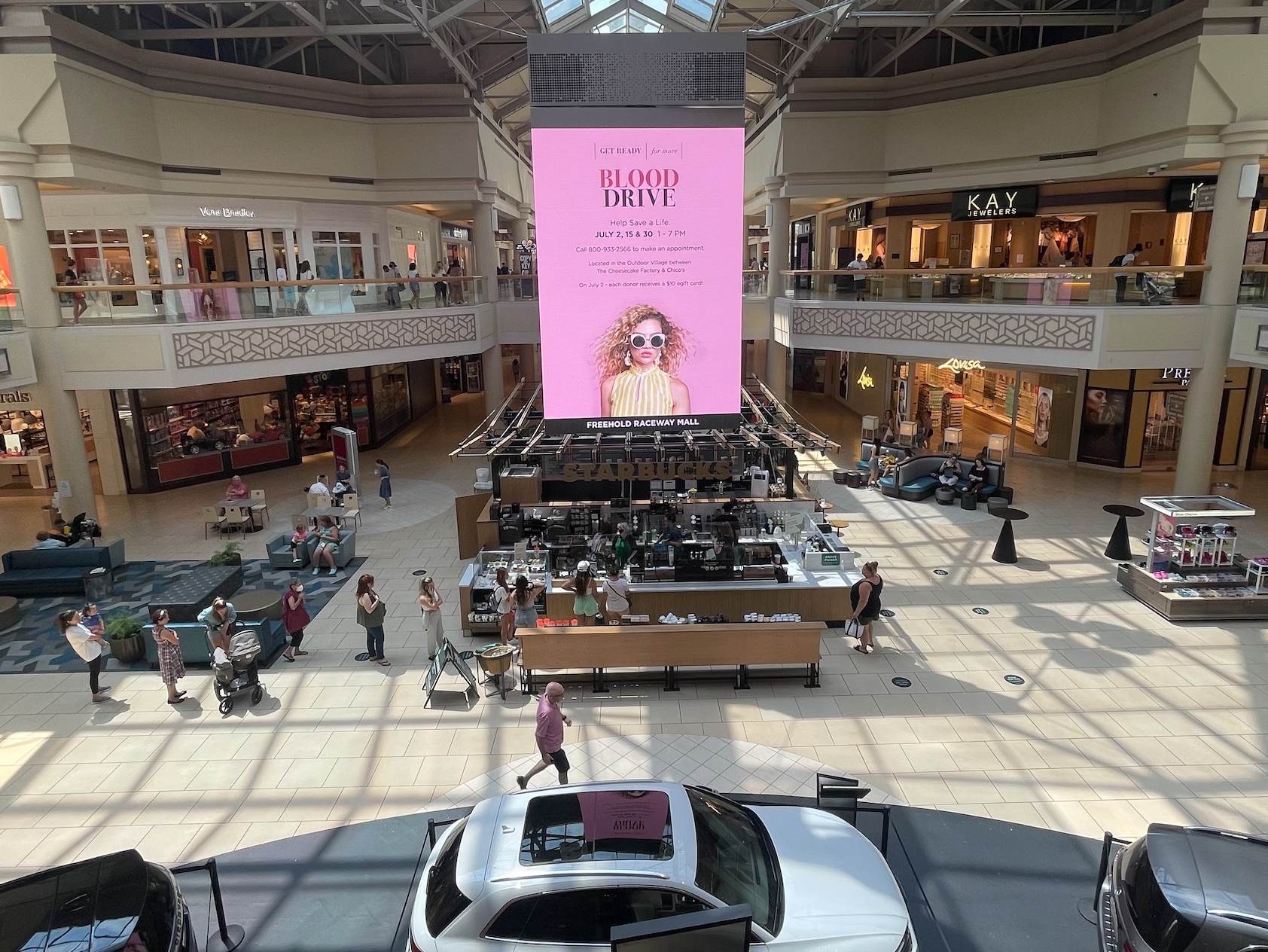
Freehold Raceway Mall center court, 2021

In May 2021, the Freehold Township Planning Committee proposed a rezoning ordinance to the shopping centers in the township, the Freehold Raceway Mall property notwithstanding. The township's Business Administrator Peter Valesi, expressed the interest to enhance the township's shopping centers. On July 13, 2021, the township planning board approved the amendment in a 3-1 decision. This legislation redefines the "regional mall" as a "regional mall shopping center".

The expansion of zoning allowances grants the owners of the mall the ability to include more commercial amenities, such as; movie theaters, performing arts venues, indoor amusement parks, roller rinks and other assortment of recreational activities. The rezoning could also allow the mall to offer designated civic, cultural and senior citizen centers, as well as educational spaces, office spaces, breweries, and health care facilities.

The rezoning policies will allow the mall to offer more 'lifestyle' amenities, which are becoming more commonplace in other prominent malls in the state (such as what can be found at the Willowbrook Mall in Wayne or the American Dream Mall in East Rutherford), while also still preserving the mall's upscale character.

In late 2023, it was announced that Dick's Sporting Goods would be opening a new "House of Sport" in the former Lord & Taylor space. It officially opened on October 31, 2025, which replaced the former (outparcel) location. This location, which is now an anchor to the Mall itself, features additional retail space, an athletic field, and other amenities.

In April 2024, it was announced that Freehold Athletic Club and Dave & Buster's would open on the lower level in the former Sears space. Dave & Buster's would open on May 12, 2025.

In May 2024, it was announced that the Bob's Stores location at the mall, one of 21 stores closing as part of a bankruptcy filing and the chain's only location in New Jersey.

On December 16, 2025, it was announced that Von Maur would be opening their first New Jersey location at the Freehold Raceway Mall in the former Nordstrom space. The store is set to open in fall 2027.

== See also ==
Danbury Fair Mall in Danbury, Connecticut - Built by developer Wilmorite a few years before Freehold Raceway Mall and also currently owned by Macerich. Due to both malls being built around the same time in the New York metropolitan area, utilizing similar interior design fixtures, along with both malls residing under relatively similar socioeconomic areas and thus offering similar stores, they are sometimes attributed as retail 'twins'.
