= Wilmorite Properties =

Commercial real estate firm

Wilmorite Properties, Inc.
- Industry: Real estate
- Founded: 1940s
- Founder: James P. Wilmot; William F. Wilmot
- Headquarters: Chili, New York
- Area served: Upstate New York
- Key people: Paul J. Wilmot, President; Thomas C. Wilmot, Chairman
- Services: Commercial real estate development and property management
- Website: www.wilmorite.com

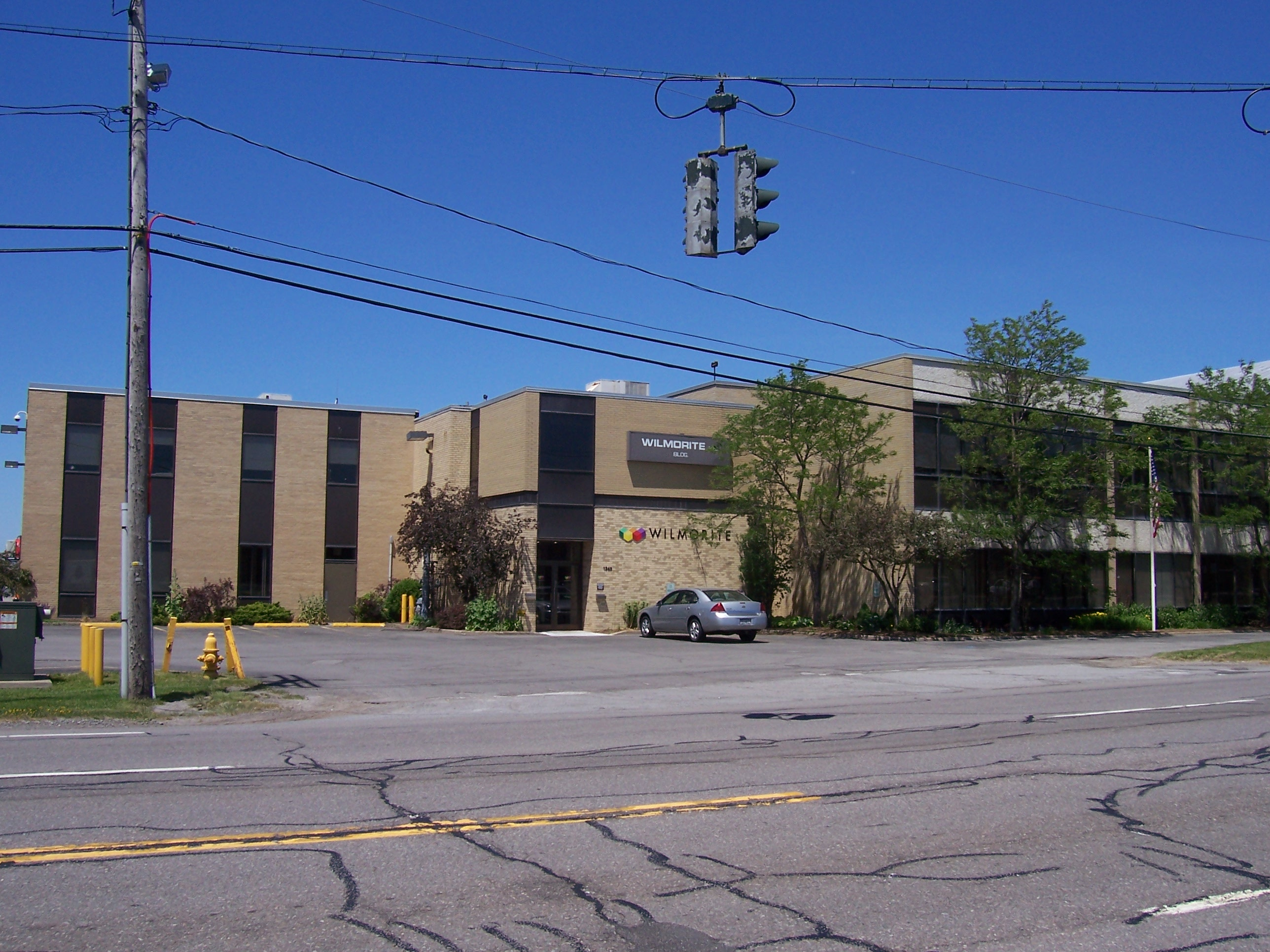
Wilmorite Properties headquarters on Scottsville Road in Rochester, New York

Wilmorite Properties, Inc is a commercial real estate company based in Chili, New York, a suburb of Rochester, New York.

The company manages Eastview Mall, The Mall at Greece Ridge, and The Marketplace Mall, all of which are in Rochester.

== History ==
James P. Wilmot founded the company in the 1940s and since then, Wilmorite has developed retail, office, hotel, and residential real estate.

In 1967, Wilmorite built Greece Towne Mall (now The Mall at Greece Ridge), one of the first enclosed regional malls in New York State. In 1993, Wilmorite bought Long Ridge Mall from the McCurdy's company and combined Greece Towne Mall and Long Ridge Mall in 1994, renaming it The Mall at Greece Ridge Center, dropping "Center" in 2006.

In 2003, it was reported that a subsidiary of the company owed significant back taxes and fees to the City of Rochester resulting from a loan and tax agreement surrounding the failed development of the Sibley Building.

In 2005, the majority of the assets of the company were acquired by Macerich.

== Notable former properties ==
- Camillus Mall
- Charlestowne Mall
- Danbury Fair Mall
- Fairmount Fair
- Fayetteville Mall
- Freehold Raceway Mall
- Great Northern Mall
- Irondequoit Mall
- Mohawk Mall
- Penn-Can Mall
- Rotterdam Square
- Shoppingtown Mall
- Sibley Building
- Tysons Corner Center
- Westshore Mall
- Wilton Mall at Saratoga
- Park Point at RIT
