= Glens Falls North, New York =

Queensbury
- CDP
- Location within the state of New York
- Coordinates: 43°19′57″N 73°40′59″W
- Country: United States
- State: New York
- County: Warren

Area
  - Total: 8.46 sq mi (21.92 km^{2})
  - Land: 8.37 sq mi (21.69 km^{2})
  - Water: 0.089 sq mi (0.23 km^{2})

Population (2020)
  - Total: 9,530
  - Density: 1,137.7/sq mi (439.28/km^{2})
- Time zone: UTC-5 (Eastern (EST))
  - Summer (DST): UTC-4 (EDT)
- FIPS code: 36-29338

Glens Falls North is a census-designated place (CDP) in Warren County, New York, United States. It is part of the Glens Falls Metropolitan Statistical Area. The CDP population was 9,530 at the 2020 census. It lies north of the city of Glens Falls, in the town of Queensbury.

== Geography ==
According to the United States Census Bureau, the CDP has a total area of 8.2 square miles (21 km^{2}), of which 8.1 square miles (21 km^{2}) is land and 0.1 square miles (0.26 km^{2}) (1.70%) is water.

== Demographics ==
Historical population
Census	Pop.	Note	%±
2020	9,530		—
U.S. Decennial Census

=== 2020 census ===
As of the 2020 census, Glens Falls North had a population of 9,530. The median age was 47.3 years. 19.1% of residents were under the age of 18 and 24.8% of residents were 65 years of age or older. For every 100 females there were 91.5 males, and for every 100 females age 18 and over there were 85.6 males age 18 and over.

99.7% of residents lived in urban areas, while 0.3% lived in rural areas.

There were 4,352 households in Glens Falls North, of which 23.7% had children under the age of 18 living in them. Of all households, 41.7% were married-couple households, 17.9% were households with a male householder and no spouse or partner present, and 32.4% were households with a female householder and no spouse or partner present. About 35.2% of all households were made up of individuals and 17.5% had someone living alone who was 65 years of age or older.

There were 4,692 housing units, of which 7.2% were vacant. The homeowner vacancy rate was 0.8% and the rental vacancy rate was 9.0%.

Racial composition as of the 2020 census
Race	Number	Percent
White	8,637	90.6%
Black or African American	102	1.1%
American Indian and Alaska Native	23	0.2%
Asian	167	1.8%
Native Hawaiian and Other Pacific Islander	1	0.0%
Some other race	87	0.9%
Two or more races	513	5.4%
Hispanic or Latino (of any race)	267	2.8%

=== 2000 census ===
As of the 2000 census, there were 8,061 people, 3,533 households, and 2,254 families residing in the CDP. The population density was 996.4 inhabitants per square mile (384.7/km^{2}). There were 3,689 housing units at an average density of 456.0 per square mile (176.1/km^{2}). The racial makeup of the CDP was 96.96% White, 0.76% African American, 0.11% Native American, 1.04% Asian, 0.02% Pacific Islander, 0.29% from other races, and 0.82% from two or more races. Hispanic or Latino of any race were 1.31% of the population.

There were 3,533 households, out of which 27.7% had children under the age of 18 living with them, 51.3% were married couples living together, 9.9% had a female householder with no husband present, and 36.2% were non-families. 31.0% of all households were made up of individuals, and 17.1% had someone living alone who was 65 years of age or older. The average household size was 2.28 and the average family size was 2.86.

In the CDP, the population was spread out, with 22.8% under the age of 18, 6.2% from 18 to 24, 25.5% from 25 to 44, 26.1% from 45 to 64, and 19.4% who were 65 years of age or older. The median age was 42 years. For every 100 females, there were 86.2 males. For every 100 females age 18 and over, there were 81.4 males.

The median income for a household in the CDP was $42,424, and the median income for a family was $56,647. Males had a median income of $40,816 versus $25,388 for females. The per capita income for the CDP was $27,460. About 6.3% of families and 7.1% of the population were below the poverty line, including 12.4% of those under age 18 and 2.5% of those age 65 or over.

== See also ==
- List of census-designated places in New York
