= Dey Brothers =

Department store chain in New York

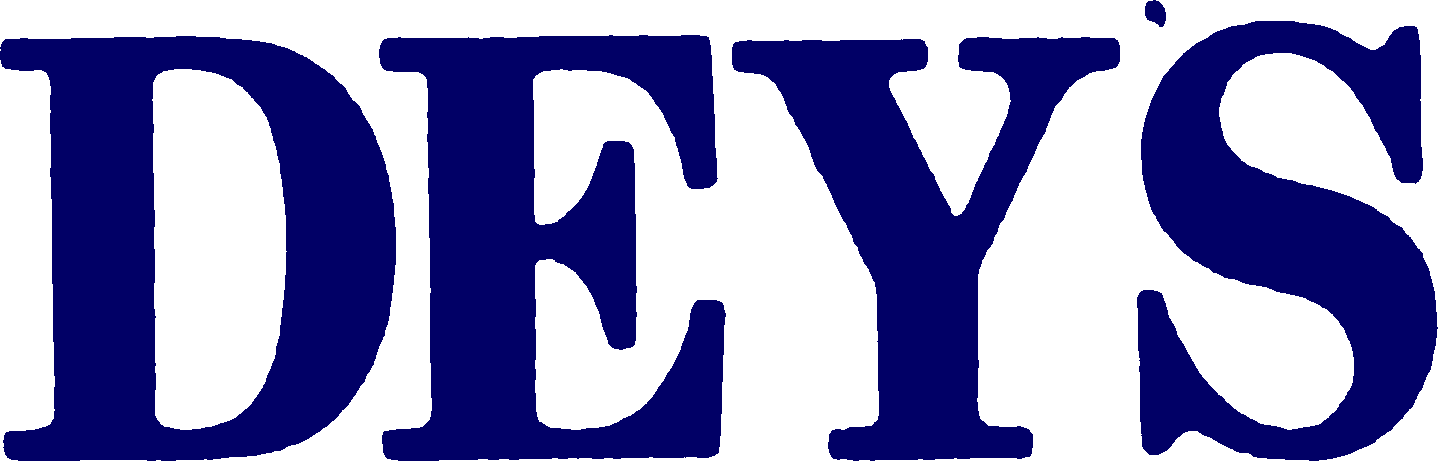
- Company type: Department Store
- Industry: Retail
- Founded: 1883
- Defunct: 1991
- Fate: Merged with Sage-Allen stores to become Sage-Dey
- Headquarters: Syracuse, New York
- Key people: Ned Munley
- Products: Clothing, footwear, jewelry, beauty products, and housewares.
- Website: None

Dey Brothers was a department store located in and around Syracuse, New York.

== History ==
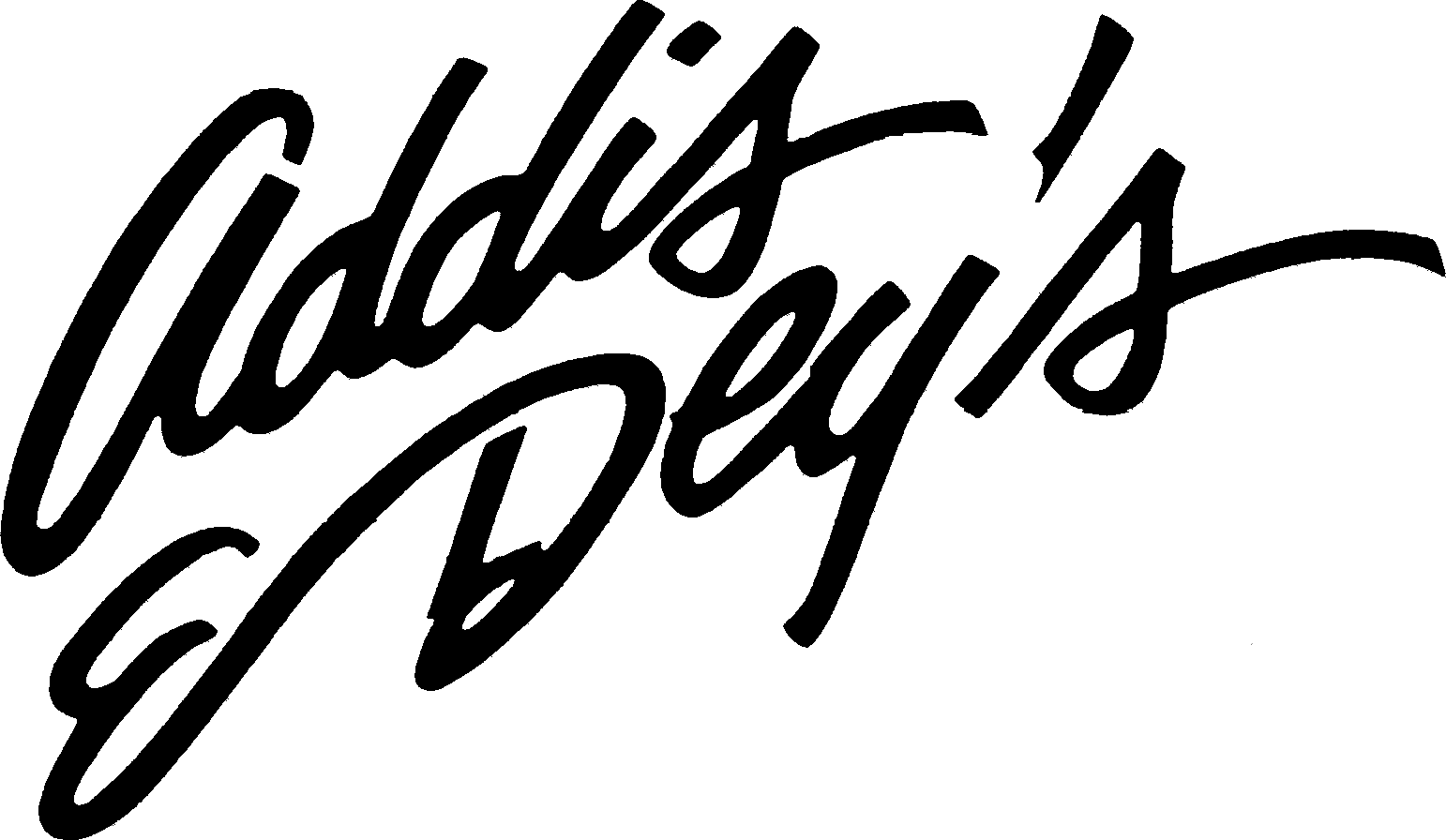
Addis & Dey's logo created when the two department stores merged.

Price and McCarthy Dey were Scottish immigrants who settled in Syracuse in 1883, opening their first store at 205 South Salina Street.

In 1936, with 34 locations and an annual sales volume between US$2,000,000 and US$2,500,000, the department store chain was bought by Allied Stores. Dey's, a part of Allied Stores Co., was purchased by Campeau Corp. in 1986 and sold off in 1987 to May Company, the parent company of Dey's rival, Sibley's. The Addis Company and changed its name to Addis & Dey's. In 1991 the company was merged with Sage-Allen stores to become Sage-Dey. The downtown store closed in 1992. All stores closed in 1993.
