= Chappell's =

C. E. Chappell & Sons, Inc.
- Type: Department store
- Industry: Retail
- Founded: 1896
- Defunct: 1994
- Headquarters: North Syracuse, New York
- Key people: Charles A. Chappell Jr.; Donald E. Chappell; Charles Chappell III; Earl Sherlock
- Products: Clothing, footwear, jewelry, beauty products, and housewares.
- Website: None

Chappell's was a family-owned department store chain based in Syracuse, New York. It opened in 1896 and remained in business until 1994. At its peak, it operated ten stores in the Syracuse area, Cortland, Watertown and Massena. In no particular order, malls that had a Chappell's store included Great Northern Mall (Clay, NY); Western Lights Plaza (Valley area of Syracuse, NY); Northern Lights (Mattydale, NY); Shoppingtown Mall (Dewitt, NY); Penn-Can Mall (Cicero, NY); Carousel Center (known as Destiny USA after 2012 in Syracuse, NY); Shop City Plaza (Syracuse, NY); Fingerlakes Mall (Auburn, NY); Seneca Mall (Liverpool, NY); Salmon Run Mall (Watertown, NY). There was also a stand alone store in downtown Syracuse.

In January 1992, the corporation filed for bankruptcy protection under Chapter 11. As part of reorganization, four of the stores closed. Under pressure from creditors, chairman Charles A. Chappell Jr., grandson of the founder, sold the company and remaining six stores to Bon-Ton Stores in October 1994.
