= Granite Building (Rochester, New York) =

Historic commercial building in New York, United States

- U.S. National Register of Historic Places
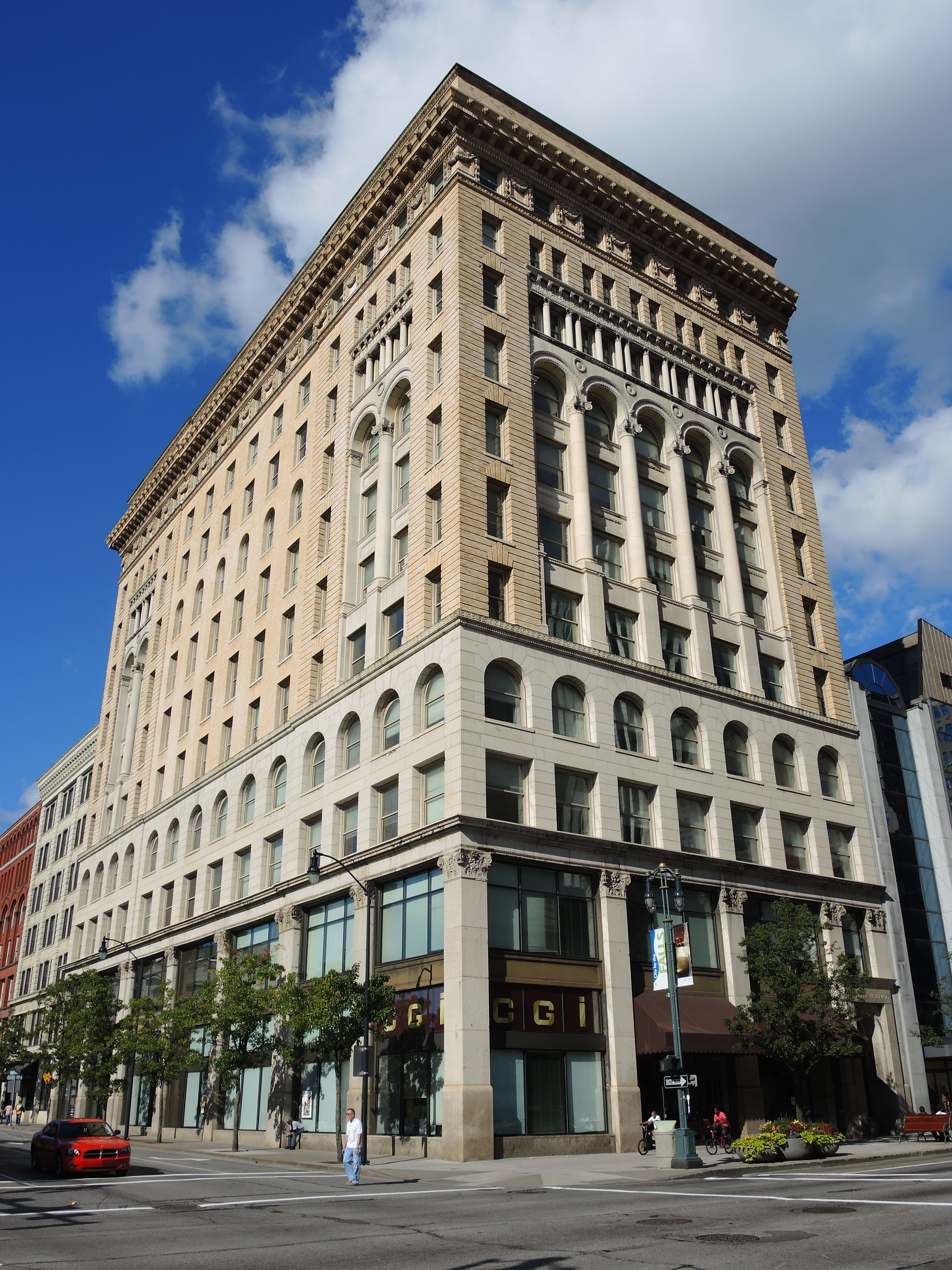
- Granite Building, September 2013

- Location within New York Location within the United States
- Location: 124 E. Main St., Rochester, New York
- Coordinates: 43°9′25″N 77°36′33″W
- Area: less than one acre
- Built: 1893
- Architect: Warner, J. Foster; Sibley, Lindsay & Curr Co.
- Architectural style: Renaissance
- MPS: Department Store TR
- NRHP reference No.: 84000290
- Added to NRHP: October 11, 1984

The Granite Building is a historic department store building located at 124 East Main Street in Rochester, Monroe County, New York.

== Description and history ==
The building was designed by J. Foster Warner in 1893 and, at 12 stories with 23 acres (9 ha) of floor space, was the city's first skeletal steel skyscraper. Its facade is a mix of Second Renaissance Revival style and Beaux-Arts style classical details. It is characterized by recessed, monumental, four story granite columns supporting recessed arches. It was built by Sibley, Lindsay & Curr Company and served as their flagship store until the "Sibley fire" of 1904, when the flagship moved to the Sibley's, Lindsay and Curr Building. It is now an office building, housing a number of companies.

It was listed on the National Register of Historic Places on October 11, 1984.

== Gallery ==
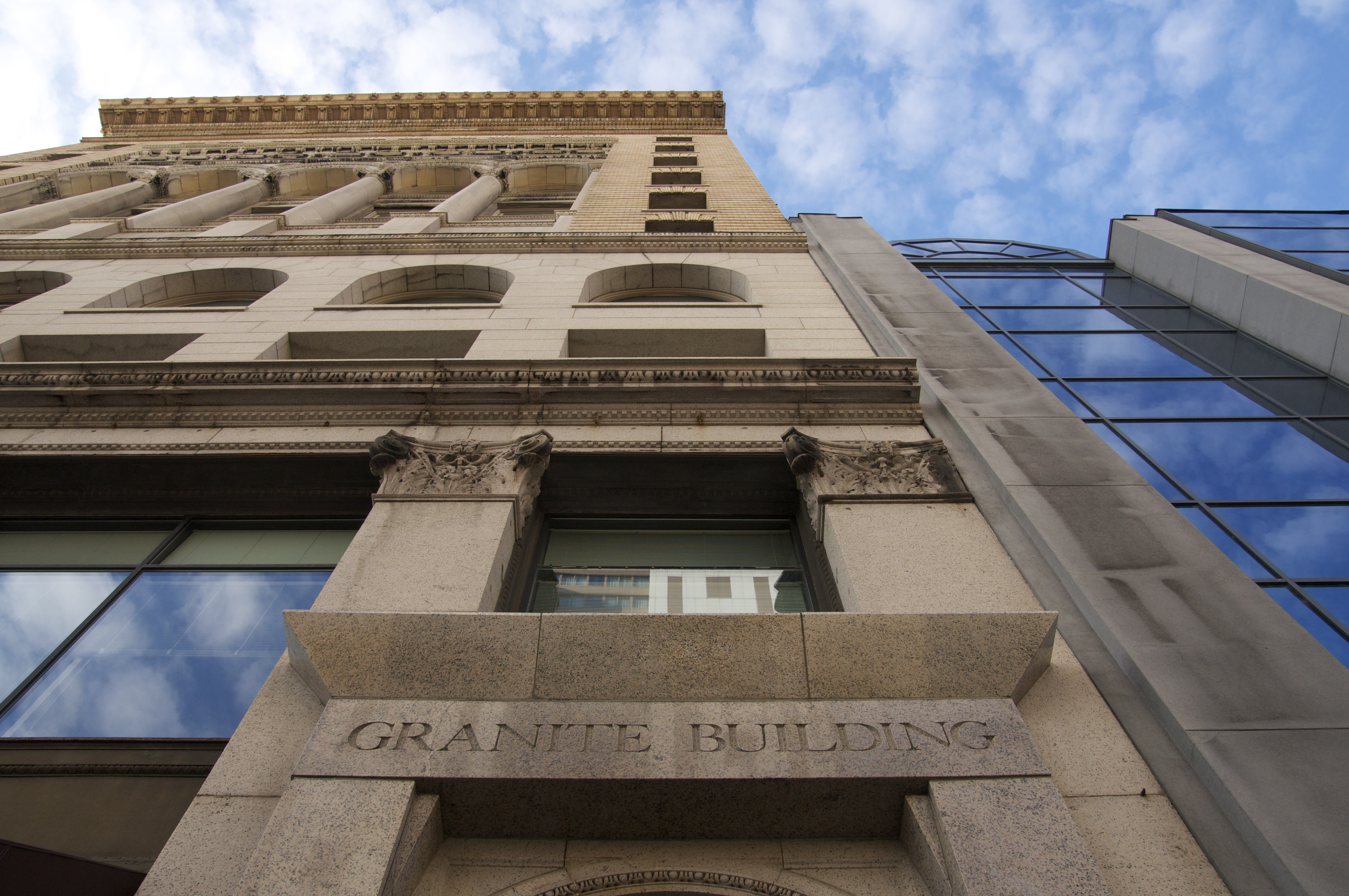

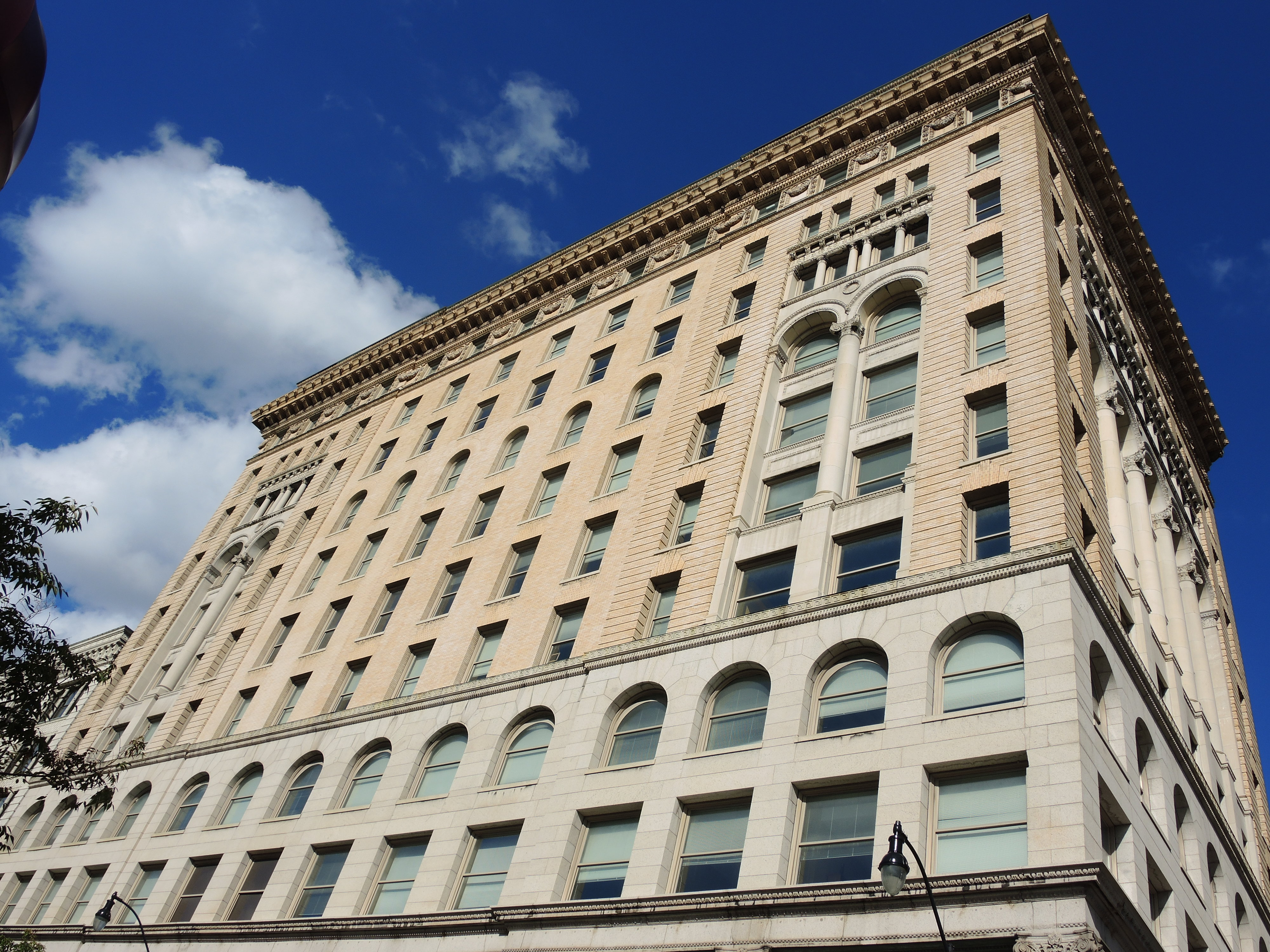
