= J. Foster Warner =

American architect

John Foster Warner (1859–1937) was a Rochester, New York–based architect. He was the son of one of Rochester's most prominent 19th century architects, Andrew Jackson Warner (1833–1910). After receiving his architectural training in his father's office, the younger Warner opened his own office in 1889 and remained in continuous practice until his death in 1937.

== Selected works ==
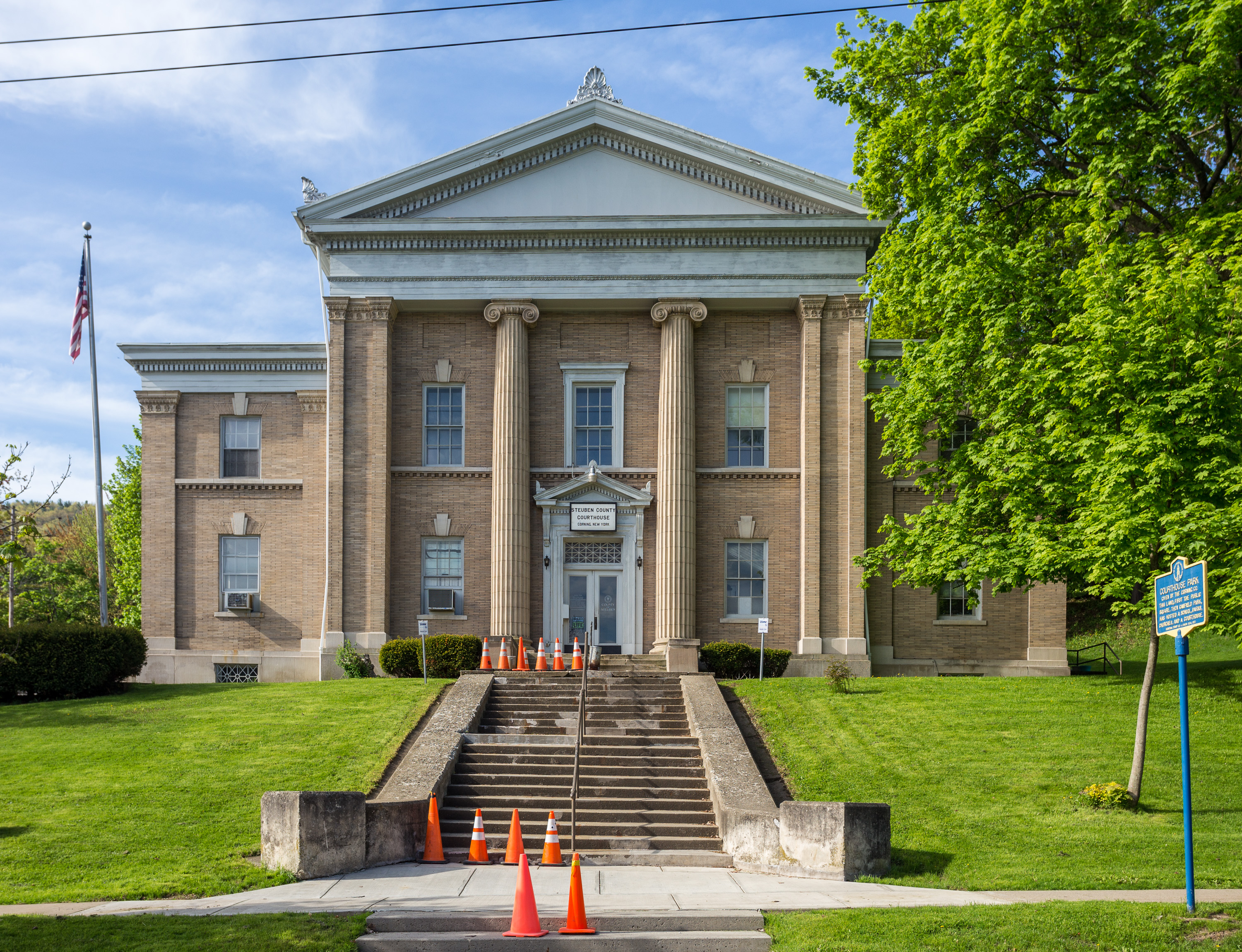
Steuben County Courthouse (1903)

- 1893: Granite Building, Rochester, New York, listed on the National Register of Historic Places in 1984.
- 1894-1896: Monroe County Courthouse, Rochester, New York, listed on the National Register of Historic Places in 1974 as a contributing structure.
- 1897: Sibley Triangle Building, Rochester, New York, listed on the National Register of Historic Places in 1985.
- 1902: East High School, Rochester, New York, listed on the National Register of Historic Places in 1983.
- 1903: Steuben County Courthouse, Corning, New York
- 1903: Brick Presbyterian Church Complex, Rochester, New York, listed on the National Register of Historic Places in 1992.
- 1904: Sibley's, Lindsay and Curr Building, Rochester, New York, listed on the National Register of Historic Places in 2014.
- 1905: George Eastman House, Rochester, New York, designated a National Historic Landmark in 1966.
- 1924: National Company Building, Rochester, New York, listed on the National Register of Historic Places in 1984.
- 1926: Rowe House, Wayland, New York, listed on the National Register of Historic Places in 2008.
- 1928: Our Lady of Mercy High School, Rochester, New York, listed as Historic Landmark, Town of Brighton, New York.
