= Sibley's, Lindsay and Curr Building =

Historic high-rise building in Rochester, New York

- U.S. National Register of Historic Places
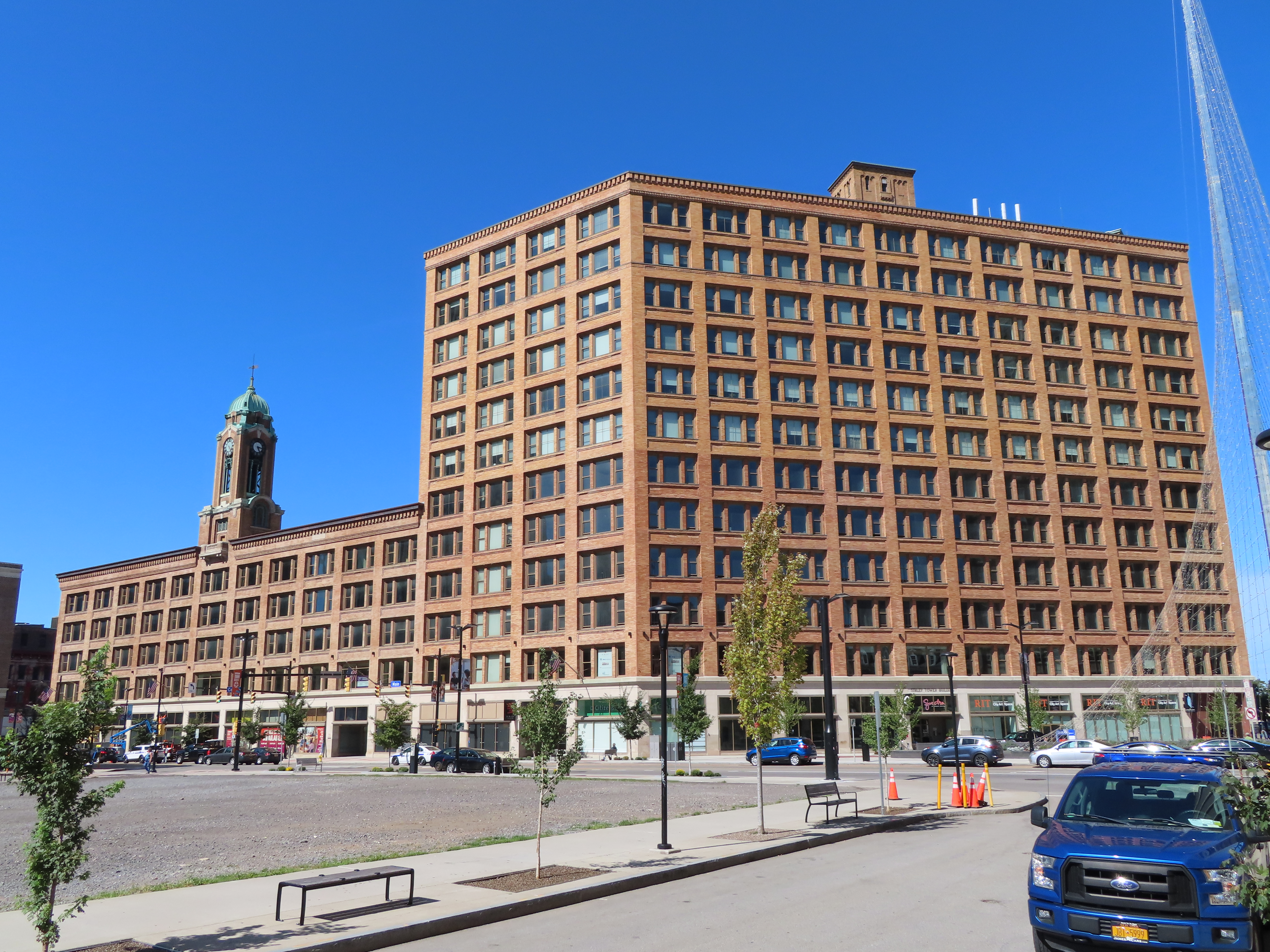
- Sibley's, Lindsay and Curr Building, 2019

- Location within New York Location within the United States
- Location: 250 E. Main St., Rochester, New York
- Coordinates: 43°9′29″N 77°36′21″W
- Built: 1904 (Renovated 1911 & 1924)
- Architect: Warner, J. Foster
- Architectural style: Chicago School
- Website: Official website
- MPS: Inner Loop MRA
- NRHP reference No.: 84003945
- Added to NRHP: January 8, 2014

Sibley's, Lindsay and Curr Building is a historic commercial building located at Rochester in Monroe County, New York. It was designed by noted Rochester architect J. Foster Warner and built for Sibley's in 1904. The original wing of the building was constructed in 1906 as a five-story, Chicago school style skeletal steel building sheathed in brown Roman brick with deeply set Chicago style windows, topped by a clock tower with Baroque and Renaissance style details. Additions were made to the building in 1911 and 1924, including a 12-story tower section.

It was listed on the National Register of Historic Places in 2014.

== History ==
=== Overview ===
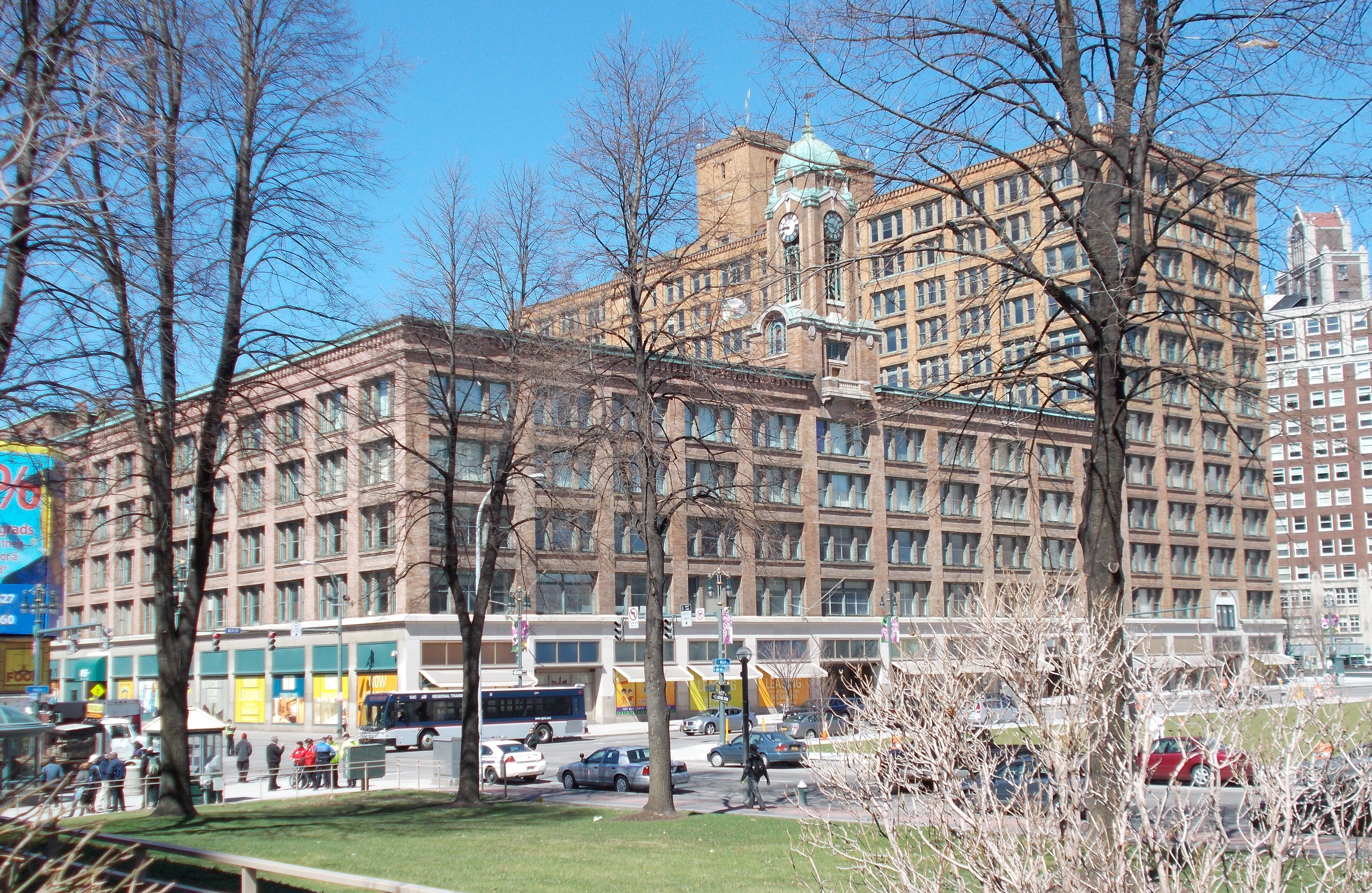
Sibley's, Lindsay and Curr Building April 2014

In 1905, after the disastrous 1904 "Sibley fire" gutted the Granite Building and much of Rochester's dry goods district, Sibley's moved to its final location, the Sibley Building at the northeast corner of East Main Street and Clinton Avenue. By 1939, Sibley's was the largest department store between New York City and Chicago. Sibley's was acquired by The May Department Stores Company and the Sibley Building location closed in the early 1990s.

=== Liberty Pole Plaza ===
Located outside of the Sibley Building is Rochester's historic Liberty Pole Plaza, a public gathering space containing a large metal sculpture known as the Liberty Pole. The Liberty Pole has been a pillar of the Rochester Community for many decades and in many images the Sibley Building provides a backdrop to the metallic artwork, taking its place in a number of historic photos throughout the years. The current 190-foot metal structure was erected in 1965, the third such structure on the site after two previous Liberty poles made from wood in the 1800s.

=== Monroe Community College - Damon City Campus ===
The Sibley Building was formerly home to State University of New York's MCC Downtown Campus, Damon City Campus. The campus opened in 1991 as the college's second campus and remained in the building until completion of its new Downtown Campus, located in the Kodak Tower, headquarters of the Kodak company.

== Current - Sibley Square ==
Today, the building is owned by WinnCompanies of Boston, and was re-developed into a multi-use building. After the purchase, the building was renamed to Sibley Square, and its address was updated from 228 East Main Street to 250 East Main Street. The ground floor of the building contains retail space including a DGX Grocery and a food court called Mercantile on Main, while the upper floors contain office space and luxury apartments.

== See also ==
- List of tallest buildings in Rochester, New York
