= Bill Boomer =

American swimming coach (1937–2022)

Biographical details
- Born: April 13, 1937; Rochester, New York
- Died: January 9, 2022 (aged 84); Clifford Township, PA.
- Height: 188 cm (6 ft 2 in)
- Education: Springfield College, MA

Playing career
- 1953-1955: East High School
- Position: All Scholastic Soccer Fullback

Coaching career (HC unless noted)
- 1962-1969: University of Rochester; Track, Asst. Coach
- 1965-1969: University of Rochester Men's Soccer
- 1962-1990: University of Rochester Swimming
- 1990-: Stanford University Swimming (Asst. Coach)
- '96 -'04: U.S. Olympic Team; Technique Coach

Head coaching record
- Overall: 168-107; Rochester swimming 24-26-3; Rochester soccer

Accomplishments and honors

Championships
- 1984-1987 New York State Championships (Swimming)

Awards
- U of Rochester Hall of Fame '07; 1998 UAA Coaching Staff of the Year; CSCAA Master Coach '90; CSCAA Ben Franklin Award '14; For Stroke Technique

William Boomer (April 13, 1937 – January 9, 2022), also known as Buzz Boomer, was an American college coach, best known for serving as the head coach of the University of Rochester's men's swim team from 1962 to 1990. Beginning in the 1990s, as a noted authority on swimming technique, Boomer gave technique instruction to swimmers on the Stanford University swim team and worked one-on-one with many world-class swimmers, including many on three American Olympic swim teams from 1996 to 2004.

== Early life ==
Boomer was born the son of George and Grace Boomer in Rochester, New York, in January 1937, where he graduated East High School around 1955. At East, he received All-Greater Rochester honors as a soccer player, but was not on the swim team. The 6', 2", (188 cm) fullback was also the recipient of All-Scholastic soccer team honors while playing for East, receiving the most votes in 1955 from the local Democrat and Chronicle newspaper, and had been recognized with the honor by the newspaper each year from 1953 to 1955. In 1961, he completed a B.S. from Springfield College in Massachusetts and then received a Masters in Education from the University of Rochester in 1963. He began in the physical education department at Rochester immediately after graduating from Springfield, working there as a graduate student.

As an adolescent, Boomer lost several fingers in a farming accident, and he credited coping with the trauma of that episode as an integral part of shaping many of his life and coaching philosophies.

== Swim coaching at Rochester ==
Boomer had no experience coaching swimming when he started at Rochester. The graduate assistant to the track and field team had in fact never seen a swim meet prior to being offered the job. In order to better understand his swimmers, Boomer studied how the human body reacted to the water in a pool. From there, Boomer developed swimming techniques similar to those used by aquatic animals that would eventually be adapted by some of the best swimmers in the world. Boomer's techniques emphasize keeping the core body aligned properly to minimize water resistance.

Early in Boomer's career as the University of Rochester Varsity Swim coach, he coached the 1966–1967 Men's Varsity Swim Team to an undefeated season, 11–0. This was the first of many other successful swim seasons. Besides working as a coach, while at Rochester he helped design the Speegle-Wilbraham Aquatics Center in 1982, and served as an Associate Dean and Athletic Director during his tenure. Boomer was inducted into the University of Rochester Athletic Hall of Fame in 2007. He and his coaching staff were named the 1998 UAA Coaching Staff of the Year. From his careful study of swimming dynamics, Boomer is credited with originating the top-arm backstroke breakout, a technique for starting backstroke events.

=== Rochester Track and soccer coach ===
Boomer also coached the men's soccer team at the University of Rochester from 1965 to 1969, leading the team to a 24–26–3 record. From 1962 to 1969, Boomer served as an Assistant Track team coach at Rochester as well.

=== Swimming technique advisor ===
After 1990, Boomer worked as an assistant coach and technique advisor for swimmers at Stanford University. Giving back to the swimming community, Boomer also worked as a volunteer technique advisor to swimmers at Princeton, and in 2012 at the University of Tennessee. He continued to coach swimmers in technique in various capacities and in different venues through 2020.

=== Olympic swim coaching ===
Boomer was a technique coach for the 2000 U.S. Olympic team in Sydney. He was also a technical advisor on the U.S. Olympic teams in 1996 and 2004.

Boomer and his second wife, Sally Fischbeck, resided in Clifford, Pennsylvania. He had two adult children from a previous marriage. He died at home in Clifford on January 9, 2022, at the age of 84.

== Notable protégés ==
- Josh Davis, world record-holder and Olympic gold-medalist
- James A. Pawelczyk, NASA astronaut
- Jenny Thompson, world record-holder and Olympic gold-medalist
- Dara Torres, world record-holder and Olympic gold-medalist
- Amy Van Dyken, world record-holder and Olympic gold-medalist
