= Sibley Triangle Building =

Historic commercial building in New York, United States

- U.S. National Register of Historic Places
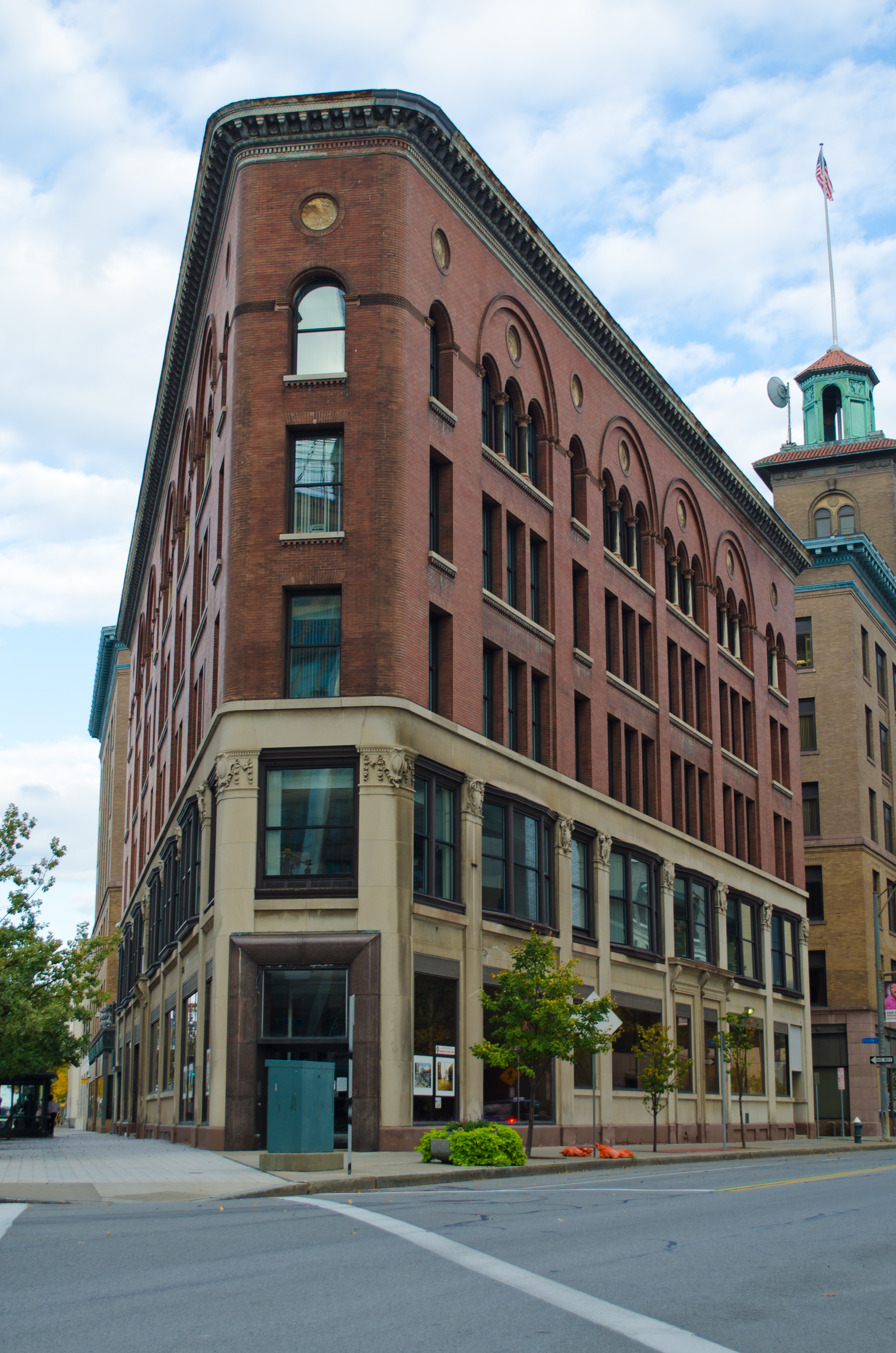
- Sibley Triangle Building, October 2012

- Location within New York Location within the United States
- Location: 20-30 East Ave., Rochester, New York
- Coordinates: 43°9′26″N 77°36′15″W
- Area: less than one acre
- Built: 1897
- Architect: Warner, J. Foster; Finucane, T.W.
- Architectural style: Late 19th And 20th Century Revivals, Italian Renaissance
- MPS: Inner Loop MRA
- NRHP reference No.: 85002849
- Added to NRHP: October 04, 1985

Sibley Triangle Building is a historic commercial building located at Rochester in Monroe County, New York. It is a five-story, triangular, flat-iron shaped, brick commercial building with Indiana limestone and marble trim on the first two stories. It was built in 1897 and is a distinguished example of eclectic Italian Renaissance style architecture. It was designed by noted Rochester architect J. Foster Warner and built for Hiram W. Sibley, a son of Hiram Sibley.

It was listed on the National Register of Historic Places in 1985.
