= Rowe House (Wayland, New York) =

Historic house in New York, United States

- U.S. National Register of Historic Places
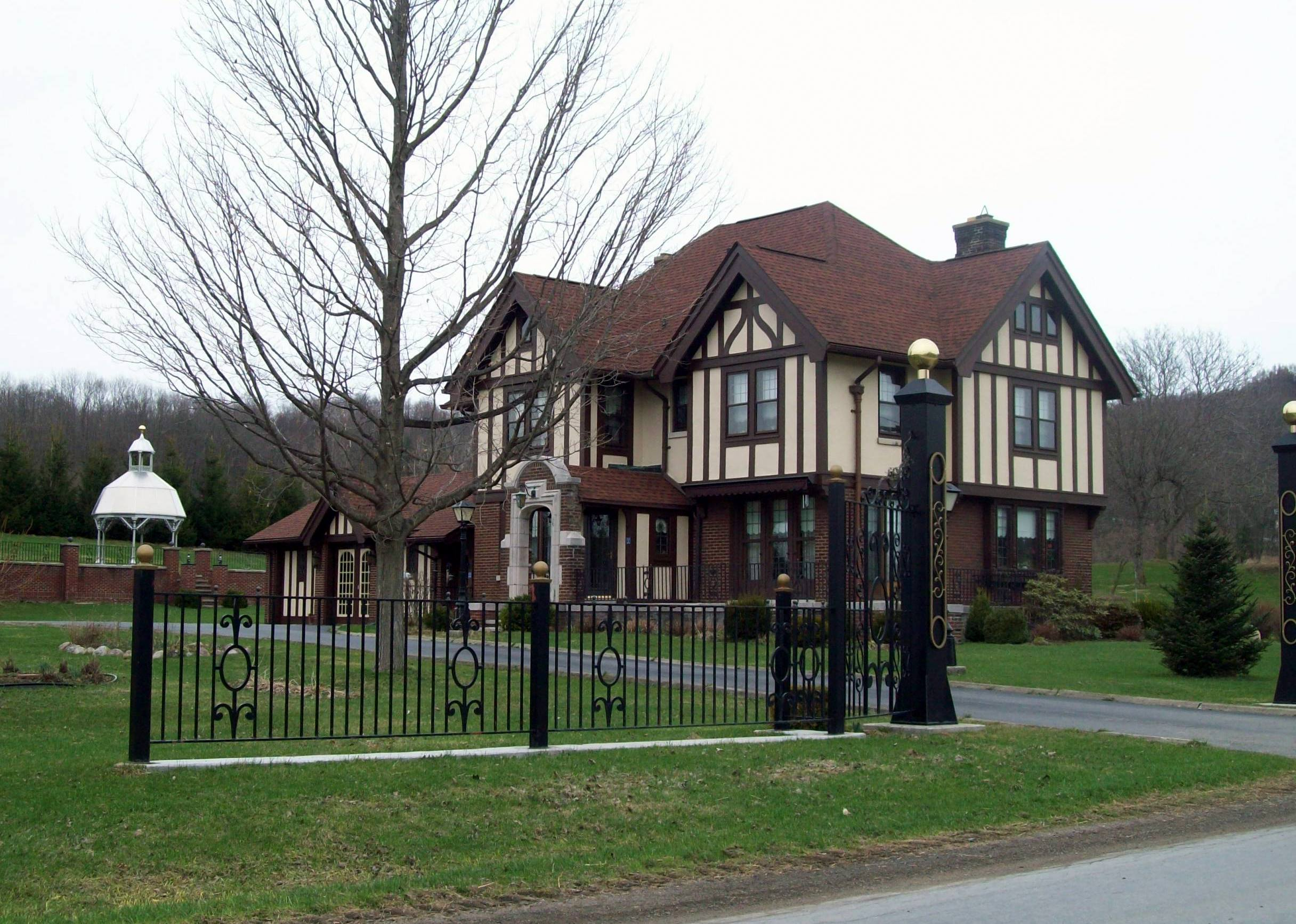
- Rowe House, April 2011

- Location within New York Location within the United States
- Location: 11763 County Road 38 / Rowe Road, Wayland, New York
- Nearest city: Wayland, New York
- Coordinates: 42°34′20″N 77°29′10″W
- Area: 28.8 acres (11.7 ha)
- Built: 1926
- Architect: Warner, J. Foster
- Architectural style: Tudor Revival
- NRHP reference No.: 08000039
- Added to NRHP: February 19, 2008

Rowe House is a historic home located at Wayland in Steuben County, New York, United States. It is a large three-by-seven-bay Tudor Revival– style residential building with an attached 1-story, three-bay garage wing at the rear. It was designed in 1926 by noted Rochester architect J. Foster Warner.

It was listed on the National Register of Historic Places in 2008.
