= East High School (Rochester, New York) =

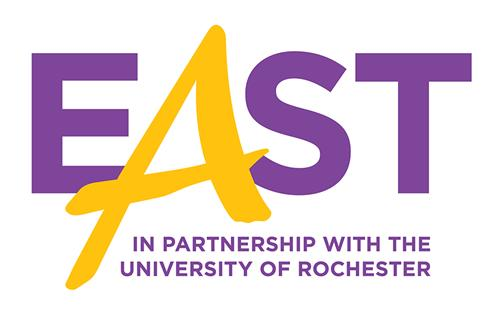

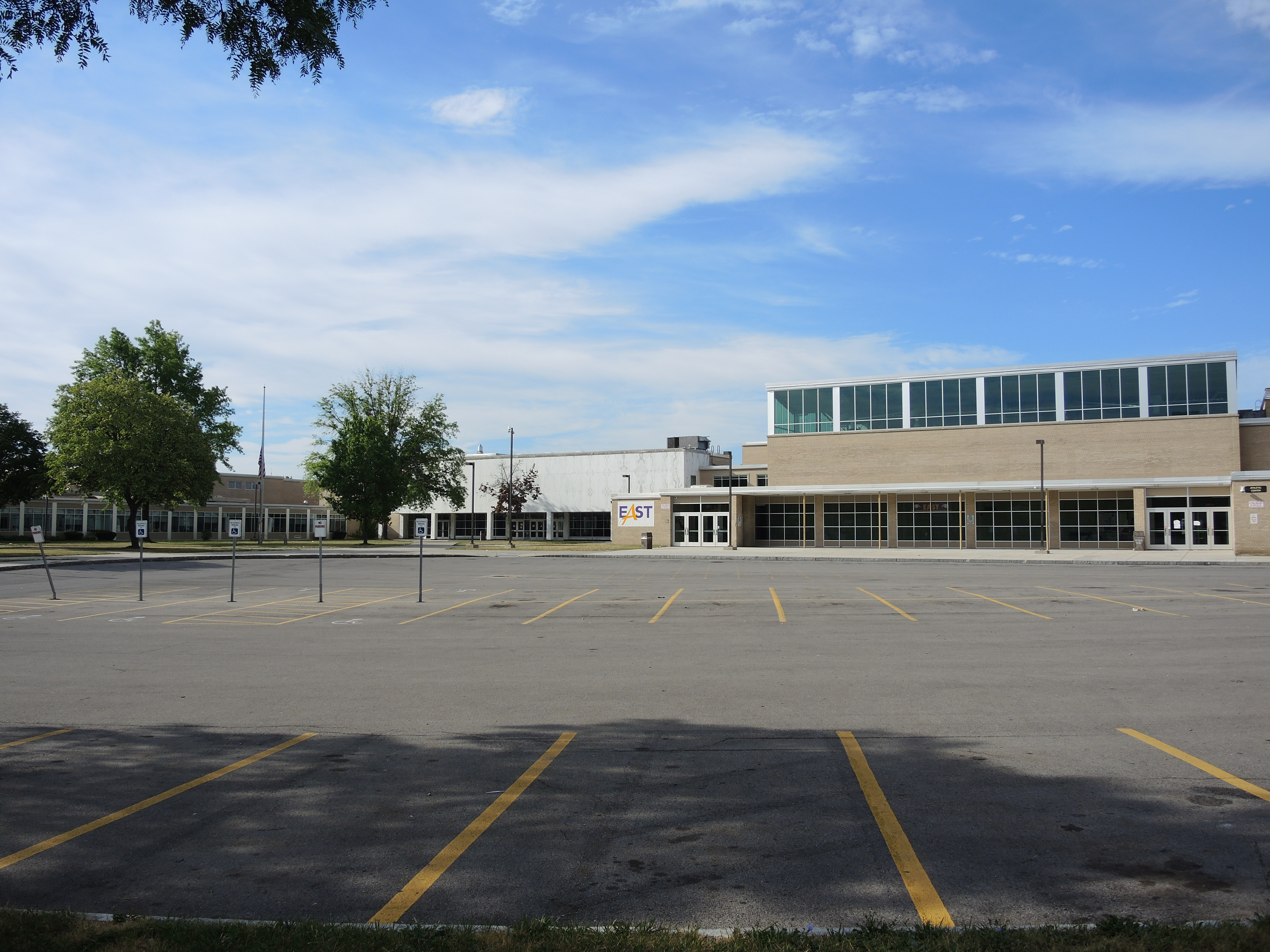

Location
- 1801 East Main St; Rochester, New York 14609; United States

Information
- Type: Public
- Motto: We have the power to change the world... now let's get to work.
- Established: 1902
- School district: Rochester City School District
- Superintendent: Marlene Blocker
- NCES School ID: 362475003363
- Upper School principal: Edward Mascadri
- Lower School principal: Leandrew Wingo
- Teaching staff: 46.21 (Lower School); 95.05 (Upper School) (on an FTE basis)
- Grades: 6-8 (Lower School); 9-12 (Upper School)
- Enrollment: 363 (Lower School); 780 (Upper School) (2023-2024)
- Student to teacher ratio: 7.86 (Lower School); 8.21 (Upper School)
- Campus: Urban
- Colors: Purple and Gold
- Mascot: Echo the Eagle
- Team name: Eagles
- Newspaper: The Eagle Express
- Yearbook: The Orient
- Website: www.rcsdk12.org
- East High School
- U.S. National Register of Historic Places
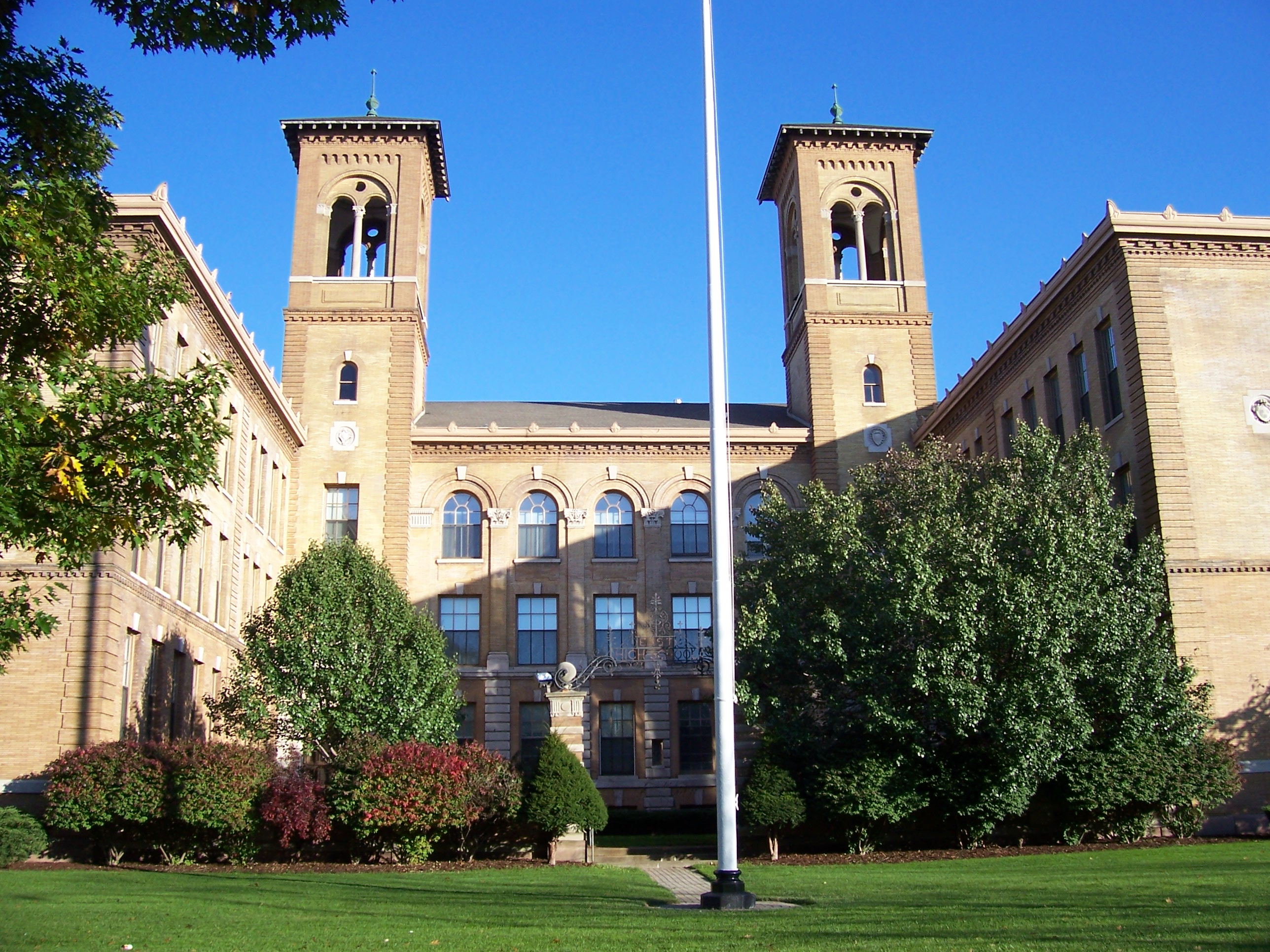

- Location within New York Location within the United States
- Location: 410 Alexander St., Rochester, New York
- Coordinates: 43°9′35″N 77°35′31″W
- Area: 3 acres (1.2 ha)
- Built: 1902
- Architect: Warner, J. Foster
- Architectural style: Late 19th And 20th Century Revivals, Italian Renaissance
- NRHP reference No.: 83001707
- Added to NRHP: June 30, 1983

East High School is a public high school serving the sixth through twelfth grade in Rochester, New York, and is part of the Rochester City School District, and in partnership with the University of Rochester as the school's Educational Partnership Organization (EPO). The school opened in 1902 on 410 Alexander St, and was designed by noted Rochester architect J. Foster Warner. The school was later moved in 1959 to its current location, 1801 East Main Street. Since 2002, changes have occurred, including the re-addition of a junior high and the splitting of the school into separate academies.

== Partnership with the University of Rochester ==
In May 2014, the New York State Education Department granted the University of Rochester's request to take over management of East High School. Beginning in the 2015-2016 school year, the University will implement a plan in their efforts to "increase learning opportunities" for students.

== Schools ==
East High currently contains two separate schools for their students, each with staggering start times. Their Lower School is for students in grades 6-8 and their Upper School is for students grades 9-12. There is a separate academy for their 9th grade students in the Upper School known as the Freshman Academy.

== Lower School ==
The Lower School, formerly known as the Foundation Academy, is for students in grades 6-8. Their current principal is Leeandrew Wingo. In the Lower School, the students have their own place within the East High building, creating a small school atmosphere. The Lower School currently has around 180 students per grade level, small classes in core subjects, and a focus on college and career readiness and lifelong success.

== Upper School ==
The Upper School is for students in grades 9-12. Their current principal is Marlene Blocker. The school offers a full range of classes leading up to the Regents diploma, including career and technical pathways as well as AP and early-college classes. Some of these career and technical pathways include Culinary Arts, Information Technology, Advanced Manufacturing, Teaching, Business, and Health Related Careers. In addition to all of this, every student in the Upper School will have access to the full range of BOCES programs.

== Freshman Academy ==
The 9th graders in the Upper School have their own wing of the building, with extra support, extended time for math and literacy, and opportunities to complete four or more high school credits. The 9th graders also have their own lunch period, their own PE classes, their own period for Family Group, 4 counselors, 2 social workers, and alternative programs for scholars not on track after the 9th grade. The current director for the Freshman Academy is Deon Rodgers.

== Performance ==
With the University of Rochester agreement through the EPO, the school has overcome many challenges. The school offers many unique options for graduation pathways offering successful transition post secondary The graduation rate of East High in 2009 was 39% and as of June 2020 was 74%.

== Student body/demographics ==
African American: 50.8%
Hispanic: 35.4%
White: 8.1%
Not Specified: 4.9%
Two or more races: 0.4%
American Indian: 0.3%

86.3% of the students at East High School receive a free/reduced lunch rate.

== Notable alumni ==
- Kim Batten, 400 meter hurdles champion
- William L. Boomer, University of Rochester Swim Coach, 1962-1990, and American Olympic swim team advisor for three Olympics.
- Al Butler, NBA basketball player for the Boston Celtics
- Midge Costanza, American Presidential advisor, social and political activist
- Walter Dukes, NBA basketball player for the New York Knicks
- Ed Edmondson, former president of the United States Chess Federation
- Lester Harrison, member of the Basketball Hall of Fame
- Johnathan Ivy, ABA basketball player for the Buffalo eXtreme
- Mark Jones, NBA basketball player for the New Jersey Nets
- Tony Jordan, NFL running back
- Sonja Livingston, Essayist and author of Ghostbread, an award-winning memoir of childhood poverty
- Art Long, NBA basketball player for the Sacramento Kings
- Seven McGee, professional football player
- Mitch Miller, American musician
- Manuel Rivera-Ortiz, documentary photographer
- Kenneth Rogoff, Professor of Public Policy and Professor of Economics at Harvard University (never graduated)
- Andrei Shleifer, Professor of Economics at Harvard University; John Bates Clark Medal winner
- Mark Shulman, American humorist and author of over 100 books for teens and children
- Morrie Silver, businessman and minor league baseball executive, member of the International League Hall of Fame
- Hanna Thompson, Silver Medal recipient at the 2008 Beijing Olympics, Women's Saber Team
- Cathy Turner, short track speed skater, winner of gold medals at the 1992 and 1994 Winter Olympics
- Roland Williams, American football player, played in Super Bowl XXXIV for the St. Louis Rams

== Old campus ==
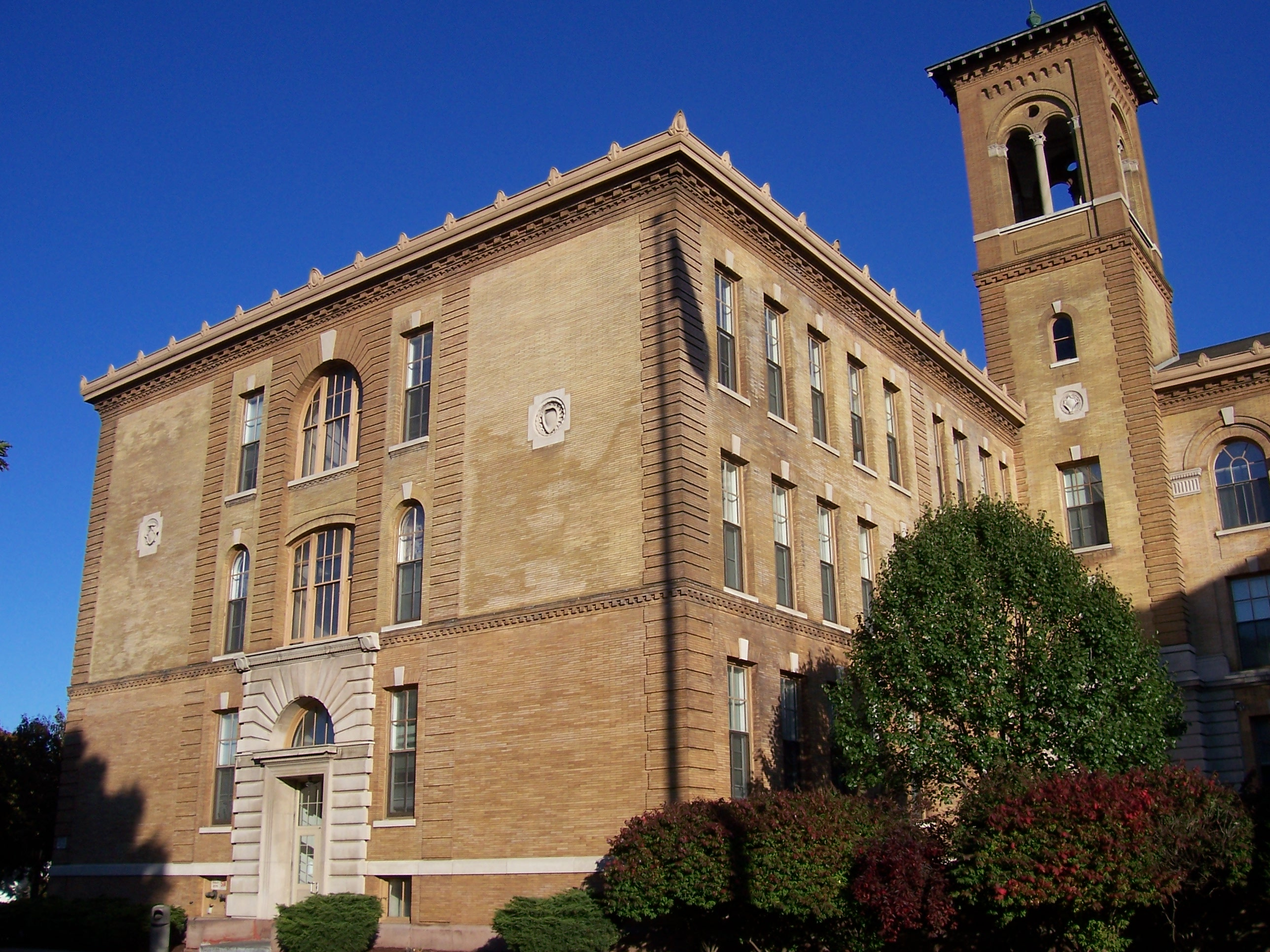
North wing

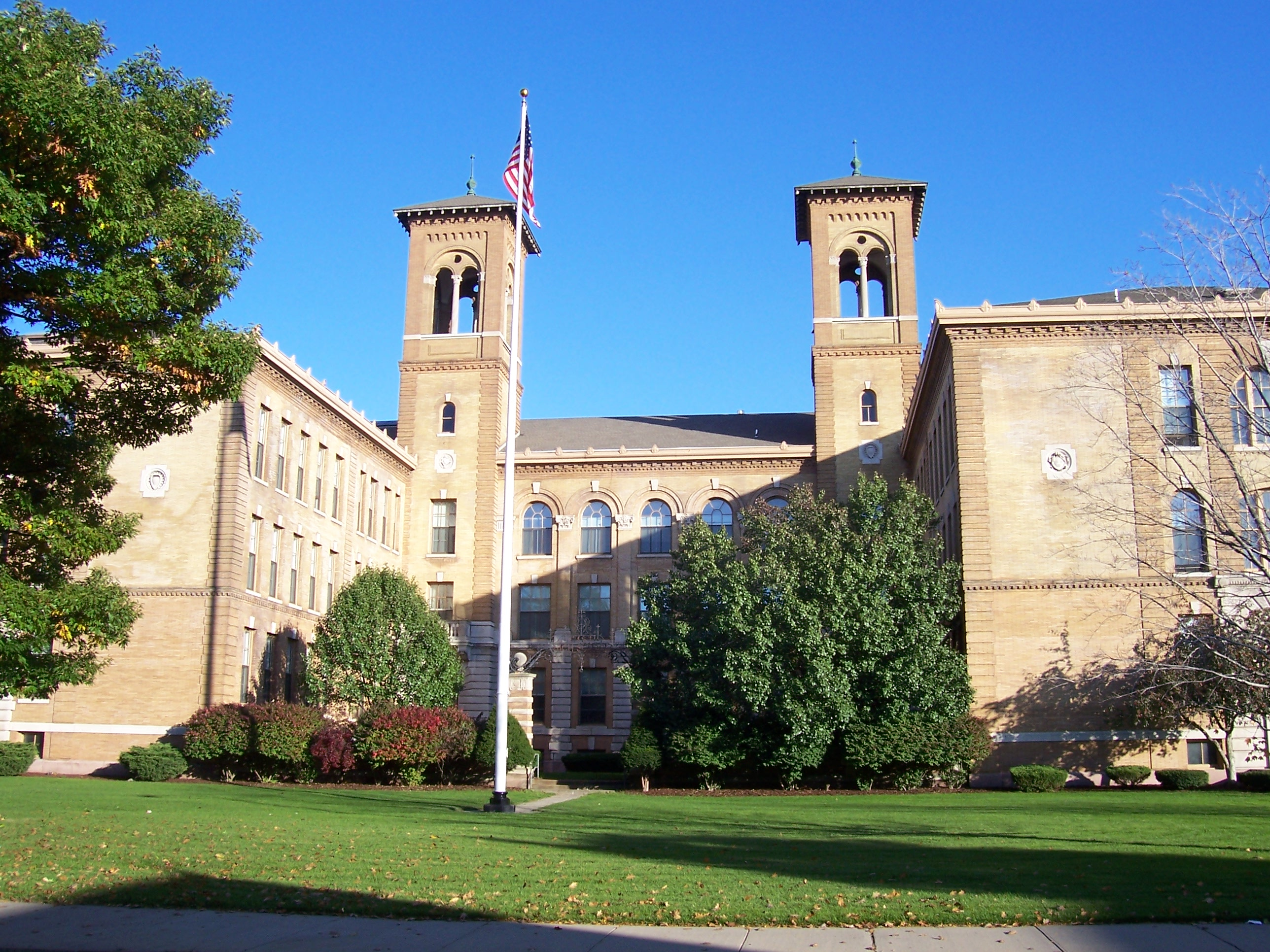
Front

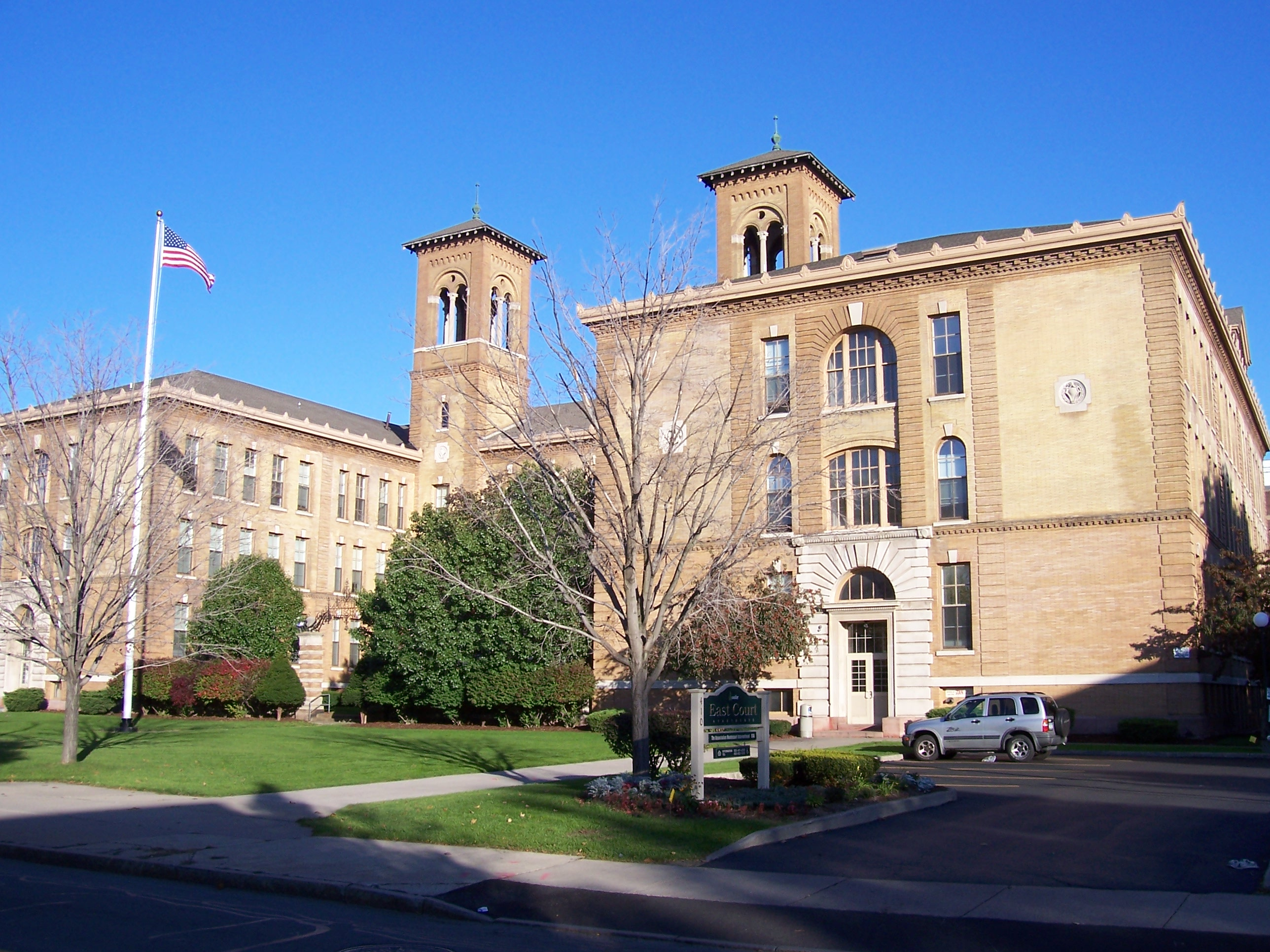
Oblique view

== New campus ==
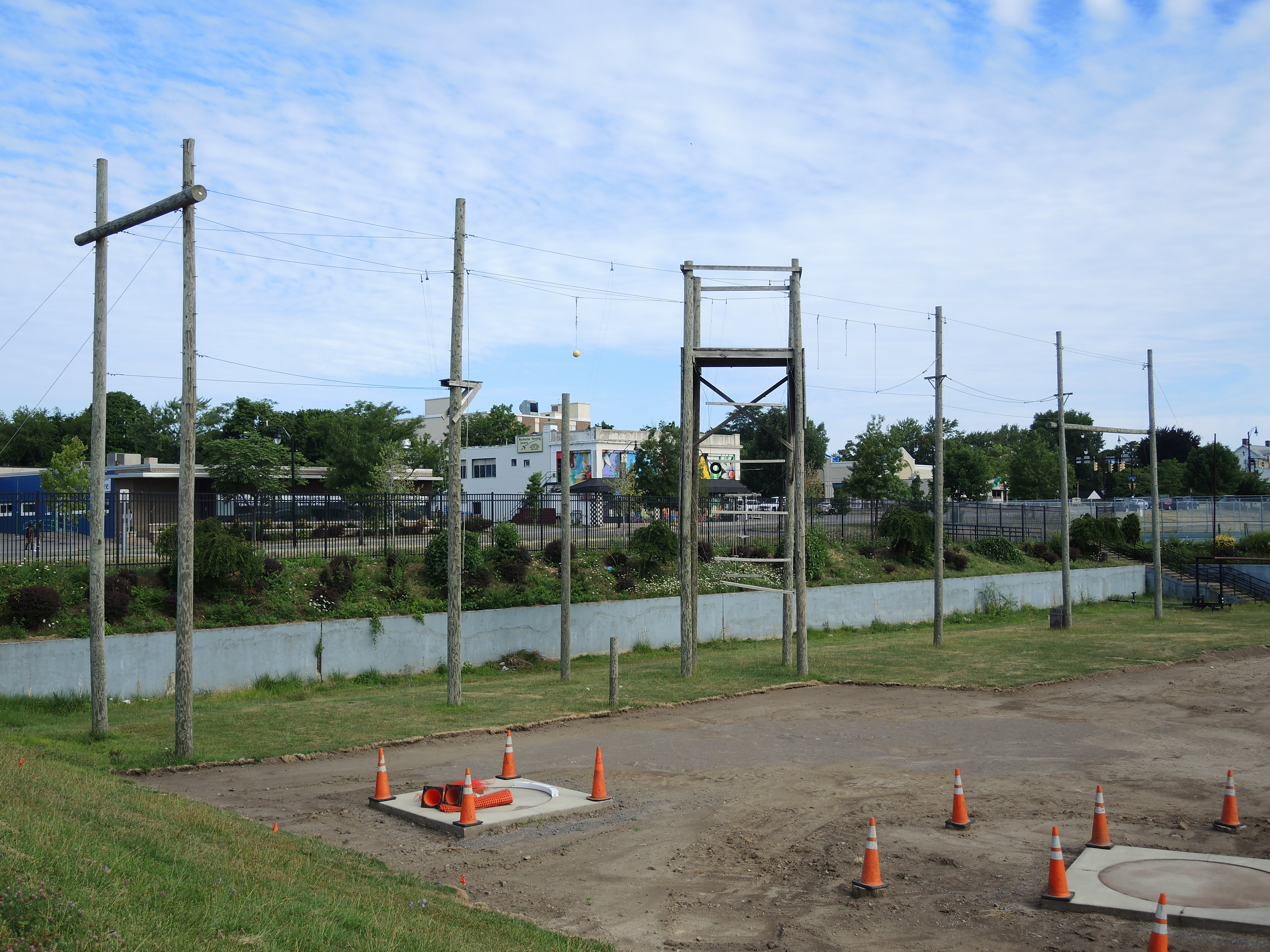
Climbing tower

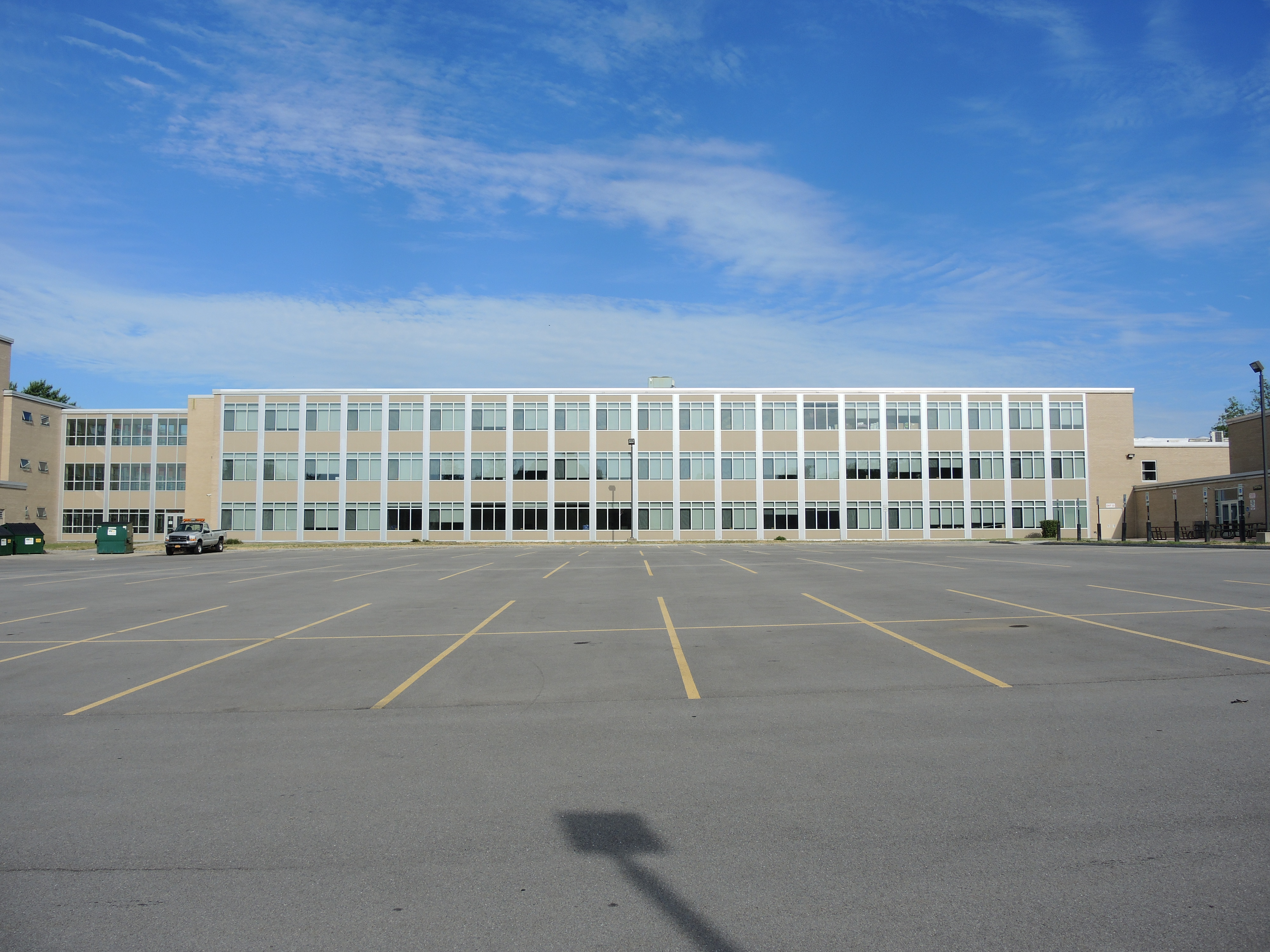
East wing

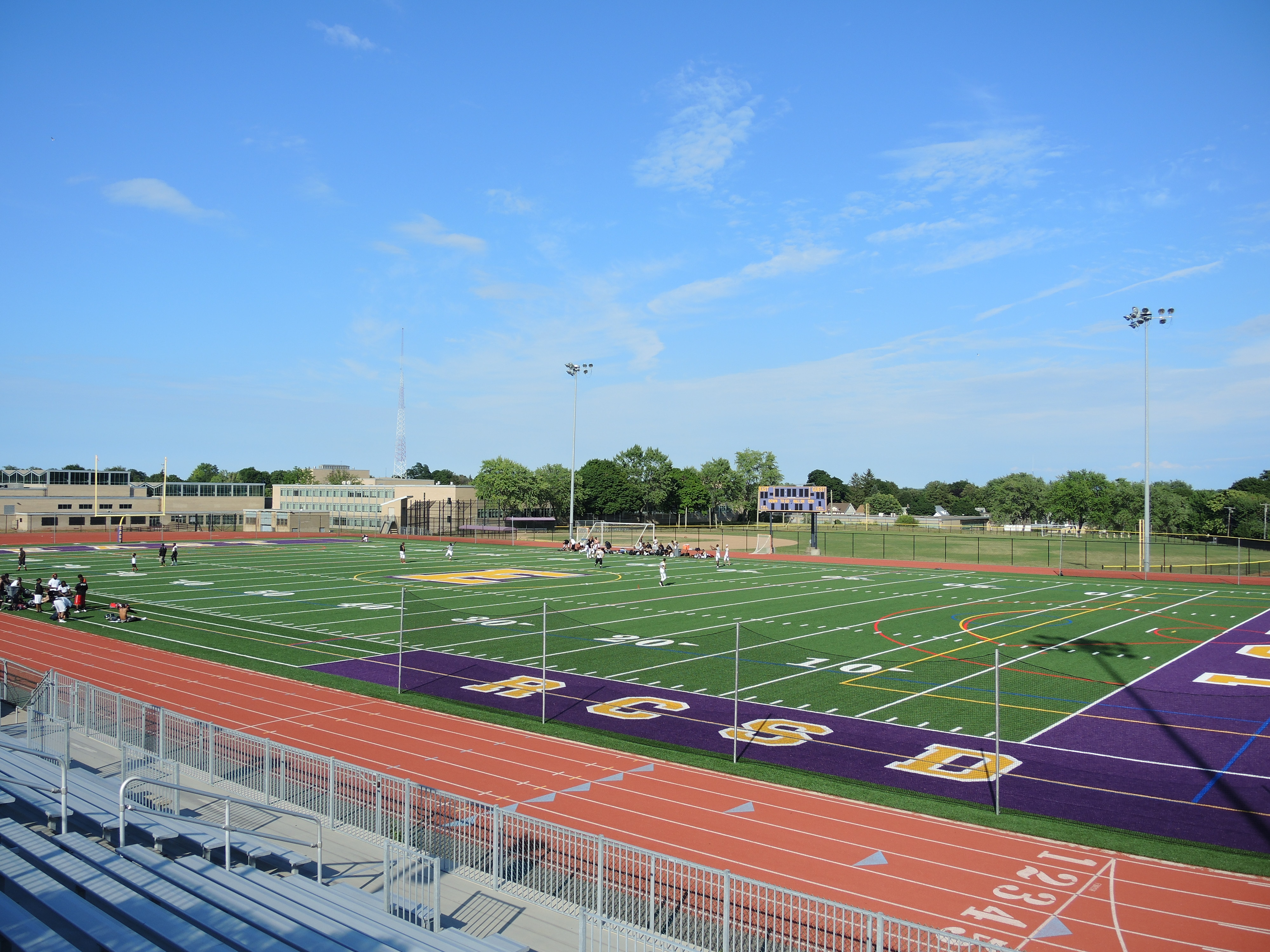
Football field

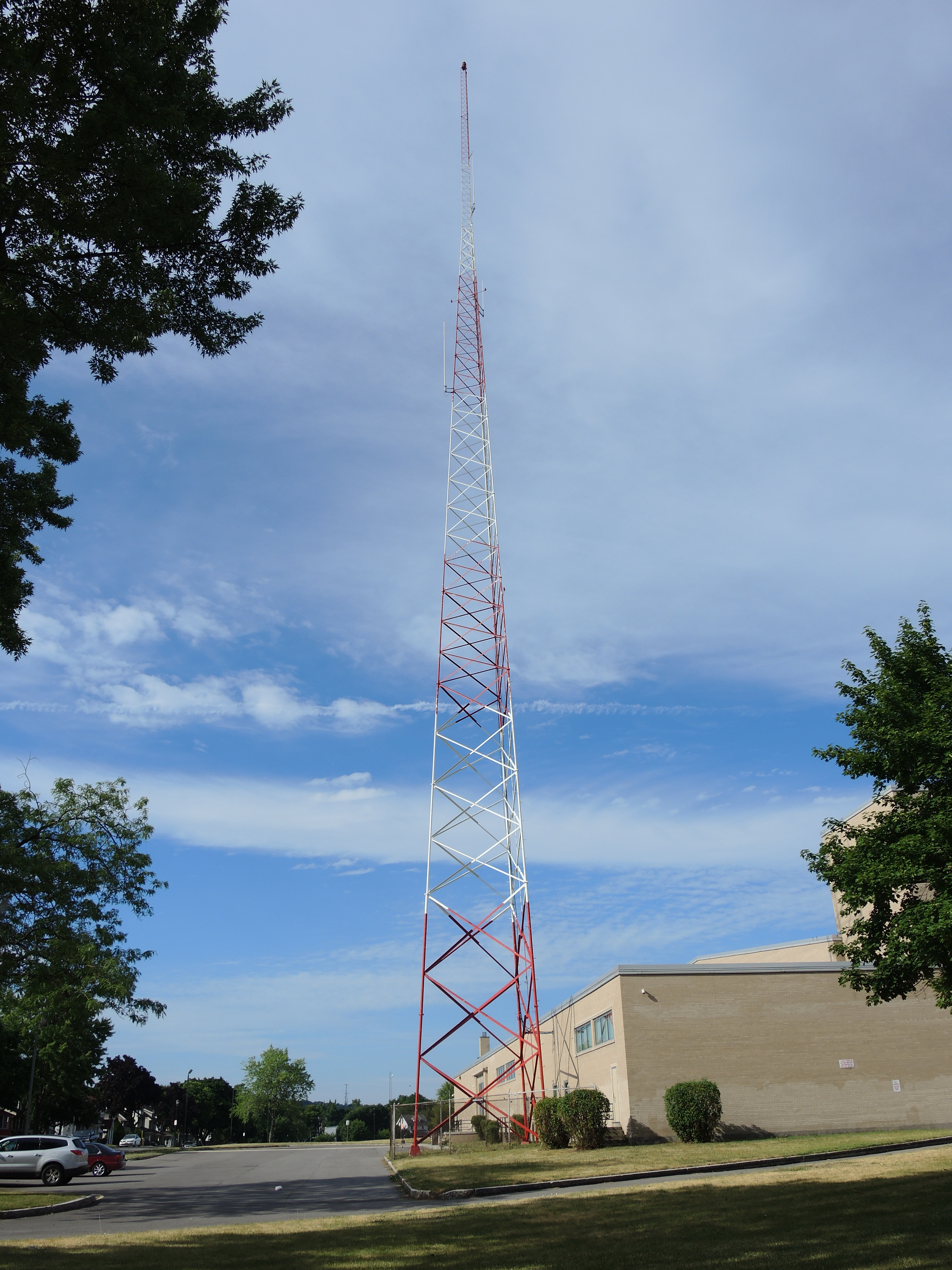
Radio tower

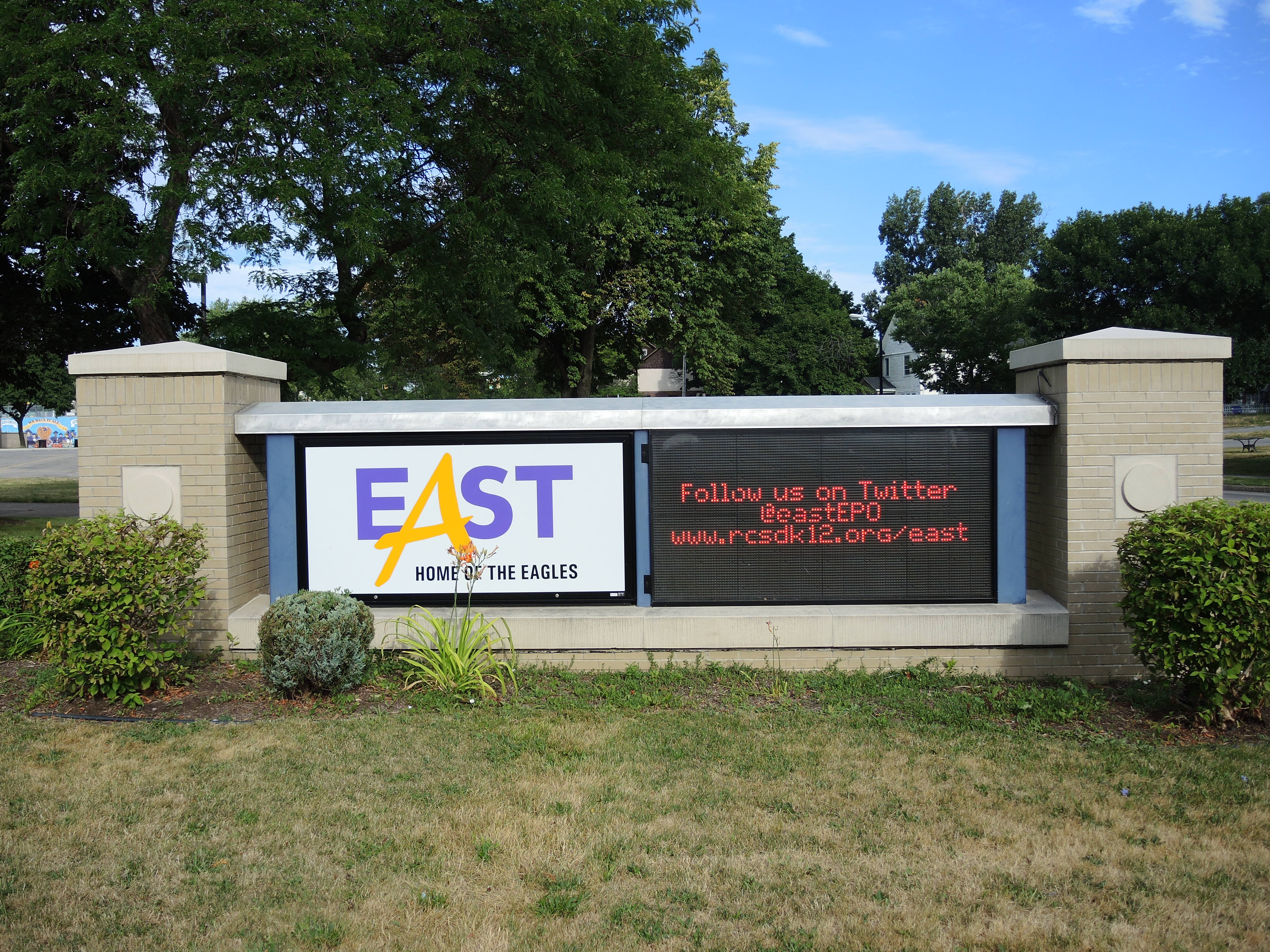
Electronic sign
