= Morrie Silver =

American businessman (1909–1974)

Morrie E. Silver
- Born: July 28, 1909
- Died: April 26, 1974 (aged 64); Miami, Florida
- Education: East High School (Rochester, New York)
- Occupation: Businessman
- Known for: Founder of the Rochester Red Wings

Morrie E. Silver (July 28, 1909–April 26, 1974) was an American businessman based in Rochester, New York. He is best known for his work with the Rochester Red Wings minor league baseball team.

== Business career ==
A native of Rochester, Silver attended East High School and was set to attend Cornell University, but had to change plans when his father became ill. He sold newspapers for the Rochester Times-Union, advancing to the circulation department.

In 1937, Silver founded a school, the Columbia Institute for Music. He later opened a music store, the Columbia Music Store, located at 77 Clinton Avenue South, which was very successful during the post-war recorded music boom. The store, at one time, became the highest-grossing record store in the United States, and a young singer named Lu Ann Simms was hired as a saleswoman in the early 1950s. He sold the store and started the appliance distributorship M. E. Silver Corporation.

== Rochester Red Wings ==
In 1956, the St. Louis Cardinals announced that they would no longer field a farm team in Rochester, where the minor league team, the Red Wings, was one of the oldest in baseball. A group spearheaded by Silver quickly attempted to raise funds to keep the team in Rochester. The resulting stock drive, which gathered 8,222 stockholders, was nicknamed "The 72-Day Miracle." In 1957, Rochester Community Baseball, Inc., with Silver the majority stockholder, purchased the Red Wings from the Cardinals, with Silver presenting the MLB team with a $500,000 check.

Silver said, "I just couldn't imagine youngsters growing up in years to come not being able to see professional baseball in Rochester."

Silver periodically worked in the front office of the Red Wings, serving as president in 1957, 1962, 1963, and 1965, and as general manager from 1966 to 1968.

== Death and legacy ==
Silver moved to Miami Beach in 1968, but continued to be involved in the operation of the Red Wings. Silver died of complications of a heart attack in Miami, Florida on April 26, 1974. He was survived by his wife, Anna, and a daughter, Naomi. Naomi Silver remains as president and chief executive of the Red Wings.

Red Wing Stadium, the home of the Red Wings, was renamed Silver Stadium upon Silver's retirement in 1968. The Red Wings played at Silver Stadium until 1996, after which the address of the Red Wings' new park, Frontier Field, was named One Morrie Silver Way. A statue near Frontier Field (now known as ESL Ballpark) was dedicated to Silver in 2007. The Morrie Silver Family Scholarship awards $5000 annually to young Red Wings employees who are attending school.

Silver was elected to the Rochester Red Wings Hall of Fame in 1989, and to the International League Hall of Fame in 2008. The Red Wings retired the fanciful jersey number 8222 in his honor, using the number of initial Red Wings shareholders from 1956.
