= Seven McGee =

American gridiron football player (born 2003)

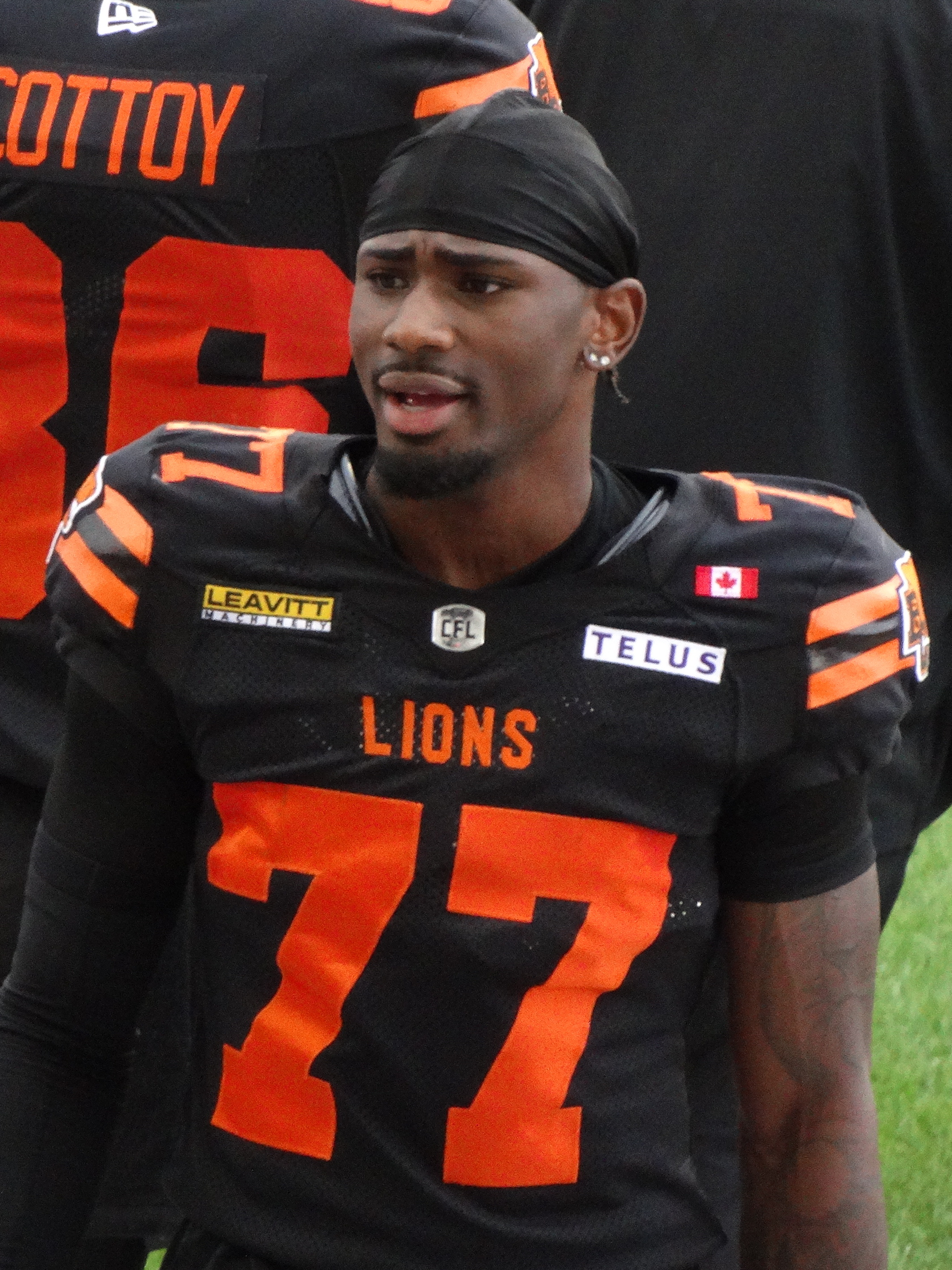
- McGee with the BC Lions in 2025

No. 8 – BC Lions
- Positions: Wide receiver, return specialist
- Roster status: Active
- CFL status: American

Personal information
- Born: March 13, 2002 (age 24)
- Listed height: 5 ft 9 in (1.75 m)
- Listed weight: 185 lb (84 kg)

Career information
- High school: East (Rochester, New York)
- College: Oregon (2021–2022); Jackson State (2023); Albany (2024)
- NFL draft: 2025: undrafted

Career history
- BC Lions (2025–present)

Career CFL statistics as of 2026
- Kickoff return yards: 1,292
- Punt return yards: 535
- Total return touchdowns: 1
- Stats at CFL.ca

Seven McGee (born March 13, 2002) is an American professional football player who is a wide receiver and return specialist for the BC Lions of the Canadian Football League (CFL). He played college football at Oregon, Jackson State, and Albany.

== Early life ==
Seven McGee was born on March 13, 2002. He was named Seven because he was the youngest of seven children in his family. He grew up in Rochester, New York. McGee played his freshman year at Grace Brethren High School in Simi Valley, California, in 2017 as a running back and defensive back. He rushed 158 times for 1,151 yards and 12 touchdowns on offense while posting 29 solo tackles, 13 assisted tackles, and one pass breakup on defense. Grace Brethren finished with an overall record of 13–3 and advanced to the CIF 2-A State Bowl finals.

In 2018, McGee transferred to East High School in Rochester, New York. He totaled 1,000 all-purpose yards, 10 touchdowns, 100 tackles, and two interceptions during the 2018 season. He earned second-team offense honors as an all-purpose player on MaxPreps' 2018 Sophomore All-American Team. In January 2019, McGee announced that he was transferring to Narbonne High School in Harbor City, Los Angeles. However, in May 2019, he transferred back to East High. His quick transfers violated New York State Public High School Athletic Association rules, so he was ruled ineligible for the 2019 season. The superintendent of East High stated that McGee left Narbonne High after finding the environment unsafe, and shortly after, the LA school district investigated misconduct at the school, resulting in the reassignment of the football coach, principal, assistant principal, and athletic director. In regards to the ruling, rapper Big Boi tweeted "Wack & Unfair as hell". The 2020 season was postponed due to the COVID-19 pandemic. In the class of 2021, McGee was rated a four-star recruit by ESPN.com, Rivals.com, and 247Sports. He was a consensus top-10 position player, receiving the following rankings: Rivals (No. 3 athlete), 247 composite (No. 3 all-purpose back), 247Sports (No. 6 all-purpose back), and ESPN (No. 8 running back). In December 2020, McGee signed a national letter of intent to play college football for the Oregon Ducks of the University of Oregon. He said that he would not be playing any high school football in March 2021, instead choosing to focus on college. He was also a letterman in basketball and volleyball in high school.

== College career ==
McGee first played college football for the Oregon Ducks of the University of Oregon as a running back. He played in 13 of 14 games as a true freshman in 2021. He began the season at running back but switched to wide receiver. Overall in 2021, he totaled 14 carries for 61 yards and one touchdown, seven receptions for 84 yards, five kick returns for 83 yards, and two punt returns for 19 yards. McGee appeared in the first seven games of the 2022 season before deciding to enter the transfer portal. He finished the season recording 11 catches for 67 yards, three rushes for -11 yards, and six kick returns for 99 yards.

McGee transferred to play for the Jackson State Tigers of Jackson State University in 2023. He played in nine games during the 2023 season, catching 19 receptions for 136 yards and four touchdowns.

McGee transferred again in 2024, this time to the University at Albany. He played in ten games for the Albany Great Danes as a senior in 2024, catching 47 catches for 644 yards and six touchdowns. He earned honorable mention All-Coastal Athletic Association honors for his performance during the 2024 season.

== Professional career ==
Pre-draft measurables
| Height | Weight |
|---|---|
| 5 ft 8 5/8 in (1.74 m) | 185 lb (84 kg) |
Values from Pro Day

After going undrafted in the 2025 NFL draft, McGee attended rookie minicamp on a tryout basis with the Atlanta Falcons. He signed with the BC Lions of the Canadian Football League on May 10, 2025. He was moved to the practice roster on June 1, before the start of the 2025 CFL season. McGee was promoted to the active roster on June 20, placed on the one-game injured list on June 27, and activated from the injured list on July 12, 2025. He dressed in 14 games overall for the Lions during the 2025 season, returning 48 kickoffs for 1,198 yards and 53 punts for 516 yards and one touchdown. He also posted two tackles and one forced fumble on special teams.

On June 17, 2026, McGee was placed on the Lions' 6-game injured list. He rejoined the active roster on October 22, 2026. On October 30, 2026, McGee was placed on the Lions' 1-game injured list ahead of the Western Semi-Final and he remained there to end the 2026 CFL season.
