= National Company Building =

Historic commercial building in New York, United States

- U.S. National Register of Historic Places
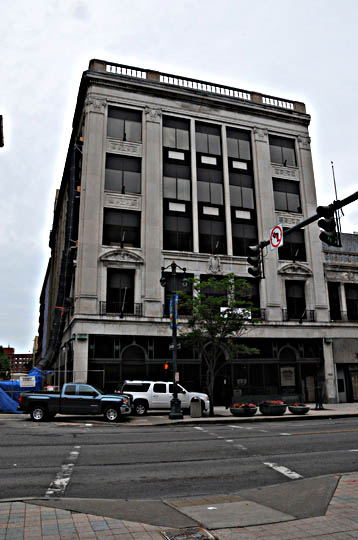
- National Company Building, January 2008

- Location within New York Location within the United States
- Location: 159 E. Main St., Rochester, New York
- Coordinates: 43°9′23″N 77°36′29″W
- Area: less than one acre
- Built: 1924
- Architect: Warner, J. Foster; The National Company
- Architectural style: Classical Revival
- MPS: Department Store TR
- NRHP reference No.: 84000291
- Added to NRHP: October 11, 1984

National Company Building is a historic department store building located at Rochester in Monroe County, New York. It was designed by J. Foster Warner in 1924 and is a five-story structure in the Classical Revival style. The Beaux-Arts decorated building is characterized by precise carved detailing.

It was listed on the National Register of Historic Places in 1984.
