= Rufus Sibley =

American businessman (1841–1928)

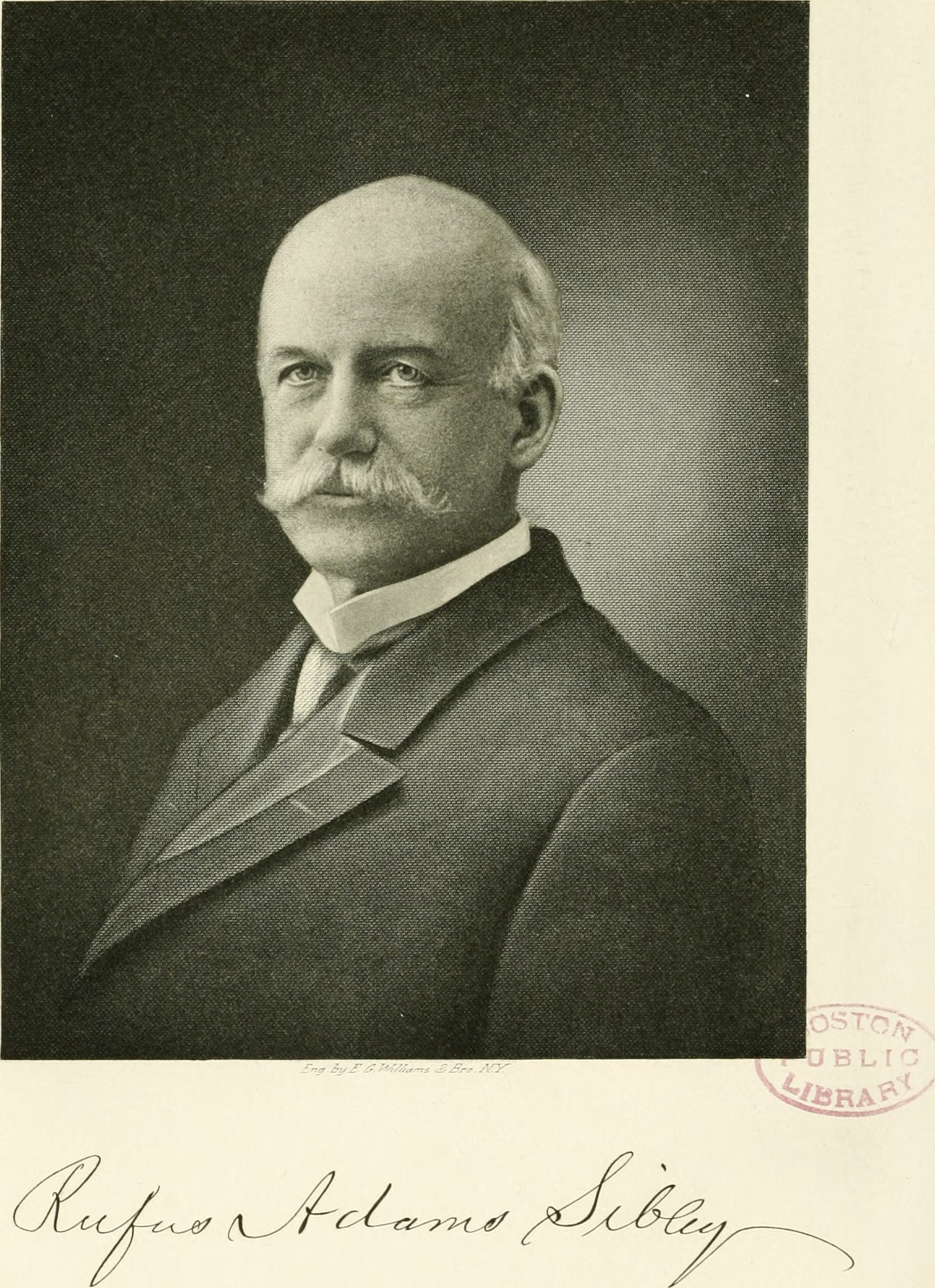

Rufus Adams Sibley (1841–1928) was an American businessman, best known as a founder of the Sibley, Lindsay & Curr Company department store in Rochester, New York.

== Biography ==
Sibley was born in Spencer, Massachusetts on December 3, 1841. After completing his education at the public schools in Spencer he taught school for two years, beginning at the age of sixteen. Following this he began working in a grocery store as a salesman and bookkeeper. At age 22 he took a job as bookkeeper and cashier at a Boston drygoods store. While working there he met Alexander Lindsay and John Curr who were to become his partners. The three formed a partnership called Sibley, Lindsay & Curr and opened a small store in Rochester called "The Boston Store" (no relation to the chain of the same name owned by The Bon-Ton). This was later renamed "Sibley, Lindsay & Curr Company." Rufus Sibley was president of the company from 1868 until his retirement in 1924. He died in Rochester on May 12, 1928, and is buried there in Mount Hope Cemetery.

On October 10, 1870, Sibley married Martha A. Haven of Charlton, Massachusetts; the couple had two children who died in infancy, and one son, Edward R. Sibley. Martha died on November 18, 1883. On November 21, 1885, Sibley married Elizabeth Conkey of Rochester; the couple had two children: John R. Sibley and Elizabeth Sibley. Mrs. Elizabeth Sibley died on August 26, 1918.

In addition to his business interests Rufus Sibley was involved in a number of social and charitable interests. He was an avid breeder of Jersey Cattle, which he raised at his "Moose Hill Farm" in Spencer, Massachusetts. He was president of the American Jersey Cattle Club. He was active in the Episcopal Church, and was deputy six times at the Church's General Convention. He was a member of the Genesee Valley Club, the Country Club of Rochester, and the Rochester Art Club.

He served on the Executive Committee and was treasurer and president of the Board of Trustees of the University of Rochester. He was an honorary trustee of Hahnemann Hospital in Rochester, which later became the Genesee Hospital, and of the Rochester School for the Deaf. He was chairman of the board of the Rochester City Hospital (later Rochester General Hospital). He was vice-president of the Reynolds Library and served as president of the Rochester Chamber of Commerce.
