= Our Lady of Mercy School for Young Women =

Private all-female school in Rochester, New York, United States

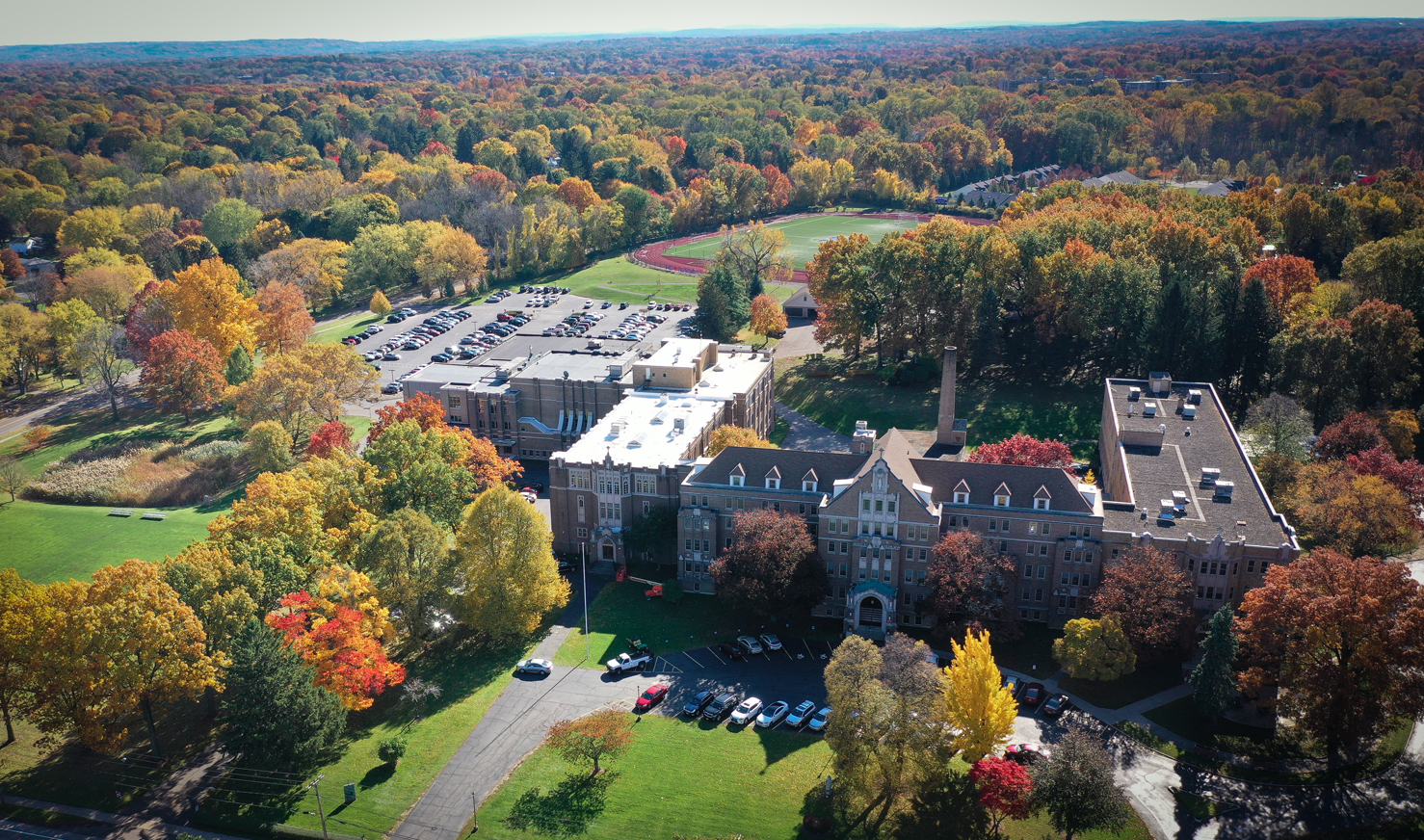
- Exterior of Our Lady of Mercy School for Young Women in 2019

Location
- 1437 Blossom Road; Rochester, (Monroe County), New York 14610; United States; 43°8′54″N 77°32′16″W

Information
- Type: Private, all-female
- Motto: Via, Veritas et Vita ("The Way, The Truth and The Life")
- Religious affiliations: Roman Catholic; Sisters of Mercy
- Established: 1928; 98 years ago
- Grades: 6–12
- Campus: Suburban
- Colors: Navy blue and white
- Slogan: Life Changing.
- Mascot: Monarch (Lion)
- Nickname: Mercy
- Accreditation: Middle States Association of Colleges and Schools
- Publication: Mercedes (literary magazine)
- Newspaper: The Quill
- Yearbook: Veritas
- Tuition: 2021–2022: $9,420 (grade 6) $12,125 (grades 7–8) $13,120 (grades 9–11) $13,450 (grade 12)
- Alumni: Over 13,000
- Website: http://www.mercyhs.com

Our Lady of Mercy School for Young Women is a private all-girls Catholic school teaching grades 6–12, located in Brighton, Monroe County, New York, United States, near Rochester. It is located within the Roman Catholic Diocese of Rochester.

The American Sisters of Mercy founded Our Lady of Mercy High School in Rochester in 1928, based in the tradition of the Roman Catholic sisterhood begun by Catherine McAuley, founder of the Sisters of Mercy. The building was built in 1928, and designed by noted Rochester architect J. Foster Warner (1859–1937). It educated young women in grades 9-12 for the first six decades of its operation, branching out to include grades 7 and 8 in 1990. In September 2012, Our Lady of Mercy High School expanded to include grade 6. To reflect this change, its name was changed to Our Lady of Mercy School for Young Women.

== Traditions ==
Mercy has been a part of the Rochester community for nearly 100 years. During that time, the school has developed many traditions, some dating to the earliest days of Mercy's establishment.

- Spirit Week - Each fall, classes participate in weeklong competitions that culminate on Spirit Day. On this day, students dress in their class colors and compete in relay races, pie-eating contests, class dances, and other festivities.
- Spirit Gala - Spirit Gala is the school's signature fundraising event attended each fall by hundreds of alumnae, donors, friends, and faculty. Over the years, the Gala has raised millions of dollars in support of the school's academic programs.
- Golden Mass - In December, homerooms “adopt” a local family in need and provide them with Christmas baskets containing gifts and food. Following a beautiful liturgy, during which the Christmas baskets displayed behind the altar are blessed, students and families deliver the items to the families.
- Mission Month - In March, students raise money for local, national, and international charities through school-wide fundraisers.
- Arts Fest - Typically held in the spring, Arts Fest gives students a chance to showcase their talents during a day of performances. Additional activities include a concert from a local professional group and hour-long workshops taught by teachers and other professionals.
- Father-Daughter Dinner Dance - In May, many girls and their fathers attend the Father-Daughter Dinner Dance. John C. Hayes P’98, ‘01, ‘06, ‘10, ‘12, ‘16, ‘19, holds the record for most Father-Daughter Dinner Dances attended.
- Junior Ring Ceremony - In May, juniors receive their class rings, inscribed with the school crest (a cross encircled by the Latin motto “Via, Veritas et Vita,” meaning the Way, the Truth, and the Life”) and a shank on both sides featuring a rising sun with the open Bible among the rays. Some people also choose to inscribe other things such as their initials and graduation year. The rings, blessed at the Mass, are a sign of their Mercy journey and the oneness they share with the thousands of alumnae who also wear it. Students traditionally “turn” each other's rings at the reception following the ceremony.
- May Day - In honor of Mary, the mother of Jesus, Mercy observes a traditional May Day celebration, which dates back to the beginnings of the school. A senior is elected May Queen and has a court of peer-elected juniors and seniors who help organize the ceremony. Following the Mass, the Blessed Mother's crowning takes place in the Grotto on the school grounds.
- Moving Up Day - The academic school year ends in June with Moving Up Day where classes gather in the Auditorium to provide advice to the classes below them. Following each presentation, classes “move up” rows and the seniors join hands and walk to the stage to sing the Alma Mater for the last time in the Auditorium.
- Rose Mass - The evening before commencement, Mercy seniors celebrate Rose Mass in the Motherhouse Chapel. Joined by faculty and staff, this beloved tradition is the last opportunity for seniors and their teachers to gather as a Mercy family to say goodbye. Each student carries a rose into Mass that is blessed and given back to them the next day at graduation.
- Retreats - Each grade participates in an annual class retreat. Freshman retreat is held in school, while sophomore and junior retreats are daylong events held off campus. Senior retreat is an overnight at Camp Stella Maris and is one of the last times the senior class gathers together.

== Extracurriculars ==
Mercy offers many extracurriculars, including nearly 50 clubs that have been invited to compete regionally, nationally, and internationally. Mercy is home to the Catherine McAuley chapter of the National Honor Society and offers many leadership opportunities through the Student Council and Campus Ministry Board. Youth and Government as well as Mock Trial give students real-life skills in practice settings. Robotics, Masterminds, and Math League test students' knowledge, while Veritas (yearbook), The Quill (newspaper), and Mercedes (literary magazine) give students a creative outlet. Students interested in health and fitness can join Ski Club, Run Club, or Boxing Club. Habitat for Humanity, Friends of Rachel, and the Mercy Service Program help students get involved with the community both in and outside of school. For the musically inclined, there's a choir, a show choir, and an orchestra as well as a fall musical, spring drama, and Children's Theatre production.

== Athletics ==
Varsity and junior varsity teams compete in sixteen sports: alpine skiing, basketball, bowling, cheerleading, crew, cross country, golf, indoor track, lacrosse, sailing, soccer, softball, swimming and diving, tennis, track and field, and volleyball. The teams have won numerous Section V championships in the areas of basketball, bowling, cross country, downhill skiing, soccer, softball, tennis, track and field, and volleyball.

== Notable alumnae ==
- Mimi Kennedy, actress.
- Lu Ann Simms (née Lucille Ann Ciminelli), singer.
- Elizabeth Streb, choreographer, winner of MacArthur Foundation Genius Award.
- Abby Wambach, two-time Olympic gold medalist in soccer; 2015 FIFA Women's World Cup Winner.
