= Sibley's =

Department store chain with stores only in New York

Sibley Lindsay Curr & Co.
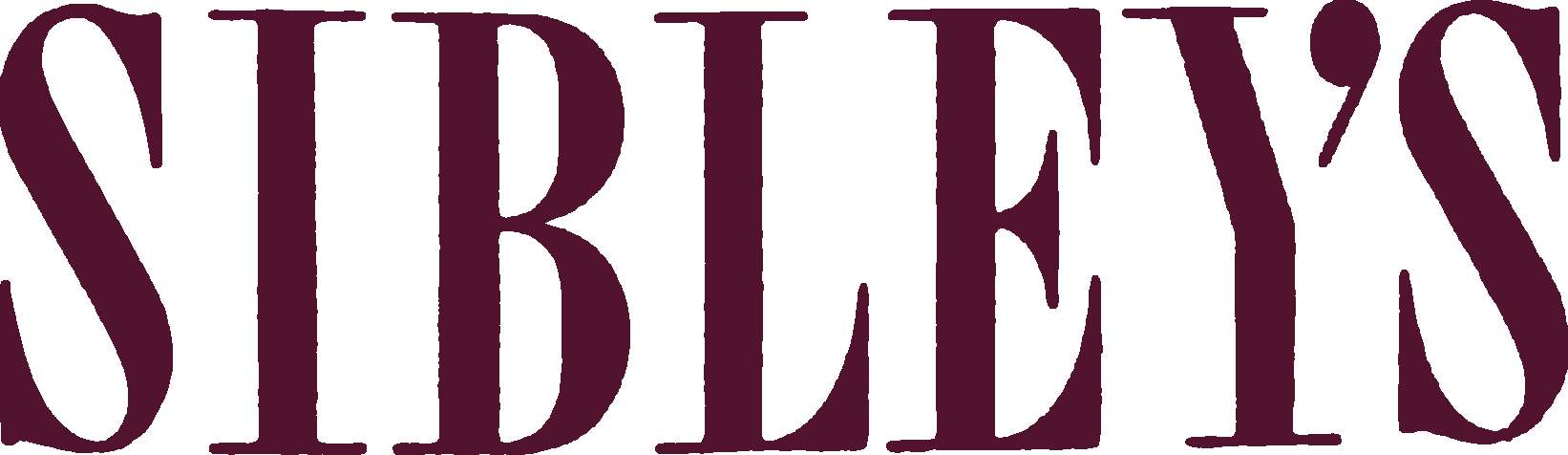

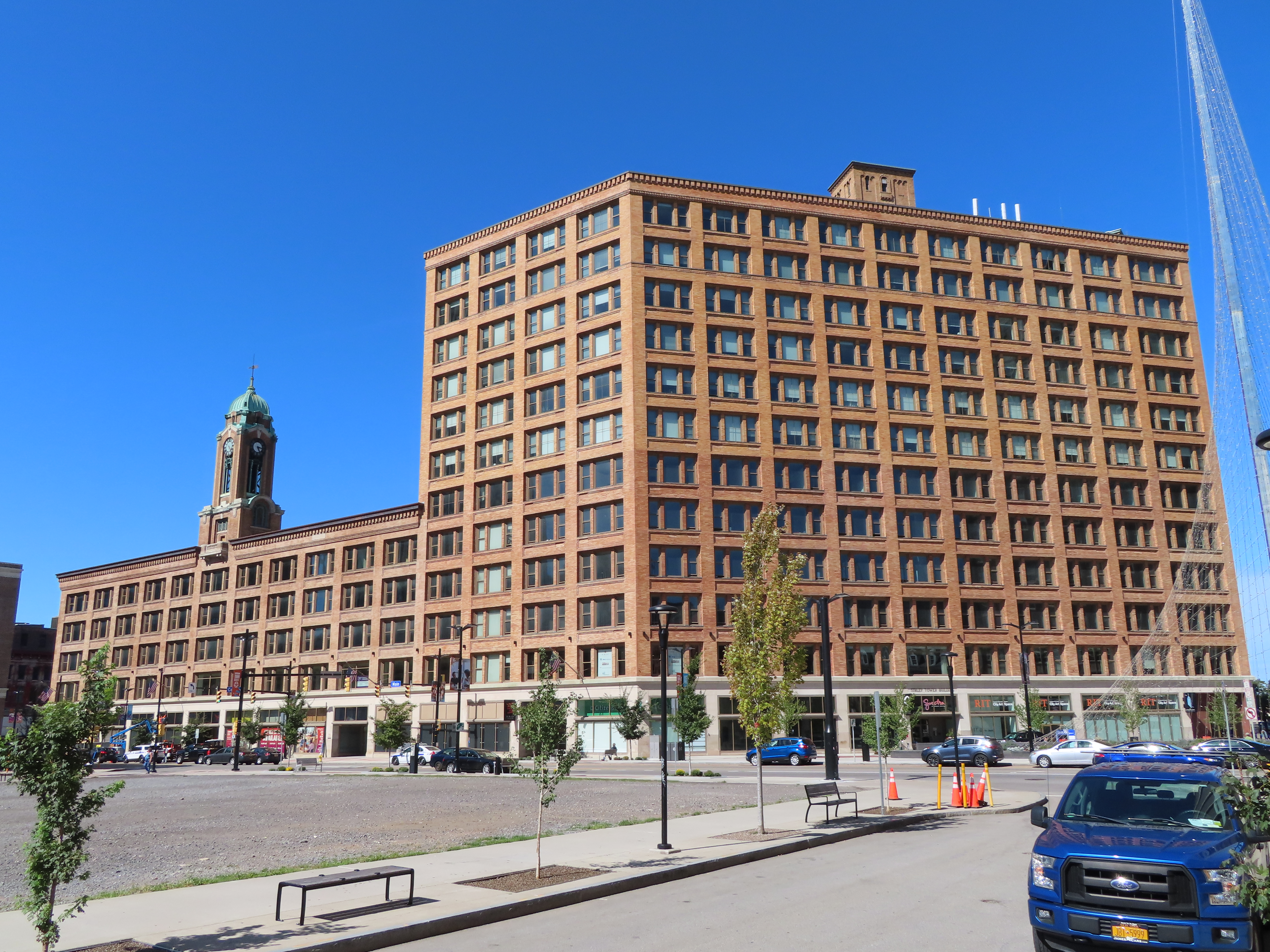
- Exterior of the former Sibley’s Flagship store in Rochester, New York (2019)
- Company type: Subsidiary
- Industry: Retail
- Founded: 1868; 158 years ago
- Founder: Rufus Sibley; Alexander Lindsay; John Curr
- Defunct: 1990; 36 years ago
- Fate: Converted into Kaufmann's
- Successor: Kaufmann's (1990–2006); Macy's (2006–present)
- Headquarters: Rochester, New York, United States
- Products: Clothing, footwear, bedding, jewelry, beauty products, and housewares
- Parent: Associated Dry Goods (1957-1986); The May Department Stores Company (1986-1990)
- Website: None

Sibley Lindsay Curr & Co., known informally as Sibley's, was a Rochester, New York–based department store chain with stores located exclusively in the state of New York. Its flagship store, at 228 East Main Street in downtown Rochester, also housed its headquarters and featured an elegant executive dining room on the top floor.

== History ==
=== The Department Store Years ===
Rufus Sibley, Alexander Lindsay, and John Curr were employees at the Hogg, Brown & Taylor dry-goods store in Boston. Wishing to go into business for themselves, they investigated potential sites and settled on the growing city of Rochester. Their first storefront, often called "the Boston store" by locals, opened in 1868. When the company opened a new 12-story, 23-acre (9 ha) flagship store in the Granite Building, it was among the five largest department stores in the country at the time.

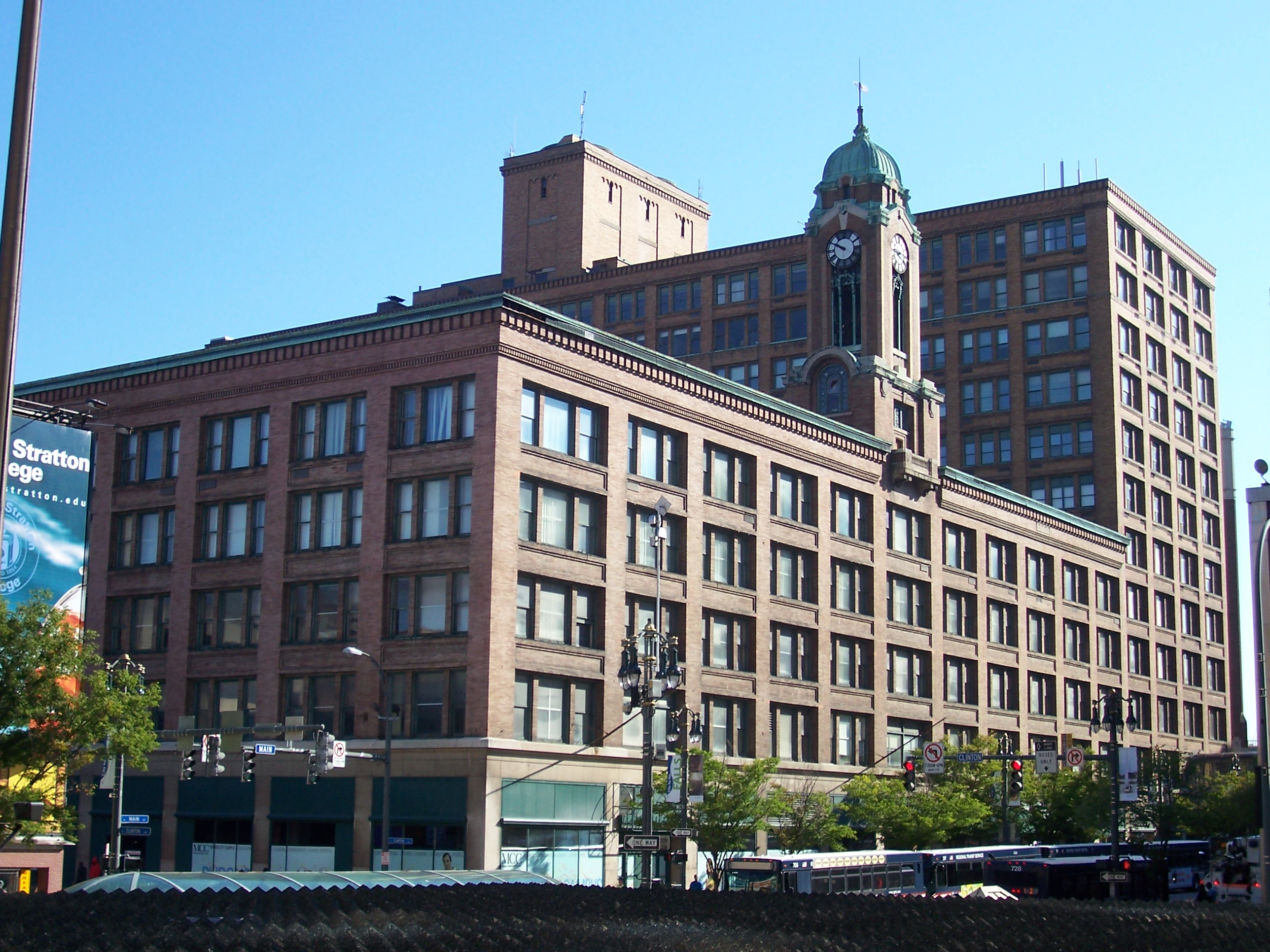
The Sibley Building

In 1905, after the disastrous 1904 "Sibley fire" gutted the Granite Building and much of Rochester's dry goods district, Sibley's moved to its final location, the Sibley Building at the northeast corner of East Main Street and Clinton Avenue. By 1939, Sibley's was the largest department store between New York City and Chicago.

With the postwar growth of the suburbs, Sibley's expanded outside the city in 1955 with its first branch location at Eastway Plaza in Penfield. The chain would eventually grow to 15 locations throughout the Rochester and Buffalo region. The company was acquired by the Associated Dry Goods Corporation in 1957.

In 1962, competitors B. Forman Co. and McCurdy's collaborated to construct Midtown Plaza, right across Main Street from Sibley's. Sibley's was connected to the new mall by an enclosed third-floor walkway, part of the Rochester Skyway system. In 1969, Sibley's opened a location at 400 S. Salina Street in downtown Syracuse.

The 1980s saw the gradual downsizing of Sibley's. In 1980, the entire fifth floor of the store was cleared out and leased to General Motors Rochester Products Division for use as offices. The in-store bakery closed in 1980, followed by the grocery store in 1981. The parent company of Sibley's was acquired by May Department Stores in 1986, and by 1988 only three floors of the building were open for shopping. Sibley's downtown Buffalo location closed in 1987, followed by the Syracuse location in 1989. Management attempted cost-cutting measures, which only served to drive away what few customers were left.

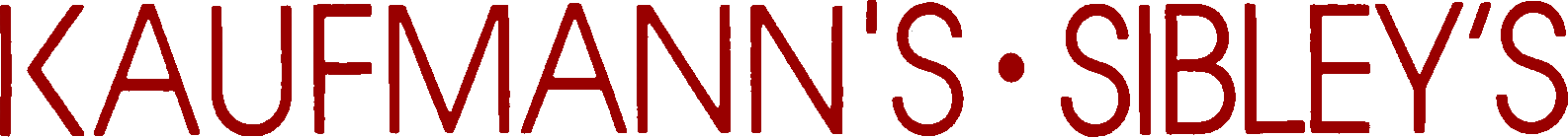
Kaufmann's-Sibley's transition logo

Sibley's downtown Rochester store closed on January 31, 1990, and its name was merged into May Company's Kaufmann's brand. Most of its suburban locations, after converting to Kaufmann's, became part of Macy's by 2006.

=== Monroe Community College – Damon City Campus calls Sibley Building Home ===
In 1991 the State University of New York's Monroe Community College, also known as MCC, opened its second campus at the Sibley Building. The downtown campus continued to operate here until the completion of a new downtown campus in 2017, which is now located at nearby Kodak Tower, the headquarters of the Kodak Company.

== Today – Sibley Square ==
Now under a new name, Sibley Square, the iconic Sibley Building is undergoing a major overhaul, transforming the historic site into a combination of retail, commercial (offices), and upscale residential units. The renovations seek to combine the historic treasure of this architectural space while also creating a sleek, modern atmosphere for today's standards.

=== Developer ===
The current Sibley Square project is being developed by WinnCompanies, a Boston, Massachusetts–based award-winning development firm. WinnCompanies was founded in 1971 by Arthur Winn.

=== Address Change ===
The current address of Sibley Square is:

250 East Main Street

Rochester, NY 14604

== See also ==
- List of department stores converted to Macy's
