= Al Butler =

American basketball player (1938–2000)

Personal information
- Born: July 9, 1938 Birmingham, Alabama, U.S.
- Died: July 12, 2000 (aged 62)
- Listed height: 6 ft 2 in (1.88 m)
- Listed weight: 175 lb (79 kg)

Career information
- High school: East (Rochester, New York)
- College: Niagara (1958–1961)
- NBA draft: 1961: 2nd round, 17th overall pick
- Drafted by: Boston Celtics
- Playing career: 1961–1970
- Position: Point guard
- Number: 22, 3, 20

Career history
- 1961: Boston Celtics
- 1961–1964: New York Knicks
- 1964–1965: Baltimore Bullets
- 1965–1966: Trenton Colonials
- 1966–1967: Harrisburg Patriots
- 1967–1970: Wilkes-Barre Barons

Career highlights
- EPBL champion (1969); All-EPBL Second Team (1966); No. 4 retired by Niagara Purple Eagles; First-team Parade All-American (1957)

Career NBA statistics
- Points: 2,282 (9.8 ppg)
- Rebounds: 696 (3.0 rpg)
- Assists: 530 (2.3 apg)
- Stats at NBA.com
- Stats at Basketball Reference

Elbert J. "Al" Butler (July 9, 1938 – July 12, 2000) was an American basketball player who played four seasons in the National Basketball Association (NBA).

Born in Birmingham, Alabama, he played basketball for East High School in Rochester, New York, before playing collegiately for Niagara University. He was named to the 1961 National Invitation Tournament All-Star team by the Associated Press, despite Niagara losing its only game, 68–71 against Providence.

He was selected by the Boston Celtics in the second round (17th pick overall) of the 1961 NBA draft. He played for the Celtics (1961), New York Knicks (1962–64) and Baltimore Bullets (1964–65) in the NBA for a total of 234 games. He started for the Knicks for Wilt Chamberlain's 100-point game, scoring 8 points.

Butler was the last player to ever wear the number 22 for the Celtics, as they would retire it in honor of Ed Macauley in 1963.

Butler played in the Eastern Professional Basketball League (EPBL) for the Trenton Colonials, Harrisburg Patriots and Wilkes-Barre Barons from 1964 to 1970. He won an EPBL championship with the Barons in 1969. Butler was selected to the All-EPBL Second Team in 1966.

Butler died of cancer on July 12, 2000. After his death, a scholarship was established in his name at Monroe Community College, where he had worked as a guidance counselor.

== Career statistics ==
Legend
GP	Games played	GS	Games started	MPG	Minutes per game
FG%	Field goal percentage	3P%	3-point field goal percentage	FT%	Free throw percentage
RPG	Rebounds per game	APG	Assists per game	SPG	Steals per game
BPG	Blocks per game	PPG	Points per game	**Bold**	Career high

=== NBA ===
==== Regular season ====
Year	Team	GP	MPG	FG%	FT%	RPG	APG	PPG
1961–62	Boston	5	9.4	.448	**.833**	2.6	.8	6.2
1961–62	New York	54	**36.5**	**.463**	.705	**6.0**	**3.7**	**14.7**
1962–63	New York	74	20.1	.439	.770	2.3	2.1	10.0
1963–64	New York	**76**	18.1	.422	.738	2.2	2.1	8.7
1964–65	Baltimore	25	6.9	.329	.733	.8	.5	2.4
Career		234	21.6	.439	.739	3.0	2.3	9.8
