= Sibley fire =

1904 conflagration in Rochester, New York

Coordinates: 43.160429°N 77.571096°W

The Sibley fire was a 1904 fire in Rochester, New York.

The worst conflagration in the city's history at the time, the fire broke out shortly before 5 o'clock on February 26, 1904, in the basement of the Rochester Dry Goods company's store at 156 Main street. Hampered by bitter cold, the fire burned for 40 hours, engulfing the north side of East Main Street, spanning from St. Paul Street to just short of Clinton Avenue. When finally put out, the fire had leveled between 1.5 and 1.75 acres (0.61 and 0.71 ha) and caused significant damage to the Sibley's department store (hence becoming popularly known as the "Sibley fire"). The estimated loss was about $3,000,000 (equivalent to $107,000,000 in 2025 when adjusted for inflation).

The fire was reported to have been started by an uninsulated overloaded electrical fuse at the Rochester Dry Goods Company.
